= 1991 Puerto Rico Open – Singles =

Singles
- 1991 Puerto Rico Open

Final
- Champion: (France) Julie Halard
- Runner-up: (South Africa) Amanda Coetzer
- Score: 7–5, 7–5

Details
- Draw: 32 (4Q/1LL)
- Seeds: 8

Events
Singles	Doubles
← 1990 ·	Puerto Rico Open	· 1992 →

Jennifer Capriati was the defending champion, but did not compete this year.

Julie Halard won the title by defeating Amanda Coetzer 7–5, 7–5 in the final.

== Seeds ==
1. (United States) Gigi Fernández (quarterfinals)
2. (France) Julie Halard (champion)
3. (Belgium) Sabine Appelmans (semifinals)
4. (France) Mary Pierce (semifinals)
5. (Germany) Barbara Rittner (quarterfinals)
6. (United States) Susan Sloane-Lundy (quarterfinals)
7. (Argentina) Florencia Labat (second round)
8. (Italy) ~~Federica Bonsignori~~ (withdrew)

== Draw ==
=== Key ===
- Q = Qualifier
- WC = Wild card
- LL = Lucky loser
- Alt = Alternate
- SE = Special exempt
- PR = Protected ranking
- ITF = ITF entry
- JE = Junior exempt
- w/o = Walkover
- r = Retired
- d = Defaulted
- SR = Special ranking

=== Finals ===
Semifinals
(South Africa) Amanda Coetzer	3	6	7
3	(Belgium) Sabine Appelmans	6	3	5
4	(France) Mary Pierce	5	1
2	(France) Julie Halard	7	6

Final
(South Africa) Amanda Coetzer	5	5
2	(France) Julie Halard	7	7

=== Top half ===
First round
1	(United States) G Fernández	6	4	6
(Austria) P Ritter	1	6	4
Q	(United States) C Benjamin	6	6
Q	(United States) A Schwartz	4	4
(Puerto Rico) E Viqueira	1	0
(South Africa) A Coetzer	6	6
(Canada) R Alter	6	6
Q	(United States) J Watanabe	2	1
3	(Belgium) S Appelmans	7	6
(Japan) R Hiraki	5	2
(Brazil) L Corsato	3	6	5
(United States) D Faber	6	4	7
LL	(Canada) M Drake	6	2	6
(Poland) R Baranski	1	6	2
(Germany) V Martinek	0	1
6	(United States) S Sloane-Lundy	6	6

Second round
1	(United States) G Fernández	6	6
Q	(United States) C Benjamin	4	3
(South Africa) A Coetzer	6	6
(Canada) R Alter	2	2
3	(Belgium) S Appelmans	6	6
(United States) D Faber	4	1
LL	(Canada) M Drake	0	3
6	(United States) S Sloane-Lundy	6	6

Quarterfinals
1	(United States) G Fernández	4	2
(South Africa) A Coetzer	6	6
3	(Belgium) S Appelmans	6	6
6	(United States) S Sloane-Lundy	4	1

Semifinals
(South Africa) A Coetzer	3	6	7
3	(Belgium) S Appelmans	6	3	5

=== Bottom half ===
First round
7	(Argentina) F Labat	6	3	6
(United States) L Allen	1	6	4
(United States) A Leand	2	1
(United States) C Cunningham	6	6
(Finland) P Thorén	6^{1}	3
(United States) S Rehe	7^{7}	6
(United States) A Grossman	3	1
4	(France) M Pierce	6	6
5	(Germany) B Rittner	6	6
(Mexico) A Gavaldón	3	3
(United States) A Keller	6	6
(United States) S Stafford	3	3
(Sweden) M Strandlund	6	2	1
Q	(United States) C Kuhlman	3	6	6
(Germany) S Hack	3	4
2	(France) J Halard	6	6

Second round
7	(Argentina) F Labat	1	0
(United States) C Cunningham	6	6
(United States) S Rehe	3	6	5
4	(France) M Pierce	6	0	7
5	(Germany) B Rittner	6	7
(United States) A Keller	4	5
Q	(United States) C Kuhlman	4	4
2	(France) J Halard	6	6

Quarterfinals
(United States) C Cunningham	6	1	2
4	(France) M Pierce	3	6	6
5	(Germany) B Rittner	7	1	6^{4}
2	(France) J Halard	5	6	7^{7}

Semifinals
4	(France) M Pierce	5	1
2	(France) J Halard	7	6
