= 1991 Puerto Rico Open – Doubles =

Doubles
- 1991 Puerto Rico Open

Final
- Champions: (Japan) Rika Hiraki (Argentina) Florencia Labat
- Runners-up: (Belgium) Sabine Appelmans (United States) Camille Benjamin
- Score: 6–3, 6–3

Details
- Draw: 16 (1Q)
- Seeds: 4

Events
Singles	Doubles
- Puerto Rico Open

Elena Brioukhovets and Natalia Medvedeva were the defending champions, but they did not compete this year.

Rika Hiraki and Florencia Labat won the title by defeating Sabine Appelmans and Camille Benjamin 6–3, 6–3 in the final.

== Seeds ==
1. (Belgium) Sabine Appelmans / (United States) Camille Benjamin (final)
2. (United States) Shannan McCarthy / (France) Mary Pierce (quarterfinals)
3. (United States) Carrie Cunningham / (United States) Ann Grossman (semifinals)
4. (Canada) Rene Alter / (United States) Shaun Stafford (quarterfinals)

== Draw ==
Key

- Q = Qualifier
- WC = Wild card
- LL = Lucky loser
- Alt = Alternate
- ITF = ITF entry
- PR = Protected ranking
- SR = Special ranking
- SE = Special exempt
- JE = Junior exempt
- JR = Junior Accelerator Programme entrant
- CO = College Accelerator Programme entrant
- NG = Next Gen Accelerator Program entrant
- w/o = Walkover
- r = Retired
- d = Defaulted

=== Draw ===
First round
1	(Belgium) S Appelmans (United States) C Benjamin	6	6
(Brazil) L Corsato (Peru) P Vásquez	3	3
(Austria) P Ritter (United States) L Spadea	6	6
(South Africa) Lisa Seemann (United States) J Watanabe	3	1
4	(Canada) R Alter (United States) S Stafford	1	6	6
(United States) P O'Reilly (United States) Terri O'Reilly	6	4	4
(United States) J Fuchs (Sweden) M Strandlund	2	6	6
(South Africa) A Coetzer (United States) T Whittington	6	0	4
(United States) A Schwartz (Puerto Rico) E Viqueira	0	6	4
(Germany) S Hack (Germany) B Rittner	6	1	6
(United States) D Faber (Finland) P Thorén	3	5
3	(United States) C Cunningham (United States) A Grossman	6	7
(United States) L Allen (United States) A Keller	1	4
(Japan) R Hiraki (Argentina) F Labat	6	6
Q	(United States) Christine O'Reilly (Sri Lanka) L Weerasuriya	3	5
2	(United States) S McCarthy (France) M Pierce	6	7

Quarterfinals
1	(Belgium) S Appelmans (United States) C Benjamin	6	6
(Austria) P Ritter (United States) L Spadea	1	4
4	(Canada) R Alter (United States) S Stafford	6	1	3
(United States) J Fuchs (Sweden) M Strandlund	3	6	6
(Germany) S Hack (Germany) B Rittner	4	3
3	(United States) C Cunningham (United States) A Grossman	6	6
(Japan) R Hiraki (Argentina) F Labat	7	6
2	(United States) S McCarthy (France) M Pierce	5	3

Semifinals
1	(Belgium) S Appelmans (United States) C Benjamin	7^{8}	2
(United States) J Fuchs (Sweden) M Strandlund	6^{6}	1^{r}
3	(United States) C Cunningham (United States) A Grossman	4	2
(Japan) R Hiraki (Argentina) F Labat	6	6

Final
1	(Belgium) S Appelmans (United States) C Benjamin	3	3
(Japan) R Hiraki (Argentina) F Labat	6	6
