= 1992 Puerto Rico Open – Doubles =

Doubles
- 1992 Puerto Rico Open

Final
- Champions: (South Africa) Amanda Coetzer (South Africa) Elna Reinach
- Runners-up: (United States) Gigi Fernández (United States) Kathy Rinaldi
- Score: 6–2, 4–6, 6–2

Details
- Draw: 16 (1WC/1Q)
- Seeds: 4

Events
Singles	Doubles
- Puerto Rico Open

Rika Hiraki and Florencia Labat were the defending champions, but none competed this year.

Amanda Coetzer and Elna Reinach won the title by defeating Gigi Fernández and Kathy Rinaldi 6–2, 4–6, 6–2 in the final.

== Seeds ==
1. (United States) Gigi Fernández / (United States) Kathy Rinaldi (final)
2. (United States) Sandy Collins / (Argentina) Mercedes Paz (semifinals)
3. (South Africa) Amanda Coetzer / (South Africa) Elna Reinach (champions)
4. (United States) Debbie Graham / (United States) Marianne Werdel (semifinals)

== Draw ==
Key

- Q = Qualifier
- WC = Wild card
- LL = Lucky loser
- Alt = Alternate
- ITF = ITF entry
- PR = Protected ranking
- SR = Special ranking
- SE = Special exempt
- JE = Junior exempt
- JR = Junior Accelerator Programme entrant
- CO = College Accelerator Programme entrant
- NG = Next Gen Accelerator Program entrant
- w/o = Walkover
- r = Retired
- d = Defaulted

=== Draw ===
First round
1	(United States) G Fernández (United States) K Rinaldi	6	6
(United States) N Arendt (Germany) M Babel	2	3
(United States) H Cioffi (United States) A Keller	7	6
(United States) L Allen (France) S Amiach	5	4
4	(United States) D Graham (United States) M Werdel	5	6	6
(United States) Ta Whitlinger (United States) Te Whitlinger	7	4	3
WC	(Puerto Rico) Natalie Adsuar (Puerto Rico) Joanna Bauzá	0	1
(Mexico) L Novelo (United States) C Rubin	6	6
(United States) B Bowes (United States) T Whittington	6	2	6
(United States) C Cunningham (Canada) H Kelesi	4	6	4
Q	(United States) S Stafford (United States) L Raymond	2	3
3	(South Africa) A Coetzer (South Africa) E Reinach	6	6
(Netherlands) M Kiene (Finland) P Thorén	2	6	1
(United States) C Benjamin (United States) C Kuhlman	6	4	6
(United States) G Helgeson (United States) S McCarthy	2	4
2	(United States) S Collins (Argentina) M Paz	6	6

Quarterfinals
1	(United States) G Fernández (United States) K Rinaldi	6	6
(United States) H Cioffi (United States) A Keller	2	3
4	(United States) D Graham (United States) M Werdel	6	6
(Mexico) L Novelo (United States) C Rubin	4	0
(United States) B Bowes (United States) T Whittington	1	2
3	(South Africa) A Coetzer (South Africa) E Reinach	6	6
(United States) C Benjamin (United States) C Kuhlman	4	6^{7}
2	(United States) S Collins (Argentina) M Paz	6	7^{9}

Semifinals
1	(United States) G Fernández (United States) K Rinaldi	7^{7}	6
4	(United States) D Graham (United States) M Werdel	6^{5}	3
3	(South Africa) A Coetzer (South Africa) E Reinach	4	7	6
2	(United States) S Collins (Argentina) M Paz	6	5	3

Final
1	(United States) G Fernández (United States) K Rinaldi	2	6	2
3	(South Africa) A Coetzer (South Africa) E Reinach	6	4	6
