= 1995 Puerto Rico Open – Doubles =

Doubles
- 1995 Puerto Rico Open

Final
- Champions: (Germany) Karin Kschwendt (Canada) Rene Simpson
- Runners-up: (Italy) Laura Golarsa (United States) Linda Harvey-Wild
- Score: 6–2, 0–6, 6–4

Details
- Draw: 16
- Seeds: 4

Events
Singles	Doubles
← 1993 ·	Puerto Rico Open

Karin Kschwendt and Rene Simpson won in the final 6–2, 0–6, 6–4 against Laura Golarsa and Linda Harvey-Wild.

== Seeds ==
Champion seeds are indicated in bold text while text in italics indicates the round in which those seeds were eliminated.

1. (Argentina) ~~Inés Gorrochategui~~ / (Czech Republic) ~~Helena Suková~~ (withdrew)
2. (Italy) Laura Golarsa / (United States) Linda Harvey-Wild (final)
3. (Italy) Silvia Farina / (Belgium) Nancy Feber (semifinals)
4. (Canada) ~~Patricia Hy-Boulais~~ / (Germany) ~~Christina Singer~~ (withdrew)
5. (France) Alexia Dechaume-Balleret / (Argentina) Florencia Labat (semifinals)

== Draw ==
=== Key ===
- Q = Qualifier
- WC = Wild card
- LL = Lucky loser
- Alt = Alternate
- SE = Special exempt
- PR = Protected ranking
- ITF = ITF entry
- JE = Junior exempt
- w/o = Walkover
- r = Retired
- d = Defaulted
- SR = Special ranking

First round
LL	(Chile) P Cabezas (Puerto Rico) E Viqueira	1	3
(Germany) **K Kschwendt** (Canada) **R Simpson**	**6**	**6**
(France) K Quentrec-Eagle (France) S Testud	5	1
Q	(United States) **E deLone** (United States) **A Keller**	**7**	**6**
3	(Italy) **S Farina** (Belgium) **N Feber**	**6**	**6**
(United States) C Morariu (Netherlands) K de Weille	2	3
(Netherlands) **M Koutstaal** (Australia) **N Pratt**	**7^{7}**	**6**
(Romania) C Cristea (Slovakia) R Zrubáková	6^{1}	2
LL	(Austria) D Leupold (Germany) S Meier	**6**	1	1
(Canada) **M Bernard** (Canada) **C Delisle**	3	**6**	**6**
(Italy) R Grande (Slovakia) K Studeníková	3	**6**	6^{4}
5	(France) **A Dechaume-Balleret** (Argentina) **F Labat**	**6**	4	**7^{7}**
(South Africa) **J Kruger** (Italy) **E Savoldi**	**6**	**6**
(Georgia (country)) N Louarsabishvili (United States) V Sureephong	2	2
(Japan) R Hiraki (Slovenia) T Križan	**6**	3	3
2	(Italy) **L Golarsa** (United States) **L Harvey-Wild**	1	**6**	**6**

Quarterfinals
(Germany) **K Kschwendt** (Canada) **R Simpson**	**6**	**6**
Q	(United States) E deLone (United States) A Keller	4	0
3	(Italy) **S Farina** (Belgium) **N Feber**	**6**	**7**
(Netherlands) M Koutstaal (Australia) N Pratt	2	5
(Canada) M Bernard (Canada) C Delisle	4	4
5	(France) **A Dechaume-Balleret** (Argentina) **F Labat**	**6**	**6**
(South Africa) J Kruger (Italy) E Savoldi	2	3
2	(Italy) **L Golarsa** (United States) **L Harvey-Wild**	**6**	**6**

Semifinals
(Germany) **K Kschwendt** (Canada) **R Simpson**	**6**	**7**
3	(Italy) S Farina (Belgium) N Feber	4	5
5	(France) A Dechaume-Balleret (Argentina) F Labat	6^{2}	1
2	(Italy) **L Golarsa** (United States) **L Harvey-Wild**	**7^{7}**	**6**

Final
(Germany) **Karin Kschwendt** (Canada) **Rene Simpson**	**6**	0	**6**
2	(Italy) Laura Golarsa (United States) Linda Harvey-Wild	2	**6**	4
