= 1993 Puerto Rico Open – Singles =

Singles
- 1993 Puerto Rico Open

Final
- Champion: (United States) Linda Harvey-Wild
- Runner-up: (United States) Ann Grossman
- Score: 6–3, 5–7, 6–3

Details
- Draw: 32 (2WC/4Q)
- Seeds: 8

Events
Singles	Doubles
← 1992 ·	Puerto Rico Open	· 1995 →

Mary Pierce was the defending champion, but did not compete this year.

Linda Harvey-Wild won the title by defeating Ann Grossman 6–3, 5–7, 6–3 in the final.

== Seeds ==
1. (Netherlands) Brenda Schultz (first round, retired)
2. (United States) Ann Grossman (final)
3. (United States) Debbie Graham (semifinals)
4. (Mexico) Angélica Gavaldón (semifinals)
5. (Italy) Laura Golarsa (quarterfinals)
6. (Peru) Laura Gildemeister (first round)
7. (United States) Linda Harvey-Wild (champion)
8. (France) Karine Quentrec (second round)

== Draw ==
=== Key ===
- Q = Qualifier
- WC = Wild card
- LL = Lucky loser
- Alt = Alternate
- SE = Special exempt
- PR = Protected ranking
- ITF = ITF entry
- JE = Junior exempt
- w/o = Walkover
- r = Retired
- d = Defaulted
- SR = Special ranking

=== Finals ===
Semifinals
7	(United States) Linda Harvey-Wild	6	6
4	(Mexico) Angélica Gavaldón	3	3
3	(United States) Debbie Graham	4	5
2	(United States) Ann Grossman	6	7

Final
7	(United States) Linda Harvey-Wild	6	5	6
2	(United States) Ann Grossman	3	7	3

=== Top half ===
First round
1	(Netherlands) B Schultz	5^{r}
(Paraguay) R de los Ríos	4
(Paraguay) L Schaerer	2	1
WC	(Australia) R Stubbs	6	6
(United States) E deLone	7	6
(Belarus) T Ignatieva	5	2
(Australia) N Pratt	0	3
7	(United States) L Harvey-Wild	6	6
4	(Mexico) A Gavaldón	6	6
(United States) D Faber	4	1
(Brazil) L Tella	4	6	2
Q	(Peru) P Vásquez	6	2	6
(United States) L Allen	6	3	7^{7}
(France) S Amiach	4	6	6^{4}
(Kazakhstan) E Likhovtseva	4	2
5	(Italy) L Golarsa	6	6

Second round
(Paraguay) R de los Ríos	0	7^{8}	6
WC	(Australia) R Stubbs	6	6^{6}	4
(United States) E deLone	6^{4}	4
7	(United States) L Harvey-Wild	7^{7}	6
4	(Mexico) A Gavaldón	6	6
Q	(Peru) P Vásquez	2	1
(United States) L Allen	1^{r}
5	(Italy) L Golarsa	6

Quarterfinals
(Paraguay) R de los Ríos	4	2
7	(United States) L Harvey-Wild	6	6
4	(Mexico) A Gavaldón	6	6
5	(Italy) L Golarsa	4	3

Semifinals
7	(United States) L Harvey-Wild	6	6
4	(Mexico) A Gavaldón	3	3

=== Bottom half ===
First round
6/WC	(Peru) L Gildemeister	4	2
(France) N Herreman	6	6
(United States) A Keller	6	6
(Israel) Y Segal	0	1
(United States) C Neuman	7	7^{7}
(United States) S Cacic	5	6^{5}
(Germany) S Lohmann	7^{7}	5	3
3	(United States) D Graham	6^{1}	7	6
8	(France) K Quentrec	6	6
(Germany) M Kochta	3	2
(Canada) M Drake	3	7	2
Q	(Romania) C Cristea	6	5	6
Q	(United States) A Leand	5	2
Q	(Canada) S Jeyaseelan	7	6
(Greece) K Freye	3	2
2	(United States) A Grossman	6	6

Second round
(France) N Herreman	1	4
(United States) A Keller	6	6
(United States) C Neuman	1	1
3	(United States) D Graham	6	6
8	(France) K Quentrec	1	7	5
Q	(Romania) C Cristea	6	5	7
Q	(Canada) S Jeyaseelan	4	5
2	(United States) A Grossman	6	7

Quarterfinals
(United States) A Keller	6^{5}	2
3	(United States) D Graham	7^{7}	6
Q	(Romania) C Cristea	2	4
2	(United States) A Grossman	6	6

Semifinals
3	(United States) D Graham	4	5
2	(United States) A Grossman	6	7
