= 1995 Puerto Rico Open – Singles =

Singles
- 1995 Puerto Rico Open

Final
- Champion: (South Africa) Joannette Kruger
- Runner-up: (Japan) Kyōko Nagatsuka
- Score: 7–6^{(7–5)}, 6–3

Details
- Draw: 32 (2WC/4Q/1LL)
- Seeds: 8

Events
Singles	Doubles
← 1993 ·	Puerto Rico Open

Joannette Kruger won the final 7–6^{(7–5)}, 6–3 against Kyōko Nagatsuka.

== Seeds ==
A champion seed is indicated in bold text while text in italics indicates the round in which that seed was eliminated.

1. (Czech Republic) Helena Suková (first round, retired)
2. (France) Julie Halard (second round)
3. (Argentina) Inés Gorrochategui (second round)
4. (United States) Gigi Fernández (semifinals)
5. (Argentina) Florencia Labat (semifinals)
6. (Italy) Silvia Farina (quarterfinals)
7. (United States) Linda Harvey-Wild (second round)
8. (Japan) Kyōko Nagatsuka (final)

== Draw ==
=== Key ===
- Q = Qualifier
- WC = Wild card
- LL = Lucky loser
- Alt = Alternate
- SE = Special exempt
- PR = Protected ranking
- ITF = ITF entry
- JE = Junior exempt
- w/o = Walkover
- r = Retired
- d = Defaulted
- SR = Special ranking

First round
1	(Czech Republic) H Suková	**6**	3	0^{r}
(Italy) **A Serra Zanetti**	3	**6**	**1**
WC	(United States) C Morariu	1	3
(Belgium) **N Feber**	**6**	**6**
(Slovakia) R Zrubáková	0	4
(Slovakia) **K Studeníková**	**6**	**6**
(Germany) K Kschwendt	3	**7**	6^{5}
8	(Japan) **K Nagatsuka**	**6**	5	**7^{7}**
4	(United States) **G Fernández**	3	**6**	**6**
(Germany) S Meier	**6**	4	2
(Germany) **C Singer**	3	**6**	**6**
Q	(Netherlands) K de Weille	**6**	3	4
(Canada) **J Nejedly**	**6**	**6**
LL	(Italy) R Grande	4	4
(Italy) L Golarsa	6^{1}	2
6	(Italy) **S Farina**	**7^{7}**	**6**
7	(United States) **L Harvey-Wild**	**6**	**6**
WC	(Puerto Rico) K Brandi	3	3
Q	(Paraguay) L Schaerer	2	2
(France) **A D-Balleret**	**6**	**6**
Q	(Spain) C Torrens Valero	1	6^{3}
(South Africa) **J Kruger**	**6**	**7^{7}**
(Spain) M Sánchez Lorenzo	3	0
3	(Argentina) **I Gorrochategui**	**6**	**6**
5	(Argentina) **F Labat**	**6**	**6**
(Netherlands) S Rottier	2	3
(Slovenia) **T Križan**	**6**	**7^{7}**
(United States) A Keller	4	6^{3}
(Russia) T Panova	1	3
(France) **S Testud**	**6**	**6**
Q	(Chile) P Cabezas	2	3
2	(France) **J Halard**	**6**	**6**

Second round
(Italy) A Serra Zanetti	2	4
(Belgium) **N Feber**	**6**	**6**
(Slovakia) K Studeníková	3	**6**	3
8	(Japan) **K Nagatsuka**	**6**	4	**6**
4	(United States) **G Fernández**	**6**	**6**
(Germany) C Singer	1	3
(Canada) J Nejedly	4	3
6	(Italy) **S Farina**	**6**	**6**
7	(United States) L Harvey-Wild	**7**	3	4
(France) **A D-Balleret**	5	**6**	**6**
(South Africa) **J Kruger**	**6**	**6**
3	(Argentina) I Gorrochategui	3	4
5	(Argentina) **F Labat**	**6**	**7**
(Slovenia) T Križan	3	5
(France) **S Testud**	**6**	**6**
2	(France) J Halard	4	4

Quarterfinals
(Belgium) N Feber	4	4
8	(Japan) **K Nagatsuka**	**6**	**6**
4	(United States) **G Fernández**	**6**	2	**6**
6	(Italy) S Farina	4	**6**	3
(France) A D-Balleret	3	3
(South Africa) **J Kruger**	**6**	**6**
5	(Argentina) **F Labat**	2	**6**	**7^{8}**
(France) S Testud	**6**	1	6^{6}

Semifinals
8	(Japan) **K Nagatsuka**	6^{5}	**6**	**7**
4	(United States) G Fernández	**7^{7}**	1	5
(South Africa) **J Kruger**	**6**	**7**
5	(Argentina) F Labat	3	5

Final
8	(Japan) Kyōko Nagatsuka	6^{5}	3
(South Africa) **Joannette Kruger**	**7^{7}**	**6**
