= 1996 Australian Open – Women's singles qualifying =

Women's singles qualifying
- 1996 Australian Open

Events
Singles	men	women		boys	girls
Doubles	men	women	mixed	boys	girls
WC Singles	men	women	quad
WC Doubles	men	women	quad
Legends	men	women	mixed

Qualification
Singles	men	women
- Australian Open

This article displays the qualifying draw for women's singles at the 1996 Australian Open.

== Seeds ==
1. (Germany) Andrea Glass (first round)
2. (Czech Republic) Radka Bobková (second round)
3. (United States) Jolene Watanabe (qualified)
4. (Czech Republic) Petra Langrová (first round)
5. (United States) Audra Keller (first round)
6. (Slovakia) Denisa Krajčovičová (qualifying competition)
7. (Czech Republic) Lenka Němečková (first round)
8. (United States) Laxmi Poruri (qualified)
9. (West Germany) Wiltrud Probst (first round)
10. (France) Alexia Dechaume-Balleret (qualified)
11. (Germany) Claudia Porwik (first round)
12. (Switzerland) Patty Schnyder (first round)
13. (Japan) Rika Hiraki (qualified)
14. (Italy) Laura Golarsa (second round)
15. (Georgia (country)) Nino Louarsabishvili (second round)
16. (Russia) Eugenia Maniokova (second round)

== Qualifiers ==
1. (United States) Janet Lee
2. (Japan) Rika Hiraki
3. (United States) Jolene Watanabe
4. (Italy) Francesca Lubiani
5. (United States) Laxmi Poruri
6. (United Kingdom) Clare Wood
7. (France) Alexia Dechaume-Balleret
8. (Canada) Sonya Jeyaseelan

== Qualifying draw ==
Key

- Q = Qualifier
- WC = Wild card
- LL = Lucky loser
- Alt = Alternate
- ITF = ITF entry
- PR = Protected ranking
- SR = Special ranking
- SE = Special exempt
- JE = Junior exempt
- JR = Junior Accelerator Programme entrant
- CO = College Accelerator Programme entrant
- NG = Next Gen Accelerator Program entrant
- w/o = Walkover
- r = Retired
- d = Defaulted

=== First qualifier ===
First round
1	(Germany) Andrea Glass	2	4
(United States) Janet Lee	6	6
(Netherlands) Manon Bollegraf	7	4	5
(Japan) Hiromi Nagano	5	6	7
(Japan) Miho Saeki	6	6
(Poland) Magdalena Feistel	4	1
(South Korea) Choi Ju-yeon	6^{6}	1
15	(Georgia (country)) Nino Louarsabishvili	7^{8}	6

Second round
(United States) Janet Lee	6	6
(Japan) Hiromi Nagano	4	2
(Japan) Miho Saeki	6	6
15	(Georgia (country)) Nino Louarsabishvili	2	3

Qualifying competition
(United States) Janet Lee	6	6
(Japan) Miho Saeki	3	2

=== Second qualifier ===
First round
13	(Japan) Rika Hiraki	6	6
(Greece) Christína Papadáki	2	2
(Belarus) Olga Barabanschikova	4	6^{3}
(Italy) Laura Garrone	6	7^{7}
WC	(Australia) Louise Pleming	2	1
(France) Amélie Mauresmo	6	6
(United States) Elly Hakami	6	6
5	(United States) Audra Keller	4	3

Second round
13	(Japan) Rika Hiraki	6	3	6
(Italy) Laura Garrone	2	6	4
(France) Amélie Mauresmo	6^{5}	1
(United States) Elly Hakami	7^{7}	6

Qualifying competition
13	(Japan) Rika Hiraki	6	6
(United States) Elly Hakami	3	4

=== Third qualifier ===
First round
3	(United States) Jolene Watanabe	6	6
WC	(Australia) Angie Woolcock	3	1
(France) Sophie Georges	6	6
(Netherlands) Caroline Vis	3	3
(Japan) Yuka Yoshida	7^{7}	6
(South Korea) Jeon Mi-ra	6^{5}	3
(Australia) Catherine Barclay	3	6	6
9	(West Germany) Wiltrud Probst	6	3	1

Second round
3	(United States) Jolene Watanabe	6	7
(France) Sophie Georges	4	5
(Japan) Yuka Yoshida	2	6	6
(Australia) Catherine Barclay	6	4	3

Qualifying competition
3	(United States) Jolene Watanabe	6	3	6
(Japan) Yuka Yoshida	1	6	4

=== Fourth qualifier ===
First round
12	(Switzerland) Patty Schnyder	3	3
WC	(Australia) Renee Reid	6	6
(Italy) Francesca Lubiani	6	7
(Netherlands) Kim de Weille	4	5
(Canada) Rene Simpson	6	6
(South Korea) Kim Eun-ha	2	3
(United States) Tara Snyder	6	6
7	(Czech Republic) Lenka Němečková	4	1

Second round
WC	(Australia) Renee Reid	2	2
(Italy) Francesca Lubiani	6	6
(Canada) Rene Simpson	4	6	6
(United States) Tara Snyder	6	1	3

Qualifying competition
(Italy) Francesca Lubiani	6	6
(Canada) Rene Simpson	3	0

=== Fifth qualifier ===
First round
8	(United States) Laxmi Poruri	3	6	6
WC	(Australia) Anna Klim	6	3	1
WC	(Australia) Shannon Peters	7	7^{7}
(Italy) Federica Fortuni	5	6^{2}
(France) Nathalie Dechy	6	6
(Netherlands) Seda Noorlander	4	4
WC	(Australia) Melissa Beadman	4	6	4
16	(Russia) Eugenia Maniokova	6	3	6

Second round
8	(United States) Laxmi Poruri	6	6
WC	(Australia) Shannon Peters	0	1
(France) Nathalie Dechy	2	6	6
16	(Russia) Eugenia Maniokova	6	2	3

Qualifying competition
8	(United States) Laxmi Poruri	6	6
(France) Nathalie Dechy	2	4

=== Sixth qualifier ===
First round
11	(Germany) Claudia Porwik	6	6^{5}	6
(Hungary) Virág Csurgó	2	7^{7}	8
(United Kingdom) Clare Wood	7^{7}	3	6
(United States) Christine Neuman	6^{4}	6	3
WC	(Australia) Lisa McShea	6	7^{7}
(France) Karine Quentrec	3	6^{3}
(Spain) Alicia Ortuño	5	7	9
4	(Czech Republic) Petra Langrová	7	5	7

Second round
(Hungary) Virág Csurgó	1	1
(United Kingdom) Clare Wood	6	6
WC	(Australia) Lisa McShea	6	7^{7}
(Spain) Alicia Ortuño	1	6^{2}

Qualifying competition
(United Kingdom) Clare Wood	6	6
WC	(Australia) Lisa McShea	4	1

=== Seventh qualifier ===
First round
6	(Slovakia) Denisa Krajčovičová	6	7
(Bulgaria) Katerina Maleeva	1	5
(Czech Republic) Helena Vildová	1	6	0
(Poland) Aleksandra Olsza	6	4	6
WC	(Australia) Joanne Limmer	7	7
(Japan) Misumi Miyauchi	5	5
(Thailand) Tamarine Tanasugarn	5	1
10	(France) Alexia Dechaume-Balleret	7	6

Second round
6	(Slovakia) Denisa Krajčovičová	7	6
(Poland) Aleksandra Olsza	5	4
WC	(Australia) Joanne Limmer	2	6	4
10	(France) Alexia Dechaume-Balleret	6	1	6

Qualifying competition
6	(Slovakia) Denisa Krajčovičová	4	2
10	(France) Alexia Dechaume-Balleret	6	6

=== Eighth qualifier ===
First round
14	(Italy) Laura Golarsa	7	6
(Argentina) Mercedes Paz	5	2
(Canada) Sonya Jeyaseelan	6	6
(Czech Republic) Eva Melicharová	1	1
(Czech Republic) Ludmila Varmužová	5	3
(Czech Republic) Adriana Gerši	7	6
(South Africa) Tessa Price	4	6	3
2	(Czech Republic) Radka Bobková	6	3	6

Second round
14	(Italy) Laura Golarsa	2	6^{1}
(Canada) Sonya Jeyaseelan	6	7^{7}
(Czech Republic) Adriana Gerši	6	4	6
2	(Czech Republic) Radka Bobková	2	6	2

Qualifying competition
(Canada) Sonya Jeyaseelan	6	6
(Czech Republic) Adriana Gerši	0	1
