= 1992 Puerto Rico Open – Singles =

Singles
- 1992 Puerto Rico Open

Final
- Champion: (France) Mary Pierce
- Runner-up: (United States) Gigi Fernández
- Score: 6–1, 7–5

Details
- Draw: 32 (2WC/4Q)
- Seeds: 8

Events
| Singles | Doubles |
| ← 1991 · | Puerto Rico Open | · 1993 → |

Julie Halard was the defending champion, but lost in the second round to Ginger Helgeson.

Mary Pierce won the title by defeating Gigi Fernández 6–1, 7–5 in the final.

== Seeds ==
1. (France) Mary Pierce (champion)
2. (South Africa) Amanda Coetzer (quarterfinals)
3. (France) Julie Halard (second round)
4. (United States) Gigi Fernández (final)
5. (United States) Carrie Cunningham (first round)
6. (United States) Chanda Rubin (second round)
7. (United States) Marianne Werdel (second round)
8. (United States) Debbie Graham (semifinals)

== Draw ==
=== Key ===
- Q = Qualifier
- WC = Wild card
- LL = Lucky loser
- Alt = Alternate
- SE = Special exempt
- PR = Protected ranking
- ITF = ITF entry
- JE = Junior exempt
- w/o = Walkover
- r = Retired
- d = Defaulted
- SR = Special ranking

=== Finals ===
Semifinals
1 | (France) Mary Pierce | 6 | 6
(United States) Louise Allen | 1 | 4
4 | (United States) Gigi Fernández | 6 | 6
8 | (United States) Debbie Graham | 1 | 2

Final
1 | (France) Mary Pierce | 6 | 7
4 | (United States) Gigi Fernández | 1 | 5

=== Top half ===
First round
1 | (France) M Pierce | 6 | 4 | 6
(Switzerland) C Fauche | 1 | 6 | 0
(South Africa) E Reinach | 6 | 6
Q | (United States) S McCarthy | 4 | 2
(Finland) P Thorén | 5 | 3
Q | (United States) N Arendt | 7 | 6
(Croatia) I Majoli | 3 | 4
7 | (United States) M Werdel | 6 | 6
3 | (France) J Halard | 6 | 6
(United States) D Faber | 1 | 2
(United States) G Helgeson | 3 | 6 | 7^{7}
(United States) T Whitlinger | 6 | 0 | 6^{4}
(United States) L Allen | 6 | 6
(Germany) M Kochta | 2 | 3
(Netherlands) K Boogert | 2 | 3
6 | (United States) C Rubin | 6 | 6

Second round
1 | (France) M Pierce | 6 | 7
(South Africa) E Reinach | 3 | 5
Q | (United States) N Arendt | 6 | 6^{4} | 7
7 | (United States) M Werdel | 3 | 7^{7} | 5
3 | (France) J Halard | 4 | 0
(United States) G Helgeson | 6 | 6
(United States) L Allen | 6 | 7
6 | (United States) C Rubin | 3 | 5

Quarterfinals
1 | (France) M Pierce | 6 | 6
Q | (United States) N Arendt | 0 | 1
(United States) G Helgeson | 3 | 6 | 3
(United States) L Allen | 6 | 4 | 6

Semifinals
1 | (France) M Pierce | 6 | 6
(United States) L Allen | 1 | 4

=== Bottom half ===
First round
5 | (United States) C Cunningham | 5 | 6 | 6^{5}
WC | (Mexico) A Gavaldón | 7 | 4 | 7^{7}
WC | (Puerto Rico) E Viqueira | 5 | 2
Q | (United States) L Raymond | 7 | 6
(United States) K Rinaldi | 7 | 6
(United States) A Keller | 5 | 4
(Argentina) M Paz | 2 | 6 | 1
4 | (United States) G Fernández | 6 | 3 | 6
8 | (United States) D Graham | 6 | 6
Q | (United States) E deLone | 0 | 1
(Germany) M Babel | 7^{11} | 1 | 6
(Chinese Taipei) S-t Wang | 6^{9} | 6 | 3
(United States) H Cioffi | 6 | 6^{3} | 6
(Canada) H Kelesi | 4 | 7^{7} | 2
(United States) C Kuhlman | 2 | 1
2 | (South Africa) A Coetzer | 6 | 6

Second round
WC | (Mexico) A Gavaldón | 4 | 4
Q | (United States) L Raymond | 6 | 6
(United States) K Rinaldi | 3 | 3
4 | (United States) G Fernández | 6 | 6
8 | (United States) D Graham | 6 | 6
(Germany) M Babel | 0 | 3
(United States) H Cioffi | 3 | 6 | 3
2 | (South Africa) A Coetzer | 6 | 3 | 6

Quarterfinals
Q | (United States) L Raymond | 5 | 3
4 | (United States) G Fernández | 7 | 6
8 | (United States) D Graham | 6 | 3 | 6
2 | (South Africa) A Coetzer | 2 | 6 | 3

Semifinals
4 | (United States) G Fernández | 6 | 6
8 | (United States) D Graham | 1 | 2
