= 1993 Puerto Rico Open – Doubles =

Doubles
- 1993 Puerto Rico Open

Final
- Champions: (United States) Debbie Graham (United States) Ann Grossman
- Runners-up: (United States) Gigi Fernández (Australia) Rennae Stubbs
- Score: 5–7, 7–5, 7–5

Details
- Draw: 16 (1WC/1Q/LL)
- Seeds: 4

Events
Singles	Doubles
- Puerto Rico Open

Amanda Coetzer and Elna Reinach were the defending champions, but both players chose to rest after competing in the Fed Cup the previous week.

Debbie Graham and Ann Grossman won the title by defeating Gigi Fernández and Rennae Stubbs 5–7, 7–5, 7–5 in the final.

== Seeds ==
1. (United States) Gigi Fernández / (Australia) Rennae Stubbs (final)
2. (United States) Debbie Graham / (United States) Ann Grossman (champions)
3. (United States) Linda Harvey-Wild / (United States) Audra Keller (semifinals)
4. (United States) Louise Allen / (Italy) Laura Golarsa (quarterfinals, withdrew)

== Draw ==
Key

- Q = Qualifier
- WC = Wild card
- LL = Lucky loser
- Alt = Alternate
- ITF = ITF entry
- PR = Protected ranking
- SR = Special ranking
- SE = Special exempt
- JE = Junior exempt
- JR = Junior Accelerator Programme entrant
- CO = College Accelerator Programme entrant
- NG = Next Gen Accelerator Program entrant
- w/o = Walkover
- r = Retired
- d = Defaulted

=== Draw ===
First round
1	(United States) G Fernández (Australia) R Stubbs	6	6
(United States) Kay Louthian (Canada) M Nejedly	4	2
LL	(Moldova) S Komleva (Georgia (country)) N Louarsabishvili	7^{7}	3	1
(United States) A deLone (United States) E deLone	6^{5}	6	6
3	(United States) L Harvey-Wild (United States) A Keller	6	6
WC	(Puerto Rico) Joanna Bauzá (Puerto Rico) E Viqueira	2	0
(Paraguay) R de los Ríos (Paraguay) L Schaerer	3	5
(Romania) C Cristea (Sweden) M Ekstrand	6	7
(France) A Amiach (Peru) L Gildemeister
(Canada) M Drake (Germany) S Lohmann	w/o
(France) N Herreman (Israel) T Obziler	6^{2}	2
4	(United States) L Allen (Italy) L Golarsa	7^{7}	6
Q	(United States) Kellie Dorman-Tyrone (Republic of Ireland) Philippa Palmer	2	2
(Kazakhstan) E Likhovtseva (Australia) N Pratt	6	6
(Israel) Y Segal (Israel) L Zaltz	6^{3}	3
2	(United States) D Graham (United States) A Grossman	7^{7}	6

Quarterfinals
1	(United States) G Fernández (Australia) R Stubbs	6	6
(United States) A deLone (United States) E deLone	3	4
3	(United States) L Harvey-Wild (United States) A Keller	6	7^{7}
(Romania) C Cristea (Sweden) M Ekstrand	2	6^{2}
(Canada) M Drake (Germany) S Lohmann	w/o
4	(United States) L Allen (Italy) L Golarsa
(Kazakhstan) E Likhovtseva (Australia) N Pratt	3	3
2	(United States) D Graham (United States) A Grossman	6	6

Semifinals
1	(United States) G Fernández (Australia) R Stubbs	6	3	6
3	(United States) L Harvey-Wild (United States) A Keller	3	6	1
(Canada) M Drake (Germany) S Lohmann	1	3
2	(United States) D Graham (United States) A Grossman	6	6

Final
1	(United States) G Fernández (Australia) R Stubbs	7	5	5
2	(United States) D Graham (United States) A Grossman	5	7	7
