= 1995 Puerto Rico Open =

- Date: February 27 – March 5
- Edition: 9th
- Category: Tier III
- Draw: 32S /16D
- Prize money: $162,250
- Surface: Hard / outdoor
- Location: San Juan, Puerto Rico
- Venue: San Juan Central Park

Champions

Singles
- (South Africa) Joannette Kruger

Doubles
- (Germany) Karin Kschwendt / (Canada) Rene Simpson
← 1993 ·	Puerto Rico Open

The 1995 Puerto Rico Open was a women's tennis tournament played on outdoor hard courts at the San Juan Central Park in San Juan in Puerto Rico that was part of Tier III of the 1995 WTA Tour. It was the ninth and last edition of the tournament and was held from February 27 through March 5, 1995. Unseeded Joannette Kruger won the singles title.

== Finals ==
=== Singles ===
(South Africa) Joannette Kruger defeated (Japan) Kyōko Nagatsuka 7–6^{(7–5)}, 6–3

- It was Kruger's only title of the year and the 1st of her career.

=== Doubles ===
(Germany) Karin Kschwendt / (Canada) Rene Simpson defeated (Italy) Laura Golarsa / (United States) Linda Harvey-Wild 6–2, 0–6, 6–4

- It was Kschwendt's only title of the year and the 6th of her career. It was Simpson's 1st title of the year and the 2nd of her career.
