= 1991 Puerto Rico Open =

Tennis tournament

- Date: October 21–27
- Edition: 6th
- Category: Tier IV
- Draw: 32S / 16D
- Prize money: $150,000
- Surface: Hard / outdoor
- Location: San Juan, Puerto Rico
- Venue: Hyatt Regency Cerromar Hotel

Champions

Singles
- (France) Julie Halard

Doubles
- (Japan) Rika Hiraki / (Argentina) Florencia Labat
← 1990 ·	Puerto Rico Open	· 1992 →

The 1991 Puerto Rico Open was a women's tennis tournament played on outdoor hard courts at the Hyatt Regency Cerromar Hotel in San Juan in Puerto Rico that was part of the Tier IV category of the 1991 WTA Tour. It was the sixth edition of the tournament and was held from October 21 through October 27, 1991. Second-seeded Julie Halard won the singles title and earned $27,000 first-prize money.

== Finals ==
=== Singles ===
(France) Julie Halard defeated (South Africa) Amanda Coetzer 7–5, 7–5

- It was Halard's 1st singles title of her career.

=== Doubles ===
(Japan) Rika Hiraki / (Argentina) Florencia Labat defeated (Belgium) Sabine Appelmans / (United States) Camille Benjamin 6–3, 6–3
