= 1993 Puerto Rico Open =

- Date: July 26 – August 1
- Edition: 8th
- Category: Tier IV
- Draw: 32S /16D
- Prize money: $150,000
- Surface: Hard / outdoor
- Location: San Juan, Puerto Rico
- Venue: San Juan Central Park

Champions

Singles
- (United States) Linda Harvey-Wild

Doubles
- (United States) Debbie Graham / (United States) Ann Grossman
← 1992 ·	Puerto Rico Open	· 1995 →

The 1993 Puerto Rico Open was a women's tennis tournament played on outdoor hard courts at the San Juan Central Park in San Juan in Puerto Rico that was part of the Tier IV category of the 1993 WTA Tour. It was the eighth edition of the tournament and was held from July 26 through August 1, 1993. Seventh-seeded Linda Harvey-Wild won the singles title and earned $27,000 first-prize money.

== Finals ==
=== Singles ===
(United States) Linda Harvey-Wild defeated (United States) Ann Grossman 6–3, 5–7, 6–3

- It was Harvey-Wild's 1st singles title of her career.

=== Doubles ===
(United States) Debbie Graham / (United States) Ann Grossman defeated (United States) Gigi Fernández / (Australia) Rennae Stubbs 5–7, 7–5, 7–5
