= 1992 Puerto Rico Open =

Tennis tournament

- Date: October 26 – November 1
- Edition: 7th
- Category: Tier IV
- Draw: 32S / 16D
- Prize money: $150,000
- Surface: Hard / outdoor
- Location: San Juan, Puerto Rico
- Venue: San Juan Central Park

Champions

Singles
- (France) Mary Pierce

Doubles
- (South Africa) Amanda Coetzer / (South Africa) Elna Reinach
← 1991 ·	Puerto Rico Open	· 1993 →

The 1992 Puerto Rico Open was a women's tennis tournament played on outdoor hard courts at the San Juan Central Park in San Juan in Puerto Rico that was part of the Tier IV category of the 1992 WTA Tour. It was the seventh edition of the tournament and was held from October 26 through November 1, 1992. First-seeded Mary Pierce won the singles title and earned $27,000 first-prize money.

== Finals ==
=== Singles ===
(France) Mary Pierce defeated (United States) Gigi Fernández 6–1, 7–5

- It was Pierce's 3rd singles title of the year and the 4th of her career.

=== Doubles ===
(South Africa) Amanda Coetzer / (South Africa) Elna Reinach defeated (United States) Gigi Fernández / (United States) Kathy Rinaldi 6–2, 4–6, 6–2
