= 1996 French Open – Women's singles qualifying =

Women's singles qualifying
- 1996 French Open

Events
Singles	men	women		boys	girls
Doubles	men	women	mixed	boys	girls
WC Singles	men	women	quad
WC Doubles	men	women	quad
Legends	−45	45+	women

Qualification
Singles	men	women
- French Open

Players who neither had high enough rankings nor received wild cards to enter the main draw of the annual French Open Tennis Championships participated in a qualifying tournament held in the week before the event.

== Seeds ==
1. (Italy) Gloria Pizzichini (qualifying competition, lucky loser)
2. (Austria) Melanie Schnell (qualifying competition, lucky loser)
3. (Spain) Ángeles Montolio (qualified)
4. (Italy) Francesca Lubiani (qualified)
5. (Spain) Gala León García (qualified)
6. (Madagascar) Dally Randriantefy (qualifying competition, lucky loser)
7. (United States) Corina Morariu (first round)
8. (Canada) Jana Nejedly (qualified)
9. (Czech Republic) Sandra Kleinová (second round)
10. (Italy) Flora Perfetti (qualified)
11. (Finland) Nanne Dahlman (qualifying competition)
12. (Italy) Sandra Cecchini (qualified)
13. (United States) Meilen Tu (first round)
14. (Austria) Petra Schwarz (first round)
15. (United States) Erika deLone (second round)
16. (Australia) Rachel McQuillan (qualified)

== Qualifiers ==
1. (Italy) Flora Perfetti
2. (Italy) Sandra Cecchini
3. (Italy) Francesca Lubiani
4. (Spain) Gala León García
5. (Canada) Jana Nejedly
6. (Spain) Ángeles Montolio
7. (Czech Republic) Petra Langrová
8. (Australia) Rachel McQuillan

== Lucky losers ==
1. (Italy) Gloria Pizzichini
2. (Austria) Melanie Schnell
3. (Madagascar) Dally Randriantefy

== Qualifying draw ==
Key

- Q = Qualifier
- WC = Wild card
- LL = Lucky loser
- Alt = Alternate
- ITF = ITF entry
- PR = Protected ranking
- SR = Special ranking
- SE = Special exempt
- JE = Junior exempt
- JR = Junior Accelerator Programme entrant
- CO = College Accelerator Programme entrant
- NG = Next Gen Accelerator Program entrant
- w/o = Walkover
- r = Retired
- d = Defaulted

=== First qualifier ===
First round
1	(Italy) Gloria Pizzichini	6	6
(United States) Janet Lee	0	1
(Netherlands) Stephanie Rottier	6	7^{7}
(United States) Christine Neuman	4	6^{4}
(Luxembourg) Anne Kremer	6	6
(Spain) Paula Hermida	3	3
WC	(France) Isabelle Taesch	3	0
10	(Italy) Flora Perfetti	6	6

Second round
1	(Italy) Gloria Pizzichini	7	6
(Netherlands) Stephanie Rottier	5	3
(Luxembourg) Anne Kremer	6	3	2
10	(Italy) Flora Perfetti	2	6	6

Qualifying competition
1	(Italy) Gloria Pizzichini	5	1
10	(Italy) Flora Perfetti	7	6

=== Second qualifier ===
First round
12	(Italy) Sandra Cecchini	7	6
(Sweden) Maria Strandlund	5	2
(Australia) Annabel Ellwood	6^{3}	3
(France) Virginie Buisson	7^{7}	6
(Slovenia) Tina Križan	6	3	5
(Japan) Yuka Yoshida	4	6	7
(China) Chen Li-Ling	4	6	7
7	(United States) Corina Morariu	6	4	5

Second round
12	(Italy) Sandra Cecchini	7	4	6
(France) Virginie Buisson	5	6	0
(Japan) Yuka Yoshida	6	6
(China) Chen Li-Ling	4	3

Qualifying competition
12	(Italy) Sandra Cecchini	4	6	6
(Japan) Yuka Yoshida	6	1	1

=== Third qualifier ===
First round
4	(Italy) Francesca Lubiani	6	6
(Russia) Tatiana Panova	1	4
(Ukraine) Olga Lugina	6	6
(Australia) Nicole Pratt	2	3
WC	(France) Kildine Chevalier	1	2
WC	(France) Ségolène Berger	6	6
(Argentina) Mercedes Paz	6	4
13	(United States) Meilen Tu	4	1^{r}

Second round
4	(Italy) Francesca Lubiani	6	4	6
(Ukraine) Olga Lugina	2	6	2
WC	(France) Ségolène Berger	2	0
(Argentina) Mercedes Paz	6	6

Qualifying competition
4	(Italy) Francesca Lubiani	6	7
(Argentina) Mercedes Paz	4	5

=== Fourth qualifier ===
First round
15	(United States) Erika deLone	6	6
(United Kingdom) Clare Wood	4	1
(Austria) Marion Maruska	4	6	6
(Canada) Sonya Jeyaseelan	6	2	2
(France) Noëlle van Lottum	5	6	4
(Poland) Aleksandra Olsza	7	2	6
(Canada) Rene Simpson	4	2
5	(Spain) Gala León García	6	6

Second round
15	(United States) Erika deLone	6^{3}	1
(Austria) Marion Maruska	7^{7}	6
(Poland) Aleksandra Olsza	3	2
5	(Spain) Gala León García	6	6

Qualifying competition
(Austria) Marion Maruska	3	5
5	(Spain) Gala León García	6	7

=== Fifth qualifier ===
First round
8	(Canada) Jana Nejedly	6	3	6
(Germany) Marketa Kochta	3	6	4
(United States) Debbie Graham	6	6
WC	(France) Karolina Jagieniak	3	0
(Czech Republic) Lenka Němečková	2	4
WC	(France) Amélie Oudéa-Castéra	6	6
(Slovakia) Denisa Krajčovičová	2	4
11	(Finland) Nanne Dahlman	6	6

Second round
8	(Canada) Jana Nejedly	6	2	6
(United States) Debbie Graham	4	6	2
WC	(France) Amélie Oudéa-Castéra	2	6^{6}
11	(Finland) Nanne Dahlman	6	7^{8}

Qualifying competition
8	(Canada) Jana Nejedly	7^{7}	6
11	(Finland) Nanne Dahlman	6^{4}	2

=== Sixth qualifier ===
First round
9	(Czech Republic) Sandra Kleinová	2	6	6
(Belarus) Tatiana Ignatieva	6	4	0
(Greece) Christína Papadáki	4	3
Alt	(Japan) Miho Saeki	6	6
(Italy) Gabriella Boschiero	6	6
(United States) Laxmi Poruri	4	2
(Ukraine) Elena Tatarkova	4	3
3	(Spain) Ángeles Montolio	6	6

Second round
9	(Czech Republic) Sandra Kleinová	3	5
Alt	(Japan) Miho Saeki	6	7
(Italy) Gabriella Boschiero	6^{2}	5
3	(Spain) Ángeles Montolio	7^{7}	7

Qualifying competition
Alt	(Japan) Miho Saeki	6^{10}	3
3	(Spain) Ángeles Montolio	7^{12}	6

=== Seventh qualifier ===
First round
6	(Madagascar) Dally Randriantefy	4	7	7
(Switzerland) Emanuela Zardo	6	5	5
(Spain) Mariam Ramón Climent	6^{7}	2
(Germany) Wiltrud Probst	7^{9}	6
(Czech Republic) Petra Langrová	6	6
(Canada) Maureen Drake	2	3
(United States) Kristina Brandi	7	6
14	(Austria) Petra Schwarz	5	1

Second round
6	(Madagascar) Dally Randriantefy	6	6
(Germany) Wiltrud Probst	3	0
(Czech Republic) Petra Langrová	6	6
(United States) Kristina Brandi	4	2

Qualifying competition
6	(Madagascar) Dally Randriantefy	4	6^{5}
(Czech Republic) Petra Langrová	6	7^{7}

=== Eighth qualifier ===
First round
16	(Australia) Rachel McQuillan	6	6
WC	(France) Karine Quentrec	3	4
(Spain) Silvia Ramón-Cortés	6^{5}	5
WC	(Bulgaria) Katerina Maleeva	7^{7}	7
WC	(France) Virginie Massart	0	1
(Hungary) Virág Csurgó	6	6
(Netherlands) Kim de Weille	3	3
2	(Austria) Melanie Schnell	6	6

Second round
16	(Australia) Rachel McQuillan	6	6
WC	(Bulgaria) Katerina Maleeva	1	2
(Hungary) Virág Csurgó	7^{7}	3	2
2	(Austria) Melanie Schnell	6^{0}	6	6

Qualifying competition
16	(Australia) Rachel McQuillan	6	6
2	(Austria) Melanie Schnell	4	1
