= Christine Neuman =

American tennis player

- Country (sports): United States
- Born: July 14, 1972 (age 52)
- Prize money: $28,635

Singles
- Career record: 52–43
- Career titles: 1 ITF
- Highest ranking: No. 171 (June 17, 1996)

Grand Slam singles results
- Australian Open: Q1 (1996)
- French Open: Q1 (1996)
- Wimbledon: Q1 (1996)
- US Open: Q1 (1996)

Christine Neuman (born July 14, 1972) is an American former professional tennis player.

Neuman, who was raised in Chicago, played college tennis for Duke University in the early 1990s, twice earning All-American honors.

Her best performance on the WTA Tour came in 1993 when she made the second round of the Puerto Rico Open, with a win over Sandra Cacic.

In 1996 she reached her career high singles ranking of 171 in the world and featured in the qualifying draws of all four grand slam tournaments that year.

== ITF finals ==
=== Singles: 5 (1–4) ===
Legend
$25,000 tournaments
$10,000 tournaments

Result	No.	Date	Tournament	Surface	Opponent	Score
Win	1.	July 4, 1993	Columbia, United States	Hard	(United States) Annie Miller	7–5, 6–7^{(5)}, 6–2
Loss	1.	July 11, 1993	Indianapolis, United States	Hard	(Venezuela) María Vento	4–6, 6–3, 4–6
Loss	2.	November 13, 1994	Buenos Aires, Argentina	Clay	(France) Anne-Sophie Bittighoffer	6–3, 3–6, 2–6
Loss	3.	July 23, 1995	Wilmington, United States	Hard	(United States) Erika deLone	6–3, 1–6, 3–6
Loss	4.	October 22, 1995	Hallandale Beach, United States	Hard	(Canada) Sonya Jeyaseelan	2–6, 6–4, 4–6
