= WTA Nagoya =

TVA Cup Ladies Open

Defunct tennis tournament
- Event name: TVA Cup Ladies Open
- Tour: WTA Tier IV (1995)
- Founded: 1995
- Abolished: 1995
- Location: Nagoya, Japan
- Surface: Carpets (1995)

This is a defunct women's tennis tournament on the WTA Tour that was held just once, in 1995. It was held in Nagoya, Japan from September 11 to September 17 and was a Tier IV event. The official name of the tournament was the TVA Cup Ladies Open.

== Finals ==
=== Singles ===
Year	Champion	Runner-up	Score
1995	(United States) Linda Wild	(Czech Republic) Sandra Kleinová	6–4, 6–2

=== Doubles ===
Year	Champions	Runners-up	Score
1995	(Australia) Kerry-Anne Guse (Australia) Kristine Radford	(Japan) Rika Hiraki (South Korea) Park Sung-hee	6–4, 6–4

== See also ==
- List of tennis tournaments
