= 1994 Virginia Slims Championships – Doubles =

Doubles
- 1994 Virginia Slims Championships

Final
- Champions: (United States) Gigi Fernández (Belarus) Natasha Zvereva
- Runners-up: (Czech Republic) Jana Novotná (Spain) Arantxa Sánchez Vicario
- Score: 6–3, 6–7^{(4–7)}, 6–3

Details
- Draw: 8
- Seeds: 4

Events
Singles	Doubles
← 1993 ·	Virginia Slims Championships	· 1995 →

Defending champions Gigi Fernández and Natasha Zvereva defeated Jana Novotná and Arantxa Sánchez Vicario in the final, 6–3, 6–7^{(4–7)}, 6–3 to win the doubles tennis title at the 1994 Virginia Slims Championships.

== Seeds ==
1. (United States) Gigi Fernández / (Belarus) Natasha Zvereva (champions)
2. (Czech Republic) Jana Novotná / (Spain) Arantxa Sánchez Vicario (final)
3. (Netherlands) Manon Bollegraf / (United States) Martina Navratilova (semifinals)
4. (United States) Patty Fendick / (United States) Meredith McGrath (semifinals)

== Draw ==
=== Key ===
- Q = Qualifier
- WC = Wild card
- LL = Lucky loser
- Alt = Alternate
- SE = Special exempt
- PR = Protected ranking
- ITF = ITF entry
- JE = Junior exempt
- w/o = Walkover
- r = Retired
- d = Defaulted
- SR = Special ranking

=== Draw ===
Quarterfinals
1	(United States) Gigi Fernández (Belarus) Natasha Zvereva	6	6
(United States) Pam Shriver (Australia) Elizabeth Smylie	0	4
(France) Julie Halard (France) Nathalie Tauziat	4	1
4	(United States) Patty Fendick (United States) Meredith McGrath	6	6
3	(Netherlands) Manon Bollegraf (United States) Martina Navratilova	6	6
(Canada) Jill Hetherington (United States) Shaun Stafford	2	3
(United States) Lindsay Davenport (United States) Lisa Raymond	2	2
2	(Czech Republic) Jana Novotná (Spain) Arantxa Sánchez Vicario	6	6

Semifinals
1	(United States) Gigi Fernández (Belarus) Natasha Zvereva	4	7^{9}	6
4	(United States) Patty Fendick (United States) Meredith McGrath	6	6^{7}	2
3	(Netherlands) Manon Bollegraf (United States) Martina Navratilova	2	4
2	(Czech Republic) Jana Novotná (Spain) Arantxa Sánchez Vicario	6	6

Final
1	(United States) Gigi Fernández (Belarus) Natasha Zvereva	6	6^{4}	6
2	(Czech Republic) Jana Novotná (Spain) Arantxa Sánchez Vicario	3	7^{7}	3
