= Avon Futures of Puerto Rico =

Defunct tennis tournament held in San Juan, Puerto Rico

Defunct tennis tournament
- Event name: Borniquen Classic
- Tour: WTA Tour
- Founded: 1977
- Abolished: 1978
- Editions: 2
- Location: Isla Verde, San Juan, Puerto Rico
- Venue: Racquet Club Hotel
- Surface: Hard / outdoor

The Avon Futures of Puerto Rico is a defunct tennis tournament founded in 1977 as the Borniquen Tennis Classic. The tournament was part of the Avon Futures Circuit and was held in San Juan in Puerto Rico and was played on outdoor hard courts. It was the successor event to the early Caribe Hilton Invitational that was a combined men's and women's tournament. This event ran until 1978 when it was discontinued. In 1986 a successor women's event was established called the Puerto Rico Open, initially played in San Juan.

== Past finals ==
=== Singles ===
| Year | Champions | Runners-up | Score |
|---|---|---|---|
| 1977 | (United States) Billie Jean King | (United States) Janet Newberry | 6–1, 6–3 |
| 1978 | (United States) Julie Anthony | (United States) Mary Hamm | 6–7, 6–4, 7–6 |

=== Doubles ===
| Year | Champions | Runners-up | Score |
|---|---|---|---|
| 1977 | (United States) Rosemary Casals (United States) Billie Jean King | (South Africa) Delina Ann Boshoff (South Africa) Ilana Kloss | 4–6, 6–2, 6–3 |
| 1978 | (United States) Jane Stratton (Sweden) Mimi Wikstedt | (United States) Ann Kiyomura (United States) Valerie Ziegenfuss | 7–5, 2–6, 6–3 |

== See also ==
- Puerto Rico Open
