= Ann Grossman =

American tennis player

- Full name: Ann Grossman-Wunderlich
- Country (sports): United States
- Born: October 13, 1970 (age 55)
- Prize money: $1,138,377

Singles
- Career record: 223–201
- Career titles: 0
- Highest ranking: No. 29 (August 16, 1993)

Grand Slam singles results
- Australian Open: 3R (1994)
- French Open: 4R (1989, 1990)
- Wimbledon: 3R (1994)
- US Open: 4R (1994)

Doubles
- Career record: 88–155
- Career titles: 1 WTA
- Highest ranking: No. 31 (November 15, 1993)

Grand Slam doubles results
- Australian Open: QF (1994)
- French Open: 2R (1990, 1993, 1994)
- Wimbledon: 2R (1996)
- US Open: 2R (1990)

Team competitions
- Fed Cup: 2–0
Medal record
Pan American Games
Silver medal – second place	1995 Mar del Plata	Singles

Ann Grossman-Wunderlich (born October 13, 1970) is an American former professional tennis player.

Grossman was born in the United States. She competed on the WTA Tour from 1987 to 1998. She reached the fourth round of the French Open twice, and she reached the fourth round of the US Open once. She was ranked as high as 29 in singles, and 31 in doubles. She recorded wins over Martina Navratilova, Mary Jo Fernandez, and Zina Garrison.

Grossman has served on the USTA Olympic and Federation Cup committees after her retirement.

== WTA career finals ==
=== Singles: 7 runner-ups ===
Result	W/L	Date	Tournament	Surface	Opponent	Score
Loss	0–1	Aug 1988	San Diego Open, United States	Hard	(United States) Stephanie Rehe	1–6, 1–6
Loss	0–2	May 1990	Internationaux de Strasbourg, France	Clay	(Argentina) Mercedes Paz	2–6, 3–6
Loss	0–3	Sep 1992	Taipei Championship, Taiwan	Hard	(United States) Shaun Stafford	1–6, 3–6
Loss	0–4	Apr 1993	Malaysian Open	Hard	(Australia) Nicole Bradtke	3–6, 2–6
Loss	0–5	Apr 1993	Jakarta Open, Indonesia	Hard	(Indonesia) Yayuk Basuki	4–6, 4–6
Loss	0–6	Jul 1993	Puerto Rico Open	Hard	(United States) Linda Harvey-Wild	3–6, 7–5, 3–6
Loss	0–7	Aug 1994	LA Championships, U.S.	Hard	(United States) Amy Frazier	1–6, 3–6

=== Doubles: 3 (1 title, 2 runner-ups) ===
Result	W/L	Date	Tournament	Surface	Partner	Opponents	Score
Loss	0–1	Apr 1991	Taranto Trophy, Italy	Clay	(Italy) Laura Golarsa	(Argentina) Florencia Labat (France) Alexia Dechaume	2–6, 5–7
Loss	0–2	Mar 1993	Indian Wells Masters, U.S.	Hard	(Canada) Patricia Hy-Boulais	(Czech Republic) Helena Suková (Australia) Rennae Stubbs	3–6, 4–6
Win	1–2	Jul 1993	Puerto Rico Open	Hard	(United States) Debbie Graham	(United States) Gigi Fernández (Australia) Rennae Stubbs	5–7, 7–5, 7–5
