= Sonya Jeyaseelan =

Canadian tennis player

- Country (sports): Canada
- Residence: Toronto, Ontario
- Born: April 24, 1976 (age 49) New Westminster, British Columbia
- Height: 1.57 m (5 ft 2 in)
- Turned pro: 1991
- Retired: 2004
- Plays: Right-handed (two-handed backhand)
- Prize money: $730,722

Singles
- Career record: 205–212
- Career titles: 3 ITF
- Highest ranking: No. 48 (December 4, 2000)

Grand Slam singles results
- Australian Open: 3R (2000)
- French Open: 2R (1998, 2000)
- Wimbledon: 3R (2000)
- US Open: 2R (2000)

Other tournaments
- Olympic Games: 1R (2000)

Doubles
- Career record: 112–153
- Career titles: 2 WTA, 3 ITF
- Highest ranking: No. 40 (October 16, 2000)

Grand Slam doubles results
- Australian Open: 3R (2000)
- French Open: 2R (2001, 2003)
- Wimbledon: 2R (1998)
- US Open: QF (1996)

Other doubles tournaments
- Olympic Games: 1R (2000)

Grand Slam mixed doubles results
- French Open: 1R (1997, 1999, 2000)
- Wimbledon: 3R (1998)

Sonya Jeyaseelan (born April 24, 1976) is a Canadian former professional tennis player.

Her highest WTA singles ranking is No. 48, which she reached in December 2000. Her career-high ranking in doubles is world No. 40, achieved on 16 October 2000.

Playing for Canada in Fed Cup, Jeyaseelan has a win–loss record of 29–7.

Jeyaseelan is of Indian Tamil descent.

== WTA career finals ==
=== Singles: 1 (runner-up) ===
Legend Grand Slam (0–0) Tier I (0–0) Tier II (0–0) Tier III, IV & V (0–1)	Finals by surface Hard (0–0) Grass (0–0) Clay (0–1) Carpet (0–0)

Result	W–L	Date	Tournament	Tier	Surface	Opponent	Score
Loss	0–1	Feb 1998	Copa Colsanitas, Colombia	Tier IV	Clay	(Argentina) Paola Suárez	3–6, 4–6

=== Doubles: 3 (2 titles, 1 runner-up) ===
Legend Grand Slam (0–0) Tier I (0–0) Tier II (0–0) Tier III, IV & V (2–1)	Finals by surface Hard (0–0) Grass (0–0) Clay (2–1) Carpet (0–0)

Result	W–L	Date	Tournament	Tier	Surface	Partner	Opponents	Score
Loss	0–1	Jul 1999	Internazionali di Palermo, Italy	Tier IV	Clay	(Sweden) Åsa Carlsson	(Slovenia) Tina Križan (Slovenia) Katarina Srebotnik	6–4, 3–6, 0–6
Win	1–1	May 2000	Internationaux de Strasbourg, France	Tier III	Clay	(Argentina) Florencia Labat	(South Africa) Kim Grant (Venezuela) María Vento-Kabchi	6–4, 6–3
Win	2–1	May 2003	Internationaux de Strasbourg, France	Tier III	Clay	(Slovenia) Maja Matevžič	(United States) Laura Granville (Croatia) Jelena Kostanić	6–4, 6–4

== ITF Circuit finals ==
Legend
$50,000 tournaments
$25,000 tournaments
$10,000 tournaments

=== Singles: 5 (3–2) ===
Result	No.	Date	Tournament	Surface	Opponent	Score
Win	1.	12 September 1994	ITF Vancouver, Canada	Hard	(Chinese Taipei) Janet Lee	6–2, 6–4
Win	2.	22 October 1995	ITF Hallandale Beach, United States	Hard	(United States) Christine Neuman	6–2, 4–6, 6–4
Win	3.	9 March 1997	ITF Rockford, United States	Hard	(Australia) Siobhan Drake-Brockman	7–6, 6–3
Loss	4.	27 July 1997	ITF Peachtree City, United States	Hard	(Venezuela) María Vento-Kabchi	4–6, 0–6
Loss	5.	14 January 2003	ITF Boca Raton, United States	Hard	(Russia) Maria Kirilenko	3–6, 0–6

=== Doubles: 5 (3–2) ===
Result	No.	Date	Tournament	Surface	Partner	Opponents	Score
Win	1.	28 July 1996	ITF Fayetteville, United States	Hard	(Canada) Rene Simpson	(United States) Jane Chi (United States) Kelly Pace-Wilson	3–6, 6–4, 6–2
Win	2.	27 July 1997	ITF Peachtree City, United States	Hard	(Japan) Kaoru Shibata	(United Kingdom) Julie Pullin (United Kingdom) Amanda Wainwright	6–4, 6–1
Loss	3.	21 February 1999	ITF Midland, United States	Hard (i)	(Germany) Kirstin Freye	(South Africa) Liezel Horn (United Kingdom) Samantha Smith	6–7, 6–0, 5–7
Loss	4.	1 August 1999	ITF Salt Lake City, United States	Hard	(Australia) Annabel Ellwood	(Australia) Rachel McQuillan (Australia) Lisa McShea	3–6, 6–4, 3–6
Win	5.	14 January 2003	ITF Boca Raton, United States	Hard	(United States) Sandra Cacic	(United States) Shenay Perry (Russia) Lioudmila Skavronskaia	7–5, 6–2
