= Rene Simpson =

Canadian tennis player (1966–2013)

Rene Simpson Collins
- Full name: Norine Karen Simpson
- Country (sports): Canada
- Born: 14 January 1966 Sarnia, Ontario, Canada
- Died: 17 October 2013 (aged 47) Park Ridge, Illinois, United States
- Height: 1.65 m (5 ft 5 in)
- Turned pro: 1988
- Retired: 1998
- Plays: Left-handed (two-handed backhand)
- College: TCU Horned Frogs
- Prize money: US$ 485,389

Singles
- Career record: 161–133
- Career titles: 4 ITF
- Highest ranking: No. 70 (10 April 1989)

Grand Slam singles results
- Australian Open: 2R (1989, 1992, 1994)
- French Open: 3R (1989)
- Wimbledon: 1R (1989, 1992, 1994, 1997)
- US Open: 2R (1992, 1993)

Other tournaments
- Olympic Games: 1R (1992)

Doubles
- Career record: 99–119
- Career titles: 3 WTA, 3 ITF
- Highest ranking: No. 32 (21 August 1995)

Grand Slam doubles results
- Australian Open: 1R (1992, 1993, 1994, 1995, 1996, 1997, 1998)
- French Open: 3R (1997)
- Wimbledon: 2R (1998)
- US Open: QF (1996)

Other doubles tournaments
- Olympic Games: 2R (1992)

Grand Slam mixed doubles results
- Australian Open: 2R (1996)
- French Open: 1R (1995, 1996, 1997)
- Wimbledon: 1R (1995)
- US Open: 2R (1995)

Rene Simpson Collins (14 January 1966 – 17 October 2013) was a Canadian professional tennis player from Sarnia, Ontario. She reached a WTA singles ranking of 70 in 1989 and had a successful NCAA career for Texas Christian University.

She was a member of the Canada Fed Cup team from 1988 to 1998, coach from 1998 to 2000, and captain from 2001 to 2010.

She was inducted into the Canadian Tennis Hall of Fame in 2011.

Simpson died on 17 October 2013 after a year-long battle with brain cancer. She was 47.

== WTA career finals ==
=== Singles: 1 (1 runner-up) ===
Legend Grand Slam (0–0) Tier I (0–0) Tier II (0–0) Tier III, IV & V (0–1)	Finals by surface Hard (0–1) Grass (0–0) Clay (0–0) Carpet (0–0)

Result	W–L	Date	Tournament	Tier	Surface	Opponent	Score
Loss	0–1	Nov 1988	Brasil Open	Tier V	Hard	(Argentina) Mercedes Paz	5–7, 2–6

=== Doubles: 4 (3 titles, 1 runner-up) ===
Legend Grand Slam (0–0) Tier I (0–0) Tier II (0–1) Tier III, IV & V (3–0)	Finals by surface Hard (2–0) Grass (0–0) Clay (1–1) Carpet (0–0)

Result	W–L	Date	Tournament	Tier	Surface	Partner	Opponents	Score
Win	1–0	Nov 1994	Taiwan Open	Tier V	Hard	(Australia) Michelle Jaggard-Lai	(Belgium) Nancy Feber (France) Alexandra Fusai	6–0, 7–6^{(12–10)}
Win	2–0	Feb 1995	Puerto Rico Open	Tier III	Hard	(Germany) Karin Kschwendt	(Italy) Laura Golarsa (United States) Linda Wild	6–2, 0–6, 6–4
Loss	2–1	Apr 1995	VS of Houston, U.S.	Tier II	Clay	(Germany) Wiltrud Probst	(United States) Nicole Arendt (Netherlands) Manon Bollegraf	4–6, 2–6
Win	3–1	Apr 1995	Zagreb Open, Croatia	Tier III	Clay	(Argentina) Mercedes Paz	(Italy) Laura Golarsa (Romania) Irina Spîrlea	7–5, 6–2

== ITF finals ==
$25,000 tournaments
$10,000 tournaments

=== Singles (4–1) ===
Result	No.	Date	Tournament	Surface	Opponent	Score
Loss	1.	23 July 1989	Fayetteville, United States	Hard	(United States) Kimberly Po	6-4, 3-6, 0-6
Win	2.	21 January 1990	Waco, United States	Hard	(United States) Jeri Ingram	6-7, 6-4, 6-4
Win	3.	11 October 1992	Leawood, United States	Hard	(United States) Caroline Kuhlman	7-6, 1-6, 6-3
Win	4.	13 June 1993	Vancouver, Canada	Hard	(United States) Audra Keller	6-2, 4-6, 7-6
Win	5.	28 July 1996	Fayetteville, United States	Hard	(United States) Lilia Osterloh	6-4, 7-5

=== Doubles (3–2) ===
Result	No.	Date	Tournament	Surface	Partner	Opponents	Score
Loss	1.	21 January 1990	Waco, United States	Hard	(United States) Tory Plunkett	(United States) Lindsay Bartlett (United States) Shelly Bartlett	4–6, 3–6
Loss	2.	17 February 1991	Key Biscayne, United States	Hard	(Netherlands) Hellas ter Riet	(United States) Penny Barg (United Kingdom) Samantha Smith	5–7, 2–6
Win	3.	6 August 1995	Mississauga, Canada	Hard	(Canada) Caroline Delisle	(Germany) Kirstin Freye (Netherlands) Anique Snijders	6–3, 6–2
Win	4.	28 July 1996	Fayetteville, United States	Hard	(Canada) Sonya Jeyaseelan	(United States) Jane Chi (United States) Kelly Pace	3–6, 6–4, 6–2
Win	5.	6 October 1996	Newport Beach, United States	Hard	(Argentina) Mercedes Paz	(United States) Erika deLone (Australia) Nicole Pratt	6–3, 6–1
