= Rika Hiraki =

Japanese tennis player (born 1971)

Rika Hiraki 平木 理化
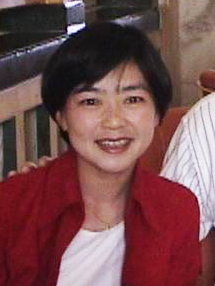
- Hiraki in 1999
- Country (sports): Japan
- Residence: Matsudo, Japan
- Born: 6 December 1971 (age 54) Beirut, Lebanon
- Height: 1.57 m (5 ft 2 in)
- Plays: Right-handed (two-handed both sides)
- Prize money: $852,103

Singles
- Career record: 208–252
- Career titles: 0
- Highest ranking: No. 72 (27 January 1997)

Grand Slam singles results
- Australian Open: 3R (1996, 1997, 1998)
- French Open: 1R (1991, 1992, 1993, 1996, 1997)
- Wimbledon: 3R (1992)
- US Open: 2R (1997)

Doubles
- Career record: 274–251
- Career titles: 6 WTA
- Highest ranking: No. 26 (27 October 1997)

Grand Slam doubles results
- Australian Open: 3R (2000)
- French Open: 2R (1996, 1997)
- Wimbledon: 2R (1996, 1999, 2000, 2001)
- US Open: 3R (1993, 1996)

Mixed doubles
- Career record: 11–13
- Career titles: 1

Grand Slam mixed doubles results
- Australian Open: 1R (1998)
- French Open: W (1997)
- Wimbledon: 3R (1997)
- US Open: 1R (1997, 1998)
Medal record
Representing Japan
Summer Universiade
Gold medal – first place	1991 Sheffield	Doubles
Gold medal – first place	1993 Buffalo	Mixed doubles
Gold medal – first place	1995 Fukuoka	Doubles
Silver medal – second place	1991 Sheffield	Singles
Silver medal – second place	1991 Sheffield	Mixed doubles
Silver medal – second place	1993 Buffalo	Doubles
Silver medal – second place	1995 Fukuoka	Singles
Asian Games
Bronze medal – third place	1998 Bangkok	Doubles
Bronze medal – third place	1998 Bangkok	Team

Rika Hiraki (Japanese: 平木 理化, born 6 December 1971) is a former professional Japanese tennis player.

She won the mixed-doubles title at the 1997 French Open (with Mahesh Bhupathi).

== Biography ==
Started playing at age 6. Baseliner, who considered groundstrokes her strength. Father, Koichi, works for Japan Airlines; mother, Noriko, is a homemaker; older brother, Yasuchika, graduated from the University of Tokyo and is now a pilot with Japan Airlines. Graduated from Aoyama Gakuin University, majoring in International Politics. Works as a Systems Manager for telephone company NTT, completing all her work from the road via computer modem while at tournaments. Hobbies include reading and working with computers. Likes to visit London. Favorite movie is Beaches; favorite color is red. Enjoys swimming and listening to music.

== Grand Slam finals ==
=== Mixed doubles: (1 title) ===
Result	Year	Championship	Surface	Partner	Opponents	Score
Win	1997	French Open	Clay	(India) Mahesh Bhupathi	(United States) Patrick Galbraith (United States) Lisa Raymond	6–4, 6–1

== WTA career finals ==
=== Doubles (6–7) ===
Result	W/L	Date	Tournament	Surface	Partner	Opponents	Score
Loss	0–1	Apr 1991	Pattaya, Thailand	Hard	(Japan) Akemi Nishiya	(Japan) Nana Miyagi (Indonesia) Suzanna Wibowo	1–6, 4–6
Win	1–1	Oct 1991	San Juan, Puerto Rico	Hard	(Argentina) Florencia Labat	(Belgium) Sabine Appelmans (United States) Camille Benjamin	6–3, 6–3
Win	2–1	Apr 1992	Tokyo, Japan	Hard	(United States) Amy Frazier	(Japan) Kimiko Date (United States) Stephanie Rehe	7–5, 6–7, 6–0
Loss	2–2	Apr 1992	Kuala Lumpur, Malaysia	Hard (i)	(Czech Republic) Petra Langrová	(France) Isabelle Demongeot (Ukraine) Natalia Medvedeva	6–2, 4–6, 1–6
Loss	2–3	Sep 1994	Tokyo, Japan	Hard (i)	(United States) Amy Frazier	(Spain) Arantxa Sánchez Vicario (France) Julie Halard-Decugis	1–6, 6–0, 1–6
Loss	2–4	Sep 1995	Nagoya, Japan	Carpet (i)	(South Korea) Park Sung-hee	(Australia) Kerry-Anne Guse (Australia) Kristine Kunce	4–6, 4–6
Win	3–4	Apr 1996	Jakarta, Indonesia	Hard	(Japan) Naoko Kijimuta	(Belgium) Laurence Courtois (Belgium) Nancy Feber	7–6, 7–5
Win	4–4	Feb 1997	Oklahoma City, US	Hard (i)	(Japan) Nana Miyagi	(United States) Marianne Werdel-Witmeyer (United States) Tami Whitlinger-Jones	6–4, 6–1
Win	5–4	Apr 1997	Tokyo, Japan	Hard	(France) Alexia Dechaume-Balleret	(Australia) Kerry-Anne Guse (United States) Corina Morariu	6–4, 6–2
Win	6–4	Sep 1997	Surabaya, Indonesia	Hard	(Australia) Kerry-Anne Guse	(Canada) Maureen Drake (Canada) Renata Kolbovic	6–1, 7–6
Loss	6–5	Apr 1998	Tokyo, Japan	Hard	(United States) Amy Frazier	(Japan) Naoko Kijimuta (Japan) Nana Smith	3–6, 6–4, 4–6
Loss	6–6	Nov 1998	Pattaya City, Thailand	Hard	(Poland) Aleksandra Olsza	(France) Julie Halard (Belgium) Els Callens	6–3, 2–6, 2–6
Loss	6–7	Nov 1999	Kuala Lumpur, Malaysia	Clay	(Japan) Yuka Yoshida	(Croatia) Jelena Kostanić (Slovenia) Tina Pisnik	6–3, 2–6, 4–6

== ITF finals ==
=== Singles (1–3) ===
Legend
$100,000 tournaments
$75,000 tournaments
$50,000 tournaments
$25,000 tournaments
$10,000 tournaments

Result	No.	Date	Tournament	Surface	Opponent	Score
Loss	1.	11 October 1987	Kofu, Japan	Hard	(Japan) Emiko Okagawa	2-6, 6-2, 1-6
Loss	2.	1 October 1989	Kofu, Japan	Hard	(Japan) Maya Kidowaki	5-7, 0-6
Win	3.	14 October 1990	Matsuyama, Japan	Hard	(Australia) Catherine Barclay	6-4, 6-2
Loss	4.	21 October 1990	Kyoto, Japan	Hard	(Australia) Kristine Kunce	7-6, 3-6, 3-6

=== Doubles (10–13) ===
Result	No.	Date	Tournament	Surface	Partner	Opponents	Score
Win	1.	20 November 1989	Bulleen, Australia	Hard	(New Zealand) Claudine Toleafoa	(Netherlands) Ingelise Driehuis (United States) Alysia May	7–6, 6–4
Loss	2.	7 October 1990	Tokyo, Japan	Hard	(Japan) Yasuyo Kajita	(Australia) Kerry-Anne Guse (Australia) Kristine Kunce	6-4, 1-6, 5-7
Loss	3.	21 October 1990	Kyoto, Japan	Hard	(Japan) Yasuyo Kajita	(Australia) Kerry-Anne Guse (Australia) Kristine Kunce	3-6, 4-6
Loss	4.	30 March 1998	Phoenix, United States	Hard	(United States) Amy Frazier	(Poland) Aleksandra Olsza (Sweden) Kristina Triska	4–6, 6–7^{(5)}
Win	5.	19 July 1998	Mahwah, United States	Hard	(United States) Amy Frazier	(United States) Jane Chi (United States) Jean Okada	4-6, 6-4, 6-4
Runner-up	6.	25 October 1998	Houston, United States	Hard	(South Korea) Kim Eun-ha	(United States) Nana Smith (Japan) Miho Saeki	1–6, 6–4, 1–6
Runner-up	7.	4 April 1999	Claremont, United States	Hard	(South Africa) Nannie de Villiers	(Australia) Rachel McQuillan (Japan) Nana Smith	2–6, 3–6
Runner-up	8.	18 April 1999	Las Vegas, United States	Hard	(Australia) Lisa McShea	(United States) Erika deLone (Australia) Annabel Ellwood	6–7, 2–6
Runner-up	9.	6 June 1999	Surbiton, United Kingdom	Grass	(United States) Linda Wild	(United Kingdom) Julie Pullin (United Kingdom) Lorna Woodroffe	W/O
Win	10.	25 July 1999	Peachtree City, United States	Hard	(Japan) Nana Smith	(Australia) Annabel Ellwood (Australia) Bryanne Stewart	6-4, 6-1
Runner-up	11.	24 October 1999	Gold Coast, Australia	Hard	(Australia) Trudi Musgrave	(Australia) Kerry-Anne Guse (Australia) Lisa McShea	2–6, 3–6
Win	12.	13 December 1999	New Delhi, India	Hard	(United Kingdom) Lorna Woodroffe	(Italy) Tathiana Garbin (India) Nirupama Sanjeev	5–2 ret.
Win	13.	20 February 2000	Midland, United States	Hard (i)	(South Africa) Nannie de Villiers	(South Africa) Surina De Beer (Israel) Tzipora Obziler	6–1, 1–6, 6–1
Win	14.	3 April 2000	West Palm Beach, United States	Clay	(Japan) Yuka Yoshida	(United States) Erika deLone (Australia) Nicole Pratt	1–6, 6–0, 7–6^{(5)}
Loss	15.	25 March 2001	La Cañada, United States	Hard	(South Korea) Kim Eun-ha	(United Kingdom) Julie Pullin (United Kingdom) Lorna Woodroffe	2–6, 4–6
Loss	16.	8 April 2001	West Palm Beach, United States	Clay	(Japan) Nana Smith	(Australia) Rachel McQuillan (Australia) Lisa McShea	3–6, 3–6
Win	17.	13 May 2001	Fukuoka, Japan	Hard	(Japan) Nana Smith	(United Kingdom) Julie Pullin (United Kingdom) Lorna Woodroffe	6–0, 7–6^{(3)}
Loss	18.	16 September 2001	Seoul, South Korea	Hard	(South Korea) Kim Eun-ha	(South Korea) Choi Young-ja (South Korea) Kim Eun-sook	3–6, 3–6
Win	19.	14 October 2001	Saga, Japan	Grass	(Japan) Nana Smith	(Japan) Shiho Hisamatsu (Japan) Maiko Inoue	6-0, 6-1
Win	20.	28 October 2001	Dallas, United States	Hard	(Japan) Nana Smith	(Kazakhstan) Irina Selyutina (South Africa) Nannie de Villiers	7–6^{(4)}, 6–2
Loss	21.	12 November 2001	Hattiesburg, United States	Hard	(Japan) Nana Smith	(Russia) Alina Jidkova (United States) Abigail Spears	3-6, 1-6
Loss	22.	26 November 2002	Minneapolis, United States	Hard (i)	(Japan) Nana Smith	(Japan) Shinobu Asagoe (Belgium) Els Callens	6–7^{(3)}, 6–7^{(3)}
Win	23.	14 April 2002	Naples, United States	Clay	(Japan) Nana Smith	(Argentina) Gisela Dulko (Russia) Vera Zvonareva	7–5, 4–6, 7–5
