= Emilie Viqueira =

Puerto Rican tennis player

- Country (sports): Puerto Rico
- Born: March 21, 1969 (age 57) Mayagüez, Puerto Rico
- Prize money: $19,215

Singles
- Highest ranking: No. 445 (August 10, 1992)

Doubles
- Career titles: 6 ITF
- Highest ranking: No. 187 (July 10, 1995)

Emilie Viqueira (born March 21, 1969) is a Puerto Rican former professional tennis player.

== Biography ==
Viqueira, who comes from Mayagüez, began competing on the professional tour in the late 1980s. She featured mostly on the ITF circuit, winning six doubles titles. All of her WTA Tour main-draw appearances came at her home tournament, the Puerto Rico Open.

During her career, she played college tennis for UC Berkeley, where she earned All-American honors in 1990 and 1991.

At the representative level, Viqueira was a mixed-doubles bronze medalist at the 1991 Pan American Games in Havana and represented the Puerto Rico Fed Cup team in 16 ties from 1992 to 1997.

She is married to Puerto Rican musician Roy Brown.

== ITF finals ==
=== Doubles (6–4) ===
Outcome	No.	Date	Tournament	Surface	Partner	Opponents	Score
Winner	1.	7 July 1991	Fayetteville, United States	Hard	(United States) Kay Louthian	(United States) Danielle Scott (United States) Susan Sommerville	6–4, 6–3
Runner-up	1.	14 July 1991	Indianapolis, United States	Hard	(United States) Janna Kovacevich	(United States) Andrea Farley (United States) Caroline Kuhlman	1–6, 3–6
Runner-up	2.	3 November 1991	Kingston, Jamaica	Hard	(Philippines) Jean Lozano	(Canada) Jillian Alexander (Netherlands) Claire Wegink	3–6, 1–6
Runner-up	3.	28 June 1992	Greensboro, United States	Hard	(United States) Kay Louthian	(United States) Stephanie Reece (Canada) Mandy Wilson	2–6, 3–6
Winner	2.	2 August 1992	Williamsburg, United States	Hard	(United States) Vickie Paynter	(United States) Claire Sessions Bailey (United States) Danielle Scott	3–6, 6–4, 6–4
Runner-up	4.	15 November 1992	Freeport, Bahamas	Hard	(Netherlands) Caroline Stassen	(United States) Lisa Albano (Philippines) Jean Lozano	4–6, 4–6
Winner	3.	9 May 1994	Acapulco, Mexico	Clay	(Chile) Paula Cabezas	(South Africa) Kim Grant (United States) Ditta Huber	3–6, 6–2, 6–1
Winner	4.	17 July 1994	Vigo, Spain	Clay	(Chile) Paula Cabezas	(Czech Republic) Jitka Dubcová (Austria) Sylvia Plischke	6–4, 6–3
Winner	5.	19 September 1994	Guayaquil, Ecuador	Clay	(Chile) Paula Cabezas	(Brazil) Vanessa Menga (Brazil) Luciana Tella	6–4, 6–4
Winner	6.	20 November 1994	San Salvador, El Salvador	Hard	(Chile) Bárbara Castro	(United States) Kellie Dorman-Tyrone (Republic of Ireland) Philippa Palmer	6–2, 6–2
