= Camille Benjamin =

American tennis player

- Full name: Camille Benjamin-Schermerhorn
- Country (sports): United States
- Born: February 6, 1966 (age 59) Cleveland, Ohio
- Plays: Left-handed (two-handed backhand)
- Prize money: $688,139

Singles
- Career record: 262–298
- Career titles: 0
- Highest ranking: No. 27 (October 15, 1984)

Grand Slam singles results
- Australian Open: 3R (1987, 1989)
- French Open: SF (1984)
- Wimbledon: 3R (1983, 1984)
- US Open: 3R (1985, 1986, 1989)

Doubles
- Career record: 147–246
- Career titles: 1
- Highest ranking: No. 72 (February 27, 1989)

Grand Slam doubles results
- Australian Open: QF (1988)
- French Open: QF (1984)
- Wimbledon: 3R (1984)
- US Open: 3R (1991)

Camille Benjamin (born June 22, 1966) is an American former professional tennis player.

Benjamin played on the WTA tour from 1981 to 1994. She reached the semifinals of the French Open in 1984, defeating Cláudia Monteiro, Jamie Golder, Catrin Jexell, Sabrina Goleš and Lisa Bonder before losing to Chris Evert.

Benjamin is the daughter of Panamanian immigrants. Her father, Carl Benjamin, was a math professor at Bakersfield College and had played college tennis at Central State College in Xenia, Ohio.

== WTA Tour finals ==
=== Singles 2 ===
Legend
Grand Slam	0
WTA Championships	0
Tier I	0
Tier II	0
Tier III	0
Tier IV & V	0

Result	W/L	Date	Tournament	Surface	Opponent	Score
Loss	0–1	Sep 1985	Salt Lake City, Utah, US	Hard	(United States) Stephanie Rehe	2–6, 4–6
Loss	0–2	Oct 1987	San Juan, Puerto Rico, US	Hard	(United States) Stephanie Rehe	5–7, 6–7

=== Doubles 3 (1–2) ===
Legend
Grand Slam	0
WTA Championships	0
Tier I	0
Tier II	0
Tier III	0
Tier IV & V	0

Titles by surface
Hard	1
Clay	0
Grass	0
Carpet	0

Result	W/L	Date	Tournament	Surface	Partner	Opponents	Score
Loss	0–1	Feb 1985	Marco Island, Florida, US	Hard	(United States) Bonnie Gadusek	(United States) Kathy Jordan (Australia) Elizabeth Smylie	2–6, 6–1, 0–6
Win	1–1	Sep 1986	Tulsa, Oklahoma, US	Hard	(South Africa) Dianne Van Rensburg	(Soviet Union) Svetlana Cherneva (Soviet Union) Larisa Savchenko	7–6, 7–5
Loss	1–2	Oct 1991	San Juan, Puerto Rico, US	Hard	(Belgium) Sabine Appelmans	(Japan) Rika Hiraki (Argentina) Florencia Labat	3–6, 3–6

== ITF titles ==
=== Singles (1) ===
No.	Date	Location	Surface	Opponent	Score
1.	July 20, 1987	Schenectady, NY, US	Hard	(United States) Vicki Nelson-Dunbar	6–2, 6–3
