= Gigi Fernández =

American professional tennis player

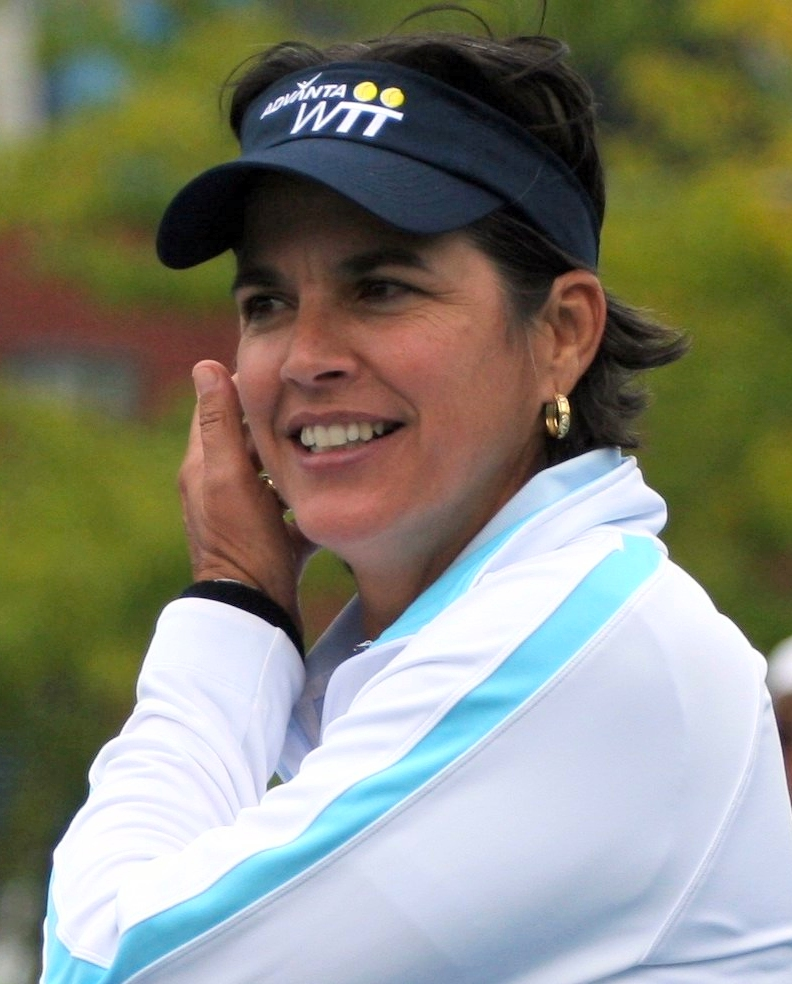
- Country (sports): United States
- Residence: Connecticut, US
- Born: February 22, 1964 (age 62) San Juan, Puerto Rico
- Height: 1.70 m (5 ft 7 in)
- Turned pro: Nov. 1983
- Retired: Nov. 1997
- Plays: Right-handed (one handed-backhand)
- Prize money: $4,681,906
- Int. Tennis HoF: 2010 (member page)

Singles
- Career record: 270–232
- Career titles: 2
- Highest ranking: No. 17 (October 6, 1991)

Grand Slam singles results
- Australian Open: 4R (1990, 1993)
- French Open: 2R (1986, 1987, 1991)
- Wimbledon: SF (1994)
- US Open: QF (1991, 1994)

Other tournaments
- Olympic Games: 1R (1984)

Doubles
- Career record: 664–184
- Career titles: 69
- Highest ranking: No. 1 (March 4, 1991)

Grand Slam doubles results
- Australian Open: W (1993, 1994)
- French Open: W (1991, 1992, 1993, 1994, 1995, 1997)
- Wimbledon: W (1992, 1993, 1994, 1997)
- US Open: W (1988, 1990, 1992, 1995, 1996)

Other doubles tournaments
- Tour Finals: W (1993, 1994)
- Olympic Games: Gold Medal (1992, 1996)

Grand Slam mixed doubles results
- Australian Open: F (1995)
- Wimbledon: F (1995)
- US Open: F (1995)
Medal record
Women's tennis
Representing the United States
Olympic Games
| Gold medal – first place | 1992 Barcelona | Women's doubles |
| Gold medal – first place | 1996 Atlanta | Women's doubles |
Representing Puerto Rico
Pan American Games
| Silver medal – second place | 1983 Caracas | Singles |
| Silver medal – second place | 1983 Caracas | Women's doubles |
| Bronze medal – third place | 1979 San Juan | Women's doubles |

Beatriz "Gigi" Fernández (born February 22, 1964) is a Puerto Rican former professional tennis player. Fernández won 17 major doubles titles and two Olympic gold medals representing the United States, and reached the world No. 1 ranking in doubles. She reached a career-high singles ranking of world No. 17 in 1991. Since retiring from the professional tour in 1997 at the age of 33, Fernández has been a tennis coach, entrepreneur and philanthropist. She combines her two passions, tennis and travel and offers unique tennis experiences to tennis aficionados. Her doubles program, The Gigi Method, teaches players of all levels the art and science of doubles. She founded Tennis for Hope after her house flooded during Hurricane Helene to help people in the tennis community affected by Natural Disasters. Fernández is the first Puerto Rican to be inducted into the International Tennis Hall of Fame.

== Career ==
Fernández was recognized primarily as a doubles specialist during her professional career. She won a career doubles Grand Slam with 17 Grand Slam women's doubles title – six French Open, five US Open, four Wimbledon, and two Australian Open winning at least one Grand Slam title every year from 1988 to 1997, except 1989, and for three straight years winning three of the four Grand Slam doubles titles in the same year (1992–1994). She won 14 of her 17 Grand Slam titles and three Career Grand Slams partnering Natasha Zvereva; their partnership is the second most successful doubles pair in the Open era after Martina Navratilova and Pam Shriver.

In mixed doubles, Fernández was the runner-up in three of the four Grand Slam mixed doubles events in 1995 (Australian Open, Wimbledon, and US Open) partnering Cyril Suk. Fernández captured 69 career titles in doubles and reached the world No. 1 doubles ranking in 1991 and attained the No. 1 ranking again in 1993, 1994 and 1995.

Fernández represented the United States at the Olympic Games in 1992 (Barcelona) and 1996 (Atlanta). She teamed with Mary Joe Fernández (no relation) to win the women's doubles gold medal on both occasions. The first gold medal was won against the home team of Conchita Martínez and Arantxa Sánchez Vicario with the king and queen of Spain in the audience.

Fernández represented Puerto Rico when San Juan played host to the Pan Am Games in 1979. Just 15, Fernández won a bronze medal. In 1982 at the Central American-Caribbean Games in Cuba, she teamed with Marilda Julia to win doubles gold and won a silver medal in the singles as well. She represented Puerto Rico at the 1984 Olympics.

Fernández was also on the United States team that won the Federation Cup in 1990.

In singles, Fernández reached as high as world No. 17. She also won two top-level titles and reached the semifinals at Wimbledon in 1994 (ranked 99 becoming the lowest-ranked Grand Slam singles semifinalist at Wimbledon) and the quarterfinals at the US Open in 1991 and 1994.

Fernández retired from the professional tour in 1997, and in 1999, she was named Puerto Rico's "Female Athlete of the Century".

On July 12, 2010, Fernández was inducted in the International Tennis Hall of Fame with Zvereva.

== Personal life ==
Her parents are Tuto Fernández, a well-known doctor in Puerto Rico, and Beatriz Fernández. Her cousin José Ferrer was Puerto Rican actor, Oscar Winner and director. Fernández started playing tennis when she was seven. She studied at the prestigious Academia San José in Guaynabo. When she turned professional in 1983, she became Puerto Rico's first female professional athlete. Before turning professional, she played tennis for one season at Clemson University in 1982–83, where she was singles and doubles All-American and reached the National Collegiate Athletic Association singles final.

Since retiring from the tour, Fernández has worked as a tennis coach. She has coached players including the former world No. 1 doubles player Rennae Stubbs, Lisa Raymond, and Samantha Stosur. She coached Sam Stosur to her first Grand Slam title at the 2005 US Open with Lisa Raymond. She also coached for the Puerto Rican national team and the University of South Florida.

She earned a Bachelor of Arts in psychology from the University of South Florida in 2003 and later graduated from Rollins College's Crummer School of Business where she earned a Master of Business Administration.

She presently resides in Tampa, Florida, is the mother of twins, Karson Xavier and Madison Jane, and the partner of retired professional golfer and former LPGA and WWE executive Jane Geddes.

Gigi is currently the Vice Chairman of the Board of the International Tennis Hall of Fame, where she has been serving as a board member since 2018.

In January 2025, after her house flooded during Hurricane Helene, she started a not-for-profit foundation called Tennis for Hope. The Foundation helps people in the tennis community affected by natural disasters. It is a member-based organization with over 50 members pledging $500,000 in the year since her house flooded.

== Doubles performance timeline ==
Key
| W | F | SF | QF | #R | RR | Q# | P# | DNQ | A | Z# | PO | G | S | B | NMS | NTI | P | NH |

(W) winner; (F) finalist; (SF) semifinalist; (QF) quarterfinalist; (#R) rounds 4, 3, 2, 1; (RR) round-robin stage; (Q#) qualification round; (P#) preliminary round; (DNQ) did not qualify; (A) absent; (Z#) Davis/Fed Cup Zonal Group (with number indication) or (PO) play-off; (G) gold, (S) silver or (B) bronze Olympic/Paralympic medal; (NMS) not a Masters tournament; (NTI) not a Tier I tournament; (P) postponed; (NH) not held; (SR) strike rate (events won / competed); (W–L) win–loss record.

| Tournament | 1983 | 1984 | 1985 | 1986 | 1987 | 1988 | 1989 | 1990 | 1991 | 1992 | 1993 | 1994 | 1995 | 1996 | 1997 | SR | W–L |
|---|---|---|---|---|---|---|---|---|---|---|---|---|---|---|---|---|---|
Grand Slam tournaments
| Australian Open | 1R | 1R | 2R | NH | 2R | A | A | SF | F | QF | W | W | F | QF | SF | 2 / 12 | 38–10 |
| French Open | A | A | A | A | QF | A | 2R | A | W | W | W | W | W | F | W | 6 / 9 | 45–3 |
| Wimbledon | A | 3R | A | 3R | 3R | QF | QF | QF | F | W | W | W | F | SF | W | 4 / 13 | 53–9 |
| US Open | A | 2R | QF | QF | 3R | W | QF | W | 3R | W | SF | SF | W | W | F | 5 / 14 | 57–9 |
| Win–loss | 0–1 | 3–3 | 4–2 | 5–2 | 8–4 | 9–1 | 7–3 | 13–2 | 18–3 | 21–1 | 22–1 | 22–1 | 22–2 | 18–3 | 21–2 | 17 / 48 | 193–31 |
National representation
| Summer Olympics | NH | A | Not Held | | | A | Not Held | | | G | Not Held | | | G | NH | 2 / 2 | 9–0 |
Year-end championships
| WTA Finals | A | A | A | QF | A | QF | QF | A | F | SF | W | W | F | SF | QF | 2 / 10 | 13–8 |
WTA 1000 tournaments + former
| Indian Wells Open | Not Held | | | | | | C 4 | Tier II | | | | | | A | SF | 0 / 1 | 2–1 |
| Miami Open | NH | No Levels | | | | F | F | A | F | 2R | QF | W | F | A | A | 1 / 7 | 25–6 |
| Italian Open | No Levels | | | | | C 3 | A | A | A | A | QF | W | W | F | QF | 2 / 5 | 15–3 |
| Canadian Open | No Levels | | | | | A | W | A | A | F | A | A | A | A | A | 1 / 2 | 7–1 |
| Pan Pacific Open | NH | No Levels | | | | Category 4 | | Tier II | | | SF | A | W | W | F | 2 / 4 | 13–2 |
| Florida Slims | NH | No Levels | | | | A | QF | T II | QF | A | Tier II | | | Not Held | | 0 / 2 | 3–2 |
| Charleston Open | No Levels | | | | | A | A | A | QF | QF | W | F | F | F | SF | 1 / 7 | 18–6 |
| Berlin Open | No Levels | | | | | A | A | A | SF | F | W | W | QF | A | F | 2 / 6 | 17–4 |
| Zurich Open | NH | No Levels | | | | C 3 | C 4 | Tier II | | | F | A | A | A | A | 0 / 1 | 3–1 |
| Philadelphia Championships | Not Held | | | | | | | | Tier II | | SF | W | QF | Tier II | | 1 / 3 | 7–2 |
Career statistics
| Year-end ranking | —N/a | —N/a | —N/a | 17 | 20 | 6 | 8 | 3 | 4 | 6 | 1 | 2 | 3 | 4 | 4 | | |

== Grand Slam tournament finals ==
=== Doubles: 23 (17 titles, 6 runner-ups) ===
| Result | Year | Championship | Partner | Opponents | Score |
|---|---|---|---|---|---|
| Win | 1988 | US Open (1) | (United States) Robin White | (United States) Patty Fendick (Canada) Jill Hetherington | 6–4, 6–1 |
| Win | 1990 | US Open (2) | (United States) Martina Navratilova | (Czech Republic) Jana Novotná (Czech Republic) Helena Suková | 6–2, 6–4 |
| Loss | 1991 | Australian Open | (Czechoslovakia) Jana Novotná | (United States) Patty Fendick (United States) Mary Joe Fernández | 6–7^{(4–7)}, 1–6 |
| Win | 1991 | French Open (1) | (Czech Republic) Jana Novotná | (Latvia) Larisa Savchenko Neiland (Belarus) Natasha Zvereva | 6–4, 6–0 |
| Loss | 1991 | Wimbledon | (Czechoslovakia) Jana Novotná | (Latvia) Larisa Savchenko Neiland (Belarus) Natasha Zvereva | 4–6, 6–3, 4–6 |
| Win | 1992 | French Open (2) | (Commonwealth of Independent States) Natasha Zvereva | (Spain) Conchita Martínez (Spain) Arantxa Sánchez Vicario | 6–3, 6–2 |
| Win | 1992 | Wimbledon (1) | (Commonwealth of Independent States) Natasha Zvereva | (Latvia) Larisa Savchenko Neiland (Czechoslovakia) Jana Novotná | 6–4, 6–1 |
| Win | 1992 | US Open (3) | (Commonwealth of Independent States) Natasha Zvereva | (Latvia) Larisa Savchenko Neiland (Czechoslovakia) Jana Novotná | 7–6^{(7–4)}, 6–1 |
| Win | 1993 | Australian Open (1) | (Belarus) Natasha Zvereva | (United States) Pam Shriver (Australia) Elizabeth Smylie | 6–4, 6–3 |
| Win | 1993 | French Open (3) | (Belarus) Natasha Zvereva | (Czech Republic) Jana Novotná (Latvia) Larisa Savchenko Neiland | 6–3, 7–5 |
| Win | 1993 | Wimbledon (2) | (Belarus) Natasha Zvereva | (Latvia) Larisa Savchenko Neiland (Czechoslovakia) Jana Novotná | 6–4, 6–7^{(9–11)}, 6–4 |
| Win | 1994 | Australian Open (2) | (Belarus) Natasha Zvereva | (United States) Patty Fendick (Australia) Meredith McGrath | 6–3, 4–6, 6–4 |
| Win | 1994 | French Open (4) | (Belarus) Natasha Zvereva | (United States) Lindsay Davenport (United States) Lisa Raymond | 6–2, 6–2 |
| Win | 1994 | Wimbledon (3) | (Belarus) Natasha Zvereva | (Czechoslovakia) Jana Novotná (Spain) Arantxa Sánchez Vicario | 6–4, 6–1 |
| Loss | 1995 | Australian Open | (Belarus) Natasha Zvereva | (Czech Republic) Jana Novotná (Spain) Arantxa Sánchez Vicario | 3–6, 7–6^{(7–3)}, 4–6 |
| Win | 1995 | French Open (5) | (Belarus) Natasha Zvereva | (Czech Republic) Jana Novotná (Spain) Arantxa Sánchez Vicario | 6–7^{(6–8)}, 6–4, 7–5 |
| Loss | 1995 | Wimbledon | (Belarus) Natasha Zvereva | (Czechoslovakia) Jana Novotná (Spain) Arantxa Sánchez Vicario | 7–5, 5–7, 4–6 |
| Win | 1995 | US Open (4) | (Belarus) Natasha Zvereva | (Netherlands) Brenda Schultz-McCarthy (Australia) Rennae Stubbs | 7–5, 6–3 |
| Loss | 1996 | French Open | (Belarus) Natasha Zvereva | (United States) Lindsay Davenport (United States) Mary Joe Fernández | 2–6, 1–6 |
| Win | 1996 | US Open (5) | (Belarus) Natasha Zvereva | (Czech Republic) Jana Novotná (Spain) Arantxa Sánchez Vicario | 1–6, 6–1, 6–4 |
| Win | 1997 | French Open (6) | (Belarus) Natasha Zvereva | (United States) Mary Joe Fernández (United States) Lisa Raymond | 6–2, 6–3 |
| Win | 1997 | Wimbledon (4) | (Belarus) Natasha Zvereva | (United States) Nicole Arendt (Netherlands) Manon Bollegraf | 7–6^{(7–4)}, 6–4 |
| Loss | 1997 | US Open | (Belarus) Natasha Zvereva | (United States) Lindsay Davenport (Czech Republic) Jana Novotná | 3–6, 4–6 |

=== Mixed doubles: 3 runner-ups ===
| Result | Year | Championship | Partner | Opponents | Score |
|---|---|---|---|---|---|
| Loss | 1995 | Australian Open | (Czech Republic) Cyril Suk | (Belarus) Natasha Zvereva (United States) Rick Leach | 6–7^{(4–7)}, 7–6^{(7–3)}, 4–6 |
| Loss | 1995 | Wimbledon | (Czech Republic) Cyril Suk | (United States) Martina Navratilova (United States) Jonathan Stark | 4–6, 4–6 |
| Loss | 1995 | US Open | (Czech Republic) Cyril Suk | (Australia) Meredith McGrath (United States) Matt Lucena | 4–6, 4–6 |

== Other significant finals ==
=== Summer Olympics ===
==== Doubles: 2 (2 gold medals) ====
| Result | Year | Tournament | Partner | Opponents | Score |
|---|---|---|---|---|---|
| Gold | 1992 | Barcelona Olympics, Spain | (United States) Mary Joe Fernández | (Spain) Conchita Martínez (Spain) Arantxa Sánchez | 7–5, 2–6, 6–2 |
| Gold | 1996 | Atlanta Olympics, United States | (United States) Mary Joe Fernández | (Czech Republic) Jana Novotná (Czech Republic) Helena Suková | 7–6^{(8–6)}, 6–4 |

== WTA Tour finals ==
=== Singles: 5 (2 titles, 3 runner-ups) ===
| Result | W–L | Date | Tournament | Tier | Surface | Opponent | Score |
|---|---|---|---|---|---|---|---|
| Loss | 0–1 | Jul 1984 | Newport, US | Regular | Grass | (United States) Martina Navratilova | 3–6, 6–7^{(3–7)} |
| Win | 1–1 | Oct 1986 | Singapore, Singapore | Tier V | Hard (i) | (Argentina) Mercedes Paz | 6–4, 2–6, 6–4 |
| Loss | 1–2 | Oct 1989 | San Juan, Puerto Rico | Tier IV | Hard | (Peru) Laura Gildemeister | 1–6, 2–6 |
| Win | 2–2 | Apr 1991 | Albuquerque, US | Tier IV | Hard | (France) Julie Halard | 6–0, 6–2 |
| Loss | 2–3 | Oct 1992 | San Juan, Puerto Rico | Tier IV | Hard | (France) Mary Pierce | 1–6, 5–7 |

=== Doubles: 118 (69 titles, 49 runner-ups) ===
| Result | W–L | Date | Tournament | Tier | Surface | Partner | Opponents | Score |
|---|---|---|---|---|---|---|---|---|
| Loss | 0–1 | Aug 1983 | Indianapolis, US | Category 4 | Clay | (United States) Beth Herr | (United States) Kathleen Horvath (Romania) Virginia Ruzici | 5–7, 4–6 |
| Win | 1–1 | Jan 1985 | Washington, D.C., US | Regular | Carpet (i) | (United States) Martina Navratilova | (West Germany) Claudia Kohde-Kilsch (Czechoslovakia) Helena Suková | 6–3, 3–6, 6–3 |
| Win | 2–1 | Feb 1985 | Delray Beach, US | Regular | Hard | (United States) Martina Navratilova | (United States) Kathy Jordan (Czechoslovakia) Hana Mandlíková | 7–6^{(7–4)}, 6–2 |
| Win | 3–1 | Aug 1985 | Toronto, Canada | Regular | Hard | (United States) Martina Navratilova | (Netherlands) Marcella Mesker (France) Pascale Paradis | 6–4, 6–0 |
| Win | 4–1 | Oct 1985 | Fort Lauderdale, US | Regular | Hard | (United States) Robin White | (South Africa) Rosalyn Fairbank (South Africa) Beverly Mould | 6–2, 7–5 |
| Loss | 4–2 | May 1986 | Indianapolis, US | Regular | Clay | (United States) Robin White | (West Germany) Steffi Graf (Argentina) Gabriela Sabatini | 2–6, 0–6 |
| Loss | 4–3 | Sep 1986 | Largo, US | Regular | Clay | (United States) Kim Sands | (United States) Elise Burgin (South Africa) Rosalyn Fairbank | 5–7, 2–6 |
| Loss | 4–4 | Oct 1986 | Taipei, Taiwan | Regular | Carpet (i) | (Australia) Susan Leo | (United States) Lea Antonoplis (United States) Barbara Gerken | 1–6, 2–6 |
| Loss | 4–5 | Nov 1986 | Puerto Rico, US | Regular | Hard | (United States) Robin White | (United States) Lori McNeil (Argentina) Mercedes Paz | 2–6, 6–3, 4–6 |
| Win | 5–5 | Mar 1987 | Piscataway, US | Category 3 | Carpet (i) | (United States) Lori McNeil | (United States) Betsy Nagelsen (Australia) Elizabeth Smylie | 6–1, 6–4 |
| Win | 6–5 | Jul 1987 | Newport, US | Category 3 | Grass | (United States) Lori McNeil | (United Kingdom) Anne Hobbs (United States) Kathy Jordan | 7–6^{(7–5)}, 7–5 |
| Win | 7–5 | Aug 1987 | Mahwah, US | Category 3 | Hard | (United States) Lori McNeil | (United Kingdom) Anne Hobbs (Australia) Elizabeth Smylie | 6–3, 6–2 |
| Loss | 7–6 | Feb 1988 | Dallas, US | Category 4 | Hard | (United States) Zina Garrison | (United States) Lori McNeil (West Germany) Eva Pfaff | 6–2, 4–6, 5–7 |
| Loss | 7–7 | Mar 1988 | Key Biscayne, US | Category 5 | Hard | (United States) Zina Garrison | (West Germany) Steffi Graf (Argentina) Gabriela Sabatini | 6–7^{(6–8)}, 3–6 |
| Win | 8–7 | Apr 1988 | Tokyo, Japan | Category 2 | Hard | (United States) Robin White | (United States) Lea Antonoplis (United States) Barbara Gerken | 6–1, 6–4 |
| Loss | 8–8 | May 1988 | Tokyo, Japan | Category 4 | Carpet | (United States) Robin White | (United States) Pam Shriver (Czechoslovakia) Helena Suková | 6–4, 2–6, 6–7^{(5–7)} |
| Loss | 8–9 | Jul 1988 | Newport, US | Category 3 | Grass | (United States) Lori McNeil | (South Africa) Rosalyn Fairbank (United States) Barbara Potter | 4–6, 3–6 |
| Loss | 8–10 | Aug 1988 | Los Angeles, US | Category 5 | Hard | (United States) Robin White | (United States) Patty Fendick (Canada) Jill Hetherington | 6–7^{(2–7)}, 7–5, 4–6 |
| Loss | 8–11 | Aug 1988 | Mahwah, US | Category 3 | Hard | (United States) Robin White | (Czechoslovakia) Jana Novotná (Czechoslovakia) Helena Suková | 3–6, 2–6 |
| Win | 9–11 | Sep 1988 | US Open | Grand Slam | Hard | (United States) Robin White | (United States) Patty Fendick (Canada) Jill Hetherington | 6–4, 6–1 |
| Loss | 9–12 | Oct 1988 | Puerto Rico, US | Category 1 | Hard | (United States) Robin White | (United States) Patty Fendick (Canada) Jill Hetherington | 4–6, 2–6 |
| Loss | 9–13 | Nov 1988 | WTA Doubles Championships, Japan | Finals | Carpet (i) | (United States) Robin White | (United States) Katrina Adams (United States) Zina Garrison | 5–7, 5–7 |
| Loss | 9–14 | Mar 1989 | Key Biscayne, US | Category 5 | Hard | (United States) Lori McNeil | (Czechoslovakia) Jana Novotná (Czechoslovakia) Helena Suková | 6–7^{(5–7)}, 4–6 |
| Loss | 9–15 | Apr 1989 | Houston, US | Category 4 | Clay | (United States) Lori McNeil | (United States) Katrina Adams (United States) Zina Garrison | 3–6, 4–6 |
| Win | 10–15 | Jul 1989 | Newport, US | Category 3 | Grass | (United States) Lori McNeil | (Australia) Elizabeth Smylie (Australia) Wendy Turnbull | 6–3, 6–7^{(5–7)}, 7–5 |
| Win | 11–15 | Aug 1989 | Toronto, Canada | Category 5 | Hard | (United States) Robin White | (United States) Martina Navratilova (Soviet Union) Larisa Savchenko | 6–1, 7–5 |
| Win | 12–15 | Sep 1989 | WTA Doubles Championships, Japan | Finals | Carpet (i) | (United States) Robin White | (Australia) Elizabeth Smylie (Australia) Wendy Turnbull | 6–2, 6–2 |
| Win | 13–15 | Oct 1989 | Filderstadt, West Germany | Category 4 | Carpet (i) | (United States) Robin White | (Italy) Raffaella Reggi (South Africa) Elna Reinach | 6–4, 7–6^{(7–2)} |
| NA | — | Oct 1989 | Puerto Rico, US | Category 2 | Hard | (United States) Robin White | (United States) Cammy MacGregor (United States) Ronni Reis | Not played |
| Win | 14–15 | Jan 1990 | Tokyo, Japan | Tier II | Carpet (i) | (Australia) Elizabeth Smylie | (Australia) Jo-Anne Faull (Australia) Rachel McQuillan | 6–2, 6–2 |
| Loss | 14–16 | Feb 1990 | Indian Wells, US | Tier II | Hard | (United States) Martina Navratilova | (Czechoslovakia) Jana Novotná (Czechoslovakia) Helena Suková | 2–6, 6–7^{(6–8)} |
| Loss | 14–17 | Apr 1990 | San Antonio, US | Tier III | Hard | (United States) Robin White | (United States) Kathy Jordan (Australia) Elizabeth Smylie | 5–7, 5–7 |
| Win | 15–17 | May 1990 | Hamburg, West Germany | Tier II | Clay | (United States) Martina Navratilova | (Latvia) Larisa Neiland (Czechoslovakia) Helena Suková | 6–2, 6–3 |
| Win | 16–17 | Aug 1990 | Manhattan Beach, US | Tier II | Hard | (Czechoslovakia) Jana Novotná | (Argentina) Mercedes Paz (Argentina) Gabriela Sabatini | 6–3, 4–6, 6–4 |
| Win | 17–17 | Sep 1990 | US Open | Grand Slam | Hard | (United States) Martina Navratilova | (Czechoslovakia) Jana Novotná (Czechoslovakia) Helena Suková | 6–2, 6–4 |
| Loss | 17–18 | Sep 1990 | Tokyo, Japan | Tier II | Hard | (United States) Martina Navratilova | (United States) Mary Joe Fernández (United States) Robin White | 6–4, 3–6, 6–7^{(4–7)} |
| Win | 18–18 | Nov 1990 | Worcester, US | Tier II | Carpet | (Czechoslovakia) Helena Suková | (United States) Mary Joe Fernández (Czech Republic) Jana Novotná | 3–6, 6–3, 6–3 |
| Win | 19–18 | Jan 1991 | Brisbane, Australia | Tier IV | Hard | (Czechoslovakia) Jana Novotná | (United States) Patty Fendick (Czech Republic) Helena Suková | 6–3, 6–1 |
| Loss | 19–19 | Jan 1991 | Sydney | Tier III | Hard | (Czechoslovakia) Jana Novotná | (Spain) Arantxa Sánchez Vicario (Czech Republic) Helena Suková | 1–6, 4–6 |
| Loss | 19–20 | Jan 1991 | Australian Open | Grand Slam | Hard | (Czechoslovakia) Jana Novotná | (United States) Patty Fendick (United States) Mary Joe Fernández | 6–7^{(4–7)}, 1–6 |
| Win | 20–20 | Feb 1991 | Chicago, US | Tier II | Carpet | (Czechoslovakia) Jana Novotná | (United States) Martina Navratilova (United States) Pam Shriver | 6–2, 6–4 |
| Loss | 20–21 | Mar 1991 | Key Biscayne | Tier I | Hard | (Czechoslovakia) Jana Novotná | (United States) Mary Joe Fernández (United States) Zina Garrison | 5–7, 2–6 |
| Win | 21–21 | Mar 1991 | Tarpon Springs, US | Finals | Clay | (Czechoslovakia) Helena Suková | (Soviet Union) Larisa Savchenko (Soviet Union) Natasha Zvereva | 4–6, 6–4, 7–6^{(7–3)} |
| Win | 22–21 | May 1991 | French Open | Grand Slam | Clay | (Czechoslovakia) Jana Novotná | (Soviet Union) Larisa Savchenko (Soviet Union) Natasha Zvereva | 6–4, 6–0 |
| Loss | 22–22 | Jun 1991 | Eastbourne, UK | Tier II | Grass | (Czechoslovakia) Jana Novotná | (Soviet Union) Larisa Neiland (Soviet Union) Natasha Zvereva | 6–2, 4–6, 4–6 |
| Loss | 22–23 | Jun 1991 | Wimbledon | Grand Slam | Grass | (Czechoslovakia) Jana Novotná | (Soviet Union) Larisa Neiland (Soviet Union) Natasha Zvereva | 4–6, 6–3, 4–6 |
| Loss | 22–24 | Aug 1991 | San Diego, US | Tier III | Hard | (France) Nathalie Tauziat | (Canada) Jill Hetherington (United States) Kathy Rinaldi | 4–6, 6–3, 2–6 |
| Loss | 22–25 | Aug 1991 | Washington, US | Tier II | Hard | (Soviet Union) Natasha Zvereva | (Soviet Union) Larisa Neiland (Czechoslovakia) Jana Novotná | 7–5, 1–6, 6–7^{(10–12)} |
| Win | 23–25 | Nov 1991 | Oakland, US | Tier II | Carpet | (United States) Patty Fendick | (United States) Martina Navratilova (United States) Pam Shriver | 6–4, 7–5 |
| Win | 24–25 | Nov 1991 | Indianapolis, US | Tier IV | Hard | (United States) Patty Fendick | (United States) Katrina Adams (Argentina) Mercedes Paz | 6–4, 6–2 |
| Loss | 24–26 | Nov 1991 | New York | Finals | Carpet (i) | (Czechoslovakia) Jana Novotná | (United States) Martina Navratilova (United States) Pam Shriver | 6–4, 5–7, 4–6 |
| Win | 25–26 | Apr 1992 | Houston, US | Tier II | Clay | (United States) Patty Fendick | (Canada) Jill Hetherington (United States) Kathy Rinaldi | 7–5, 6–4 |
| Loss | 25–27 | May 1992 | Berlin, Germany | Tier I | Clay | (Commonwealth of Independent States) Natasha Zvereva | (Latvia) Larisa Neiland (Czechoslovakia) Jana Novotná | 6–7^{(5–7)}, 6–4, 5–7 |
| Win | 26–27 | May 1992 | French Open | Grand Slam | Clay | (Commonwealth of Independent States) Natasha Zvereva | (Spain) Conchita Martínez (Spain) Arantxa Sánchez Vicario | 6–3, 6–2 |
| Win | 27–27 | Jun 1992 | Wimbledon | Grand Slam | Grass | (Commonwealth of Independent States) Natasha Zvereva | (Latvia) Larisa Neiland (Czechoslovakia) Jana Novotná | 6–4, 6–1 |
| Win | 28–27 | Jul 1992 | Barcelona, Spain | Olympics | Clay | (United States) Mary Joe Fernández | (Spain) Conchita Martínez (Spain) Arantxa Sánchez Vicario | 7–5, 2–6, 6–2 |
| Loss | 28–28 | Aug 1992 | Canadian Open, Montreal | Tier I | Hard | (Commonwealth of Independent States) Natasha Zvereva | (United States) Lori McNeil (Australia) Rennae Stubbs | 6–3, 5–7, 5–7 |
| Win | 29–28 | Sep 1992 | US Open | Grand Slam | Hard | (Commonwealth of Independent States) Natasha Zvereva | (Latvia) Larisa Neiland (Czechoslovakia) Jana Novotná | 7–6^{(7–4)}, 6–1 |
| Loss | 29–29 | Nov 1992 | Puerto Rico, US | Tier IV | Hard | (United States) Kathy Rinaldi | (South Africa) Amanda Coetzer (South Africa) Elna Reinach | 2–6, 6–4, 2–6 |
| Win | 30–29 | Nov 1992 | Oakland, US | Tier II | Carpet (i) | (Commonwealth of Independent States) Natasha Zvereva | (South Africa) Rosalyn Fairbank-Nideffer (United States) Gretchen Magers | 3–6, 6–2, 6–4 |
| Win | 31–29 | Nov 1992 | Philadelphia, US | Tier II | Carpet (i) | (Belarus) Natasha Zvereva | (Spain) Conchita Martínez (France) Mary Pierce | 6–1, 6–3 |
| Win | 32–29 | Jan 1993 | Australian Open, Melbourne | Grand Slam | Hard | (Belarus) Natasha Zvereva | (United States) Pam Shriver (Australia) Elizabeth Smylie | 6–4, 6–3 |
| Win | 33–29 | Mar 1993 | Delray Beach, US | Tier II | Hard | (Belarus) Natasha Zvereva | (Latvia) Larisa Neiland (Czech Republic) Jana Novotná | 6–2, 6–2 |
| Win | 34–29 | Mar 1993 | Wesley Chapel, US | Finals | Clay | (Belarus) Natasha Zvereva | (Latvia) Larisa Neiland (Spain) Arantxa Sánchez Vicario | 7–5, 6–3 |
| Win | 35–29 | Mar 1993 | Hilton Head, US | Tier I | Clay | (Belarus) Natasha Zvereva | (United States) Katrina Adams (Netherlands) Manon Bollegraf | 6–3, 6–1 |
| Win | 36–29 | May 1993 | Berlin, Germany | Tier I | Clay | (Belarus) Natasha Zvereva | (United States) Debbie Graham (Netherlands) Brenda Schultz | 6–1, 6–3 |
| Win | 37–29 | May 1993 | French Open, Paris | Grand Slam | Clay | (Belarus) Natasha Zvereva | (Latvia) Larisa Neiland (Czech Republic) Jana Novotná | 6–3, 7–5 |
| Win | 38–29 | Jun 1993 | Eastbourne, UK | Tier II | Grass | (Belarus) Natasha Zvereva | (Latvia) Larisa Neiland (Czech Republic) Jana Novotná | 2–6, 7–5, 6–1 |
| Win | 39–29 | Jun 1993 | Wimbledon | Grand Slam | Grass | (Belarus) Natasha Zvereva | (Latvia) Larisa Neiland (Czech Republic) Jana Novotná | 6–4, 6–7^{(9–11)}, 6–4 |
| Loss | 39–30 | Aug 1993 | Puerto Rico Open | Tier IV | Hard | (Australia) Rennae Stubbs | (United States) Ann Wunderlich (United States) Debbie Graham | 5–7, 7–5, 7–5 |
| Win | 40–30 | Aug 1993 | San Diego, US | Tier II | Hard | (Czechoslovakia) Helena Suková | (United States) Pam Shriver (Australia) Elizabeth Smylie | 6–4, 6–3 |
| Loss | 40–31 | Aug 1993 | Los Angeles, US | Tier II | Hard | (Belarus) Natasha Zvereva | (Spain) Arantxa Sánchez Vicario (Czech Republic) Helena Suková | 6–7^{(3–7)}, 3–6 |
| Win | 41–31 | Sep 1993 | Leipzig, Germany | Tier II | Carpet (i) | (Belarus) Natasha Zvereva | (Latvia) Larisa Neiland (Czech Republic) Jana Novotná | 6–3, 6–2 |
| Loss | 41–32 | Oct 1993 | Zurich, Switzerland | Tier I | Hard (i) | (Belarus) Natasha Zvereva | (United States) Zina Garrison (United States) Martina Navratilova | 3–6, 7–5, 3–6 |
| Win | 42–32 | Oct 1993 | Filderstadt, Germany | Tier II | Hard (i) | (Belarus) Natasha Zvereva | (United States) Patty Fendick (United States) Martina Navratilova | 7–6^{(8–6)}, 6–4 |
| Win | 43–32 | Nov 1993 | VS Championships, New York | Finals | Carpet (i) | (Belarus) Natasha Zvereva | (Latvia) Larisa Neiland (Czech Republic) Jana Novotná | 6–3, 7–5 |
| Win | 44–32 | Jan 1994 | Australian Open, Melbourne | Grand Slam | Hard | (Belarus) Natasha Zvereva | (United States) Patty Fendick (United States) Meredith McGrath | 6–3, 4–6, 6–4 |
| Win | 45–32 | Feb 1994 | Chicago, US | Tier II | Carpet (i) | (Belarus) Natasha Zvereva | (Netherlands) Manon Bollegraf (United States) Martina Navratilova | 6–3, 4–6, 6–4 |
| Win | 46–32 | Mar 1994 | Key Biscayne, US | Tier I | Hard | (Belarus) Natasha Zvereva | (United States) Patty Fendick (United States) Meredith McGrath | 6–3, 6–1 |
| Loss | 46–33 | Mar 1994 | WTA Doubles Championships, US | Finals | Clay | (Belarus) Natasha Zvereva | (Czech Republic) Jana Novotná (Spain) Arantxa Sánchez Vicario | 2–6, 5–7 |
| Loss | 46–34 | Mar 1994 | Hilton Head, US | Tier I | Clay | (Belarus) Natasha Zvereva | (United States) Lori McNeil (Spain) Arantxa Sánchez Vicario | 4–6, 1–4 ret. |
| Win | 47–34 | May 1994 | Italian Open, Rome | Tier I | Clay | (Belarus) Natasha Zvereva | (Argentina) Gabriela Sabatini (Netherlands) Brenda Schultz | 6–1, 6–3 |
| Win | 48–34 | May 1994 | German Open, Berlin | Tier I | Clay | (Belarus) Natasha Zvereva | (Czech Republic) Jana Novotná (Spain) Arantxa Sánchez Vicario | 6–3, 7–6^{(7–2)} |
| Win | 49–34 | May 1994 | French Open, Paris | Grand Slam | Clay | (Belarus) Natasha Zvereva | (United States) Lindsay Davenport (United States) Lisa Raymond | 6–2, 6–2 |
| Win | 50–34 | Jun 1994 | Eastbourne, UK | Tier II | Grass | (Belarus) Natasha Zvereva | (Argentina) Inés Gorrochategui (Czech Republic) Helena Suková | 6–7^{(4–7)}, 6–4, 6–3 |
| Win | 51–34 | Jun 1994 | Wimbledon | Grand Slam | Grass | (Belarus) Natasha Zvereva | (Czech Republic) Jana Novotná (Spain) Arantxa Sánchez Vicario | 6–4, 6–1 |
| Win | 52–34 | Oct 1994 | Filderstadt, Germany | Tier II | Hard (i) | (Belarus) Natasha Zvereva | (Netherlands) Manon Bollegraf (Latvia) Larisa Neiland | 7–6^{(7–5)}, 6–4 |
| Loss | 52–35 | Nov 1994 | Oakland, US | Tier II | Carpet (i) | (United States) Martina Navratilova | (United States) Lindsay Davenport (Spain) Arantxa Sánchez Vicario | 5–7, 4–6 |
| Win | 53–35 | Nov 1994 | Philadelphia, US | Tier I | Carpet (i) | (Belarus) Natasha Zvereva | (Argentina) Gabriela Sabatini (Netherlands) Brenda Schultz | 4–6, 6–4, 6–2 |
| Win | 54–35 | Nov 1994 | VS Championships | Finals | Carpet (i) | (Belarus) Natasha Zvereva | (Latvia) Larisa Neiland (Czech Republic) Jana Novotná | 6–3, 6–7^{(4–7)}, 6–3 |
| Loss | 54–36 | Jan 1995 | Australian Open | Grand Slam | Hard | (Belarus) Natasha Zvereva | (Czech Republic) Jana Novotná (Spain) Arantxa Sánchez Vicario | 3–6, 7–6^{(7–3)}, 4–6 |
| Win | 55–36 | Feb 1995 | Tokyo, Japan | Tier I | Carpet (i) | (Belarus) Natasha Zvereva | (United States) Lindsay Davenport (Australia) Rennae Stubbs | 6–0, 6–3 |
| Loss | 55–37 | Mar 1995 | Key Biscayne, US | Tier I | Hard | (Belarus) Natasha Zvereva | (Czech Republic) Jana Novotná (Spain) Arantxa Sánchez Vicario | 5–7, 6–2, 3–6 |
| Loss | 55–38 | Apr 1995 | Hilton Head, US | Tier I | Clay | (Belarus) Natasha Zvereva | (United States) Nicole Arendt (Netherlands) Manon Bollegraf | 6–0, 3–6, 4–6 |
| Win | 56–38 | May 1995 | Hamburg, Germany | Tier II | Clay | (Switzerland) Martina Hingis | (Spain) Conchita Martínez (Argentina) Patricia Tarabini | 6–2, 6–3 |
| Win | 57–38 | May 1995 | Italian Open, Rome | Tier I | Clay | (Belarus) Natasha Zvereva | (Spain) Conchita Martínez (Argentina) Patricia Tarabini | 3–6, 7–6^{(7–3)}, 6–4 |
| Win | 58–38 | Jun 1995 | French Open | Grand Slam | Clay | (Belarus) Natasha Zvereva | (Czech Republic) Jana Novotná (Spain) Arantxa Sánchez Vicario | 6–7^{(6–8)}, 6–4, 7–5 |
| Loss | 58–39 | Jun 1995 | Eastbourne, UK | Tier II | Grass | (Belarus) Natasha Zvereva | (Czech Republic) Jana Novotná (Spain) Arantxa Sánchez Vicario | 6–0, 3–6, 4–6 |
| Loss | 58–40 | Jul 1995 | Wimbledon | Grand Slam | Grass | (Belarus) Natasha Zvereva | (Czech Republic) Jana Novotná (Spain) Arantxa Sánchez Vicario | 7–5, 5–7, 4–6 |
| Win | 59–40 | Aug 1995 | San Diego, US | Tier II | Hard | (Belarus) Natasha Zvereva | (France) Alexia Dechaume-Balleret (France) Sandrine Testud | 6–2, 6–1 |
| Win | 60–40 | Aug 1995 | Los Angeles, US | Tier II | Hard | (Belarus) Natasha Zvereva | (Latvia) Larisa Neiland (Argentina) Gabriela Sabatini | 7–5, 6–7^{(2–7)}, 7–5 |
| Win | 61–40 | Sep 1995 | US Open | Grand Slam | Hard | (Belarus) Natasha Zvereva | (Netherlands) Brenda Schultz-McCarthy (Australia) Rennae Stubbs | 6–4, 7–6^{(8–6)} |
| Win | 62–40 | Oct 1995 | Filderstadt, Germany | Tier II | Hard (i) | (Belarus) Natasha Zvereva | (United States) Meredith McGrath (Latvia) Larisa Neiland | 5–7, 6–1, 6–4 |
| Loss | 62–41 | Nov 1995 | WTA Tour Championships, US | Finals | Carpet (i) | (Belarus) Natasha Zvereva | (Czech Republic) Jana Novotná (Spain) Arantxa Sánchez Vicario | 2–6, 1–6 |
| Win | 63–41 | Feb 1996 | Tokyo, Japan | Tier I | Carpet (i) | (Belarus) Natasha Zvereva | (South Africa) Mariaan de Swardt (Romania) Irina Spîrlea | 7–6^{(9–7)}, 6–3 |
| Loss | 63–42 | Apr 1996 | Hilton Head, US | Tier I | Clay | (United States) Mary Joe Fernández | (Czech Republic) Jana Novotná (Spain) Arantxa Sánchez Vicario | 2–6, 3–6 |
| Loss | 63–43 | May 1996 | Hamburg, Germany | Tier II | Clay | (Switzerland) Martina Hingis | (Spain) Arantxa Sánchez Vicario (Netherlands) Brenda Schultz-McCarthy | 6–4, 6–7^{(10–12)}, 4–6 |
| Loss | 63–44 | May 1996 | Italian Open, Rome | Tier I | Clay | (Switzerland) Martina Hingis | (Spain) Arantxa Sánchez Vicario (Romania) Irina Spîrlea | 4–6, 6–3, 3–6 |
| Loss | 63–45 | May 1996 | WTA Doubles Championships, UK | Finals | Clay | (Belarus) Natasha Zvereva | (United States) Nicole Arendt (Netherlands) Manon Bollegraf | 3–6, 6–2, 6–7^{(6–8)} |
| Loss | 63–46 | Jun 1996 | French Open | Grand Slam | Clay | (Belarus) Natasha Zvereva | (United States) Lindsay Davenport (United States) Mary Joe Fernández | 2–6, 1–6 |
| Win | 64–46 | Jul 1996 | Atlanta, US | Olympics | Hard | (United States) Mary Joe Fernández | (Czechoslovakia) Jana Novotná (Czechoslovakia) Helena Suková | 7–6^{(8–6)}, 6–4 |
| Win | 65–46 | Aug 1996 | San Diego, US | Tier II | Hard | (Spain) Conchita Martínez | (Spain) Arantxa Sánchez Vicario (Latvia) Larisa Neiland | 4–6, 6–3, 6–4 |
| Win | 66–46 | Sep 1996 | US Open | Grand Slam | Hard | (Belarus) Natasha Zvereva | (Czech Republic) Jana Novotná (Spain) Arantxa Sánchez Vicario | 1–6, 6–1, 6–4 |
| Win | 67–46 | Jan 1997 | Sydney, Australia | Tier II | Hard | (Spain) Arantxa Sánchez Vicario | (United States) Lindsay Davenport (Belarus) Natasha Zvereva | 6–3, 6–1 |
| Loss | 67–47 | Feb 1997 | Tokyo, Japan | Tier I | Carpet (i) | (Switzerland) Martina Hingis | (United States) Lindsay Davenport (Belarus) Natasha Zvereva | 4–6, 3–6 |
| Loss | 67–48 | May 1997 | German Open, Berlin | Tier I | Clay | (Belarus) Natasha Zvereva | (United States) Lindsay Davenport (Czech Republic) Jana Novotná | 2–6, 6–3, 2–6 |
| Win | 68–48 | Jun 1997 | French Open | Grand Slam | Clay | (Belarus) Natasha Zvereva | (United States) Mary Joe Fernández (United States) Lisa Raymond | 6–2, 6–3 |
| Win | 69–48 | Jul 1997 | Wimbledon | Grand Slam | Grass | (Belarus) Natasha Zvereva | (United States) Nicole Arendt (Netherlands) Manon Bollegraf | 6–2, 3–6, 6–1 |
| Loss | 69–49 | Sep 1997 | US Open | Grand Slam | Hard | (Belarus) Natasha Zvereva | (United States) Lindsay Davenport (Czech Republic) Jana Novotná | 3–6, 4–6 |

== See also ==
- History of women in Puerto Rico
- List of Puerto Ricans
- Monica Puig
- Sports in Puerto Rico
