= Linda Wild =

American tennis player

- Country (sports): United States
- Born: February 11, 1971 (age 54) Arlington Heights, Illinois
- Height: 5 ft 7 in (1.70 m)
- Retired: 2000
- Plays: Right-handed
- Prize money: $1,237,931

Singles
- Career record: 239–201
- Career titles: 5
- Highest ranking: No. 23 (September 9, 1996)

Grand Slam singles results
- Australian Open: 2R (1992, 1994, 1995, 1996)
- French Open: 3R (1991, 1996)
- Wimbledon: 3R (1991, 1994, 1996)
- US Open: QF (1996)

Doubles
- Career record: 175–157
- Career titles: 5
- Highest ranking: No. 17 (July 8, 1996)

Grand Slam doubles results
- Australian Open: 3R (1993, 1995, 1996, 1997)
- French Open: 3R (1992, 1996)
- Wimbledon: SF (1996)
- US Open: 3R (1995, 1999)

Linda Harvey Wild (born February 11, 1971) is a retired tennis player from the United States. Born as Linda Harvey, she later used the family name of her stepfather and coach Steve Wild.

Wild turned professional in 1989. In the first round of her first tournament in February 1990 in her hometown of Chicago, she defeated then fifth-ranked Arantxa Sánchez Vicario. During her career on the WTA Tour, she won five singles and five doubles titles. Her best Grand Slam singles performance came at the 1996 US Open, where she defeated Park Sung-hee, Kristie Boogert, Barbara Rittner and Lindsay Davenport to reach the quarterfinals, where she was defeated by Conchita Martínez. Her best doubles result she realized at the 1996 Wimbledon Championships, reaching the semifinals with Elizabeth Smylie.

Wild was a member of the United States Fed Cup team that won 1996 the title. She reached career-high rankings of No. 23 in singles (in September 1996) and No. 17 in doubles (July 1996). She retired from the tour in 2000.

== WTA career finals ==
Legend (singles)
Tier I (0)
Tier II (2)
Tier III (1)
Tier IV (6)

=== Singles: 9 (5 titles, 4 runner-ups) ===
Result	W/L	Date	Tournament	Surface	Opponent	Score
Loss	0–1	Jun 1992	Eastbourne International, UK	Grass	(United States) Lori McNeil	4–6, 4–6
Loss	0–2	Nov 1992	Indianapolis, U.S.	Hard (i)	(Czechoslovakia) Helena Suková	4–6, 3–6
Win	1–2	Jul 1993	Puerto Rico Open	Hard	(United States) Ann Grossman	6–3, 5–7, 6–3
Win	2–2	Sep 1993	Sapporo, Japan	Carpet (i)	(Romania) Irina Spîrlea	6–4, 6–3
Loss	2–3	Oct 1993	Taipei, Taiwan	Hard	(Chinese Taipei) Wang Shi-ting	1–6, 6–7^{(4–7)}
Loss	2–4	Jun 1994	Eastbourne International, UK	Grass	(United States) Meredith McGrath	2–6, 4–6
Win	3–4	Sep 1995	Nagoya, Japan	Carpet (i)	(Czech Republic) Sandra Kleinová	6–4, 6–2
Win	4–4	Sep 1995	China Open	Hard	(Chinese Taipei) Wang Shi-ting	7–5, 6–2
Win	5–4	Apr 1996	Jakarta Open, Indonesia	Hard	(Indonesia) Yayuk Basuki	Walkover

=== Doubles: 11 (5 titles, 6 runner-ups) ===
Result	W/L	Date	Tournament	Surface	Partner	Opponents	Score
Loss	0–1	Mar 1992	VS of Florida, U.S.	Hard	(Spain) Conchita Martínez	(Latvia) Larisa Neiland (Belarus) Natasha Zvereva	2–6, 2–6
Loss	0–2	Sep 1993	Nichirei Open, Japan	Hard	(South Africa) Amanda Coetzer	(United States) Lisa Raymond (United States) Chanda Rubin	4–6, 1–6
Win	1–2	Jan 1994	Hobart International, Australia	Hard	(United States) Chanda Rubin	(Australia) Jenny Byrne (Australia) Rachel McQuillan	7–5, 4–6, 7–6^{(7–1)}
Win	2–2	May 1994	Prague Open, Czech Republic	Clay	(South Africa) Amanda Coetzer	(Netherlands) Kristie Boogert (Italy) Laura Golarsa	6–4, 3–6, 6–2
Loss	2–3	Oct 1994	Bell Challenge, Canada	Carpet (i)	(United States) Chanda Rubin	(South Africa) Elna Reinach (France) Nathalie Tauziat	4–6, 3–6
Loss	2–4	Feb 1995	Puerto Rico Open	Hard	(Italy) Laura Golarsa	(Austria) Karin Kschwendt (Canada) Rene Simpson	2–6, 6–0, 4–6
Win	3–4	May 1995	Prague Open, Czech Republic	Clay	(United States) Chanda Rubin	(Sweden) Maria Lindström (Sweden) Maria Strandlund	6–7^{(3–7)}, 6–3, 6–2
Loss	3–5	Sep 1995	Japan Open	Hard	(South Africa) Amanda Coetzer	(United States) Lindsay Davenport (United States) Mary Joe Fernández	3–6, 2–6
Win	4–5	Sep 1995	China Open	Hard	(Germany) Claudia Porwik	(Chinese Taipei) Wang Shi-ting (Netherlands) Stephanie Rottier	6–1, 6–0
Win	5–5	Jun 1996	Birmingham Classic, UK	Grass	(Australia) Elizabeth Smylie	(United States) Lori McNeil (France) Nathalie Tauziat	6–3, 3–6, 6–1
Loss	5–6	Jun 1997	Birmingham Classic, UK	Grass	(France) Nathalie Tauziat	(United States) Katrina Adams (Latvia) Larisa Neiland	2–6, 3–6
