= Louise Allen (tennis) =

American tennis player

- Country (sports): United States
- Born: January 7, 1962 (age 64)
- Turned pro: 1982
- Retired: 1993
- College: Trinity University
- Prize money: $319,712

Singles
- Career record: 174–163
- Career titles: 0, 3 ITF
- Highest ranking: No. 65 (July 4, 1983)

Grand Slam singles results
- Australian Open: 1R (1987, 1989, 1990)
- French Open: 2R (1992, 1993)
- Wimbledon: 3R (1983)
- US Open: 2R (1983, 1992)

Doubles
- Career record: 87–120
- Career titles: 0, 5 ITF
- Highest ranking: No. 65 (February 1, 1993)

Grand Slam doubles results
- Australian Open: 2R (1987, 1989, 1990)
- French Open: 2R (1988, 1989)
- Wimbledon: 2R (1989)
- US Open: 3R (1983)

Louise Allen (born January 7, 1962) is a retired American tennis player.

Allen attended Trinity University in San Antonio, Texas, where she was a four-time All-American (1981–1984) and won the 1983 NCAA Division I Women's Doubles Championship and the 1983 Pan American Games women's doubles, both times with partner Gretchen Rush. The same year, she received the Broderick Award (now the Honda Sports Award, awarded annually to the best collegiate athletes in 12 sports) for tennis. She graduated in 1984 with a Bachelor of Science degree in business administration.

Allen played in all four Grand Slam tournaments, with her best results coming in 1983, when she reached the third round at Wimbledon in singles and the US Open with doubles partner Gretchen Magers (née Rush). According to the Trinity University Hall of Fame, she won five singles and eight doubles titles in all.

Allen retired in 1993. She was inducted into the ITA Women's College Tennis Hall of Fame (2024), the North Carolina Tennis Hall of Fame and the Trinity University Hall of Fame.
