= Audra Keller =

American tennis player

- Country (sports): United States
- Born: November 17, 1971 (age 53) Macon, Georgia
- Prize money: US$ 365,726

Singles
- Career titles: 0
- Highest ranking: No. 77 (August 10, 1992)

Grand Slam singles results
- Australian Open: 2R (1990, 1995)
- French Open: 1R (1990, 1991, 1992, 1995)
- Wimbledon: 2R (1991, 1992)
- US Open: 2R (1993, 1994)

Doubles
- Career titles: 0
- Highest ranking: No. 92 (September 20, 1993)

Grand Slam doubles results
- Australian Open: 2R (1996)
- French Open: 1R (1992)
- US Open: 1R (1989, 1993, 1995)

Audra Keller (born November 17, 1971) is a retired American professional tennis player who competed on the WTA Tour from 1988 to 1996. In 1991, she was runner-up to Katerina Maleeva at the Virginia Slims of Indianapolis, falling 7–6, 6–2 in the finals. She achieved a career-best ranking of #77 in August 1992.
