= Puerto Rico Open (tennis) =

Defunct tennis tournament
- Event name: Puerto Rico Open (1986, 1989–95); Honda Classic (1987–88)
- Tour: WTA Tour
- Founded: 1986
- Abolished: 1995
- Editions: 12
- Location: San Juan, Puerto Rico (1986–89); Dorado, Puerto Rico (1990–95)
- Surface: Hard

The Puerto Rico Open is a defunct women's tennis tournament. First played in San Juan, Puerto Rico, it then moved to Dorado, Puerto Rico in 1990 and was played on outdoor hard courts. In 1988, when Tier categories were first introduced on the WTA Tour, the Open became part of Tier IV. One last edition was played in 1995, this time featuring in Tier III. The event was the successor tournament to the Avon Futures of Puerto Rico (1980-1981).

== Results ==
=== Singles ===
Year	Champions	Runners-up	Score
1986	(Italy) Raffaella Reggi	(Socialist Federal Republic of Yugoslavia) Sabrina Goleš	7–6^{(7–4)}, 4–6, 6–3
1987	(United States) Stephanie Rehe	(United States) Camille Benjamin	7–5, 7–6^{(7–4)}
1988	(Australia) Anne Minter	(Argentina) Mercedes Paz	2–6, 6–4, 6–3
1989	(Peru) Laura Gildemeister	(United States) Gigi Fernández	6–1, 6–2
1990	(United States) Jennifer Capriati	(United States) Zina Garrison-Jackson	5–7, 6–4, 6–2
1991	(France) Julie Halard	(South Africa) Amanda Coetzer	7–5, 7–5
1992	(France) Mary Pierce	(United States) Gigi Fernández	6–1, 7–5
1993	(United States) Linda Harvey-Wild	(United States) Ann Grossman	6–3, 5–7, 6–3
1994	Not held		
1995	(South Africa) Joannette Kruger	(Japan) Kyōko Nagatsuka	7–6^{(7–5)}, 6–3

=== Doubles ===
Year	Champions	Runners-up	Score
1986	(United States) Lori McNeil (Argentina) Mercedes Paz	(United States) Gigi Fernández (United States) Robin White	6–2, 3–6, 6–4
1987	(South Africa) Lise Gregory (United States) Ronni Reis	(United States) Cammy MacGregor (United States) Cynthia MacGregor	7–5, 7–5
1988	(United States) Patty Fendick (Canada) Jill Hetherington	(United States) Gigi Fernández (United States) Robin White	6–4, 6–2
1989	Not completed		
1990	(Soviet Union) Elena Brioukhovets (Soviet Union) Natalia Medvedeva	(United States) Amy Frazier (New Zealand) Julie Richardson	6–4, 6–2
1991	(Japan) Rika Hiraki (Argentina) Florencia Labat	(Belgium) Sabine Appelmans (United States) Camille Benjamin	6–3, 6–3
1992	(South Africa) Amanda Coetzer (South Africa) Elna Reinach	(United States) Gigi Fernández (United States) Kathy Rinaldi-Stunkel	6–2, 4–6, 6–2
1993	(United States) Debbie Graham (United States) Ann Grossman	(United States) Gigi Fernández (Australia) Rennae Stubbs	5–7, 7–5, 7–5
1994	Not held		
1995	(Germany) Karin Kschwendt (Canada) Rene Simpson	(Italy) Laura Golarsa (United States) Linda Harvey-Wild	6–2, 0–6, 6–4

== See also ==
- Avon Futures of Puerto Rico
