= 1982 Wells Fargo Open – Singles =

Singles
- 1982 Wells Fargo Open

Final
- Champion: (United States) Tracy Austin
- Runner-up: (United States) Kathy Rinaldi
- Score: 7–6^{(7–5)}, 6–3

Details
- Draw: 56 (8Q/2LL)
- Seeds: 14

Events
Singles	Doubles
- San Diego Open

Tracy Austin became a four-time champion at San Diego, by defeating Kathy Rinaldi 7–6^{(7–5)}, 6–3 in the final.

== Seeds ==
The first eight seeds received a bye to the second round.

1. (United States) Tracy Austin (champion)
2. (United States) Kathy Rinaldi (final)
3. (United States) Kathy Jordan (semifinals)
4. (United States) Bonnie Gadusek (quarterfinals)
5. (Czechoslovakia) Helena Suková (second round)
6. (Italy) Sabina Simmonds (second round)
7. (Australia) Dianne Fromholtz (second round)
8. (United States) Kate Latham (quarterfinals)
9. (Netherlands) Marcella Mesker (second round)
10. (Brazil) Patricia Medrado (first round)
11. (United States) Susan Mascarin (first round)
12. (United States) Peanut Louie (second round)
13. (United States) Barbara Hallquist (second round)
14. (United States) Lea Antonoplis (second round)

== Draw ==
Key

- Q = Qualifier
- WC = Wild card
- LL = Lucky loser
- Alt = Alternate
- ITF = ITF entry
- PR = Protected ranking
- SR = Special ranking
- SE = Special exempt
- JE = Junior exempt
- JR = Junior Accelerator Programme entrant
- CO = College Accelerator Programme entrant
- NG = Next Gen Accelerator Program entrant
- w/o = Walkover
- r = Retired
- d = Defaulted

=== Finals ===
Quarterfinals
1	(United States) Tracy Austin	6	6
8	(United States) Kate Latham	0	0
3	(United States) Kathy Jordan	6	3	6
(United States) Louise Allen	2	6	4
(France) Corinne Vanier	6	6
4	(United States) Bonnie Gadusek	4	2
(United States) Alycia Moulton	6	6	3
2	(United States) Kathy Rinaldi	0	7	6

Semifinals
1	(United States) Tracy Austin	6	6
3	(United States) Kathy Jordan	1	2
(France) Corinne Vanier	1	4
2	(United States) Kathy Rinaldi	6	6

Final
1	(United States) Tracy Austin	7^{7}	6
2	(United States) Kathy Rinaldi	6^{5}	3

=== Top half ===
==== Section 1 ====
First round
(United Kingdom) G Coles	1	6	4
(Italy) B Rossi	6	2	6
(United States) L Doherty	3	1
(United States) B Herr	6	6
Q	(United States) H Ludloff	4	7	4
14	(United States) L Antonoplis	6	5	6
11	(United States) S Mascarin	6	4
(United States) J Davis	7	6
(United States) K Jones	2	3
(United States) D Gilbert	6	6
LL	(United States) M Louie	2	2
(Switzerland) P Delhees	6	6

Second round
1	(United States) T Austin	6	6
(Italy) B Rossi	1	1
(United States) B Herr	6	6
14	(United States) L Antonoplis	0	2
(United States) J Davis	6	7
(United States) D Gilbert	2	6
(Switzerland) P Delhees	2	3
8	(United States) K Latham	6	6

Third round
1	(United States) T Austin	6	6
(United States) B Herr	0	0
(United States) J Davis	5	6	3
8	(United States) K Latham	7	1	6

Quarterfinals
1	(United States) T Austin	6	6
8	(United States) K Latham	0	0

==== Section 2 ====
First round
Q	(United States) K Gompert	6	4	5
(United Kingdom) A Hobbs	4	6	7
(Brazil) C Monteiro	6	6
LL	(United States) J Hepner	0	4
(United States) E Burgin	5	1
9	(Netherlands) M Mesker	7	6
(Czechoslovakia) I Budařová	6	6	6
(United States) AM Fernandez	7	4	7
(United States) D Desfor	6	6
Q	(Sweden) C Jexell	3	0
(United States) L Allen	6	6
(Australia) S Leo	3	2

Second round
3	(United States) K Jordan	6	6
(United Kingdom) A Hobbs	3	4
(Brazil) C Monteiro	1	7	6
9	(Netherlands) M Mesker	6	6	2
(United States) AM Fernandez	6	7
(United States) D Desfor	4	5
(United States) L Allen	7	7
5	(Czechoslovakia) H Suková	5	6

Third round
3	(United States) K Jordan	6	5	6
(Brazil) C Monteiro	1	7	3
(United States) AM Fernandez	1	4
(United States) L Allen	6	6

Quarterfinals
3	(United States) K Jordan	6	3	6
(United States) L Allen	2	6	4

=== Bottom half ===
==== Section 3 ====
First round
Q	(Switzerland) C Jolissaint	5	3
(United States) R Blount	7	6
(United States) S McInerney	1	2
(United States) V Nelson	6	6
(France) C Vanier	4	6	6
(Sweden) C Lindqvist	6	4	3
12	(United States) P Louie	6	2	7
Q	(United States) J Goodling	0	6	5
Q	(United States) S Solomon	0	6	6
(Peru) L Arraya	6	2	4
(Peru) P Vásquez	2	2
(United States) K Henry	6	6

Second round
6	(Italy) S Simmonds	6	3	1
(United States) R Blount	3	6	6
(United States) V Nelson	7	6	2
(France) C Vanier	6	7	6
12	(United States) P Louie	4	1
Q	(United States) S Solomon	6	6
(United States) K Henry	0	5
4	(United States) B Gadusek	6	7

Third round
(United States) R Blount	3	5
(France) C Vanier	6	7
Q	(United States) S Solomon	2	3
4	(United States) B Gadusek	6	6

Quarterfinals
(France) C Vanier	6	6
4	(United States) B Gadusek	4	2

==== Section 4 ====
First round
(United States) B Bramblett	6	7
Q	(United States) M Bladel	1	5
(United States) T Lewis	2	3
(United States) A Moulton	6	6
(United States) P Smith	4	3
13	(United States) B Hallquist	6	6
10	(Brazil) P Medrado	7	6	5
Q	(United States) C Benjamin	5	7	7
(United States) J Preyer	2	6	5
(United States) T Mochizuki	6	2	7
(United States) K Cummings	2	6	1
(United States) J Harrington	6	2	6

Second round
7	(Australia) D Fromholtz	0	4
(United States) B Bramblett	6	6
(United States) A Moulton	6	6
13	(United States) B Hallquist	0	3
Q	(United States) C Benjamin	7	6
(United States) T Mochizuki	5	4
(United States) J Harrington	3	6
2	(United States) K Rinaldi	6	7

Third round
(United States) B Bramblett	3	0
(United States) A Moulton	6	6
Q	(United States) C Benjamin	3	1
2	(United States) K Rinaldi	6	6

Quarterfinals
(United States) A Moulton	6	6	3
2	(United States) K Rinaldi	0	7	6
