= 1982 Wells Fargo Open – Doubles =

Doubles
- 1982 Wells Fargo Open

Final
- Champions: (United States) Kathy Jordan (United States) Paula Smith
- Runners-up: (Brazil) Patricia Medrado (Brazil) Cláudia Monteiro
- Score: 6–3, 5–7, 7–6^{(7–3)}

Details
- Draw: 32
- Seeds: 8

Events
Singles	Doubles
- San Diego Open

Kathy Jordan and Candy Reynolds were the defending champions, but Reynolds did not compete this year.

Jordan teamed up with Paula Smith and successfully defended her title, by defeating Patricia Medrado and Cláudia Monteiro 6–3, 5–7, 7–6^{(7–3)} in the final.

== Seeds ==
1. (United States) Kathy Jordan / (United States) Paula Smith (champions)
2. (United Kingdom) Anne Hobbs / (Australia) Susan Leo (first round, withdrew)
3. (United States) Peanut Louie / (United States) Marita Redondo (second round)
4. (Brazil) Patricia Medrado / (Brazil) Cláudia Monteiro (final)
5. (Australia) Dianne Fromholtz / (United States) Bonnie Gadusek (semifinals)
6. (Czechoslovakia) Iva Budařová / (Czechoslovakia) Helena Suková (quarterfinals)
7. (United States) Diane Desfor / (United States) Barbara Hallquist (quarterfinals)
8. (United States) Terry Holladay / (United States) Kimberly Jones (first round)

== Draw ==
Key

- Q = Qualifier
- WC = Wild card
- LL = Lucky loser
- Alt = Alternate
- ITF = ITF entry
- PR = Protected ranking
- SR = Special ranking
- SE = Special exempt
- JE = Junior exempt
- JR = Junior Accelerator Programme entrant
- CO = College Accelerator Programme entrant
- NG = Next Gen Accelerator Program entrant
- w/o = Walkover
- r = Retired
- d = Defaulted

=== Finals ===
Semifinals
1	(United States) Kathy Jordan (United States) Paula Smith	7	6
(United States) Elise Burgin (United States) Alycia Moulton	6	1
4	(Brazil) Patricia Medrado (Brazil) Cláudia Monteiro	6	6
5	(Australia) Dianne Fromholtz (United States) Bonnie Gadusek	3	2

Final
1	(United States) Kathy Jordan (United States) Paula Smith	6	5	7^{7}
4	(Brazil) Patricia Medrado (Brazil) Cláudia Monteiro	3	7	6^{3}

=== Top half ===
First round
1	(United States) K Jordan (United States) P Smith	w/o
(United States) B Bramblett (United States) K Gompert
(United States) J Goodling (United States) V Nelson	6	6
(United States) K Henry (United States) S Solomon	2	4
(United States) L Allen (United States) K Cummings	4	3
(United States) L Antonoplis (United States) AM Fernandez	6	6
(United States) B Herr (United States) M Louie	6	6
8	(United States) T Holladay (United States) K Jones	3	2
3	(United States) P Louie (United States) M Redondo	6	1	6
(Netherlands) M Mesker (France) C Vanier	3	6	3
(Switzerland) P Delhees (Switzerland) C Jolissaint	2	6
(United States) E Burgin (United States) A Moulton	6	7
(United States) S McInerney (United States) J Preyer	6	5	1
(Peru) L Arraya (Peru) P Vásquez	1	7	6
(United States) B Bruning (United States) B Jordan	4	3
6	(Czechoslovakia) I Budařová (Czechoslovakia) H Suková	6	6

Second round
1	(United States) K Jordan (United States) P Smith	6	6
(United States) J Goodling (United States) V Nelson	0	4
(United States) L Antonoplis (United States) AM Fernandez	4	7	6
(United States) B Herr (United States) M Louie	6	6	0
3	(United States) P Louie (United States) M Redondo	4	2
(United States) E Burgin (United States) A Moulton	6	6
(Peru) L Arraya (Peru) P Vásquez	4	1
6	(Czechoslovakia) I Budařová (Czechoslovakia) H Suková	6	6

Quarterfinals
1	(United States) K Jordan (United States) P Smith	6	4	6
(United States) L Antonoplis (United States) AM Fernandez	4	6	4
(United States) E Burgin (United States) A Moulton	6	6
6	(Czechoslovakia) I Budařová (Czechoslovakia) H Suková	3	3

Semifinals
1	(United States) K Jordan (United States) P Smith	7	6
(United States) E Burgin (United States) A Moulton	6	1

=== Bottom half ===
First round
7	(United States) D Desfor (United States) B Hallquist	6	6
(Spain) V Baldovinos-Cibeira (Spain) C Perea Alcalá	0	4
(Jamaica) J Van Ryck De Groot (Argentina) A Villagrán	2	4
(France) B Simon (France) F Thibault	6	6
(United Kingdom) G Coles (Australia) B Remilton	7	0	1
(United States) J Davis (United States) H Ludloff	6	6	6
(Italy) P Murgo (Italy) S Simmonds	6	4	3
4	(Brazil) P Medrado (Brazil) C Monteiro	2	6	6
5	(Australia) D Fromholtz (United States) B Gadusek	6	6
(United States) C Benjamin (United States) T Mochizuki	1	2
(United States) R Blount (United States) K Latham	6	4	6
(United States) D Gilbert (Chile) G Ohaco	4	6	4
(Switzerland) K Stampfli (Switzerland) I Villiger	1	4
(United States) Penny Johnson (United States) Barbara Lemberg	6	6
(United States) Shannon Gordon (United States) J Harrington	w/o
2	(United Kingdom) A Hobbs (Australia) S Leo

Second round
7	(United States) D Desfor (United States) B Hallquist	6	6
(France) B Simon (France) F Thibault	2	1
(United States) J Davis (United States) H Ludloff	6	2
4	(Brazil) P Medrado (Brazil) C Monteiro	7	6
5	(Australia) D Fromholtz (United States) B Gadusek	6	6
(United States) R Blount (United States) K Latham	4	2
(United States) P Johnson (United States) B Lemberg	5	2
(United States) S Gordon (United States) J Harrington	7	6

Quarterfinals
7	(United States) D Desfor (United States) B Hallquist	6	4
4	(Brazil) P Medrado (Brazil) C Monteiro	7	6
5	(Australia) D Fromholtz (United States) B Gadusek	6	6
(United States) S Gordon (United States) J Harrington	3	2

Semifinals
4	(Brazil) P Medrado (Brazil) C Monteiro	6	6
5	(Australia) D Fromholtz (United States) B Gadusek	3	2
