= 1992 Mazda Tennis Classic – Singles =

Singles
- 1992 Mazda Tennis Classic

Final
- Champion: (United States) Jennifer Capriati
- Runner-up: (Spain) Conchita Martínez
- Score: 6–3, 6–2

Details
- Draw: 28 (2WC)
- Seeds: 8

Events
Singles	Doubles
- San Diego Open

Jennifer Capriati successfully defended her title by defeating Conchita Martínez 6–3, 6–2 in the final.

== Seeds ==
The top four seeds received a bye to the second round.

1. (Argentina) Gabriela Sabatini (quarterfinals)
2. (United States) Jennifer Capriati (champion)
3. (Spain) Conchita Martínez (final)
4. (Germany) Anke Huber (semifinals)
5. (Czechoslovakia) Jana Novotná (second round)
6. (France) Nathalie Tauziat (quarterfinals)
7. (United States) Zina Garrison (quarterfinals)
8. (Belgium) Sabine Appelmans (first round)

== Draw ==
Key

- Q = Qualifier
- WC = Wild card
- LL = Lucky loser
- Alt = Alternate
- ITF = ITF entry
- PR = Protected ranking
- SR = Special ranking
- SE = Special exempt
- JE = Junior exempt
- JR = Junior Accelerator Programme entrant
- CO = College Accelerator Programme entrant
- NG = Next Gen Accelerator Program entrant
- w/o = Walkover
- r = Retired
- d = Defaulted

=== Finals ===
Semifinals
(Commonwealth of Independent States) Leila Meskhi	6	6^{5}	2
3	(Spain) Conchita Martínez	3	7^{7}	6
4	(Germany) Anke Huber	6^{6}	6	1
2	(United States) Jennifer Capriati	7^{8}	3	6

Final
3	(Spain) Conchita Martínez	3	2
2	(United States) Jennifer Capriati	6	6

=== Top half ===
First round
WC	(United States) G Magers	3	4
(United States) K Po	6	6
(Japan) K Date	6	6
(United States) P Shriver	3	3
(Commonwealth of Independent States) L Meskhi	6	6
8	(Belgium) S Appelmans	4	1
(France) I Demongeot	7^{7}	6
(Czechoslovakia) A Strnadová	6^{5}	1
(United States) A Grossman	7^{7}	6
(United States) R White	6^{5}	3
(Sweden) C Linqdvist	3	3
5	(Czechoslovakia) J Novotná	6	6

Second round
1	(Argentina) G Sabatini	6	6
(United States) K Po	0	0
(Japan) K Date	2	3
(Commonwealth of Independent States) L Meskhi	6	6
3	(Spain) C Martínez	6	7
(France) I Demongeot	4	5
(United States) A Grossman	4	6	4
5	(Czechoslovakia) J Novotná	6	4	2^{r}

Quarterfinals
1	(Argentina) G Sabatini	0	3
(Commonwealth of Independent States) L Meskhi	6	6
3	(Spain) C Martínez	6	6
(United States) A Grossman	1	3

Semifinals
(Commonwealth of Independent States) L Meskhi	6	6^{5}	2
3	(Spain) C Martínez	3	7^{7}	6

=== Bottom half ===
First round
6	(France) N Tauziat	6	6
WC	(Mexico) A Gavaldón	1	3
(Argentina) M Paz	7^{7}	6^{5}	4
(United States) S Rehe	6^{5}	7^{7}	6
(United States) D Graham	6	6
(Indonesia) Y Basuki	0	3
7	(United States) Z Garrison	6	6
(South Africa) R Fairbank-Nideffer	3	2
(United Kingdom) M Javer	6	6
(United States) K Rinaldi	4	3
(Austria) J Wiesner	3	7^{8}	6
(France) J Halard	6	6^{6}	3

Second round
6	(France) N Tauziat	7	3	6
(United States) S Rehe	5	6	3
(United States) D Graham	0	2
4	(Germany) A Huber	6	6
7	(United States) Z Garrison	6	6
(United Kingdom) M Javer	1	0
(Austria) J Wiesner	4	1
2	(United States) J Capriati	6	6

Quarterfinals
6	(France) N Tauziat	1	1
4	(Germany) A Huber	6	6
7	(United States) Z Garrison	4	4
2	(United States) J Capriati	6	6

Semifinals
4	(Germany) A Huber	6^{6}	6	1
2	(United States) J Capriati	7^{8}	3	6
