= 1992 Mazda Tennis Classic – Doubles =

Doubles
- 1992 Mazda Tennis Classic

Final
- Champions: (Czechoslovakia) Jana Novotná (Latvia) Larisa Savchenko-Neiland
- Runners-up: (Spain) Conchita Martínez (Argentina) Mercedes Paz
- Score: 6–1, 6–4

Details
- Draw: 16
- Seeds: 4

Events
Singles	Doubles
- San Diego Open

Jill Hetherington and Kathy Rinaldi were the defending champions, but lost in the semifinals to Conchita Martínez and Mercedes Paz.

Jana Novotná and Larisa Savchenko-Neiland won the title by defeating Martínez and Paz 6–1, 6–4 in the final.

== Seeds ==
1. (Czechoslovakia) Jana Novotná / (Latvia) Larisa Savchenko-Neiland (champions)
2. (Spain) Conchita Martínez / (Argentina) Mercedes Paz (final)
3. (Canada) Jill Hetherington / (United States) Kathy Rinaldi (semifinals)
4. (United States) Zina Garrison / (United States) Robin White (semifinals)

== Draw ==
Key

- Q = Qualifier
- WC = Wild card
- LL = Lucky loser
- Alt = Alternate
- ITF = ITF entry
- PR = Protected ranking
- SR = Special ranking
- SE = Special exempt
- JE = Junior exempt
- JR = Junior Accelerator Programme entrant
- CO = College Accelerator Programme entrant
- NG = Next Gen Accelerator Program entrant
- w/o = Walkover
- r = Retired
- d = Defaulted

=== Draw ===
First round
1	(Czechoslovakia) J Novotná (Latvia) L Savchenko-Neiland	6	6
(South Africa) R Fairbank-Nideffer (South Africa) L Gregory	4	4
(South Africa) R Gaddie (South Africa) Toni Gaddie	1	6^{3}
(United States) Heidi Djanogly (United States) Jacqueline Geller	6	7^{7}
4	(United States) Z Garrison (United States) R White	6	6
(United States) Julie McKeon (United States) Laura Richards	4	2
(France) J Halard (Germany) A Huber	3	3
(United States) A Grossman (Sweden) C Lindqvist	6	6
(Belgium) S Appelmans (Austria) J Wiesner	7^{7}	6
(United States) D Graham (United States) K Po	6^{5}	2
(United States) P Harper (United States) G Magers	4	3
3	(Canada) J Hetherington (United States) K Rinaldi	6	6
(France) I Demongeot (France) N Tauziat	6	6
(Japan) K Date (Commonwealth of Independent States) L Meskhi	3	2
(United Kingdom) M Javer (Australia) L Pleming	1	1
2	(Spain) C Martínez (Argentina) M Paz	6	6

Quarterfinals
1	(Czechoslovakia) J Novotná (Latvia) L Savchenko-Neiland	6	6
(United States) H Djanogly (United States) J Geller	1	1
4	(United States) Z Garrison (United States) R White	6	6
(United States) A Grossman (Sweden) C Lindqvist	2	3
(Belgium) S Appelmans (Austria) J Wiesner	3	2
3	(Canada) J Hetherington (United States) K Rinaldi	6	6
(France) I Demongeot (France) N Tauziat	6^{6}	1
2	(Spain) C Martínez (Argentina) M Paz	7^{8}	6

Semifinals
1	(Czechoslovakia) J Novotná (Latvia) L Savchenko-Neiland	6	6
4	(United States) Z Garrison (United States) R White	2	4
3	(Canada) J Hetherington (United States) K Rinaldi	4	6	2
2	(Spain) C Martínez (Argentina) M Paz	6	3	6

Final
1	(Czechoslovakia) J Novotná (Latvia) L Savchenko-Neiland	6	6
2	(Spain) C Martínez (Argentina) M Paz	1	4
