= 2005 Acura Classic =

- Date: August 1– 7
- Edition: 27th
- Category: Tier I
- Draw: 56S / 24D
- Prize money: USD 1,300,000
- Surface: Hard / outdoor
- Location: San Diego, California, U.S.
- Venue: La Costa Resort and Spa

Champions

Singles
- (France) Mary Pierce

Doubles
- (Spain) Conchita Martínez / (Spain) Virginia Ruano Pascual
- Southern California Open

The 2005 Acura Classic was a women's tennis tournament played on outdoor hard courts at the La Costa Resort and Spa in San Diego, California, United States. It was part of Tier I of the 2005 WTA Tour. It was the 27th edition of the tournament and was held from July 26 through August 7, 2005. Sixth-seeded Mary Pierce won the singles title.

== Champions ==
=== Singles ===
(France) Mary Pierce defeated (Japan) Ai Sugiyama, 6–0, 6–3

- It was Pierce's 1st title of the year and the 17th of her career.

=== Doubles ===
(Spain) Conchita Martínez / (Spain) Virginia Ruano Pascual defeated (Slovakia) Daniela Hantuchová / (Japan) Ai Sugiyama, 6–7^{(7–9)}, 6–1, 7–5

- It was Martínez's 2nd title of the year and the 13th of her career. It was Ruano Pascual's 5th title of the year and the 34th of her career.
