= 1988 Virginia Slims of San Diego =

- Date: August 1–7
- Edition: 5th
- Category: Category 2
- Draw: 32S / 16D
- Prize money: $100,000
- Surface: Hard / outdoor
- Location: San Diego, California, U.S.
- Venue: San Diego Tennis & Racquet Club

Champions

Singles
- (United States) Stephanie Rehe

Doubles
- (United States) Patty Fendick / (Canada) Jill Hetherington
- Southern California Open

The 1988 Virginia Slims of San Diego was a women's tennis tournament played on outdoor hard courts at the San Diego Tennis & Racquet Club in San Diego, California, in the United States and was part of the Category 2 tier of the 1988 WTA Tour. The tournament ran from August 1 through August 7, 1988. Second-seeded Stephanie Rehe won the singles title and earned $17,000 first-prize money.

== Finals ==
=== Singles ===
(United States) Stephanie Rehe defeated (United States) Ann Grossman 6–1, 6–1

- It was Rehe's 2nd singles title of the year and the 5th and last of her career.

=== Doubles ===
(United States) Patty Fendick / (Canada) Jill Hetherington defeated (United States) Betsy Nagelsen / (South Africa) Dianne van Rensburg 7–6^{(12–10)}, 6–4

- It was Fendick's 6th title of the year and the 6th of her career. It was Hetherington's 4th title of the year and the 5th of her career.
