= 1990 Great American Bank Classic – Singles =

Singles
- 1990 Great American Bank Classic

Final
- Champion: (Germany) Steffi Graf
- Runner-up: (Switzerland) Manuela Maleeva-Fragnière
- Score: 6–3, 6–2

Details
- Draw: 32
- Seeds: 8

Events
Singles	Doubles
- San Diego Open

Steffi Graf successfully defended her title by defeating Manuela Maleeva-Fragnière 6–3, 6–2 in the final.

== Seeds ==
1. (Germany) Steffi Graf (champion)
2. (n/a)
3. (United States) Zina Garrison-Jackson (semifinals)
4. (Switzerland) Manuela Maleeva-Fragnière (final)
5. (France) Nathalie Tauziat (quarterfinals)
6. (Austria) Barbara Paulus (semifinals)
7. (United States) Gretchen Magers (first round)
8. (Italy) Raffaella Reggi (second round)

== Draw ==
Key

- Q = Qualifier
- WC = Wild card
- LL = Lucky loser
- Alt = Alternate
- ITF = ITF entry
- PR = Protected ranking
- SR = Special ranking
- SE = Special exempt
- JE = Junior exempt
- JR = Junior Accelerator Programme entrant
- CO = College Accelerator Programme entrant
- NG = Next Gen Accelerator Program entrant
- w/o = Walkover
- r = Retired
- d = Defaulted

=== Finals ===
Semifinals
1	(West Germany) Steffi Graf	6	7
3	(United States) Zina Garrison-Jackson	4	5
4	(Switzerland) Manuela Maleeva-Fragnière	6	4	6
6	(Austria) Barbara Paulus	0	6	1

Final
1	(West Germany) Steffi Graf	6	6
4	(Switzerland) Manuela Maleeva-Fragnière	3	2

=== Top half ===
First round
1	(West Germany) S Graf	6	6
(United States) S Rehe	0	3
(United States) K Rinaldi	6	6
(United States) L Allen	3	2
(United States) S Martin	6	6
(United States) H Ludloff	4	3
(United States) A Schwartz	1	2
5	(France) N Tauziat	6	6
3	(United States) Z Garrison-Jackson	6	6
(United States) G Fernández	2	2
(France) I Demongeot	6	2	2
(France) N Herreman	4	6	6
(Sweden) C Lindqvist	6	4	1
(Poland) R Baranski	0	6	6
(United States) T Phelps	3	6	6
7	(United States) G Magers	6	4	2

Second round
1	(West Germany) S Graf	6	6
(United States) K Rinaldi	3	4
(United States) S Martin	4	2
5	(France) N Tauziat	6	6
3	(United States) Z Garrison-Jackson	6	6
(France) N Herreman	2	1
(Poland) R Baranski	2	1
(United States) T Phelps	6	6

Quarterfinals
1	(West Germany) S Graf	6	6
5	(France) N Tauziat	3	2
3	(United States) Z Garrison-Jackson	6	6
(United States) T Phelps	0	3

Semifinals
1	(West Germany) S Graf	6	7
3	(United States) Z Garrison-Jackson	4	5

=== Bottom half ===
First round
8	(Italy) R Reggi	6	6
(South Africa) L Gregory	2	2
(United States) A Grossman	6	6
(United States) L McNeil	1	4
(United States) E Burgin	6	3
(United States) P Fendick	7	6
(United States) A May	4	6
4	(Switzerland) M Maleeva-Fragnière	6	7
6	(Austria) B Paulus	6	6
(United Kingdom) M Javer	3	1
(Hungary) A Temesvári-Trunkos	2	2
(West Germany) E Pfaff	6	6
(Mexico) A Gavaldón	7	6
(West Germany) C Porwik	5	4
(South Africa) R Fairbank-Nideffer	7	6
(United States) L Spadea	5	1

Second round
8	(Italy) R Reggi	2	6	1
(United States) A Grossman	6	2	6
(United States) P Fendick	1	2
4	(Switzerland) M Maleeva-Fragnière	6	6
6	(Austria) B Paulus	5	6	6
(West Germany) E Pfaff	7	2	2
(Mexico) A Gavaldón	6	5	0
(South Africa) R Fairbank-Nideffer	4	7	6

Quarterfinals
(United States) A Grossman	5	1
4	(Switzerland) M Maleeva-Fragnière	7	6
6	(Austria) B Paulus	7	6
(South Africa) R Fairbank-Nideffer	5	3

Semifinals
4	(Switzerland) M Maleeva-Fragnière	6	4	6
6	(Austria) B Paulus	0	6	1
