= 1994 Toshiba Classic – Singles =

Singles
- 1994 Toshiba Classic

Final
- Champion: (Germany) Steffi Graf
- Runner-up: (Spain) Arantxa Sánchez Vicario
- Score: 6–2, 6–1

Details
- Draw: 56 (3WC/8Q/1LL)
- Seeds: 16

Events
Singles	Doubles
- Southern California Open

Steffi Graf successfully defended her title, by defeating Arantxa Sánchez Vicario 6–2, 6–1 in the final.

== Seeds ==
The top eight seeds received a bye into the second round.

1. (Germany) Steffi Graf (champion)
2. (Spain) Arantxa Sánchez Vicario (final)
3. (Spain) Conchita Martínez (semifinals)
4. (United States) Lindsay Davenport (quarterfinals, withdrew)
5. (Czech Republic) Jana Novotná (quarterfinals)
6. (France) Julie Halard (quarterfinals)
7. (Belgium) Sabine Appelmans (third round)
8. (France) Nathalie Tauziat (second round)
9. (Croatia) Iva Majoli (third round)
10. (Ukraine) Natalia Medvedeva (third round)
11. (United States) Ginger Helgeson (third round)
12. (United States) Ann Grossman (third round)
13. (Germany) Marketa Kochta (first round)
14. (United States) Gigi Fernández (second round)
15. (United States) Marianne Werdel (third round)
16. (United States) Lisa Raymond (third round)

== Draw ==
Key

- Q = Qualifier
- WC = Wild card
- LL = Lucky loser
- Alt = Alternate
- ITF = ITF entry
- PR = Protected ranking
- SR = Special ranking
- SE = Special exempt
- JE = Junior exempt
- JR = Junior Accelerator Programme entrant
- CO = College Accelerator Programme entrant
- NG = Next Gen Accelerator Program entrant
- w/o = Walkover
- r = Retired
- d = Defaulted

=== Finals ===
Quarterfinals
1	(Germany) Steffi Graf	6	6^{6}	6
6	(France) Julie Halard	4	7^{8}	0
4	(United States) Lindsay Davenport
(United States) Tami Whitlinger-Jones	w/o
5	(Czech Republic) Jana Novotná	1	2
3	(Spain) Conchita Martínez	6	6
(Germany) Christina Singer	0	1
2	(Spain) Arantxa Sánchez Vicario	6	6

Semifinals
1	(Germany) Steffi Graf	6	6
(United States) Tami Whitlinger-Jones	3	4
3	(Spain) Conchita Martínez	4	1
2	(Spain) Arantxa Sánchez Vicario	6	6

Final
1	(Germany) Steffi Graf	6	6
2	(Spain) Arantxa Sánchez Vicario	2	1

=== Top half ===
==== Section 1 ====
First round
Q	(United States) S Reece	2	2
(France) A Dechaume-Balleret	6	6
(Czech Republic) A Strnadová	6	6
(Argentina) MJ Gaidano	4	2
(Australia) R Stubbs	5	6^{3}
16	(United States) L Raymond	7	7^{7}
10	(Ukraine) N Medvedeva	6	6
LL	(France) N Herreman	0	2
(United States) M Jackson-Nobrega	6	6
(United States) A Keller	4	3
(South Africa) T Price	4	1
(Kazakhstan) E Likhovtseva	6	6

Second round
1	(Germany) S Graf	6	6
(France) A Dechaume-Balleret	0	1
(Czech Republic) A Strnadová	3	1
16	(United States) L Raymond	6	6
10	(Ukraine) N Medvedeva	4	6	6
(United States) M Jackson-Nobrega	6	3	3
(Kazakhstan) E Likhovtseva	6	2	0
6	(France) J Halard	1	6	6

Third round
1	(Germany) S Graf	6^{8}	6	6
16	(United States) L Raymond	7^{10}	2	2
10	(Ukraine) N Medvedeva	2	3
6	(France) J Halard	6	6

Quarterfinals
1	(Germany) S Graf	6	6^{6}	6
6	(France) J Halard	4	7^{8}	0

==== Section 2 ====
First round
(Netherlands) S Rottier	6	6
(Italy) Ad Serra Zanetti	1	1
WC	(United States) R White	4	7^{7}	3
(Italy) R Grande	6	6^{2}	6
(United States) C Cunningham	3	1
12	(United States) A Grossman	6	6
14	(United States) G Fernández	6	6
(Italy) L Golarsa	4	2
Q	(United States) E deLone	6	5	4
(Mexico) A Gavaldón	2	7	6
(Australia) J Byrne	6	3	1
(United States) T Whitlinger-Jones	4	6	6

Second round
4	(United States) L Davenport	6	6
(Netherlands) S Rottier	2	3
(Italy) R Grande	3	1
12	(United States) A Grossman	6	6
14	(United States) G Fernández	4	7^{7}	4
(Mexico) A Gavaldón	6	6^{5}	6
(United States) T Whitlinger-Jones	6	4	6
8	(France) N Tauziat	4	6	4

Third round
4	(United States) L Davenport	6	6
12	(United States) A Grossman	1	2
(Mexico) A Gavaldón	2	0^{r}
(United States) T Whitlinger-Jones	6	3

Quarterfinals
4	(United States) L Davenport
(United States) T Whitlinger-Jones	w/o

=== Bottom half ===
==== Section 3 ====
First round
(Canada) R Simpson-Alter	2	6	5
(Australia) R McQuillan	6	3	7
(Japan) R Hiraki	5	5
WC	(United Kingdom) J Durie	7	7
(Czech Republic) E Martincová	6^{2}	1
9	(Croatia) I Majoli	7^{7}	6
11	(United States) G Helgeson	6	6
(France) K Quentrec	3	1
(United States) A Henricksson	6	5	7
Q	(Germany) S Fortun-Lohrmann	3	7	5
Q	(United States) A Creek	3	5
(Italy) N Baudone	6	7

Second round
5	(Czech Republic) J Novotná	6	6
(Australia) R McQuillan	4	2
WC	(United Kingdom) J Durie	2	6	5
9	(Croatia) I Majoli	6	2	7
11	(United States) G Helgeson	6	7
(United States) A Henricksson	0	5
(Italy) N Baudone	0	4
3	(Spain) C Martínez	6	6

Third round
5	(Czech Republic) J Novotná	6	6
9	(Croatia) I Majoli	0	1
11	(United States) G Helgeson	4	3
3	(Spain) C Martínez	6	6

Quarterfinals
5	(Czech Republic) J Novotná	1	2
3	(Spain) C Martínez	6	6

==== Section 4 ====
First round
Q	(Venezuela) MA Vento	6	2	6
Q	(Canada) S Jeyaseelan	4	6	3
(Germany) C Singer	6	1	6
(Argentina) P Suárez	4	6	3
Q	(Canada) J Nejedly	6	5	6
13	(Germany) M Kochta	3	7	3
15	(United States) M Werdel	4	6	6
WC	(United States) S Collins	6	4	2
(United States) J Watanabe	4	6	6
Q	(Japan) H Nagano	6	2	3
(France) S Testud	6	6
(Germany) K Kschwendt	1	2

Second round
7	(Belgium) S Appelmans	6	6
Q	(Venezuela) MA Vento	4	2
(Germany) C Singer	2	6	6
Q	(Canada) J Nejedly	6	4	4
15	(United States) M Werdel	7^{7}	2	7
(United States) J Watanabe	6^{3}	6	5
(France) S Testud	1	3
2	(Spain) A Sánchez Vicario	6	6

Third round
7	(Belgium) S Appelmans	4	0
(Germany) C Singer	6	6
15	(United States) M Werdel	6	4	4
2	(Spain) A Sánchez Vicario	0	6	6

Quarterfinals
(Germany) C Singer	0	1
2	(Spain) A Sánchez Vicario	6	6
