= 1994 Toshiba Classic – Doubles =

Doubles
- 1994 Toshiba Classic

Final
- Champions: (Czech Republic) Jana Novotná (Spain) Arantxa Sánchez Vicario
- Runners-up: (United States) Ginger Helgeson (Australia) Rachel McQuillan
- Score: 6–3, 6–3

Details
- Draw: 28 (2WC/1Q)
- Seeds: 8

Events
Singles	Doubles
- Southern California Open

Gigi Fernández and Helena Suková were the defending champions, but Suková did not compete this year. Fernández teamed up with Rennae Stubbs and lost in the quarterfinals to Jill Hetherington and Shaun Stafford.

Jana Novotná and Arantxa Sánchez Vicario won the title by defeating Ginger Helgeson and Rachel McQuillan 6–3, 6–3 in the final.

== Seeds ==
The top four seeds received a bye into the second round.

1. (Czech Republic) Jana Novotná / (Spain) Arantxa Sánchez Vicario (champions)
2. (United States) Gigi Fernández / (Australia) Rennae Stubbs (quarterfinals)
3. (United States) Lindsay Davenport / (United States) Lisa Raymond (Second round, withdrew)
4. (France) Julie Halard / (France) Nathalie Tauziat (second round)
5. (Spain) Conchita Martínez / (Argentina) Patricia Tarabini (quarterfinals)
6. (Canada) Jill Hetherington / (United States) Shaun Stafford (semifinals)
7. (Belgium) Sabine Appelmans / (Ukraine) Natalia Medvedeva (first round)
8. (United States) Ginger Helgeson / (Australia) Rachel McQuillan (final)

== Draw ==
Key

- Q = Qualifier
- WC = Wild card
- LL = Lucky loser
- Alt = Alternate
- ITF = ITF entry
- PR = Protected ranking
- SR = Special ranking
- SE = Special exempt
- JE = Junior exempt
- JR = Junior Accelerator Programme entrant
- CO = College Accelerator Programme entrant
- NG = Next Gen Accelerator Program entrant
- w/o = Walkover
- r = Retired
- d = Defaulted

=== Finals ===
Semifinals
1	(Czech Republic) Jana Novotná (Spain) Arantxa Sánchez Vicario	6	7
(France) Alexia Dechaume-Balleret (Italy) Laura Golarsa	4	5
8	(United States) Ginger Helgeson (Australia) Rachel McQuillan	3	6	6
6	(Canada) Jill Hetherington (United States) Shaun Stafford	6	3	3

Final
1	(Czech Republic) Jana Novotná (Spain) Arantxa Sánchez Vicario	6	6
8	(United States) Ginger Helgeson (Australia) Rachel McQuillan	3	3

=== Top half ===
First round
(United States) A Keller (Canada) R Simpson-Alter	6	6
(United States) S Collins (United Kingdom) J Durie	1	4
WC	(Germany) S Graf (United States) P Shriver	6	6
(Kazakhstan) E Likhovtseva (United States) S Reece	3	3
(United States) E deLone (Australia) N Pratt	3	0
5	(Spain) C Martínez (Argentina) P Tarabini	6	6
(Canada) C Delisle (Australia) D Jones	4	1
(France) A Dechaume-Balleret (Italy) L Golarsa	6	6
Q	(Georgia (country)) N Louarsabishvili (United Kingdom) J Pullin	5	3
(Japan) R Hiraki (South Africa) T Price	7	6
WC	(Mexico) A Gavaldón (Australia) L Pleming	2	6	7
7	(Belgium) S Appelmans (Ukraine) N Medvedeva	6	2	5

Second round
1	(Czech Republic) J Novotná (Spain) A Sánchez Vicario	6	6
(United States) A Keller (Canada) R Simpson-Alter	2	4
WC	(Germany) S Graf (United States) P Shriver	3	4
5	(Spain) C Martínez (Argentina) P Tarabini	6	6
3	(United States) L Davenport (United States) L Raymond
(France) A Dechaume-Balleret (Italy) L Golarsa	w/o
(Japan) R Hiraki (South Africa) T Price	6	6
WC	(Mexico) A Gavaldón (Australia) L Pleming	2	4

Quarterfinals
1	(Czech Republic) J Novotná (Spain) A Sánchez Vicario	6	7^{7}
5	(Spain) C Martínez (Argentina) P Tarabini	3	6^{4}
(France) A Dechaume-Balleret (Italy) L Golarsa	6	7
(Japan) R Hiraki (South Africa) T Price	2	5

Semifinals
1	(Czech Republic) J Novotná (Spain) A Sánchez Vicario	6	7
(France) A Dechaume-Balleret (Italy) L Golarsa	4	5

=== Bottom half ===
First round
8	(United States) G Helgeson (Australia) R McQuillan	6	6
(France) K Quentrec (France) S Testud	0	1
(United Kingdom) V Lake (United States) M Werdel	7^{7}	6
(Italy) R Grande (Czech Republic) E Martincová	6^{5}	0
(United States) C Benjamin (United States) M Jackson-Nobrega	4	4
(Australia) J Byrne (United States) R White	6	6
6	(Canada) J Hetherington (United States) S Stafford	7^{7}	6
(United States) P Harper (United States) A Leand	6^{4}	1
(Germany) K Kschwendt (Czech Republic) A Strnadová	4	3
(United States) S McCarthy (Germany) C Singer	6	6
(United States) A Grossman (Croatia) I Majoli	6	6
(Venezuela) M Mazzotta (Japan) H Nagano	3	2

Second round
8	(United States) G Helgeson (Australia) R McQuillan	6	6
(United Kingdom) V Lake (United States) M Werdel	3	4
(Australia) J Byrne (United States) R White	6^{5}	7^{7}	6
4	(France) J Halard (France) N Tauziat	7^{7}	6^{3}	1
6	(Canada) J Hetherington (United States) S Stafford	6	6
(United States) S McCarthy (Germany) C Singer	1	1
(United States) A Grossman (Croatia) I Majoli	2	4
2	(United States) G Fernández (Australia) R Stubbs	6	6

Quarterfinals
8	(United States) G Helgeson (Australia) R McQuillan	6	6
(Australia) J Byrne (United States) R White	4	4
6	(Canada) J Hetherington (United States) S Stafford	4	6	6
2	(United States) G Fernández (Australia) R Stubbs	6	3	2

Semifinals
8	(United States) G Helgeson (Australia) R McQuillan	3	6	6
6	(Canada) J Hetherington (United States) S Stafford	6	3	3
