= 1989 Great American Bank Classic =

- Date: July 31 – August 6
- Edition: 11th
- Category: Category 3
- Draw: 32S / 16D
- Prize money: $200,000
- Surface: Hard / outdoor
- Location: San Diego, California, U.S.
- Venue: San Diego Tennis & Racquet Club

Champions

Singles
- (West Germany) Steffi Graf

Doubles
- (United States) Elise Burgin / (South Africa) Rosalyn Fairbank
- Southern California Open

The 1989 Great American Bank Classic was a women's tennis tournament played on outdoor hard courts at the San Diego Tennis & Racquet Club in San Diego, California–in the United States that was part of the Category 3 tier of the 1989 WTA Tour. The tournament was held from July 31 through August 6, 1989. First-seeded Steffi Graf won the singles title.

The tournament's purse doubled to $200,000 in 1989, when the sponsor changed to San Diego–based Great American Bank from Virginia Slims, a cigarette brand owned by Philip Morris.

== Finals ==
=== Singles ===
(West Germany) Steffi Graf defeated (United States) Zina Garrison 6–4, 7–5

- It was Graf's 9th singles title of the year and the 39th of her career.

=== Doubles ===
(United States) Elise Burgin / (South Africa) Rosalyn Fairbank defeated (United States) Gretchen Magers / (United States) Robin White 4–6, 6–3, 6–3

- It was Burgin's only title of the year and the 10th of her career. It was Fairbank's only title of the year and the 1st of her career.
