= 1998 Toshiba Classic =

- Date: August 3– 9
- Edition: 20th
- Category: Tier II
- Draw: 28S / 16D
- Prize money: $450,000
- Surface: Hard / outdoor
- Location: San Diego, California, U.S.
- Venue: La Costa Resort and Spa

Champions

Singles
- (United States) Lindsay Davenport

Doubles
- (United States) Lindsay Davenport (Belarus) Natasha Zvereva
- Southern California Open

The 1998 Toshiba Classic was a women's tennis tournament played on outdoor hard courts at the La Costa Resort and Spa in San Diego, California, United States, that was part of Tier II of the 1998 WTA Tour. It was the 20th edition of the tournament and was held from August 3 through August 9, 1998. Second-seeded Lindsay Davenport won the singles title and earned $79,000 first-prize money.

== Finals ==
=== Singles ===
(United States) Lindsay Davenport defeated (France) Mary Pierce 6–3, 6–1

- It was Davenport's 3rd singles title of the year and the 16th of her career.

=== Doubles ===
(United States) Lindsay Davenport / (Belarus) Natasha Zvereva defeated (France) Alexandra Fusai / (France) Nathalie Tauziat 6–2, 6–1

- It was Davenport's 7th title of the year and the 38th of her career. It was Zvereva's 4th title of the year and the 77th of her career.
