= 1990 Great American Bank Classic – Doubles =

Doubles
- 1990 Great American Bank Classic

Final
- Champions: (United States) Patty Fendick (United States) Zina Garrison-Jackson
- Runners-up: (United States) Elise Burgin (South Africa) Rosalyn Fairbank-Nideffer
- Score: 6–4, 7–6^{(7–5)}

Details
- Draw: 16
- Seeds: 4

Events
Singles	Doubles
- San Diego Open

Elise Burgin and Rosalyn Fairbank-Nideffer were the defending champions, but lost in the final to Patty Fendick and Zina Garrison-Jackson. The score was 6–4, 7–6^{(7–5)}.

== Seeds ==
1. (n/a)
2. (United States) Patty Fendick / (United States) Zina Garrison-Jackson (champions)
3. (South Africa) Lise Gregory / (United States) Gretchen Magers (semifinals)
4. (United States) Elise Burgin / (South Africa) Rosalyn Fairbank-Nideffer (final)

== Draw ==
Key

- Q = Qualifier
- WC = Wild card
- LL = Lucky loser
- Alt = Alternate
- ITF = ITF entry
- PR = Protected ranking
- SR = Special ranking
- SE = Special exempt
- JE = Junior exempt
- JR = Junior Accelerator Programme entrant
- CO = College Accelerator Programme entrant
- NG = Next Gen Accelerator Program entrant
- w/o = Walkover
- r = Retired
- d = Defaulted

=== Draw ===
First round
(United Kingdom) M Javer (United States) L Spadea	6	6
(United States) H Ludloff (United States) A May	3	3
(Sweden) C Lindqvist (Italy) R Reggi	3	6	7
(Austria) B Paulus (France) N Tauziat	6	4	5
4	(United States) E Burgin (South Africa) R Fairbank-Nideffer	7	6
(United States) P Mager (United States) T Phelps	6	3
(United States) L Antonoplis (United States) A Grossman	3	3
(Mexico) A Gavaldón (United States) S Rehe	6	6
(Poland) R Baranski (United States) Ca MacGregor	5	0
(France) I Demongeot (West Germany) C Porwik	7	6
(France) N Herreman (West Germany) E Pfaff	2	6
3	(South Africa) L Gregory (United States) G Magers	6	7
(United States) L Allen (France) S Amiach	2	1
(Switzerland) M Maleeva-Fragnière (United States) L McNeil	6	6
(United States) K Rinaldi (Hungary) A Temesvári-Trunkos	0	1
2	(United States) P Fendick (United States) Z Garrison-Jackson	6	6

Quarterfinals
(United Kingdom) M Javer (United States) L Spadea	4	4
(Sweden) C Lindqvist (Italy) R Reggi	6	6
4	(United States) E Burgin (South Africa) R Fairbank-Nideffer	6	7
(Mexico) A Gavaldón (United States) S Rehe	3	6
(France) I Demongeot (West Germany) C Porwik	4	6
3	(South Africa) L Gregory (United States) G Magers	6	7
(Switzerland) M Maleeva-Fragnière (United States) L McNeil	6	6	4
2	(United States) P Fendick (United States) Z Garrison-Jackson	3	7	6

Semifinals
(Sweden) C Lindqvist (Italy) R Reggi	3	4
4	(United States) E Burgin (South Africa) R Fairbank-Nideffer	6	6
3	(South Africa) L Gregory (United States) G Magers	3	6	4
2	(United States) P Fendick (United States) Z Garrison-Jackson	6	2	6

Final
4	(United States) E Burgin (South Africa) R Fairbank-Nideffer	4	6^{5}
2	(United States) P Fendick (United States) Z Garrison-Jackson	6	7^{7}
