= 1985 Virginia Slims of San Diego =

- Date: April 22–28
- Edition: 7th
- Draw: 32S / 16D
- Prize money: $75,000
- Surface: Hard / outdoor
- Location: San Diego, California U.S.
- Venue: San Diego Hilton Beach & Tennis Resort

Champions

Singles
- (United Kingdom) Annabel Croft

Doubles
- (United States) Candy Reynolds / (Australia) Wendy Turnbull
- Southern California Open

The 1985 Virginia Slims of San Diego was a women's tennis tournament played on outdoor hard courts at the San Diego Hilton Beach & Tennis Resort in San Diego, California in the United States that was part of the 1985 Virginia Slims World Championship Series. It was the seventh edition of the tournament and was held from April 22 through April 28, 1985. Unseeded Annabel Croft won the singles title.

== Finals ==
=== Singles ===
(United Kingdom) Annabel Croft defeated (Australia) Wendy Turnbull 6–0, 7–6^{(7–5)}

- It was Croft's only singles title of her career.

=== Doubles ===
(United States) Candy Reynolds / (Australia) Wendy Turnbull defeated (South Africa) Rosalyn Fairbank / (Australia) Susan Leo 6–4, 6–0
