= 1992 Mazda Tennis Classic =

- Date: August 24–30
- Edition: 14th
- Category: Tier III
- Draw: 28S / 16D
- Prize money: $225,000
- Surface: Hard / outdoor
- Location: San Diego, California, U.S.
- Venue: La Costa Resort and Spa

Champions

Singles
- (United States) Jennifer Capriati

Doubles
- (Czechoslovakia) Jana Novotná / (Latvia) Larisa Savchenko-Neiland
- San Diego Open

The 1992 Mazda Classic was a women's tennis tournament played on outdoor hard courts at the La Costa Resort and Spa in San Diego, California in the United States that was part of Tier III of the 1992 WTA Tour. It was the 14th edition of the tournament and was held from August 24 through August 30, 1992. Second-seeded Jennifer Capriati won the singles title and earned $45,000 first-prize money.

== Finals ==
=== Singles ===
(United States) Jennifer Capriati defeated (Spain) Conchita Martínez, 6–3, 6–2

=== Doubles ===
(Czechoslovakia) Jana Novotná / (Latvia) Larisa Savchenko-Neiland defeated (Spain) Conchita Martínez / (Argentina) Mercedes Paz, 6–1, 6–4
