= 2026 San Diego Open =

- Date: 27 January – 1 February
- Edition: 2nd
- Surface: Hard
- Location: San Diego, United States

Champions

Men's singles
- (United States) Zachary Svajda

Women's singles
- (United States) Elvina Kalieva

Men's doubles
- (United States) Trey Hilderbrand / (United States) Mac Kiger

Women's doubles
- (Canada) Kayla Cross / (United States) Alana Smith
- San Diego Open

The 2026 Better Buzz Coffee San Diego Open was a professional tennis tournament played on hardcourts. It was the second edition of the tournament as an ATP Challenger Tour event which was part of the 2026 ATP Challenger Tour. It was also the first edition of the tournament as part of the 2026 ITF Women's World Tennis Tour. It took place in San Diego, United States from 27 January to 1 February 2026.

== Men's singles main-draw entrants ==
=== Seeds ===
| Country | Player | Rank^{1} | Seed |
|---|---|---|---|
| USA | Sebastian Korda | 53 | 1 |
| AUS | Rinky Hijikata | 114 | 2 |
| USA | Patrick Kypson | 116 | 3 |
| USA | Zachary Svajda | 143 | 4 |
| JPN | Sho Shimabukuro | 144 | 5 |
| CAN | Liam Draxl | 145 | 6 |
| USA | Colton Smith | 148 | 7 |
| USA | Tristan Boyer | 181 | 8 |

- ^{1} Rankings are as of 19 January 2026.

=== Other entrants ===
The following players received wildcards into the singles main draw:

- (United States) Sebastian Korda
- (United States) Colton Smith

The following players received entry into the singles main draw as alternates:

- (Jamaica) Blaise Bicknell
- (United States) Micah Braswell
- (France) Raphael Perot
- (United States) Keegan Smith

The following players received entry from the qualifying draw:

- (Slovenia) Bor Artnak
- (United States) Felix Corwin
- (United States) Stefan Dostanic
- (Poland) Fryderyk Lechno-Wasiutyński
- (United States) Karl Poling
- (United States) Evan Zhu

== Women's singles main draw entrants ==
=== Seeds ===
| Country | Player | Rank^{1} | Seed |
|---|---|---|---|
| USA | Louisa Chirico | 178 | 1 |
| USA | Elizabeth Mandlik | 182 | 2 |
| CAN | Cadence Brace | 187 | 3 |
| CAN | Kayla Cross | 200 | 4 |
| USA | Elvina Kalieva | 207 | 5 |
| USA | Mary Stoiana | 222 | 6 |
| NED | Arianne Hartono | 256 | 7 |
| USA | Kayla Day | 257 | 8 |

- ^{1} Rankings are as of 19 January 2026.

=== Other entrants ===
The following players received wildcards into the singles main draw:

- (United States) Jennifer Brady
- (United States) Katherine Hui
- (United States) Alexis Nguyen

The following player received entry into the singles main draw using a special ranking:

- (United States) Kayla Day
- (United States) Catherine Harrison

The following players received entry from the qualifying draw:

- (Bosnia and Herzegovina) Ema Burgić
- (United States) Jo-yee Chan
- (United States) Kylie Collins
- (Poland) Gina Feistel
- (Israel) Lina Glushko
- Kristina Liutova
- (United States) Ava Markham
- (United Kingdom) Ella McDonald

== Champions ==
=== Men's singles ===
- (United States) Zachary Svajda def. (United States) Sebastian Korda 6–4, 7–6^{(7–5)}.

=== Men's doubles ===
- (United States) Trey Hilderbrand / (United States) Mac Kiger def. (United States) Garrett Johns / (United States) Karl Poling 6–3, 6–4.

=== Women's singles ===
- (United States) Elvina Kalieva def. (United States) Elizabeth Mandlik 3–6, 6–3, 6–1.

=== Women's doubles ===
- (Canada) Kayla Cross / (United States) Alana Smith def. (United States) Catherine Harrison / (United States) Dalayna Hewitt 6–2, 6–3.
