= 1989 Great American Bank Classic – Doubles =

Doubles
- 1989 Great American Bank Classic
- 1988 Champions: (United States) Patty Fendick (Canada) Jill Hetherington

Final
- Champions: (United States) Elise Burgin (South Africa) Rosalyn Fairbank
- Runners-up: (United States) Gretchen Magers (United States) Robin White
- Score: 4–6, 6–3, 6–3

Details
- Draw: 16
- Seeds: 4

Events
Singles	Doubles
- Great American Bank Classic

Patty Fendick and Jill Hetherington were the defending champions but lost in the quarterfinals to Gretchen Magers and Robin White.

Elise Burgin and Rosalyn Fairbank won in the final 4–6, 6–3, 6–3 against Magers and White.

== Seeds ==
Champion seeds are indicated in bold text while text in italics indicates the round in which those seeds were eliminated.

1. (United States) Patty Fendick / (Canada) Jill Hetherington (quarterfinals)
2. (United States) Betsy Nagelsen / (United States) Pam Shriver (first round)
3. (United States) Gigi Fernández / (United States) Lori McNeil (semifinals)
4. (France) Isabelle Demongeot / (France) Nathalie Tauziat (semifinals)

== Draw ==
Key

- Q = Qualifier
- WC = Wild card
- LL = Lucky loser
- Alt = Alternate
- ITF = ITF entry
- PR = Protected ranking
- SR = Special ranking
- SE = Special exempt
- JE = Junior exempt
- JR = Junior Accelerator Programme entrant
- CO = College Accelerator Programme entrant
- NG = Next Gen Accelerator Program entrant
- w/o = Walkover
- r = Retired
- d = Defaulted

First round
1	(United States) **P Fendick** (Canada) **J Hetherington**	**7**	**6**
(United States) M L Daniels (United States) W White	6	4
(United States) **G Magers** (United States) **R White**	**6**	**6**
(United States) L Antonoplis (United States) B Gerken	1	2
3	(United States) **G Fernández** (United States) **L McNeil**	**6**	**7**
(West Germany) B Bunge (West Germany) C Kohde-Kilsch	3	5
(West Germany) **E Pfaff** (United States) **T Phelps**	**6**	**7**
(United States) C Benjamin (France) P Paradis	2	5
(United States) M Louie-Harper (United States) J Smoller	3	**6**	4
(United States) **A May** (United States) **K Po**	**6**	2	**6**
(United States) R Casals (Hungary) A Temesvári	1	3
4	(France) **I Demongeot** (France) **N Tauziat**	**6**	**6**
(United States) **E Burgin** (South Africa) **R Fairbank**	**6**	**7**
(Australia) J Byrne (United Kingdom) J Durie	2	6
(United States) **K Jordan** (Australia) **E Smylie**	**6**	**7**
2	(United States) B Nagelsen (United States) P Shriver	4	6

Quarterfinals
1	(United States) P Fendick (Canada) J Hetherington	6	5
(United States) **G Magers** (United States) **R White**	**7**	**7**
3	(United States) **G Fernández** (United States) **L McNeil**	**6**	**6**
(West Germany) E Pfaff (United States) T Phelps	2	1
(United States) A May (United States) K Po	6	1
4	(France) **I Demongeot** (France) **N Tauziat**	**7**	**6**
(United States) **E Burgin** (South Africa) **R Fairbank**	**7**	**7**
(United States) K Jordan (Australia) E Smylie	6	6

Semifinals
(United States) **G Magers** (United States) **R White**	**7**	**6**
3	(United States) G Fernández (United States) L McNeil	6	1
4	(France) I Demongeot (France) N Tauziat	6	**6**	1
(United States) **E Burgin** (South Africa) **R Fairbank**	**7**	3	**6**

Final
(United States) Gretchen Magers (United States) Robin White	**6**	3	3
(United States) **Elise Burgin** (South Africa) **Rosalyn Fairbank**	4	**6**	**6**
