= 1979 Wells Fargo Open =

Women's tennis tournament

- Date: July 30 – August 5
- Edition: 2nd
- Category: Colgate Series (AA)
- Draw: 32S / 16D
- Prize money: $75,000
- Surface: Hard (Sporteze) / indoor
- Location: San Diego, California U.S.
- Venue: San Diego Sports Arena

Champions

Singles
- (United States) Tracy Austin

Doubles
- (United States) Rosie Casals / (United States) Martina Navratilova
- Southern California Open

The 1979 Wells Fargo Open was a women's tennis tournament played on indoor hard courts at the San Diego Sports Arena in San Diego, California in the United States that was part of the Colgate Series of the 1979 WTA Tour. It was the second edition of the tournament and was held from July 30 through August 5, 1979. First-seeded Tracy Austin won the singles title and earned $14,000 first-prize money.

== Finals ==
=== Singles ===
(United States) Tracy Austin defeated (United States) Martina Navratilova 6–4, 6–2

- It was Austin's 4th singles title of the year and the 7th of her career.

=== Doubles ===
(United States) Rosie Casals / (United States) Martina Navratilova defeated (United States) Ann Kiyomura / (United States) Betty-Ann Stuart 3–6, 6–4, 6–2

== Prize money ==
Event	W	F	3rd	4th	QF	Round of 16	Round of 32
Singles	$14,000	$7,000	$3,800	$3,400	$1,800	$950	$450
