= 1990 Great American Bank Classic =

- Date: August 6–12
- Edition: 13th
- Category: Tier III
- Draw: 32S / 16D
- Prize money: $225,000
- Surface: Hard / outdoor
- Location: San Diego, California, U.S.

Champions

Singles
- (Germany) Steffi Graf

Doubles
- (United States) Patty Fendick / (United States) Zina Garrison-Jackson
- San Diego Open

The 1990 Great American Bank Classic was a women's tennis tournament played on outdoor hard courts in San Diego, California, United States, that was part of the Tier III category of the 1990 WTA Tour. It was the 13th edition of the tournament and was held from August 6 through August 12, 1990. First-seeded Steffi Graf won the singles title.

== Finals ==
=== Singles ===
(West Germany) Steffi Graf defeated (Switzerland) Manuela Maleeva-Fragnière 6–3, 6–2.

- It was Graf's 6th singles title of the year and the 50th of her career.

=== Doubles ===
(United States) Patty Fendick / (United States) Zina Garrison-Jackson defeated (United States) Elise Burgin / (South Africa) Rosalyn Fairbank-Nideffer 6–4, 7–6^{(7–5)}.
