= 1989 Great American Bank Classic – Singles =

Singles
- 1989 Great American Bank Classic

Final
- Champion: (West Germany) Steffi Graf
- Runner-up: (United States) Zina Garrison
- Score: 6–4, 7–5

Details
- Draw: 32
- Seeds: 8

Events
Singles	Doubles
- Great American Bank Classic

Stephanie Rehe was the defending champion but did not compete that year.

Steffi Graf won in the final 6–4, 7–5 against Zina Garrison.

== Seeds ==
A champion seed is indicated in bold text while text in italics indicates the round in which that seed was eliminated.

1. (West Germany) **Steffi Graf (champion)**
2. (United States) Zina Garrison (final)
3. (United States) Susan Sloane (first round)
4. (United States) Patty Fendick (second round)
5. (United States) Lori McNeil (first round)
6. (France) Nathalie Tauziat (semifinals)
7. (West Germany) Claudia Kohde-Kilsch (quarterfinals)
8. (South Africa) Rosalyn Fairbank (first round)

== Draw ==
Key

- Q = Qualifier
- WC = Wild card
- LL = Lucky loser
- Alt = Alternate
- ITF = ITF entry
- PR = Protected ranking
- SR = Special ranking
- SE = Special exempt
- JE = Junior exempt
- JR = Junior Accelerator Programme entrant
- CO = College Accelerator Programme entrant
- NG = Next Gen Accelerator Program entrant
- w/o = Walkover
- r = Retired
- d = Defaulted

First round
1	(West Germany) **S Graf**	**6**	**6**
(Canada) R Simpson	0	0
(Australia) E Smylie	5	**6**	3
(United States) **B Nagelsen**	**7**	4	**6**
(France) **I Demongeot**	5	**6**	**6**
(United Kingdom) S Gomer	**7**	2	1
(United States) E Burgin	1	**6**	5
7	(West Germany) **C Kohde-Kilsch**	**6**	3	**7**
4	(United States) **P Fendick**	**6**	**6**
Q	(United States) L Harvey-Wild	4	1
(United States) **A Grossman**	**6**	**6**
(West Germany) E Pfaff	3	1
(United Kingdom) **J Durie**	**6**	**6**
(United States) R Casals	4	2
(West Germany) **B Bunge**	**6**	**6**
5	(United States) L McNeil	2	3
6	(France) **N Tauziat**	**6**	**7**
Q	(United States) G Helgeson	2	6
(United States) H Cioffi	**7**	1	2
(United States) **G Fernández**	5	**6**	**6**
Q	(United States) L Green	**6**	3	6
Q	(United States) **W White**	3	**6**	**7**
(United States) **R White**	**7**	**6**
3	(United States) S Sloane	5	3
8	(South Africa) R Fairbank	**6**	4	3
(Mexico) **A Gavaldón**	2	**6**	**6**
(France) P Paradis	1	5
(United States) **G Magers**	**6**	**7**
(Hungary) A Temesvári	2	6
(United States) **T Phelps**	**6**	**7**
(Australia) J Byrne	1	5
2	(United States) **Z Garrison**	**6**	**7**

Second round
1	(West Germany) **S Graf**	**6**	**6**
(United States) B Nagelsen	1	1
(France) I Demongeot	1	**6**	1
7	(West Germany) **C Kohde-Kilsch**	**6**	3	**6**
4	(United States) P Fendick	**6**	5	0
(United States) **A Grossman**	3	**7**	**6**
(United Kingdom) J Durie	1	1
(West Germany) **B Bunge**	**6**	**6**
6	(France) **N Tauziat**	**6**	1	**6**
(United States) G Fernández	3	**6**	1
Q	(United States) W White	3	4
(United States) **R White**	**6**	**6**
(Mexico) A Gavaldón	2	5
(United States) **G Magers**	**6**	**7**
(United States) T Phelps	5	**7**	0
2	(United States) **Z Garrison**	**7**	6	**6**

Quarterfinals
1	(West Germany) **S Graf**	**6**	**6**
7	(West Germany) C Kohde-Kilsch	0	0
(United States) A Grossman	**6**	5	4
(West Germany) **B Bunge**	2	**7**	**6**
6	(France) **N Tauziat**	4	**6**	**7**
(United States) R White	**6**	1	6
(United States) G Magers	4	5
2	(United States) **Z Garrison**	**6**	**7**

Semifinals
1	(West Germany) **S Graf**	**6**	**6**
(West Germany) B Bunge	1	2
6	(France) N Tauziat	1	5
2	(United States) **Z Garrison**	**6**	**7**

Final
1	(West Germany) **Steffi Graf**	**6**	**7**
2	(United States) Zina Garrison	4	5
