= 1980 Wells Fargo Open =

- Date: July 28 – August 3
- Edition: 3rd
- Category: Colgate Series (AA)
- Draw: 32S / 16D
- Prize money: $100,000
- Surface: Hard (Sporteze) / indoor
- Location: San Diego, California U.S.
- Venue: San Diego Sports Arena

Champions

Singles
- (United States) Tracy Austin

Doubles
- (United States) Tracy Austin / (United States) Ann Kiyomura
- Southern California Open

The 1980 Wells Fargo Open was a women's tennis tournament played on indoor hard courts at the San Diego Sports Arena in San Diego, California, United States, that was part of the Colgate Series of the 1980 WTA Tour. It was the third edition of the tournament and was held from July 28 through August 3, 1980. First-seeded Tracy Austin won the singles title, her second consecutive at the event, and earned $20,000 first-prize money.

== Finals ==
=== Singles ===
(United States) Tracy Austin defeated (Australia) Wendy Turnbull 6–1, 6–3

- It was Austin's 8th singles title of the year and the 18th of her career.

=== Doubles ===
(United States) Tracy Austin / (United States) Ann Kiyomura defeated (United States) Rosie Casals / (Australia) Wendy Turnbull 3–6, 6–4, 6–3

== Prize money ==
Event	W	F	3rd	4th	QF	Round of 16	Round of 32
Singles	$20,000	$10,000	$4,950	$4,650	$2,100	$1,100	$550
