= 1971 Virginia Slims of San Diego =

- Date: April 22–25
- Edition: 1st
- Category: WT Pro Tour
- Draw: 16S / 4D
- Prize money: $12,500
- Surface: Hard / outdoor
- Location: San Diego, California U.S.
- Venue: Morley Field Sports Complex

Champions

Singles
- (United States) Billie Jean King

Doubles
- (United States) Rosie Casals / (United States) Billie Jean King
- Southern California Open

The 1971 Virginia Slims of San Diego was a women's tennis tournament played on outdoor hard courts at Morley Field Sports Complex in San Diego, California, United States, that was part of the 1971 Women's Tennis Circuit. It was the inaugural edition of the tournament and was held from April 22 through April 25, 1971. First-seeded Billie Jean King won the singles title and earned $2,5000 first-prize money.

== Finals ==
=== Singles ===
(United States) Billie Jean King defeated (United States) Rosie Casals 4–6, 7–5, 6–1

=== Doubles ===
(United States) Rosie Casals / (United States) Billie Jean King defeated (France) Françoise Dürr / (Australia) Judy Tegart Dalton 6–7, 6–2, 6–3
