= 2010 Mercury Insurance Open – Singles =

Singles
- 2010 Mercury Insurance Open

Final
- Champion: (Russia) Svetlana Kuznetsova
- Runner-up: (Poland) Agnieszka Radwańska
- Score: 6–4, 6–7^{(7–9)}, 6–3

Details
- Draw: 30
- Seeds: 8

Events
Singles	Doubles
- San Diego Open

Svetlana Kuznetsova defeated Agnieszka Radwańska 6–4, 6–7^{(7–9)}, 6–3 in the final.

== Seeds ==
The top two seeds receive a bye into the second round.

1. (Serbia) Jelena Janković (second round)
2. (Australia) Samantha Stosur (quarterfinals)
3. (Russia) Vera Zvonareva (second round)
4. (Poland) Agnieszka Radwańska (final)
5. (Italy) Flavia Pennetta (semifinals)
6. (France) Marion Bartoli (first round)
7. (Israel) Shahar Pe'er (quarterfinals)
8. (Belgium) Yanina Wickmayer (first round)

== Main draw ==
Key

- Q = Qualifier
- WC = Wild card
- LL = Lucky loser
- Alt = Alternate
- ITF = ITF entry
- PR = Protected ranking
- SR = Special ranking
- SE = Special exempt
- JE = Junior exempt
- JR = Junior Accelerator Programme entrant
- CO = College Accelerator Programme entrant
- NG = Next Gen Accelerator Program entrant
- w/o = Walkover
- r = Retired
- d = Defaulted

=== Finals ===
Semifinals
(Slovakia) Daniela Hantuchová	4	2
4	(Poland) Agnieszka Radwańska	6	6
(Russia) Svetlana Kuznetsova	6	6
5	(Italy) Flavia Pennetta	4	0

Final
4	(Poland) Agnieszka Radwańska	4	7	3
(Russia) Svetlana Kuznetsova	6	6^{7}	6

=== Top half ===
First round
(Russia) A Kleybanova	6	5	6
(France) A Rezaï	2	7	3
Q	(United States) S Perry	3	2
(China) J Zheng	6	6
(Slovakia) D Hantuchová	3	7	6
6	(France) M Bartoli	6	6^{3}	4
4	(Poland) A Radwańska	7	6
Q	(South Africa) C Scheepers	5	3
(Ukraine) A Bondarenko	1	6^{2}
(Russia) D Safina	6	7
(Kazakhstan) Y Shvedova	5	6	6
(Russia) N Petrova	7	4	1
WC	(Serbia) A Ivanovic	6^{3}	3
7	(Israel) S Pe'er	7	6

Second round
1	(Serbia) J Janković	5	2
(Russia) A Kleybanova	7	6
(China) J Zheng	2	1
(Slovakia) D Hantuchová	6	6
4	(Poland) A Radwańska	6	6
(Russia) D Safina	1	3
(Kazakhstan) Y Shvedova	5	4
7	(Israel) S Pe'er	7	6

Quarterfinals
(Russia) A Kleybanova	6	4	3
(Slovakia) D Hantuchová	2	6	6
4	(Poland) A Radwańska	6	6
7	(Israel) S Pe'er	2	0

Semifinals
(Slovakia) D Hantuchová	4	2
4	(Poland) A Radwańska	6	6

=== Bottom half ===
First round
8	(Belgium) Y Wickmayer	3	6	1
(Russia) S Kuznetsova	6	2	6
(Belarus) O Govortsova	3	6	5
(Italy) S Errani	6	1	7
WC	(Argentina) G Dulko	0	0	r
Q	(United States) C Vandeweghe	6	3
WC	(Slovakia) D Cibulková	0	6	4
3	(Russia) V Zvonareva	6	3	6
5	(Italy) F Pennetta	6	7
(Ukraine) K Bondarenko	2	5
(Russia) M Kirilenko	6	6^{4}	6
Q	(Japan) K Nara	4	7	3
(United States) M Oudin	6	6
LL	(United States) J Hampton	3	4

Second round
(Russia) S Kuznetsova	6	6^{5}	7
(Italy) S Errani	1	7	5
Q	(United States) C Vandeweghe	2	7	6
3	(Russia) V Zvonareva	6	5	4
5	(Italy) F Pennetta	6	7
(Russia) M Kirilenko	4	6^{5}
(United States) M Oudin	4	4
2	(Australia) S Stosur	6	6

Quarterfinals
(Russia) S Kuznetsova	7	6
Q	(United States) C Vandeweghe	5	2
5	(Italy) F Pennetta	6	6
2	(Australia) S Stosur	4	3

Semifinals
(Russia) S Kuznetsova	6	6
5	(Italy) F Pennetta	4	0

== Qualifying ==
=== Seeds ===
1. (Canada) ~~Aleksandra Wozniak~~ (withdrew due to a wrist pain)
2. (Japan) Kimiko Date-Krumm (first round)
3. (Russia) Alla Kudryavtseva (second round)
4. (Japan) Ayumi Morita (first round)
5. (South Africa) Chanelle Scheepers (qualified)
6. (United States) Bethanie Mattek-Sands (second round)
7. (United States) Jill Craybas (second round)
8. (Japan) Kurumi Nara (qualified)
9. (Hungary) Gréta Arn (second round)

=== Qualifiers ===
1. (United States) CoCo Vandeweghe
2. (South Africa) Chanelle Scheepers
3. (United States) Shenay Perry
4. (Japan) Kurumi Nara

=== Lucky loser ===
1. (United States) Jamie Hampton

=== Qualifying draw ===
==== First qualifier ====
First round
9	(Hungary) Gréta Arn	6	6
WC	(United States) Stacey Tan	0	3
(United States) Sloane Stephens	6	6
WC	(United States) Amelia Herring	1	3
(United States) CoCo Vandeweghe	6	6
WC	(Mexico) Nazari Urbina	2	1
Alt	(United States) Julia Boserup	4	4
6	(United States) Bethanie Mattek-Sands	6	6

Second round
9	(Hungary) Gréta Arn	2	3
(United States) Sloane Stephens	6	6
(United States) CoCo Vandeweghe	6	4	6
6	(United States) Bethanie Mattek-Sands	1	6	3

Qualifying competition
(United States) Sloane Stephens	6	6^{10}	5
(United States) CoCo Vandeweghe	4	7^{12}	7

==== Second qualifier ====
First round
2	(Japan) Kimiko Date-Krumm	2	6^{6}
(United States) Jamie Hampton	6	7^{8}
(United States) Abigail Spears	6	6
(Croatia) Ivana Lisjak	4	3
(Japan) Yurika Sema	2	1
(Uzbekistan) Akgul Amanmuradova	6	6
(Ukraine) Tetiana Luzhanska	3	6	0
5	(South Africa) Chanelle Scheepers	6	4	6

Second round
(United States) Jamie Hampton	7^{8}	6
(United States) Abigail Spears	6^{6}	3
(Uzbekistan) Akgul Amanmuradova	7^{7}	6^{3}	4
5	(South Africa) Chanelle Scheepers	6^{4}	7^{7}	6

Qualifying competition
(United States) Jamie Hampton	6	0	5
5	(South Africa) Chanelle Scheepers	1	6	7

==== Third qualifier ====
First round
3	(Russia) Alla Kudryavtseva	6	6
(United States) Alison Riske	3	4
(Poland) Urszula Radwańska	2	1
(Croatia) Ajla Tomljanović	6	6
(Netherlands) Michaëlla Krajicek	3	1
(United States) Shenay Perry	6	6
WC	(United States) Tori Kinard	3	0
7	(United States) Jill Craybas	6	6

Second round
3	(Russia) Alla Kudryavtseva	6	0	3
(Croatia) Ajla Tomljanović	3	6	6
(United States) Shenay Perry	6	6
7	(United States) Jill Craybas	4	2

Qualifying competition
(Croatia) Ajla Tomljanović	2	3
(United States) Shenay Perry	6	6

==== Fourth qualifier ====
First round
4	(Japan) Ayumi Morita	6^{5}	2
(Ukraine) Olga Savchuk	7^{7}	6
(Portugal) Michelle Larcher de Brito	3	4
(United States) Madison Brengle	6	6
(United States) Alexandra Stevenson	6^{4}	6^{5}
(Croatia) Mirjana Lučić	7^{7}	7^{7}
(Colombia) Catalina Castaño	2	3
8	(Japan) Kurumi Nara	6	6

Second round
(Ukraine) Olga Savchuk	2	6	3
(United States) Madison Brengle	6	2	6
(Croatia) Mirjana Lučić	6^{11}	6	4
8	(Japan) Kurumi Nara	7^{13}	3	6

Qualifying competition
(United States) Madison Brengle	3	2
8	(Japan) Kurumi Nara	6	6
