= 1986 Virginia Slims of San Diego =

- Date: July 28 – August 3
- Edition: 3rd
- Draw: 32S / 16D
- Prize money: $75,000
- Surface: Hard / outdoor
- Location: San Diego, California, U.S.
- Venue: San Diego Hilton Beach & Tennis Resort

Champions

Singles
- (United States) Melissa Gurney

Doubles
- (United States) Beth Herr / (United States) Alycia Moulton
- Southern California Open

The 1986 Virginia Slims of San Diego was a women's tennis tournament played on outdoor hard courts at the San Diego Hilton Beach & Tennis Resort in San Diego, California in the United States and was part of the 1986 Virginia Slims World Championship Series. It was the third edition of the tournament and ran from July 28 through August 3, 1986. Unseeded Melissa Gurney won the singles title.

== Finals ==
=== Singles ===
(United States) Melissa Gurney defeated (United States) Stephanie Rehe 6–2, 6–4

- It was Gurney's 2nd singles title of the year and of her career.

=== Doubles ===
(United States) Beth Herr / (United States) Alycia Moulton defeated (United States) Elise Burgin / (South Africa) Rosalyn Fairbank 5–7, 6–2, 6–4
