= 1981 Wells Fargo Open =

- Date: July 27 – August 2
- Edition: 4th
- Category: Toyota Series (Category 4)
- Draw: 32S / 16D
- Prize money: $125,000
- Surface: Hard / outdoor
- Location: San Diego, California U.S.
- Venue: Rancho Bernardo Inn

Champions

Singles
- (United States) Tracy Austin

Doubles
- (United States) Kathy Jordan / (United States) Candy Reynolds
- Southern California Open

The 1981 Wells Fargo Open was a women's tennis tournament played on outdoor hard courts at the Rancho Bernardo Inn in San Diego, California in the United States that was part of the Toyota Series of the 1981 WTA Tour. It was the fourth edition of the tournament and was held from July 27 through August 2, 1981. First-seeded Tracy Austin won the singles title, her third consecutive at the event, and earned $22,000 first-prize money.

== Finals ==
=== Singles ===
(United States) Tracy Austin defeated (United States) Pam Shriver 6–2, 5–7, 6–2

- It was Austin's 3rd singles title of the year and the 24th of her career.

=== Doubles ===
(United States) Kathy Jordan / (United States) Candy Reynolds defeated (United States) Rosie Casals / (United States) Pam Shriver 6–1, 2–6, 6–4

== Prize money ==
Event	W	F	SF	QF	Round of 16	Round of 32
Singles	$22,000	$11,000	$5,875	$2,800	$1,500	$750
