= 2005 Acura Classic – Doubles =

Doubles
- 2005 Acura Classic

Final
- Champions: (Spain) Conchita Martínez (Spain) Virginia Ruano Pascual
- Runners-up: (Slovakia) Daniela Hantuchová (Japan) Ai Sugiyama
- Score: 6–7^{(7–9)}, 6–1, 7–5

Details
- Draw: 28
- Seeds: 8

Events
Singles	Doubles
- San Diego Open

Cara Black and Rennae Stubbs were the defending champions, but lost in the semifinals to Daniela Hantuchová and Ai Sugiyama.

Conchita Martínez and Virginia Ruano Pascual won in the final, defeating Daniela Hantuchová and Ai Sugiyama 6–7^{(7–9)}, 6–1, 7–5.

== Seeds ==
The top four seeds received a bye into the second round.

1. (Zimbabwe) Cara Black / (Australia) Rennae Stubbs (semifinals)
2. (Russia) Elena Likhovtseva / (Russia) Vera Zvonareva (semifinals, retired due to a left ankle sprain by Zvonareva)
3. (Spain) Conchita Martínez / (Spain) Virginia Ruano Pascual (champions)
4. (United States) Lisa Raymond / (Australia) Samantha Stosur (second round)
5. (Slovakia) Daniela Hantuchová / (Japan) Ai Sugiyama (final)
6. (United States) ~~Corina Morariu~~ / (Switzerland) ~~Patty Schnyder~~ (withdrew due to a left hip strain by Morariu)
7. (Germany) Anna-Lena Grönefeld / (United States) Martina Navratilova (first round)
8. (Czech Republic) Iveta Benešová / (Australia) Bryanne Stewart (first round)

== Draw ==
Key

- Q = Qualifier
- WC = Wild card
- LL = Lucky loser
- Alt = Alternate
- ITF = ITF entry
- PR = Protected ranking
- SR = Special ranking
- SE = Special exempt
- JE = Junior exempt
- JR = Junior Accelerator Programme entrant
- CO = College Accelerator Programme entrant
- NG = Next Gen Accelerator Program entrant
- w/o = Walkover
- r = Retired
- d = Defaulted

=== Finals ===
Semifinals
1	(Zimbabwe) Cara Black (Australia) Rennae Stubbs	7^{12}	4	3
5	(Slovakia) Daniela Hantuchová (Japan) Ai Sugiyama	6^{10}	6	6
3	(Spain) Conchita Martínez (Spain) Virginia Ruano Pascual	1
2	(Russia) Elena Likhovtseva (Russia) Vera Zvonareva	3^{r}

Final
5	(Slovakia) Daniela Hantuchová (Japan) Ai Sugiyama	7^{9}	1	5
3	(Spain) Conchita Martínez (Spain) Virginia Ruano Pascual	6^{7}	6	7

=== Top half ===
First round
(Italy) T Garbin (Italy) F Pennetta	6	4	3
(Russia) A Jidkova (Slovenia) M Matevžič	0	6	6
(Australia) L McShea (United States) A Spears	7	6
WC	(South Africa) K Grant (Serbia and Montenegro) J Janković	5	3
(Japan) N Miyagi (United States) L Osterloh	6	6
LL	(Canada) MÈ Pelletier (Czech Republic) H Šromová	3	4
(France) M Bartoli (France) M Pierce	6	6^{4}	6
(Argentina) ME Salerni (Venezuela) M Vento-Kabchi	0	7^{7}	2
(France) N Dechy (Italy) F Schiavone	7^{8}	7^{9}
(Ukraine) Y Fedak (Russia) G Voskoboeva	6^{6}	6^{7}
(Argentina) G Dulko (Russia) D Safina	6	1	5
5	(Slovakia) D Hantuchová (Japan) A Sugiyama	3	6	7

Second round
1	(Zimbabwe) C Black (Australia) R Stubbs	6	6
(Russia) A Jidkova (Slovenia) M Matevžič	2	1
(Australia) L McShea (United States) A Spears	6	7
(Japan) N Miyagi (United States) L Osterloh	0	5
4	(United States) L Raymond (Australia) S Stosur	6^{1}	4
(France) M Bartoli (France) M Pierce	7^{7}	6
(France) N Dechy (Italy) F Schiavone	3	3
5	(Slovakia) D Hantuchová (Japan) A Sugiyama	6	6

Quarterfinals
1	(Zimbabwe) C Black (Australia) R Stubbs	6	6
(Australia) L McShea (United States) A Spears	4	4
(France) M Bartoli (France) M Pierce	4	6	2
5	(Slovakia) D Hantuchová (Japan) A Sugiyama	6	4	6

Semifinals
1	(Zimbabwe) C Black (Australia) R Stubbs	7^{12}	4	3
5	(Slovakia) D Hantuchová (Japan) A Sugiyama	6^{10}	6	6

=== Bottom half ===
First round
7	(Germany) AL Grönefeld (United States) M Navratilova	4	4
Q	(Ukraine) K Bondarenko (Russia) A Rodionova	6	6
(Canada) M Drake (United States) L Granville	6	6
(United States) J Craybas (United States) M Tu	3	3
(Poland) M Domachowska (Russia) M Kirilenko	4	7^{20}	7^{7}
(Japan) S Asagoe (Israel) S Pe'er	6	6^{18}	6^{5}
8	(Czech Republic) I Benešová (Australia) B Stewart	2	3
(Chinese Taipei) J Lee (China) S Peng	6	6
(Croatia) S Talaja (United States) M Washington	4	6	2
(Greece) E Daniilidou (United States) J Russell	6	4	6
WC	(United States) Biffy Kaufman (United States) L Nelson	6	5	3
(Russia) E Dementieva (France) T Golovin	3	7	6

Second round
Q	(Ukraine) K Bondarenko (Russia) A Rodionova	6	6^{4}	6
(Canada) M Drake (United States) L Granville	4	7^{7}	2
(Poland) M Domachowska (Russia) M Kirilenko	2	2
3	(Spain) C Martínez (Spain) V Ruano Pascual	6	6
(Chinese Taipei) J Lee (China) S Peng	6	6
(Greece) E Daniilidou (United States) J Russell	2	3
(Russia) E Dementieva (France) T Golovin	0	6^{5}
2	(Russia) E Likhovtseva (Russia) V Zvonareva	6	7^{7}

Quarterfinals
Q	(Ukraine) K Bondarenko (Russia) A Rodionova	5	3
3	(Spain) C Martínez (Spain) V Ruano Pascual	7	6
(Chinese Taipei) J Lee (China) S Peng	3	6	0
2	(Russia) E Likhovtseva (Russia) V Zvonareva	6	4	6

Semifinals
3	(Spain) C Martínez (Spain) V Ruano Pascual	1
2	(Russia) E Likhovtseva (Russia) V Zvonareva	3^{r}
