= 1994 Toshiba Classic =

- Date: August 1–7
- Edition: 16th
- Category: Tier II
- Draw: 56S / 28D
- Prize money: $400,000
- Surface: Hard / outdoor
- Location: San Diego, California, U.S.
- Venue: La Costa Resort and Spa

Champions

Singles
- (Germany) Steffi Graf

Doubles
- (Czech Republic) Jana Novotná / (Spain) Arantxa Sánchez
- Southern California Open

The 1994 Toshiba Classic was a women's tennis tournament played on outdoor hard courts in San Diego, California, United States that was part of Tier II of the 1994 WTA Tour. It was the 16th edition of the tournament and was held from August 1 through August 7, 1994. First-seeded Steffi Graf won the singles title, her fourth at the event.

== Finals ==
=== Singles ===
(Germany) Steffi Graf defeated (Spain) Arantxa Sánchez Vicario, 6–2, 6–1

- It was Graf's 7th singles title of the year and the 86th of her career.

=== Doubles ===
(Czech Republic) Jana Novotná / (Spain) Arantxa Sánchez Vicario defeated (United States) Ginger Helgeson / (Australia) Rachel McQuillan, 6–3, 6–3
