= 1998 Toshiba Classic – Doubles =

Doubles
- 1998 Toshiba Classic

Final
- Champions: (United States) Lindsay Davenport (Belarus) Natasha Zvereva
- Runners-up: (France) Alexandra Fusai (France) Nathalie Tauziat
- Score: 6–2, 6–1

Details
- Draw: 16
- Seeds: 4

Events
| Singles | Doubles |
- Toshiba Classic

Martina Hingis and Arantxa Sánchez Vicario were the reigning champions but did not compete that year.

Lindsay Davenport and Natasha Zvereva won in the final 6–2, 6–1 against Alexandra Fusai and Nathalie Tauziat.

== Seeds ==
Champion seeds are indicated in bold text while text in italics indicates the round in which those seeds were eliminated.

1. (United States) **Lindsay Davenport** / (Belarus) **Natasha Zvereva (champions)**
2. (France) Alexandra Fusai / (France) Nathalie Tauziat (final)
3. (Indonesia) Yayuk Basuki / (Netherlands) Caroline Vis (quarterfinals)
4. (United States) Lisa Raymond / (Australia) Rennae Stubbs (first round)

== Draw ==
Key

- Q = Qualifier
- WC = Wild card
- LL = Lucky loser
- Alt = Alternate
- ITF = ITF entry
- PR = Protected ranking
- SR = Special ranking
- SE = Special exempt
- JE = Junior exempt
- JR = Junior Accelerator Programme entrant
- CO = College Accelerator Programme entrant
- NG = Next Gen Accelerator Program entrant
- w/o = Walkover
- r = Retired
- d = Defaulted

First round
1 | (United States) **L Davenport** (Belarus) **N Zvereva** | **6** | **6**
(Australia) C Barclay (United States) D Graham | 0 | 4
(United States) K Adams (Netherlands) M Bollegraf | 3 | **6** | 5
(Australia) **K Kunce** (Japan) **N Miyagi** | **6** | 2 | **7**
4 | (United States) L Raymond (Australia) R Stubbs | 4 | 3
(Spain) **C Martínez** (Argentina) **P Tarabini** | **6** | **6**
Q | (Italy) R Grande (France) S Testud | **6** | 5 | 4
(Russia) **E Likhovtseva** (Japan) **A Sugiyama** | 2 | **7** | **6**
(Japan) R Hiraki (Croatia) I Majoli | 3 | 0
(Argentina) **I Gorrochategui** (Ukraine) **E Tatarkova** | **6** | **6**
(France) J Halard-Decugis (Latvia) L Neiland | 3 | 1
3 | (Indonesia) **Y Basuki** (Netherlands) **C Vis** | **6** | **6**
(Croatia) M Lučić (United States) M Seles | 4 | **6** | 0
(United States) **C Rubin** (Romania) **I Spîrlea** | **6** | 3 | **6**
WC | (United States) J Capriati (Argentina) M Paz | 6 | 2
2 | (France) **A Fusai** (France) **N Tauziat** | **7** | **6**

Quarterfinals
1 | (United States) **L Davenport** (Belarus) **N Zvereva** | **6** | **6**
(Australia) K Kunce (Japan) N Miyagi | 4 | 4
(Spain) **C Martínez** (Argentina) **P Tarabini** | **7** | 3 | **7**
(Russia) E Likhovtseva (Japan) A Sugiyama | 5 | **6** | 5
(Argentina) **I Gorrochategui** (Ukraine) **E Tatarkova** | **7** | **6**
3 | (Indonesia) Y Basuki (Netherlands) C Vis | 6 | 3
(United States) C Rubin (Romania) I Spîrlea | **6** | 4 | 0
2 | (France) **A Fusai** (France) **N Tauziat** | 1 | **6** | **6**

Semifinals
1 | (United States) **L Davenport** (Belarus) **N Zvereva** | 4 | **6** | **6**
(Spain) C Martínez (Argentina) P Tarabini | **6** | 1 | 3
(Argentina) I Gorrochategui (Ukraine) E Tatarkova | 2 | 2
2 | (France) **A Fusai** (France) **N Tauziat** | **6** | **6**

Final
1 | (United States) **Lindsay Davenport** (Belarus) **Natasha Zvereva** | **6** | **6**
2 | (France) Alexandra Fusai (France) Nathalie Tauziat | 2 | 1

== Qualifying ==
=== Seeds ===
1. (Chinese Taipei) Janet Lee / (Chinese Taipei) Wang Shi-ting (second round)
2. **(Italy) Rita Grande / (France) Alexandra Fusai (qualified)**

=== Qualifiers ===
1. **(Italy) Rita Grande / (France) Alexandra Fusai**

=== Qualifying draw ===
First round
1 | **(Chinese Taipei) Janet Lee** **(Chinese Taipei) Wang Shi-ting** | **8**
(Canada) Sonya Jeyaseelan (Bulgaria) Pavlina Stoyanova | 4
**(Canada) Maureen Drake** **(Japan) Yuka Yoshida** | **8**
(Paraguay) Larissa Schaerer (Colombia) Fabiola Zuluaga | 0
**(United States) Sandra Cacic** **(United States) Laurie Fleming** | **8**
(Zimbabwe) Cara Black (United States) Ginger Helgeson-Nielsen | 3
(United States) Samantha Reeves (France) Anne-Gaëlle Sidot | 8
2 | **(Italy) Rita Grande** **(France) Sandrine Testud** | **9**

Second round
1 | (Chinese Taipei) Janet Lee (Chinese Taipei) Wang Shi-ting | 5
**(Canada) Maureen Drake** **(Japan) Yuka Yoshida** | **8**
(United States) Sandra Cacic (United States) Laurie Fleming | 0
2 | **(Italy) Rita Grande** **(France) Sandrine Testud** | **8**

Qualifying competition
(Canada) Maureen Drake (Japan) Yuka Yoshida | 1
2 | **(Italy) Rita Grande** **(France) Sandrine Testud** | **8**
