= 2005 Acura Classic – Singles =

Singles
- 2005 Acura Classic

Final
- Champion: (France) Mary Pierce
- Runner-up: (Japan) Ai Sugiyama
- Score: 6–0, 6–3

Details
- Draw: 56
- Seeds: 16

Events
Singles	Doubles
- San Diego Open

Mary Pierce defeated Ai Sugiyama in the final, 6–0, 6–3 to win the singles tennis title at the 2005 Southern California Open.

Lindsay Davenport was the reigning champion, but withdrew due to a lower-back strain.

== Seeds ==
The top eight seeds received a bye into the second round.

1. (United States) Lindsay Davenport (withdrew due to a lower-back strain)
2. (Russia) Svetlana Kuznetsova (third round)
3. (Russia) Elena Dementieva (second round)
4. (Russia) Nadia Petrova (second round)
5. (Switzerland) Patty Schnyder (quarterfinals)
6. (France) Mary Pierce (champion)
7. (Belgium) Kim Clijsters (quarterfinals)
8. (Russia) Vera Zvonareva (second round)
9. (Russia) Elena Likhovtseva (third round)
10. (France) Nathalie Dechy (third round)
11. (Serbia and Montenegro) Jelena Janković (third round)
12. (France) Tatiana Golovin (first round)
13. (Japan) Shinobu Asagoe (first round)
14. (Slovakia) Daniela Hantuchová (second round)
15. (Italy) Flavia Pennetta (second round)
16. (Russia) Dinara Safina (third round)
17. (Italy) Francesca Schiavone (third round)

== Draw ==
Key

- Q = Qualifier
- WC = Wild card
- LL = Lucky loser
- Alt = Alternate
- ITF = ITF entry
- PR = Protected ranking
- SR = Special ranking
- SE = Special exempt
- JE = Junior exempt
- JR = Junior Accelerator Programme entrant
- CO = College Accelerator Programme entrant
- NG = Next Gen Accelerator Program entrant
- w/o = Walkover
- r = Retired
- d = Defaulted

=== Finals ===
Quarterfinals
(China) Peng Shuai	6	6
7	(Belgium) Kim Clijsters	4	4
5	(Switzerland) Patty Schnyder	4	3
6	(France) Mary Pierce	6	6
(Russia) Anna Chakvetadze	3	4
(Japan) Akiko Morigami	6	6
(Bulgaria) Sesil Karatantcheva	1	2
(Japan) Ai Sugiyama	6	6

Semifinals
(China) Peng Shuai	2	2
6	(France) Mary Pierce	6	6
(Japan) Akiko Morigami	4	3^{r}
(Japan) Ai Sugiyama	6	4

Final
6	(France) Mary Pierce	6	6
(Japan) Ai Sugiyama	0	3

=== Top half ===
==== Section 1 ====
First round
(China) S Peng	7	6
Q	(Argentina) ME Salerni	5	1
Q	(Japan) A Nakamura	2	2
Q	(Russia) A Jidkova	6	6
(Spain) C Martínez	6^{11}	4
16	(Russia) D Safina	7^{13}	6
11	(Serbia and Montenegro) J Janković	7	6
(United States) A Frazier	5	0
(Venezuela) M Vento-Kabchi	4	5
Q	(Czech Republic) H Šromová	6	7
(United States) L Granville	6	0	6^{9}
(Poland) M Domachowska	3	6	7^{11}

Second round
3	(Russia) E Dementieva	5	4
(China) S Peng	7	6
Q	(Russia) A Jidkova	6	1	0
16	(Russia) D Safina	0	6	6
11	(Serbia and Montenegro) J Janković	6	6
Q	(Czech Republic) H Šromová	3	2
(Poland) M Domachowska	3	1
7	(Belgium) K Clijsters	6	6

Third round
(China) S Peng	7^{7}	6
16	(Russia) D Safina	6^{2}	0
11	(Serbia and Montenegro) J Janković	1	3
7	(Belgium) K Clijsters	6	6

Quarterfinals
(China) S Peng	6	6
7	(Belgium) K Clijsters	4	4

==== Section 2 ====
First round
(Czech Republic) K Peschke	0	6	7^{7}
WC	(United States) J Craybas	6	1	6^{2}
(Australia) S Stosur	3	2
Q	(Russia) A Rodionova	6	6
WC	(United States) A Spears	3	2
17	(Italy) F Schiavone	6	6
10	(France) N Dechy	6	6
(Puerto Rico) K Brandi	2	2
(Argentina) G Dulko	7^{7}	1	6
Q	(Japan) S Obata	6^{3}	6	3
(Germany) A-L Grönefeld	7^{7}	6
WC	(Greece) E Daniilidou	6^{5}	4

Second round
5	(Switzerland) P Schnyder	6	6^{2}	6
(Czech Republic) K Peschke	4	7^{7}	1
Q	(Russia) A Rodionova	2	2
17	(Italy) F Schiavone	6	6
10	(France) N Dechy	4	7	7^{7}
(Argentina) G Dulko	6	5	6^{3}
(Germany) A-L Grönefeld	1	1
6	(France) M Pierce	6	6

Third round
5	(Switzerland) P Schnyder	6^{1}	6	6
17	(Italy) F Schiavone	7^{7}	1	4
10	(France) N Dechy	5	3
6	(France) M Pierce	7	6

Quarterfinals
5	(Switzerland) P Schnyder	4	3
6	(France) M Pierce	6	6

=== Bottom half ===
==== Section 3 ====
First round
(Israel) S Pe'er	2	6	6
(Madagascar) D Randriantefy	6	3	4
(Colombia) F Zuluaga	2	6	5
(Czech Republic) I Benešová	6	3	7
(Russia) A Chakvetadze	6	6
12	(France) T Golovin	4	4
15	(Italy) F Pennetta	6	6
LL	(United States) M Irvin	2	2
(Japan) A Morigami	6	6
(Slovenia) M Matevžič	1	0
Q	(India) S Mirza	6	6
Q	(Italy) T Garbin	2	2

Second round
9	(Russia) E Likhovtseva	0	6	6
(Israel) S Pe'er	6	2	4
(Czech Republic) I Benešová	4	3
(Russia) A Chakvetadze	6	6
15	(Italy) F Pennetta	1	5
(Japan) A Morigami	6	7
Q	(India) S Mirza	6	6
4	(Russia) N Petrova	2	1

Third round
9	(Russia) E Likhovtseva	3	1
(Russia) A Chakvetadze	6	6
(Japan) A Morigami	6	4	6
Q	(India) S Mirza	2	6	4

Quarterfinals
(Russia) A Chakvetadze	3	4
(Japan) A Morigami	6	6

==== Section 4 ====
First round
(Croatia) K Šprem	6	6^{1}	1
(United States) M Washington	2	7^{7}	6
(France) M Bartoli	6	0	3
(United States) L Raymond	1	6	6
(Bulgaria) S Karatantcheva	6	0	7
13	(Japan) S Asagoe	1	6	5
14	(Slovakia) D Hantuchová	7^{7}	6
(Russia) M Kirilenko	6^{5}	1
(Japan) A Sugiyama	3
(United States) M Shaughnessy	0^{r}
(Russia) E Linetskaya	6^{5}	7	1
(Czech Republic) K Koukalová	7^{7}	5	6

Second round
8	(Russia) V Zvonareva	4	6	4
(United States) M Washington	6	4	6
(United States) L Raymond	6^{6}	4
(Bulgaria) S Karatantcheva	7^{8}	6
14	(Slovakia) D Hantuchová	5	6	2
(Japan) A Sugiyama	7	4	6
(Czech Republic) K Koukalová	5	3
2	(Russia) S Kuznetsova	7	6

Third round
(United States) M Washington	1	2
(Bulgaria) S Karatantcheva	6	6
(Japan) A Sugiyama	2	6	6
2	(Russia) S Kuznetsova	6	4	3

Quarterfinals
(Bulgaria) S Karatantcheva	1	2
(Japan) A Sugiyama	6	6
