= 1998 Toshiba Classic – Singles =

Singles
- 1998 Toshiba Classic
- 1997 Champion: (Switzerland) Martina Hingis

Final
- Champion: (United States) Lindsay Davenport
- Runner-up: (France) Mary Pierce
- Score: 6–3, 6–1

Details
- Draw: 28
- Seeds: 8

Events
Singles	Doubles
- Toshiba Classic

Martina Hingis was the defending champion but lost in the semifinals to Mary Pierce.

Lindsay Davenport won in the final 6–3, 6–1 against Pierce.

== Seeds ==
A champion seed is indicated in bold text while text in italics indicates the round in which that seed was eliminated. The top four seeds received a bye to the second round.

1. (Switzerland) Martina Hingis (semifinals)
2. (United States) **Lindsay Davenport (champion)**
3. (United States) Venus Williams (quarterfinals)
4. (United States) Monica Seles (semifinals)
5. (Spain) Conchita Martínez (second round)
6. (Germany) Steffi Graf (second round)
7. (Romania) Irina Spîrlea (first round)
8. (France) Nathalie Tauziat (quarterfinals)

== Draw ==
Key

- Q = Qualifier
- WC = Wild card
- LL = Lucky loser
- Alt = Alternate
- ITF = ITF entry
- PR = Protected ranking
- SR = Special ranking
- SE = Special exempt
- JE = Junior exempt
- JR = Junior Accelerator Programme entrant
- CO = College Accelerator Programme entrant
- NG = Next Gen Accelerator Program entrant
- w/o = Walkover
- r = Retired
- d = Defaulted

=== Final ===
Final
	(France) Mary Pierce	3	1
2	(United States) **Lindsay Davenport**	**6**	**6**

=== Top half ===
First round
WC	(Croatia) M Lučić	6^{3}	3
(Belarus) **N Zvereva**	**7^{7}**	**6**
(Croatia) **I Majoli**	**7^{7}**	**6**
(France) A Fusai	6^{1}	3
(South Africa) **J Kruger**	3	**6**	**6**
7	(Romania) I Spîrlea	**6**	2	4
(Indonesia) Y Basuki	0	1
(United States) **C Rubin**	**6**	**6**
(Austria) B Paulus	3	5
(France) **M Pierce**	**6**	**7**
(United States) K Po	4	2
5	(Spain) **C Martínez**	**6**	**6**

Second round
1	(Switzerland) **M Hingis**	**6**	**6**
(Belarus) N Zvereva	3	2
(Croatia) I Majoli	3	6^{1}
(South Africa) **J Kruger**	**6**	**7^{7}**
3	(United States) **V Williams**	**6**	**6**
(United States) C Rubin	3	2
(France) **M Pierce**	6^{1}	**6**	**6**
5	(Spain) C Martínez	**7^{7}**	2	3

Quarterfinals
1	(Switzerland) **M Hingis**	**6**	**6**
(South Africa) J Kruger	1	3
3	(United States) V Williams	**6**	6^{3}	0^{r}
(France) **M Pierce**	2	**7^{7}**	4

Semifinals
1	(Switzerland) M Hingis	**6**	6^{7}	2
(France) **M Pierce**	3	**7^{9}**	**6**

=== Bottom half ===
First round
6	(Germany) **S Graf**	**6**	**6**
(France) J Halard-Decugis	2	2
(Japan) **A Sugiyama**	5	**6**	**6**
Q	(United States) J Capriati	**7**	2	2
(France) **S Testud**	4	**6**	**6**
WC	(United States) A Stevenson	**6**	2	0
8	(France) **N Tauziat**	**7**	3	**6**
Q	(Chinese Taipei) S-T Wang	5	**6**	1
Q	(Chinese Taipei) J Lee	6^{4}	2
Q	(United States) **A Frazier**	**7^{7}**	**6**
(Russia) E Likhovtseva	2	1^{r}
(United States) **L Raymond**	**6**	5

Second round
6	(Germany) S Graf	4	**6**	5
(Japan) **A Sugiyama**	**6**	1	**7**
(France) S Testud	6^{5}	5
4	(United States) **M Seles**	**7^{7}**	**7**
8	(France) **N Tauziat**	**6**	3	**6**
Q	(United States) A Frazier	2	**6**	1
(United States) L Raymond	1	4
2	(United States) **L Davenport**	**6**	**6**

Quarterfinals
(Japan) A Sugiyama	4	3
4	(United States) **M Seles**	**6**	**6**
8	(France) N Tauziat	4	3
2	(United States) **L Davenport**	**6**	**6**

Semifinals
4	(United States) M Seles	4	**6**	5
2	(United States) **L Davenport**	**6**	2	**7**

== Qualifying ==
=== Qualifying seeds ===
1. (Italy) Rita Grande (first round)
2. (China) Li Fang (second round)
3. (Thailand) Tamarine Tanasugarn (qualifying competition)
4. (France) Anne-Gaëlle Sidot (second round)
5. (United States) **Amy Frazier (qualified)**
6. (Japan) Miho Saeki (first round)
7. (France) Nathalie Dechy (qualifying competition)
8. (United States) Sandra Cacic (second round)

=== Qualifiers ===
1. **(Chinese Taipei) Wang Shi-ting**
2. **(Chinese Taipei) Janet Lee**
3. **(United States) Amy Frazier**
4. **(United States) Jennifer Capriati**

=== Qualifying draw ===
==== First qualifier ====
First round
1	(Italy) Rita Grande	2	4
**(Canada) Jana Nejedly**	**6**	**6**
WC	(United States) Allison Bradshaw	3	1
**(Chinese Taipei) Wang Shi-ting**	**6**	**6**
**(Japan) Nana Miyagi**	**6**	**6**
(Canada) Maureen Drake	2	2
WC	(Russia) Lioudmila Skavronskaia	**6**	5	2
8	**(United States) Sandra Cacic**	3	**7**	**6**

Second round
(Canada) Jana Nejedly	3	3
**(Chinese Taipei) Wang Shi-ting**	**6**	**6**
**(Japan) Nana Miyagi**	**6**	**6**
8	(United States) Sandra Cacic	2	0

Qualifying competition
**(Chinese Taipei) Wang Shi-ting**	**6**	**7**
(Japan) Nana Miyagi	2	5

==== Second qualifier ====
First round
4	**(France) Anne-Gaëlle Sidot**	4	**6**	**6**
(United States) Jolene Watanabe	**6**	1	3
WC	(United States) Ania Bleszynski	3	6
**(Italy) Adriana Serra Zanetti**	**6**	**7**
**(Chinese Taipei) Janet Lee**	4	**6**	**6**
(Japan) Rika Hiraki	**6**	3	3
**(Canada) Sonya Jeyaseelan**	**7**	**6**
6	(Japan) Miho Saeki	5	1

Second round
4	(France) Anne-Gaëlle Sidot	5	6
**(Italy) Adriana Serra Zanetti**	**7**	**7**
**(Chinese Taipei) Janet Lee**	**7**	**6**
(Canada) Sonya Jeyaseelan	5	0

Qualifying competition
(Italy) Adriana Serra Zanetti	6	**6**	1
**(Chinese Taipei) Janet Lee**	**7**	4	**6**

==== Third qualifier ====
First round
5	**(United States) Amy Frazier**	**6**	**6**
(United States) Samantha Reeves	1	3
WC	(Argentina) Inés Gorrochategui	4	**7**	3
**(Japan) Yuka Yoshida**	**6**	6	**6**
**(United States) Ginger Helgeson-Nielsen**	**6**	**6**
(Zimbabwe) Cara Black	3	4
(Paraguay) Larissa Schaerer	1	1
3	**(Thailand) Tamarine Tanasugarn**	**6**	**6**

Second round
5	**(United States) Amy Frazier**	**6**	**6**
(Japan) Yuka Yoshida	3	4
(United States) Ginger Helgeson-Nielsen	2	**6**	3
3	**(Thailand) Tamarine Tanasugarn**	**6**	3	**6**

Qualifying competition
5	**(United States) Amy Frazier**	**6**	**6**
3	(Thailand) Tamarine Tanasugarn	2	3

==== Fourth qualifier ====
First round
7	**(France) Nathalie Dechy**	**6**	**6**
(Germany) Julia Abe	3	2
(United States) Lilia Osterloh	**6**	2	2
**(Bulgaria) Pavlina Stoyanova**	2	**6**	**6**
(Czech Republic) Sandra Kleinová	2	0
**(United States) Jennifer Capriati**	**6**	**6**
(Colombia) Fabiola Zuluaga	3	3
2	**(China) Li Fang**	**6**	**6**

Second round
7	**(France) Nathalie Dechy**	**6**	**6**
(Bulgaria) Pavlina Stoyanova	4	2
**(United States) Jennifer Capriati**	**6**	**6**
2	(China) Li Fang	1	3

Qualifying competition
7	(France) Nathalie Dechy	6	**6**	1
**(United States) Jennifer Capriati**	**7**	2	**6**
