= 2026 San Diego Open – Men's doubles =

Men's doubles
- 2026 San Diego Open

Final
- Champions: (United States) Trey Hilderbrand (United States) Mac Kiger
- Runners-up: (United States) Garrett Johns (United States) Karl Poling
- Score: 6–3, 6–4

Events
Singles	men	women
Doubles	men	women
- San Diego Open

Eliot Spizzirri and Tyler Zink were the defending champions but only Zink chose to defend his title, partnering Joshua Sheehy. He lost in the first round to Trey Hilderbrand and Mac Kiger.

Hilderbrand and Kiger won the title after defeating Garrett Johns and Karl Poling 6–3, 6–4 in the final.

== Seeds ==
1. (Ecuador) Diego Hidalgo / (United States) Patrik Trhac (semifinals)
2. (New Zealand) Finn Reynolds / (New Zealand) James Watt (semifinals)
3. (United States) Trey Hilderbrand / (United States) Mac Kiger (champions)
4. (United States) George Goldhoff / (United States) Reese Stalder (quarterfinals)

== Draw ==
Key

- Q = Qualifier
- WC = Wild card
- LL = Lucky loser
- Alt = Alternate
- ITF = ITF entry
- PR = Protected ranking
- SR = Special ranking
- SE = Special exempt
- JE = Junior exempt
- JR = Junior Accelerator Programme entrant
- CO = College Accelerator Programme entrant
- NG = Next Gen Accelerator Program entrant
- w/o = Walkover
- r = Retired
- d = Defaulted

First round
1	(Ecuador) D Hidalgo (United States) P Trhac	6	6
WC	(United States) William Kleege (United States) Noah Zamora	4	2
(United Kingdom) F Bass (United Kingdom) B Jones	3	6	[10]
(Venezuela) Juan José Bianchi (United States) D Milavsky	6	3	[5]
4	(United States) G Goldhoff (United States) R Stalder	3	6	[10]
(United States) S Kozlov (Australia) B Tomic	6	3	[5]
(United States) A Fenty (United States) K Smith	7	3	[8]
(United States) G Johns (United States) K Poling	5	6	[10]
(Australia) C Puttergill (United States) R Seggerman	6	6^{5}	[8]
(United Kingdom) S Duncan (United Kingdom) J MacKinlay	4	7^{7}	[10]
(United States) J Sheehy (United States) T Zink	4	4
3	(United States) T Hilderbrand (United States) M Kiger	6	6
WC	(United States) T Svajda (United States) Z Svajda	6	6
(Mexico) A Magadán (United States) N Schachter	4	1
(United States) P Kumar (Antigua and Barbuda) J Maginley	3	0
2	(New Zealand) F Reynolds (New Zealand) J Watt	6	6

Quarterfinals
1	(Ecuador) D Hidalgo (United States) P Trhac	6	6
(United Kingdom) F Bass (United Kingdom) B Jones	3	1
4	(United States) G Goldhoff (United States) R Stalder	5	4
(United States) G Johns (United States) K Poling	7	6
(United Kingdom) S Duncan (United Kingdom) J MacKinlay	0	3
3	(United States) T Hilderbrand (United States) M Kiger	6	6
WC	(United States) T Svajda (United States) Z Svajda	3	6^{3}
2	(New Zealand) F Reynolds (New Zealand) J Watt	6	7^{7}

Semifinals
1	(Ecuador) D Hidalgo (United States) P Trhac	6^{7}	1
(United States) G Johns (United States) K Poling	7^{9}	6
3	(United States) T Hilderbrand (United States) M Kiger	2	6	[12]
2	(New Zealand) F Reynolds (New Zealand) J Watt	6	2	[10]

Final
(United States) G Johns (United States) K Poling	3	4
3	(United States) T Hilderbrand (United States) M Kiger	6	6
