= 1982 Wells Fargo Open =

- Date: July 26 – August 1
- Edition: 5th
- Category: Toyota Series (Category 4)
- Draw: 56S / 32D
- Prize money: $125,000
- Surface: Hard / outdoor
- Location: San Diego, California U.S.
- Venue: Rancho Bernardo In

Champions

Singles
- (United States) Tracy Austin

Doubles
- (United States) Kathy Jordan / (United States) Paula Smith
- Southern California Open

The 1982 Wells Fargo Open was a women's tennis tournament played on outdoor hard courts at the Rancho Bernardo Inn in San Diego, California in the United States that was part of the Toyota Series of the 1982 WTA Tour. It was the fifth edition of the tournament and was held from July 26 through August 1, 1982. First-seeded Tracy Austin won the singles title, her fourth consecutive at the event, and earned $22,000 first-prize money.

== Finals ==
=== Singles ===
(United States) Tracy Austin defeated (United States) Kathy Rinaldi 7–6^{(7–5)}, 6–3

- It was Austin's 1st singles title of the year and the 30th and last of her career.

=== Doubles ===
(United States) Kathy Jordan / (United States) Paula Smith defeated (Brazil) Patricia Medrado / (Brazil) Cláudia Monteiro 6–3, 5–7, 7–6^{(7–3)}

== Prize money ==
Event	W	F	SF	QF	Round of 16	Round of 32	Round of 64
Singles	$22,000	$11,000	$5,575	$2,600	$1,300	$700	$350
