= 1988 Virginia Slims of San Diego – Doubles =

Doubles
- 1988 Virginia Slims of San Diego

Final
- Champions: (United States) Patty Fendick (Canada) Jill Hetherington
- Runners-up: (United States) Betsy Nagelsen (South Africa) Dianne van Rensburg
- Score: 7–6, 6–4

Details
- Draw: 16
- Seeds: 4

Events
Singles	Doubles
- Virginia Slims of San Diego

Jana Novotná and Catherine Suire were the defending champions but did not compete that year.

Patty Fendick and Jill Hetherington won in the final 7–6, 6–4 against Betsy Nagelsen and Dianne van Rensburg.

== Seeds ==
Champion seeds are indicated in bold text while text in italics indicates the round in which those seeds were eliminated.

1. (United States) Betsy Nagelsen / (South Africa) Dianne van Rensburg (final)
2. (South Africa) Rosalyn Fairbank / (United States) Gretchen Magers (semifinals)
3. (United Kingdom) Jo Durie / (United States) Sharon Walsh-Pete (semifinals)
4. (United States) **Patty Fendick** / (Canada) **Jill Hetherington (champions)**

== Draw ==
Key

- Q = Qualifier
- WC = Wild card
- LL = Lucky loser
- Alt = Alternate
- ITF = ITF entry
- PR = Protected ranking
- SR = Special ranking
- SE = Special exempt
- JE = Junior exempt
- JR = Junior Accelerator Programme entrant
- CO = College Accelerator Programme entrant
- NG = Next Gen Accelerator Program entrant
- w/o = Walkover
- r = Retired
- d = Defaulted

First round
1	(United States) **B Nagelsen** (South Africa) **D van Rensburg**	**7**	**6**
(United States) T Austin (United States) R White	6	1
(United States) **A Grossman** (Switzerland) **E Krapl**	**6**	**6**
(South Africa) R Gaddie (Japan) E Okagawa	2	4
3	(United Kingdom) **J Durie** (United States) **S Walsh-Pete**	**6**	**6**
(United States) J Thomas (Brazil) T Zambrzycki	2	3
(South Africa) L Gregory (United States) R Reis	1	4
(United States) **C MacGregor** (United States) **P Smith**	**6**	**6**
(United States) **A Ivan** (Japan) **A Nishiya**	5	**6**	**7**
(United States) L-A Eldredge (United States) M Werdel	**7**	3	5
(United States) S Savides (Japan) M Yanagi	5	3
4	(United States) **P Fendick** (Canada) **J Hetherington**	**7**	**6**
(United States) S Rehe (West Germany) C Singer	1	1
(United States) **E Hakami** (South Africa) **K Schimper**	**6**	**6**
(United States) C Benjamin (United States) H Na	6	1
2	(South Africa) **R Fairbank** (United States) **G Magers**	**7**	**6**

Quarterfinals
1	(United States) **B Nagelsen** (South Africa) **D van Rensburg**	**6**	**6**
(United States) A Grossman (Switzerland) E Krapl	1	2
3	(United Kingdom) **J Durie** (United States) **S Walsh-Pete**	**6**	**7**
(United States) C MacGregor (United States) P Smith	2	6
(United States) A Ivan (Japan) A Nishiya	6	5
4	(United States) **P Fendick** (Canada) **J Hetherington**	**7**	**7**
(United States) E Hakami (South Africa) K Schimper	2	6
2	(South Africa) **R Fairbank** (United States) **G Magers**	**6**	**7**

Semifinals
1	(United States) **B Nagelsen** (South Africa) **D van Rensburg**	5	**6**	**6**
3	(United Kingdom) J Durie (United States) S Walsh-Pete	**7**	4	1
4	(United States) **P Fendick** (Canada) **J Hetherington**	**7**	**7**
2	(South Africa) R Fairbank (United States) G Magers	5	5

Final
1	(United States) Betsy Nagelsen (South Africa) Dianne van Rensburg	6	4
4	(United States) **Patty Fendick** (Canada) **Jill Hetherington**	**7**	**6**
