= 2010 Mercury Insurance Open – Doubles =

Doubles
- 2010 Mercury Insurance Open

Final
- Champions: (Russia) Maria Kirilenko (China) Zheng Jie
- Runners-up: (United States) Lisa Raymond (Australia) Rennae Stubbs
- Score: 6–4, 6–4

Details
- Draw: 16
- Seeds: 4

Events
Singles	Doubles
- San Diego Open

Maria Kirilenko and Zheng Jie won in the final against Lisa Raymond and Rennae Stubbs, 6–4, 6–4.

== Seeds ==
1. (Argentina) Gisela Dulko / (Italy) Flavia Pennetta (first round)
2. (United States) Lisa Raymond / (Australia) Rennae Stubbs (final)
3. (Russia) Alisa Kleybanova / (Russia) Nadia Petrova (first round)
4. (Russia) Maria Kirilenko / (China) Zheng Jie (champions)

== Draw ==
Key

- Q = Qualifier
- WC = Wild card
- LL = Lucky loser
- Alt = Alternate
- ITF = ITF entry
- PR = Protected ranking
- SR = Special ranking
- SE = Special exempt
- JE = Junior exempt
- JR = Junior Accelerator Programme entrant
- CO = College Accelerator Programme entrant
- NG = Next Gen Accelerator Program entrant
- w/o = Walkover
- r = Retired
- d = Defaulted

=== Draw ===
First round
1	(Argentina) G Dulko (Italy) F Pennetta	2	4
(South Africa) N Grandin (United States) A Spears	6	6
(Chinese Taipei) S-w Hsieh (United States) M Shaughnessy	6^{5}	3
(Russia) S Kuznetsova (Russia) V Zvonareva	7	6
4	(Russia) M Kirilenko (China) J Zheng	7	4	[10]
(Uzbekistan) A Amanmuradova (Russia) A Kudryavtseva	6^{5}	6	[2]
(Poland) U Radwańska (South Africa) C Scheepers	6	6
(Ukraine) A Bondarenko (Ukraine) K Bondarenko	4	2
(United States) J Craybas (United States) S Perry	5	2
WC	(United States) L Davenport (United States) L Huber	7	6
(United States) B Mattek-Sands (China) Z Yan	6	6
3	(Russia) A Kleybanova (Russia) N Petrova	1	3
(Canada) M-È Pelletier (Ukraine) O Savchuk	1	4
(Chinese Taipei) C-j Chuang (Belarus) O Govortsova	6	6
(Italy) S Errani (United States) R Kops-Jones	1	4
2	(United States) L Raymond (Australia) R Stubbs	6	6

Quarterfinals
(South Africa) N Grandin (United States) A Spears	3	2
(Russia) S Kuznetsova (Russia) V Zvonareva	6	6
4	(Russia) M Kirilenko (China) J Zheng	6	6
(Poland) U Radwańska (South Africa) C Scheepers	3	0
WC	(United States) L Davenport (United States) L Huber	6^{5}	4
(United States) B Mattek-Sands (China) Z Yan	7	6
(Chinese Taipei) C-j Chuang (Belarus) O Govortsova	4	4
2	(United States) L Raymond (Australia) R Stubbs	6	6

Semifinals
(Russia) S Kuznetsova (Russia) V Zvonareva	0	r
4	(Russia) M Kirilenko (China) J Zheng	0
(United States) B Mattek-Sands (China) Z Yan	4	6^{4}
2	(United States) L Raymond (Australia) R Stubbs	6	7

Finals
4	(Russia) M Kirilenko (China) J Zheng	6	6
2	(United States) L Raymond (Australia) R Stubbs	4	4
