= 2026 San Diego Open – Men's singles =

Men's singles
- 2026 San Diego Open

Final
- Champion: (United States) Zachary Svajda
- Runner-up: (United States) Sebastian Korda
- Score: 6–4, 7–6^{(7–5)}

Events
| Singles | men | women |
| Doubles | men | women |
- San Diego Open

Eliot Spizzirri was the defending champion but chose not to defend his title.

Zachary Svajda won the title after defeating Sebastian Korda 6–4, 7–6^{(7–5)} in the final.

== Seeds ==
1. (United States) Sebastian Korda (final)
2. (Australia) Rinky Hijikata (quarterfinals)
3. (United States) Patrick Kypson (semifinals)
4. (United States) Zachary Svajda (champion)
5. (Japan) Sho Shimabukuro (semifinals)
6. (Canada) Liam Draxl (quarterfinals)
7. (United States) Colton Smith (quarterfinals)
8. (United States) Tristan Boyer (first round)

== Draw ==
Key

- Q = Qualifier
- WC = Wild card
- LL = Lucky loser
- Alt = Alternate
- ITF = ITF entry
- PR = Protected ranking
- SR = Special ranking
- SE = Special exempt
- JE = Junior exempt
- JR = Junior Accelerator Programme entrant
- CO = College Accelerator Programme entrant
- NG = Next Gen Accelerator Program entrant
- w/o = Walkover
- r = Retired
- d = Defaulted

=== Finals ===
Semifinals
1/WC | (United States) Sebastian Korda | 7^{7} | 6
3 | (United States) Patrick Kypson | 6^{4} | 2
4 | (United States) Zachary Svajda | 6 | 6
5 | (Japan) Sho Shimabukuro | 4 | 1

Final
1/WC | (United States) Sebastian Korda | 4 | 6^{5}
4 | (United States) Zachary Svajda | 6 | 7^{7}

=== Top half ===
First round
1/WC | (United States) S Korda | 6 | 7
(United States) D Milavsky | 4 | 5
Q | (Poland) Fryderyk Lechno-Wasiutyński | 1 | 5
(United States) Andre Ilagan | 6 | 7
Alt | (United States) Micah Braswell | 2 | 2
(United States) T Svajda | 6 | 6
(United States) M Cassone | 2 | 2
6 | (Canada) L Draxl | 6 | 6
3 | (United States) P Kypson | 7^{7} | 6
(United States) T Zink | 6^{5} | 1
Q | (United States) K Poling | 2 | 6^{5}
(United States) G Johns | 6 | 7^{7}
(United States) A Rybakov | 4 | 5
Alt | (Jamaica) B Bicknell | 6 | 7
(United States) Christian Langmo | 3 | 3
7/WC | (United States) C Smith | 6 | 6

Second round
1/WC | (United States) S Korda | 6 | 4 | 6
(United States) A Ilagan | 2 | 6 | 3
(United States) T Svajda | 3 | 4
6 | (Canada) L Draxl | 6 | 6
3 | (United States) P Kypson | 7^{7} | 6
(United States) G Johns | 6^{4} | 2
Alt | (Jamaica) B Bicknell | 7 | 6^{3} | 1
7/WC | (United States) C Smith | 5 | 7^{7} | 6

Quarterfinals
1/WC | (United States) S Korda | 7^{7} | 6
6 | (Canada) L Draxl | 6^{4} | 4
3 | (United States) P Kypson | 7^{7} | 6
7/WC | (United States) C Smith | 6^{5} | 0

Semifinals
1/WC | (United States) S Korda | 7^{7} | 6
3 | (United States) P Kypson | 6^{4} | 2

=== Bottom half ===
First round
8 | (United States) T Boyer | 3 | 7 | 4
(United Kingdom) T Samuel | 6 | 5 | 6
(United States) M Krueger | 6 | 6
(Germany) C-M Stebe | 1 | 1
Alt | (France) Raphael Perot | 3 | 6^{6}
Alt | (United States) K Smith | 6 | 7^{8}
Q | (United States) E Zhu | 2 | 4
4 | (United States) Z Svajda | 6 | 6
5 | (Japan) S Shimabukuro | 6 | 4 | 7^{7}
(United States) S Kozlov | 2 | 6 | 6^{5}
Alt | (United States) A Fenty | 6 | 7
Q | (Slovenia) B Artnak | 2 | 5
(Australia) B Tomic | 7^{8} | 6
Q | (United States) Felix Corwin | 6^{6} | 3
Q | (United States) S Dostanic | 6 | 3 | 2
2 | (Australia) R Hijikata | 2 | 6 | 6

Second round
(United Kingdom) T Samuel | 4 | 4
(United States) M Krueger | 6 | 6
Alt | (United States) K Smith | 6^{2} | 4
4 | (United States) Z Svajda | 7^{7} | 6
5 | (Japan) S Shimabukuro | 6 | 1 | 7^{7}
Alt | (United States) A Fenty | 4 | 6 | 6^{2}
(Australia) B Tomic | 6 | 4 | 3
2 | (Australia) R Hijikata | 3 | 6 | 6

Quarterfinals
(United States) M Krueger | 3 | 6 | 2
4 | (United States) Z Svajda | 6 | 2 | 6
5 | (Japan) S Shimabukuro | 6 | 6
2 | (Australia) R Hijikata | 4 | 4

Semifinals
4 | (United States) Z Svajda | 6 | 6
5 | (Japan) S Shimabukuro | 4 | 1
