= 1993 Mazda Classic =

- Date: August 2–8
- Edition: 15th
- Category: Tier II
- Draw: 56S / 28D
- Prize money: $375,000
- Surface: Hard / outdoor
- Location: San Diego, California, U.S.
- Venue: La Costa Resort and Spa

Champions

Singles
- (Germany) Steffi Graf

Doubles
- (United States) Gigi Fernández / (Czech Republic) Helena Suková
- Southern California Open

The 1993 Mazda Classic was a women's tennis tournament played on outdoor hard courts at the La Costa Resort and Spa in San Diego, California in the United States that was part of Tier II of the 1993 WTA Tour. It was the 15th edition of the tournament and was held from August 2 through August 8, 1993. First-seeded Steffi Graf won the singles title and earned $75,000 first-prize money as well as 300 ranking points

== Finals ==
=== Singles ===
(Germany) Steffi Graf defeated (Spain) Arantxa Sánchez Vicario, 6–4, 4–6, 6–1

- It was Graf's 6th singles title of the year and the 75th of her career.

=== Doubles ===
(United States) Gigi Fernández / (Czech Republic) Helena Suková defeated (United States) Pam Shriver / (Australia) Elizabeth Smylie, 6–4, 6–3
