= 1988 Virginia Slims of San Diego – Singles =

Singles
- 1988 Virginia Slims of San Diego

Final
- Champion: (United States) Stephanie Rehe
- Runner-up: (United States) Ann Grossman
- Score: 6–1, 6–1

Details
- Draw: 32
- Seeds: 8

Events
Singles	Doubles
- Virginia Slims of San Diego

Raffaella Reggi was the defending champion but did not compete that year.

Stephanie Rehe won in the final 6–1, 6–1 against Ann Grossman.

== Seeds ==
A champion seed is indicated in bold text while text in italics indicates the round in which that seed was eliminated.

1. (United States) Patty Fendick (first round)
2. (United States) **Stephanie Rehe (champion)**
3. (United States) Elly Hakami (second round)
4. (South Africa) Rosalyn Fairbank (semifinals)
5. (United States) Robin White (second round)
6. (United States) Gretchen Magers (quarterfinals)
7. (United Kingdom) Sara Gomer (first round)
8. (United Kingdom) Jo Durie (quarterfinals)

== Draw ==
Key

- Q = Qualifier
- WC = Wild card
- LL = Lucky loser
- Alt = Alternate
- ITF = ITF entry
- PR = Protected ranking
- SR = Special ranking
- SE = Special exempt
- JE = Junior exempt
- JR = Junior Accelerator Programme entrant
- CO = College Accelerator Programme entrant
- NG = Next Gen Accelerator Program entrant
- w/o = Walkover
- r = Retired
- d = Defaulted

First round
1	(United States) P Fendick	1	r
LL	(United States) **J Santrock**	**6**
(United States) H Na	1	0
(West Germany) **C Singer**	**6**	**6**
Q	(United States) **A Grossman**	**6**	**6**
(West Germany) E Pfaff	2	1
Q	(United States) L Green	2	4
5	(United States) **R White**	**6**	**6**
4	(South Africa) **R Fairbank**	**6**	4	**6**
(Canada) J Hetherington	1	**6**	3
(South Africa) **D van Rensburg**	**7**	**7**
(United States) B Nagelsen	5	6
(United States) **C MacGregor**	**6**	**6**
(Australia) M Jaggard	2	3
(United States) C Benjamin	**6**	4	2
8	(United Kingdom) **J Durie**	3	**6**	**6**
7	(United Kingdom) S Gomer	4	4
Q	(United States) **A Ivan**	**6**	**6**
Q	(Peru) P Vásquez	0	**6**	0
(United States) **L Bonder-Kreiss**	**6**	3	**6**
(Czechoslovakia) A Holíková	2	6
(United States) **D Graham**	**6**	**7**
(United Kingdom) M Javer	2	**6**	1
3	(United States) **E Hakami**	**6**	3	**6**
6	(United States) **G Magers**	**6**	**6**
(South Africa) K Schimper	0	2
(Switzerland) **E Krapl**	**6**	**7**
(United States) M Werdel	2	6
(Japan) M Yanagi	3	3
(Mexico) **A Gavaldón**	**6**	**6**
(United States) R Reis	2	5
2	(United States) **S Rehe**	**6**	**7**

Second round
LL	(United States) **J Santrock**	**6**	**6**
(West Germany) C Singer	1	2
Q	(United States) **A Grossman**	**6**	1	**7**
5	(United States) R White	3	**6**	5
4	(South Africa) **R Fairbank**	**7**	**6**
(South Africa) D van Rensburg	6	1
(United States) C MacGregor	3	**6**	1
8	(United Kingdom) **J Durie**	**6**	3	**6**
Q	(United States) A Ivan	4	2
(United States) **L Bonder-Kreiss**	**6**	**6**
(United States) **D Graham**	**6**	**6**
3	(United States) E Hakami	0	0
6	(United States) **G Magers**	**6**	6	**6**
(Switzerland) E Krapl	1	**7**	3
(Mexico) A Gavaldón	0	6
2	(United States) **S Rehe**	**6**	**7**

Quarterfinals
LL	(United States) J Santrock	**6**	3	3
Q	(United States) **A Grossman**	1	**6**	**6**
4	(South Africa) **R Fairbank**	**6**	**6**
8	(United Kingdom) J Durie	2	4
(United States) L Bonder-Kreiss	**6**	2	3
(United States) **D Graham**	1	**6**	**6**
6	(United States) G Magers	6	**6**	2
2	(United States) **S Rehe**	**7**	3	**6**

Semifinals
Q	(United States) **A Grossman**	**6**	2	**6**
4	(South Africa) R Fairbank	4	**6**	2
(United States) D Graham	2	2
2	(United States) **S Rehe**	**6**	**6**

Final
Q	(United States) Ann Grossman	1	1
2	(United States) **Stephanie Rehe**	**6**	**6**
