= Kelly Henry =

American tennis player

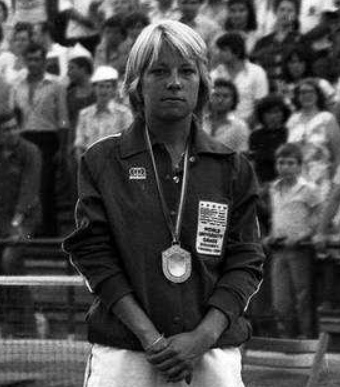
- Country (sports): United States
- Born: April 18, 1962 (age 64) Glendale, California, U.S.

Grand Slam singles results
- US Open: 3R (1979)
Medal record
Representing United States
Summer Universiade
Bronze medal – third place	1981 Bucharest	Women's singles

Kelly Henry (born April 18, 1962) is an American former professional tennis player.

== Biography ==
Henry had a noted school career, winning three consecutive CIF Southern Section singles titles from 1977 to 1979, while attending Glendale High School in California.

As a 17-year old she made the third round of the 1979 US Open, getting past Emilse Longo and 16th seed Betty Stöve.

Henry was runner-up to Kathy Horvath in the girls' singles at the 1980 French Open.

From 1981 to 1984, Henry played college tennis for the USC Trojans. At the 1981 Summer Universiade in Bucharest, Henry won a bronze medal in the women's singles competition. She made a return to the US Open main draw in 1982 and had a first round win over former champion Virginia Wade, then lost in the second round to Chris Evert, who went on to win the title. In 1983 she was a member of USC's NCAA Division I Championship winning team.
