= San Diego Open (tennis) =

Tennis tournament in San Diego

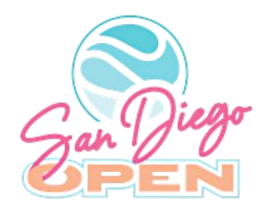

Tournament information
- Founded: 1971
- Location: San Diego, California, United States
- Venue: Omni La Costa Resort & Spa (2004–2015); Barnes Tennis Center (2021–present)
- Surface: Hardcourt / Outdoor
- Draw: 28S / 24SQ / 16D
- Website: Website

Current champions (2026)
- Men's singles: (United States) Zachary Svajda
- Women's singles: (United States) Elvina Kalieva
- Men's doubles: (United States) Trey Hilderbrand (United States) Mac Kiger
- Women's doubles: (Canada) Kayla Cross (United States) Alana Smith
ATP Tour
- Category: ATP 250 (2021–2022); Challenger 100 (2025–)
- Prize money: $160,000 (2025)
WTA Tour
- Category: WTA Tier I (2004–2007); WTA Premier (2010–2013); WTA 125K series (2015); WTA 500 (2022–2024); ITF W100 (2026-)
- Prize money: $922,573 (2024)

The Better Buzz Coffee San Diego Open is an annual professional tennis tournament on the ATP Challenger Tour and ITF Womens Circuit, held in San Diego, California, at the Barnes Tennis Center. Since 2025, it became an ATP Challenger 100 event when the WTA 500 event was cancelled. Since 2026 it is also an ITF W100 tournament.

== ATP tournament history ==
The San Diego Open was an ATP 250 tournament from 2021 until 2022. In August 2021, after the cancellation of the Asia Swing due to the COVID-19 pandemic, the Barnes Tennis Center was allocated a two-year 250 tournament license. Prior to that, it was exclusively a WTA event which was last held as a WTA Challenger in 2015 in Carlsbad, California. Billie Jean King accepted the role of honorary tournament chairperson. Daniel Vallverdú took on the position of managing director. Ryan Redondo was named the tournament director.

In 2022, with the Asia swing still cancelled due to COVID, Vallverdú again instigated the collaboration between the ATP and the San Diego Barnes Tennis Centre which was then allocated a second one year 250 tournament license to be held post US Open 17–25 September. Vallverdú again took on the position of Managing Director.

With the ATP Tour returning to China in 2023, the tournament's men's event ceased. In its place an ATP Challenger Tour 100 event was introduced in 2025 as the Better Buzz Coffee Roasters San Diego Open,at the same location in San Diego.

== WTA tournament history ==
This event was founded in 1971 as the Southern California Open, its official name. That year there had been two previous women's tennis tournaments in San Diego: a Virginia Slims of San Diego (sponsored name) aka the Southern California Open event, and the Wells Fargo Open, which ran from 1979 to 1982. Giscafre's former doubles partner, Jane Stratton, attained co-ownership of the tournament from 1986 until the event's cessation. The tournament has had various principal sponsors throughout its history, and has been played under the headings of the Great American Bank Classic, the Mazda Classic and the Toshiba Classic. The tournament was known for its strong player fields, location in the hills and atmosphere.

Although the tournament achieved Tier-I status only in 2004, it became a draw to the heavyweights in women's tennis since its inception in the 1980s, being a crucial warm-up tournament leading to the US Open. Past champions of the tournament include former world No.-1s Steffi Graf, Jennifer Capriati, Lindsay Davenport, Venus Williams, Martina Hingis, Justine Henin, and Maria Sharapova. Six players won the tournament more than once, four of them consecutively. Graf holds the record for most wins (4); Venus Williams holds the record for most consecutive titles (3).

The tournament's purse doubled to $200,000 in 1989, when the sponsor changed to San Diego–based Great American Bank from Virginia Slims, a cigarette brand owned by Philip Morris. The tournament moved from the San Diego Tennis & Racquet Club to the La Costa Resort and Spa in 1991, when the sponsor was changed to Mazda from Great American, which was in financial decline. On September 7, 2009, the Sony Ericsson WTA Tour announced the return of professional women's tennis to San Diego in 2010, under the sponsorship of Mercury Insurance. The Mercury Insurance Open was renamed the Southern California Open starting in 2013.

In 2014, the event was relocated to Tokyo, Japan.

In 2015, the tournament became the Carlsbad Classic, hosted by the Park Hyatt Aviara Resort in Carlsbad, California, from November 23–29. As a WTA Challenger event, the Carlsbad Classic featured a 32-player singles main draw, an 8-player qualifying draw, and an 8-team doubles draw with $125,000 in prize money. It was the first WTA tournament held during Thanksgiving week.

The tournament returned to the WTA Tour as a WTA 500 event in 2022 for three editions at the Barnes Tennis Center. It was cancelled in 2025 and replaced by the Mérida Open on the WTA Tour. Starting in 2026, the tournament returned to the professional women's tennis tour, now as an ITF W100 event.

Official name

- Southern California Open (San Diego) (1971–2013).

Sponsored names

- Virginia Slims of San Diego: 1971, 1985–1988
- Wells Fargo Open: 1979–1982
- Ginny of San Diego: 1984
- Great American Bank Classic: 1989–1990
- Mazda Classic: 1991–1993
- Toshiba Classic; 1994–1998
- TIG Classic: 1999
- Acura Classic: 2000–2007
- Mercury Insurance Open: 2010–2012
- Southern California Open: 2013
- Carlsbad Classic: 2015
- Cymbiotika: 2023–2024
- Better Buzz coffee roasters: 2026

== Past finals ==
=== Men's singles ===
Year	Champion	Runner-up	Score
2021	(Norway) Casper Ruud	(United Kingdom) Cameron Norrie	6–0, 6–2
2022	(United States) Brandon Nakashima	(United States) Marcos Giron	6–4, 6–4
2023–24	not held		
↓ ATP Challenger Tour ↓
2025	(United States) Eliot Spizzirri	(United States) Mackenzie McDonald	6–4, 2–6, 6–4
2026	(United States) Zachary Svajda	(United States) Sebastian Korda	6–4, 7–6^{(7–5)}

=== Women's singles ===
==== Prior tournaments in San Diego area ====
Year	Champion	Runner-up	Score
1971	(United States) Billie Jean King	(United States) Rosemary Casals	3–6, 7–5, 6–1

Year	Champion	Runner-up	Score
1979	(United States) Tracy Austin	(United States) Martina Navratilova	6–4, 6–2
1980	(United States) Tracy Austin (2)	(Australia) Wendy Turnbull	6–1, 6–3
1981	(United States) Tracy Austin (3)	(United States) Pam Shriver	6–2, 5–7, 6–2
1982	(United States) Tracy Austin (4)	(United States) Kathy Rinaldi	7–6, 6–3

==== Subsequent and current organized event ====
Year	Champion	Runner-up	Score
1984	(United States) Debbie Spence	(United States) Betsy Nagelsen	6–3, 6–7^{(3–7)}, 6–4
1985	(United Kingdom) Annabel Croft	(Australia) Wendy Turnbull	6–0, 7–6^{(7–5)}
1986	(United States) Melissa Gurney	(United States) Stephanie Rehe	6–2, 6–4
1987	(Italy) Raffaella Reggi	(Australia) Anne Minter	6–0, 6–4
1988	(United States) Stephanie Rehe	(United States) Ann Grossman	6–1, 6–1
1989	(West Germany) Steffi Graf	(United States) Zina Garrison	6–4, 7–5
↓ Tier III tournament ↓
1990	(West Germany) Steffi Graf (2)	(Switzerland) Manuela Maleeva-Fragnière	6–3, 6–2
1991	(United States) Jennifer Capriati	(Socialist Federal Republic of Yugoslavia) Monica Seles	4–6, 6–1, 7–6^{(7–2)}
1992	(United States) Jennifer Capriati (2)	(Spain) Conchita Martínez	6–3, 6–2
↓ Tier II tournament ↓
1993	(Germany) Steffi Graf (3)	(Spain) Arantxa Sánchez Vicario	6–4, 4–6, 6–1
1994	(Germany) Steffi Graf (4)	(Spain) Arantxa Sánchez Vicario	6–2, 6–1
1995	(Spain) Conchita Martínez	(United States) Lisa Raymond	6–2, 6–0
1996	(Japan) Kimiko Date	(Spain) Arantxa Sánchez Vicario	3–6, 6–3, 6–0
1997	(Switzerland) Martina Hingis	(United States) Monica Seles	7–6^{(7–4)}, 6–4
1998	(United States) Lindsay Davenport	(France) Mary Pierce	6–3, 6–1
1999	(Switzerland) Martina Hingis (2)	(United States) Venus Williams	6–4, 6–0
2000	(United States) Venus Williams	(United States) Monica Seles	6–0, 6–7^{(3–7)}, 6–2
2001	(United States) Venus Williams (2)	(United States) Monica Seles	6–2, 6–3
2002	(United States) Venus Williams (3)	(Federal Republic of Yugoslavia) Jelena Dokić	6–2, 6–2
2003	(Belgium) Justine Henin	(Belgium) Kim Clijsters	3–6, 6–2, 6–3
↓ Tier I tournament ↓
2004	(United States) Lindsay Davenport (2)	(Russia) Anastasia Myskina	6–1, 6–1
2005	(France) Mary Pierce	(Japan) Ai Sugiyama	6–0, 6–3
2006	(Russia) Maria Sharapova	(Belgium) Kim Clijsters	7–5, 7–5
2007	(Russia) Maria Sharapova (2)	(Switzerland) Patty Schnyder	6–2, 3–6, 6–0
2008–2009	not held		
↓ Premier tournament ↓
2010	(Russia) Svetlana Kuznetsova	(Poland) Agnieszka Radwańska	6–4, 6–7^{(7–9)}, 6–3
2011	(Poland) Agnieszka Radwańska	(Russia) Vera Zvonareva	6–3, 6–4
2012	(Slovakia) Dominika Cibulková	(France) Marion Bartoli	6–1, 7–5
2013	(Australia) Samantha Stosur	(Belarus) Victoria Azarenka	6–2, 6–3
2014	not held		
↓ WTA 125 tournament ↓
2015	(Belgium) Yanina Wickmayer	(United States) Nicole Gibbs	6–3, 7–6^{(7–4)}
2016–21	not held		
↓ WTA 500 tournament ↓
2022	(Poland) Iga Świątek	(Croatia) Donna Vekić	6–3, 3–6, 6–0
2023	(Czech Republic) Barbora Krejčíková	(United States) Sofia Kenin	6–4, 2–6, 6–4
2024	(United Kingdom) Katie Boulter	(Ukraine) Marta Kostyuk	5–7, 6–2, 6–2
2025	not held		
↓ ITF W100 tournament ↓
2026	(United States) Elvina Kalieva	(United States) Elizabeth Mandlik	3–6, 6–3, 6–1

=== Men's doubles ===
Year	Champions	Runners-up	Score
2021	(United Kingdom) Joe Salisbury (United Kingdom) Neal Skupski	(Australia) John Peers (Slovakia) Filip Polášek	7–6^{(7–2)}, 3–6, [10–5]
2022	(United States) Nathaniel Lammons (United States) Jackson Withrow	(Australia) Jason Kubler (Australia) Luke Saville	7–6^{(7–5)}, 6–2
2023–24	not held		
↓ ATP Challenger Tour ↓
2025	(United States) Eliot Spizzirri (United States) Tyler Zink	(Venezuela) Juan José Bianchi (United States) Noah Zamora	6–7^{(3–7)}, 7–6^{(7–4)}, [10–8]
2026	(United States) Trey Hilderbrand (United States) Mac Kiger	(United States) Garrett Johns (United States) Karl Poling	6–3, 6–4

=== Women's doubles ===
==== Prior ====
Year	Champions	Runners-up	Score
1971	(United States) Rosemary Casals (United States) Billie Jean King	(France) Françoise Dürr (Australia) Judy Tegart Dalton	6–7, 6–2, 6–3

Year	Champions	Runners-up	Score
1979	(United States) Rosemary Casals (2) (United States) Martina Navratilova	(United States) Betty Ann Grubb Stuart (United States) Ann Kiyomura	3–6, 6–4, 6–2
1980	(United States) Tracy Austin (United States) Ann Kiyomura	(United States) Rosemary Casals (Australia) Wendy Turnbull	3–6, 6–4, 6–3
1981	(United States) Kathy Jordan (United States) Candy Reynolds	(United States) Rosemary Casals (United States) Pam Shriver	6–1, 2–6, 6–4
1982	(United States) Kathy Jordan (2) (United States) Paula Smith	(Brazil) Patricia Medrado (Brazil) Cláudia Monteiro	6–3, 5–7, 7–6

==== Subsequent & current ====
Year	Champions	Runners-up	Score
1984	(United States) Betsy Nagelsen (United States) Paula Smith (2)	(United States) Terry Holladay (Poland) Iwona Kuczyńska	6–2, 6–4
1985	(United States) Candy Reynolds (2) (Australia) Wendy Turnbull	(South Africa) Rosalyn Fairbank (Australia) Susan Leo	6–4, 6–0
1986	(United States) Beth Herr (United States) Alycia Moulton	(United States) Elise Burgin (South Africa) Rosalyn Fairbank	5–7, 6–2, 6–4
1987	(Czechoslovakia) Jana Novotná (France) Catherine Suire	(United States) Elise Burgin (United States) Sharon Walsh	6–3, 6–4
1988	(United States) Patty Fendick (Canada) Jill Hetherington	(United States) Betsy Nagelsen (South Africa) Dinky Van Rensburg	7–6^{(12–10)}, 6–4
1989	(United States) Elise Burgin (South Africa) Rosalyn Fairbank	(United States) Gretchen Magers (United States) Robin White	4–6, 6–3, 6–3
↓ Tier III tournament ↓
1990	(United States) Patty Fendick (2) (United States) Zina Garrison	(United States) Elise Burgin (South Africa) Rosalyn Fairbank-Nideffer	6–4, 7–6^{(7–5)}
1991	(Canada) Jill Hetherington (2) (United States) Kathy Rinaldi	(United States) Gigi Fernández (France) Nathalie Tauziat	6–4, 3–6, 6–2
1992	(Czechoslovakia) Jana Novotná (2) (Commonwealth of Independent States) Larisa Neiland	(Spain) Conchita Martínez (Argentina) Mercedes Paz	6–1, 6–4
↓ Tier II tournament ↓
1993	(United States) Gigi Fernández (Czech Republic) Helena Suková	(United States) Pam Shriver (Australia) Elizabeth Smylie	6–4, 6–3
1994	(Czech Republic) Jana Novotná (2) (Spain) Arantxa Sánchez Vicario	(United States) Ginger Helgeson (Australia) Rachel McQuillan	6–3, 6–3
1995	(United States) Gigi Fernández (2) (Belarus) Natasha Zvereva	(France) Alexia Dechaume-Balleret (France) Sandrine Testud	6–2, 6–1
1996	(United States) Gigi Fernández (3) (Spain) Conchita Martínez	(Spain) Arantxa Sánchez Vicario (Latvia) Larisa Neiland	4–6, 6–3, 6–4
1997	(Switzerland) Martina Hingis (Spain) Arantxa Sánchez Vicario (2)	(United States) Amy Frazier (United States) Kimberly Po	6–3, 7–5
1998	(United States) Lindsay Davenport (Belarus) Natasha Zvereva (2)	(France) Alexandra Fusai (France) Nathalie Tauziat	6–2, 6–1
1999	(United States) Lindsay Davenport (2) (United States) Corina Morariu	(United States) Serena Williams (United States) Venus Williams	6–4, 6–1
2000	(United States) Lisa Raymond (Australia) Rennae Stubbs	(United States) Lindsay Davenport (Russia) Anna Kournikova	4–6, 6–3, 7–6^{(8–6)}
2001	(Zimbabwe) Cara Black (Russia) Elena Likhovtseva	(Switzerland) Martina Hingis (Russia) Anna Kournikova	6–4, 1–6, 6–4
2002	(Russia) Elena Dementieva (Slovakia) Janette Husárová	(Slovakia) Daniela Hantuchová (Japan) Ai Sugiyama	6–2, 6–4
2003	(Belgium) Kim Clijsters (Japan) Ai Sugiyama	(United States) Lindsay Davenport (United States) Lisa Raymond	6–4, 7–5
↓ Tier I tournament ↓
2004	(Zimbabwe) Cara Black (2) (Australia) Rennae Stubbs (2)	(Spain) Virginia Ruano Pascual (Argentina) Paola Suárez	4–6, 6–1, 6–4
2005	(Spain) Conchita Martínez (2) (Spain) Virginia Ruano Pascual	(Slovakia) Daniela Hantuchová (Japan) Ai Sugiyama	6–7^{(7–9)}, 6–1, 7–5
2006	(Zimbabwe) Cara Black (3) (Australia) Rennae Stubbs (3)	(Germany) Anna-Lena Grönefeld (United States) Meghann Shaughnessy	6–2, 6–2
2007	(Zimbabwe) Cara Black (4) (United States) Liezel Huber	(Russia) Anna Chakvetadze (Belarus) Victoria Azarenka	7–5, 6–3
2008–2009	not held		
↓ Premier tournament ↓
2010	(Russia) Maria Kirilenko (China) Zheng Jie	(United States) Lisa Raymond (Australia) Rennae Stubbs	6–4, 6–4
2011	(Czech Republic) Kvĕta Peschke (Slovenia) Katarina Srebotnik	(United States) Raquel Kops-Jones (United States) Abigail Spears	6–0, 6–2
2012	(United States) Raquel Kops-Jones (United States) Abigail Spears	(United States) Vania King (Russia) Nadia Petrova	6–2, 6–4
2013	(United States) Raquel Kops-Jones (2) (United States) Abigail Spears (2)	(Chinese Taipei) Chan Hao-ching (Slovakia) Janette Husárová	6–4, 6–1
2025	not held		
↓ WTA 125 tournament ↓
2015	(Brazil) Gabriela Cé (Paraguay) Verónica Cepede Royg	(Georgia (country)) Oksana Kalashnikova (Germany) Tatjana Maria	1–6, 6–4, [10–8]
2016–2021	not held		
↓ WTA 500 tournament ↓
2022	(United States) Coco Gauff (United States) Jessica Pegula	(Canada) Gabriela Dabrowski (Mexico) Giuliana Olmos	1–6, 7–5, [10–4]
2023	(Czech Republic) Barbora Krejčíková (Czech Republic) Kateřina Siniaková	(United States) Danielle Collins (United States) CoCo Vandeweghe	6–1, 6–4
2024	(United States) Nicole Melichar-Martinez (Australia) Ellen Perez	(United States) Desirae Krawczyk (United States) Jessica Pegula	6–1, 6–2
2025	not held		
↓ ITF W100 tournament ↓
2026	(Canada) Kayla Cross (United States) Alana Smith	(United States) Catherine Harrison (United States) Dalayna Hewitt	6–2, 6–3

Awards and achievements
Preceded by Miami	Favorite WTA Tier I – II Tournament; 1996	Succeeded by Indian Wells
