= 1994 Challenge Bell – Doubles =

Doubles
- 1994 Challenge Bell

Final
- Champions: (South Africa) Elna Reinach (France) Nathalie Tauziat
- Runners-up: (United States) Linda Harvey-Wild (United States) Chanda Rubin
- Score: 6–4, 6–3

Details
- Draw: 16
- Seeds: 4

Events
Singles	Doubles
← 1993 ·	Tournoi de Québec	· 1995 →

Katrina Adams and Manon Bollegraf were the defending champions, but they retired in the quarterfinals against Mélanie Bernard and Caroline Delisle.

Elna Reinach and Nathalie Tauziat won the title, defeating Linda Harvey-Wild and Chanda Rubin 6–4, 6–3 in the final.

== Seeds ==
1. (United States) Katrina Adams / (Netherlands) Manon Bollegraf (quarterfinals, retired)
2. (South Africa) Amanda Coetzer / (Argentina) Mercedes Paz (first round)
3. (South Africa) Elna Reinach / (France) Nathalie Tauziat (champions)
4. (United States) Linda Harvey-Wild / (United States) Chanda Rubin (final)

== Draw ==
=== Key ===
- Q = Qualifier
- WC = Wild card
- LL = Lucky loser
- Alt = Alternate
- SE = Special exempt
- PR = Protected ranking
- ITF = ITF entry
- JE = Junior exempt
- w/o = Walkover
- r = Retired
- d = Defaulted
- SR = Special ranking

First round
1	(United States) K Adams (Netherlands) M Bollegraf	7	6
(South Africa) L Horn (Canada) V Webb	5	0
(United States) E Adams (United States) R Baranski	4	6	4
(Canada) M Bernard (Canada) C Delisle	6	4	6
4	(United States) L Harvey-Wild (United States) C Rubin	6	6
(United States) M Jackson-Nobrega (United States) A Keller	3	0
(Belgium) L Courtois (France) K Quentrec	4	1
(Georgia (country)) N Louarsabishvili (United States) L Poruri	6	6
(United States) Ra Jensen (United States) Re Jensen	6	6^{2}	6
(United States) V Paynter (United States) D Scott	1	7^{7}	4
WC	(Canada) S Jeyaseelan (Canada) J Nejedly	3	0
3	(South Africa) E Reinach (France) N Tauziat	6	6
(France) S Amiach (France) I Demongeot	6	6
(Canada) M Drake (Australia) T Morton-Rodgers	2	0
Q	(France) L Ghirardi (France) S Pitkowski	6	7
2	(South Africa) A Coetzer (Argentina) M Paz	4	5

Quarterfinals
1	(United States) K Adams (Netherlands) M Bollegraf
(Canada) M Bernard (Canada) C Delisle	w/o
4	(United States) L Harvey-Wild (United States) C Rubin	6	6
(Georgia (country)) N Louarsabishvili (United States) L Poruri	3	2
(United States) Ra Jensen (United States) Re Jensen	2	0
3	(South Africa) E Reinach (France) N Tauziat	6	6
(France) S Amiach (France) I Demongeot	6	6
Q	(France) L Ghirardi (France) S Pitkowski	2	3

Semifinals
(Canada) M Bernard (Canada) C Delisle	6^{2}	6	6^{1}
4	(United States) L Harvey-Wild (United States) C Rubin	7^{7}	3	7^{7}
3	(South Africa) E Reinach (France) N Tauziat	7^{8}	6
(France) S Amiach (France) I Demongeot	6^{6}	3

Final
4	(United States) L Harvey-Wild (United States) C Rubin	4	3
3	(South Africa) E Reinach (France) N Tauziat	6	6
