= 1995 Challenge Bell – Singles =

Singles
- 1995 Challenge Bell

Final
- Champion: (Netherlands) Brenda Schultz-McCarthy
- Runner-up: (Belgium) Dominique Monami
- Score: 7–6^{(7–5)}, 6–2

Details
- Draw: 32 (3WC/4Q)
- Seeds: 8

Events
Singles	Doubles
← 1994 ·	Tournoi de Québec	· 1996 →

Katerina Maleeva was the defending champion, but lost in the first round to Sandrine Testud.

First-seeded and wild card Brenda Schultz-McCarthy won the title, defeating Dominique Monami 7–6^{(7–5)}, 6–2 in the final.

The tournament marked the debut of 14-year-old Serena Williams in the WTA Tour. Williams entered the qualifying round, losing in the first round to Annie Miller.

== Seeds ==
1. (Netherlands) Brenda Schultz-McCarthy (champion)
2. (South Africa) Amanda Coetzer (quarterfinals)
3. (United States) Lisa Raymond (second round)
4. (France) Nathalie Tauziat (second round)
5. (Mexico) Angélica Gavaldón (first round)
6. (France) Julie Halard (quarterfinals)
7. (Argentina) Inés Gorrochategui (second round)
8. (France) Sandrine Testud (quarterfinals)

== Draw ==
=== Key ===
- Q = Qualifier
- WC = Wild card
- LL = Lucky loser
- Alt = Alternate
- SE = Special exempt
- PR = Protected ranking
- ITF = ITF entry
- JE = Junior exempt
- w/o = Walkover
- r = Retired
- d = Defaulted
- SR = Special ranking

=== Finals ===
Semifinals
1/WC	(Netherlands) Brenda Schultz-McCarthy	6	6^{4}	7^{7}
(United States) Lindsay Lee	4	7^{7}	6^{4}
Q	(Australia) Rennae Stubbs	2	4
(Belgium) Dominique Monami	6	6

Final
1/WC	(Netherlands) Brenda Schultz-McCarthy	7^{7}	6
(Belgium) Dominique Monami	6^{5}	2

=== Top half ===
First round
1/WC	(Netherlands) B Schultz-McCarthy	1	6	6
(Canada) J Nejedly	6	2	4
(Belgium) E Callens	3	0
Q	(United States) M Tu	6	6
(Germany) P Begerow	0	3
(Spain) V Ruano Pascual	6	6
(Bulgaria) K Maleeva	4	2
8	(France) S Testud	6	6
4	(France) N Tauziat	6	7
(United States) E deLone	1	5
(Poland) K Nowak	1	6	4
(United States) L Lee	6	4	6
(Poland) M Grzybowska	4	2
Q	(United States) A Miller	6	6
(Latvia) L Neiland	6^{3}	2
6	(France) J Halard	7^{7}	6

Second round
1/WC	(Netherlands) B Schultz-McCarthy	6	6
Q	(United States) M Tu	2	4
(Spain) V Ruano Pascual	1	1
8	(France) S Testud	6	6
4	(France) N Tauziat	2	6	6^{5}
(United States) L Lee	6	4	7^{7}
Q	(United States) A Miller	3	6^{4}
6	(France) J Halard	6	7^{7}

Quarterfinals
1/WC	(Netherlands) B Schultz-McCarthy	6^{3}	7^{7}	6
8	(France) S Testud	7^{7}	6^{4}	4
(United States) L Lee	6	6
6	(France) J Halard	2	1

Semifinals
1/WC	(Netherlands) B Schultz-McCarthy	6	6^{4}	7^{7}
(United States) L Lee	4	7^{7}	6^{4}

=== Bottom half ===
First round
5	(Mexico) A Gavaldón	4	1
(Belgium) L Courtois	6	6
WC	(Canada) R Simpson	4	7^{7}	6
(Canada) P Hy-Boulais	6	6^{4}	2
(Argentina) MJ Gaidano	2	6^{9}
Q	(Australia) R Stubbs	6	7^{11}
(United States) N Arendt	2	4
3	(United States) L Raymond	6	6
7	(Argentina) I Gorrochategui	6	6
WC	(Canada) S Jeyaseelan	3	2
(Belgium) D Monami	7	7
(Italy) A Serra Zanetti	5	5
(United States) S Stafford	6	6
(Slovakia) J Husárová	4	4
Q	(Slovakia) K Studeníková	6	5	6^{4}
2	(South Africa) A Coetzer	3	7	7^{7}

Second round
(Belgium) L Courtois	6	6
WC	(Canada) R Simpson	4	3
Q	(Australia) R Stubbs	3	7^{13}	7^{8}
3	(United States) L Raymond	6	6^{11}	6^{6}
7	(Argentina) I Gorrochategui	3	2
(Belgium) D Monami	6	6
(United States) S Stafford	1	6	4
2	(South Africa) A Coetzer	6	3	6

Quarterfinals
(Belgium) L Courtois	3	4
Q	(Australia) R Stubbs	6	6
(Belgium) D Monami	6	7
2	(South Africa) A Coetzer	2	5

Semifinals
Q	(Australia) R Stubbs	2	4
(Belgium) D Monami	6	6

== Qualifying ==
=== Qualifying seeds ===
1. (Slovakia) Katarína Studeníková (qualified)
2. (Germany) Marketa Kochta (second round, retired)
3. (United States) Meilen Tu (qualified)
4. (Australia) Rennae Stubbs (qualified)
5. (France) Alexia Dechaume-Balleret (second round)
6. (United States) Audra Keller (second round)
7. (United States) Anne Miller (qualified)
8. (Germany) Andrea Glass (qualifying competition)

=== Qualifiers ===
1. (Slovakia) Katarína Studeníková
2. (United States) Meilen Tu
3. (Australia) Rennae Stubbs
4. (United States) Anne Miller

=== Qualifying draw ===
==== First qualifier ====
First round
1	(Slovakia) Katarína Studeníková	6	6
(Australia) Nicole Pratt	0	2
WC	(Canada) Linda Smaira	1	4
(United States) Alix Creek	6	6
(Argentina) Mercedes Paz	3	3
WC	(Russia) Anna Kournikova	6	6
(Italy) Gabriella Boschiero	6	2	2
8	(Germany) Andrea Glass	2	6	6

Second round
1	(Slovakia) Katarína Studeníková	6	6
(United States) Alix Creek	2	4
WC	(Russia) Anna Kournikova	7	1	3
8	(Germany) Andrea Glass	6	6	6

Qualifying competition
1	(Slovakia) Katarína Studeníková	6	7	7
8	(Germany) Andrea Glass	7	6	6

==== Second qualifier ====
First round
3	(United States) Meilen Tu	6	6
(Canada) Martina Nejedly	2	1
(United States) Mashona Washington	6	7
(Italy) Maria Paola Zavagli	3	5
(Canada) Mélanie Bernard	4	3
WC	(Canada) Cristina Popescu	6	6
(United States) Erica Adams	6	4
6	(United States) Audra Keller	7	6

Second round
3	(United States) Meilen Tu	6	7
(United States) Mashona Washington	2	6
WC	(Canada) Cristina Popescu	6	2	6
6	(United States) Audra Keller	1	6	4

Qualifying competition
3	(United States) Meilen Tu	6	6
WC	(Canada) Cristina Popescu	2	2

==== Third qualifier ====
First round
5	(France) Alexia Dechaume-Balleret	7	2	6
(Canada) Renata Kolbovic	6	6	3
(United States) Julie Steven	6	6
(Croatia) Maja Murić	3	3
(Netherlands) Caroline Vis	6	6
(Romania) Aurora Gima	3	0
(Austria) Elisabeth Habeler	3	2
4	(Australia) Rennae Stubbs	6	6

Second round
5	(France) Alexia Dechaume-Balleret	5	6
(United States) Julie Steven	7	7
(Netherlands) Caroline Vis	4	3
4	(Australia) Rennae Stubbs	6	6

Qualifying competition
(United States) Julie Steven	3	3
4	(Australia) Rennae Stubbs	6	6

==== Fourth qualifier ====
First round
7	(United States) Anne Miller	6	6
WC	(United States) Serena Williams	1	1
(Canada) Vanessa Webb	6	6
(United States) Diana Valenti	0	0
(Italy) Francesca Lubiani	6	6
(Canada) Caroline Delisle	4	2
(United States) Janet Lee	3	4
2	(Germany) Marketa Kochta	6	6

Second round
7	(United States) Anne Miller	7	6
(Canada) Vanessa Webb	6	2
(Italy) Francesca Lubiani	6	4
2	(Germany) Marketa Kochta	1	2^{r}

Qualifying competition
7	(United States) Anne Miller	6	6
(Italy) Francesca Lubiani	3	0
