= 1993 Challenge Bell – Doubles =

Doubles
- 1993 Challenge Bell

Final
- Champions: (United States) Katrina Adams; (Netherlands) Manon Bollegraf
- Runners-up: (Bulgaria) Katerina Maleeva; (France) Nathalie Tauziat
- Score: 6–4, 6–4

Details
- Draw: 16
- Seeds: 4

Events
Singles	Doubles
Tournoi de Québec	· 1994 →

Katrina Adams and Manon Bollegraf won the first edition of the tournament, defeating Katerina Maleeva and Nathalie Tauziat 6–4, 6–4 in the final.

== Seeds ==
1. (United States) Katrina Adams / (Netherlands) Manon Bollegraf (champions)
2. (United States) Debbie Graham / (Netherlands) Brenda Schultz (semifinals)
3. (Bulgaria) Katerina Maleeva / (France) Nathalie Tauziat (final)
4. (United States) Linda Harvey-Wild / (United States) Lisa Raymond (semifinals)

== Draw ==
=== Key ===
- Q = Qualifier
- WC = Wild card
- LL = Lucky loser
- Alt = Alternate
- SE = Special exempt
- PR = Protected ranking
- ITF = ITF entry
- JE = Junior exempt
- w/o = Walkover
- r = Retired
- d = Defaulted
- SR = Special ranking

First round

Quarterfinals

Semifinals

Final

1
(United States) K Adams
(Netherlands) M Bollegraf
7^{7}
6

- (United States) S Collins
- (United States) C Rubin
6^{4}
0

1
(United States) K Adams
(Netherlands) M Bollegraf
7
6

- (United States) A Keller
- (Germany) S Meier
2
4

- (United States) M Jackson-Nobrega
- (Venezuela) M Mazzotta
5
2

(United States) M Jackson-Nobrega
(Venezuela) M Mazzotta
6
6

1
(United States) K Adams
(Netherlands) M Bollegraf
6
6

4
(United States) L Harvey-Wild
(United States) L Raymond
6
6

4
- (United States) L Harvey-Wild
- (United States) L Raymond
4
1

LL
- (Romania) A Gima
- (Peru) P Vásquez
2
0

4
(United States) L Harvey-Wild
(United States) L Raymond
6
6

Q
- (United States) D Faber
- (Mexico) A Gavaldón
5
4

- (United States) E Adams
- (United States) J Ingram
4
1

(United States) E Adams
(United States) J Ingram
7
6

1
(United States) K Adams
(Netherlands) M Bollegraf
6
6

(Australia) T Morton
(Slovakia) D Szabová
0
6
6

3
- (Bulgaria) K Maleeva
- (France) N Tauziat
4
4

- (Canada) M Bernard
- (Canada) C Delisle
6
2
4

- (Australia) T Morton-Rodgers
- (Slovakia) D Szabová
2
4

- (South Africa) M de Swardt
- (United States) C MacGregor
6^{4}
2

3
(Bulgaria) K Maleeva
(France) N Tauziat
6
6

3
(Bulgaria) K Maleeva
(France) N Tauziat
7^{7}
6

3
(Bulgaria) K Maleeva
(France) N Tauziat
3
6
6

- (Canada) S Jeyaseelan
- (Canada) H Kelesi
3
2

2
- (United States) D Graham
- (Netherlands) B Schultz
6
3
4

(Canada) P Hy
(Canada) R Simpson-Alter
6
6

- (Canada) P Hy
- (Canada) R Simpson-Alter
4
5

- (Canada) M Drake
- (United States) D Scott
6^{10}
4

2
(United States) D Graham
(Netherlands) B Schultz
6
7

2
(United States) D Graham
(Netherlands) B Schultz
7^{12}
6
