= 1994 Challenge Bell – Singles =

Singles
- 1994 Challenge Bell

Final
- Champion: (Bulgaria) Katerina Maleeva
- Runner-up: (Netherlands) Brenda Schultz
- Score: 6–3, 6–3

Details
- Draw: 32
- Seeds: 8

Events
Singles	Doubles
← 1993 ·	Tournoi de Québec	· 1995 →

Nathalie Tauziat was the defending champion, but lost in the semifinals to Brenda Schultz.

Katerina Maleeva won the title, defeating Schultz 6–3, 6–3 in the final.

== Seeds ==
1. (South Africa) Amanda Coetzer (quarterfinals)
2. (Netherlands) Brenda Schultz (final)
3. (United States) Chanda Rubin (semifinals)
4. (France) Nathalie Tauziat (semifinals)
5. (Bulgaria) Katerina Maleeva (champion)
6. (United States) Linda Harvey-Wild (quarterfinals)
7. (Canada) Patricia Hy (quarterfinals)
8. (South Africa) Elna Reinach (quarterfinals)

== Draw ==
=== Key ===
- Q = Qualifier
- WC = Wild card
- LL = Lucky loser
- Alt = Alternate
- SE = Special exempt
- PR = Protected ranking
- ITF = ITF entry
- JE = Junior exempt
- w/o = Walkover
- r = Retired
- d = Defaulted
- SR = Special ranking

=== Finals ===
Semifinals
5	(Bulgaria) Katerina Maleeva	4	6	6
3	(United States) Chanda Rubin	6	4	3
4	(France) Nathalie Tauziat	4	7^{8}	4
2	(Netherlands) Brenda Schultz	6	6^{6}	6

Final
5	(Bulgaria) Katerina Maleeva	6	6
2	(Netherlands) Brenda Schultz	3	3

=== Top half ===
First round
1	(South Africa) A Coetzer	5	7^{7}	6
Q	(Venezuela) M Vento	7	6^{1}	2
(Argentina) M Paz	6	6
Q	(United States) E Adams	1	1
(United States) M Jackson-Nobrega	6	6
(United States) J Steven	2	1
(France) I Demongeot	3	2
5	(Bulgaria) K Maleeva	6	6
3	(United States) C Rubin	6	6
Q	(Georgia (country)) N Louarsabishvili	4	1
(United States) A Keller	4	6	2
(Netherlands) M Bollegraf	6	3	6
(France) L Ghirardi	6^{5}	6	6
Q	(United States) E deLone	7^{7}	4	0
(Mexico) A Gavaldón	4	4
7	(Canada) P Hy	6	6

Second round
1	(South Africa) A Coetzer	6	6
(Argentina) M Paz	3	1
(United States) M Jackson-Nobrega	5	1
5	(Bulgaria) K Maleeva	7	6
3	(United States) C Rubin	6	6
(Netherlands) M Bollegraf	3	4
(France) L Ghirardi	3	5
7	(Canada) P Hy	6	7

Quarterfinals
1	(South Africa) A Coetzer	4	7	5
5	(Bulgaria) K Maleeva	6	5	7
3	(United States) C Rubin	6	7
7	(Canada) P Hy	4	6

Semifinals
5	(Bulgaria) K Maleeva	4	6	6
3	(United States) C Rubin	6	4	3

=== Bottom half ===
First round
8	(South Africa) E Reinach	4	6	6
(Canada) J Nejedly	6	2	3
WC	(Canada) S Jeyaseelan	7	1
(United States) S Reece	5	0^{r}
(Germany) S Meier	1	3
(France) S Pitkowski	6	6
(France) K Quentrec	6^{2}	2
4	(France) N Tauziat	7^{7}	6
6	(United States) L Harvey-Wild	6	7^{7}
LL	(United States) L Poruri	0	6^{2}
(Belgium) L Courtois	7^{7}	2	6
(Austria) B Reinstadler	6^{4}	6	4
WC	(Canada) C Delisle	3	6	2
(Canada) M Drake	6	2	6
(Germany) M Živec-Škulj	2	3
2	(Netherlands) B Schultz	6	6

Second round
8	(South Africa) E Reinach	4	6	7
WC	(Canada) S Jeyaseelan	6	2	5
(France) S Pitkowski	3	7^{11}	3
4	(France) N Tauziat	6	6^{9}	6
6	(United States) L Harvey-Wild	6	6
(Belgium) L Courtois	0	2
(Canada) M Drake	4	6	3
2	(Netherlands) B Schultz	6	3	6

Quarterfinals
8	(South Africa) E Reinach	4	4
4	(France) N Tauziat	6	6
6	(United States) L Harvey-Wild	6^{5}	6	4
2	(Netherlands) B Schultz	7^{7}	3	6

Semifinals
4	(France) N Tauziat	4	7^{8}	4
2	(Netherlands) B Schultz	6	6^{6}	6
