= 1993 Challenge Bell – Singles =

Singles
- 1993 Challenge Bell

Final
- Champion: (France) Nathalie Tauziat
- Runner-up: (Bulgaria) Katerina Maleeva
- Score: 6–4, 6–1

Details
- Draw: 32
- Seeds: 8

Events
Singles	Doubles
Tournoi de Québec	· 1994 →

Nathalie Tauziat won the first edition of the tournament, defeating Katerina Maleeva 6–4, 6–1 in the final.

== Seeds ==
1. (Czech Republic) Helena Suková (second round)
2. (Belarus) Natasha Zvereva (quarterfinals)
3. (France) Nathalie Tauziat (champion)
4. (Bulgaria) Katerina Maleeva (final)
5. (United States) Pam Shriver (second round)
6. (Netherlands) Brenda Schultz (first round)
7. (United States) Gigi Fernández (first round)
8. (United States) Linda Harvey-Wild (quarterfinals)

== Draw ==
=== Key ===
- Q = Qualifier
- WC = Wild card
- LL = Lucky loser
- Alt = Alternate
- SE = Special exempt
- PR = Protected ranking
- ITF = ITF entry
- JE = Junior exempt
- w/o = Walkover
- r = Retired
- d = Defaulted
- SR = Special ranking

=== Finals ===
Semifinals
(Canada) Patricia Hy	3	2
4	(Bulgaria) Katerina Maleeva	6	6
3	(France) Nathalie Tauziat	6	1
(Canada) Helen Kelesi	1	0^{r}

Final
4	(Bulgaria) Katerina Maleeva	4	1
3	(France) Nathalie Tauziat	6	6

=== Top half ===
First round
1	(Czech Republic) H Suková	6	6
Q	(Canada) S Tibbits	2	1
Q	(United States) A Creek	6^{4}	5
(Canada) P Hy	7^{7}	7
Q	(Australia) R Stubbs	6	2	6
(South Africa) M de Swardt	1	6	2
(United States) D Graham	7	6
6	(Netherlands) B Schultz	5	3
4	(Bulgaria) K Maleeva	6	6
(Germany) P Begerow	1	1
Q	(United States) S Collins	0	2
(United States) L Raymond	6	6
(United States) L Allen	4	3
(Mexico) A Gavaldón	6	6
(United States) E deLone	4	6	6
7	(United States) G Fernández	6	4	4

Second round
1	(Czech Republic) H Suková	4	7	5
(Canada) P Hy	6	5	7
Q	(Australia) R Stubbs	2	3
(United States) D Graham	6	6
4	(Bulgaria) K Maleeva	3	6	6
(United States) L Raymond	6	2	2
(Mexico) A Gavaldón	6	7
(United States) E deLone	1	5

Quarterfinals
(Canada) P Hy	6	6
(United States) D Graham	3	1
4	(Bulgaria) K Maleeva	6	6
(Mexico) A Gavaldón	2	2

Semifinals
(Canada) P Hy	3	2
4	(Bulgaria) K Maleeva	6	6

=== Bottom half ===
First round
8	(United States) L Harvey-Wild	6	6^{1}	6
(United States) K Adams	4	7^{7}	4
(United States) C Rubin	6	6
(United States) J Emmons	2	1
(Netherlands) M Bollegraf	4	2
(Canada) M Drake	6	6
WC	(Canada) S Jeyaseelan	3	1
3	(France) N Tauziat	6	6
5	(United States) P Shriver	6	4	6
(United States) A Keller	4	6	1
(Romania) R Dragomir	1	5
(Canada) H Kelesi	6	7
WC	(Canada) C Delisle	6	2	7^{7}
(Australia) E Smylie	4	6	6^{3}
(Germany) S Meier	0	2
2	(Belarus) N Zvereva	6	6

Second round
8	(United States) L Harvey-Wild	6	7
(United States) C Rubin	1	5
(Canada) M Drake	4	5
3	(France) N Tauziat	6	7
5	(United States) P Shriver	6	6^{3}	3
(Canada) H Kelesi	3	7^{7}	6
WC	(Canada) C Delisle	1	4
2	(Belarus) N Zvereva	6	6

Quarterfinals
8	(United States) L Harvey-Wild	3	3
3	(France) N Tauziat	6	6
(Canada) H Kelesi	3	7^{7}	6
2	(Belarus) N Zvereva	6	6^{5}	0

Semifinals
3	(France) N Tauziat	6	1
(Canada) H Kelesi	1	0^{r}
