= 1995 Challenge Bell – Doubles =

Doubles
- 1995 Challenge Bell

Final
- Champions: (United States) Nicole Arendt (Netherlands) Manon Bollegraf
- Runners-up: (United States) Lisa Raymond (Australia) Rennae Stubbs
- Score: 7–6^{(8–6)}, 4–6, 6–2

Details
- Draw: 16
- Seeds: 4

Events
Singles	Doubles
← 1994 ·	Tournoi de Québec	· 1996 →

Elna Reinach and Nathalie Tauziat were the defending champions, but Reinach decided not to participate this year. Tauziat partnered with Julie Halard, but lost in the first round to Dominique Van Roost and Maja Murić.

Nicole Arendt and Manon Bollegraf won the title, defeating Lisa Raymond and Rennae Stubbs 7–6^{(8–6)}, 4–6, 6–2 in the final.

== Seeds ==
1. (United States) Nicole Arendt / (Netherlands) Manon Bollegraf (champions)
2. (United States) Lisa Raymond / (Australia) Rennae Stubbs (final)
3. (France) Julie Halard / (France) Nathalie Tauziat (first round)
4. (South Africa) Amanda Coetzer / (Argentina) Inés Gorrochategui (first round)

== Draw ==
=== Key ===
- Q = Qualifier
- WC = Wild card
- LL = Lucky loser
- Alt = Alternate
- SE = Special exempt
- PR = Protected ranking
- ITF = ITF entry
- JE = Junior exempt
- w/o = Walkover
- r = Retired
- d = Defaulted
- SR = Special ranking

First round
1	(United States) N Arendt (Netherlands) M Bollegraf	6	6
(United States) E deLone (United States) A Keller	3	2
(Australia) N Pratt (United States) M Tu	3	1
(Canada) M Bernard (Canada) C Delisle	6	6
3	(France) J Halard (France) N Tauziat	5	4
(Belgium) D Monami (Croatia) M Murić	7	6
Q	(United States) L Lee (United States) S Stafford	3	6	6
(United States) J Lee (Georgia (country)) N Louarsabishvili	6	4	1
(Argentina) M Paz (Canada) R Simpson	6^{2}	6	2
(Poland) M Grzybowska (Slovakia) K Studeníková	7^{7}	4	6
(France) A Dechaume-Balleret (France) S Testud	7	6
4	(South Africa) A Coetzer (Argentina) I Gorrochategui	5	1
(Belgium) E Callens (Belgium) L Courtois	6	6
WC	(Canada) S Jeyaseelan (Canada) J Nejedly	2	2
(Netherlands) B Schultz-McCarthy (United States) J Steven	1	4
2	(United States) L Raymond (Australia) R Stubbs	6	6

Quarterfinals
1	(United States) N Arendt (Netherlands) M Bollegraf	4	6	6
(Canada) M Bernard (Canada) C Delisle	6	4	3
(Belgium) D Monami (Croatia) M Murić	6	6
Q	(United States) L Lee (United States) S Stafford	3	3
(Poland) M Grzybowska (Slovakia) K Studeníková	3	2
(France) A Dechaume-Balleret (France) S Testud	6	6
(Belgium) E Callens (Belgium) L Courtois	3	4
2	(United States) L Raymond (Australia) R Stubbs	6	6

Semifinals
1	(United States) N Arendt (Netherlands) M Bollegraf	6	6^{5}	6
(Belgium) D Monami (Croatia) M Murić	3	7^{7}	0
(France) A Dechaume-Balleret (France) S Testud	3	3
2	(United States) L Raymond (Australia) R Stubbs	6	6

Final
1	(United States) N Arendt (Netherlands) M Bollegraf	7^{8}	4	6
2	(United States) L Raymond (Australia) R Stubbs	6^{6}	6	2
