= 1994 US Open – Women's singles qualifying =

Women's singles qualifying
- 1994 US Open

Events
Singles	men	women		boys	girls
Doubles	men	women	mixed	boys	girls
WC Singles	men	women	quad
WC Doubles	men	women	quad
Legends	men	women	mixed

Qualification
Singles	men	women
- US Open

Players who neither had high enough rankings nor received wild cards to enter the main draw of the annual US Open Tennis Championships participated in a qualifying tournament held over several days before the event.

== Seeds ==
1. (Italy) Nathalie Baudone (qualifying competition)
2. (Belarus) Tatiana Ignatieva (second round)
3. (Slovenia) Tina Križan (qualifying competition)
4. (Ukraine) Elena Brioukhovets (qualified)
5. (France) Karine Quentrec (first round)
6. (Belgium) Els Callens (first round)
7. (Spain) María Sánchez Lorenzo (first round)
8. (Netherlands) Caroline Vis (qualifying competition)
9. (Hungary) Andrea Temesvári (qualified)
10. (Japan) Nana Smith (qualifying competition)
11. (Japan) Naoko Kijimuta (second round)
12. (Australia) Jenny Byrne (qualifying competition)
13. (Argentina) María José Gaidano (qualified)
14. (Japan) Misumi Miyauchi (first round)
15. (Canada) Jana Nejedly (second round)
16. (Romania) Cătălina Cristea (second round)

== Qualifiers ==
1. (Hungary) Andrea Temesvári
2. (Argentina) María José Gaidano
3. (Ukraine) Elena Brioukhovets
4. (France) Lea Ghirardi
5. (France) Isabelle Demongeot
6. (Japan) Rika Hiraki
7. (South Africa) Dianne Van Rensburg
8. (South Africa) Mariaan de Swardt

== Qualifying draw ==
Key

- Q = Qualifier
- WC = Wild card
- LL = Lucky loser
- Alt = Alternate
- ITF = ITF entry
- PR = Protected ranking
- SR = Special ranking
- SE = Special exempt
- JE = Junior exempt
- JR = Junior Accelerator Programme entrant
- CO = College Accelerator Programme entrant
- NG = Next Gen Accelerator Program entrant
- w/o = Walkover
- r = Retired
- d = Defaulted

=== First qualifier ===
First round
1	(Italy) Nathalie Baudone	6	6
(Italy) Laura Garrone	2	1
(Italy) Elena Savoldi	6	6
(Brazil) Andrea Vieira	3	4
(Australia) Louise Field	3	2
(Italy) Rita Grande	6	6
(Australia) Kristin Godridge	6^{4}	2
9	(Hungary) Andrea Temesvári	7^{7}	6

Second round
1	(Italy) Nathalie Baudone	6	6
(Italy) Elena Savoldi	3	1
(Italy) Rita Grande	6	2	3
9	(Hungary) Andrea Temesvári	4	6	6

Qualifying competition
1	(Italy) Nathalie Baudone	1	7	4
9	(Hungary) Andrea Temesvári	6	5	6

=== Second qualifier ===
First round
13	(Argentina) María José Gaidano	6	4	6
WC	(United States) Janet Lee	3	6	2
(Canada) Maureen Drake	2	3
(Sweden) Maria Strandlund	6	6
(Australia) Rennae Stubbs	6	6
(United States) Ann Henricksson	2	3
WC	(United States) Stephanie Mabry	6	6
5	(France) Karine Quentrec	2	4

Second round
13	(Argentina) María José Gaidano	7^{7}	6
(Sweden) Maria Strandlund	6^{5}	1
(Australia) Rennae Stubbs	6	7^{13}
WC	(United States) Stephanie Mabry	3	6^{11}

Qualifying competition
13	(Argentina) María José Gaidano	7^{7}	6
(Australia) Rennae Stubbs	6^{4}	1

=== Third qualifier ===
First round
4	(Ukraine) Elena Brioukhovets	7	6
(United States) Alix Creek	5	2
(Netherlands) Claire Wegink	1	3
(United States) Erika deLone	6	6
WC	(United States) Anne Miller	6	6
(Australia) Nicole Pratt	4	4
(United States) Eleni Rossides	5	6	6^{5}
16	(Romania) Cătălina Cristea	7	3	7^{7}

Second round
4	(Ukraine) Elena Brioukhovets	6	7^{7}
(United States) Erika deLone	2	6^{1}
WC	(United States) Anne Miller	6	6
16	(Romania) Cătălina Cristea	2	1

Qualifying competition
4	(Ukraine) Elena Brioukhovets	6	6
WC	(United States) Anne Miller	2	2

=== Fourth qualifier ===
First round
12	(Australia) Jenny Byrne	7^{7}	7^{7}
(France) Nathalie Herreman	6^{1}	6^{3}
(United States) Michelle Jackson-Nobrega	1	3
(Germany) Anca Barna	6	6
(Venezuela) María Vento	7	6^{9}	7^{7}
(Venezuela) Melissa Mazzotta	5	7^{11}	6^{3}
(France) Lea Ghirardi	6	7
7	(Spain) María Sánchez Lorenzo	3	5

Second round
12	(Australia) Jenny Byrne	6	1
(Germany) Anca Barna	1	0^{r}
(Venezuela) María Vento	2	0
(France) Lea Ghirardi	6	6

Qualifying competition
12	(Australia) Jenny Byrne	6	5	3
(France) Lea Ghirardi	3	7	6

=== Fifth qualifier ===
First round
6	(Belgium) Els Callens	6	4	2
(France) Isabelle Demongeot	1	6	6
(Spain) Eva Jiménez	2	2
(Canada) Rene Simpson	6	6
(United States) Elly Hakami	2	6	0
(Argentina) Mercedes Paz	6	4	6
(Netherlands) Kim de Weille	2	6	3
15	(Canada) Jana Nejedly	6	3	6

Second round
(France) Isabelle Demongeot	4	6	6
(Canada) Rene Simpson	6	3	3
(Argentina) Mercedes Paz	6	6
15	(Canada) Jana Nejedly	3	2

Qualifying competition
(France) Isabelle Demongeot	6	6
(Argentina) Mercedes Paz	4	0

=== Sixth qualifier ===
First round
14	(Japan) Misumi Miyauchi	1	1
(Japan) Rika Hiraki	6	6
(France) Sarah Pitkowski-Malcor	6	6
(Austria) Sylvia Plischke	3	1
(Canada) Sonya Jeyaseelan	5	4
WC	(United States) Amanda Basica	7	6
(Japan) Ei Iida	2	1
3	(Slovenia) Tina Križan	6	6

Second round
(Japan) Rika Hiraki	6	6
(France) Sarah Pitkowski-Malcor	4	3
WC	(United States) Amanda Basica	4	3
3	(Slovenia) Tina Križan	6	6

Qualifying competition
(Japan) Rika Hiraki	7^{7}	5	6
3	(Slovenia) Tina Križan	6^{2}	7	4

=== Seventh qualifier ===
First round
8	(Netherlands) Caroline Vis	6	7
WC	(United States) Tina Samara	3	5
WC	(United States) Erica Adams	6	6
(Paraguay) Larissa Schaerer	2	1
WC	(United States) Shannan McCarthy	3	5
(South Africa) Dianne Van Rensburg	6	7
(United Kingdom) Julie Pullin	3	1
11	(Japan) Naoko Kijimuta	6	6

Second round
8	(Netherlands) Caroline Vis	7^{7}	6
WC	(United States) Erica Adams	6^{5}	3
(South Africa) Dianne Van Rensburg	6^{6}	7	7^{8}
11	(Japan) Naoko Kijimuta	7^{8}	5	6^{6}

Qualifying competition
8	(Netherlands) Caroline Vis	4	2
(South Africa) Dianne Van Rensburg	6	6

=== Eighth qualifier ===
First round
10	(Japan) Nana Smith	6	6
(Spain) Silvia Ramón-Cortés	0	2
WC	(United States) Mashona Washington	6	6
(Italy) Federica Fortuni	1	3
(South Africa) Mariaan de Swardt	6	6
(Czechoslovakia) Pavlína Rajzlová	4	1
(Australia) Michelle Jaggard-Lai	6^{2}	3
2	(Belarus) Tatiana Ignatieva	7^{7}	6

Second round
10	(Japan) Nana Smith	6	6
WC	(United States) Mashona Washington	3	3
(South Africa) Mariaan de Swardt	6	4	6
2	(Belarus) Tatiana Ignatieva	3	6	1

Qualifying competition
10	(Japan) Nana Smith	2	2
(South Africa) Mariaan de Swardt	6	6
