= 1993 Challenge Bell =

- Date: November 1–7
- Edition: 1st
- Category: WTA Tier III
- Draw: 32S (25Q) / 16D (0Q)
- Prize money: US$150,000
- Surface: Carpet – indoors
- Location: Quebec City, Canada
- Venue: Club Avantage Multi-Sports

Champions

Singles
- (France) Nathalie Tauziat

Doubles
- (United States) Katrina Adams / (Netherlands) Manon Bollegraf
Tournoi de Québec	· 1994 →

The 1993 Challenge Bell was a women's tennis tournament played on indoor carpet courts at the Club Avantage Multi-Sports in Quebec City in Canada that was part of Tier III of the 1993 WTA Tour. It was the 1st edition of the Challenge Bell, and was held from November 1 through November 7, 1993. Third-seeded Nathalie Tauziat won the singles title.

== Finals ==
=== Singles ===
(France) Nathalie Tauziat defeated (Bulgaria) Katerina Maleeva, 6–4, 6–1

- It was Tauziat's only singles title of the year and the 2nd of her career.

=== Doubles ===
(United States) Katrina Adams / (Netherlands) Manon Bollegraf defeated (Bulgaria) Katerina Maleeva / (France) Nathalie Tauziat, 6–4, 6–4

- It was Adam's 3rd title of the year and the 16th of her career. It was Bollegraf's 2nd title of the year and the 11th of her career.
