= 1994 Challenge Bell =

Tennis tournament

- Date: October 31 – November 6
- Edition: 2nd
- Category: WTA Tier III
- Draw: 32S (32Q) / 16D (0Q)
- Prize money: US$150,000
- Surface: Carpet – indoors
- Location: Quebec City, Canada
- Venue: Club Avantage Multi-Sports

Champions

Singles
- (Bulgaria) Katerina Maleeva

Doubles
- (South Africa) Elna Reinach / (France) Nathalie Tauziat
| ← 1993 · | Tournoi de Québec | · 1995 → |

The 1994 Challenge Bell was a women's tennis tournament played on indoor carpet courts at the Club Avantage Multi-Sports in Quebec City in Canada that was part of Tier III of the 1994 WTA Tour. It was the 2nd edition of the Challenge Bell, and was held from October 31 through November 6, 1994. Fifth-seeded Katerina Maleeva won the singles title.

== Finals ==
=== Singles ===
(Bulgaria) Katerina Maleeva defeated (Netherlands) Brenda Schultz, 6–3, 6–3

- It was Maleeva's only singles title of the year and the 11th and last of her career.

=== Doubles ===
(South Africa) Elna Reinach / (France) Nathalie Tauziat defeated (United States) Linda Harvey-Wild / (United States) Chanda Rubin, 6–4, 6–3

- It was Reinach's only title of the year and the 18th of her career. It was Tauziat's 2nd title of the year and the 9th of her career.
