= Danielle Scott =

Danielle Scott may refer to:

- Danielle Scott (freestyle skier) (born 1990), Australian freestyle skier
- Danielle Scott (tennis) (born 1970), American tennis player
- Danielle Scott-Arruda (born 1972), American volleyball player
- Danielle Scott, American National Basketball Association referee
