= 1995 Challenge Bell =

- Date: October 30 – November 5
- Edition: 3rd
- Category: WTA Tier III
- Draw: 32S / 16D
- Prize money: US$161,250
- Surface: Carpet / indoor
- Location: Quebec City, Canada
- Venue: Club Avantage Multi-Sports

Champions

Singles
- (Netherlands) Brenda Schultz-McCarthy

Doubles
- (United States) Nicole Arendt / (Netherlands) Manon Bollegraf
← 1994 ·	Tournoi de Québec	· 1996 →

The 1995 Challenge Bell was a women's tennis tournament played on indoor carpet courts at the Club Avantage Multi-Sports in Quebec City in Canada that was part of Tier III of the 1995 WTA Tour. It was the 3rd edition of the Challenge Bell, and was held from October 30 through November 5, 1995. First-seeded Brenda Schultz-McCarthy won the singles title.

== Finals ==
=== Singles ===
(Netherlands) Brenda Schultz-McCarthy defeated (Belgium) Dominique Monami, 7–6^{(7–5)}, 6–2

- It was Schultz-McCarthy's 2nd title of the year and the 5th of her career.

=== Doubles ===
(United States) Nicole Arendt / (Netherlands) Manon Bollegraf defeated (United States) Lisa Raymond / (Australia) Rennae Stubbs, 7–6^{(8–6)}, 4–6, 6–2

- It was Arendt's 5th title of the year and the 7th of her career. It was Bollegraf's 5th title of the year and the 20th of her career.
