= 1995 French Open – Women's doubles =

Women's doubles
- 1995 French Open

Final
- Champions: (United States) Gigi Fernández (Belarus) Natasha Zvereva
- Runners-up: (Czech Republic) Jana Novotná (Spain) Arantxa Sánchez Vicario
- Score: 6–7^{(6–8)}, 6–4, 7–5

Details
- Draw: 64 (4 WC )
- Seeds: 16

Events
Singles	men	women		boys	girls
Doubles	men	women	mixed	boys	girls
WC Singles	men	women	quad
WC Doubles	men	women	quad
Legends	−45	45+	women
← 1994 ·	French Open	· 1996 →

Gigi Fernández and Natasha Zvereva were the three-time defending champions, and successfully defended their title, defeating Jana Novotná and Arantxa Sánchez Vicario in the final 6–7^{(6–8)}, 6–4, 7–5. It was also Fernández’s 5th consecutive women’s doubles title at Roland Garros.

== Seeds ==
Champion seeds are indicated in bold text while text in italics indicates the round in which those seeds were eliminated.

1. (Czech Republic) Jana Novotná / (Spain) Arantxa Sánchez (final)
2. (United States) **Gigi Fernández** / (Belarus) **Natasha Zvereva (champions)**
3. (United States) Meredith McGrath / (Latvia) Larisa Neiland (third round)
4. (United States) Nicole Arendt / (United States) Lindsay Davenport (semifinals)
5. (United States) Patty Fendick / (United States) Mary Joe Fernández (semifinals)
6. (South Africa) Amanda Coetzer / (Argentina) Inés Gorrochategui (first round)
7. (Netherlands) Manon Bollegraf / (Australia) Rennae Stubbs (third round)
8. (Argentina) Gabriela Sabatini / (Netherlands) Brenda Schultz-McCarthy (third round)
9. (France) Julie Halard-Decugis / (France) Nathalie Tauziat (quarterfinals)
10. (Spain) Conchita Martínez / (Argentina) Patricia Tarabini (third round)
11. (South Africa) Elna Reinach / (Romania) Irina Spîrlea (quarterfinals)
12. (United States) Katrina Adams / (United States) Zina Garrison (quarterfinals)
13. (Italy) Laura Golarsa / (Netherlands) Caroline Vis (third round)
14. (Germany) Wiltrud Probst / (Canada) Rene Simpson (first round)
15. (Russia) Elena Makarova / (Russia) Eugenia Maniokova (quarterfinals)
16. (Netherlands) Kristie Boogert / (Netherlands) Nicole Muns-Jagerman (third round)

== Draw ==
=== Key ===
- Q = Qualifier
- WC = Wild card
- LL = Lucky loser
- Alt = Alternate
- SE = Special exempt
- PR = Protected ranking
- ITF = ITF entry
- JE = Junior exempt
- w/o = Walkover
- r = Retired
- d = Defaulted
- SR = Special ranking

=== Finals ===
Quarterfinals
1	(Czech Republic) Jana Novotná (Spain) Arantxa Sánchez	2	6	6
15	(Russia) Elena Makarova (Russia) Eugenia Maniokova	6	2	2
4	(United States) Nicole Arendt (United States) Lindsay Davenport	6	6
11	(South Africa) Elna Reinach (Romania) Irina Spîrlea	3	4
5	(United States) Patty Fendick (United States) Mary Joe Fernández	6	6
12	(United States) Katrina Adams (United States) Zina Garrison	4	0
9	(France) Julie Halard-Decugis (France) Nathalie Tauziat	6^{4}	6^{5}
2	(United States) Gigi Fernández (Belarus) Natasha Zvereva	7	7

Semifinals
1	(Czech Republic) Jana Novotná (Spain) Arantxa Sánchez	6	7
4	(United States) Nicole Arendt (United States) Lindsay Davenport	2	5
5	(United States) Patty Fendick (United States) Mary Joe Fernández	2	1
2	(United States) Gigi Fernández (Belarus) Natasha Zvereva	6	6

Final
1	(Czech Republic) Jana Novotná (Spain) Arantxa Sánchez	7	4	5
2	(United States) Gigi Fernández (Belarus) Natasha Zvereva	6^{6}	6	7

=== Top half ===
==== Section 1 ====
First round
1	(Czech Republic) J Novotná (Spain) A Sánchez	6	6
(United States) L McNeil (Czech Republic) H Suková	1	4
(Japan) H Nagano (South Korea) S-h Park	6	6
(Italy) L Garrone (Italy) F Perfetti	4	3
(Czech Republic) E Martincová (Bulgaria) E Wagner	6	6
(Italy) S Farina (Belgium) N Feber	3	4
10	(Spain) C Martínez (Argentina) P Tarabini	2
(Czech Republic) K Kroupová (Slovakia) K Studenikova	2^{r}
15	(Russia) E Makarova (Russia) E Maniokova	6^{8}	6	6
(Belgium) E Callens (United States) D Scott	7	4	4
(South Africa) J Kruger (Croatia) I Majoli	6	6
(Italy) S Cecchini (France) I Demongeot	2	4
(Australia) N Bradtke (Australia) K Kunce	3	6	6
(Italy) R Grande (Austria) P Schwarz	6	2	3
(United States) A Frazier (United States) K Po	3	7	6
6	(South Africa) A Coetzer (Argentina) I Gorrochategui	6	5	2

Second round
1	(Czech Republic) J Novotná (Spain) A Sánchez	6	6
(Japan) H Nagano (South Korea) S-h Park	0	1
(Czech Republic) E Martincová (Bulgaria) E Wagner	5	1
10	(Spain) C Martínez (Argentina) P Tarabini	7	6
15	(Russia) E Makarova (Russia) E Maniokova	6	6
(South Africa) J Kruger (Croatia) I Majoli	3	3
(Australia) N Bradtke (Australia) K Kunce	4	2
(United States) A Frazier (United States) K Po	6	6

Third round
1	(Czech Republic) J Novotná (Spain) A Sánchez	6	6
10	(Spain) C Martínez (Argentina) P Tarabini	4	2
15	(Russia) E Makarova (Russia) E Maniokova	6	4	6
(United States) A Frazier (United States) K Po	4	6	4

Quarterfinals
1	(Czech Republic) J Novotná (Spain) A Sánchez	2	6	6
15	(Russia) E Makarova (Russia) E Maniokova	6	2	2

==== Section 2 ====
First round
4	(United States) N Arendt (United States) L Davenport	6	6
(Ukraine) O Lugina (United Kingdom) C Wood	4	3
(Slovakia) K Habšudová (Slovakia) R Zrubáková	1	6	6
(Hong Kong) K Godridge (Australia) K Sharpe	6	3	4
(Finland) N Dahlman (Austria) K Kschwendt	7	6
(United States) L Horn (Belgium) D Monami	5	2
13	(Italy) L Golarsa (Netherlands) C Vis	2	7	6
(Argentina) M Paz (United States) S Stafford	6	6^{4}	3
11	(South Africa) E Reinach (Romania) I Spîrlea	7	6
(Australia) K-A Guse (United Kingdom) V Lake	5	4
(Sweden) M Lindström (Sweden) M Strandlund	6	6
(Bulgaria) K Maleeva (Ukraine) N Medvedeva	4	4
(Australia) C Barclay (Slovakia) J Husárová	6	6
(United States) M Werdel-Witmeyer (United States) T Whitlinger-Jones	3	0
7	(Netherlands) M Bollegraf (Australia) R Stubbs	6	7
(Belgium) S Appelmans (Netherlands) M Oremans	1	6^{4}

Second round
4	(United States) N Arendt (United States) L Davenport	6	6
(Slovakia) K Habšudová (Slovakia) R Zrubáková	3	0
(Finland) N Dahlman (Austria) K Kschwendt	1	5
13	(Italy) L Golarsa (Netherlands) C Vis	6	7
11	(South Africa) E Reinach (Romania) I Spîrlea	6	6
(Sweden) M Lindström (Sweden) M Strandlund	1	3
(Australia) C Barclay (Slovakia) Janette Husárová	4	5
7	(Netherlands) M Bollegraf (Australia) R Stubbs	6	7

Third round
4	(United States) N Arendt (United States) L Davenport	6	6
13	(Italy) L Golarsa (Netherlands) C Vis	4	4
11	(South Africa) E Reinach (Romania) I Spîrlea	7	4	6
7	(Netherlands) M Bollegraf (Australia) R Stubbs	6^{4}	6	1

Quarterfinals
4	(United States) N Arendt (United States) L Davenport	6	6
11	(South Africa) E Reinach (Romania) I Spîrlea	3	4

=== Bottom half ===
==== Section 3 ====
First round
5	(United States) P Fendick (United States) MJ Fernandez	2	6	6
WC	(France) N Dechy (France) A Mauresmo	6	2	4
(France) A Dechaume-Balleret (Argentina) F Labat	7	6
(Japan) Y Kamio (Japan) N Kijimuta	6^{5}	4
(Japan) K Nagatsuka (Japan) A Sugiyama	1	6	6
(United States) L Poruri (United States) M Tu	6	4	0
16	(Netherlands) K Boogert (Netherlands) N Muns-Jagerman	6	6
(South Africa) M de Swardt (Romania) R Dragomir	2	1
12	(United States) K Adams (United States) Z Garrison	7	7
(France) S Amiach (United States) V Paynter	6^{5}	6^{6}
(Sweden) Å Carlsson (France) A Fusai	6	7
(United States) S Graham (Canada) J Hetherington	4	5
(United States) L Wild (United States) C Rubin	6
(Canada) P Hy-Boulais (Australia) R McQuillan	1^{r}
3	(United States) M McGrath (Latvia) L Neiland	6	6
(Indonesia) Y Basuki (Japan) N Miyagi	2	1

Second round
5	(United States) P Fendick (United States) MJ Fernandez	6^{8}	6	6
(France) A Dechaume-Balleret (Argentina) F Labat	7	3	1
(Japan) K Nagatsuka (Japan) A Sugiyama	4	1
16	(Netherlands) K Boogert (Netherlands) N Muns-Jagerman	6	6
12	(United States) K Adams (United States) Z Garrison	7	6
(Sweden) Å Carlsson (France) A Fusai	5	1
(United States) L Wild (United States) C Rubin	2	5
3	(United States) M McGrath (Latvia) L Neiland	6	7

Third round
5	(United States) P Fendick (United States) MJ Fernandez	6	7
16	(Netherlands) K Boogert (Netherlands) N Muns-Jagerman	4	6^{3}
12	(United States) K Adams (United States) Z Garrison	6	6
3	(United States) M McGrath (Latvia) L Neiland	3	4

Quarterfinals
5	(United States) P Fendick (United States) MJ Fernandez	6	6
12	(United States) K Adams (United States) Z Garrison	4	0

==== Section 4 ====
First round
8	(Argentina) G Sabatini (Netherlands) B Schultz-McCarthy	6	6
WC	(France) L Ghirardi (France) S Pitkowski	4	2
(Russia) E Likhovtseva (Germany) C Singer	6	5	6
(Belgium) L Courtois (United States) A Grossman	4	7	2
(Czech Republic) E Melicharová (Czech Republic) H Vildová	6	6
(Hungary) A Temesvári (France) N Van Lottum	3	2
9	(France) J Halard-Decugis (France) N Tauziat	6	6
(Germany) M Babel (Germany) C Porwik	1	3
(Czech Republic) R Bobková (Netherlands) M Koutstaal	6	2	6
14	(Germany) W Probst (Canada) R Simpson	3	6	2
(Canada) M Bernard (Canada) C Delisle	7	7
WC	(France) K Quentrec (France) S Testud	5	6^{3}
(Netherlands) I Driehuis (Australia) L Pleming	4	6	6
WC	(France) A Cocheteux (France) A-G Sidot	6	2	1
2	(United States) G Fernández (Belarus) N Zvereva	4	6	6
(Japan) M Saeki (Japan) Y Yoshida	6	3	2

Second round
8	(Argentina) G Sabatini (Netherlands) B Schultz-McCarthy	7	6
(Russia) E Likhovtseva (Germany) C Singer	6^{1}	2
(Czech Republic) E Melicharová (Czech Republic) H Vildová	2	7	1
9	(France) J Halard-Decugis (France) N Tauziat	6	6^{5}	6
(Czech Republic) R Bobková (Netherlands) M Koutstaal	3	4
(Canada) M Bernard (Canada) C Delisle	6	6
(Netherlands) I Driehuis (Australia) L Pleming	1	0
2	(United States) G Fernández (Belarus) N Zvereva	6	6

Third round
8	(Argentina) G Sabatini (Netherlands) B Schultz-McCarthy	6	2	2
9	(France) J Halard-Decugis (France) N Tauziat	2	6	6
(Canada) M Bernard (Canada) C Delisle	2	3
2	(United States) G Fernández (Belarus) N Zvereva	6	6

Quarterfinals
9	(France) J Halard-Decugis (France) N Tauziat	6^{4}	6^{5}
2	(United States) G Fernández (Belarus) N Zvereva	7	7
