= Hiromi Nagano =

Japanese tennis player (born 1971)

- Full name: Hiromi Nagano
- Country (sports): Japan
- Born: 20 July 1971 (age 53)
- Prize money: $116,294

Singles
- Highest ranking: No. 153 (26 June 1995)

Grand Slam singles results
- Australian Open: 1R (1995)

Doubles
- Highest ranking: No. 90 (11 September 1995)

Grand Slam doubles results
- Australian Open: 1R (1995, 1996)
- French Open: 2R (1995)
- Wimbledon: 1R (1995)
- US Open: 2R (1995)

Hiromi Nagano (born 20 July 1971) is a Japanese former professional tennis player.

Nagano reached a best singles ranking of 153 and appeared in the main draw of the 1995 Australian Open, as a qualifier. In doubles she was ranked as high as 90 in the world and featured in all four grand slam main draws during her career.

== ITF finals ==
$50,000 tournaments
$25,000 tournaments

=== Singles: 4 (1–3) ===
Outcome	No.	Date	Tournament	Surface	Opponent	Score
Runner-up	1.	27 April 1992	Jakarta, Indonesia	Clay	(Austria) Nike Dobrovits	2–6, 4–6
Winner	1.	19 July 1993	St. Simons, United States	Clay	(Japan) Ai Sugiyama	6–1, 6–1
Runner-up	2.	11 July 1994	Evansville, U.S.	Hard	(United States) Jolene Watanabe-Giltz	1–6, 5–7
Runner-up	3.	30 October 1994	Jakarta, Indonesia	Hard	(Bulgaria) Elena Pampoulova	4–6, 1–6

=== Doubles: 3 (1–2) ===
Outcome	No.	Date	Tournament	Surface	Partner	Opponents	Score
Runner-up	1.	16 June 1991	Mantua, Italy	Clay	(Japan) Yone Kamio	(Spain) Virginia Ruano Pascual (Austria) Marion Maruska	6–3, 4–6, 3–6
Winner	1.	12 July 1993	Evansville, United States	Hard	(Netherlands) Carin Bakkum	(South Africa) Mareze Joubert (South Africa) Rene Mentz	6–2, 6–2
Runner-up	2.	2 August 1993	Winnipeg, Canada	Hard	(Slovakia) Janette Husárová	(Canada) Mélanie Bernard (Canada) Caroline Delisle	W/O
