= 1994 US Open – Women's doubles =

Women's doubles
- 1994 US Open

Final
- Champion: (Czech Republic) Jana Novotná (Spain) Arantxa Sánchez Vicario
- Runner-up: (Bulgaria) Katerina Maleeva (United States) Robin White
- Score: 6–3, 6–3

Details
- Draw: 64 (4 WC )
- Seeds: 16

Events
Singles	men	women		boys	girls
Doubles	men	women	mixed	boys	girls
WC Singles	men	women	quad
WC Doubles	men	women	quad
Legends	men	women	mixed
← 1993 ·	US Open	· 1995 →

Defending champion Arantxa Sánchez Vicario and her partner Jana Novotná defeated Robin White and Katerina Maleeva in the final, 6–3, 6–3 to win the women's doubles tennis title at the 1994 US Open.

Sánchez Vicario and Helena Suková were the reigning champions, but Suková did not participate this year.

With their semifinal loss to Maleeva and White, Gigi Fernández and Natasha Zvereva missed out on the Calendar Grand Slam in women's doubles for the second straight year, both in the semifinals of the US Open. It was the third consecutive year that they won 3 of the slams and lost in the semifinals of the last slam, it was the Australian Open in 1992.

== Seeds ==
Champion seeds are indicated in bold text while text in italics indicates the round in which those seeds were eliminated.

1. (United States) Gigi Fernández / (Belarus) Natasha Zvereva (semifinals)
2. (Czech Republic) **Jana Novotná** / (Spain) **Arantxa Sánchez Vicario (champions)**
3. (United States) Patty Fendick / (United States) Meredith McGrath (quarterfinals)
4. (United States) Pam Shriver / (Australia) Liz Smylie (third round)
5. (United States) Lindsay Davenport / (United States) Lisa Raymond (quarterfinals)
6. (United States) Katrina Adams / (Netherlands) Manon Bollegraf (quarterfinals)
7. (South Africa) Amanda Coetzer / (Argentina) Inés Gorrochategui (third round)
8. Unknown (withdrew)
9. (France) Julie Halard / (France) Nathalie Tauziat (first round)
10. (Latvia) Larisa Neiland / (Argentina) Gabriela Sabatini (semifinals)
11. (Indonesia) Yayuk Basuki / (Japan) Nana Miyagi (second round)
12. (Spain) Conchita Martínez / (Ukraine) Natalia Medvedeva (third round)
13. (United States) Nicole Arendt / (Australia) Kristine Kunce (third round)
14. (Canada) Jill Hetherington / (United States) Shaun Stafford (first round)
15. (Italy) Sandra Cecchini / (Argentina) Patricia Tarabini (second round)
16. (Italy) Laura Golarsa / (Netherlands) Caroline Vis (third round)

== Draw ==
=== Key ===
- Q = Qualifier
- WC = Wild card
- LL = Lucky loser
- Alt = Alternate
- ITF = ITF entry
- PR = Protected ranking
- SR = Special ranking
- SE = Special exempt
- JE = Junior exempt
- JR = Junior Accelerator Programme entrant
- CO = College Accelerator Programme entrant
- NG = Next Gen Accelerator Program entrant
- w/o = Walkover
- r = Retired
- d = Defaulted

=== Finals ===
Quarterfinals
1	(United States) Gigi Fernández (Belarus) Natasha Zvereva	6	6
6	(United States) Katrina Adams (Netherlands) Manon Bollegraf	2	2
(Bulgaria) Katerina Maleeva (United States) Robin White	6	6
(Australia) Nicole Bradtke (South Africa) Elna Reinach	3	1
10	(Latvia) Larisa Neiland (Argentina) Gabriela Sabatini	1	7	6
3	(United States) Patty Fendick (United States) Meredith McGrath	6	6	4
5	(United States) Lindsay Davenport (United States) Lisa Raymond	2	4
2	(Czech Republic) Jana Novotná (Spain) Arantxa Sánchez Vicario	6	6

Semifinals
1	(United States) Gigi Fernández (Belarus) Natasha Zvereva	6	6	3
(Bulgaria) Katerina Maleeva (United States) Robin White	7	1	6
10	(Latvia) Larisa Neiland (Argentina) Gabriela Sabatini	6	2
2	(Czech Republic) Jana Novotná (Spain) Arantxa Sánchez Vicario	7	6

Final
(Bulgaria) Katerina Maleeva (United States) Robin White	3	3
2	(Czech Republic) Jana Novotná (Spain) Arantxa Sánchez Vicario	6	6

=== Top half ===
==== Section 1 ====
First round
1	(United States) G Fernández (Belarus) N Zvereva	6	6
(Russia) E Likhovtseva (Russia) E Makarova	3	4
(Australia) J Byrne (New Zealand) J Richardson	7	6
(Netherlands) I Driehuis (Croatia) M Murić	6	4
(Netherlands) K Boogert (Netherlands) N Krijger-Jagerman	6	6
(Romania) I Spîrlea (Hungary) A Temesvári	3	2
(Australia) M Jaggard-Lai (Canada) R Simpson	6	4	6
9	(France) Julie Halard (France) N Tauziat	2	6	0
15	(Italy) S Cecchini (Argentina) P Tarabini	7	6
(Italy) S Attili (Italy) E Savoldi	5	2
WC	(United States) E Hakami (United States) D Scott	6	6
(Czech Republic) R Bobková (Czech Republic) P Langrová	1	2
(Japan) K Nagatsuka (Japan) A Sugiyama	6	6
(China) L Fang (China) L-L Chen	3	3
6	(United States) K Adams (Netherlands) M Bollegraf	6	6
(Canada) P Hy-Boulais (United States) M Werdel-Witmeyer	4	3

Second round
1	(United States) G Fernández (Belarus) N Zvereva	6	6
(Australia) J Byrne (New Zealand) J Richardson	3	4
(Netherlands) K Boogert (Netherlands) N Krijger-Jagerman	6	6
(Australia) M Jaggard-Lai (Canada) R Simpson	3	3
15	(Italy) S Cecchini (Argentina) P Tarabini	6	3	4
WC	(United States) E Hakami (United States) D Scott	4	6	6
(Japan) K Nagatsuka (Japan) A Sugiyama	3	3
6	(United States) K Adams (Netherlands) M Bollegraf	6	6

Third round
1	(United States) G Fernández (Belarus) N Zvereva	6	6
(Netherlands) K Boogert (Netherlands) N Krijger-Jagerman	3	2
WC	(United States) E Hakami (United States) D Scott	5	2
6	(United States) K Adams (Netherlands) M Bollegraf	7	6

Quarterfinals
1	(United States) G Fernández (Belarus) N Zvereva	6	6
6	(United States) K Adams (Netherlands) M Bollegraf	2	2

==== Section 2 ====
First round
4	(United States) P Shriver (Australia) L Smylie	6	6
(Australia) K-A Guse (United States) S McCarthy	3	3
(Belgium) N Feber (France) S Testud	6	7
(Germany) B Rittner (Germany) C Singer	3	6
(Bulgaria) K Maleeva (United States) R White	6	6
(Romania) C Cristea (Japan) R Hiraki	2	0
11	(Indonesia) Y Basuki (Japan) N Miyagi	2	6	6
(Australia) C Barclay (Argentina) M Paz	6	4	3
(Australia) N Bradtke (South Africa) E Reinach	4	6	6
14	(Canada) J Hetherington (United States) S Stafford	6	1	4
(Ukraine) E Brioukhovets (Slovakia) J Husárová	6	6
(Romania) R Dragomir (Spain) J Souto	2	1
(Italy) S Farina (United States) G Helgeson-Nielsen	6	6
(Australia) L Pleming (Slovakia) D Szabová	4	4
(Austria) P Schwarz (France) N van Lottum	6	6
LL	(South Africa) J Kruger (Argentina) B Fulco	1	1

Second round
4	(United States) P Shriver (Australia) L Smylie	6	6
(Belgium) N Feber (France) S Testud	2	2
(Bulgaria) K Maleeva (United States) R White	7	2	6
11	(Indonesia) Y Basuki (Japan) N Miyagi	6	6	4
(Australia) N Bradtke (South Africa) E Reinach	6	6
(Ukraine) E Brioukhovets (Slovakia) J Husárová	1	4
(Italy) S Farina (United States) G Helgeson-Nielsen	6	6
(Austria) P Schwarz (France) N van Lottum	3	1

Third round
4	(United States) P Shriver (Australia) L Smylie	1	4
(Bulgaria) K Maleeva (United States) R White	6	6
(Australia) N Bradtke (South Africa) E Reinach	7	6
(Italy) S Farina (United States) G Helgeson-Nielsen	6	2

Quarterfinals
(Bulgaria) K Maleeva (United States) R White	6	6
(Australia) N Bradtke (South Africa) E Reinach	3	1

=== Bottom half ===
==== Section 3 ====
First round
7	(South Africa) A Coetzer (Argentina) I Gorrochategui	6	6
(Sweden) M Lindström (Sweden) M Strandlund-Tomsvik	2	3
(Russia) E Maniokova (Georgia (country)) L Meskhi	7	6
(France) I Demongeot (Belgium) D Monami	6	2
(United States) S Collins (United States) B Nagelsen	6	5	6
(United Kingdom) V Lake (United Kingdom) C Wood	2	7	1
10	(Latvia) L Neiland (Argentina) G Sabatini	6	6
(France) A Fusai (Australia) T Morton-Rodgers	0	4
16	(Italy) L Golarsa (Netherlands) C Vis	6	4	6
(United States) A Wunderlich (Croatia) I Majoli	2	6	0
(South Africa) M de Swardt (South Africa) T Price	6	3	6
(France) A Dechaume-Balleret (Argentina) F Labat	3	6	4
(Australia) R McQuillan (Netherlands) M Oremans	6	7
(United States) A Frazier (United States) K Po	4	6
3	(United States) P Fendick (United States) M McGrath	6	6
(Japan) Y Kamio (Japan) N Kijimuta	2	0

Second round
7	(South Africa) A Coetzer (Argentina) I Gorrochategui	7	6
(Russia) E Maniokova (Georgia (country)) L Meskhi	6	4
(United States) S Collins (United States) B Nagelsen	4	1
10	(Latvia) L Neiland (Argentina) G Sabatini	6	6
16	(Italy) L Golarsa (Netherlands) C Vis	7	1	6
(South Africa) M de Swardt (South Africa) T Price	6	6	3
(Australia) R McQuillan (Netherlands) M Oremans	0	6	3
3	(United States) P Fendick (United States) M McGrath	6	3	6

Third round
7	(South Africa) A Coetzer (Argentina) I Gorrochategui	2	1
10	(Latvia) L Neiland (Argentina) G Sabatini	6	6
16	(Italy) L Golarsa (Netherlands) C Vis	1	4
3	(United States) P Fendick (United States) M McGrath	6	6

Quarterfinals
10	(Latvia) L Neiland (Argentina) G Sabatini	1	7	6
3	(United States) P Fendick (United States) M McGrath	6	6	4

==== Section 4 ====
First round
5	(United States) L Davenport (United States) L Raymond	6	6
(Sweden) Å Carlsson (United States) M Jackson-Nobrega	1	3
WC	(United States) S Cacic (United States) J Steven	7	2	6
(Germany) S Hack (Germany) V Martinek	5	6	2
(Belgium) S Appelmans (Bulgaria) M Maleeva	6	7
(United States) C MacGregor (United States) V Paynter	2	5
12	(Spain) C Martínez (Ukraine) N Medvedeva	6	7
(Italy) L Garrone (France) K Quentrec	0	5
13	(United States) N Arendt (Australia) K Kunce	4	6	6
(United States) L Wild (United States) C Rubin	6	4	3
WC	(United States) R Jensen (Hungary) N Köves	6	6
(Austria) K Kschwendt (Czech Republic) A Strnadová	4	4
(Slovakia) K Habšudová (Slovakia) R Zrubáková	7	6
(Finland) N Dahlman (Spain) V Ruano Pascual	6	1
2	(Czech Republic) J Novotná (Spain) A Sánchez Vicario	6	6
WC	(United States) C Moros (United States) S Nickitas	3	3

Second round
5	(United States) L Davenport (United States) L Raymond	6	6
WC	(United States) S Cacic (United States) J Steven	2	1
(Belgium) S Appelmans (Bulgaria) M Maleeva	6	3	4
12	(Spain) C Martínez (Ukraine) N Medvedeva	1	6	6
13	(United States) N Arendt (Australia) K Kunce	6	6
WC	(United States) R Jensen (Hungary) N Köves	2	2
(Slovakia) K Habšudová (Slovakia) R Zrubáková	2	0
2	(Czech Republic) J Novotná (Spain) A Sánchez Vicario	6	6

Third round
5	(United States) L Davenport (United States) L Raymond	6	6
12	(Spain) C Martínez (Ukraine) N Medvedeva	4	3
13	(United States) N Arendt (Australia) K Kunce	6	1
2	(Czech Republic) J Novotná (Spain) A Sánchez Vicario	7	6

Quarterfinals
5	(United States) L Davenport (United States) L Raymond	2	4
2	(Czech Republic) J Novotná (Spain) A Sánchez Vicario	6	6
