= Tina Samara =

American tennis player

- Country (sports): Norway; United States
- Born: July 26, 1974 (age 52) Oslo, Norway
- Prize money: $11,944

Singles
- Career titles: 0
- Highest ranking: No. 572 (August 11, 1997)

Grand Slam singles results
- US Open: Q1 (1994, 1995)

Doubles
- Career titles: 1 ITF
- Highest ranking: No. 223 (September 28, 1998)

Tina Samara (born July 26, 1974) is an American former professional tennis player.

== Biography ==
Samara was born in Oslo, to a Norwegian mother and Sri Lankan father, before later settling in Laurel Hollow, New York.

From 1992 to 1996, Samara attended the University of Georgia, where she was a two-time All-American in tennis. She was a member of Georgia's NCAA championship winning team in 1994, partnering with Stacy Sheppard to win the title deciding doubles match. She and Sheppard became college tennis' top ranked doubles pairing in 1995.

Samara represented her birth country Norway in the Fed Cup, appearing in a total of 12 ties between 1996 and 1998. As a professional player she was most successful in doubles, with a best ranking of 223 and one ITF title. She twice featured in the singles qualifying draw for the US Open.

An experienced coach in college tennis, since 2008 she has been a head coach at the University of Louisiana at Lafayette, West Virginia University, University of Wisconsin-Madison and the University of the Pacific.

== ITF finals ==
$25,000 tournaments
$10,000 tournaments

=== Doubles: 7 (1–6) ===
Result	No.	Date	Tournament	Surface	Partner	Opponents	Score
Loss	1.	February 10, 1992	Swindon, Great Britain	Carpet	(United States) Jacqueline Geller	(United Kingdom) Lorna Woodroffe (United Kingdom) Julie Pullin	4–6, 4–6
Loss	2.	June 19, 1995	Peachtree, United States	Hard	(United States) Stacy Sheppard	(Australia) Melissa Beadman (Australia) Nicole Oomens	6–7^{(7–9)}, 1–6
Loss	3.	June 26, 1995	Hilton Head, United States	Hard	(United States) Stacy Sheppard	(United States) Jane Chi (Chinese Taipei) Stephanie Chi	3–6, 6–7^{(5–7)}
Win	1.	April 14, 1997	Elvas, Portugal	Hard	(Canada) Aneta Soukup	(Brazil) Miriam D'Agostini (Spain) Alicia Ortuño	6–4, 7–5
Loss	4.	June 8, 1997	Little Rock, United States	Hard	(United States) Erica Adams	(Australia) Amy Jensen (United States) Samantha Reeves	0–6, 4–6
Loss	5.	June 16, 1997	Mount Pleasant, United States	Hard	(United States) Amanda Augustus	(United States) Keirsten Alley (Indonesia) Liza Andriyani	6–2, 3–6, 4–6
Loss	6.	June 23, 1997	Greenwood, United States	Hard	(United States) Keirsten Alley	(Australia) Melissa Beadman (Australia) Amy Jensen	6–4, 2–6, 4–6
