= Janette Husárová =

Slovak tennis player (born 1974)

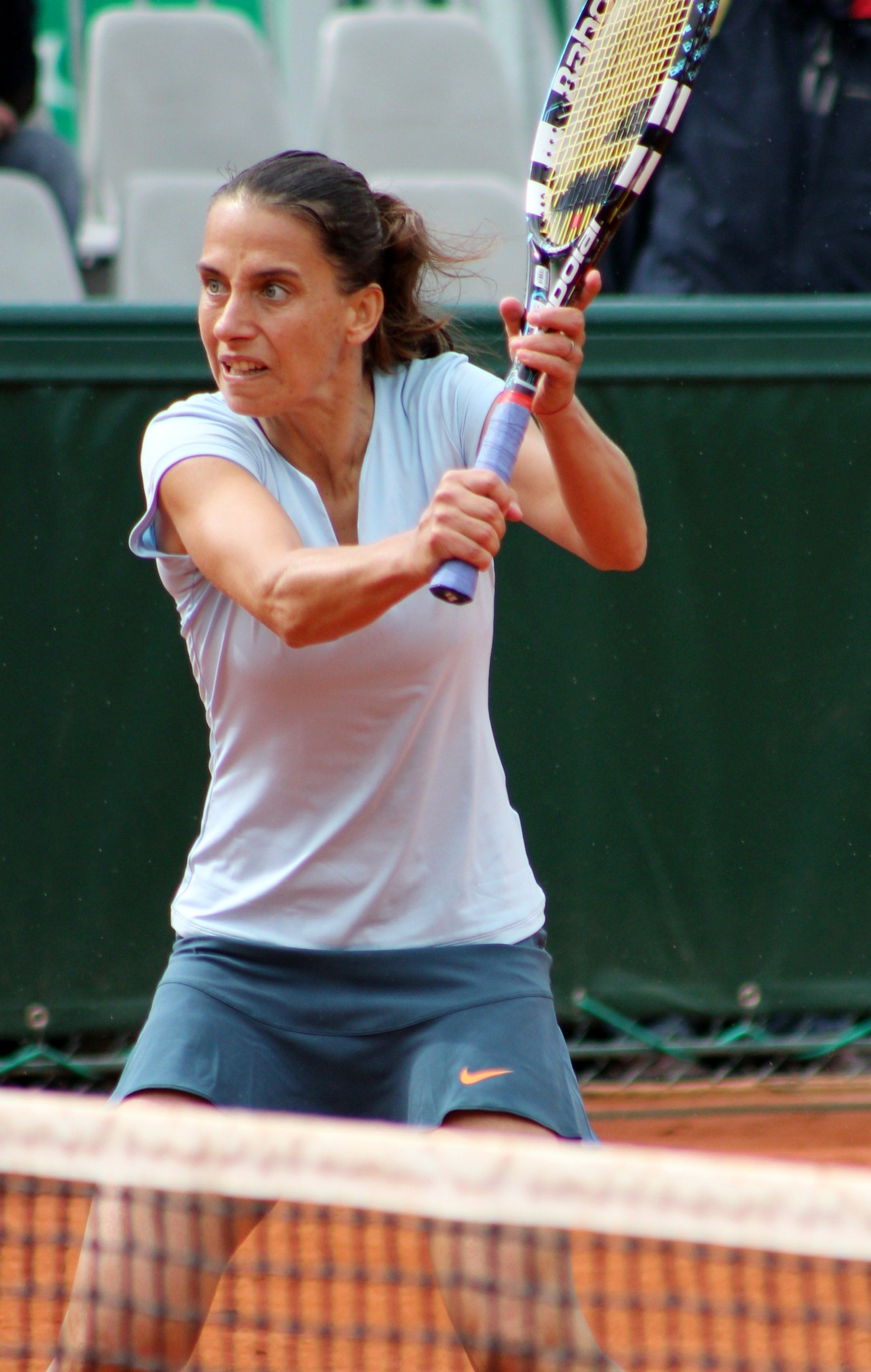
- Husárová at the 2013 French Open
- Country (sports): Slovakia
- Residence: Bratislava, Slovakia
- Born: 4 June 1974 (age 52) Bratislava, Czechoslovakia
- Height: 1.69 m (5 ft 7 in)
- Turned pro: 1991
- Retired: 2016
- Plays: Right-handed (two-handed backhand)
- Prize money: $2,402,865

Singles
- Career record: 291–246
- Career titles: 0 WTA, 4 ITF
- Highest ranking: No. 31 (13 January 2003)

Grand Slam singles results
- Australian Open: 4R (2002)
- French Open: 3R (2001, 2002)
- Wimbledon: 1R (1994, 1996, 2001, 2002, 2003)
- US Open: 2R (2001, 2002)

Doubles
- Career record: 502–324
- Career titles: 25 WTA, 16 ITF
- Highest ranking: No. 3 (21 April 2003)

Grand Slam doubles results
- Australian Open: QF (2004, 2008)
- French Open: QF (2003, 2004, 2007)
- Wimbledon: QF (2003)
- US Open: F (2002)

Other doubles tournaments
- Tour Finals: W (2002)

Grand Slam mixed doubles results
- French Open: 1R (2014)
- Wimbledon: 2R (2013)

Team competitions
- Fed Cup: 17–12

Janette Husárová (Slovak pronunciation: [ˈɦusaːrɔʋaː]; born 4 June 1974) is a Slovak former tennis player.

On 13 January 2003, she reached her best singles ranking of world No. 31. On 21 April 2003, she peaked at No. 3 in the doubles rankings.

She won the WTA Tour Championships women's doubles title in 2002, partnering with Elena Dementieva. With Dementieva, she reached the final of US Open doubles competition in the same year, losing to Virginia Ruano Pascual and Paola Suárez.

Playing for Slovakia Fed Cup team, Husárová has a win–loss record of 17–12. Together with Daniela Hantuchová, she was a member of the Slovak team winning the Fed Cup in 2002.

In her career, Husárová won 25 doubles titles on the WTA Tour, including the season-ending WTA Championships and three Tier I tournaments (Berlin, Moscow (2002) and Tokyo (2005)), as well as four singles and 16 doubles titles on the ITF Circuit.

In February 2016, Husárová announced her retirement from professional tennis.

== Significant finals ==
=== Grand Slam tournaments ===
==== Doubles: 1 (runner-up) ====
Result	Year	Championship	Surface	Partner	Opponents	Score
Loss	2002	US Open	Hard	(Russia) Elena Dementieva	(Spain) Virginia Ruano Pascual (Argentina) Paola Suárez	6–2, 6–1

=== WTA Championships ===
==== Doubles: 1 (title) ====
Result	Year	Location	Surface	Partner	Opponents	Score
Win	2002	Los Angeles	Carpet (i)	(Russia) Elena Dementieva	(Zimbabwe) Cara Black (Russia) Elena Likhovtseva	4–6, 6–4, 6–3

== WTA Tour career finals ==
=== Doubles: 43 (25 titles, 18 runner-ups) ===
Before 2009	Starting in 2009
Grand Slam tournaments (0–1)
WTA Championships (1–0)
Tier I (3–4)	Premier M (0–0)
Tier II (4–5)	Premier 5 (0–0)
Tier III (5–0)	Premier (0–1)
Tier IV & V (11–6)	International (1–1)

Result	No.	Date	Tournament	Surface	Partner	Opponents	Score
Loss	1.	Oct 1993	Montpellier Open, France	Carpet (i)	(Belgium) Dominique Monami	(United States) Meredith McGrath (Germany) Claudia Porwik	3–6, 6–2, 7–6^{(7–3)}
Win	1.	Jul 1996	Palermo Ladies Open, Italy	Clay	(Austria) Barbara Schett	(Argentina) Florencia Labat (Germany) Barbara Rittner	6–1, 6–2
Win	2.	Aug 1996	Austrian Open, Linz	Clay	(Ukraine) Natalia Medvedeva	(Czech Republic) Lenka Cenková (Czech Republic) Kateřina Šišková	6–4, 7–5
Win	3.	Jan 1997	Auckland Open, New Zealand	Hard	(Belgium) Dominique Monami	(Poland) Aleksandra Olsza (Germany) Elena Wagner	6–2, 6–7^{(5–7)}, 6–3
Loss	2.	Jan 1998	Auckland Open, New Zealand	Hard	(France) Julie Halard-Decugis	(Japan) Nana Miyagi (Thailand) Tamarine Tanasugarn	7–6^{(7–1)}, 6–4
Loss	3.	Jan 1998	Hobart International, Australia	Hard	(France) Julie Halard-Decugis	(Spain) Virginia Ruano Pascual (Argentina) Paola Suárez	7–6^{(8–6)}, 6–3
Win	4.	Feb 1998	Copa Colsanitas, Colombia	Clay	(Argentina) Paola Suárez	(Venezuela) Melissa Mazzotta (Russia) Ekaterina Sysoeva	3–6, 6–2, 6–3
Loss	4.	May 1999	Warsaw Open, Poland	Clay	(France) Amélie Cocheteux	(Romania) Cătălina Cristea (Kazakhstan) Irina Selyutina	6–1, 6–2
Loss	5.	Oct 1999	Brasil Open	Clay	(Argentina) Florencia Labat	(Argentina) Laura Montalvo (Argentina) Paola Suárez	6–7^{(1–7)}, 7–5, 7–5
Loss	6.	Feb 2000	Brasil Open	Clay	(Argentina) Florencia Labat	(Argentina) Laura Montalvo (Argentina) Paola Suárez	5–7, 6–4, 6–3
Win	5.	May 2000	Warsaw Open, Poland	Clay	(Italy) Tathiana Garbin	(Uzbekistan) Iroda Tulyaganova (Ukraine) Anna Zaporozhanova	6–3, 6–1
Win	6.	Jan 2001	Brisbane International, Australia	Hard	(Italy) Giulia Casoni	(United States) Katie Schlukebir (United States) Meghann Shaughnessy	7–6^{(11–9)}, 7–5
Win	7.	Feb 2001	Copa Colsanitas, Colombia	Clay	(Italy) Tathiana Garbin	(Argentina) Laura Montalvo (Argentina) Paola Suárez	6–4, 2–6, 6–4
Win	8.	Apr 2001	Budapest Grand Prix, Hungary	Clay	(Italy) Tathiana Garbin	(Hungary) Zsófia Gubacsi (Serbia and Montenegro) Dragana Zarić	6–1, 6–3
Win	9.	Jul 2001	Palermo Ladies Open, Italy	Clay	(Italy) Tathiana Garbin	(Spain) María José Martínez Sánchez (Spain) Anabel Medina Garrigues	4–6, 6–2, 6–4
Loss	7.	Feb 2002	Paris Indoors, France	Carpet (i)	(Russia) Elena Dementieva	(France) Nathalie Dechy (United States) Meilen Tu	w/o
Win	10.	Feb 2002	Qatar Ladies Open	Hard	(Spain) Arantxa Sánchez Vicario	(France) Alexandra Fusai (Netherlands) Caroline Vis	6–3, 6–3
Loss	8.	Mar 2002	Indian Wells Open, United States	Hard	(Russia) Elena Dementieva	(United States) Lisa Raymond (Australia) Rennae Stubbs	7–5, 6–0
Win	11.	May 2002	German Open	Clay	(Russia) Elena Dementieva	(Slovakia) Daniela Hantuchová (Spain) Arantxa Sánchez Vicario	0–6, 7–6^{(7–3)}, 6–2
Loss	9.	Jul 2002	Silicon Valley Classic, United States	Hard	(Spain) Conchita Martínez	(United States) Lisa Raymond (Australia) Rennae Stubbs	6–1, 6–1
Win	12.	Aug 2002	Carlsbad Open, United States	Hard	(Russia) Elena Dementieva	(Slovakia) Daniela Hantuchová (Japan) Ai Sugiyama	6–2, 6–4
Loss	10.	Aug 2002	New Haven Open, United States	Hard	(Italy) Tathiana Garbin	(Slovakia) Daniela Hantuchová (Spain) Arantxa Sánchez Vicario	6–3, 1–6, 7–5
Loss	11.	Aug 2002	US Open	Hard	(Russia) Elena Dementieva	(Spain) Virginia Ruano Pascual (Argentina) Paola Suárez	6–2, 6–1
Loss	12.	Sep 2002	Leipzig Cup, Germany	Carpet (i)	(Argentina) Paola Suárez	(United States) Alexandra Stevenson (United States) Serena Williams	6–3, 7–5
Win	13.	Oct 2002	Kremlin Cup, Russia	Carpet (i)	(Russia) Elena Dementieva	(Serbia and Montenegro) Jelena Dokić (Russia) Nadia Petrova	2–6, 6–3, 7–6^{(9–7)}
Win	14.	Oct 2002	Luxembourg Open	Hard (i)	(Belgium) Kim Clijsters	(Czech Republic) Květa Hrdličková (Germany) Barbara Rittner	4–6, 6–3, 7–5
Win	15.	Nov 2002	WTA Tour Championships, Los Angeles	Hard (i)	(Russia) Elena Dementieva	(Zimbabwe) Cara Black (Russia) Elena Likhovtseva	4–6, 6–4, 6–3
Loss	13.	Apr 2003	Charleston Open, United States	Clay	(Spain) Conchita Martínez	(Spain) Virginia Ruano Pascual (Argentina) Paola Suárez	6–0, 6–3
Win	16.	Feb 2004	Dubai Championships, United Arab Emirates	Hard	(Spain) Conchita Martínez	(Russia) Svetlana Kuznetsova (Russia) Elena Likhovtseva	6–0, 1–6, 6–3
Loss	14.	Mar 2004	Qatar Ladies Open	Hard	(Spain) Conchita Martínez	(Russia) Svetlana Kuznetsova (Russia) Elena Likhovtseva	7–6^{(7–4)}, 6–2
Win	17.	Apr 2004	Estoril Open, Portugal	Clay	(Switzerland) Emmanuelle Gagliardi	(Czech Republic) Olga Blahotová (Czech Republic) Gabriela Navrátilová	6–3, 6–2
Loss	15.	May 2004	German Open	Clay	(Spain) Conchita Martínez	(Russia) Nadia Petrova (United States) Meghann Shaughnessy	6–2, 2–6, 6–1
Win	18.	Oct 2004	Linz Open, Austria	Hard (i)	(Russia) Elena Likhovtseva	(France) Nathalie Dechy (Switzerland) Patty Schnyder	6–2, 7–5
Win	19.	Feb 2005	Pan Pacific Open, Japan	Carpet	(Russia) Elena Likhovtseva	(United States) Lindsay Davenport (United States) Corina Morariu	6–4, 6–3
Win	20.	Jul 2006	Palermo Ladies Open, Italy	Clay	(Netherlands) Michaëlla Krajicek	(Italy) Alice Canepa (Italy) Giulia Gabba	6–0, 6–0
Win	21.	Jul 2006	Budapest Grand Prix, Hungary	Clay	(Netherlands) Michaëlla Krajicek	(Czech Republic) Lucie Hradecká (Czech Republic) Renata Voráčová	4–6, 6–4, 6–4
Win	22.	Jan 2007	Auckland Open, New Zealand	Hard	(Argentina) Paola Suárez	(Chinese Taipei) Hsieh Su-wei (India) Shikha Uberoi	6–0, 6–2
Win	23.	Sep 2007	Luxembourg Open	Hard (i)	(Czech Republic) Iveta Benešová	(Belarus) Victoria Azarenka (Israel) Shahar Pe'er	6–4, 6–2
Loss	16.	May 2008	Italian Open	Clay	(Czech Republic) Iveta Benešová	(Chinese Taipei) Chuang Chia-jung (Chinese Taipei) Chan Yung-jan	7–6^{(7–5)}, 6–3
Win	24.	Jul 2008	Budapest Grand Prix, Hungary	Clay	(France) Alizé Cornet	(Germany) Vanessa Henke (Romania) Raluca Olaru	6–7^{(5–7)}, 6–1, [10–6]
Win	25.	May 2012	Budapest Grand Prix, Hungary	Clay	(Slovakia) Magdaléna Rybáriková	(Czech Republic) Eva Birnerová (Netherlands) Michaëlla Krajicek	6–4, 6–2
Loss	17.	Mar 2013	Malaysian Open	Hard	(China) Zhang Shuai	(Japan) Shuko Aoyama (Chinese Taipei) Chang Kai-chen	7–6^{(7–4)}, 6–7^{(4–7)}, [12–14]
Loss	18.	Aug 2013	Carlsbad Open, United States	Hard	(Chinese Taipei) Chan Hao-ching	(United States) Raquel Kops-Jones (United States) Abigail Spears	4–6, 1–6

== ITF Circuit finals ==
$100,000 tournaments
$75,000 tournaments
$50,000 tournaments
$25,000 tournaments
$10,000 tournaments

=== Singles: 11 (4–7) ===
Result	No.	Date	Tournament	Surface	Opponent	Score
Loss	1.	10 June 1991	ITF Rome, Italy	Clay	(Italy) Barbara Romanò	5–7, 6–2, 3–6
Loss	2.	20 April 1992	ITF Aveiro, Portugal	Hard	(Japan) Hiroko Hara	6–2, 3–6, 1–6
Win	3.	27 April 1992	ITF Leiria, Portugal	Hard	(France) Cécile Dorey	6–1, 4–6, 7–5
Loss	4.	8 June 1992	ITF Nicolosi, Italy	Clay	(Italy) Laura Lapi	0–6, 3–6
Loss	5.	17 May 1993	ITF Karlovy Vary, Czech Republic	Clay	(Austria) Judith Wiesner	3–6, 5–7
Win	6.	14 August 1995	ITF Maribor, Slovenia	Clay	(Austria) Sandra Dopfer	7–6^{(5)}, 3–6, 6–4
Loss	7.	21 August 1995	ITF Sopot, Poland	Clay	(Slovakia) Katarína Studeníková	6–4, 3–6, 3–6
Loss	8.	25 September 1995	ITF Bratislava, Slovakia	Clay	(Poland) Magdalena Grzybowska	6–2, 4–6, 1–6
Win	9.	8 November 1998	ITF Mogi das Cruzes, Brazil	Clay	(Argentina) Paola Suárez	6–2, 2–6, 6–1
Loss	10.	23 November 1998	ITF Lima, Peru	Clay	(Spain) Mariam Ramón Climent	1–6, 1–4 ret.
Win	11.	6 June 1999	ITF Budapest, Hungary	Clay	(Hungary) Petra Mandula	6–4, 6–2

=== Doubles: 27 (16–11) ===
Result	No.	Date	Tournament	Surface	Partner	Opponents	Score
Loss	1.	25 February 1991	ITF Valencia, Spain	Clay	(Czechoslovakia) Zdeňka Málková	(Spain) Rosa Bielsa (Spain) Janet Souto	2–6, 3–6
Win	2.	1 April 1991	ITF Šibenik, Yugoslavia	Clay	(Czechoslovakia) Zdeňka Málková	(Soviet Union) Elena Makarova (Soviet Union) Irina Sukhova	6–1, 7–5
Win	3.	8 April 1991	ITF Belgrade, Yugoslavia	Clay	(Czechoslovakia) Zdeňka Málková	(Socialist Federal Republic of Yugoslavia) Ivona Horvat (Czechoslovakia) Eva Martincová	6–0, 7–6^{(11)}
Win	4.	13 May 1991	ITF Munich, Germany	Clay	(Soviet Union) Irina Zvereva	(Czechoslovakia) Ivana Havrlíková (Czechoslovakia) Pavlína Rajzlová	7–5, 6–2
Win	5.	13 May 1991	ITF Capua, Italy	Clay	(Czechoslovakia) Monika Kratochvílová	(Spain) María Carmen García (Spain) Eva Jiménez	6–1, 6–1
Win	6.	10 June 1991	ITF Rome, Italy	Clay	(Czechoslovakia) Monika Kratochvílová	(Italy) Gabriella Boschiero (Italy) Federica Riccadonna	6–4, 6–2
Loss	7.	24 February 1992	ITF Castellón, Spain	Clay	(Socialist Federal Republic of Yugoslavia) Ivona Horvat	(Czechoslovakia) Eva Martincová (Czechoslovakia) Pavlína Rajzlová	5–7, 6–2, 1–6
Loss	8.	16 November 1992	ITF Mount Gambier, Australia	Clay	(Czechoslovakia) Eva Martincová	(Australia) Catherine Barclay (Australia) Louise Stacey	6–7^{(7)}, 7–6^{(4)}, 6–7^{(3)}
Win	9.	15 March 1993	ITF San Luis Potosí, Mexico	Hard	(United States) Sandra Cacic	(Canada) Mélanie Bernard (Canada) Caroline Delisle	6–3, 3–6, 6–3
Loss	10.	22 March 1993	ITF St. Simons, United States	Clay	(Australia) Justine Hodder	(Canada) Mélanie Bernard (Canada) Caroline Delisle	5–7, 6–3, 4–6
Loss	11.	5 July 1993	ITF Erlangen, Germany	Clay	(Australia) Danielle Thomas	(Russia) Elena Makarova (Russia) Eugenia Maniokova	1–6, 4–6
Loss	12.	12 July 1993	ITF Winnipeg, Canada	Hard	(Japan) Hiromi Nagano	(Canada) Mélanie Bernard (Canada) Caroline Delisle	w/o
Win	13.	13 June 1994	ITF Sopot, Poland	Clay	(Slovakia) Radka Zrubáková	(Slovakia) Patrícia Marková (Slovakia) Katarína Studeníková	6–2, 7–5
Win	14.	27 June 1994	ITF Plovdiv, Bulgaria	Clay	(Finland) Nanne Dahlman	(Czech Republic) Kateřina Kroupová-Šišková (Czech Republic) Lenka Němečková	6–4, 6–4
Loss	15.	10 July 1994	ITF Erlangen, Germany	Clay	(Slovenia) Tina Križan	(Sweden) Maria Lindström (Sweden) Maria Strandlund	2–6, 2–6
Win	16.	28 September 1997	ITF Bucharest, Romania	Clay	(Hungary) Virág Csurgó	(Belarus) Olga Glouschenko (Belarus) Tatiana Poutchek	6–0, 6–0
Loss	17.	7 June 1998	ITF Bytom, Poland	Clay	(Slovakia) Ľudmila Cervanová	(Spain) Rosa María Andrés Rodríguez (Spain) Mariam Ramón Climent	3–6, 3–6
Runner-up	18.	4 October 1998	ITF Caracas, Venezuela	Hard	(South Africa) Nannie de Villiers	(Argentina) María Fernanda Landa (Netherlands) Seda Noorlander	4–6, 7–5, 6–7
Win	19.	15 March 1999	ITF Reims, France	Clay (i)	(Hungary) Rita Kuti-Kis	(Spain) Gisela Riera (Italy) Antonella Serra Zanetti	6–2, 6–3
Win	20.	15 March 1999	ITF Dinan, France	Clay (i)	(Hungary) Rita Kuti-Kis	(Spain) Mariam Ramón Climent (Spain) Rosa María Andrés Rodríguez	6–4, 6–2
Win	21.	1 August 2011	Empire Slovak Open	Hard	(Czech Republic) Renata Voráčová	(Slovakia) Jana Čepelová (Slovakia) Lenka Wienerová	7–6^{(2)}, 6–1
Runner-up	22.	10 September 2011	ITF Biella, Italy	Clay	(Czech Republic) Renata Voráčová	(Spain) Lara Arruabarrena (Russia) Ekaterina Lopes	3–6, 6–0, [3–10]
Win	23.	23 September 2011	ITF Foggia, Italy	Clay	(Czech Republic) Renata Voráčová	(Spain) Leticia Costas (Spain) Inés Ferrer Suárez	6–1, 6–2
Win	24.	21 November 2011	ITF Helsinki, Finland	Hard (i)	(Finland) Emma Laine	(Hungary) Tímea Babos (Ukraine) Irina Buryachok	5–7, 7–5, [11–9]
Loss	25.	19 December 2011	Ankara Cup, Turkey	Hard (i)	(Hungary) Katalin Marosi	(Russia) Nina Bratchikova (Croatia) Darija Jurak	4–6, 2–6
Win	26.	5 March 2012	ITF Irapuato, Mexico	Hard	(Hungary) Katalin Marosi	(Italy) Maria Elena Camerin (Ukraine) Mariya Koryttseva	6–2, 6–7^{(9)}, [10–7]
Winner	27.	12 March 2012	The Bahamas Open	Hard	(Hungary) Katalin Marosi	(Czech Republic) Eva Birnerová (United Kingdom) Anne Keothavong	6–1, 3–6, [10–6]

== Grand Slam performance timelines ==
Key
W	F	SF	QF	#R	RR	Q#	DNQ	A	NH

(W) winner; (F) finalist; (SF) semifinalist; (QF) quarterfinalist; (#R) rounds 4, 3, 2, 1; (RR) round-robin stage; (Q#) qualification round; (DNQ) did not qualify; (A) absent; (NH) not held; (SR) strike rate (events won / competed); (W–L) win–loss record.

=== Singles ===
Tournament	1993	1994	1995	1996	1997	1998	1999	2000	2001	2002	2003	2004	2005	Career W–L
Australian Open	A	1R	A	1R	1R	2R	A	Q3	2R	4R	2R	Q2	Q1	6–7
French Open	A	A	Q1	1R	A	1R	Q1	Q3	3R	3R	1R	Q1	A	4–5
Wimbledon	A	1R	A	1R	A	A	A	Q1	1R	1R	1R	A	A	0–5
US Open	Q3	1R	A	1R	A	Q1	A	Q2	2R	2R	1R	Q1	A	2–5
Win–loss	0–0	0–3	0–0	0–4	0–1	1–2	0–0	0–0	4–4	6–4	1–4	0–0	0–0	12–22

=== Doubles ===
Tournament	1993	1994	1995	1996	1997	1998	1999	2000	2001	2002	2003	2004	2005	2006	2007	2008	2009	2010	2011	2012	2013	2014	2015	2016	Career W-L
Australian Open	A	1R	A	A	A	1R	A	1R	2R	1R	2R	QF	2R	A	1R	QF	A	A	A	A	1R	1R	A	1R	9–13
French Open	A	A	2R	A	A	1R	2R	2R	1R	2R	QF	QF	3R	3R	QF	1R	1R	A	A	2R	3R	2R	3R	A	23–17
Wimbledon	A	A	A	A	A	1R	1R	1R	3R	1R	QF	3R	3R	2R	3R	2R	1R	A	A	1R	1R	1R	1R	A	13–16
US Open	1R	2R	A	1R	A	1R	A	3R	2R	F	QF	QF	1R	3R	2R	3R	1R	A	A	2R	1R	2R	1R	A	22–18
Win–loss	0–1	1–2	1–1	0–1	0–0	0–4	1–2	3–4	4–4	6–4	10–4	11–4	5–4	5–3	6–4	6–4	0–3	0–0	0–0	2–3	2–4	2–4	2–3	0–1	67–64
