= Sandra Cacic =

American tennis player

- Country (sports): United States
- Residence: Bradenton, Florida, US
- Born: September 10, 1974 (age 51); Joliet, Illinois, US
- Turned pro: 1990
- Retired: 2006
- Plays: Right-handed
- Prize money: $707,596

Singles
- Career record: 281–219
- Career titles: 1 WTA, 8 ITF
- Highest ranking: No. 39 (May 9, 1994)

Grand Slam singles results
- Australian Open: 3R (1996)
- French Open: 2R (1994)
- Wimbledon: 2R (1994,1995, 2001)
- US Open: 2R (1993, 1994)

Doubles
- Career record: 85–75
- Career titles: 1 WTA, 4 ITF
- Highest ranking: No. 87 (February 8, 1999)

Grand Slam doubles results
- Australian Open: 1R (1996, 1999)
- French Open: 1R (1998)
- Wimbledon: 1R (1998)
- US Open: 2R (1994)

Sandra Cacic (born September 10, 1974) is a retired American tennis player. She is of Croatian American descent and her Croatian surname is Čačić.

Her highest WTA singles ranking is 39th, which she achieved on May 9, 1994. Her career-high in doubles was world No. 87, reached in February 1999. In April 1998, she won the Amelia Island doubles tournament, partnering Mary Pierce. In singles, she won the Auckland Open in January 1996.

While playing, Cacic kept a residence in Bradenton, Florida.

== WTA career finals ==
Legend
Grand Slam tournaments
Tier I
Tier II
Tier III
Tier IV & V

=== Singles: 1 (1 title) ===
| Result | Date | Tournament | Tier | Surface | Opponent | Score |
|---|---|---|---|---|---|---|
| Win | Jan 1996 | Auckland Open, New Zealand | Tier IV | Hard | (Austria) Barbara Paulus | 6–3, 1–6, 6–4 |

=== Doubles: 1 (1 title) ===
| Result | Date | Tournament | Tier | Surface | Partner | Opponents | Score |
|---|---|---|---|---|---|---|---|
| Win | Apr 1998 | Amelia Island, United States | Tier II | Clay | (France) Mary Pierce | (Austria) Barbara Schett (Switzerland) Patty Schnyder | 7–6^{(7–5)}, 4–6, 7–6^{(7–5)} |

== ITF Circuit finals ==
$100,000 tournaments
$75,000 tournaments
$50,000 tournaments
$25,000 tournaments
$10,000 tournaments

=== Singles: 12 (8–4) ===
| Result | No. | Date | Tournament | Surface | Opponent | Score |
|---|---|---|---|---|---|---|
| Loss | 1. | 26 October 1992 | ITF Mount Gambier, Australia | Hard | (France) Alexandra Fusai | 4–6, 2–6 |
| Loss | 2. | 10 May 1993 | ITF San Luis Potosí, Mexico | Clay | (Brazil) Luciana Tella | 4–6, 3–6 |
| Win | 3. | 16 May 1993 | ITF León, Mexico | Clay | (Brazil) Luciana Tella | 6–4, 5–7, 6–1 |
| Win | 4. | 23 October 1995 | ITF Lakeland, United States | Hard | (Ukraine) Olga Lugina | 7–5, 6–3 |
| Loss | 5. | 20 April 1997 | ITF Wichita, United States | Hard | (China) Li Fang | 2–6, 2–6 |
| Win | 6. | 27 April 1997 | ITF Monterrey, Mexico | Clay | (Mexico) Angélica Gavaldón | 6–3, 6–2 |
| Win | 7. | 28 September 1997 | ITF Newport Beach, United States | Hard | (United States) Samantha Reeves | 6–4, 4–6, 6–4 |
| Loss | 8. | 23 January 2000 | ITF Boca Raton, United States | Hard | (China) Li Na | 4–6, 3–6 |
| Win | 9. | 18 June 2000 | ITF Mount Pleasant, United States | Hard | (United States) Jolene Watanabe | 6–2, 6–2 |
| Win | 10. | 16 July 2000 | ITF Peachtree City, United States | Hard | (Russia) Alina Jidkova | 6–0, 4–2 ret. |
| Win | 11. | 23 July 2000 | ITF Mahwah, United States | Hard | (United States) Tracy Almeda-Singian | 6–2, 6–7^{(6)}, 7–5 |
| Win | 12. | 6 November 2000 | ITF Pittsburgh, United States | Hard | (Paraguay) Rossana de los Ríos | 7–5, 1–6, 6–2 |

=== Doubles: 12 (4–8) ===
| Result | No | Date | Tournament | Surface | Partner | Opponents | Score |
|---|---|---|---|---|---|---|---|
| Loss | 1. | 25 May 1992 | ITF Orlando, United States | Clay | (Venezuela) María Vento-Kabchi | (United States) Trisha Laux (United States) Michelle Jackson-Nobrega | 3–6, 6–2, 4–6 |
| Loss | 2. | 15 June 1992 | ITF St. Simons, United States | Clay | (United States) Michelle Jackson-Nobrega | (United States) Alysia May (United States) Stephanie Reece | 3–6, 6–7^{(2)} |
| Win | 3. | 15 March 1993 | ITF San Luis Potosí, Mexico | Hard | (Slovakia) Janette Husárová | (Canada) Mélanie Bernard (Canada) Caroline Delisle | 6–3, 3–6, 6–3 |
| Loss | 4. | 29 October 1995 | ITF Lakeland, United States | Hard | (Australia) Tracey Morton-Rodgers | (Czech Republic) Eva Martincová (Bulgaria) Elena Pampoulova | 6–1, 2–6, 1–6 |
| Loss | 5. | 18 July 1999 | ITF Mahwah, United States | Hard | (United States) Karin Miller | (United States) Dawn Buth (Canada) Vanessa Webb | 4–6, 3–6 |
| Win | 6. | 17 January 2000 | ITF Boca Raton, United States | Hard | (United States) Lindsay Lee-Waters | (China) Li Ting (China) Li Na | 6–4, 7–5 |
| Loss | 7. | 31 January 2000 | ITF Clearwater, United States | Hard | (United States) Lindsay Lee-Waters | (South Korea) Cho Yoon-jeong (China) Yi Jing-Qian | 4–6, 6–7^{(7)} |
| Win | 8. | 30 April 2000 | ITF Sarasota, United States | Hard | (United States) Meghann Shaughnessy | (Australia) Evie Dominikovic (Australia) Amanda Grahame | 6–4, 6–2 |
| Loss | 9. | 9 July 2000 | ITF Los Gatos, United States | Hard | (Canada) Renata Kolbovic | (Chinese Taipei) Janet Lee (Canada) Vanessa Webb | 4–6, 1–6 |
| Loss | 10. | 6 August 2000 | ITF Lexington, United States | Hard | (Canada) Renata Kolbovic | (Chinese Taipei) Janet Lee (Indonesia) Wynne Prakusya | 2–6, 6–3, 2–6 |
| Loss | 11. | 22 October 2000 | ITF Largo, United States | Hard | (United States) Dawn Buth | (United States) Brie Rippner (Ukraine) Elena Tatarkova | 2–6, 4–6 |
| Win | 12. | 14 January 2003 | ITF Boca Raton, United States | Hard | (Canada) Sonya Jeyaseelan | (United States) Shenay Perry (Russia) Lioudmila Skavronskaia | 7–5, 6–2 |
