= Vickie Paynter =

American tennis player

- Full name: Vickie Paynter–Finney
- Country (sports): United States
- Born: August 27, 1971 (age 53)
- Prize money: $41,268

Singles
- Highest ranking: No. 304 (November 21, 1994)

Doubles
- Highest ranking: No. 112 (January 30, 1995)

Grand Slam doubles results
- French Open: 1R (1994, 1995)
- US Open: 1R (1994, 1995)

Vickie Paynter–Finney (born August 27, 1971) is a former professional tennis player from the United States.

== Biography ==
=== College tennis ===
Paynter grew up in Denville Township, New Jersey and graduated from Morris Knolls High School in 1989. She played collegiate tennis for the Texas Longhorns of the University of Texas, Austin, from 1990 to 1993 on a full athletic scholarship. She was a member of the Texas team that won the NCAA Women's Tennis Championship in 1993, beating Florida 5–2 in Gainesville. With partner Susan Gilchrist she formed the nation's top ranked doubles combination in college tennis, with their win over Laxmi Poruri and Heather Willens securing the title.

=== Professional tour ===
As a professional player, Paynter had a best doubles ranking of 112 in the world and won nine doubles titles on the ITF circuit. Her best WTA Tour performances came in 1995 when she reached the doubles semi-finals of tournaments in Hobart and Houston. She twice featured in the main draw of the women's doubles at both the French Open and US Open, before retiring in 1996.

=== Personal life ===
Settling in Texas, she is the co-founder of Austin-based web design company Dot Command Center, which she runs with husband Rich Finney.
