= Alix Creek =

American tennis player

- Full name: Alixandra Creek Chesno
- Country (sports): United States
- Born: October 22, 1972 (age 52)
- Prize money: $43,244

Singles
- Career titles: 2 ITF
- Highest ranking: No. 205 (Aug 29, 1994)

Grand Slam singles results
- Australian Open: Q1 (1995)
- US Open: Q1 (1993, 1994)

Doubles
- Career record: 1 ITF
- Highest ranking: No. 284 (May 1, 1995)

Grand Slam doubles results
- US Open: 1R (1993)

Alixandra Creek Chesno (born October 22, 1972) is an American former professional tennis player.

Raised in Rochester, New York, Creek trained at Florida's Nick Bollettieri Tennis Academy and played collegiate tennis for the University of Arizona in the early 1990s. She won two Pac-10 singles championships and was the NCAA Division I doubles champion in 1993, partnering Michelle Oldham.

Creek reached a best singles ranking of 205 on the professional tour and won two titles on the ITF Women's Circuit. She featured in the women's doubles main draw of the 1993 US Open as a wildcard pairing with collegiate partner Michelle Oldham. Her best doubles ranking was 284 in the world.

== ITF finals ==
=== Singles: 3 (2–1) ===
| Result | No. | Date | Tournament | Surface | Opponent | Score |
|---|---|---|---|---|---|---|
| Win | 1. | Oct 1988 | ITF Montevideo, Uruguay | Clay | (Argentina) Federica Haumüller | 6–3, 3–6, 6–3 |
| Loss | 2. | Jun 1992 | ITF Key Biscayne, United States | Hard | (Sri Lanka) Lihini Weerasuriya | 0–6, 2–6 |
| Win | 3. | Apr 1995 | ITF Caracas, Venezuela | Hard | (Venezuela) Ninfa Marra | 6–4, 5–7, 6–0 |

=== Doubles: 2 (1–1) ===
| Result | No. | Date | Tournament | Surface | Partner | Opponents | Score |
|---|---|---|---|---|---|---|---|
| Loss | 1. | Oct 1988 | ITF Montevideo, Uruguay | Clay | (United States) Erika deLone | (Netherlands) Marielle Rooimans (Netherlands) Nicolette Rooimans | 2–6, 2–6 |
| Win | 2. | Apr 1995 | ITF Caracas, Venezuela | Hard | (United States) Kristine Kurth | (Venezuela) María Virginia Francesa (Venezuela) Ninfa Marra | 6–2, 2–6, 6–0 |
