= Katerina Maleeva =

Bulgarian tennis player (born 1969)

Katerina Maleeva Катерина Малеева
- Country (sports): Bulgaria
- Residence: Sofia
- Born: 7 May 1969 (age 57) Sofia
- Height: 1.68 m (5 ft 6 in)
- Turned pro: 1984
- Retired: 1997
- Plays: Right-handed (two-handed backhand)
- Prize money: US$2,220,371

Singles
- Career record: 369–210
- Career titles: 11
- Highest ranking: No. 6 (9 July 1990)

Grand Slam singles results
- Australian Open: QF (1990, 1991)
- French Open: QF (1990)
- Wimbledon: QF (1990, 1992)
- US Open: QF (1988, 1993)

Doubles
- Career record: 131–156
- Career titles: 2
- Highest ranking: No. 24 (12 September 1994)

Grand Slam doubles results
- Australian Open: R3 (1990, 1993)
- French Open: QF (1986, 1993)
- Wimbledon: R3 (1988, 1992, 1994)
- US Open: F (1994)

Team competitions
- Fed Cup: 29–22 (singles 20–9)

Katerina Georgieva Maleeva (Bulgarian: Катерина Георгиева Малеева; born 7 May 1969) is a former top 10 Bulgarian tennis player. She won eleven singles and two doubles WTA Tour titles. Her best position in the WTA rankings was No. 6 in 1990.

== Biography ==
Born in Sofia, Maleeva is the second oldest of the three children of Georgi Maleev and Yuliya Berberyan. Her mother came from an Armenian family, which found refuge in Bulgaria after the 1896 Armenian massacres in the Ottoman Empire, and was the best Bulgarian tennis player in the 1960s. After she retired from professional tennis in the 1970s, Berberyan started a coaching career. She was the coach of her three daughters, Katerina, Manuela and Magdalena, all of whom eventually became WTA top 10 players.

Throughout her professional career, Maleeva has won a total of 11 WTA singles titles and two titles in doubles. In July 1990, she achieved her career-high ranking of sixth. She has a record of 369 singles wins and 210 losses. In 1994, she married Georgi Stoimenov, before retiring in 1997. The couple have two children and currently live in Sofia.

== Grand Slam finals ==
=== Doubles: 1 (runner-up) ===
Result	W–L	Year	Championship	Surface	Partner	Opponents	Score
Loss	0–1	1994	US Open	Hard	(United States) Robin White	(Czech Republic) Jana Novotná (Spain) Arantxa Sánchez Vicario	3–6, 3–6

== Performance timelines ==
Key
W	F	SF	QF	#R	RR	Q#	DNQ	A	NH

(W) winner; (F) finalist; (SF) semifinalist; (QF) quarterfinalist; (#R) rounds 4, 3, 2, 1; (RR) round-robin stage; (Q#) qualification round; (DNQ) did not qualify; (A) absent; (NH) not held; (SR) strike rate (events won / competed); (W–L) win–loss record.

=== Singles ===
Tournament	1984	1985	1986	1987	1988	1989	1990	1991	1992	1993	1994	1995	1996	1997	SR	W-L	Win%
Grand Slam tournaments
Australian Open	A	3R	NH	A	A	A	QF	QF	4R	4R	1R	1R	Q1	A	0 / 7	16–7	70%
French Open	A	3R	4R	4R	1R	4R	QF	3R	2R	4R	2R	1R	Q2	A	0 / 11	22–11	67%
Wimbledon	A	1R	3R	1R	4R	A	QF	4R	QF	1R	1R	1R	A	A	0 / 10	16–10	62%
US Open	A	1R	3R	3R	QF	2R	4R	3R	3R	QF	2R	A	A	A	0 / 10	21–10	68%
Win–loss	0–0	4–4	7–3	5–3	7–3	4–2	15–4	11–4	10–4	10–4	2–4	0–3	0–0	0–0	0 / 38	75–38	66%
Year–end championships
WTA Championships	Did not qualify			1R	1R	DNQ	QF	1R	1R	Did not qualify					0 / 5	1–5	17%
National representation
Summer Olympics	A	Not Held			3R	Not Held			2R	Not Held			A	NH	0 / 2	2–2	50%
Fed Cup	QF	SF	QF	SF	A	QF	A	2R	1R	2R	QF	QF	A	A	0 / 10	20–9	69%
Career statistics
Titles	0	2	0	2	1	3	1	1	0	0	1	0	0	0	Career total: 11		
Finals	0	3	0	2	3	4	3	3	0	1	1	0	0	0	Career total: 20		
Year-end ranking	93	28	29	13	11	15	6	11	16	22	36	302	231	NR	$2,220,371		

=== Doubles ===
Tournament	1984	1985	1986	1987	1988	1989	1990	1991	1992	1993	1994	1995	1996	1997	SR	W-L	Win%
Australian Open	A	2R	NH	A	A	A	3R	1R	1R	3R	1R	1R	1R	A	0 / 8	5–8	38%
French Open	A	2R	QF	1R	2R	2R	2R	1R	3R	QF	1R	1R	A	A	0 / 11	12–11	52%
Wimbledon	A	1R	2R	1R	3R	A	1R	1R	3R	2R	3R	2R	A	A	0 / 10	9–10	47%
US Open	A	2R	1R	1R	1R	2R	A	1R	1R	2R	F	A	A	A	0 / 9	8–9	47%
Win–loss	0–0	3–4	4–3	0–3	3–3	2–2	3–3	0–4	4–4	7–4	7–4	1–3	0–1	0–0	0 / 38	34–38	47%
Career statistics
Titles	0	1	0	0	0	0	0	0	1	0	0	0	0	0	Career total: 2		
Finals	0	1	1	1	2	1	0	0	2	1	1	0	0	0	Career total: 10		
Year-end ranking	NR	NR	48	84	64	69	32	132	34	37	33	159	446	NR	$2,220,371		

== WTA career finals ==
=== Singles: 20 (11 titles, 9 runner-ups) ===
Legend Grand Slam tournaments (0–0) Tier I (0–2) Tier II (0–1) Tier III (2–2) Tier IV (1–2) Tier V / Virginia Slims (8–2)	Finals by surface Hard (5–4) Clay (4–4) Grass (0–0) Carpet (2–1)

Result	W–L	Date	Tournament	Tier	Surface	Opponent	Score
Win	1–0	Apr 1985	Seabrook Island, United States	Virginia Slims	Clay	(Romania) Virginia Ruzici	6–3, 6–3
Loss	1–1	Apr 1985	Orlando, United States	Virginia Slims	Clay	(United States) Martina Navratilova	1–6, 0–6
Win	2–1	Nov 1985	Hilversum, Netherlands	Virginia Slims	Carpet (i)	(Sweden) Carina Karlsson	6–3, 6–2
Win	3–1	Apr 1987	Tokyo, Japan	Virginia Slims	Hard	(United States) Barbara Gerken	6–2, 6–3
Win	4–1	Oct 1987	Athens, Greece	Virginia Slims	Clay	(France) Julie Halard	6–0, 6–1
Loss	4–2	Mar 1988	San Antonio, United States	Tier IV	Hard	(West Germany) Steffi Graf	4–6, 1–6
Loss	4–3	Jul 1988	Hamburg, West Germany	Tier IV	Clay	(West Germany) Steffi Graf	4–6, 2–6
Win	5–3	Oct 1988	Indianapolis, United States	Tier V	Hard (i)	(United States) Zina Garrison	6–3, 2–6, 6–2
Win	6–3	Jul 1989	Båstad, Sweden	Tier V	Clay	(West Germany) Sabine Hack	6–1, 6–3
Loss	6–4	Aug 1989	Sofia, Bulgaria	Tier V	Clay	(West Germany) Isabel Cueto	2–6, 6–7^{(3–7)}
Win	7–4	Oct 1989	Bayonne, France	Tier V	Hard (i)	(Spain) Conchita Martínez	6–2, 6–2
Win	8–4	Nov 1989	Indianapolis, United States	Tier V	Hard (i)	(Italy) Raffaella Reggi	6–4, 6–4
Win	9–4	Apr 1990	Houston, United States	Tier III	Clay	(Spain) Arantxa Sánchez Vicario	6–1, 1–6, 6–4
Loss	9–5	Apr 1990	Tampa, United States	Tier III	Clay	(Socialist Federal Republic of Yugoslavia) Monica Seles	1–6, 0–6
Loss	9–6	Aug 1990	Montreal, Canada	Tier I	Hard	(Germany) Steffi Graf	1–6, 7–6^{(8–6)}, 3–6
Loss	9–7	Aug 1991	Toronto, Canada	Tier I	Hard	(United States) Jennifer Capriati	2–6, 3–6
Loss	9–8	Aug 1991	Washington, United States	Tier II	Hard	(Spain) Arantxa Sánchez Vicario	2–6, 5–7
Win	10–9	Nov 1991	Indianapolis, United States	Tier IV	Hard	(United States) Audra Keller	7–6^{(7–1)}, 6–2
Loss	10–10	Nov 1993	Quebec City, Canada	Tier III	Carpet (i)	(France) Nathalie Tauziat	4–6, 1–6
Win	11–10	Nov 1994	Quebec City, Canada	Tier III	Carpet (i)	(Netherlands) Brenda Schultz	6–3, 6–3

=== Doubles: 10 (2 titles, 8 runner–ups) ===
Legend Grand Slam tournaments (0–1) Tier I (0–1) Tier II (1–0) Tier III (0–1) Tier IV (0–0) Tier V / Virginia Slims (1–5)	Finals by surface Hard (0–2) Clay (1–3) Grass (0–0) Carpet (1–3)

Result	W–L	Date	Tournament	Tier	Surface	Partner	Opponents	Score
Win	1–0	Jul 1985	Indianapolis, United States	Virginia Slims	Clay	(Bulgaria) Manuela Maleeva	(United States) Penny Barg (United States) Paula Smith	3–6, 6–3, 6–4
Loss	1–1	Sep 1986	Tokyo, Japan	Virginia Slims	Carpet (i)	(Bulgaria) Manuela Maleeva	(West Germany) Bettina Bunge (West Germany) Steffi Graf	1–6, 7–6^{(7–4)}, 2–6
Loss	1–2	Sep 1987	Tokyo, Japan	Virginia Slims	Carpet (i)	(Bulgaria) Manuela Maleeva	(United States) Anne White (United States) Robin White	1–6, 2–6
Loss	1–3	Jul 1988	Brussels, Belgium	Tier V	Clay	(Italy) Raffaella Reggi	(Argentina) Mercedes Paz (Denmark) Tine Scheuer-Larsen	6–7^{(3–7)}, 1–6
Loss	1–4	Aug 1988	Sofia, Bulgaria	Tier V	Hard	(Socialist Federal Republic of Yugoslavia) Sabrina Goleš	(Spain) Conchita Martínez (Austria) Barbara Paulus	6–1, 1–6, 4–6
Loss	1–5	Jul 1989	Båstad, Sweden	Tier V	Clay	(Socialist Federal Republic of Yugoslavia) Sabrina Goleš	(Argentina) Mercedes Paz (Denmark) Tine Scheuer-Larsen	2–6, 5–7
Win	2–5	Feb 1992	Essen, Germany	Tier II	Carpet (i)	(Germany) Barbara Rittner	(Belgium) Sabine Appelmans (Germany) Claudia Porwik	7–5, 6–3
Loss	2–6	May 1992	Rome, Italy	Tier I	Clay	(Germany) Barbara Rittner	(Socialist Federal Republic of Yugoslavia) Monica Seles (Czechoslovakia) Helena Suková	1–6, 2–6
Loss	2–7	Nov 1993	Quebec City, Canada	Tier III	Carpet (i)	(France) Nathalie Tauziat	(United States) Katrina Adams (Netherlands) Manon Bollegraf	4–6, 4–6
Loss	2–8	Sep 1994	US Open	Grand Slam	Hard	(United States) Robin White	(Czech Republic) Jana Novotná (Spain) Arantxa Sánchez Vicario	3–6, 3–6

== ITF Circuit finals ==
Legend
$100,000 tournaments
$75,000 tournaments
$50,000 tournaments
$25,000 tournaments
$10,000 tournaments

=== Singles: 2 (1–1) ===
Result	W–L	Date	Tournament	Tier	Surface	Opponent	Score
Win	1–0	Jun 1984	ITF Lyon, France	10,000	Clay	(Argentina) Mercedes Paz	7–6, 3–6, 6–2
Loss	1–1	Jul 1984	ITF Ortisei, Italy	10,000	Clay	(Italy) Laura Garrone	1–6, 5–7

=== Doubles: 1 (1–0) ===
Result	W–L	Date	Tournament	Tier	Surface	Partner	Opponents	Score
Win	1–0	Sep 1985	ITF Sofia, Bulgaria	25,000	Clay	(Bulgaria) Manuela Maleeva	(Czechoslovakia) Yvona Brzáková (Czechoslovakia) Hana Fukárková	6–1, 6–2

== Junior Grand Slam tournament finals ==
=== Singles: 2 (1 title, 1 runner-up) ===
In 1984 US open junior she defeated steffi graf in semis 7–5,7–6 & finally got the titles... but in doubles she partnered with steffi & lost in round 1 from niurka sodupe/shawn foltz 4–6,6–4,3–6

Result	W–L	Year	Championship	Surface	Opponent	Score
Loss	0–1	1984	French Open	Clay	(Argentina) Gabriela Sabatini	3–6, 7–5, 3–6
Win	1–1	1984	US Open	Hard	(United States) Niurka Sodupe	6–1, 6–2

== Fed Cup ==
Katerina Maleeva debuted for the Bulgaria Fed Cup team in 1984. Since then she has a 20–9 singles record and a 9–13 doubles record (29–22 overall).

=== Singles (20–9) ===
Edition	Round	Date	Against	Surface	Opponent	W/L	Result
1984 World Group I	R1	15 July 1984	Great Britain	Clay	(United Kingdom) Anne Hobbs	W	6–4, 3–6, 6–2
1984 World Group I	R2	16 July 1984	Soviet Union	Clay	(Soviet Union) Svetlana Cherneva	W	7–6, 6–3
1984 World Group I	QF	18 July 1984	Yugoslavia	Clay	(Socialist Federal Republic of Yugoslavia) Sabrina Goleš	L	4–6, 5–7
1985 World Group I	R1	6 October 1985	Soviet Union	Hard	(Soviet Union) Elena Eliseenko	W	6–4, 6–2
1985 World Group I	R2	8 October 1985	Yugoslavia	Hard	(Socialist Federal Republic of Yugoslavia) Mima Jaušovec	W	6–4, 6–2
1985 World Group I	QF	10 October 1985	Great Britain	Hard	(United Kingdom) Jo Durie	W	6–2, 4–6, 8–6
1985 World Group I	SF	12 October 1985	Czechoslovakia	Hard	(Czechoslovakia) Helena Suková	W	6–3, 7–6^{(6)}
1986 World Group I	R1	20 July 1986	Soviet Union	Clay	(Soviet Union) Natasha Zvereva	W	4–6, 6–1, 6–2
1986 World Group I	R2	21 July 1986	France	Clay	(France) Nathalie Tauziat	W	7–6^{(7–5)}, 7–6^{(6)}
1986 World Group I	QF	23 July 1986	West Germany	Clay	(West Germany) Bettina Bunge	L	6–2, 3–6, 3–6
1987 World Group I	R1	26 July 1987	Greece	Hard	(Greece) Olga Tsarbopoulou	W	6–0, 6–0
1987 World Group I	R2	27 July 1987	Indonesia	Hard	(Indonesia) Suzanna Anggarkusuma	W	6–1, 6–1
1987 World Group I	QF	29 July 1987	Australia	Hard	(Australia) Anne Minter	W	6–2, 6–2
1987 World Group I	SF	31 July 1987	United States	Hard	(United States) Pam Shriver	L	3–6, 6–7
1989 World Group I	R1	1 October 1989	South Korea	Hard	(South Korea) Im Sook-ja	W	6–2, 6–2
1989 World Group I	R2	3 October 1989	Argentina	Hard	(Argentina) Patricia Tarabini	W	6–1, 6–0
1989 World Group I	QF	5 October 1989	Australia	Hard	(Australia) Elizabeth Smylie	W	6–2, 6–1
1991 World Group I	R1	22 July 1991	Hungary	Hard	(Hungary) Virág Csurgó	W	6–0, 6–2
1991 World Group I	R2	24 July 1991	United States	Hard	(United States) Mary Joe Fernández	L	2–6, 1–6
1992 World Group I	R1	14 July 1992	Australia	Clay	(Australia) Nicole Bradtke	L	6–3, 4–6, 0–6
1992 World Group I	RPO	16 July 1992	Romania	Clay	(Romania) Irina Spîrlea	W	6–1, 6–0
1992 World Group I	RPO	17 July 1992	Hungary	Clay	(Hungary) Andrea Temesvári	W	6–3, 6–4
1993 World Group I	R1	19 July 1993	South Korea	Clay	(South Korea) Kim Yeon-sook	W	6–0, 6–2
1993 World Group I	R2	21 July 1993	Argentina	Clay	(Argentina) Inés Gorrochategui	L	1–6, 5–7
1994 World Group I	R1	19 July 1994	Croatia	Clay	(Croatia) Nadin Ercegović	W	6–0, 6–3
1994 World Group I	R2	21 July 1994	Indonesia	Clay	(Indonesia) Romana Tedjakusuma	W	6–2, 6–1
1994 World Group I	QF	22 July 1994	France	Clay	(France) Julie Halard	L	3–6, 6–3, 2–6
1995 World Group I	QF	22 April 1995	Spain	Carpet (i)	(Spain) Arantxa Sánchez Vicario	L	3–6, 3–6
1995 World Group I	QF	23 April 1995	Spain	Carpet (i)	(Spain) Conchita Martínez	L	2–6, 1–6

=== Doubles (9–13) ===
Edition	Round	Date	Partner	Against	Surface	Opponents	W/L	Result
1984 World Group I	R1	15 July 1984	(Bulgaria) Manuela Maleeva	Great Britain	Clay	(United Kingdom) Amanda Brown (United Kingdom) Anne Hobbs	W	7–6, 7–5
1984 World Group I	R2	16 July 1984	(Bulgaria) Manuela Maleeva	Soviet Union	Clay	(Soviet Union) Elena Eliseenko; (Soviet Union) Larisa Savchenko	L	7–5, 5–7, 1–6
1984 World Group I	QF	18 July 1984	(Bulgaria) Manuela Maleeva	Yugoslavia	Clay	(Socialist Federal Republic of Yugoslavia) Sabrina Goleš; (Socialist Federal Republic of Yugoslavia) Mima Jaušovec	L	3–6, 1–6
1985 World Group I	R1	6 October 1985	(Bulgaria) Manuela Maleeva	Soviet Union	Hard	(Soviet Union) Natalia Egorova (Soviet Union) Svetlana Cherneva	W	6–3, 7–5
1985 World Group I	R2	8 October 1985	(Bulgaria) Manuela Maleeva	Yugoslavia	Hard	(Socialist Federal Republic of Yugoslavia) Sabrina Goleš (Socialist Federal Republic of Yugoslavia) Aila Winkler	W	6–4, 7–6^{(7)}
1985 World Group I	QF	10 October 1985	(Bulgaria) Manuela Maleeva	Great Britain	Hard	(United Kingdom) Jo Durie; (United Kingdom) Anne Hobbs	L	4–5, Ret.
1985 World Group I	SF	12 October 1985	(Bulgaria) Manuela Maleeva	Czechoslovakia	Hard	(Czechoslovakia) Hana Mandlíková; (Czechoslovakia) Helena Suková	L	3–6, 6–7^{(4)}
1986 World Group I	R1	20 July 1986	(Bulgaria) Manuela Maleeva	Soviet Union	Clay	(Soviet Union) Svetlana Cherneva; (Soviet Union) Larisa Savchenko	L	6–1, 4–6, 1–6
1986 World Group I	QF	23 July 1986	(Bulgaria) Manuela Maleeva	West Germany	Clay	(West Germany) Bettina Bunge; (West Germany) Claudia Kohde-Kilsch	L	4–6, 2–6
1987 World Group I	SF	31 July 1987	(Bulgaria) Dora Rangelova	United States	Hard	(United States) Chris Evert; (United States) Pam Shriver	L	1–6, 1–6
1989 World Group I	R1	1 October 1989	(Bulgaria) Manuela Maleeva	South Korea	Hard	(South Korea) Kim Il-soon; (South Korea) Lee Jeong-myung	W	7–5, 6–0
1989 World Group I	R2	3 October 1989	(Bulgaria) Manuela Maleeva	Argentina	Hard	(Argentina) Florencia Labat; (Argentina) Mercedes Paz	W	6–1, 3–6, 6–1
1989 World Group I	QF	5 October 1989	(Bulgaria) Manuela Maleeva	Australia	Hard	(Australia) Elizabeth Smylie; (Australia) Janine Tremelling	L	7–5, 4–6, 0–6
1991 World Group I	R1	22 July 1991	(Bulgaria) Magdalena Maleeva	Hungary	Hard	(Hungary) Virág Csurgó; (Hungary) Ágnes Muzamel	W	6–1, 6–2
1991 World Group I	R2	24 July 1991	(Bulgaria) Magdalena Maleeva	United States	Hard	(United States) Gigi Fernández; (United States) Zina Garrison-Jackson	L	2–6, 1–6
1992 World Group I	R1	14 July 1992	(Bulgaria) Magdalena Maleeva	Australia	Hard	(Australia) Nicole Bradtke; (Australia) Rennae Stubbs	L	2–6, 1–6
1992 World Group I	RPO	17 July 1992	(Bulgaria) Elena Pampoulova	Hungary	Hard	(Hungary) Virág Csurgó (Hungary) Kata Györke	W	7–6^{(6)}, 4–6, 6–1
1993 World Group I	R1	19 July 1993	(Bulgaria) Lubomira Bacheva	South Korea	Clay	(South Korea) Kim Il-soon; (South Korea) Park Sung-hee	L	6–3, 6–7^{(2)}, 1–4 ret.
1993 World Group I	R2	21 July 1993	(Bulgaria) Magdalena Maleeva	Argentina	Clay	(Argentina) Inés Gorrochategui; (Argentina) Patricia Tarabini	L	7–5, 4–6, 2–6
1994 World Group I	R1	19 July 1994	(Bulgaria) Magdalena Maleeva	Croatia	Clay	(Croatia) Iva Majoli; (Croatia) Maja Murić	W	6–2, 6–3
1994 World Group I	QF	22 July 1994	(Bulgaria) Magdalena Maleeva	France	Clay	(France) Julie Halard; (France) Nathalie Tauziat	L	2–6, 6–3, 2–6
1995 World Group I	QF	23 April 1995	(Bulgaria) Magdalena Maleeva	Spain	Carpet (i)	(Spain) Neus Ávila Bonastre; (Spain) Virginia Ruano Pascual	W	6–0, 6–1

- RPO = Relegation Play-off

== See also ==
- Manuela Maleeva
- Magdalena Maleeva
- List of female tennis players
