= Danielle Scott (tennis) =

American tennis player

- Full name: Danielle Scott
- Country (sports): United States
- Born: March 22, 1970 (age 54)
- Prize money: $60,116

Singles
- Highest ranking: No. 258 (August 8, 1994)

Doubles
- Highest ranking: No. 75 (August 28, 1995)

Grand Slam doubles results
- Australian Open: 3R (1995)
- French Open: 1R (1995)
- Wimbledon: 1R (1995)
- US Open: 3R (1994)

Grand Slam mixed doubles results
- Wimbledon: 1R (1995)

Danielle Scott (born March 22, 1970) is a former professional tennis player from the United States.

== Biography ==
Scott attended Corona del Mar High School in Newport Beach, California and was a two-time All-American tennis player at the University of Arizona.

=== Professional tennis ===
In the 1990s she played on the professional tennis tour, where she made most of her WTA Tour appearances in doubles.

Ranked as high as 75 in doubles, Scott competed in the main draw of all four grand slam tournaments. At the 1994 US Open, she and Elly Hakami made the round of 16 of the women's doubles, as a wildcard pairing. She also reached the round of 16 of the women's doubles at the 1995 Australian Open with Wiltrud Probst, which included a win over sixth seeds Julie Halard-Decugis and Pam Shriver.
