= Erica Adams =

American tennis player (born 1969)

- Country (sports): United States
- Born: July 16, 1969 (age 56)
- Prize money: $34,603

Singles
- Career titles: 2 ITF
- Highest ranking: No. 215 (March 13, 1995)

Grand Slam singles results
- Wimbledon: Q1 (1995)
- US Open: Q2 (1994)

Doubles
- Career titles: 4 ITF
- Highest ranking: No. 203 (May 9, 1994)

Erica Adams (born July 16, 1969) is an American former professional tennis player.

== Biography ==
Born in 1969, she is the daughter of basketball player Bunk Adams, who was a Pan American Games gold medalist with the national team. She played college tennis for Purdue University from 1988 and 1991, earning All-Big Ten honors on four occasions.

Adams joined the professional tour in 1992 and went on to reach a best singles ranking of 215 in the world, appearing in the qualifying draws for both Wimbledon and the US Open. She played in the main draw of the Quebec WTA Tour tournament in 1994 and won two ITF titles. As a doubles player she won a further four ITF tournaments.

== ITF finals ==
$25,000 tournaments
$10,000 tournaments

=== Singles: 3 (2–1) ===
Outcome	No.	Date	Tournament	Surface	Opponent	Score
Winner	1.	March 22, 1993	Harare, Zimbabwe	Hard	(Zimbabwe) Cara Black	6–2, 6–3
Runner-up	1.	March 29, 1993	Gaborone, Botswana	Hard	(South Africa) Rene Mentz	4–6, 6–3, 3–6
Winner	2.	January 8, 1996	San Antonio, United States	Hard	(United States) Kelly Pace	6–3, 4–6, 6–3

=== Doubles: 7 (4–3) ===
Outcome	No.	Date	Tournament	Surface	Partner	Opponents	Score
Runner-up	1.	April 12, 1993	Gaborone, Botswana	Hard	(United States) Kelly Story	(Zimbabwe) Paula Iversen (United States) Claire Sessions Bailey	7–5, 1–6, 5–7
Winner	1.	January 31, 1994	Midland, United States	Hard	(United States) Jeri Ingram	(Australia) Tracey Rodgers (United States) Vickie Paynter	6–1, 5–7, 6–4
Runner-up	2.	January 15, 1996	Woodlands, United States	Hard	(United States) Claire Sessions Bailey	(Hungary) Nóra Köves (United States) Kelly Pace	5–7, 6–4, 2–6
Winner	2.	June 23, 1996	Peachtree, United States	Hard	(Georgia (country)) Nino Louarsabishvili	(Australia) Joanne Limmer (Australia) Lisa McShea	6–3, 7–6^{(7–4)}
Runner-up	3.	June 8, 1997	Little Rock, United States	Hard	(Norway) Tina Samara	(Australia) Amy Jensen (United States) Samantha Reeves	0–6, 4–6
Winner	3.	October 20, 1997	Puerto Vallarta, Mexico	Hard	(United States) Katie Schlukebir	(Turkey) Gülberk Gültekin (Nigeria) Clara Udofa	6–3, 6–4
Winner	4.	November 9, 1997	Santo Domingo, Dominican Republic	Clay	(United States) Rebecca Jensen	(Venezuela) Milagros Sequera (United States) Jacquelyn Rosen	6–3, 6–3
