= Mélanie Bernard =

Canadian tennis player

- Country (sports): Canada
- Born: 14 September 1974 (age 51) Jonquière, Quebec, Canada
- Plays: Right-handed
- Prize money: $55,341

Singles
- Highest ranking: No. 253 (31 July 1995)

Doubles
- Highest ranking: No. 90 (29 January 1996)

Grand Slam doubles results
- French Open: 3R (1995)
- Wimbledon: 1R (1995)

Mélanie Bernard (born 14 September 1974) is a former professional tennis player from Canada.

== Biography ==
A right-handed player from Quebec, Bernard had a best singles ranking of 253.

Bernard was most successful as a doubles player, ranked as high as 90 in the world, often partnering with Caroline Delisle. She and Delisle made the round of 16 at the 1994 French Open. The pair also competed together in the main draw of the 1995 Wimbledon Championships and took a set off top seeds Gigi Fernández and Natasha Zvereva in a first round loss.

== ITF finals ==
$25,000 tournaments
$10,000 tournaments

=== Doubles (4–6) ===
| Result | No. | Date | Tournament | Surface | Partner | Opponents | Score |
|---|---|---|---|---|---|---|---|
| Loss | 1. | 30 June 1991 | Covilhã, Portugal | Clay | (France) Olivia De Camaret | (United States) Kristine Jonkosky (Republic of Ireland) Siobhán Nicholson | 1–6, 3–6 |
| Win | 1. | 20 April 1992 | Nottingham, United Kingdom | Hard | (Canada) Caroline Delisle | (United States) Amy deLone (Australia) Lisa McShea | 6–3, 7–5 |
| Loss | 2. | 13 July 1992 | Evansville, United States | Hard | (Canada) Caroline Delisle | (Australia) Danielle Jones (South Africa) Tessa Price | 2–6, 6–4, 4–6 |
| Loss | 3. | 20 July 1992 | Roanoke, United States | Hard | (South Africa) Cindy Summers | (Australia) Danielle Jones (South Africa) Tessa Price | 2–6, 2–6 |
| Loss | 4. | 15 March 1993 | San Luis Potosí, Mexico | Hard | (Canada) Caroline Delisle | (United States) Sandra Cacic (Slovakia) Janette Husárová | 3–6, 6–3, 3–6 |
| Win | 2. | 22 March 1993 | St. Simons, United States | Clay | (Canada) Caroline Delisle | (Australia) Justine Hodder (Slovakia) Janette Husárová | 7–5, 3–6, 6–4 |
| Win | 3. | 16 May 1993 | León, Mexico | Clay | (Canada) Caroline Delisle | (Canada) Renata Kolbovic (Canada) Vanessa Webb | 3–6, 6–3, 6–1 |
| Win | 4. | 12 July 1993 | Winnipeg, Canada | Hard | (Canada) Caroline Delisle | (Slovakia) Janette Husárová (Japan) Hiromi Nagano | W/O |
| Loss | 5. | 17 July 1994 | Evansville, United States | Hard | (Canada) Maureen Drake | (United States) Michelle Jackson-Nobrega (United States) Shannan McCarthy | 6–4, 6–7^{(4)}, 3–6 |
| Loss | 6. | 18 September 1994 | Vancouver, Canada | Hard | (Canada) Caroline Delisle | (Canada) Marjorie Blackwood (Canada) Renata Kolbovic | 5–7, 2–6 |
