= Michelle Jackson-Nobrega =

American tennis player (born 1973)

- Country (sports): United States
- Born: December 28, 1973 (age 51); Brazil
- Prize money: $65,659

Singles
- Career titles: 2 ITF
- Highest ranking: No. 108 (March 13, 1995)

Doubles
- Career titles: 3 ITF
- Highest ranking: No. 107 (October 24, 1994)

Grand Slam doubles results
- US Open: 1R (1994)

Michelle Jackson-Nobrega (born 28 December 1973) is a former professional tennis player from the United States.

== Biography ==
Born in Brazil, Jackson-Nobrega moved back and forth between the United States and her birth country as a child, before her family settled permanently in Florida in the mid 1980s. She attended Cardinal Newman High School in West Palm Beach.

Jackson-Nobrega reached a best singles ranking of 108 in the world while competing on the professional tour in the 1990s. Her best WTA Tour performance came at the 1994 Lipton Championships in Miami, where she had wins over Caroline Kuhlman and Stephanie Rottier, then took seventh seed Lindsay Davenport to three sets in a third round loss. She made a grand slam main draw appearance at 1994 US Open, partnering Åsa Carlsson in the doubles.

She represented the United States in tennis at the World Outgames in 2017.

== ITF finals ==
$50,000 tournaments
$25,000 tournaments
$10,000 tournaments

=== Singles: 3 (2–1) ===
Result	No.	Date	Tournament	Surface	Opponent	Score
Win	1.	May 25, 1992	Orlando, United States	Clay	(United States) Tami Whitlinger-Jones	6–3, 6–1
Loss	1.	May 8, 1994	San Luis Potosí, Mexico	Hard	(South Africa) Mariaan de Swardt	3–6, 6–7
Win	2.	October 3, 1994	Rancho Mirage, United States	Hard	(United States) Stephanie Reece	6–0, 6–3

=== Doubles: 5 (3–2) ===
Result	No.	Date	Tournament	Surface	Partner	Opponents	Score
Win	1.	May 25, 1992	Orlando, United States	Clay	(United States) Trisha Laux	(Venezuela) María Vento-Kabchi (United States) Sandra Cacic	6–3, 2–6, 6–4
Loss	1.	June 15, 1992	St. Simons, United States	Clay	(United States) Sandra Cacic	(United States) Alysia May (United States) Stephanie Reece	3–6, 6–7^{(2)}
Win	2.	January 10, 1994	Misson, United States	Hard	(United States) Eleni Rossides	(United States) Jackie Moe (United States) Kelly Pace	6–4, 1–6, 6–4
Loss	2.	May 8, 1994	San Luis Potosí, Mexico	Hard	(Poland) Katarzyna Teodorowicz	(South Africa) Liezel Huber (South Africa) Mariaan de Swardt	6–4, 3–6, 4–6
Win	3.	July 11, 1994	Evansville, United States	Hard	(United States) Shannan McCarthy	(Canada) Maureen Drake (Canada) Mélanie Bernard	4–6, 7–6^{(4)}, 6–3
