= Caroline Delisle =

Canadian tennis player

- Country (sports): Canada
- Born: October 5, 1969 (age 56)
- Prize money: $63,286

Singles
- Highest ranking: No. 237 (February 28, 1994)

Doubles
- Highest ranking: No. 94 (January 15, 1996)

Grand Slam doubles results
- French Open: 3R (1995)
- Wimbledon: 1R (1995)
- US Open: 2R (1995)

Caroline Delisle (born October 5, 1969) is a former professional tennis player from Canada.

== Biography ==
Delisle, who grew up in the Quebec borough of Chicoutimi, played collegiate tennis at Oklahoma State University.

She competed on the professional tour in the 1990s, primarily as a doubles player.

Her most noted performance in singles came at the 1993 Canadian Open where she made the second round, with a win over Elizabeth Smylie.

At the 1994 Canadian Open she was a semi-finalist in the doubles, with Mélanie Bernard, who was her regular partner on the WTA Tour. They lost the semi-final in a third set tie-break, to Linda Harvey-Wild and Chanda Rubin.

In 1995 she reached a career best 94 in the world doubles rankings and appeared in the main draw of three grand slam tournaments that year. She made the third round of the 1995 French Open partnering Mélanie Bernard, before losing to eventual champions Gigi Fernández and Natasha Zvereva. At Wimbledon she and Bernard were beaten in the first round, then at the US Open she made it to the second round, with Nicole Pratt as her partner.

== ITF finals ==
$25,000 tournaments
$10,000 tournaments

=== Doubles (5–4) ===
Result	No.	Date	Tournament	Surface	Partner	Opponents	Score
Win	1.	20 April 1992	Nottingham, United Kingdom	Hard	(Canada) Mélanie Bernard	(United States) Amy deLone (Australia) Lisa McShea	6–3, 7–5
Loss	1.	13 July 1992	Evansville, United States	Hard	(Canada) Mélanie Bernard	(Australia) Danielle Jones (South Africa) Tessa Price	2–6, 6–4, 4–6
Loss	2.	1 February 1993	Midland, United States	Hard	(United States) Mamie Ceniza	(United States) Meredith McGrath (United States) Patty Fendick	6–7^{(5)}, 2–6
Loss	3.	15 March 1993	San Luis Potosí, Mexico	Hard	(Canada) Mélanie Bernard	(United States) Sandra Cacic (Slovakia) Janette Husárová	3–6, 6–3, 3–6
Win	2.	22 March 1993	St. Simons, United States	Clay	(Canada) Mélanie Bernard	(Australia) Justine Hodder (Slovakia) Janette Husárová	7–5, 3–6, 6–4
Win	3.	16 May 1993	León, Mexico	Clay	(Canada) Mélanie Bernard	(Canada) Renata Kolbovic (Canada) Vanessa Webb	3–6, 6–3, 6–1
Win	4.	12 July 1993	Winnipeg, Canada	Hard	(Canada) Mélanie Bernard	(Slovakia) Janette Husárová (Japan) Hiromi Nagano	W/O
Loss	4.	18 September 1994	Vancouver, Canada	Hard	(Canada) Mélanie Bernard	(Canada) Marjorie Blackwood (Canada) Renata Kolbovic	5–7, 2–6
Win	5.	31 July 1995	Mississauga, Canada	Hard	(Canada) Rene Simpson	(Germany) Kirstin Freye (Netherlands) Anique Snijders	6–3, 6–2
