= 1989 Puerto Rico Open – Singles =

Singles
- 1989 Puerto Rico Open

Final
- Champion: (Peru) Laura Gildemeister
- Runner-up: (United States) Gigi Fernández
- Score: 6–1, 6–2

Details
- Draw: 32 (4Q)
- Seeds: 8

Events
| Singles | Doubles |
| ← 1988 · | Puerto Rico Open | · 1990 → |

Anne Minter was the defending champion, but did not compete this year.

Laura Gildemeister won the title by defeating Gigi Fernández 6–1, 6–2 in the final.

== Seeds ==
1. (Soviet Union) Natasha Zvereva (semifinals)
2. (Canada) Helen Kelesi (semifinals)
3. (United States) Gigi Fernández (final)
4. (Peru) Laura Gildemeister (champion)
5. (Soviet Union) Leila Meskhi (first round)
6. (United States) Donna Faber (quarterfinals)
7. (Argentina) Patricia Tarabini (quarterfinals)
8. (United States) Beverly Bowes (first round)

== Draw ==
=== Key ===
- Q = Qualifier
- WC = Wild card
- LL = Lucky loser
- Alt = Alternate
- ITF = ITF entry
- PR = Protected ranking
- SR = Special ranking
- SE = Special exempt
- JE = Junior exempt
- JR = Junior Accelerator Programme entrant
- CO = College Accelerator Programme entrant
- NG = Next Gen Accelerator Program entrant
- w/o = Walkover
- r = Retired
- d = Defaulted

=== Finals ===
Semifinals
1 | (Soviet Union) Natasha Zvereva | 2 | 6^{3}
4 | (Peru) Laura Gildemeister | 6 | 7^{7}
3 | (United States) Gigi Fernández | 2 | 6 | 6
2 | (Canada) Helen Kelesi | 6 | 4 | 1

Final
4 | (Peru) Laura Gildemeister | 6 | 6
3 | (United States) Gigi Fernández | 1 | 2

=== Top half ===
First round
1 | (Soviet Union) N Zvereva | 6 | 6
(United States) C MacGregor | 1 | 2
(Soviet Union) N Medvedeva | 6 | 6
(Brazil) G Miró | 1 | 0
Q | (United States) S Collins | 6 | 6
(United Kingdom) M Javer | 4 | 2
(United States) R Reis | 6^{4} | 2
6 | (United States) D Faber | 7^{7} | 6
4 | (Peru) L Gildemeister | 6 | 6
(Australia) M Jaggard | 2 | 4
(Finland) P Thorén | 4 | 6 | 6
(Mexico) A Gavaldón | 6 | 4 | 3
(United States) M Werdel | 6 | 6
Q | (United States) A Schwartz | 2 | 0
(United States) C Benjamin | 6 | 6
8 | (United States) B Bowes | 4 | 1

Second round
1 | (Soviet Union) N Zvereva | 6 | 6
(Soviet Union) N Medvedeva | 4 | 1
Q | (United States) S Collins | 4 | 3
6 | (United States) D Faber | 6 | 6
4 | (Peru) L Gildemeister | 6 | 6
(Finland) P Thorén | 4 | 0
(United States) M Werdel | 7^{7} | 3 | 2
(United States) C Benjamin | 6^{2} | 6 | 6

Quarterfinals
1 | (Soviet Union) N Zvereva | 6 | 6
6 | (United States) D Faber | 2 | 0
4 | (Peru) L Gildemeister | 3 | 7 | 6
(United States) C Benjamin | 6 | 5 | 4

Semifinals
1 | (Soviet Union) N Zvereva | 2 | 6^{3}
4 | (Peru) L Gildemeister | 6 | 7^{7}

=== Bottom half ===
First round
5 | (Soviet Union) L Meskhi | 5 | 5
(Canada) R Simpson | 7 | 7
(United States) K Gompert | 6 | 6
(United States) J Ingram | 3 | 4
(United States) A Keller | 7^{7} | 6
(Argentina) F Haumüller | 6^{1} | 3
Q | (France) N van Lottum | 6 | 3 | 3
3 | (United States) G Fernández | 2 | 6 | 6
7 | (Argentina) P Tarabini | 6 | 6
Q | (Netherlands) H ter Riet | 4 | 2
(Poland) R Baranski | 6 | 6
(Japan) Y Koizumi | 3 | 4
(Argentina) C Tessi | 6 | 6
(Peru) P Vásquez | 1 | 4
(France) S Amiach | 3 | 4
2 | (Canada) H Kelesi | 6 | 6

Second round
(Canada) R Simpson | 6 | 7
(United States) K Gompert | 2 | 5
(United States) A Keller | 2 | 4
3 | (United States) G Fernández | 6 | 6
7 | (Argentina) P Tarabini | 2 | 6 | 6
(Poland) R Baranski | 6 | 4 | 3
(Argentina) C Tessi | 1 | 3
2 | (Canada) H Kelesi | 6 | 6

Quarterfinals
(Canada) R Simpson | 3 | 3
3 | (United States) G Fernández | 6 | 6
7 | (Argentina) P Tarabini | 4 | 0
2 | (Canada) H Kelesi | 6 | 6

Semifinals
3 | (United States) G Fernández | 2 | 6 | 6
2 | (Canada) H Kelesi | 6 | 4 | 1
