= 1985 U.S. Clay Court Championships – Women's singles =

Women's singles
- 1985 U.S. Clay Court Championships

Final
- Champion: (Hungary) Andrea Temesvári
- Runner-up: (United States) Zina Garrison
- Score: 7–6^{(7–0)}, 6–3

Events
Singles	men	women
Doubles	men	women
← 1984 ·	U.S. Clay Court Championships	· 1986 →

Top-seeded Manuela Maleeva was the defending champion but fell in the quarterfinals to Kate Gompert. Fourth-seed Andrea Temesvári claimed the title and $38,000 first prize money by defeating Zina Garrison in the final.

== Seeds ==
The top eight seeds received a bye into the second round. A champion seed is indicated in bold text while text in italics indicates the round in which that seed was eliminated.

1. (Bulgaria) Manuela Maleeva (quarterfinals)
2. (United States) Zina Garrison (final)
3. (Argentina) Gabriela Sabatini (semifinals)
4. (Hungary) **Andrea Temesvári (champion)**
5. (United States) Pam Casale (second round)
6. (United States) Kathy Horvath (third round)
7. (United States) Michelle Torres (third round)
8. (Bulgaria) Katerina Maleeva (third round)
9. (United States) Lisa Bonder (first round)
10. (United States) Terry Phelps (second round)
11. (Socialist Federal Republic of Yugoslavia) Sabrina Goleš (third round)
12. (United States) Susan Mascarin (third round)
13. (United States) Debbie Spence (quarterfinals)
14. (Italy) Raffaella Reggi (quarterfinals)

== Draw ==
=== Key ===
- Q = Qualifier
- WC = Wild card
- LL = Lucky loser
- Alt = Alternate
- SE = Special exempt
- PR = Protected ranking
- ITF = ITF entry
- JE = Junior exempt
- w/o = Walkover
- r = Retired
- d = Defaulted
- SR = Special ranking

=== Finals ===
Quarterfinals
1	(Bulgaria) Manuela Maleeva	3	**6**	6
**(United States) Kate Gompert**	**6**	1	**8**
4	**(Hungary) Andrea Temesvári**	**6**	**7**
14	(Italy) Raffaella Reggi	3	6
13	(United States) Debbie Spence	3	3
3	**(Argentina) Gabriela Sabatini**	**6**	**6**
Q	(United States) Anna Ivan	**7**	1	2
2	**(United States) Zina Garrison**	6	**6**	**6**

Semifinals
(United States) Kate Gompert	3	4
4	**(Hungary) Andrea Temesvári**	**6**	**6**
3	(Argentina) Gabriela Sabatini	4	2
2	**(United States) Zina Garrison**	**6**	**6**

Final
4	**(Hungary) Andrea Temesvári**	**7**	**6**
2	(United States) Zina Garrison	6	3

=== Top half ===
==== Section 1 ====
First round
**(United States) L Gates**	**6**	**7**
Q	(United States) Ann Hulbert	3	5
**(United States) K Cummings**	**6**	**6**
(United States) A Holton	1	0
(United States) T Mochizuki	**7**	2	1
11	**(Socialist Federal Republic of Yugoslavia) S Goleš**	5	**6**	**6**
10	**(United States) T Phelps**	**6**	**6**
(United States) K Kinney	2	3
**(United States) K Gompert**	**6**	**6**
(Japan) E Okagawa	0	1
(Czechoslovakia) L Plchová	6	**6**	3
**(Brazil) N Dias**	**7**	2	**6**

Second round
1	**(Bulgaria) M Maleeva**	**6**	**6**
(United States) L Gates	0	2
(United States) K Cummings	4	1
11	**(Socialist Federal Republic of Yugoslavia) S Goleš**	**6**	**6**
10	(United States) T Phelps	2	4
**(United States) K Gompert**	**6**	**6**
(Brazil) N Dias	2	4
8	**(Bulgaria) K Maleeva**	**6**	**6**

Third round
1	**(Bulgaria) M Maleeva**	**7**	4	**7**
11	(Socialist Federal Republic of Yugoslavia) S Goleš	5	**6**	5
**(United States) K Gompert**	**6**	**6**
8	(Bulgaria) K Maleeva	2	2

Quarterfinals
1	(Bulgaria) M Maleeva	3	**6**	6
**(United States) K Gompert**	**6**	1	**8**

==== Section 2 ====
First round
(Canada) M Groat	1	**7**	3
**(United States) G Purdy**	**6**	6	**6**
**(United States) C Benjamin**	**6**	**6**
(United States) B Herr	4	1
(Czechoslovakia) M Skuherská	1	4
Q	**(United States) B Bowes**	**6**	**6**
14	**(Italy) R Reggi**	**7**	1	**6**
(South Africa) R Uys	5	**6**	2
(United States) S Foltz	4	**6**	1
**(United States) V Nelson**	**6**	4	**6**
**(Canada) H Kelesi**	1	**7**	**9**
(Czechoslovakia) I Budařová	**6**	5	7

Second round
4	**(Hungary) A Temesvári**	**6**	**6**
(United States) G Purdy	1	3
(United States) C Benjamin	4	2
Q	**(United States) B Bowes**	**6**	**6**
14	**(Italy) R Reggi**	6	**6**	**6**
(United States) V Nelson	**7**	3	3
**(Canada) H Kelesi**	**6**	**6**
5	(United States) P Casale	4	2

Third round
4	**(Hungary) A Temesvári**	**6**	**6**
Q	(United States) B Bowes	1	2
14	**(Italy) R Reggi**	**6**	**6**
(Canada) H Kelesi	4	3

Quarterfinals
4	**(Hungary) A Temesvári**	**6**	**7**
14	(Italy) R Reggi	3	6

=== Bottom half ===
==== Section 3 ====
First round
**(United States) K Sands**	4	**6**	**6**
LL	(United States) K Steinmetz	**6**	1	4
Q	**(United States) M Schillig**	**6**	**6**
(United States) L McNeil	2	2
(United States) P Barg	5	4
13	**(United States) D Spence**	**7**	**6**
12	**(United States) S Mascarin**	**6**	**6**
(Argentina) M Paz	4	2
(United States) E Raponi-Longo	1	**6**	2
**(United States) L Spain-Short**	**6**	2	**6**
Q	(United States) C Hofer	2	3
**(United States) Jane Holdren**	**6**	**6**

Second round
7	**(United States) M Torres**	**6**	2	**6**
(United States) K Sands	3	**6**	4
Q	(United States) M Schillig	0	2
13	**(United States) D Spence**	**6**	**6**
12	**(United States) S Mascarin**	**6**	**6**
(United States) L Spain-Short	2	4
(United States) J Holdren	0	0
3	**(Argentina) G Sabatini**	**6**	**6**

Third round
7	(United States) M Torres	1	3
13	**(United States) D Spence**	**6**	**6**
12	(United States) S Mascarin	3	2
3	**(Argentina) G Sabatini**	**6**	**6**

Quarterfinals
13	(United States) D Spence	3	3
3	**(Argentina) G Sabatini**	**6**	**6**

==== Section 4 ====
First round
Q	(United States) W Wood	5	6
**(Czechoslovakia) R Maršíková**	**7**	**7**
(United States) S Rimes	2	5
Q	**(United States) A Ivan**	**6**	**7**
**(Peru) L Arraya**	**6**	3	**6**
9	(United States) L Bonder	1	**6**	4
Q	(United States) L Bernstein	2	3
**(United States) P Fendick**	**6**	**6**
(United States) G Rush	3	3
**(United States) J Klitch**	**6**	**6**
**(United States) P Smith**	**6**	**6**
Q	(United States) J Forman	3	3

Second round
6	**(United States) K Horvath**	**7**	**6**
(Czechoslovakia) R Maršíková	5	2
Q	**(United States) A Ivan**	**6**	5	**7**
(Peru) L Arraya	3	**7**	5
(United States) P Fendick	**6**	3	9
**(United States) J Klitch**	2	**6**	**11**
(United States) P Smith	3	1
2	**(United States) Z Garrison**	**6**	**6**

Third round
6	(United States) K Horvath	4	0
Q	**(United States) A Ivan**	**6**	**6**
(United States) J Klitch	1	**6**	6
2	**(United States) Z Garrison**	**6**	2	**8**

Quarterfinals
Q	(United States) A Ivan	**7**	1	2
2	**(United States) Z Garrison**	6	**6**	**6**
