= 1986 U.S. Clay Court Championships – Women's singles =

Women's singles
- 1986 U.S. Clay Court Championships

Final
- Champion: (West Germany) Steffi Graf
- Runner-up: (Argentina) Gabriela Sabatini
- Score: 2–6, 7–6^{(7–5)}, 6–4

Details
- Draw: 56
- Seeds: 14

Events
Singles	men	women
Doubles	men	women
← 1985 ·	U.S. Clay Court Championships

Top-seeded Steffi Graf claimed the title and $38,000 prize money by defeating Gabriela Sabatini in the final, after saving one match point.

== Seeds ==
The top eight seeds received a bye into the second round. A champion seed is indicated in bold text while text in italics indicates the round in which that seed was eliminated.

1. (West Germany) Steffi Graf **(champion)**
2. (Bulgaria) Manuela Maleeva (semifinals)
3. (Argentina) Gabriela Sabatini (final)
4. (United States) Kathy Jordan (second round)
5. (United States) Terry Phelps (quarterfinals)
6. (United States) Kate Gompert (third round)
7. (United States) Robin White (quarterfinals)
8. (Italy) Sandra Cecchini (second round)
9. (Canada) Helen Kelesi (third round)
10. (United States) Ann Henricksson (first round)
11. (United States) Debbie Spence (third round)
12. (United States) Anna Ivan (first round)
13. (Australia) Elizabeth Smylie (first round)
14. (United States) Molly Van Nostrand (first round)

== Draw ==
=== Key ===
- Q = Qualifier
- WC = Wild card
- LL = Lucky loser
- Alt = Alternate
- SE = Special exempt
- PR = Protected ranking
- ITF = ITF entry
- JE = Junior exempt
- w/o = Walkover
- r = Retired
- d = Defaulted
- SR = Special ranking

=== Finals ===
Quarterfinals
1	**(West Germany) Steffi Graf**	**6**	**6**
5	(United States) Terry Phelps	4	3
(United States) Melissa Gurney	6	3
**(Argentina) Mercedes Paz**	**7**	**6**
7	(United States) Robin White	1	5
3	**(Argentina) Gabriela Sabatini**	**6**	**7**
(Czechoslovakia) Regina Maršíková	5	2
2	**(Bulgaria) Manuela Maleeva**	**7**	**6**

Semifinals
1	**(West Germany) Steffi Graf**	**6**	**6**
(Argentina) Mercedes Paz	3	2
3	**(Argentina) Gabriela Sabatini**	**6**	**6**
2	(Bulgaria) Manuela Maleeva	4	4

Final
1	**(West Germany) Steffi Graf**	2	**7**	**6**
3	(Argentina) Gabriela Sabatini	**6**	6	4

=== Top half ===
==== Section 1 ====
First round
Q	(United States) R Reis	2	1
**(United States) MJ Fernández**	**6**	**6**
**(South Africa) Y Vermaak**	**6**	**6**
(United States) K Kinney	3	1
**(United States) P Barg**	**7**	**6**
12	(United States) A Ivan	6	1
10	(United States) A Henricksson	4	3
**(United States) C Benjamin**	**6**	**6**
**(Italy) L Garrone**	**7**	**6**
(United States) B Gerken	6	1
(United States) T Mochizuki	2	3
**(Denmark) T Scheuer-Larsen**	**6**	**6**

Second round
1	**(West Germany) S Graf**	**6**	**6**
(United States) MJ Fernández	3	1
**(South Africa) Y Vermaak**	**6**	**6**
(United States) P Barg	2	4
(United States) C Benjamin	1	**7**	3
**(Italy) L Garrone**	**6**	5	**6**
(Denmark) T Scheuer-Larsen	2	2
5	**(United States) T Phelps**	**6**	**6**

Third round
1	**(West Germany) S Graf**	**6**	**6**
(South Africa) Y Vermaak	0	2
(Italy) L Garrone	2	2
5	**(United States) T Phelps**	**6**	**6**

Quarterfinals
1	**(West Germany) S Graf**	**6**	**6**
5	(United States) T Phelps	4	3

==== Section 2 ====
First round
**(United States) M Gurney**	**6**	**6**
(United States) A Smith	4	3
Q	**(Peru) P Vásquez**	**6**	**6**
(United States) J Klitch	1	0
**(United States) P Casale**	**6**	**6**
14	(United States) M Van Nostrand	2	1
(Peru) L Gildemeister	4	2
**(United States) V Nelson-Dunbar**	**6**	**6**
(United States) M L Piatek	4	4
**(United States) L-A Thompson**	**6**	**6**
Q	(Italy) C Nozzoli	2	0
**(Argentina) M Paz**	**6**	**6**

Second round
4	(United States) K Jordan	6	**6**	5
**(United States) M Gurney**	**7**	3	**7**
Q	(Peru) P Vásquez	1	1
**(United States) P Casale**	**6**	**6**
(United States) V Nelson-Dunbar	3	2
**(United States) L-A Thompson**	**6**	**6**
**(Argentina) M Paz**	4	**7**	**6**
8	(Italy) S Cecchini	**6**	5	1

Third round
**(United States) M Gurney**	**6**	**6**
(United States) P Casale	2	4
(United States) L-A Thompson	5	2
**(Argentina) M Paz**	**7**	**6**

Quarterfinals
(United States) M Gurney	6	3
**(Argentina) M Paz**	**7**	**6**

=== Bottom half ===
==== Section 3 ====
First round
(United States) A Holton	1	5
Q	**(West Germany) G Dinu**	**6**	**7**
Q	(United States) H Cioffi	5	4
Q	**(South Africa) E Reinach**	**7**	**6**
**(South Africa) J Mundel**	**6**	5	**6**
13	(Australia) E Smylie	3	**7**	4
11	**(United States) D Spence**	5	**6**	**6**
(Sweden) M Lindström	**7**	4	2
(United States) C Fernandez	6	6
**(United States) G Fernández**	**7**	**6**
Q	(United States) J Forman	4	4
**(United States) S Foltz**	**6**	**6**

Second round
7	**(United States) R White**	4	**6**	**6**
Q	(West Germany) G Dinu	**6**	4	0
Q	**(South Africa) E Reinach**	**6**	**7**
(South Africa) J Mundel	3	5
11	**(United States) D Spence**	**7**	3	**6**
(United States) G Fernández	5	**6**	4
(United States) S Foltz	1	0
3	**(Argentina) G Sabatini**	**6**	**6**

Third round
7	**(United States) R White**	**6**	**6**
Q	(South Africa) E Reinach	1	4
11	(United States) D Spence	5	2
3	**(Argentina) G Sabatini**	**7**	**6**

Quarterfinals
7	(United States) R White	1	5
3	**(Argentina) G Sabatini**	**6**	**7**

==== Section 4 ====
First round
**(United States) L McNeil**	**7**	**6**
(United States) L Antonoplis	5	2
**(United States) G Kim**	**6**	**7**
(United States) J Russell	4	5
**(Czechoslovakia) R Maršíková**	4	**6**	**6**
(United States) S Sloane	**6**	0	3
9	**(Canada) H Kelesi**	**6**	**6**
(France) S Amiach	2	2
**(United States) M Torres**	**7**	**6**
Q	(United States) C MacGregor	6	1
(France) C Suire	2	**6**	4
**(Argentina) A Villagrán**	**6**	0	**6**

Second round
6	**(United States) K Gompert**	**6**	**6**
(United States) L McNeil	0	3
(United States) G Kim	1	1
**(Czechoslovakia) R Maršíková**	**6**	**6**
9	**(Canada) H Kelesi**	6	**6**	**6**
(United States) M Torres	**7**	2	1
(Argentina) A Villagrán	1	1
2	**(Bulgaria) M Maleeva**	**6**	**6**

Third round
6	(United States) K Gompert	**6**	2	6
**(Czechoslovakia) R Maršíková**	1	**6**	**7**
9	(Canada) H Kelesi	3	1
2	**(Bulgaria) M Maleeva**	**6**	**6**

Quarterfinals
(Czechoslovakia) R Maršíková	5	2
2	**(Bulgaria) M Maleeva**	**7**	**6**
