= 1985 U.S. Clay Court Championships – Women's doubles =

Women's doubles
- 1985 U.S. Clay Court Championships

Final
- Champions: (Bulgaria) Katerina Maleeva (Bulgaria) Manuela Maleeva
- Runners-up: (United States) Penny Barg (United States) Paula Smith
- Score: 3–6, 6–3, 6–4

Events
| Singles | men | women |
| Doubles | men | women |
| ← 1984 · | U.S. Clay Court Championships | · 1986 → |

Seventh-seeded sisters Katerina Maleeva and Manuela Maleeva claimed the title by defeating third-seeds Penny Barg and Paula Smith in the final.

== Seeds ==
A champion seed is indicated in bold text while text in italics indicates the round in which that seed was eliminated.

1. (United States) Kathy Horvath / (Hungary) Andrea Temesvári (quarterfinals)
2. (United States) Zina Garrison / (United States) Lori McNeil (quarterfinals)
3. (United States) Penny Barg / (United States) Paula Smith (final)
4. (United States) Beth Herr / (United States) Terry Phelps (semifinals)
5. (Argentina) Mercedes Paz / (Argentina) Adriana Villagrán (quarterfinals)
6. (United States) Camille Benjamin / (United States) Kim Sands (second round)
7. (Bulgaria) **Katerina Maleeva / (Bulgaria) Manuela Maleeva (champions)**
8. (United States) Pam Casale / (United States) Susan Mascarin (first round)

== Draw ==
=== Key ===
- Q = Qualifier
- WC = Wild card
- LL = Lucky loser
- Alt = Alternate
- SE = Special exempt
- PR = Protected ranking
- ITF = ITF entry
- JE = Junior exempt
- w/o = Walkover
- r = Retired
- d = Defaulted
- SR = Special ranking

=== Finals ===
Semifinals
(Czechoslovakia) Iva Budařová (Czechoslovakia) Marcela Skuherská | 4 | 2
3 | **(United States) Penny Barg** **(United States) Paula Smith** | **6** | **6**
4 | (United States) Beth Herr (United States) Terry Phelps | 3 | **6** | 3
7 | **(Bulgaria) Katerina Maleeva** **(Bulgaria) Manuela Maleeva** | **6** | 1 | **6**

Final
3 | (United States) Penny Barg (United States) Paula Smith | **6** | 3 | 4
7 | **(Bulgaria) Katerina Maleeva** **(Bulgaria) Manuela Maleeva** | 3 | **6** | **6**

=== Top half ===
First round
1 | **(United States) K Horvath** **(Hungary) A Temesvári** | **6** | **6**
(Japan) E Okagawa (New Zealand) B Perry | 1 | 4
**(United States) A Hulbert** **(United States) G Rush** | **6** | **6**
(United States) K Kinney (Australia) P Whytcross | 2 | 1
**(United States) J Goodling** **(United States) V Nelson** | **7** | **6**
(United States) S Rimes (South Africa) R Uys | 5 | 1
**(Czechoslovakia) I Budařová** **(Czechoslovakia) M Skuherská** | **6** | **6**
8 | (United States) P Casale (United States) S Mascarin | 4 | 3
3 | **(United States) P Barg** **(United States) P Smith** | **6** | **6**
(Czechoslovakia) R Maršíková (United States) L Spain-Short | 3 | 1
**(Socialist Federal Republic of Yugoslavia) S Goleš** **(United States) E Raponi-Longo** | **6** | **6**
(Australia) R Bryant (United States) K Copeland | 0 | 4
**(United States) K Huebner** **(United States) K Steinmetz** | **7** | **7**
(United States) B Bowes (United States) J Callen | 6 | 5
(United States) D Farrell (United States) C Watson | 5 | **6** | 4
6 | **(United States) C Benjamin** **(United States) K Sands** | **7** | 3 | **6**

Second round
1 | **(United States) K Horvath** **(Hungary) A Temesvári** | **6** | **6**
(United States) A Hulbert (United States) G Rush | 3 | 1
(United States) J Goodling (United States) V Nelson | 2 | 4
**(Czechoslovakia) I Budařová** **(Czechoslovakia) M Skuherská** | **6** | **6**
3 | **(United States) P Barg** **(United States) P Smith** | 4 | **6** | **6**
(Socialist Federal Republic of Yugoslavia) S Goleš (United States) E Raponi-Longo | **6** | 4 | 1
**(United States) K Huebner** **(United States) K Steinmetz** | 2 | **7** | **8**
6 | (United States) C Benjamin (United States) K Sands | **6** | 5 | 6

Quarterfinals
1 | (United States) K Horvath (Hungary) A Temesvári | 3 | 1
**(Czechoslovakia) I Budařová** **(Czechoslovakia) M Skuherská** | **6** | **6**
3 | **(United States) P Barg** **(United States) P Smith** | **6** | **6**
(United States) K Huebner (United States) K Steinmetz | 3 | 3

Semifinals
(Czechoslovakia) I Budařová (Czechoslovakia) M Skuherská | 4 | 2
3 | **(United States) P Barg** **(United States) P Smith** | **6** | **6**

=== Bottom half ===
First round
5 | **(Argentina) M Paz** **(Argentina) A Villagrán** | **6** | **7**
(United States) H Manset (United States) M Schillig | 1 | 5
(United States) R Blount (Czechoslovakia) L Plchová | **6** | 6 | 4
**(United States) P Fendick** **(United States) M Quinlan** | 4 | **7** | **6**
**(New Zealand) B Cordwell** **(New Zealand) J Richardson** | **6** | **6**
(Brazil) N Dias (United States) S Foltz | 1 | 2
(United States) A Holton (United States) J Klitch | 4 | 1
4 | **(United States) B Herr** **(United States) T Phelps** | **6** | **6**
7 | **(Bulgaria) K Maleeva** **(Bulgaria) M Maleeva** | **6** | 4 | **6**
(United States) G Purdy (United States) D Spence | 2 | **6** | 2
**(United States) H Crowe** **(United States) L Gates** | **6** | 5 | **6**
(United States) A-M Fernandez (United States) C Fernandez | 4 | **7** | 4
(United States) J Forman (United States) S Margolin | **6** | 3 | 0
**(United States) T Mochizuki** **(Socialist Federal Republic of Yugoslavia) R Šašak** | 3 | **6** | **6**
(United States) L Bonder (Peru) L Gildemeister | **6** | 3 | 4
2 | **(United States) Z Garrison** **(United States) L McNeil** | 4 | **6** | **6**

Second round
5 | **(Argentina) M Paz** **(Argentina) A Villagrán** | 2 | **6** | **6**
(United States) P Fendick (United States) M Quinlan | **6** | 0 | 1
(New Zealand) B Cordwell (New Zealand) J Richardson | **6** | 1 | 5
4 | **(United States) B Herr** **(United States) T Phelps** | 3 | **6** | **7**
7 | **(Bulgaria) K Maleeva** **(Bulgaria) M Maleeva** | 4 | **6** | **6**
(United States) H Crowe (United States) L Gates | **6** | 3 | 4
(United States) T Mochizuki (Socialist Federal Republic of Yugoslavia) R Šašak | 5 | 2
2 | **(United States) Z Garrison** **(United States) L McNeil** | **7** | **6**

Quarterfinals
5 | (Argentina) M Paz (Argentina) A Villagrán | **6** | 4 | 0
4 | **(United States) B Herr** **(United States) T Phelps** | 3 | **6** | **6**
7 | **(Bulgaria) K Maleeva** **(Bulgaria) M Maleeva** | **6** | 5 | **6**
2 | (United States) Z Garrison (United States) L McNeil | 4 | **7** | 2

Semifinals
4 | (United States) B Herr (United States) T Phelps | 3 | **6** | 3
7 | **(Bulgaria) K Maleeva** **(Bulgaria) M Maleeva** | **6** | 1 | **6**
