= 1990 Puerto Rico Open – Doubles =

Doubles
- 1990 Puerto Rico Open

Final
- Champions: (Soviet Union) Elena Brioukhovets (Soviet Union) Natalia Medvedeva
- Runners-up: (United States) Amy Frazier (New Zealand) Julie Richardson
- Score: 6–4, 6–2

Details
- Draw: 16 (1WC)
- Seeds: 4

Events
Singles	Doubles
- Puerto Rico Open

There were no defending champions in this edition, as the last year final was cancelled due to rain. Patty Fendick and Jill Hetherington, winners of the 1988 edition, did not compete this year.

Elena Brioukhovets and Natalia Medvedeva won the title by defeating Amy Frazier and Julie Richardson 6–4, 6–2 in the final.

== Seeds ==
1. (United States) Gigi Fernández / (United States) Zina Garrison (first round)
2. (United States) Meredith McGrath / (United States) Lori McNeil (quarterfinals, withdrew)
3. (Australia) Nicole Provis / (South Africa) Elna Reinach (first round)
4. (United States) Katrina Adams / (United States) Penny Barg-Mager (semifinals)

== Draw ==
Key

- Q = Qualifier
- WC = Wild card
- LL = Lucky loser
- Alt = Alternate
- ITF = ITF entry
- PR = Protected ranking
- SR = Special ranking
- SE = Special exempt
- JE = Junior exempt
- JR = Junior Accelerator Programme entrant
- CO = College Accelerator Programme entrant
- NG = Next Gen Accelerator Program entrant
- w/o = Walkover
- r = Retired
- d = Defaulted

=== Draw ===
First round
1	(United States) G Fernández (United States) Z Garrison	3	6^{5}
(United States) C Benjamin (United States) Ca MacGregor	6	7^{7}
WC	(Puerto Rico) Maribel Amadeo (Puerto Rico) Camille Baldrich	1	2
(United States) A Frazier (New Zealand) J Richardson	6	6
4	(United States) K Adams (United States) P Barg-Mager	6	6
(Denmark) S Albinus (Brazil) L Corsato	3	4
(Italy) L Ferrando (Sweden) M Strandlund	6	6
(United Kingdom) S Smith (Netherlands) H ter Riet	4	2
(Canada) H Kelesi (Italy) R Reggi	6	6
(Argentina) B Fulco (Argentina) F Labat	3	4
(Soviet Union) E Brioukhovets (Soviet Union) N Medvedeva	6	7^{7}
3	(Australia) N Provis (South Africa) E Reinach	3	6^{4}
(United States) C Cunningham (Argentina) F Haumüller	4	1
(United States) A Grossman (Australia) R Stubbs	6	6
(South Africa) L Barnard (United States) W White-Prausa	5	4
2	(United States) M McGrath (United States) L McNeil	7	6

Quarterfinals
(United States) C Benjamin (United States) Ca MacGregor	3	7	2
(United States) A Frazier (New Zealand) J Richardson	6	5	6
4	(United States) K Adams (United States) P Barg-Mager	6	6
(Italy) L Ferrando (Sweden) M Strandlund	3	2
(Canada) H Kelesi (Italy) R Reggi	2	4
(Soviet Union) E Brioukhovets (Soviet Union) N Medvedeva	6	6
(United States) A Grossman (Australia) R Stubbs	w/o
2	(United States) M McGrath (United States) L McNeil

Semifinals
(United States) A Frazier (New Zealand) J Richardson	4	6	6
4	(United States) K Adams (United States) P Barg-Mager	6	3	4
(Soviet Union) E Brioukhovets (Soviet Union) N Medvedeva	7	6
(United States) A Grossman (Australia) R Stubbs	5	3

Final
(United States) A Frazier (New Zealand) J Richardson	4	2
(Soviet Union) E Brioukhovets (Soviet Union) N Medvedeva	6	6
