= 1985 U.S. Clay Court Championships – Men's singles =

Men's singles
- 1985 U.S. Clay Court Championships

Final
- Champion: (Czechoslovakia) Ivan Lendl
- Runner-up: (Ecuador) Andrés Gómez
- Score: 6–1, 6–3

Details
- Draw: 56
- Seeds: 16

Events
Singles	men	women
Doubles	men	women
- U.S. Clay Court Championships

Top-seeded Ivan Lendl overcame the defending champion, Andrés Gómez, in the final to claim his fifth title of the year and $51,000 prize money.

== Seeds ==
The top eight seeds received a bye into the second round. A champion seed is indicated in bold text while text in italics indicates the round in which that seed was eliminated.

1. (Czechoslovakia) **Ivan Lendl (champion)**
2. (Ecuador) Andrés Gómez (final)
3. (West Germany) Boris Becker (semifinals)
4. (France) Yannick Noah (semifinals)
5. (Czechoslovakia) Miloslav Mečíř (quarterfinals)
6. (United States) Aaron Krickstein (second round)
7. (Argentina) José Luis Clerc (third round)
8. (Argentina) Martín Jaite (quarterfinals)
9. (Czechoslovakia) Libor Pimek (third round)
10. (Argentina) Guillermo Vilas (third round)
11. (Italy) Francesco Cancellotti (third round)
12. (West Germany) Hans Schwaier (quarterfinals)
13. (United States) Mark Dickson (second round)
14. (Spain) Juan Aguilera (first round)
15. (France) Guy Forget (third round)
16. (Argentina) Horacio de la Peña (first round)

== Draw ==
Key

- Q = Qualifier
- WC = Wild card
- LL = Lucky loser
- Alt = Alternate
- ITF = ITF entry
- PR = Protected ranking
- SR = Special ranking
- SE = Special exempt
- JE = Junior exempt
- JR = Junior Accelerator Programme entrant
- CO = College Accelerator Programme entrant
- NG = Next Gen Accelerator Program entrant
- w/o = Walkover
- r = Retired
- d = Defaulted

=== Finals ===
Quarterfinals
1	**(Czechoslovakia) Ivan Lendl**	**6**	**6**
8	(Argentina) Martín Jaite	2	3
3	**(West Germany) Boris Becker**	**6**	**7**
5	(Czechoslovakia) Miloslav Mečíř	2	5
12	(West Germany) Hans Schwaier	3	1
4	**(France) Yannick Noah**	**6**	**6**
(Czechoslovakia) Jaroslav Navrátil	2	3
2	**(Ecuador) Andrés Gómez**	**6**	**6**

Semifinals
1	**(Czechoslovakia) Ivan Lendl**	5	**6**	**6**
3	(West Germany) Boris Becker	**7**	2	2
4	(France) Yannick Noah	0	1
2	**(Ecuador) Andrés Gómez**	**6**	**6**

Final
1	**(Czechoslovakia) Ivan Lendl**	**6**	**6**
2	(Ecuador) Andrés Gómez	1	3

=== Top half ===
==== Section 1 ====
First round
(Argentina) E Bengoechea	**6**	6	6
**(Socialist Federal Republic of Yugoslavia) S Živojinović**	4	**7**	**8**
**(Chile) H Gildemeister**	**6**	0	**6**
(West Germany) W Popp	4	**6**	2
(Spain) F Luna	3	**6**	2
15	**(France) G Forget**	**6**	4	**6**
10	**(Argentina) G Vilas**	**6**	**6**
(Peru) P Arraya	2	3
Q	(United States) R Brown	4	5
**(Czechoslovakia) P Složil**	**6**	**7**
Q	**(United States) N Schellenger**	**6**	**6**
LL	(United States) M Wooldridge	3	1

Second round
1	**(Czechoslovakia) I Lendl**	**6**	**6**
(Socialist Federal Republic of Yugoslavia) S Živojinović	4	0
(Chile) H Gildemeister	3	2
15	**(France) G Forget**	**6**	**6**
10	**(Argentina) G Vilas**	**6**	**6**
(Czechoslovakia) P Složil	4	3
Q	(United States) N Schellenger	3	6
8	**(Argentina) M Jaite**	**6**	**7**

Third round
1	**(Czechoslovakia) I Lendl**	**6**	**6**
15	(France) G Forget	0	2
10	(Argentina) G Vilas	0	1
8	**(Argentina) M Jaite**	**6**	**6**

Quarterfinals
1	**(Czechoslovakia) I Lendl**	**6**	**6**
8	(Argentina) M Jaite	2	3

==== Section 2 ====
First round
Q	**(Sweden) M Pernfors**	**7**	**6**
(Spain) A Tous	5	4
Q	(United States) M Buckley	3	0^{r}
WC	**(United States) G Bezecny**	**6**	3
(Italy) C Panatta	2	5
11	**(Italy) F Cancellotti**	**6**	**7**
14	(Spain) J Aguilera	4	4
**(Argentina) M Ingaramo**	**6**	**6**
**(United States) B Willenborg**	**6**	**6**
(New Zealand) C Lewis	4	4
Q	**(Zimbabwe) P Tuckniss**	5	**6**	**6**
WC	(United States) T Witsken	**7**	2	4

Second round
3	**(West Germany) B Becker**	4	**7**	**6**
Q	(Sweden) M Pernfors	**6**	6	2
WC	(United States) G Bezecny	4	6
11	**(Italy) F Cancellotti**	**6**	**7**
(Argentina) M Ingaramo	3	1
**(United States) B Willenborg**	**6**	**6**
Q	(Zimbabwe) P Tuckniss	4	1
5	**(Czechoslovakia) M Mečíř**	**6**	**6**

Third round
3	**(West Germany) B Becker**	**6**	**6**
11	(Italy) F Cancellotti	4	2
(United States) B Willenborg	1	4
5	**(Czechoslovakia) M Mečíř**	**6**	**6**

Quarterfinals
3	**(West Germany) B Becker**	**6**	**7**
5	(Czechoslovakia) M Mečíř	2	5

=== Bottom half ===
==== Section 3 ====
First round
Q	(United States) R Baxter	6	**6**	10
WC	**(United States) J Ross**	**7**	3	**12**
**(Chile) P Rebolledo**	**7**	**6**
(Spain) J Arrese	6	3
(Australia) J Frawley	5	**6**	3
12	**(West Germany) H Schwaier**	**7**	3	**6**
16	(Argentina) H de la Peña	4	**6**	4
**(Uruguay) D Pérez**	**6**	4	**6**
**(United States) J Brown**	**6**	**6**
(Argentina) R Argüello	1	0
(Argentina) A Ganzábal	3	6
**(France) T Tulasne**	**6**	**7**

Second round
7	**(Argentina) JL Clerc**	5	**6**	**6**
WC	(United States) J Ross	**7**	2	4
(Chile) P Rebolledo	2	5
12	**(West Germany) H Schwaier**	**6**	**7**
**(Uruguay) D Pérez**	4	**6**	**6**
(United States) J Brown	**6**	3	3
(France) T Tulasne	3	4
4	**(France) Y Noah**	**6**	**6**

Third round
7	(Argentina) JL Clerc	3	2
12	**(West Germany) H Schwaier**	**6**	**6**
(Uruguay) D Pérez	1	3
4	**(France) Y Noah**	**6**	**6**

Quarterfinals
12	(West Germany) H Schwaier	3	1
4	**(France) Y Noah**	**6**	**6**

==== Section 4 ====
First round
**(Czechoslovakia) J Navrátil**	**6**	**6**
(Haiti) R Agénor	4	4
(United States) M Purcell	1	5
**(United States) L Duncan**	**6**	**7**
Q	(Sweden) S Eriksson	**7**	4	3
13	**(United States) M Dickson**	6	**6**	**6**
9	**(Czechoslovakia) L Pimek**	4	**6**	**9**
(Spain) J López-Maeso	**6**	2	7
(United States) D Goldie	3	1
WC	**(Austria) T Muster**	**6**	**6**
WC	(Peru) J Yzaga	**6**	4	0
**(Spain) G Urpí**	1	**6**	**6**

Second round
6	(United States) A Krickstein	**6**	0	5
**(Czechoslovakia) J Navrátil**	3	**6**	**7**
**(United States) L Duncan**	**6**	**6**
13	(United States) M Dickson	2	1
9	**(Czechoslovakia) L Pimek**	**6**	**6**
WC	(Austria) T Muster	1	3
(Spain) G Urpí	4	**6**	4
2	**(Ecuador) A Gómez**	**6**	2	**6**

Third round
**(Czechoslovakia) J Navrátil**	**6**	**7**
(United States) L Duncan	2	5
9	(Czechoslovakia) L Pimek	**6**	5	4
2	**(Ecuador) A Gómez**	3	**7**	**6**

Quarterfinals
(Czechoslovakia) J Navrátil	2	3
2	**(Ecuador) A Gómez**	**6**	**6**
