= 1985 U.S. Clay Court Championships – Men's doubles =

Men's doubles
- 1985 U.S. Clay Court Championships

Final
- Champions: (United States) Ken Flach (United States) Robert Seguso
- Runners-up: (Czechoslovakia) Pavel Složil (Australia) Kim Warwick
- Score: 6–4, 6–4

Details
- Draw: 28
- Seeds: 8

Events
Singles	men	women
Doubles	men	women
- U.S. Clay Court Championships

Top-seeds Ken Flach and Robert Seguso won the title for the second successive year, beating second-seeded pair Pavel Složil and Kim Warwick in the final.

== Seeds ==
The top four seeds received a bye into the second round. A champion seed is indicated in bold text while text in italics indicates the round in which that seed was eliminated.

1. (United States) **Ken Flach / (United States) Robert Seguso (champions)**
2. (Chile) Pavel Složil / (Australia) Kim Warwick (final)
3. (United States) Gary Donnelly / (United States) Blaine Willenborg (second round)
4. (Czechoslovakia) Libor Pimek / (Socialist Federal Republic of Yugoslavia) Slobodan Živojinović (semifinals)
5. (Chile) Hans Gildemeister / (Australia) David Graham (first round)
6. (United States) Bud Cox / (United States) Mark Dickson (first round)
7. (Puerto Rico) Ernie Fernández / (United States) Erik Van't Hof (first round)
8. (New Zealand) Chris Lewis / (United States) Mel Purcell (first round)

== Draw ==
Key

- Q = Qualifier
- WC = Wild card
- LL = Lucky loser
- Alt = Alternate
- ITF = ITF entry
- PR = Protected ranking
- SR = Special ranking
- SE = Special exempt
- JE = Junior exempt
- JR = Junior Accelerator Programme entrant
- CO = College Accelerator Programme entrant
- NG = Next Gen Accelerator Program entrant
- w/o = Walkover
- r = Retired
- d = Defaulted

=== Finals ===
Semifinals
1	**(United States) Ken Flach** **(United States) Robert Seguso**	**7**	**6**
7	(Ecuador) Andrés Gómez (Ecuador) Ricardo Ycaza	6	2
4	(Czechoslovakia) Libor Pimek (Socialist Federal Republic of Yugoslavia) Slobodan Živojinović	3	**6**	1
2	**(Czechoslovakia) Pavel Složil** **(Australia) Kim Warwick**	**6**	1	**6**

Final
1	**(United States) Ken Flach** **(United States) Robert Seguso**	**6**	**6**
2	(Czechoslovakia) Pavel Složil (Australia) Kim Warwick	4	4

=== Top half ===
First round
(Nigeria) T Mmoh (Finland) L Palin	1	**6**	8
**(Czechoslovakia) J Navrátil** **(West Germany) W Popp**	**6**	3	**10**
**(United States) R Leach** **(United States) M Wooldridge**	**6**	3	**8**
(United States) Fred Perrin (United States) N Schellenger	4	**6**	6
**(Mexico) J Lozano** **(United States) T Witsken**	**6**	**6**
5	(Chile) H Gildemeister (Australia) D Graham	4	1
(United States) R Baxter (United States) J Ross	**7**	4	4
**(United States) T Delatte** **(United States) C Wittus**	5	**6**	**6**
(Peru) P Arraya (Czechoslovakia) S Birner	5	4
**(France) G Forget** **(Australia) J Frawley**	**7**	**6**
**(Ecuador) A Gómez** **(Ecuador) R Ycaza**	**6**	**6**
7	(Puerto Rico) E Fernández (United States) E Van't Hof	3	4

Second round
1	**(United States) K Flach** **(United States) R Seguso**	**6**	3	**6**
(Czechoslovakia) J Navrátil (West Germany) W Popp	3	**6**	3
(United States) R Leach (United States) M Wooldridge	4	2
**(Mexico) J Lozano** **(United States) T Witsken**	**6**	**6**
3	(United States) G Donnelly (United States) B Willenborg	**6**	3	1
**(United States) T Delatte** **(United States) C Wittus**	3	**6**	**6**
(France) G Forget (Australia) J Frawley	5	4
**(Ecuador) A Gómez** **(Ecuador) R Ycaza**	**7**	**6**

Quarterfinals
1	**(United States) K Flach** **(United States) R Seguso**	**7**	**6**
(Mexico) J Lozano (United States) T Witsken	6	3
(United States) T Delatte (United States) C Wittus	4	2
**(Ecuador) A Gómez** **(Ecuador) R Ycaza**	**6**	**6**

Semifinals
1	**(United States) K Flach** **(United States) R Seguso**	**7**	**6**
(Ecuador) A Gómez (Ecuador) R Ycaza	6	2

=== Bottom half ===
First round
6	(United States) B Cox (United States) M Dickson	**7**	3	4
**(Argentina) M Jaite** **(Uruguay) D Pérez**	5	**6**	**6**
**(Australia) CA Miller** **(Australia) L Warder**	**7**	**7**
(United States) B Page (United States) Doug Pielet	5	5
(Spain) J Aguilera (Argentina) E Bengoechea	4	2
**(United States) D Goldie** **(Czechoslovakia) I Lendl**	**6**	**6**
8	(New Zealand) C Lewis (United States) M Purcell	3	**6**	4
WC	**(France) Y Noah** **(Argentina) G Vilas**	**6**	3	**6**
(Czechoslovakia) M Mečíř (Peru) J Yzaga	5	**6**	2
WC	**(Sweden) S Eriksson** **(Sweden) M Pernfors**	**7**	4	**6**
**(West Germany) K Richter** **(United States) J Turpin**	**6**	**7**
(Spain) J Arrese (Spain) G Urpí	1	6

Second round
(Argentina) M Jaite (Uruguay) D Pérez	4	1
**(Australia) CA Miller** **(Australia) L Warder**	**6**	**6**
(United States) D Goldie (Czechoslovakia) I Lendl	3	6
4	**(Czechoslovakia) L Pimek** **(Socialist Federal Republic of Yugoslavia) S Živojinović**	**6**	**7**
WC	(France) Y Noah (Argentina) G Vilas
WC	**(Sweden) S Eriksson** **(Sweden) M Pernfors**	w/o
(West Germany) K Richter (United States) J Turpin	4	0
2	**(Czechoslovakia) P Složil** **(Australia) K Warwick**	**6**	**6**

Quarterfinals
(Australia) CA Miller (Australia) L Warder	3	**6**	3
4	**(Czechoslovakia) L Pimek** **(Socialist Federal Republic of Yugoslavia) S Živojinović**	**6**	1	**6**
WC	(Sweden) S Eriksson (Sweden) M Pernfors	2	2
2	**(Czechoslovakia) P Složil** **(Australia) K Warwick**	**6**	**6**

Semifinals
4	(Czechoslovakia) L Pimek (Socialist Federal Republic of Yugoslavia) S Živojinović	3	**6**	1
2	**(Czechoslovakia) P Složil** **(Australia) K Warwick**	**6**	1	**6**
