= 1984 U.S. Clay Court Championships – Women's singles =

Women's singles
- 1984 U.S. Clay Court Championships

Final
- Champion: (Bulgaria) Manuela Maleeva
- Runner-up: (United States) Lisa Bonder-Kreiss
- Score: 6–4, 6–3

Details
- Draw: 56
- Seeds: 14

Events
| Singles | men | women |
| Doubles | men | women |
- U.S. Clay Court Championships

Fourth-seeded Andrea Temesvári was the defending champion but went out in the semifinals to Manuela Maleeva. Top-seed Maleeva won the final and $34,000 first prize money by defeating Lisa Bonder-Kreiss in the final.

== Seeds ==
The top eight seeds received a bye into the second round. A champion seed is indicated in bold text while text in italics indicates the round in which that seed was eliminated.

1. (Bulgaria) **Manuela Maleeva (champion)**
2. (United States) Zina Garrison (quarterfinals)
3. (United States) Lisa Bonder-Kreiss (final)
4. (Hungary) Andrea Temesvári (semifinals)
5. (Czechoslovakia) Helena Suková (second round)
6. (West Germany) Sylvia Hanika (third round)
7. (United States) Kathy Rinaldi (quarterfinals)
8. (United States) Pam Casale (semifinals)
9. (West Germany) Bettina Bunge (first round)
10. (United States) Camille Benjamin (first round)
11. (United States) JoAnne Russell (second round)
12. (Czechoslovakia) Iva Budařová (second round)
13. (South Africa) Rene Uys (first round)
14. (United States) Terry Phelps (quarterfinals)

== Draw ==
Key

- Q = Qualifier
- WC = Wild card
- LL = Lucky loser
- Alt = Alternate
- ITF = ITF entry
- PR = Protected ranking
- SR = Special ranking
- SE = Special exempt
- JE = Junior exempt
- JR = Junior Accelerator Programme entrant
- CO = College Accelerator Programme entrant
- NG = Next Gen Accelerator Program entrant
- w/o = Walkover
- r = Retired
- d = Defaulted

=== Finals ===
Quarterfinals
1 | **(Bulgaria) Manuela Maleeva** | **6** | **6**
7 | (United States) Kathy Rinaldi | 2 | 2
4 | **(Hungary) Andrea Temesvári** | **6** | **7**
14 | (United States) Terry Phelps | 4 | 6
(United States) Michelle Torres | 2 | 5
3 | **(United States) Lisa Bonder-Kreiss** | **6** | **7**
8 | **(United States) Pam Casale** | **6** | **6**
2 | (United States) Zina Garrison | 4 | 2

Semifinals
1 | **(Bulgaria) Manuela Maleeva** | **6** | **6**
4 | (Hungary) Andrea Temesvári | 3 | 2
3 | **(United States) Lisa Bonder-Kreiss** | **7** | **7**
8 | (United States) Pam Casale | 5 | 6

Final
1 | **(Bulgaria) Manuela Maleeva** | **6** | **6**
3 | (United States) Lisa Bonder-Kreiss | 4 | 3

=== Top half ===
==== Section 1 ====
First round
LL | **(France) C Vanier** | **7** | **6**
(Italy) S Simmonds | 5 | 3
(United States) S Solomon | 2 | 1
**(United States) D Spence** | **6** | **6**
**(United States) E Burgin** | **6** | **6**
9 | (West Germany) B Bunge | 3 | 2
Q | **(United States) K Gompert** | **7** | **6**
(United States) R Reis | 6 | 3
(United States) L-A Thompson | 6 | 3
**(United States) L Spain** | **7** | **6**
(United States) D Rubin | 3 | 2
**(Argentina) A Villagrán** | **6** | **6**

Second round
1 | **(Bulgaria) M Maleeva** | **6** | **6**
LL | (France) C Vanier | 3 | 4
**(United States) D Spence** | **6** | **7**
(United States) E Burgin | 4 | 5
Q | **(United States) K Gompert** | **6** | 3 | **6**
(United States) L Spain | 1 | **6** | 3
(Argentina) A Villagrán | **7** | 1 | 4
7 | **(United States) K Rinaldi** | 5 | **6** | **6**

Third round
1 | **(Bulgaria) M Maleeva** | **6** | 2 | **6**
(United States) D Spence | 1 | **6** | 0
Q | (United States) K Gompert | 4 | **6** | 4
7 | **(United States) K Rinaldi** | **6** | 1 | **6**

Quarterfinals
1 | **(Bulgaria) M Maleeva** | **6** | **6**
7 | (United States) K Rinaldi | 2 | 2

==== Section 2 ====
First round
Q | **(United States) B Gerken** | **6** | **6**
(United States) B Bramblett | 0 | 3
(Japan) E Okagawa | 4 | 2
Q | **(United States) S Mascarin** | **6** | **6**
(United States) B Bowes | 3 | 4
12 | **(Czechoslovakia) I Budařová** | **6** | **6**
14 | **(United States) T Phelps** | **6** | **6**
(United States) L McNeil | 1 | 3
(United Kingdom) S Barker | 4 | 1
**(Switzerland) K Stampfli** | **6** | **6**
(United States) F Raschiatore | **6** | 1 | 3
**(United States) J Klitch** | 1 | **6** | **6**

Second round
4 | **(Hungary) A Temesvári** | **6** | **7**
Q | (United States) B Gerken | 1 | 6
Q | **(United States) S Mascarin** | **6** | **6**
12 | (Czechoslovakia) I Budařová | 3 | 2
14 | **(United States) T Phelps** | **6** | **6**
(Switzerland) K Stampfli | 0 | 2
**(United States) J Klitch** | **6** | 1 | **6**
5 | (Czechoslovakia) H Suková | 3 | **6** | 1

Third round
4 | **(Hungary) A Temesvári** | **6** | **6**
Q | (United States) S Mascarin | 2 | 3
14 | **(United States) T Phelps** | **7** | **7**
(United States) J Klitch | 5 | 6

Quarterfinals
4 | **(Hungary) A Temesvári** | **6** | **7**
14 | (United States) T Phelps | 4 | 6

=== Bottom half ===
==== Section 3 ====
First round
Q | (Czechoslovakia) K Skronská | 0 | **6** | 2
**(United States) A Ivan** | **6** | 2 | **6**
**(United States) M Torres** | 4 | **6** | **8**
(United States) G Purdy | **6** | 4 | 6
LL | **(Czechoslovakia) M Skuherská** | 2 | **6** | **6**
13 | (South Africa) R Uys | **6** | 2 | 1
10 | (United States) C Benjamin | 3 | **6** | 7
**(Argentina) G Sabatini** | **6** | 4 | **9**
**(United States) V Nelson** | **7** | **6**
Q | (United States) K Cummings | 6 | 1
(Peru) P Vásquez | 1 | 4
**(United Kingdom) A Croft** | **6** | **6**

Second round
6 | **(West Germany) S Hanika** | **6** | **6**
(United States) A Ivan | 3 | 2
**(United States) M Torres** | **6** | **6**
LL | (Czechoslovakia) M Skuherská | 1 | 3
**(Argentina) G Sabatini** | **6** | 2 | **8**
(United States) V Nelson | 2 | **6** | 6
(United Kingdom) A Croft | 1 | 2
3 | **(United States) L Bonder-Kreiss** | **6** | **6**

Third round
6 | (West Germany) S Hanika | 4 | 3
**(United States) M Torres** | **6** | **6**
(Argentina) G Sabatini | 1 | 4
3 | **(United States) L Bonder-Kreiss** | **6** | **6**

Quarterfinals
(United States) M Torres | 2 | 5
3 | **(United States) L Bonder-Kreiss** | **6** | **7**

==== Section 4 ====
First round
(United States) T Mochizuki | 6 | 3
**(Australia) P Whytcross** | **7** | **6**
(United States) P Smith | 1 | 3
**(Argentina) E Raponi-Longo** | **6** | **6**
(United States) J Golder | 1 | 5
11 | **(United States) J Russell** | **6** | **7**
(United States) M Schillig | 3 | 3
**(United States) A-M Fernandez** | **6** | **6**
(Australia) K Smith | 4 | 2
**(South Africa) Y Vermaak** | **6** | **6**
(United States) K Kinney | **6** | 6 | 5
**(United States) S Foltz** | 2 | **7** | **7**

Second round
8 | **(United States) P Casale** | **6** | **6**
(Australia) P Whytcross | 3 | 2
**(Argentina) E Raponi-Longo** | **6** | **6**
11 | (United States) J Russell | 3 | 3
(United States) A-M Fernandez | 3 | 2
**(South Africa) Y Vermaak** | **6** | **6**
(United States) S Foltz | 1 | 3
2 | **(United States) Z Garrison** | **6** | **6**

Third round
8 | **(United States) P Casale** | **6** | **6**
(Argentina) E Raponi-Longo | 4 | 1
(South Africa) Y Vermaak | 2 | **6** | 3
2 | **(United States) Z Garrison** | **6** | 2 | **6**

Quarterfinals
8 | **(United States) P Casale** | **6** | **6**
2 | (United States) Z Garrison | 4 | 2
