= 1986 U.S. Clay Court Championships – Women's doubles =

Historical tennis event

Women's doubles
- 1986 U.S. Clay Court Championships

Final
- Champions: (West Germany) Steffi Graf (Argentina) Gabriela Sabatini
- Runners-up: (United States) Gigi Fernández (United States) Robin White
- Score: 6–2, 6–0

Details
- Draw: 32
- Seeds: 8

Events
Singles	men	women
Doubles	men	women
← 1985 ·	U.S. Clay Court Championships

Fifth-seeded pair Steffi Graf and Gabriela Sabatini claimed the title by defeating Gigi Fernández and Robin White in the final.

== Seeds ==
A champion seed is indicated in bold text while text in italics indicates the round in which that seed was eliminated:

1. (United States) Kathy Jordan / (Australia) Elizabeth Smylie (quarterfinals)
2. (United States) Gigi Fernández / (United States) Robin White (final)
3. (United States) Lori McNeil / (France) Catherine Suire (semifinals)
4. (Bulgaria) Manuela Maleeva / (United States) Terry Phelps (second round)
5. (West Germany) **Steffi Graf / (Argentina) Gabriela Sabatini (champions)**
6. (United States) Mary-Lou Daniels / (United States) Paula Smith (second round)
7. (United States) JoAnne Russell / (United States) Anne Smith (quarterfinals)
8. (Italy) Sandra Cecchini / (Peru) Laura Arraya (semifinals)

== Draw ==
=== Key ===
- Q = Qualifier
- WC = Wild card
- LL = Lucky loser
- Alt = Alternate
- SE = Special exempt
- PR = Protected ranking
- ITF = ITF entry
- JE = Junior exempt
- w/o = Walkover
- r = Retired
- d = Defaulted
- SR = Special ranking

=== Finals ===
Semifinals
8	(Italy) S Cecchini (Peru) L Arraya	**6**	3	2
5	**(West Germany) S Graf** **(Argentina) G Sabatini**	4	**6**	**6**
3	(United States) L McNeil (France) C Suire	4	**6**	3
2	**(United States) G Fernández** **(United States) R White**	**6**	4	**6**

Final
5	**(West Germany) S Graf** **(Argentina) G Sabatini**	**6**	**6**
2	(United States) G Fernández (United States) R White	2	0

=== Top half ===
First round
1	**(United States) K Jordan** **(Australia) E Smylie**	4	**6**	**6**
(United States) P Barg (Czechoslovakia) R Maršíková	**6**	4	3
(United States) L Antonoplis (United States) A Henricksson	2	3
**(South Africa) E Reinach** **(United States) S Rimes**	**6**	**6**
(United States) L Allen (United States) K Copeland	6	**6**	4
**(United States) L Allen** **(United States) R Reis**	**7**	3	**6**
(France) S Amiach (United States) MJ Fernández	4	**6**	3
8	**(Italy) S Cecchini** **(Peru) L Arraya**	**6**	4	**6**
4	**(Bulgaria) M Maleeva** **(United States) T Phelps**	**6**	**6**
(United States) J Forman (United States) K Kinney	4	2
(United States) D Farrell (Australia) P Whytcross	3	1
**(Argentina) M Paz** **(Argentina) A Villagrán**	**6**	**6**
(United States) V Nelson-Dunbar (Peru) P Vásquez	**7**	3	1
**(United States) S Collins** **(South Africa) Y Vermaak**	6	**6**	**6**
(United States) H Crowe (United States) K Steinmetz	5	2
5	**(West Germany) S Graf** **(Argentina) G Sabatini**	**7**	**6**

Second round
1	**(United States) K Jordan** **(Australia) E Smylie**	**6**	**6**
(South Africa) E Reinach (United States) S Rimes	2	4
(United States) L Allen (United States) R Reis	**6**	6	2
8	**(Italy) S Cecchini** **(Peru) L Arraya**	1	**7**	**6**
4	(Bulgaria) M Maleeva (United States) T Phelps	5	4
**(Argentina) M Paz** **(Argentina) A Villagrán**	**7**	**6**
(United States) S Collins (South Africa) Y Vermaak	5	2
5	**(West Germany) S Graf** **(Argentina) G Sabatini**	**7**	**6**

Quarterfinals
1	(United States) K Jordan (Australia) E Smylie	**6**	2	2
8	**(Italy) S Cecchini** **(Peru) L Arraya**	4	**6**	**6**
(Argentina) M Paz (Argentina) A Villagrán	1	4
5	**(West Germany) S Graf** **(Argentina) G Sabatini**	**6**	**6**

Semifinals
8	(Italy) S Cecchini (Peru) L Arraya	**6**	3	2
5	**(West Germany) S Graf** **(Argentina) G Sabatini**	4	**6**	**6**

=== Bottom half ===
First round
7	**(United States) J Russell** **(United States) A Smith**	**6**	**6**
(West Germany) G Dinu (United States) C Fernandez	2	0
**(United States) M Gurney** **(United States) M Torres**	**7**	4	**6**
(United States) J Kaplan (United States) T Mochizuki	6	**6**	3
(United States) C Copeland (United States) H Manset	**6**	1	2
**(United States) C Benjamin** **(United States) K McDaniel**	4	**6**	**6**
(United States) L Bernstein (United States) D Spence	3	2
3	**(United States) L McNeil** **(France) C Suire**	**6**	**6**
6	**(United States) M-L Daniels** **(United States) P Smith**	4	**6**	**6**
(United States) S Foltz (United States) N Sodupe	**6**	3	3
(United States) K Gompert (United States) G Kim	3	3
**(United States) P Casale** **(United States) B Gerken**	**6**	**6**
(Italy) L Garrone (Canada) H Kelesi	6	**7**	0
**(United States) C MacGregor** **(United States) C MacGregor**	**7**	6	**6**
(South Africa) J Mundel (United States) M Van Nostrand	3	4
2	**(United States) G Fernández** **(United States) R White**	**6**	**6**

Second round
7	**(United States) J Russell** **(United States) A Smith**	**6**	**6**
(United States) M Gurney (United States) M Torres	3	2
(United States) C Benjamin (United States) K McDaniel	**7**	6	3
3	**(United States) L McNeil** **(France) C Suire**	6	**7**	**6**
6	(United States) M-L Daniels (United States) P Smith	**6**	0	2
**(United States) P Casale** **(United States) B Gerken**	1	**6**	**6**
(United States) C MacGregor (United States) C MacGregor	4	4
2	**(United States) G Fernández** **(United States) R White**	**6**	**6**

Quarterfinals
7	(United States) J Russell (United States) A Smith	2	2
3	**(United States) L McNeil** **(France) C Suire**	**6**	**6**
(United States) P Casale (United States) B Gerken	5	6
2	**(United States) G Fernández** **(United States) R White**	**7**	**7**

Semifinals
3	(United States) L McNeil (France) C Suire	4	**6**	3
2	**(United States) G Fernández** **(United States) R White**	**6**	4	**6**
