= 1990 Puerto Rico Open – Singles =

Singles
- 1990 Puerto Rico Open

Final
- Champion: (United States) Jennifer Capriati
- Runner-up: (United States) Zina Garrison
- Score: 5–7, 6–4, 6–2

Details
- Draw: 32 (4Q/1LL)
- Seeds: 8

Events
Singles	Doubles
← 1989 ·	Puerto Rico Open	· 1991 →

Laura Gildemeister was the defending champion, but did not compete this year.

Jennifer Capriati won the title by defeating Zina Garrison 5–7, 6–4, 6–2 in the final.

== Seeds ==
1. (United States) Zina Garrison (final)
2. (United States) Jennifer Capriati (champion)
3. (United States) Amy Frazier (first round)
4. (Canada) Helen Kelesi (second round)
5. (Italy) Raffaella Reggi (second round)
6. (United States) Gigi Fernández (semifinals)
7. (United States) Lori McNeil (second round)
8. (United States) Ann Grossman (quarterfinals)

== Draw ==
=== Key ===
- Q = Qualifier
- WC = Wild card
- LL = Lucky loser
- Alt = Alternate
- SE = Special exempt
- PR = Protected ranking
- ITF = ITF entry
- JE = Junior exempt
- w/o = Walkover
- r = Retired
- d = Defaulted
- SR = Special ranking

=== Finals ===
Semifinals
1	(United States) Zina Garrison	6	6
(United States) Carrie Cunningham	4	4
6	(United States) Gigi Fernández	2	1
2	(United States) Jennifer Capriati	6	6

Final
1	(United States) Zina Garrison	7	4	2
2	(United States) Jennifer Capriati	5	6	6

=== Top half ===
First round
1	(United States) Z Garrison	6	7
(Bulgaria) E Pampoulova	3	5
Q	(United Kingdom) S Smith	4	6	7
(Italy) L Ferrando	6	3	5
LL	(Brazil) L Corsato	3	3
Q	(Soviet Union) E Brioukhovets	6	6
(United States) W White-Prausa	4	5
8	(United States) A Grossman	6	7
3	(United States) A Frazier	6	1	4
Q	(South Africa) E Reinach	2	6	6
(United States) C Cunningham	5
(Hong Kong) P Hy	1^{r}
(Argentina) F Labat	6	6
(Austria) B Reinstadler	4	3
(United States) L Harvey Wild	5	2
5	(Italy) R Reggi	7	6

Second round
1	(United States) Z Garrison	7	6
Q	(United Kingdom) S Smith	5	1
Q	(Soviet Union) E Brioukhovets	1	6	6^{5}
8	(United States) A Grossman	6	4	7^{7}
Q	(South Africa) E Reinach	6	5	1
(United States) C Cunningham	2	7	6
(Argentina) F Labat	6	4	7^{7}
5	(Italy) R Reggi	4	6	6^{4}

Quarterfinals
1	(United States) Z Garrison	7^{7}	3	6
8	(United States) A Grossman	6^{4}	6	1
(United States) C Cunningham	6	6
(Argentina) F Labat	2	3

Semifinals
1	(United States) Z Garrison	6	6
(United States) C Cunningham	4	4

=== Bottom half ===
First round
6	(United States) G Fernández	7^{7}	6
(United States) B Bowes	6^{3}	3
(Australia) N Provis	6	6
(Argentina) B Fulco	2	1
(South Africa) A Coetzer	2	2
(United States) A Keller	6	6
(United States) C Benjamin	2	2
4	(Canada) H Kelesi	6	6
7	(United States) L McNeil	6	6
(Argentina) F Haumüller	3	2
Q	(Sweden) M Strandlund	6	6
(United States) Ca MacGregor	3	3
(United States) M McGrath	7	6
(Soviet Union) N Medvedeva	5	4
(Czechoslovakia) A Strnadová	0	6^{3}
2	(United States) J Capriati	6	7^{7}

Second round
6	(United States) G Fernández	6	7^{8}
(Australia) N Provis	4	6^{6}
(United States) A Keller	6	2	6
4	(Canada) H Kelesi	3	6	4
7	(United States) L McNeil	5	7^{7}	1
Q	(Sweden) M Strandlund	7	6^{3}	6
(United States) M McGrath	3	2
2	(United States) J Capriati	6	6

Quarterfinals
6	(United States) G Fernández	6	4	6
(United States) A Keller	1	6	4
Q	(Sweden) M Strandlund	1	4
2	(United States) J Capriati	6	6

Semifinals
6	(United States) G Fernández	2	1
2	(United States) J Capriati	6	6
