= 1989 Puerto Rico Open – Doubles =

Doubles
- 1989 Puerto Rico Open

Final
- Champions: None
- Runners-up: (United States) Cammy MacGregor/ (United States) Ronni Reis, and (United States) Gigi Fernández / (United States) Robin White
- Score: final rained out

Details
- Draw: 16 (1WC/1Q)
- Seeds: 4

Events
Singles	Doubles
- Puerto Rico Open

Patty Fendick and Jill Hetherington were the defending champions, but none competed this year.

The final between Cammy MacGregor and Ronni Reis against Gigi Fernández and Robin White was cancelled due to rain. Therefore, no champions were declared.

== Seeds ==
1. (United States) Gigi Fernández / (United States) Robin White (final, match cancelled)
2. (United States) Sandy Collins / (Peru) Laura Gildemeister (semifinals)
3. (United States) Cammy MacGregor / (United States) Ronni Reis (final, match cancelled)
4. (France) Sophie Amiach / (United States) Camille Benjamin (semifinals)

== Draw ==
Key

- Q = Qualifier
- WC = Wild card
- LL = Lucky loser
- Alt = Alternate
- ITF = ITF entry
- PR = Protected ranking
- SR = Special ranking
- SE = Special exempt
- JE = Junior exempt
- JR = Junior Accelerator Programme entrant
- CO = College Accelerator Programme entrant
- NG = Next Gen Accelerator Program entrant
- w/o = Walkover
- r = Retired
- d = Defaulted

=== Draw ===
First round
1	(United States) G Fernández (United States) R White	6	6
(Argentina) F Haumüller (Japan) Y Koizumi	2	2
(United States) B Bowes (United States) M Werdel	3	3
(Denmark) S Albinus (France) N van Lottum	6	6
4	(France) S Amiach (United States) C Benjamin	6	7
(United States) K Foxworth (United States) T Whittington	3	5
(United States) D Faber (United States) L Spadea	6^{5}	7	6
(United States) M Norwood (Argentina) A Villagrán	7^{7}	5	2
(Canada) R Simpson (United States) N Sodupe	7^{7}	2	6
(Australia) M Jaggard (Canada) H Kelesi	6^{3}	6	3
Q	(United States) K Gompert (United States) E Rossides	1	2
3	(United States) C MacGregor (United States) R Reis	6	6
(Poland) R Baranski (Netherlands) I Driehuis	2	6	6
(Netherlands) H ter Riet (Peru) P Vásquez	6	3	1
WC	(Puerto Rico) Maribel Amadeo (United States) A Schwartz	1	2
2	(United States) S Collins (Peru) L Gildemeister	6	6

Quarterfinals
1	(United States) G Fernández (United States) R White	6	6
(Denmark) S Albinus (France) N van Lottum	2	0
4	(France) S Amiach (United States) C Benjamin	3	6	6
(United States) D Faber (United States) L Spadea	6	4	3
(Canada) R Simpson (United States) N Sodupe	2	2
3	(United States) C MacGregor (United States) R Reis	6	6
(Poland) R Baranski (Netherlands) I Driehuis	5	2
2	(United States) S Collins (Peru) L Gildemeister	7	6

Semifinals
1	(United States) G Fernández (United States) R White	6	6
4	(France) S Amiach (United States) C Benjamin	4	2
3	(United States) C MacGregor (United States) R Reis	6	7^{7}
2	(United States) S Collins (Peru) L Gildemeister	4	6^{3}

Final
1	(United States) G Fernández (United States) R White
3	(United States) C MacGregor (United States) R Reis	s
