= 1984 U.S. Clay Court Championships =

- Date: August 4–12
- Edition: 16th
- Draw: 56S / 28D (men); 56S / 32D (women)
- Prize money: $300,000 (men) $274,000 (women)
- Surface: Clay / outdoor
- Location: Indianapolis, Indiana, US

Champions

Men's singles
- (Ecuador) Andrés Gómez

Women's singles
- (Bulgaria) Manuela Maleeva

Men's doubles
- (United States) Ken Flach / (United States) Robert Seguso

Women's doubles
- (South Africa) Beverly Mould / (United States) Paula Smith
← 1983 ·	U.S. Clay Court Championships	· 1985 →

The 1984 U.S. Clay Court Championships (also known as the 1984 U.S. Open Clay Courts) was a men's Grand Prix and a women's Championship Series tennis tournament played on outdoor clay courts in Indianapolis in the United States. It was the 16th edition of the tournament and was held from August 4 through August 12, 1984. Andrés Gómez and Manuela Maleeva won the singles titles.

== Finals ==
=== Men's singles ===
(Ecuador) Andrés Gómez defeated (Hungary) Balázs Taróczy 6–0, 7–6

- It was Gómez' 4th title of the year and the 8th of his career.

=== Women's singles ===
(Bulgaria) Manuela Maleeva defeated (United States) Lisa Bonder-Kreiss 6–4, 6–3

- It was Maleeva's 3rd title of the year and of her career.

=== Men's doubles ===
(United States) Ken Flach / (United States) Robert Seguso defeated (Switzerland) Heinz Gunthardt / (Hungary) Balázs Taróczy 7–6, 7–5

- It was Flach's 3rd title of the year and of his career. It was Seguso's 3rd title of the year and of his career.

=== Women's doubles ===
(South Africa) Beverly Mould / (United States) Paula Smith defeated (United States) Elise Burgin / (United States) JoAnne Russell 6–2, 7–5

- It was Mould's 2nd title of the year and the 4th of her career. It was Smith's 2nd title of the year and the 8th of her career.
