= 1988 Honda Classic – Singles =

Singles
- 1988 Honda Classic
- 1987 Champion: (United States) Stephanie Rehe

Final
- Champion: (Australia) Anne Minter
- Runner-up: (Argentina) Mercedes Paz
- Score: 2–6, 6–4, 6–3

Details
- Draw: 32
- Seeds: 8

Events
Singles	Doubles
- Honda Classic

Stephanie Rehe was the defending champion but lost in the quarterfinals to Gigi Fernández.

Anne Minter won in the final 2–6, 6–4, 6–3 against Mercedes Paz.

== Seeds ==
A champion seed is indicated in bold text while text in italics indicates the round in which that seed was eliminated.

1. (United States) Stephanie Rehe (quarterfinals)
2. (United States) Patty Fendick (first round)
3. (Argentina) Bettina Fulco (second round)
4. (Australia) **Anne Minter (champion)**
5. (Brazil) Neige Dias (semifinals)
6. (United States) Gretchen Magers (quarterfinals)
7. (Argentina) Mercedes Paz (final)
8. (United States) Gigi Fernández (semifinals)

== Draw ==
Key

- Q = Qualifier
- WC = Wild card
- LL = Lucky loser
- Alt = Alternate
- ITF = ITF entry
- PR = Protected ranking
- SR = Special ranking
- SE = Special exempt
- JE = Junior exempt
- JR = Junior Accelerator Programme entrant
- CO = College Accelerator Programme entrant
- NG = Next Gen Accelerator Program entrant
- w/o = Walkover
- r = Retired
- d = Defaulted

First round
1	(United States) **S Rehe**	**6**	**6**
Q	(Peru) P Vásquez	4	4
(United States) M Gurney	2	3
(United States) **K Keil**	**6**	**6**
(Netherlands) M Bollegraf	1	0
(United States) **E Hakami**	**6**	**6**
Q	(United States) A Schwartz	**6**	3	6
8	(United States) **G Fernández**	4	**6**	**7**
4	(Australia) **A Minter**	4	**6**	**6**
(United States) B Bowes	**6**	3	4
Q	(Australia) L O'Neill	2	2
(Australia) **J Byrne**	**6**	**6**
(United States) **B Herr**	5	**6**	**6**
(Soviet Union) N Bykova	**7**	1	1
(United States) N Sodupe	5	6
6	(United States) **G Magers**	**7**	**7**
5	(Brazil) **N Dias**	**7**	**6**
(Italy) L Golarsa	6	4
(Canada) **J Hetherington**	1	**6**	**6**
(Mexico) A Gavaldón	**6**	2	4
(Australia) **M Jaggard**	**6**	2	**6**
Q	(United States) L-A Eldredge	1	**6**	4
(Argentina) A Villagrán	4	**6**	3
3	(Argentina) **B Fulco**	**6**	2	**6**
7	(Argentina) **M Paz**	4	**6**	**6**
(United States) M Van Nostrand	**6**	4	1
(Puerto Rico) E Viqueira	1	3
(United States) **A Ivan**	**6**	**6**
(United States) **K Steinmetz**	**6**	**6**
(Soviet Union) S Parkhomenko	0	2
(United States) **C Benjamin**	**6**	**7**
2	(United States) P Fendick	4	6

Second round
1	(United States) **S Rehe**	**6**	**6**
(United States) K Keil	2	0
(United States) E Hakami	1	2
8	(United States) **G Fernández**	**6**	**6**
4	(Australia) **A Minter**	**7**	**6**
(Australia) J Byrne	6	3
(United States) B Herr	5	1
6	(United States) **G Magers**	**7**	**6**
5	(Brazil) **N Dias**	**7**	**6**
(Canada) J Hetherington	6	3
(Australia) **M Jaggard**	**7**	**6**
3	(Argentina) B Fulco	6	2
7	(Argentina) **M Paz**	**7**	**6**
(United States) A Ivan	5	4
(United States) K Steinmetz	4	6
(United States) **C Benjamin**	**6**	**7**

Quarterfinals
1	(United States) S Rehe	6	**7**	3
8	(United States) **G Fernández**	**7**	6	**6**
4	(Australia) **A Minter**	**6**	**6**
6	(United States) G Magers	4	2
5	(Brazil) **N Dias**	**6**	**6**
(Australia) M Jaggard	3	0
7	(Argentina) **M Paz**	**6**	**6**
(United States) C Benjamin	3	0

Semifinals
8	(United States) G Fernández	2	0	r
4	(Australia) **A Minter**	**6**	**2**
5	(Brazil) N Dias	2	**6**	4
7	(Argentina) **M Paz**	**6**	2	**6**

Final
4	(Australia) **Anne Minter**	2	**6**	**6**
7	(Argentina) Mercedes Paz	**6**	4	3
