= 1990 Puerto Rico Open =

- Date: October 22–28
- Edition: 5th
- Category: Tier IV
- Draw: 32S / 16D
- Prize money: $150,000
- Surface: Hard / outdoor
- Location: Dorado, Puerto Rico
- Venue: Hyatt Regency Cerromar Hotel

Champions

Singles
- (United States) Jennifer Capriati

Doubles
- (Soviet Union) Elena Brioukhovets / (Soviet Union) Natalia Medvedeva
← 1989 ·	Puerto Rico Open	· 1991 →

The 1990 Puerto Rico Open was a women's tennis tournament played on outdoor hard courts at the Hyatt Regency Cerromar Hotel in San Juan in Puerto Rico that was part of the Tier IV category of the 1990 WTA Tour. It was the fifth edition of the tournament and was held from October 22 through October 27, 1990. Second-seeded Jennifer Capriati won the singles title and earned $27,000 first-prize money.

== Finals ==
=== Singles ===
(United States) Jennifer Capriati defeated (United States) Zina Garrison 5–7, 6–4, 6–2

- It was Capriati's 1st singles title of her career.

=== Doubles ===
(Soviet Union) Elena Brioukhovets / (Soviet Union) Natalia Medvedeva defeated (United States) Amy Frazier / (New Zealand) Julie Richardson 6–4, 6–2
