= 1984 Ginny of San Diego =

- Date: September 17–23
- Edition: 6th
- Category: Ginny Circuit (1+)
- Draw: 32S / 16D
- Prize money: $50,000
- Surface: Hard (Laykold) / outdoor
- Location: San Diego, California U.S.
- Venue: Morley Field Sports Complex

Champions

Singles
- (United States) Debbie Spence

Doubles
- (United States) Betsy Nagelsen / (United States) Sharon Walsh
- Southern California Open

The 1984 Ginny of San Diego was a women's tennis tournament played on outdoor hard courts at Morley Field Sports Complex in San Diego, California, United States, that was part of the Ginny Circuit of the 1984 Virginia Slims World Championship Series. The tournament was held from September 17 through September 23, 1984.

== Finals ==
=== Singles ===
(United States) Debbie Spence defeated (United States) Betsy Nagelsen 6–3, 6–7, 6–4

- It was Spence's only career title.

=== Doubles ===
(United States) Betsy Nagelsen / (United States) Paula Smith defeated (United States) Terry Holladay / (Poland) Iwona Kuczyńska 6–2, 6–4

- It was Nagelsen's 2nd title of the year and the 13th of her career. It was Smith's 3rd title of the year and the 9th of her career.
