= 1986 U.S. Clay Court Championships – Men's doubles =

Men's doubles
- 1986 U.S. Clay Court Championships

Final
- Champions: (Chile) Hans Gildemeister (Ecuador) Andrés Gómez
- Runners-up: (Australia) John Fitzgerald (United States) Sherwood Stewart
- Score: 6–4, 6–3

Details
- Draw: 28
- Seeds: 8

Events
Singles	men	women
Doubles	men	women
- U.S. Men's Clay Court Championships

Ken Flach and Robert Seguso were the defending champions but lost in the second round to Eliot Teltscher and Christo van Rensburg. Second-seeded pair Hans Gildemeister and Andrés Gómez claimed the title by defeating John Alexander and Sherwood Stewart in the final.

== Seeds ==
The top four seeds received a bye into the second round. A champion seed is indicated in bold text while text in italics indicates the round in which that seed was eliminated.

1. (United States) Ken Flach / (United States) Robert Seguso (second round)
2. (Chile) **Hans Gildemeister / (Ecuador) Andrés Gómez (champions)**
3. (Australia) John Fitzgerald / (United States) Sherwood Stewart (final)
4. (Australia) Peter Doohan / (Australia) Paul McNamee (quarterfinals)
5. (United States) Brad Gilbert / (United States) Tim Wilkison (semifinals)
6. (Switzerland) Jakob Hlasek / (Czechoslovakia) Pavel Složil (first round)
7. Withdrew
8. (United States) Sammy Giammalva Jr. / (United States) Matt Mitchell (first round)

== Draw ==
Key

- Q = Qualifier
- WC = Wild card
- LL = Lucky loser
- Alt = Alternate
- ITF = ITF entry
- PR = Protected ranking
- SR = Special ranking
- SE = Special exempt
- JE = Junior exempt
- JR = Junior Accelerator Programme entrant
- CO = College Accelerator Programme entrant
- NG = Next Gen Accelerator Program entrant
- w/o = Walkover
- r = Retired
- d = Defaulted

=== Finals ===
Semifinals
(United States) Brett Dickinson (United States) Glenn Layendecker	4	3
3	**(Australia) John Fitzgerald** **(United States) Sherwood Stewart**	**6**	**6**
5	(United States) Brad Gilbert (United States) Tim Wilkison	4	5
2	**(Chile) Hans Gildemeister** **(Ecuador) Andrés Gómez**	**6**	**7**

Final
3	(Australia) John Fitzgerald (United States) Sherwood Stewart	4	3
2	**(Chile) Hans Gildemeister** **(Ecuador) Andrés Gómez**	**6**	**6**

=== Top half ===
First round
**(United States) E Teltscher** **(South Africa) C van Rensburg**	6	**6**	**6**
(United States) T Delatte (United States) M Freeman	**7**	4	4
**(United States) B Dickinson** **(United States) G Layendecker**	**7**	**6**
(United States) M Bauer (France) T Tulasne	6	3
**(Australia) C Fancutt** **(United States) D Tarr**	**6**	3	**7**
8	(United States) S Giammalva Jr. (United States) M Mitchell	2	**6**	5
**(Chile) R Acuña** **(Canada) G Michibata**	1	**6**	**6**
(Mexico) J Lozano (United States) T Witsken	**6**	4	1
(United States) T Moor (United States) E Van't Hof	3	3
**(Sweden) S Eriksson** **(Sweden) M Pernfors**	**6**	**6**
**(United States) D Cassidy** **(United States) M Purcell**	**6**	4	**6**
6	(Switzerland) J Hlasek (Czechoslovakia) P Složil	1	**6**	2

Second round
1	(United States) K Flach (United States) R Seguso	6	4
**(United States) E Teltscher** **(South Africa) C van Rensburg**	**7**	**6**
**(United States) B Dickinson** **(United States) G Layendecker**	**6**	6	**7**
(Australia) C Fancutt (United States) D Tarr	4	**7**	5
3	**(Australia) J Fitzgerald** **(United States) S Stewart**	**6**	**7**
(Chile) R Acuña (Canada) G Michibata	2	6
**(Sweden) S Eriksson** **(Sweden) M Pernfors**	**7**	**6**
(United States) D Cassidy (United States) M Purcell	6	1

Quarterfinals
(United States) E Teltscher (South Africa) C van Rensburg	3	6
**(United States) B Dickinson** **(United States) G Layendecker**	**6**	**7**
3	**(Australia) J Fitzgerald** **(United States) S Stewart**	6	**6**	**6**
(Sweden) S Eriksson (Sweden) M Pernfors	**7**	2	2

Semifinals
(United States) B Dickinson (United States) G Layendecker	4	3
3	**(Australia) J Fitzgerald** **(United States) S Stewart**	**6**	**6**

=== Bottom half ===
First round
5	**(United States) B Gilbert** **(United States) T Wilkison**	**7**	**6**
(Argentina) A Ganzábal (Italy) C Panatta	5	1
(United States) S Meister (United States) C Wittus	**6**	6	8
**(United States) D Dowlen** **(Nigeria) N Odizor**	2	**7**	**10**
(South Africa) C Steyn (South Africa) D Visser	2	4
**(United States) J Arias** **(United States) A Krickstein**	**6**	**6**
LL	(India) A Amritraj (United States) B Teacher	**7**	1	5
**(South Africa) E Edwards** **(Paraguay) F González**	6	**6**	**7**
**(South Africa) M Robertson** **(United States) T Warneke**	6	**7**	**10**
(New Zealand) K Evernden (Australia) D Graham	**7**	6	8
(United States) S Denton (Mexico) L Lavalle	**7**	6	4
**(United States) M Davis** **(United States) B Schultz**	6	**7**	**6**

Second round
5	**(United States) B Gilbert** **(United States) T Wilkison**	**6**	**6**
(United States) D Dowlen (Nigeria) N Odizor	2	3
(United States) J Arias (United States) A Krickstein	3	0
4	**(Australia) P Doohan** **(Australia) P McNamee**	**6**	**6**
**(South Africa) E Edwards** **(Paraguay) F González**	**6**	**6**
(South Africa) M Robertson (United States) T Warneke	2	3
(United States) M Davis (United States) B Schultz	5	**6**	4
2	**(Chile) H Gildemeister** **(Ecuador) A Gómez**	**7**	3	**6**

Quarterfinals
5	**(United States) B Gilbert** **(United States) T Wilkison**	**6**	**7**
4	(Australia) P Doohan (Australia) P McNamee	4	6
(South Africa) E Edwards (Paraguay) F González	4	4
2	**(Chile) H Gildemeister** **(Ecuador) A Gómez**	**6**	**6**

Semifinals
5	(United States) B Gilbert (United States) T Wilkison	4	5
2	**(Chile) H Gildemeister** **(Ecuador) A Gómez**	**6**	**7**
