= Andrea Noszály =

Hungarian tennis player

- Country (sports): Hungary
- Born: 7 January 1970 (age 55)
- Prize money: $43,546

Singles
- Career record: 116–84
- Career titles: 5 ITF
- Highest ranking: No. 208 (25 September 1989)

Doubles
- Career record: 79–94
- Career titles: 2 ITF
- Highest ranking: No. 202 (5 August 1996)

Andrea Noszály (born 7 January 1970) is a Hungarian former professional tennis player.

== Biography ==
Noszály, who grew up in Budapest, was raised in a sporting family. Her father Sandor Sr represented Hungary in high jump at the 1960 Rome Olympics and her younger brother Sándor Jr competed on the ATP Tour.

During her career she reached a best singles ranking of 208 in the world and appeared in a total of three Federation Cup ties for Hungary, across 1989 and 1990 (overall win/loss 3–2). This included a World Group second round fixture against reigning champions Czechoslovakia, in which she lost to Jana Novotná but won a dead rubber doubles.

== ITF Circuit finals ==
$50,000 tournaments
$25,000 tournaments
$10,000 tournaments

=== Singles: 7 (5–2) ===
Result	No.	Date	Tournament	Surface	Opponent	Score
Win	1.	11 September 1988	ITF Agliana, Italy	Clay	(Switzerland) Csilla Bartos-Cserepy	6–2, 6–3
Win	2.	17 October 1988	ITF Azores, Portugal	Hard	(Sweden) Helena Dahlström	6–1, 6–3
Win	3.	7 May 1989	ITF Bournemouth, United Kingdom	Clay	(Argentina) Federica Haumüller	6–3, 6–0
Loss	1.	14 May 1989	ITF Lee-on-the-Solent, United Kingdom	Clay	(Japan) Kimiko Date	4–6, 0–6
Win	4.	10 September 1989	ITF Agliana, Italy	Clay	(Italy) Rosalba Caporuscio	7–6, 6–3
Win	5.	13 September 1993	ITF Zadar, Croatia	Clay	(Hungary) Petra Mandula	6–3, 6–3
Loss	2.	26 November 1995	ITF Mallorca, Spain	Clay (i)	(Hungary) Kira Nagy	4–6, 3–6

=== Doubles: 12 (2–10) ===
Result	No.	Date	Tournament	Surface	Partner	Opponents	Score
Loss	1.	21 November 1988	ITF Pforzheim, West Germany	Carpet (i)	(West Germany) Anouschka Popp	(West Germany) Vera-Carina Elter (West Germany) Eva-Maria Schürhoff	4–6, 5–7
Loss	2.	9 April 1989	ITF Bari, Italy	Clay	(West Germany) Eva-Maria Schürhoff	(Austria) Marion Maruska (Bulgaria) Elena Pampoulova	w/o
Loss	3.	7 May 1989	ITF Bournemouth, United Kingdom	Clay	(United Kingdom) Caroline Billingham	(Sweden) Catarina Bernstein (Argentina) Federica Haumüller	0–6, 6–4, 2–6
Loss	4.	4 September 1989	ITF Agliana, Italy	Clay	(Czechoslovakia) Zuzana Witzová	(United States) Kylie Johnson (West Germany) Caroline Schneider	6–3, 1–6, 0–6
Loss	5.	22 April 1990	ITF Turin, Italy	Clay	(Italy) Federica Bonsignori	(Japan) Ei Iida (Indonesia) Suzanna Wibowo	5–7, 6–3, 4–6
Win	1.	20 September 1993	ITF Marseille, France	Clay	(Belgium) Daphne Van De Zande	(Madagascar) Dally Randriantefy (Madagascar) Natacha Randriantefy	6–0, 6–4
Loss	6.	29 Aug 1994	ITF Maribor, Slovenia	Clay	(Germany) Adriana Barna	(Poland) Katharzyna Teodorowicz (Czech Republic) Helena Vildová	5–7, 0–6
Loss	7.	11 September 1995	ITF Karlovy Vary, Czech Republic	Clay	(Czech Republic) Radka Pelikánová	(Slovakia) Simona Galiková (Czech Republic) Květa Peschke	3–6, 4–6
Win	2.	20 November 1995	ITF Mallorca, Spain	Clay	(Hungary) Kira Nagy	(Austria) Désirée Leupold (Portugal) Joana Pedroso	6–4, 7–6
Loss	8.	24 June 1996	ITF Maribor, Slovenia	Clay	(Hungary) Kira Nagy	(Romania) Alida Gallovits (Romania) Alice Pirsu	4–6, 5–7
Loss	9.	16 September 1996	ITF Bossonnens, Switzerland	Clay	(Germany) Fruzsina Siklosi	(Madagascar) Natacha Randriantefy (Switzerland) Aliénor Tricerri	4–6, 5–7
Loss	10.	7 October 1996	ITF Nicosia, Cyprus	Clay	(Hungary) Nóra Köves	(Czech Republic) Petra Kučová (Czech Republic) Blanka Kumbárová	5–7, 2–6

== See also ==
- List of Hungary Fed Cup team representatives
