= 1989 Puerto Rico Open =

Tennis tournament

- Date: October 23–29
- Edition: 4th
- Category: 2
- Draw: 32S / 16D
- Prize money: $100,000
- Surface: Hard / outdoor
- Location: Dorado, Puerto Rico
- Venue: Hyatt Regency Cerromar Hotel

Champions

Singles
- (Peru) Laura Gildemeister

Doubles
- Final rained out
| ← 1988 · | Puerto Rico Open | · 1990 → |

The 1989 Puerto Rico Open was a women's tennis tournament played on outdoor hard courts at the Hyatt Regency Cerromar Hotel in Dorado, Puerto Rico that was part of the Category 2 tier of the 1989 WTA Tour. It was the fourth edition of the tournament and was held from October 23 through October 29, 1989. Fourth-seeded Laura Gildemeister won the singles title and earned $17,000 first-prize money.

== Finals ==
=== Singles ===
(Peru) Laura Gildemeister defeated (United States) Gigi Fernández 6–1, 6–2

- It was Gildemeister's 2nd singles title of the year and the 4th, and last, of her career.

=== Doubles ===
(United States) Cammy MacGregor / (United States) Ronni Reis vs. (United States) Gigi Fernández / (United States) Robin White final rained out
