= 1984 U.S. Clay Court Championships – Women's doubles =

Women's doubles
- 1984 U.S. Clay Court Championships

Final
- Champions: (South Africa) Beverly Mould (United States) Paula Smith
- Runners-up: (United States) Elise Burgin (United States) JoAnne Russell
- Score: 6–2, 7–5

Details
- Draw: 32
- Seeds: 8

Events
Singles	men	women
Doubles	men	women
- U.S. Clay Court Championships

Third-seeded pair Beverly Mould and Paula Smith claimed the title by defeating second-seeds Elise Burgin and JoAnne Russell in the final.

== Seeds ==
A champion seed is indicated in bold text while text in italics indicates the round in which that seed was eliminated.

1. (United States) Sandy Collins / (Czechoslovakia) Helena Suková (semifinals)
2. (United States) Elise Burgin / (United States) JoAnne Russell (final)
3. (South Africa) **Beverly Mould / (United States) Paula Smith (champions)**
4. (United States) Camille Benjamin / (United States) Zina Garrison (semifinals)
5. (United States) Lori McNeil / (United States) Felicia Raschiatore (first round)
6. (Czechoslovakia) Iva Budařová / (Czechoslovakia) Marcela Skuherská (first round)
7. (United States) Michelle Torres / (South Africa) Yvonne Vermaak (first round)
8. (United States) Susan Mascarin / (United States) Kathy Rinaldi (first round)

== Draw ==
Key

- Q = Qualifier
- WC = Wild card
- LL = Lucky loser
- Alt = Alternate
- ITF = ITF entry
- PR = Protected ranking
- SR = Special ranking
- SE = Special exempt
- JE = Junior exempt
- JR = Junior Accelerator Programme entrant
- CO = College Accelerator Programme entrant
- NG = Next Gen Accelerator Program entrant
- w/o = Walkover
- r = Retired
- d = Defaulted

=== Finals ===
Semifinals
1	(United States) Sandy Collins (Czechoslovakia) Helena Suková	4	**6**	4
3	**(South Africa) Beverly Mould** **(United States) Paula Smith**	**6**	1	**6**
4	(United States) Camille Benjamin (United States) Zina Garrison	1	3
2	**(United States) Elise Burgin** **(United States) JoAnne Russell**	**6**	**6**

Final
3	**(South Africa) Beverly Mould** **(United States) Paula Smith**	**6**	**7**
2	(United States) Elise Burgin (United States) JoAnne Russell	2	5

=== Top half ===
First round
1	**(United States) S Collins** **(Czechoslovakia) H Suková**	**6**	**6**
(United States) M Schillig (Australia) P Whytcross	2	1
**(Czechoslovakia) K Skronská** **(United States) K Steinmetz**	3	**6**	**6**
(United States) J Goodling (United States) V Nelson	**6**	2	1
(United States) J Golder (United States) S Solomon	2	4
**(United States) H Crowe** **(United States) K Kinney**	**6**	**6**
**(United Kingdom) S Barker** **(United Kingdom) A Croft**	2	**6**	**6**
6	(Czechoslovakia) I Budařová (Czechoslovakia) M Skuherská	**6**	3	4
3	**(South Africa) B Mould** **(United States) P Smith**	**6**	**6**
(United States) J Forman (United States) S Rimes	1	1
**(Argentina) E Raponi-Longo** **(Bulgaria) M Maleeva**	**6**	**7**
(Australia) N Gregory (New Zealand) B Perry	3	5
(Australia) A Gulley (Switzerland) H Strachoňová	3	**7**	5
**(United States) J Klitch** **(France) C Vanier**	**6**	6	**7**
**(United States) P Barg** **(United States) T Phelps**	5	**6**	**6**
8	(United States) S Mascarin (United States) K Rinaldi	**7**	4	2

Second round
1	**(United States) S Collins** **(Czechoslovakia) H Suková**	**6**	**6**
(Czechoslovakia) K Skronská (United States) K Steinmetz	2	4
(United States) H Crowe (United States) K Kinney	2	5
**(United Kingdom) S Barker** **(United Kingdom) A Croft**	**6**	**7**
3	**(South Africa) B Mould** **(United States) P Smith**	**6**	**6**
(Argentina) E Raponi-Longo (Bulgaria) M Maleeva	2	4
(United States) J Klitch (France) C Vanier	**6**	3	4
**(United States) P Barg** **(United States) T Phelps**	1	**6**	**6**

Quarterfinals
1	**(United States) S Collins** **(Czechoslovakia) H Suková**	**6**	**6**
(United Kingdom) S Barker (United Kingdom) A Croft	2	4
3	**(South Africa) B Mould** **(United States) P Smith**	6	**6**	**6**
(United States) P Barg (United States) T Phelps	**7**	1	1

Semifinals
1	(United States) S Collins (Czechoslovakia) H Suková	4	**6**	4
3	**(South Africa) B Mould** **(United States) P Smith**	**6**	1	**6**

=== Bottom half ===
First round
5	(United States) L McNeil (United States) F Raschiatore	4	**6**	3
**(Canada) K Dewis** **(Canada) H Pelletier**	**6**	4	**6**
**(Japan) E Okagawa** **(United States) R Reis**	**6**	**6**
(United States) B Bramblett (Chile) G Ohaco	1	1
**(South Africa) R Uys** **(Chile) P Vásquez**	**6**	**6**
(United States) B Bowes (United States) P Casale	3	1
(Argentina) G Sabatini (Argentina) A Villagrán	**6**	2	5
4	**(United States) C Benjamin** **(United States) Z Garrison**	1	**6**	**7**
7	(United States) M Torres (South Africa) Y Vermaak	**6**	2	8
**(United States) S Foltz** **(United States) D Spence**	4	**6**	**10**
(United States) K Huebner (United States) D Rubin	**7**	0	3
**(United States) B Gerken** **(United States) G Purdy**	5	**6**	**6**
**(United States) A-M Fernandez** **(United States) L Spain**	**7**	**6**
(Czechoslovakia) Y Brzáková (United States) T Mochizuki	5	2
(United States) L Bernstein (Italy) S Simmonds	2	5
2	**(United States) E Burgin** **(United States) J Russell**	**6**	**7**

Second round
(Canada) K Dewis (Canada) H Pelletier	3	**6**	5
**(Japan) E Okagawa** **(United States) R Reis**	**6**	4	**7**
(South Africa) R Uys (Chile) P Vásquez	**6**	3	2
4	**(United States) C Benjamin** **(United States) Z Garrison**	2	**6**	**6**
(United States) S Foltz (United States) D Spence	3	5
**(United States) B Gerken** **(United States) G Purdy**	**6**	**7**
(United States) A-M Fernandez (United States) L Spain	2	4
2	**(United States) E Burgin** **(United States) J Russell**	**6**	**6**

Quarterfinals
(Japan) E Okagawa (United States) R Reis	5	**6**	0
4	**(United States) C Benjamin** **(United States) Z Garrison**	**7**	3	**6**
(United States) B Gerken (United States) G Purdy	4	5
2	**(United States) E Burgin** **(United States) J Russell**	**6**	**7**

Semifinals
4	(United States) C Benjamin (United States) Z Garrison	1	3
2	**(United States) E Burgin** **(United States) J Russell**	**6**	**6**
