= 1984 U.S. Clay Court Championships – Men's doubles =

Men's doubles
- 1984 U.S. Clay Court Championships

Final
- Champions: (United States) Ken Flach (United States) Robert Seguso
- Runners-up: (Switzerland) Heinz Günthardt (Hungary) Balázs Taróczy
- Score: 7–6^{(10–8)}, 7–5

Details
- Draw: 28
- Seeds: 8

Events
| Singles | men | women |
| Doubles | men | women |
- U.S. Clay Court Championships

Fifth-seeded pair Ken Flach and Robert Seguso won the title, sharing $18,000 prize money. The third seeds Heinz Günthardt and Balázs Taróczy lost the final after being penalized the twelfth game of the second set following a dispute with the umpire.

== Seeds ==
The top four seeds received a bye into the second round. A champion seed is indicated in bold text while text in italics indicates the round in which that seed was eliminated.

1. (Australia) Mark Edmondson / (United States) Sherwood Stewart (quarterfinals)
2. (Chile) Pavel Složil / (United States) Ferdi Taygan (second round)
3. (Switzerland) Heinz Günthardt / (Hungary) Balázs Taróczy (final)
4. (Brazil) Cássio Motta / (Czechoslovakia) Tomáš Šmíd (quarterfinals)
5. (United States) Ken Flach / (United States) Robert Seguso **(champions)**
6. (United States) Blaine Willenborg / (United States) Van Winitsky (second round)
7. (Australia) David Graham / (Australia) Laurie Warder (second round)
8. (Australia) Peter Doohan / (Australia) Michael Fancutt (semifinals)

== Draw ==
Key

- Q = Qualifier
- WC = Wild card
- LL = Lucky loser
- Alt = Alternate
- ITF = ITF entry
- PR = Protected ranking
- SR = Special ranking
- SE = Special exempt
- JE = Junior exempt
- JR = Junior Accelerator Programme entrant
- CO = College Accelerator Programme entrant
- NG = Next Gen Accelerator Program entrant
- w/o = Walkover
- r = Retired
- d = Defaulted

=== Finals ===
Semifinals
(Australia) Brad Drewett (Australia) Kim Warwick | **6** | 3 | 2
5 | **(United States) Ken Flach** **(United States) Robert Seguso** | 4 | **6** | **6**
3 | **(Switzerland) Heinz Günthardt** **(Hungary) Balázs Taróczy** | **6** | **6**
(New Zealand) Chris Lewis (United States) Mel Purcell | 4 | 3

Final
5 | **(United States) Ken Flach** **(United States) Robert Seguso** | **7** | **7**
3 | (Switzerland) Heinz Günthardt (Hungary) Balázs Taróczy | 6 | 5

=== Top half ===
First round
**(Sweden) J Nyström** **(Sweden) S Simonsson** | **6** | **6**
(Australia) B Dyke (Australia) CA Miller | 1 | 1
**(United States) M Flur** **(New Zealand) M Lewis** | 3 | **6** | **6**
(United States) M Dickson (United States) D Gitlin | **6** | 2 | 2
**(Australia) B Drewett** **(Australia) K Warwick** | **7** | **7**
8 | (Australia) P Doohan (Australia) M Fancutt | 5 | 6
**(United States) D Saltz** **(United States) C Strode** | **7** | **6**
(United States) B Nealon (Socialist Federal Republic of Yugoslavia) M Ostoja | 6 | 0
**(United States) E Fromm** **(Israel) S Glickstein** | 4 | **6** | **6**
(Peru) P Arraya (Hungary) Z Kuhárszky | **6** | 2 | 2
(United States) M Freeman (United States) T Wilkison | **6** | 1 | 0
5 | **(United States) K Flach** **(United States) R Seguso** | 4 | **6** | **6**

Second round
1 | **(Australia) M Edmondson** **(United States) S Stewart** | **7** | 3 | **6**
(Sweden) J Nyström (Sweden) S Simonsson | 6 | **6** | 0
(United States) M Flur (New Zealand) M Lewis | **6** | 2 | 2
**(Australia) B Drewett** **(Australia) K Warwick** | 3 | **6** | **6**
4 | **(Brazil) C Motta** **(Czechoslovakia) T Šmíd** | **6** | **6**
(United States) D Saltz (United States) C Strode | 3 | 3
(United States) E Fromm (Israel) S Glickstein | **7** | 4 | 4
5 | **(United States) K Flach** **(United States) R Seguso** | 6 | **6** | **6**

Quarterfinals
1 | (Australia) M Edmondson (United States) S Stewart | 1 | **6** | 6
**(Australia) B Drewett** **(Australia) K Warwick** | **6** | 3 | **8**
4 | (Brazil) C Motta (Czechoslovakia) T Šmíd | 3 | 1
5 | **(United States) K Flach** **(United States) R Seguso** | **6** | **6**

Semifinals
(Australia) B Drewett (Australia) K Warwick | **6** | 3 | 2
5 | **(United States) K Flach** **(United States) R Seguso** | 4 | **6** | **6**

=== Bottom half ===
First round
6 | **(United States) B Willenborg** **(United States) V Winitsky** | **6** | **7**
(Chile) H Gildemeister (Chile) B Prajoux | 2 | 6
**(United States) G Donnelly** **(Czechoslovakia) L Pimek** | 5 | **6** | **6**
(Chile) P Rebolledo (Chile) M Rodríguez | **7** | 3 | 1
**(United States) J Ross** **(United States) T Witsken** | 4 | **6** | **11**
(Chile) R Acuña (Brazil) C Kirmayr | **6** | 3 | 9
7 | **(Australia) D Graham** **(Australia) L Warder** | **6** | **6**
(United States) M Kures (United States) J Levine | 2 | 3
**(New Zealand) C Lewis** **(United States) M Purcell** | **6** | **6**
(United States) B Csipkay (Sweden) P Hjertquist | 3 | 2
**(South Africa) D Tarr** **(United States) E Van't Hof** | **6** | 3 | **8**
(United Kingdom) C Dowdeswell (Sweden) H Simonsson | 4 | **6** | 6

Second round
6 | (United States) B Willenborg (United States) V Winitsky | 6 | 2
**(United States) G Donnelly** **(Czechoslovakia) L Pimek** | **7** | **6**
(United States) J Ross (United States) T Witsken | 4 | 4
3 | **(Switzerland) H Günthardt** **(Hungary) B Taróczy** | **6** | **6**
7 | (Australia) D Graham (Australia) L Warder | **6** | 4 | 4
**(New Zealand) C Lewis** **(United States) M Purcell** | 0 | **6** | **6**
**(South Africa) D Tarr** **(United States) E Van't Hof** | **7** | 1 | **6**
2 | (Czechoslovakia) P Složil (United States) F Taygan | 6 | **6** | 4

Quarterfinals
(United States) G Donnelly (Czechoslovakia) L Pimek | 2 | **7** | 5
3 | **(Switzerland) H Günthardt** **(Hungary) B Taróczy** | **6** | 5 | **7**
**(New Zealand) C Lewis** **(United States) M Purcell** | **6** | **6**
(South Africa) D Tarr (United States) E Van't Hof | 2 | 3

Semifinals
3 | **(Switzerland) H Günthardt** **(Hungary) B Taróczy** | **6** | **6**
(New Zealand) C Lewis (United States) M Purcell | 4 | 3
