= 1986 U.S. Clay Court Championships – Men's singles =

Men's singles
- 1986 U.S. Clay Court Championships

Final
- Champion: (Ecuador) Andrés Gómez
- Runner-up: (France) Thierry Tulasne
- Score: 6–4, 7–6

Details
- Draw: 56
- Seeds: 16

Events
| Singles | men | women |
| Doubles | men | women |
- U.S. Clay Court Championships

Second-seeded Andrés Gómez defeated Thierry Tulasne in the final to claim his second U.S. Clay Courts title and $51,000 prize money.

== Seeds ==
The top eight seeds received a bye into the second round. A champion seed is indicated in bold text while text in italics indicates the round in which that seed was eliminated.

1. (France) Thierry Tulasne (final)
2. (Ecuador) **Andrés Gómez (champion)**
3. (United States) Jimmy Arias (semifinals)
4. (Argentina) Martín Jaite (semifinals)
5. (Sweden) Henrik Sundström (third round)
6. (Australia) Paul McNamee (third round)
7. (United States) Tim Wilkison (third round)
8. (Sweden) Mikael Pernfors (quarterfinals)
9. (Czechoslovakia) Milan Šrejber (first round)
10. (Argentina) Guillermo Vilas (third round)
11. (Switzerland) Jakob Hlasek (quarterfinals)
12. (United States) Aaron Krickstein (quarterfinals)
13. (United States) Robert Seguso (first round)
14. (United States) Jonathan Canter (first round)
15. (United States) Brian Teacher (third round)
16. (Canada) Glenn Michibata (first round)

== Draw ==
Key

- Q = Qualifier
- WC = Wild card
- LL = Lucky loser
- Alt = Alternate
- ITF = ITF entry
- PR = Protected ranking
- SR = Special ranking
- SE = Special exempt
- JE = Junior exempt
- JR = Junior Accelerator Programme entrant
- CO = College Accelerator Programme entrant
- NG = Next Gen Accelerator Program entrant
- w/o = Walkover
- r = Retired
- d = Defaulted

=== Finals ===
Quarterfinals
1 | **(France) Thierry Tulasne** | **6** | **6**
(Argentina) Eduardo Bengoechea | 0 | 4
3 | **(United States) Jimmy Arias** | **6** | 0 | **6**
12 | (United States) Aaron Krickstein | 4 | **6** | 4
11 | (Switzerland) Jakob Hlasek | 2 | 4
4 | **(Argentina) Martín Jaite** | **6** | **6**
8 | (Sweden) Mikael Pernfors | 3 | 5
2 | **(Ecuador) Andrés Gómez** | **6** | **7**

Semifinals
1 | **(France) Thierry Tulasne** | **7** | **6**
3 | (United States) Jimmy Arias | 6 | 0
4 | (Argentina) Martín Jaite | 2 | 3
2 | **(Ecuador) Andrés Gómez** | **6** | **6**

Final
1 | (France) Thierry Tulasne | 4 | 6
2 | **(Ecuador) Andrés Gómez** | **6** | **7**

=== Top half ===
==== Section 1 ====
First round
WC | **(United States) T Witsken** | **6** | **6**
(West Germany) M Westphal | 2 | 4
**(United States) J Brown** | **7** | 3 | **6**
(Argentina) H de la Peña | 5 | **6** | 4
(Mexico) F Maciel | 1 | 1
15 | **(United States) B Teacher** | **6** | **6**
9 | (Czechoslovakia) M Šrejber | 3 | **6** | 4
**(Argentina) R Argüello** | **6** | 4 | **6**
(Nigeria) N Odizor | **7** | 2 | 4
**(Argentina) E Bengoechea** | 5 | **6** | **6**
**(Peru) P Arraya** | 1 | **6** | **6**
WC | (United States) Bobby Blair | **6** | 1 | 2

Second round
1 | **(France) T Tulasne** | 2 | **6** | **6**
WC | (United States) T Witsken | **6** | 3 | 1
(Argentina) H de la Peña | 3 | 2
15 | **(United States) B Teacher** | **6** | **6**
(Argentina) R Argüello | 3 | 5
**(Argentina) E Bengoechea** | **6** | **7**
(Peru) P Arraya | 1 | 3
7 | **(United States) T Wilkison** | **6** | **6**

Third round
1 | **(France) T Tulasne** | **6** | **6**
15 | (United States) B Teacher | 0 | 2
**(Argentina) E Bengoechea** | **6** | **7**
7 | (United States) T Wilkison | 3 | 6

Quarterfinals
1 | **(France) T Tulasne** | **6** | **6**
(Argentina) E Bengoechea | 0 | 4

==== Section 2 ====
First round
**(Italy) F Cancellotti** | **7** | **6**
(Czechoslovakia) M Vajda | 6 | 3
(Italy) C Panatta | 4 | 4
**(West Germany) D Keretić** | **6** | **6**
**(West Germany) H Schwaier** | 4 | **7** | **6**
13 | (United States) R Seguso | **6** | 5 | 2
12 | **(United States) A Krickstein** | **6** | **6**
Q | (South Africa) C van Rensburg | 3 | 0
(United States) K Flach | 1 | 1
Q | **(United States) D Tarr** | **6** | **6**
Q | **(Chile) H Gildemeister** | 6 | **6** | **6**
Q | (United States) M Freeman | **7** | 2 | 2

Second round
3 | **(United States) J Arias** | **6** | **6**
(Italy) F Cancellotti | 0 | 1
(West Germany) D Keretić | 0 | 1
**(West Germany) H Schwaier** | **6** | **6**
12 | **(United States) A Krickstein** | **6** | **6**
Q | (United States) D Tarr | 0 | 3
Q | (Chile) H Gildemeister | **6** | 2 | 0
5 | **(Sweden) H Sundström** | 3 | **6** | **6**

Third round
3 | **(United States) J Arias** | **6** | **6**
(West Germany) H Schwaier | 4 | 3
12 | **(United States) A Krickstein** | **6** | **6**
5 | (Sweden) H Sundström | 4 | 3

Quarterfinals
3 | **(United States) J Arias** | **6** | 0 | **6**
12 | (United States) A Krickstein | 4 | **6** | 4

=== Bottom half ===
==== Section 3 ====
First round
**(Chile) R Acuña** | **7** | **6**
(Australia) P Doohan | 6 | 3
**(United States) M Davis** | **7** | **6**
(Czechoslovakia) P Složil | 5 | 1
(United States) T Moor | **7** | 3 | 3
11 | **(Switzerland) J Hlasek** | 6 | **6** | **6**
14 | (United States) J Canter | 2 | **6** | 4
WC | **(United States) M Purcell** | **6** | 4 | **6**
Q | (Australia) J Fitzgerald | **6** | 3 | 2
**(United States) G Layendecker** | 3 | **6** | **6**
WC | **(Sweden) S Eriksson** | **7** | **6**
Q | (Sweden) T Högstedt | 6 | 3

Second round
6 | **(Australia) P McNamee** | **6** | **6**
(Chile) R Acuña | 3 | 4
(United States) M Davis | 4 | 1
11 | **(Switzerland) J Hlasek** | **6** | **6**
WC | **(United States) M Purcell** | **6** | 4 | **6**
(United States) G Layendecker | 2 | **6** | 1
WC | (Sweden) S Eriksson | 4 | 3
4 | **(Argentina) M Jaite** | **6** | **6**

Third round
6 | (Australia) P McNamee | 6 | 6
11 | **(Switzerland) J Hlasek** | **7** | **7**
WC | (United States) M Purcell | 0 | 1
4 | **(Argentina) M Jaite** | **6** | **6**

Quarterfinals
11 | (Switzerland) J Hlasek | 2 | 4
4 | **(Argentina) M Jaite** | **6** | **6**

==== Section 4 ====
First round
(Mexico) L Lavalle | 4 | 4
**(Brazil) C Motta** | **6** | **6**
(United States) H Solomon | **6** | 3 | 4
Q | **(United States) D Cassidy** | 4 | **6** | **6**
(United States) E Teltscher | 5 | 3
10/WC | **(Argentina) G Vilas** | **7** | **6**
16 | (Canada) G Michibata | 5 | 2
**(South Africa) C Steyn** | **7** | **6**
(New Zealand) K Evernden | 4 | 4
**(United States) S Giammalva Jr.** | **6** | **6**
(Socialist Federal Republic of Yugoslavia) B Orešar | 0 | 0
**(Uruguay) D Pérez** | **6** | **6**

Second round
8 | **(Sweden) M Pernfors** | w/o
(Brazil) C Motta
Q | (United States) D Cassidy | **6** | 4 | 4
10/WC | **(Argentina) G Vilas** | 4 | **6** | **6**
**(South Africa) C Steyn** | **6** | **6**
(United States) S Giammalva Jr. | 3 | 4
(Uruguay) D Pérez | 2 | 2
2 | **(Ecuador) A Gómez** | **6** | **6**

Third round
8 | **(Sweden) M Pernfors** | 6 | **7** | **6**
10/WC | (Argentina) G Vilas | **7** | 6 | 4
(South Africa) C Steyn | 1 | 2
2 | **(Ecuador) A Gómez** | **6** | **6**

Quarterfinals
8 | (Sweden) M Pernfors | 3 | 5
2 | **(Ecuador) A Gómez** | **6** | **7**
