= 1984 U.S. Clay Court Championships – Men's singles =

Men's singles
- 1984 U.S. Clay Court Championships

Final
- Champion: (Ecuador) Andrés Gómez
- Runner-up: (Hungary) Balázs Taróczy
- Score: 6–0, 7–6^{(7–5)}

Details
- Draw: 56
- Seeds: 16

Events
Singles	men	women
Doubles	men	women
- U.S. Clay Court Championships

Top-seeded Andrés Gómez defeated Balázs Taróczy in the final to claim the title and $51,000 prize money.

== Seeds ==
The top eight seeds received a bye into the second round. A champion seed is indicated in bold text while text in italics indicates the round in which that seed was eliminated.

1. (Ecuador) Andrés Gómez **(champion)**
2. (Sweden) Henrik Sundström (second round)
3. (Czechoslovakia) Tomáš Šmíd (second round)
4. (United States) Aaron Krickstein (third round)
5. (Spain) Juan Aguilera (third round)
6. (Sweden) Joakim Nyström (third round)
7. (Spain) José Higueras (third round)
8. (Argentina) Guillermo Vilas (third round)
9. (United States) Mel Purcell (second round)
10. (Switzerland) Heinz Günthardt (semifinals)
11. (Uruguay) Diego Pérez (first round)
12. (Peru) Pablo Arraya (quarterfinals)
13. (United States) Brad Gilbert (second round)
14. (Italy) Francesco Cancellotti (second round)
15. (United States) Mark Dickson (third round)
16. (Czechoslovakia) Libor Pimek (semifinals)

== Draw ==
Key

- Q = Qualifier
- WC = Wild card
- LL = Lucky loser
- Alt = Alternate
- ITF = ITF entry
- PR = Protected ranking
- SR = Special ranking
- SE = Special exempt
- JE = Junior exempt
- JR = Junior Accelerator Programme entrant
- CO = College Accelerator Programme entrant
- NG = Next Gen Accelerator Program entrant
- w/o = Walkover
- r = Retired
- d = Defaulted

=== Finals ===
Quarterfinals
1	**(Ecuador) Andrés Gómez**	**6**	**7**
12	(Peru) Pablo Arraya	4	5
(France) Thierry Tulasne	**6**	4	3
10	**(Switzerland) Heinz Günthardt**	3	**6**	**6**
(Chile) Hans Gildemeister	3	6
16	**(Czechoslovakia) Libor Pimek**	**6**	**7**
**(Hungary) Balázs Taróczy**	**7**	**6**
Q	(Argentina) Martín Jaite	6	4

Semifinals
1	**(Ecuador) Andrés Gómez**	**7**	**7**
10	(Switzerland) Heinz Günthardt	6	6
16	(Czechoslovakia) Libor Pimek	3	**6**	1
**(Hungary) Balázs Taróczy**	**6**	3	**6**

Final
1	**(Ecuador) Andrés Gómez**	**6**	**7**
(Hungary) Balázs Taróczy	0	6

=== Top half ===
==== Section 1 ====
First round
(United States) T Wilkison	**6**	4	5
**(United States) B Willenborg**	3	**6**	**7**
(Australia) J Alexander	5	5
**(United States) J Brown**	**7**	**7**
(United States) R Seguso	**6**	4	2
15	**(United States) M Dickson**	3	**6**	**6**
12	**(Peru) P Arraya**	3	**6**	**6**
(Spain) F Luna	**6**	4	4
WC	**(United States) J Levine**	4	**6**	**6**
(Italy) C Panatta	**6**	2	1
**(Australia) M Edmondson**	**6**	**6**
(Argentina) R Argüello	4	1

Second round
1	**(Ecuador) A Gómez**	**7**	2	**6**
(United States) B Willenborg	5	**6**	3
(United States) J Brown	5	**6**	2
15	**(United States) M Dickson**	**7**	4	**6**
12	**(Peru) P Arraya**	**7**	**6**
WC	(United States) J Levine	6	4
(Australia) M Edmondson	5	**6**	2
5	**(Spain) J Aguilera**	**7**	2	**6**

Third round
1	**(Ecuador) A Gómez**	**7**	3	**6**
15	(United States) M Dickson	6	**6**	2
12	**(Peru) P Arraya**	**6**	**6**
5	(Spain) J Aguilera	4	4

Quarterfinals
1	**(Ecuador) A Gómez**	**6**	**7**
12	(Peru) P Arraya	4	5

==== Section 2 ====
First round
(Czechoslovakia) P Složil	4	6
Q	**(West Germany) H Schwaier**	**6**	**7**
**(France) T Tulasne**	**6**	**6**
WC	(United States) T Witsken	0	2
(Sweden) S Simonsson	3	**6**	0
14	**(Italy) F Cancellotti**	**6**	3	**6**
10	**(Switzerland) H Günthardt**	**7**	**7**
(South Africa) D Tarr	5	6
WC	**(United States) J Ross**	**6**	4	**7**
Q	(Socialist Federal Republic of Yugoslavia) S Živojinović	3	**6**	5
(Australia) B Drewett	3	5
**(Socialist Federal Republic of Yugoslavia) M Ostoja**	**6**	**7**

Second round
3	(Czechoslovakia) T Šmíd	3	**7**	0
Q	**(West Germany) H Schwaier**	**6**	6	**6**
**(France) T Tulasne**	4	**6**	**6**
14	(Italy) F Cancellotti	**6**	4	4
10	**(Switzerland) H Günthardt**	**6**	**7**
WC	(United States) J Ross	2	6
(Socialist Federal Republic of Yugoslavia) M Ostoja	3	**6**	1
6	**(Sweden) J Nyström**	**6**	3	**6**

Third round
Q	(West Germany) H Schwaier	6	1
**(France) T Tulasne**	**7**	**6**
10	**(Switzerland) H Günthardt**	**6**	2	**6**
6	(Sweden) J Nyström	2	**6**	1

Quarterfinals
(France) T Tulasne	**6**	4	3
10	**(Switzerland) H Günthardt**	3	**6**	**6**

=== Bottom half ===
==== Section 3 ====
First round
Q	**(Spain) A Tous**	**6**	**6**
(Australia) T Allan	4	4
**(Chile) H Gildemeister**	**6**	**7**
Q	(Brazil) M Hocevar	2	6
(United States) M Freeman	**6**	2	2
9	**(United States) M Purcell**	2	**6**	**6**
16	**(Czechoslovakia) L Pimek**	**6**	**6**
(Chile) P Rebolledo	0	1
(United States) V Winitsky	3	1
**(Hungary) Z Kuhárszky**	**6**	**6**
**(Chile) R Acuña**	3	**6**	4
(United States) J Lapidus	**6**	2	0^{r}

Second round
7	**(Spain) J Higueras**	**6**	6	**6**
Q	(Spain) A Tous	1	**7**	4
**(Chile) H Gildemeister**	**6**	**6**
9	(United States) M Purcell	2	2
16	**(Czechoslovakia) L Pimek**	**6**	**6**
(Hungary) Z Kuhárszky	3	3
(Chile) R Acuña	3	5
4	**(United States) A Krickstein**	**6**	**7**

Third round
7	(Spain) J Higueras	2	**6**	6
**(Chile) H Gildemeister**	**6**	3	**8**
16	**(Czechoslovakia) L Pimek**	3	**6**	**6**
4	(United States) A Krickstein	**6**	4	3

Quarterfinals
(Chile) H Gildemeister	3	6
16	**(Czechoslovakia) L Pimek**	**6**	**7**

==== Section 4 ====
First round
Q	(United States) B Nealon	**7**	2	3
**(Brazil) C Motta**	5	**6**	**6**
**(Hungary) B Taróczy**	6	**6**	**6**
WC	(Sweden) H Simonsson	**7**	3	3
**(Czechoslovakia) M Mečíř**	**6**	2	**7**
13	(United States) B Gilbert	1	**6**	5
11	(Uruguay) D Pérez	**6**	3	2
Q	**(Argentina) M Jaite**	1	**6**	**6**
**(New Zealand) C Lewis**	**7**	**6**
(Israel) S Glickstein	6	2
(United Kingdom) C Dowdeswell	5	2
Q	**(Argentina) A Ganzábal**	**7**	**6**

Second round
8	**(Argentina) G Vilas**	**6**	2	**6**
(Brazil) C Motta	2	**6**	4
**(Hungary) B Taróczy**	6	**6**	**6**
(Czechoslovakia) M Mečíř	**7**	1	1
Q	**(Argentina) M Jaite**	**6**	**6**
(New Zealand) C Lewis	2	4
Q	**(Argentina) A Ganzábal**	**6**	3	**6**
2	(Sweden) H Sundström	2	**6**	4

Third round
8	(Argentina) G Vilas	**6**	6	4
**(Hungary) B Taróczy**	3	**7**	**6**
Q	**(Argentina) M Jaite**	**6**	4
Q	(Argentina) A Ganzábal	3	1^{r}

Quarterfinals
**(Hungary) B Taróczy**	**7**	**6**
Q	(Argentina) M Jaite	6	4
