= 1985 U.S. Clay Court Championships =

- Date: July 21–29
- Edition: 17th
- Draw: 56S / 28D (men); 56S / 32D (women)
- Prize money: $300,000 (men) $275,000 (women)
- Surface: Clay / outdoor
- Location: Indianapolis, Indiana, U.S.
- Venue: Indianapolis Tennis Center

Champions

Men's singles
- (Czechoslovakia) Ivan Lendl

Women's singles
- (Hungary) Andrea Temesvári

Men's doubles
- (United States) Ken Flach / (United States) Robert Seguso

Women's doubles
- (Bulgaria) Katerina Maleeva / (Bulgaria) Manuela Maleeva
← 1984 ·	U.S. Clay Court Championships	· 1986 →

The 1985 U.S. Clay Court Championships was a men's Grand Prix and women's Championship Series tennis tournament held at the Indianapolis Tennis Center in Indianapolis in the United States and played on outdoor clay courts. It was the 17th edition of the tournament and was held from July 21 to July 29, 1985. Ivan Lendl and Andrea Temesvári won the singles titles.

== Finals ==
=== Men's singles ===
(Czechoslovakia) Ivan Lendl defeated (Ecuador) Andrés Gómez 6–1, 6–3

- It was Lendl's 5th title of the year and the 47th of his career.

=== Women's singles ===
(Hungary) Andrea Temesvári defeated (United States) Zina Garrison 7–6^{(7–0)}, 6–3

=== Men's doubles ===
(United States) Ken Flach / (United States) Robert Seguso defeated (Czechoslovakia) Pavel Složil / (Australia) Kim Warwick 6–4, 6–4

=== Women's doubles ===
(Bulgaria) Katerina Maleeva / (Bulgaria) Manuela Maleeva defeated (United States) Penny Barg / (United States) Paula Smith 2–6, 6–3, 6–4
