= 1986 U.S. Clay Court Championships =

- Date: April 27 – May 4
- Edition: 18th
- Draw: 56S / 28D (men); 56S / 32D (women)
- Prize money: $300,000 (men) $275,000 (women)
- Surface: Clay / outdoor
- Location: Indianapolis, Indiana, US

Champions

Men's singles
- (Ecuador) Andrés Gómez

Women's singles
- (West Germany) Steffi Graf

Men's doubles
- (Chile) Hans Gildemeister / (Ecuador) Andrés Gómez

Women's doubles
- (West Germany) Steffi Graf / (Argentina) Gabriela Sabatini
- U.S. Clay Court Championships

The 1986 U.S. Clay Court Championships (also known as the U.S. Open Clay Courts) was a men's Grand Prix and a women's Championship Series tennis tournament held in Indianapolis, Indiana in the United States. The tournament was the 18th edition as an open event and the last with a women's competition. Andrés Gómez and Steffi Graf won the singles titles and first–place prizes of $51,000 and $38,000 respectively.

The tournament was held in the spring (April 27–May 4) to coincide with the European clay court season but the weather was poor, attendances were down on those of previous years and none of the top–16 ranked male players competed.

== Finals ==
=== Men's singles ===
(Ecuador) Andrés Gómez defeated (France) Thierry Tulasne 6–4, 7–6^{(7–1)}

=== Women's singles ===
(West Germany) Steffi Graf defeated (Argentina) Gabriela Sabatini 2–6, 7–6^{(7–5)}, 6–4

=== Men's doubles ===
(Chile) Hans Gildemeister / (Ecuador) Andrés Gómez defeated (Australia) John Fitzgerald / (United States) Sherwood Stewart 6–4, 6–3

=== Women's doubles ===
(West Germany) Steffi Graf / (Argentina) Gabriela Sabatini defeated (United States) Gigi Fernández / (United States) Robin White 6–2, 6–0
