= Norm Schellenger =

American tennis player (born 1961)

- Full name: Norman Schellenger
- Country (sports): United States
- Born: January 12, 1961 (age 65) Miami, U.S.
- Height: 5 ft 11 in (180 cm)
- Prize money: $10,270

Singles
- Career record: 1–3
- Highest ranking: No. 254 (Dec 23, 1985)

Grand Slam singles results
- Wimbledon: Q1 (1987)

Doubles
- Career record: 0–2
- Highest ranking: No. 246 (Sep 30, 1985)

Norman Schellenger (born January 12, 1961) is an American former professional tennis player.

Born in Miami, Schellenger was a collegiate tennis player for Virginia Commonwealth University and competed on the professional tour in the 1980s, reaching a best singles world ranking of 254. He made the second round of the 1985 U.S. Clay Court Championships and featured in the qualifying draw for the 1987 Wimbledon Championships.

== ATP Challenger finals ==
=== Doubles: 1 (0–1) ===
Result	Date	Tournament	Surface	Partner	Opponents	Score
Loss	Jul 1985	Schenectady, United States	Hard	(United States) Fred Perrin	(United States) Andy Andrews (United States) Tomm Warneke	4–6, 6–7
