= 1988 Honda Classic – Doubles =

Doubles
- 1988 Honda Classic
- 1987 Champions: (South Africa) Lise Gregory (United States) Ronni Reis

Final
- Champions: (United States) Patty Fendick (Canada) Jill Hetherington
- Runners-up: (United States) Gigi Fernández (United States) Robin White
- Score: 6–4, 6–2

Details
- Draw: 16
- Seeds: 4

Events
Singles	Doubles
- Honda Classic

The 1988 Honda Classic doubles event was part of the 1988 Honda Classic women's tennis tournament which was part of Category 1 tier of the 1988 WTA Tour and held from October 10 through October 16, 1988 in San Juan in Puerto Rico . The draw consisted of 16 teams of which four were seeded. Lise Gregory and Ronni Reis were the defending champions, but neither competed this year. The second-seeded team of Patty Fendick and Jill Hetherington won the doubles title by defeating the top-seeded team of Gigi Fernández and Robin White in the final 6–4, 6–2.

== Seeds ==
Champion seeds are indicated in bold text while text in italics indicates the round in which those seeds were eliminated.

1. (United States) Gigi Fernández / (United States) Robin White (final)
2. (United States) **Patty Fendick** / (Canada) **Jill Hetherington (champions)**
3. (Australia) Jenny Byrne / (Australia) Janine Tremelling (quarterfinals)
4. (Netherlands) Manon Bollegraf / (Argentina) Mercedes Paz (quarterfinals)

== Draw ==
Key

- Q = Qualifier
- WC = Wild card
- LL = Lucky loser
- Alt = Alternate
- ITF = ITF entry
- PR = Protected ranking
- SR = Special ranking
- SE = Special exempt
- JE = Junior exempt
- JR = Junior Accelerator Programme entrant
- CO = College Accelerator Programme entrant
- NG = Next Gen Accelerator Program entrant
- w/o = Walkover
- r = Retired
- d = Defaulted

First round

Quarterfinals

Semifinals

Final

1
- (United States) **G Fernández**
- (United States) **R White**
**6**
**6**

- (Brazil) N Dias
- (Australia) M Jaggard
1
3

1
- (United States) **G Fernández**
- (United States) **R White**
**6**
**6**

- (Peru) P Vásquez
- (Puerto Rico) E Viqueira
2
1

- (United States) B Bowes
- (United States) E Hakami
3
1

- (United States) **B Bowes**
- (United States) **E Hakami**
**6**
**6**

1
- (United States) **G Fernández**
- (United States) **R White**
**6**
**7**

3
- (Australia) **J Byrne**
- (Australia) **J Tremelling**
**6**
**6**

- (United States) C Benjamin
- (United States) G Magers
1
6

- (Argentina) B Fulco
- (Argentina) A Villagrán
2
3

3
- (Australia) J Byrne
- (Australia) J Tremelling
3
3

- (United States) N Sodupe
- (Brazil) T Zambrzycki
6
5

- (United States) **C Benjamin**
- (United States) **G Magers**
**6**
**6**

- (United States) **C Benjamin**
- (United States) **G Magers**
**7**
**7**

1
- (United States) Gigi Fernández
- (United States) Robin White
4
2

- (Brazil) L Corsato
- (Brazil) A Vieira
3
4

2
- (United States) **Patty Fendick**
- (Canada) **Jill Hetherington**
**6**
**6**

- (Soviet Union) **N Bykova**
- (Soviet Union) **S Parkhomenko**
**6**
**6**

- (Soviet Union) **N Bykova**
- (Soviet Union) **S Parkhomenko**
3
**6**
**7**

- (United States) J Goodling
- (Australia) L O'Neill
**7**
1
1

4
- (Netherlands) M Bollegraf
- (Argentina) M Paz
**6**
3
6

4
- (Netherlands) **M Bollegraf**
- (Argentina) **M Paz**
5
**6**
**6**

- (Soviet Union) N Bykova
- (Soviet Union) S Parkhomenko
6
4

- (United States) B Herr
- (Australia) A Minter
6
3

2
- (United States) **P Fendick**
- (Canada) **J Hetherington**
**7**
**6**

- (Australia) **A Scott**
- (United States) **M Van Nostrand**
**7**
**6**

- (Australia) A Scott
- (United States) M Van Nostrand
3
1

- (United States) K Steinmetz
- (United States) W Wood
1
2

2
- (United States) **P Fendick**
- (Canada) **J Hetherington**
**6**
**6**

2
- (United States) **P Fendick**
- (Canada) **J Hetherington**
**6**
**6**
