= 1988 Honda Classic =

- Date: October 10–16
- Edition: 3rd
- Category: Category 1
- Draw: 32S / 16D
- Prize money: $75,000
- Surface: Hard / outdoor
- Location: San Juan, Puerto Rico
- Venue: San Juan Central Park

Champions

Singles
- (Australia) Anne Minter

Doubles
- (United States) Patty Fendick / (Canada) Jill Hetherington
- Puerto Rico Open

The 1988 Honda Classic was a women's tennis tournament played on outdoor hard courts at the San Juan Central Park in San Juan in Puerto Rico and was part of the Category 1 tier of the 1988 WTA Tour. It was the third edition of the tournament and was held from October 10 through October 16, 1988. Fourth-seeded Anne Minter won the singles title and earned $12,000 first-prize money.

== Finals ==
=== Singles ===
(Australia) Anne Minter defeated (Argentina) Mercedes Paz 2–6, 6–4, 6–3

- It was Minter's only singles title of the year and the 3rd of her career.

=== Doubles ===
(United States) Patty Fendick / (Canada) Jill Hetherington defeated (United States) Gigi Fernández / (United States) Robin White 6–4, 6–2

- It was Fendick's 8th title of the year and the 8th of her career. It was Hetherington's 6th title of the year and the 7th of her career.
