= Anna Ivan =

American tennis player

- Full name: Anna Yukiko Ivan Miller
- Country (sports): United States
- Born: January 17, 1966 (age 59)
- Prize money: $77,310

Singles
- Career record: 110–81
- Highest ranking: No. 39 (July 7, 1986)

Grand Slam singles results
- Australian Open: 1R (1989)
- French Open: Q2 (1989)
- Wimbledon: 1R (1990)
- US Open: 1R (1985)

Doubles
- Career record: 6–10
- Highest ranking: No. 504 (November 6, 1989)

Anna Yukiko Ivan Miller (born January 17, 1966) is an American former professional tennis player.

Ivan grew up in Palo Alto, California, and played varsity tennis for Stanford University from 1984 to 1985. She quit the team over tensions with her coach, soon after she had been suspended indefinitely over claims she wasn't adjusting to the team atmosphere.

On the professional tour, Ivan reached a career high ranking of 39 in the world. At the 1985 U.S. Clay Court Championships she scored an upset win over Kathy Horvath en route to the quarter-finals, where she was beaten in three sets by second seed Zina Garrison. She won her way through to the fourth round of the 1986 Lipton International Players Championships, which included a win against the fifth seeded Bonnie Gadusek.

For a period between 1986 and 1988 she had to sit out of professional tennis for two years due to a series of injuries, the most serious of which was a 20-foot fall she took from a roof while cleaning a gutter, only narrowly avoiding paralysis. Having landed on her head, she was rendered unconscious by the fall and broke several bones, in her wrists, feet and face.
