= Federica Haumüller =

Argentine tennis player

- Country (sports): Argentina
- Residence: Chañar Ladeado, Caseros Department, Argentina
- Born: 5 December 1972 (age 53) Chañar Ladeado, Caseros Department, Argentina
- Turned pro: 1987
- Retired: 1991
- Prize money: US$ 44,380

Singles
- Career record: 43–31
- Career titles: 1
- Highest ranking: No. 102 (25 June 1990)

Grand Slam singles results
- French Open: 1R (1990)
- US Open: 1R (1990)

Doubles
- Career record: 20–19
- Career titles: 0
- Highest ranking: No. 182 (5 February 1990)

Federica Haumüller (born 5 December 1972) is a former professional tennis player from Argentina who played from 1987 to 1991.

Haumüller won one WTA tournament.

== Career finals ==
=== Singles (1 title) ===
No.	Date	Tournament	Tier	Surface	Finalist	Score
1	11 December 1989	The Rainha Classic, Guaruja	Tier V	Hard (outdoors)	(Argentina) Patricia Tarabini	7–6^{(9–7)}, 6–4

== ITF finals ==
=== Singles (0–2) ===
Result	No.	Date	Tournament	Surface	Opponent	Score
Loss	1.	30 October 1988	Montevideo, Uruguay	Clay	(United States) Alix Creek	3–6, 6–3, 3–6
Loss	2.	7 May 1989	Bournemouth, United Kingdom	Clay	(Hungary) Andrea Noszály	3–6, 0–6

=== Doubles (3–0) ===
Result	No.	Date	Tournament	Surface	Partner	Opponents	Score
Win	1.	29 November 1987	Buenos Aires, Argentina	Clay	(Argentina) Florencia Labat	(Argentina) Silvia Correa (Argentina) María Eugenia Vago	7–6, 6–2
Win	2.	16 October 1988	Santiago, Chile	Clay	(Argentina) Florencia Labat	(Brazil) Rita Cruz Lima (Ecuador) Nuria Niemes	6–2, 4–6, 6–0
Win	3.	7 May 1989	Bournemouth, United Kingdom	Clay	(Sweden) Catarina Bernstein	(United Kingdom) Caroline Billingham (Hungary) Andrea Noszály	6–0, 4–6, 6–2

== Ranking history ==
Year end – singles:

1991: 336

1990: 132

1989: 207

1988: 380
