= Debbie Spence =

American tennis player

- Full name: Debbie Spence Nasim
- Country (sports): United States
- Born: August 7, 1967 (age 58)
- Prize money: $128,615

Singles
- Career record: 59–54
- Career titles: 1 WTA
- Highest ranking: No. 35 (January 6, 1986)

Grand Slam singles results
- French Open: 4R (1985)
- Wimbledon: 1R (1986, 1987)
- US Open: 2R (1984)

Doubles
- Career record: 3–10

Grand Slam doubles results
- French Open: 1R (1985)
- US Open: 1R (1984)

Debbie Spence Nasim (born August 9, 1967) is a former professional tennis player from the United States.

== Biography ==
Spence grew up in Cerritos, a city in Los Angeles County. She is one of three daughters of Tom and Francine Spence. Her father worked as a school teacher at a Cerritos College and was the men's tennis coach there.

=== Junior career ===
With her father as coach, she began playing tennis competitively at the age of eight.

In her early years she was followed around the tour by author Karen Stabiner, who wrote a book called "Courting Fame", an at times critical portrayal of the promising junior, which attracted attention towards a young Spence.

She won the 1983 Orange Bowl competition and was runner-up to Pascale Paradis in the girls' singles at the 1983 French Open.

At the age of 16, as the top-ranked amateur in the country at under-18 level, she made the decision to quit high school in order to prepare herself for a career in professional tennis.

=== Professional tennis ===
Spence began competing professionally in 1984 and made her grand slam debut at the 1984 US Open, where she beat Alycia Moulton in the first round, then took ninth seed Lisa Bonder to three sets in a second round loss. Only a month after she turned professional, aged 17, she won the 1984 Ginny of San Diego, over Betsy Nagelsen in the final. She ended her first year on tour with a world ranking of 47.

In 1985 she was a semi-finalist at the Ginny Championships in Florida and made it to the quarter-finals of a further four WTA tournaments, as well as the fourth round of the 1985 French Open.

At the beginning of the 1986 season she was ranked a career best 35 in the world. By 1987 however she had dropped out of the top 100 and she retired from professional tennis after the 1987 US Open, aged 20.

=== Life after tennis ===
Now known by her married name Nasim, she works as a realtor in Carlsbad, California.

== WTA Tour finals ==
=== Singles (1-0) ===
Result	Date	Tournament	Tier	Surface	Opponent	Score
Win	September, 1984	San Diego, U.S.	Ginny Circuit	Hard	(United States) Betsy Nagelsen	6–3, 6–7, 6–4

Sporting positions
Preceded by (Canada) Carling Bassett	Orange Bowl Girls' Singles Champion; Category: 18 and under 1983	Succeeded by (Italy) Gabriela Sabatini
