= 2009 Regions Morgan Keegan Championships – Singles =

Singles
- 2009 Regions Morgan Keegan Championships and the Cellular South Cup

Final
- Champion: (United States) Andy Roddick
- Runner-up: (Czech Republic) Radek Štěpánek
- Score: 7–5, 7–5

Details
- Draw: 32
- Seeds: 8

Events
Singles	men	women
Doubles	men	women
← 2008 ·	Regions Morgan Keegan Championships	· 2010 →
← 2008 ·	Cellular South Cup	· 2010 →

Steve Darcis was the defending champion, but lost in the first round to Andy Roddick, who went on to win the title by defeating Radek Štěpánek in the final, 7–5, 7–5.

== Seeds ==
1. (United States) Andy Roddick (champion)
2. (Argentina) Juan Martín del Potro (quarterfinals)
3. (United States) James Blake (first round)
4. (Sweden) Robin Söderling (first round)
5. (Czech Republic) Radek Štěpánek (final)
6. (Russia) Igor Andreev (first round)
7. (United States) Mardy Fish (second round)
8. (United States) Sam Querrey (quarterfinals)

== Draw ==
=== Key ===
- Q = Qualifier
- WC = Wild card
- LL = Lucky loser
- Alt = Alternate
- SE = Special exempt
- PR = Protected ranking
- ITF = ITF entry
- JE = Junior exempt
- w/o = Walkover
- r = Retired
- d = Defaulted
- SR = Special ranking

=== Finals ===
Semifinals
1/WC	(United States) Andy Roddick	2	7^{7}	6
(Australia) Lleyton Hewitt	6	6^{4}	4
Q	(Israel) Dudi Sela	3	1
5	(Czech Republic) Radek Štěpánek	6	6

Final
1/WC	(United States) Andy Roddick	7	7
5	(Czech Republic) Radek Štěpánek	5	5

=== Top half ===
First round
1/WC	(United States) A Roddick	7^{7}	6
(Belgium) S Darcis	6^{1}	2
(United States) R Ginepri	6	6
Q	(Germany) S Greul	4	4
WC	(Cyprus) M Baghdatis	7	6
(Japan) K Nishikori	5	3
(Germany) T Haas	6^{4}	4
8	(United States) S Querrey	7^{7}	6
3	(United States) J Blake	6	1	4
(Australia) L Hewitt	3	6	6
(United States) V Spadea	6^{1}	6^{5}
Q	(Australia) C Guccione	7^{7}	7^{7}
WC	(United States) D Young	4	3
(Belgium) C Rochus	6	6
(Chinese Taipei) Y-h Lu	1	5
7	(United States) M Fish	6	7

Second round
1/WC	(United States) A Roddick	6	6
(United States) R Ginepri	2	3
WC	(Cyprus) M Baghdatis	1	2
8	(United States) S Querrey	6	6
(Australia) L Hewitt	6	7^{7}
Q	(Australia) C Guccione	2	6^{4}
(Belgium) C Rochus	6	6
7	(United States) M Fish	2	4

Quarterfinals
1/WC	(United States) A Roddick	6	3	6
8	(United States) S Querrey	4	6	3
(Australia) L Hewitt	6	6
(Belgium) C Rochus	2	3

Semifinals
1/WC	(United States) A Roddick	2	7^{7}	6
(Australia) L Hewitt	6	6^{4}	4

=== Bottom half ===
First round
6	(Russia) I Andreev	6	4	3
(Russia) I Kunitsyn	1	6	6
(Finland) J Nieminen	3	4
(Germany) P Petzschner	6	6
Q	(Israel) D Sela	7^{7}	6
(United States) B Reynolds	6^{4}	2
(France) F Serra	6	6^{1}	6
4	(Sweden) R Söderling	4	7^{7}	2
5	(Czech Republic) R Štěpánek	6	6
Q	(United States) K Kim	4	2
(Austria) S Koubek	6	6
(Spain) G García López	2	2
(Latvia) E Gulbis	6	3	6
(United States) T Dent	4	6	2
(Argentina) G Cañas	3	6^{5}
2	(Argentina) JM del Potro	6	7^{7}

Second round
(Russia) I Kunitsyn	3	6	6
(Germany) P Petzschner	6	4	4
Q	(Israel) D Sela	7^{7}	7^{7}
(France) F Serra	6^{4}	6^{4}
5	(Czech Republic) R Štěpánek	6	6
(Austria) S Koubek	2	4
(Latvia) E Gulbis	3	4
2	(Argentina) JM del Potro	6	6

Quarterfinals
(Russia) I Kunitsyn	6	4	2
Q	(Israel) D Sela	4	6	6
5	(Czech Republic) R Štěpánek	7^{9}	6
2	(Argentina) JM del Potro	6^{7}	4

Semifinals
Q	(Israel) D Sela	3	1
5	(Czech Republic) R Štěpánek	6	6

== Qualifying ==
=== Seeds ===
1. (Luxembourg) Gilles Müller (first round)
2. (Israel) Dudi Sela (qualified)
3. (Croatia) Roko Karanušić (first round)
4. (Germany) Denis Gremelmayr (first round, retired due to Streptococcal pharyngitis)
5. (United States) Robert Kendrick (qualifying competition)
6. (United States) Wayne Odesnik (first round)
7. (United States) Kevin Kim (qualified)
8. (Kazakhstan) Evgeny Korolev (first round)

=== Qualifiers ===
1. (Germany) Simon Greul
2. (Israel) Dudi Sela
3. (Australia) Chris Guccione
4. (United States) Kevin Kim

=== Draw ===
==== First qualifier ====
First round
1	(Luxembourg) Gilles Müller	4	1
(Germany) Simon Greul	6	6
WC	(United States) John Isner	6	7^{7}
6	(United States) Wayne Odesnik	3	6^{4}

Qualifying competition
(Germany) Simon Greul	6^{9}	7^{7}	6
WC	(United States) John Isner	7^{11}	6^{4}	4

==== Second qualifier ====
First round
2	(Israel) Dudi Sela	7^{7}	6
(Canada) Frank Dancevic	6^{4}	3
WC	(Spain) Jorge Vazquez-Catoira	3	4
5	(United States) Robert Kendrick	6	6

Qualifying competition
2	(Israel) Dudi Sela	6	6
5	(United States) Robert Kendrick	4	4

==== Third qualifier ====
First round
3	(Croatia) Roko Karanušić	6^{5}	6	3
(Australia) Chris Guccione	7^{7}	1	6
(Bosnia and Herzegovina) Amer Delić	7^{7}	7
8	(Kazakhstan) Evgeny Korolev	6^{3}	5

Qualifying competition
(Australia) Chris Guccione	6	6
(Bosnia and Herzegovina) Amer Delić	3	3

==== Fourth qualifier ====
First round
4	(Germany) Denis Gremelmayr	5	0^{r}
(Canada) Jesse Levine	7	2
WC	(United States) Blake Strode	4	3
7	(United States) Kevin Kim	6	6

Qualifying competition
(Canada) Jesse Levine	6^{4}	5
7	(United States) Kevin Kim	7^{7}	7
