= 2009 Regions Morgan Keegan Championships and the Cellular South Cup =

2009 Regions Morgan Keegan Championships and Cellular South Cup
- Date: February 15–22
- Edition: 34th (men) / 24th (women)
- Category: ATP World Tour 500 (men); WTA International (woman)
- Surface: Hard
- Location: Memphis, Tennessee, US
- Venue: Racquet Club of Memphis

Champions

Men's singles
- (United States) Andy Roddick

Women's singles
- (Belarus) Victoria Azarenka

Men's doubles
- (United States) Mardy Fish / (The Bahamas) Mark Knowles

Women's doubles
- (Belarus) Victoria Azarenka / (Denmark) Caroline Wozniacki
← 2008 ·	Regions Morgan Keegan Championships	· 2010 →
← 2008 ·	Cellular South Cup	· 2010 →

The 2009 Regions Morgan Keegan Championships and the Cellular South Cup was an ATP World Tour and WTA Tour tennis tournament held at the hardcourts of the Racquet Club of Memphis in Memphis, Tennessee in the United States. It was the 34th edition of the Regions Morgan Keegan Championships and the 24th edition of the Cellular South Cup. The Regions Morgan Keegan Championships was part of the ATP World Tour 500 series on the 2009 ATP World Tour, and the Cellular South Cup was an International-level tournament on the 2009 WTA Tour. Both of the events took place from February 15 to February 22, 2009.

The men's draw was led by Australian Open & San Jose semifinalist plus 2002 champion Andy Roddick, Auckland champion Juan Martín del Potro, San Jose semifinalist plus 2002 runner-up James Blake, Auckland semifinalist and 2006 and 2008 runner-up Robin Söderling, Brisbane titlist Radek Štěpánek, Igor Andreev, Mardy Fish and Auckland runner-up Sam Querrey.

The women's draw was headed by WTA #12 Caroline Wozniacki, Brisbane winner Victoria Azarenka, Lucie Šafářová, Auckland semifinalist Anne Keothavong, Marina Erakovic, Sabine Lisicki, Alla Kudryavtseva and Pauline Parmentier.

== Finals ==
=== Men's singles ===
(United States) Andy Roddick defeated (Czech Republic) Radek Štěpánek, 7–5, 7–5

- It was Roddick's first title of the year and 27th of his career. It was his second win at the event, also winning in 2002.

=== Women's singles ===
(Belarus) Victoria Azarenka defeated (Denmark) Caroline Wozniacki, 6–1, 6–3

- It was Azarenka's 2nd title of the year and career.

=== Men's doubles ===
(United States) Mardy Fish / (The Bahamas) Mark Knowles defeated (United States) Travis Parrott / (Slovakia) Filip Polášek, 7–6^{(9–7)}, 6–1

=== Women's doubles ===
(Belarus) Victoria Azarenka / (Denmark) Caroline Wozniacki defeated (Ukraine) Yuliana Fedak / (Netherlands) Michaëlla Krajicek, 6–1, 7–6^{(7–2)}

== WTA entrants ==
=== Seeds ===
Athlete	Nationality	Ranking*	Seeding
Caroline Wozniacki	Denmark	12	1
Victoria Azarenka	Belarus	14	2
Lucie Šafářová	Czech Republic	50	3
Anne Keothavong	(United Kingdom) Great Britain	52	4
Marina Erakovic	New Zealand	57	5
Sabine Lisicki	Germany	59	6
Alla Kudryavtseva	Russia	62	7
Pauline Parmentier	France	86	8

- Rankings as of February 16, 2009.

=== Other entrants ===
The following players received wildcards into the main draw:

- (Portugal) Michelle Larcher de Brito
- (United States) Melanie Oudin
- (United States) Alexandra Stevenson

The following players received entry from the qualifying draw:

- (Australia) Jelena Dokić
- (Netherlands) Michaëlla Krajicek
- (South Africa) Chanelle Scheepers
- (United States) Alexa Glatch

== ATP entrants ==
=== Seeds ===
Athlete	Nationality	Ranking*	Seeding
Andy Roddick	United States	6	1
Juan Martín del Potro	Argentina	7	2
James Blake	United States	13	3
Robin Söderling	Sweden	16	4
Radek Štěpánek	Czech Republic	19	5
Igor Andreev	Russia	22	6
Mardy Fish	United States	21	7
Sam Querrey	United States	37	8

- Rankings as of February 16, 2009.

=== Other entrants ===
The following players received wildcards into the main draw:

- (United States) Andy Roddick
- (Cyprus) Marcos Baghdatis
- (United States) Donald Young

The following players received entry from the qualifying draw:

- (Australia) Chris Guccione
- (Israel) Dudi Sela
- (Germany) Simon Greul
- (United States) Kevin Kim
