= 2010 Regions Morgan Keegan Championships – Singles =

Singles
- 2010 Regions Morgan Keegan Championships and the Cellular South Cup

Final
- Champion: (United States) Sam Querrey
- Runner-up: (United States) John Isner
- Score: 6–7^{(3–7)}, 7–6^{(7–5)}, 6–3

Details
- Draw: 32
- Seeds: 8

Events
Singles	men	women
Doubles	men	women
← 2009 ·	Regions Morgan Keegan Championships	· 2011 →
← 2009 ·	Cellular South Cup	· 2011 →

Andy Roddick was the defending champion, but lost in the quarterfinals to Sam Querrey.
Sam Querrey won in the final 6–7^{(3–7)}, 7–6^{(7–5)}, 6–3, against John Isner.

== Seeds ==
1. (United States) Andy Roddick (quarterfinals)
2. (Spain) Fernando Verdasco (first round)
3. (Czech Republic) Radek Štěpánek (second round)
4. (Germany) Tommy Haas (first round)
5. (Czech Republic) Tomáš Berdych (quarterfinals)
6. (United States) John Isner (final)
7. (Germany) Philipp Kohlschreiber (first round)
8. (United States) Sam Querrey (champion)

== Draw ==
=== Key ===
- Q = Qualifier
- WC = Wild card
- LL = Lucky loser
- Alt = Alternate
- SE = Special exempt
- PR = Protected ranking
- ITF = ITF entry
- JE = Junior exempt
- w/o = Walkover
- r = Retired
- d = Defaulted
- SR = Special ranking

=== Finals ===
Semifinals
8	(United States) Sam Querrey	6	6
(Latvia) Ernests Gulbis	3	4
6	(United States) John Isner	7	4	6
(Germany) Philipp Petzschner	5	6	3

Final
8	(United States) Sam Querrey	6^{3}	7^{7}	6
6	(United States) John Isner	7^{7}	6^{5}	3

=== Top half ===
First round
1	(United States) A Roddick	6	4	7^{7}
(United States) J Blake	3	6	6^{3}
WC	(United States) R Ginepri	6	4	4
(Chinese Taipei) Y-h Lu	4	6	6
(Argentina) L Mayer	6	6
(United States) M Fish	4	0
(United States) R Ram	2	3
8	(United States) S Querrey	6	6
3	(Czech Republic) R Štěpánek	7	4	6
Q	(South Africa) K Anderson	5	6	4
(Latvia) E Gulbis	6	6
Q	(United States) R Kendrick	4	4
WC	(United States) W Odesnik	6	5	4
(United States) M Russell	0	7	6
Q	(United States) R Sweeting	2	1
5	(Czech Republic) T Berdych	6	6

Second round
1	(United States) A Roddick	7^{7}	6
(Chinese Taipei) Y-h Lu	6^{2}	4
(Argentina) L Mayer	4	0
8	(United States) S Querrey	6	6
3	(Czech Republic) R Štěpánek	6^{5}	5
(Latvia) E Gulbis	7^{7}	7
(United States) M Russell	6	3	2
5	(Czech Republic) T Berdych	3	6	6

Quarterfinals
1	(United States) A Roddick	5	6	1
8	(United States) S Querrey	7	3	6
(Latvia) E Gulbis	3	6	7^{7}
5	(Czech Republic) T Berdych	6	3	6^{3}

Semifinals
8	(United States) S Querrey	6	6
(Latvia) E Gulbis	3	4

=== Bottom half ===
First round
6	(United States) J Isner	6	7
Q	(United States) R Harrison	1	5
(Finland) J Nieminen	6	7
(Israel) D Sela	2	5
(Germany) B Becker	6^{6}	6^{4}
(Croatia) I Karlović	7^{8}	7^{7}
(Belgium) X Malisse	6	3	6
4	(Germany) T Haas	4	6	4
7	(Germany) P Kohlschreiber	5	5
(Kazakhstan) E Korolev	7	7
(United States) T Dent	6	3	4
(Germany) P Petzschner	1	6	6
WC	(United States) B Reynolds	6	6^{6}	4
(Slovakia) L Lacko	2	7^{8}	6
(France) J Chardy	7^{7}	6
2	(Spain) F Verdasco	6^{4}	3

Second round
6	(United States) J Isner	6^{3}	6	6
(Finland) J Nieminen	7^{7}	4	4
(Croatia) I Karlović	6	6
(Belgium) X Malisse	4	4
(Kazakhstan) E Korolev	6^{5}	6^{5}
(Germany) P Petzschner	7^{7}	7^{7}
(Slovakia) L Lacko	7^{7}	2
(France) J Chardy	6^{4}	1^{r}

Quarterfinals
6	(United States) J Isner	6	7^{9}
(Croatia) I Karlović	1	6^{7}
(Germany) P Petzschner	6	1	6
(Slovakia) L Lacko	1	6	1

Semifinals
6	(United States) J Isner	7	4	6
(Germany) P Petzschner	5	6	3

== Qualifying ==
=== Seeds ===
1. (Colombia) Santiago Giraldo (first round)
2. (Russia) Teymuraz Gabashvili (first round)
3. (United States) Kevin Kim (qualifying competition)
4. (Canada) Jesse Levine (qualifying competition, retired)
5. (South Africa) Kevin Anderson (qualified)
6. (United States) Robert Kendrick (qualified)
7. (United States) Michael Yani (first round)
8. (Chile) Paul Capdeville (first round)

=== Qualifiers ===
1. (United States) Ryan Sweeting
2. (South Africa) Kevin Anderson
3. (United States) Robert Kendrick
4. (United States) Ryan Harrison

=== Draw ===
==== First qualifier ====
First round
1	(Colombia) Santiago Giraldo	1	6^{5}
(Paraguay) Ramón Delgado	6	7^{7}
(United States) Ryan Sweeting	6	6
8	(Chile) Paul Capdeville	2	3

Qualifying competition
(Paraguay) Ramón Delgado	5	6	1
(United States) Ryan Sweeting	7	2	6

==== Second qualifier ====
First round
2	(Russia) Teymuraz Gabashvili	6^{2}	6^{4}
(United States) Donald Young	7^{7}	7^{7}
(United States) Jesse Witten	2	3
5	(South Africa) Kevin Anderson	6	6

Qualifying competition
(United States) Donald Young	4	7^{7}	3
5	(South Africa) Kevin Anderson	6	6^{5}	6

==== Third qualifier ====
First round
3	(United States) Kevin Kim	7^{7}	6
WC	(United States) Michael McClune	6^{5}	4
WC	(Australia) Damien Spizzo	2	2
6	(United States) Robert Kendrick	6	6

Qualifying competition
3	(United States) Kevin Kim	2	1
6	(United States) Robert Kendrick	6	6

==== Fourth qualifier ====
First round
4	(Canada) Jesse Levine	6	6
(Russia) Alex Bogomolov Jr.	4	4
WC	(United States) Ryan Harrison	4	7^{7}	6
7	(United States) Michael Yani	6	6^{1}	4

Qualifying competition
4	(Canada) Jesse Levine	6	3	1^{r}
WC	(United States) Ryan Harrison	4	6	2
