= 2010 Regions Morgan Keegan Championships and the Cellular South Cup =

2010 Regions Morgan Keegan Championships and Cellular South Cup
- Date: February 13–21
- Edition: 35th (Men) / 25th (Women)
- Category: ATP World Tour 500 (men); WTA International (women)
- Location: Memphis, Tennessee, US
- Venue: Racquet Club of Memphis

Champions

Men's singles
- (United States) Sam Querrey

Women's singles
- (Russia) Maria Sharapova

Men's doubles
- (United States) John Isner / (United States) Sam Querrey

Women's doubles
- (United States) Vania King / (Netherlands) Michaëlla Krajicek
← 2009 ·	Regions Morgan Keegan Championships	· 2011 →
← 2009 ·	Cellular South Cup	· 2011 →

The 2010 Regions Morgan Keegan Championships and the Cellular South Cup was an ATP World Tour and WTA Tour event held at the hardcourts of the Racquet Club of Memphis in Memphis, Tennessee, US. It was the 35th edition of the Regions Morgan Keegan Championships and the 25th edition of the Cellular South Cup. The Regions Morgan Keegan Championships was part of the ATP World Tour 500 series on the 2010 ATP World Tour, and the Cellular South Cup was an International-level tournament on the 2010 WTA Tour. The ATP event took place from February 13 to February 21, 2010, and the WTA event from February 12 to February 20.

The men's draw was led by 2009 Wimbledon finalist, 2010 Brisbane International champion and defending champion Andy Roddick, Fernando Verdasco, 2010 Heineken Open champion John Isner, and 2010 Brisbane International runner-up Radek Štěpánek. Other players are Tommy Haas, Philipp Kohlschreiber, and James Blake

The women's draw was headed by former world No. 1 Maria Sharapova, 2009 US Open quarterfinalist Melanie Oudin, homenation player Vania King, Kaia Kanepi, Czechs Lucie Hradecká and Petra Kvitová

== Finals ==
=== Men's singles ===
(United States) Sam Querrey defeated (United States) John Isner, 6–7^{(3–7)}, 7–6^{(7–5)}, 6–3

- It was Querrey's first title of the year and 3rd of his career.

=== Women's singles ===
(Russia) Maria Sharapova defeated (Sweden) Sofia Arvidsson, 6–2, 6–1

- It was Sharapova's first title of the year and 21st of her career.

=== Men's doubles ===
(United States) John Isner / (United States) Sam Querrey defeated (United Kingdom) Ross Hutchins / (Australia) Jordan Kerr, 6–4, 6–4

=== Women's doubles ===
(United States) Vania King / (Netherlands) Michaëlla Krajicek defeated (United States) Bethanie Mattek-Sands / (United States) Meghann Shaughnessy, 7–5, 6–2

== WTA entrants ==
=== Seeds ===
Athlete	Nationality	Ranking*	Seeding
Maria Sharapova	Russia	16	1
Melanie Oudin	United States	53	2
Kaia Kanepi	Estonia	61	3
Lucie Hradecká	Czech Republic	64	4
Petra Kvitová	Czech Republic	68	5
Kristina Barrois	Germany	70	6
Vania King	United States	73	7
Elena Baltacha	(United Kingdom) Great Britain	83	8

- Rankings are as of February 8, 2010.

=== Other entrants ===
The following players received wildcards into the main draw:

- (United States) Bethanie Mattek-Sands
- (Croatia) Ajla Tomljanović
- (Czech Republic) Nicole Vaidišová

The following players received entry from the qualifying draw:

- (Sweden) Sofia Arvidsson
- (United States) Madison Brengle
- (United States) Alexa Glatch
- (Canada) Valérie Tétreault

== ATP entrants ==
=== Seeds ===
Athlete	Nationality	Ranking*	Seeding
Andy Roddick	United States	7	1
Fernando Verdasco	Spain	11	2
Radek Štěpánek	Czech Republic	14	3
Tommy Haas	Germany	17	4
Tomáš Berdych	Czech Republic	23	5
John Isner	United States	25	6
Philipp Kohlschreiber	Germany	29	7
Sam Querrey	United States	31	8

- Rankings are as of February 8, 2010.

=== Other entrants ===
The following players received wildcards into the main draw:

- (United States) Robby Ginepri
- (United States) Wayne Odesnik
- (United States) Bobby Reynolds

The following players received entry from the qualifying draw:

- (South Africa) Kevin Anderson
- (United States) Ryan Harrison
- (United States) Robert Kendrick
- (United States) Ryan Sweeting
