= 2010 Regions Morgan Keegan Championships – Doubles =

Doubles
- 2010 Regions Morgan Keegan Championships and the Cellular South Cup

Final
- Champions: (United States) John Isner (United States) Sam Querrey
- Runners-up: (United Kingdom) Ross Hutchins (Australia) Jordan Kerr
- Score: 6–4, 6–4

Events
Singles	men	women
Doubles	men	women
← 2009 ·	Regions Morgan Keegan Championships	· 2011 →
← 2009 ·	Cellular South Cup	· 2011 →

Mardy Fish and Mark Knowles were the defending champions; however, they decided to retire their match against John Isner and Sam Querrey, when result of this match was 6–3, 5–7.
Isner and Querrey won in the final 6–4, 6–4, against Ross Hutchins and Jordan Kerr.

== Seeds ==
1. (India) Mahesh Bhupathi / (Belarus) Max Mirnyi (first round)
2. (United States) Mardy Fish / (The Bahamas) Mark Knowles (semifinals, retired)
3. (Brazil) Marcelo Melo / (Brazil) Bruno Soares (first round)
4. (Czech Republic) Martin Damm / (Slovakia) Filip Polášek (first round)

== Draw ==
=== Key ===
- Q = Qualifier
- WC = Wild card
- LL = Lucky loser
- Alt = Alternate
- SE = Special exempt
- PR = Protected ranking
- ITF = ITF entry
- JE = Junior exempt
- w/o = Walkover
- r = Retired
- d = Defaulted
- SR = Special ranking

=== Draws ===
First round
1	(India) M Bhupathi (Belarus) M Mirnyi	4	4
(United States) E Butorac (United States) R Ram	6	6
(Germany) B Becker (France) J Chardy	5	2
WC	(United States) S Lipsky (United States) D Martin	7	6
4	(Czech Republic) M Damm (Slovakia) F Polášek	3	6^{9}
(United Kingdom) R Hutchins (Australia) J Kerr	6	7^{11}
(Germany) M Kohlmann (Finland) J Nieminen	7	6
(Croatia) I Karlović (Serbia) D Vemić	5	4
ALT	(United States) R Ginepri (United States) T Rettenmaier	4	5
(Argentina) L Mayer (Israel) D Sela	6	7
(United States) J Isner (United States) S Querrey	7	4	[10]
3	(Brazil) M Melo (Brazil) B Soares	5	6	[8]
WC	(United States) J Blake (United States) B Reynolds	4	4
(Australia) S Huss (Czech Republic) J Levinský	6	6
(Sweden) J Brunström (Netherlands Antilles) J-J Rojer	7^{8}	6^{5}	[11]
2	(United States) M Fish (The Bahamas) M Knowles	6^{6}	7^{7}	[13]

Quarterfinals
(United States) E Butorac (United States) R Ram	6	6^{5}	[7]
WC	(United States) S Lipsky (United States) D Martin	4	7^{7}	[10]
(United Kingdom) R Hutchins (Australia) J Kerr	6	6
(Germany) M Kohlmann (Finland) J Nieminen	2	4
(Argentina) L Mayer (Israel) D Sela	6^{6}	4
(United States) J Isner (United States) S Querrey	7^{8}	6
(Australia) S Huss (Czech Republic) J Levinský	6	3	[4]
2	(United States) M Fish (The Bahamas) M Knowles	4	6	[10]

Semifinals
WC	(United States) S Lipsky (United States) D Martin	6^{6}	6^{4}
(United Kingdom) R Hutchins (Australia) J Kerr	7^{8}	7^{7}
(United States) J Isner (United States) S Querrey	3	7	[6]
2	(United States) M Fish (The Bahamas) M Knowles	6	5	[3^{r}]

Final
(United Kingdom) R Hutchins (Australia) J Kerr	4	4
(United States) J Isner (United States) S Querrey	6	6
