= 2010 Cellular South Cup – Doubles =

Doubles
- 2010 Regions Morgan Keegan Championships and the Cellular South Cup

Final
- Champions: (United States) Vania King (Netherlands) Michaëlla Krajicek
- Runners-up: (United States) Bethanie Mattek-Sands (United States) Meghann Shaughnessy
- Score: 7–5, 6–2

Details
- Draw: 16
- Seeds: 4

Events
Singles	men	women
Doubles	men	women
← 2009 ·	Regions Morgan Keegan Championships	· 2011 →
← 2009 ·	Cellular South Cup	· 2011 →

Victoria Azarenka and Caroline Wozniacki were the defending champions, but they chose to compete in 2010 Dubai Tennis Championships instead.
Vania King and Michaëlla Krajicek won in the final 7–5, 6–2 against Bethanie Mattek-Sands and Meghann Shaughnessy.

== Seeds ==
1. (Czech Republic) Vladimíra Uhlířová / (Czech Republic) Renata Voráčová (first round)
2. (Romania) Monica Niculescu / (United States) Riza Zalameda (semifinals)
3. (United States) Vania King / (Netherlands) Michaëlla Krajicek (champions)
4. (Russia) Maria Kondratieva / (France) Sophie Lefèvre (first round)

== Draw ==
=== Key ===
- Q = Qualifier
- WC = Wild card
- LL = Lucky loser
- Alt = Alternate
- ITF = ITF entry
- PR = Protected ranking
- SR = Special ranking
- SE = Special exempt
- JE = Junior exempt
- JR = Junior Accelerator Programme entrant
- CO = College Accelerator Programme entrant
- NG = Next Gen Accelerator Program entrant
- w/o = Walkover
- r = Retired
- d = Defaulted

=== Draws ===
First round
1	(Czech Republic) V Uhlířová (Czech Republic) R Voráčová	5	5
(France) Y Fedossova (Russia) K Lykina	7	7
(France) S Beltrame (Czech Republic) L Hradecká	2	5
(United States) B Mattek-Sands (United States) M Shaughnessy	6	7
4	(Russia) M Kondratieva (France) S Lefèvre	3	6^{3}
(France) S Cohen-Aloro (Slovakia) K Kučová	6	7
(Poland) M Domachowska (United Kingdom) A Keothavong	3	4
(United States) M Oudin (United States) S Perry	6	6
WC	(Netherlands) A Rus (Czech Republic) N Vaidišová	3	1
(Greece) E Daniilidou (Germany) J Wöhr	6	6
WC	(United States) C Collins (United States) M Ondeck	0	0
3	(United States) V King (Netherlands) M Krajicek	6	6
(United States) L Granville (United States) L Osterloh	6^{5}	4
(Germany) K Barrois (Germany) K Wörle	7	6
(United States) A Glatch (United States) A Haynes	6	4	6
2	(Romania) M Niculescu (United States) R Zalameda	1	6	[10]

Quarterfinals
(France) Y Fedossova (Russia) K Lykina	3	0
(United States) B Mattek-Sands (United States) M Shaughnessy	6	6
(France) S Cohen-Aloro (Slovakia) K Kučová	2	3
(United States) M Oudin (United States) S Perry	6	6
(Greece) E Daniilidou (Germany) J Wöhr	4	6^{3}
3	(United States) V King (Netherlands) M Krajicek	6	7
(Germany) K Barrois (Germany) K Wörle	5	6	[8]
2	(Romania) M Niculescu (United States) R Zalameda	7	4	[10]

Semifinals
(United States) B Mattek-Sands (United States) M Shaughnessy	6	6
(United States) M Oudin (United States) S Perry	2	2
3	(United States) V King (Netherlands) M Krajicek	6	6
2	(Romania) M Niculescu (United States) R Zalameda	1	4

Final
(United States) B Mattek-Sands (United States) M Shaughnessy	5	2
3	(United States) V King (Netherlands) M Krajicek	7	6
