= 1977 U.S. National Indoor Championships =

- Date: February 28 – March 6
- Edition: 8th
- Category: Grand Prix
- Draw: 64S / 32D
- Prize money: $175,000
- Surface: Hard / Indoor
- Location: Memphis, TN, United States
- Venue: Racquet Club of Memphis

Champions

Singles
- (Sweden) Björn Borg

Doubles
- (United States) Fred McNair / (United States) Sherwood Stewart
- U.S. National Indoor Championships

The 1977 U.S. National Indoor Championships was a men's tennis tournament played on indoor hard courts at the Racquet Club of Memphis in Memphis, Tennessee in the United States that was part of the 1977 Colgate-Palmolive Grand Prix. It was the eighth edition of the tournament was held from February 28 through March 6, 1977. First-seeded Björn Borg won the singles title and $24,500 first-prize money.

During his second-round match against Jeff Borowiak on March 2, 1977, Borg broke from his usual calm court demeanor when he contested calls made by Memphis-based linesman Edgar Bran. Bran made two foot faults and two baseline calls against Borg, which the tennis star felt were "very bad calls." The Commercial Appeal reported that moments after Borg's fourth foot fault of the tournament was called, he twice said to Bran, "You s.o.b., I'm going to throw you out," before conferring with match umpire Herb Kosten and tournament referee Roy Dance on-court to request Bran's removal formally. After consulting with Kosten, Dance removed Bran "in the interest of continuing the match," replacing him with Bill Baskin Sr., also a Memphian. Both Dance and Kosten emphasized that they "still' had great confidence" in Bran's judgment, and that the decision to remove him had absolutely nothing to do with Borg's star status.

Borg remained upset after the match, claiming this was the first tournament since Wimbledon in 1973 that he had foot faults called against him. "If (Bran) had stayed, I would have lost the match because I had lost all confidence in him. I just want to say that linesmen can make mistakes, too."

Although Borg "had no regrets" about using profanity with Bran, Dance said he had no way to know if the Professional Tennis Council would address a possible complaint. The Association of Tennis Professionals handbook at the time of the altercation stated, "A player who verbally or physically abuses the umpire, officials, opponents, or spectators is subject to default. This also carries a fine of $500." This incident became the first protest ever filed against Borg. Borg never again played in the tournament.

Bran maintained that he made the right call. "He carried his foot onto the (service) line and that's a foot fault, and I called it. I stand by the call." Bran returned to his linesman duties the next day, on March 3, 1977. Bran remained an active linesmen for years after, including calling lines at the 1987 U.S. Open in Flushing Meadows, New York.

== Finals ==
=== Singles ===
(Sweden) Björn Borg defeated (United States) Brian Gottfried 6–4, 6–3, 4–6, 7–5

- It was Borg's first singles title of the year and the 20th of his career.

=== Doubles ===
(United States) Fred McNair / (United States) Sherwood Stewart defeated (United States) Bob Lutz / (United States) Stan Smith 4–6, 7–6, 7–6
