= 2009 Cellular South Cup – Doubles =

Doubles
- 2009 Regions Morgan Keegan Championships and the Cellular South Cup

Final
- Champions: (Belarus) Victoria Azarenka (Denmark) Caroline Wozniacki
- Runners-up: (Ukraine) Yuliana Fedak (Netherlands) Michaëlla Krajicek
- Score: 6–1, 7–6^{(7–2)}

Details
- Draw: 16
- Seeds: 4

Events
Singles	men	women
Doubles	men	women
← 2008 ·	Regions Morgan Keegan Championships	· 2010 →
← 2008 ·	Cellular South Cup	· 2010 →

Lindsay Davenport and Lisa Raymond were the defending champions, but they chose not to participate this year.

== Seeds ==
1. (United States) Vania King / (Russia) Alla Kudryavtseva (semifinals)
2. (Belarus) Victoria Azarenka / (Denmark) Caroline Wozniacki (champions)
3. (New Zealand) Marina Erakovic / (Czech Republic) Lucie Šafářová (first round)
4. (Latvia) Līga Dekmeijere / (Belarus) Ekaterina Dzehalevich (first round)

== Draw ==
Key

- Q = Qualifier
- WC = Wild card
- LL = Lucky loser
- Alt = Alternate
- ITF = ITF entry
- PR = Protected ranking
- SR = Special ranking
- SE = Special exempt
- JE = Junior exempt
- JR = Junior Accelerator Programme entrant
- CO = College Accelerator Programme entrant
- NG = Next Gen Accelerator Program entrant
- w/o = Walkover
- r = Retired
- d = Defaulted

First round
1	(United States) V King (Russia) A Kudryavtseva	7	6
(United States) C Fusano (United States) A Haynes	6^{2}	2
(Italy) ME Camerin (United Kingdom) A Keothavong	6	6
(Hungary) M Czink (Canada) S Dubois	1	1
4	(Latvia) L Dekmeijere (Belarus) E Dzehalevich	4	3
(Ukraine) Y Fedak (Netherlands) M Krajicek	6	6
(United States) J Craybas (United States) M Washington	7	6
(South Africa) C Scheepers (United States) A Spears	6^{3}	0
(Germany) K Barrois (Czech Republic) L Hradecká	4	5
(Chinese Taipei) C-w Chan (South Africa) N Grandin	6	7
(Russia) M Kondratieva (France) S Lefèvre	3	6	[10]
3	(New Zealand) M Erakovic (Czech Republic) L Šafářová	6	4	[7]
(United States) J Ditty (United States) C Gullickson	2	5
WC	(United States) A Glatch (United States) S Perry	6	7
(United Kingdom) S Borwell (United States) C Nagle	4	2
2	(Belarus) V Azarenka (Denmark) C Wozniacki	6	6

Quarterfinals
1	(United States) V King (Russia) A Kudryavtseva	6	6
(Italy) ME Camerin (United Kingdom) A Keothavong	4	4
(Ukraine) Y Fedak (Netherlands) M Krajicek	6^{5}	6	[10]
(United States) J Craybas (United States) M Washington	7	4	[4]
(Chinese Taipei) C-w Chan (South Africa) N Grandin	4	6	[6]
(Russia) M Kondratieva (France) S Lefèvre	6	1	[10]
WC	(United States) A Glatch (United States) S Perry	3	0
2	(Belarus) V Azarenka (Denmark) C Wozniacki	6	6

Semifinals
1	(United States) V King (Russia) A Kudryavtseva	6^{3}	6	[5]
(Ukraine) Y Fedak (Netherlands) M Krajicek	7	4	[10]
(Russia) M Kondratieva (France) S Lefèvre	1	2
2	(Belarus) V Azarenka (Denmark) C Wozniacki	6	6

Final
(Ukraine) Y Fedak (Netherlands) M Krajicek	1	6^{2}
2	(Belarus) V Azarenka (Denmark) C Wozniacki	6	7
