= 2009 Cellular South Cup – Singles =

Singles
- 2009 Regions Morgan Keegan Championships and the Cellular South Cup

Final
- Champion: (Belarus) Victoria Azarenka
- Runner-up: (Denmark) Caroline Wozniacki
- Score: 6–1, 6–3

Details
- Draw: 32
- Seeds: 8

Events
Singles	men	women
Doubles	men	women
- Regions Morgan Keegan Championships Cellular South Cup

Lindsay Davenport was the defending champion, but was off the Tour indefinitely due to pregnancy.

Victoria Azarenka won the title, defeating Caroline Wozniacki 6–1, 6–3 in the final.

== Seeds ==
1. (Denmark) Caroline Wozniacki (final)
2. (Belarus) Victoria Azarenka (champion)
3. (Czech Republic) Lucie Šafářová (quarterfinals)
4. (United Kingdom) Anne Keothavong (semifinals)
5. (New Zealand) Marina Erakovic (quarterfinals)
6. (Germany) Sabine Lisicki (semifinals)
7. (Russia) Alla Kudryavtseva (first round)
8. (France) Pauline Parmentier (quarterfinals)

== Draw ==
Key

- Q = Qualifier
- WC = Wild card
- LL = Lucky loser
- Alt = Alternate
- ITF = ITF entry
- PR = Protected ranking
- SR = Special ranking
- SE = Special exempt
- JE = Junior exempt
- JR = Junior Accelerator Programme entrant
- CO = College Accelerator Programme entrant
- NG = Next Gen Accelerator Program entrant
- w/o = Walkover
- r = Retired
- d = Defaulted

=== Finals ===
Semifinals
1	(Denmark) Caroline Wozniacki	6	6
4	(United Kingdom) Anne Keothavong	1	0
6	(Germany) Sabine Lisicki	4	6	6^{1}
2	(Belarus) Victoria Azarenka	6	3	7

Final
1	(Denmark) Caroline Wozniacki	1	3
2	(Belarus) Victoria Azarenka	6	6

=== Top half ===
First round
1	(Denmark) C Wozniacki	6	6
Q	(Australia) J Dokić	1	2
(Belgium) K Flipkens	4	0
(France) S Brémond	6	6
(Germany) K Barrois	6	5	7
(Slovakia) J Groth	2	7	6^{3}
Q	(Netherlands) M Krajicek	6	6
7	(Russia) A Kudryavtseva	1	4
4	(United Kingdom) A Keothavong	3	6	6
(Italy) ME Camerin	6	3	1
WC	(Portugal) M Larcher de Brito	6	6
(Sweden) S Arvidsson	2	0
WC	(United States) M Oudin	6	4	6
(United States) J Craybas	3	6	4
(United States) J Ditty	6^{4}	0
5	(New Zealand) M Erakovic	7	6

Second round
1	(Denmark) C Wozniacki	6	7
(France) S Brémond	1	6^{1}
(Germany) K Barrois	3	6	6^{0}
Q	(Netherlands) M Krajicek	6	3	7
4	(United Kingdom) A Keothavong	7	6
WC	(Portugal) M Larcher de Brito	6^{2}	4
WC	(United States) M Oudin	6	2	3
5	(New Zealand) M Erakovic	4	6	6

Quarterfinals
1	(Denmark) C Wozniacki	2	6	6
Q	(Netherlands) M Krajicek	6	3	3
4	(United Kingdom) A Keothavong	6	1	6
5	(New Zealand) M Erakovic	2	6	2

Semifinals
1	(Denmark) C Wozniacki	6	6
4	(United Kingdom) A Keothavong	1	0

=== Bottom half ===
First round
6	(Germany) S Lisicki	6	6
(Russia) E Bychkova	3	3
(France) S Foretz	6	4	6
(Hungary) M Czink	2	6	2
WC	(United States) A Stevenson	2	6^{5}
(United States) V King	6	7
(United Kingdom) M South	2	2
3	(Czech Republic) L Šafářová	6	6
8	(France) P Parmentier	7	4	6
(France) J Coin	6^{6}	6	1
(Czech Republic) L Hradecká	1	7	6^{5}
Q	(South Africa) C Scheepers	6	5	7
Q	(United States) A Glatch	3	3
(France) S Cohen-Aloro	6	6
(United States) V Lepchenko	2	2
2	(Belarus) V Azarenka	6	6

Second round
6	(Germany) S Lisicki	6	6
(France) S Foretz	2	4
(United States) V King	6^{1}	3
3	(Czech Republic) L Šafářová	7	6
8	(France) P Parmentier	6	6
Q	(South Africa) C Scheepers	4	1
(France) S Cohen-Aloro	2	2
2	(Belarus) V Azarenka	6	6

Quarterfinals
6	(Germany) S Lisicki	6	6
3	(Czech Republic) L Šafářová	3	4
8	(France) P Parmentier	4	2
2	(Belarus) V Azarenka	6	6

Semifinals
6	(Germany) S Lisicki	4	6	6^{1}
2	(Belarus) V Azarenka	6	3	7
