= 2010 Cellular South Cup – Singles =

Singles
- 2010 Regions Morgan Keegan Championships and the Cellular South Cup

Final
- Champion: (Russia) Maria Sharapova
- Runner-up: (Sweden) Sofia Arvidsson
- Score: 6–2, 6–1

Details
- Draw: 32
- Seeds: 8

Events
Singles	men	women
Doubles	men	women
- Regions Morgan Keegan Championships Cellular South Cup

Victoria Azarenka was the defending champion, but she chose to compete in 2010 Dubai Tennis Championships instead.
Maria Sharapova won in the final 6–2, 6–1 against Sofia Arvidsson.

== Seeds ==
1. (Russia) Maria Sharapova (champion)
2. (United States) Melanie Oudin (quarterfinals)
3. (Estonia) Kaia Kanepi (quarterfinals)
4. (Czech Republic) Lucie Hradecká (first round)
5. (Czech Republic) Petra Kvitová (semifinals)
6. (Germany) Kristina Barrois (first round)
7. (United States) Vania King (second round)
8. (United Kingdom) Elena Baltacha (quarterfinals)

== Draw ==
Key

- Q = Qualifier
- WC = Wild card
- LL = Lucky loser
- Alt = Alternate
- ITF = ITF entry
- PR = Protected ranking
- SR = Special ranking
- SE = Special exempt
- JE = Junior exempt
- JR = Junior Accelerator Programme entrant
- CO = College Accelerator Programme entrant
- NG = Next Gen Accelerator Program entrant
- w/o = Walkover
- r = Retired
- d = Defaulted

=== Finals ===
Semifinals
1	(Russia) Maria Sharapova	6	6
5	(Czech Republic) Petra Kvitová	4	3
(United Kingdom) Anne Keothavong	4	6	4
Q	(Sweden) Sofia Arvidsson	6	4	6

Final
1	(Russia) Maria Sharapova	6	6
Q	(Sweden) Sofia Arvidsson	2	1

=== Top half ===
First round
1	(Russia) M Sharapova	6	6
(United States) S Perry	0	2
WC	(United States) B Mattek-Sands	6	6
(United Kingdom) K O'Brien	2	1
(Romania) M Niculescu	3	4
Q	(Canada) V Tétreault	6	6
(Czech Republic) R Voráčová	5	1
8	(United Kingdom) E Baltacha	7	6
3	(Estonia) K Kanepi	6	6
(Netherlands) A Rus	0	4
(United States) L Granville	4	2
WC	(Czech Republic) N Vaidišová	6	6
(Germany) J Schruff	6	1	2
(Netherlands) M Krajicek	2	6	6
(France) S Cohen-Aloro	4	0
5	(Czech Republic) P Kvitová	6	6

Second round
1	(Russia) M Sharapova	6	6
WC	(United States) B Mattek-Sands	1	1
Q	(Canada) V Tétreault	4	4
8	(United Kingdom) E Baltacha	6	6
3	(Estonia) K Kanepi	4	6	6
WC	(Czech Republic) N Vaidišová	6	1	3
(Netherlands) M Krajicek	4	5
5	(Czech Republic) P Kvitová	6	7

Quarterfinals
1	(Russia) M Sharapova	6	7
8	(United Kingdom) E Baltacha	2	5
3	(Estonia) K Kanepi	6	3	6^{0}
5	(Czech Republic) P Kvitová	1	6	7

Semifinals
1	(Russia) M Sharapova	6	6
5	(Czech Republic) P Kvitová	4	3

=== Bottom half ===
First round
6	(Germany) K Barrois	1	3
(United Kingdom) A Keothavong	6	6
(Portugal) M Larcher de Brito	6	6
Q	(United States) M Brengle	3	3
WC	(Croatia) A Tomljanović	6	6
(Slovakia) K Kučová	4	4
(Croatia) K Šprem	6	6
4	(Czech Republic) L Hradecká	4	4
7	(United States) V King	6	6
(Germany) K Wörle	3	4
Q	(Sweden) S Arvidsson	5	6	6
(Poland) M Domachowska	7	4	3
(Canada) S Dubois	6	4	4
(United States) L Osterloh	3	6	6
Q	(United States) A Glatch	2	2
2	(United States) M Oudin	6	6

Second round
(United Kingdom) A Keothavong	6	6
(Portugal) M Larcher de Brito	3	1
WC	(Croatia) A Tomljanović	6	2	0
(Croatia) K Šprem	3	6	6
7	(United States) V King	6	4	2
Q	(Sweden) S Arvidsson	3	6	6
(United States) L Osterloh	2	1
2	(United States) M Oudin	6	6

Quarterfinals
(United Kingdom) A Keothavong	6	6
(Croatia) K Šprem	4	3
Q	(Sweden) S Arvidsson	6	6
2	(United States) M Oudin	1	3

Semifinals
(United Kingdom) A Keothavong	4	6	4
Q	(Sweden) S Arvidsson	6	4	6
