= Sam Querrey =

American tennis player (born 1987)

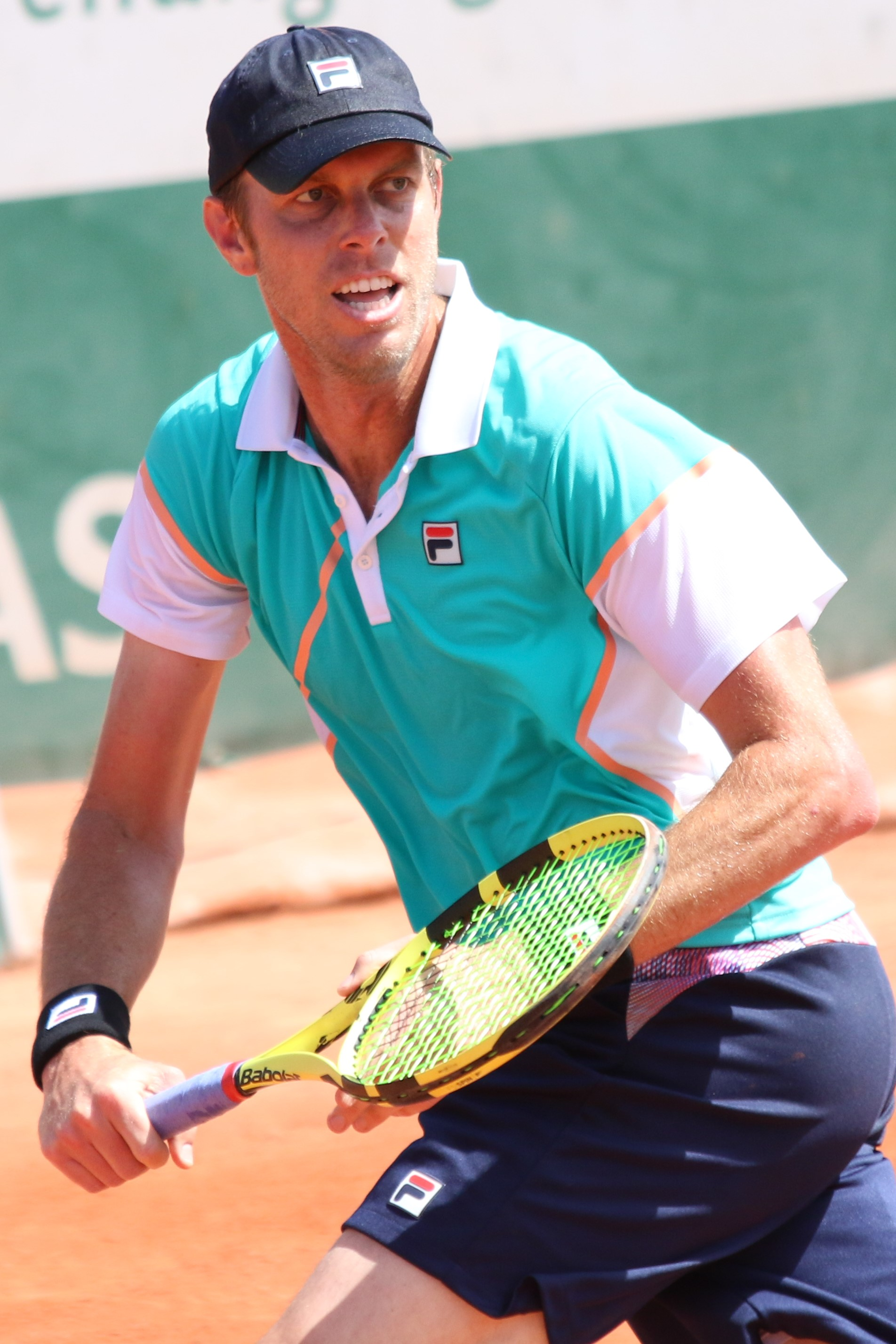
- Querrey at the 2022 French Open
- Full name: Samuel Austin Querrey
- Country (sports): United States
- Residence: Las Vegas, Nevada, US
- Born: October 7, 1987 (age 39) San Francisco, California, US
- Height: 6 ft 6 in (1.98 m)
- Turned pro: 2006
- Retired: 2022
- Plays: Right-handed (two-handed backhand)
- Prize money: US$13,588,615

Singles
- Career record: 385–330 (53.8%)
- Career titles: 10
- Highest ranking: No. 11 (February 26, 2018)

Grand Slam singles results
- Australian Open: 3R (2007, 2008, 2013, 2014, 2017, 2020)
- French Open: 3R (2013)
- Wimbledon: SF (2017)
- US Open: QF (2017)

Other tournaments
- Tour Finals: Alt (2017)
- Olympic Games: 1R (2008)

Doubles
- Career record: 177–188 (48.5%)
- Career titles: 5
- Highest ranking: No. 23 (May 17, 2018)

Grand Slam doubles results
- Australian Open: SF (2019)
- French Open: 3R (2008)
- Wimbledon: 2R (2009, 2015)
- US Open: SF (2015, 2021)

Grand Slam mixed doubles results
- US Open: F (2015)

Team competitions
- Davis Cup: SF (2008, 2012, 2018)

Samuel Austin Querrey (/ˈkwɛri/ KWERR-ee or /ˈkwɪəri/; born October 7, 1987) is a former American tennis player. He reached a career-high singles ranking of world No. 11 achieved on February 26, 2018, and won ten ATP singles titles. Known for his powerful serve, Querrey holds the record for consecutive service aces in a match with 10. He was also a capable doubles player, with five ATP doubles titles and a career-high doubles ranking of No. 23 achieved on May 17, 2010. His best performance in a Grand Slam singles event was at the 2017 Wimbledon Championships, where he reached the semifinals after defeating world No. 1 Andy Murray in the quarterfinals to become the first American man to reach the last four of a Grand Slam in eight years. At the same tournament the previous year, he defeated world No. 1 Novak Djokovic to reach the quarterfinals, ending his Grand Slam win streak of 4 in a row. Other career highlights for Querrey include defeating former world number one Rafael Nadal in the Acapulco final of 2017, reaching the quarterfinals at the 2017 US Open and the 2019 Wimbledon Championships, and, in the 2015 US Open, reaching the mixed doubles final with Bethanie Mattek-Sands and the men's doubles semifinals with Steve Johnson. He also reached the semifinals of the Davis Cup three times with the United States team, in 2008, 2012, and 2018.

== Early life ==
Querrey was born in San Francisco and attended Thousand Oaks High School, graduating in 2006. Querrey turned down a scholarship offer from the University of Southern California (USC) to turn pro. His father Mike Querrey recommended that his son try making it in tennis, as he often regretted his own decision to attend the University of Arizona rather than play baseball for the Detroit Tigers, who had drafted him. Querrey said that going pro was "one of the toughest decisions of my life. [...] I'd play a match and want to go pro. I'd lose and want to go to college."

== Career ==
=== 2006: Grand Slam debut and first win ===
On June 11, 2006, Querrey became the first player to win a challenger event in his pro debut. He won in the Yuba City and Winnetka challengers. He won his first-round match at the Indian Wells Masters tournament over Bobby Reynolds, before falling to James Blake in three sets. He defeated American Vince Spadea at the Countrywide Classic in Los Angeles. At the 2006 US Open, Querrey received a wildcard and defeated Philipp Kohlschreiber in straight sets, before falling to Gastón Gaudio in the second round.

=== 2007: Australian Open third round, top 50 debut ===
At the 2007 Australian Open, he advanced to the third round. He defeated José Acasuso, the 27th seed, in the first round. In the second round, he defeated Frenchman Florent Serra in straight sets, but in the third round lost to 7th seed Tommy Robredo in four sets.

At the 2007 Indianapolis Tennis Championships, he hit 10 consecutive aces when he defeated James Blake in the quarterfinals. This is believed to be an Open Era record.

At the 2007 Western & Southern Open, he defeated thirteenth seed Mikhail Youzhny and advanced to the quarterfinals after defeating Argentina's Juan Mónaco, who had defeated Rafael Nadal in the previous round. He lost to No. 9 seed James Blake, but made his top 50 debut at No. 47 afterwards. At this time, Querrey was the third-ranked American behind Andy Roddick and Blake.

In August 2007 at the US Open, Austrian Stefan Koubek defeated Querrey in the first round.

=== 2008: First ATP World Tour title ===
In January 2008 at the Australian Open, Querrey defeated Belgian Olivier Rochus in the first round. In the second round, he then beat Russian Dmitry Tursunov. He lost in the third round to the eventual champion, Serbian Novak Djokovic.

In March, Querrey won his first ATP level tournament at the Tennis Channel Open in Las Vegas. In the final, Querrey defeated qualifier Kevin Anderson of South Africa in three sets. The next month, at the Monte-Carlo Masters, Querrey reached the quarterfinals, defeating former French Open champion Carlos Moyá, Andreas Seppi, and No. 7 seeded Richard Gasquet.

Querrey played tennis for the US at the Beijing Summer Olympics in 2008. He advanced to the fourth round of the US Open by defeating 14th seed Ivo Karlović of Croatia, where he was defeated in four sets by world No. 1 Rafael Nadal.

Querrey was tapped to play for the US in the Davis Cup semifinals against Spain as a replacement for James Blake, who had withdrawn citing exhaustion. In Querrey's first-ever Davis Cup match, he lost to world No. 1 Rafael Nadal in four sets.

=== 2009: Second ATP title ===
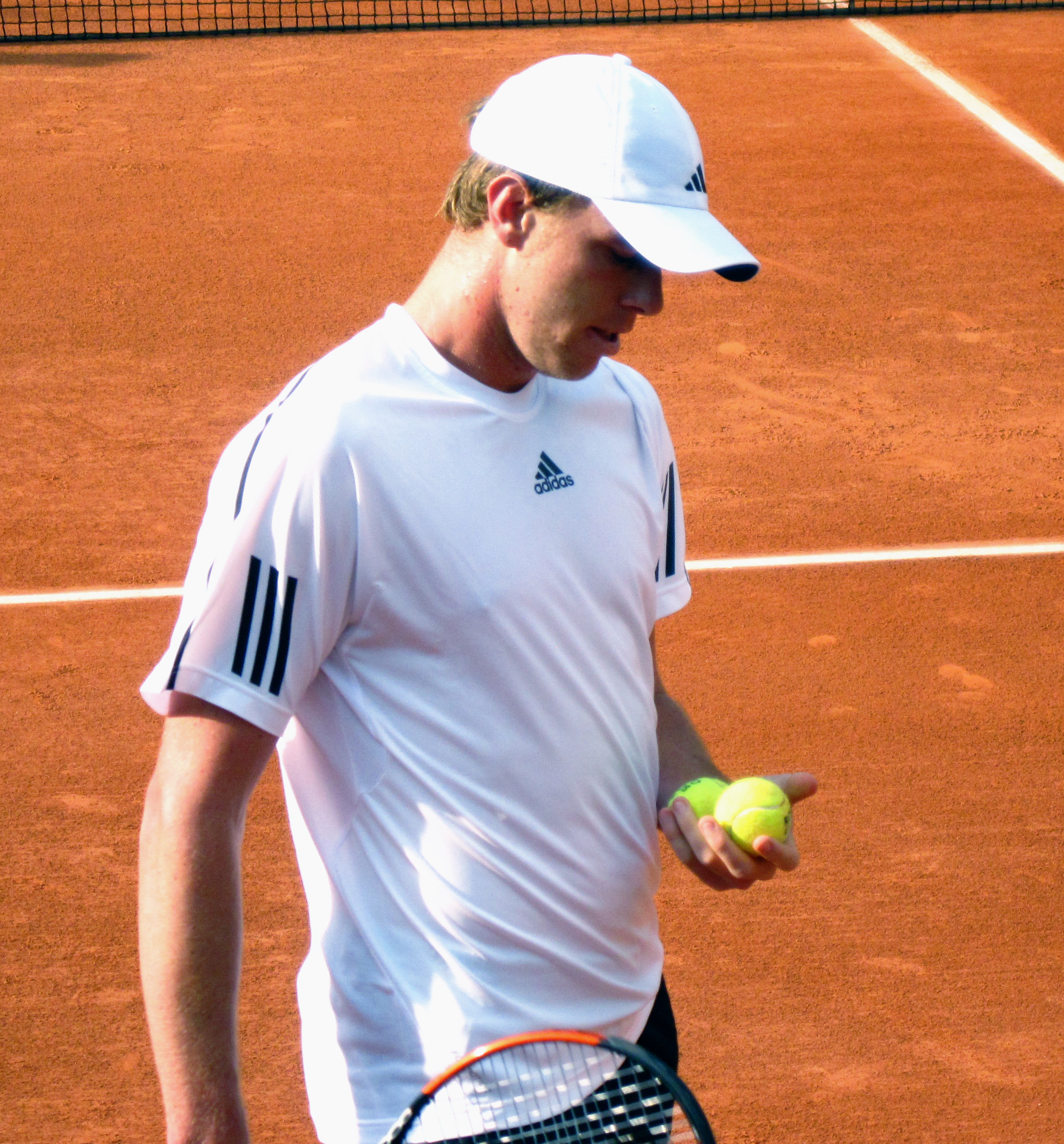
Querrey at the 2009 French Open

Querrey participated in the 2009 Heineken Open in Auckland, New Zealand in January, where he was the sixth seed. Querrey made it to the final, where he was defeated in straight sets by top-seed Juan Martín del Potro. In the 2009 Australian Open, Querrey lost in his opening round to Philipp Kohlschreiber. In the SAP Open in San Jose, Querrey beat Cypriot wildcard Marcos Baghdatis in the opening match. Querrey then beat Denis Gremelmayr, in 52 minutes.

In the 2009 Campbell's Hall of Fame Tennis Championships in Newport, Rhode Island, No. 3 seeded Querrey advanced to the final against compatriot and first-time finalist and lucky loser Rajeev Ram, who had entered the main draw when top seed Mardy Fish had to take Andy Roddick's place in the Davis Cup quarterfinals. Querrey lost the match. Querrey was seeded No. 3 for the 2009 Indianapolis Tennis Championships, where he made his second final in as many tournaments. However, Querrey fell to unseeded American Robby Ginepri.

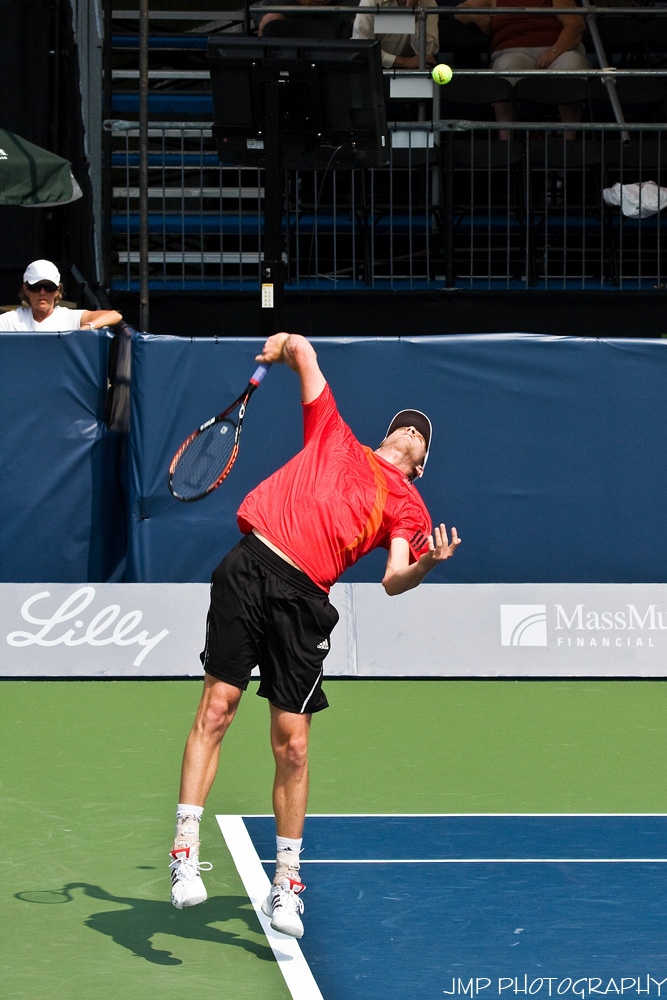
Querrey in Indianapolis

Querrey defeated No. 1 seeded Tommy Haas to advance to the final of the LA Tennis Open. He defeated qualifier Carsten Ball in the final for his only title of the year. Querrey next played at the ATP Tour 500 event in Washington, where he lost to top seed Andy Roddick, in the round of 16. He also played at the Cincinnati Masters losing in the third round to Lleyton Hewitt. By reaching the quarterfinals in New Haven, he won the 2009 US Open Series, qualifying for the accompanying bonus following the 2009 US Open. Querrey reached the final in New Haven, before losing to Fernando Verdasco. In the 2009 US Open, Querrey lost in the third round to Robin Söderling in four sets.

Querrey's year was ended prematurely by a potentially career-threatening accident in which a glass table he was sitting on collapsed, impaling his arm and requiring emergency surgery; the location of injury just missed causing nerve damage, which could have ended his tennis career. Querrey finished the year ranked a career-high No. 25, and as the No. 2 American behind Andy Roddick.

=== 2010: First ATP 500 title ===
Although seeded at the Australian Open, Querrey lost in the first round to 2003 Australian Open finalist Rainer Schüttler. Querrey then reached the semifinals of the SAP Open, where he lost to Andy Roddick in singles. However, Querrey teamed with Mardy Fish to win the doubles title.

Querrey's next tournament was the 2010 Regions Morgan Keegan Championships, where he was seeded eighth. He defeated defending champion Roddick in the quarterfinals. He then defeated Ernests Gulbis in the semifinals, and defeated fellow American John Isner, for the championship. Querrey also teamed with Isner in the doubles, where they won the championship; Querrey became the first player to win the singles and doubles at Memphis simultaneously since 1981. At the Abierto Mexicano Telcel, he lost in the first round against Fernando González in three sets.

Querrey and Isner were selected to play singles for the United States Davis Cup Team against Serbia on indoor clay in March 2010. After losing to Novak Djokovic in four sets, Querrey managed to beat Viktor Troicki in straight sets in the unnecessary fifth match.

At the BNP Paribas Open, Querrey was seeded 17th and, after receiving a bye in the first round, then beat Jérémy Chardy in straight sets. In the third round, he was beaten by doubles partner John Isner in straight sets. At the Sony Ericsson Open, seeded 21st this time, after receiving a bye in the first round, he lost to Jérémy Chardy in three sets.

In April, he played at the U.S. Men's Clay Court Championships. After receiving a bye in the first round, he beat Blaž Kavčič in straight sets in the second round, and in the quarterfinal, beat Nicolás Massú in three sets. In the semifinals, he beat Wayne Odesnik to reach his eighth final on the ATP World Tour. He lost to Argentine Juan Ignacio Chela in the final.

He reached the doubles final with John Isner at the 2010 Rome Masters, but lost to Davis Cup teammates Bob and Mike Bryan.

Querrey played in the 2010 Serbia Open and progressed to the final, where he faced Davis Cup teammate John Isner. Querrey defeated Isner, for his second title of the year, and his first ATP title on clay.

At the 2010 French Open, Querrey was seeded 18th, but lost in the first round to fellow American Robby Ginepri in four sets. He withdrew from the doubles event, where he and Isner were the 12th seeds.

In the Queens Club in London, Querrey beat fellow American Mardy Fish in straight sets, in the final of the Aegon Championships. The victory made him the first American to win the tournament since Andy Roddick. The victory gave Querrey his third title of the season, making him the only player besides Rafael Nadal to win at least three titles, and made Querrey the first player in 2010 to win titles on three different surfaces. This was Querrey's first ATP tour title on grass.

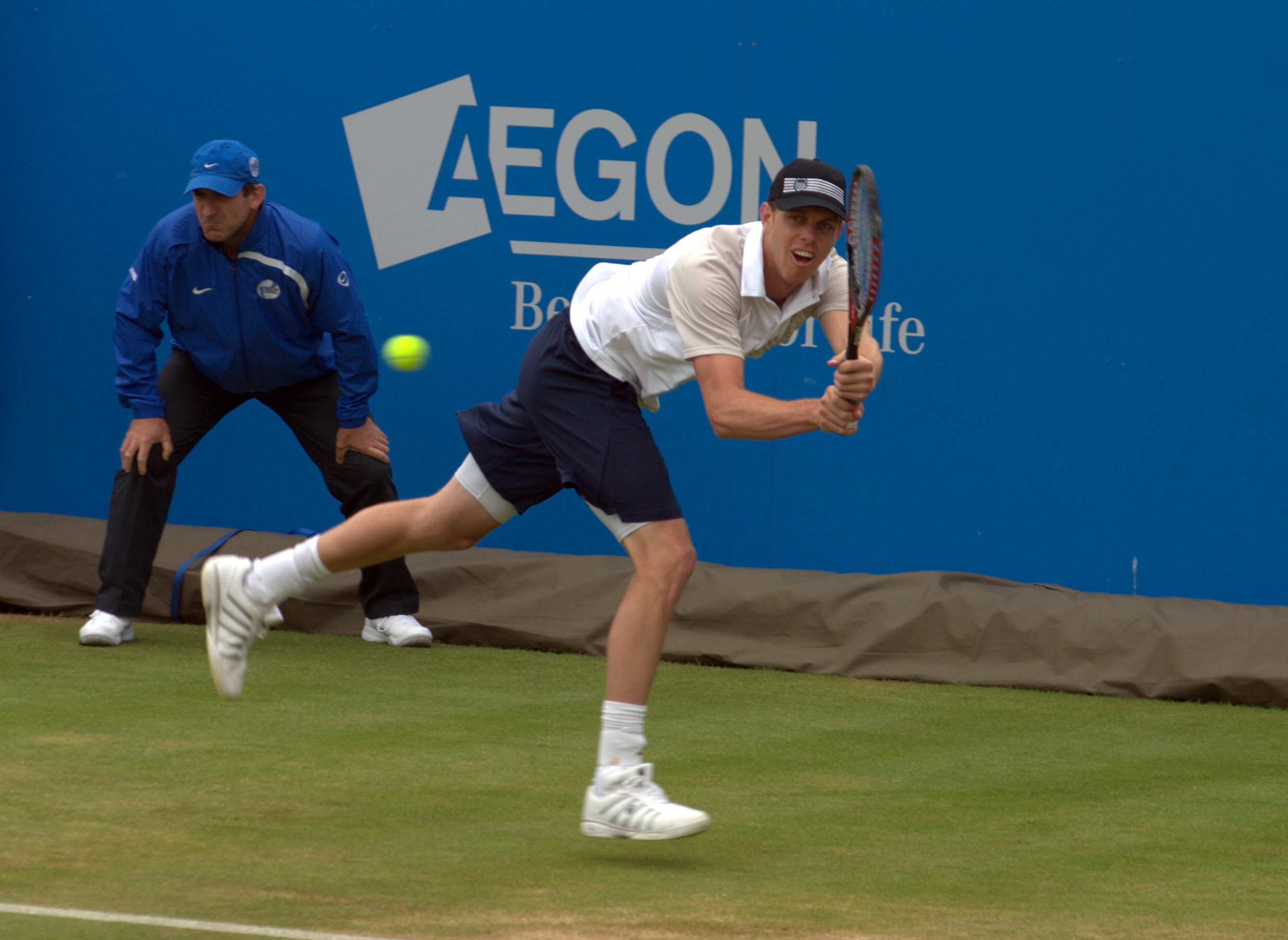
American Sam Querrey playing at the 2010 Queens Club Tennis Tournament.

Despite being ranked No. 21 in the world at the time, Querrey was seeded No. 18 at Wimbledon, due to his Queen's Club result. He was entered in the doubles with Isner, where they were the 12th seeds, but the partners agreed to forfeit after Isner played the longest tennis match in history. In the singles, Querrey defeated 2002 Wimbledon semifinalist Xavier Malisse in five sets to reach the fourth round of Wimbledon for the first time, where he lost to Andy Murray.

Querrey defended his title at the Farmers Classic in Los Angeles, winning a third-set tiebreaker in the quarterfinals against 2003 Australian Open finalist Rainer Schüttler, then defeating Janko Tipsarević in the semifinals, to reach his fifth final of the year. In the final, Querrey faced world No. 4 and 2010 Australian Open finalist Andy Murray. Querrey defeat Murray in the final. This was his first successful title defense, making him the first man since Andre Agassi to win two consecutive titles at this tournament.

Querrey next played in Washington, where he lost in the first round to Janko Tipsarević. During his time in Washington, he along with Bob and Mike Bryan conducted a tennis clinic for children, where they unexpectedly met president Barack Obama.

After early losses in the Canada Masters and the Cincinnati Masters, Querrey entered the 2010 US Open ranked No. 22 and seeded No. 20. He defeated Bradley Klahn in four sets, then defeated Marcel Granollers and 14th seed Nicolás Almagro in straight sets to reach the fourth round, tying his previous best result in any Grand Slam. In the fourth round, he lost to 25th seed Stanislas Wawrinka.

=== 2011: First masters doubles title ===
Querrey struggled with injury during this year. He reached the quarterfinals of two tournaments, both ATP 500 series. The first in Memphis in February, where he lost to Mardy Fish, and the second in Valencia, where he was beaten in straight sets by Juan Martín del Potro.

He was eliminated in the second round of the 2011 French Open by Ivan Ljubičić, and did not play at Wimbledon or the US Open, due to an elbow injury that required surgery.

=== 2012: Seventh ATP title ===
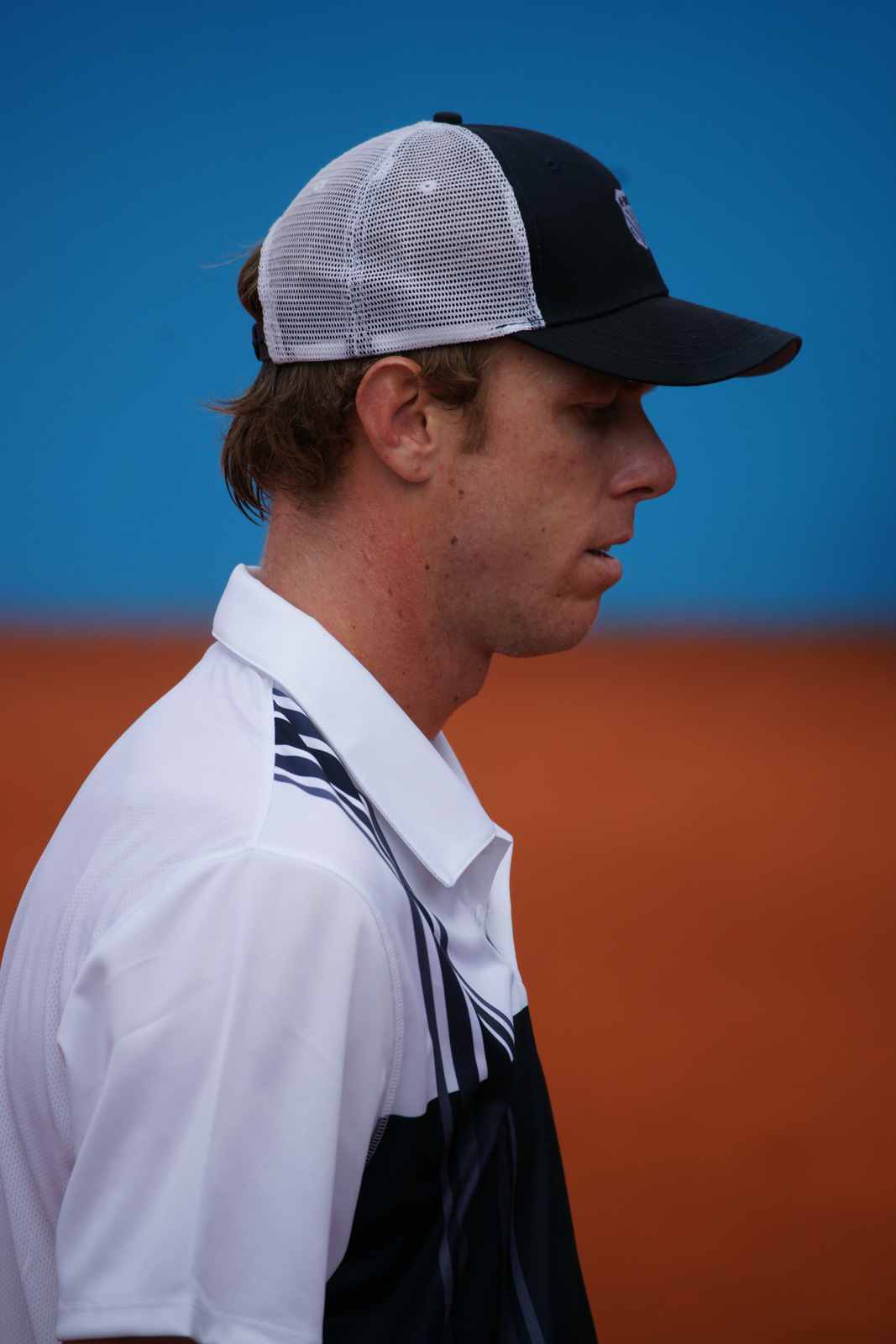
Querrey at the 2012 Nice Open

Ar the Australian Open, Querrey made it to the second round, where he was defeated by Bernard Tomic in four sets.

Querrey reached the semifinals of the Aegon Championships, losing to Marin Čilić. Querrey progressed to the third round of Wimbledon, only to once again lose to Čilić. This was the second-longest match played in Wimbledon history, clocking in at 5 hours and 31 minutes, second only to the Isner-Mahut match at the 2010 Wimbledon Championships (11 hours and 5 minutes over 3 days).

At the Farmers Classic, Querrey defeated Ričardas Berankis for his third Los Angeles title in four years. Querrey then went on to making the third round at the US Open, losing to Tomáš Berdych. At the BNP Paribas Masters, Querrey defeated Novak Djokovic in the second round.

=== 2013: 200 career wins ===
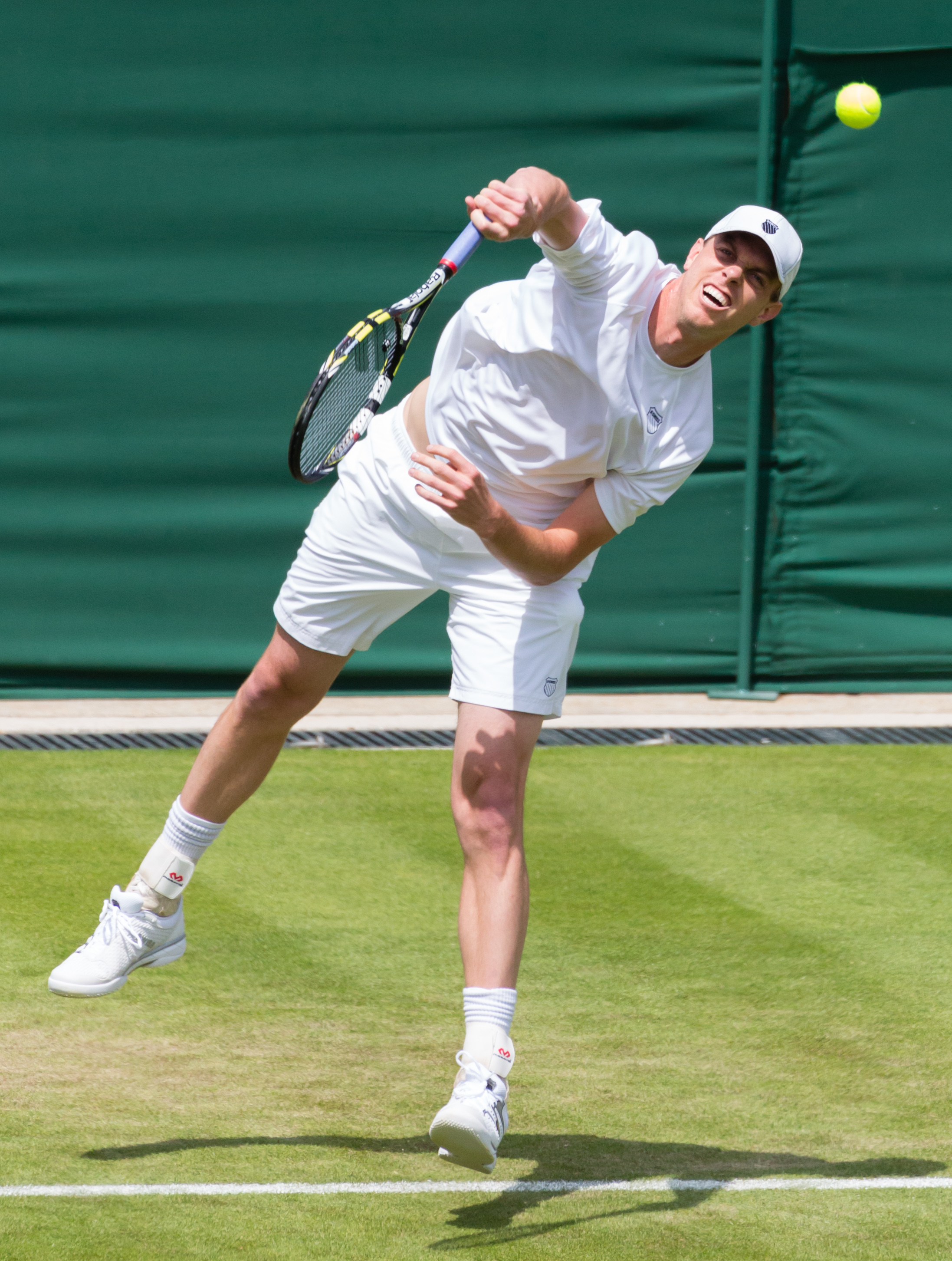
Querrey at the 2013 Wimbledon Championships

Early in the year, Querrey made the semi-finals in Auckland and San Jose. He exited in the fourth round of Indian Wells and Miami, losing to Novak Djokovic and Tomáš Berdych, respectively.

In Davis Cup competition in Boise, he won his first rubber against Viktor Troicki, but lost the deciding rubber against Djokovic, despite the fact that Djokovic suffered an ankle injury early in the match.

Querrey was eliminated in the first round in Madrid, Rome, and Wimbledon. He did not have a good summer on the North American hard-court swing and consequently slipped out of the top 20, ceding his place as top American player to his friend John Isner.

The year was not very successful, since Querrey failed to make a single final for the first time since 2011.

=== 2014: Australian Open third round, loss of form ===
Querrey also struggled early in 2014, being eliminated in the first round in Brisbane and Sydney. However, he made it to the third round of the Australian Open, defeating Santiago Giraldo and Ernests Gulbis, before succumbing to Fabio Fognini. He lost both of his ties in the Davis Cup against Great Britain in San Diego in January and was eliminated in the first round in Memphis and Delray Beach. He made it into the second round in Indian Wells and Miami, losing to Andreas Seppi and Nicolás Almagro, respectively. He had his best showing of the year thus far in Houston, where he made the semifinals of the clay-court event. However, there he again lost to Almagro.

Querrey failed to qualify in Rome and Nice, continuing his frustrating year. He also lost his first match in the second round in Nice to Albert Montañés. At the French Open, Sam defeated Filippo Volandri in the first round, but went down to Dmitry Tursunov in the second in straight sets. His form picked up at the Queen's Club grass tournament, where he defeated Jérémy Chardy and Denis Kudla in the first two rounds. He lost in the third round to eventual semifinalist Stanislas Wawrinka. Sam made it to the semifinals of the Aegon International in Eastbourne, England, but fell to eventual champion Feliciano López.

=== 2015: US Open mixed doubles runner-up ===
Querrey reached his first singles final for three years at the U.S. Men's Clay Court Championships, where he was beaten by compatriot Jack Sock. Querrey then reached the final of the Nottingham Open, where he lost to Uzbek Denis Istomin. Both Sock and Istomin were first-time ATP tour singles winners.

=== 2016: First Grand Slam quarterfinal ===
After failing to make it past the 2nd round of any tournament since July, Querrey started 2016 with a very strong run, reaching the semi-finals in Memphis, where he would lose to the eventual champion Kei Nishikori. The following week, Querrey reached the final at Delray Beach, where he defeated American Rajeev Ram to win his first ATP title since 2012 and return to the Top 50 of the world rankings.

At Wimbledon, Querrey faced Novak Djokovic in the 3rd round while his opponent was holding all four majors. Despite being listed as high as a 30–1 underdog, Querrey upset the world No. 1 player in four sets to snap Djokovic's streak of reaching at least the quarterfinals in every Grand Slam since the 2009 French Open, and his streak of 30 consecutive Grand Slam match wins. It was also Querrey's first win over a No. 1 ranked player. He then continued his successful run by defeating Nicolas Mahut to become the first American man to reach the quarterfinals of a Grand Slam since John Isner and Andy Roddick did so at the 2011 U.S. Open. In the quarterfinals, he lost to Canadian Milos Raonic in four sets. Despite this defeat, the 2016 Championships marked Querrey's best ever performance at a Grand Slam.

Querrey then entered the 2016 US Open but lost to Serbia's Janko Tipsarević in the first round. He also played doubles with fellow American Steve Johnson but lost to Italians Fabio Fognini & Andreas Seppi in the first round.

=== 2017: First Grand Slam semifinal, American No. 1 ===
Querrey opened 2017 in Brisbane where he fell in a Round of 32 match to Diego Schwartzman. He then won his first two matches in the first major of the season (Australian Open) before falling in straight sets to No. 1 Andy Murray. Returning to the US, he helped the US defeat Switzerland in the first round of the Davis Cup by winning his singles match against Adrien Bossel.

February saw Querrey compete in Memphis where he fell in his opening match to eventual champion Ryan Harrison. He then competed at Delray Beach where he fell in the quarterfinals to Juan Martín del Potro in straight sets. At the ATP Acapulco tournament he beat David Goffin, Dominic Thiem, and Nick Kyrgios, before defeating world No. 6 Rafael Nadal for his first career victory over the former world No. 1 player and his ninth career ATP singles title. At Wimbledon, Querrey defeated Murray in five sets to earn a spot in his first semi-final at Wimbledon. Querrey lost to Marin Čilić in the semifinals in 4 sets. Furthering his success in Mexico, he won the 2017 Los Cabos Open in August, defeating Thanasi Kokkinakis in the final.

At the 2017 US Open he became the first male American to reach the quarterfinals since Andy Roddick and John Isner both did so in 2011, at which he was defeated by Kevin Anderson.

To conclude his 2017 campaign, Querrey was named as an alternate in singles for the 2017 ATP Finals but did play.

=== 2018–2019: Masters 1000 quarterfinal, two finals, 350th match win ===
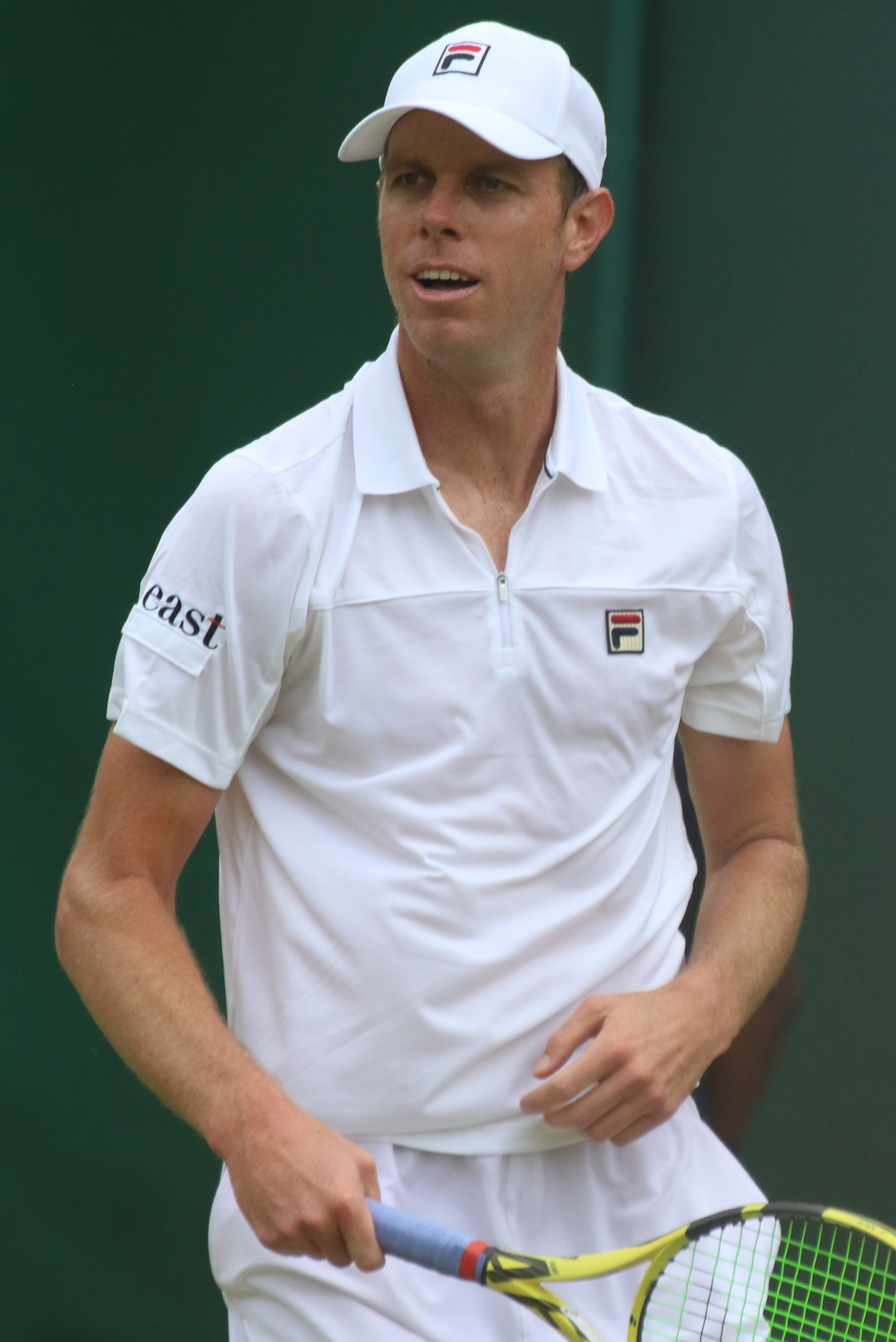
Querrey at the 2019 Wimbledon Championships

Querrey made the quarterfinals of the 2018 Indian Wells Masters and the finals of the 2018 New York Open and the 2019 Eastbourne International.

=== 2020–2021: Return to top doubles 100, out of top singles 100 ===
After an extended period of having struggles with form, not being able to pass the first round in a couple of Grand Slams since the 2020 Australian Open, Querrey found his form just before the start of the 2021 Wimbledon Championships, where he (unseeded) reached his 20th final, in the first edition of the Mallorca Championships with a 70-minute win against Frenchman Adrian Mannarino. He lost in the final to Daniil Medvedev.

At the 2021 US Open he reached the quarterfinals and semifinals in doubles partnering Steve Johnson as a wildcard pair. They were defeated in the semifinal by the eventual champions Rajeev Ram and Joe Salisbury. As a result, he reached No. 83 in doubles on September 13, 2021. He finished the year ranked outside the top 100 at No. 108.

=== 2022: Return to top 100, loss of form, out of top 250, retirement ===
At the 2022 Queen's Club Championships, Querrey reached the second round as a qualifier. As a result, he moved back into the top 100 on June 20, 2022. Following a first round exit at 2022 Wimbledon Championships and at the 2022 Hall of Fame Open in Newport, he dropped out of the top 250 in the rankings. He received a wildcard for the 2022 US Open.

On August 30, 2022, Querrey announced his retirement, playing his final matches in singles at the US Open, where he lost in the first round to Ilya Ivashka, and in doubles with good friend Steve Johnson, where they lost in the first round to Wesley Koolhof and Neal Skupski.

== Sam Querrey’s escape from Russia October 2020 ==
On October 2020 Querrey, his wife and infant son arrived at Russia, where he was suppose to play in the St. Petersburg Open. All three were tested positive for COVID-19. He withdrew from the tournament and agreed isolation at the tournament hotel. When understanding that the doctors might decide they should be hospitalized in isolation, he and his family left the tournament hotel at around 5:45 a.m. on October 13 and boarded a privately charted jet that flew them to London. They stayed there in an Airbnb for two weeks. He later revealed the private jet alone cost him $40,000. After an ATP investigation he was handed a suspended fine of $20,000, as long as he does not violate COVID-19 health and safety protocols during the next six months. He later explained his escape feeling he needed to protect his family.

== Playing style ==
Querrey is right-handed and used a doubled-handed backhand. He was regarded as one of the best servers on the tour.

== Equipment and sponsors ==
Querrey last played with the Babolat AeroPro Drive GT Racquet after switching from Prince. He wore Adidas apparel and shoes until the end of the 2009 season. At the start of the 2010 season, he changed his clothing sponsor to K-Swiss. In February 2012, Querrey announced that he will be joining the Babolat team and playing with their Aeropro Drive GT Plus racket.

His apparel and footwear were sponsored by Fila.

== Pickleball ==
Sam Querrey plays professional pickleball on the PPA Tour. He was first in the draft pick and is a member of the Atlanta Bouncers Major League Pickleball team.

He announced his retirement in December 2025.

== Broadcast career ==
Querrey works as a tennis commentator for ESPN. He started to commentate matches during the 2025 French Open.

== Personal life ==
Querrey's fan club, the "Samurai Club", was started by high school friends of his. They attend his matches shirtless with the letters "S-A-M-M-Y" on their chests.

Querrey married Abby Dixon, a model, on June 9, 2018, in Ft. Pierce, Florida.

In October 2020, Querrey tested positive for COVID-19. After leaving Russia during mandatory self-isolation, he was investigated by the ATP for a potential breach of health and safety protocols.

Querrey has also competed in professional pickleball and is a PPA ranked player.

He started a podcast "Nothing Major" in 2024 with his fellow retired American players John Isner, Steve Johnson, and Jack Sock.

== Grand Slam finals ==
=== Mixed doubles: 1 (1 runner-up) ===
Result	Year	Championship	Surface	Partner	Opponents	Score
Loss	2015	US Open	Hard	(United States) Bethanie Mattek-Sands	(Switzerland) Martina Hingis (India) Leander Paes	4–6, 6–3, [7–10]

== Masters 1000 finals ==
=== Doubles: 3 (1 title, 2 runners–up) ===
Result	Year	Tournament	Surface	Partner	Opponents	Score
Loss	2010	Italian Open	Clay	(United States) John Isner	(United States) Bob Bryan (United States) Mike Bryan	3–6, 2–6
Win	2011	Italian Open	Clay	(United States) John Isner	(United States) Mardy Fish (United States) Andy Roddick	w/o
Loss	2012	Indian Wells Masters	Hard	(United States) John Isner	(Spain) Marc López (Spain) Marcel Granollers	2–6, 6–7^{(3–7)}

== ATP career finals ==
=== Singles: 20 (10 titles, 10 runner-ups) ===
Legend Grand Slam tournaments (0–0) ATP World Tour Finals (0–0) ATP World Tour Masters 1000 (0–0) ATP World Tour 500 Series (2–0) ATP World Tour 250 Series (8–10)	Titles by surface Hard (8–4) Clay (1–2) Grass (1–4)	Titles by setting Outdoor (9–9) Indoor (1–1)

Result	W–L	Date	Tournament	Tier	Surface	Opponent	Score
Win	1–0	Mar 2008	Las Vegas Open, US	International	Hard	(South Africa) Kevin Anderson	4–6, 6–3, 6–4
Loss	1–1	Jan 2009	Auckland Open, New Zealand	250 Series	Hard	(Argentina) Juan Martín del Potro	4–6, 4–6
Loss	1–2	Jul 2009	Hall of Fame Tennis Championships, US	250 Series	Grass	(United States) Rajeev Ram	7–6^{(7–3)}, 5–7, 3–6
Loss	1–3	Jul 2009	Indianapolis Tennis Championships, US	250 Series	Hard	(United States) Robby Ginepri	2–6, 4–6
Win	2–3	Aug 2009	Los Angeles Open, US	250 Series	Hard	(Australia) Carsten Ball	6–4, 3–6, 6–1
Loss	2–4	Aug 2009	Connecticut Open, US	250 Series	Hard	(Spain) Fernando Verdasco	4–6, 6–7^{(6–8)}
Win	3–4	Feb 2010	Memphis Open, US	500 Series	Hard (i)	(United States) John Isner	6–7^{(3–7)}, 7–6^{(7–5)}, 6–3
Loss	3–5	Apr 2010	U.S. Men's Clay Court Championships, US	250 Series	Clay	(Argentina) Juan Ignacio Chela	7–5, 4–6, 3–6
Win	4–5	May 2010	Serbia Open, Serbia	250 Series	Clay	(United States) John Isner	3–6, 7–6^{(7–4)}, 6–4
Win	5–5	Jun 2010	Queen's Club Championships, UK	250 Series	Grass	(United States) Mardy Fish	7–6^{(7–3)}, 7–5
Win	6–5	Aug 2010	Los Angeles Open, US (2)	250 Series	Hard	(United Kingdom) Andy Murray	5–7, 7–6^{(7–2)}, 6–3
Win	7–5	Jul 2012	Los Angeles Open, US (3)	250 Series	Hard	(Lithuania) Ričardas Berankis	6–0, 6–2
Loss	7–6	Apr 2015	U.S. Men's Clay Court Championships, US	250 Series	Clay	(United States) Jack Sock	6–7^{(9–11)}, 6–7^{(2–7)}
Loss	7–7	Jun 2015	Nottingham Open, UK	250 Series	Grass	(Uzbekistan) Denis Istomin	6–7^{(1–7)}, 6–7^{(6–8)}
Win	8–7	Feb 2016	Delray Beach Open, US	250 Series	Hard	(United States) Rajeev Ram	6–4, 7–6^{(8–6)}
Win	9–7	Mar 2017	Mexican Open, Mexico	500 Series	Hard	(Spain) Rafael Nadal	6–3, 7–6^{(7–3)}
Win	10–7	Aug 2017	Los Cabos Open, Mexico	250 Series	Hard	(Australia) Thanasi Kokkinakis	6–3, 3–6, 6–2
Loss	10–8	Feb 2018	New York Open, US	250 Series	Hard (i)	(South Africa) Kevin Anderson	6–4, 3–6, 6–7^{(1–7)}
Loss	10–9	Jun 2019	Eastbourne International, UK	250 Series	Grass	(United States) Taylor Fritz	3–6, 4–6
Loss	10–10	Jun 2021	Mallorca Open, Spain	250 Series	Grass	(Russia) Daniil Medvedev	4–6, 2–6

=== Doubles: 13 (5 titles, 8 runner-ups) ===
Legend Grand Slam tournaments (0–0) ATP World Tour Finals (0–0) ATP World Tour Masters 1000 (1–2) ATP World Tour 500 Series (1–2) ATP World Tour 250 Series (3–4)	Titles by surface Hard (2–5) Clay (3–3) Grass (0–0)	Titles by setting Outdoor (4–5) Indoor (1–3)

Result	W–L	Date	Tournament	Tier	Surface	Partner	Opponents	Score
Win	1–0	Feb 2010	Pacific Coast Championships, US	250 Series	Hard (i)	(United States) Mardy Fish	(Germany) Benjamin Becker (Argentina) Leonardo Mayer	7–6^{(7–3)}, 7–5
Win	2–0	Feb 2010	U.S. National Indoor Tennis Championships, US	500 Series	Hard (i)	(United States) John Isner	(United Kingdom) Ross Hutchins (Australia) Jordan Kerr	6–4, 6–4
Loss	2–1	May 2010	Italian Open, Italy	Masters 1000	Clay	(United States) John Isner	(United States) Bob Bryan (United States) Mike Bryan	2–6, 3–6
Loss	2–2	Apr 2011	U.S. Men's Clay Court Championships, US	250 Series	Clay	(United States) John Isner	(United States) Bob Bryan (United States) Mike Bryan	7–6^{(7–4)}, 2–6, [5–10]
Win	3–2	May 2011	Italian Open, Italy	Masters 1000	Clay	(United States) John Isner	(United States) Mardy Fish (United States) Andy Roddick	Walkover
Loss	3–3	Mar 2012	Indian Wells Masters, US	Masters 1000	Hard	(United States) John Isner	(Spain) Marc López (Spain) Rafael Nadal	2–6, 6–7^{(3–7)}
Win	4–3	Apr 2012	U.S. Men's Clay Court Championships, US	250 Series	Clay	(United States) James Blake	(Philippines) Treat Huey (United Kingdom) Dominic Inglot	7–6^{(16–14)}, 6–4
Loss	4–4	Aug 2012	Washington Open, US	500 Series	Hard	(South Africa) Kevin Anderson	(Philippines) Treat Huey (United Kingdom) Dominic Inglot	6–7^{(7–9)}, 7–6^{(11–9)}, [5–10]
Loss	4–5	Jul 2014	Atlanta Open, US	250 Series	Clay	(United States) Steve Johnson	(Canada) Vasek Pospisil (United States) Jack Sock	3–6, 7–5, [5–10]
Loss	4–6	Feb 2016	Memphis Open, US	250 Series	Hard (i)	(United States) Steve Johnson	(Poland) Mariusz Fyrstenberg (Mexico) Santiago González	4–6, 4–6
Win	5–6	May 2016	Geneva Open, Switzerland	250 Series	Clay	(United States) Steve Johnson	(South Africa) Raven Klaasen (United States) Rajeev Ram	6–4, 6–1
Loss	5–7	Jan 2017	Brisbane International, Australia	250 Series	Hard	(Luxembourg) Gilles Müller	(Australia) Thanasi Kokkinakis (Australia) Jordan Thompson	6–7^{(7–9)}, 4–6
Loss	5–8	Oct 2017	Vienna Open, Austria	500 Series	Hard (i)	(Brazil) Marcelo Demoliner	(India) Rohan Bopanna (Uruguay) Pablo Cuevas	6–7^{(7–9)}, 7–6^{(7–4)}, [9–11]

== Performance timelines ==
Key
W	F	SF	QF	#R	RR	Q#	P#	DNQ	A	Z#	PO	G	S	B	NMS	NTI	P	NH

(W) winner; (F) finalist; (SF) semifinalist; (QF) quarterfinalist; (#R) rounds 4, 3, 2, 1; (RR) round-robin stage; (Q#) qualification round; (P#) preliminary round; (DNQ) did not qualify; (A) absent; (Z#) Davis/Fed Cup Zonal Group (with number indication) or (PO) play-off; (G) gold, (S) silver or (B) bronze Olympic/Paralympic medal; (NMS) not a Masters tournament; (NTI) not a Tier I tournament; (P) postponed; (NH) not held; (SR) strike rate (events won / competed); (W–L) win–loss record.
To avoid confusion and double counting, these charts are updated at the conclusion of a tournament or when the player's participation has ended.

=== Singles ===
Tournament	2005	2006	2007	2008	2009	2010	2011	2012	2013	2014	2015	2016	2017	2018	2019	2020	2021	2022	SR	W–L	Win %
Grand Slam tournaments
Australian Open	A	A	3R	3R	1R	1R	1R	2R	3R	3R	1R	1R	3R	2R	1R	3R	1R	1R	0 / 16	14–16	47%
French Open	A	A	1R	1R	1R	1R	2R	1R	3R	2R	1R	1R	1R	2R	A	1R	1R	Q1	0 / 14	5–14	26%
Wimbledon	A	A	1R	1R	2R	4R	A	3R	1R	2R	2R	QF	SF	3R	QF	NH	2R	1R	0 / 14	24–14	63%
US Open	Q1	2R	1R	4R	3R	4R	A	3R	2R	3R	1R	1R	QF	1R	1R	1R	1R	1R	0 / 16	18–16	53%
Win–loss	0–0	1–1	2–4	5–4	3–4	6–4	1–2	5–4	5–4	6–4	1–4	4–4	11–4	4–4	4–3	2–3	1–4	0–3	0 / 60	61–60	50%
Year-end championships
ATP Finals	Did not qualify												Alt	Did not qualify					0 / 0	0–0	–
ATP World Tour Masters 1000
Indian Wells Masters	A	2R	2R	2R	3R	3R	4R	2R	4R	2R	1R	3R	2R	QF	2R	NH	1R	2R	0 / 16	18–16	53%
Miami Open	A	1R	2R	2R	2R	2R	3R	2R	4R	2R	2R	2R	3R	3R	1R	NH	1R	Q1	0 / 15	10–15	40%
Monte-Carlo Masters	A	A	A	QF	A	A	A	A	A	A	A	A	A	A	A	NH	A	A	0 / 1	3–1	75%
Madrid Open	A	A	A	A	2R	1R	1R	A	1R	A	2R	3R	A	A	A	NH	A	A	0 / 6	4–6	40%
Italian Open	A	A	A	A	1R	1R	2R	2R	1R	Q2	1R	1R	3R	1R	A	1R	A	A	0 / 10	4–10	29%
Canadian Open	A	A	A	1R	1R	2R	A	3R	A	A	2R	2R	3R	2R	A	NH	A	A	0 / 8	8–8	50%
Cincinnati Masters	A	1R	QF	2R	3R	2R	A	2R	1R	2R	2R	1R	2R	2R	A	1R	A	A	0 / 13	12–13	48%
Shanghai Masters	NMS				A	2R	A	3R	1R	A	1R	1R	3R	3R	1R	NH			0 / 7	7–8	47%
Paris Masters	A	A	1R	2R	A	1R	Q2	QF	A	2R	A	A	1R	Q1	1R	A	A	A	0 / 6	5–7	42%
Win–loss	0–0	1–3	5–4	7–6	6–6	4–8	4–4	11–7	3–6	4–4	4–7	4–7	8–7	8–6	1–3	0–2	0–2	1–1	0 / 82	71–82	46%
National representation
Summer Olympics	Not Held			1R	Not Held			A	Not Held			A	Not Held				A	NH	0 / 1	0–1	0%
Davis Cup	A	A	A	SF	A	1R	A	SF	QF	1R	PO	A	QF	SF	RR	NH	A	A	0 / 7	12–9	57%
Career statistics
	2005	2006	2007	2008	2009	2010	2011	2012	2013	2014	2015	2016	2017	2018	2019	2020	2021	2022	Career		
Tournaments	0	11	22	25	23	25	13	25	21	20	24	24	22	22	17	6	16	10	326		
Titles	0	0	0	1	1	4	0	1	0	0	0	1	2	0	0	0	0	0	10		
Finals	0	0	0	1	5	5	0	1	0	0	2	1	2	1	1	0	1	0	20		
Overall win–loss	0–0	6–11	19–22	28–26	41–23	39–24	12–15	37–25	27–22	28–21	20–24	28–23	36–23	24–22	24–18	3–6	9–16	4–10	385–330		
Year-end ranking	615	130	63	39	25	18	93	22	46	35	59	31	13	51	44	53	108	329	53.85%		

=== Doubles ===
Tournament	2005	2006	2007	2008	2009	2010	2011	2012	2013	2014	2015	2016	2017	2018	2019	2020	2021	2022	SR	W–L	Win %
Grand Slam tournaments
Australian Open	A	A	A	1R	1R	3R	A	A	A	1R	1R	2R	3R	2R	SF	3R	1R	2R	0 / 11	13–12	52%
French Open	A	A	1R	3R	1R	A	1R	A	A	1R	2R	A	2R	1R	A	1R	1R	A	0 / 10	4–10	29%
Wimbledon	A	A	A	1R	2R	A	A	1R	A	A	2R	1R	1R	A	A	NH	A	1R	0 / 7	2–7	22%
US Open	1R	1R	QF	1R	2R	A	A	1R	1R	1R	SF	1R	A	A	1R	A	SF	1R	0 / 12	12–13	48%
Win–loss	0–1	0–1	3–2	2–4	2–4	2–1	0–1	0–2	0–1	0–3	6–4	1–3	3–3	1–2	4–2	2–2	4–3	1–3	0 / 41	31–41	43%
ATP World Tour Masters 1000
Indian Wells Masters	A	A	A	1R	A	SF	2R	F	2R	SF	2R	1R	SF	QF	1R	NH	2R	A	0 / 12	19–12	61%
Miami Open	A	A	2R	1R	A	2R	2R	1R	1R	A	SF	1R	2R	SF	QF	NH	1R	A	0 /12	12–12	52%
Monte-Carlo Masters	A	A	A	A	A	A	A	A	A	A	A	A	A	A	A	NH	A	A	0 / 0	0–0	–
Madrid Masters	A	A	A	A	A	2R	SF	A	2R	A	1R	1R	A	A	A	NH	A	A	0 / 5	5–5	50%
Italian Open	A	A	A	A	A	F	W	1R	1R	A	1R	2R	1R	2R	A	A	A	A	1 / 8	10–7	59%
Canadian Open	A	A	A	A	A	A	A	A	A	A	A	1R	A	QF	A	NH	A	A	0 / 2	2–2	50%
Cincinnati Masters	A	A	1R	1R	2R	2R	A	2R	A	SF	2R	1R	A	2R	A	2R	A	A	0 / 10	8–8	53%
Shanghai Masters	NMS				A	1R	A	2R	A	A	2R	1R	A	A	2R	NH			0 / 5	3–5	29%
Paris Masters	A	A	A	A	A	2R	A	1R	A	1R	A	A	1R	A	A	A	A	A	0 / 4	1–3	25%
Win–loss	0–0	0–0	1–2	0–3	1–1	11–6	9–3	6–6	2–4	6–2	6–6	1–6	4–4	9–5	3–3	0–1	1–2	0–0	1 / 57	60–54	53%
Career statistics
	2005	2006	2007	2008	2009	2010	2011	2012	2013	2014	2015	2016	2017	2018	2019	2020	2021	2022	Career		
Titles	0	0	0	0	0	2	1	1	0	0	0	1	0	0	0	0	0	0	5		
Finals	0	0	0	0	0	3	2	3	0	1	0	2	2	0	0	0	0	0	13		
Overall win–loss	0–1	0–4	7–10	5–17	7–13	23–14	14–8	19–17	6–10	12–10	18–16	13–15	16–16	13–10	8–7	2–3	11–11	3–6	177–188		
Year-end ranking	1414	838	110	205	152	30	38	45	216	64	38	97	57	72	79	179	79	327	48.49%		

== Wins over top-10 players ==
- He had a 23–66 record against players who were, at the time the match was played, ranked in the top 10.

Season	2006	2007	2008	2009	2010	2011	2012	2013	2014	2015	2016	2017	2018	2019	2020	2021	2022	Total
Wins	0	2	1	3	2	2	1	1	0	0	2	4	2	2	0	1	0	23

#	Player	Rk	Event	Surface	Rd	Score	SQR
2007
1.	(United States) James Blake	10	Indianapolis, United States	Hard	QF	7–6^{(8–6)}, 6–7^{(4–7)}, 7–6^{(7–4)}	90
2.	(Russia) Mikhail Youzhny	10	Cincinnati, United States	Hard	2R	5–7, 6–3, 6–4	65
2008
3.	(France) Richard Gasquet	9	Monte Carlo, Monaco	Clay	3R	2–6, 6–4, 6–3	50
2009
4.	(France) Gilles Simon	7	World Team Cup, Düsseldorf, Germany	Clay	RR	7–5, 6–3	56
5.	(United States) Andy Roddick	5	Cincinnati, United States	Hard	2R	7–6^{(13–11)}, 7–6^{(7–3)}	26
6.	(Russia) Nikolay Davydenko	8	New Haven, United States	Hard	QF	6–3, 3–6, 6–4	23
2010
7.	(United States) Andy Roddick	7	Memphis, United States	Hard (i)	QF	7–5, 3–6, 6–1	31
8.	(United Kingdom) Andy Murray	4	Los Angeles, United States	Hard	F	5–7, 7–6^{(7–2)}, 6–3	20
2011
9.	(Spain) Fernando Verdasco	9	Indian Wells, United States	Hard	3R	7–5, 6–4	24
10.	(France) Jo-Wilfried Tsonga	8	Valencia, Spain	Hard (i)	2R	7–6^{(7–5)}, 6–2	116
2012
11.	(Serbia) Novak Djokovic	2	Paris, France	Hard (i)	2R	0–6, 7–6^{(7–5)}, 6–4	23
2013
12.	(Switzerland) Stan Wawrinka	9	Beijing, China	Hard	2R	6–3, 7–6^{(7–2)}	30
2016
13.	(Japan) Kei Nishikori	6	Acapulco, Mexico	Hard	2R	6–4, 6–3	43
14.	(Serbia) Novak Djokovic	1	Wimbledon, London, United Kingdom	Grass	3R	7–6^{(8–6)}, 6–1, 3–6, 7–6^{(7–5)}	41
2017
15.	(Austria) Dominic Thiem	9	Acapulco, Mexico	Hard	QF	6–1, 7–5	40
16.	(Spain) Rafael Nadal	6	Acapulco, Mexico	Hard	F	6–3, 7–6^{(7–3)}	40
17.	(France) Jo-Wilfried Tsonga	10	Wimbledon, London, United Kingdom	Grass	3R	6–2, 3–6, 7–6^{(7–5)}, 1–6, 7–5	28
18.	(United Kingdom) Andy Murray	1	Wimbledon, London, United Kingdom	Grass	QF	3–6, 6–4, 6–7^{(4–7)}, 6–1, 6–1	28
2018
19.	(United States) John Isner	9	Cincinnati, United States	Hard	1R	6–4, 6–7^{(5–7)}, 7–6^{(7–5)}	34
20.	(Croatia) Marin Čilić	6	Davis Cup, Zadar, Croatia	Clay	SF	6–7^{(2–7)}, 7–6^{(8–6)},6–3, 6–4	61
2019
21.	(Austria) Dominic Thiem	4	Wimbledon, London, United Kingdom	Grass	1R	6–7^{(4–7)}, 7–6^{(7–1)}, 6–3, 6–0	65
22.	(Spain) Roberto Bautista Agut	10	Beijing, China	Hard	1R	7–6^{(7–2)}, 4–1 ret.	55
2021
23.	(Spain) Roberto Bautista Agut	10	Santa Ponsa, Spain	Grass	QF	6–3, 7–6^{(7–4)}	60

== World TeamTennis ==
Querrey played seven seasons of World TeamTennis, making his debut in 2009 with the St. Louis Aces. He then played for the Sacramento Capitals in 2012 and 2013, the Washington Kastles in 2015 and 2017, the Orange County Breakers in 2018, and the Vegas Rollers for their inaugural season in 2019. He has one WTT Championship from his time with the Kastles in 2015. Querrey played with the Vegas Rollers during the 2020 WTT season.

Sporting positions
Preceded by (Spain) Rafael Nadal	US Open Series Champion; 2009	Succeeded by (United Kingdom) Andy Murray
