= Racquet Club of Memphis =

Tennis club in Memphis, Tennessee

Coordinates: 35.116442°N 89.89006°W

The Racquet Club of Memphis was a private tennis club in Memphis, Tennessee, United States. The club was formed in 1974 as an expansion of the Memphis Athletic Club. An ATP Tour tournament, later called the Regions Morgan Keegan Championships came to the club in 1976 and was given an elevated "500" status in 2008. The increased status brought higher caliber players, a higher prize package and more points to the players. The change took effect in 2009. A 5,000-seat stadium was constructed in 1984. The club features 27 total courts: 11 indoor and 16 outdoor. During its later years, the ATP tournament was joined by a WTA Tour event, the Cellular South Cup. The final tournament played at the club was in 2017.

In 2008, Golden Set Holdings LLC and San Jose, California-based Silicon Valley Sports & Entertainment (now Sharks Sports and Entertainment) purchased the Racquet Club, the Regions Morgan Keegan Championships and Cellular South Cup from the previous owner, Mac Winker, and renovated. In 2009, The Racquet Club of Memphis officially became the home for men's and women's tennis at the University of Memphis.

In November 2018, the ownership group of the Racquet Club sent a letter to its members, announcing the facility's closure:

"While the Club has continued to attract committed, high level players, their numbers have declined while the options for local play have increased, and there is no longer a Tournament in place. In this context, the Club’s business model is not sustainable given the needed capital expenditures and prospect of operating losses. We are pursuing another use of The Racquet Club property that can make this twelve-acre site once again special for Memphis."

The Racquet Club continued operating until the spring of 2019, when the University of Memphis' tennis teams completed their schedule, and the club closed weeks after.

== See also ==
- List of tennis stadiums by capacity
