= U.S. National Indoor Championships =

Tennis tournament

Coordinates: 35.116°N 89.890°W

Defunct tennis tournament
- Founded: 1898
- Abolished: 2014
- Location: 1898 Newton Centre, MA; 1900–1963 New York, NY; 1964–1976 Salisbury, MD; 1977–2014 Memphis, TN; United States
- Venue: 1898 Winter Lawn Tennis Club; 1900–1963 Seventh Regiment Armory; 1941 Oklahoma Coliseum; 1964–1976 Wicomico Youth and Civic Center; 1977–2014 Racquet Club of Memphis,
- Surface: Hard / indoors
ATP Tour
- Category: 500 series (until 2013); 250 series (in 2014)
WTA Tour
- Category: WTA Category 1+ (1987), WTA Category 2 (1988–1989), WTA Tier IV (1990–1992), WTA Tier III (1993–2008), WTA International (2009–2013)

The U.S. National Indoor Championships was a tennis tournament that was last held at the Racquet Club of Memphis in Memphis, Tennessee, United States. Also known as the U.S. International Indoor Championships. The event was played on indoor hard courts and usually took place in February. For much of its more than 100-year history it was a combined men's and women's tournament but in 2014, its final year, only a men's tournament was held. The event was previously known under various sponsored names including the Memphis Open, the Regions Morgan Keegan Championships, the Kroger St. Jude Championship, and the Volvo Championships. It was called throughout most of its history the National Indoor Championships.

== History ==
The tournament began in March 1898 when the inaugural edition was played at the Newton Winter Tennis Club in Newton Centre. The men's singles was the only event played and was won by Leo Ware who defeated Holcombe Ward in the final in straight sets. There was no tournament held in 1899.

In 1900 a men's doubles event was added and the tournament moved to the Seventh Regiment Armory in Manhattan, New York, where it was played on a wood court until 1963 with the exception of 1941 (Coliseum in Oklahoma City) and from 1942 until 1945 when no tournament was held due to World War II.

When the Seventh Regiment Armory was closed for renovations a new venue for the tournament had to be selected by the USLTA. In 1964 the tournament moved to Salisbury, Maryland, and was organized by Jimmy Connors' manager Bill Riordan.

The last move occurred after the 1976 tournament, when Memphis became the host of the event and was the location of the tournament until its end in 2014. The men's tournament was part of the Grand Prix tennis circuit between 1976 and 1989 before becoming an ATP Tour event.

The 2013 tournament was the last combined men's and women's tournament and was held February 16–24, 2013, at The Racquet Club of Memphis. Marina Erakovic was the last woman to win the title. In 2014 the WTA event moved to Rio de Janeiro. The men's tournament lost its ATP World Tour 500 series certification, which also moved to Rio de Janeiro, but continued as an ATP 250 event known as the Memphis Open, taking over the ATP 250 sanction from the SAP Open in San Jose.

== Men's finals ==
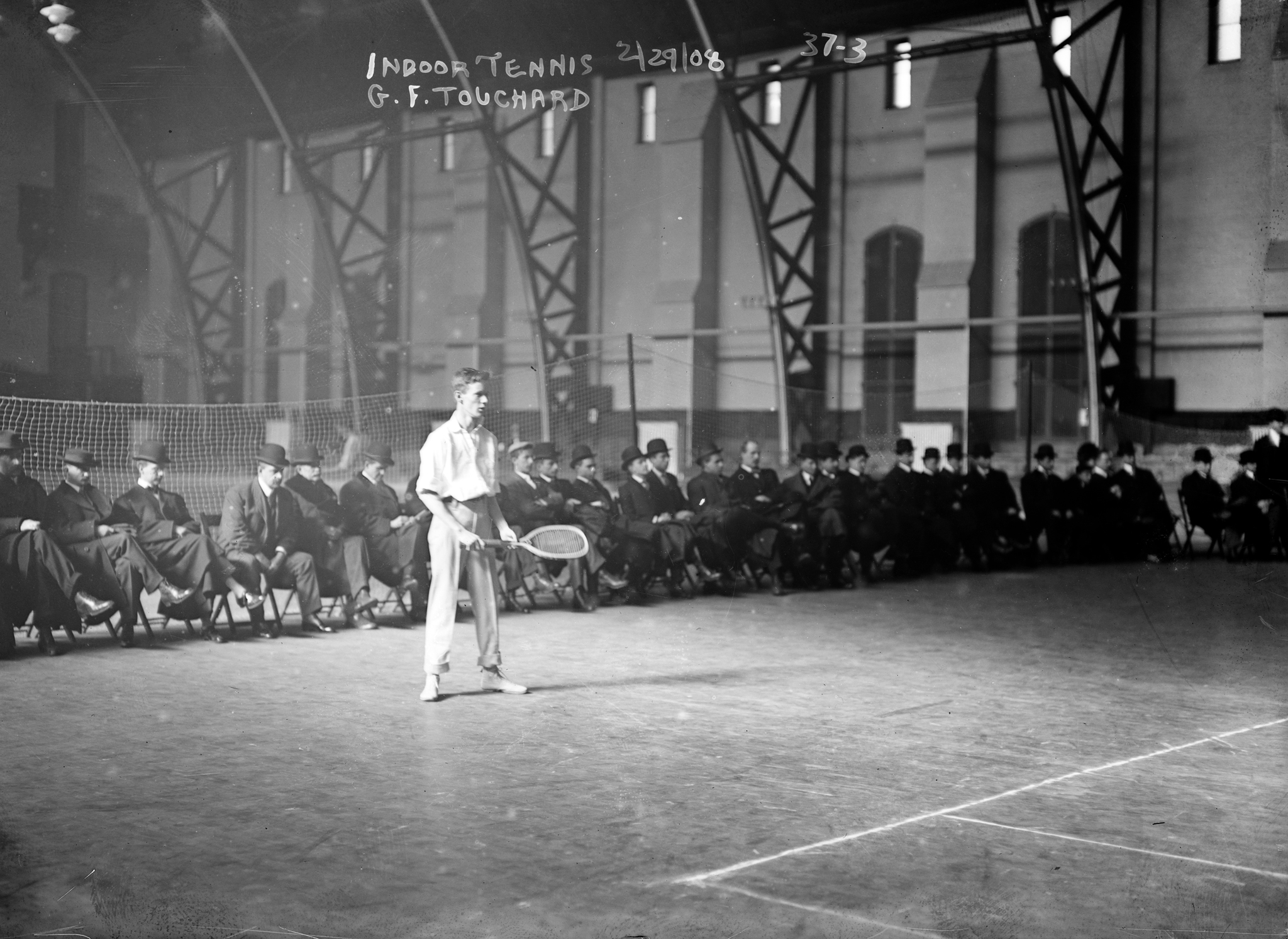
Gustave F. Touchard at the 1908 U.S. National Indoor Tennis Championships played in the Seventh Regiment Armory in New York

=== Singles ===
Location	Year	Champions	Runners-up	Score
Newton Center	1898	(United States) Leo Ware	(United States) Holcombe Ward	7–5, 7–5, 6–1
Newton Center	1899	Not held		
New York	1900	(United States) John A. Allen	(United States) Calhoun Cragin	6–1, 1–6, 6–4, 6–3
New York	1901	(United States) Holcombe Ward	(United States) Calhoun Cragin	11–9, 6–2, 6–3
New York	1902	(United States) J. Parmly Paret	(United States) Wylie Grant	4–6, 9–7, 1–6, 8–6, 6–4
New York	1903	(United States) Wylie Grant	(United States) Calhoun Cragin	6–3, 6–4, 6–1
New York	1904	(United States) Wylie Grant	(United States) C. Carleton Kelly	8–6, 6–3, 5–7, 6–8, 7–5
New York	1905	(Australia) Edward Dewhurst	(United States) Wylie Grant	6–3, 8–6, 6–4
New York	1906	(United States) Wylie Grant	(United States) Edwin Fischer	6–4, 6–2, 8–6
New York	1907	(United States) Theodore Pell	(United States) Wylie Grant	3–6, 6–3, 6–2, 1–6, 6–0
New York	1908	(United States) Wylie Grant	(United States) Gustave Touchard	6–4, 3–6, 6–2, 6–4
New York	1909	(United States) Theodore Pell	(United States) George C Shafer	6–3, 6–3, 6–4
New York	1910	(United States) Gustave Touchard	(United States) Reuben A. Holden III	6–1, 3–6, 7–9, 6–1, 6–4
New York	1911	(United States) Theodore Pell	(United States) William Cragin	6–2, 6–3, 6–4
New York	1912	(United States) Wylie Grant	(United States) William Cragin	6–1, 6–3, 6–3.
New York	1913	(United States) Gustave Touchard	(United States) George C Shafer	6–4, 3–6, 6–3, 6–4
New York	1914	(United States) Gustave Touchard	(United States) William Rosenbaum	6–2, 6–2, 4–6, 6–2
New York	1915	(United States) Gustave Touchard	(United States) Arthur M. Lovibond	6–3, 6–2, 3–6, 6–2
New York	1916	(United States) Robert Lindley Murray	(United States) Aldrick Man	6–2, 6–2, 7–5
New York	1917	(United States) S. Howard Voshell	(United States) Clifton Herd	7–5, 6–3, 6–3
New York	1918	(United States) S. Howard Voshell	(United States) Fred Alexander	7–5, 6–2, 8–6
New York	1919	(United States) Vincent Richards	(United States) Bill Tilden	3–6, 8–6, 6–8, 6–1, 6–4
New York	1920	(United States) Bill Tilden	(United States) Vincent Richards	10–8, 6–3, 6–1
New York	1921	(United States) Frank Anderson	(United States) Fred Anderson	6–2, 6–1, 6–3
New York	1922	(United States) Frank Hunter	(United States) Frank Anderson	6–4, 1–6, 7–5, 6–2
New York	1923	(United States) Vincent Richards	(United States) Frank Hunter	6–1, 6–3, 7–5
New York	1924	(United States) Vincent Richards	(United States) Frank Hunter	8–6, 6–2, 3–6, 6–3
New York	1925	(France) Jean Borotra	(United States) Fred Anderson	3–6, 6–3, 6–4, 6–0
New York	1926	(France) René Lacoste	(France) Jean Borotra	15–13, 6–3, 2–6, 6–2
New York	1927	(France) Jean Borotra	(France) Jacques Brugnon	6–2, 6–4, 6–3
New York	1928	(United States) William Aydelotte	(United States) Julius Seligson	2–6, 6–1, 3–6, 6–4, 6–2
New York	1929	(France) Jean Borotra	(United States) Frank Hunter	6–4, 6–0, 4–6, 8–6
New York	1930	(United States) Frank Hunter	(United States) Julius Seligson	6–3, 6–2, 6–2
New York	1931	(France) Jean Borotra	(United States) Berkeley Bell	6–1, 3–6, 6–4, 3–6, 6–4
New York	1932	(United States) Gregory Mangin	(United States) Frank Shields	10–8, 2–6, 6–4, 6–3
New York	1933	(United States) Gregory Mangin	(United States) Cliff Sutter	6–1, 6–3, 2–6, 3–6, 6–2
New York	1934	(United States) Lester Stoefen	(United States) Gregory Mangin	6–1, 8–6, 6–4
New York	1935	(United States) Gregory Mangin	(United States) Berkeley Bell	8–6, 7–5, 2–6, 0–6, 6–2
New York	1936	(United States) Gregory Mangin	(United States) Leonard Hartman	6–1, 6–3, 4–6, 6–3
New York	1937	(United States) Frank Parker	(United States) Frank Bowden	6–4, 6–4, 1–6, 4–6, 6–1
New York	1938	(United States) Don McNeill	(United States) Frank Bowden	9–7, 3–6, 6–4, 7–5
New York	1939	(United States) Wayne Sabin	(United States) Frank Bowden	6–3, 5–7, 6–3, 6–1
New York	1940	(United States) Bobby Riggs	(United States) Don McNeill	3–6, 6–1, 6–4, 2–6, 6–2
Oklahoma City	1941	(United States) Frank Kovacs	(United States) Wayne Sabin	6–0, 6–4, 6–2
Oklahoma City	1942 – 1945	No competition (due to WWII)		
New York	1946	(Ecuador) Pancho Segura	(United States) Don McNeill	1–6, 6–3, 6–4, 7–5
New York	1947	(United States) Jack Kramer	(United States) Bob Falkenburg	6–1, 6–2, 6–2
New York	1948	(United States) Bill Talbert	(United States) Sidney Schwartz	4–6, 8–6, 9–7, 6–2
New York	1949	(United States) Pancho Gonzales	(United States) Bill Talbert	10–8, 6–0, 4–6, 9–7
New York	1950	(United States) Don McNeill	(United States) Fred Kovaleski	11–9, 4–6, 6–2, 6–2
New York	1951	(United States) Bill Talbert	(United States) Straight Clark	6–4, 6–8, 3–6, 6–2, 6–3
New York	1952	(United States) Dick Savitt	(United States) Bill Talbert	6–4, 6–3, 6–4
New York	1953	(United States) Art Larsen	(Denmark) Kurt Nielsen	5–7, 6–4, 6–3, 6–3
New York	1954	(Sweden) Sven Davidson	(Denmark) Kurt Nielsen	3–6, 6–1, 6–1, 6–4
New York	1955	(United States) Tony Trabert	(United States) Ham Richardson	11–13, 7–5, 9–7, 6–3
New York	1956	(Sweden) Ulf Schmidt	(Sweden) Sven Davidson	6–1, 6–3, 8–10, 6–3
New York	1957	(Denmark) Kurt Nielsen	(United States) Herbie Flam	4–6, 6–1, 6–4, 6–4
New York	1958	(United States) Dick Savitt	(United States) Budge Patty	6–1, 6–2, 3–6, 12–10
New York	1959	(United States) Alex Olmedo	(United States) Dick Savitt	7–9, 6–3, 4–6, 5–7, 12–10
New York	1960	(United States) Barry MacKay (tennis)	(United States) Dick Savitt	6–2, 2–6, 10–12, 6–1, 6–4
New York	1961	(United States) Dick Savitt	(United States) Whitney Reed	6–2, 11–9, 6–3
New York	1962	(United States) Chuck McKinley	(United States) Whitney Reed	4–6, 6–3, 4–6, 9–7, 10–8
New York	1963	(United States) Dennis Ralston	(United Kingdom) Mike Sangster	7–5, 4–6, 6–3, 10–8
Salisbury	1964	(United States) Chuck McKinley	(United States) Dennis Ralston	15–13, 6–2, 6–8, 3–6, 6–3
Salisbury	1965	(Sweden) Jan-Erik Lundqvist	(United States) Dennis Ralston	4–6, 13–11, 6–4, 11–9
Salisbury	1966	(United States) Charlie Pasarell	(United States) Ron Holmberg	12–10, 10–8, 8–6
Salisbury	1967	(United States) Charlie Pasarell	(United States) Arthur Ashe	13–11, 6–2, 2–6, 9–7
Salisbury	1968	(United States) Cliff Richey	(United States) Clark Graebner	6–4, 6–4, 6–4
Salisbury	↓ Open Era ↓			
Salisbury	1969	(United States) Stan Smith	(United Arab Republic) Ismail El Shafei	6–3, 6–8, 6–4, 6–4
Salisbury	1970	(Romania) Ilie Năstase	(United States) Cliff Richey	6–8, 3–6, 6–4, 9–7, 6–0
Salisbury	1971	(United States) Clark Graebner	(United States) Cliff Richey	2–6, 7–6, 1–6, 7–6, 6–0
Salisbury	1972	(United States) Stan Smith	(Romania) Ilie Năstase	5–7, 6–2, 6–3, 6–4
Salisbury	1973	(United States) Jimmy Connors	(West Germany) Karl Meiler	3–6, 7–6, 7–6, 6–3
Salisbury	1974	(United States) Jimmy Connors	(South Africa) Frew McMillan	6–4, 7–5, 6–3
Salisbury	1975	(United States) Jimmy Connors	(United States) Vitas Gerulaitis	5–7, 7–5, 6–1, 3–6, 6–0
Salisbury	1976	(Romania) Ilie Năstase	(United States) Jimmy Connors	6–2, 6–3, 7–6^{(9–7)}
Memphis	1977	(Sweden) Björn Borg	(United States) Brian Gottfried	6–4, 6–3, 4–6, 7–5
Memphis	1978	(United States) Jimmy Connors	(United States) Tim Gullikson	7–6, 6–3
Memphis	1979	(United States) Jimmy Connors	(United States) Arthur Ashe	6–4, 5–7, 6–3
Memphis	1980	(United States) John McEnroe	(United States) Jimmy Connors	7–6^{(8–6)}, 7–6^{(7–4)}
Memphis	1981	(United States) Gene Mayer	(United States) Roscoe Tanner	6–2, 6–4
Memphis	1982	(South Africa) Johan Kriek	(United States) John McEnroe	6–3, 3–6, 6–4
Memphis	1983	(United States) Jimmy Connors	(United States) Gene Mayer	7–5, 6–0
Memphis	1984	(United States) Jimmy Connors	(France) Henri Leconte	6–3, 4–6, 7–5
Memphis	1985	(Sweden) Stefan Edberg	(France) Yannick Noah	6–1, 6–0
Memphis	1986	(United States) Brad Gilbert	(Sweden) Stefan Edberg	7–5, 7–6
Memphis	1987	(Sweden) Stefan Edberg	(United States) Jimmy Connors	6–3, 2–1 (retired)
Memphis	1988	(United States) Andre Agassi	(Sweden) Mikael Pernfors	6–4, 6–4, 7–5
Memphis	1989	(United States) Brad Gilbert	(United States) Johan Kriek	6–2, 6–2 (retired)
Memphis	1990	(West Germany) Michael Stich	(Australia) Wally Masur	6–7, 6–4, 7–6
Memphis	1991	(Czechoslovakia) Ivan Lendl	(Germany) Michael Stich	7–5, 6–3
Memphis	1992	(United States) MaliVai Washington	(South Africa) Wayne Ferreira	6–3, 6–2
Memphis	1993	(United States) Jim Courier	(United States) Todd Martin	5–7, 7–6^{(7–4)}, 7–6^{(7–4)}
Memphis	1994	(United States) Todd Martin	(United States) Brad Gilbert	6–4, 7–5
Memphis	1995	(United States) Todd Martin	(Netherlands) Paul Haarhuis	7–6^{(7–2)}, 6–4
Memphis	1996	(United States) Pete Sampras	(United States) Todd Martin	6–4, 7–6^{(7–2)}
Memphis	1997	(United States) Michael Chang	(Australia) Todd Woodbridge	6–3, 6–4
Memphis	1998	(Australia) Mark Philippoussis	(United States) Michael Chang	6–3, 6–2
Memphis	1999	(Germany) Tommy Haas	(United States) Jim Courier	6–4, 6–1
Memphis	2000	(Sweden) Magnus Larsson	(Zimbabwe) Byron Black	6–2, 1–6, 6–3
Memphis	2001	(Australia) Mark Philippoussis	(Italy) Davide Sanguinetti	6–3, 6–7^{(5–7)}, 6–3
Memphis	2002	(United States) Andy Roddick	(United States) James Blake	6–4, 3–6, 7–5
Memphis	2003	(United States) Taylor Dent	(United States) Andy Roddick	6–1, 6–4
Memphis	2004	(Sweden) Joachim Johansson	(Germany) Nicolas Kiefer	7–6^{(7–5)}, 6–3
Memphis	2005	(Denmark) Kenneth Carlsen	(Belarus) Max Mirnyi	7–5, 7–5
Memphis	2006	(Germany) Tommy Haas	(Sweden) Robin Söderling	6–3, 6–2
Memphis	2007	(Germany) Tommy Haas	(United States) Andy Roddick	6–3, 6–2
Memphis	2008	(Belgium) Steve Darcis	(Sweden) Robin Söderling	6–3, 7–6^{(7–5)}
Memphis	2009	(United States) Andy Roddick	(Czech Republic) Radek Štěpánek	7–5, 7–5
Memphis	2010	(United States) Sam Querrey	(United States) John Isner	6–7^{(3–7)}, 7–6^{(7–5)}, 6–3
Memphis	2011	(United States) Andy Roddick	(Canada) Milos Raonic	7–6^{(9–7)}, 6–7^{(11–13)}, 7–5
Memphis	2012	(Austria) Jürgen Melzer	(Canada) Milos Raonic	7–5, 7–6^{(7–4)}
Memphis	2013	(Japan) Kei Nishikori	(Spain) Feliciano López	6–2, 6–3
Memphis	2014	(Japan) Kei Nishikori	(Croatia) Ivo Karlović	6–4, 7–6^{(7–0)}
Memphis	2015	see Memphis Open		

=== Doubles ===
Location	Year	Champions	Runners-up	Score
Salisbury	1971	(Spain) Juan Gisbert, Sr. (Spain) Manuel Orantes	(United States) Clark Graebner (Brazil) Thomaz Koch	7–6, 6–2
Salisbury	1972	(Spain) Andrés Gimeno (Spain) Manuel Orantes	(Spain) Juan Gisbert, Sr. (Czechoslovakia) Vladimir Zednik	4–6, 6–3, 6–4
Salisbury	1973	(West Germany) Jürgen Fassbender (Spain) Juan Gisbert, Sr.	(United States) Clark Graebner (Romania) Ilie Năstase	2–6, 6–4, 6–3
Salisbury	1974	(United States) Jimmy Connors (South Africa) Frew McMillan	(South Africa) Byron Bertram (Rhodesia) Andrew Pattison	7–5, 6–2
Salisbury	1975	(United States) Jimmy Connors (Romania) Ilie Năstase	(Czechoslovakia) Jan Kodeš (United Kingdom) Roger Taylor	4–6, 6–3, 6–3
Salisbury	1976	(United States) Fred McNair (United States) Sherwood Stewart	(United States) Steve Krulevitz (United States) Trey Waltke	6–3, 6–2
Memphis	1977	(United States) Fred McNair (United States) Sherwood Stewart	(United States) Robert Lutz (United States) Stan Smith	4–6, 7–6, 7–6
Memphis	1978	(United States) Brian Gottfried (Mexico) Raúl Ramírez	(Australia) Phil Dent (Australia) John Newcombe	3–6, 7–6, 6–2
Memphis	1979	(Netherlands) Tom Okker (Poland) Wojciech Fibak	(South Africa) Frew McMillan (United States) Dick Stockton	6–4, 6–4
Memphis	1980	(United States) John McEnroe (United States) Brian Gottfried	(Australia) Rod Frawley (Czechoslovakia) Tomáš Šmíd	6–3, 6–7, 7–6
Memphis	1981	(United States) Gene Mayer (United States) Sandy Mayer	(United States) Mike Cahill (United States) Tom Gullikson	7–6, 6–7, 7–6
Memphis	1982	(South Africa) Kevin Curren (United States) Steve Denton	(United States) John McEnroe (United States) Peter Fleming	7–6, 4–6, 6–2
Memphis	1983	(Australia) Peter McNamara (Australia) Paul McNamee	(United States) Tim Gullikson (United States) Tom Gullikson	6–3, 5–7, 6–4
Memphis	1984	(United States) Fritz Buehning (United States) Peter Fleming	(Switzerland) Heinz Günthardt (Czechoslovakia) Tomáš Šmíd	6–3, 6–0
Memphis	1985	(Czechoslovakia) Pavel Složil (Czechoslovakia) Tomáš Šmíd	(South Africa) Kevin Curren (United States) Steve Denton	1–6, 6–3, 6–4
Memphis	1986	(United States) Ken Flach (United States) Robert Seguso	(France) Guy Forget (Sweden) Anders Järryd	6–4, 4–6, 7–6
Memphis	1987	(Sweden) Anders Järryd (Sweden) Jonas Svensson	(Spain) Sergio Casal (Spain) Emilio Sánchez	6–4, 6–2
Memphis	1988	(United States) Kevin Curren (United States) David Pate	(Sweden) Peter Lundgren (Sweden) Mikael Pernfors	6–2, 6–2
Memphis	1989	(United States) Paul Annacone (South Africa) Christo van Rensburg	(United States) Scott Davis (United States) Tim Wilkison	7–6, 6–7, 6–1
Memphis	1990	(Australia) Darren Cahill (Australia) Mark Kratzmann	(West Germany) Udo Riglewski (West Germany) Michael Stich	7–5, 6–2
Memphis	1991	(Germany) Michael Stich (Germany) Udo Riglewski	(Australia) John Fitzgerald (Australia) Laurie Warder	7–5, 6–3
Memphis	1992	(Australia) Todd Woodbridge (Australia) Mark Woodforde	(United States) Kevin Curren (South Africa) Gary Muller	7–6, 6–1
Memphis	1993	(Australia) Todd Woodbridge (Australia) Mark Woodforde	(Netherlands) Jacco Eltingh (Netherlands) Paul Haarhuis	7–5, 4–6, 7–6
Memphis	1994	(Zimbabwe) Byron Black (United States) Jonathan Stark	(United States) Jim Grabb (United States) Jared Palmer	7–6, 6–4
Memphis	1995	(United States) Jared Palmer (United States) Richey Reneberg	(United States) Tommy Ho (New Zealand) Brett Steven	4–6, 7–6, 6–1
Memphis	1996	(The Bahamas) Mark Knowles (Canada) Daniel Nestor	(Australia) Todd Woodbridge (Australia) Mark Woodforde	6–4, 7–5
Memphis	1997	(South Africa) Ellis Ferreira (United States) Patrick Galbraith	(United States) Rick Leach (United States) Jonathan Stark	6–3, 3–6, 6–1
Memphis	1998	(Australia) Todd Woodbridge (Australia) Mark Woodforde	(South Africa) Ellis Ferreira (Mexico) David Roditi	6–3, 6–4
Memphis	1999	(Australia) Todd Woodbridge (Australia) Mark Woodforde	(Canada) Sébastien Lareau (United States) Alex O'Brien	6–3, 6–4
Memphis	2000	(United States) Justin Gimelstob (Canada) Sébastien Lareau	(United States) Jim Grabb (United States) Richey Reneberg	6–2, 6–4
Memphis	2001	(United States) Bob Bryan (United States) Mike Bryan	(United States) Alex O'Brien (United States) Jonathan Stark	6–3, 7–6
Memphis	2002	(United States) Brian MacPhie (Serbia and Montenegro) Nenad Zimonjić	(United States) Bob Bryan (United States) Mike Bryan	6–3, 3–6, [10–4]
Memphis	2003	(The Bahamas) Mark Knowles (Canada) Daniel Nestor	(United States) Bob Bryan (United States) Mike Bryan	6–2, 7–6
Memphis	2004	(United States) Bob Bryan (United States) Mike Bryan	(South Africa) Jeff Coetzee (South Africa) Chris Haggard	6–3, 6–4
Memphis	2005	(Sweden) Simon Aspelin (Australia) Todd Perry	(United States) Bob Bryan (United States) Mike Bryan	6–4, 6–4
Memphis	2006	(Croatia) Ivo Karlović (South Africa) Chris Haggard	(United States) James Blake (United States) Mardy Fish	0–6, 7–5, [10–5]
Memphis	2007	(United States) Eric Butorac (United Kingdom) Jamie Murray	(Austria) Julian Knowle (Austria) Jürgen Melzer	7–5, 6–3
Memphis	2008	(India) Mahesh Bhupathi (The Bahamas) Mark Knowles	(Thailand) Sanchai Ratiwatana (Thailand) Sonchat Ratiwatana	7–6^{(7–5)}, 6–2
Memphis	2009	(United States) Mardy Fish (The Bahamas) Mark Knowles	(United States) Travis Parrott (Slovakia) Filip Polášek	7–6^{(9–7)}, 6–1
Memphis	2010	(United States) John Isner (United States) Sam Querrey	(United Kingdom) Ross Hutchins (Australia) Jordan Kerr	6–4, 6–4
Memphis	2011	(Belarus) Max Mirnyi (Canada) Daniel Nestor	(United States) Eric Butorac (Curaçao) Jean-Julien Rojer	6–2, 6–7^{(6–8)}, [10–3]
Memphis	2012	(Belarus) Max Mirnyi (Canada) Daniel Nestor	(Croatia) Ivan Dodig (Brazil) Marcelo Melo	4–6, 7–5, [10–7]
Memphis	2013	(United States) Bob Bryan (United States) Mike Bryan	(United States) James Blake (United States) Jack Sock	6–1, 6–2
Memphis	2014	(United States) Eric Butorac (South Africa) Raven Klaasen	(United States) Bob Bryan (United States) Mike Bryan	6–4, 6–4
Memphis	2015	see Memphis Open		

== Women's finals ==
=== Singles ===
Location	Year	Champions	Runners-up	Score
Oklahoma City	1986	(Netherlands) Marcella Mesker	(United States) Lori McNeil	6–4, 4–6, 6–3
Oklahoma City	1987	(Australia) Elizabeth Smylie	(United States) Lori McNeil	4–6, 6–3, 7–5
Oklahoma City	1988	(United States) Lori McNeil	(Netherlands) Brenda Schultz	6–3, 6–2
Oklahoma City	1989	(Netherlands) Manon Bollegraf	(Soviet Union) Leila Meskhi	6–4, 6–4
Oklahoma City	1990	(United States) Amy Frazier	(Netherlands) Manon Bollegraf	6–4, 6–2
Oklahoma City	1991	(Czechoslovakia) Jana Novotná	(United States) Anne Smith	3–6, 6–3, 6–2
Oklahoma City	1992	(United States) Zina Garrison-Jackson	(United States) Lori McNeil	7–5, 3–6, 7–6
Oklahoma City	1993	(United States) Zina Garrison-Jackson (2)	(United States) Patty Fendick	6–2, 6–2
Oklahoma City	1994	(United States) Meredith McGrath	(Netherlands) Brenda Schultz	7–6^{(8–6)}, 7–6^{(7–4)}
Oklahoma City	1995	(Netherlands) Brenda Schultz	(Russia) Elena Likhovtseva	6–1, 6–2
Oklahoma City	1996	(Netherlands) Brenda Schultz-McCarthy(2)	(South Africa) Amanda Coetzer	6–3, 6–2
Oklahoma City	1997	(United States) Lindsay Davenport	(United States) Lisa Raymond	6–4, 6–2
Oklahoma City	1998	(United States) Venus Williams	(South Africa) Joannette Kruger	6–3, 6–2
Oklahoma City	1999	(United States) Venus Williams (2)	(South Africa) Amanda Coetzer	6–3, 6–0
Oklahoma City	2000	(United States) Monica Seles	(France) Nathalie Dechy	6–1, 7–6^{(7–3)}
Oklahoma City	2001	(United States) Monica Seles (2)	(United States) Jennifer Capriati	6–3, 5–7, 6–2
Memphis	2002	(United States) Lisa Raymond	(United States) Alexandra Stevenson	4–6, 6–3, 7–6^{(11–9)}
Memphis	2003	(United States) Lisa Raymond (2)	(South Africa) Amanda Coetzer	6–3, 6–2
Memphis	2004	(Russia) Vera Zvonareva	(United States) Lisa Raymond	4–6, 6–4, 7–5
Memphis	2005	(Russia) Vera Zvonareva (2)	(United States) Meghann Shaughnessy	7–6^{(7–3)}, 6–2
Memphis	2006	(Sweden) Sofia Arvidsson	(Poland) Marta Domachowska	6–2, 2–6, 6–3
Memphis	2007	(United States) Venus Williams (3)	(Israel) Shahar Pe'er	6–1, 6–1
Memphis	2008	(United States) Lindsay Davenport (2)	(Belarus) Olga Govortsova	6–2, 6–1
Memphis	2009	(Belarus) Victoria Azarenka	(Denmark) Caroline Wozniacki	6–1, 6–3
Memphis	2010	(Russia) Maria Sharapova	(Sweden) Sofia Arvidsson	6–2, 6–1
Memphis	2011	(Slovakia) Magdaléna Rybáriková	(Canada) Rebecca Marino	6–2, ret.
Memphis	2012	(Sweden) Sofia Arvidsson (2)	(New Zealand) Marina Erakovic	6–3, 6–4
Memphis	2013	(New Zealand) Marina Erakovic	(Germany) Sabine Lisicki	6–1, ret.

=== Doubles ===
Location	Year	Champions	Runners-up	Score
Oklahoma City	1986	(Netherlands) Marcella Mesker (France) Pascale Paradis	(United States) Lori McNeil (France) Catherine Suire	2–6, 7–6^{(7–1)}, 6–1
Oklahoma City	1987	(Soviet Union) Svetlana Parkhomenko (Soviet Union) Larisa Savchenko	(United States) Lori McNeil (United States) Kim Sands	6–4, 6–4
Oklahoma City	1988	(Czechoslovakia) Jana Novotná (France) Catherine Suire	(Sweden) Catarina Lindqvist (Denmark) Tine Scheuer-Larsen	6–4, 6–4
Oklahoma City	1989	(United States) Lori McNeil (United States) Betsy Nagelsen	(United States) Elise Burgin (Australia) Elizabeth Smylie	W/O
Oklahoma City	1990	(United States) Mary Lou Daniels (United States) Wendy White	(Netherlands) Manon Bollegraf (South Africa) Lise Gregory	7–5, 6–2
Oklahoma City	1991	(United States) Meredith McGrath (United States) Anne Smith	(United States) Katrina Adams (Canada) Jill Hetherington	6–2, 6–4
Oklahoma City	1992	(United States) Lori McNeil (2) (Australia) Nicole Provis	(United States) Katrina Adams (Netherlands) Manon Bollegraf	3–6, 6–4, 7–6^{(8–6)}
Oklahoma City	1993	(United States) Patty Fendick (United States) Zina Garrison-Jackson	(United States) Katrina Adams (Netherlands) Manon Bollegraf	6–3, 6–2
Oklahoma City	1994	(United States) Patty Fendick (2) (United States) Meredith McGrath (2)	(United States) Katrina Adams (Netherlands) Manon Bollegraf	7–6^{(7–3)}, 6–2
Oklahoma City	1995	(United States) Nicole Arendt (Italy) Laura Golarsa	(United States) Katrina Adams (Netherlands) Brenda Schultz	6–4, 6–3
Oklahoma City	1996	(United States) Chanda Rubin (Netherlands) Brenda Schultz-McCarthy	(United States) Katrina Adams (United States) Debbie Graham	6–4, 6–3
Oklahoma City	1997	(Japan) Rika Hiraki (Japan) Nana Miyagi	(United States) Marianne Werdel-Witmeyer (United States) Tami Whitlinger-Jones	6–4, 6–1
Oklahoma City	1998	(United States) Serena Williams (United States) Venus Williams	(Romania) Cătălina Cristea (Australia) Kristine Kunce	7–5, 6–2
Oklahoma City	1999	(United States) Lisa Raymond (Australia) Rennae Stubbs	(South Africa) Amanda Coetzer (South Africa) Jessica Steck	6–3, 6–4
Oklahoma City	2000	(United States) Kimberly Po (United States) Corina Morariu	(Thailand) Tamarine Tanasugarn (Ukraine) Elena Tatarkova	6–4, 4–6, 6–2
Oklahoma City	2001	(South Africa) Amanda Coetzer (United States) Lori McNeil (3)	(Chinese Taipei) Janet Lee (Indonesia) Wynne Prakusya	6–3, 2–6, 6–0
Memphis	2002	(Japan) Ai Sugiyama (Ukraine) Elena Tatarkova	(United States) Melissa Middleton (United States) Brie Rippner	6–4, 2–6, 6–0
Memphis	2003	(Japan) Akiko Morigami (Japan) Saori Obata	(Russia) Alina Jidkova (Australia) Bryanne Stewart	6–1, 6–1
Memphis	2004	(Sweden) Åsa Svensson (United States) Meilen Tu	(Russia) Maria Sharapova (Russia) Vera Zvonareva	6–4, 7–6^{(7–0)}
Memphis	2005	(Japan) Miho Saeki (Japan) Yuka Yoshida	(United States) Laura Granville (United States) Abigail Spears	6–3, 6–4
Memphis	2006	(United States) Lisa Raymond (2) (Australia) Samantha Stosur	(Belarus) Victoria Azarenka (Denmark) Caroline Wozniacki	7–6^{(7–2)}, 6–3
Memphis	2007	(Australia) Nicole Pratt (Australia) Bryanne Stewart	(Slovakia) Jarmila Gajdošová (Japan) Akiko Morigami	7–5, 4–6, [10–5]
Memphis	2008	(United States) Lindsay Davenport (United States) Lisa Raymond (3)	(United States) Angela Haynes (United States) Mashona Washington	6–3, 6–1
Memphis	2009	(Belarus) Victoria Azarenka (Denmark) Caroline Wozniacki	(Ukraine) Yuliana Fedak (Netherlands) Michaëlla Krajicek	6–1, 7–6^{(7–2)}
Memphis	2010	(United States) Vania King (Netherlands) Michaëlla Krajicek	(United States) Bethanie Mattek-Sands (United States) Meghann Shaughnessy	7–5, 6–2
Memphis	2011	(Belarus) Olga Govortsova (Russia) Alla Kudryavtseva	(Czech Republic) Andrea Hlaváčková (Czech Republic) Lucie Hradecká	6–3, 4–6, [10–8]
Memphis	2012	(Czech Republic) Andrea Hlaváčková (Czech Republic) Lucie Hradecká	(Russia) Vera Dushevina (Belarus) Olga Govortsova	6–3, 6–4
Memphis	2013	(Kazakhstan) Galina Voskoboeva (France) Kristina Mladenovic	(Sweden) Sofia Arvidsson (Sweden) Johanna Larsson	7–6^{(7–5)}, 6–3

== See also ==
- U.S. Women's Indoor Championships
- U.S. Pro Indoor
- Category:National and multi-national tennis tournaments
