= 2005 Regions Morgan Keegan Championships – Singles =

Singles
- 2005 Regions Morgan Keegan Championships and the Cellular South Cup

Final
- Champion: (Denmark) Kenneth Carlsen
- Runner-up: (Belarus) Max Mirnyi
- Score: 7–5, 7–5

Details
- Draw: 32
- Seeds: 8

Events
Singles	men	women
Doubles	men	women
← 2004 ·	Regions Morgan Keegan Championships	· 2006 →
← 2004 ·	Cellular South Cup	· 2006 →

Joachim Johansson was the defending champion, but did not participate.

Kenneth Carlsen won the title, defeating Max Mirnyi in the final 7–5, 7–5.

== Seeds ==
1. (United States) Andy Roddick (semifinals, withdrew due to ankle sprain)
2. (Germany) Tommy Haas (semifinals)
3. (United States) Vince Spadea (second round, retired due to a shoulder injury)
4. (Czech Republic) Jiří Novák (first round)
5. (Belgium) Xavier Malisse (quarterfinals)
6. (United States) Mardy Fish (second round)
7. (Austria) Jürgen Melzer (first round)
8. (Belarus) Max Mirnyi (final)

== Draw ==
=== Key ===
- Q = Qualifier
- WC = Wild card
- LL = Lucky loser
- Alt = Alternate
- ITF = ITF entry
- PR = Protected ranking
- SR = Special ranking
- SE = Special exempt
- JE = Junior exempt
- JR = Junior Accelerator Programme entrant
- CO = College Accelerator Programme entrant
- NG = Next Gen Accelerator Program entrant
- w/o = Walkover
- r = Retired
- d = Defaulted

=== Finals ===
Semifinals
1	(United States) Andy Roddick
(Denmark) Kenneth Carlsen	w/o
8	(Belarus) Max Mirnyi	7	6
2	(Germany) Tommy Haas	5	3

Final
(Denmark) Kenneth Carlsen	7	7
8	(Belarus) Max Mirnyi	5	5

=== Top half ===
First round
1	(United States) A Roddick	6	6
(South Korea) H-t Lee	3	4
(France) A Clément	7^{8}	1	6
Q	(Italy) D Sanguinetti	6^{6}	6	1
(United States) R Ginepri	6	6
WC	(United States) Z Dailey	2	0
(United States) J Blake	3	6	6^{7}
6	(United States) M Fish	6	2	7^{9}
4	(Czech Republic) J Novák	0	4
(United States) J-M Gambill	6	6
(Georgia (country)) I Labadze	6	7^{7}
(Sweden) J Björkman	4	6^{1}
(France) G Carraz	4	6	6^{0}
(Denmark) K Carlsen	6	3	7^{7}
(Australia) W Arthurs	7^{7}	7^{7}
7	(Austria) J Melzer	6^{5}	6^{4}

Second round
1	(United States) A Roddick	6	6
(France) A Clément	3	3
(United States) R Ginepri	6	7
6	(United States) M Fish	1	5
(United States) J-M Gambill	7^{7}	7^{7}
(Georgia (country)) I Labadze	6^{2}	6^{3}
(Denmark) K Carlsen	6	7^{7}
(Australia) W Arthurs	4	6^{5}

Quarterfinals
1	(United States) A Roddick	7^{9}	7^{7}
(United States) R Ginepri	6^{7}	6^{2}
(United States) J-M Gambill	6^{7}	5
(Denmark) K Carlsen	7^{9}	7

Semifinals
1	(United States) A Roddick
(Denmark) K Carlsen	w/o

=== Bottom half ===
First round
8	(Belarus) M Mirnyi	7^{7}	6^{1}	7^{11}
WC	(United States) B Baker	6^{1}	7^{7}	6^{9}
(France) C Saulnier	5	6	6
Q	(United States) R Kendrick	7	3	4
(France) A Dupuis	7^{9}	7^{7}
(United States) J Morrison	6^{7}	6^{5}
(Sweden) T Enqvist	5	2
3	(United States) V Spadea	7	6
5	(Belgium) X Malisse	6	6
(Germany) P Kohlschreiber	3	3
(Chinese Taipei) Y-h Lu	2	4
Q	(Canada) F Dancevic	6	6
WC	(United States) S Jenkins	4	7^{7}	6^{4}
(United States) K Kim	6	6^{5}	7^{7}
Q	(United States) J Salzenstein	4	4
2	(Germany) T Haas	6	6

Second round
8	(Belarus) M Mirnyi	7	6
(France) C Saulnier	5	4
(France) A Dupuis	7	2
3	(United States) V Spadea	5	0^{r}
5	(Belgium) X Malisse	6	6
Q	(Canada) F Dancevic	2	2
(United States) K Kim	6^{4}	3
2	(Germany) T Haas	7^{7}	6

Quarterfinals
8	(Belarus) M Mirnyi	7^{7}	7^{7}
(France) A Dupuis	6^{1}	6^{1}
5	(Belgium) X Malisse	4	3
2	(Germany) T Haas	6	6

Semifinals
8	(Belarus) M Mirnyi	7	6
2	(Germany) T Haas	5	3
