= 2003 Kroger St. Jude International – Women's singles =

Women's singles
- 2003 Kroger St. Jude International

Final
- Champion: (United States) Lisa Raymond
- Runner-up: (South Africa) Amanda Coetzer
- Score: 6–3, 6–2

Details
- Draw: 30
- Seeds: 8

Events
| Singles | men | women |
| Doubles | men | women |
| ← 2002 · | U.S. National Indoor Championships | · 2004 → |

Lisa Raymond was the defending champion and successfully defended her title by defeating Amanda Coetzer 6–3, 6–2 in the final.

== Seeds ==
The top two seeds received a bye into the second round.

1. (Italy) Silvia Farina Elia (quarterfinals)
2. (United States) Lisa Raymond (champion)
3. (South Africa) Amanda Coetzer (final)
4. (United States) Alexandra Stevenson (second round)
5. (Russia) Vera Zvonareva (second round)
6. (United States) Laura Granville (semifinals)
7. (France) ~~Émilie Loit~~ (withdrew due to a left shoulder tendonitis)
8. (United States) Jill Craybas (first round)

== Draw ==
=== Key ===
- Q = Qualifier
- WC = Wild card
- LL = Lucky loser
- Alt = Alternate
- SE = Special exempt
- PR = Protected ranking
- ITF = ITF entry
- JE = Junior exempt
- w/o = Walkover
- r = Retired
- d = Defaulted
- SR = Special ranking

=== Finals ===
Semifinals
6 | (United States) Laura Granville | 4 | 1
3 | (South Africa) Amanda Coetzer | 6 | 6
(South Korea) Cho Yoon-jeong | 3 | 6 | 3
2 | (United States) Lisa Raymond | 6 | 2 | 6

Final
3 | (South Africa) Amanda Coetzer | 3 | 2
2 | (United States) Lisa Raymond | 6 | 6

=== Top half ===
First round
(Italy) A Serra Zanetti | 7 | 6
(Japan) S Asagoe | 5 | 0
(United States) M Irvin | 7^{10} | 0 | 2
PR | (United States) S Cacic | 6^{8} | 6 | 6
(Japan) A Morigami | 1 | 2
6 | (United States) L Granville | 6 | 6
3 | (South Africa) A Coetzer | 2 | 7^{7} | 6
(Germany) A Roesch | 6 | 6^{4} | 1
(United States) B Mattek | 4 | 4
(United States) S Taylor | 6 | 6
Q | (Canada) M-È Pelletier | 6^{3} | 3
(France) S Foretz | 7^{7} | 6
(Russia) A Jidkova | 6 | 6
8 | (United States) J Craybas | 1 | 1

Second round
1 | (Italy) S Farina Elia | 6 | 7
(Italy) A Serra Zanetti | 2 | 5
PR | (United States) S Cacic | 6^{4} | 1
6 | (United States) L Granville | 7^{7} | 6
3 | (South Africa) A Coetzer | 4 | 6 | 6
(United States) S Taylor | 6 | 2 | 2
(France) S Foretz | 7^{7} | 1 | 6
(Russia) A Jidkova | 6^{5} | 6 | 3

Quarterfinals
1 | (Italy) S Farina Elia | 6 | 6^{6} | 4
6 | (United States) L Granville | 2 | 7^{8} | 6
3 | (South Africa) A Coetzer | 7 | 6
(France) S Foretz | 5 | 4

Semifinals
6 | (United States) L Granville | 4 | 1
3 | (South Africa) A Coetzer | 6 | 6

=== Bottom half ===
First round
5 | (Russia) V Zvonareva | 6 | 7^{7}
(Germany) B Lamade | 1 | 6^{4}
(South Korea) Y-j Cho | 6 | 6
(United States) M Washington | 4 | 4
(Japan) S Obata | 6 | 6
LL | (Canada) V Webb | 4 | 0
Q | (Australia) S Stosur | 6 | 6^{7} | 6^{8}
4 | (United States) A Stevenson | 3 | 7^{9} | 7^{10}
LL | (Russia) M Goloviznina | 6 | 6
Q/PR | (United States) D Ospina | 2 | 3
(United States) L Lee-Waters | 3 | 6 | 5
WC | (United States) C Gullickson | 6 | 3 | 7
Q | (United States) T Snyder | 6 | 6
WC | (United States) T Cochran | 3 | 1

Second round
5 | (Russia) V Zvonareva | 2 | 4
(South Korea) Y-j Cho | 6 | 6
(Japan) S Obata | 7^{7} | 6
4 | (United States) A Stevenson | 6^{1} | 3
LL | (Russia) M Goloviznina | 1 | 6 | 2
WC | (United States) C Gullickson | 6 | 3 | 6
Q | (United States) T Snyder | 3 | 3
2 | (United States) L Raymond | 6 | 6

Quarterfinals
(South Korea) Y-j Cho | 6 | 6
(Japan) S Obata | 0 | 3
WC | (United States) C Gullickson | 6 | 3 | 4
2 | (United States) L Raymond | 4 | 6 | 6

Semifinals
(South Korea) Y-j Cho | 3 | 6 | 3
2 | (United States) L Raymond | 6 | 2 | 6
