= 2005 Cellular South Cup – Singles =

Singles
- 2005 Regions Morgan Keegan Championships and the Cellular South Cup

Final
- Champion: (Russia) Vera Zvonareva
- Runner-up: (United States) Meghann Shaughnessy
- Score: 7–6^{(7–3)}, 6–2

Details
- Draw: 32
- Seeds: 8

Events
Singles	men	women
Doubles	men	women
← 2004 ·	Regions Morgan Keegan Championships	· 2006 →
← 2004 ·	Cellular South Cup	· 2006 →

Vera Zvonareva was the defending champion and successfully defended her title by defeating Meghann Shaughnessy 7–6^{(7–3)}, 6–2 in the final.

== Seeds ==
1. (Russia) Vera Zvonareva (champion)
2. (United States) Amy Frazier (first round)
3. (United States) Meghann Shaughnessy (final)
4. (Slovakia) Martina Suchá (first round)
5. (United States) Mashona Washington (first round)
6. (Russia) Alina Jidkova (first round)
7. (Czech Republic) Nicole Vaidišová (semifinals)
8. (Russia) Evgenia Linetskaya (semifinals)

== Draw ==
=== Key ===
- Q = Qualifier
- WC = Wild card
- LL = Lucky loser
- Alt = Alternate
- SE = Special exempt
- PR = Protected ranking
- ITF = ITF entry
- JE = Junior exempt
- w/o = Walkover
- r = Retired
- d = Defaulted
- SR = Special ranking

=== Finals ===
Semifinals
1	(Russia) Vera Zvonareva	6	6
8	(Russia) Evgenia Linetskaya	4	1
3	(United States) Meghann Shaughnessy	7^{10}	7^{8}
7	(Czech Republic) Nicole Vaidišová	6^{8}	6^{6}

Final
1	(Russia) Vera Zvonareva	7^{7}	6
3	(United States) Meghann Shaughnessy	6^{3}	2

=== Top half ===
First round
1	(Russia) V Zvonareva	6	6
(Czech Republic) M Paštiková	3	1
(France) S Beltrame	3	6	6
(United States) L Osterloh	6	3	1
(United States) M Irvin	7^{7}	4	5
Q	(United States) A Haynes	6^{3}	6	7
WC	(Ukraine) K Bondarenko	4	6	6
6	(Russia) A Jidkova	6	4	3
4	(Slovakia) M Suchá	4	5
(Japan) A Morigami	6	7
(United States) K McCain	4	4
WC	(Netherlands) M Krajicek	6	6
Q	(Czech Republic) K Böhmová	2	7	4
Q	(Japan) Y Yoshida	6	5	6
LL	(Romania) E Gallovits	4	3
8	(Russia) E Linetskaya	6	6

Second round
1	(Russia) V Zvonareva	7^{7}	6
(France) S Beltrame	6^{0}	3
Q	(United States) A Haynes	6^{3}	5
WC	(Ukraine) K Bondarenko	7^{7}	7
(Japan) A Morigami	6^{2}	7^{9}	6
WC	(Netherlands) M Krajicek	7^{7}	6^{7}	4
Q	(Japan) Y Yoshida	2	2
8	(Russia) E Linetskaya	6	6

Quarterfinals
1	(Russia) V Zvonareva	7	6
WC	(Ukraine) K Bondarenko	5	0
(Japan) A Morigami	2	2
8	(Russia) E Linetskaya	6	6

Semifinals
1	(Russia) V Zvonareva	6	6
8	(Russia) E Linetskaya	4	1

=== Bottom half ===
First round
5	(United States) M Washington	3	5
(United States) A Spears	6	7
(Italy) An Serra Zanetti	4	6	2
PR	(South Korea) Y-j Cho	6	1	6
(United States) J Craybas	6	4	5
(Czech Republic) H Šromová	4	6	7
(United States) L Granville	3	4
3	(United States) M Shaughnessy	6	6
7	(Czech Republic) N Vaidišová	6	6
(United States) L Lee-Waters	2	3
(Puerto Rico) K Brandi	6	6
Q	(United States) J Hopkins	3	0
(Bulgaria) S Karatantcheva	7	6
PR	(Netherlands) S Noorlander	5	3
(United States) J Jackson	7^{7}	0	6
2	(United States) A Frazier	6^{4}	6	3

Second round
(United States) A Spears	4	4
PR	(South Korea) Y-j Cho	6	6
(Czech Republic) H Šromová	3	2
3	(United States) M Shaughnessy	6	6
7	(Czech Republic) N Vaidišová	6	6
(Puerto Rico) K Brandi	2	2
(Bulgaria) S Karatantcheva	3	4
(United States) J Jackson	6	6

Quarterfinals
PR	(South Korea) Y-j Cho	1	2
3	(United States) M Shaughnessy	6	6
7	(Czech Republic) N Vaidišová	6	6^{2}	6
(United States) J Jackson	2	7^{7}	4

Semifinals
3	(United States) M Shaughnessy	7^{10}	7^{8}
7	(Czech Republic) N Vaidišová	6^{8}	6^{6}
