= 2004 Kroger St. Jude International – Singles =

Singles
- 2004 Kroger St. Jude International and the Cellular South Cup

Final
- Champion: (Sweden) Joachim Johansson
- Runner-up: (Germany) Nicolas Kiefer
- Score: 7–6^{(7–5)}, 6–3

Details
- Draw: 32
- Seeds: 8

Events
Singles	men	women
Doubles	men	women
← 2003 ·	Kroger St. Jude International	· 2005 →
← 2003 ·	Cellular South Cup	· 2005 →

Taylor Dent was the defending champion but lost in the first round to Jan-Michael Gambill.

Joachim Johansson won in the final 7–6^{(7–5)}, 6–3 against Nicolas Kiefer.

== Seeds ==
1. (United States) Andy Roddick (quarterfinals)
2. (United States) Mardy Fish (semifinals)
3. (United States) Taylor Dent (first round)
4. (United States) Robby Ginepri (first round)
5. (United States) Vince Spadea (first round)
6. (United States) James Blake (second round)
7. (South Africa) Wayne Ferreira (second round)
8. (Germany) Nicolas Kiefer (final)

== Draw ==
=== Key ===
- Q = Qualifier
- WC = Wild card
- LL = Lucky loser
- Alt = Alternate
- SE = Special exempt
- PR = Protected ranking
- ITF = ITF entry
- JE = Junior exempt
- w/o = Walkover
- r = Retired
- d = Defaulted
- SR = Special ranking

=== Finals ===
Semifinals
(Sweden) Thomas Enqvist	3	3
8	(Germany) Nicolas Kiefer	6	6
(Sweden) Joachim Johansson	6	6
2	(United States) Mardy Fish	2	4

Final
8	(Germany) Nicolas Kiefer	6^{5}	3
(Sweden) Joachim Johansson	7^{7}	6

=== Top half ===
First round
1	(United States) A Roddick	7^{7}	1	7
(United States) T Martin	6^{2}	6	5
Q	(France) S de Chaunac	3	6	6
(Georgia (country)) I Labadze	6	3	6^{r}
(Germany) A Popp	6	6
WC	(Germany) T Haas	3	3
(Sweden) T Enqvist	6	7
5	(United States) V Spadea	4	5
3	(United States) T Dent	6^{6}	3
(United States) J-M Gambill	7^{8}	6
(France) A Dupuis	4	5
WC	(United States) B Baker	6	7
(Austria) J Melzer	6	6^{5}	7^{7}
(United States) B Vahaly	3	7^{7}	6^{4}
Q	(United States) E Taino	4	6	1
8	(Germany) N Kiefer	6	3	6

Second round
1	(United States) A Roddick	6	6
Q	(France) S de Chaunac	3	3
(Germany) A Popp	6	1	4
(Sweden) T Enqvist	2	6	6
(United States) J-M Gambill	6	6
WC	(United States) B Baker	3	4
(Austria) J Melzer	6^{5}	7^{7}	3
8	(Germany) N Kiefer	7^{7}	6^{2}	6

Quarterfinals
1	(United States) A Roddick	6^{8}	3
(Sweden) T Enqvist	7^{10}	6
(United States) J-M Gambill	3	4
8	(Germany) N Kiefer	6	6

Semifinals
(Sweden) T Enqvist	3	3
8	(Germany) N Kiefer	6	6

=== Bottom half ===
First round
6	(United States) J Blake	7^{7}	6
(South Africa) W Moodie	6^{5}	1
(Sweden) J Johansson	6	6^{5}	6
(South Korea) H-T Lee	4	7^{7}	2
(Belgium) X Malisse	6	6
Q	(United States) A Delić	4	3
(France) C Saulnier	3	7^{7}	6
4	(United States) R Ginepri	6	6^{3}	2
7	(South Africa) W Ferreira	7^{10}	6
WC	(United States) B Bryan	6^{8}	3
(Russia) D Tursunov	7^{7}	6
(Belgium) C Rochus	6^{5}	3
(Germany) L Burgsmüller	2	4
Q	(Canada) F Niemeyer	6	6
(France) O Mutis	6	3	4
2	(United States) M Fish	4	6	6

Second round
6	(United States) J Blake	3	3
(Sweden) J Johansson	6	6
(Belgium) X Malisse	7^{7}	6
(France) C Saulnier	6^{4}	2
7	(South Africa) W Ferreira	4	0
(Russia) D Tursunov	6	6
Q	(Canada) F Niemeyer	6	3	5
2	(United States) M Fish	1	6	7

Quarterfinals
(Sweden) J Johansson	6	7
(Belgium) X Malisse	4	5
(Russia) D Tursunov	3	6	4
2	(United States) M Fish	6	4	6

Semifinals
(Sweden) J Johansson	6	6
2	(United States) M Fish	2	4
