= 2004 Cellular South Cup – Singles =

Singles
- 2004 Kroger St. Jude International and the Cellular South Cup

Final
- Champion: (Russia) Vera Zvonareva
- Runner-up: (United States) Lisa Raymond
- Score: 4–6, 6–4, 7–5

Details
- Draw: 30
- Seeds: 8

Events
| Singles | men | women |
| Doubles | men | women |
| ← 2003 · | Kroger St. Jude International | · 2005 → |
| ← 2003 · | Cellular South Cup | · 2005 → |

Lisa Raymond was the defending champion, but lost in the final to Vera Zvonareva. The score was 4–6, 6–4, 7–5.

== Seeds ==
The first two seeds received a bye into the second round.

1. (Russia) Vera Zvonareva (champion)
2. (United States) Lisa Raymond (final)
3. (Russia) Maria Sharapova (semifinals)
4. (United States) Laura Granville (semifinals)
5. (United States) Ashley Harkleroad (second round)
6. (United States) Amy Frazier (quarterfinals)
7. (Puerto Rico) Kristina Brandi (quarterfinals)
8. (Japan) Akiko Morigami (first round)

== Draw ==
=== Key ===
- Q = Qualifier
- WC = Wild card
- LL = Lucky loser
- Alt = Alternate
- SE = Special exempt
- PR = Protected ranking
- ITF = ITF entry
- JE = Junior exempt
- w/o = Walkover
- r = Retired
- d = Defaulted
- SR = Special ranking

=== Finals ===
Semifinals
1 | (Russia) Vera Zvonareva | 7^{7} | 6
3 | (Russia) Maria Sharapova | 6^{5} | 2
4 | (United States) Laura Granville | 3 | 0
2 | (United States) Lisa Raymond | 6 | 6

Final
1 | (Russia) Vera Zvonareva | 4 | 6 | 7
2 | (United States) Lisa Raymond | 6 | 4 | 5

=== Top half ===
First round
(Italy) F Pennetta | 1 | 2
(Italy) T Garbin | 6 | 6
Q | (Slovakia) J Gajdošová | 5 | 3
(Argentina) G Dulko | 7 | 6
(Croatia) S Talaja | 3 | 1
5 | (United States) A Harkleroad | 6 | 6
3 | (Russia) M Sharapova | 6 | 6
(Spain) C Martínez Granados | 2 | 2
Q | (Russia) T Panova | 6^{2} | 6 | 6
(Italy) R Grande | 7^{7} | 4 | 1
(Russia) A Jidkova | 6^{5} | 7^{7} | 6
(Australia) S Stosur | 7^{7} | 6^{3} | 1
Q | (United States) A Haynes | 4 | 2
6 | (United States) A Frazier | 6 | 6

Second round
1 | (Russia) V Zvonareva | 6 | 7
(Italy) T Garbin | 1 | 5
(Argentina) G Dulko | 7 | 7^{7}
5 | (United States) A Harkleroad | 5 | 6^{3}
3 | (Russia) M Sharapova | 2
Q | (Russia) T Panova | 1^{r}
(Russia) A Jidkova | 2 | 4
6 | (United States) A Frazier | 6 | 6

Quarterfinals
1 | (Russia) V Zvonareva | 6 | 6
(Argentina) G Dulko | 3 | 4
3 | (Russia) M Sharapova | 6 | 6
6 | (United States) A Frazier | 2 | 4

Semifinals
1 | (Russia) V Zvonareva | 7^{7} | 6
3 | (Russia) M Sharapova | 6^{5} | 2

=== Bottom half ===
First round
7 | (Puerto Rico) K Brandi | 6 | 6
WC | (United States) C Gullickson | 0 | 0
(United States) S Perry | 6^{13} | 1
(Sweden) Å Svensson | 7^{15} | 6
(United States) T Snyder | 5 | 3
(Argentina) ME Salerni | 7 | 6
WC | (United States) B Bielik | 4 | 3
4 | (United States) L Granville | 6 | 6
8 | (Japan) A Morigami | 2 | 5
(United States) L Lee-Waters | 6 | 7
(Serbia and Montenegro) J Janković | 5 | 5
(Slovakia) M Suchá | 7 | 7
(Sweden) S Arvidsson | 6^{4} | 7^{7} | 1
Q | (Russia) G Voskoboeva | 7^{7} | 6^{4} | 6

Second round
7 | (Puerto Rico) K Brandi | 6 | 3 | 6
(Sweden) Å Svensson | 3 | 6 | 4
(Argentina) ME Salerni | 4 | 6^{4}
4 | (United States) L Granville | 6 | 7^{7}
(United States) L Lee-Waters | 6 | 6
(Slovakia) M Suchá | 3 | 3
Q | (Russia) G Voskoboeva | 2 | 3
2 | (United States) L Raymond | 6 | 6

Quarterfinals
7 | (Puerto Rico) K Brandi | 3 | 5
4 | (United States) L Granville | 6 | 7
(United States) L Lee-Waters | 0 | 6 | 1
2 | (United States) L Raymond | 6 | 4 | 6

Semifinals
4 | (United States) L Granville | 3 | 0
2 | (United States) L Raymond | 6 | 6
