= 1996 IGA Tennis Classic – Singles =

Singles
- 1996 IGA Tennis Classic
- 1995 Champion: (Netherlands) Brenda Schultz

Final
- Champion: (Netherlands) Brenda Schultz-McCarthy
- Runner-up: (South Africa) Amanda Coetzer
- Score: 6–3, 6–2

Details
- Draw: 32
- Seeds: 8

Events
Singles	Doubles
← 1995 ·	U.S. National Indoor Championships	· 1997 →

The 1996 IGA Classic singles was a women's tennis tournament. Brenda Schultz-McCarthy was the defending champion and won in the final 6–3, 6–2 against Amanda Coetzer.

== Seeds ==
A champion seed is indicated in bold text while text in italics indicates the round in which that seed was eliminated.

1. (United States) Chanda Rubin (semifinals)
2. (Netherlands) **Brenda Schultz-McCarthy (champion)**
3. (South Africa) Amanda Coetzer (final)
4. (United States) Amy Frazier (quarterfinals)
5. (United States) Lisa Raymond (quarterfinals)
6. (South Africa) Joannette Kruger (quarterfinals)
7. (Russia) Elena Likhovtseva (semifinals)
8. (Argentina) Florencia Labat (second round)

== Draw ==
=== Key ===
- Q = Qualifier
- WC = Wild card
- LL = Lucky loser
- Alt = Alternate
- ITF = ITF entry
- PR = Protected ranking
- SR = Special ranking
- SE = Special exempt
- JE = Junior exempt
- JR = Junior Accelerator Programme entrant
- CO = College Accelerator Programme entrant
- NG = Next Gen Accelerator Program entrant
- w/o = Walkover
- r = Retired
- d = Defaulted

First round
1	(United States) **C Rubin**	6	**6**	**7**
(United States) P Shriver	**7**	3	5
WC	(Bulgaria) **K Maleeva**	**6**	**6**
(Venezuela) M Vento	3	0
(China) F Li	**6**	1	3
WC	(United States) **K Adams**	2	**6**	**6**
(Australia) N Bradtke	0	**6**	5
8	(Argentina) **F Labat**	**6**	4	**7**
3	(South Africa) **A Coetzer**	**7**	**7**
(United States) T Whitlinger-Jones	6	6
Q	(Canada) **M Drake**	**7**	6	**6**
Q	(Canada) S Jeyaseelan	6	**7**	3
(United States) **S Cacic**	**6**	**6**
(United States) L Lee	4	1
(United States) S Stafford	3	4
6	(South Africa) **J Kruger**	**6**	**6**
7	(Russia) **E Likhovtseva**	3	**6**	**6**
(Mexico) A Gavaldón	**6**	1	4
(Slovakia) **J Husárová**	**6**	**7**
(United States) D Graham	2	6
(United States) **A Grossman**	3	**6**	**6**
Q	(Germany) A Glass	**6**	3	2
(Romania) C Cristea	2	3
4	(United States) **A Frazier**	**6**	**6**
5	(United States) **L Raymond**	**6**	**6**
(China) J-Q Yi	1	3
Q	(United States) **L Poruri**	2	**6**	**6**
(Argentina) I Gorrochategui	**6**	2	3
(Canada) P Hy-Boulais	**6**	4	2
(Canada) **J Nejedly**	4	**6**	**6**
(United States) L Wild	2	3
2	(Netherlands) **B Schultz-McCarthy**	**6**	**6**

Second round
1	(United States) **C Rubin**	**7**	**6**
WC	(Bulgaria) K Maleeva	6	1
WC	(United States) **K Adams**	4	**6**	**6**
8	(Argentina) F Labat	**6**	4	1
3	(South Africa) **A Coetzer**	**6**	3	**6**
Q	(Canada) M Drake	4	**6**	1
(United States) S Cacic	3	2
6	(South Africa) **J Kruger**	**6**	**6**
7	(Russia) **E Likhovtseva**	**7**	2	**7**
(Slovakia) J Husárová	5	**6**	6
(United States) A Grossman	**6**	2	3
4	(United States) **A Frazier**	2	**6**	**6**
5	(United States) **L Raymond**	**6**	**6**
Q	(United States) L Poruri	1	2
(Canada) J Nejedly	1	**7**	1
2	(Netherlands) **B Schultz-McCarthy**	**6**	5	**6**

Quarterfinals
1	(United States) **C Rubin**	4	**6**	**6**
WC	(United States) K Adams	**6**	2	1
3	(South Africa) **A Coetzer**	**6**	**6**
6	(South Africa) J Kruger	1	4
7	(Russia) **E Likhovtseva**	**7**	3	**6**
4	(United States) A Frazier	6	**6**	1
5	(United States) L Raymond	3	3
2	(Netherlands) **B Schultz-McCarthy**	**6**	**6**

Semifinals
1	(United States) C Rubin	4	4
3	(South Africa) **A Coetzer**	**6**	**6**
7	(Russia) E Likhovtseva	6	3
2	(Netherlands) **B Schultz-McCarthy**	**7**	**6**

Final
3	(South Africa) Amanda Coetzer	3	2
2	(Netherlands) **B Schultz-McCarthy**	**6**	**6**
