= 1995 IGA Tennis Classic – Doubles =

Doubles
- 1995 IGA Classic
- 1994 Champions: (United States) Patty Fendick (United States) Meredith McGrath

Final
- Champions: (United States) Nicole Arendt (Italy) Laura Golarsa
- Runners-up: (United States) Katrina Adams (Netherlands) Brenda Schultz
- Score: 6–4, 6–3

Details
- Draw: 16
- Seeds: 4

Events
Singles	Doubles
← 1994 ·	IGA Classic	· 1996 →

Patty Fendick and Meredith McGrath were the defending champions but only Fendick competed that year with Lisa Raymond.

Fendick and Raymond lost in the semifinals to Katrina Adams and Brenda Schultz.

Nicole Arendt and Laura Golarsa won in the final 6–4, 6–3 against Adams and Schultz.

== Seeds ==
Champion seeds are indicated in bold text while text in italics indicates the round in which those seeds were eliminated.

1. (United States) Patty Fendick / (United States) Lisa Raymond (semifinals)
2. (United States) **Nicole Arendt** / (Italy) **Laura Golarsa (champions)**
3. (United States) Katrina Adams / (Netherlands) Brenda Schultz (final)
4. (South Africa) Amanda Coetzer / (South Africa) Elna Reinach (first round)

== Draw ==
=== Key ===
- Q = Qualifier
- WC = Wild card
- LL = Lucky loser
- Alt = Alternate
- SE = Special exempt
- PR = Protected ranking
- ITF = ITF entry
- JE = Junior exempt
- w/o = Walkover
- r = Retired
- d = Defaulted
- SR = Special ranking

First round
1	(United States) **P Fendick** (United States) **L Raymond**	**6**	**6**
(France) S Amiach (United States) V Paynter	3	1
(United States) **E Hakami** (Austria) **B Reinstadler**	**6**	2	**6**
WC	(United States) L Lee (United States) M Norwood	4	**6**	2
3	(United States) **K Adams** (Netherlands) **B Schultz**	**7**	**6**
(Chile) P Cabezas (Germany) M Zivec-Skulj	6	2
(Belgium) L Courtois (Russia) E Likhovtseva	5	6
Q	(United States) **E deLone** (United States) **A Keller**	**7**	**7**
(Georgia (country)) N Louarsabishvili (United States) L Poruri	4	2
(Belgium) **D Monami** (Hungary) **A Temesvári**	**6**	**6**
(Australia) **N Bradtke** (Australia) **K Radford**	**6**	**7**
4	(South Africa) A Coetzer (South Africa) E Reinach	4	5
(Canada) **M Bernard** (Canada) **C Delisle**	**6**	**6**
(Romania) C Cristea (Federal Republic of Yugoslavia) T Ječmenica	2	1
(United States) S McCarthy (United States) J Steven	**6**	3	3
2	(United States) **N Arendt** (Italy) **L Golarsa**	2	**6**	**6**

Quarterfinals
1	(United States) **P Fendick** (United States) **L Raymond**	**6**	**6**
(United States) E Hakami (Austria) B Reinstadler	1	1
3	(United States) **K Adams** (Netherlands) **B Schultz**	**6**	**6**
Q	(United States) E deLone (United States) A Keller	2	3
(Belgium) D Monami (Hungary) A Temesvári	2	4
(Australia) **N Bradtke** (Australia) **K Radford**	**6**	**6**
(Canada) M Bernard (Canada) C Delisle	1	2
2	(United States) **N Arendt** (Italy) **L Golarsa**	**6**	**6**

Semifinals
1	(United States) P Fendick (United States) L Raymond	5	**6**	5
3	(United States) **K Adams** (Netherlands) **B Schultz**	**7**	4	**7**
(Australia) N Bradtke (Australia) K Radford	3	6
2	(United States) **N Arendt** (Italy) **L Golarsa**	**6**	**7**

Final
3	(United States) Katrina Adams (Netherlands) Brenda Schultz	4	3
2	(United States) **Nicole Arendt** (Italy) **Laura Golarsa**	**6**	**6**
