= 2004 Cellular South Cup – Doubles =

Doubles
- 2004 Kroger St. Jude International and the Cellular South Cup

Final
- Champions: (Sweden) Åsa Svensson (United States) Meilen Tu
- Runners-up: (Russia) Maria Sharapova (Russia) Vera Zvonareva
- Score: 6–4, 7–6^{(7–0)}

Details
- Draw: 16
- Seeds: 4

Events
Singles	men	women
Doubles	men	women
← 2003 ·	Kroger St. Jude International	· 2005 →
← 2003 ·	Cellular South Cup	· 2005 →

Akiko Morigami and Saori Obata were the defending champions, but Obata decided to compete in Hyderabad that week. Morigami teamed up with Alina Jidkova and lost in the first round to Gisela Dulko and Patricia Tarabini.

Åsa Svensson and Meilen Tu won the title by defeating Maria Sharapova and Vera Zvonareva 6–4, 7–6^{(7–0)} in the final.

== Seeds ==
1. (Italy) Tathiana Garbin / (Italy) Rita Grande (first round)
2. (Sweden) Åsa Svensson / (United States) Meilen Tu (champions)
3. (Russia) Alina Jidkova / (Japan) Akiko Morigami (first round)
4. (Australia) Lisa McShea / (Australia) Trudi Musgrave (quarterfinals)

== Draw ==
=== Key ===
- Q = Qualifier
- WC = Wild card
- LL = Lucky loser
- Alt = Alternate
- SE = Special exempt
- PR = Protected ranking
- ITF = ITF entry
- JE = Junior exempt
- w/o = Walkover
- r = Retired
- d = Defaulted
- SR = Special ranking

=== Draw ===
First round
1	(Italy) T Garbin (Italy) R Grande	6^{4}	6^{5}
(Italy) F Pennetta (Argentina) ME Salerni	7^{7}	7^{7}
WC	(United States) C Gullickson (United States) S Perry	3	2
(United States) J Embry (United States) M Washington	6	6
3	(Russia) A Jidkova (Japan) A Morigami	5	1
(Argentina) G Dulko (Argentina) P Tarabini	7	6
(Russia) M Sharapova (Russia) V Zvonareva	6	6^{8}	6
(Russia) T Panova (Russia) G Voskoboeva	4	7^{10}	4
(Spain) C Martínez Granados (Croatia) S Talaja	1	2
(United States) L Granville (United States) A Spears	6	6
Q	(Czech Republic) E Fislová (Czech Republic) B Strýcová	7^{7}	6^{5}	4
4	(Australia) L McShea (Australia) T Musgrave	6^{2}	7^{7}	6
(United States) A Augustus (South Africa) N Grandin	4	3
(United States) J Hopkins (Japan) N Miyagi	6	6
(Australia) B Stewart (Australia) S Stosur	0	1
2	(Sweden) Å Svensson (United States) M Tu	6	6

Quarterfinals
(Italy) F Pennetta (Argentina) ME Salerni	7	3	2
(United States) J Embry (United States) M Washington	5	6	6
(Argentina) G Dulko (Argentina) P Tarabini	4	2
(Russia) M Sharapova (Russia) V Zvonareva	6	6
(United States) L Granville (United States) A Spears	6	6
4	(Australia) L McShea (Australia) T Musgrave	2	0
(United States) J Hopkins (Japan) N Miyagi	4	7^{7}	5
2	(Sweden) Å Svensson (United States) M Tu	6	6^{2}	7

Semifinals
(United States) J Embry (United States) M Washington	2	7	3
(Russia) M Sharapova (Russia) V Zvonareva	6	5	6
(United States) L Granville (United States) A Spears	4	6	6^{5}
2	(Sweden) Å Svensson (United States) M Tu	6	3	7^{7}

Final
(Russia) M Sharapova (Russia) V Zvonareva	4	6^{0}
2	(Sweden) Å Svensson (United States) M Tu	6	7^{7}
