= 2004 Kroger St. Jude International – Doubles =

Doubles
- 2004 Kroger St. Jude International and the Cellular South Cup

Final
- Champions: (United States) Bob Bryan (United States) Mike Bryan
- Runners-up: (South Africa) Jeff Coetzee (South Africa) Chris Haggard
- Score: 6–3, 6–4

Details
- Draw: 16
- Seeds: 4

Events
Singles	men	women
Doubles	men	women
← 2003 ·	Kroger St. Jude International	· 2005 →
← 2003 ·	Cellular South Cup	· 2005 →

Mark Knowles and Daniel Nestor were the defending champions but lost in the first round to Nicolas Kiefer and Wesley Moodie.

Bob Bryan and Mike Bryan won in the final 6–3, 6–4 against Jeff Coetzee and Chris Haggard.

== Seeds ==
1. (United States) Bob Bryan / (United States) Mike Bryan (champions)
2. (The Bahamas) Mark Knowles / (Canada) Daniel Nestor (first round)
3. (United States) Scott Humphries / (The Bahamas) Mark Merklein (first round)
4. (South Africa) Robbie Koenig / (United States) Rick Leach (first round)

== Draw ==
=== Key ===
- Q = Qualifier
- WC = Wild card
- LL = Lucky loser
- Alt = Alternate
- SE = Special exempt
- PR = Protected ranking
- ITF = ITF entry
- JE = Junior exempt
- w/o = Walkover
- r = Retired
- d = Defaulted
- SR = Special ranking

First round
1	(United States) B Bryan (United States) M Bryan	7	7^{7}
(United States) R Ginepri (United States) B MacPhie	5	6^{2}
(United States) J Blake (United States) M Fish	6	6
(Germany) L Burgsmüller (Germany) A Popp	4	3
4	(South Africa) R Koenig (United States) R Leach	6	3	4
(Australia) J Kerr (United States) J Thomas	4	6	6
WC	(Germany) T Haas (United States) G Weiner	6	6
(Germany) K Braasch (Austria) J Melzer	3	3
WC	(Russia) D Tursunov (United States) B Vahaly	4	6	4
(Belgium) X Malisse (Belgium) T Vanhoudt	6	3	6
(South Africa) J Coetzee (South Africa) C Haggard	6	6
3	(United States) S Humphries (The Bahamas) M Merklein	3	3
(Australia) T Perry (Japan) T Shimada	6^{8}	4
(United States) J-M Gambill (United States) T Parrott	7^{10}	6
(Germany) N Kiefer (South Africa) W Moodie	6^{6}	7^{7}	6
2	(The Bahamas) M Knowles (Canada) D Nestor	7^{8}	6^{4}	3

Quarterfinals
1	(United States) B Bryan (United States) M Bryan	w/o
(United States) J Blake (United States) M Fish
(Australia) J Kerr (United States) J Thomas	6	2^{r}
WC	(Germany) T Haas (United States) G Weiner	3	3
(Belgium) X Malisse (Belgium) T Vanhoudt	4	2
(South Africa) J Coetzee (South Africa) C Haggard	6	6
(United States) J-M Gambill (United States) T Parrott	7	7
(Germany) N Kiefer (South Africa) W Moodie	5	5

Semifinals
1	(United States) B Bryan (United States) M Bryan	6	3	6
WC	(Germany) T Haas (United States) G Weiner	3	6	2
(South Africa) J Coetzee (South Africa) C Haggard	7^{7}	4	7
(United States) J-M Gambill (United States) T Parrott	6^{5}	6	5

Final
1	(United States) B Bryan (United States) M Bryan	6	6
(South Africa) J Coetzee (South Africa) C Haggard	3	4
