= 2005 Regions Morgan Keegan Championships – Doubles =

Doubles
- 2005 Regions Morgan Keegan Championships and the Cellular South Cup

Final
- Champions: (Sweden) Simon Aspelin (Australia) Todd Perry
- Runners-up: (United States) Bob Bryan (United States) Mike Bryan
- Score: 6–4, 6–4

Events
| Singles | men | women |
| Doubles | men | women |
| ← 2004 · | Regions Morgan Keegan Championships | · 2006 → |
| ← 2004 · | Cellular South Cup | · 2006 → |

Bob Bryan and Mike Bryan were the defending champions, but lost in the final 6–4, 6–4 to tournament winners Simon Aspelin and Todd Perry.

== Seeds ==
1. (United States) Bob Bryan / (United States) Mike Bryan (final)
2. (Sweden) Jonas Björkman / (Belarus) Max Mirnyi (semifinals)
3. (Australia) Wayne Arthurs / (Australia) Paul Hanley (semifinals)
4. (Sweden) Simon Aspelin / (Australia) Todd Perry (champions)

== Draw ==
=== Key ===
- Q = Qualifier
- WC = Wild card
- LL = Lucky loser
- Alt = Alternate
- SE = Special exempt
- PR = Protected ranking
- ITF = ITF entry
- JE = Junior exempt
- w/o = Walkover
- r = Retired
- d = Defaulted
- SR = Special ranking

=== Draw ===
First round
1 | (United States) B Bryan (United States) M Bryan | 6 | 6
WC | (United States) A Delić (United States) T Phillips | 3 | 4
WC | (United States) JM Gambill (United States) R Ginepri | 7 | 7
Alt | (France) A Dupuis (Czech Republic) T Zíb | 5 | 5
3 | (Australia) W Arthurs (Australia) P Hanley | 7 | 6
(Belgium) X Malisse (Belgium) T Vanhoudt | 5 | 4
(Czech Republic) J Levinský (Czech Republic) J Novák | 6 | 6
(South Africa) C Haggard (Australia) J Kerr | 2 | 3
(United States) K Kim (United States) G Oliver | 7^{7} | 6
(France) G Carraz (France) C Saulnier | 6^{4} | 3
(Switzerland) Y Allegro (Germany) M Kohlmann | 3 | 7 | 2
4 | (Sweden) S Aspelin (Australia) T Perry | 6 | 5 | 6
(Georgia (country)) I Labadze (South Korea) H-t Lee | 6^{5} | 7 | 6
(United States) R Leach (United States) B MacPhie | 7^{7} | 5 | 3
(Australia) A Fisher (United States) T Parrott | 3 | 6 | 2
2 | (Sweden) J Björkman (Belarus) M Mirnyi | 6 | 3 | 6

Quarterfinals
1 | (United States) B Bryan (United States) M Bryan | 3 | 6 | 6
WC | (United States) JM Gambill (United States) R Ginepri | 6 | 3 | 4
3 | (Australia) W Arthurs (Australia) P Hanley | 6 | 6
(Czech Republic) J Levinský (Czech Republic) J Novák | 3 | 2
(United States) K Kim (United States) G Oliver | 3 | 2
4 | (Sweden) S Aspelin (Australia) T Perry | 6 | 6
(Georgia (country)) I Labadze (South Korea) H-t Lee | 0 | 3
2 | (Sweden) J Björkman (Belarus) M Mirnyi | 6 | 6

Semifinals
1 | (United States) B Bryan (United States) M Bryan | 6 | 3 | 7^{8}
3 | (Australia) W Arthurs (Australia) P Hanley | 4 | 6 | 6^{6}
4 | (Sweden) S Aspelin (Australia) T Perry | 7^{7} | 6
2 | (Sweden) J Björkman (Belarus) M Mirnyi | 6^{5} | 3

Final
1 | (United States) B Bryan (United States) M Bryan | 4 | 4
4 | (Sweden) S Aspelin (Australia) T Perry | 6 | 6
