= 2005 Cellular South Cup – Doubles =

Doubles
- 2005 Regions Morgan Keegan Championships and the Cellular South Cup

Final
- Champions: (Japan) Miho Saeki (Japan) Yuka Yoshida
- Runners-up: (United States) Laura Granville (United States) Abigail Spears
- Score: 6–3, 6–4

Details
- Draw: 16
- Seeds: 4

Events
Singles	men	women
Doubles	men	women
← 2004 ·	Regions Morgan Keegan Championships	· 2006 →
← 2004 ·	Cellular South Cup	· 2006 →

Åsa Svensson and Meilen Tu were the defending champions, but Svensson was no longer active in the WTA Tour, having played her last professional match in October 2004. Tu partnered with Teryn Ashley and lost in first round to Yuliya Beygelzimer and Alina Jidkova.

Miho Saeki and Yuka Yoshida won the title by defeating Laura Granville and Abigail Spears 6–3, 6–4 in the final.

== Seeds ==
1. (United States) Jill Craybas / (Australia) Lisa McShea (first round)
2. (United States) Jennifer Hopkins / (United States) Mashona Washington (first round)
3. (United States) Laura Granville / (United States) Abigail Spears (final)
4. (United States) Teryn Ashley / (United States) Meilen Tu (first round)

== Draw ==
=== Key ===
- Q = Qualifier
- WC = Wild card
- LL = Lucky loser
- Alt = Alternate
- SE = Special exempt
- PR = Protected ranking
- ITF = ITF entry
- JE = Junior exempt
- w/o = Walkover
- r = Retired
- d = Defaulted
- SR = Special ranking

=== Draw ===
First round
1	(United States) J Craybas (Australia) L McShea	6	4	1
(United States) L Lee-Waters (United States) K Smashey	4	6	6
Q	(Japan) M Saeki (Japan) Y Yoshida	7^{8}	3	7
(United States) J Ditty (Czech Republic) V Uhlířová	6^{6}	6	5
4	(United States) T Ashley (United States) M Tu	6^{4}	0
(Ukraine) Y Beygelzimer (Russia) A Jidkova	7^{7}	6
PR	(South Korea) Y-j Cho (South Korea) M-r Jeon	4	5
(Netherlands) M Krajicek (Czech Republic) M Paštiková	6	7
(South Africa) N Grandin (United States) K McCain	4	7	7^{8}
WC	(Puerto Rico) K Brandi (South Africa) K Grant	6	5	6^{6}
(Slovakia) E Fislová (Slovakia) S Hrozenská	1	1
3	(United States) L Granville (United States) A Spears	6	6
(France) S Beltrame (United States) L Osterloh	6	3	7^{7}
(Ukraine) K Bondarenko (Russia) E Vesnina	3	6	6^{5}
(Italy) Ad Serra Zanetti (Italy) An Serra Zanetti	6	6
2	(United States) J Hopkins (United States) M Washington	4	4

Quarterfinals
(United States) L Lee-Waters (United States) K Smashey	6	1	4
Q	(Japan) M Saeki (Japan) Y Yoshida	4	6	6
(Ukraine) Y Beygelzimer (Russia) A Jidkova	6	2
(Netherlands) M Krajicek (Czech Republic) M Paštiková	1	0^{r}
(South Africa) N Grandin (United States) K McCain	6	4	6^{3}
3	(United States) L Granville (United States) A Spears	4	6	7^{7}
(France) S Beltrame (United States) L Osterloh
(Italy) Ad Serra Zanetti (Italy) An Serra Zanetti	w/o

Semifinals
Q	(Japan) M Saeki (Japan) Y Yoshida	6^{4}	6	7^{7}
(Ukraine) Y Beygelzimer (Russia) A Jidkova	7^{7}	3	6^{3}
3	(United States) L Granville (United States) A Spears	6	5	6
(Italy) Ad Serra Zanetti (Italy) An Serra Zanetti	4	7	4

Final
Q	(Japan) M Saeki (Japan) Y Yoshida	6	6
3	(United States) L Granville (United States) A Spears	3	4
