= 2003 Kroger St. Jude International – Men's singles =

Men's singles
- 2003 Kroger St. Jude International

Final
- Champion: (United States) Taylor Dent
- Runner-up: (United States) Andy Roddick
- Score: 6–1, 6–4

Details
- Draw: 32
- Seeds: 8

Events
| Singles | men | women |
| Doubles | men | women |
| ← 2002 · | U.S. National Indoor Championships | · 2004 → |

Andy Roddick was the defending champion but lost in the final 6–1, 6–4 against Taylor Dent.

== Seeds ==
A champion seed is indicated in bold text while text in italics indicates the round in which that seed was eliminated.

1. (United States) Andy Roddick (final)
2. (Thailand) Paradorn Srichaphan (second round)
3. (United States) James Blake (second round)
4. (South Africa) Wayne Ferreira (first round)
5. (United States) Jan-Michael Gambill (second round)
6. (United States) Todd Martin (first round)
7. (Russia) Nikolay Davydenko (first round)
8. (Denmark) Kenneth Carlsen (first round)

== Draw ==
=== Key ===
- Q = Qualifier
- WC = Wild card
- LL = Lucky loser
- Alt = Alternate
- SE = Special exempt
- PR = Protected ranking
- ITF = ITF entry
- JE = Junior exempt
- w/o = Walkover
- r = Retired
- d = Defaulted
- SR = Special ranking

First round
1 | (United States) **A Roddick** | **6** | **6**
Q | (United States) C Mamiit | 4 | 4
(United States) J Gimelstob | 3 | 4
(South Korea) **H-T Lee** | **6** | **6**
(Armenia) S Sargsian | 3 | 4
(United States) **R Ginepri** | **6** | **6**
(Italy) **D Sanguinetti** | **7^{7}** | **6**
6 | (United States) T Martin | 6^{1} | 3
3 | (United States) **J Blake** | **6** | **6**
(Czech Republic) J Vaněk | 3 | 0
(Monaco) J-R Lisnard | 5 | 4
(Georgia (country)) **I Labadze** | **7** | **6**
(Germany) L Burgsmüller | 3 | 4
(United States) **B Vahaly** | **6** | **6**
Q | (United States) **E Taino** | 6^{4} | **6** | **6**
8 | (Denmark) K Carlsen | **7^{7}** | 4 | 4
5 | (United States) **J-M Gambill** | 4 | **6** | **6**
(Croatia) Ž Krajan | **6** | 3 | 4
(Australia) M Philippoussis | 6^{15} | 1
(United States) **T Dent** | **7^{17}** | **6**
(Belarus) **V Voltchkov** | **6** | **6**
WC | (United States) B Bryan | 3 | 3
(United States) **J Morrison** | **7** | **6**
4 | (South Africa) W Ferreira | 5 | 4
7 | (Russia) N Davydenko | **6** | r
Q | (Sweden) **M Norman** | 4
WC | (United States) B Baker | 2 | 0
(United States) **V Spadea** | **6** | **6**
Q | (France) J Varlet | **6** | 6^{5} | 4
(United States) **M Fish** | 3 | **7^{7}** | **6**
WC | (United States) M Chang | 4 | 2
2 | (Thailand) **P Srichaphan** | **6** | **6**

Second round
1 | (United States) **A Roddick** | 5 | **6** | **7^{7}**
(South Korea) H-T Lee | **7** | 4 | 6^{3}
(United States) **R Ginepri** | **6** | **7^{7}**
(Italy) D Sanguinetti | 3 | 6^{5}
3 | (United States) J Blake | 6^{2} | 5
(Georgia (country)) **I Labadze** | **7^{7}** | **7**
(United States) **B Vahaly** | **6** | **6**
Q | (United States) E Taino | 2 | 4
5 | (United States) J-M Gambill | 6^{8} | 6^{4}
(United States) **T Dent** | **7^{10}** | **7^{7}**
(Belarus) **V Voltchkov** | **6** | 4 | **6**
(United States) J Morrison | 2 | **6** | 4
Q | (Sweden) M Norman | 4 | 4
(United States) **V Spadea** | **6** | **6**
(United States) **M Fish** | 6^{4} | **7^{7}** | **6**
2 | (Thailand) P Srichaphan | **7^{7}** | 6^{5} | 1

Quarterfinals
1 | (United States) **A Roddick** | **6** | **6**
(United States) R Ginepri | 4 | 4
(Georgia (country)) I Labadze | 3 | **6** | 4
(United States) **B Vahaly** | **6** | 4 | **6**
(United States) **T Dent** | **7^{7}** | **6**
(Belarus) V Voltchkov | 6^{1} | 2
(United States) **V Spadea** | **6** | 4 | **6**
(United States) M Fish | 2 | **6** | 3

Semifinals
1 | (United States) **A Roddick** | **7** | **6**
(United States) B Vahaly | 5 | 1
(United States) **T Dent** | **6** | **6**
(United States) V Spadea | 2 | 4

Final
1 | (United States) Andy Roddick | 1 | 4
(United States) **Taylor Dent** | **6** | **6**
