= 1997 IGA Tennis Classic – Singles =

Singles
- 1997 IGA Tennis Classic
- 1996 Champion: (Netherlands) Brenda Schultz-McCarthy

Final
- Champion: (United States) Lindsay Davenport
- Runner-up: (United States) Lisa Raymond
- Score: 6–4, 6–2

Details
- Draw: 30
- Seeds: 8

Events
Singles	Doubles
← 1996 ·	IGA Tennis Classic	· 1998 →

Brenda Schultz-McCarthy was the defending champion but did not compete that year.

Lindsay Davenport won in the final 6–4, 6–2 against Lisa Raymond.

== Seeds ==
A champion seed is indicated in bold text while text in italics indicates the round in which that seed was eliminated. The top two seeds received a bye to the second round.

1. (United States) **Lindsay Davenport (champion)**
2. (South Africa) Amanda Coetzer (quarterfinals)
3. (United States) Kimberly Po (semifinals)
4. (United States) Lisa Raymond (final)
5. (United States) Jennifer Capriati (quarterfinals)
6. (United States) Amy Frazier (first round)
7. (United States) Marianne Werdel-Witmeyer (second round)
8. (Canada) Patricia Hy-Boulais (first round)

== Draw ==
=== Key ===
- Q = Qualifier
- WC = Wild card
- LL = Lucky loser
- Alt = Alternate
- ITF = ITF entry
- PR = Protected ranking
- SR = Special ranking
- SE = Special exempt
- JE = Junior exempt
- JR = Junior Accelerator Programme entrant
- CO = College Accelerator Programme entrant
- NG = Next Gen Accelerator Program entrant
- w/o = Walkover
- r = Retired
- d = Defaulted

=== Final ===
Final
1	(United States) **Lindsay Davenport**	**6**	**6**
4	(United States) Lisa Raymond	4	2

=== Section 1 ===
First round
(Romania) **C Cristea**	**6**	**6**
(United States) J Watanabe	4	2
(United States) A Grossman	4	6
Q	(Japan) **K Nagatsuka**	**6**	**7**
Q	(Venezuela) M Vento	3	4
5	(United States) **J Capriati**	**6**	**6**
3	(United States) **K Po**	**7**	**6**
(United States) T Whitlinger-Jones	6	4
Q	(Australia) K Radford	4	2
(United States) **L Lee**	**6**	**6**
(United States) **S Cacic**	**7**	**6**
WC	(United States) K Adams	6	2
(Japan) N Miyagi	**6**	5	r
7	(United States) **M Werdel-Witmeyer**	4	**3**

Second round
1	(United States) **L Davenport**	**6**	**6**
(Romania) C Cristea	1	2
Q	(Japan) K Nagatsuka	3	2
5	(United States) **J Capriati**	**6**	**6**
3	(United States) **K Po**	**6**	**6**
(United States) L Lee	1	4
(United States) **S Cacic**	**6**	**6**
7	(United States) M Werdel-Witmeyer	4	3

Quarterfinals
1	(United States) **L Davenport**	**6**	**6**
5	(United States) J Capriati	3	4
3	(United States) **K Po**	**6**	**6**
(United States) S Cacic	3	3

Semifinals
1	(United States) **L Davenport**	1	**6**	**6**
3	(United States) K Po	**6**	2	3

=== Section 2 ===
First round
8	(Canada) P Hy-Boulais	5	**7**	3
WC	(United States) **P Shriver**	**7**	6	**6**
(Japan) R Hiraki	2	**6**	3
(Canada) **R Simpson**	**6**	3	**6**
(France) **A Dechaume-Balleret**	**6**	**6**
(United States) G Helgeson-Nielsen	4	4
(Austria) K Kschwendt	**7**	2	5
4	(United States) **L Raymond**	5	**6**	**7**
6	(United States) A Frazier	6	5
(Italy) **F Lubiani**	**7**	**7**
(Poland) **M Grzybowska**	**7**	3	**6**
LL	(Ukraine) E Brioukhovets	6	**6**	3
Q	(Mexico) A Gavaldón	2	**6**	5
(United States) **M Tu**	**6**	2	**7**

Second round
WC	(United States) **P Shriver**	**6**	**6**
(Canada) R Simpson	4	3
(France) A Dechaume-Balleret	4	3
4	(United States) **L Raymond**	**6**	**6**
(Italy) **F Lubiani**	**6**	**7**
(Poland) M Grzybowska	1	5
(United States) M Tu	1	0
2	(South Africa) **A Coetzer**	**6**	**6**

Quarterfinals
WC	(United States) P Shriver	5	6
4	(United States) **L Raymond**	**7**	**7**
(Italy) **F Lubiani**	**6**	**6**
2	(South Africa) A Coetzer	0	4

Semifinals
4	(United States) **L Raymond**	**6**	**6**
(Italy) F Lubiani	1	0
