= 1996 IGA Tennis Classic – Doubles =

Doubles
- 1996 IGA Tennis Classic
- 1995 Champions: (United States) Nicole Arendt (Italy) Laura Golarsa

Final
- Champions: (United States) Chanda Rubin (Netherlands) Brenda Schultz-McCarthy
- Runners-up: (United States) Katrina Adams (United States) Debbie Graham
- Score: 6–4, 6–3

Details
- Draw: 16
- Seeds: 4

Events
Singles	Doubles
← 1995 ·	U.S. National Indoor Championships	· 1997 →

Nicole Arendt and Laura Golarsa were the defending champions but did not compete that year.

Chanda Rubin and Brenda Schultz-McCarthy won in the final 6–4, 6–3 against Katrina Adams and Debbie Graham.

== Seeds ==
Champion seeds are indicated in bold text while text in italics indicates the round in which those seeds were eliminated.

1. (United States) **Chanda Rubin** / (Netherlands) **Brenda Schultz-McCarthy (champions)**
2. (South Africa) Amanda Coetzer / (United States) Linda Wild (first round)
3. (Australia) Nicole Bradtke / (Argentina) Inés Gorrochategui (semifinals)
4. (United States) Amy Frazier / (United States) Kimberly Po (semifinals)

== Draw ==
=== Key ===
- Q = Qualifier
- WC = Wild card
- LL = Lucky loser
- Alt = Alternate
- ITF = ITF entry
- PR = Protected ranking
- SR = Special ranking
- SE = Special exempt
- JE = Junior exempt
- JR = Junior Accelerator Programme entrant
- CO = College Accelerator Programme entrant
- NG = Next Gen Accelerator Program entrant
- w/o = Walkover
- r = Retired
- d = Defaulted

First round
1	(United States) **C Rubin** (Netherlands) **B Schultz-McCarthy**	**6**	**6**
(Canada) M Bernard (Canada) C Delisle	1	2
(United States) E deLone (United States) A Keller	1	4
Q	(Russia) **A Kournikova** (Czech Republic) **L Varmužová**	**6**	**6**
4	(United States) **A Frazier** (United States) **K Po**	**6**	**6**
(Romania) C Cristea (United States) D Scott	3	3
(Russia) **E Likhovtseva** (United States) **L Poruri**	**6**	3	**7**
(United States) S Reece (United States) T Whitlinger-Jones	4	**6**	5
(United States) A Grossman (Argentina) F Labat	2	**6**	2
(Canada) **S Jeyaseelan** (Australia) **T Morton-Rodgers**	**6**	2	**6**
(United States) E Hakami (Croatia) M Murić	1	0
3	(Australia) **N Bradtke** (Argentina) **I Gorrochategui**	**6**	**6**
(Bulgaria) K Maleeva (United States) S Stafford	5	**6**	6
(United States) **L Lee** (Canada) **R Simpson**	**7**	1	**7**
(United States) **K Adams** (United States) **D Graham**	**6**	**6**
2	(South Africa) A Coetzer (United States) L Wild	2	4

Quarterfinals
1	(United States) **C Rubin** (Netherlands) **B Schultz-McCarthy**	**7**	**6**
Q	(Russia) A Kournikova (Czech Republic) L Varmužová	5	1
4	(United States) **A Frazier** (United States) **K Po**	**7**	**6**
(Russia) E Likhovtseva (United States) L Poruri	5	4
(Canada) S Jeyaseelan (Australia) T Morton-Rodgers	6	2
3	(Australia) **N Bradtke** (Argentina) **I Gorrochategui**	**6**	**6**
(United States) L Lee (Canada) R Simpson	4	2
(United States) **K Adams** (United States) **D Graham**	**6**	**6**

Semifinals
1	(United States) **C Rubin** (Netherlands) **B Schultz-McCarthy**	6	**6**	**6**
4	(United States) A Frazier (United States) K Po	**7**	2	3
3	(Australia) N Bradtke (Argentina) I Gorrochategui	2	4
(United States) **K Adams** (United States) **D Graham**	**6**	**6**

Final
1	(United States) **Chanda Rubin** (Netherlands) **Brenda Schultz-McCarthy**	**6**	**6**
(United States) Katrina Adams (United States) Debbie Graham	4	3
