= 1997 IGA Tennis Classic – Doubles =

Doubles
- 1997 IGA Tennis Classic
- 1996 Champions: (United States) Chanda Rubin (Netherlands) Brenda Schultz-McCarthy

Final
- Champions: (Japan) Rika Hiraki (Japan) Nana Miyagi
- Runners-up: (United States) Marianne Werdel-Witmeyer (United States) Tami Whitlinger-Jones
- Score: 6–4, 6–1

Details
- Draw: 16
- Seeds: 4

Events
Singles	Doubles
← 1996 ·	IGA Tennis Classic	· 1998 →

Chanda Rubin and Brenda Schultz-McCarthy were the defending champions but did not compete that year.

Rika Hiraki and Nana Miyagi won in the final 6–4, 6–1 against Marianne Werdel-Witmeyer and Tami Whitlinger-Jones.

== Seeds ==
Champion seeds are indicated in bold text while text in italics indicates the round in which those seeds were eliminated.

1. (South Africa) Amanda Coetzer / (United States) Lindsay Davenport (first round)
2. (United States) Amy Frazier / (United States) Kimberly Po (semifinals)
3. (United States) Katrina Adams / (South Africa) Mariaan de Swardt (first round)
4. (Japan) **Rika Hiraki** / (Japan) **Nana Miyagi (champions)**

== Draw ==
=== Key ===
- Q = Qualifier
- WC = Wild card
- LL = Lucky loser
- Alt = Alternate
- ITF = ITF entry
- PR = Protected ranking
- SR = Special ranking
- SE = Special exempt
- JE = Junior exempt
- JR = Junior Accelerator Programme entrant
- CO = College Accelerator Programme entrant
- NG = Next Gen Accelerator Program entrant
- w/o = Walkover
- r = Retired
- d = Defaulted

First round
1	(South Africa) A Coetzer (United States) L Davenport	4	5
WC	(Chinese Taipei) **J Lee** (United States) **L Lee**	**6**	**7**
(Canada) **P Hy-Boulais** (Austria) **K Kschwendt**	**6**	**6**
(South Africa) L Horn (Australia) D Jones	4	4
3	(United States) K Adams (South Africa) M de Swardt	4	5
(United States) **M Werdel-Witmeyer** (United States) **T Whitlinger-Jones**	**6**	**7**
(United States) A Grossman (United States) G Helgeson-Nielsen	2	6
(United States) **D Graham** (Australia) **K Radford**	**6**	**7**
Q	(Ukraine) E Brioukhovets (Canada) M Drake	3	3
(United States) **E Hakami** (United Kingdom) **V Lake**	**6**	**6**
(United States) A Lettiere (United States) P Shriver	3	**6**	3
4	(Japan) **R Hiraki** (Japan) **N Miyagi**	**6**	4	**6**
(United States) E deLone (Australia) N Pratt	1	5
(Romania) **C Cristea** (Poland) **M Grzybowska**	**6**	**7**
(France) A Dechaume-Balleret (Canada) R Simpson	4	3
2	(United States) **A Frazier** (United States) **K Po**	**6**	**6**

Quarterfinals
WC	(Chinese Taipei) **J Lee** (United States) **L Lee**	6	**6**	**7**
(Canada) P Hy-Boulais (Austria) K Kschwendt	**7**	0	6
(United States) **M Werdel-Witmeyer** (United States) **T Whitlinger-Jones**	5	**6**	**7**
(United States) D Graham (Australia) K Radford	**7**	3	6
(United States) E Hakami (United Kingdom) V Lake	1	5
4	(Japan) **R Hiraki** (Japan) **N Miyagi**	**6**	**7**
(Romania) C Cristea (Poland) M Grzybowska	1	3
2	(United States) **A Frazier** (United States) **K Po**	**6**	**6**

Semifinals
WC	(Chinese Taipei) J Lee (United States) L Lee	4	4
(United States) **M Werdel-Witmeyer** (United States) **T Whitlinger-Jones**	**6**	**6**
4	(Japan) **R Hiraki** (Japan) **N Miyagi**	**6**	4	**6**
2	(United States) A Frazier (United States) K Po	4	**6**	3

Final
(United States) Marianne Werdel-Witmeyer (United States) Tami Whitlinger-Jones	4	1
4	(Japan) **Rika Hiraki** (Japan) **Nana Miyagi**	**6**	**6**
