= 1994 IGA Tennis Classic – Singles =

Singles
- 1994 IGA Classic
- 1993 Champion: (United States) Zina Garrison-Jackson

Final
- Champion: (United States) Meredith McGrath
- Runner-up: (Netherlands) Brenda Schultz
- Score: 7–6, 7–6

Details
- Draw: 32
- Seeds: 8

Events
Singles	Doubles
← 1993 ·	IGA Classic	· 1995 →

Zina Garrison-Jackson was the defending champion but lost in the semifinals to Brenda Schultz.

Meredith McGrath won in the final 7–6, 7–6 against Schultz.

== Seeds ==
A champion seed is indicated in bold text while text in italics indicates the round in which that seed was eliminated.

1. (United States) Zina Garrison-Jackson (quarterfinals)
2. (South Africa) Amanda Coetzer (second round)
3. (United States) Patty Fendick (quarterfinals)
4. (United States) Lori McNeil (second round)
5. (United States) Ann Grossman (second round)
6. (Netherlands) Brenda Schultz (final)
7. (United States) Amy Frazier (semifinals)
8. (United States) Linda Harvey-Wild (second round)

== Draw ==
=== Key ===
- Q = Qualifier
- WC = Wild card
- LL = Lucky loser
- Alt = Alternate
- SE = Special exempt
- PR = Protected ranking
- ITF = ITF entry
- JE = Junior exempt
- w/o = Walkover
- r = Retired
- d = Defaulted
- SR = Special ranking

First round
1	(United States) **Z Garrison-Jackson**	**6**	**6**
(Romania) C Cristea	0	4
(United States) **T Austin**	1	**6**	**6**
(United Kingdom) M Javer	**6**	0	3
Q	(United States) A Miller	**6**	2	1
(United States) **K Adams**	4	**6**	**6**
(United States) T Whitlinger	4	**6**	6
8	(United States) **L Harvey-Wild**	**6**	1	**7**
4	(United States) **L McNeil**	**6**	**6**
(Canada) R Simpson-Alter	3	1
(United States) **S Cacic**	**7**	3	**6**
(Belarus) T Ignatieva	6	**6**	4
WC	(United States) **J Steven**	**6**	**6**
Q	(United States) N London	3	2
(Netherlands) M Bollegraf	2	4
6	(Netherlands) **B Schultz**	**6**	**6**
7	(United States) **A Frazier**	**6**	**6**
(United States) S McCarthy	4	1
(Ukraine) E Brioukhovets	2	2
(Mexico) **A Gavaldón**	**6**	**6**
(Slovakia) **R Zrubáková**	**6**	**6**
Q	(Sri Lanka) L Weerasuriya	3	2
(United States) J Watanabe	4	1
3	(United States) **P Fendick**	**6**	**6**
5	(United States) **A Grossman**	**6**	**7**
Q	(Canada) C Delisle	3	6
(Canada) **H Kelesi**	**6**	3	**6**
(United States) A Keller	4	**6**	3
(Venezuela) M Mazzotta	3	3
(United States) **M McGrath**	**6**	**6**
WC	(Chinese Taipei) J Lee	3	4
2	(South Africa) **A Coetzer**	**6**	**6**

Second round
1	(United States) **Z Garrison-Jackson**	**6**	**6**
(United States) T Austin	1	3
(United States) **K Adams**	**6**	3	**6**
8	(United States) L Harvey-Wild	1	**6**	1
4	(United States) L McNeil	4	2
(United States) **S Cacic**	**6**	**6**
WC	(United States) J Steven	4	2
6	(Netherlands) **B Schultz**	**6**	**6**
7	(United States) **A Frazier**	**6**	**6**
(Mexico) A Gavaldón	1	3
(Slovakia) R Zrubáková	2	3
3	(United States) **P Fendick**	**6**	**6**
5	(United States) A Grossman	3	4
(Canada) **H Kelesi**	**6**	**6**
(United States) **M McGrath**	**7**	2	**6**
2	(South Africa) A Coetzer	6	**6**	3

Quarterfinals
1	(United States) **Z Garrison-Jackson**	**7**	1	**7**
(United States) K Adams	6	**6**	6
(United States) S Cacic	6	3
6	(Netherlands) **B Schultz**	**7**	**6**
7	(United States) **A Frazier**	**6**	**6**
3	(United States) P Fendick	4	1
(Canada) H Kelesi	**6**	3	4
(United States) **M McGrath**	2	**6**	**6**

Semifinals
1	(United States) Z Garrison-Jackson	**7**	3	4
6	(Netherlands) **B Schultz**	6	**6**	**6**
7	(United States) A Frazier	3	2
(United States) **M McGrath**	**6**	**6**

Final
6	(Netherlands) Brenda Schultz	6	6
(United States) **Meredith McGrath**	**7**	**7**
