= 2006 Regions Morgan Keegan Championships and the Cellular South Cup =

2006 Regions Morgan Keegan Championships and Cellular South Cup
- Date: February 20– 26
- Edition: 31st (men) / 21st (women)
- Surface: Hard / indoor
- Location: Memphis, Tennessee, US
- Venue: Racquet Club of Memphis

Champions

Men's singles
- (Germany) Tommy Haas

Women's singles
- (Sweden) Sofia Arvidsson

Men's doubles
- (Croatia) Ivo Karlović / (South Africa) Chris Haggard

Women's doubles
- (United States) Lisa Raymond / (Australia) Samantha Stosur
← 2005 ·	Regions Morgan Keegan Championships	· 2007 →
← 2005 ·	Cellular South Cup	· 2007 →

The 2006 Regions Morgan Keegan Championships and the Cellular South Cup were tennis tournaments played on indoor hard courts. It was the 31st edition of the Regions Morgan Keegan Championships, the 21st edition of the Cellular South Cup, and was part of the International Series Gold of the 2006 ATP Tour, and of the Tier III Series of the 2006 WTA Tour. Both the men's and the women's events took place at the Racquet Club of Memphis in Memphis, Tennessee, United States, from February 20 through February 26, 2006.

== Finals ==
=== Men's singles ===
(Germany) Tommy Haas defeated (Sweden) Robin Söderling, 6–3, 6–2

=== Women's singles ===
(Sweden) Sofia Arvidsson defeated (Poland) Marta Domachowska, 6–2, 2–6, 6–3

=== Men's doubles ===
(South Africa) Chris Haggard / (Croatia) Ivo Karlović defeated (United States) James Blake / (United States) Mardy Fish, 0–6, 7–5, [10–5]

=== Women's doubles ===
(United States) Lisa Raymond / (Australia) Samantha Stosur defeated (Belarus) Victoria Azarenka / (Denmark) Caroline Wozniacki 7–6^{(7–2)}, 6–3
