= 2003 Kroger St. Jude International – Women's doubles =

Women's doubles
- 2003 Kroger St. Jude International

Final
- Champions: (Japan) Akiko Morigami (Japan) Saori Obata
- Runners-up: (Russia) Alina Jidkova (Australia) Bryanne Stewart
- Score: 6–1, 6–1

Details
- Draw: 16
- Seeds: 4

Events
Singles	men	women
Doubles	men	women
← 2002 ·	U.S. National Indoor Championships	· 2004 →

Ai Sugiyama and Elena Tatarkova were the defending champions, but did not compete this year.

Qualifiers Akiko Morigami and Saori Obata won the title by defeating Alina Jidkova and Bryanne Stewart 6–1, 6–1 in the final.

== Seeds ==
1. (Japan) Shinobu Asagoe / (Japan) Nana Miyagi (first round)
2. (South Africa) Amanda Coetzer / (South Africa) Jessica Steck (semifinals)
3. (Italy) Silvia Farina Elia / (United States) Jennifer Hopkins (first round)
4. (Germany) Kirstin Freye / (Germany) Angelika Rösch (first round)

== Draw ==
=== Key ===
- Q = Qualifier
- WC = Wild card
- LL = Lucky loser
- Alt = Alternate
- SE = Special exempt
- PR = Protected ranking
- ITF = ITF entry
- JE = Junior exempt
- w/o = Walkover
- r = Retired
- d = Defaulted
- SR = Special ranking

=== Draw ===
First round
1	(Japan) S Asagoe (Japan) N Miyagi	6	2	3
(Canada) M-È Pelletier (United States) M Washington	4	6	6
WC	(United States) B Bielik (Russia) V Zvonareva	6	5	2
(Russia) A Jidkova (Australia) B Stewart	3	7	6
4	(Germany) K Freye (Germany) A Rösch	5	2
(United States) L Granville (United States) S Taylor	7	6
(United States) M Irvin (United States) A Stevenson	3	4
(Germany) B Lamade (Germany) C Schneider	6	6
(South Korea) Y-j Cho (France) S Foretz	7	2	6
(Australia) S Stone (Australia) S Stosur	5	6	2
Q	(Japan) A Morigami (Japan) S Obata	7^{7}	6
3	(Italy) S Farina Elia (United States) J Hopkins	6^{3}	2
(United States) A Augustus (Canada) V Webb	7^{7}	6
(United States) T Cochran (United States) B Mattek	6^{4}	4
(United States) E Schmidt (Italy) An Serra Zanetti	6	5	0
2	(South Africa) A Coetzer (South Africa) J Steck	2	7	6

Quarterfinals
(Canada) M-È Pelletier (United States) M Washington	1	5
(Russia) A Jidkova (Australia) B Stewart	6	7
(United States) L Granville (United States) S Taylor
(Germany) B Lamade (Germany) C Schneider	w/o
(South Korea) Y-j Cho (France) S Foretz	2	6^{3}
Q	(Japan) A Morigami (Japan) S Obata	6	7^{7}
(United States) A Augustus (Canada) V Webb	1	3
2	(South Africa) A Coetzer (South Africa) J Steck	6	6

Semifinals
(Russia) A Jidkova (Australia) B Stewart	6^{3}	6	6
(Germany) B Lamade (Germany) C Schneider	7^{7}	4	0
Q	(Japan) A Morigami (Japan) S Obata	6	6
2	(South Africa) A Coetzer (South Africa) J Steck	3	4

Final
(Russia) A Jidkova (Australia) B Stewart	1	1
Q	(Japan) A Morigami (Japan) S Obata	6	6
