= Emily Bond =

British professional tennis player

- Country (sports): (United Kingdom) Great Britain
- Born: 13 October 1973 (age 51)
- Plays: Right-handed
- Prize money: $39,815

Singles
- Highest ranking: No. 297 (31 March 1997)

Doubles
- Highest ranking: No. 271 (27 March 1995)

Grand Slam doubles results
- Wimbledon: 1R (1993, 1995)

Emily Bond (born 13 October 1973) is a British former professional tennis player.

== Biography ==
A right-handed player from Gloucestershire, Bond played on the professional tour in the 1990s.

Bond won her first ITF singles title at Swindon in 1993, beating Russian Fed Cup representative Svetlana Parkhomenko in the final. In 1994 she qualified for the main draw of a WTA Tour tournament in Moscow, where she was beaten in three sets by Ruxandra Dragomir in the opening round. She had a win over future top 50 player Sonya Jeyaseelan in the 1996 Wimbledon qualifiers and the following year reached her best singles ranking of 297 in the world.

As a doubles player, Bond twice featured in the main draw at Wimbledon. She qualified for the women's doubles as a lucky loser partnering Claire Taylor in 1993, then received a wildcard to compete with Joanne Moore in 1995.

== Personal life ==
Bond married the billionaire Georg von Opel, and has four children with him. She also founded a farm & dining shop, Malverleys Farm & Dining, in Newbury.

== ITF Circuit finals ==
$25,000 tournaments
$10,000 tournaments

=== Singles (2–1) ===
Outcome	No.	Date	Location	Surface	Opponent	Score
Runner-up	1.	4 October 1993	Basingstoke, United Kingdom	Hard	(Russia) Svetlana Parkhomenko	6–2, 3–6, 0–6
Winner	1.	8 November 1993	Swindon, United Kingdom	Carpet	(Russia) Svetlana Parkhomenko	7–5, 6–3
Winner	2.	27 May 1996	Istanbul, Turkey	Hard	(Germany) Petra Winzenhöller	1–6, 6–3, 6–1

=== Doubles (1–6) ===
Outcome	No.	Date	Tournament	Surface	Partner	Opponents	Score
Runner-up	1.	26 April 1993	Lerida, Spain	Clay	(France) Caroline Toyre	(Bulgaria) Svetlana Krivencheva (Greece) Christina Zachariadou	1–6, 4–6
Runner-up	2.	27 June 1994	Washington, United States	Hard	(United States) Lindsay Lee-Waters	(United States) Annie Miller (Canada) Stephanie Tibbits	5–7, 4–6
Runner-up	3.	11 September 1994	Jersey, United Kingdom	Hard	(United Kingdom) Caroline Hunt	(United Kingdom) Kaye Hand (United Kingdom) Sara Tse	6–0, 1–6, 4–6
Runner-up	4.	9 October 1994	Nottingham, United Kingdom	Carpet	(United Kingdom) Ekaterina Roubanova	(Germany) Tanja Karsten (Germany) Michaela Seibold	4–6, 6–3, 6–7
Runner-up	5.	27 February 1995	Miami, United States	Hard	(United States) Lindsay Lee-Waters	(United States) Elly Hakami (United States) Stephanie Reece	1–6, 1–6
Winner	1.	1 June 1996	Istanbul, Turkey	Hard	(Italy) Emanuela Brusati	(United Kingdom) Helen Crook (United Kingdom) Victoria Davies	7–6^{(4)}, 6–4
Runner-up	6.	6 October 1996	Nottingham, United Kingdom	Carpet	(United Kingdom) Ekaterina Roubanova	(United Kingdom) Julie Pullin (United Kingdom) Lorna Woodroffe	2–6, 4–6
