= 2006 Cellular South Cup – Doubles =

Doubles
- 2006 Regions Morgan Keegan Championships and the Cellular South Cup

Final
- Champions: (United States) Lisa Raymond (Australia) Samantha Stosur
- Runners-up: (Belarus) Victoria Azarenka (Denmark) Caroline Wozniacki
- Score: 7–6^{(7–2)}, 6–3

Details
- Draw: 16
- Seeds: 4

Events
Singles	men	women
Doubles	men	women
← 2005 ·	Regions Morgan Keegan Championships	· 2007 →
← 2005 ·	Cellular South Cup	· 2007 →

Miho Saeki and Yuka Yoshida were the defending champions, but did not compete this year.

Lisa Raymond and Samantha Stosur won the title by defeating Victoria Azarenka and Caroline Wozniacki 7–6^{(7–2)}, 6–3 in the final.

== Seeds ==
1. (United States) Lisa Raymond / (Australia) Samantha Stosur (champions)
2. (Germany) Anna-Lena Grönefeld / (United States) Meghann Shaughnessy (quarterfinals, withdrew due to a left ankle sprain on Grönefeld)
3. (United Kingdom) Claire Curran / (United States) Laura Granville (first round)
4. (United States) Carly Gullickson / (United States) Ashley Harkleroad (semifinals)

== Draw ==
=== Key ===
- Q = Qualifier
- WC = Wild card
- LL = Lucky loser
- Alt = Alternate
- SE = Special exempt
- PR = Protected ranking
- ITF = ITF entry
- JE = Junior exempt
- w/o = Walkover
- r = Retired
- d = Defaulted
- SR = Special ranking

=== Draw ===
First round
1	(United States) L Raymond (Australia) S Stosur	6	7
(United States) CA Avants (United States) S Fonseca	1	5
(Canada) S Dubois (Romania) A Perianu	6	5	4
Q	(Uzbekistan) V Lepchenko (Russia) T Panova	2	7	6
3	(United Kingdom) C Curran (United States) L Granville	4	6	3
LL	(Ukraine) T Luzhanska (Russia) Y Shvedova	6	1	6
(Russia) E Bychkova (Lithuania) L Stančiūtė	7^{8}	6
(Puerto Rico) V Castellvi (Australia) C Wheeler	6^{6}	4
(Canada) M Drake (Czech Republic) V Uhlířová	4	1
(United States) A Frazier (United States) M Tu	6	6
(Bulgaria) S Krivencheva (Finland) E Laine	5	3
4	(United States) C Gullickson (United States) A Harkleroad	7	6
(Germany) S Klösel (Ukraine) T Perebiynis	4	3
WC	(Belarus) V Azarenka (Denmark) C Wozniacki	6	6
(United States) T Dabek (China) M Yuan	1	2
2	(Germany) AL Grönefeld (United States) M Shaughnessy	6	6

Quarterfinals
1	(United States) L Raymond (Australia) S Stosur	6	6
Q	(Uzbekistan) V Lepchenko (Russia) T Panova	2	4
LL	(Ukraine) T Luzhanska (Russia) Y Shvedova	6	7^{7}
(Russia) E Bychkova (Lithuania) L Stančiūtė	4	6^{1}
(United States) A Frazier (United States) M Tu	4	4
4	(United States) C Gullickson (United States) A Harkleroad	6	6
WC	(Belarus) V Azarenka (Denmark) C Wozniacki	w/o
2	(Germany) AL Grönefeld (United States) M Shaughnessy

Semifinals
1	(United States) L Raymond (Australia) S Stosur	6	6
LL	(Ukraine) T Luzhanska (Russia) Y Shvedova	4	0
4	(United States) C Gullickson (United States) A Harkleroad	6	4	5
WC	(Belarus) V Azarenka (Denmark) C Wozniacki	3	6	7

Final
1	(United States) L Raymond (Australia) S Stosur	7^{7}	6
WC	(Belarus) V Azarenka (Denmark) C Wozniacki	6^{2}	3

== Qualifying draw ==
=== Seeds ===
1. (Ukraine) Tetiana Luzhanska / (Russia) Yaroslava Shvedova (qualifying competition, lucky losers)
2. (Uzbekistan) Varvara Lepchenko / (Russia) Tatiana Panova (qualified)

=== Qualifiers ===
1. (Uzbekistan) Varvara Lepchenko / (Russia) Tatiana Panova

=== Lucky losers ===
1. (Ukraine) Tetiana Luzhanska / (Russia) Yaroslava Shvedova

=== Draw ===
Qualifying competition
1	(Ukraine) Tetiana Luzhanska (Russia) Yaroslava Shvedova	4
2	(Uzbekistan) Varvara Lepchenko (Russia) Tatiana Panova	8
