= Stephanie Tibbits =

Canadian tennis player

- Country (sports): Canada
- Born: 26 February 1975 (age 50)
- Prize money: $15,211

Singles
- Career record: 45–66
- Highest ranking: No. 368 (15 Nov 1993)

Doubles
- Career record: 10–24
- Career titles: 1 ITF
- Highest ranking: No. 427 (18 Oct 1993)

Stephanie Tibbits (born 26 February 1975) is a Canadian former professional tennis player.

Tibbits represented Canada at the 1991 Pan American Games in Havana. Tibbits was a two-time Canadian U18 National Champion in 1992 and 1993. On the professional tour, she reached a career high singles ranking of 368 in the world and made WTA Tour main draw appearance as a qualifier at the 1993 Challenge Bell in Quebec City, where she fell in the first round to the top seed Helena Suková. From 1996 to 1999 she played collegiate tennis for the California Golden Bears of UC Berkeley.

== ITF finals ==
=== Doubles: 1 (1–0) ===
Outcome	No.	Date	Tournament	Surface	Partner	Opponents	Score
Winner	1.	3 July 1994	Columbia, United States	Hard	(United States) Annie Miller	(United Kingdom) Emily Bond (United States) Lindsay Lee-Waters	7–5, 6–4
