= 1997 IGA Tennis Classic =

- Date: February 17–23
- Edition: 12th
- Category: Tier III
- Draw: 30S / 16D
- Prize money: $164,250
- Surface: Hard / indoor
- Location: Oklahoma City, OK, U.S.
- Venue: The Greens Country Club

Champions

Singles
- (United States) Lindsay Davenport

Doubles
- (Japan) Rika Hiraki / (Japan) Nana Miyagi
← 1996 ·	IGA Tennis Classic	· 1998 →

The 1997 IGA Tennis Classic was a women's tennis tournament played on indoor hard courts at The Greens Country Club in Oklahoma City, Oklahoma in the United States that was part of Tier III of the 1997 WTA Tour. It was the twelfth edition of the tournament and was held from February 17 through February 23, 1997. First-seeded Lindsay Davenport won the singles title.

== Finals ==
=== Singles ===
(United States) Lindsay Davenport defeated (United States) Lisa Raymond 6–4, 6–2

- It was Davenport's 1st singles title of the year and the 8th of her career.

=== Doubles ===
(Japan) Rika Hiraki / (Japan) Nana Miyagi defeated (United States) Marianne Werdel-Witmeyer / (United States) Tami Whitlinger-Jones 6–4, 6–1

- It was Hiraki's 1st doubles title of the year and the 4th of her career. It was Miyagi's 3rd and last doubles title of the year and the 15th of her career.

== Prize money ==
Event	W	F	SF	QF	Round of 16	Round of 32
Singles	$27,000	$13,500	$6,800	$3,800	$1,850	$1,120
