= 1996 IGA Tennis Classic =

- Date: February 20–25
- Edition: 11th
- Category: Tier III
- Draw: 32S / 16D
- Prize money: $164,250
- Surface: Hard / indoor
- Location: Oklahoma City, OK, U.S.
- Venue: The Greens Country Club

Champions

Singles
- (Netherlands) Brenda Schultz-McCarthy

Doubles
- (United States) Chanda Rubin / (Netherlands) Brenda Schultz-McCarthy
← 1995 ·	U.S. National Indoor Championships	· 1997 →

The 1996 IGA Tennis Classic was a women's tennis tournament played on indoor hard courts at The Greens Country Club in Oklahoma City, Oklahoma in the United States. It was part of the Tier III category of the 1996 WTA Tour. It was the 11th edition of the tournament and was held from February 20 through February 25, 1996. Second-seeded Brenda Schultz-McCarthy won her second consecutive singles title at the event.

== Finals ==
=== Singles ===
(Netherlands) Brenda Schultz-McCarthy defeated (South Africa) Amanda Coetzer 6–3, 6–2

- It was Schultz-McCarthy's only singles title of the year and the 6th of her career.

=== Doubles ===
(United States) Chanda Rubin / (Netherlands) Brenda Schultz-McCarthy defeated (United States) Katrina Adams / (United States) Debbie Graham 6–4, 6–3

- It was Rubin's 2nd doubles title of the year and the 5th of her career. It was Schultz-McCarthy's 1st doubles title of the year and the 5th of her career.
