= Zach Dailey =

American tennis player

- Country (sports): United States
- Born: November 14, 1981 (age 43)
- Height: 5 ft 10 in (178 cm)
- Plays: Right-handed
- Prize money: $12,477

Singles
- Career record: 0–1
- Highest ranking: No. 682 (Oct 17, 2005)

Doubles
- Highest ranking: No. 1068 (Sep 18, 2006)

Zach Dailey (born November 14, 1981) is an American former professional tennis player.

Dailey, a native of Memphis, played collegiate tennis for Vanderbilt University and was a member of the Commodores side which finished runner-up in the 2003 NCAA Division I Championships. He was co-champion, with teammate Chad Harris, of the 2004 SEC Indoor Championships.

Graduating from Vanderbilt University in 2004, Dailey spent two years competing on the professional tour and reached a best singles world ranking of 682. He made his only ATP Tour main draw appearance at his home tournament, the 2005 Regions Morgan Keegan Championships in Memphis, where he lost in the first round to Robby Ginepri.

== ITF Futures titles ==
=== Doubles: (1) ===
No.	Date	Tournament	Surface	Partner	Opponents	Score
1.	Oct 2005	Mexico F14, Monterrey	Hard	(United States) Troy Hahn	(Japan) Yaoki Ishii (Japan) Joji Miyao	6–4, 5–7, 7–6^{(4)}
