= 1994 IGA Tennis Classic =

- Date: February 14– 20
- Edition: 9th
- Category: Tier III
- Draw: 32S / 16D
- Prize money: $150,000
- Surface: Hard / indoor
- Location: Oklahoma City, OK, U.S.
- Venue: The Greens Country Club

Champions

Singles
- (United States) Meredith McGrath

Doubles
- (United States) Patty Fendick / (United States) Meredith McGrath
← 1993 ·	IGA Tennis Classic	· 1995 →

The 1994 IGA Tennis Classic was a women's tennis tournament played on indoor hard courts at The Greens Country Club in Oklahoma City, Oklahoma in the United States that was part of Tier III of the 1994 WTA Tour. It was the 9th edition of the tournament was held from February 14 through February 20, 1994. Unseeded Meredith McGrath won the singles title and earned $27,000 first-prize money.

== Finals ==
=== Singles ===
(United States) Meredith McGrath defeated (Netherlands) Brenda Schultz 7–6^{(8–6)}, 7–6^{(7–4)}

- It was McGrath's first singles title of her career.

=== Doubles ===
(United States) Patty Fendick / (United States) Meredith McGrath defeated (United States) Katrina Adams / (Netherlands) Manon Bollegraf 7–6^{(7–3)}, 6–2

- It was Fendick's 2nd title of the year and the 25th of her career. It was McGrath's 3rd title of the year and the 12th of her career.
