= 2003 Kroger St. Jude International – Men's doubles =

Men's doubles
- 2003 Kroger St. Jude International

Final
- Champions: (The Bahamas) Mark Knowles (Canada) Daniel Nestor
- Runners-up: (United States) Bob Bryan (United States) Mike Bryan
- Score: 6–2, 7–6^{(7–3)}

Details
- Draw: 16
- Seeds: 4

Events
Singles	men	women
Doubles	men	women
- U.S. National Indoor Championships

Brian MacPhie and Nenad Zimonjić were the defending champions but only MacPhie competed that year with Chris Haggard.

Haggard and MacPhie lost in the quarterfinals to Davide Sanguinetti and Sargis Sargsian.

Mark Knowles and Daniel Nestor won in the final 6–2, 7–6^{(7–3)} against Bob Bryan and Mike Bryan.

== Seeds ==
1. (The Bahamas) Mark Knowles / (Canada) Daniel Nestor (champions)
2. (United States) Bob Bryan / (United States) Mike Bryan (final)
3. (India) Mahesh Bhupathi / (Australia) Joshua Eagle (quarterfinals)
4. (South Africa) Chris Haggard / (United States) Brian MacPhie (quarterfinals)

== Draw ==
Key

- Q = Qualifier
- WC = Wild card
- LL = Lucky loser
- Alt = Alternate
- ITF = ITF entry
- PR = Protected ranking
- SR = Special ranking
- SE = Special exempt
- JE = Junior exempt
- JR = Junior Accelerator Programme entrant
- CO = College Accelerator Programme entrant
- NG = Next Gen Accelerator Program entrant
- w/o = Walkover
- r = Retired
- d = Defaulted

First round
1	(The Bahamas) M Knowles (Canada) D Nestor	6	6
ALT	(Spain) J Balcells (United States) E Taino	3	4
(The Bahamas) M Merklein (Japan) T Shimada	5	6^{5}
(South Africa) D Adams (South Africa) R Koenig	7	7^{7}
3	(India) M Bhupathi (Australia) J Eagle	6	6
(South Africa) J-L de Jager (South Korea) H-T Lee	4	3
WC	(United States) J Blake (United States) J Gimelstob	6	4	6
(South Africa) E Ferreira (South Africa) M Wakefield	4	6	3
(Italy) D Sanguinetti (Armenia) S Sargsian	6	1
(United States) J Thomas (Belarus) V Voltchkov	4	1^{r}
(United States) A Roddick (Thailand) P Srichaphan	3	7^{7}	3
4	(South Africa) C Haggard (United States) B MacPhie	6	6^{4}	6
WC	(United States) M Fish (United States) J Morrison	5	6	6
(United States) J-M Gambill (United States) G Oliver	7	3	2
(United States) T Dent (United States) R Ginepri	7^{7}	6^{5}	2
2	(United States) B Bryan (United States) M Bryan	6^{4}	7^{7}	6

Quarterfinals
1	(The Bahamas) M Knowles (Canada) D Nestor	6	6
(South Africa) D Adams (South Africa) R Koenig	3	4
3	(India) M Bhupathi (Australia) J Eagle	6^{2}	2
WC	(United States) J Blake (United States) J Gimelstob	7^{7}	6
(Italy) D Sanguinetti (Armenia) S Sargsian	7	7^{7}
4	(South Africa) C Haggard (United States) B MacPhie	5	6^{4}
WC	(United States) M Fish (United States) J Morrison	5	4^{r}
2	(United States) B Bryan (United States) M Bryan	7	4

Semifinals
1	(The Bahamas) M Knowles (Canada) D Nestor	6	7^{7}
WC	(United States) J Blake (United States) J Gimelstob	4	6^{3}
(Italy) D Sanguinetti (Armenia) S Sargsian	3	4
2	(United States) B Bryan (United States) M Bryan	6	6

Final
1	(The Bahamas) M Knowles (Canada) D Nestor	6	7^{7}
2	(United States) B Bryan (United States) M Bryan	2	6^{3}
