= 2006 Regions Morgan Keegan Championships – Doubles =

Doubles
- 2006 Regions Morgan Keegan Championships and the Cellular South Cup

Final
- Champion: (South Africa) Chris Haggard (Croatia) Ivo Karlović
- Runner-up: (United States) James Blake (United States) Mardy Fish
- Score: 0–6, 7–5, [10–5]

Events
Singles	men	women
Doubles	men	women
← 2005 ·	Regions Morgan Keegan Championships	· 2007 →
← 2005 ·	Cellular South Cup	· 2007 →

Simon Aspelin and Todd Perry were the defending champions, but lost in the semifinals this year.

Chris Haggard and Ivo Karlović won in the final 0–6, 7–5, [10–5], against James Blake and Mardy Fish.

== Seeds ==
1. (United States) Bob Bryan / (United States) Mike Bryan (semifinals, withdrew)
2. (Sweden) Simon Aspelin / (Australia) Todd Perry (semifinals)
3. (United States) Justin Gimelstob / (Australia) Stephen Huss (quarterfinals)
4. (Australia) Jordan Kerr / (United States) Travis Parrott (first round)

== Draw ==
=== Key ===
- Q = Qualifier
- WC = Wild card
- LL = Lucky loser
- Alt = Alternate
- SE = Special exempt
- PR = Protected ranking
- ITF = ITF entry
- JE = Junior exempt
- w/o = Walkover
- r = Retired
- d = Defaulted
- SR = Special ranking

=== Draw ===
First round
1	(United States) B Bryan (United States) M Bryan	6	6
(Czech Republic) J Levinský (Sweden) R Lindstedt	3	2
(Belgium) X Malisse (Belgium) K Vliegen	6	6
(United States) P Goldstein (United States) J Thomas	4	3
3	(United States) J Gimelstob (Australia) S Huss	6	6
(Germany) B Phau (Chinese Taipei) Y-t Wang	1	4
(Australia) A Fisher (United States) T Phillips	2	6	[7]
WC	(United States) J Blake (United States) M Fish	6	4	[10]
(South Africa) C Haggard (Croatia) I Karlović	6^{7}	6	[10]
(Israel) H Levy (Czech Republic) T Zíb	7^{9}	4	[7]
(United States) G Dragicevic (Russia) D Tursunov	2	7^{7}	[10]
4	(Australia) J Kerr (United States) T Parrott	6	6^{2}	[3]
WC	(United States) A Delic (United States) B Reynolds	6	6
(United States) R Ginepri (Spain) T Robredo	4	3
(South Africa) J Coetzee (Netherlands) R Wassen	3	2
2	(Sweden) S Aspelin (Australia) T Perry	6	6

Quarterfinals
1	(United States) B Bryan (United States) M Bryan	6	7^{7}
(Belgium) X Malisse (Belgium) K Vliegen	1	6^{4}
3	(United States) J Gimelstob (Australia) S Huss	6^{5}	7	[9]
WC	(United States) J Blake (United States) M Fish	7^{7}	5	[11]
(South Africa) C Haggard (Croatia) I Karlović	7	7
(United States) G Dragicevic (Russia) D Tursunov	5	5
WC	(United States) A Delic (United States) B Reynolds	2	2
2	(Sweden) S Aspelin (Australia) T Perry	6	6

Semifinals
1	(United States) B Bryan (United States) M Bryan
WC	(United States) J Blake (United States) M Fish	w/o
(South Africa) C Haggard (Croatia) I Karlović	4	6	[12]
2	(Sweden) S Aspelin (Australia) T Perry	6	3	[10]

Final
WC	(United States) J Blake (United States) M Fish	6	5	[5]
(South Africa) C Haggard (Croatia) I Karlović	0	7	[10]
