= 1995 IGA Tennis Classic =

- Date: February 13–19
- Edition: 10th
- Category: Tier III
- Draw: 32S / 16D
- Prize money: $161,250
- Surface: Hard / indoor
- Location: Oklahoma City, Oklahoma, U.S.
- Venue: The Greens Country Club

Champions

Singles
- (Netherlands) Brenda Schultz

Doubles
- (United States) Nicole Arendt / (Italy) Laura Golarsa
← 1994 ·	IGA Tennis Classic	· 1996 →

The 1995 IGA Tennis Classic was a women's tennis tournament played on indoor hard courts at The Greens Country Club in Oklahoma City, Oklahoma in the United States that was part of Tier III of the 1995 WTA Tour. It was the tenth edition of the tournament and was held from February 13 through February 19, 1995. First-seeded Brenda Schultz won the singles title and earned $26,500 first-prize money.

== Finals ==
=== Singles ===
(Netherlands) Brenda Schultz defeated (Russia) Elena Likhovtseva 6–1, 6–2

- It was Schultz's 2nd title of the year and the 7th of her career.

=== Doubles ===
(United States) Nicole Arendt / (Italy) Laura Golarsa defeated (United States) Katrina Adams / (Netherlands) Brenda Schultz 6–4, 6–3

- It was Arendt's 1st title of the year and the 3rd of her career. It was Golarsa's only title of the year and the 5th of her career.
