= 1995 IGA Tennis Classic – Singles =

Singles
- 1995 IGA Classic
- 1994 Champion: (United States) Meredith McGrath

Final
- Champion: (Netherlands) Brenda Schultz
- Runner-up: (Russia) Elena Likhovtseva
- Score: 6–1, 6–2

Details
- Draw: 32
- Seeds: 8

Events
| Singles | Doubles |
- IGA Classic

Meredith McGrath was the defending champion but did not compete that year.

Brenda Schultz won in the final 6–1, 6–2 against Elena Likhovtseva.

== Seeds ==
A champion seed is indicated in bold text while text in italics indicates the round in which that seed was eliminated.

1. (Netherlands) **Brenda Schultz (champion)**
2. (United States) Amy Frazier (semifinals)
3. n/a
4. (South Africa) Amanda Coetzer (first round)
5. (United States) Lisa Raymond (quarterfinals)
6. (Australia) Nicole Bradtke (second round)
7. (United States) Tami Whitlinger-Jones (quarterfinals)
8. (United States) Patty Fendick (semifinals)
9. (Russia) Elena Likhovtseva (final)

== Draw ==
Key

- Q = Qualifier
- WC = Wild card
- LL = Lucky loser
- Alt = Alternate
- ITF = ITF entry
- PR = Protected ranking
- SR = Special ranking
- SE = Special exempt
- JE = Junior exempt
- JR = Junior Accelerator Programme entrant
- CO = College Accelerator Programme entrant
- NG = Next Gen Accelerator Program entrant
- w/o = Walkover
- r = Retired
- d = Defaulted

First round
1 | (Netherlands) **B Schultz** | **6** | **6**
(Austria) B Reinstadler | 3 | 4
(United States) **N Arendt** | 4 | **6** | **6**
WC | (United States) J Steven | **6** | 0 | 3
WC | (United States) **A Keller** | **6** | **7**
(Germany) M Zivec-Skulj | 2 | 5
(Russia) T Panova | 2 | **6** | 2
6 | (Australia) **N Bradtke** | **6** | 0 | **6**
4 | (South Africa) A Coetzer | 3 | **6** | 6
(United States) **K Adams** | **6** | 3 | **7**
WC | (Canada) P Hy-Boulais | 4 | 0
Q | (United States) **L Poruri** | **6** | **6**
(South Africa) **E Reinach** | **6** | **6**
LL | (Romania) C Cristea | 2 | 1
(Japan) M Miyauchi | 2 | 3
8 | (United States) **P Fendick** | **6** | **6**
9 | (Russia) **E Likhovtseva** | **6** | **6**
Q | (United States) L Lee | 1 | 4
Q | (United States) **K Miller** | 3 | **6** | **6**
(United States) E Hakami | **6** | 3 | 0
(Belgium) **D Monami** | **6** | **6**
(Italy) L Golarsa | 4 | 4
LL | (Canada) S Jeyaseelan | 4 | 6
5 | (United States) **L Raymond** | **6** | **7**
7 | (United States) **T Whitlinger-Jones** | 6 | **6** | **6**
(Belgium) L Courtois | **7** | 0 | 1
(Hungary) **A Temesvári** | **7** | **6**
(United States) J Watanabe | 5 | 1
(Netherlands) **Y Basting** | **6** | **6**
(Australia) K Radford | 4 | 2
Q | (United States) E deLone | 2 | 3
2 | (United States) **A Frazier** | **6** | **6**

Second round
1 | (Netherlands) **B Schultz** | **6** | **7**
(United States) N Arendt | 4 | 6
WC | (United States) **A Keller** | 3 | **7** | **7**
6 | (Australia) N Bradtke | **6** | 5 | 6
(United States) K Adams | **6** | 6 | 1
Q | (United States) **L Poruri** | 4 | **7** | **6**
(South Africa) E Reinach | 2 | 1
8 | (United States) **P Fendick** | **6** | **6**
9 | (Russia) **E Likhovtseva** | **6** | **6**
Q | (United States) K Miller | 0 | 0
(Belgium) D Monami | 5 | **6** | 2
5 | (United States) **L Raymond** | **7** | 4 | **6**
7 | (United States) **T Whitlinger-Jones** | **6** | **6**
(Hungary) A Temesvári | 2 | 2
(Netherlands) Y Basting | **6** | 6 | 2
2 | (United States) **A Frazier** | 4 | **7** | **6**

Quarterfinals
1 | (Netherlands) **B Schultz** | **6** | 3 | **6**
WC | (United States) A Keller | 3 | **6** | 0
Q | (United States) L Poruri | 3 | 2
8 | (United States) **P Fendick** | **6** | **6**
9 | (Russia) **E Likhovtseva** | **6** | **6**
5 | (United States) L Raymond | 1 | 3
7 | (United States) T Whitlinger-Jones | 4 | 3
2 | (United States) **A Frazier** | **6** | **6**

Semifinals
1 | (Netherlands) **B Schultz** | **6** | **6**
8 | (United States) P Fendick | 2 | 2
9 | (Russia) **E Likhovtseva** | **7** | 2 | **7**
2 | (United States) A Frazier | 5 | **6** | 5

Final
1 | (Netherlands) **Brenda Schultz** | **6** | **6**
9 | (Russia) Elena Likhovtseva | 1 | 2
