= 1994 IGA Tennis Classic – Doubles =

Doubles
- 1994 IGA Classic
- 1993 Champions: (United States) Patty Fendick (United States) Zina Garrison-Jackson

Final
- Champions: (United States) Patty Fendick (United States) Meredith McGrath
- Runners-up: (United States) Katrina Adams (Netherlands) Manon Bollegraf
- Score: 7–6, 6–2

Details
- Draw: 16
- Seeds: 4

Events
Singles	Doubles
- IGA Classic

Patty Fendick and Zina Garrison-Jackson were the defending champions but they competed with different partners that year, Fendick with Meredith McGrath and Garrison-Jackson with Lori McNeil.

Garrison-Jackson and McNeil lost in the semifinals to Katrina Adams and Manon Bollegraf.

Fendick and Garrison-Jackson won in the final 7–6, 6–2 against Adams and Bollegraf.

== Seeds ==
Champion seeds are indicated in bold text while text in italics indicates the round in which those seeds were eliminated.

1. (United States) **Patty Fendick** / (United States) **Meredith McGrath (champions)**
2. (United States) Zina Garrison-Jackson / (United States) Lori McNeil (semifinals)
3. (United States) Katrina Adams / (Netherlands) Manon Bollegraf (final)
4. (United States) Ann Grossman / (New Zealand) Julie Richardson (first round)

== Draw ==
Key

- Q = Qualifier
- WC = Wild card
- LL = Lucky loser
- Alt = Alternate
- ITF = ITF entry
- PR = Protected ranking
- SR = Special ranking
- SE = Special exempt
- JE = Junior exempt
- JR = Junior Accelerator Programme entrant
- CO = College Accelerator Programme entrant
- NG = Next Gen Accelerator Program entrant
- w/o = Walkover
- r = Retired
- d = Defaulted

First round
1	(United States) **P Fendick** (United States) **M McGrath**	**6**	**6**
(United States) M L Daniels (Canada) R Simpson-Alter	2	0
(Romania) **C Cristea** (United States) **S Reece**	2	**6**	**6**
(Ukraine) E Brioukhovets (Croatia) M Murić	**6**	0	1
4	(United States) A Grossman (New Zealand) J Richardson	6	6
(Canada) **M Bernard** (Canada) **C Delisle**	**7**	**7**
(United States) **C Benjamin** (United States) **M Jackson-Nobrega**	**6**	4	**7**
(Netherlands) I Driehuis (Mexico) L Novelo	1	**6**	6
(Australia) **T Morton-Rodgers** (United States) **V Paynter**	**6**	**6**
WC	(United States) J Hall (United States) M Norwood	0	1
(United States) A Keller (United States) S McCarthy	2	1
3	(United States) **K Adams** (Netherlands) **M Bollegraf**	**6**	**6**
(South Africa) A Coetzer (United States) J Steven	5	1
Q	(United States) **S Cacic** (Canada) **H Kelesi**	**7**	**6**
(United States) L Harvey-Wild (United States) B Nagelsen	4	2
2	(United States) **Z Garrison-Jackson** (United States) **L McNeil**	**6**	**6**

Quarterfinals
1	(United States) **P Fendick** (United States) **M McGrath**	**6**	**6**
(Romania) C Cristea (United States) S Reece	2	1
(Canada) M Bernard (Canada) C Delisle	**6**	5	2
(United States) **C Benjamin** (United States) **M Jackson-Nobrega**	3	**7**	**6**
(Australia) T Morton-Rodgers (United States) V Paynter	**6**	3	4
3	(United States) **K Adams** (Netherlands) **M Bollegraf**	4	**6**	**6**
Q	(United States) S Cacic (Canada) H Kelesi	6	0
2	(United States) **Z Garrison-Jackson** (United States) **L McNeil**	**7**	**6**

Semifinals
1	(United States) **P Fendick** (United States) **M McGrath**	**7**	**6**
(United States) C Benjamin (United States) M Jackson-Nobrega	5	2
3	(United States) **K Adams** (Netherlands) **M Bollegraf**	**6**	3	**6**
2	(United States) Z Garrison-Jackson (United States) L McNeil	3	**6**	4

Final
1	(United States) **Patty Fendick** (United States) **Meredith McGrath**	**7**	**6**
3	(United States) Katrina Adams (Netherlands) Manon Bollegraf	6	2
