= 2004 Kroger St. Jude International and the Cellular South Cup =

2004 Kroger St. Jude International and Cellular South Cup
- Date: February 15–22
- Edition: 34th (men) / 3rd (women)
- Surface: Hard / indoor
- Location: Memphis, TN, United States
- Venue: Racquet Club of Memphis

Champions

Men's singles
- (Sweden) Joachim Johansson

Women's singles
- (Russia) Vera Zvonareva

Men's doubles
- (United States) Bob Bryan / (United States) Mike Bryan

Women's doubles
- (Sweden) Åsa Svensson / (United States) Meilen Tu
← 2003 ·	Kroger St. Jude International	· 2005 →
← 2003 ·	Cellular South Cup	· 2005 →

The 2004 Kroger St. Jude International and the Cellular South Cup were tennis tournaments played on indoor hard courts at the Racquet Club of Memphis in Memphis, Tennessee in the United States that were part of the International Series Gold of the 2004 ATP Tour and of Tier III of the 2004 WTA Tour. The tournaments ran from February 15 through February 22, 2004.

== Finals ==
=== Men's singles ===
(Sweden) Joachim Johansson defeated (Germany) Nicolas Kiefer 7–6^{(7–5)}, 6–3

- It was Johansson's only title of the year and the 1st of his career.

=== Women's singles ===
(Russia) Vera Zvonareva defeated (United States) Lisa Raymond 4–6, 6–4, 7–5

- It was Zvonareva's 1st title of the year and the 2nd of her career.

=== Men's doubles ===
(United States) Bob Bryan / (United States) Mike Bryan defeated (South Africa) Jeff Coetzee / (South Africa) Chris Haggard 6–3, 6–4

- It was Bob Bryan's 2nd title of the year and the 16th of his career. It was Mike Bryan's 2nd title of the year and the 18th of his career.

=== Women's doubles ===
(Sweden) Åsa Svensson / (United States) Meilen Tu defeated (Russia) Maria Sharapova / (Russia) Vera Zvonareva 6–4, 7–6^{(7–0)}

- It was Svensson's only title of the year and the 9th of her career. It was Tu's only title of the year and the 5th of her career.
