= Tanner Cochran =

American tennis player

- Full name: Tanner Cochran Evans
- Country (sports): United States
- Born: August 3, 1984 (age 40); Dublin, Georgia, U.S.
- Plays: Right-handed
- Prize money: $57,396

Singles
- Highest ranking: No. 236 (June 9, 2003)

Doubles
- Highest ranking: No. 242 (February 23, 2004)

Grand Slam doubles results
- US Open: 1R (2000, 2002)

Tanner Cochran Evans (born August 3, 1984) is a former professional tennis player from the United States.

== Biography ==
=== Tennis career ===
A right-handed player from Dublin, Georgia, Cochran debuted at the US Open main draw as a 16 year-old in 2000, partnering Kristen Schlukebir in the women's doubles. As a junior, she and Schlukebir were semi-finalists in the girls' doubles event at the 2001 Open and she reached the round of 16 of the girls' singles at the 2002 US Open, which included a win over Ana Ivanovic.

From 2002 she played as a professional and won a $25,000 ITF singles title that year at Allentown, in addition to a second US Open doubles appearance. Cochran, who had a best ranking of 236 in the world, played in the main draw of a WTA Tour tournament for the only time at the 2003 Kroger St. Jude International in Memphis.

=== Personal life ===
She is married to former Los Angeles Angels baseball player Terry Evans.
