= 2006 Cellular South Cup – Singles =

Singles
- 2006 Regions Morgan Keegan Championships and the Cellular South Cup

Final
- Champion: (Sweden) Sofia Arvidsson
- Runner-up: (Poland) Marta Domachowska
- Score: 6–2, 2–6, 6–3

Details
- Draw: 32
- Seeds: 8

Events
Singles	men	women
Doubles	men	women
- Regions Morgan Keegan Championships Cellular South Cup

Vera Zvonareva was the defending champion, but chose to compete in Dubai this week.

Sofia Arvidsson won the title by defeating Marta Domachowska 6–2, 2–6, 6–3 in the final.

== Seeds ==
1. (Czech Republic) Nicole Vaidišová (first round)
2. (Germany) Anna-Lena Grönefeld (second round)
3. (Sweden) Sofia Arvidsson (champion)
4. (United States) Laura Granville (quarterfinals)
5. (Australia) Samantha Stosur (first round)
6. (Poland) Marta Domachowska (final)
7. (United States) Amy Frazier (semifinals)
8. (United States) Jill Craybas (semifinals)

== Draw ==
Key

- Q = Qualifier
- WC = Wild card
- LL = Lucky loser
- Alt = Alternate
- ITF = ITF entry
- PR = Protected ranking
- SR = Special ranking
- SE = Special exempt
- JE = Junior exempt
- JR = Junior Accelerator Programme entrant
- CO = College Accelerator Programme entrant
- NG = Next Gen Accelerator Program entrant
- w/o = Walkover
- r = Retired
- d = Defaulted

=== Finals ===
Semifinals
8	(United States) Jill Craybas	1	0
6	(Poland) Marta Domachowska	6	6
3	(Sweden) Sofia Arvidsson	6	6
7	(United States) Amy Frazier	2	2

Final
6	(Poland) Marta Domachowska	2	6	3
3	(Sweden) Sofia Arvidsson	6	2	6

=== Top half ===
First round
1	(Czech Republic) N Vaidišová	6^{5}	6	4
WC	(Belarus) V Azarenka	7^{7}	2	6
(United States) L Osterloh	7^{7}	6
(Finland) E Laine	6^{2}	2
Q	(China) M Yuan	3	6	6
(Uzbekistan) V Lepchenko	6	4	4
(Germany) S Klösel	5	1
8	(United States) J Craybas	7	6
4	(United States) L Granville	6	6
(United States) M Shaughnessy	3	4
(Hungary) M Czink	6	2	2
(Ukraine) T Perebiynis	4	6	6
(Slovakia) M Suchá	6	6
(Russia) T Panova	1	0
Q	(United States) A Haynes	2	0
6	(Poland) M Domachowska	6	6

Second round
WC	(Belarus) V Azarenka	4	7	5
(United States) L Osterloh	6	5	7
Q	(China) M Yuan	4	2
8	(United States) J Craybas	6	6
4	(United States) L Granville	6	6
(Ukraine) T Perebiynis	1	2
(Slovakia) M Suchá	3	3
6	(Poland) M Domachowska	6	6

Quarterfinals
(United States) L Osterloh	4	1
8	(United States) J Craybas	6	6
4	(United States) L Granville	4	4
6	(Poland) M Domachowska	6	6

Semifinals
8	(United States) J Craybas	1	0
6	(Poland) M Domachowska	6	6

=== Bottom half ===
First round
5	(Australia) S Stosur	4	3
(United States) A Harkleroad	6	6
WC	(Denmark) C Wozniacki	6	3	7
(Puerto Rico) K Brandi	3	6	5
(United States) L Raymond	6	6
Q	(Lithuania) L Stančiūtė	3	2
WC	(United States) A Stevenson	2	4
3	(Sweden) A Arvidsson	6	6
7	(United States) A Frazier	6	6
(United States) M Tu	2	1
Q	(Russia) Y Shvedova	6	6
(United States) J Jackson	3	1
(Russia) E Bychkova	3	6^{2}
(United States) S Perry	6	7^{7}
(South Korea) Y-j Cho	3	2
2	(Germany) A-L Grönefeld	6	6

Second round
(United States) A Harkleroad	2	3
WC	(Denmark) C Wozniacki	6	6
(United States) L Raymond	4	4
3	(Sweden) A Arvidsson	6	6
7	(United States) A Frazier	1	6	6
Q	(Russia) Y Shvedova	6	0	0
(United States) S Perry	7^{7}	6
2	(Germany) A-L Grönefeld	6^{5}	2

Quarterfinals
WC	(Denmark) C Wozniacki	5	4
3	(Sweden) A Arvidsson	7	6
7	(United States) A Frazier	6	3	7^{7}
(United States) S Perry	3	6	6^{3}

Semifinals
3	(Sweden) A Arvidsson	6	6
7	(United States) A Frazier	2	2
