= 2006 Regions Morgan Keegan Championships – Singles =

Singles
- 2006 Regions Morgan Keegan Championships and the Cellular South Cup

Final
- Champion: (Germany) Tommy Haas
- Runner-up: (Sweden) Robin Söderling
- Score: 6–3, 6–2

Details
- Draw: 32
- Seeds: 8

Events
Singles	men	women
Doubles	men	women
- Regions Morgan Keegan Championships Cellular South Cup

Kenneth Carlsen was the defending champion but lost in the second round to Robin Söderling.

Tommy Haas is the champion defeating Robin Söderling in the finals 6–3, 6–2.

== Seeds ==
1. (United States) Andy Roddick (quarterfinals)
2. (Sweden) Jonas Björkman (first round)
3. (Spain) Tommy Robredo (first round)
4. (United States) Robby Ginepri (first round)
5. (United States) James Blake (first round)
6. (Germany) Tommy Haas (champion)
7. (Belarus) Max Mirnyi (first round)
8. (Belgium) Xavier Malisse (second round)

== Draw ==
Key

- Q = Qualifier
- WC = Wild card
- LL = Lucky loser
- Alt = Alternate
- ITF = ITF entry
- PR = Protected ranking
- SR = Special ranking
- SE = Special exempt
- JE = Junior exempt
- JR = Junior Accelerator Programme entrant
- CO = College Accelerator Programme entrant
- NG = Next Gen Accelerator Program entrant
- w/o = Walkover
- r = Retired
- d = Defaulted

=== Finals ===
Semifinals
Q	(France) Julien Benneteau	3	1
6	(Germany) Tommy Haas	6	6
(Belgium) Kristof Vliegen	5	6	6^{5}
(Sweden) Robin Söderling	7	2	7^{7}

Final
6	(Germany) Tommy Haas	6	6
(Sweden) Robin Söderling	3	2

=== Top half ===
First round
1	(United States) A Roddick	6	6^{5}	7^{7}
WC	(United States) M Fish	3	7^{7}	6^{2}
(Australia) W Arthurs	6	7^{7}
(Czech Republic) T Zíb	4	6^{2}
Q	(France) J Benneteau	3	6	7^{7}
(Chinese Taipei) Y-T Wang	6	3	6^{2}
8	(Belgium) X Malisse	6	6
(Germany) B Phau	1	4
(Russia) D Tursunov	7	7^{7}
4	(United States) R Ginepri	5	6^{4}
(France) C Saulnier	6	6
(Spain) G García López	3	4
(United States) V Spadea	6	5	7^{7}
(United States) B Reynolds	2	7	6^{2}
6	(Germany) T Haas	2
Q	(United States) J Gimelstob	1^{r}

Second round
1	(United States) A Roddick	6^{4}	7^{11}	7^{7}
(Australia) W Arthurs	7^{7}	6^{9}	6^{2}
Q	(France) J Benneteau	7^{7}	6
8	(Belgium) X Malisse	6^{4}	4
(Russia) D Tursunov	6	6^{3}	6
(France) C Saulnier	0	7^{7}	3
(United States) V Spadea	6^{7}	1
6	(Germany) T Haas	7^{9}	6

Quarterfinals
1	(United States) A Roddick	6	4	6^{4}
Q	(France) J Benneteau	3	6	7^{7}
(Russia) D Tursunov	7^{7}	4	4
6	(Germany) T Haas	6^{4}	6	6

Semifinals
Q	(France) J Benneteau	3	1
6	(Germany) T Haas	6	6

=== Bottom half ===
First round
(Belgium) K Vliegen	6	6
5	(United States) J Blake	4	4
(United States) P Goldstein	6	6
WC	(United States) S Jenkins	4	3
(Croatia) I Karlović	6^{3}	7^{7}	6
Q	(Denmark) K Pless	7^{7}	6^{4}	4
Q	(Chile) P Capdeville	4	7^{7}	6
3	(Spain) T Robredo	6	6^{3}	4
(Sweden) R Söderling	6	6
7	(Belarus) M Mirnyi	0	1
(Denmark) K Carlsen	7^{7}	6
LL	(Australia) P Luczak	6^{4}	3
(United Kingdom) A Murray	1	7	6
(Germany) R Schüttler	6	5	2
LL	(South Africa) R De Voest	6	6
2	(Sweden) J Björkman	4	3

Second round
(Belgium) K Vliegen	6	6
(United States) P Goldstein	1	4
(Croatia) I Karlović	6^{1}	6	5
Q	(Chile) P Capdeville	7^{7}	3	7
(Sweden) R Söderling	7^{7}	6
(Denmark) K Carlsen	6^{3}	4
(United Kingdom) A Murray	7^{7}	3	7
LL	(South Africa) R de Voest	6^{4}	6	5

Quarterfinals
(Belgium) K Vliegen	3	7^{7}	6
Q	(Chile) P Capdeville	6	6^{5}	4
(Sweden) R Söderling	6	6
(United Kingdom) A Murray	1	4

Semifinals
(Belgium) K Vliegen	5	6	6^{5}
(Sweden) R Söderling	7	2	7^{7}
