= 2005 Regions Morgan Keegan Championships and the Cellular South Cup =

2005 Regions Morgan Keegan Championships and Cellular South Cup
- Date: February 14–20
- Edition: 30th (men); 20th (women)
- Category: International Series Gold (men); Tier III (women)
- Surface: Hard / Indoor
- Location: Memphis, TN, United States
- Venue: Racquet Club of Memphis

Champions

Men's singles
- (Denmark) Kenneth Carlsen

Women's singles
- (Russia) Vera Zvonareva

Men's doubles
- (Sweden) Simon Aspelin / (Australia) Todd Perry

Women's doubles
- (Japan) Miho Saeki / (Japan) Yuka Yoshida
- Regions Morgan Keegan Championships Cellular South Cup

The 2005 Regions Morgan Keegan Championships and the Cellular South Cup were tennis tournaments played on indoor hard courts. It was the 30th edition of the Regions Morgan Keegan Championships, the 20th edition of the Cellular South Cup, and was part of the International Series Gold of the 2005 ATP Tour, and of the Tier III Series of the 2005 WTA Tour. Both the men's and the women's events took place at the Racquet Club of Memphis in Memphis, Tennessee, United States, from February 14 through February 20, 2005.

== Finals ==
=== Men's singles ===
(Denmark) Kenneth Carlsen defeated (Belarus) Max Mirnyi, 7–5, 7–5

=== Women's singles ===
(Russia) Vera Zvonareva defeated (United States) Meghann Shaughnessy, 7–6^{(7–3)}, 6–2

=== Men's doubles ===
(Sweden) Simon Aspelin / (Australia) Todd Perrey defeated (United States) Bob Bryan / (United States) Mike Bryan, 6–4, 6–4

=== Women's doubles ===
(Japan) Miho Saeki / (Japan) Yuka Yoshida defeated (United States) Laura Granville / (United States) Abigail Spears 6–3, 6–4
