= 2003 Kroger St. Jude International =

- Date: February 16–23
- Edition: 33rd (men) / 2nd (women)
- Surface: Hard / Indoor
- Location: Memphis, TN, United States
- Venue: Racquet Club of Memphis

Champions

Men's singles
- (United States) Taylor Dent

Women's singles
- (United States) Lisa Raymond

Men's doubles
- (The Bahamas) Mark Knowles / (Canada) Daniel Nestor

Women's doubles
- (Japan) Akiko Morigami / (Japan) Saori Obata
- U.S. National Indoor Championships

The 2003 Kroger St. Jude International was a tennis tournament played on indoor hard courts at the Racquet Club of Memphis in Memphis, Tennessee in the United States that was part of the International Series Gold of the 2003 ATP Tour and of Tier III of the 2003 WTA Tour. The tournament ran from February 16 through February 23, 2003.

== Finals ==
=== Men's singles ===
(United States) Taylor Dent defeated (United States) Andy Roddick 6–1, 6–4

- It was Dent's 1st title of the year and the 2nd of his career.

=== Women's singles ===
(United States) Lisa Raymond defeated (South Africa) Amanda Coetzer 6–3, 6–2

- It was Raymond's 1st title of the year and the 42nd of her career.

=== Men's doubles ===
(The Bahamas) Mark Knowles / (Canada) Daniel Nestor defeated (United States) Bob Bryan / (United States) Mike Bryan 6–2, 7–6^{(7–3)}

- It was Knowles' 1st title of the year and the 25th of his career. It was Nestor's 1st title of the year and the 27th of his career.

=== Women's doubles ===
(Japan) Akiko Morigami / (Japan) Saori Obata defeated (Russia) Alina Jidkova / (Australia) Bryanne Stewart 6–1, 6–1

- It was Morigami's only title of the year and the 1st of her career. It was Obata's only title of the year and the 1st of her career.
