= Lindsay Lee-Waters =

American tennis player (born 1977)

Lindsay Lee–Waters
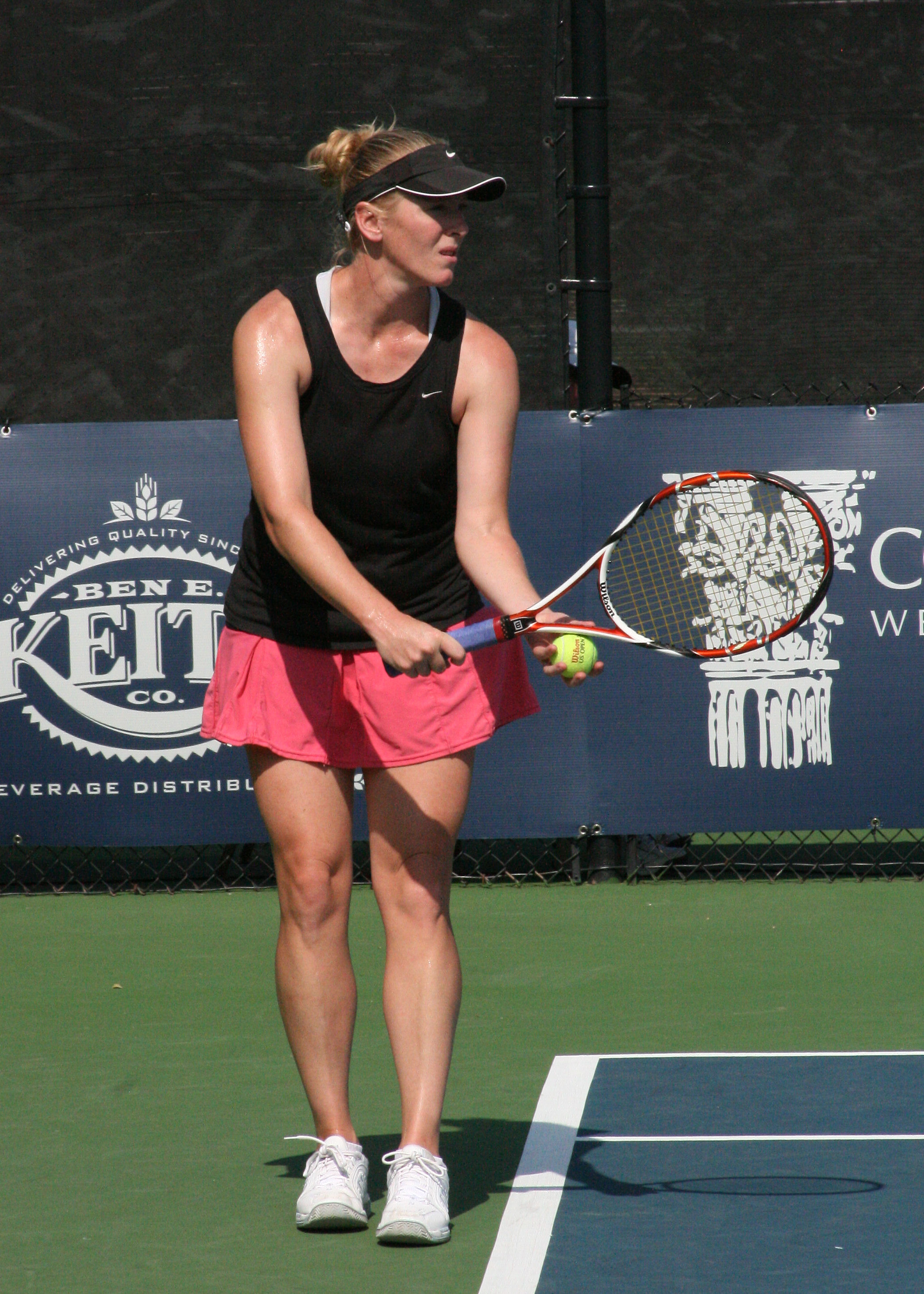
- Country (sports): United States
- Residence: Dunwoody, United States
- Born: June 28, 1977 (age 48) Oklahoma City, United States
- Height: 1.73 m (5 ft 8 in)
- Turned pro: 1994
- Plays: Right-handed (two-handed backhand)
- Prize money: US$ 859,911

Singles
- Career record: 485–402
- Career titles: 11 ITF
- Highest ranking: No. 33 (April 1, 1996)

Grand Slam singles results
- Australian Open: 2R (1997, 2004, 2005)
- French Open: 1R (1996, 2003, 2004)
- Wimbledon: 2R (1995)
- US Open: 2R (1995, 2004)

Doubles
- Career record: 303–229
- Career titles: 21 ITF
- Highest ranking: No. 85 (February 25, 2013)

Grand Slam doubles results
- Australian Open: 2R (1998)
- French Open: 1R (1996, 1998, & 2005)
- Wimbledon: 1R (1998–2011-2012)
- US Open: 2R (1996)

Lindsay Lee-Waters (born June 28, 1977) is an American former professional tennis player.

Lee-Waters has a career-high WTA singles ranking of No. 33, achieved on 1 April 1996. She also has a career-high WTA doubles ranking of 85, achieved on 25 February 2013. Lee-Waters won eleven singles and 21 doubles titles on the ITF Women's Circuit.

Her results on the WTA Tour include semifinals at the Bell Challenge 1995 and British Hard Court Championships, and Canberra International, as well as the quarterfinals of Indian Wells in 1996.

== Personal life and career ==
Lindsay Lee married her coach Heath Waters on March 7, 2000. Heath Waters is the owner of Strive Tennis Academy in Atlanta. Lee-Waters gave birth to their daughter Sevyn on January 13, 2001, and later to their son Heath Paul on April 24, 2006. Born in Oklahoma City to Ron and Pat, she currently resides with her family in Dunwoody, Georgia.

Lee-Waters started playing tennis at the age of eight at the suggestion of a spectator at her baseball game. When she was 15, she moved from Owasso, Oklahoma, to Atlanta, Georgia to train. Lee-Waters has an all-court style of play and her favorite surfaces are hardcourt and clay; favorite shot is the return.

In 2020, Lee-Waters and her husband Heath developed the Match Tennis App.

== Awards and nominations ==
- 1995 — WTA Most Impressive Newcomer (nomination)

== Grand Slam performance timelines ==
Key
W	F	SF	QF	#R	RR	Q#	DNQ	A	NH

(W) winner; (F) finalist; (SF) semifinalist; (QF) quarterfinalist; (#R) rounds 4, 3, 2, 1; (RR) round-robin stage; (Q#) qualification round; (DNQ) did not qualify; (A) absent; (NH) not held; (SR) strike rate (events won / competed); (W–L) win–loss record.

=== Singles ===
Tournament	1995	1996	1997	2003	2004	2005	SR	W–L
Australian Open		1R	2R	1R	2R	2R	0 / 5	3–5
French Open		1R		1R	1R		0 / 3	0–3
Wimbledon	2R			1R	1R		0 / 3	1–3
US Open	2R	1R	1R		2R	1R	0 / 5	2–5
Win–loss	2–2	0–3	1–2	0–3	2–4	1–2	0 / 16	6–16

=== Doubles ===
Tournament	1995	1996	1997	1998	1999	2004	2005	2006	2011	2012	SR	W–L
Australian Open				2R	1R						0 / 2	1–2
French Open		1R		1R			1R				0 / 3	0–3
Wimbledon				1R					1R	1R	0 / 3	0–3
US Open	1R	2R	1R	1R	1R	1R	1R	1R		1R	0 / 9	1–9
Win–loss	0–1	1–2	0–1	1–4	0–2	0–1	0–2	0–1	0–1	0–2	0 / 17	2–17

== ITF Circuit finals ==
Legend
$100,000 tournaments
$75,000 tournaments
$50,000 tournaments
$25,000 tournaments
$10,000 tournaments

=== Singles: 23 (11 titles, 12 runner-ups) ===
Result	No.	Date	Tournament	Surface	Opponent	Score
Loss	1.	May 1994	ITF Acapulco, Mexico	Clay	(Chile) Paula Cabezas	2–6, 2–6
Loss	2.	Aug 1994	ITF College Park, United States	Hard	(United States) Laxmi Poruri	3–6, 2–6
Loss	3.	Jan 1995	ITF San Antonio, United States	Hard	(Germany) Sabine Haas	6–7^{(6–8)}, 0–6
Win	4.	Jan 1995	ITF Woodlands, United States	Hard	(China) Jody Yin	6–4, 6–4
Win	5.	Mar 1995	ITF Miami, United States	Hard	(United States) Tara Snyder	6–2, 6–3
Loss	6.	Feb 1996	ITF Midland, United States	Hard	(Russia) Anna Kournikova	6–7^{(2–7)}, 1–6
Loss	7.	Jul 1997	ITF Flushing Meadows, United States	Hard	(China) Li Fang	5–7, 5–7
Win	8.	Apr 1998	ITF Burbank, United States	Hard	(United States) Jolene Watanabe	6–4, 6–4
Win	9.	Jan 2000	ITF Boca Raton, United States	Hard	(Czech Republic) Olga Blahotová	6–2, 3–6, 6–3
Loss	10.	Mar 2000	ITF Stone Mountain, United States	Hard	(United States) Dawn Buth	3–6, 6–4, 1–6
Loss	11.	Jan 2002	ITF Miami, United States	Hard	(Hungary) Melinda Czink	5–7, 2–6
Loss	12.	Jun 2002	ITF Allentown, United States	Hard	(United States) Tanner Cochran	4–6, 6–3, 4–6
Win	13.	Sep 2002	ITF Columbus, United States	Hard	(United States) Ashley Harkleroad	1–6, 6–1, 7–6^{(11–9)}
Win	14.	Oct 2002	ITF Hallandale Beach, United States	Clay	(Argentina) Gisela Dulko	7–5, 3–6, 6–1
Win	15.	Oct 2003	ITF Lafayette, United States	Clay	(South Africa) Natalie Grandin	6–2, 6–0
Win	16.	Dec 2003	ITF Palm Beach Gardens, United States	Clay	(Spain) Marta Marrero	6–3, 6–3
Win	17.	Feb 2004	ITF Rockford, United States	Hard (i)	(Argentina) Gisela Dulko	6–4, 7–5
Loss	18.	Jun 2005	ITF Allentown, United States	Hard	(Uzbekistan) Varvara Lepchenko	6–7^{(3–7)}, 4–6
Win	19.	Jul 2005	ITF Los Gatos, United States	Hard	(United States) Carly Gullickson	6–4, 6–0
Win	20.	May 2009	ITF Charlottesville, United States	Clay	(Russia) Ekaterina Bychkova	6–3, 7–5
Loss	21.	May 2009	Raleigh Challenger, United States	Clay	(United States) Melanie Oudin	1–6, 6–2, 4–6
Loss	22.	May 2010	Raleigh Challenger, United States	Clay	(United Kingdom) Johanna Konta	6–2, 5–7, 6–4
Loss	23.	Sep 2010	ITF Albuquerque, United States	Hard	(Croatia) Mirjana Lučić-Baroni	1–6, 4–6

=== Doubles: 47 (21 titles, 26 runner-ups) ===
Result	No.	Date	Tournament	Surface	Partner	Opponents	Score
Loss	1.	Jun 1994	ITF Washington, United States	Hard	(United Kingdom) Emily Bond	(United States) Annie Miller (Canada) Stephanie Tibbits	5–7, 4–6
Loss	2.	Aug 1994	ITF College Park, United States	Hard	(United States) Marissa Catlin	(Australia) Gail Biggs (Slovenia) Tjasa Jezernik	4–6, 5–7
Loss	3.	Feb 1995	ITF Miami, United States	Hard	(United Kingdom) Emily Bond	(United States) Elly Hakami (United States) Stephanie Reece	1–6, 1–6
Loss	4.	Feb 1997	Midland Tennis Classic, United States	Hard (i)	(Chinese Taipei) Janet Lee	(United States) Angela Lettiere (Japan) Nana Smith	3–6, 2–6
Win	5.	Jun 1997	ITF Flushing Meadows, United States	Hard	(Chinese Taipei) Janet Lee	(United States) Keri Phebus (China) Fang Li	6–2, 2–6, 6–3
Loss	6.	Jul 1997	ITF Clearwater, United States	Hard (i)	(Canada) Maureen Drake	(United Kingdom) Julie Pullin (United Kingdom) Amanda Wainwright	4–6, 4–6
Win	7.	Mar 1998	ITF Rockford, United States	Hard	(South Africa) Surina De Beer	(Netherlands) Seda Noorlander (Georgia (country)) Nino Louarsabishvili	6–2, 6–4
Loss	8.	Sep 1998	ITF Santa Clara, United States	Hard	(Canada) Maureen Drake	(Zimbabwe) Cara Black (Kazakhstan) Irina Selyutina	4–6, 7–5, 3–6
Win	9.	Oct 1998	ITF Indian Wells, United States	Hard	(New Zealand) Pavlina Nola	(United States) Erika deLone (United States) Katie Schlukebir	6–0, 6–7^{(4–7)}, 6–1
Win	10.	Oct 1998	ITF Austin, United States	Hard	(Canada) Maureen Drake	(South Africa) Nannie de Villiers (South Africa) Liezel Horn	6–1, 6–1
Win	11.	Nov 1998	ITF Guadalajara, Mexico	Hard	(United States) Meghann Shaughnessy	(Brazil) Miriam D'Agostini (Hungary) Katalin Marosi	6–1, 6–3
Win	12.	May 1999	ITF Jackson, United States	Clay	(United States) Julie Steven	(Canada) Renata Kolbovic (United States) Tracy Singian	4–6, 7–5, 6–2
Loss	13.	Jun 1999	ITF Hilton Head, United States	Hard	(United States) Wendy Fix	(Canada) Vanessa Webb (United States) Dawn Buth	2–6, 6–4, 3–6
Win	14.	Jun 1999	ITF Mount Pleasant, United States	Hard	(United States) Wendy Fix	(Slovenia) Petra Rampre (United States) Jennifer Hopkins	6–3, 7–6^{(9–7)}
Win	15.	Jun 1999	ITF Easton, United States	Hard	(South Africa) Kim Grant	(United States) Holly Parkinson (United States) Julie Scott	6–4, 7–6^{(9–7)}
Win	16.	Jan 2000	ITF Boca Raton, United States	Hard	(United States) Sandra Cacic	(China) Li Ting (China) Li Na	6–4, 7–5
Loss	17.	Jan 2000	ITF Clearwater, United States	Hard	(United States) Sandra Cacic	(South Korea) Cho Yoon-jeong (China) Yi Jingqian	4–6, 6–7^{(7–9)}
Loss	18.	Mar 2000	ITF Norcross, United States	Hard	(South Africa) Jessica Steck	(Germany) Julia Abe (Israel) Tzipora Obziler	7–5, 6–7^{(7–9)}, 4–6
Loss	19.	Sep 2001	ITF Greenville, United States	Hard	(France) Gaelle Adda	(Hungary) Melinda Czink (Georgia (country)) Salome Devidze	1–6, 4–6
Loss	20.	May 2002	ITF Sea Islands, United States	Clay	(United States) Courtenay Chapman	(United States) Tanner Cochran (United States) Ashley Harkleroad	3–6, 2–6
Loss	21.	Oct 2003	Tennis Classic of Troy, United States	Hard	(Slovenia) Petra Rampre	(United States) Bethanie Mattek-Sands (United States) Shenay Perry	2–6, 6–2, 4–6
Win	22.	Oct 2003	ITF LaFayette, United States	Hard	(Canada) Maureen Drake	(Mexico) Jessica Fernández (United States) Kara Molony-Hussey	6–2, 6–3
Win	23.	May 2005	Raleigh Challenger, United States	Clay	(United States) Ashley Harkleroad	(Brazil) Maria Fernanda Alves (Canada) Stéphanie Dubois	6–2, 0–6, 6–3
Win	24.	May 2005	ITF Charlottesville, United States	Clay	(United States) Ashley Harkleroad	(United States) Samantha Reeves (Australia) Christina Wheeler	6–4, 7–5
Loss	25.	Jun 2005	ITF Los Gatos, United States	Hard	(United States) Kaysie Smashey	(United States) Teryn Ashley (United States) Carly Gullickson	4–6, 6–4, 1–6
Loss	26.	Jun 2005	ITF Indian Harbour Beach, United States	Clay	(United States) Carly Gullickson	(Australia) Monique Adamczak (United States) Angela Haynes	1–6, 6–3, 4–6
Loss	27.	May 2007	Carson Challenger, United States	Hard	(United States) Angela Haynes	(South Africa) Kim Grant (United States) Sunitha Rao	4–6, 4–6
Loss	28.	Jun 2007	ITF Allentown, United States	Hard	(United States) Angela Haynes	(Japan) Ryōko Fuda (United States) Sunitha Rao	7–6, 4–6, 1–6
Win	29.	Jul 2007	Lexington Challenger, United States	Hard	(Hungary) Melinda Czink	(Australia) Casey Dellacqua (South Africa) Natalie Grandin	6–2, 7–6^{(10–8)}
Loss	30.	Jun 2008	ITF El Paso, United States	Hard	(United States) Ashley Weinhold	(South Africa) Surina De Beer (United States) Lauren Albanese	3–6, 3–6
Loss	31.	Jul 2008	Lexington Challenger, United States	Hard	(United States) Melanie Oudin	(Chinese Taipei) Chan Chin-wei (United States) Kimberly Couts	6–2, 2–6, [8–10]
Win	32.	Oct 2008	ITF Pittsburgh, United States	Hard	(Hungary) Melinda Czink	(United States) Raquel Kops-Jones (United States) Abigail Spears	6–2, 7–5
Loss	33.	Feb 2009	Midland Tennis Classic, United States	Hard	(Hungary) Melinda Czink	(Chinese Taipei) Chen Yi (Japan) Rika Fujiwara	5–7, 6–7^{(7–9)}
Win	34.	Apr 2009	ITF Osprey, United States	Clay	(United States) Story Tweedie-Yates	(Canada) Heidi El Tabakh (Austria) Melanie Klaffner	6–3, 6–7^{(5–7)}, [12–10]
Win	35.	Jul 2009	ITF Grapevine, United States	Hard	(United States) Riza Zalameda	(United States) Kimberly Couts (Canada) Valérie Tétreault	7–6^{(9–7)}, 6–3
Loss	36.	Sep 2009	ITF Albuquerque, United States	Hard	(Hungary) Melinda Czink	(United States) Mashona Washington (United States) Riza Zalameda	3–6, 2–6
Loss	37.	Sep 2009	Las Vegas Open, United States	Hard	(United States) Kimberly Couts	(Hungary) Anikó Kapros (Argentina) Agustina Lepore	2–6, 5–7
Win	38.	May 2010	Carson Challenger, United States	Hard	(United States) Megan Moulton-Levy	(United States) Christina Fusano (United States) Courtney Nagle	6–1, 6–2
Loss	39.	Jun 2010	ITF El Paso, United States	Hard	(United States) Ashley Weinhold	(United States) Angela Haynes (United States) Ahsha Rolle	3–6, 7–6 ^{(7–5)}, 5–7
Loss	40.	Jun 2010	ITF Boston, United States	Hard	(United States) Megan Moulton-Levy	(United States) Kimberly Couts (Ukraine) Tetiana Luzhanska	6–4, 3–6, [10–8]
Win	41.	Jul 2010	ITF Grapevine, United States	Hard	(United States) Megan Moulton-Levy	(United States) Kimberly Couts (Ukraine) Tetiana Luzhanska	6–2, 7–5
Win	42.	Sep 2010	ITF Albuquerque, United States	Hard	(United States) Megan Moulton-Levy	(United States) Abigail Spears (United States) Mashona Washington	2–6, 6–3, [10–8]
Win	43.	Sep 2010	Las Vegas Open, United States	Hard	(United States) Megan Moulton-Levy	(United States) Irina Falconi (United States) Maria Sanchez	1–6, 7–5, [10–4]
Loss	44.	May 2011	Prague Open, Czech Republic	Clay	(United States) Megan Moulton-Levy	(Czech Republic) Petra Cetkovská (Netherlands) Michaëlla Krajicek	2–6, 1–6
Loss	45.	Jul 2011	Lexington Challenger, United States	Hard	(United States) Megan Moulton-Levy	(Belgium) Tamaryn Hendler (United States) Chiara Scholl	6–7^{(9–11)}, 6–3, [7–10]
Loss	46.	Nov 2011	ITF Grapevine, United States	Hard	(United States) Megan Moulton-Levy	(United States) Jamie Hampton (China) Zhang Shuai	4–6, 0–6
Win	47.	Mar 2012	ITF Osprey, United States	Clay	(United States) Megan Moulton-Levy	(Russia) Alexandra Panova (Ukraine) Lesia Tsurenko	2–6, 6–4, [10–7]
