= 2008 Cellular South Cup – Doubles =

Doubles
- 2008 Regions Morgan Keegan Championships and the Cellular South Cup

Final
- Champions: (United States) Lindsay Davenport (United States) Lisa Raymond
- Runners-up: (United States) Angela Haynes (United States) Mashona Washington
- Score: 6–3, 6–1

Details
- Draw: 16
- Seeds: 4

Events
Singles	men	women
Doubles	men	women
← 2007 ·	Regions Morgan Keegan Championships	· 2009 →
← 2007 ·	Cellular South Cup	· 2009 →

Nicole Pratt and Bryanne Stewart were the defending champions, but Pratt chose not to participate, and only Stewart competed that year.
Stewart partnered with Alina Jidkova, but lost in the first round to Maret Ani and Séverine Brémond.

Lindsay Davenport and Lisa Raymond won in the final 6–3, 6–1, against Angela Haynes and Mashona Washington.

== Seeds ==
1. (United States) Bethanie Mattek / (Czech Republic) Renata Voráčová (quarterfinals)
2. (Russia) Alina Jidkova / (Australia) Bryanne Stewart (first round)
3. (United States) Lindsay Davenport / (United States) Lisa Raymond (champions)
4. (Latvia) Līga Dekmeijere / (Turkey) İpek Şenoğlu (first round)

== Draw ==
=== Key ===
- Q = Qualifier
- WC = Wild card
- LL = Lucky loser
- Alt = Alternate
- SE = Special exempt
- PR = Protected ranking
- ITF = ITF entry
- JE = Junior exempt
- w/o = Walkover
- r = Retired
- d = Defaulted
- SR = Special ranking

=== Draw ===
First round
1	(United States) B Mattek (Czech Republic) R Voráčová	6	6
(Russia) M Kondratieva (Czech Republic) H Šromová	1	3
(Canada) S Dubois (United States) L Osterloh	6	2	[6]
(United States) A Haynes (United States) M Washington	2	6	[10]
4	(Latvia) L Dekmeijere (Turkey) İ Şenoğlu	6	2	[2]
(United States) V Lepchenko (Russia) E Rodina	2	6	[10]
(Ukraine) Y Fedak (Belarus) A Yakimova	6	6
WC	(United States) A Glatch (United States) A Liu	2	0
(United States) C Gullickson (United States) S Perry	6	6
(France) S Lefèvre (United States) S Rao	0	4
(New Zealand) L Baker (New Zealand) M Erakovic	0	0
3	(United States) L Davenport (United States) L Raymond	6	6
(Germany) S Klösel (Ukraine) T Luzhankska	4	5
(Sweden) S Arvidsson (Hungary) M Czink	6	7
(Estonia) M Ani (France) S Brémond	6	6
2	(Russia) A Jidkova (Australia) B Stewart	1	3

Quarterfinals
1	(United States) B Mattek (Czech Republic) R Voráčová	3	2
(United States) A Haynes (United States) M Washington	6	6
(United States) V Lepchenko (Russia) E Rodina	6	6
(Ukraine) Y Fedak (Belarus) A Yakimova	4	1
(United States) C Gullickson (United States) S Perry	6^{10}	3
3	(United States) L Davenport (United States) L Raymond	7	6
(Sweden) S Arvidsson (Hungary) M Czink	6	7
(Estonia) M Ani (France) S Brémond	4	5

Semifinals
(United States) A Haynes (United States) M Washington	6	6
(United States) V Lepchenko (Russia) E Rodina	3	1
3	(United States) L Davenport (United States) L Raymond	4	6	[10]
(Sweden) S Arvidsson (Hungary) M Czink	6	2	[3]

Final
(United States) A Haynes (United States) M Washington	3	1
3	(United States) L Davenport (United States) L Raymond	6	6
