= 2007 Regions Morgan Keegan Championships and the Cellular South Cup =

2007 Regions Morgan Keegan Championships and Cellular South Cup
- Date: February 19–25
- Edition: 32nd (men) / 22nd (women)
- Surface: Hard / indoor
- Location: Memphis, TN, United States
- Venue: Racquet Club of Memphis

Champions

Men's singles
- (Germany) Tommy Haas

Women's singles
- (United States) Venus Williams

Men's doubles
- (United States) Eric Butorac / (United Kingdom) Jamie Murray

Women's doubles
- (Australia) Nicole Pratt / (Australia) Bryanne Stewart
← 2006 ·	Regions Morgan Keegan Championships	· 2008 →
← 2006 ·	Cellular South Cup	· 2008 →

The 2007 Regions Morgan Keegan Championships and the Cellular South Cup were tennis tournaments played on indoor hard courts. It was the 32nd edition of the Regions Morgan Keegan Championships, the 22nd edition of the Cellular South Cup, and was part of the International Series Gold of the 2007 ATP Tour, and of the Tier III Series of the 2007 WTA Tour. Both the men's and the women's events took place at the Racquet Club of Memphis in Memphis, Tennessee, United States, from February 17 through February 25, 2007.

The men's draw was led by ATP No. 4, US Open runner-up and Australian Open semifinalist Andy Roddick, other Australian Open semifinalist and Memphis defending champion Tommy Haas, and Doha finalist and San Jose winner Andy Murray. Other seeds were Australian Open quarterfinalist and Auckland semifinalist Mardy Fish, Chennai and Delray Beach champion Xavier Malisse, Jürgen Melzer, Julien Benneteau and Robby Ginepri.

On the women's side were announced Australian Open quarterfinalist and Gold Coast semifinalist Shahar Pe'er, Antwerp semifinalist and Paris quarterfinalist Tatiana Golovin, and Tokyo and Quebec City champion Marion Bartoli. Also present in the field were Tokyo doubles titlist Samantha Stosur, Pattaya City doubles winner Nicole Pratt, Shenay Perry, Venus Williams and Jill Craybas.

== Finals ==
=== Men's singles ===
(Germany) Tommy Haas defeated (United States) Andy Roddick, 6–3, 6–2

- It was Tommy Haas' 1st title of the year, and his 11th overall. It was his 3rd win at the event, and his 2nd consecutive one.

=== Women's singles ===
(United States) Venus Williams defeated (Israel) Shahar Pe'er, 6–1, 6–1

- It was Venus Williams' 1st title of the year, and her 34th overall. It was her 3rd win at the event.

=== Men's doubles ===
(United States) Eric Butorac / (United Kingdom) Jamie Murray defeated (Austria) Julian Knowle / (Austria) Jürgen Melzer, 7–5, 6–3

=== Women's doubles ===
(Australia) Nicole Pratt / (Australia) Bryanne Stewart defeated (Czech Republic) Jarmila Gajdošová / (Japan) Akiko Morigami, 7–5, 4–6, [10–5]
