= 2006 Mondial Australian Women's Hardcourts – Doubles =

Doubles
- 2006 Mondial Australian Women's Hardcourts

Final
- Champions: (Russia) Dinara Safina (United States) Meghann Shaughnessy
- Runners-up: (Zimbabwe) Cara Black (Australia) Rennae Stubbs
- Score: 6–2, 6–3

Events
Singles	Doubles
← 2005 ·	Australian Hard Court Championships	· 2007 →

Elena Likhovtseva and Magdalena Maleeva were the defending champions, but none competed this year. Likhovtseva competed in Auckland at the same week, while Maleeva retired from professional tennis in October 2005.

Dinara Safina and Meghann Shaughnessy won the title by defeating Cara Black and Rennae Stubbs 6–2, 6–3 in the final.

== Seeds ==
1. (Zimbabwe) Cara Black / (Australia) Rennae Stubbs (final)
2. (Russia) Dinara Safina / (United States) Meghann Shaughnessy (champions)
3. (Spain) Anabel Medina Garrigues / (Italy) Flavia Pennetta (semifinals)
4. (China) Li Ting / (China) Sun Tiantian (first round)

== Draw ==
=== Key ===
- Q = Qualifier
- WC = Wild card
- LL = Lucky loser
- Alt = Alternate
- SE = Special exempt
- PR = Protected ranking
- ITF = ITF entry
- JE = Junior exempt
- w/o = Walkover
- r = Retired
- d = Defaulted
- SR = Special ranking

=== Draw ===
First round
1	(Zimbabwe) C Black (Australia) R Stubbs	6	6
(Russia) A Rodionova (Russia) E Vesnina	4	3
(Estonia) M Ani (Australia) N Pratt	3	6	6
(Australia) L McShea (Australia) B Stewart	6	1	4
4	(China) T Li (China) T Sun	1	4
WC	(France) T Golovin (Switzerland) M Hingis	6	6
(Italy) T Garbin (Italy) An Serra Zanetti	3	5
(Switzerland) E Gagliardi (Italy) R Vinci	6	7
(China) N Li (China) Z Yan	6^{5}	5
(Czech Republic) I Benešová (Italy) F Schiavone	7^{7}	7
WC	(Australia) C Dellacqua (Australia) T Musgrave	4	6	2
3	(Spain) A Medina Garrigues (Italy) F Pennetta	6	3	6
(Spain) N Llagostera Vives (Venezuela) M Vento-Kabchi	6	6
Q	(Ukraine) Y Fedak (Belarus) T Poutchek	3	3
(Czech Republic) D Chládková (Spain) C Martínez Granados	3	4
2	(Russia) D Safina (United States) M Shaughnessy	6	6

Quarterfinals
1	(Zimbabwe) C Black (Australia) R Stubbs	6	6^{4}	6
(Estonia) M Ani (Australia) N Pratt	2	7^{7}	4
WC	(France) T Golovin (Switzerland) M Hingis	6	6
(Switzerland) E Gagliardi (Italy) R Vinci	3	4
(Czech Republic) I Benešová (Italy) F Schiavone	2	2
3	(Spain) A Medina Garrigues (Italy) F Pennetta	6	6
(Spain) N Llagostera Vives (Venezuela) M Vento-Kabchi	2	3
2	(Russia) D Safina (United States) M Shaughnessy	6	6

Semifinals
1	(Zimbabwe) C Black (Australia) R Stubbs	w/o
WC	(France) T Golovin (Switzerland) M Hingis
3	(Spain) A Medina Garrigues (Italy) F Pennetta	2	6	6^{7}
2	(Russia) D Safina (United States) M Shaughnessy	6	3	7^{9}

Final
1	(Zimbabwe) C Black (Australia) R Stubbs	2	3
2	(Russia) D Safina (United States) M Shaughnessy	6	6
