= 2007 Regions Morgan Keegan Championships – Singles =

Singles
- 2007 Regions Morgan Keegan Championships and the Cellular South Cup

Final
- Champion: (Germany) Tommy Haas
- Runner-up: (United States) Andy Roddick
- Score: 6–3, 6–2

Details
- Draw: 32
- Seeds: 8

Events
Singles	men	women
Doubles	men	women
← 2006 ·	Regions Morgan Keegan Championships	· 2008 →
← 2006 ·	Cellular South Cup	· 2008 →

Tommy Haas was the defending champion, and won in the final 6–3, 6–2, against Andy Roddick.

== Seeds ==
1. (United States) Andy Roddick (final)
2. (Germany) Tommy Haas (champion)
3. (United Kingdom) Andy Murray (semifinals)
4. (United States) Mardy Fish (semifinals)
5. (Belgium) Xavier Malisse (first round, retired due to a wrist injury)
6. (Austria) Jürgen Melzer (second round, retired due to an illness)
7. (France) Julien Benneteau (second round)
8. (United States) Robby Ginepri (first round)

== Draw ==
=== Key ===
- Q = Qualifier
- WC = Wild card
- LL = Lucky loser
- Alt = Alternate
- SE = Special exempt
- PR = Protected ranking
- ITF = ITF entry
- JE = Junior exempt
- w/o = Walkover
- r = Retired
- d = Defaulted
- SR = Special ranking

=== Finals ===
Semifinals
1	(United States) Andy Roddick	6	7^{7}
3	(United Kingdom) Andy Murray	3	6^{4}
4	(United States) Mardy Fish	3	4
2	(Germany) Tommy Haas	6	6

Final
1	(United States) Andy Roddick	3	2
2	(Germany) Tommy Haas	6	6

=== Top half ===
First round
1	(United States) A Roddick	6	7
(Sweden) T Johansson	2	5
(Germany) B Becker	2	6	6
(United States) R Kendrick	6	3	4
WC	(Australia) C Guccione	6^{4}	3
(Chinese Taipei) Y-h Lu	7^{7}	6
Q	(United States) J Witten	6	3	6^{3}
6	(Austria) J Melzer	1	6	7^{7}
3	(United Kingdom) A Murray	6	4	6
(Canada) F Dancevic	3	6	4
(Denmark) K Pless	6	6
(Russia) I Kunitsyn	3	1
(Austria) S Koubek	6	7^{7}
(Germany) S Greul	3	6^{3}
Q	(Russia) E Korolev	7^{7}	4	6
8	(United States) R Ginepri	6^{4}	6	3

Second round
1	(United States) A Roddick	7^{7}	6
(Germany) B Becker	6^{4}	4
(Chinese Taipei) Y-h Lu	7^{7}	1
6	(Austria) J Melzer	6^{2}	1^{r}
3	(United Kingdom) A Murray	6	7^{7}
(Denmark) K Pless	3	6^{4}
(Austria) S Koubek	7^{7}	6
Q	(Russia) E Korolev	6^{4}	2

Quarterfinals
1	(United States) A Roddick	6	7^{9}
(Chinese Taipei) Y-h Lu	4	6^{7}
3	(United Kingdom) A Murray	6	6
(Austria) S Koubek	3	2

Semifinals
1	(United States) A Roddick	6	7^{7}
3	(United Kingdom) A Murray	3	6^{4}

=== Bottom half ===
First round
5	(Belgium) X Malisse	6	2^{r}
Q	(Russia) T Gabashvili	4	2
WC	(United States) A Kuznetsov	6	2	6
Q	(United States) K Kim	2	6	4
(Argentina) JM del Potro	6	6
(Spain) F López	1	2
(Germany) B Phau	3	2
4	(United States) M Fish	6	6
7	(France) J Benneteau	7	6
(South Korea) H-t Lee	5	3
(Croatia) I Karlović	3	2
WC	(United States) S Querrey	6	6
(United States) P Goldstein	5	6^{0}
(United States) A Delić	7	7^{7}
(United States) V Spadea	4	1
2	(Germany) T Haas	6	6

Second round
Q	(Russia) T Gabashvili	5	6	6
WC	(United States) A Kuznetsov	7	3	4
(Argentina) JM del Potro	1	6^{9}
4	(United States) M Fish	6	7^{11}
7	(France) J Benneteau	3	4
WC	(United States) S Querrey	6	6
(United States) A Delić	6^{2}	6^{3}
2	(Germany) T Haas	7^{7}	7^{7}

Quarterfinals
Q	(Russia) T Gabashvili	2	1^{r}
4	(United States) M Fish	6	4
WC	(United States) S Querrey	2	2
2	(Germany) T Haas	6	6

Semifinals
4	(United States) M Fish	3	4
2	(Germany) T Haas	6	6
