= 2009 Regions Morgan Keegan Championships – Doubles =

Doubles
- 2009 Regions Morgan Keegan Championships and the Cellular South Cup

Final
- Champions: (United States) Mardy Fish (The Bahamas) Mark Knowles
- Runners-up: (United States) Travis Parrott (Slovakia) Filip Polášek
- Score: 7–6^{(9–7)}, 6–1

Events
Singles	men	women
Doubles	men	women
← 2008 ·	Regions Morgan Keegan Championships	· 2010 →
← 2008 ·	Cellular South Cup	· 2010 →

Mahesh Bhupathi and Mark Knowles were the defending champions, although they are not participating this year. However Knowles is appearing with Mardy Fish.

== Seeds ==
1. (Brazil) Marcelo Melo / (Brazil) André Sá (first round)
2. (United Kingdom) Jamie Murray / (Serbia) Dušan Vemić (quarterfinals)
3. (Australia) Paul Hanley / (Australia) Jordan Kerr (quarterfinals)
4. (United States) Mardy Fish / (The Bahamas) Mark Knowles (champions)

== Draw ==
=== Key ===
- Q = Qualifier
- WC = Wild card
- LL = Lucky loser
- Alt = Alternate
- SE = Special exempt
- PR = Protected ranking
- ITF = ITF entry
- JE = Junior exempt
- w/o = Walkover
- r = Retired
- d = Defaulted
- SR = Special ranking

First round
1	(Brazil) M Melo (Brazil) A Sá	6^{5}	6	[7]
(United States) J Cerretani (Australia) A Fisher	7^{7}	4	[10]
(United States) T Parrott (Slovakia) F Polášek	6	7^{7}
WC	(United States) J Isner (United States) S Querrey	3	6^{3}
3	(Australia) P Hanley (Australia) J Kerr	7	6
(United States) S Lipsky (United States) D Martin	5	3
WC	(United States) A Delic (United States) J Levine	2	6^{2}
(Germany) P Petzschner (Austria) A Peya	6	7^{7}
(United States) E Butorac (Brazil) B Soares	5	6	[9]
(United States) J Blake (United States) B Reynolds	7	3	[11]
(Belgium) C Rochus (France) F Serra	3	1
4	(United States) M Fish (The Bahamas) M Knowles	6	6
(Latvia) E Gulbis (Russia) I Kunitsyn	w/o
ALT	(India) R Bopanna (Belgium) S Darcis
(United States) R Kendrick (Belarus) M Mirnyi	3	2
2	(United Kingdom) J Murray (Serbia) D Vemić	6	6

Quarterfinals
(United States) J Cerretani (Australia) A Fisher	1	6^{5}
(United States) T Parrott (Slovakia) F Polášek	6	7^{7}
3	(Australia) P Hanley (Australia) J Kerr	4	4
(Germany) P Petzschner (Austria) A Peya	6	6
(United States) J Blake (United States) B Reynolds	4	3
4	(United States) M Fish (The Bahamas) M Knowles	6	6
(Latvia) E Gulbis (Russia) I Kunitsyn	6	6^{3}	[10]
2	(United Kingdom) J Murray (Serbia) D Vemić	3	7^{7}	[6]

Semifinals
(United States) T Parrott (Slovakia) F Polášek	6	6
(Germany) P Petzschner (Austria) A Peya	4	1
4	(United States) M Fish (The Bahamas) M Knowles	6	7^{8}
(Latvia) E Gulbis (Russia) I Kunitsyn	1	6^{6}

Final
(United States) T Parrott (Slovakia) F Polášek	6^{7}	1
4	(United States) M Fish (The Bahamas) M Knowles	7^{9}	6
