= 2004 Uncle Tobys Hardcourts =

Coordinates: 28.0167°S 153.4°E

- Date: 4–10 January 2004
- Edition: 8th
- Category: Tier III
- Draw: 30S / 16D
- Prize money: US$170,000
- Surface: Hard / outdoor
- Location: Gold Coast, Queensland, Australia

Champions

Singles
- (Japan) Ai Sugiyama

Doubles
- (Russia) Svetlana Kuznetsova (Russia) Elena Likhovtseva
← 2003 ·	Australian Hard Court Championships	· 2005 →

The 2004 Uncle Tobys Hardcourts was a women's tennis tournament played on outdoor hard courts. It was the 8th edition of the event then known as the Uncle Tobys Hardcourts, and was a Tier III event on the 2004 WTA Tour. It took place in Gold Coast, Queensland, Australia, from 4 January through 10 January 2004. First-seeded Ai Sugiyama won the singles title and earned $27,000 first-prize money.

== Finals ==
=== Singles ===
(Japan) Ai Sugiyama defeated (Russia) Nadia Petrova, 1–6, 6–1, 6–4

=== Doubles ===
(Russia) Svetlana Kuznetsova / (Russia) Elena Likhovtseva defeated (South Africa) Liezel Huber / (Bulgaria) Magdalena Maleeva, 6–3, 6–4
