= 2004 Uncle Tobys Hardcourts – Singles =

Singles
- 2004 Uncle Tobys Hardcourts

Final
- Champion: (Japan) Ai Sugiyama
- Runner-up: (Russia) Nadia Petrova
- Score: 1–6, 6–1, 6–4

Details
- Draw: 30
- Seeds: 8

Events
| Singles | Doubles |
| ← 2003 · | Australian Hard Court Championships | · 2005 → |

Nathalie Dechy was the defending champion, but lost in semifinals to Nadia Petrova.

Ai Sugiyama won the title by defeating Nadia Petrova 1–6, 6–1, 6–4 in the final.

== Seeds ==
The first two seeds received a bye into the second round.

1. (Japan) Ai Sugiyama (champion)
2. (Russia) Nadia Petrova (final)
3. (Russia) Vera Zvonareva (second round)
4. (United States) Meghann Shaughnessy (first round)
5. (Spain) Conchita Martínez (second round)
6. (Italy) Francesca Schiavone (first round)
7. (Spain) Magüi Serna (quarterfinals)
8. (Switzerland) Patty Schnyder (second round, withdrew due to an injury)

== Draw ==
=== Key ===
- Q = Qualifier
- WC = Wild card
- LL = Lucky loser
- Alt = Alternate
- SE = Special exempt
- PR = Protected ranking
- ITF = ITF entry
- JE = Junior exempt
- w/o = Walkover
- r = Retired
- d = Defaulted
- SR = Special ranking

=== Finals ===
Semifinals
1 | (Japan) Ai Sugiyama | 7 | 3 | 6
WC | (Australia) Samantha Stosur | 5 | 6 | 3
(France) Nathalie Dechy | 6^{1} | 4
2 | (Russia) Nadia Petrova | 7^{7} | 6

Final
1 | (Japan) Ai Sugiyama | 1 | 6 | 6
2 | (Russia) Nadia Petrova | 6 | 1 | 4

=== Top half ===
First round
(France) É Loit | 6 | 6
(Thailand) T Tanasugarn | 4 | 3
(Czech Republic) D Chládková | 1 | 1
(Bulgaria) M Maleeva | 6 | 6
(Spain) M Sánchez Lorenzo | 3 | 6 | 6
6 | (Italy) F Schiavone | 6 | 2 | 3
4 | (United States) M Shaughnessy | 6^{3} | 3
WC | (Australia) S Stosur | 7^{7} | 6
(Croatia) K Šprem | 7 | 6
(Italy) S Farina Elia | 5 | 2
Q | (Hungary) A Kapros | 4 | 6 | 6
(Slovenia) T Pisnik | 6 | 2 | 0
WC | (Australia) C Dellacqua | 2 | 4
7 | (Spain) M Serna | 6 | 6

Second round
1 | (Japan) A Sugiyama | 6 | 6
(France) É Loit | 3 | 2
(Bulgaria) M Maleeva | 7 | 6
(Spain) M Sánchez Lorenzo | 5 | 4
WC | (Australia) S Stosur | 7 | 6
(Croatia) K Šprem | 5 | 4
Q | (Hungary) A Kapros | 6 | 0 | 4
7 | (Spain) M Serna | 2 | 6 | 6

Quarterfinals
1 | (Japan) A Sugiyama | 4 | 7^{7} | 6
(Bulgaria) M Maleeva | 6 | 6^{4} | 3
WC | (Australia) S Stosur | 7^{7} | 7
7 | (Spain) M Serna | 6^{1} | 5

Semifinals
1 | (Japan) A Sugiyama | 7 | 3 | 6
WC | (Australia) S Stosur | 5 | 6 | 3

=== Bottom half ===
First round
8 | (Switzerland) P Schnyder | 6 | 6
(Serbia and Montenegro) J Janković | 4 | 0
(Slovenia) K Srebotnik | 4 | 1
(France) N Dechy | 6 | 6
(Russia) S Kuznetsova | 6 | 6
(Russia) E Likhovtseva | 4 | 1
Q | (Austria) B Schett | 1 | 4
3 | (Russia) V Zvonareva | 6 | 6
5 | (Spain) C Martínez | 6 | 6
Q | (China) T Sun | 3 | 2
Q | (France) S Cohen-Aloro | 6 | 4 | 2
(Russia) D Safina | 3 | 6 | 6
(Russia) L Krasnoroutskaya | 7^{8} | 1 | 5
(Australia) N Pratt | 6^{6} | 6 | 7

Second round
8 | (Switzerland) P Schnyder
(France) N Dechy | w/o
(Russia) S Kuznetsova | 1 | 6 | 6
3 | (Russia) V Zvonareva | 6 | 3 | 2
5 | (Spain) C Martínez | 3 | 4
(Russia) D Safina | 6 | 6
(Australia) N Pratt | 2 | 2
2 | (Russia) N Petrova | 6 | 6

Quarterfinals
(France) N Dechy | 7^{7} | 6
(Russia) S Kuznetsova | 6^{5} | 4
(Russia) D Safina | 1 | 4
2 | (Russia) N Petrova | 6 | 6

Semifinals
(France) N Dechy | 6^{1} | 4
2 | (Russia) N Petrova | 7^{7} | 6
