= 2005 Uncle Tobys Hardcourts – Doubles =

Doubles
- 2005 Uncle Tobys Hardcourts

Final
- Champions: (Russia) Elena Likhovtseva (Bulgaria) Magdalena Maleeva
- Runners-up: (Italy) Maria Elena Camerin (Italy) Silvia Farina Elia
- Score: 6–3, 5–7, 6–1

Events
| Singles | Doubles |
| ← 2004 · | Australian Hard Court Championships | · 2006 → |

Svetlana Kuznetsova and Elena Likhovtseva were the defending champions, but Kuznetsova did not compete this year. Likhovtseva teamed up with Magdalena Maleeva and successfully defended her title, by defeating Maria Elena Camerin and Silvia Farina Elia 6–3, 5–7, 6–1 in the final.

== Seeds ==
1. (Austria) Barbara Schett / (Switzerland) Patty Schnyder (quarterfinals)
2. (Russia) Elena Likhovtseva / (Bulgaria) Magdalena Maleeva (champions)
3. (China) Li Ting / (China) Sun Tiantian (first round)
4. (China) Yan Zi / (China) Zheng Jie (semifinals)

== Draw ==
=== Key ===
- Q = Qualifier
- WC = Wild card
- LL = Lucky loser
- Alt = Alternate
- SE = Special exempt
- PR = Protected ranking
- ITF = ITF entry
- JE = Junior exempt
- w/o = Walkover
- r = Retired
- d = Defaulted
- SR = Special ranking

=== Draw ===
First round
1 | (Austria) B Schett (Switzerland) P Schnyder | 7^{7} | 6
(Italy) T Garbin (Germany) M Weingärtner | 6^{1} | 2
(Czech Republic) I Benešová (Italy) A Serra Zanetti | 3 | 6 | 6^{3}
(Italy) ME Camerin (Italy) S Farina Elia | 6 | 3 | 7^{7}
3 | (China) T Li (China) T Sun | 5 | 7^{7} | 6^{5}
(Ukraine) Y Beygelzimer (France) É Loit | 7 | 6^{2} | 7^{7}
Q | (Ukraine) Y Fedak (Germany) J Schruff | 3 | 2
(France) S Cohen-Aloro (Tunisia) S Sfar | 6 | 6
(Australia) B Stewart (Australia) S Stosur | 6 | 6
WC | (Australia) S Ferguson (Australia) J Hewitt | 2 | 2
(France) T Golovin (Russia) D Safina | 4 | 6^{3}
4 | (China) Z Yan (China) J Zheng | 6 | 7^{7}
(Australia) C Dellacqua (Australia) N Sewell | 6^{0} | 3
(France) N Dechy (United States) M Navratilova | 7^{7} | 6
(Belgium) E Callens (Australia) L McShea | 2 | 4
2 | (Russia) E Likhovtseva (Bulgaria) M Maleeva | 6 | 6

Quarterfinals
1 | (Austria) B Schett (Switzerland) P Schnyder | 4 | 4
(Italy) ME Camerin (Italy) S Farina Elia | 6 | 6
(Ukraine) Y Beygelzimer (France) É Loit | 6 | 4 | 2
(France) S Cohen-Aloro (Tunisia) S Sfar | 4 | 6 | 6
(Australia) B Stewart (Australia) S Stosur | 7 | 5 | 4
4 | (China) Z Yan (China) J Zheng | 5 | 7 | 6
(France) N Dechy (United States) M Navratilova | 2 | 4
2 | (Russia) E Likhovtseva (Bulgaria) M Maleeva | 6 | 6

Semifinals
(Italy) ME Camerin (Italy) S Farina Elia | 2 | 6 | 7
(France) S Cohen-Aloro (Tunisia) S Sfar | 6 | 3 | 5
4 | (China) Z Yan (China) J Zheng | 4 | 3
2 | (Russia) E Likhovtseva (Bulgaria) M Maleeva | 6 | 6

Final
(Italy) ME Camerin (Italy) S Farina Elia | 3 | 7 | 1
2 | (Russia) E Likhovtseva (Bulgaria) M Maleeva | 6 | 5 | 6
