= 2008 Mondial Australian Women's Hardcourts – Doubles =

Coordinates: 28.0167°S 153.4°E

Doubles
- 2008 Mondial Australian Women's Hardcourts

Final
- Champions: (Russia) Dinara Safina (Hungary) Ágnes Szávay
- Runners-up: (China) Yan Zi (China) Zheng Jie
- Score: 6–1, 6–2

Events
Singles	Doubles
← 2007 ·	Australian Hard Court Championships

Dinara Safina and Katarina Srebotnik were the defending champions, but Srebotnik chose not to participate. Safina partnered with Ágnes Szávay and won the title, defeating Yan Zi and Zheng Jie in the final 6–1, 6–2.

This was the final edition of the tournament. The following year, the Brisbane International was held, merging the men's and women's tournaments together.

== Seeds ==
1. (Zimbabwe) Cara Black / (United States) Liezel Huber (semifinals)
2. (China) Yan Zi / (China) Zheng Jie (final)
3. (Russia) Dinara Safina / (Hungary) Ágnes Szávay (champions)
4. (Italy) Tathiana Garbin / (United States) Meghann Shaughnessy (withdrew due to a knee injury for Shaughnessy)

== Draw ==
=== Key ===
- Q = Qualifier
- WC = Wild card
- LL = Lucky loser
- Alt = Alternate
- SE = Special exempt
- PR = Protected ranking
- ITF = ITF entry
- JE = Junior exempt
- w/o = Walkover
- r = Retired
- d = Defaulted
- SR = Special ranking

=== Draw ===
First round
1	(Zimbabwe) C Black (United States) L Huber	6	6
WC	(Switzerland) P Schnyder (Czech Republic) N Vaidišová	2	3
(Belarus) D Kustova (Belarus) T Poutchek	2	1
(Italy) F Pennetta (Italy) F Schiavone	6	6
3	(Russia) D Safina (Hungary) A Szávay	6	6
(Ukraine) Y Fedak (Japan) A Nakamura	3	2
WC	(Australia) C Dellacqua (Australia) T Musgrave	3	5
(Russia) N Petrova (Russia) E Vesnina	6	7
(France) N Dechy (France) S Foretz	6	3	[10]
(China) C Ji (China) S Sun	2	6	[4]
(Czech Republic) I Benešová (Russia) G Voskoboeva	6	4	[10]
ALT	(Russia) A Kleybanova (Russia) Y Shvedova	3	6	[1]
(Russia) A Kudryavtseva (Ukraine) T Perebiynis	2	2
(Belarus) V Azarenka (Israel) S Pe'er	6	6
(Australia) J Gajdošová (Australia) B Stewart	3	4
2	(China) Z Yan (China) J Zheng	6	6

Quarterfinals
1	(Zimbabwe) C Black (United States) L Huber	6^{7}	6	[10]
(Italy) F Pennetta (Italy) F Schiavone	7	4	[7]
3	(Russia) D Safina (Hungary) A Szávay	6	6
(Russia) N Petrova (Russia) E Vesnina	3	4
(France) N Dechy (France) S Foretz
(Czech Republic) I Benešová (Russia) G Voskoboeva	w/o
(Belarus) V Azarenka (Israel) S Pe'er	6	3	[10]
2	(China) Z Yan (China) J Zheng	4	6	[12]

Semifinals
1	(Zimbabwe) C Black (United States) L Huber	3	1
3	(Russia) D Safina (Hungary) A Szávay	6	6
(Czech Republic) I Benešová (Russia) G Voskoboeva	3	5
2	(China) Z Yan (China) J Zheng	6	7

Final
3	(Russia) D Safina (Hungary) A Szávay	6	6
2	(China) Z Yan (China) J Zheng	1	2
