= 2007 Mondial Australian Women's Hardcourts – Doubles =

Coordinates: 28.0167°S 153.4°E

Doubles
- 2007 Mondial Australian Women's Hardcourts

Final
- Champion: (Russia) Dinara Safina (Slovenia) Katarina Srebotnik
- Runner-up: (Czech Republic) Iveta Benešová (Russia) Galina Voskoboeva
- Score: 6-3, 6-4

Events
Singles	Doubles
← 2006 ·	Australian Hard Court Championships	· 2008 →

Dinara Safina and Meghann Shaughnessy were the defending champions, but did not compete together this year.

Shaughnessy partnered with Anna-Lena Grönefeld, and lost to Li Na and Peng Shuai in the first round. Safina partnered with Katarina Srebotnik, and won in the final 6–3, 6–4, against Iveta Benešová and Galina Voskoboeva.

== Seeds ==
1. (Zimbabwe) Cara Black
  (South Africa) Liezel Huber (semifinals)
2. (Russia) Dinara Safina
  (Slovenia) Katarina Srebotnik (champions)
3. (Germany) Anna-Lena Grönefeld
  (United States) Meghann Shaughnessy (first round)
4. (Russia) Maria Kirilenko
  (Israel) Shahar Pe'er (quarterfinals)

== Draw ==
=== Key ===
- Q = Qualifier
- WC = Wild card
- LL = Lucky loser
- Alt = Alternate
- SE = Special exempt
- PR = Protected ranking
- ITF = ITF entry
- JE = Junior exempt
- w/o = Walkover
- r = Retired
- d = Defaulted
- SR = Special ranking

=== Draw ===
First round
1	(Zimbabwe) C Black (South Africa) L Huber	6	6
(Poland) K Jans (Poland) A Rosolska	3	2
(Italy) T Garbin (Italy) R Vinci	1	3
(Russia) E Likhovtseva (Russia) E Vesnina	6	6
3	(Germany) AL Grönefeld (United States) M Shaughnessy	4	7	1
WC	(China) N Li (China) S Peng	6	5	6
WC	(Australia) C Dellacqua (Australia) S Ferguson	2	3
(Czech Republic) I Benešová (Russia) G Voskoboeva	6	6
(Italy) ME Camerin (Italy) F Pennetta	3	4
(United States) V King (Australia) N Pratt	6	6
(Slovakia) J Gajdošová (Australia) B Stewart	5	3
4	(Russia) M Kirilenko (Israel) S Pe'er	7	6
(Russia) A Rodionova (Romania) A Vanc	7^{7}	1	4
(Ukraine) Y Fedak (Ukraine) T Perebiynis	6^{0}	6	6
(South Africa) N Grandin (Belarus) T Poutchek	3	2
2	(Russia) D Safina (Slovenia) K Srebotnik	6	6

Quarterfinals
1	(Zimbabwe) C Black (South Africa) L Huber	6	6
(Russia) E Likhovtseva (Russia) E Vesnina	3	4
WC	(China) N Li (China) S Peng	7	2	0
(Czech Republic) I Benešová (Russia) G Voskoboeva	5	6	6
(United States) V King (Australia) N Pratt	6	6
4	(Russia) M Kirilenko (Israel) S Pe'er	2	3
(Ukraine) Y Fedak (Ukraine) T Perebiynis	1	2
2	(Russia) D Safina (Slovenia) K Srebotnik	6	6

Semifinals
1	(Zimbabwe) C Black (South Africa) L Huber	4	0
(Czech Republic) I Benešová (Russia) G Voskoboeva	6	6
(United States) V King (Australia) N Pratt	1	3
2	(Russia) D Safina (Slovenia) K Srebotnik	6	6

Final
(Czech Republic) I Benešová (Russia) G Voskoboeva	3	4
2	(Russia) D Safina (Slovenia) K Srebotnik	6	6
