= 2007 Cellular South Cup – Doubles =

Doubles
- 2007 Regions Morgan Keegan Championships and the Cellular South Cup

Final
- Champions: (Australia) Nicole Pratt (Australia) Bryanne Stewart
- Runners-up: (Slovakia) Jarmila Gajdošová (Japan) Akiko Morigami
- Score: 7-5, 4-6, [10-5]

Details
- Draw: 16
- Seeds: 4

Events
Singles	men	women
Doubles	men	women
← 2006 ·	Regions Morgan Keegan Championships	· 2008 →
← 2006 ·	Cellular South Cup	· 2008 →

Lisa Raymond and Samantha Stosur were the defending champions, but withdrew due to a viral illness for Stosur, before their quarterfinal against Jarmila Gajdošová and Akiko Morigami.

Nicole Pratt and Bryanne Stewart won in the final 7–5, 4–6, 10–5, against Jarmila Gajdošová and Akiko Morigami.

== Seeds ==
1. (United States) Lisa Raymond / (Australia) Samantha Stosur (quarterfinals, withdrew due to a viral illness for Stosur)
2. (United States) Vania King / (Israel) Shahar Pe'er (first round)
3. (United States) Bethanie Mattek / (United States) Meilen Tu (semifinals)
4. (Australia) Nicole Pratt / (Australia) Bryanne Stewart (champions)

== Draw ==
=== Key ===
- Q = Qualifier
- WC = Wild card
- LL = Lucky loser
- Alt = Alternate
- SE = Special exempt
- PR = Protected ranking
- ITF = ITF entry
- JE = Junior exempt
- w/o = Walkover
- r = Retired
- d = Defaulted
- SR = Special ranking

=== Draw ===
First round
1	(United States) L Raymond (Australia) S Stosur	6	6
(Czech Republic) E Birnerová (Finland) E Laine	3	4
(Czech Republic) G Navrátilová (Czech Republic) M Paštiková	7^{7}	1	[7]
(Slovakia) J Gajdošová (Japan) A Morigami	6^{3}	6	[10]
3	(United States) B Mattek (United States) M Tu	6	3	[10]
(France) S Foretz (France) C Pin	3	6	[1]
WC	(United States) L Albanese (Denmark) C Wozniacki	6	6
(South Africa) N Grandin (South Africa) C Scheepers	2	3
(United States) J Craybas (Russia) A Jidkova	1^{r}
(Latvia) L Dekmeijere (Uzbekistan) V Lepchenko	4
(Germany) A Bachmann (Ukraine) T Luzhanska	3	4
4	(Australia) N Pratt (Australia) B Stewart	6	6
(United States) C Fusano (United States) A Tsoubanos	3	2
(United States) L Granville (United States) C Gullickson	6	6
(Czech Republic) L Hradecká (Czech Republic) R Voráčová	6	4	[10]
2	(United States) V King (Israel) S Pe'er	2	6	[8]

Quarterfinals
1	(United States) L Raymond (Australia) S Stosur
(Slovakia) J Gajdošová (Japan) A Morigami	w/o
3	(United States) B Mattek (United States) M Tu	7^{7}	6
WC	(United States) L Albanese (Denmark) C Wozniacki	6^{4}	3
(Latvia) L Dekmeijere (Uzbekistan) V Lepchenko	6^{5}	1
4	(Australia) N Pratt (Australia) B Stewart	7^{7}	6
(United States) L Granville (United States) C Gullickson	5	4
(Czech Republic) L Hradecká (Czech Republic) R Voráčová	7	6

Semifinals
(Slovakia) J Gajdošová (Japan) A Morigami	2	7	[10]
3	(United States) B Mattek (United States) M Tu	6	5	[8]
4	(Australia) N Pratt (Australia) B Stewart	6	6
(Czech Republic) L Hradecká (Czech Republic) R Voráčová	4	3

Final
(Slovakia) J Gajdošová (Japan) A Morigami	5	6	[5]
4	(Australia) N Pratt (Australia) B Stewart	7	4	[10]
