= 2005 Bausch & Lomb Championships =

- Date: 4 – 10 April
- Edition: 26th
- Category: WTA Tier II
- Prize money: US$585,000
- Surface: Clay / Outdoor
- Location: Amelia Island, Florida, United States
- Venue: Amelia Island Plantation

Champions

Singles
- (United States) Lindsay Davenport

Doubles
- (Australia) Bryanne Stewart / (Australia) Samantha Stosur
- Amelia Island Championships

The 2005 Bausch & Lomb Championships was a tennis tournament played on outdoor clay courts. It was the 26th edition of the Amelia Island Championships, and was part of the WTA Tier II series of the 2005 WTA Tour. It took place at the Amelia Island Plantation in Amelia Island, Florida, from April 4 through April 10, 2005.

== Points and prize money ==
=== Point distribution ===
Event	W	F	SF	QF	Round of 16	Round of 32	Round of 64	Q	Q2	Q1
Singles	195	137	88	49	25	14	1	6.75	4	1
Doubles	195	137	88	49	1	—N/a	—N/a	11.75	—N/a	—N/a

=== Prize money ===
Event	W	F	SF	QF	Round of 16	Round of 32	Round of 64	Q2	Q1
Singles	$93,000	$47,500	$24,300	$12,450	$6,380	$3,270	$1,675	$860	$440
Doubles *	$29,000	$14,920	$7,650	$3,930	$2,010	—N/a	—N/a	—N/a	—N/a

_{* per team}

== Singles main draw entrants ==
=== Seeds ===
Country	Player	Rank^{1}	Seed
USA	Lindsay Davenport	1	1
USA	Serena Williams	4	2
RUS	Anastasia Myskina	6	3
AUS	Alicia Molik	8	4
USA	Venus Williams	9	5
RUS	Vera Zvonareva	11	6
RUS	Nadia Petrova	12	7
SUI	Patty Schnyder	13	8
RUS	Elena Likhovtseva	17	9
CRO	Karolina Šprem	18	10
SCG	Jelena Janković	20	11
ITA	Silvia Farina Elia	22	12
JPN	Ai Sugiyama	24	13
FRA	Mary Pierce	25	14
JPN	Shinobu Asagoe	26	15
USA	Amy Frazier	27	16

^{1} Rankings as of 21 March 2005.

=== Other entrants ===
The following players received wildcards into the singles main draw:

- (Czech Republic) Dája Bedáňová
- (Greece) Eleni Daniilidou
- (Israel) Shahar Pe'er
- (Australia) Nicole Pratt

The following players received entry from the qualifying draw:

- (Ukraine) Kateryna Bondarenko
- (Puerto Rico) Kristina Brandi
- (Colombia) Catalina Castaño
- (Poland) Marta Domachowska
- (United States) Marissa Irvin
- (Japan) Akiko Morigami
- (Israel) Tzipora Obziler
- (Czech Republic) Květa Peschke

=== Retirements ===
- (France) Émilie Loit (left wrist tendinitis)
- (United States) Meghann Shaughnessy (lower back injury)
- (United States) Serena Williams (left ankle sprain)

== Doubles main draw entrants ==
=== Seeds ===
Country	Player	Country	Player	Rank^{1}	Seed
~~RUS~~	~~Nadia Petrova~~	~~USA~~	~~Meghann Shaughnessy~~	Withdrew	~~1~~
USA	Lisa Raymond	AUS	Rennae Stubbs	17	2
RUS	Elena Likhovtseva	JPN	Ai Sugiyama	18	3
ESP	Conchita Martínez	ESP	Virginia Ruano Pascual	19	4
AUS	Alicia Molik	USA	Martina Navratilova	21	5

^{1} Rankings as of 21 March 2005.

=== Other entrants ===
The following pair received wildcards into the doubles main draw:

- (Greece) Eleni Daniilidou / (United States) Carly Gullickson
- (United States) Corina Morariu / (France) Mary Pierce

The following pair received entry from the qualifying draw:

- (Spain) Lourdes Domínguez Lino / (Russia) Evgenia Linetskaya

The following pair received entry as lucky losers:

- (United States) Jill Craybas / (United States) Jennifer Russell
- (Chinese Taipei) Janet Lee / (China) Peng Shuai

=== Withdrawals ===
Before the tournament

- (France) Émilie Loit (left wrist tendinitis) → replaced by Craybas/Russell
- (United States) Meghann Shaughnessy (lower back injury) → replaced by Lee/Peng

== Finals ==
=== Singles ===
- (United States) Lindsay Davenport defeated (Italy) Silvia Farina Elia, 7–5, 7–5

It was the 2nd title for Davenport in the season and the 47th title in her singles career.

=== Doubles ===
- (Australia) Bryanne Stewart / (Australia) Samantha Stosur defeated (Czech Republic) Květa Peschke / (Switzerland) Patty Schnyder, 6–4, 6–2

It was the 2nd title for both Stewart and Stosur in their respective doubles careers.
