= 2008 Regions Morgan Keegan Championships – Singles =

Singles
- 2008 Regions Morgan Keegan Championships and the Cellular South Cup

Final
- Champion: (Belgium) Steve Darcis
- Runner-up: (Sweden) Robin Söderling
- Score: 6–3, 7–6^{(7–5)}

Details
- Draw: 32 (4Q / 3WC)
- Seeds: 8

Events
Singles	men	women
Doubles	men	women
← 2007 ·	Regions Morgan Keegan Championships	· 2009 →
← 2007 ·	Cellular South Cup	· 2009 →

Tommy Haas was the defending champion, but lost in the second round to Benjamin Becker.

Steve Darcis won in the final 6–3, 7–6^{(7–5)}, against Robin Söderling.

== Seeds ==
1. (United States) Andy Roddick (quarterfinals)
2. (United States) James Blake (withdrew due to a knee injury)
3. (Germany) Tommy Haas (second round)
4. (Czech Republic) Radek Štěpánek (semifinals)
5. (United States) Sam Querrey (second round)
6. (Sweden) Thomas Johansson (second round)
7. (Austria) Jürgen Melzer (second round)
8. (Sweden) Robin Söderling (final)

== Draw ==
Key

- Q = Qualifier
- WC = Wild card
- LL = Lucky loser
- Alt = Alternate
- ITF = ITF entry
- PR = Protected ranking
- SR = Special ranking
- SE = Special exempt
- JE = Junior exempt
- JR = Junior Accelerator Programme entrant
- CO = College Accelerator Programme entrant
- NG = Next Gen Accelerator Program entrant
- w/o = Walkover
- r = Retired
- d = Defaulted

=== Finals ===
Semifinals
8	(Sweden) Robin Söderling	7^{7}	6
4	(Czech Republic) Radek Štěpánek	6^{2}	3
(Belgium) Steve Darcis	4	6	6
(Sweden) Jonas Björkman	6	1	4

Final
8	(Sweden) Robin Söderling	3	6^{5}
(Belgium) Steve Darcis	6	7^{7}

=== Top half ===
First round
1/WC	(United States) A Roddick	6	7^{7}
Q	(Luxembourg) G Müller	4	6^{4}
Q	(United States) B Reynolds	7^{7}	4	2
(United States) M Fish	6^{3}	6	6
(Chinese Taipei) Y-h Lu	3	1^{r}
(Romania) V Hănescu	6	2
Q	(Canada) F Niemeyer	2	1
8	(Sweden) R Söderling	6	6
4	(Czech Republic) R Štěpánek	6	6
Q	(United States) J Levine	1	4
(France) F Serra	6	6
(Brazil) M Daniel	1	2
(Australia) C Guccione	7^{8}	7^{7}
(United States) R Kendrick	6^{6}	6^{5}
WC	(Russia) M Safin	6^{5}	6^{2}
6	(Sweden) T Johansson	7^{7}	7^{7}

Second round
1/WC	(United States) A Roddick	6	6
(United States) M Fish	4	2
(Romania) V Hănescu	2	1
8	(Sweden) R Söderling	6	6
4	(Czech Republic) R Štěpánek	7^{8}	2	7
(France) F Serra	6^{6}	6	5
(Australia) C Guccione	6	6
6	(Sweden) T Johansson	3	4

Quarterfinals
1/WC	(United States) A Roddick	6^{6}	3
8	(Sweden) R Söderling	7^{8}	6
4	(Czech Republic) R Štěpánek	7^{7}	6
(Australia) C Guccione	6^{4}	1

Semifinals
8	(Sweden) R Söderling	7^{7}	6
4	(Czech Republic) R Štěpánek	6^{2}	3

=== Bottom half ===
First round
7	(Austria) J Melzer	6^{8}	6	7^{7}
WC	(United States) J Isner	7^{10}	3	6^{4}
(Belgium) S Darcis	7	4	7^{7}
(United States) V Spadea	5	6	6^{4}
(Belgium) K Vliegen	5	6^{1}
(Germany) B Becker	7	7^{7}
(Argentina) D Hartfield	3	2
3	(Germany) T Haas	6	6
5	(United States) S Querrey	3	6	7
(United States) M Russell	6	3	5
(Chile) P Capdeville	3	1
(Sweden) J Björkman	6	6
(Colombia) A Falla	6	6
(Israel) D Sela	4	2
(United States) D Young	6	6
LL	(United States) S Warburg	4	4

Second round
7	(Austria) J Melzer	3	6^{4}
(Belgium) S Darcis	6	7^{7}
(Germany) B Becker	3	6	7
3	(Germany) T Haas	6	2	5
5	(United States) S Querrey	4	6	6^{4}
(Sweden) J Björkman	6	4	7^{7}
(Colombia) A Falla	1	6	3
(United States) D Young	6	1	6

Quarterfinals
(Belgium) S Darcis	6	6
(Germany) B Becker	1	0
(Sweden) J Björkman	1	6	7^{8}
(United States) D Young	6	2	6^{6}

Semifinals
(Belgium) S Darcis	4	6	6
(Sweden) J Björkman	6	1	4
