= 2005 Uncle Tobys Hardcourts =

Coordinates: 28.0167°S 153.4°E

- Date: 2–8 January 2005
- Edition: 9th
- Category: Tier III
- Draw: 30S / 16D
- Prize money: US$170,000
- Surface: Hard / outdoor
- Location: Gold Coast, Queensland, Australia

Champions

Singles
- (Switzerland) Patty Schnyder

Doubles
- (Russia) Elena Likhovtseva / (Bulgaria) Magdalena Maleeva
← 2004 ·	Australian Hard Court Championships	· 2006 →

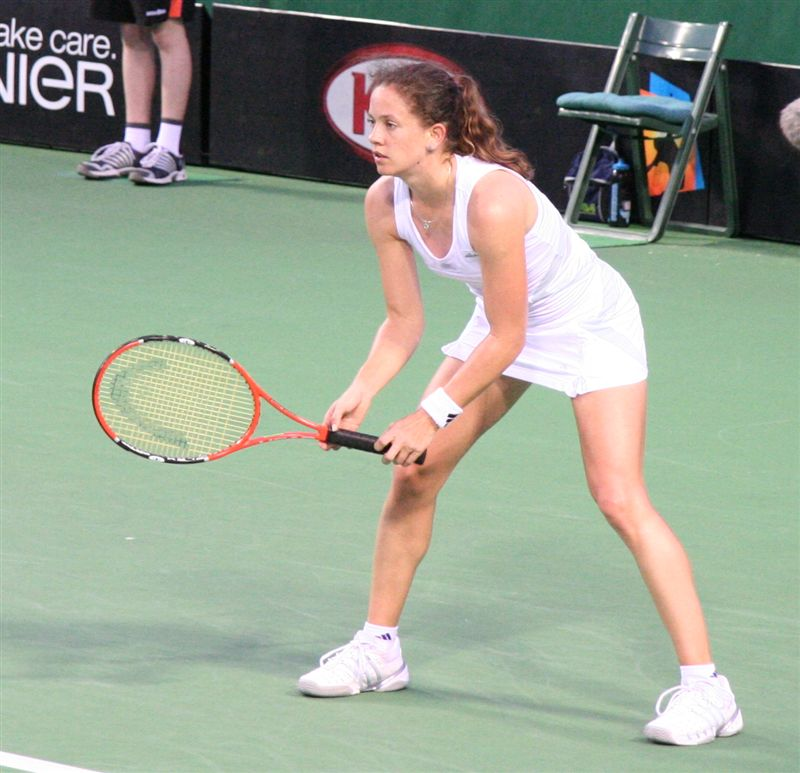
Patty Schnyder won the singles event

The 2005 Uncle Tobys Hardcourts was a women's tennis tournament played on outdoor hard courts. It was the ninth edition of the event then known as the Uncle Tobys Hardcourts, and was a Tier III event on the 2005 WTA Tour. It took place in Gold Coast, Queensland, Australia, from 2 January through 8 January 2005. Second-seeded Patty Schnyder won the singles title and earned $27,000 first-prize money.

== Finals ==
=== Singles ===
(Switzerland) Patty Schnyder defeated (Australia) Samantha Stosur, 1–6, 6–3, 7–5

- It was Schnyder's 1st singles title of the year and the 9th of her career.

=== Doubles ===
(Russia) Elena Likhovtseva / (Bulgaria) Magdalena Maleeva defeated (Italy) Maria Elena Camerin / (Italy) Silvia Farina Elia, 6–3, 5–7, 6–1
