= 2006 Mondial Australian Women's Hardcourts =

Coordinates: 28.0167°S 153.4°E

- Date: 1–7 January
- Edition: 10th
- Category: Tier III
- Draw: 32S / 16D
- Prize money: US$175,000
- Surface: Hard / outdoor
- Location: Gold Coast, Queensland, Australia

Champions

Singles
- (Czech Republic) Lucie Šafářová

Doubles
- (Russia) Dinara Safina (United States) Meghann Shaughnessy
← 2005 ·	Australian Hard Court Championships	· 2007 →

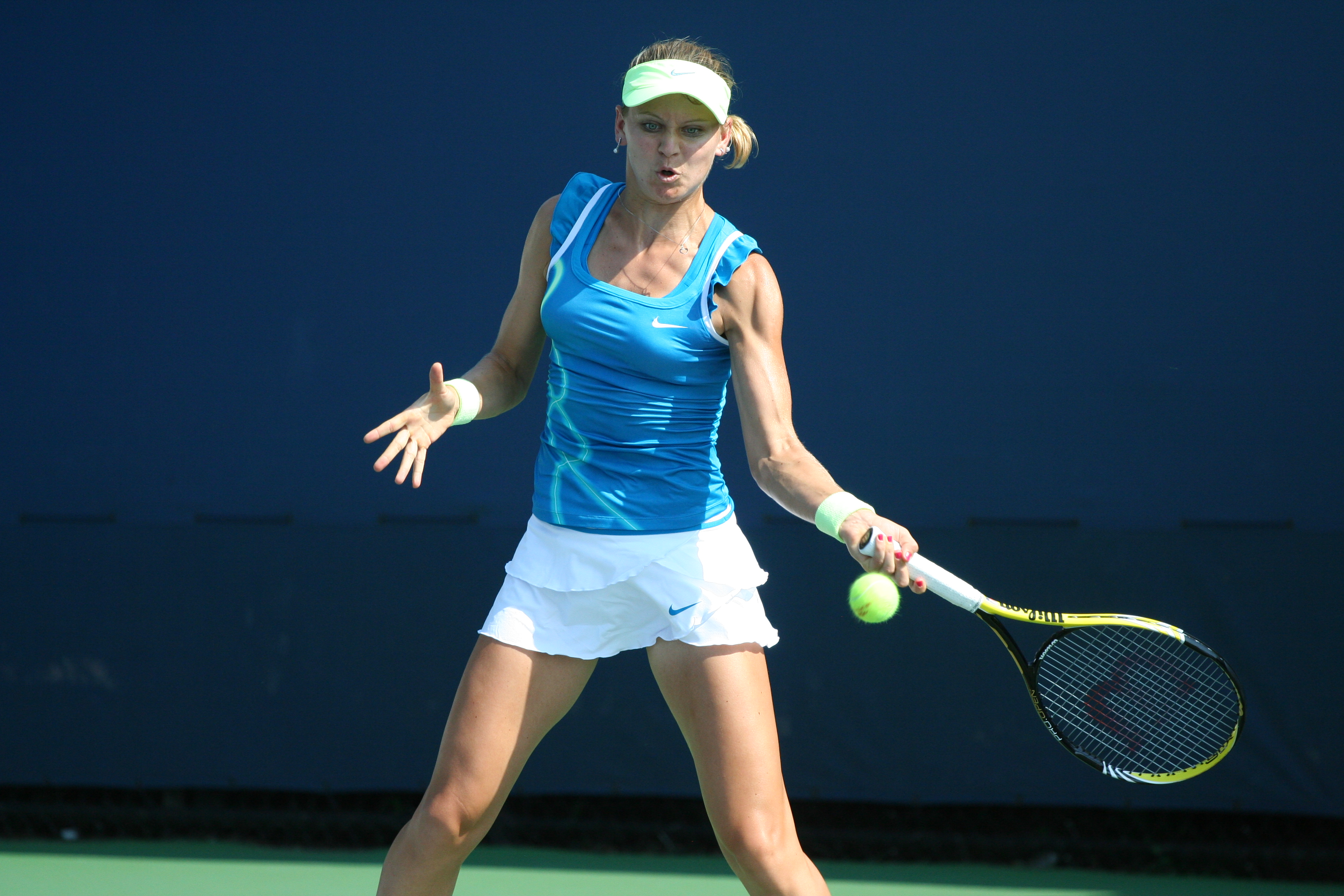
2006 Mondial Australian Women's Hardcourts

The 2006 Mondial Australian Women's Hardcourts was a women's tennis tournament played on outdoor hard courts. It was the 10th edition of the event then known as the Mondial Australian Women's Hardcourts, and was a Tier III event on the 2006 WTA Tour. It took place in Gold Coast, Queensland, Australia, from 1 January through 7 January 2006. Unseeded Lucie Šafářová won the singles title and earned $28,000 first-prize money.

== Finals ==
=== Singles ===
(Czech Republic) Lucie Šafářová defeated (Italy) Flavia Pennetta, 6–3, 6–4

=== Doubles ===
(Russia) Dinara Safina / (United States) Meghann Shaughnessy defeated (Zimbabwe) Cara Black / (Australia) Rennae Stubbs, 6–2, 6–3

== WTA entrants ==
=== Seeds ===
Country	Player	Rank	Seed
SUI	Patty Schnyder	7	1
ITA	Francesca Schiavone	15	2
RUS	Dinara Safina	20	3
ITA	Flavia Pennetta	22	4
FRA	Tatiana Golovin	24	5
JPN	Ai Sugiyama	26	6
CZE	Klára Koukalová	29	7
ESP	Anabel Medina Garrigues	32	8

- Rankings as of 19 December 2005.

=== Other entrants ===
The following players received wildcards into the singles main draw:

- (Australia) Sophie Ferguson
- (Australia) Nicole Pratt
- (Switzerland) Martina Hingis

The following players received entry from the qualifying draw:

- (United States) Angela Haynes
- (Slovakia) Jarmila Gajdošová
- (China) Sun Tiantian
- (China) Yuan Meng
