= 2008 Mondial Australian Women's Hardcourts =

Coordinates: 28.0167°S 153.4°E

- Date: 31 December – 5 January
- Edition: 12th
- Category: Tier III
- Draw: 32S / 16D
- Prize money: US$175,000
- Surface: Hard / outdoor
- Location: Gold Coast, Queensland, Australia

Champions

Singles
- (China) Li Na

Doubles
- (Russia) Dinara Safina / (Hungary) Ágnes Szávay
| ← 2007 · | Australian Hard Court Championships |

The 2008 Mondial Australian Women's Hardcourts was a women's tennis tournament played on outdoor hard courts. It was the 12th and final edition of the Mondial Australian Women's Hardcourts, which was renamed and relocated to Brisbane, and was part of the Tier III Series of the 2008 WTA Tour. It took place in Gold Coast, Queensland, Australia, from 31 December 2007 through 5 January 2008. Unseeded Li Na won the singles title and earned $28,000 first-prize money.

This was the last edition of the tournament in Gold Coast, Queensland. In 2009 the women's tournament was merged with the men's tournament and became the Brisbane International.

== Finals ==
=== Singles ===
(China) Li Na defeated (Belarus) Victoria Azarenka, 4–6, 6–3, 6–4

- It was Na Li's 1st title of the year, and her 2nd overall.

=== Doubles ===
(Russia) Dinara Safina / (Hungary) Ágnes Szávay defeated (China) Yan Zi / (China) Zheng Jie, 6–1, 6–2

== Points and prize money ==
=== Point distribution ===
| Event | W | F | SF | QF | Round of 16 | Round of 32 | Q | Q3 | Q2 | Q1 |
| Singles | 140 | 100 | 65 | 35 | 20 | 1 | 8 | 4 | 3 | 1 |
| Doubles | 140 | 100 | 65 | 35 | 1 | — | — | — | — | — |

=== Prize money ===
| Event | W | F | SF | QF | Round of 16 | Round of 32 | Q3 | Q2 | Q1 |
| Singles | $25,000 | $14,650 | $7,700 | $4,050 | $2,200 | $1,300 | $650 | $350 | $200 |
| Doubles^{*} | $8,250 | $4,350 | $2,350 | $1,250 | $650 | — | — | — | — |

^{*} per team
