= 2008 Mondial Australian Women's Hardcourts – Singles =

Coordinates: 28.0167°S 153.4°E

Singles
- 2008 Mondial Australian Women's Hardcourts

Final
- Champion: (China) Li Na
- Runner-up: (Belarus) Victoria Azarenka
- Score: 4–6, 6–3, 6–4

Details
- Draw: 32
- Seeds: 8

Events
Singles	Doubles
← 2007 ·	Australian Hard Court Championships

Dinara Safina was the defending champion, but lost in the quarterfinals to Shahar Pe'er.

Li Na won in the final 4–6, 6–3, 6–4, against Victoria Azarenka.

This was the final edition of the tournament. The Brisbane International was held the next year, merging the men's and women's tournaments in this city.

== Seeds ==
1. (Czech Republic) Nicole Vaidišová (quarterfinals)
2. (Russia) Nadia Petrova (first round)
3. (Russia) Dinara Safina (quarterfinals)
4. (Switzerland) Patty Schnyder (semifinals)
5. (Israel) Shahar Pe'er (semifinals)
6. (France) Amélie Mauresmo (quarterfinals)
7. (Austria) Sybille Bammer (first round)
8. (Hungary) Ágnes Szávay (first round)

== Draw ==
=== Key ===
- Q = Qualifier
- WC = Wild card
- LL = Lucky loser
- Alt = Alternate
- SE = Special exempt
- PR = Protected ranking
- ITF = ITF entry
- JE = Junior exempt
- w/o = Walkover
- r = Retired
- d = Defaulted
- SR = Special ranking

=== Finals ===
Semifinals
(China) Li Na	3	6	7
4	(Switzerland) Patty Schnyder	6	3	5
5	(Israel) Shahar Pe'er	4	2
(Belarus) Victoria Azarenka	6	6

Final
(China) Li Na	4	6	6
(Belarus) Victoria Azarenka	6	3	4

=== Top half ===
First round
1	(Czech Republic) N Vaidišová	5	7	6
WC	(Australia) C Dellacqua	7	5	0
(Japan) A Nakamura	5	3
(Germany) T Malek	7	6
WC	(Australia) M Adamczak	7	3	7
(Russia) E Vesnina	6^{4}	6	5
(China) N Li	6	4	6
7	(Austria) S Bammer	4	6	4
4	(Switzerland) P Schnyder	6	6
Q	(Russia) A Kleybanova	1	3
(United States) M Shaughnessy	6	1
(Italy) F Schiavone	0	0	r
(China) Z Yan	2	2
(France) N Dechy	6	6
Q	(Ukraine) O Savchuk	1	1
6	(France) A Mauresmo	6	6

Second round
1	(Czech Republic) N Vaidišová	6	6
(Germany) T Malek	4	2
WC	(Australia) M Adamczak	3	2
(China) N Li	6	6
4	(Switzerland) P Schnyder	2	6	6
(Italy) F Schiavone	6	4	2
(France) N Dechy	3	4
6	(France) A Mauresmo	6	6

Quarterfinals
1	(Czech Republic) N Vaidišová	3	3
(China) N Li	6	6
4	(Switzerland) P Schnyder	6	6
6	(France) A Mauresmo	4	4

Semifinals
(China) N Li	3	6	7
4	(Switzerland) P Schnyder	6	3	5

=== Bottom half ===
First round
5	(Israel) S Pe'er	3	6	6
(United States) J Ditty	6	0	2
(Spain) L Domínguez Lino	2	1
Q	(Germany) J Schruff	6	6
Q	(Switzerland) T Bacsinszky	4	1
(Italy) F Pennetta	6	6
WC	(Australia) J Gajdošová	6	1	2
3	(Russia) D Safina	4	6	6
8	(Hungary) Á Szávay	6	5	2
LL	(Ukraine) Y Fedak	3	7	6
(Belarus) V Azarenka	6	6
(Japan) A Sugiyama	2	3
(France) V Razzano	2	2
(Slovakia) D Cibulková	6	6
(Italy) T Garbin	5	7	6
2	(Russia) N Petrova	7	5	3

Second round
5	(Israel) S Pe'er	6	0
Q	(Germany) J Schruff	0	0	r
(Italy) F Pennetta	4	6	4
3	(Russia) D Safina	6	2	6
LL	(Ukraine) Y Fedak	4	2
(Belarus) V Azarenka	6	6
(Slovakia) D Cibulková	7	6
(Italy) T Garbin	5	1

Quarterfinals
5	(Israel) S Pe'er	4	6	7
3	(Russia) D Safina	6	1	6^{8}
(Belarus) V Azarenka	6	3	6
(Slovakia) D Cibulková	1	6	3

Semifinals
5	(Israel) S Pe'er	4	2
(Belarus) V Azarenka	6	6
