= 2005 Bausch & Lomb Championships – Doubles =

Doubles
- 2005 Bausch & Lomb Championships

Final
- Champions: (Australia) Bryanne Stewart (Australia) Samantha Stosur
- Runners-up: (Czech Republic) Květa Peschke (Switzerland) Patty Schnyder
- Score: 6–4, 6–2

Details
- Draw: 16 (1 Q / 2 WC )
- Seeds: 4

Events
Singles	Doubles
← 2004 ·	Amelia Island Championships	· 2006 →

Nadia Petrova and Meghann Shaughnessy were the defending champions, but were forced to withdraw as Shaughnessy suffered a lower back injury during her singles match against Peng Shuai.

Bryanne Stewart and Samantha Stosur won the title by defeating Květa Peschke and Patty Schnyder 6–4, 6–2 in the final.

== Seeds ==
1. (Russia) ~~Nadia Petrova~~ / (United States) ~~Meghann Shaughnessy~~ (withdrew due to a lower back injury on Shaughnessy)
2. (United States) Lisa Raymond / (Australia) Rennae Stubbs (quarterfinals)
3. (Russia) Elena Likhovtseva / (Japan) Ai Sugiyama (first round)
4. (Spain) Conchita Martínez / (Spain) Virginia Ruano Pascual (first round)
5. (Australia) Alicia Molik / (United States) Martina Navratilova (semifinals)

== Draw ==
=== Key ===
- Q = Qualifier
- WC = Wild card
- LL = Lucky loser
- Alt = Alternate
- SE = Special exempt
- PR = Protected ranking
- ITF = ITF entry
- JE = Junior exempt
- w/o = Walkover
- r = Retired
- d = Defaulted
- SR = Special ranking

=== Draw ===
First round
5	(Australia) A Molik (United States) M Navratilova	6	3	6
Q	(Spain) L Domínguez Lino (Russia) E Linetskaya	4	6	0
WC	(Greece) E Daniilidou (United States) C Gullickson	2	7^{7}	6
(Russia) A Myskina (Russia) V Zvonareva	6	6^{2}	4
3	(Russia) E Likhovtseva (Japan) A Sugiyama	6^{5}	6^{6}
(Czech Republic) K Peschke (Switzerland) P Schnyder	7^{7}	7^{8}
(South Africa) L Huber (United States) M Washington	6	5	4
LL	(Chinese Taipei) J Lee (China) S Peng	3	7	6
(Germany) A-L Grönefeld (Spain) A Medina Garrigues	6	6
LL	(United States) J Craybas (United States) J Russell	4	4
(Japan) S Asagoe (Slovenia) K Srebotnik	6	6
4	(Spain) C Martínez (Spain) V Ruano Pascual	2	3
(Australia) L McShea (Venezuela) M Vento-Kabchi	3	6^{3}
(Australia) B Stewart (Australia) S Stosur	6	7^{7}
WC	(United States) C Morariu (France) M Pierce	2	4
2	(United States) L Raymond (Australia) R Stubbs	6	6

Quarterfinals
5	(Australia) A Molik (United States) M Navratilova	3	7	6
WC	(Greece) E Daniilidou (United States) C Gullickson	6	5	2
(Czech Republic) K Peschke (Switzerland) P Schnyder	6	6
LL	(Chinese Taipei) J Lee (China) S Peng	3	4
(Germany) A-L Grönefeld (Spain) A Medina Garrigues	1	3
(Japan) S Asagoe (Slovenia) K Srebotnik	6	6
(Australia) B Stewart (Australia) S Stosur	2	7^{8}	7^{7}
2	(United States) L Raymond (Australia) R Stubbs	6	6^{6}	6^{2}

Semifinals
5	(Australia) A Molik (United States) M Navratilova	3	6	5
(Czech Republic) K Peschke (Switzerland) P Schnyder	6	3	7
(Japan) S Asagoe (Slovenia) K Srebotnik	2	6^{4}
(Australia) B Stewart (Australia) S Stosur	6	7^{7}

Final
(Czech Republic) K Peschke (Switzerland) P Schnyder	4	2
(Australia) B Stewart (Australia) S Stosur	6	6
