= 2005 Bausch & Lomb Championships – Singles =

Singles
- 2005 Bausch & Lomb Championships

Final
- Champion: (United States) Lindsay Davenport
- Runner-up: (Italy) Silvia Farina Elia
- Score: 7–5, 7–5

Details
- Draw: 56 (8 Q / 4 WC )
- Seeds: 16

Events
| Singles | Doubles |
- Amelia Island Championships

Lindsay Davenport was the defending champion and successfully retained her title by defeating Silvia Farina Elia 7–5, 7–5 in the final.

== Seeds ==
The top eight seeds received a bye into the second round.

1. (United States) Lindsay Davenport (champion)
2. (United States) Serena Williams (quarterfinals, retired due to a left ankle sprain)
3. (Russia) Anastasia Myskina (third round)
4. (Australia) Alicia Molik (second round)
5. (United States) Venus Williams (quarterfinals)
6. (Russia) Vera Zvonareva (quarterfinals)
7. (Russia) Nadia Petrova (semifinals)
8. (Switzerland) Patty Schnyder (third round)
9. (Russia) Elena Likhovtseva (third round)
10. (Croatia) Karolina Šprem (first round)
11. (Serbia and Montenegro) Jelena Janković (third round)
12. (Italy) Silvia Farina Elia (final)
13. (Japan) Ai Sugiyama (third round)
14. (France) Mary Pierce (third round)
15. (Japan) Shinobu Asagoe (quarterfinals)
16. (United States) Amy Frazier (second round)

== Draw ==
Key

- Q = Qualifier
- WC = Wild card
- LL = Lucky loser
- Alt = Alternate
- ITF = ITF entry
- PR = Protected ranking
- SR = Special ranking
- SE = Special exempt
- JE = Junior exempt
- JR = Junior Accelerator Programme entrant
- CO = College Accelerator Programme entrant
- NG = Next Gen Accelerator Program entrant
- w/o = Walkover
- r = Retired
- d = Defaulted

=== Finals ===
Quarterfinals
1 | (United States) Lindsay Davenport | 1 | 6 | 6
5 | (United States) Venus Williams | 6 | 3 | 4
15 | (Japan) Shinobu Asagoe | 0 | 6 | 2
7 | (Russia) Nadia Petrova | 6 | 0 | 6
6 | (Russia) Vera Zvonareva | 4 | 4
(France) Virginie Razzano | 6 | 6
12 | (Italy) Silvia Farina Elia | 5 | 7^{9} | 0
2 | (United States) Serena Williams | 7 | 6^{7} | 0^{r}

Semifinals
1 | (United States) Lindsay Davenport | 6 | 6
7 | (Russia) Nadia Petrova | 0 | 3
(France) Virginie Razzano | 1 | 3
12 | (Italy) Silvia Farina Elia | 6 | 6

Final
1 | (United States) Lindsay Davenport | 7 | 7
12 | (Italy) Silvia Farina Elia | 5 | 5

=== Top half ===
==== Section 1 ====
First round
Q | (Puerto Rico) K Brandi | 6 | 6
(Italy) ME Camerin | 1 | 0
Q | (Colombia) C Castaño | 4 | 6^{5}
Q | (Czech Republic) K Peschke | 6 | 7^{7}
(Russia) A Jidkova | 4 | 2
16 | (United States) A Frazier | 6 | 6
10 | (Croatia) K Šprem | 6 | 3 | 4
(Spain) V Ruano Pascual | 4 | 6 | 6
Q | (Poland) M Domachowska | 6 | 6
Q | (Japan) A Morigami | 3 | 4
(Slovakia) M Suchá | 6 | 6
(Venezuela) M Vento-Kabchi | 4 | 2

Second round
1 | (United States) L Davenport | 6 | 6
Q | (Puerto Rico) K Brandi | 4 | 3
Q | (Czech Republic) K Peschke | 6 | 6
16 | (United States) A Frazier | 4 | 4
(Spain) V Ruano Pascual | 3 | 6 | 4
Q | (Poland) M Domachowska | 6 | 3 | 6
(Slovakia) M Suchá | 0 | 1
5 | (United States) V Williams | 6 | 6

Third round
1 | (United States) L Davenport | 6 | 6
Q | (Czech Republic) K Peschke | 2 | 2
Q | (Poland) M Domachowska | 6 | 4 | 2
5 | (United States) V Williams | 3 | 6 | 6

Quarterfinals
1 | (United States) L Davenport | 1 | 6 | 6
5 | (United States) V Williams | 6 | 3 | 4

==== Section 2 ====
First round
WC | (Israel) S Pe'er | 6 | 6
(Australia) S Stosur | 1 | 3
(United States) L Raymond | 6 | 6
Q | (Israel) T Obziler | 2 | 0
(United States) M Washington | 5 | 6 | 4
15 | (Japan) S Asagoe | 7 | 4 | 6
11 | (Serbia and Montenegro) J Janković | 6 | 6
(Russia) V Dushevina | 2 | 2
(Spain) C Martínez | 7^{7} | 6
Q | (United States) M Irvin | 6^{4} | 4
(Germany) A-L Grönefeld | 3 | 3
(Bulgaria) M Maleeva | 6 | 6

Second round
3 | (Russia) A Myskina | 6 | 3 | 6
WC | (Israel) S Pe'er | 2 | 6 | 3
(United States) L Raymond | 5 | 3
15 | (Japan) S Asagoe | 7 | 6
11 | (Serbia and Montenegro) J Janković | 6 | 6
(Spain) C Martínez | 0 | 3
(Bulgaria) M Maleeva | 3 | 0
7 | (Russia) N Petrova | 6 | 6

Third round
3 | (Russia) A Myskina | 6^{5} | 6^{7}
15 | (Japan) S Asagoe | 7^{7} | 7^{9}
11 | (Serbia and Montenegro) J Janković | 3 | 6^{5}
7 | (Russia) N Petrova | 6 | 7^{7}

Quarterfinals
15 | (Japan) S Asagoe | 0 | 6 | 2
7 | (Russia) N Petrova | 6 | 0 | 6

=== Bottom half ===
==== Section 3 ====
First round
(China) S Peng | 6 | 2
(United States) M Shaughnessy | 2 | 0^{r}
(Slovenia) K Srebotnik | 5 | 1
(Argentina) G Dulko | 7 | 6
(Israel) A Smashnova | 7 | 1 | 2
9 | (Russia) E Likhovtseva | 5 | 6 | 6
13 | (Japan) A Sugiyama | 6 | 7^{10}
(Spain) M Sánchez Lorenzo | 1 | 6^{8}
Q | (Ukraine) K Bondarenko | 6 | 4 | 3
(Czech Republic) B Strýcová | 4 | 6 | 6
(France) V Razzano | 7 | 0
(France) É Loit | 5 | 0^{r}

Second round
6 | (Russia) V Zvonareva | 4 | 6 | 7^{9}
(China) S Peng | 6 | 4 | 6^{7}
(Argentina) G Dulko | 3 | 7^{8} | 4
9 | (Russia) E Likhovtseva | 6 | 6^{6} | 6
13 | (Japan) A Sugiyama | 6^{3} | 6 | 6
(Czech Republic) B Strýcová | 7^{7} | 1 | 1
(France) V Razzano | 6 | 6
4 | (Australia) A Molik | 4 | 4

Third round
6 | (Russia) V Zvonareva | 6 | 6
9 | (Russia) E Likhovtseva | 4 | 4
13 | (Japan) A Sugiyama | 4 | 7^{7} | 5
(France) V Razzano | 6 | 6^{3} | 7

Quarterfinals
6 | (Russia) V Zvonareva | 4 | 4
(France) V Razzano | 6 | 6

==== Section 4 ====
First round
WC | (Australia) N Pratt | 1 | 6^{7}
(Czech Republic) D Chládková | 6 | 7^{9}
(Russia) E Linetskaya | 6 | 2 | 4
(Spain) A Medina Garrigues | 4 | 6 | 6
(Italy) T Garbin | 4 | 2
12 | (Italy) S Farina Elia | 6 | 6
14 | (France) M Pierce | 6 | 6
WC | (Czech Republic) D Bedáňová | 3 | 0
(Croatia) J Kostanić | 4 | 4
WC | (Greece) E Daniilidou | 6 | 6
(Spain) M Marrero | 2 | 5
(Madagascar) D Randriantefy | 6 | 7

Second round
8 | (Switzerland) P Schnyder | 6 | 6
(Czech Republic) D Chládková | 3 | 0
(Spain) A Medina Garrigues | 2 | 2
12 | (Italy) S Farina Elia | 6 | 6
14 | (France) M Pierce | 6 | 6
WC | (Greece) E Daniilidou | 0 | 2
(Madagascar) D Randriantefy | 3 | 1
2 | (United States) S Williams | 6 | 6

Third round
8 | (Switzerland) P Schnyder | 6 | 1 | 4
12 | (Italy) S Farina Elia | 4 | 6 | 6
14 | (France) M Pierce | 6^{5} | 4
2 | (United States) S Williams | 7^{7} | 6

Quarterfinals
12 | (Italy) S Farina Elia | 5 | 7^{9} | 0
2 | (United States) S Williams | 7 | 6^{7} | 0^{r}
