= 2004 Uncle Tobys Hardcourts – Doubles =

Doubles
- 2004 Uncle Tobys Hardcourts

Final
- Champions: (Russia) Svetlana Kuznetsova (Russia) Elena Likhovtseva
- Runners-up: (South Africa) Liezel Huber (Bulgaria) Magdalena Maleeva
- Score: 6–3, 6–4

Events
| Singles | Doubles |
| ← 2003 · | Australian Hard Court Championships | · 2005 → |

The doubles tournament for the 2004 Uncle Tobys Hardcourts was won by Russian pair, Svetlana Kuznetsova and Elena Likhovtseva who defeated South African player Liezel Huber and Magdalena Maleeva from Bulgaria 6–3, 6–4 in the final. For Kuznetsova, this was her second Gold Coast title after winning with Martina Navratilova in 2003. This was also Likhovtseva second Gold Coast title after winning the tournament in 1998 with Japanese doubles partner Ai Sugiyama.

== Seeds ==
1. (Russia) Svetlana Kuznetsova / (Russia) Elena Likhovtseva (champions)
2. (South Africa) Liezel Huber / (Bulgaria) Magdalena Maleeva (final)
3. (Russia) Nadia Petrova / (United States) Meghann Shaughnessy (quarterfinals)
4. (France) Émilie Loit / (Australia) Nicole Pratt (semifinals)

== Draw ==
=== Key ===
- Q = Qualifier
- WC = Wild card
- LL = Lucky loser
- Alt = Alternate
- SE = Special exempt
- PR = Protected ranking
- ITF = ITF entry
- JE = Junior exempt
- w/o = Walkover
- r = Retired
- d = Defaulted
- SR = Special ranking

=== Draw ===
First round
1 | (Russia) S Kuznetsova (Russia) E Likhovtseva | 6^{3} | 6 | 6
(Romania) R Dragomir Ilie (Russia) E Kulikovskaya | 7^{7} | 3 | 1
LL | (France) C Dhenin (Australia) L McShea | 5 | 3
Q | (Italy) S Farina Elia (Italy) F Schiavone | 7 | 6
4 | (France) É Loit (Australia) N Pratt | 6 | 6
(Australia) T Musgrave (United States) A Spears | 2 | 2
(Slovenia) T Križan (Slovenia) K Srebotnik | 5 | 1
WC | (Australia) S Stosur (Australia) C Wheeler | 7 | 6
(Russia) L Krasnoroutskaya (Russia) V Zvonareva | 7^{7} | 1 | 2
(Thailand) T Tanasugarn (Ukraine) E Tatarkova | 6^{2} | 6 | 6
(Czech Republic) D Bedanova (Spain) M Serna | 4 | 3
3 | (Russia) N Petrova (United States) M Shaughnessy | 6 | 6
(China) T Li (China) T Sun | 2 | 7 | 4
(Switzerland) M Casanova (Slovakia) J Husárová | 6 | 5 | 6
(Belgium) E Callens (France) S Cohen-Aloro | 6 | 2 | 6^{2}
2 | (South Africa) L Huber (Bulgaria) M Maleeva | 2 | 6 | 7^{7}

Quarterfinals
1 | (Russia) S Kuznetsova (Russia) E Likhovtseva | 7 | 6
Q | (Italy) S Farina Elia (Italy) F Schiavone | 5 | 2
4 | (France) É Loit (Australia) N Pratt | 7^{7} | 6
WC | (Australia) S Stosur (Australia) C Wheeler | 6^{5} | 3
(Thailand) T Tanasugarn (Ukraine) E Tatarkova | 6 | 3 | 7
3 | (Russia) N Petrova (United States) M Shaughnessy | 3 | 6 | 5
(Switzerland) M Casanova (Slovakia) J Husárová
2 | (South Africa) L Huber (Bulgaria) M Maleeva | w/o

Semifinals
1 | (Russia) S Kuznetsova (Russia) E Likhovtseva | 6 | 6
4 | (France) É Loit (Australia) N Pratt | 3 | 3
(Thailand) T Tanasugarn (Ukraine) E Tatarkova | 6 | 4 | 4
2 | (South Africa) L Huber (Bulgaria) M Maleeva | 2 | 6 | 6

Final
1 | (Russia) S Kuznetsova (Russia) E Likhovtseva | 6 | 6
2 | (South Africa) L Huber (Bulgaria) M Maleeva | 3 | 4
