= 2005 Uncle Tobys Hardcourts – Singles =

Singles
- 2005 Uncle Tobys Hardcourts

Final
- Champion: (Switzerland) Patty Schnyder
- Runner-up: (Australia) Samantha Stosur
- Score: 1–6, 6–3, 7–5

Details
- Draw: 32
- Seeds: 8

Events
Singles	Doubles
← 2004 ·	Australian Hard Court Championships	· 2006 →

Ai Sugiyama was the defending champion, but lost in the first round to Dinara Safina.

Patty Schnyder won the title by defeating Samantha Stosur 1–6, 6–3, 7–5 in the final.

== Seeds ==
1. (Russia) Nadia Petrova (quarterfinals, withdrew due to a glute strain)
2. (Switzerland) Patty Schnyder (champion)
3. (Japan) Ai Sugiyama (first round)
4. (Croatia) Karolina Šprem (first round)
5. (Italy) Silvia Farina Elia (semifinals)
6. (France) Nathalie Dechy (first round)
7. (Russia) Elena Likhovtseva (second round)
8. (Bulgaria) Magdalena Maleeva (quarterfinals)

== Draw ==
=== Key ===
- Q = Qualifier
- WC = Wild card
- LL = Lucky loser
- Alt = Alternate
- SE = Special exempt
- PR = Protected ranking
- ITF = ITF entry
- JE = Junior exempt
- w/o = Walkover
- r = Retired
- d = Defaulted
- SR = Special ranking

=== Finals ===
Semifinals
5	(Italy) Silvia Farina Elia	4	6	1
(Australia) Samantha Stosur	6	2	6
(France) Tatiana Golovin	6	4	3
2	(Switzerland) Patty Schnyder	3	6	6

Final
(Australia) Samantha Stosur	6	3	5
2	(Switzerland) Patty Schnyder	1	6	7

=== Top half ===
First round
1	(Russia) N Petrova	6	6
(China) J Zheng	2	3
(China) N Li	6	6
(Italy) T Garbin	3	1
(Czech Republic) D Chládková	4	6	7
(France) S Beltrame	6	4	5
(France) S Foretz	3	5
5	(Italy) S Farina Elia	6	7
4	(Croatia) K Šprem	4	2
(Australia) S Stosur	6	6
(Czech Republic) I Benešová	6	6
WC	(Australia) T Welford	4	2
WC	(Australia) J Hewitt	4	6	2
(Czech Republic) K Koukalová	6	1	6
(Ukraine) Y Fedak	4	1
8	(Bulgaria) M Maleeva	6	6

Second round
1	(Russia) N Petrova	7	6
(China) N Li	5	3
(Czech Republic) D Chládková	7	1	3
5	(Italy) S Farina Elia	5	6	6
(Australia) S Stosur	6	7^{7}
(Czech Republic) I Benešová	2	6^{3}
(Czech Republic) K Koukalová	5	2
8	(Bulgaria) M Maleeva	7	6

Quarterfinals
1	(Russia) N Petrova
5	(Italy) S Farina Elia	w/o
(Australia) S Stosur	2	6	6
8	(Bulgaria) M Maleeva	6	3	4

Semifinals
5	(Italy) S Farina Elia	4	6	1
(Australia) S Stosur	6	2	6

=== Bottom half ===
First round
6	(France) N Dechy	6^{7}	1
(Italy) F Pennetta	7^{9}	6
Q	(France) C Pin	6	6
(Germany) A Barna	2	4
(France) T Golovin	6	6
Q	(China) Z Yan	1	4
(Russia) D Safina	6	6
3	(Japan) A Sugiyama	3	2
7	(Russia) E Likhovtseva	4	7^{7}	6
(France) É Loit	6	6^{5}	2
Q	(Bulgaria) S Karatantcheva	6	6
(Italy) ME Camerin	2	4
Q	(United States) A Haynes	6	6
LL	(France) S Cohen-Aloro	3	1
(France) V Razzano	2	4
2	(Switzerland) P Schnyder	6	6

Second round
(Italy) F Pennetta	6	4	6
Q	(France) C Pin	2	6	3
(France) T Golovin	7	3	6
(Russia) D Safina	5	6	2
7	(Russia) E Likhovtseva	2	6	6^{3}
Q	(Bulgaria) S Karatantcheva	6	0	7^{7}
Q	(United States) A Haynes	4	1
2	(Switzerland) P Schnyder	6	6

Quarterfinals
(Italy) F Pennetta	7^{7}	2	4
(France) T Golovin	6^{5}	6	6
Q	(Bulgaria) S Karatantcheva	2	2
2	(Switzerland) P Schnyder	6	6

Semifinals
(France) T Golovin	6	4	3
2	(Switzerland) P Schnyder	3	6	6
