= 2008 Regions Morgan Keegan Championships and the Cellular South Cup =

2008 Regions Morgan Keegan Championships and Cellular South Cup
- Date: February 24 – March 2
- Edition: 33rd (men) / 23rd (women)
- Surface: Hard / indoor
- Location: Memphis, Tennessee, USA
- Venue: Racquet Club of Memphis

Champions

Men's singles
- (Belgium) Steve Darcis

Women's singles
- (United States) Lindsay Davenport

Men's doubles
- (India) Mahesh Bhupathi / (The Bahamas) Mark Knowles

Women's doubles
- (United States) Lindsay Davenport / (United States) Lisa Raymond
← 2007 ·	Regions Morgan Keegan Championships	· 2009 →
← 2007 ·	Cellular South Cup	· 2009 →

The 2008 Regions Morgan Keegan Championships and the Cellular South Cup were tennis tournaments played on indoor hard courts. It was the 33rd edition of the Regions Morgan Keegan Championships, the 23rd edition of the Cellular South Cup, and was part of the International Series Gold of the 2008 ATP Tour, and of the Tier III Series of the 2008 WTA Tour. Both the men's and the women's events took place at the Racquet Club of Memphis in Memphis, Tennessee, United States, from February 24 through March 2, 2008.

The men's singles featured ATP No. 6, 2007 Davis Cup champion and recent San Jose winner Andy Roddick, other Davis Cup champion, Australian Open quarterfinalist and Delray Beach runner-up James Blake, and three-time Memphis winner, defending champion Tommy Haas. Other seeded players were San Jose finalist Radek Štěpánek, Delray Beach semifinalist Sam Querrey, Thomas Johansson, Jürgen Melzer and Robin Söderling.

The women's side included WTA No. 8, Australian Open quarterfinalist and Memphis defending champion Venus Williams, Portorož winner Tatiana Golovin, and Australian Open doubles runner-up and 2007 Memphis finalist Shahar Pe'er. Also competing were 1997 Cellular South Cup titlist and recent Auckland champion Lindsay Davenport, Quebec City quarterfinalist Olga Govortsova, Caroline Wozniacki, Sofia Arvidsson and Laura Granville.

== Finals ==
=== Men's singles ===
(Belgium) Steve Darcis defeated (Sweden) Robin Söderling 6–3, 7–6^{(7–5)}

- It was Darcis' 1st title of the year, and his 2nd overall.

=== Women's singles ===
(United States) Lindsay Davenport defeated (Belarus) Olga Govortsova 6–2, 6–1

- It was Davenport's 2nd title of the year, and her 55th overall. It was her 2nd win at the event.

=== Men's doubles ===
(India) Mahesh Bhupathi / (The Bahamas) Mark Knowles defeated (Thailand) Sanchai Ratiwatana / (Thailand) Sonchat Ratiwatana, 7–6^{(7–5)}, 6–2

=== Women's doubles ===
(United States) Lindsay Davenport / (United States) Lisa Raymond defeated (United States) Angela Haynes / (United States) Mashona Washington, 6–3, 6–1
