= 2006 Mondial Australian Women's Hardcourts – Singles =

Singles
- 2006 Mondial Australian Women's Hardcourts

Final
- Champion: (Czech Republic) Lucie Šafářová
- Runner-up: (Italy) Flavia Pennetta
- Score: 6–3, 6–4

Details
- Draw: 32
- Seeds: 8

Events
Singles	Doubles
← 2005 ·	Australian Hard Court Championships	· 2007 →

Patty Schnyder was the defending champion, but lost in quarterfinals to Lucie Šafářová.

Lucie Šafářová won the title by defeating Flavia Pennetta 6–3, 6–4 in the final.

== Seeds ==
1. (Switzerland) Patty Schnyder (quarterfinals)
2. (Italy) Francesca Schiavone (second round)
3. (Russia) Dinara Safina (semifinals)
4. (Italy) Flavia Pennetta (final)
5. (France) Tatiana Golovin (quarterfinals)
6. (Japan) Ai Sugiyama (first round)
7. (Czech Republic) Klára Koukalová (second round)
8. (Spain) Anabel Medina Garrigues (quarterfinals)

== Draw ==
=== Key ===
- Q = Qualifier
- WC = Wild card
- LL = Lucky loser
- Alt = Alternate
- SE = Special exempt
- PR = Protected ranking
- ITF = ITF entry
- JE = Junior exempt
- w/o = Walkover
- r = Retired
- d = Defaulted
- SR = Special ranking

=== Finals ===
Semifinals
(Czech Republic) Lucie Šafářová	6	6
3	(Russia) Dinara Safina	4	2
4	(Italy) Flavia Pennetta	1	7^{7}	6
WC	(Switzerland) Martina Hingis	6	6^{2}	2

Final
(Czech Republic) Lucie Šafářová	6	6
4	(Italy) Flavia Pennetta	3	4

=== Top half ===
First round
1	(Switzerland) P Schnyder	6	7^{7}
(France) V Razzano	3	6^{2}
(Croatia) K Šprem	6	0	5
Q	(United States) A Haynes	2	6	7
Q	(Slovakia) J Gajdošová	5	6	6
(Italy) T Garbin	7	4	2
(Czech Republic) L Šafářová	6	6
6	(Japan) A Sugiyama	1	2
3	(Russia) D Safina	7^{7}	6
(Russia) E Linetskaya	6^{0}	0
(Czech Republic) I Benešová	7	6
WC	(Australia) S Ferguson	5	2
(Italy) An Serra Zanetti	6	4	3
(Japan) A Nakamura	2	6	6
(United States) A Rolle	3	3
8	(Spain) A Medina Garrigues	6	6

Second round
1	(Switzerland) P Schnyder	6	6
Q	(United States) A Haynes	3	0
Q	(Slovakia) J Gajdošová	6	5	4
(Czech Republic) L Šafářová	4	7	6
3	(Russia) D Safina	6	6
(Czech Republic) I Benešová	0	1
(Japan) A Nakamura	4	4
8	(Spain) A Medina Garrigues	6	6

Quarterfinals
1	(Switzerland) P Schnyder	4	3
(Czech Republic) L Šafářová	6	6
3	(Russia) D Safina	6	6
8	(Spain) A Medina Garrigues	1	3

Semifinals
(Czech Republic) L Šafářová	6	6
3	(Russia) D Safina	4	2

=== Bottom half ===
First round
5	(France) T Golovin	7	6
WC	(Australia) N Pratt	5	2
(Austria) S Bammer	6	6
(Czech Republic) K Böhmová	3	1
(Italy) R Vinci	4	0
(China) N Li	6	6
(Russia) E Bychkova	2	4
4	(Italy) F Pennetta	6	6
7	(Czech Republic) K Koukalová	6	6
(United States) M Shaughnessy	4	4
(Venezuela) M Vento-Kabchi	2	1
WC	(Switzerland) M Hingis	6	6
Q	(China) T Sun	6	2	4
(Spain) N Llagostera Vives	2	6	6
Q	(China) M Yuan	2	3
2	(Italy) F Schiavone	6	6

Second round
5	(France) T Golovin	6	6
(Austria) S Bammer	1	3
(China) N Li	2	2
4	(Italy) F Pennetta	6	6
7	(Czech Republic) K Koukalová	3	2
WC	(Switzerland) M Hingis	6	6
(Spain) N Llagostera Vives	6	6
2	(Italy) F Schiavone	3	1

Quarterfinals
5	(France) T Golovin	2	7	3
4	(Italy) F Pennetta	6	5	6
WC	(Switzerland) M Hingis	6	4	6
(Spain) N Llagostera Vives	2	6	0

Semifinals
4	(Italy) F Pennetta	1	7^{7}	6
WC	(Switzerland) M Hingis	6	6^{2}	2
