= 2007 Mondial Australian Women's Hardcourts =

Coordinates: 28.0167°S 153.4°E

- Date: 31 December – 6 January
- Edition: 11th
- Category: Tier III
- Draw: 32S / 16D
- Prize money: US$175,000
- Surface: Hard / outdoor
- Location: Gold Coast, Queensland, Australia

Champions

Singles
- (Russia) Dinara Safina

Doubles
- (Russia) Dinara Safina / (Slovenia) Katarina Srebotnik
← 2006 ·	Australian Hard Court Championships	· 2008 →

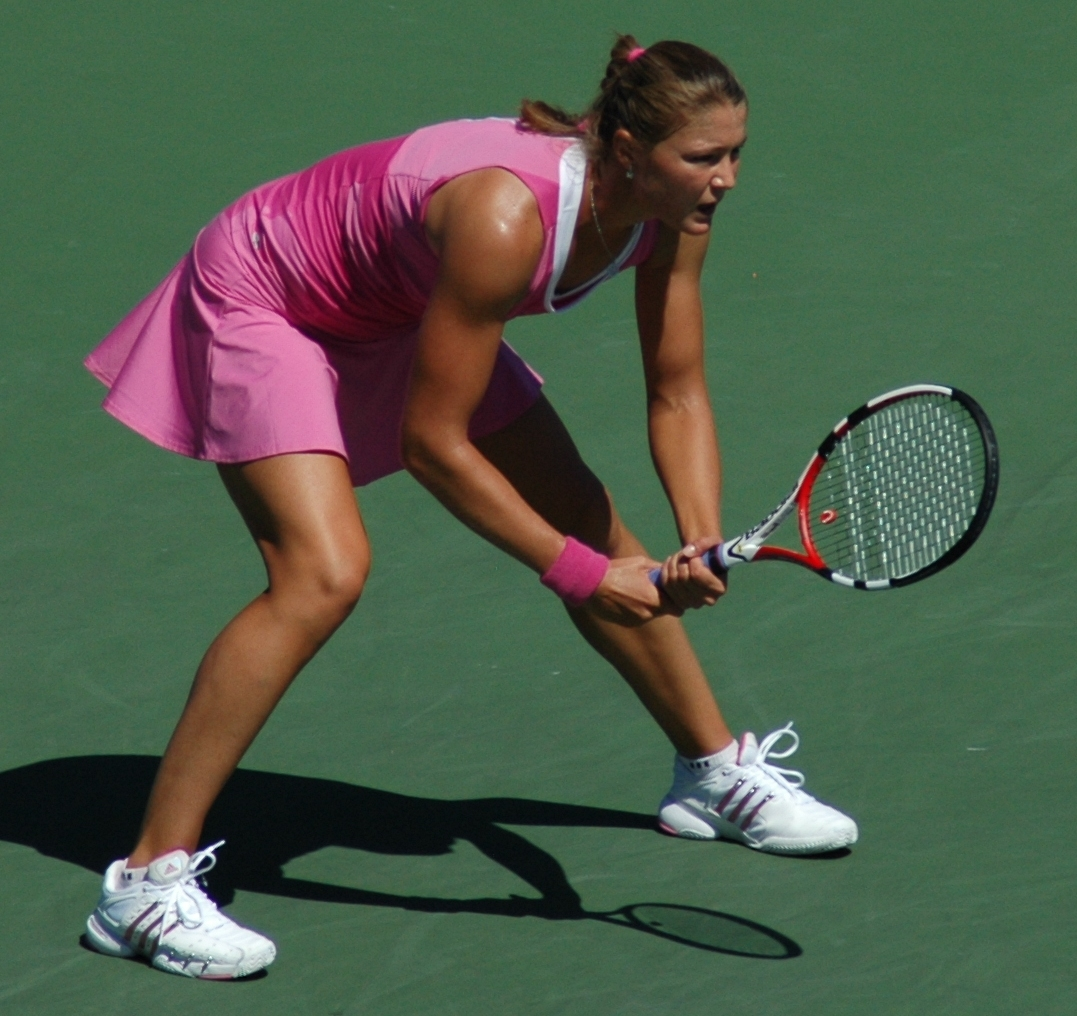
2007 Mondial Australian Woman's Hardcourts

The 2007 Mondial Australian Women's Hardcourts was a women's tennis tournament played on outdoor hard courts. It was the 11th edition of the Brisbane International, and was a Tier III event on the 2007 WTA Tour. It took place in Gold Coast, Queensland, Australia, from 31 December 2006 through 6 January 2007. Second-seeded Dinara Safina won the singles title and earned $25,840 first-prize money.

== Points and prize money ==
=== Point distribution ===
Event	W	F	SF	QF	Round of 16	Round of 32	Q	Q3	Q2	Q1
Singles	140	100	65	35	20	1	8	4	3	1
Doubles	140	100	65	35	1	—	—	—	—	—

=== Prize money ===
Event	W	F	SF	QF	Round of 16	Round of 32	Q3	Q2	Q1
Singles	$25,800	$13,520	$7,105	$3,740	$2,030	$1,205	$605	$325	$185
Doubles^{*}	$7,620	$4,020	$2,170	$1,160	$600	—	—	—	—

^{*} per team

== WTA entrants ==
=== Seeds ===
Country	Player	Rank^{1}	Seed
SUI	Martina Hingis	7	1
RUS	Dinara Safina	11	2
SRB	Ana Ivanovic	14	3
GER	Anna-Lena Grönefeld	19	4
ISR	Shahar Pe'er	20	5
CHN	Li Na	21	6
SLO	Katarina Srebotnik	23	7
JPN	Ai Sugiyama	26	8

- Rankings as of 18 December 2006.

=== Other entrants ===
The following players received wildcards into the singles main draw:

- (Australia) Sophie Ferguson
- (Australia) Shannon Golds
- (Australia) Nicole Pratt

The following players received entry from the qualifying draw:

- (Ukraine) Yuliana Fedak
- (United States) Vania King
- (Italy) Roberta Vinci
- (Czech Republic) Sandra Záhlavová

== Finals ==
=== Singles ===
(Russia) Dinara Safina defeated (Switzerland) Martina Hingis, 6–3, 3–6, 7–5

- It was Safina's only singles title of the year and the 5th of her career.

=== Doubles ===
(Russia) Dinara Safina / (Slovenia) Katarina Srebotnik defeated (Czech Republic) Iveta Benešová / (Russia) Galina Voskoboeva
