= 2003 Uncle Tobys Hardcourts – Doubles =

Doubles
- 2003 Uncle Tobys Hardcourts

Final
- Champions: (Russia) Svetlana Kuznetsova (United States) Martina Navratilova
- Runners-up: (France) Nathalie Dechy (France) Émilie Loit
- Score: 6–4, 6–4

Events
Singles	Doubles
← 2002 ·	Australian Hard Court Championships	· 2004 →

Justine Henin-Hardenne and Meghann Shaughnessy were the defending champions, but Henin-Hardenne did not compete this year as she chose to start her season in Sydney. Shaughnessy teamed up with Ai Sugiyama and reached the quarterfinals where they were forced to withdraw.

Svetlana Kuznetsova and Martina Navratilova won the title by defeating Nathalie Dechy and Émilie Loit 6–4, 6–4 in the final. It was the 4th title for Kuznetsova and the 167th title for Navratilova in their respective doubles careers.

== Seeds ==
1. (United States) Meghann Shaughnessy / (Japan) Ai Sugiyama (quarterfinals, withdrew)
2. (Belgium) Els Callens / (Japan) Rika Fujiwara (quarterfinals)
3. (Australia) Nicole Pratt / (Sweden) Åsa Svensson (first round)
4. (Austria) Barbara Schett / (Switzerland) Patty Schnyder (semifinals)

== Draw ==
=== Key ===
- Q = Qualifier
- WC = Wild card
- LL = Lucky loser
- Alt = Alternate
- SE = Special exempt
- PR = Protected ranking
- ITF = ITF entry
- JE = Junior exempt
- w/o = Walkover
- r = Retired
- d = Defaulted
- SR = Special ranking

=== Draw ===
First round
1	(United States) M Shaughnessy (Japan) A Sugiyama	6	6
Q	(Australia) S Stone (Australia) S Stosur	0	1
(Russia) S Kuznetsova (United States) M Navratilova	4	6	6
(Russia) E Kulikovskaya (Belarus) T Poutchek	6	3	1
4	(Austria) B Schett (Switzerland) P Schnyder	1	7^{7}	6
(Italy) T Garbin (Italy) F Schiavone	6	6^{5}	0
(Australia) L McShea (Kazakhstan) I Selyutina	3	6	6
WC	(Australia) D Dominikovic (Australia) S Ferguson	6	2	3
(France) N Dechy (France) É Loit	6	6
(Australia) T Musgrave (Ukraine) T Perebiynis	3	0
(Russia) L Krasnoroutskaya (Russia) N Petrova	6	6
3	(Australia) N Pratt (Sweden) Å Svensson	2	3
(Germany) B Rittner (Venezuela) M Vento-Kabchi	5	5
(Slovenia) M Matevžič (Italy) R Vinci	7	7
(United States) A Augustus (South Africa) N Grandin	4	6	1
2	(Belgium) E Callens (Japan) R Fujiwara	6	3	6

Quarterfinals
1	(United States) M Shaughnessy (Japan) A Sugiyama
(Russia) S Kuznetsova (United States) M Navratilova	w/o
4	(Austria) B Schett (Switzerland) P Schnyder	6	7^{7}
(Australia) L McShea (Kazakhstan) I Selyutina	3	6^{5}
(France) N Dechy (France) É Loit	w/o
(Russia) L Krasnoroutskaya (Russia) N Petrova
(Slovenia) M Matevžič (Italy) R Vinci	6	6
2	(Belgium) E Callens (Japan) R Fujiwara	4	2

Semifinals
(Russia) S Kuznetsova (United States) M Navratilova	6	7^{7}
4	(Austria) B Schett (Switzerland) P Schnyder	4	6^{5}
(France) N Dechy (France) É Loit	6	3	6
(Slovenia) M Matevžič (Italy) R Vinci	3	6	1

Final
(Russia) S Kuznetsova (United States) M Navratilova	6	6
(France) N Dechy (France) É Loit	4	4
