= 2007 Cellular South Cup – Singles =

Singles
- 2007 Regions Morgan Keegan Championships and the Cellular South Cup

Final
- Champion: (United States) Venus Williams
- Runner-up: (Israel) Shahar Pe'er
- Score: 6–1, 6–1

Details
- Draw: 32
- Seeds: 8

Events
Singles	men	women
Doubles	men	women
- Regions Morgan Keegan Championships Cellular South Cup

Sofia Arvidsson was the defending champion, but lost in the quarterfinals to Meilen Tu.

Venus Williams won in the final 6–1, 6–1, against Shahar Pe'er.

== Seeds ==
1. (Israel) Shahar Pe'er (final)
2. (France) Tatiana Golovin (withdrew due to an upper respiratory infection)
3. (France) Marion Bartoli (first round)
4. (Australia) Samantha Stosur (quarterfinals, retired due to a viral illness)
5. (Australia) Nicole Pratt (second round)
6. (United States) Shenay Perry (second round, retired due to a right knee injury)
7. (United States) Venus Williams (champion)
8. (United States) Jill Craybas (second round)
9. (United States) Vania King (first round)

== Draw ==
Key

- Q = Qualifier
- WC = Wild card
- LL = Lucky loser
- Alt = Alternate
- ITF = ITF entry
- PR = Protected ranking
- SR = Special ranking
- SE = Special exempt
- JE = Junior exempt
- JR = Junior Accelerator Programme entrant
- CO = College Accelerator Programme entrant
- NG = Next Gen Accelerator Program entrant
- w/o = Walkover
- r = Retired
- d = Defaulted

=== Finals ===
Semifinals
1	(Israel) Shahar Pe'er	6	7
(United States) Meilen Tu	4	5
Q	(Romania) Ioana Raluca Olaru	3	2
7	(United States) Venus Williams	6	6

Final
1	(Israel) Shahar Pe'er	1	1
7	(United States) Venus Williams	6	6

=== Top half ===
First round
1	(Israel) S Pe'er	6	6
(Finland) E Laine	4	3
Q	(Russia) A Jidkova	4	6	5
(Venezuela) M Sequera	6	1	7
WC	(United States) L Raymond	2	5
(United States) B Mattek	6	7
LL	(France) Y Fedossova	7	3	5
6	(United States) S Perry	6^{4}	6	7
5	(Australia) N Pratt	6	6
(United States) L Osterloh	3	0
(Sweden) S Arvidsson	6	0	6
(Russia) E Bychkova	3	6	4
(United States) M Tu	6	6
(United States) A Harkleroad	4	3
Q	(Republic of Ireland) K Liggan	4	4
8	(United States) J Craybas	6	6

Second round
1	(Israel) S Pe'er	6	6
(Venezuela) M Sequera	0	0
(United States) B Mattek	6	0
6	(United States) S Perry	2	1	r
5	(Australia) N Pratt	7	4	3
(Sweden) S Arvidsson	5	6	6
(United States) M Tu	6	6
8	(United States) J Craybas	3	1

Quarterfinals
1	(Israel) S Pe'er	6	6
(United States) B Mattek	0	3
(Sweden) S Arvidsson	0	2
(United States) M Tu	6	6

Semifinals
1	(Israel) S Pe'er	6	7
(United States) M Tu	4	5

=== Bottom half ===
First round
9	(United States) V King	6	2	6^{0}
Q	(United States) A Spears	4	6	7
WC	(United States) L Albanese	6	4	3
Q	(Romania) IR Olaru	3	6	6
(France) C Pin	7	6
(Uzbekistan) V Lepchenko	5	1
(Canada) A Wozniak	2	5
4	(Australia) S Stosur	6	7
7	(United States) V Williams	6	2	6
(Japan) A Morigami	1	6	4
WC	(Denmark) C Wozniacki	2	7	6
(France) S Foretz	6	6^{5}	3
(Czech Republic) E Birnerová	5	3
(Slovakia) J Gajdošová	7	6
(United States) L Granville	7	4	6
3	(France) M Bartoli	5	6	0

Second round
Q	(United States) A Spears	3	3
Q	(Romania) IR Olaru	6	6
(France) C Pin	2	7	1
4	(Australia) S Stosur	6	6^{1}	6
7	(United States) V Williams	6	6
WC	(Denmark) C Wozniacki	4	4
(Slovakia) J Gajdošová	5	6	5
(United States) L Granville	7	3	7

Quarterfinals
Q	(Romania) IR Olaru	5
4	(Australia) S Stosur	1	r
7	(United States) V Williams	7	6
(United States) L Granville	6^{2}	4

Semifinals
Q	(Romania) IR Olaru	3	2
7	(United States) V Williams	6	6
