= 2007 Regions Morgan Keegan Championships – Doubles =

Doubles
- 2007 Regions Morgan Keegan Championships and the Cellular South Cup

Final
- Champions: (United States) Eric Butorac (United Kingdom) Jamie Murray
- Runners-up: (Austria) Julian Knowle (Austria) Jürgen Melzer
- Score: 7–5, 6–3

Events
Singles	men	women
Doubles	men	women
- Regions Morgan Keegan Championships Cellular South Cup

Chris Haggard and Ivo Karlović were the defending champions, but Karlovic chose not to participate, and only Haggard competed that year.
Haggard partnered with James Auckland, but lost in the first round to Simon Aspelin and Robert Lindstedt.

Eric Butorac and Jamie Murray won in the final 7–5, 6–3, against Julian Knowle and Jürgen Melzer.

== Seeds ==
1. (Israel) Jonathan Erlich / (Israel) Andy Ram (quarterfinals)
2. (Austria) Julian Knowle / (Austria) Jürgen Melzer (final)
3. (Czech Republic) František Čermák / (Czech Republic) Jaroslav Levinský (quarterfinals)
4. (Sweden) Simon Aspelin / (Sweden) Robert Lindstedt (quarterfinals)

== Draw ==
Key

- Q = Qualifier
- WC = Wild card
- LL = Lucky loser
- Alt = Alternate
- ITF = ITF entry
- PR = Protected ranking
- SR = Special ranking
- SE = Special exempt
- JE = Junior exempt
- JR = Junior Accelerator Programme entrant
- CO = College Accelerator Programme entrant
- NG = Next Gen Accelerator Program entrant
- w/o = Walkover
- r = Retired
- d = Defaulted

=== Draw ===
First round
1	(Israel) J Erlich (Israel) A Ram	6	7^{8}
(South Africa) W Moodie (Australia) T Perry	3	6^{6}
(United States) E Butorac (United Kingdom) J Murray	7^{8}	6
(Australia) A Fisher (United States) T Parrott	6^{6}	2
4	(Sweden) S Aspelin (Sweden) R Lindstedt	6	6
(United Kingdom) J Auckland (South Africa) C Haggard	3	3
(France) J Benneteau (Sweden) T Johansson	6	6
(United States) R Ginepri (United States) R Kendrick	4	1
(Germany) B Becker (Russia) I Kunitsyn	6	6
(United States) P Goldstein (United States) J Thomas	2	2
ALT	(South Korea) H-t Lee (Thailand) D Udomchoke	4	4
3	(Czech Republic) F Čermák (Czech Republic) J Levinský	6	6
WC	(Spain) F López (United States) S Querrey	4	7^{8}	[10]
(Australia) J Kerr (Czech Republic) D Škoch	6	6^{6}	[8]
WC	(United States) S Lipsky (United States) D Martin	4	1
2	(Austria) J Knowle (Austria) J Melzer	6	6

Quarterfinals
1	(Israel) J Erlich (Israel) A Ram	4	4
(United States) E Butorac (United Kingdom) J Murray	6	6
4	(Sweden) S Aspelin (Sweden) R Lindstedt	7^{7}	5	[8]
(France) J Benneteau (Sweden) T Johansson	6^{5}	7	[10]
(Germany) B Becker (Russia) I Kunitsyn	w/o
3	(Czech Republic) F Čermák (Czech Republic) J Levinský
WC	(Spain) F López (United States) S Querrey	6^{4}	6	[4]
2	(Austria) J Knowle (Austria) J Melzer	7^{7}	4	[10]

Semifinals
(United States) E Butorac (United Kingdom) J Murray	5	7^{7}	[12]
(France) J Benneteau (Sweden) T Johansson	7	6^{2}	[10]
(Germany) B Becker (Russia) I Kunitsyn	1	4
2	(Austria) J Knowle (Austria) J Melzer	6	6

Final
(United States) E Butorac (United Kingdom) J Murray	7	6
2	(Austria) J Knowle (Austria) J Melzer	5	3
