= 2003 Uncle Tobys Hardcourts – Singles =

Singles
- 2003 Uncle Tobys Hardcourts

Final
- Champion: (France) Nathalie Dechy
- Runner-up: (Switzerland) Marie-Gaïané Mikaelian
- Score: 6–3, 3–6, 6–3

Details
- Draw: 30
- Seeds: 8

Events
Singles	Doubles
- Australian Hard Court Championships

Venus Williams was the defending champion, but did not compete this year.

Nathalie Dechy won the title by defeating Marie-Gaïané Mikaelian 6–3, 3–6, 6–3 in the final. It was the 1st and only title for Dechy in her singles career.

== Seeds ==
The first two seeds received a bye into the second round.

1. (Switzerland) Patty Schnyder (semi-finals)
2. (France) Nathalie Dechy (champion)
3. (Japan) Ai Sugiyama (first round)
4. (Russia) Elena Bovina (semi-finals)
5. (Thailand) Tamarine Tanasugarn (first round)
6. (United States) Meghann Shaughnessy (quarter-finals, withdrew)
7. (Croatia) Iva Majoli (first round)
8. (Austria) Barbara Schett (quarter-finals)

== Draw ==
Key

- Q = Qualifier
- WC = Wild card
- LL = Lucky loser
- Alt = Alternate
- ITF = ITF entry
- PR = Protected ranking
- SR = Special ranking
- SE = Special exempt
- JE = Junior exempt
- JR = Junior Accelerator Programme entrant
- CO = College Accelerator Programme entrant
- NG = Next Gen Accelerator Program entrant
- w/o = Walkover
- r = Retired
- d = Defaulted

=== Finals ===
Semi-finals
1	(Switzerland) Patty Schnyder	4	2
(Switzerland) Marie-Gaïané Mikaelian	6	6
4	(Russia) Elena Bovina	4	6	5
2	(France) Nathalie Dechy	6	3	7

Final
(Switzerland) Marie-Gaïané Mikaelian	3	6	3
2	(France) Nathalie Dechy	6	3	6

=== Top half ===
First round
(Spain) C Torrens Valero	5	1^{r}
(Italy) F Schiavone	7	2
(Colombia) F Zuluaga	3	1
Q	(Russia) L Krasnoroutskaya	6	6
(Switzerland) M Casanova	4	3
6	(United States) M Shaughnessy	6	6
3	(Japan) A Sugiyama	6^{6}	6	5
Q	(Spain) M Sánchez Lorenzo	7^{8}	3	7
(France) É Loit	6	7^{7}
(Slovenia) T Pisnik	0	6^{0}
(France) M Bartoli	4	7^{7}	3
(Croatia) S Talaja	6	6^{4}	6
(Switzerland) M-G Mikaelian	7^{7}	6
7	(Croatia) I Majoli	6^{4}	3

Second round
1	(Switzerland) P Schnyder	6	6
(Italy) F Schiavone	3	4
Q	(Russia) L Krasnoroutskaya	3	6^{6}
6	(United States) M Shaughnessy	6	7^{8}
Q	(Spain) M Sánchez Lorenzo	7	6
(France) É Loit	5	4
(Croatia) S Talaja	4	2
(Switzerland) M-G Mikaelian	6	6

Quarter-finals
1	(Switzerland) P Schnyder	w/o
6	(United States) M Shaughnessy
Q	(Spain) M Sánchez Lorenzo	4	6	4
(Switzerland) M-G Mikaelian	6	2	6

Semi-finals
1	(Switzerland) P Schnyder	4	2
(Switzerland) M-G Mikaelian	6	6

=== Bottom half ===
First round
WC/5	(Thailand) T Tanasugarn	6^{6}	3
(Italy) T Garbin	7^{8}	6
Q	(South Africa) C Scheepers	6	7^{15}
WC	(Australia) S Stosur	4	6^{13}
(Germany) B Rittner	3	6	3
Q	(Russia) N Petrova	6	1	6
WC	(Russia) S Kuznetsova	5	4
4	(Russia) E Bovina	7	6
8	(Austria) B Schett	6	6
(Croatia) J Kostanić	2	4
(Belgium) E Callens	6	7
(Slovenia) M Matevžič	1	5
(Australia) N Pratt	4	6	6
(Sweden) Å Svensson	6	2	1

Second round
(Italy) T Garbin	6	6
Q	(South Africa) C Scheepers	0	4
Q	(Russia) N Petrova	7	3	3
4	(Russia) E Bovina	5	6	6
8	(Austria) B Schett	7	6
(Belgium) E Callens	5	3
(Australia) N Pratt	6	5	3
2	(France) N Dechy	2	7	6

Quarter-finals
(Italy) T Garbin	1	6	4
4	(Russia) E Bovina	6	2	6
8	(Austria) B Schett	4	2
2	(France) N Dechy	6	6

Semi-finals
4	(Russia) E Bovina	4	6	5
2	(France) N Dechy	6	3	7
