= 2008 Cellular South Cup – Singles =

Singles
- 2008 Regions Morgan Keegan Championships and the Cellular South Cup

Final
- Champion: (United States) Lindsay Davenport
- Runner-up: (Belarus) Olga Govortsova
- Score: 6–2, 6–1

Details
- Draw: 32
- Seeds: 8

Events
Singles	men	women
Doubles	men	women
- Regions Morgan Keegan Championships Cellular South Cup

Venus Williams was the defending champion, but lost in the first round to Petra Kvitová.

Lindsay Davenport won in the final 6–2, 6–1, against Olga Govortsova.

== Seeds ==
1. (United States) Venus Williams (first round)
2. (France) Tatiana Golovin (first round)
3. (Israel) Shahar Pe'er (semifinals)
4. (United States) Lindsay Davenport (champion)
5. (Belarus) Olga Govortsova (final)
6. (Denmark) Caroline Wozniacki (quarterfinals)
7. (Sweden) Sofia Arvidsson (quarterfinals)
8. (United States) Laura Granville (withdrew)

== Draw ==
Key

- Q = Qualifier
- WC = Wild card
- LL = Lucky loser
- Alt = Alternate
- ITF = ITF entry
- PR = Protected ranking
- SR = Special ranking
- SE = Special exempt
- JE = Junior exempt
- JR = Junior Accelerator Programme entrant
- CO = College Accelerator Programme entrant
- NG = Next Gen Accelerator Program entrant
- w/o = Walkover
- r = Retired
- d = Defaulted

=== Finals ===
Semifinals
Q	(New Zealand) Marina Erakovic	0	3
4	(United States) Lindsay Davenport	6	6
3	(Israel) Shahar Pe'er	3	6	4
5	(Belarus) Olga Govortsova	6	3	6

Final
4	(United States) Lindsay Davenport	6	6
5	(Belarus) Olga Govortsova	2	1

=== Top half ===
First round
1	(United States) V Williams	6	4	3
Q	(Czech Republic) P Kvitová	2	6	6
Q	(Netherlands) B Schultz-McCarthy	3	7	2
(Russia) A Kudryavtseva	6	5	6
WC	(United States) A Liu	6	6
(Ukraine) Y Fedak	4	3
Q	(New Zealand) M Erakovic	2	6	6
LL	(Russia) A Jidkova	6	3	4
4	(United States) L Davenport	7	6
Q	(Germany) S Lisicki	5	3
(Russia) E Rodina	7	6
(Belarus) A Yakimova	5	4
(France) S Cohen-Aloro	5	0	r
WC	(Portugal) M Larcher de Brito	7	1
(Venezuela) M Sequera	0	2
6	(Denmark) C Wozniacki	6	6

Second round
Q	(Czech Republic) P Kvitová	7	5	1
(Russia) A Kudryavtseva	6^{6}	7	6
WC	(United States) A Liu	5	3
Q	(New Zealand) M Erakovic	7	6
4	(United States) L Davenport	6	6
(Russia) E Rodina	1	1
WC	(Portugal) M Larcher de Brito	2	4
6	(Denmark) C Wozniacki	6	6

Quarterfinals
(Russia) A Kudryavtseva	6	3	3
Q	(New Zealand) M Erakovic	4	6	6
4	(United States) L Davenport	6	6
6	(Denmark) C Wozniacki	0	2

Semifinals
Q	(New Zealand) M Erakovic	0	3
4	(United States) L Davenport	6	6

=== Bottom half ===
First round
7	(Sweden) S Arvidsson	7	5	6
(France) S Brémond	6^{3}	7	1
(United States) V King	2	6	1
(Canada) S Dubois	6	2	6
(Russia) O Poutchkova	3	6	4
(Hungary) M Czink	6	3	6
(United States) A Rolle	2	1
3	(Israel) S Pe'er	6	6
5	(Belarus) O Govortsova	6	6
(United States) M Washington	4	2
(Czech Republic) R Voráčová	6	6^{5}	7
(Estonia) M Ani	3	7	6^{3}
WC	(Germany) J Görges	7	7
(United States) L Osterloh	6^{3}	6^{3}
(United States) B Mattek	6	6
2	(France) T Golovin	4	4

Second round
7	(Sweden) S Arvidsson	1	7	6
(Canada) S Dubois	6	5	3
(Hungary) M Czink	0	6	2
3	(Israel) S Pe'er	6	3	6
5	(Belarus) O Govortsova	4	6	7
(Czech Republic) R Voráčová	6	4	6^{5}
WC	(Germany) J Görges	6	6
(United States) B Mattek	4	3

Quarterfinals
7	(Sweden) S Arvidsson	6	1	3
3	(Israel) S Pe'er	3	6	6
5	(Belarus) O Govortsova	7	6
WC	(Germany) J Görges	6^{5}	2

Semifinals
3	(Israel) S Pe'er	3	6	4
5	(Belarus) O Govortsova	6	3	6
