= 2003 Uncle Tobys Hardcourts =

Coordinates: 28.0167°S 153.4°E

- Date: 29 December 2002 – 4 January 2003
- Edition: 7th
- Category: Tier III
- Draw: 32S / 16D
- Prize money: $170,000
- Surface: Hard / outdoor
- Location: Gold Coast, Australia

Champions

Singles
- (France) Nathalie Dechy

Doubles
- (Russia) Svetlana Kuznetsova (United States) Martina Navratilova
- Australian Hard Court Championships

The 2003 Uncle Tobys Hardcourts was a women's tennis tournament played on outdoor hard courts. It was the 7th edition of the event then known as the Uncle Tobys Hardcourts, and was a Tier III event on the 2003 WTA Tour. It took place in Gold Coast, Queensland, Australia, from 29 December 2002 through 4 January 2003. Second-seeded Nathalie Dechy won the singles title.

== Finals ==
=== Singles ===
(France) Nathalie Dechy defeated (Switzerland) Marie-Gayanay Mikaelian, 6–3, 3–6, 6–3

- It was Dechy's only singles title of her career.

=== Doubles ===
(Russia) Svetlana Kuznetsova / (United States) Martina Navratilova defeated (France) Nathalie Dechy / (France) Émilie Loit, 6–4, 6–4
