= 2007 Mondial Australian Women's Hardcourts – Singles =

Coordinates: 28.0167°S 153.4°E

Singles
- 2007 Mondial Australian Women's Hardcourts

Final
- Champion: (Russia) Dinara Safina
- Runner-up: (Switzerland) Martina Hingis
- Score: 6–3, 3–6, 7–5

Details
- Draw: 32
- Seeds: 8

Events
Singles	Doubles
← 2006 ·	Australian Hard Court Championships	· 2008 →

Lucie Šafářová was the defending champion, but chose not to participate this year.

== Seeds ==
1. (Switzerland) Martina Hingis (final)
2. (Russia) Dinara Safina (champion)
3. (Serbia) Ana Ivanovic (quarterfinals)
4. (Germany) Anna-Lena Grönefeld (first round)
5. (Israel) Shahar Pe'er (semifinals)
6. (China) Li Na (second round)
7. (Slovenia) Katarina Srebotnik (second round)
8. (Japan) Ai Sugiyama (first round)

== Draw ==
=== Key ===
- Q = Qualifier
- WC = Wild card
- LL = Lucky loser
- Alt = Alternate
- SE = Special exempt
- PR = Protected ranking
- ITF = ITF entry
- JE = Junior exempt
- w/o = Walkover
- r = Retired
- d = Defaulted
- SR = Special ranking

=== Finals ===
Semifinals
1	(Switzerland) Martina Hingis	3
(Italy) Tathiana Garbin	4^{r}
5	(Israel) Shahar Pe'er	6	6^{1}	1
2	(Russia) Dinara Safina	4	7^{7}	6

Final
1	(Switzerland) Martina Hingis	3	6	5
2	(Russia) Dinara Safina	6	3	7

=== Top half ===
First round
1	(Switzerland) M Hingis	6	6
(Austria) S Bammer	0	2
(Russia) E Bovina	2	7^{7}	1
WC	(Australia) N Pratt	6	6^{4}	6
(Colombia) C Castaño	6	6
WC	(Australia) S Golds	3	4
Q	(Czech Republic) S Záhlavová	0	4
6	(China) N Li	6	6
4	(Germany) A-L Grönefeld	6^{4}	7^{7}	3
(Italy) T Garbin	7^{7}	6^{2}	6
(Czech Republic) I Benešová	6	4	2
(France) S Brémond	0	6	6
(Russia) E Vesnina	6	6
(Italy) ME Camerin	3	2
Q	(United States) V King	4	3
7	(Slovenia) K Srebotnik	6	6

Second round
1	(Switzerland) M Hingis	6	6
WC	(Australia) N Pratt	0	1
(Colombia) C Castaño	6	1	6
6	(China) N Li	4	6	2
(Italy) T Garbin	6	6
(France) S Brémond	3	1
(Russia) E Vesnina	6	6
7	(Slovenia) K Srebotnik	3	2

Quarterfinals
1	(Switzerland) M Hingis	6	6
(Colombia) C Castaño	3	1
(Italy) T Garbin	7	6
(Russia) E Vesnina	5	2

Semifinals
1	(Switzerland) M Hingis	3
(Italy) T Garbin	4^{r}

=== Bottom half ===
First round
5	(Israel) S Pe'er	6	5	6
(United States) M Shaughnessy	1	7	0
Q	(Ukraine) Y Fedak	7	6^{5}	3
(Russia) O Poutchkova	6^{3}	7	6
(Venezuela) M Sequera	6	6
(Russia) E Ivanova	4	2
Q	(Italy) R Vinci	6^{5}	1
3	(Serbia) A Ivanovic	7	6
8	(Japan) A Sugiyama	6^{4}	4
WC	(Australia) S Ferguson	7	6
(China) S Peng	7	2	1
(Australia) S Stosur	5	6	6
(Russia) M Kirilenko	6	6
(Italy) F Pennetta	1	2
(Russia) E Likhovtseva	3	2
2	(Russia) D Safina	6	6

Second round
5	(Israel) S Pe'er	6	6
(Russia) O Poutchkova	3	2
(Venezuela) M Sequera	1	2
3	(Serbia) A Ivanovic	6	6
WC	(Australia) S Ferguson	3	4
(Australia) S Stosur	6	6
(Russia) M Kirilenko	2	5
2	(Russia) D Safina	6	7

Quarterfinals
5	(Israel) S Pe'er	5	6	6
3	(Serbia) A Ivanovic	7	4	4
(Australia) S Stosur	6^{4}	3
2	(Russia) D Safina	7	6

Semifinals
5	(Israel) S Pe'er	6	6^{1}	1
2	(Russia) D Safina	4	7	6
