= 2008 Regions Morgan Keegan Championships – Doubles =

Doubles
- 2008 Regions Morgan Keegan Championships and the Cellular South Cup

Final
- Champions: (India) Mahesh Bhupathi (The Bahamas) Mark Knowles
- Runners-up: (Thailand) Sanchai Ratiwatana (Thailand) Sonchat Ratiwatana
- Score: 7–6^{(7–5)}, 6–2

Events
Singles	men	women
Doubles	men	women
- Regions Morgan Keegan Championships Cellular South Cup

Eric Butorac and Jamie Murray were the defending champions. They were both present but did not compete together.

Butorac partnered with Todd Perry, but lost in the first round to Scott Lipsky and David Martin.

Murray partnered with Max Mirnyi, but lost in the first round to Thomas Johansson and Robert Lindstedt.

Mahesh Bhupathi and Mark Knowles won in the final 7–6^{(7–5)}, 6–2, against Sanchai Ratiwatana and Sonchat Ratiwatana.

== Seeds ==
1. (India) Mahesh Bhupathi / (The Bahamas) Mark Knowles (champions)
2. (Sweden) Jonas Björkman / (Zimbabwe) Kevin Ullyett (first round)
3. (Belarus) Max Mirnyi / (United Kingdom) Jamie Murray (first round)
4. (Brazil) Marcelo Melo / (Brazil) André Sá (semifinals)

== Draw ==
Key

- Q = Qualifier
- WC = Wild card
- LL = Lucky loser
- Alt = Alternate
- ITF = ITF entry
- PR = Protected ranking
- SR = Special ranking
- SE = Special exempt
- JE = Junior exempt
- JR = Junior Accelerator Programme entrant
- CO = College Accelerator Programme entrant
- NG = Next Gen Accelerator Program entrant
- w/o = Walkover
- r = Retired
- d = Defaulted

=== Draw ===
First round
1	(India) M Bhupathi (The Bahamas) M Knowles	6	6
WC	(United States) J Isner (United States) D Young	4	2
(Russia) I Kunitsyn (United States) J Thomas	7	6
(India) R Bopanna (Israel) D Sela	5	4
3	(Belarus) M Mirnyi (United Kingdom) J Murray	6	4	[7]
(Sweden) T Johansson (Sweden) R Lindstedt	1	6	[10]
WC	(United States) A Kuznetsov (United States) R Sweeting	4	6	[10]
(South Africa) C Haggard (Austria) J Melzer	7	4	[12]
(United States) R Ram (United States) B Reynolds	6	0	[10]
(United States) S Querrey (United States) V Spadea	3	6	[12]
(Russia) M Safin (Czech Republic) R Štěpánek
4	(Brazil) M Melo (Brazil) A Sá	w/o
(United States) E Butorac (Australia) T Perry	6^{2}	6	[7]
(United States) S Lipsky (United States) D Martin	7^{7}	3	[10]
(Thailand) S Ratiwatana (Thailand) S Ratiwatana	3	7^{7}	[11]
2	(Sweden) J Björkman (Zimbabwe) K Ullyett	6	6^{4}	[9]

Quarterfinals
1	(India) M Bhupathi (The Bahamas) M Knowles	6	6
(Russia) I Kunitsyn (United States) J Thomas	3	2
(Sweden) T Johansson (Sweden) R Lindstedt	6^{3}	6	[6]
(South Africa) C Haggard (Austria) J Melzer	7^{7}	3	[10]
(United States) S Querrey (United States) V Spadea	1	4
4	(Brazil) M Melo (Brazil) A Sá	6	6
(United States) S Lipsky (United States) D Martin	4	5
(Thailand) S Ratiwatana (Thailand) S Ratiwatana	6	7

Semifinals
1	(India) M Bhupathi (The Bahamas) M Knowles	7^{11}	6
(South Africa) C Haggard (Austria) J Melzer	6^{9}	2
4	(Brazil) M Melo (Brazil) A Sá	3	6	[13]
(Thailand) S Ratiwatana (Thailand) S Ratiwatana	6	3	[15]

Final
1	(India) M Bhupathi (The Bahamas) M Knowles	7^{7}	6
(Thailand) S Ratiwatana (Thailand) S Ratiwatana	6^{5}	2
