= Bryanne Stewart =

Australian tennis player

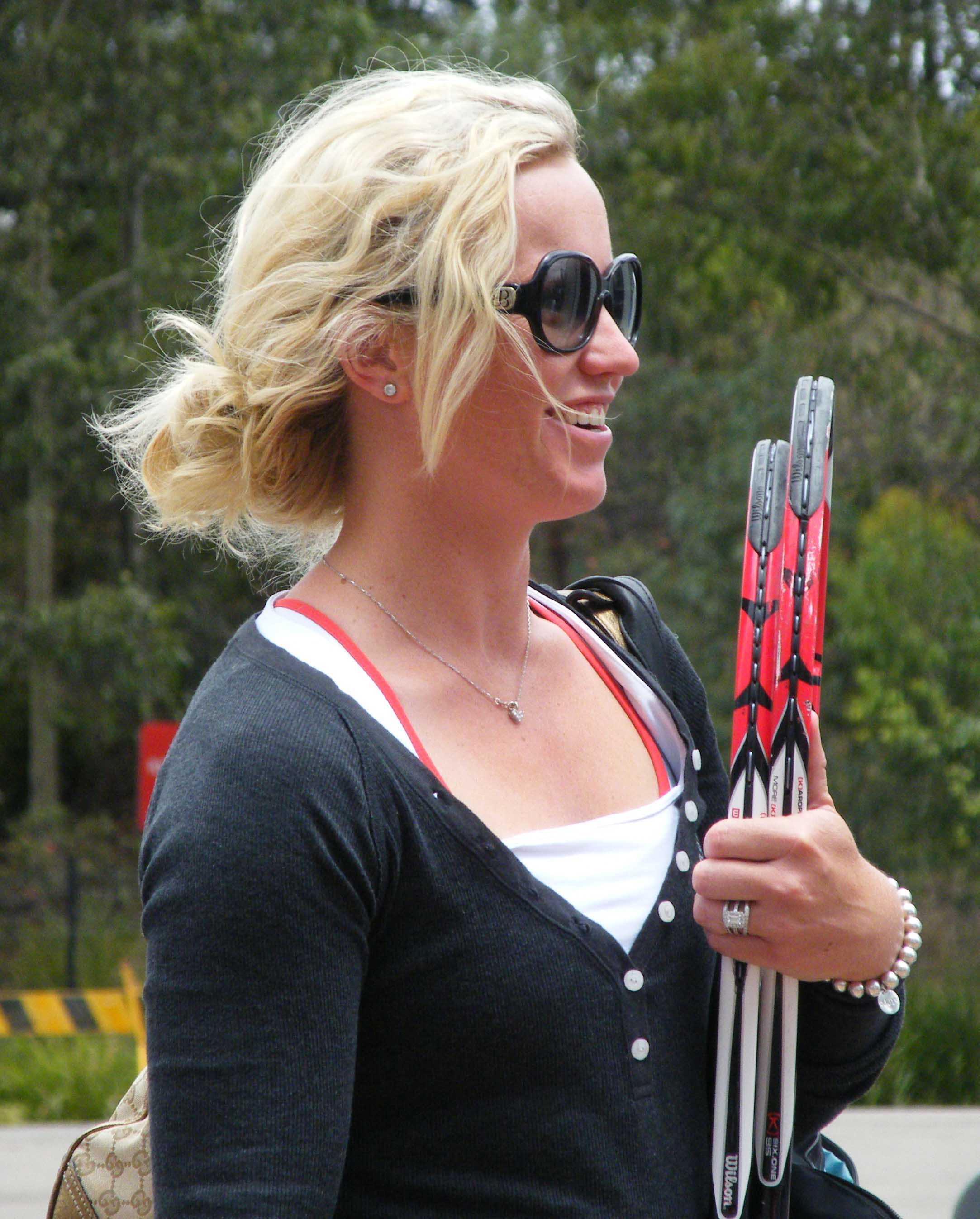
- Country (sports): Australia
- Residence: Sydney, Australia
- Born: 9 December 1979 (age 46) Sydney
- Height: 1.74 m (5 ft 8 1/2 in)
- Turned pro: 1998
- Retired: 2009
- Plays: Right (one-handed backhand)
- Prize money: $539,614

Singles
- Career record: 174–179
- Highest ranking: No. 135 (8 April 2002)

Grand Slam singles results
- Australian Open: 3R (2000)
- French Open: Q1 (2000 & 2002)
- Wimbledon: Q2 (2000 & 2002)
- US Open: Q2 (2000)

Doubles
- Career record: 243–234
- Career titles: 3 WTA, 11 ITF
- Highest ranking: No. 16 (4 July 2005)

Grand Slam doubles results
- Australian Open: 3R (2000)
- French Open: 3R (2004 & 2005)
- Wimbledon: SF (2005)
- US Open: 3R (2004)

Bryanne Stewart (born 9 December 1979) is a former professional tennis player from Australia. She has been ranked world No. 16 in doubles and won three doubles titles. In singles, she reached the third round of the Australian Open in 2000.

Her best result at a major was reaching the semifinals of the women's doubles at the 2005 Wimbledon Championships, partnering with Samantha Stosur, losing there to Cara Black and Liezel Huber.

== WTA Tour finals ==
=== Doubles: 4 (3 titles, 1 runner-up) ===
Legend
Tier I / Premier Mandatory & Premier 5
Tier II / Premier (2–0)
Tier III, IV, & V / International (1–1)

Result	Date	Tournament	Surface	Partner	Opponents	Score
Loss	Feb 2003	National Indoors, U.S.	Hard (i)	(Russia) Alina Jidkova	(Japan) Saori Obata (Japan) Akiko Morigami	1–6, 1–6
Win	Jan 2005	Sydney International, Australia	Hard	(Australia) Samantha Stosur	(Russia) Elena Dementieva (Japan) Ai Sugiyama	walkover
Win	Apr 2005	Amelia Island Championships, U.S.	Clay	(Australia) Samantha Stosur	(Czech Republic) Květa Peschke (Switzerland) Patty Schnyder	6–4, 6–2
Win	Feb 2007	U.S. National Indoors	Carpet (i)	(Australia) Nicole Pratt	(Japan) Akiko Morigami (Slovakia) Jarmila Gajdošová	7–5, 4–6, [10–5]

== ITF Circuit finals ==
=== Singles (0–3) ===
$50,000 tournaments
$25,000 tournaments
$10,000 tournaments

Result	No.	Date	Tournament	Surface	Opponent	Score
Loss	1.	13 September 1998	Kugayama, Japan	Hard	(Australia) Alicia Molik	4–6, 2–6
Loss	2.	6 May 2001	Gifu, Japan	Grass	(Australia) Alicia Molik	2–6, 3–6
Loss	3.	21 October 2001	Cairns, Australia	Hard	(Australia) Samantha Stosur	5–7, 4–6

=== Doubles (11–15) ===
Result	No	Date	Tournament	Surface	Partner	Opponents	Score
Win	1.	14 April 1997	Warwick, Australia	Grass	(Australia) Trudi Musgrave	(Australia) Kylie Moulds (Australia) Sarah Stanley	6–4, 6–0
Loss	1.	23 March 1998	Canberra, Australia	Carpet	(Australia) Melissa Beadman	(Australia) Alicia Molik (Australia) Lisa McShea	6–7^{(5)}, 7–6^{(11)}, 5–7
Loss	2.	27 April 1998	Caboolture, Australia	Clay	(Australia) Melissa Beadman	(Czech Republic) Monika Maštalířová (Australia) Lisa McShea	6–2, 6–7^{(5)}, 5–7
Loss	3.	28 June 1998	Springfield, US	Hard	(Australia) Amanda Grahame	(United States) Amanda Augustus (United States) Julie Thu	0–6, 0–6
Loss	4.	5 July 1998	Edmond, United States	Hard	(Australia) Gail Biggs	(Australia) Melissa Beadman (Australia) Siobhan Drake-Brockman	6–7, 6–7
Win	2.	3 August 1998	Lexington, US	Hard	(Australia) Amanda Grahame	(India) Nirupama Sanjeev (China) Yi Jingqian	6–4, 1–6, 6–3
Win	3.	13 September 1998	Kugayama, Japan	Hard	(Australia) Alicia Molik	(Japan) Aiko Matsuda (Japan) Yasuko Nishimata	6–1, 6–3
Win	4.	27 September 1998	Ibaraki, Japan	Hard	(Australia) Alicia Molik	(Japan) Riei Kawamata (Japan) Yoshiko Sasano	1–6, 6–3, 6–3
Win	5.	4 October 1998	Kyoto, Japan	Hard	(Australia) Alicia Molik	(Japan) Shizu Katsumi (Japan) Ayami Takase	3–6, 6–3, 6–4
Loss	5.	11 October 1998	Saga, Japan	Grass	(Australia) Evie Dominikovic	(Australia) Catherine Barclay (Australia) Alicia Molik	6–7^{(3)}, 4–6
Loss	6.	22 November 1998	Port Pirie, Australia	Hard	(Australia) Amanda Grahame	(Australia) Catherine Barclay (Australia) Trudi Musgrave	7–5, 5–7, 2–6
Win	6.	25 April 1999	Gelos, France	Clay	(Australia) Trudi Musgrave	(France) Sophie Georges (Belarus) Tatiana Poutchek	1–6, 6–4, 6–3
Win	7.	8 May 1999	Athens, Greece	Clay	(Australia) Evie Dominikovic	(South Africa) Surina De Beer (Romania) Magda Mihalache	7–5, 6–4
Loss	7.	25 July 1999	Peachtree City, US	Hard	(Australia) Annabel Ellwood	(Japan) Rika Hiraki (Japan) Nana Smith	4–6, 1–6
Loss	8.	17 October 1999	Queensland, Australia	Hard	(Australia) Alicia Molik	(Australia) Kerry-Anne Guse (Australia) Lisa McShea	1–6, 6–3, 5–7
Loss	9.	28 February 2000	Bendigo, Australia	Hard	(Australia) Trudi Musgrave	(Australia) Evie Dominikovic (Australia) Amanda Grahame	4–6, 1–6
Win	8.	26 March 2000	Stone Mountain, US	Hard	(Australia) Trudi Musgrave	(Japan) Haruka Inoue (Japan) Maiko Inoue	6–4, 2–6, 7–6
Win	9.	11 June 2000	Surbiton, United Kingdom	Grass	(Australia) Trudi Musgrave	(France) Caroline Dhenin (Italy) Francesca Lubiani	3–6, 6–3, 6–1
Loss	10.	26 March 2001	Stone Mountain, US	Hard	(Australia) Alicia Molik	(Japan) Rika Fujiwara (South Korea) Jeon Mi-ra	5–7, 3–6
Win	10.	21 October 2002	Rockhampton, Australia	Hard	(Australia) Evie Dominikovic	(Australia) Sarah Stone (Australia) Samantha Stosur	7–5, 4–6, 7–5
Loss	11.	28 October 2002	Dalby, Australia	Hard	(Australia) Evie Dominikovic	(Australia) Sarah Stone (Australia) Samantha Stosur	3–6, 3–6
Loss	12.	22 July 2003	Lexington, US	Hard	(Australia) Christina Wheeler	(Chinese Taipei) Janet Lee (United States) Jessica Lehnhoff	3–6, 4–6
Win	11.	13 October 2003	Mackay, Australia	Hard	(Australia) Evie Dominikovic	(Australia) Trudi Musgrave (United States) Abigail Spears	w/o
Loss	13.	23 November 2003	Nurioopta, Australia	Hard	(Australia) Samantha Stosur	(Australia) Lisa McShea (Australia) Trudi Musgrave	6–4, 3–6, 5–7
Loss	14.	30 November 2003	Mount Gambier, Australia	Hard	(Australia) Samantha Stosur	(United States) Jessica Lehnhoff (Australia) Christina Wheeler	5–7, 2–6
Loss	15.	21 March 2004	Orange, United States	Hard	(United States) Mashona Washington	(United States) Jennifer Hopkins (United States) Abigail Spears	3–6, 6–2, 0–6
