= Milos Raonic career statistics =

Main career statistics of tennis player Milos Raonic

This is a list of the main career statistics of tennis player Milos Raonic.

Career finals
Discipline	Type	Won	Lost	Total	WR
Singles	Grand Slam	–	1	1	0.00
Singles	ATP Finals	–	–	–	–
Singles	ATP 1000	–	4	4	0.00
Singles	ATP 500	1	6	7	0.14
Singles	ATP 250	7	4	11	0.64
Singles	Olympics	–	–	–	–
Singles	Total	8	15	23	0.35
Doubles	Grand Slam	–	–	–	–
Doubles	ATP Finals	–	–	–	–
Doubles	ATP 1000	–	–	–	–
Doubles	ATP 500	–	–	–	–
Doubles	ATP 250	–	1	1	0.00
Doubles	Olympics	–	–	–	–
Doubles	Total	0	1	1	0.00

== Singles performance timeline ==
Key
W	F	SF	QF	#R	RR	Q#	P#	DNQ	A	Z#	PO	G	S	B	NMS	NTI	P	NH

(W) winner; (F) finalist; (SF) semifinalist; (QF) quarterfinalist; (#R) rounds 4, 3, 2, 1; (RR) round-robin stage; (Q#) qualification round; (P#) preliminary round; (DNQ) did not qualify; (A) absent; (Z#) Davis/Fed Cup Zonal Group (with number indication) or (PO) play-off; (G) gold, (S) silver or (B) bronze Olympic/Paralympic medal; (NMS) not a Masters tournament; (NTI) not a Tier I tournament; (P) postponed; (NH) not held; (SR) strike rate (events won / competed); (W–L) win–loss record.
To avoid confusion and double counting, these charts are updated at the conclusion of a tournament or when the player's participation has ended.

Tournament	2008	2009	2010	2011	2012	2013	2014	2015	2016	2017	2018	2019	2020	2021	2022	2023	2024	SR	W–L	Win%
Grand Slam tournaments
Australian Open	A	A	A	4R	3R	4R	3R	QF	SF	QF	1R	QF	QF	4R	A	A	1R	0 / 12	34–12	76%
French Open	A	A	A	1R	3R	3R	QF	A	4R	4R	A	A	A	A	A	A	A	0 / 6	14–6	70%
Wimbledon	A	A	A	2R	2R	2R	SF	3R	F	QF	QF	4R	NH	A	A	2R	A	0 / 10	28–10	74%
US Open	A	A	1R	A	4R	4R	4R	3R	2R	A	4R	A	2R	A	A	1R	A	0 / 9	16–9	64%
Win–loss	0–0	0–0	0–1	4–3	8–4	9–4	14–4	8–3	15–4	11–3	7–3	7–2	5–2	3–1	0–0	1–2	0–1	0 / 37	92–37	72%
Year-end championships
ATP Finals	did not qualify						RR	DNQ	SF	did not qualify								0 / 2	2–4	33%
National representation
Summer Olympics	A	not held			2R	not held			A	not held				A	not held		1R	0 / 2	1–2	33%
Davis Cup	A	A	AZ1	PO	1R	SF	PO	1R	A	A	PO	A	NH	A	A	QF	A	0 / 4	17–5	77%
ATP 1000 tournaments
Indian Wells Open	A	A	A	3R	3R	4R	QF	SF	F	A	SF	SF	NH	A	A	A	2R	0 / 9	24–8	75%
Miami Open	A	A	A	2R	3R	3R	QF	4R	QF	3R	QF	3R	NH	4R	A	A	A	0 / 10	16–7	70%
Monte-Carlo Masters	A	A	A	3R	1R	2R	QF	QF	QF	A	3R	A	NH	A	A	A	A	0 / 7	12–6	67%
Madrid Open	A	A	A	1R	2R	2R	3R	QF	QF	3R	3R	A	NH	A	A	A	A	0 / 8	11–8	58%
Italian Open	A	A	A	1R	1R	1R	SF	A	2R	QF	A	A	2R	A	A	A	A	0 / 7	7–7	50%
Canadian Open	Q1	1R	1R	A	QF	F	QF	2R	QF	2R	2R	2R	NH	A	A	3R	A	0 / 11	14–11	56%
Cincinnati Open	A	A	A	A	QF	3R	SF	1R	SF	A	QF	A	F	A	A	A	A	0 / 7	19–7	73%
Shanghai Masters	NH	A	A	2R	2R	3R	2R	3R	3R	A	1R	A	not held			A	A	0 / 7	7–7	50%
Paris Masters	A	A	A	1R	3R	3R	F	A	SF	A	2R	2R	SF	A	A	A	A	0 / 8	15–6	69%
Win–loss	0–0	0–1	0–1	5–7	9–8	14–8	21–9	12–7	24–8	4–3	15–6	6–4	10–3	2–1	0–0	2–1	1–0	0 / 74	125–67	65%
Career statistics
	2008	2009	2010	2011	2012	2013	2014	2015	2016	2017	2018	2019	2020	2021	2022	2023	2024	SR	W–L	Win %
Tournaments	0	1	4	19	23	23	20	16	19	14	18	13	10	4	0	4	6	Career total: 194		
Titles	0	0	0	1	2	2	1	1	1	0	0	0	0	0	0	0	0	Career total: 8		
Finals	0	0	0	2	4	4	3	2	4	2	1	0	1	0	0	0	0	Career total: 23		
Hardcourt win–loss	0–0	0–1	4–4	19–11	33–11	36–12	33–13	25–12	32–11	14–5	19–12	14–12	22–8	7–5	0–0	3–2	3–2	8 / 131	264–121	69%
Clay win–loss	0–0	0–0	0–2	9–6	7–5	8–6	11–5	4–2	10–4	11–5	4–1	0–0	1–1	0–0	0–0	0–0	0–1	0 / 36	65–38	63%
Grass win–loss	0–0	0–0	0–0	3–2	5–4	1–3	5–2	4–2	10–2	4–2	9–2	8–2	0–0	0–0	0–0	2–2	3–2	0 / 27	54–25	68%
Overall win–loss	0–0	0–1	4–6	31–19	45–20	45–21	49–20	33–16	52–17	29–12	32–15	22–14	23–9	7–5	0–0	5–4	6–5	8 / 194	383–184	68%
Win %	–	0%	40%	62%	69%	68%	71%	67%	75%	71%	68%	61%	72%	58%	–	56%	55%	Career total: 68%		
Year-end ranking	915	373	156	31	13	11	8	14	3	24	18	31	14	70	–	317	238	$ 20,764,512		

== Grand Slam tournament finals ==
=== Singles: 1 (1 runner-up) ===
Result	Year	Chamionship	Surface	Opponent	Score
Loss	2016	Wimbledon	Grass	(United Kingdom) Andy Murray	4–6, 6–7^{(3–7)}, 6–7^{(2–7)}

== Other significant finals ==
=== Masters 1000 finals ===
==== Singles: 4 (4 runner-ups) ====
Result	Year	Tournament	Surface	Opponent	Score
Loss	2013	Canadian Open	Hard	(Spain) Rafael Nadal	2–6, 2–6
Loss	2014	Paris Masters	Hard (i)	(Serbia) Novak Djokovic	2–6, 3–6
Loss	2016	Indian Wells Open	Hard	(Serbia) Novak Djokovic	2–6, 0–6
Loss	2020	Cincinnati Open	Hard	(Serbia) Novak Djokovic	6–1, 3–6, 4–6

== ATP career finals ==
=== Singles: 23 (8 titles, 15 runner-ups) ===
Legend Grand Slam (0–1) ATP Finals (0–0) ATP 1000 (0–4) ATP 500 (1–6) ATP 250 (7–4)	Finals by surface Hard (8–11) Clay (0–1) Grass (0–3)	Finals by setting Outdoor (3–12) Indoor (5–3)

Result	W–L	Date	Tournament	Tier	Surface	Opponent	Score
Win	1–0	Feb 2011	Pacific Coast Championships, United States	ATP 250	Hard (i)	(Spain) Fernando Verdasco	7–6^{(8–6)}, 7–6^{(7–5)}
Loss	1–1	Feb 2011	U.S. Indoor Championships, United States	ATP 500	Hard (i)	(United States) Andy Roddick	6–7^{(7–9)}, 7–6^{(13–11)}, 5–7
Win	2–1	Jan 2012	Chennai Open, India	ATP 250	Hard	(Serbia) Janko Tipsarević	6–7^{(4–7)}, 7–6^{(7–4)}, 7–6^{(7–4)}
Win	3–1	Feb 2012	Pacific Coast Championships, United States (2)	ATP 250	Hard (i)	(Uzbekistan) Denis Istomin	7–6^{(7–3)}, 6–2
Loss	3–2	Feb 2012	U.S. Indoor Championships, United States	ATP 500	Hard (i)	(Austria) Jürgen Melzer	5–7, 6–7^{(4–7)}
Loss	3–3	Oct 2012	Japan Open, Japan	ATP 500	Hard	(Japan) Kei Nishikori	6–7^{(5–7)}, 6–3, 0–6
Win	4–3	Feb 2013	Pacific Coast Championships, United States (3)	ATP 250	Hard (i)	(Germany) Tommy Haas	6–4, 6–3
Loss	4–4	Aug 2013	Canadian Open, Canada	ATP 1000	Hard	(Spain) Rafael Nadal	2–6, 2–6
Win	5–4	Sep 2013	Thailand Open, Thailand	ATP 250	Hard (i)	(Czech Republic) Tomáš Berdych	7–6^{(7–4)}, 6–3
Loss	5–5	Oct 2013	Japan Open, Japan	ATP 500	Hard	(Argentina) Juan Martín del Potro	6–7^{(5–7)}, 5–7
Win	6–5	Aug 2014	Washington Open, United States	ATP 500	Hard	(Canada) Vasek Pospisil	6–1, 6–4
Loss	6–6	Oct 2014	Japan Open, Japan	ATP 500	Hard	(Japan) Kei Nishikori	6–7^{(5–7)}, 6–4, 4–6
Loss	6–7	Nov 2014	Paris Masters, France	ATP 1000	Hard (i)	(Serbia) Novak Djokovic	2–6, 3–6
Loss	6–8	Jan 2015	Brisbane International, Australia	ATP 250	Hard	(Switzerland) Roger Federer	4–6, 7–6^{(7–2)}, 4–6
Win	7–8	Sep 2015	St. Petersburg Open, Russia	ATP 250	Hard (i)	(Portugal) João Sousa	6–3, 3–6, 6–3
Win	8–8	Jan 2016	Brisbane International, Australia	ATP 250	Hard	(Switzerland) Roger Federer	6–4, 6–4
Loss	8–9	Mar 2016	Indian Wells Open, United States	ATP 1000	Hard	(Serbia) Novak Djokovic	2–6, 0–6
Loss	8–10	Jun 2016	Queen's Club Championships, United Kingdom	ATP 500	Grass	(United Kingdom) Andy Murray	7–6^{(7–5)}, 4–6, 3–6
Loss	8–11	Jul 2016	Wimbledon, United Kingdom	Grand Slam	Grass	(United Kingdom) Andy Murray	4–6, 6–7^{(3–7)}, 6–7^{(2–7)}
Walkover	8–12	Feb 2017	Delray Beach Open, United States	ATP 250	Hard	(United States) Jack Sock	Walkover
Loss	8–13	May 2017	Istanbul Open, Turkey	ATP 250	Clay	(Croatia) Marin Čilić	6–7^{(3–7)}, 3–6
Loss	8–14	Jun 2018	Stuttgart Open, Germany	ATP 250	Grass	(Switzerland) Roger Federer	4–6, 6–7^{(3–7)}
Loss	8–15	Aug 2020	Cincinnati Open, United States	ATP 1000	Hard	(Serbia) Novak Djokovic	6–1, 3–6, 4–6

=== Doubles: 1 (1 runner-up) ===
Legend Grand Slam (0–0) ATP Finals (0–0) ATP 1000 (0–0) ATP 500 (0–0) ATP 250 (0–1)	Finals by surface Hard (0–0) Clay (0–0) Grass (0–1)	Finals by setting Outdoor (0–1) Indoor (0–0)

Result	W–L	Date	Tournament	Tier	Surface	Partner	Opponents	Score
Loss	0–1	Jun 2011	Halle Open, Germany	ATP 250	Grass	(Netherlands) Robin Haase	(India) Rohan Bopanna (Pakistan) Aisam-ul-Haq Qureshi	6–7^{(8–10)}, 6–3, [9–11]

== ATP Challenger and ITF Futures finals ==
=== Singles: 8 (4–4) ===
Legend ATP Challenger Tour (0–1) ITF Futures Tour (4–3)	Finals by Surface Hard (4–4) Clay (0–0) Grass (0–0) Carpet (0–0)

Result	W–L	Date	Tournament	Tier	Surface	Opponent	Score
Loss	0–1	Aug 2010	Granby Challenger, Canada	Challenger	Hard	(Germany) Tobias Kamke	3–6, 6–7^{(4–7)}
Loss	0–1	Mar 2008	F3 Sherbrooke, Canada	Futures	Hard	(Italy) Enrico Iannuzzi	5–7, 6–7^{(4–7)}
Win	1–1	Mar 2009	F2 Montreal, Canada	Futures	Hard	(France) Grégoire Burquier	6–3, 6–4
Loss	1–2	Aug 2009	F1 Nonthaburi, Thailand	Futures	Hard	(Thailand) Kittiphong Wachiramanowong	6–3, 4–6, 3–6
Win	2–2	Aug 2009	F2 Nonthaburi, Thailand	Futures	Hard	(France) Laurent Rochette	6–7^{(1–7)}, 7–6^{(7–2)}, 7–5
Loss	2–3	Mar 2010	F3 Sherbrooke, Canada	Futures	Hard	(Canada) Vasek Pospisil	4–6, 6–4, 3–6
Win	3–3	Apr 2010	F2 Daegu, South Korea	Futures	Hard	(Japan) Hiroki Kondo	6–1, 6–1
Win	4–3	May 2010	F4 Gimcheon, South Korea	Futures	Hard	(Austria) Max Raditschnigg	6–4, 6–4

=== Doubles: 9 (6–3) ===
Legend ATP Challenger Tour (1–0) ITF Futures Tour (5–3)	Finals by Surface Hard (4–3) Clay (2–0) Grass (0–0) Carpet (0–0)

Result	W–L	Date	Tournament	Tier	Surface	Partner	Opponents	Score
Win	1–0	Nov 2008	Rimouski Challenger, Canada	Challenger	Hard	(Canada) Vasek Pospisil	(Denmark) Kristian Pless (Sweden) Michael Ryderstedt	5–7, 6–4, [10–6]
Win	1–0	Mar 2008	F1 Gatineau, Canada	Futures	Hard	(Canada) Milan Pokrajac	(United States) Christopher Klingemann (Germany) Thomas Schoeck	7–6^{(7–2)}, 6–7^{(3–7)}, [10–8]
Loss	1–1	Mar 2008	F2 Montreal, Canada	Futures	Hard	(Canada) Milan Pokrajac	(United States) Travis Rettenmaier (United States) Rylan Rizza	6–7^{(5–7)}, 6–7^{(4–7)}
Loss	1–2	Feb 2009	F2 Zagreb, Croatia	Futures	Hard	(Canada) Érik Chvojka	(Romania) Victor Ioniță (Russia) Denis Matsukevich	4–6, 5–7
Win	2–2	Apr 2009	F7 Mobile, US	Futures	Hard	(Canada) Philip Bester	(United States) Lester Cook (Philippines) Treat Huey	6–3, 1–6, [10–5]
Win	3–2	Jun 2009	F3 Koper, Slovenia	Futures	Clay	(Ukraine) Denys Molchanov	(Czech Republic) Roman Jebavý (Czech Republic) David Novak	7–5, 5–7, [10–5]
Win	4–2	Jul 2009	F17 Peoria, US	Futures	Clay	(Canada) Vasek Pospisil	(Australia) Matt Reid (United States) Denis Zivkovic	6–3, 6–4
Win	5–2	Aug 2009	F1 Nonthaburi, Thailand	Futures	Hard	(Austria) Nikolaus Moser	(Japan) Satoshi Iwabuchi (Japan) Gouichi Motomura	0–6, 7–6^{(7–2)}, [10–3]
Loss	5–3	Mar 2010	F3 Sherbrooke, Canada	Futures	Hard	(Canada) Vasek Pospisil	(United States) Cory Parr (United States) Todd Paul	4–6, 4–6

== Wins over top-10 opponents ==
Raonic has a 31–71 record against players who were, at the time the match was played, ranked in the top 10. He has registered top 10 victories in consecutive matches during four tournaments: 2012 Chennai Open, 2012 Japan Open, 2013 Thailand Open, and 2014 Paris Masters. He has also registered top 10 wins in consecutive matches once spanning two tournaments;he beat Fernando Verdasco in the final of the 2011 Pacific Coast Championships and again in the first match of the U.S. National Indoor Tennis Championships the following week.

Wins over top-10 opponents per season
Season	2008	2009	2010	2011	2012	2013	2014	2015	2016	2017	2018	2019	2020	2021	2022	2023	Total
Wins	0	0	0	3	6	3	3	2	8	1	1	1	2	0	0	1	31

#	Player	Rank	Event	Surface	Rd	Score	MRR
2011
1.	(Russia) Mikhail Youzhny	10	Australian Open, Australia	Hard	3R	6–4, 7–5, 4–6, 6–4	152
2.	(Spain) Fernando Verdasco	9	Pacific Coast Championships, United States	Hard (i)	F	7–6^{(8–6)}, 7–6^{(7–5)}	84
3.	(Spain) Fernando Verdasco	9	National Indoors, United States	Hard (i)	1R	6–4, 3–6, 7–6^{(7–5)}	59
2012
4.	(Spain) Nicolás Almagro	10	Maharashtra Open, India	Hard	SF	6–4, 6–4	31
5.	(Serbia) Janko Tipsarević	9	Maharashtra Open, India	Hard	F	6–7^{(4–7)}, 7–6^{(7–4)}, 7–6^{(7–4)}	31
6.	(United Kingdom) Andy Murray	4	Barcelona Open, Spain	Clay	QF	6–4, 7–6^{(7–3)}	25
7.	(Czech Republic) Tomáš Berdych	7	Cincinnati Masters, United States	Hard	3R	6–4, 2–6, 6–2	19
8.	(Serbia) Janko Tipsarević	9	Japan Open, Japan	Hard	QF	6–7^{(5–7)}, 6–2, 7–6^{(9–7)}	15
9.	(United Kingdom) Andy Murray	3	Japan Open, Japan	Hard	SF	6–3, 6–7^{(5–7)}, 7–6^{(7–4)}	15
2013
10.	(Argentina) Juan Martín del Potro	7	Canadian Open, Canada	Hard	3R	7–5, 6–4	13
11.	(France) Richard Gasquet	9	Thailand Open, Thailand	Hard (i)	SF	3–6, 7–5, 6–4	11
12.	(Czech Republic) Tomáš Berdych	6	Thailand Open, Thailand	Hard (i)	F	7–6^{(7–4)}, 6–3	11
2014
13.	(United Kingdom) Andy Murray	6	Indian Wells Masters, United States	Hard	4R	4–6, 7–5, 6–3	11
14.	(Switzerland) Roger Federer	2	Paris Masters, France	Hard (i)	QF	7–6^{(7–5)}, 7–5	10
15.	(Czech Republic) Tomáš Berdych	5	Paris Masters, France	Hard (i)	SF	6–3, 3–6, 7–5	10
2015
16.	(Japan) Kei Nishikori	5	Brisbane International, Australia	Hard	SF	6–7^{(4–7)}, 7–6^{(7–4)}, 7–6^{(7–4)}	8
17.	(Spain) Rafael Nadal	3	Indian Wells Open, United States	Hard	QF	4–6, 7–6^{(12–10)}, 7–5	6
2016
18.	(Switzerland) Roger Federer	3	Brisbane International, Australia	Hard	F	6–4, 6–4	14
19.	(Switzerland) Stan Wawrinka	4	Australian Open, Australia	Hard	4R	6–4, 6–3, 5–7, 4–6, 6–3	14
20.	(Czech Republic) Tomáš Berdych	7	Indian Wells Masters, United States	Hard	4R	6–4, 7–6^{(9–7)}	14
21.	(France) Jo-Wilfried Tsonga	7	Madrid Open, Spain	Clay	3R	6–4, 6–4	10
22.	(Switzerland) Roger Federer	3	Wimbledon, London, United Kingdom	Grass	SF	6–3, 6–7^{(3–7)}, 4–6, 7–5, 6–3	7
23.	(Austria) Dominic Thiem	9	Cincinnati Masters, United States	Hard	QF	6–3, 6–4	6
24.	(France) Gaël Monfils	6	ATP Finals, United Kingdom	Hard (i)	RR	6–3, 6–4	4
25.	(Austria) Dominic Thiem	9	ATP Finals, United Kingdom	Hard (i)	RR	7–6^{(7–5)}, 6–3	4
2017
26.	(Spain) Rafael Nadal	9	Brisbane International, Australia	Hard	QF	4–6, 6–3, 6–4	3
2018
27.	(Bulgaria) Grigor Dimitrov	4	Madrid Open, Spain	Clay	2R	7–5, 3–6, 6–3	24
2019
28.	(Germany) Alexander Zverev	4	Australian Open, Australia	Hard	4R	6–1, 6–1, 7–6^{(7–5)}	17
2020
29.	(Greece) Stefanos Tsitsipas	6	Australian Open, Australia	Hard	3R	7–5, 6–4, 7–6^{(7–2)}	35
30.	(Greece) Stefanos Tsitsipas	6	Cincinnati Masters, United States	Hard	SF	7–6^{(7–5)}, 6–3	30
2023
31.	(United States) Frances Tiafoe	10	Canadian Open, Canada	Hard	1R	6–7^{(12–14)}, 7–6^{(7–4)}, 6–3	545

== Grand Slam seedings ==
Not seeded at all, or not seeded inside the top 10 Seeded 10–4 Seeded no. 3 Seeded no. 2 Seeded no. 1

Year	Australian Open	French Open	Wimbledon	US Open
2010	did not play	did not play	did not play	qualifier
2011	qualifier	26th	31st	did not play
2012	23rd	19th	21st	15th
2013	13th	14th	17th	10th
2014	11th	8th	8th	5th
2015	8th	did not play	7th	10th
2016	13th	8th	6th	5th
2017	3rd	5th	6th	did not play
2018	22nd	did not play	13th	25th
2019	16th	did not play	15th	did not play
2020	32nd	did not play	tournament cancelled*	25th
2021	14th	did not play	did not play	did not play
2022	did not play	did not play	did not play	did not play
2023	did not play	did not play	PR	PR
2024	PR	did not play	did not play	did not play

* Due to the COVID-19 pandemic, the 2020 Wimbledon Championships of the tournament was cancelled.

== National representation ==
=== Davis Cup (19–6) ===
Overall, Raonic has 19 match wins in 25 Davis Cup matches (17–5 in singles; 2–1 in doubles). He is one of the most successful players in Canadian Davis Cup history, having achieved the sixth most match wins overall and is tied with Sébastien Lareau for the most singles match wins.

Group membership Finals / World Group (8–3) World Group play-offs (6–1) American Group I (5–2)	Matches by type Singles (17–5) Doubles (2–1)	Matches by surface Hard (14–3) Clay (5–3)	Matches by venue Canada (13–2) Away (5–4) Neutral (1–0)

Davis Cup match summary representing Canada
Round	Date	Opponent	Score	Venue	Surface	Match	Opponent	Rubber score
American Group I
SF	5–7 Mar 2010	Colombia	1–4	Bogotá	Clay	Singles 2	Santiago Giraldo	5–7, 6–4, 4–6, 4–6
SF	5–7 Mar 2010	Colombia	1–4	Bogotá	Clay	Doubles (w/ Nestor)	Falla / Cabal	7–6^{(7–4)}, 7–6^{(7–3)}, 5–7, 6–3
SF	5–7 Mar 2010	Colombia	1–4	Bogotá	Clay	Singles 5 (dead)	Juan Sebastián Cabal	7–6^{(8–6)}, 3–6, 4–6
2R PO	17–19 Sep 2010	Dominican Republic	5–0	Toronto	Hard	Singles 2	Víctor Estrella Burgos	5–7, 6–2, 3–6, 7–6^{(7–3)}, 9–7
QF	4–6 Mar 2011	Mexico	4–1	Metepec	Clay	Singles 2	Manuel Sánchez	6–2, 6–2, 6–1
QF	4–6 Mar 2011	Mexico	4–1	Metepec	Clay	Doubles (w/ Pospisil)	Barriga / Varela	4–6, 6–3, 6–4, 6–4
QF	4–6 Mar 2011	Mexico	4–1	Metepec	Clay	Singles 4	Daniel Garza	7–5, 6–3, 6–2
World Group
PO	16–18 Sep 2011	Israel	3–2	Ramat HaSharon	Hard	Singles 2	Amir Weintraub	7–5, 5–7, 3–6, 1–6
1R	10–12 Feb 2012	France	1–4	Vancouver	Hard (i)	Singles 2	Julien Benneteau	6–2, 6–4, 7–5
1R	10–12 Feb 2012	France	1–4	Vancouver	Hard (i)	Doubles (w/ Nestor)	Benneteau / Llodra	6–7^{(1–7)}, 6–7^{(2–7)}, 3–6
PO	14–16 Sep 2012	South Africa	4–1	Montreal	Hard	Singles 2	Nikala Scholtz	7–5, 6–4, 7–5
PO	14–16 Sep 2012	South Africa	4–1	Montreal	Hard	Singles 4	Izak van der Merwe	6–2, 6–2, 6–4
1R	1–3 Feb 2013	Spain	3–2	Vancouver	Hard (i)	Singles 1	Albert Ramos	6–7^{(5–7)}, 6–4, 6–4, 6–4
1R	1–3 Feb 2013	Spain	3–2	Vancouver	Hard (i)	Singles 4	Guillermo García López	6–3, 6–4, 6–2
QF	5–7 Apr 2013	Italy	3–1	Vancouver	Hard (i)	Singles 2	Fabio Fognini	6–4, 7–6^{(7–4)}, 7–5
QF	5–7 Apr 2013	Italy	3–1	Vancouver	Hard (i)	Singles 4	Andreas Seppi	6–4, 6–3, 3–6, 7–5
SF	13–15 Sep 2013	Serbia	2–3	Belgrade	Clay (i)	Singles 2	Janko Tipsarević	5–7, 6–3, 3–6, 6–3, 10–8
SF	13–15 Sep 2013	Serbia	2–3	Belgrade	Clay (i)	Singles 4	Novak Djokovic	6–7^{(1–7)}, 2–6, 2–6
PO	12–14 Sep 2014	Colombia	3–2	Halifax	Hard (i)	Singles 2	Alejandro González	6–3, 6–3, 6–2
PO	12–14 Sep 2014	Colombia	3–2	Halifax	Hard (i)	Singles 4	Santiago Giraldo	6–1, 7–6^{(7–2)}, 7–5
1R	6–8 Mar 2015	Japan	3–2	Vancouver	Hard (i)	Singles 1	Tatsuma Ito	6–2, 6–1, 6–2
1R	6–8 Mar 2015	Japan	3–2	Vancouver	Hard (i)	Singles 4	Kei Nishikori	6–3, 3–6, 4–6, 6–2, 4–6
PO	14–16 Sep 2018	Netherlands	3–1	Toronto	Hard (i)	Singles 1	Thiemo de Bakker	6–3, 6–2, 6–2
PO	14–16 Sep 2018	Netherlands	3–1	Toronto	Hard (i)	Singles 4	Scott Griekspoor	7–6^{(7–4)}, 6–3, 6–4
Finals
QF	21 Nov 2023	Finland	1–2	Málaga	Hard (i)	Singles 1	Patrick Kaukovalta	6–3, 7–5

=== Olympics (1–1) ===
In the second round of the singles competition at the London 2012 Olympics, Raonic lost to French player Jo-Wilfried Tsonga 3–6, 6–3, 23–25, breaking three Olympic tennis records. The match holds the records for the most games played in a best-of-three sets match (66 games) and the most games played in a single set (48 games) in Olympic history. At the time, it was the longest Olympic match by time played (3 hours 57 minutes), but this record was broken three days later in the semifinal match between Roger Federer and Juan Martín del Potro (4 hours 26 minutes).

Singles Olympics match summary
Year	Round	Opponent	Score
2012	1R	Tatsuma Ito (JPN)	6–3, 6–4
2012	2R	Jo-Wilfried Tsonga (FRA)	3–6, 6–3, 23–25

== Service and return statistics ==
The tables below summarize the performance and ATP ranking of Raonic in several service and return metrics.

Service game statistics
	2011		2012		2013		2014		2015		2016		2017		2018		2019		2020	
	% or #	Rank	% or #	Rank	% or #	Rank	% or #	Rank	% or #	Rank	% or #	Rank	% or #	Rank	% or #	Rank	% or #	Rank	% or #	Rank
Aces	637	5	1002	2	883	2	1107	2	743	5	874	4	566	8	788	3	697	4	529	1
1st serve	64%	14	62%	23	63%	23	61%	22	64%	14	64%	7	64%	n/a	63%	19	63%	n/a	64%	23
1st serve points won	79%	1	82%	1	82%	1	83%	2	81%	2	80%	4	79%	n/a	83%	1	84%	n/a	83%	1
2nd serve points won	53%	16	56%	8	53%	14	54%	10	58%	3	55%	5	56%	n/a	57%	3	57%	n/a	56%	4
Service game won	88%	3	93%	1	91%	1	90%	4	94%	2	91%	3	90%	n/a	91%	3	92%	n/a	94%	1
Break points saved	66%	4	74%	1	68%	5	69%	8	78%	2	69%	4	66%	n/a	63%	20	69%	n/a	76%	2

Return game statistics
	2011		2012		2013		2014		2015		2016		2017		2018		2019		2020	
	%	Rank	%	Rank	%	Rank	%	Rank	%	Rank	%	Rank	%	Rank	%	Rank	%	Rank	%	Rank
1st serve return points won	26%	63	26%	47	28%	43	27%	35	24%	46	28%	31	28%	n/a	27%	40	27%	n/a	27%	50
2nd serve return points won	47%	60	45%	46	44%	56	45%	44	44%	46	49%	28	49%	n/a	46%	47	45%	n/a	49%	47
Break points converted	40%	37	39%	36	33%	56	39%	22	33%	47	35%	39	35%	n/a	37%	38	31%	n/a	36%	45
Return games won	17%	64	15%	47	16%	55	16%	44	12%	48	18%	38	35%	n/a	16%	48	14%	n/a	18%	51

* Statistics correct as of 30 November 2020.

== Coaches ==
Raonic has had 15 coaches. Of these, twelve played professional tennis before coaching (Guillaume Marx, Frédéric Niemeyer, Galo Blanco, Ivan Ljubičić, Carlos Moyá, John McEnroe, Richard Krajicek, Mark Knowles, Dušan Vemić Goran Ivanišević, Fabrice Santoro and Mario Tudor) while three are career coaches (Casey Curtis, Riccardo Piatti and Javier Piles).

Summary of junior and professional coaches
Coach	Period of coaching		Raonic's rank		
Coach	Start	End	Start	Peak	End
Casey Curtis	1999	fall 2007	n/a	915–937	915–937
Guillaume Marx	fall 2007	November 19, 2009	915–937	369	377
Frédéric Niemeyer	November 19, 2009	October 11, 2010	377	155	155
Galo Blanco	September 27, 2010	May 11, 2013	237	13	14
Ivan Ljubičić	June 7, 2013	November 26, 2015	16	4	14
Riccardo Piatti	December 1, 2013	November 14, 2017	11	3	24
Carlos Moyá	January 1, 2016	November 30, 2016	14	3	3
John McEnroe	June 2016	August 2016	9	6	6
Richard Krajicek	December 2016	June 2017	3	3	6
Mark Knowles	June 2017	August 2017	6	6	10
Dušan Vemić	August 2017	August 2017	10	10	10
Javier Piles	October 2017	January 2018	12	12	31
Goran Ivanišević	March 2018	March 2019	38	14	14
Fabrice Santoro	March 2019	August 2019	14	14	21
Mario Tudor	August 2019	current	20		

== ATP Tour career earnings ==
This table summarizes the career prize money earned by Raonic at ITF Futures, ATP Challenger Tour, ATP World Tour, and Grand Slam tournaments. It does not include money earned from endorsements, appearance fees, or other sources.

Annual and career earnings summary (singles and doubles)
	Titles			Earnings		
Year	Grand Slam	ATP	Total	US$	ATP rank	Ref
2007	0	0	0	1,348	1,442	
2008	0	0	0	6,394	850	
2009	0	0	0	20,247	449	
2010	0	0	0	95,774	199	
2011	0	1	1	674,966	45	
2012	0	2	2	1,191,394	15	
2013	0	2	2	1,727,799	15	
2014	0	1	1	3,514,743	9	
2015	0	1	1	1,493,503	16	
2016	0	1	1	5,588,492	4	
2017	0	0	0	1,409,446	29	
2018	0	0	0	1,784,657	21	
2019	0	0	0	1,291,082	40	
2020	0	0	0	962,836	23	
2021	0	0	0	376,291	130	
2022	0	0	0	0	n/a	
2023	0	0	0	$12,709	609	
2024	0	0	0	$243,120	212	
Career	0	8	8	$20,764,512	33	
