= 2012 Memphis International – Doubles =

Doubles
- 2012 Regions Morgan Keegan Championships and the Cellular South Cup

Final
- Champion: (Czech Republic) Andrea Hlaváčková (Czech Republic) Lucie Hradecká
- Runner-up: (Russia) Vera Dushevina (Belarus) Olga Govortsova
- Score: 6–3, 6–4

Details
- Draw: 16
- Seeds: 4

Events
Singles	men	women
Doubles	men	women
← 2011 ·	Regions Morgan Keegan Championships	· 2013 →
← 2011 ·	Cellular South Cup	· 2013 →

Olga Govortsova and Alla Kudryavtseva were the defending champions, but Kudryavtseva chose not to participate.
Govortsova partnered up with Vera Dushevina, but lost in the final 3–6, 4–6 to Andrea Hlaváčková and Lucie Hradecká.

== Seeds ==
1. (Czech Republic) Andrea Hlaváčková / (Czech Republic) Lucie Hradecká (champions)
2. (Russia) Vera Dushevina / (Belarus) Olga Govortsova (final)
3. (Latvia) Līga Dekmeijere / (Russia) Nadia Petrova (semifinals, retired)
4. (Netherlands) Michaëlla Krajicek / (Georgia (country)) Anna Tatishvili (semifinals)

== Draw ==
=== Key ===
- Q = Qualifier
- WC = Wild card
- LL = Lucky loser
- Alt = Alternate
- SE = Special exempt
- PR = Protected ranking
- ITF = ITF entry
- JE = Junior exempt
- w/o = Walkover
- r = Retired
- d = Defaulted
- SR = Special ranking

=== Draw ===
First round
1	(Czech Republic) A Hlaváčková (Czech Republic) L Hradecká	6	6
(France) I Pavlovic (Russia) E Rodina	0	3
WC	(Australia) A Hibberd (United States) T Welcher	0	0
(United States) L Lee-Waters (United States) M Moulton-Levy	6	6
4	(Netherlands) M Krajicek (Georgia (country)) A Tatishvili	6	6
(Russia) M Kondratieva (France) S Lefevre	2	0
(New Zealand) M Erakovic (Kazakhstan) K Pervak	6	6
WC	(United States) L Davis (United States) M Keys	2	3
Alt	(Germany) S Mikesz (Ukraine) M Slupska	1	0
(United States) J Hampton (United States) M Oudin	6	6
(Sweden) S Arvidsson (Sweden) J Larsson	0	3
3	(Latvia) L Dekmeijere (Russia) N Petrova	6	6
(Italy) A Brianti (France) P Parmentier	3	1
(United Kingdom) H Watson (Germany) J Wöhr	6	6
(Russia) V Dolonts (France) S Foretz Gacon	6	2	[8]
2	(Russia) V Dushevina (Belarus) O Govortsova	4	6	[10]

Quarterfinals
1	(Czech Republic) A Hlaváčková (Czech Republic) L Hradecká	6	6
(United States) L Lee-Waters (United States) M Moulton-Levy	2	3
4	(Netherlands) M Krajicek (Georgia (country)) A Tatishvili	6
(New Zealand) M Erakovic (Kazakhstan) K Pervak	3	r
(United States) J Hampton (United States) M Oudin	2	4
3	(Latvia) L Dekmeijere (Russia) N Petrova	6	6
(United Kingdom) H Watson (Germany) J Wöhr	4	0
2	(Russia) V Dushevina (Belarus) O Govortsova	6	6

Semifinals
1	(Czech Republic) A Hlaváčková (Czech Republic) L Hradecká	6	6
4	(Netherlands) M Krajicek (Georgia (country)) A Tatishvili	3	3
3	(Latvia) L Dekmeijere (Russia) N Petrova	6	1^{r}
2	(Russia) V Dushevina (Belarus) O Govortsova	2	4

Finals
1	(Czech Republic) A Hlaváčková (Czech Republic) L Hradecká	6	6
2	(Russia) V Dushevina (Belarus) O Govortsova	3	4
