= 2012 Regions Morgan Keegan Championships – Doubles =

Doubles
- 2012 Regions Morgan Keegan Championships and the Cellular South Cup

Final
- Champion: (Belarus) Max Mirnyi (Canada) Daniel Nestor
- Runner-up: (Croatia) Ivan Dodig (Brazil) Marcelo Melo
- Score: 4–6, 7–5, [10–7]

Events
Singles	men	women
Doubles	men	women
← 2011 ·	Regions Morgan Keegan Championships	· 2013 →
← 2011 ·	Cellular South Cup	· 2013 →

Max Mirnyi and Daniel Nestor defended the title winning against Ivan Dodig and Marcelo Melo 4–6, 7–5, [10–7].

== Seeds ==
1. (Belarus) Max Mirnyi / (Canada) Daniel Nestor (champions)
2. (Austria) Jürgen Melzer / (Germany) Philipp Petzschner (first round)
3. (Czech Republic) František Čermák / (Slovakia) Filip Polášek (quarterfinals)
4. (Mexico) Santiago González / (Germany) Christopher Kas (first round)

== Draw ==
=== Key ===
- Q = Qualifier
- WC = Wild card
- LL = Lucky loser
- Alt = Alternate
- SE = Special exempt
- PR = Protected ranking
- ITF = ITF entry
- JE = Junior exempt
- w/o = Walkover
- r = Retired
- d = Defaulted
- SR = Special ranking

=== Draw ===
First round
1	(Belarus) M Mirnyi (Canada) D Nestor	7	6
(South Africa) K Anderson (The Bahamas) M Knowles	5	2
WC	(United States) R Harrison (United States) D Kudla	6	6
(Israel) J Erlich (Israel) A Ram	2	3
4	(Mexico) S González (Germany) C Kas	6^{1}	6^{2}
(United States) J Isner (United States) S Querrey	7^{7}	7^{7}
(Russia) A Bogomolov Jr. (Poland) Ł Kubot	6	4	[15]
(United States) S Lipsky (United States) R Ram	2	6	[13]
(United Kingdom) C Fleming (United Kingdom) R Hutchins	7^{7}	6
(United States) E Butorac (Brazil) B Soares	6^{5}	3
(Philippines) TC Huey (Belgium) X Malisse	5	4
3	(Czech Republic) F Čermák (Slovakia) F Polášek	7	6
(Croatia) I Dodig (Brazil) M Melo	6	6
WC	(United States) R Sweeting (Australia) B Tomic	4	4
(France) J Benneteau (Belgium) O Rochus	6	3	[10]
2	(Austria) J Melzer (Germany) P Petzschner	1	6	[5]

Quarterfinals
1	(Belarus) M Mirnyi (Canada) D Nestor	7^{11}	3	[10]
WC	(United States) R Harrison (United States) D Kudla	6^{9}	6	[8]
(United States) J Isner (United States) S Querrey	2	6	[15]
(Russia) A Bogomolov Jr. (Poland) Ł Kubot	6	3	[13]
(United Kingdom) C Fleming (United Kingdom) R Hutchins	6	3	[10]
3	(Czech Republic) F Čermák (Slovakia) F Polášek	3	6	[3]
(Croatia) I Dodig (Brazil) M Melo	6	6
(France) J Benneteau (Belgium) O Rochus	3	4

Semifinals
1	(Belarus) M Mirnyi (Canada) D Nestor	7^{7}	6
(United States) J Isner (United States) S Querrey	6^{3}	2
(United Kingdom) C Fleming (United Kingdom) R Hutchins	3	6^{4}
(Croatia) I Dodig (Brazil) M Melo	6	7

Final
1	(Belarus) M Mirnyi (Canada) D Nestor	4	7	[10]
(Croatia) I Dodig (Brazil) M Melo	6	5	[7]
