= 2013 U.S. National Indoor Tennis Championships – Men's doubles =

Men's doubles
- 2013 U.S. National Indoor Tennis Championships

Final
- Champion: (United States) Bob Bryan (United States) Mike Bryan
- Runner-up: (United States) James Blake (United States) Jack Sock
- Score: 6–1, 6–2

Events
Singles	men	women
Doubles	men	women
← 2012 ·	U.S. National Indoor Championships	· 2014 →

Max Mirnyi and Daniel Nestor were the two-time defending champions but decided not to participate together. Mirnyi played with Horia Tecău, but the team lost in the first round to James Blake and Jack Sock. Nestor partnered up with Łukasz Kubot, but the team lost in the semifinals to Blake and Sock.

== Seeds ==
1. (United States) Bob Bryan / (United States) Mike Bryan (champions)
2. (Belarus) Max Mirnyi / (Romania) Horia Tecău (first round)
3. (Poland) Łukasz Kubot / (Canada) Daniel Nestor (semifinals)
4. (Austria) Alexander Peya / (Brazil) Bruno Soares (semifinals)

== Draw ==
=== Key ===
- Q = Qualifier
- WC = Wild card
- LL = Lucky loser
- Alt = Alternate
- SE = Special exempt
- PR = Protected ranking
- ITF = ITF entry
- JE = Junior exempt
- w/o = Walkover
- r = Retired
- d = Defaulted
- SR = Special ranking

=== Draw ===
First round
1	(United States) B Bryan (United States) M Bryan	6	6
(Colombia) R Farah (Germany) T Haas	1	1
(Mexico) S González (United States) S Lipsky	6	6
Alt	(Belgium) X Malisse (Australia) M Matosevic	4	3
4	(Austria) A Peya (Brazil) B Soares	6	6
WC	(United States) C Harrison (United States) R Harrison	2	4
(Philippines) TC Huey (United Kingdom) D Inglot	5	4
(United States) E Butorac (Australia) P Hanley	7	6
(Colombia) JS Cabal (Germany) F Mayer	1	7	[5]
(Austria) J Melzer (Germany) P Petzschner	6	5	[10]
Alt	(Czech Republic) J Levinský (Chinese Taipei) Y-h Lu	4	1
3	(Poland) Ł Kubot (Canada) D Nestor	6	6
(Croatia) M Čilić (Brazil) A Sá	7^{7}	5	[11]
(Croatia) I Dodig (Brazil) M Melo	6^{5}	7	[9]
WC	(United States) J Blake (United States) J Sock	3	6	[11]
2	(Belarus) M Mirnyi (Romania) H Tecău	6	3	[9]

Quarterfinals
1	(United States) B Bryan (United States) M Bryan	7	6
(Mexico) S González (United States) S Lipsky	5	4
4	(Austria) A Peya (Brazil) B Soares	6	6
(United States) E Butorac (Australia) P Hanley	4	2
(Austria) J Melzer (Germany) P Petzschner	4	5
3	(Poland) Ł Kubot (Canada) D Nestor	6	7
(Croatia) M Čilić (Brazil) A Sá	7	6^{5}	[2]
WC	(United States) J Blake (United States) J Sock	5	7^{7}	[10]

Semifinals
1	(United States) B Bryan (United States) M Bryan	6	7^{7}
4	(Austria) A Peya (Brazil) B Soares	3	6^{3}
3	(Poland) Ł Kubot (Canada) D Nestor	6	4	[10]
WC	(United States) J Blake (United States) J Sock	2	6	[12]

Final
1	(United States) B Bryan (United States) M Bryan	6	6
WC	(United States) J Blake (United States) J Sock	1	2
