= 2014 U.S. National Indoor Tennis Championships =

- Date: February 10– 16
- Edition: 39th
- Category: World Tour 250
- Draw: 28S / 16D
- Prize money: $442,750
- Surface: Hard
- Location: Memphis, United States
- Venue: Racquet Club of Memphis

Champions

Singles
- (Japan) Kei Nishikori

Doubles
- (United States) Eric Butorac / (South Africa) Raven Klaasen
← 2013 ·	U.S. National Indoor Championships	· 2015 →

The 2014 U.S. National Indoor Tennis Championships was a 2014 ATP World Tour men's tennis tournament, played on indoor hard courts. The tournament from this year was downgraded from ATP World Tour 500 series to ATP World Tour 250 series. It was the 39th edition of the first American tournament of the year and took place at the Racquet Club of Memphis in Memphis, United States, from February 11 through February 17, 2014. First-seeded Kei Nishikori won his second consecutive singles title at the event.

== Finals ==
=== Singles ===
- (Japan) Kei Nishikori defeated (Croatia) Ivo Karlović, 6–4, 7–6^{(7–0)}

=== Doubles ===
- (United States) Eric Butorac / (South Africa) Raven Klaasen defeated (United States) Bob Bryan / (United States) Mike Bryan, 6–4, 6–4

== Singles main-draw entrants ==
=== Seeds ===
Country	Player	Rank^{1}	Seed
JPN	Kei Nishikori	17	1
ESP	Feliciano López	26	2
AUS	Lleyton Hewitt	40	3
TPE	Lu Yen-hsun	53	4
AUS	Marinko Matosevic	54	5
USA	Sam Querrey	55	6
POL	Michał Przysiężny	57	7
KAZ	Mikhail Kukushkin	59	8

- ^{1} Rankings as of February 3, 2014

=== Other entrants ===
The following players received wildcards into the singles main draw:

- (Cyprus) Marcos Baghdatis
- (Australia) Nick Kyrgios
- (Japan) Kei Nishikori

The following player received entry as a special exempt:

- (Germany) Björn Phau

The following players received entry from the qualifying draw:

- (Belgium) David Goffin
- (United States) Denis Kudla
- (United States) Alex Kuznetsov
- (United States) Rajeev Ram

=== Withdrawals ===
Before the tournament

- (Canada) Vasek Pospisil (back injury)
- (Israel) Dudi Sela
- (Serbia) Janko Tipsarević

=== Retirements ===
- (Chinese Taipei) Lu Yen-hsun (neck pain)

== ATP doubles main-draw entrants ==
=== Seeds ===
Country	Player	Country	Player	Rank^{1}	Seed
USA	Bob Bryan	USA	Mike Bryan	2	1
USA	Eric Butorac	RSA	Raven Klaasen	64	2
MEX	Santiago González	USA	Scott Lipsky	71	3
AUS	Samuel Groth	BLR	Max Mirnyi	115	4

- ^{1} Rankings as of February 3, 2014

=== Other entrants ===
The following pairs received wildcards into the doubles main draw:

- (United States) Ryan Harrison / (United States) Sam Querrey
- (Republic of Ireland) David O'Hare / (United Kingdom) Joe Salisbury

The following pair received entry as alternates:

- (France) Adrian Mannarino / (United States) Michael Russell

=== Withdrawals ===
Before the tournament

- (Poland) Michał Przysiężny (back injury)
