= 2012 Regions Morgan Keegan Championships – Singles =

Singles
- 2012 Regions Morgan Keegan Championships and the Cellular South Cup

Final
- Champion: (Austria) Jürgen Melzer
- Runner-up: (Canada) Milos Raonic
- Score: 7–5, 7–6^{(7–4)}

Details
- Draw: 32
- Seeds: 8

Events
Singles	men	women
Doubles	men	women
← 2011 ·	Regions Morgan Keegan Championships	· 2013 →
← 2011 ·	Cellular South Cup	· 2013 →

Andy Roddick was the defending champion, but lost in the first round to Xavier Malisse. Jürgen Melzer defeated Milos Raonic in the final 7–5, 7–6^{(7–4)}.

== Seeds ==
1. (United States) John Isner (quarterfinals)
2. (United States) Andy Roddick (first round)
3. (Czech Republic) Radek Štěpánek (semifinals)
4. (Canada) Milos Raonic (final)
5. (Russia) Alex Bogomolov Jr. (first round)
6. (France) Julien Benneteau (first round)
7. (South Africa) Kevin Anderson (second round)
8. (Australia) Bernard Tomic (first round)

== Draw ==
=== Key ===
- Q = Qualifier
- WC = Wild card
- LL = Lucky loser
- Alt = Alternate
- SE = Special exempt
- PR = Protected ranking
- ITF = ITF entry
- JE = Junior exempt
- w/o = Walkover
- r = Retired
- d = Defaulted
- SR = Special ranking

=== Finals ===
Semifinals
(Austria) Jürgen Melzer	6	3	6
3	(Czech Republic) Radek Štěpánek	4	6	3
4	(Canada) Milos Raonic	6	6
PR	(Germany) Benjamin Becker	4	4

Final
(Austria) Jürgen Melzer	7	7^{7}
4	(Canada) Milos Raonic	5	6^{4}

=== Top half ===
First round
1	(United States) J Isner	7^{7}	7^{7}
(Luxembourg) G Müller	6^{1}	6^{4}
(Bulgaria) G Dimitrov	6^{4}	6	6^{6}
(United States) D Young	7^{7}	4	7^{8}
(Austria) J Melzer	6^{2}	6	7^{7}
(Uzbekistan) D Istomin	7^{7}	3	6^{4}
(Croatia) I Dodig	5	6	7^{10}
8	(Australia) B Tomic	7	4	6^{8}
3	(Czech Republic) R Štěpánek	6	6
Q	(United States) B Reynolds	3	2
(United States) J Blake	0	2
(United States) R Sweeting	6	6
WC	(United States) S Querrey	2	6	6
(Colombia) A Falla	6	3	4
Q	(United States) R Ginepri	5	3
7	(South Africa) K Anderson	7	6

Second round
1	(United States) J Isner	7^{7}	6
(United States) D Young	6^{3}	4
(Austria) J Melzer	2	6	7^{7}
(Croatia) I Dodig	6	3	6^{5}
3	(Czech Republic) R Štěpánek	4	6	7^{7}
(United States) R Sweeting	6	3	6^{4}
WC	(United States) S Querrey	7^{7}	6
7	(South Africa) K Anderson	6^{4}	4

Quarterfinals
1	(United States) J Isner	3	6^{6}
(Austria) J Melzer	6	7^{8}
3	(Czech Republic) R Štěpánek	7^{7}	6
WC	(United States) S Querrey	6^{5}	0

Semifinals
(Austria) J Melzer	6	3	6
3	(Czech Republic) R Štěpánek	4	6	3

=== Bottom half ===
First round
5	(Russia) A Bogomolov Jr.	6	4	6^{5}
(Belgium) O Rochus	1	6	7^{7}
WC	(United States) R Harrison	6	2	6
WC	(United States) J Sock	3	6	4
Q	(United States) R Kendrick	3	6^{6}
(Ukraine) S Stakhovsky	6	7^{8}
(Latvia) E Gulbis	2	6^{3}
4	(Canada) M Raonic	6	7^{7}
6	(France) J Benneteau	6^{5}	6^{6}
(Germany) P Petzschner	7^{7}	7^{8}
Q	(United States) J Levine	6^{2}	4
(Poland) Ł Kubot	7^{7}	6
PR	(Germany) B Becker	6	6
(Israel) D Sela	4	1
(Belgium) X Malisse	7^{10}	7
2	(United States) A Roddick	6^{8}	5

Second round
(Belgium) O Rochus	6	7
WC	(United States) R Harrison	4	5
(Ukraine) S Stakhovsky	4	4
4	(Canada) M Raonic	6	6
(Germany) P Petzschner	6^{5}	2
(Poland) Ł Kubot	7^{7}	6
PR	(Germany) B Becker	7^{7}	6
(Belgium) X Malisse	6^{4}	4

Quarterfinals
(Belgium) O Rochus	3	6^{3}
4	(Canada) M Raonic	6	7^{7}
(Poland) Ł Kubot	5	6^{5}
PR	(Germany) B Becker	7	7^{7}

Semifinals
4	(Canada) M Raonic	6	6
PR	(Germany) B Becker	4	4

== Qualifying ==
=== Seeds ===
1. (Australia) Matthew Ebden (qualifying competition)
2. (Germany) Tobias Kamke (first round)
3. (United States) Michael Russell (first round)
4. (Canada) Vasek Pospisil (first round)
5. (United States) Bobby Reynolds (qualified)
6. (South Africa) Izak van der Merwe (first round, retired due to an ankle injury)
7. (United States) Jesse Levine (qualified)
8. (United Kingdom) James Ward (first round)

=== Qualifiers ===
1. (United States) Bobby Reynolds
2. (United States) Robert Kendrick
3. (United States) Robby Ginepri
4. (United States) Jesse Levine

=== Draw ===
==== First qualifier ====
First round
1	(Australia) Matthew Ebden	6	6
WC	(Republic of Ireland) David O'Hare	0	4
(United States) Michael Yani	4	4
5	(United States) Bobby Reynolds	6	6

Qualifying competition
1	(Australia) Matthew Ebden	6^{3}	7^{7}	2
5	(United States) Bobby Reynolds	7^{7}	6^{3}	6

==== Second qualifier ====
First round
2	(Germany) Tobias Kamke	1	4
(United States) Denis Kudla	6	6
Alt	(United States) Robert Kendrick	6^{6}	6	6
8	(United Kingdom) James Ward	7^{8}	1	3

Qualifying competition
(United States) Denis Kudla	4	2
Alt	(United States) Robert Kendrick	6	6

==== Third qualifier ====
First round
3	(United States) Michael Russell	3	3
(United States) Robby Ginepri	6	6
(United States) Alex Kuznetsov	6	3
6	(South Africa) Izak van der Merwe	2	0^{r}

Qualifying competition
(United States) Robby Ginepri	7^{7}	6
(United States) Alex Kuznetsov	6^{5}	4

==== Fourth qualifier ====
First round
4	(Canada) Vasek Pospisil	5	3
Alt	(Germany) Mischa Zverev	7	6
WC	(United States) Brian Baker	6^{10}	1
7	(United States) Jesse Levine	7^{12}	6

Qualifying competition
Alt	(Germany) Mischa Zverev	6	3	5
7	(United States) Jesse Levine	2	6	7
