= 2011 Cellular South Cup – Singles =

Singles
- 2011 Regions Morgan Keegan Championships and the Cellular South Cup

Final
- Champion: (Slovakia) Magdaléna Rybáriková
- Runner-up: (Canada) Rebecca Marino
- Score: 6–2, ret.

Details
- Draw: 32
- Seeds: 8

Events
Singles	men	women
Doubles	men	women
← 2010 ·	Regions Morgan Keegan Championships	· 2012 →
← 2010 ·	Cellular South Cup	· 2012 →

Maria Sharapova was the defending champion, but could not compete due to an upper respiratory viral illness.
Magdaléna Rybáriková won this tournament. Rebecca Marino retired in the final, when the score was 6–2 for the Slovak player.

== Seeds ==
1. (Czech Republic) Barbora Záhlavová-Strýcová (first round)
2. (Sweden) Sofia Arvidsson (first round)
3. (United States) Melanie Oudin (second round)
4. (Russia) Alla Kudryavtseva (first round)
5. (Belarus) Olga Govortsova (first round)
6. (Canada) Rebecca Marino (final, retired due to left abdominal injury)
7. (Czech Republic) Renata Voráčová (second round)
8. (United States) Vania King (first round)

== Draw ==
=== Key ===
- Q = Qualifier
- WC = Wild card
- LL = Lucky loser
- Alt = Alternate
- ITF = ITF entry
- PR = Protected ranking
- SR = Special ranking
- SE = Special exempt
- JE = Junior exempt
- JR = Junior Accelerator Programme entrant
- CO = College Accelerator Programme entrant
- NG = Next Gen Accelerator Program entrant
- w/o = Walkover
- r = Retired
- d = Defaulted

=== Finals ===
Semifinals
(Slovakia) Magdaléna Rybáriková	6	4	6
(Czech Republic) Lucie Hradecká	2	6	4
(Russia) Evgeniya Rodina	7	4	1
6	(Canada) Rebecca Marino	6^{1}	6	6

Final
(Slovakia) Magdaléna Rybáriková	6	0
6	(Canada) Rebecca Marino	2	0^{r}

=== Top half ===
First round
1	(Czech Republic) B Záhlavová-Strýcová	1	3
(Netherlands) M Krajicek	6	6
Q	(United States) A Glatch	6	6
WC	(United States) B Capra	2	0
(Canada) A Wozniak	2	2
(United Kingdom) A Keothavong	6	6
(Slovakia) M Rybáriková	6	3	7
8	(United States) V King	1	6	6^{9}
4	(Russia) A Kudryavtseva	6^{6}	4
(Czech Republic) S Záhlavová	7	6
(Czech Republic) L Hradecká	6	6
PR	(United States) J Ditty	1	3
(Georgia (country)) A Tatishvili	3	4
(Russia) K Pervak	6	6
(United States) C McHale	2	1
7	(Czech Republic) R Voráčová	6	6

Second round
(Netherlands) M Krajicek	6^{2}	6	3
Q	(United States) A Glatch	7	3	6
(United Kingdom) A Keothavong	4	6	1
(Slovakia) M Rybáriková	6	3	6
(Czech Republic) S Záhlavová	4	3
(Czech Republic) L Hradecká	6	6
(Russia) K Pervak	6	6
7	(Czech Republic) R Voráčová	1	1

Quarterfinals
Q	(United States) A Glatch	3	2
(Slovakia) M Rybáriková	6	6
(Czech Republic) L Hradecká	6	6
(Russia) K Pervak	4	3

Semifinals
(Slovakia) M Rybáriková	6	4	6
(Czech Republic) L Hradecká	2	6	4

=== Bottom half ===
First round
5	(Belarus) O Govortsova	3	6	4
Q	(France) S Foretz Gacon	6	4	6
Q	(United Kingdom) H Watson	6	7
(Czech Republic) A Hlaváčková	3	5
WC	(Croatia) A Tomljanović	6	0	6^{5}
(Russia) E Rodina	1	6	7
(Russia) A Pivovarova	4	0
3	(United States) M Oudin	6	6
6	(Canada) R Marino	6	6
(United States) J Hampton	4	1
(Romania) S Cîrstea	6	6
WC	(United States) C Harrison	2	2
Q	(Germany) A-L Grönefeld	3	2
(United States) C Vandeweghe	6	6
LL	(United States) A Stevenson	6	6
2	(Sweden) S Arvidsson	3	1

Second round
Q	(France) S Foretz Gacon	2	7	4
Q	(United Kingdom) H Watson	6	5	6
(Russia) E Rodina	6	7
3	(United States) M Oudin	1	5
6	(Canada) R Marino	6	4	6
(Romania) S Cîrstea	2	6	3
(United States) C Vandeweghe	6	6
LL	(United States) A Stevenson	2	2

Quarterfinals
Q	(United Kingdom) H Watson	3	4
(Russia) E Rodina	6	6
6	(Canada) R Marino	6	7
(United States) C Vandeweghe	1	6^{6}

Semifinals
(Russia) E Rodina	7	4	1
6	(Canada) R Marino	6^{1}	6	6

== Qualifying ==
This section displays the qualifying draw of the 2011 Cellular South Cup.

=== Players ===
==== Seeds ====
1. (United Kingdom) Heather Watson (qualified)
2. (Ukraine) Olga Savchuk (first round)
3. (Australia) Sally Peers (first round)
4. (Germany) Anna-Lena Grönefeld (qualified)
5. (France) Stéphanie Foretz Gacon (qualified)
6. (United States) Madison Brengle (qualifying competition)
7. (Portugal) Michelle Larcher de Brito (qualifying competition)
8. (United Kingdom) Katie O'Brien (qualifying competition)

==== Qualifiers ====
1. (United Kingdom) Heather Watson
2. (United States) Alexa Glatch
3. (France) Stéphanie Foretz Gacon
4. (Germany) Anna-Lena Grönefeld

==== Lucky losers ====
1. (United States) Alexandra Stevenson

=== Qualifying draw ===
==== First qualifier ====
First round
1	(United Kingdom) Heather Watson	6	6
WC	(United States) Ashley Murdock	1	1
(New Zealand) Marina Erakovic	2	4
7	(Portugal) Michelle Larcher de Brito	6	6

Qualifying competition
1	(United Kingdom) Heather Watson	7	6
7	(Portugal) Michelle Larcher de Brito	5	1

==== Second qualifier ====
First round
2	(Ukraine) Olga Savchuk	6^{4}	4
(United States) Alexa Glatch	7	6
WC	(United States) Caroline Price	6	2	0
8	(United Kingdom) Katie O'Brien	1	6	6

Qualifying competition
(United States) Alexa Glatch	6	6
8	(United Kingdom) Katie O'Brien	2	3

==== Third qualifier ====
First round
3	(Australia) Sally Peers	2	4
(United States) Alexandra Stevenson	6	6
(Croatia) Jelena Pandžić	1	4
5	(France) Stéphanie Foretz Gacon	6	6

Qualifying competition
(United States) Alexandra Stevenson	1	2
5	(France) Stéphanie Foretz Gacon	6	6

==== Fourth qualifier ====
First round
4	(Germany) Anna-Lena Grönefeld	6	6
(United States) Shelby Rogers	3	2
(France) Julie Coin	5	0^{r}
6	(United States) Madison Brengle	7	0

Qualifying competition
4	(Germany) Anna-Lena Grönefeld	6	6
6	(United States) Madison Brengle	2	2
