= 2011 Regions Morgan Keegan Championships – Doubles =

Doubles
- 2011 Regions Morgan Keegan Championships and the Cellular South Cup

Final
- Champion: (Belarus) Max Mirnyi (Canada) Daniel Nestor
- Runner-up: (United States) Eric Butorac (Curaçao) Jean-Julien Rojer
- Score: 6–2, 6–7^{(6–8)}, [10–3]

Events
Singles	men	women
Doubles	men	women
← 2010 ·	Regions Morgan Keegan Championships	· 2012 →
← 2010 ·	Cellular South Cup	· 2012 →

John Isner and Sam Querrey were the defending champions, but they lost to Kevin Anderson and Ashley Fisher in the quarterfinals.
Max Mirnyi and Daniel Nestor won this tournament. They defeated Eric Butorac and Jean-Julien Rojer 6–2, 6–7^{(6–8)}, [10–3] in the final.

== Seeds ==
1. (Belarus) Max Mirnyi / (Canada) Daniel Nestor (champions)
2. (Pakistan) Aisam-ul-Haq Qureshi / (Romania) Horia Tecău (first round)
3. (The Bahamas) Mark Knowles / (Slovakia) Michal Mertiňák (quarterfinals)
4. (United States) Eric Butorac / (Curaçao) Jean-Julien Rojer (final)

== Draw ==
=== Key ===
- Q = Qualifier
- WC = Wild card
- LL = Lucky loser
- Alt = Alternate
- SE = Special exempt
- PR = Protected ranking
- ITF = ITF entry
- JE = Junior exempt
- w/o = Walkover
- r = Retired
- d = Defaulted
- SR = Special ranking

=== Draw ===
First round
1	(Belarus) M Mirnyi (Canada) D Nestor	6	6
(Chinese Taipei) Y-h Lu (Serbia) J Tipsarević	3	1
Alt	(Germany) B Becker (Germany) M Kohlmann	4	6^{3}
WC	(United States) R Harrison (United States) A Roddick	6	7
3	(The Bahamas) M Knowles (Slovakia) M Mertiňák	6	6
(Israel) J Erlich (Israel) A Ram	4	4
(Brazil) M Melo (Brazil) B Soares	6	3	[15]
WC	(United States) S Lipsky (United States) D Martin	3	6	[13]
(Argentina) JM del Potro (Czech Republic) R Štěpánek	7	3	[14]
(Germany) D Brown (Netherlands) R Wassen	6^{5}	6	[12]
(Mexico) S González (Germany) C Kas	6	3	[6]
4	(United States) E Butorac (Curaçao) J-J Rojer	4	6	[10]
(United States) T Parrott (Slovakia) F Polášek	3	6	[8]
(South Africa) K Anderson (Australia) A Fisher	6	4	[10]
(United States) J Isner (United States) S Querrey	6	6
2	(Pakistan) A-u-H Qureshi (Romania) H Tecău	4	3

Quarterfinals
1	(Belarus) M Mirnyi (Canada) D Nestor	7	7
WC	(United States) R Harrison (United States) A Roddick	5	6^{5}
3	(The Bahamas) M Knowles (Slovakia) M Mertiňák	3	6	[14]
(Brazil) M Melo (Brazil) B Soares	6	3	[12]
(Argentina) JM del Potro (Czech Republic) R Štěpánek	4	2
4	(United States) E Butorac (Curaçao) J-J Rojer	6	6
(South Africa) K Anderson (Australia) A Fisher	6	7
(United States) J Isner (United States) S Querrey	2	5

Semifinals
1	(Belarus) M Mirnyi (Canada) D Nestor	7	6
3	(The Bahamas) M Knowles (Slovakia) M Mertiňák	6^{4}	3
4	(United States) E Butorac (Curaçao) J-J Rojer	6	6
(South Africa) K Anderson (Australia) A Fisher	1	4

Final
1	(Belarus) M Mirnyi (Canada) D Nestor	6	6^{6}	[10]
4	(United States) E Butorac (Curaçao) J-J Rojer	2	7	[3]
