= 2011 Regions Morgan Keegan Championships and the Cellular South Cup =

2011 Regions Morgan Keegan Championships and Cellular South Cup
- Date: February 13–20
- Edition: 36th (Men) / 26th (Women)
- Category: ATP World Tour 500; WTA International-level tournament

Champions

Men's singles
- (United States) Andy Roddick

Women's singles
- (Slovakia) Magdaléna Rybáriková

Men's doubles
- (Belarus) Max Mirnyi / (Canada) Daniel Nestor

Women's doubles
- (Belarus) Olga Govortsova / (Russia) Alla Kudryavtseva
← 2010 ·	Regions Morgan Keegan Championships	· 2012 →
← 2010 ·	Cellular South Cup	· 2012 →

The 2011 Regions Morgan Keegan Championships and the Cellular South Cup was an ATP World Tour and WTA Tour event held at the hardcourts of the Racquet Club of Memphis in Memphis, Tennessee in the United States. It was the 35th edition of the Regions Morgan Keegan Championships and the 26th edition of the Cellular South Cup. The Regions Morgan Keegan Championships was part of the ATP World Tour 500 series on the 2011 ATP World Tour, and the Cellular South Cup was an International-level tournament on the 2011 WTA Tour. The event took place from 13 February through 20 to February, 2011.

== Finals ==
=== Men's singles ===
(United States) Andy Roddick defeated (Canada) Milos Raonic, 7–6^{(8–6)}, 6–7^{(11–13)}, 7–5

- It was Roddick's 1st title of the year and 30th of his career. It was his 3rd win at the event, also winning in 2002 and 2009.

=== Women's singles ===
(Slovakia) Magdaléna Rybáriková defeated (Canada) Rebecca Marino, 6–2, ret.

- It was Rybarikova's first title of the year and 2nd of her career.

=== Men's doubles ===
(Belarus) Max Mirnyi / (Canada) Daniel Nestor defeated (United States) Eric Butorac / (Curaçao) Jean-Julien Rojer, 6–2, 6–7^{(6–8)}, [10–3]

=== Women's doubles ===
(Belarus) Olga Govortsova / (Russia) Alla Kudryavtseva defeated (Czech Republic) Andrea Hlaváčková / (Czech Republic) Lucie Hradecká, 6–3, 4–6, [10–8]

== WTA entrants ==
=== Seeds ===
Country	Player	Rank^{1}	Seed
CZE	Barbora Záhlavová-Strýcová	56	1
SWE	Sofia Arvidsson	60	2
USA	Melanie Oudin	61	3
RUS	Alla Kudryavtseva	71	4
BLR	Olga Govortsova	73	5
CAN	Rebecca Marino	84	6
CZE	Renata Voráčová	85	7
USA	Vania King	86	8

- Rankings are as of February 7, 2011.

=== Other entrants ===
The following players received wildcards into the main draw:

- (United States) Beatrice Capra
- (United States) Catherine Harrison
- (Croatia) Ajla Tomljanović

The following players received entry from the qualifying draw:

- (France) Stéphanie Foretz Gacon
- (United States) Alexa Glatch
- (Germany) Anna-Lena Grönefeld
- (United Kingdom) Heather Watson

The following player received the Lucky loser spot:

- (United States) Alexandra Stevenson

== ATP entrants ==
=== Seeds ===
Country	Player	Rank^{1}	Seed
USA	Andy Roddick	8	1
ESP	Fernando Verdasco	9	2
FRA	~~Gaël Monfils~~	~~12~~	~~3~~
USA	Mardy Fish	16	4
USA	Sam Querrey	17	5
USA	John Isner	23	6
TPE	Lu Yen-hsun	38	7
RSA	Kevin Anderson	40	8
BEL	Xavier Malisse	45	9

- Rankings as of February 7, 2011

=== Other entrants ===
The following players received wildcards into the main draw:

- (United States) James Blake
- (Argentina) Juan Martín del Potro
- (Canada) Milos Raonic

The following player received entry as an alternate:

- (Slovakia) Lukáš Lacko

The following players received entry from the qualifying draw:

- (Czech Republic) Jan Hájek
- (United States) Robert Kendrick
- (United States) Michael Russell
- (United States) Ryan Sweeting
