= 2014 U.S. National Indoor Tennis Championships – Doubles =

Doubles
- 2014 U.S. National Indoor Tennis Championships

Final
- Champions: (United States) Eric Butorac (South Africa) Raven Klaasen
- Runners-up: (United States) Bob Bryan (United States) Mike Bryan
- Score: 6–4, 6–4

Events
Singles	Doubles
← 2013 ·	U.S. National Indoor Championships	· 2015 →

Bob and Mike Bryan were the defending champions, but lost in the final to Eric Butorac and Raven Klaasen, 4–6, 4–6.

== Seeds ==
1. (United States) Bob Bryan / (United States) Mike Bryan (final)
2. (United States) Eric Butorac / (South Africa) Raven Klaasen (champions)
3. (Mexico) Santiago González / (United States) Scott Lipsky (semifinals)
4. (Australia) Samuel Groth / (Belarus) Max Mirnyi (first round)

== Draw ==
=== Key ===
- Q = Qualifier
- WC = Wild card
- LL = Lucky loser
- Alt = Alternate
- SE = Special exempt
- PR = Protected ranking
- ITF = ITF entry
- JE = Junior exempt
- w/o = Walkover
- r = Retired
- d = Defaulted
- SR = Special ranking

=== Draw ===
First round
1	(United States) B Bryan (United States) M Bryan	6	6
WC	(Republic of Ireland) D O'Hare (United Kingdom) J Salisbury	4	3
(Poland) T Bednarek (Croatia) I Karlović	7^{7}	4	[7]
(Australia) C Guccione (Australia) L Hewitt	6^{2}	6	[10]
3	(Mexico) S González (United States) S Lipsky	6	6
(Australia) M Ebden (United States) R Ram	2	4
Alt	(France) A Mannarino (United States) M Russell	5	3
(Australia) R Junaid (Germany) P Marx	7	6
(Germany) B Becker (Chinese Taipei) Y-h Lu	5	6	[4]
WC	(United States) R Harrison (United States) S Querrey	7	1	[10]
(Czech Republic) F Čermák (Russia) M Elgin	6	7^{7}
4	(Australia) S Groth (Belarus) M Mirnyi	2	6^{4}
(Russia) T Gabashvili (Kazakhstan) M Kukushkin	7	2	[10]
(Australia) M Matosevic (Germany) F Moser	5	6	[6]
(United States) J Sock (United States) D Young	6^{4}	4
2	(United States) E Butorac (South Africa) R Klaasen	7^{7}	6

Quarterfinals
1	(United States) B Bryan (United States) M Bryan	6	7^{7}
(Australia) C Guccione (Australia) L Hewitt	3	6^{0}
3	(Mexico) S González (United States) S Lipsky	6	7^{7}
(Australia) R Junaid (Germany) P Marx	0	6^{4}
WC	(United States) R Harrison (United States) S Querrey	4	4
(Czech Republic) F Čermák (Russia) M Elgin	6	6
(Russia) T Gabashvili (Kazakhstan) M Kukushkin	2	3
2	(United States) E Butorac (South Africa) R Klaasen	6	6

Semifinals
1	(United States) B Bryan (United States) M Bryan	6	6^{2}	[10]
3	(Mexico) S González (United States) S Lipsky	3	7^{7}	[6]
(Czech Republic) F Čermák (Russia) M Elgin	5	4
2	(United States) E Butorac (South Africa) R Klaasen	7	6

Final
1	(United States) B Bryan (United States) M Bryan	4	4
2	(United States) E Butorac (South Africa) R Klaasen	6	6
