= 2013 U.S. National Indoor Tennis Championships – Women's singles =

Women's singles
- 2013 U.S. National Indoor Tennis Championships

Final
- Champion: (New Zealand) Marina Erakovic
- Runner-up: (Germany) Sabine Lisicki
- Score: 6–1, ret.

Details
- Draw: 32
- Seeds: 8

Events
Singles	men	women
Doubles	men	women
- U.S. National Indoor Tennis Championships

Sofia Arvidsson was the defending champion, but lost to Marina Erakovic in the second round in a replay of the previous final. Erakovic made it to the finals again, this year defeating Sabine Lisicki 6–1 in the first set after Lisicki retired due to illness before the start of the second set. This was Erakovic's first WTA tour level title and the first New Zealander to win the WTA title since Belinda Cordwell in 1989.

== Seeds ==
1. (Belgium) Kirsten Flipkens (quarterfinals)
2. (Sweden) Sofia Arvidsson (second round)
3. (Germany) Sabine Lisicki (final, retired due to illness)
4. (United Kingdom) Heather Watson (quarterfinals)
5. (Czech Republic) Lucie Hradecká (first round)
6. (South Africa) Chanelle Scheepers (first round)
7. (Slovakia) Magdaléna Rybáriková (semifinals)
8. (France) Kristina Mladenovic (quarterfinals)

== Draw ==
Key

- Q = Qualifier
- WC = Wild card
- LL = Lucky loser
- Alt = Alternate
- ITF = ITF entry
- PR = Protected ranking
- SR = Special ranking
- SE = Special exempt
- JE = Junior exempt
- JR = Junior Accelerator Programme entrant
- CO = College Accelerator Programme entrant
- NG = Next Gen Accelerator Program entrant
- w/o = Walkover
- r = Retired
- d = Defaulted

=== Finals ===
Semifinals
7	(Slovakia) Magdaléna Rybáriková	5	5
3	(Germany) Sabine Lisicki	7	7
(Switzerland) Stefanie Vögele	2	4
(New Zealand) Marina Erakovic	6	6

Final
3	(Germany) Sabine Lisicki	1	0^{r}
(New Zealand) Marina Erakovic	6	0

=== Top half ===
First round
1	(Belgium) K Flipkens	6	6
(Israel) S Pe'er	2	2
(Ukraine) L Tsurenko	6	6
Q	(United States) M Sanchez	2	4
(Kazakhstan) K Pervak	7	1	3
(United States) L Davis	5	6	6
(France) S Foretz Gacon	3	1
7	(Slovakia) M Rybáriková	6	6
3	(Germany) S Lisicki	7	6
Q	(United States) M Keys	5	3
(Hungary) M Czink	4	6	6
(Russia) O Puchkova	6	3	3
WC	(United States) V Duval	3	6	6
(Sweden) J Larsson	6	1	3
WC	(United States) C Collins	3	1
8	(France) K Mladenovic	6	6

Second round
1	(Belgium) K Flipkens	7	3	6
(Ukraine) L Tsurenko	5	6	3
(United States) L Davis	6^{2}	2
7	(Slovakia) M Rybáriková	7^{7}	6
3	(Germany) S Lisicki	7^{7}	4	6
(Hungary) M Czink	6^{0}	6	2
WC	(United States) V Duval	1	6	3
8	(France) K Mladenovic	6	3	6

Quarterfinals
1	(Belgium) K Flipkens	7^{13}	5	3
7	(Slovakia) M Rybáriková	6^{11}	7	6
3	(Germany) S Lisicki	6	6
8	(France) K Mladenovic	3	3

Semifinals
7	(Slovakia) M Rybáriková	5	5
3	(Germany) S Lisicki	7	7

=== Bottom half ===
First round
5	(Czech Republic) L Hradecká	3	4
Q	(France) C Feuerstein	6	6
(Switzerland) S Vögele	7^{7}	6
(Spain) S Soler Espinosa	6^{5}	0
(United States) M Oudin	4	6	3
(Czech Republic) A Hlaváčková	6	3	6
(Kazakhstan) G Voskoboeva	5	7	6^{4}
4	(United Kingdom) H Watson	7	5	7^{7}
6	(South Africa) C Scheepers	2	1
(United States) C Vandeweghe	6	6
(United States) J Hampton	6	6
WC	(Spain) G Muguruza	3	3
(New Zealand) M Erakovic	4	7^{8}	6
(Germany) A Beck	6	6^{6}	4
Q	(Slovakia) J Čepelová	4	4
2	(Sweden) S Arvidsson	6	6

Second round
Q	(France) C Feuerstein	6	6^{2}	1
(Switzerland) S Vögele	3	7^{7}	6
(Czech Republic) A Hlaváčková	6	0	3
4	(United Kingdom) H Watson	2	6	6
(United States) C Vandeweghe	3	0
(United States) J Hampton	6	6
(New Zealand) M Erakovic	6	3	6
2	(Sweden) S Arvidsson	1	6	3

Quarterfinals
(Switzerland) S Vögele	6	6
4	(United Kingdom) H Watson	1	2
(United States) J Hampton	5	2
(New Zealand) M Erakovic	7	6

Semifinals
(Switzerland) S Vögele	2	4
(New Zealand) M Erakovic	6	6

== Qualifying ==
=== Seeds ===
1. (United States) Madison Keys (qualified)
2. (Serbia) Vesna Dolonc (first round, retired)
3. (Slovakia) Jana Čepelová (qualified)
4. (Puerto Rico) Monica Puig (first round)
5. (Croatia) Mirjana Lučić-Baroni (qualifying competition)
6. (United States) Maria Sanchez (qualified)
7. (Russia) Valeria Savinykh (first round)
8. (United States) Alexa Glatch (qualifying competition)

=== Qualifiers ===
1. (United States) Madison Keys
2. (United States) Maria Sanchez
3. (Slovakia) Jana Čepelová
4. (France) Claire Feuerstein

=== Draw ===
==== First qualifier ====
First round
1	(United States) Madison Keys	6	6
(United States) Mallory Burdette	3	4
(Canada) Rebecca Marino	3	4
8	(United States) Alexa Glatch	6	6

Qualifying competition
1	(United States) Madison Keys	6	7
8	(United States) Alexa Glatch	2	5

==== Second qualifier ====
First round
2	(Serbia) Vesna Dolonc	1	0^{r}
(United States) Irina Falconi	6	3
WC	(Ukraine) Elyzaveta Tymchenko	2	1
6	(United States) Maria Sanchez	6	6

Qualifying competition
(United States) Irina Falconi	4	2
6	(United States) Maria Sanchez	6	6

==== Third qualifier ====
First round
3	(Slovakia) Jana Čepelová	7	7
(Portugal) Michelle Larcher de Brito	5	5
(Kazakhstan) Sesil Karatantcheva	4	3
5	(Croatia) Mirjana Lučić-Baroni	6	6

Qualifying competition
3	(Slovakia) Jana Čepelová	3	7	7
5	(Croatia) Mirjana Lučić-Baroni	6	5	5

==== Fourth qualifier ====
First round
4	(Puerto Rico) Monica Puig	1	6	6^{3}
(France) Claire Feuerstein	6	3	7^{7}
WC	(United States) Taylor Townsend	6	2	6
7	(Russia) Valeria Savinykh	2	6	1

Qualifying competition
(France) Claire Feuerstein	6	6
WC	(United States) Taylor Townsend	4	4
