= 2011 Cellular South Cup – Doubles =

Doubles
- 2011 Regions Morgan Keegan Championships and the Cellular South Cup

Final
- Champion: (Belarus) Olga Govortsova (Russia) Alla Kudryavtseva
- Runner-up: (Czech Republic) Andrea Hlaváčková (Czech Republic) Lucie Hradecká
- Score: 6–3, 4–6, [10–8]

Details
- Draw: 16
- Seeds: 4

Events
Singles	men	women
Doubles	men	women
← 2010 ·	Regions Morgan Keegan Championships	· 2012 →
← 2010 ·	Cellular South Cup	· 2012 →

Vania King and Michaëlla Krajicek were the defending champions; however, they were eliminated by Olga Govortsova and Alla Kudryavtseva in the semifinals.
Finally, Govortsova and Kudryavtseva defeated Andrea Hlaváčková and Lucie Hradecká in the final, 6–3, 4–6, [10–8].

== Seeds ==
1. (Czech Republic) Renata Voráčová / (Czech Republic) Barbora Záhlavová-Strýcová (quarterfinals)
2. (Belarus) Olga Govortsova / (Russia) Alla Kudryavtseva (champions)
3. (United States) Vania King / (Netherlands) Michaëlla Krajicek (semifinals)
4. (Czech Republic) Andrea Hlaváčková / (Czech Republic) Lucie Hradecká (final)

== Main draw ==
=== Key ===
- Q = Qualifier
- WC = Wild card
- LL = Lucky loser
- Alt = Alternate
- ITF = ITF entry
- PR = Protected ranking
- SR = Special ranking
- SE = Special exempt
- JE = Junior exempt
- JR = Junior Accelerator Programme entrant
- CO = College Accelerator Programme entrant
- NG = Next Gen Accelerator Program entrant
- w/o = Walkover
- r = Retired
- d = Defaulted

=== Draw ===
First round
1	(Czech Republic) R Voráčová (Czech Republic) B Záhlavová-Strýcová	6	6
(United States) J Ditty (United States) C Gullickson	3	2
WC	(United States) C Collins (United States) M Slupska	3	1
(Russia) K Pervak (Turkey) İ Şenoğlu	6	6
4	(Czech Republic) A Hlaváčková (Czech Republic) L Hradecká	6	6
(Romania) S Cîrstea (Russia) A Pivovarova	3	2
WC	(United States) J Hampton (United States) M Oudin	6	6
(France) J Coin (United Kingdom) A Keothavong	4	2
(United Kingdom) S Borwell (Canada) M-È Pelletier	2	4
(Ukraine) O Savchuk (Georgia (country)) A Tatishvili	6	6
(Latvia) L Dekmeijere (France) S Foretz Gacon	6	3	[7]
3	(United States) V King (Netherlands) M Krajicek	2	6	[10]
(Sweden) S Arvidsson (New Zealand) M Erakovic	4	3
(Germany) A-L Grönefeld (United Kingdom) H Watson	6	6
(United States) A Rolle (United States) M Washington	3	6	[5]
2	(Belarus) O Govortsova (Russia) A Kudryavtseva	6	3	[10]

Quarterfinals
1	(Czech Republic) R Voráčová (Czech Republic) B Záhlavová-Strýcová	0	3
(Russia) K Pervak (Turkey) İ Şenoğlu	6	6
4	(Czech Republic) A Hlaváčková (Czech Republic) L Hradecká	6	6
WC	(United States) J Hampton (United States) M Oudin	1	1
(Ukraine) O Savchuk (Georgia (country)) A Tatishvili	1	5
3	(United States) V King (Netherlands) M Krajicek	6	7
(Germany) A-L Grönefeld (United Kingdom) H Watson	4	6	[8]
2	(Belarus) O Govortsova (Russia) A Kudryavtseva	6	4	[10]

Semifinals
(Russia) K Pervak (Turkey) İ Şenoğlu	2	1
4	(Czech Republic) A Hlaváčková (Czech Republic) L Hradecká	6	6
3	(United States) V King (Netherlands) M Krajicek	6	2	[8]
2	(Belarus) O Govortsova (Russia) A Kudryavtseva	3	6	[10]

Finals
4	(Czech Republic) A Hlaváčková (Czech Republic) L Hradecká	3	6	[8]
2	(Belarus) O Govortsova (Russia) A Kudryavtseva	6	4	[10]
