= 2011 Regions Morgan Keegan Championships – Singles =

Singles
- 2011 Regions Morgan Keegan Championships and the Cellular South Cup

Final
- Champion: (United States) Andy Roddick
- Runner-up: (Canada) Milos Raonic
- Score: 7–6^{(9–7)}, 6–7^{(11–13)}, 7–5

Details
- Draw: 32
- Seeds: 8

Events
Singles	men	women
Doubles	men	women
← 2010 ·	Regions Morgan Keegan Championships	· 2012 →
← 2010 ·	Cellular South Cup	· 2012 →

Sam Querrey was the defending champion, but lost to Mardy Fish in the quarterfinals.

Andy Roddick won his third title at this event, and the 30th of his career, defeating Milos Raonic 7–6^{(9–7)}, 6–7^{(11–13)}, 7–5 in the final. Roddick made a diving forehand to break serve for the match on his fifth championship point. Roddick stated: "That's the best shot I've ever hit in my life, considering the circumstance."

== Seeds ==
1. (United States) Andy Roddick (champion)
2. (Spain) Fernando Verdasco (first round)
3. (France) Gaël Monfils (withdrew due to a wrist injury)
4. (United States) Mardy Fish (semifinals)
5. (United States) Sam Querrey (quarterfinals)
6. (United States) John Isner (first round)
7. (Chinese Taipei) Lu Yen-hsun (first round)
8. (South Africa) Kevin Anderson (first round)
9. (Belgium) Xavier Malisse (first round, retired)

== Draw ==
=== Key ===
- Q = Qualifier
- WC = Wild card
- LL = Lucky loser
- Alt = Alternate
- SE = Special exempt
- PR = Protected ranking
- ITF = ITF entry
- JE = Junior exempt
- w/o = Walkover
- r = Retired
- d = Defaulted
- SR = Special ranking

=== Finals ===
Semifinals
1	(United States) Andy Roddick	6	6
WC	(Argentina) Juan Martín del Potro	3	4
4	(United States) Mardy Fish	4	6	3
WC	(Canada) Milos Raonic	6	4	6

Final
1	(United States) Andy Roddick	7	6^{11}	7
WC	(Canada) Milos Raonic	6^{7}	7	5

=== Top half ===
First round
1	(United States) A Roddick	4	6	6
(Lithuania) R Berankis	6	2	3
(Serbia) J Tipsarević	6	7
Q	(United States) R Sweeting	0	6^{7}
(France) A Mannarino	6	6
Q	(Czech Republic) J Hájek	2	2
(Australia) L Hewitt	6	7
7	(Chinese Taipei) Y-h Lu	4	6^{3}
9	(Belgium) X Malisse	2	0	r
(France) F Serra	6	1
Q	(United States) M Russell	6	7
(Croatia) I Karlović	1	6^{1}
(Croatia) I Dodig	3	6	6
(Germany) R Schüttler	6	3	4
WC	(Argentina) JM del Potro	6	6
6	(United States) J Isner	4	3

Second round
1	(United States) A Roddick	6	7
(Serbia) J Tipsarević	1	6^{8}
(France) A Mannarino	7	5	0
(Australia) L Hewitt	6^{9}	7	6
(France) F Serra	4	4
Q	(United States) M Russell	6	6
(Croatia) I Dodig	4	4
WC	(Argentina) JM del Potro	6	6

Quarterfinals
1	(United States) A Roddick	4	6	6
(Australia) L Hewitt	6	3	4
Q	(United States) M Russell	4	2
WC	(Argentina) JM del Potro	6	6

Semifinals
1	(United States) A Roddick	6	6
WC	(Argentina) JM del Potro	3	4

=== Bottom half ===
First round
5	(United States) S Querrey	6^{5}	7	6
(Uzbekistan) D Istomin	7	6^{5}	4
(Argentina) B Dabul	7	6
(Poland) M Przysiężny	5	4
Alt	(Slovakia) L Lacko	6^{4}	7	6
(Israel) D Sela	7	5	3
(Russia) T Gabashvili	1	5
4	(United States) M Fish	6	7
8	(South Africa) K Anderson	7	3	6^{4}
Q	(United States) R Kendrick	5	6	7
(Brazil) R Mello	4	3
WC	(United States) J Blake	6	6
(Germany) B Becker	4	2
(Czech Republic) R Štěpánek	6	6
WC	(Canada) M Raonic	6	3	7
2	(Spain) F Verdasco	4	6	6^{5}

Second round
5	(United States) S Querrey	6	7
(Argentina) B Dabul	3	6^{3}
Alt	(Slovakia) L Lacko	7	4	6^{3}
4	(United States) M Fish	6^{5}	6	7
Q	(United States) R Kendrick	7	6
WC	(United States) J Blake	6^{5}	3
(Czech Republic) R Štěpánek	4	7	6^{1}
WC	(Canada) M Raonic	6	6^{10}	7

Quarterfinals
5	(United States) S Querrey	3	4
4	(United States) M Fish	6	6
Q	(United States) R Kendrick	4	6	3
WC	(Canada) M Raonic	6	3	6

Semifinals
4	(United States) M Fish	4	6	3
WC	(Canada) M Raonic	6	4	6
