= 2013 U.S. National Indoor Tennis Championships – Women's doubles =

Women's doubles
- 2013 U.S. National Indoor Tennis Championships

Final
- Champions: (France) Kristina Mladenovic (Kazakhstan) Galina Voskoboeva
- Runners-up: (Sweden) Sofia Arvidsson (Sweden) Johanna Larsson
- Score: 7–6^{(7–5)}, 6–3

Details
- Draw: 16
- Seeds: 4

Events
Singles	men	women
Doubles	men	women
- U.S. National Indoor Tennis Championships

Andrea Hlaváčková and Lucie Hradecká were the defending champions, but they lost in the first round to Gabriela Dabrowski and Alla Kudryavtseva.
Kristina Mladenovic and Galina Voskoboeva won the title, defeating Sofia Arvidsson and Johanna Larsson in the final, 7–6^{(7–5)}, 6–3.

== Seeds ==
1. (Czech Republic) Andrea Hlaváčková / (Czech Republic) Lucie Hradecká (first round)
2. (France) Kristina Mladenovic / (Kazakhstan) Galina Voskoboeva (champions)
3. (New Zealand) Marina Erakovic / (United Kingdom) Heather Watson (quarterfinals)
4. (Latvia) Līga Dekmeijere / (United States) Megan Moulton-Levy (semifinals)

== Draw ==
Key

- Q = Qualifier
- WC = Wild card
- LL = Lucky loser
- Alt = Alternate
- ITF = ITF entry
- PR = Protected ranking
- SR = Special ranking
- SE = Special exempt
- JE = Junior exempt
- JR = Junior Accelerator Programme entrant
- CO = College Accelerator Programme entrant
- NG = Next Gen Accelerator Program entrant
- w/o = Walkover
- r = Retired
- d = Defaulted

=== Draw ===
First round
1	(Czech Republic) A Hlaváčková (Czech Republic) L Hradecká	6	4	[4]
(Canada) G Dabrowski (Russia) A Kudryavtseva	4	6	[10]
(Sweden) S Arvidsson (Sweden) J Larsson	6	6
(United States) I Falconi (United States) M Sanchez	2	4
4	(Latvia) L Dekmeijere (United States) M Moulton-Levy	6	6
WC	(Germany) S Mikesz (Germany) C Wegner	3	1
(Spain) G Muguruza (Spain) S Soler Espinosa	7^{7}	7^{7}
Alt	(Australia) A Hibberd (United States) T Welcher	6^{3}	6^{4}
(United States) L Lee-Waters (United States) J Pegula	6	6
(Hungary) M Czink (Croatia) M Lučić-Baroni	3	4
Alt	(United States) A Murdock (Ukraine) M Slupska	2	0
3	(New Zealand) M Erakovic (United Kingdom) H Watson	6	6
(Serbia) V Dolonc (Czech Republic) E Hrdinová	6	6
WC	(United States) T Townsend (United States) C Vandeweghe	4	0
(Israel) S Pe'er (South Africa) C Scheepers	3	2
2	(France) K Mladenovic (Kazakhstan) G Voskoboeva	6	6

Quarterfinals
(Canada) G Dabrowski (Russia) A Kudryavtseva	4	6	[8]
(Sweden) S Arvidsson (Sweden) J Larsson	6	2	[10]
4	(Latvia) L Dekmeijere (United States) M Moulton-Levy	6	1	[10]
(Spain) G Muguruza (Spain) S Soler Espinosa	4	6	[8]
(United States) L Lee-Waters (United States) J Pegula	7^{7}	6
3	(New Zealand) M Erakovic (United Kingdom) H Watson	6^{4}	2
(Serbia) V Dolonc (Czech Republic) E Hrdinová	6^{6}	4
2	(France) K Mladenovic (Kazakhstan) G Voskoboeva	7^{8}	6

Semifinals
(Sweden) S Arvidsson (Sweden) J Larsson	4	6	[11]
4	(Latvia) L Dekmeijere (United States) M Moulton-Levy	6	3	[9]
(United States) L Lee-Waters (United States) J Pegula	3	3
2	(France) K Mladenovic (Kazakhstan) G Voskoboeva	6	6

Final
(Sweden) S Arvidsson (Sweden) J Larsson	6^{5}	3
2	(France) K Mladenovic (Kazakhstan) G Voskoboeva	7^{7}	6
