= 2013 U.S. National Indoor Tennis Championships – Men's singles =

Men's singles
- 2013 U.S. National Indoor Tennis Championships

Final
- Champion: (Japan) Kei Nishikori
- Runner-up: (Spain) Feliciano López
- Score: 6–2, 6–3

Details
- Draw: 32
- Seeds: 8

Events
| Singles | men | women |
| Doubles | men | women |
- U.S. National Indoor Championships

Jürgen Melzer was the defending champion, but lost in the first round to Igor Sijsling.
Kei Nishikori won the title, defeating Feliciano López in the final, 6–2, 6–3.

== Seeds ==
1. (Croatia) Marin Čilić (quarterfinals)
2. (Canada) Milos Raonic (first round)
3. (United States) John Isner (first round)
4. (United States) Sam Querrey (second round)
5. (Japan) Kei Nishikori (champion)
6. (Germany) Tommy Haas (second round, withdrew because of a viral illness)
7. (Ukraine) Alexandr Dolgopolov (quarterfinals)
8. (Spain) Fernando Verdasco (withdrew because of a neck injury)

== Draw ==
Key

- Q = Qualifier
- WC = Wild card
- LL = Lucky loser
- Alt = Alternate
- ITF = ITF entry
- PR = Protected ranking
- SR = Special ranking
- SE = Special exempt
- JE = Junior exempt
- JR = Junior Accelerator Programme entrant
- CO = College Accelerator Programme entrant
- NG = Next Gen Accelerator Program entrant
- w/o = Walkover
- r = Retired
- d = Defaulted

=== Finals ===
Semifinals
5 | (Japan) Kei Nishikori | 6 | 0
(Australia) Marinko Matosevic | 4 | 0^{r}
(Uzbekistan) Denis Istomin | 2 | 6 | 3
(Spain) Feliciano López | 6 | 3 | 6

Final
5 | (Japan) Kei Nishikori | 6 | 6
(Spain) Feliciano López | 2 | 3

=== Top half ===
First round
1 | (Croatia) M Čilić | 4 | 6 | 6
(Croatia) I Dodig | 6 | 2 | 3
(Austria) J Melzer | 4 | 6^{3}
(Netherlands) I Sijsling | 6 | 7^{7}
Q | (United States) D Young | 5
(Belgium) X Malisse | 1^{r}
Q | (Ukraine) I Marchenko | 4 | 5
5 | (Japan) K Nishikori | 6 | 7
4 | (United States) S Querrey | 6 | 6
(Colombia) A Falla | 3 | 3
(Japan) G Soeda | 6^{6} | 4
(Australia) M Matosevic | 7^{8} | 6
WC | (United States) S Johnson | 6^{4} | 4
Q | (United States) R Williams | 7^{7} | 6
(Germany) B Phau | 3 | 4
7 | (Ukraine) A Dolgopolov | 6 | 6

Second round
1 | (Croatia) M Čilić | 7^{7} | 3 | 7^{9}
(Netherlands) I Sijsling | 6^{2} | 6 | 6^{7}
Q | (United States) D Young | 3 | 3
5 | (Japan) K Nishikori | 6 | 6
4 | (United States) S Querrey | 6 | 4 | 5
(Australia) M Matosevic | 3 | 6 | 7
Q | (United States) R Williams | 4 | 6 | 4
7 | (Ukraine) A Dolgopolov | 6 | 4 | 6

Quarterfinals
1 | (Croatia) M Čilić | 4 | 2
5 | (Japan) K Nishikori | 6 | 6
(Australia) M Matosevic | 6^{6} | 6 | 6
7 | (Ukraine) A Dolgopolov | 7^{8} | 2 | 4

Semifinals
5 | (Japan) K Nishikori | 6 | 0
(Australia) M Matosevic | 4 | 0^{r}

=== Bottom half ===
First round
Q | (Russia) A Bogomolov Jr. | 2 | 4
LL | (United States) M Russell | 6 | 6
(United States) R Harrison | 4 | 7^{7} | 6^{2}
(Poland) Ł Kubot | 6 | 6^{4} | 7^{7}
(Chinese Taipei) Y-h Lu | 6 | 6^{3} | 4
(Australia) L Hewitt | 2 | 7^{7} | 6
(Uzbekistan) D Istomin | 6 | 6
3 | (United States) J Isner | 4 | 3
6 | (Germany) T Haas | 7^{8} | 6
(Russia) E Donskoy | 6^{6} | 4
(Germany) B Becker | 6 | 3 | 4
(Spain) F López | 4 | 6 | 6
(Germany) F Mayer | 6 | 3 | 2
WC | (United States) J Blake | 4 | 6 | 6
WC | (United States) J Sock | 6 | 5 | 7
2 | (Canada) M Raonic | 3 | 7 | 5

Second round
LL | (United States) M Russell | 6 | 6
(Poland) Ł Kubot | 2 | 4
(Australia) L Hewitt | 1 | 2
(Uzbekistan) D Istomin | 6 | 6
6 | (Germany) T Haas
(Spain) F López | w/o
WC | (United States) J Blake | 5 | 4
WC | (United States) J Sock | 7 | 6

Quarterfinals
LL | (United States) M Russell | 4 | 6^{5}
(Uzbekistan) D Istomin | 6 | 7^{7}
(Spain) F López | 6 | 6
WC | (United States) J Sock | 4 | 3

Semifinals
(Uzbekistan) D Istomin | 2 | 6 | 3
(Spain) F López | 6 | 3 | 6

== Qualifying ==
=== Seeds ===
1. (United States) Michael Russell (qualifying competition, lucky loser)
2. (United States) Tim Smyczek (first round)
3. (Germany) Philipp Petzschner (first round)
4. (Australia) Matthew Ebden (qualifying competition)
5. (Russia) Alex Bogomolov Jr. (qualified)
6. (Canada) Vasek Pospisil (first round)
7. (Ukraine) Illya Marchenko (qualified)
8. (United States) Denis Kudla (first round)

=== Qualifiers ===
1. (United States) Donald Young
2. (United States) Rhyne Williams
3. (Russia) Alex Bogomolov Jr.
4. (Ukraine) Illya Marchenko

=== Lucky losers ===
1. (United States) Michael Russell

=== Draw ===
==== First qualifier ====
First round
1 | (United States) Michael Russell | 7 | 6
WC | (United States) Christian Harrison | 5 | 4
(United States) Donald Young | 6 | 6
8 | (United States) Denis Kudla | 2 | 1

Qualifying competition
1 | (United States) Michael Russell | 6 | 3 | 6^{7}
(United States) Donald Young | 4 | 6 | 7^{9}

==== Second qualifier ====
First round
2 | (United States) Tim Smyczek | 6 | 1 | 2
(United States) Rhyne Williams | 2 | 6 | 6
(Spain) Daniel Muñoz de la Nava | 6 | 7^{7}
6 | (Canada) Vasek Pospisil | 4 | 6^{3}

Qualifying competition
(United States) Rhyne Williams | 7^{7} | 6
(Spain) Daniel Muñoz de la Nava | 6^{4} | 4

==== Third qualifier ====
First round
3 | (Germany) Philipp Petzschner | 1 | 6^{6}
(Croatia) Ivo Karlović | 6 | 7^{8}
(United States) Sekou Bangoura | 5 | 1
5 | (Russia) Alex Bogomolov Jr. | 7 | 6

Qualifying competition
(Croatia) Ivo Karlović | 3 | 6 | 4
5 | (Russia) Alex Bogomolov Jr. | 6 | 3 | 6

==== Fourth qualifier ====
First round
4 | (Australia) Matthew Ebden | 6 | 6
WC | (United Kingdom) Connor Glennon | 3 | 4
(Kazakhstan) Andrey Golubev | 6^{4} | 6 | 6^{4}
7 | (Ukraine) Illya Marchenko | 7^{7} | 2 | 7^{7}

Qualifying competition
4 | (Australia) Matthew Ebden | 6 | 3 | 1
7 | (Ukraine) Illya Marchenko | 4 | 6 | 6
