= 2014 U.S. National Indoor Tennis Championships – Singles =

Singles
- 2014 U.S. National Indoor Tennis Championships

Final
- Champion: (Japan) Kei Nishikori
- Runner-up: (Croatia) Ivo Karlović
- Score: 6–4, 7–6^{(7–0)}

Details
- Draw: 32
- Seeds: 8

Events
Singles	Doubles
- U.S. National Indoor Championships

Kei Nishikori was the defending champion and successfully defended his title, defeating Ivo Karlović in the final, 6–4, 7–6^{(7–0)}.

== Seeds ==
The top four seeds receive a bye into the second round.

1. (Japan) Kei Nishikori (champion)
2. (Spain) Feliciano López (second round)
3. (Australia) Lleyton Hewitt (quarterfinals)
4. (Chinese Taipei) Lu Yen-hsun (semifinals, retired)

5. (Australia) Marinko Matosevic (first round)
6. (United States) Sam Querrey (first round)
7. (Poland) Michał Przysiężny (first round)
8. (Kazakhstan) Mikhail Kukushkin (second round)

== Draw ==
Key

- Q = Qualifier
- WC = Wild card
- LL = Lucky loser
- Alt = Alternate
- ITF = ITF entry
- PR = Protected ranking
- SR = Special ranking
- SE = Special exempt
- JE = Junior exempt
- JR = Junior Accelerator Programme entrant
- CO = College Accelerator Programme entrant
- NG = Next Gen Accelerator Program entrant
- w/o = Walkover
- r = Retired
- d = Defaulted

=== Finals ===
Semifinals
1/WC	(Japan) Kei Nishikori	6	6
(United States) Michael Russell	3	2
4	(Chinese Taipei) Lu Yen-hsun	1	0^{r}
(Croatia) Ivo Karlović	6	0

Final
1/WC	(Japan) Kei Nishikori	6	7^{7}
(Croatia) Ivo Karlović	4	6^{0}

=== Top half ===
First round
(Slovakia) L Lacko	3	2
(Germany) B Becker	6	6
SE	(Germany) B Phau	3	4
(United States) R Harrison	6	6
(Russia) A Bogomolov Jr.	2	6	7^{9}
6	(United States) S Querrey	6	4	6^{7}
WC	(Cyprus) M Baghdatis	6	6
Q	(United States) R Ram	3	4
WC	(Australia) N Kyrgios	7^{7}	4	3
(United States) T Smyczek	6^{5}	6	6
(United States) M Russell	3	6	6
7	(Poland) M Przysiężny	6	3	1

Second round
1/WC	(Japan) K Nishikori	6	6
(Germany) B Becker	4	4
(United States) R Harrison	3	6	2
(Russia) A Bogomolov Jr.	6	2	6
3	(Australia) L Hewitt	1	6	6
WC	(Cyprus) M Baghdatis	6	2	0
(United States) T Smyczek	2	6^{5}
(United States) M Russell	6	7^{7}

Quarterfinals
1/WC	(Japan) K Nishikori	3	6	6
(Russia) A Bogomolov Jr.	6	3	2
3	(Australia) L Hewitt	3	6^{6}
(United States) M Russell	6	7^{8}

Semifinals
1/WC	(Japan) K Nishikori	6	6
(United States) M Russell	3	2

=== Bottom half ===
First round
8	(Kazakhstan) M Kukushkin	7^{11}	7
(Russia) T Gabashvili	6^{9}	5
Q	(United States) A Kuznetsov	6	6
Q	(Belgium) D Goffin	4	3
Q	(United States) D Kudla	6	6
(United States) D Young	1	1
5	(Australia) M Matosevic	3	2
(Czech Republic) J Veselý	6	6
(United States) J Sock	7	1	7^{7}
(France) A Mannarino	5	6	6^{5}
(Australia) M Ebden	5	4
(Croatia) I Karlović	7	6

Second round
8	(Kazakhstan) M Kukushkin	6	3	6^{1}
Q	(United States) A Kuznetsov	2	6	7^{7}
Q	(United States) D Kudla	6	3	3
4	(Chinese Taipei) Y-h Lu	3	6	6
(Czech Republic) J Veselý	2	1
(United States) J Sock	6	6
(Croatia) I Karlović	7^{7}	6
2	(Spain) F López	6^{2}	4

Quarterfinals
Q	(United States) A Kuznetsov	1	4
4	(Chinese Taipei) Y-h Lu	6	6
(United States) J Sock	6^{4}	7^{7}	3
(Croatia) I Karlović	7^{7}	6^{3}	6

Semifinals
4	(Chinese Taipei) Y-h Lu	1	0^{r}
(Croatia) I Karlović	6	0

== Qualifying ==
=== Seeds ===
1. (Belgium) David Goffin (qualified)
2. (United States) Denis Kudla (qualified)
3. (United States) Alex Kuznetsov (qualified)
4. (Dominican Republic) Víctor Estrella Burgos (qualifying competition)
5. (United States) Rajeev Ram (qualified)
6. (Portugal) Gastão Elias (qualifying competition)
7. (United States) Bobby Reynolds (qualifying competition)
8. (Republic of Ireland) James McGee (qualifying competition)

=== Qualifiers ===
1. (Belgium) David Goffin
2. (United States) Denis Kudla
3. (United States) Alex Kuznetsov
4. (United States) Rajeev Ram

=== Qualifying draw ===
==== First qualifier ====
First round
1	(Belgium) David Goffin	6	6
(United States) Dennis Nevolo	2	2
(Belgium) Cedric Dezutter	2	1
(United States) Robby Ginepri	6	6
(Mexico) Santiago González	3	5
(United States) Dennis Novikov	6	7
(United States) Scott Lipsky	3	0
8	(Republic of Ireland) James McGee	6	6

Second round
1	(Belgium) David Goffin	1	6	6
(United States) Robby Ginepri	6	1	4
(United States) Dennis Novikov	3	7^{7}	4
8	(Republic of Ireland) James McGee	6	6^{5}	6

Qualifying competition
1	(Belgium) David Goffin	6	7
8	(Republic of Ireland) James McGee	1	5

==== Second qualifier ====
First round
2	(United States) Denis Kudla	6	6
(Zimbabwe) Takanyi Garanganga	2	3
(Bulgaria) Dimitar Kutrovsky	6	2	1
(United States) Jason Jung	0	6	6
(United Kingdom) Joe Salisbury	7^{7}	6
(Dominican Republic) José Hernández	6^{3}	1
(United States) Evan King	6^{5}	1
6	(Portugal) Gastão Elias	7^{7}	6

Second round
2	(United States) Denis Kudla	6	7
(United States) Jason Jung	2	5
(United Kingdom) Joe Salisbury	3	1
6	(Portugal) Gastão Elias	6	6

Qualifying competition
2	(United States) Denis Kudla	7^{7}	6
6	(Portugal) Gastão Elias	6^{1}	4

==== Third qualifier ====
First round
3	(United States) Alex Kuznetsov	6	6
WC	(United States) Ian Chadwell	1	0
(Poland) Tomasz Bednarek	0	6^{5}
(United States) Sekou Bangoura	6	7^{7}
WC	(United Kingdom) Connor Glennon	6	6
WC	(United Kingdom) David O'Leary	1	2
(Zimbabwe) Takura Happy	0	0
7	(United States) Bobby Reynolds	6	6

Second round
3	(United States) Alex Kuznetsov	6	6
(United States) Sekou Bangoura	4	4
WC	(United Kingdom) Connor Glennon	0	4
7	(United States) Bobby Reynolds	6	6

Qualifying competition
3	(United States) Alex Kuznetsov	6	7
7	(United States) Bobby Reynolds	3	5

==== Fourth qualifier ====
First round
4	(Dominican Republic) Víctor Estrella Burgos	7^{7}	6
(South Africa) Dean O'Brien	6^{2}	4
WC	(Republic of Ireland) David O'Hare	4	4
(Mexico) Miguel Ángel Reyes-Varela	6	6
WC	(Spain) Joan-Marc Grimal-Ferrer	7^{8}	6
(Czech Republic) František Čermák	6^{6}	1
(Germany) Frank Moser	6^{3}	3
5	(United States) Rajeev Ram	7^{7}	6

Second round
4	(Dominican Republic) Víctor Estrella Burgos	7	6
(Mexico) Miguel Ángel Reyes-Varela	5	4
WC	(Spain) Joan-Marc Grimal-Ferrer	2	4
5	(United States) Rajeev Ram	6	6

Qualifying competition
4	(Dominican Republic) Víctor Estrella Burgos	3	7^{7}	4
5	(United States) Rajeev Ram	6	6^{1}	6
