= 2012 Memphis International – Singles =

Singles
- 2012 Regions Morgan Keegan Championships and the Cellular South Cup

Final
- Champion: (Sweden) Sofia Arvidsson
- Runner-up: (New Zealand) Marina Erakovic
- Score: 6–3, 6–4

Details
- Draw: 32
- Seeds: 8

Events
Singles	men	women
Doubles	men	women
- Regions Morgan Keegan Championships Cellular South Cup

Magdaléna Rybáriková is the defending champion, but she lost in the first round to the American qualifier Jamie Hampton.

Sofia Arvidsson won the title by defeating Marina Erakovic 6–3, 6–4 in the final. This was Arvidsson's second WTA title, with her first title won at the same event six years ago.

== Seeds ==
1. (Russia) Nadia Petrova (first round)
2. (Kazakhstan) Ksenia Pervak (second round)
3. (Czech Republic) Lucie Hradecká (second round)
4. (New Zealand) Marina Erakovic (final)
5. (France) Pauline Parmentier (second round)
6. (United Kingdom) Elena Baltacha (first round)
7. (Sweden) Johanna Larsson (second round)
8. (Slovakia) Magdaléna Rybáriková (first round)

== Draw ==
Key

- Q = Qualifier
- WC = Wild card
- LL = Lucky loser
- Alt = Alternate
- ITF = ITF entry
- PR = Protected ranking
- SR = Special ranking
- SE = Special exempt
- JE = Junior exempt
- JR = Junior Accelerator Programme entrant
- CO = College Accelerator Programme entrant
- NG = Next Gen Accelerator Program entrant
- w/o = Walkover
- r = Retired
- d = Defaulted

=== Finals ===
Semifinals
(Russia) Vera Dushevina	1	6	4
4	(New Zealand) Marina Erakovic	6	4	6
(Sweden) Sofia Arvidsson	6	7
(Italy) Alberta Brianti	3	5

Final
4	(New Zealand) Marina Erakovic	3	4
(Sweden) Sofia Arvidsson	6	6

=== Top half ===
First round
1	(Russia) N Petrova	4	2
Q	(Italy) C Giorgi	6	6
WC	(United States) M Oudin	2	3
(France) S Foretz Gacon	6	6
WC	(United States) M Keys	2	5
(Russia) V Dushevina	6	7
Q	(United States) J Hampton	7^{9}	6
8	(Slovakia) M Rybáriková	6^{7}	0
4	(New Zealand) M Erakovic	4	6	6
(United States) S Stephens	6	0	1
(Russia) E Rodina	6	6
(United States) I Falconi	1	3
(Belarus) O Govortsova	6	7
(Russia) V Dolonts	1	5
(Netherlands) M Krajicek	6	6
6	(United Kingdom) E Baltacha	2	1

Second round
Q	(Italy) C Giorgi	5	4
(France) S Foretz Gacon	7	6
(Russia) V Dushevina	6	6
Q	(United States) J Hampton	4	3
4	(New Zealand) M Erakovic	6	6
(Russia) E Rodina	3	4
(Belarus) O Govortsova	6^{2}	3
(Netherlands) M Krajicek	7^{7}	6

Quarterfinals
(France) S Foretz Gacon	6	3	1
(Russia) V Dushevina	3	6	6
4	(New Zealand) M Erakovic	6	6^{2}	6
(Netherlands) M Krajicek	4	7^{7}	4

Semifinals
(Russia) V Dushevina	1	6	4
4	(New Zealand) M Erakovic	6	4	6

=== Bottom half ===
First round
5	(France) P Parmentier	6	4	6
(Czech Republic) A Hlaváčková	4	6	2
(United Kingdom) H Watson	2	3
(Sweden) S Arvidsson	6	6
Q	(United States) A Glatch	6	6^{5}	2
(Ukraine) L Tsurenko	2	7^{7}	6
(Georgia (country)) A Tatishvili	3	1
3	(Czech Republic) L Hradecká	6	6
7	(Sweden) J Larsson	4	6	7
Q	(France) I Pavlovic	6	4	5
WC	(United States) L Davis	5	3
(United States) V Lepchenko	7	6
(Italy) A Brianti	7^{7}	5	6
(Croatia) M Lučić	6^{5}	7	1
(Canada) R Marino	2	4
2	(Kazakhstan) K Pervak	6	6

Second round
5	(France) P Parmentier	6^{5}	6	3
(Sweden) S Arvidsson	7^{7}	0	6
(Ukraine) L Tsurenko	3	6	7^{7}
3	(Czech Republic) L Hradecká	6	4	6^{3}
7	(Sweden) J Larsson	2	4
(United States) V Lepchenko	6	6
(Italy) A Brianti	7^{7}	6
2	(Kazakhstan) K Pervak	6^{3}	2

Quarterfinals
(Sweden) S Arvidsson	6	7^{11}
(Ukraine) L Tsurenko	2	6^{9}
(United States) V Lepchenko	5	3
(Italy) A Brianti	7	6

Semifinals
(Sweden) S Arvidsson	6	7
(Italy) A Brianti	3	5

== Qualifying ==
=== Seeds ===
1. (United States) Jamie Hampton (qualified)
2. (United States) Alexa Glatch (qualified)
3. (United States) Julia Cohen (first round)
4. (Italy) Camila Giorgi (qualified)
5. (United States) Julia Boserup (first round)
6. (United States) Chichi Scholl (qualifying competition)
7. (France) Victoria Larrière (qualifying competition)
8. (United States) Madison Brengle (qualifying competition)

=== Qualifiers ===
1. (United States) Jamie Hampton
2. (United States) Alexa Glatch
3. (France) Irena Pavlovic
4. (Italy) Camila Giorgi

=== Draw ===
==== First qualifier ====
First round
1	(United States) Jamie Hampton	5	6	7
(United States) Ashley Weinhold	7	1	5
(Italy) Nastassja Burnett	6	6
5	(United States) Julia Boserup	1	1

Qualifying competition
1	(United States) Jamie Hampton	4	6	6
(Italy) Nastassja Burnett	6	4	3

==== Second qualifier ====
First round
2	(United States) Alexa Glatch	6	6
(Serbia) Aleksandra Krunić	2	3
(Ukraine) Irina Buryachok	2	2
8	(United States) Madison Brengle	6	6

Qualifying competition
2	(United States) Alexa Glatch	1	6	6
8	(United States) Madison Brengle	6	3	4

==== Third qualifier ====
First round
3	(United States) Julia Cohen	0	1
(France) Irena Pavlovic	6	6
WC	(United States) Gabrielle Andrews	5	5
7	(France) Victoria Larrière	7	7

Qualifying competition
(France) Irena Pavlovic	6	6
7	(France) Victoria Larrière	2	2

==== Fourth qualifier ====
First round
4	(Italy) Camila Giorgi	6	6
(United Kingdom) Naomi Broady	2	1
WC	(United States) Catherine Harrison	4	4
6	(United States) Chichi Scholl	6	6

Qualifying competition
4	(Italy) Camila Giorgi	6	6
6	(United States) Chichi Scholl	2	4
