= 2010 Davis Cup Americas Zone Group I =

International tennis competition

The Americas Zone is one of the three zones of regional Davis Cup competition in 2010.

In the Americas Zone there are four different groups in which teams compete against each other to advance to the next group.

== Participating teams ==
=== Seeds ===
1. Brazil
2. Colombia

=== Other nations ===
- Canada
- Dominican Republic
- Uruguay

== Draw ==
Second-round play-offs
Toronto, Canada (hard)
(Dominican Republic) Dominican Rep.	0
Canada	5

First-round play-offs
bye
(Dominican Republic) Dominican Rep.
Canada
bye

First Round
1	Brazil
bye
Santo Domingo, Dominican Rep. (hard)
(Dominican Republic) Dominican Rep.	1
Uruguay	4
bye
Canada
bye
2	Colombia

Second Round
Bauru, Brazil (clay)
1	Brazil	5
Uruguay	0
5–7 March – Bogotá, Colombia (clay)
Canada	1
2	Colombia	4

- Dominican Republic relegated to Group II in 2011.
- Colombia and Braziladvance to World Group play-off.

== First Round Matches ==
=== Dominican Republic vs. Uruguay ===
Dominican Republic
1
Federacion Dominicana De Tenis, Santo Domingo, Dominican Republic
5–7 March 2010
Hard (outdoor)

Uruguay
4

			1	2	3	4	5
1	(Dominican Republic) (Uruguay)	José Hernández; Pablo Cuevas	2; 6	5; 7	3; 6
2	(Dominican Republic) (Uruguay)	Víctor Estrella; Marcel Felder	6; 0	6; 3	4; 6	3; 6	2; 6
3	(Dominican Republic) (Uruguay)	Víctor Estrella / Jhonson García; Pablo Cuevas / Marcel Felder	6^{2} 7^{7}	6^{5} 7^{7}	3; 6
4	(Dominican Republic) (Uruguay)	Jhonson García; Martín Cuevas	6; 1	6; 2
5	(Dominican Republic) (Uruguay)	Jesús Francisco Félix; Ariel Behar	4; 6	7^{7} 6^{3}	2; 6

== Second Round Matches ==
=== Brazil vs. Uruguay ===
Brazil
5
Bauru Tenis Clube, Bauru, Brazil
7–9 May 2010
Clay (outdoor)

Uruguay
0

			1	2	3	4	5
1	(Brazil) (Uruguay)	Marcos Daniel; Marcel Felder	6; 4	6; 1	6; 1
2	(Brazil) (Uruguay)	Thomaz Bellucci; Martín Cuevas	6; 4	6; 3	6; 2
3	(Brazil) (Uruguay)	Marcelo Melo / Bruno Soares; Ariel Behar / Marcel Felder	6; 3	6; 2	7^{7} 6^{4}
4	(Brazil) (Uruguay)	Thomaz Bellucci; Marcel Felder	6; 4	6; 1
5	(Brazil) (Uruguay)	Marcelo Melo; Martín Cuevas	6^{5} 7^{7}	6; 2	7; 5

=== Colombia vs. Canada ===
Colombia
4
Club Campestre El Rancho, Bogotá, Colombia
5–7 March 2010
Clay (outdoor)

Canada
1

			1	2	3	4	5
1	(Colombia) (Canada)	Carlos Salamanca; Peter Polansky	6; 4	6; 3	6; 2
2	(Colombia) (Canada)	Santiago Giraldo; Milos Raonic	7; 5	4; 6	6; 4	6; 4
3	(Colombia) (Canada)	Juan Sebastián Cabal / Alejandro Falla; Daniel Nestor / Milos Raonic	6^{4} 7^{7}	6^{3} 7^{7}	7; 5	3; 6
4	(Colombia) (Canada)	Santiago Giraldo; Steven Diez	6; 3	6; 3	6; 3
5	(Colombia) (Canada)	Juan Sebastián Cabal; Milos Raonic	6^{6} 7^{8}	6; 3	6; 4

== Second-round play-offs ==
=== Dominican Republic vs. Canada ===
Dominican Republic
0
Rexall Centre, Toronto, Canada
17–19 September 2010
Hard (outdoor)

Canada
5

			1	2	3	4	5
1	(Dominican Republic) (Canada)	Jhonson García; Peter Polansky	6^{4} 7^{7}	6; 4	3; 6	3; 6
2	(Dominican Republic) (Canada)	Víctor Estrella; Milos Raonic	7; 5	2; 6	6; 3	6^{3} 7^{7}	7; 9
3	(Dominican Republic) (Canada)	Víctor Estrella / Jhonson García; Frank Dancevic / Daniel Nestor	3; 6	4; 6	3; 6
4	(Dominican Republic) (Canada)	Víctor Estrella; Peter Polansky	1; 6	2; 6
5	(Dominican Republic) (Canada)	Luis Delgado; Frank Dancevic	1; 6	0; 6
