= 2012 Regions Morgan Keegan Championships and Memphis International =

Tennis tournament

- Date: February 17–26
- Edition: 37th (men) / 27th (women)
- Category: ATP World Tour 500; WTA International
- Surface: Hard
- Location: Memphis, Tennessee, US
- Venue: Racquet Club of Memphis

Champions

Men's singles
- (Austria) Jürgen Melzer

Women's singles
- (Sweden) Sofia Arvidsson

Men's doubles
- (Belarus) Max Mirnyi / (Canada) Daniel Nestor

Women's doubles
- (Czech Republic) Andrea Hlaváčková / (Czech Republic) Lucie Hradecká
← 2011 ·	Regions Morgan Keegan Championships	· 2013 →
← 2011 ·	Memphis International	· 2013 →

The 2012 Regions Morgan Keegan Championships and the Memphis International was an ATP World Tour and WTA Tour event held at the hardcourts of the Racquet Club of Memphis in Memphis, Tennessee, US. It was the 37th edition of the Regions Morgan Keegan Championships and the 27th edition of the Memphis WTA International Event. The Regions Morgan Keegan Championships was part of the ATP World Tour 500 series on the 2012 ATP World Tour, and the Cellular South Cup was an International-level tournament on the 2012 WTA Tour. The event took place from February 17 to February 26, 2012. Jürgen Melzer and Sofia Arvidsson won the singles titles.

== ATP singles main draw entrants ==
=== Seeds ===
Country	Player	Rank^{1}	Seeds
USA	John Isner	14	1
USA	Andy Roddick	17	2
CZE	Radek Štěpánek	29	3
CAN	Milos Raonic	32	4
RUS	Alex Bogomolov, Jr.	33	5
FRA	Julien Benneteau	34	6
RSA	Kevin Anderson	35	7
AUS	Bernard Tomic	36	8

- ^{1} Rankings as of February 13, 2012

=== Other entrants ===
The following players received wildcards into the main draw:

- (United States) Ryan Harrison
- (United States) Sam Querrey
- (United States) Jack Sock

The following players received entry from the qualifying draw:

- (United States) Robby Ginepri
- (United States) Robert Kendrick
- (United States) Jesse Levine
- (United States) Bobby Reynolds

== ATP doubles main draw entrants ==
=== Seeds ===
Country	Player	Country	Player	Rank^{1}	Seed
BLR	Max Mirnyi	CAN	Daniel Nestor	6	1
AUT	Jürgen Melzer	GER	Philipp Petzschner	30	2
CZE	František Čermák	SVK	Filip Polášek	41	3
MEX	Santiago González	GER	Christopher Kas	42	4

- ^{1} Rankings are as of February 13, 2012

=== Other entrants ===
The following pairs received wildcards into the doubles main draw:

- (United States) Ryan Harrison / (United States) Denis Kudla
- (United States) Ryan Sweeting / (Australia) Bernard Tomic

== WTA singles main draw entrants ==
=== Seeds ===
Country	Player	Rank^{1}	Seeds
RUS	Nadia Petrova	32	1
KAZ	Ksenia Pervak	44	2
CZE	Lucie Hradecká	52	3
NZL	Marina Erakovic	58	4
FRA	Pauline Parmentier	59	5
GBR	Elena Baltacha	61	6
SWE	Johanna Larsson	62	7
SVK	Magdalena Rybáriková	65	8

- ^{1} Rankings as of February 13, 2012

=== Other entrants ===
The following players received wildcards into the main draw:

- (United States) Lauren Davis
- (United States) Madison Keys
- (United States) Melanie Oudin

The following players received entry from the qualifying draw:

- (Italy) Camila Giorgi
- (United States) Alexa Glatch
- (United States) Jamie Hampton
- (France) Irena Pavlovic

== WTA doubles main draw entrants ==
=== Seeds ===
Country	Player	Country	Player	Rank^{1}	Seed
CZE	Andrea Hlaváčková	CZE	Lucie Hradecká	21	1
RUS	Vera Dushevina	BLR	Olga Govortsova	105	2
LAT	Līga Dekmeijere	RUS	Nadia Petrova	106	3
NED	Michaëlla Krajicek	GEO	Anna Tatishvili	163	4

- ^{1} Rankings are as of February 13, 2012

=== Other entrants ===
The following pairs received wildcards into the doubles main draw:

- (United States) Lauren Davis / (United States) Madison Keys
- (Australia) Alyssa Hibberd / (United States) Tiffany Welcher

The following pair received entry as alternates:

- (Germany) Stefanie Mikesz / (Ukraine) Mariya Slupska

=== Withdrawals ===
- (United States) Alexa Glatch (left Achilles tendon injury)

=== Retirements ===
- (Kazakhstan) Ksenia Pervak (viral illness)
- (Russia) Nadia Petrova (left thigh injury)

== Finals ==
=== Men's singles ===
(Austria) Jürgen Melzer defeated (Canada) Milos Raonic, 7–5, 7–6(4)

=== Women's singles ===
(Sweden) Sofia Arvidsson defeated (New Zealand) Marina Erakovic, 6–3, 6–4

- This was Arvidsson's second WTA title, with her first title won at the same event six years ago.

=== Men's doubles ===
(Belarus) Max Mirnyi / (Canada) Daniel Nestor defeated (Croatia) Ivan Dodig / (Brazil) Marcelo Melo, 4–6, 7–5, [10–7]

=== Women's doubles ===
(Czech Republic) Andrea Hlaváčková / (Czech Republic) Lucie Hradecká defeated (Russia) Vera Dushevina / (Belarus) Olga Govortsova, 6–3, 6–4

== Sources ==
- ATP Singles draw
- ATP Doubles draw
- WTA Draws
