= 2013 U.S. National Indoor Tennis Championships =

- Date: February 17–24
- Edition: 38th (Men) / 28th (Women)
- Category: ATP World Tour 500; WTA International
- Draw: 32S / 16D
- Prize money: $1,353,550 $235,000
- Surface: Hard
- Location: Memphis, United States

Champions

Men's singles
- (Japan) Kei Nishikori

Women's singles
- (New Zealand) Marina Erakovic

Men's doubles
- (United States) Bob Bryan / (United States) Mike Bryan

Women's doubles
- (France) Kristina Mladenovic / (Kazakhstan) Galina Voskoboeva
- U.S. National Indoor Tennis Championships

The 2013 U.S. National Indoor Tennis Championships was an ATP World Tour and WTA Tour event held at the hardcourts of the Racquet Club of Memphis in Memphis, Tennessee, United States. It was the 38th edition of the U.S. National Indoor Tennis Championships and the 28th edition of the Memphis WTA International Event. The U.S. National Indoor Tennis Championships is part of the ATP World Tour 500 series on the 2013 ATP World Tour, and the Memphis International is an International-level tournament on the 2013 WTA Tour. The event took place from February 17 to February 24, 2013. Kei Nishikori and Marina Erakovic won the singles titles.

== Finals ==
=== Men's singles ===
- (Japan) Kei Nishikori defeated (Spain) Feliciano López, 6–2, 6–3

=== Women's singles ===
- (New Zealand) Marina Erakovic defeated (Germany) Sabine Lisicki, 6–1, ret.

=== Men's doubles ===
- (United States) Bob Bryan / (United States) Mike Bryan defearted (United States) James Blake / (United States) Jack Sock, 6–1, 6–2

=== Women's doubles ===
- (France) Kristina Mladenovic / (Kazakhstan) Galina Voskoboeva defeated (Sweden) Sofia Arvidsson / (Sweden) Johanna Larsson, 7–6^{(7–5)}, 6–3

== Points and prize money ==
=== Point distribution ===
Event	W	F	SF	QF	Round of 16	Round of 32	Q	Q2	Q1
Men's singles	500	300	180	90	45	0	20	10	0
Men's doubles	500	300	180	90	0	—N/a	—N/a	—N/a	—N/a
Women's singles	280	200	130	70	30	1	10	6	1
Women's doubles	280	200	130	70	1	—N/a	—N/a	—N/a	—N/a

=== Prize money ===
Event	W	F	SF	QF	Round of 16	Round of 32	Q2	Q1
Men's singles	$291,800	$131,560	$62,320	$30,070	$15,330	$8,435	$950	$525
Men's doubles *	$86,200	$38,900	$18,340	$8,860	$4,550	—N/a	—N/a	—N/a
Women's singles	$40,000	$20,000	$10,725	$5,800	$3,200	$2,075	$1,200	$700
Women's doubles *	$11,500	$6,000	$3,200	$1,700	$900	—N/a	—N/a	—N/a

_{* per team}

== ATP singles main-draw entrants ==
=== Seeds ===
Country	Player	Ranking^{1}	Seed
CRO	Marin Čilić	12	1
CAN	Milos Raonic	13	2
USA	John Isner	16	3
USA	Sam Querrey	20	4
JPN	Kei Nishikori	21	5
GER	Tommy Haas	22	6
UKR	Alexandr Dolgopolov	23	7
ESP	~~Fernando Verdasco~~	~~24~~	~~8~~

- ^{1} Rankings as of February 11, 2013.

=== Other entrants ===
The following players received wildcards into the main draw:

- (United States) James Blake
- (United States) Steve Johnson
- (United States) Jack Sock

The following players received entry from the qualifying draw:

- (Russia) Alex Bogomolov Jr.
- (Ukraine) Illya Marchenko
- (United States) Rhyne Williams
- (United States) Donald Young

The following player received entry as a lucky loser:

- (United States) Michael Russell

=== Withdrawals ===
Before the tournament

- (South Africa) Kevin Anderson (elbow injury)
- (United States) Brian Baker (knee injury)
- (United States) Mardy Fish (heart problems)
- (Slovenia) Blaž Kavčič
- (Slovakia) Lukáš Lacko
- (Spain) Fernando Verdasco (neck injury)

During the tournament

- (Germany) Tommy Haas (illness)

=== Retirements ===
- (Belgium) Xavier Malisse (back injury)
- (Australia) Marinko Matosevic (foot injury)

== ATP doubles main-draw entrants ==
=== Seeds ===
Country	Player	Country	Player	Rank^{1}	Seed
USA	Bob Bryan	USA	Mike Bryan	3	1
BLR	Max Mirnyi	ROU	Horia Tecău	14	2
POL	Łukasz Kubot	CAN	Daniel Nestor	36	3
AUT	Alexander Peya	BRA	Bruno Soares	42	4

- ^{1} Rankings are as of February 11, 2013.

=== Other entrants ===
The following pairs received wildcard into the doubles main draw:

- (United States) James Blake / (United States) Jack Sock
- (United States) Christian Harrison / (United States) Ryan Harrison

The following pairs received entry as alternates:

- (Czech Republic) Jaroslav Levinský / (Chinese Taipei) Yen-Hsun Lu
- (Belgium) Xavier Malisse / (Australia) Marinko Matosevic

=== Withdrawals ===
Before the tournament

- (United States) John Isner (knee injury)
- (Spain) Fernando Verdasco (neck injury)

== WTA singles main-draw entrants ==
=== Seeds ===
Country	Player	Ranking^{1}	Seed
BEL	Kirsten Flipkens	34	1
SWE	Sofia Arvidsson	38	2
GER	Sabine Lisicki	40	3
GBR	Heather Watson	41	4
CZE	Lucie Hradecká	52	5
RSA	Chanelle Scheepers	59	6
SVK	Magdaléna Rybáriková	61	7
FRA	Kristina Mladenovic	64	8

- ^{1} Rankings as of February 11, 2013.

=== Other entrants ===
The following players received wildcards into the main draw:

- (United States) Courtney Collins
- (United States) Victoria Duval
- (Spain) Garbiñe Muguruza

The following players received entry from the qualifying draw:

- (Slovakia) Jana Čepelová
- (France) Claire Feuerstein
- (United States) Madison Keys
- (United States) Maria Sanchez

=== Withdrawals ===
Before the tournament

- (Georgia (country)) Anna Tatishvili

=== Retirements ===
- (Germany) Sabine Lisicki (gastrointestinal illness)

== WTA doubles main-draw entrants ==
=== Seeds ===
Country	Player	Country	Player	Rank^{1}	Seed
CZE	Andrea Hlaváčková	CZE	Lucie Hradecká	7	1
FRA	Kristina Mladenovic	KAZ	Galina Voskoboeva	71	2
NZL	Marina Erakovic	GBR	Heather Watson	115	3
LAT	Līga Dekmeijere	USA	Megan Moulton-Levy	140	4

- ^{1} Rankings as of February 11, 2013.

=== Other entrants ===
The following pairs received wildcard into the doubles main draw:

- (Germany) Stefanie Mikesz / (Germany) Caroline Wegner
- (United States) Taylor Townsend / (United States) CoCo Vandeweghe

The following pairs received entry as alternates:

- (Australia) Alyssa Hibberd / (United States) Tiffany Welcher
- (United States) Ashley Murdock / (Ukraine) Mariya Słupska

=== Withdrawals ===
Before the tournament

- (Kazakhstan) Ksenia Pervak (low back injury)
- (Russia) Valeria Savinykh (right shoulder injury)
