= 1992 Nichirei International Championships – Doubles =

Doubles
- 1992 Nichirei International Championships

Final
- Champions: (United States) Mary Joe Fernández (United States) Robin White
- Runners-up: (Indonesia) Yayuk Basuki (Japan) Nana Miyagi
- Score: 6–4, 6–4

Events
Singles	Doubles
← 1991 ·	Nichirei International Championships	· 1993 →

Mary Joe Fernández and Pam Shriver were the defending champions, but Shriver did not compete this year.

Fernández teamed up with Robin White and successfully defended her title, by defeating Yayuk Basuki and Nana Miyagi 6–4, 6–4 in the final.

== Seeds ==
1. (United States) Mary Joe Fernández / (United States) Robin White (champions)
2. (United States) Sandy Collins / (Japan) Kimiko Date (first round)
3. (Indonesia) Yayuk Basuki / (Japan) Nana Miyagi (final)
4. (United States) Amy Frazier / (Japan) Rika Hiraki (semifinals)

== Draw ==
=== Key ===
- Q = Qualifier
- WC = Wild card
- LL = Lucky loser
- Alt = Alternate
- SE = Special exempt
- PR = Protected ranking
- ITF = ITF entry
- JE = Junior exempt
- w/o = Walkover
- r = Retired
- d = Defaulted
- SR = Special ranking

=== Draw ===
First round
1	(United States) MJ Fernández (United States) R White	6	2	6
(United States) S McCarthy (United States) K Po	3	6	3
(United States) A Grossman (Japan) N Sawamatsu	6	4	4
(Japan) E Iida (Japan) M Kidowaki	1	6	6
4	(United States) A Frazier (Japan) R Hiraki	6	6
(Australia) J Byrne (Australia) L Field	1	4
(Australia) KA Guse (Japan) M Yokobori	4	6	1
(Japan) A Hirose (Japan) Y Kamio	6	3	6
(Japan) N Kijimuta (Japan) M Miyauchi	2	6	6
(United States) D Faber (United States) E Rossides	6	1	4
(United States) S Stafford (United States) M Werdel	2	5
3	(Indonesia) Y Basuki (Japan) N Miyagi	6	7
WC	(Japan) M Donoshiro (Japan) Y Tanaka	6	6
Q	(Japan) E Okagawa (Japan) Y Koizumi	4	2
(United States) C MacGregor (New Zealand) J Richardson	6	7^{7}
2	(United States) S Collins (Japan) K Date	4	6^{3}

Quarterfinals
1	(United States) MJ Fernández (United States) R White	6	5	6
(Japan) E Iida (Japan) M Kidowaki	1	7	4
4	(United States) A Frazier (Japan) R Hiraki	6	6
(Japan) A Hirose (Japan) Y Kamio	1	2
(Japan) N Kijimuta (Japan) M Miyauchi	4	1
3	(Indonesia) Y Basuki (Japan) N Miyagi	6	6
WC	(Japan) M Donoshiro (Japan) Y Tanaka	1	4
(United States) C MacGregor (New Zealand) J Richardson	6	6

Semifinals
1	(United States) MJ Fernández (United States) R White	6	7^{9}
4	(United States) A Frazier (Japan) R Hiraki	3	6^{7}
3	(Indonesia) Y Basuki (Japan) N Miyagi	5	6	6
(United States) C MacGregor (New Zealand) J Richardson	7	4	2

Final
1	(United States) MJ Fernández (United States) R White	6	6
3	(Indonesia) Y Basuki (Japan) N Miyagi	4	4
