= 1993 WTA Tour =

Women's tennis circuit

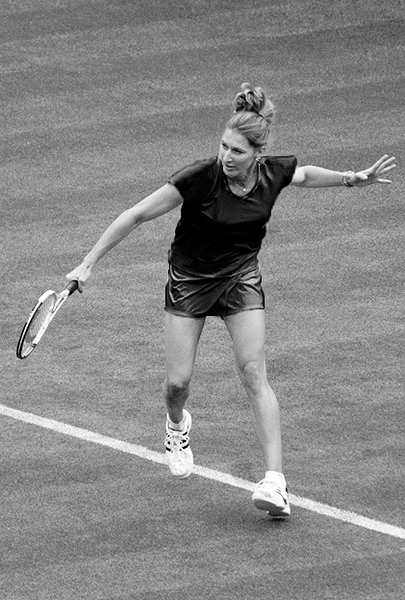
- Steffi Graf finished the year as world No. 1 for the fifth time in her career. She won ten tournaments during the season, including three majors at the French Open, the Wimbledon Championships, and the US Open, as well as the WTA Tour Championships. She also won two Tier I events and finished runner-up at the fourth major, the Australian Open.

Details
- Duration: December 29, 1992 – November 15, 1993
- Edition: 23rd
- Tournaments: 60
- Categories: Grand Slam (4); WTA Championships; WTA Tier I (8); WTA Tier II (19); WTA Tier III (12); WTA Tier IV (16)

Achievements (singles)
- Most titles: (Germany) Steffi Graf (10)
- Most finals: (Germany) Steffi Graf (14)
- Prize money leader: (Germany) Steffi Graf $2,821,337
- Points leader: (Germany) Steffi Graf 409.00

Awards
- Player of the year: (Germany) Steffi Graf
- Doubles team of the year: (United States) Gigi Fernández; (Belarus) Natasha Zvereva
- Most improved player of the year: (Bulgaria) Magdalena Maleeva
- Newcomer of the year: (Croatia) Iva Majoli
- Comeback player of the year: (Australia) Elizabeth Smylie

The 1993 WTA Tour, also known by its sponsored name Kraft General Foods World Tour, was the elite tour for professional women's tennis organised by the Women's Tennis Association (WTA). The WTA Tour included the four Grand Slam tournaments, the WTA Tour Championships and the WTA Tier I, Tier II, Tier III and Tier IV events. ITF tournaments are not part of the WTA Tour, although they award points for the WTA World Ranking.

== Schedule ==
The table below shows the 1993 WTA Tour schedule.

Key

Grand Slam events
Year-end championships
WTA Tier I tournaments
WTA Tier II events
WTA Tier III events
WTA Tier IV events
Team events

=== January ===
Week	Tournament	Champions	Runners-up	Semifinalists	Quarterfinalists
29 Dec	Hyundai Hopman Cup; Perth, Australia; ITF Mixed Teams Championships; Hard (i) – A$1,000,000 – 12 teams	Germany; 2–1	Spain	France; Czech Republic	Ukraine; United States; Switzerland; Australia
4 Jan	Danone Hardcourt Championships; Brisbane, Australia; Tier III event Hard – $150,000 – 56S/32Q/28D; Singles – Doubles	(Spain) Conchita Martínez; 6–3, 6–4	(Bulgaria) Magdalena Maleeva	(Australia) Michelle Jaggard-Lai (Chinese Taipei) Wang Shi-ting	(Mexico) Angélica Gavaldón (France) Noëlle van Lottum (Argentina) Florencia Labat (Australia) Rachel McQuillan
4 Jan	Danone Hardcourt Championships; Brisbane, Australia; Tier III event Hard – $150,000 – 56S/32Q/28D; Singles – Doubles	(Spain) Conchita Martínez (Latvia) Larisa Neiland; 6–2, 6–2	(United States) Shannan McCarthy (United States) Kimberly Po	(Australia) Michelle Jaggard-Lai (Chinese Taipei) Wang Shi-ting	(Mexico) Angélica Gavaldón (France) Noëlle van Lottum (Argentina) Florencia Labat (Australia) Rachel McQuillan
11 Jan	Melbourne Open; Melbourne, Australia; Tier IV event Hard – $100,000 – 32S/32Q/16D; Singles – Doubles	(South Africa) Amanda Coetzer; 6–2, 6–3	(Japan) Naoko Sawamatsu	(Australia) Louise Field (United States) Linda Harvey-Wild	(France) Alexandra Fusai (Latvia) Larisa Neiland (United States) Debbie Graham (Australia) Nicole Provis
11 Jan	Melbourne Open; Melbourne, Australia; Tier IV event Hard – $100,000 – 32S/32Q/16D; Singles – Doubles	(Australia) Nicole Provis (France) Nathalie Tauziat; 6–2, 6–2	(United States) Cammy MacGregor (United States) Shaun Stafford	(Australia) Louise Field (United States) Linda Harvey-Wild	(France) Alexandra Fusai (Latvia) Larisa Neiland (United States) Debbie Graham (Australia) Nicole Provis
11 Jan	Peters NSW Open; Sydney, Australia; Tier II event Hard – $275,000 – 32S/32Q/16D; Singles – Doubles	(United States) Jennifer Capriati; 6–1, 6–4	(Germany) Anke Huber	(Argentina) Gabriela Sabatini (United States) Amy Frazier	(Germany) Barbara Rittner (United States) Pam Shriver (United States) Tami Whitlinger (Spain) Arantxa Sánchez Vicario
11 Jan	Peters NSW Open; Sydney, Australia; Tier II event Hard – $275,000 – 32S/32Q/16D; Singles – Doubles	(United States) Pam Shriver (Australia) Elizabeth Smylie; 7–6^{(7–4)}, 6–2	(United States) Lori McNeil (Australia) Rennae Stubbs	(Argentina) Gabriela Sabatini (United States) Amy Frazier	(Germany) Barbara Rittner (United States) Pam Shriver (United States) Tami Whitlinger (Spain) Arantxa Sánchez Vicario
18 Jan; 25 Jan	Australian Open; Melbourne, Australia; Grand Slam; Hard – $2,400,000 – 128S/64Q/64D/32X; Singles – Doubles – Mixed doubles	(Socialist Federal Republic of Yugoslavia) Monica Seles; 4–6, 6–3, 6–2	(Germany) Steffi Graf	(Argentina) Gabriela Sabatini (Spain) Arantxa Sánchez Vicario	(France) Julie Halard (France) Mary Pierce (United States) Mary Joe Fernández (United States) Jennifer Capriati
18 Jan; 25 Jan	Australian Open; Melbourne, Australia; Grand Slam; Hard – $2,400,000 – 128S/64Q/64D/32X; Singles – Doubles – Mixed doubles	(United States) Gigi Fernández (Belarus) Natasha Zvereva; 6–4, 6–3	(United States) Pam Shriver (Australia) Elizabeth Smylie	(Argentina) Gabriela Sabatini (Spain) Arantxa Sánchez Vicario	(France) Julie Halard (France) Mary Pierce (United States) Mary Joe Fernández (United States) Jennifer Capriati
18 Jan; 25 Jan	Australian Open; Melbourne, Australia; Grand Slam; Hard – $2,400,000 – 128S/64Q/64D/32X; Singles – Doubles – Mixed doubles	(Spain) Arantxa Sánchez Vicario (Australia) Todd Woodbridge; 7–5, 6–4	(United States) Zina Garrison-Jackson (United States) Rick Leach	(Argentina) Gabriela Sabatini (Spain) Arantxa Sánchez Vicario	(France) Julie Halard (France) Mary Pierce (United States) Mary Joe Fernández (United States) Jennifer Capriati

=== February ===
Week	Tournament	Champions	Runners-up	Semifinalists	Quarterfinalists
1 Feb	Amway Classic; Auckland, New Zealand; Tier IV event Hard – $100,000 – 32S/32Q/16D; Singles – Doubles	(South Africa) Elna Reinach; 6–0, 6–0	(United States) Caroline Kuhlman	(Argentina) Inés Gorrochategui (Germany) Karin Kschwendt	(United Kingdom) Clare Wood (United States) Ginger Helgeson (Germany) Angela Kerek (Czech Republic) Andrea Strnadová
1 Feb	Amway Classic; Auckland, New Zealand; Tier IV event Hard – $100,000 – 32S/32Q/16D; Singles – Doubles	(France) Isabelle Demongeot (South Africa) Elna Reinach; 6–2, 6–4	(Canada) Jill Hetherington (United States) Kathy Rinaldi	(Argentina) Inés Gorrochategui (Germany) Karin Kschwendt	(United Kingdom) Clare Wood (United States) Ginger Helgeson (Germany) Angela Kerek (Czech Republic) Andrea Strnadová
1 Feb	Toray Pan Pacific Open; Tokyo, Japan; Tier I event Carpet (i) – $750,000 – 32S/32Q/16D; Singles – Doubles	(United States) Martina Navratilova; 6–2, 6–2	(Latvia) Larisa Neiland	(Germany) Steffi Graf (Czech Republic) Jana Novotná	(Japan) Yone Kamio (France) Nathalie Tauziat (United States) Pam Shriver (Japan) Rika Hiraki
1 Feb	Toray Pan Pacific Open; Tokyo, Japan; Tier I event Carpet (i) – $750,000 – 32S/32Q/16D; Singles – Doubles	(United States) Martina Navratilova (Czech Republic) Helena Suková; 6–4, 6–3	(United States) Lori McNeil (Australia) Rennae Stubbs	(Germany) Steffi Graf (Czech Republic) Jana Novotná	(Japan) Yone Kamio (France) Nathalie Tauziat (United States) Pam Shriver (Japan) Rika Hiraki
8 Feb	Virginia Slims of Chicago; Chicago, United States; Tier II event Carpet (i) – $375,000 – 28S/32Q/16D; Singles – Doubles	(Socialist Federal Republic of Yugoslavia) Monica Seles; 3–6, 6–2, 6–1	(United States) Martina Navratilova	(United States) Mary Joe Fernández (Bulgaria) Katerina Maleeva	(Netherlands) Brenda Schultz (Croatia) Iva Majoli (United States) Pam Shriver (United States) Zina Garrison-Jackson
8 Feb	Virginia Slims of Chicago; Chicago, United States; Tier II event Carpet (i) – $375,000 – 28S/32Q/16D; Singles – Doubles	(United States) Katrina Adams (United States) Zina Garrison-Jackson; 7–6^{(9–7)}, 6–3	(United States) Amy Frazier (United States) Kimberly Po	(United States) Mary Joe Fernández (Bulgaria) Katerina Maleeva	(Netherlands) Brenda Schultz (Croatia) Iva Majoli (United States) Pam Shriver (United States) Zina Garrison-Jackson
8 Feb	World Ladies in Osaka; Osaka, Japan; Tier III event Carpet (i) – $150,000 – 32S/32Q/16D; Singles – Doubles	(Czech Republic) Jana Novotná; 6–3, 6–2	(Japan) Kimiko Date	(France) Pascale Paradis-Mangon (Peru) Laura Gildemeister	(Chinese Taipei) Wang Shi-ting (Japan) Misumi Miyauchi (Bulgaria) Magdalena Maleeva (Australia) Elizabeth Smylie
8 Feb	World Ladies in Osaka; Osaka, Japan; Tier III event Carpet (i) – $150,000 – 32S/32Q/16D; Singles – Doubles	(Latvia) Larisa Neiland (Czech Republic) Jana Novotná; 6–1, 6–3	(Bulgaria) Magdalena Maleeva (Switzerland) Manuela Maleeva-Fragnière	(France) Pascale Paradis-Mangon (Peru) Laura Gildemeister	(Chinese Taipei) Wang Shi-ting (Japan) Misumi Miyauchi (Bulgaria) Magdalena Maleeva (Australia) Elizabeth Smylie
15 Feb	Open Gaz de France; Paris, France; Tier II event Hard (i) – $375,000 – 32S/32Q/16D	(United States) Martina Navratilova; 6–3, 4–6, 7–6^{(7–3)}	(Socialist Federal Republic of Yugoslavia) Monica Seles	(Spain) Conchita Martínez (Czech Republic) Jana Novotná	(France) Mary Pierce (Germany) Karin Kschwendt (France) Nathalie Tauziat (France) Julie Halard
15 Feb	Open Gaz de France; Paris, France; Tier II event Hard (i) – $375,000 – 32S/32Q/16D	(Czech Republic) Jana Novotná (Czech Republic) Andrea Strnadová; 7–6^{(7–2)}, 6–2	(United Kingdom) Jo Durie (France) Catherine Suire	(Spain) Conchita Martínez (Czech Republic) Jana Novotná	(France) Mary Pierce (Germany) Karin Kschwendt (France) Nathalie Tauziat (France) Julie Halard
15 Feb	IGA Tennis Classic; Oklahoma City, United States; Tier III event Hard (i) – $150,000 – 32S/32Q/16D	(United States) Zina Garrison-Jackson; 6–2, 6–2	(United States) Patty Fendick	(Australia) Nicole Provis (United States) Tami Whitlinger	(United States) Linda Harvey-Wild (United States) Meredith McGrath (Mexico) Angélica Gavaldón (Italy) Linda Ferrando
15 Feb	IGA Tennis Classic; Oklahoma City, United States; Tier III event Hard (i) – $150,000 – 32S/32Q/16D	(United States) Patty Fendick (United States) Zina Garrison-Jackson; 6–3, 6–2	(United States) Katrina Adams (Netherlands) Manon Bollegraf	(Australia) Nicole Provis (United States) Tami Whitlinger	(United States) Linda Harvey-Wild (United States) Meredith McGrath (Mexico) Angélica Gavaldón (Italy) Linda Ferrando
22 Feb	Matrix Essential Evert Cup; Indian Wells, United States; Tier II event Hard – $375,000 – 56S/32Q/28D; Singles – Doubles	(United States) Mary Joe Fernández; 3–6, 6–1, 7–6^{(8–6)}	(South Africa) Amanda Coetzer	(Czech Republic) Helena Suková (Netherlands) Stephanie Rottier	(United States) Lindsay Davenport (Bulgaria) Magdalena Maleeva (Australia) Nicole Provis (Netherlands) Miriam Oremans
22 Feb	Matrix Essential Evert Cup; Indian Wells, United States; Tier II event Hard – $375,000 – 56S/32Q/28D; Singles – Doubles	(Australia) Rennae Stubbs (Czech Republic) Helena Suková; 6–3, 6–4	(United States) Ann Grossman (Canada) Patricia Hy	(Czech Republic) Helena Suková (Netherlands) Stephanie Rottier	(United States) Lindsay Davenport (Bulgaria) Magdalena Maleeva (Australia) Nicole Provis (Netherlands) Miriam Oremans
22 Feb	Austrian Indoor Championships; Linz, Austria; Tier III event Carpet (i) – $150,000 – 32S/32Q/16D; Singles – Doubles	(Switzerland) Manuela Maleeva-Fragnière; 6–2, 1-0 RET	(Spain) Conchita Martínez	(Georgia (country)) Leila Meskhi (Austria) Judith Wiesner	(Germany) Wiltrud Probst (Italy) Natalia Baudone (Netherlands) Kristie Boogert (France) Pascale Paradis-Mangon
22 Feb	Austrian Indoor Championships; Linz, Austria; Tier III event Carpet (i) – $150,000 – 32S/32Q/16D; Singles – Doubles	(Russia) Eugenia Maniokova (Georgia (country)) Leila Meskhi; W/O	(Spain) Conchita Martínez (Austria) Judith Wiesner	(Georgia (country)) Leila Meskhi (Austria) Judith Wiesner	(Germany) Wiltrud Probst (Italy) Natalia Baudone (Netherlands) Kristie Boogert (France) Pascale Paradis-Mangon

=== March ===
Week	Tournament	Champions	Runners-up	Semifinalists	Quarterfinalists
1 Mar	Virginia Slims of Florida; Delray Beach, United States; Tier II event Hard – $375,000 – 56S/32Q/28D; Singles – Doubles	(Germany) Steffi Graf; 6–4, 6–3	(Spain) Arantxa Sánchez Vicario	(Germany) Anke Huber (South Africa) Amanda Coetzer	(United States) Zina Garrison-Jackson (United States) Mary Joe Fernández (United States) Lindsay Davenport (Germany) Barbara Rittner
1 Mar	Virginia Slims of Florida; Delray Beach, United States; Tier II event Hard – $375,000 – 56S/32Q/28D; Singles – Doubles	(United States) Gigi Fernández (Belarus) Natasha Zvereva; 6–2, 6–2	(Latvia) Larisa Neiland (Czech Republic) Jana Novotná	(Germany) Anke Huber (South Africa) Amanda Coetzer	(United States) Zina Garrison-Jackson (United States) Mary Joe Fernández (United States) Lindsay Davenport (Germany) Barbara Rittner
8 Mar	Lipton Championships; Key Biscayne, United States; Tier I event Hard – $900,000 – 96S/64Q/48D; Singles – Doubles	(Spain) Arantxa Sánchez Vicario; 6–4, 3–6, 6–3	(Germany) Steffi Graf	(Argentina) Gabriela Sabatini (Japan) Kimiko Date	(France) Nathalie Tauziat (Czech Republic) Jana Novotná (United States) Mary Joe Fernández (Georgia (country)) Leila Meskhi
8 Mar	Lipton Championships; Key Biscayne, United States; Tier I event Hard – $900,000 – 96S/64Q/48D; Singles – Doubles	(Latvia) Larisa Neiland (Czech Republic) Jana Novotná; 6–2, 7–5	(Canada) Jill Hetherington (United States) Kathy Rinaldi	(Argentina) Gabriela Sabatini (Japan) Kimiko Date	(France) Nathalie Tauziat (Czech Republic) Jana Novotná (United States) Mary Joe Fernández (Georgia (country)) Leila Meskhi
22 Mar	Virginia Slims of Houston; Houston, United States; Tier II event Clay – $375,000 – 28S/32Q/16D; Singles – Doubles	(Spain) Conchita Martínez; 6–3, 6–2	(Germany) Sabine Hack	(Argentina) Gabriela Sabatini (Czech Republic) Jana Novotná	(Italy) Sandra Cecchini (Argentina) Patricia Tarabini (Slovakia) Radka Zrubáková (Belarus) Tatiana Ignatieva
22 Mar	Virginia Slims of Houston; Houston, United States; Tier II event Clay – $375,000 – 28S/32Q/16D; Singles – Doubles	(United States) Katrina Adams (Netherlands) Manon Bollegraf; 6–3, 5–7, 7–6^{(9–7)}	(Russia) Eugenia Maniokova (Slovakia) Radka Zrubáková	(Argentina) Gabriela Sabatini (Czech Republic) Jana Novotná	(Italy) Sandra Cecchini (Argentina) Patricia Tarabini (Slovakia) Radka Zrubáková (Belarus) Tatiana Ignatieva
22 Mar	Light 'n' Lively Doubles Championships; Wesley Chapel, United States; Clay – $175,000 – 8D; Doubles	(United States) Gigi Fernández (Belarus) Natasha Zvereva; 7–5, 6–3	(Latvia) Larisa Neiland (Spain) Arantxa Sánchez Vicario	(United States) McNeil / (Australia) Stubbs (United States) Shriver / (Australia) Smylie	(United States) Austin / (South Africa) Reinach (South Africa) Fairbank / (United States) Fendick (Canada) Hetherington / (United States) Rinaldi (United States) Collins / (United States) Rehe
29 Mar	Family Circle Magazine Cup; Hilton Head Island, United States; Tier I event $750,000 – clay (green) – 56S/28Q/32D; Singles – Doubles	(Germany) Steffi Graf; 7–6^{(10–8)}, 6–1	(Spain) Arantxa Sánchez Vicario	(Argentina) Gabriela Sabatini (United States) Jennifer Capriati	(United States) Chanda Rubin (Bulgaria) Katerina Maleeva (South Africa) Amanda Coetzer (Germany) Sabine Hack
29 Mar	Family Circle Magazine Cup; Hilton Head Island, United States; Tier I event $750,000 – clay (green) – 56S/28Q/32D; Singles – Doubles	(United States) Gigi Fernández (Belarus) Natasha Zvereva; 6–3, 6–1	(United States) Katrina Adams (Netherlands) Manon Bollegraf	(Argentina) Gabriela Sabatini (United States) Jennifer Capriati	(United States) Chanda Rubin (Bulgaria) Katerina Maleeva (South Africa) Amanda Coetzer (Germany) Sabine Hack

=== April ===
Week	Tournament	Champions	Runners-up	Semifinalists	Quarterfinalists
5 Apr	Bausch & Lomb Championships; Amelia Island, United States; Tier II event $375,000 – clay (green) – 56S/32Q/28D; Singles – Doubles	(Spain) Arantxa Sánchez Vicario; 6–2, 5–7, 6–2	(Argentina) Gabriela Sabatini	(Switzerland) Manuela Maleeva-Fragnière (South Africa) Amanda Coetzer	(United States) Shaun Stafford (Belarus) Natasha Zvereva (United States) Jennifer Capriati (Georgia (country)) Leila Meskhi
5 Apr	Bausch & Lomb Championships; Amelia Island, United States; Tier II event $375,000 – clay (green) – 56S/32Q/28D; Singles – Doubles	(Switzerland) Manuela Maleeva-Fragnière (Georgia (country)) Leila Meskhi; 3–6, 6–3, 6–4	(South Africa) Amanda Coetzer (Argentina) Inés Gorrochategui	(Switzerland) Manuela Maleeva-Fragnière (South Africa) Amanda Coetzer	(United States) Shaun Stafford (Belarus) Natasha Zvereva (United States) Jennifer Capriati (Georgia (country)) Leila Meskhi
5 Apr	Japan Open; Tokyo, Japan; Tier III event Hard – $150,000 – 30S/32Q/16D; Singles – Doubles	(Japan) Kimiko Date; 6–1, 6–3	(Netherlands) Stephanie Rottier	(Australia) Nicole Provis (Japan) Mana Endo	(Netherlands) Miriam Oremans (United States) Pam Shriver (Australia) Michelle Jaggard-Lai (United States) Patty Fendick
5 Apr	Japan Open; Tokyo, Japan; Tier III event Hard – $150,000 – 30S/32Q/16D; Singles – Doubles	(Japan) Ei Iida (Japan) Maya Kidowaki; 6–2, 4–6, 6–4	(China) Fang Li (Japan) Kyōko Nagatsuka	(Australia) Nicole Provis (Japan) Mana Endo	(Netherlands) Miriam Oremans (United States) Pam Shriver (Australia) Michelle Jaggard-Lai (United States) Patty Fendick
12 Apr	Volvo Women's Open; Pattaya City, Thailand; Tier IV event Hard – $100,000 – 32S/32Q/16D; Singles – Doubles	(Indonesia) Yayuk Basuki; 6–3, 6–1	(United States) Marianne Werdel	(United States) Patty Fendick (Netherlands) Stephanie Rottier	(Canada) Helen Kelesi (Germany) Wiltrud Probst (United States) Nicole Arendt (France) Sandrine Testud
12 Apr	Volvo Women's Open; Pattaya City, Thailand; Tier IV event Hard – $100,000 – 32S/32Q/16D; Singles – Doubles	(United States) Cammy MacGregor (France) Catherine Suire; 6–3, 7–6^{(7–3)}	(United States) Patty Fendick (United States) Meredith McGrath	(United States) Patty Fendick (Netherlands) Stephanie Rottier	(Canada) Helen Kelesi (Germany) Wiltrud Probst (United States) Nicole Arendt (France) Sandrine Testud
19 Apr	Women's Open Malaysia; Kuala Lumpur, Malaysia; Tier IV event Hard – $100,000 – 30S/32Q/16D	(Australia) Nicole Provis; 6–3, 6–2	(United States) Ann Grossman	(United States) Patty Fendick (Netherlands) Stephanie Rottier	(France) Pascale Paradis-Mangon (Indonesia) Romana Tedjakusuma (Indonesia) Yayuk Basuki (Canada) Helen Kelesi
19 Apr	Women's Open Malaysia; Kuala Lumpur, Malaysia; Tier IV event Hard – $100,000 – 30S/32Q/16D	(United States) Patty Fendick (United States) Meredith McGrath; 6–4, 7–6^{(7–2)}	(United States) Nicole Arendt (Australia) Kristine Radford	(United States) Patty Fendick (Netherlands) Stephanie Rottier	(France) Pascale Paradis-Mangon (Indonesia) Romana Tedjakusuma (Indonesia) Yayuk Basuki (Canada) Helen Kelesi
19 Apr	International Championships of Spain; Barcelona, Spain; Tier II event Clay – $375,000 – 32S/32Q/16D	(Spain) Arantxa Sánchez Vicario; 6–1, 6–4	(Spain) Conchita Martínez	(South Africa) Amanda Coetzer (Germany) Sabine Hack	(France) Mary Pierce (Bulgaria) Magdalena Maleeva (Italy) Federica Bonsignori (Italy) Laura Golarsa
19 Apr	International Championships of Spain; Barcelona, Spain; Tier II event Clay – $375,000 – 32S/32Q/16D	(Spain) Conchita Martínez (Spain) Arantxa Sánchez Vicario; 4–6, 6–1, 6–0	(Bulgaria) Magdalena Maleeva (Switzerland) Manuela Maleeva-Fragnière	(South Africa) Amanda Coetzer (Germany) Sabine Hack	(France) Mary Pierce (Bulgaria) Magdalena Maleeva (Italy) Federica Bonsignori (Italy) Laura Golarsa
26 Apr	Indonesian Women's Open; Jakarta, Indonesia; Tier IV event Hard – $100,000 – 30S/32Q/16D; Singles – Doubles	(Indonesia) Yayuk Basuki; 6–4, 6–4	(United States) Ann Grossman	(United States) Nicole Arendt (Australia) Michelle Jaggard-Lai	(Netherlands) Kristie Boogert (Netherlands) Linda Niemantsverdriet (Australia) Kristin Godridge (Slovakia) Katarína Studeníková
26 Apr	Indonesian Women's Open; Jakarta, Indonesia; Tier IV event Hard – $100,000 – 30S/32Q/16D; Singles – Doubles	(United States) Nicole Arendt (Australia) Kristine Radford; 6–3, 6–4	(United States) Amy deLone (United States) Erika deLone	(United States) Nicole Arendt (Australia) Michelle Jaggard-Lai	(Netherlands) Kristie Boogert (Netherlands) Linda Niemantsverdriet (Australia) Kristin Godridge (Slovakia) Katarína Studeníková
26 Apr	Citizen Cup; Hamburg, Germany; Tier II event Clay – $375,000 – 32S/32Q/16D; Singles – Doubles	(Spain) Arantxa Sánchez Vicario; 6–3, 6–3	(Germany) Steffi Graf	(Bulgaria) Magdalena Maleeva (Czech Republic) Jana Novotná	(Socialist Federal Republic of Yugoslavia) Monica Seles (Switzerland) Manuela Maleeva-Fragnière (Germany) Anke Huber (Bulgaria) Katerina Maleeva
26 Apr	Citizen Cup; Hamburg, Germany; Tier II event Clay – $375,000 – 32S/32Q/16D; Singles – Doubles	(Germany) Steffi Graf (Australia) Rennae Stubbs; 6–4, 7–6^{(7–5)}	(Latvia) Larisa Neiland (Czech Republic) Jana Novotná	(Bulgaria) Magdalena Maleeva (Czech Republic) Jana Novotná	(Socialist Federal Republic of Yugoslavia) Monica Seles (Switzerland) Manuela Maleeva-Fragnière (Germany) Anke Huber (Bulgaria) Katerina Maleeva
26 Apr	Ilva Trophy; Taranto, Italy; Tier IV event Clay – $100,000 – 32S/32Q/16D; Singles – Doubles	(Netherlands) Brenda Schultz; 7–6^{(7–5)}, 6–2	(United States) Debbie Graham	(Italy) Linda Ferrando (France) Alexandra Fusai	(Italy) Francesca Romano (Italy) Silvia Farina (Croatia) Nadine Ercegović (Italy) Sandra Cecchini
26 Apr	Ilva Trophy; Taranto, Italy; Tier IV event Clay – $100,000 – 32S/32Q/16D; Singles – Doubles	(United States) Debbie Graham (Netherlands) Brenda Schultz; 6–0, 6–4	(Czech Republic) Petra Langrová (Argentina) Mercedes Paz	(Italy) Linda Ferrando (France) Alexandra Fusai	(Italy) Francesca Romano (Italy) Silvia Farina (Croatia) Nadine Ercegović (Italy) Sandra Cecchini

=== May ===
Week	Tournament	Champions	Runners-up	Semifinalists	Quarterfinalists
3 May	Campionati Internazionali d'Italia; Rome, Italy; Tier I event Clay – $750,000 – 56S/32Q/28D; Singles – Doubles	(Spain) Conchita Martínez; 7–5, 6–1	(Argentina) Gabriela Sabatini	(Spain) Arantxa Sánchez Vicario (United States) Mary Joe Fernández	(United States) Jennifer Capriati (Italy) Maria-Francesca Bentivoglio (Germany) Anke Huber (United States) Martina Navratilova
3 May	Campionati Internazionali d'Italia; Rome, Italy; Tier I event Clay – $750,000 – 56S/32Q/28D; Singles – Doubles	(Czech Republic) Jana Novotná (Spain) Arantxa Sánchez Vicario; 6–4, 6–2	(United States) Mary Joe Fernández (United States) Zina Garrison-Jackson	(Spain) Arantxa Sánchez Vicario (United States) Mary Joe Fernández	(United States) Jennifer Capriati (Italy) Maria-Francesca Bentivoglio (Germany) Anke Huber (United States) Martina Navratilova
3 May	Belgian Ladies Open; Liège, Belgium; Tier IV event Clay – $100,000 – 32S/32Q/16D; Singles – Doubles	(Czech Republic) Radka Bobková; 6–3, 4–6, 6–2	(Germany) Karin Kschwendt	(France) Catherine Mothes-Jobkel (France) Alexandra Fusai	(Poland) Katarzyna Nowak (Sweden) Cecilia Dahlman (Ukraine) Elena Brioukhovets (Spain) Virginia Ruano Pascual
3 May	Belgian Ladies Open; Liège, Belgium; Tier IV event Clay – $100,000 – 32S/32Q/16D; Singles – Doubles	(Czech Republic) Radka Bobková (Argentina) María José Gaidano; 6–4, 2–6, 7–6^{(7–4)}	(Belgium) Ann Devries (Belgium) Dominique Monami	(France) Catherine Mothes-Jobkel (France) Alexandra Fusai	(Poland) Katarzyna Nowak (Sweden) Cecilia Dahlman (Ukraine) Elena Brioukhovets (Spain) Virginia Ruano Pascual
10 May	German Open; Berlin, Germany; Tier I event Clay – $750,000 – 32S/32Q/16D; Singles – Doubles	(Germany) Steffi Graf; 7–6^{(7–3)}, 2–6, 6–4	(Argentina) Gabriela Sabatini	(United States) Mary Joe Fernández (Spain) Conchita Martínez	(Bulgaria) Magdalena Maleeva (France) Nathalie Tauziat (Netherlands) Brenda Schultz (Germany) Anke Huber
10 May	German Open; Berlin, Germany; Tier I event Clay – $750,000 – 32S/32Q/16D; Singles – Doubles	(United States) Gigi Fernández (Belarus) Natasha Zvereva; 6–1, 6–3	(United States) Debbie Graham (Netherlands) Brenda Schultz	(United States) Mary Joe Fernández (Spain) Conchita Martínez	(Bulgaria) Magdalena Maleeva (France) Nathalie Tauziat (Netherlands) Brenda Schultz (Germany) Anke Huber
17 May	European Open-Lucerne; Lucerne, Switzerland; Tier III event Clay – $150,000 – 32S/16D; Singles – Doubles	(United States) Lindsay Davenport; 6–1, 4–6, 6–2	(Australia) Nicole Provis	(Italy) Linda Ferrando (Germany) Sabine Hack	(Switzerland) Manuela Maleeva-Fragnière (Germany) Claudia Porwik (United States) Caroline Kuhlman (Czech Republic) Helena Suková
17 May	European Open-Lucerne; Lucerne, Switzerland; Tier III event Clay – $150,000 – 32S/16D; Singles – Doubles	(United States) Mary Joe Fernández (Czech Republic) Helena Suková; 6–2, 6–4	(United States) Lindsay Davenport (United States) Marianne Werdel	(Italy) Linda Ferrando (Germany) Sabine Hack	(Switzerland) Manuela Maleeva-Fragnière (Germany) Claudia Porwik (United States) Caroline Kuhlman (Czech Republic) Helena Suková
17 May	Internationaux de Strasbourg; Strasbourg, France; Tier III event Clay – $150,000 – 32S/32Q/16D; Singles – Doubles	(Japan) Naoko Sawamatsu; 4–6, 6–1, 6–3	(Austria) Judith Wiesner	(Czech Republic) Jana Novotná (France) Sandrine Testud	(Argentina) Florencia Labat (United States) Ginger Helgeson (Japan) Mana Endo (France) Pascale Paradis-Mangon
17 May	Internationaux de Strasbourg; Strasbourg, France; Tier III event Clay – $150,000 – 32S/32Q/16D; Singles – Doubles	(United States) Shaun Stafford (Hungary) Andrea Temesvári; 6–7^{(5–7)}, 6–3, 6–4	(Canada) Jill Hetherington (United States) Kathy Rinaldi	(Czech Republic) Jana Novotná (France) Sandrine Testud	(Argentina) Florencia Labat (United States) Ginger Helgeson (Japan) Mana Endo (France) Pascale Paradis-Mangon
24 May; 31 May	French Open; Paris, France; Grand Slam; Clay – $3,456,143 – 128S/64Q/64D/48X; Singles – Doubles – Mixed doubles	(Germany) Steffi Graf; 4–6, 6–2, 6–4	(United States) Mary Joe Fernández	(Germany) Anke Huber (Spain) Arantxa Sánchez Vicario	(United States) Jennifer Capriati (Spain) Conchita Martínez (Argentina) Gabriela Sabatini (Czech Republic) Jana Novotná
24 May; 31 May	French Open; Paris, France; Grand Slam; Clay – $3,456,143 – 128S/64Q/64D/48X; Singles – Doubles – Mixed doubles	(United States) Gigi Fernández (Belarus) Natasha Zvereva; 6–3, 7–5	(Latvia) Larisa Neiland (Czech Republic) Jana Novotná	(Germany) Anke Huber (Spain) Arantxa Sánchez Vicario	(United States) Jennifer Capriati (Spain) Conchita Martínez (Argentina) Gabriela Sabatini (Czech Republic) Jana Novotná
24 May; 31 May	French Open; Paris, France; Grand Slam; Clay – $3,456,143 – 128S/64Q/64D/48X; Singles – Doubles – Mixed doubles	(Russia) Eugenia Maniokova (Russia) Andrei Olhovskiy; 6–2, 4–6, 6–4	(South Africa) Elna Reinach (South Africa) Danie Visser	(Germany) Anke Huber (Spain) Arantxa Sánchez Vicario	(United States) Jennifer Capriati (Spain) Conchita Martínez (Argentina) Gabriela Sabatini (Czech Republic) Jana Novotná

=== June ===
Week	Tournament	Champions	Runners-up	Semifinalists	Quarterfinalists
7 Jun	DFS Classic; Birmingham, Great Britain; Tier III event $150,000 – grass- 56S/32Q/28D; Singles – Doubles	(United States) Lori McNeil; 6–4, 2–6, 6–3	(United States) Zina Garrison-Jackson	(Latvia) Larisa Neiland (United States) Chanda Rubin	(Australia) Kristine Radford (France) Nathalie Tauziat (United States) Pam Shriver (Italy) Laura Golarsa
7 Jun	DFS Classic; Birmingham, Great Britain; Tier III event $150,000 – grass- 56S/32Q/28D; Singles – Doubles	(United States) Lori McNeil (United States) Martina Navratilova; 6–3, 6–4	(United States) Pam Shriver (Australia) Elizabeth Smylie	(Latvia) Larisa Neiland (United States) Chanda Rubin	(Australia) Kristine Radford (France) Nathalie Tauziat (United States) Pam Shriver (Italy) Laura Golarsa
14 Jun	Volkswagen Cup; Eastbourne, Great Britain; Tier II event Grass – $375,000 – 64S/32Q/16D; Singles – Doubles	(United States) Martina Navratilova; 2–6, 6–2, 6–3	(Netherlands) Miriam Oremans	(United States) Patty Fendick (United States) Lori McNeil	(United States) Gigi Fernández (United States) Ginger Helgeson (Czech Republic) Helena Suková (France) Nathalie Tauziat
14 Jun	Volkswagen Cup; Eastbourne, Great Britain; Tier II event Grass – $375,000 – 64S/32Q/16D; Singles – Doubles	(United States) Gigi Fernández (Belarus) Natasha Zvereva; 2–6, 7–5, 6–1	(Latvia) Larisa Neiland (Czech Republic) Jana Novotná	(United States) Patty Fendick (United States) Lori McNeil	(United States) Gigi Fernández (United States) Ginger Helgeson (Czech Republic) Helena Suková (France) Nathalie Tauziat
21 Jun; 28 Jun	Wimbledon Championships; London, Great Britain; Grand Slam; Grass – $3,312,302 – 128S/64Q/64D/64X; Singles – Doubles – Mixed doubles	(Germany) Steffi Graf; 7–6^{(8–6)}, 1–6, 6–4	(Czech Republic) Jana Novotná	(Spain) Conchita Martínez (United States) Martina Navratilova	(United States) Jennifer Capriati (Czech Republic) Helena Suková (Argentina) Gabriela Sabatini (Belarus) Natasha Zvereva
21 Jun; 28 Jun	Wimbledon Championships; London, Great Britain; Grand Slam; Grass – $3,312,302 – 128S/64Q/64D/64X; Singles – Doubles – Mixed doubles	(United States) Gigi Fernández (Belarus) Natasha Zvereva; 6–4, 6–7^{(4–7)}, 6–4	(Latvia) Larisa Neiland (Czech Republic) Jana Novotná	(Spain) Conchita Martínez (United States) Martina Navratilova	(United States) Jennifer Capriati (Czech Republic) Helena Suková (Argentina) Gabriela Sabatini (Belarus) Natasha Zvereva
21 Jun; 28 Jun	Wimbledon Championships; London, Great Britain; Grand Slam; Grass – $3,312,302 – 128S/64Q/64D/64X; Singles – Doubles – Mixed doubles	(United States) Martina Navratilova (Australia) Mark Woodforde; 6–3, 6–4	(Netherlands) Manon Bollegraf (Netherlands) Tom Nijssen	(Spain) Conchita Martínez (United States) Martina Navratilova	(United States) Jennifer Capriati (Czech Republic) Helena Suková (Argentina) Gabriela Sabatini (Belarus) Natasha Zvereva

=== July ===
Week	Tournament	Champions	Runners-up	Semifinalists	Quarterfinalists
5 Jul	Internazionale Femminile di Palermo; Palermo, Italy; Tier IV event Clay – $100,000 – 32S/32Q/16D; Singles – Doubles	(Czech Republic) Radka Bobková; 6–3, 6–2	(France) Mary Pierce	(Italy) Sandra Cecchini (Argentina) Patricia Tarabini	(Belgium) Dominique Monami (Italy) Marzia Grossi (Romania) Irina Spîrlea (Switzerland) Emanuela Zardo
5 Jul	Internazionale Femminile di Palermo; Palermo, Italy; Tier IV event Clay – $100,000 – 32S/32Q/16D; Singles – Doubles	(Germany) Karin Kschwendt (Ukraine) Natalia Medvedeva; 6–4, 7–6^{(7–4)}	(Italy) Silvia Farina (Netherlands) Brenda Schultz	(Italy) Sandra Cecchini (Argentina) Patricia Tarabini	(Belgium) Dominique Monami (Italy) Marzia Grossi (Romania) Irina Spîrlea (Switzerland) Emanuela Zardo
12 Jul	Citroën Cup; Kitzbühel, Austria; Tier III event Clay – $150,000 – 32S/32Q/16D; Singles – Doubles	(Germany) Anke Huber; 6–4, 6–1	(Austria) Judith Wiesner	(Germany) Sabine Hack (Switzerland) Emanuela Zardo	(Spain) Virginia Ruano Pascual (Argentina) Florencia Labat (Austria) Barbara Schett (France) Mary Pierce
12 Jul	Citroën Cup; Kitzbühel, Austria; Tier III event Clay – $150,000 – 32S/32Q/16D; Singles – Doubles	(China) Fang Li (Belgium) Dominique Monami; 6–2, 6–1	(Croatia) Maja Murić (Czech Republic) Pavlína Rajzlová	(Germany) Sabine Hack (Switzerland) Emanuela Zardo	(Spain) Virginia Ruano Pascual (Argentina) Florencia Labat (Austria) Barbara Schett (France) Mary Pierce
12 Jul	BVV Prague Open; Prague, Czech Republic; Tier IV event Hard – $100,000 – 32S/32Q/16D; Singles – Doubles	(Ukraine) Natalia Medvedeva; 6–3, 6–2	(Germany) Meike Babel	(Netherlands) Nicole Krijger-Jagerman (Argentina) Patricia Tarabini	(Argentina) Inés Gorrochategui (Czech Republic) Andrea Strnadová (Canada) Helen Kelesi (Italy) Linda Ferrando
12 Jul	BVV Prague Open; Prague, Czech Republic; Tier IV event Hard – $100,000 – 32S/32Q/16D; Singles – Doubles	(Argentina) Inés Gorrochategui (Argentina) Patricia Tarabini; 6–2, 6–1	(Italy) Laura Golarsa (Netherlands) Caroline Vis	(Netherlands) Nicole Krijger-Jagerman (Argentina) Patricia Tarabini	(Argentina) Inés Gorrochategui (Czech Republic) Andrea Strnadová (Canada) Helen Kelesi (Italy) Linda Ferrando
19 Jul	Fed Cup; Frankfurt, Germany; Team event Clay	Spain; 3-0	Australia	France; Argentina	Finland; United States; Czech Republic; Netherlands
26 July	Puerto Rico Open; San Juan, Puerto Rico; Tier IV event Hard – $150,000 – 32S/32Q/16D; Singles – Doubles	(United States) Linda Harvey-Wild; 6–3, 5–7, 6–3	(United States) Ann Grossman	(Mexico) Angélica Gavaldón (United States) Debbie Graham	(Paraguay) Rossana de los Ríos (Italy) Laura Golarsa (United States) Audra Keller (Romania) Cătălina Cristea
26 July	Puerto Rico Open; San Juan, Puerto Rico; Tier IV event Hard – $150,000 – 32S/32Q/16D; Singles – Doubles	(United States) Debbie Graham (United States) Ann Grossman; 5–7, 7–5, 7–5	(United States) Gigi Fernández (Australia) Rennae Stubbs	(Mexico) Angélica Gavaldón (United States) Debbie Graham	(Paraguay) Rossana de los Ríos (Italy) Laura Golarsa (United States) Audra Keller (Romania) Cătălina Cristea
26 July	San Marino Open; City of San Marino, San Marino; Tier IV event Clay – $100,000 – 32S/32Q/16D; Singles – Doubles	(Italy) Marzia Grossi; 3–6, 7–5, 6–1	(Germany) Barbara Rittner	(South Africa) Joannette Kruger (Germany) Meike Babel	(Italy) Maria-Francesca Bentivoglio (Belgium) Sandra Wasserman (Argentina) Florencia Labat (Italy) Sandra Cecchini
26 July	San Marino Open; City of San Marino, San Marino; Tier IV event Clay – $100,000 – 32S/32Q/16D; Singles – Doubles	(Italy) Sandra Cecchini (Argentina) Patricia Tarabini; 6–3, 6–2	(Argentina) Florencia Labat (Germany) Barbara Rittner	(South Africa) Joannette Kruger (Germany) Meike Babel	(Italy) Maria-Francesca Bentivoglio (Belgium) Sandra Wasserman (Argentina) Florencia Labat (Italy) Sandra Cecchini
26 July	Acura US Hardcourts; Stratton Mountain, United States; Tier II event Hard – $375,000 – 30S/32Q/16D; Singles – Doubles	(Spain) Conchita Martínez; 6–3, 6–2	(United States) Zina Garrison-Jackson	(Switzerland) Manuela Maleeva-Fragnière (Austria) Beate Reinstadler	(United States) Jolene Watanabe (United States) Tami Whitlinger (Czech Republic) Helena Suková (Germany) Claudia Porwik
26 July	Acura US Hardcourts; Stratton Mountain, United States; Tier II event Hard – $375,000 – 30S/32Q/16D; Singles – Doubles	(Australia) Elizabeth Smylie (Czech Republic) Helena Suková; 6–1, 6–2	(Switzerland) Manuela Maleeva-Fragnière (Argentina) Mercedes Paz	(Switzerland) Manuela Maleeva-Fragnière (Austria) Beate Reinstadler	(United States) Jolene Watanabe (United States) Tami Whitlinger (Czech Republic) Helena Suková (Germany) Claudia Porwik

=== August ===
Week	Tournament	Champions	Runners-up	Semifinalists	Quarterfinalists
2 Aug	Mazda Tennis Classic; San Diego, United States; Tier II event Hard – $375,000 – 56S/32Q/28D; Singles – Doubles	(Germany) Steffi Graf; 6–4, 4–6, 6–1	(Spain) Arantxa Sánchez Vicario	(Spain) Conchita Martínez (Germany) Marketa Kochta	(France) Mary Pierce (Bulgaria) Magdalena Maleeva (Kazakhstan) Elena Likhovtseva (United States) Ann Grossman
2 Aug	Mazda Tennis Classic; San Diego, United States; Tier II event Hard – $375,000 – 56S/32Q/28D; Singles – Doubles	(United States) Gigi Fernández (Czech Republic) Helena Suková; 6–4, 6–3	(United States) Pam Shriver (Australia) Elizabeth Smylie	(Spain) Conchita Martínez (Germany) Marketa Kochta	(France) Mary Pierce (Bulgaria) Magdalena Maleeva (Kazakhstan) Elena Likhovtseva (United States) Ann Grossman
9 Aug	Virginia Slims of Los Angeles; Manhattan Beach, United States; Tier II event Hard – $375,000 – 56S/32Q/28D; Singles – Doubles	(United States) Martina Navratilova; 7–5, 7–6^{(7–4)}	(Spain) Arantxa Sánchez Vicario	(United States) Lori McNeil (Argentina) Gabriela Sabatini	(United States) Zina Garrison-Jackson (Bulgaria) Magdalena Maleeva (United States) Kimberly Po (South Africa) Amanda Coetzer
9 Aug	Virginia Slims of Los Angeles; Manhattan Beach, United States; Tier II event Hard – $375,000 – 56S/32Q/28D; Singles – Doubles	(Spain) Arantxa Sánchez Vicario (Czech Republic) Helena Suková; 7–6^{(7–3)}, 6–3	(United States) Gigi Fernández (Belarus) Natasha Zvereva	(United States) Lori McNeil (Argentina) Gabriela Sabatini	(United States) Zina Garrison-Jackson (Bulgaria) Magdalena Maleeva (United States) Kimberly Po (South Africa) Amanda Coetzer
16 Aug	Matidee LTD, International; Toronto, Canada; Tier I event Hard – $750,000 – 56S/32Q/28D; Singles – Doubles	(Germany) Steffi Graf; 6–1, 0–6, 6–3	(United States) Jennifer Capriati	(Switzerland) Manuela Maleeva-Fragnière (Spain) Arantxa Sánchez Vicario	(France) Nathalie Tauziat (United States) Mary Joe Fernández (France) Julie Halard (Germany) Anke Huber
16 Aug	Matidee LTD, International; Toronto, Canada; Tier I event Hard – $750,000 – 56S/32Q/28D; Singles – Doubles	(Latvia) Larisa Neiland (Czech Republic) Jana Novotná; 6–1, 6–2	(Spain) Arantxa Sánchez Vicario (Czech Republic) Helena Suková	(Switzerland) Manuela Maleeva-Fragnière (Spain) Arantxa Sánchez Vicario	(France) Nathalie Tauziat (United States) Mary Joe Fernández (France) Julie Halard (Germany) Anke Huber
23 Aug	OTB International Tennis Open; Schenectady, United States; Tier III event Hard – $150,000 – 32S/32Q/16D; Singles – Doubles	(Latvia) Larisa Neiland; 6–3, 7–5	(Ukraine) Natalia Medvedeva	(France) Nathalie Tauziat (Germany) Meike Babel	(United States) Ginger Helgeson (Austria) Judith Wiesner (Georgia (country)) Leila Meskhi (Sweden) Åsa Carlsson
23 Aug	OTB International Tennis Open; Schenectady, United States; Tier III event Hard – $150,000 – 32S/32Q/16D; Singles – Doubles	(Australia) Rachel McQuillan (Germany) Claudia Porwik; 4–6, 6–4, 6–2	(Argentina) Florencia Labat (Germany) Barbara Rittner	(France) Nathalie Tauziat (Germany) Meike Babel	(United States) Ginger Helgeson (Austria) Judith Wiesner (Georgia (country)) Leila Meskhi (Sweden) Åsa Carlsson
30 Aug; 6 Sep	US Open; New York City, United States; Grand Slam; Hard – $3,967,250 – 128S/64Q/64D/32X; Singles – Doubles – Mixed doubles	(Germany) Steffi Graf; 6–3, 6–3	(Czech Republic) Helena Suková	(Switzerland) Manuela Maleeva-Fragnière (Spain) Arantxa Sánchez Vicario	(Argentina) Gabriela Sabatini (Japan) Kimiko Date (Bulgaria) Katerina Maleeva (Belarus) Natasha Zvereva
30 Aug; 6 Sep	US Open; New York City, United States; Grand Slam; Hard – $3,967,250 – 128S/64Q/64D/32X; Singles – Doubles – Mixed doubles	(Spain) Arantxa Sánchez Vicario (Czech Republic) Helena Suková; 6–4, 6–2	(South Africa) Amanda Coetzer (Argentina) Inés Gorrochategui	(Switzerland) Manuela Maleeva-Fragnière (Spain) Arantxa Sánchez Vicario	(Argentina) Gabriela Sabatini (Japan) Kimiko Date (Bulgaria) Katerina Maleeva (Belarus) Natasha Zvereva
30 Aug; 6 Sep	US Open; New York City, United States; Grand Slam; Hard – $3,967,250 – 128S/64Q/64D/32X; Singles – Doubles – Mixed doubles	(Czech Republic) Helena Suková (Australia) Todd Woodbridge; 6–3, 7–6^{(8–6)}	(United States) Martina Navratilova (Australia) Mark Woodforde	(Switzerland) Manuela Maleeva-Fragnière (Spain) Arantxa Sánchez Vicario	(Argentina) Gabriela Sabatini (Japan) Kimiko Date (Bulgaria) Katerina Maleeva (Belarus) Natasha Zvereva

=== September ===
Week	Tournament	Champions	Runners-up	Semifinalists	Quarterfinalists
13 Sep	Digital Open; Hong Kong; Tier IV event Hard – $100,000 – 32S/24Q/16D; Singles – Doubles	(Chinese Taipei) Wang Shi-ting; 6–4, 3–6, 7–5	(United States) Marianne Werdel	(Canada) Patricia Hy (United States) Caroline Kuhlman	(United States) Erika deLone (Australia) Michelle Jaggard-Lai (United States) Debbie Graham (Australia) Kristine Radford
13 Sep	Digital Open; Hong Kong; Tier IV event Hard – $100,000 – 32S/24Q/16D; Singles – Doubles	(Germany) Karin Kschwendt (Australia) Rachel McQuillan; 1–6, 7–6^{(7–4)}, 6–2	(United States) Debbie Graham (United States) Marianne Werdel	(Canada) Patricia Hy (United States) Caroline Kuhlman	(United States) Erika deLone (Australia) Michelle Jaggard-Lai (United States) Debbie Graham (Australia) Kristine Radford
20 Sep	Nichirei International; Tokyo, Japan; Tier II event Hard – $375,000 – 32S/32Q/16D; Singles – Doubles	(South Africa) Amanda Coetzer; 6–3, 6–2	(Japan) Kimiko Date	(Spain) Arantxa Sánchez Vicario (France) Julie Halard	(United States) Amy Frazier (Peru) Laura Arraya (United States) Lindsay Davenport (United States) Marianne Werdel
20 Sep	Nichirei International; Tokyo, Japan; Tier II event Hard – $375,000 – 32S/32Q/16D; Singles – Doubles	(United States) Lisa Raymond (United States) Chanda Rubin; 6–4, 6–1	(South Africa) Amanda Coetzer (United States) Linda Harvey-Wild	(Spain) Arantxa Sánchez Vicario (France) Julie Halard	(United States) Amy Frazier (Peru) Laura Arraya (United States) Lindsay Davenport (United States) Marianne Werdel
27 Sep	Volkswagen Card Cup; Leipzig, Germany; Tier II event Carpet (i) – $375,000 – 32S/32Q/16D; Singles – Doubles	(Germany) Steffi Graf; 6–2, 6–0	(Czech Republic) Jana Novotná	(Austria) Judith Wiesner (Spain) Conchita Martínez	(Belarus) Natasha Zvereva (Germany) Barbara Rittner (Bulgaria) Magdalena Maleeva (United States) Patty Fendick
27 Sep	Volkswagen Card Cup; Leipzig, Germany; Tier II event Carpet (i) – $375,000 – 32S/32Q/16D; Singles – Doubles	(United States) Gigi Fernández (Belarus) Natasha Zvereva; 6–3, 6–2	(Czech Republic) Jana Novotná (Latvia) Larisa Neiland	(Austria) Judith Wiesner (Spain) Conchita Martínez	(Belarus) Natasha Zvereva (Germany) Barbara Rittner (Bulgaria) Magdalena Maleeva (United States) Patty Fendick
27 Sep	Sapporo Ladies Open; Sapporo, Japan; Tier IV event Hard – $100,000 – 32S/32Q/16D; Singles – Doubles	(United States) Linda Harvey-Wild; 6–4, 6–3	(Romania) Irina Spîrlea	(France) Noëlle van Lottum (United States) Lisa Raymond	(Japan) Mana Endo (United States) Shaun Stafford (Japan) Yone Kamio (Belgium) Dominique Monami
27 Sep	Sapporo Ladies Open; Sapporo, Japan; Tier IV event Hard – $100,000 – 32S/32Q/16D; Singles – Doubles	(Indonesia) Yayuk Basuki (Japan) Nana Miyagi; 6–4, 6–2	(Japan) Yone Kamio (Japan) Naoko Kijimuta	(France) Noëlle van Lottum (United States) Lisa Raymond	(Japan) Mana Endo (United States) Shaun Stafford (Japan) Yone Kamio (Belgium) Dominique Monami

=== October ===
Week	Tournament	Champions	Runners-up	Semifinalists	Quarterfinalists
4 Oct	Barilla Indoors; Zürich, Switzerland; Tier I event Carpet (i) – $750,000 – 32S/32Q/16D; Singles – Doubles	(Switzerland) Manuela Maleeva-Fragnière; 6–3, 7–6^{(7–1)}	(United States) Martina Navratilova	(Bulgaria) Magdalena Maleeva (Netherlands) Stephanie Rottier	(Netherlands) Miriam Oremans (France) Nathalie Tauziat (Belarus) Natasha Zvereva (United States) Sandra Cacic
4 Oct	Barilla Indoors; Zürich, Switzerland; Tier I event Carpet (i) – $750,000 – 32S/32Q/16D; Singles – Doubles	(United States) Zina Garrison-Jackson (United States) Martina Navratilova; 6–3, 5–7, 6–3	(United States) Gigi Fernández (Belarus) Natasha Zvereva	(Bulgaria) Magdalena Maleeva (Netherlands) Stephanie Rottier	(Netherlands) Miriam Oremans (France) Nathalie Tauziat (Belarus) Natasha Zvereva (United States) Sandra Cacic
4 Oct	P&G Taiwan Women's Tennis Open; Taipei, Taiwan; Tier IV event Hard – $100,000 – 32S/32Q/16D; Singles – Doubles	(Chinese Taipei) Wang Shi-ting; 6–1, 7–6^{(7–4)}	(United States) Linda Harvey-Wild	(United States) Shaun Stafford (Romania) Cătălina Cristea	(France) Alexandra Fusai (Australia) Danielle Jones (Australia) Kristin Godridge (Germany) Karin Kschwendt
4 Oct	P&G Taiwan Women's Tennis Open; Taipei, Taiwan; Tier IV event Hard – $100,000 – 32S/32Q/16D; Singles – Doubles	(Indonesia) Yayuk Basuki (Japan) Nana Miyagi; 6–4, 6–2	(Australia) Jo-Anne Faull (Australia) Kristine Radford	(United States) Shaun Stafford (Romania) Cătălina Cristea	(France) Alexandra Fusai (Australia) Danielle Jones (Australia) Kristin Godridge (Germany) Karin Kschwendt
11 Oct	Open Languedoc Roussillon; Montpellier, France; Tier IV event Hard – $100,000 – 30S/32Q/16D	(Kazakhstan) Elena Likhovtseva; 6–3, 6–4	(Belgium) Dominique Monami	(Slovakia) Janette Husárová (Belgium) Sabine Appelmans	(Belgium) Els Callens (France) Karine Quentrec (United States) Meredith McGrath (Austria) Barbara Schett
11 Oct	Open Languedoc Roussillon; Montpellier, France; Tier IV event Hard – $100,000 – 30S/32Q/16D	(United States) Meredith McGrath (Germany) Claudia Porwik; 6–4, 6–2	(Slovakia) Janette Husárová (Belgium) Dominique Monami	(Slovakia) Janette Husárová (Belgium) Sabine Appelmans	(Belgium) Els Callens (France) Karine Quentrec (United States) Meredith McGrath (Austria) Barbara Schett
11 Oct	Porsche Tennis Grand Prix; Filderstadt, Germany; Tier II event Hard (i) – $375,000 – 30S/32Q/16D; Singles – Doubles	(France) Mary Pierce; 6–3, 6–3	(Belarus) Natasha Zvereva	(France) Nathalie Tauziat (United States) Zina Garrison-Jackson	(United States) Martina Navratilova (Ukraine) Natalia Medvedeva (Germany) Barbara Rittner (Spain) Conchita Martínez
11 Oct	Porsche Tennis Grand Prix; Filderstadt, Germany; Tier II event Hard (i) – $375,000 – 30S/32Q/16D; Singles – Doubles	(United States) Gigi Fernández (Belarus) Natasha Zvereva; 7–6^{(8–6)}, 6–4	(United States) Patty Fendick (United States) Martina Navratilova	(France) Nathalie Tauziat (United States) Zina Garrison-Jackson	(United States) Martina Navratilova (Ukraine) Natalia Medvedeva (Germany) Barbara Rittner (Spain) Conchita Martínez
18 Oct	Budapest Open; Budapest, Hungary; Tier III event Hard – $150,000 – 32S/32Q/16D	(United States) Zina Garrison-Jackson; 7–5, 6–2	(Belgium) Sabine Appelmans	(France) Julie Halard (Slovakia) Katarína Studeníková	(Argentina) Inés Gorrochategui (Finland) Nanne Dahlman (Belgium) Laurence Courtois (Austria) Judith Wiesner
18 Oct	Budapest Open; Budapest, Hungary; Tier III event Hard – $150,000 – 32S/32Q/16D	(Argentina) Inés Gorrochategui (Netherlands) Caroline Vis; 6–1, 6–3	(Italy) Sandra Cecchini (Argentina) Patricia Tarabini	(France) Julie Halard (Slovakia) Katarína Studeníková	(Argentina) Inés Gorrochategui (Finland) Nanne Dahlman (Belgium) Laurence Courtois (Austria) Judith Wiesner
18 Oct	Autoglass Classic; Brighton, Great Britain; Tier II event Carpet – $375,000 – 32S/32Q/16D; Singles – Doubles	(Czech Republic) Jana Novotná; 6–2, 6–4	(Germany) Anke Huber	(United States) Patty Fendick (France) Mary Pierce	(South Africa) Elna Reinach (Bulgaria) Katerina Maleeva (United Kingdom) Clare Wood (Germany) Christina Singer
18 Oct	Autoglass Classic; Brighton, Great Britain; Tier II event Carpet – $375,000 – 32S/32Q/16D; Singles – Doubles	(Italy) Laura Golarsa (Ukraine) Natalia Medvedeva; 6–3, 1–6, 6–4	(Germany) Anke Huber (Latvia) Larisa Neiland	(United States) Patty Fendick (France) Mary Pierce	(South Africa) Elna Reinach (Bulgaria) Katerina Maleeva (United Kingdom) Clare Wood (Germany) Christina Singer
25 Oct	Bancesa Classic; Curitiba, Brazil; Tier IV event Clay – $100,000 – 32S/32Q/16D	(Germany) Sabine Hack; 6–2, 6–0	(Argentina) Florencia Labat	(Romania) Ruxandra Dragomir (Romania) Irina Spîrlea	(Germany) Maja Živec-Škulj (Argentina) Paola Suárez (Croatia) Nadine Ercegović (Spain) Eva Jiménez
25 Oct	Bancesa Classic; Curitiba, Brazil; Tier IV event Clay – $100,000 – 32S/32Q/16D	(Germany) Sabine Hack (Germany) Veronika Martinek; 6–2, 7–6^{(7–4)}	(Brazil) Cláudia Chabalgoity (Brazil) Andrea Vieira	(Romania) Ruxandra Dragomir (Romania) Irina Spîrlea	(Germany) Maja Živec-Škulj (Argentina) Paola Suárez (Croatia) Nadine Ercegović (Spain) Eva Jiménez
25 Oct	Nokia Grand Prix; Essen, Germany; Tier II event Hard (i) – $375,000 – 32S/32Q/16D; Singles – Doubles	(Ukraine) Natalia Medvedeva; 6–7^{(4–7)}, 7–5, 6–4	(Spain) Conchita Martínez	(Spain) Arantxa Sánchez Vicario (Belgium) Sabine Appelmans	(France) Mary Pierce (South Africa) Elna Reinach (Switzerland) Manuela Maleeva-Fragnière (Bulgaria) Katerina Maleeva
25 Oct	Nokia Grand Prix; Essen, Germany; Tier II event Hard (i) – $375,000 – 32S/32Q/16D; Singles – Doubles	(Spain) Arantxa Sánchez Vicario (Czech Republic) Helena Suková; 6–2, 6–2	(Germany) Wiltrud Probst (Germany) Christina Singer	(Spain) Arantxa Sánchez Vicario (Belgium) Sabine Appelmans	(France) Mary Pierce (South Africa) Elna Reinach (Switzerland) Manuela Maleeva-Fragnière (Bulgaria) Katerina Maleeva

=== November ===
Week	Tournament	Champions	Runners-up	Semifinalists	Quarterfinalists
1 Nov	Bell Challenge; Quebec City, Canada; Tier III event Carpet (i) – $150,000 – 32S/32Q/16D; Singles – Doubles	(France) Nathalie Tauziat; 6–4, 6–1	(Bulgaria) Katerina Maleeva	(Canada) Patricia Hy (Canada) Helen Kelesi	(United States) Debbie Graham (Mexico) Angélica Gavaldón (United States) Linda Harvey-Wild (Belarus) Natasha Zvereva
1 Nov	Bell Challenge; Quebec City, Canada; Tier III event Carpet (i) – $150,000 – 32S/32Q/16D; Singles – Doubles	(United States) Katrina Adams (Netherlands) Manon Bollegraf; 6–4, 6–4	(Bulgaria) Katerina Maleeva (France) Nathalie Tauziat	(Canada) Patricia Hy (Canada) Helen Kelesi	(United States) Debbie Graham (Mexico) Angélica Gavaldón (United States) Linda Harvey-Wild (Belarus) Natasha Zvereva
1 Nov	Bank of the West Classic; Oakland, United States; Tier II event Carpet (i) – $375,000 – 28S/16D; Singles – Doubles	(United States) Martina Navratilova; 6–2, 7–6^{(7–1)}	(United States) Zina Garrison-Jackson	(United States) Lindsay Davenport (United States) Lori McNeil	(Croatia) Iva Majoli (United States) Caroline Kuhlman (United States) Ann Grossman (United States) Mary Joe Fernández
1 Nov	Bank of the West Classic; Oakland, United States; Tier II event Carpet (i) – $375,000 – 28S/16D; Singles – Doubles	(United States) Patty Fendick (United States) Meredith McGrath; 6–2, 6–0	(South Africa) Amanda Coetzer (Argentina) Inés Gorrochategui	(United States) Lindsay Davenport (United States) Lori McNeil	(Croatia) Iva Majoli (United States) Caroline Kuhlman (United States) Ann Grossman (United States) Mary Joe Fernández
8 Nov	Virginia Slims of Philadelphia; Philadelphia, United States; Tier I event Carpet (i) – $750,000 – 32S/32Q/16D; Singles – Doubles	(Spain) Conchita Martínez; 6–3, 6–3	(Germany) Steffi Graf	(United States) Kimberly Po (United States) Amy Frazier	(South Africa) Amanda Coetzer (United States) Zina Garrison-Jackson (Argentina) Gabriela Sabatini (Belarus) Natasha Zvereva
8 Nov	Virginia Slims of Philadelphia; Philadelphia, United States; Tier I event Carpet (i) – $750,000 – 32S/32Q/16D; Singles – Doubles	(United States) Katrina Adams (Netherlands) Manon Bollegraf; 6–2, 4–6, 7–6^{(9–7)}	(Spain) Conchita Martínez (Latvia) Larisa Neiland	(United States) Kimberly Po (United States) Amy Frazier	(South Africa) Amanda Coetzer (United States) Zina Garrison-Jackson (Argentina) Gabriela Sabatini (Belarus) Natasha Zvereva
15 Nov	Virginia Slims Championships; New York City, United States; Year-End Championships; Carpet (i) – $3,708,500 – 16S/8D; Singles – Doubles	(Germany) Steffi Graf; 6–1, 6–4, 3–6, 6–1	(Spain) Arantxa Sánchez Vicario	(Germany) Anke Huber (France) Mary Pierce	(South Africa) Amanda Coetzer (Spain) Conchita Martínez (United States) Martina Navratilova (Czech Republic) Jana Novotná
15 Nov	Virginia Slims Championships; New York City, United States; Year-End Championships; Carpet (i) – $3,708,500 – 16S/8D; Singles – Doubles	(United States) Gigi Fernández (Belarus) Natasha Zvereva; 6–3, 7–5	(Latvia) Larisa Neiland (Czech Republic) Jana Novotná	(Germany) Anke Huber (France) Mary Pierce	(South Africa) Amanda Coetzer (Spain) Conchita Martínez (United States) Martina Navratilova (Czech Republic) Jana Novotná

== Rankings ==
Below are the 1993 WTA year-end rankings in both singles and doubles competition:

Singles Year-end Ranking
No	Player Name	Points	1992	Change
1	Steffi Graf (GER)	409.1746	2	+1
2	Arantxa Sánchez Vicario (ESP)	243.5556	4	+2
3	Martina Navratilova (USA)	221.4989	5	+2
4	Conchita Martínez (ESP)	192.3314	8	+4
5	Gabriela Sabatini (ARG)	146.4048	3	-2
6	Jana Novotná (CZE)	145.1179	10	+4
7	Mary Joe Fernández (USA)	138.2162	6	-1
8	Monica Seles (YUG)	133.5178	1	-7
9	Jennifer Capriati (USA)	126.3750	7	-2
10	Anke Huber (GER)	124.5625	11	+1
11	Manuela Maleeva-Fragnière (SUI)	103.5505	9	-2
12	Mary Pierce (FRA)	93.6875	13	+1
13	Kimiko Date (JPN)	89.2917	21	+9
14	Zina Garrison-Jackson (USA)	86.2291	18	+4
15	Amanda Coetzer (RSA)	85.8500	17	+2
16	Magdalena Maleeva (BUL)	84.9667	20	+4
17	Helena Suková (CZE)	82.0698	12	-5
18	Nathalie Tauziat (FRA)	79.8320	14	-4
19	Natalia Zvereva (BLR)	73.0000	23	+4
20	Lindsay Davenport (USA)	63.8125	159	+139

Doubles Year-end Ranking
No	Player Name	Points	1992	Change
1	Gigi Fernández (USA)	390.4866	6	+5
2	Helena Suková (CZE)	372.8846	1	-1
3	Natasha Zvereva (BLR)	367.8698	2	-1
4	Jana Novotná (CZE)	306.9450	4	=
5	Larisa Neiland (LAT)	266.3064	5	=
6	Arantxa Sánchez Vicario (ESP)	264.7767	3	-3
7	Pam Shriver (USA)	196.8319	7	=
8	Rennae Stubbs (AUS)	196.8024	13	+5
9	Elizabeth Smylie (AUS)	181.9737	55	+46
10	Conchita Martínez (ESP)	174.5000	8	-2
11	Martina Navratilova (USA)	174.5000	9	-2
12	Lori McNeil (USA)	172.6210	14	+2
13	Zina Garrison-Jackson (USA)	168.4706	10	-3
14	Patty Fendick (USA)	163.3963	16	+2
15	Mary Joe Fernández (USA)	149.0833	11	-4
16	Katrina Adams (USA)	145.5000	18	-2
17	Manuela Maleeva-Fragnière (SUI)	141.7857	264	+247
18	Manon Bollegraf (NED)	134.5909	19	+1
19	Inés Gorrochategui (ARG)	133.5238	36	+17
20	Amanda Coetzer (RSA)	132.6000	27	+7

== Statistical information ==
List of players and titles won, last name alphabetically:

- Steffi Graf – Delray Beach, Hilton Head, Berlin, Roland Garros, Wimbledon, San Diego, Canada, US Open, Leipzig, Tour Championships (10)
- Conchita Martínez – Brisbane, Houston, Rome, Stratton Mountain, Philadelphia (5)
- Martina Navratilova – Tokyo, Paris, Eastbourne, Manhattan Beach, Oakland (5)
- Arantxa Sánchez Vicario – Miami, Amelia Island, Barcelona, Hamburg (4)
- Yayuk Basuki – Pattaya City, Jakarta (2)
- Radka Bobková – Liege, Palermo (2)
- Amanda Coetzer – Melbourne, Tokyo Indoors (2)
- Zina Garrison-Jackson – Oklahoma City, Budapest (2)
- Linda Harvey-Wild – San Juan, Sapporo (2)
- Manuela Maleeva-Fragnière – Linz, Zurich (2)
- Natalia Medvedeva – Prague 2, Essen (2)
- Jana Novotná – Osaka, Brighton (2)
- Monica Seles – Australian Open, Chicago (2)
- Wang Shi-ting – Hong Kong, Taiwan (2)
- Jennifer Capriati – Sydney (1)
- Kimiko Date – Tokyo 2 (1)
- Lindsay Davenport – Lucerne (1)
- Mary Joe Fernández – Indian Wells (1)
- Marzia Grossi – San Marino (1)
- Sabine Hack – Curitiba (1)
- Anke Huber – Kitzbühel (1)
- Elena Likhovtseva – Montpellier (1)
- Lori McNeil – Birmingham (1)
- Mary Pierce – Filderstadt (1)
- Nicole Provis – Kuala Lumpur (1)
- Elna Reinach – Auckland (1)
- Larisa Savchenko – Schenectady (1)
- Naoko Sawamatsu – Strasbourg (1)
- Brenda Schultz – Taranto (1)
- Nathalie Tauziat – Quebec City (1)

The following players won their first title:

- (South Africa) Amanda Coetzer
- (South Africa) Elna Reinach
- (Czech Republic) Radka Bobková
- (United States) Linda Harvey-Wild
- (Italy) Marzia Grossi
- (Chinese Taipei) Wang Shi-ting
- (Kazakhstan) Elena Likhovtseva
- (United States) Lindsay Davenport

== See also ==
- 1993 ATP Tour
