= 1993 Nichirei International – Singles =

Singles
- 1993 Nichirei International

Final
- Champion: (South Africa) Amanda Coetzer
- Runner-up: (Japan) Kimiko Date
- Score: 6–3, 6–2

Details
- Draw: 32 (2WC/4Q)
- Seeds: 8

Events
Singles	Doubles
← 1992 ·	Nichirei International Championships	· 1994 →

Monica Seles was the defending champion, but could not compete this year due to the stabbing received in late April.

Amanda Coetzer won the title by defeating Kimiko Date 6–3, 6–2 in the final.

== Seeds ==
1. (Spain) Arantxa Sánchez Vicario (semifinals)
2. (Argentina) Gabriela Sabatini (second round)
3. (Japan) Kimiko Date (final)
4. (South Africa) Amanda Coetzer (champion)
5. (Bulgaria) Katerina Maleeva (first round)
6. (United States) Lindsay Davenport (quarterfinals)
7. (Japan) Naoko Sawamatsu (second round)
8. (France) Julie Halard (semifinals)

== Draw ==
=== Key ===
- Q = Qualifier
- WC = Wild card
- LL = Lucky loser
- Alt = Alternate
- SE = Special exempt
- PR = Protected ranking
- ITF = ITF entry
- JE = Junior exempt
- w/o = Walkover
- r = Retired
- d = Defaulted
- SR = Special ranking

=== Finals ===
Semifinals
1	(Spain) Arantxa Sánchez Vicario	3	4
4	(South Africa) Amanda Coetzer	6	6
3	(Japan) Kimiko Date	6	7^{7}
8	(France) Julie Halard	1	6^{3}

Final
4	(South Africa) Amanda Coetzer	6	6
3	(Japan) Kimiko Date	3	2

=== Top half ===
First round
1	(Spain) A Sánchez Vicario	6	6
Q	(Japan) R Hiraki	2	0
(France) A Fusai	6	6
WC	(Japan) Y Kamio	2	2
(United States) C Kuhlman	5	3
(United States) D Graham	7	6
(United States) A Frazier	6	6
5	(Bulgaria) K Maleeva	1	4
4	(South Africa) A Coetzer	6	6
(United States) L Raymond	2	4
(Belgium) D Monami	7^{7}	2	6
(Australia) M Jaggard-Lai	6^{4}	6	4
(France) N van Lottum	3	1
(Peru) L Arraya	6	6
(United States) C Rubin	6	2	0
7	(Japan) N Sawamatsu	3	6	6

Second round
1	(Spain) A Sánchez Vicario	6	6
(France) A Fusai	1	2
(United States) D Graham	2	4
(United States) A Frazier	6	6
4	(South Africa) A Coetzer	6	6
(Belgium) D Monami	2	2
(Peru) L Arraya	7	3	6
7	(Japan) N Sawamatsu	5	6	3

Quarterfinals
1	(Spain) A Sánchez Vicario	6	6
(United States) A Frazier	2	3
4	(South Africa) A Coetzer	6	6
(Peru) L Arraya	4	1

Semifinals
1	(Spain) A Sánchez Vicario	3	4
4	(South Africa) A Coetzer	6	6

=== Bottom half ===
First round
6	(United States) L Davenport	6	5	7
(Japan) M Endo	4	7	5
(United States) L Harvey-Wild	3	6	3
WC	(Japan) A Sugiyama	6	2	6
(Chinese Taipei) S-t Wang	6^{5}	6	6
(United States) R White	7^{7}	4	3
(Luxembourg) K Kschwendt	4	6	3
3	(Japan) K Date	6	3	6
8	(France) J Halard	2	6	6
Q	(United States) A Keller	6	1	3
Q	(Romania) I Spîrlea	2	3
(Australia) R McQuillan	6	6
(United States) M Werdel	3	6	6
Q	(Japan) N Kijimuta	6	2	2
(China) F Li	1	2
2	(Argentina) G Sabatini	6	6

Second round
6	(United States) L Davenport	2	6	6
WC	(Japan) A Sugiyama	6	1	2
(Chinese Taipei) S-t Wang	4	2
3	(Japan) K Date	6	6
8	(France) J Halard	6	7^{7}
(Australia) R McQuillan	4	6^{1}
(United States) M Werdel	6	3	7
2	(Argentina) G Sabatini	3	6	5

Quarterfinals
6	(United States) L Davenport	2	4
3	(Japan) K Date	6	6
8	(France) J Halard	6	6
(United States) M Werdel	1	3

Semifinals
3	(Japan) K Date	6	7^{7}
8	(France) J Halard	1	6^{3}
