= 1994 Nichirei International Championships – Doubles =

Doubles
- 1994 Nichirei International Championships

Final
- Champions: (France) Julie Halard (Spain) Arantxa Sánchez Vicario
- Runners-up: (United States) Amy Frazier (Japan) Rika Hiraki
- Score: 6–1, 0–6, 6–1

Details
- Draw: 16 (1WC/1Q)
- Seeds: 4

Events
Singles	Doubles
← 1993 ·	Nichirei International Championships	· 1995 →

Lisa Raymond and Chanda Rubin were the defending champions, but none competed this year.

Julie Halard and Arantxa Sánchez Vicario won the title by defeating Amy Frazier and Rika Hiraki 6–1, 0–6, 6–1 in the final.

== Seeds ==
1. (France) Julie Halard / (Spain) Arantxa Sánchez Vicario (champions)
2. (Australia) Catherine Barclay / (Australia) Kerry-Anne Guse (first round)
3. (United States) Debbie Graham / (United States) Marianne Werdel (first round)
4. (Germany) Sabine Hack / (Argentina) Mercedes Paz (first round)

== Draw ==
=== Key ===
- Q = Qualifier
- WC = Wild card
- LL = Lucky loser
- Alt = Alternate
- SE = Special exempt
- PR = Protected ranking
- ITF = ITF entry
- JE = Junior exempt
- w/o = Walkover
- r = Retired
- d = Defaulted
- SR = Special ranking

=== Draw ===
First round
1	(France) J Halard (Spain) A Sánchez Vicario	6	6
WC	(Japan) M Saeki (Japan) Y Yoshida	1	2
(Japan) Y Kamio (Japan) N Kijimuta	6	6
(Japan) E Iida (Australia) D Jones	3	0
4	(Germany) S Hack (Argentina) M Paz	6^{5}	3
(Japan) H Nagano (South Korea) S-h Park	7^{7}	6
Q	(Venezuela) M Vento (United States) J Watanabe	3	1
(Japan) K Nagatsuka (Japan) A Sugiyama	6	6
(United States) S Collins (United Kingdom) C Wood	4	5
(Japan) M Endo (Japan) N Sawamatsu	6	7
(Australia) A Frazier (Japan) R Hiraki	6	6
3	(United States) D Graham (United States) M Werdel	3	0
(Czech Republic) E Martincová (United States) D Scott	2	6	6
(Japan) M Donoshiro (Japan) Y Tanaka	6	3	1
(South Africa) L Horn (Belgium) D Monami	2	6	7
2	(Australia) C Barclay (Australia) KA Guse	6	4	5

Quarterfinals
1	(France) J Halard (Spain) A Sánchez Vicario	3	6	7
(Japan) Y Kamio (Japan) N Kijimuta	6	4	5
(Japan) H Nagano (South Korea) S-h Park	3	2
(Japan) K Nagatsuka (Japan) A Sugiyama	6	6
(Japan) M Endo (Japan) N Sawamatsu	0	2
(Australia) A Frazier (Japan) R Hiraki	6	6
(Czech Republic) E Martincová (United States) D Scott	6	6^{1}	2
(South Africa) L Horn (Belgium) D Monami	2	7^{7}	6

Semifinals
1	(France) J Halard (Spain) A Sánchez Vicario	6	4	6
(Japan) K Nagatsuka (Japan) A Sugiyama	4	6	1
(Australia) A Frazier (Japan) R Hiraki	7^{8}	6
(South Africa) L Horn (Belgium) D Monami	6^{6}	4

Final
1	(France) J Halard (Spain) A Sánchez Vicario	6	0	6
(Australia) A Frazier (Japan) R Hiraki	1	6	1
