= 1994 Nichirei International Championships – Singles =

Singles
- 1994 Nichirei International Championships

Final
- Champion: (Spain) Arantxa Sánchez Vicario
- Runner-up: (United States) Amy Frazier
- Score: 6–1, 6–2

Details
- Draw: 32 (2WC/3Q/1LL)
- Seeds: 8

Events
Singles	Doubles
- Nichirei International Championships

Amanda Coetzer was the defending champion, but did not compete this year.

Arantxa Sánchez Vicario won the title by defeating Amy Frazier 6–1, 6–2 in the final.

== Seeds ==
1. (Spain) Arantxa Sánchez Vicario (champion)
2. (Japan) Kimiko Date (second round)
3. (United States) Lindsay Davenport (second round)
4. (Argentina) Gabriela Sabatini (semifinals)
5. (United States) ~~Mary Joe Fernández~~ (withdrew)
6. (Germany) Sabine Hack (quarterfinals)
7. (United States) Amy Frazier (final)
8. (France) Julie Halard (second round)
9. (Japan) Naoko Sawamatsu (second round)

== Draw ==
Key

- Q = Qualifier
- WC = Wild card
- LL = Lucky loser
- Alt = Alternate
- ITF = ITF entry
- PR = Protected ranking
- SR = Special ranking
- SE = Special exempt
- JE = Junior exempt
- JR = Junior Accelerator Programme entrant
- CO = College Accelerator Programme entrant
- NG = Next Gen Accelerator Program entrant
- w/o = Walkover
- r = Retired
- d = Defaulted

=== Finals ===
Semifinals
1	(Spain) Arantxa Sánchez Vicario	6	2	6
(Japan) Nana Miyagi	2	6	4
4	(Argentina) Gabriela Sabatini	1	3
7	(United States) Amy Frazier	6	6

Final
1	(Spain) Arantxa Sánchez Vicario	6	6
7	(United States) Amy Frazier	1	2

=== Top half ===
First round
1	(Spain) A Sánchez Vicario	6	6
(Japan) N Kijimuta	0	0
(Japan) K Nagatsuka	2	1
(United States) D Graham	6	6
(United Kingdom) C Wood	2	5
(United States) M Werdel	6	7
(Argentina) M Paz	4	6^{2}
8	(France) J Halard	6	7^{7}
3	(United States) L Davenport	6	4	6
Q	(Japan) K Shibata	2	6	0
(South Korea) S-h Park	5	1
(Japan) N Miyagi	7	6
WC	(Japan) Y Yoshida	6	6^{12}	6
Q	(Japan) K Nagatomi	4	7^{14}	4
(Canada) J Nejedly	4	1
6	(Germany) S Hack	6	6

Second round
1	(Spain) A Sánchez Vicario	6	6
(United States) D Graham	1	2
(United States) M Werdel	6	6
8	(France) J Halard	1	1
3	(United States) L Davenport	6	4	4
(Japan) N Miyagi	3	6	6
WC	(Japan) Y Yoshida	1	0
6	(Germany) S Hack	6	6

Quarterfinals
1	(Spain) A Sánchez Vicario	6	6
(United States) M Werdel	4	0
(Japan) N Miyagi	7^{7}	7
6	(Germany) S Hack	6^{3}	5

Semifinals
1	(Spain) A Sánchez Vicario	6	2	6
(Japan) N Miyagi	2	6	4

=== Bottom half ===
First round
9	(Japan) N Sawamatsu	6	4	6
(Chinese Taipei) S-t Wang	0	6	1
(Japan) A Sugiyama	6	6
WC	(Japan) Y Tanaka	2	4
(Belgium) D Monami	6	7^{7}
(Japan) Y Kamio	0	6^{4}
(United States) J Watanabe	0	0
4	(Argentina) G Sabatini	6	6
7	(United States) A Frazier	6	6
Q	(Japan) H Nagano	2	2
LL	(Australia) KA Guse	6	6
(Czech Republic) E Martincová	4	1
(Japan) R Hiraki	0	0
(Japan) M Endo	6	6
Q	(Japan) A Hirose	4	0
2	(Japan) K Date	6	6

Second round
9	(Japan) N Sawamatsu	3	1
(Japan) A Sugiyama	6	6
(Belgium) D Monami	1	2
4	(Argentina) G Sabatini	6	6
7	(United States) A Frazier	6	7
LL	(Australia) KA Guse	2	5
(Japan) M Endo	7	2	6
2	(Japan) K Date	5	6	4

Quarterfinals
(Japan) A Sugiyama	3	7^{7}	5
4	(Argentina) G Sabatini	6	6^{5}	7
7	(United States) A Frazier	6	7
(Japan) M Endo	2	5

Semifinals
4	(Argentina) G Sabatini	1	3
7	(United States) A Frazier	6	6
