= 1992 Nichirei International Championships – Singles =

Singles
- 1992 Nichirei International Championships

Final
- Champion: (Federal Republic of Yugoslavia) Monica Seles
- Runner-up: (Argentina) Gabriela Sabatini
- Score: 6–2, 6–0

Details
- Draw: 28 (2WC/4Q/1LL)
- Seeds: 8

Events
Singles	Doubles
← 1991 ·	Nichirei International Championships	· 1993 →

Monica Seles was the defending champion and successfully defender her title, by defeating Gabriela Sabatini 6–2, 6–0 in the final.

== Seeds ==
1. (Federal Republic of Yugoslavia) Monica Seles (champion)
2. (Argentina) Gabriela Sabatini (final)
3. (United States) Mary Joe Fernández (semifinals)
4. (Bulgaria) Katerina Maleeva (semifinals)
5. (South Africa) Amanda Coetzer (second round)
6. (United States) Amy Frazier (first round)
7. (Japan) Kimiko Date (quarterfinals)
8. (Japan) Naoko Sawamatsu (quarterfinals)

== Draw ==
=== Key ===
- Q = Qualifier
- WC = Wild card
- LL = Lucky loser
- Alt = Alternate
- SE = Special exempt
- PR = Protected ranking
- ITF = ITF entry
- JE = Junior exempt
- w/o = Walkover
- r = Retired
- d = Defaulted
- SR = Special ranking

=== Finals ===
Semifinals
1	(Federal Republic of Yugoslavia) Monica Seles	6	3	6
3	(United States) Mary Joe Fernández	0	6	4
4	(Bulgaria) Katerina Maleeva	3	3
2	(Argentina) Gabriela Sabatini	6	6

Final
1	(Federal Republic of Yugoslavia) Monica Seles	6	6
2	(Argentina) Gabriela Sabatini	2	0

=== Top half ===
First round
(Chinese Taipei) S-t Wang	6	3	6
(United States) D Graham	2	6	2
(United States) K Po	6	6
(Japan) M Kidowaki	2	1
WC	(Japan) N Miyagi	7	2	2
8	(Japan) N Sawamatsu	5	6	6
(Australia) J Byrne	6	6
(Indonesia) Y Basuki	1	4
(United Kingdom) M Javer	3	3
Q	(Japan) K Nagatsuka	6	6
LL	(Japan) H Nagano	4	6	2
5	(South Africa) A Coetzer	6	4	6

Second round
1	(Federal Republic of Yugoslavia) M Seles	6	6
(Chinese Taipei) S-t Wang	0	1
(United States) K Po	6^{3}	4
8	(Japan) N Sawamatsu	7^{7}	6
3	(United States) MJ Fernández	6	6
(Australia) J Byrne	1	1
Q	(Japan) K Nagatsuka	5	6	6
5	(South Africa) A Coetzer	7	3	1

Quarterfinals
1	(Federal Republic of Yugoslavia) M Seles	6	6
8	(Japan) N Sawamatsu	1	0
3	(United States) MJ Fernández	6	6
Q	(Japan) K Nagatsuka	0	2

Semifinals
1	(Federal Republic of Yugoslavia) M Seles	6	3	6
3	(United States) MJ Fernández	0	6	4

=== Bottom half ===
First round
6	(United States) A Frazier	1	4
(United States) M Werdel	6	6
(United States) R White	6	6
Q	(New Zealand) J Richardson	3	3
(United States) A Grossman	6	6
WC	(Japan) A Sugiyama	3	1
7	(Japan) K Date	6	6
(United States) S Sloane-Lundy	0	1
Q	(Australia) L Field	6	3	2
Q	(United States) S Stafford	3	6	6
(Japan) R Hiraki	6	6
(United States) D Faber	4	1

Second round
(United States) M Werdel	6	6
(United States) R White	1	3
(United States) A Grossman	3	1
4	(Bulgaria) K Maleeva	6	6
7	(Japan) K Date	6	6
Q	(United States) S Stafford	1	1
(Japan) R Hiraki	3	3
2	(Argentina) G Sabatini	6	6

Quarterfinals
(United States) M Werdel	4	4
4	(Bulgaria) K Maleeva	6	6
7	(Japan) K Date	4	2
2	(Argentina) G Sabatini	6	6

Semifinals
4	(Bulgaria) K Maleeva	3	3
2	(Argentina) G Sabatini	6	6
