= 1993 Nichirei International – Doubles =

Doubles
- 1993 Nichirei International

Final
- Champions: (United States) Lisa Raymond; (United States) Chanda Rubin
- Runners-up: (South Africa) Amanda Coetzer; (United States) Linda Harvey-Wild
- Score: 6–4, 6–1

Events
Singles	Doubles
← 1992 ·	Nichirei International Championships	· 1994 →

Mary Joe Fernández and Robin White were the defending champions, but Fernández did not compete this year. White teamed up with Lindsay Davenport and lost in the quarterfinals to tournament winners Lisa Raymond and Chanda Rubin.

Raymond and Rubin won the title by defeating Amanda Coetzer and Linda Harvey-Wild 6–4, 6–1 in the final.

== Seeds ==
1. (South Africa) Amanda Coetzer / (United States) Linda Harvey-Wild (final)
2. (United States) Lindsay Davenport / (United States) Robin White (quarterfinals)
3. (United States) Debbie Graham / (United States) Marianne Werdel (first round)
4. (Indonesia) Yayuk Basuki / (Japan) Nana Miyagi (quarterfinals)

== Draw ==
=== Key ===
- Q = Qualifier
- WC = Wild card
- LL = Lucky loser
- Alt = Alternate
- SE = Special exempt
- PR = Protected ranking
- ITF = ITF entry
- JE = Junior exempt
- w/o = Walkover
- r = Retired
- d = Defaulted
- SR = Special ranking

=== Draw ===
First round

Quarterfinals

Semifinals

Final

1
(South Africa) A Coetzer
(United States) L Harvey-Wild
7^{8}
6

- (France) A Fusai
- (Belgium) D Monami
6^{6}
4

1
(South Africa) A Coetzer
(United States) L Harvey-Wild
6
6

(Australia) M Jaggard-Lai
(United States) C MacGregor
6
6

- (Australia) M Jaggard-Lai
- (United States) C MacGregor
3
3

- (Germany) K Kschwendt
- (Australia) R McQuillan
3
1

1
(South Africa) A Coetzer
(United States) L Harvey-Wild
6
6

3
- (United States) D Graham
- (United States) M Werdel
4
4

- (Peru) L Arraya
- (United States) B Bowes
3
0

(Peru) L Arraya
(United States) B Bowes
6
6

(Peru) L Arraya
(United States) B Bowes
6
6

(United States) A Frazier
(Japan) R Hiraki
7
3
6

- (United States) A Frazier
- (Japan) R Hiraki
4
2

- (Japan) E Iida
- (Japan) M Kidowaki
5
6
3

1
- (South Africa) A Coetzer
- (United States) L Harvey-Wild
4
1

(Australia) JA Faull
(New Zealand) J Richardson
6^{5}
6
6

(United States) L Raymond
(United States) C Rubin
6
6

Q
- (Japan) A Kijimuta
- (Japan) N Kijimuta
7^{7}
3
3

(Australia) JA Faull
(New Zealand) J Richardson
6
6

- (United States) A Keller
- (France) N van Lottum
7^{9}
4
4

4
- (Indonesia) Y Basuki
- (Japan) N Miyagi
3
2

4
(Indonesia) Y Basuki
(Japan) N Miyagi
6^{7}
6
6

- (Australia) JA Faull
- (New Zealand) J Richardson
3
6^{4}

(United States) L Raymond
(United States) C Rubin
6
4
6

(United States) L Raymond
(United States) C Rubin
6
7^{7}

WC
- (Japan) M Donoshiro
- (Japan) A Sugiyama
4
6
1

(United States) L Raymond
(United States) C Rubin
2
6
6

- (Japan) K Date
- (France) J Halard
5
6
4

2
- (United States) L Davenport
- (United States) R White
6
4
2

2
(United States) L Davenport
(United States) R White
7
2
6
