= 1993 Nichirei International =

- Date: 21–26 September
- Edition: 4th
- Category: Tier II
- Draw: 32S / 16D
- Prize money: $375,000
- Surface: Hard / outdoor
- Location: Tokyo, Japan
- Venue: Ariake Coliseum

Champions

Singles
- (South Africa) Amanda Coetzer

Doubles
- (United States) Lisa Raymond / (United States) Chanda Rubin
← 1992 ·	Nichirei International Championships	· 1994 →

The 1993 Nichirei International was a women's tennis tournament played on outdoor hard courts at the Ariake Coliseum in Tokyo, Japan that was part of Tier II of the 1993 WTA Tour. It was the fourth edition of the tournament and was held from 21 September through 26 September 1993. Fourth-seeded Amanda Coetzer won the singles title and earned $75,000 first-prize money.

== Finals ==
=== Singles ===
(South Africa) Amanda Coetzer defeated (Japan) Kimiko Date 6–3, 6–2

- It was Coetzer's 2nd singles title of the year and of her career.

=== Doubles ===
(United States) Lisa Raymond / (United States) Chanda Rubin defeated (South Africa) Amanda Coetzer / (United States) Linda Harvey-Wild 6–4, 6–1
