= 1992 Nichirei International Championships =

- Date: 22–27 September
- Edition: 3rd
- Category: Tier II
- Draw: 28S / 16D
- Prize money: $350,000
- Surface: Hard / outdoor
- Location: Tokyo, Japan
- Venue: Ariake Coliseum

Champions

Singles
- (Federal Republic of Yugoslavia) Monica Seles

Doubles
- (United States) Mary Joe Fernández / (United States) Robin White
← 1991 ·	Nichirei International Championships	· 1993 →

The 1992 Nichirei International Championships was a women's tennis tournament played on outdoor hard courts at the Ariake Coliseum in Tokyo, Japan that was part of Tier II of the 1992 WTA Tour. It was the third edition of the tournament and was held from 22 September through 27 September 1992. First-seeded Monica Seles won the singles title and earned $70,000 first-prize money.

== Finals ==
=== Singles ===
(Federal Republic of Yugoslavia) Monica Seles defeated (Argentina) Gabriela Sabatini 6–2, 6–0

- It was Seles' 8th singles title of the year and the 28th of her career.

=== Doubles ===
(United States) Mary Joe Fernández / (United States) Robin White defeated (Indonesia) Yayuk Basuki / (Japan) Nana Miyagi 6–4, 6–4
