= Masako Yanagi =

Japanese tennis player (born 1959)

Masako Yanagi 柳 昌子
- Country (sports): Japan
- Residence: Tokyo, Japan
- Born: 11 November 1959 (age 66) Osaka, Japan
- Retired: 1994
- Plays: Left-handed
- Prize money: $155,263

Singles
- Career record: 132–136
- Career titles: 1 ITF
- Highest ranking: 89 (2 April 1984)

Grand Slam singles results
- Australian Open: 2R (1985)
- French Open: 3R (1988)
- Wimbledon: 2R (1988)
- US Open: 1R (1986,1988)

Doubles
- Career record: 59–79
- Career titles: 2 ITF
- Highest ranking: 85 (5 January 1987)

Grand Slam doubles results
- Australian Open: 1R (1987-1989)
- French Open: 2R (1987)
- Wimbledon: 1R (1984-1988)
- US Open: 1R (1986,1987)

Masako Yanagi (柳 昌子, Yanagi Masako; born 11 November 1959) is a Japanese former women's singles tennis and doubles tennis player.

She was the top-ranked player in Japan in 1979 and was ranked as high as No. 89 in the world. She reached the third round of the 1988 French Open and also played in the Australian Open. She lived in Tokyo. Yanagi reached 4 singles and 6 doubles finals. She has won 1 singles title and 2 doubles titles on the ITF.

Masako Yanagi played in one singles and two doubles ITF Independent Tour finals in 1982.

== ITF finals ==
$25,000 tournaments
$10,000 tournaments

=== Singles (1–3) ===
Result	No.	Date	Tournament	Surface	Opponent	Score
Loss	1.	11 October 1992	Tokyo, Japan	Hard	(Japan) Miki Mizokuchi	5–7, 6–1, 1–6
Loss	2.	18 October 1992	Tokyo, Japan	Hard	(Japan) Mami Donoshiro	5–7, 4–6
Win	3.	25 October 1992	Kyoto, Japan	Hard	(Japan) Miki Mizokuchi	6–2, 6–4
Loss	4.	24 January 1993	McAllen, United States	Hard	(United States) Louise Allen	4-6, 6-7

=== Doubles (2–4) ===
Result	No.	Date	Tournament	Surface	Partner	Opponents	Score
Loss	1.	10 July 1983	Landskrona, Sweden	Clay	(Japan) Emiko Okagawa	(United Kingdom) Lucy Gordon (Sweden) Mimmi Wikstedt	5-7, 3-6
Win	2.	12 October 1992	Tokyo, Japan	Hard	(Japan) Hiroko Mochizuki	(Japan) Yoshiko Sasano (Japan) Yoshiko Wauke	6–2, 3–6, 6–2
Loss	3.	19 October 1992	Kyoto, Japan	Hard	(Japan) Sandy Sureephong	(Japan) Yuko Hosoki (Japan) Naoko Kijimuta	3–6, 3–6
Winner	4.	26 October 1992	Saga, Japan	Clay	(Japan) Ayako Hirose	(Czechoslovakia) Katarína Studeníková (Czechoslovakia) Eva Martincová	6–2, 6–0
Loss	5.	18 October 1993	Kugayama, Japan	Hard	(Japan) Mana Endo	(Japan) Mami Donoshiro (Japan) Yuka Tanaka	3–6, 3–6
Loss	6.	31 October 1993	Kyoto, Japan	Hard	(Japan) Mana Endo	(Australia) Maija Avotins (Australia) Lisa McShea	6–7^{(5)}, 5–7

== ITF Independent Tour ==
=== Singles ===
Legend (0-1)
Win
Loss

Result	No.	Date	Tournament	Location	Surface	Opponent	Score
Loss	1.	May 1982	Cumberland Tournament	Hampstead, UK	Clay	(United Kingdom) Kate Brasher	1–6, 1–6

=== Doubles ===
Legend (2-0)
Win
Loss

Result	No.	Date	Tournament	Location	Surface	Partner	Opponents	Score
Win	1.	May 1982	Cumberland Tournament	Hampstead, UK	Clay	(New Zealand) Linda Stewart	(United Kingdom) Lesley Charles (United Kingdom) Sara Gomer	6–3, 6–1
Win	2.	May 1982	Paddington Tournament	London, UK	Hard	(New Zealand) Linda Stewart	(United States) Mary-Ann Colville (Australia) Wendy Gilchrist	6–3, 6–4
