= Maija Avotins =

Australian tennis player

- Country (sports): Australia
- Born: 10 April 1975 (age 49)
- Prize money: $16,134

Singles
- Highest ranking: No. 398 (8 February 1993)

Grand Slam singles results
- Australian Open: Q1 (1992, 1993, 1994)

Doubles
- Highest ranking: No. 237 (29 November 1993)

Grand Slam doubles results
- Australian Open: 1R (1993, 1994)

Maija Avotins (born 10 April 1975) is a former professional tennis player from Australia.

== Biography ==
Avotins attended the Australian Institute of Sport on a scholarship from Melbourne in the early 1990s. She had a successful career in the juniors, most notably winning the girls' doubles title at the 1992 Wimbledon Championships, partnering Lisa McShea. On the professional circuit she featured as a wildcard in the women's doubles at both the 1993 Australian Open and 1994 Australian Open.

== ITF Finals ==
=== Doubles finals 8: (1-7) ===
$100,000 tournaments
$75,000 tournaments
$50,000 tournaments
$25,000 tournaments
$10,000 tournaments

Result	No	Date	Tournament	Surface	Partner	Opponents	Score
Loss	1.	12 February 1990	Adelaide, Australia	Hard	(Australia) Joanne Limmer	(Australia) Catherine Barclay (Australia) Kerry-Anne Guse	0–6, 0–6
Loss	2.	15 March 1993	Canberra, Australia	Grass	(Australia) Robyn Mawdsley	(Australia) Kate McDonald (Australia) Jane Taylor	w/o
Loss	3.	22 March 1993	Newcastle, Australia	Grass	(Australia) Esther Knox	(Australia) Kate McDonald (Australia) Jane Taylor	3–6, 1–6
Loss	4.	28 June 1993	Velp, Netherlands	Clay	(Australia) Lisa McShea	(Czech Republic) Martina Hautová (Czech Republic) Lenka Němečková	5–7, 5–7
Loss	5.	12 July 1993	Frinton, United Kingdom	Grass	(Australia) Lisa McShea	(Russia) Natalia Egorova (Russia) Svetlana Parkhomenko	6–4, 2–6, 6–7
Loss	6.	2 August 1993	Norfolk, United States	Hard	(Australia) Lisa McShea	(United States) Varalee Sureephong (Canada) Vanessa Webb	6–7, 4–6
Loss	7.	10 October 1993	Ibaraki, Japan	Hard (i)	(Australia) Lisa McShea	(Japan) Hiroko Mochizuki (Japan) Yuka Tanaka	6–4, 3–6, 6–7
Win	8.	31 October 1993	Kyoto, Japan	Hard	(Australia) Lisa McShea	(Japan) Mana Endo (Japan) Masako Yanagi	7–6^{(5)}, 7–5
