= WTA Sapporo =

Sapporo Ladies Open

Defunct tennis tournament
- Event name: Sapporo Ladies Open
- Tour: WTA Tier IV
- Founded: 1993
- Abolished: 1993
- Location: Sapporo, Japan
- Surface: Carpet

The WTA Sapporo was a defunct tennis tournament on the WTA Tour that was held just once, in 1993. It was held in Sapporo, Japan from September 27 to October 3 and was a Tier IV event. The official name of the tournament was the Sapporo Ladies Open.

== Past finals ==
=== Singles ===
Year	Champions	Runners-up	Score
1993	(United States) Linda Harvey-Wild	(Romania) Irina Spîrlea	6–4, 6–3

=== Doubles ===
Year	Champions	Runners-up	Score
1993	(Indonesia) Yayuk Basuki (Japan) Nana Miyagi	(Japan) Yone Kamio (Japan) Naoko Kijimuta	6–4, 6-2

== See also ==
- List of tennis tournaments
