= Miki Mizokuchi =

Japanese tennis player (born 1965)

- Country (sports): Japan
- Born: 13 May 1965 (age 60); Ōta, Tokyo, Japan
- Prize money: $54,995

Singles
- Career record: 77–76
- Career titles: 2 ITF
- Highest ranking: No. 221 (4 July 1988)

Grand Slam singles results
- Australian Open: Q3 (1990)
- French Open: Q1 (1988)
- Wimbledon: Q2 (1988)

Doubles
- Career record: 40–53
- Career titles: 1 ITF
- Highest ranking: No. 199 (4 July 1988)

Grand Slam doubles results
- Australian Open: 1R (1990)

Miki Mizokuchi (born 13 May 1965) is a Japanese former professional tennis player.

Born in Tokyo, Mizokuchi began competing professionally in 1985 and reached her career best singles ranking of 221 in the world in 1988. Her best WTA Tour performance was a second round appearance at the 1988 Taipei Women's Championships.

Mizokuchi featured in the women's doubles main draw of the 1990 Australian Open, partnering Kazuko Ito.

== ITF finals ==
=== Singles: 4 (2–2) ===
Outcome	No.	Date	Tournament	Surface	Opponent	Score
Runner-up	1.	25 October 1987	Ibaraki, Japan	Hard	(Japan) Maya Kidowaki	4–6, 1–6
Winner	1.	15 November 1987	Kyoto, Japan	Hard	(United States) Jennifer Fuchs	6–0, 4–6, 6–1
Winner	2.	11 October 1992	Tokyo, Japan	Hard	(Japan) Masako Yanagi	7–5, 1–6, 6–1
Runner-up	2.	25 October 1992	Kyoto, Japan	Hard	(Japan) Masako Yanagi	2–6, 4–6

=== Doubles: 4 (1–3) ===
Outcome	No.	Date	Tournament	Surface	Partner	Opponents	Score
Runner-up	1.	16 October 1989	Kuroshio, Japan	Hard	(Japan) Ayako Hirose	(United States) Lynn Nabors (Mexico) Lupita Novelo	6–7^{(5)}, 4–6
Runner-up	2.	13 November 1989	Kyoto, Japan	Hard	(Japan) Ayako Hirose	(Japan) Emiko Sakaguchi (Japan) Naoko Sato	6–1, 2–6, 1–6
Runner-up	3.	17 June 1990	Largo, U.S.	Clay	(Japan) Shiho Okada	(United States) Nicole Arendt (United States) Kay Louthian	2–6, 4–6
Winner	1.	30 September 1991	Hokkaido, Japan	Hard	(Japan) Yukie Koizumi	(China) Tang Min (China) Li Fang	6–1, 3–6, 6–3
