= 1994 Nichirei International Championships =

- Date: 20–25 September
- Edition: 5th
- Category: Tier II
- Draw: 32S / 16D
- Prize money: $400,000
- Surface: Hard / outdoor
- Location: Tokyo, Japan
- Venue: Ariake Coliseum

Champions

Singles
- (Spain) Arantxa Sánchez Vicario

Doubles
- (France) Julie Halard (Spain) Arantxa Sánchez Vicario
← 1993 ·	Nichirei International Championships	· 1995 →

The 1994 Nichirei International Championships was a women's tennis tournament played on outdoor hard courts at the Ariake Coliseum in Tokyo, Japan that was part of Tier II of the 1994 WTA Tour. It was the fifth edition of the tournament and was held from 20 September through 25 September 1994. First-seeded Arantxa Sánchez Vicario won the singles title and earned $80,000 first-prize money.

== Finals ==
=== Singles ===
(Spain) Arantxa Sánchez Vicario defeated (United States) Amy Frazier 6–1, 6–2

- It was Sánchez Vicario' 7th singles title of the year and the 19th of her career.

=== Doubles ===
(France) Julie Halard / (Spain) Arantxa Sánchez Vicario defeated (United States) Amy Frazier / (Japan) Rika Hiraki 6–1, 0–6, 6–1
