= Ayako Hirose =

Japanese tennis player (born 1969)

- Country (sports): Japan
- Born: 21 January 1969 (age 56)
- Prize money: $61,320

Singles
- Career record: 122–112
- Career titles: 1 ITF
- Highest ranking: No. 216 (19 July 1993)

Doubles
- Career record: 125–87
- Career titles: 3 ITF
- Highest ranking: No. 115 (12 July 1993)

Grand Slam doubles results
- Australian Open: 2R (1992)

Ayako Hirose (広瀬 綾子, Hirose Ayako, born 21 January 1969) is a Japanese former professional tennis player.

Hirose, who reached a best singles ranking of 216, qualified for the main draw of two WTA Tour tournaments, the 1993 Toray Pan Pacific Open and 1994 Nichirei International Championships.

In doubles, Hirose was ranked as high as 115 in the world and made the second round at the 1992 Australian Open.

== ITF finals ==
$25,000 tournaments
$10,000 tournaments

=== Singles: 2 (1–1) ===
Outcome	No.	Date	Tournament	Surface	Opponent	Score
Runner-up	1.	30 October 1989	Saga, Japan	Grass	(Japan) Ei Iida	1–6, 6–7^{(6)}
Winner	1.	9 May 1994	Bandar Seri Begawan, Brunei	Hard	(Indonesia) Irawati Iskandar	6–4, 6–1

=== Doubles: 8 (3–5) ===
Outcome	No.	Date	Tournament	Surface	Partner	Opponents	Score
Runner-up	1.	17 October 1988	Kuroshio, Japan	Hard	(Japan) Shiho Okada	(Japan) Kazuko Ito (Japan) Yasuyo Kajita	5–7, 4–6
Runner-up	2.	16 October 1989	Kuroshio, Japan	Hard	(Japan) Miki Mizokuchi	(United States) Lynn Nabors (Mexico) Lupita Novelo	6–7^{(5)}, 4–6
Runner-up	3.	13 November 1989	Kyoto, Japan	Hard	(Japan) Miki Mizokuchi	(Japan) Emiko Sakaguchi (Japan) Naoko Sato	6–1, 2–6, 1–6
Winner	1.	19 February 1990	Melbourne, Australia	Hard	(Japan) Yuko Hosoki	(Australia) Danielle Jones (Australia) Sharon McNamara	6–3, 6–2
Runner-up	4.	5 March 1990	Newcastle, Australia	Grass	(Japan) Yuko Hosoki	(Australia) Kirrily Sharpe (Australia) Angie Woolcock	6–3, 5–7, 4–6
Winner	2.	15 July 1991	Evansville, United States	Hard	(Japan) Ei Iida	(United States) Kathy Foxworth (United States) Shannan McCarthy	6–3, 2–6, 6–4
Runner-up	5.	4 November 1991	Chiba, Japan	Hard	(Japan) Yone Kamio	(Mexico) Lupita Novelo (Australia) Kristine Kunce	4–6, 7–5, 4–6
Winner	3.	26 October 1992	Saga, Japan	Clay	(Japan) Masako Yanagi	(Czechoslovakia) Katarína Studeníková (Czechoslovakia) Eva Martincová	6–2, 6–0
