= Yuka Tanaka =

Japanese tennis player (born 1974)

- Country (sports): Japan
- Born: 21 August 1974 (age 50)
- Prize money: $43,171

Singles
- Career record: 66–71
- Career titles: 1 ITF
- Highest ranking: No. 319 (29 November 1993)

Doubles
- Career record: 80–47
- Career titles: 8 ITF
- Highest ranking: No. 159 (10 April 1995)

Yuka Tanaka (born 21 August 1974) is a Japanese former professional tennis player.

Tanaka competed on the professional tour in the 1990s, reaching a best singles ranking of 319. She featured in the main draw of the 1994 Nichirei International Championships, a WTA Tour tournament in Tokyo, then won an ITF title in Italy in 1995. As a doubles player, she was ranked as high as 159 in the world and appeared more regularly on the WTA Tour.

== ITF Circuit finals ==
$25,000 tournaments
$10,000 tournaments

=== Singles: 2 (1–1) ===
| Result | No. | Date | Tournament | Surface | Opponent | Score |
|---|---|---|---|---|---|---|
| Loss | 1. | 18 October 1993 | ITF Kugayama, Japan | Hard | (Japan) Mami Donoshiro | 6–4, 3–6, 1–6 |
| Win | 1. | 28 August 1995 | ITF Marina di Massa, Italy | Clay | (Italy) Monica Guglielmi | 1–6, 6–3, 6–2 |

=== Doubles: 15 (8–7) ===
| Result | No. | Date | Tournament | Surface | Partner | Opponents | Score |
|---|---|---|---|---|---|---|---|
| Win | 1. | 8 July 1991 | ITF Dublin, Ireland | Clay | (Japan) Shizuka Tokiwa | (Australia) Juliet Drew (Australia) Julie Welsh | 6–2, 6–4 |
| Loss | 1. | 5 October 1992 | ITF Kuroshio, Japan | Hard | (Japan) Mami Donoshiro | (Japan) Yuko Hosoki (Japan) Naoko Kijimuta | 2–6, 4–6 |
| Win | 2. | 10 October 1993 | ITF Ibaraki, Japan | Hard | (Japan) Hiroko Mochizuki | (Australia) Maija Avotins (Australia) Lisa McShea | 4–6, 6–3, 7–6 |
| Win | 3. | 18 October 1993 | ITF Kugayama, Japan | Hard | (Japan) Mami Donoshiro | (Japan) Mana Endo (Japan) Masako Yanagi | 6–3, 6–3 |
| Win | 4. | 20 June 1994 | ITF Valladolid, Spain | Clay | (Japan) Hiroko Mochizuki | (Netherlands) Hanneke Ketelaars (Czech Republic) Lenka Němečková | 6–0, 4–6, 6–2 |
| Win | 5. | 10 October 1994 | ITF Kuroshio, Japan | Hard | (South Korea) Kim Il-soon | (South Korea) Park In-sook (Japan) Yoshiko Sasano | 6–1, 6–1 |
| Loss | 2. | 31 October 1994 | ITF Saga, Japan | Grass | (Japan) Mami Donoshiro | (Japan) Ei Iida (Australia) Louise Pleming | 3–6, 6–7^{(2)} |
| Loss | 3. | 14 November 1994 | ITF Buenos Aires, Argentina | Clay | (Slovakia) Patrícia Marková | (Argentina) Laura Montalvo (Argentina) Mercedes Paz | 4–6, 3–6 |
| Loss | 4. | 21 November 1994 | ITF La Plata, Argentina | Clay | (Slovakia) Patrícia Marková | (Hungary) Virág Csurgó (Hungary) Petra Mandula | 6–7, 5–7 |
| Loss | 5. | 6 May 1996 | ITF Seoul, South Korea | Clay | (Japan) Yuko Hosoki | (Australia) Catherine Barclay-Reitz (Thailand) Kerry-Anne Guse | 6–4, 0–6, 3–6 |
| Win | 6. | 3 June 1996 | ITF Taichung, Taiwan | Hard | (Japan) Shinobu Asagoe | (Japan) Tomoe Hotta (Japan) Sachie Umehara | 6–0, 6–1 |
| Win | 7. | 30 September 1996 | ITF Ibaraki 1, Japan | Hard | (Japan) Keiko Nagatomi | (Japan) Keiko Ishida (Japan) Kiyoko Yazawa | 3–6, 6–3, 7–5 |
| Loss | 6. | 7 October 1996 | ITF Ibaraki 2, Japan | Hard | (Japan) Keiko Nagatomi | (Australia) Gail Biggs (Australia) Lisa McShea | 7–5, 3–6, 3–6 |
| Win | 8. | 21 October 1996 | ITF Kyoto, Japan | Carpet | (Japan) Keiko Nagatomi | (Australia) Gail Biggs (Australia) Lisa McShea | 7–6^{(4)}, 2–6, 6–2 |
| Loss | 7. | 28 October 1996 | ITF Saga, Japan | Grass | (Japan) Hiroko Mochizuki | (Australia) Danielle Jones (Thailand) Tamarine Tanasugarn | 2–6, 3–6 |
