= Mana Endo =

Japanese tennis player (born 1971)

Mana Endo 遠藤 愛
- Country (sports): Japan
- Residence: Fukuyama City, Japan
- Born: 6 February 1971 (age 55) Hiroshima, Japan
- Turned pro: 1991
- Retired: 1998
- Plays: Right-handed
- Prize money: $463,765

Singles
- Career record: 144–108
- Career titles: 1 WTA, 4 ITF
- Highest ranking: No. 26 (26 September 1994)

Grand Slam singles results
- Australian Open: 3R (1996)
- French Open: 3R (1992)
- Wimbledon: 3R (1992, 1994)
- US Open: 4R (1994)

Doubles
- Career record: 25–42
- Career titles: 0
- Highest ranking: No. 98 (30 January 1995)

Grand Slam doubles results
- Australian Open: 3R (1995)
Medal record
Representing Japan
Summer Universiade
Gold medal – first place	1991 Sheffield	Singles
Gold medal – first place	1991 Sheffield	Doubles
Asian Games
Gold medal – first place	1994 Hiroshima	Team
Bronze medal – third place	1994 Hiroshima	Doubles

Mana Endo (遠藤 愛, Endō Mana) is a Japanese former professional tennis player. She was born on February 6, 1971, in Hiroshima and resides in Fukuyama, Hiroshima.

She started playing tennis at age seven with her father and coach Hiroshi and played on the WTA Tour from 1991 until 1998. She graduated from the University of Tsukuba while on the tour in March 1993.

== Career highlights ==
- Her career-high ranking was 26th worldwide in singles (1994), and 98th in doubles (1995)
- She played 22 Grand Slam tournaments in singles with her best result being the round of 16 at the 1994 US Open. That tournament marked the first time two Japanese women reached the fourth round of a Grand Slam (Kimiko Date was the other player).
- Her career record is 144–108. She won a singles title in Hobart in 1994, defeating Lindsay Davenport during that tournament.
- Her biggest upset over a seeded player came at the 1996 Australian Open when she defeated the fifth seed Kimiko Date in the second round.

== WTA career finals ==
=== Singles: 2 (1 title, 1 runner-up) ===
Legend
Tier I	0
Tier II	0
Tier III	0
Tier IV & V	1

Result	No.	Date	Tournament	Surface	Opponent	Score
Win	1.	15 January 1994	Hobart International, Australia	Hard	(Australia) Rachel McQuillan	6–1, 6–7, 6–4
Loss	2.	14 January 1996	Hobart International, Australia	Hard	(France) Julie Halard-Decugis	1–6, 2–6

== ITF finals ==
=== Singles (4–0) ===
Result	No.	Date	Tournament	Tier	Surface	Opponent	Score
Win	1.	12 November 1989	Matsuyama, Japan	10,000	Hard	(Japan) Yone Kamio	6–2, 6–4
Win	2.	30 September 1990	Kuroshio, Japan	10,000	Hard	(Japan) Yone Kamio	6–2, 6–1
Win	3.	28 October 1990	Nagasaki, Japan	25,000	Hard	(Japan) Yone Kamio	0–6, 6–3, 6–2
Win	4.	10 November 1991	Kofu, Japan	25,000	Hard	(Chinese Taipei) Wang Shi-ting	6–4, 6–0

=== Doubles (0–3) ===
Result	No.	Date	Tournament	Tier	Surface	Partner	Opponents	Score
Loss	1.	18 October 1993	ITF Kugayama, Japan	10,000	Hard	(Japan) Masako Yanagi	(Japan) Mami Donoshiro (Japan) Yuka Tanaka	3–6, 3–6
Loss	2.	31 October 1993	ITF Kyoto, Japan	10,000	Hard	(Japan) Masako Yanagi	(Australia) Maija Avotins (Australia) Lisa McShea	6–7^{(5)}, 5–7
Loss	3.	7 November 1993	ITF Saga, Japan	25,000	Grass	(Japan) Naoko Sawamatsu	(Japan) Ei Iida (Japan) Maya Kidowaki	2–6, 6–3, 2–6
