= Amy Frazier =

American tennis player

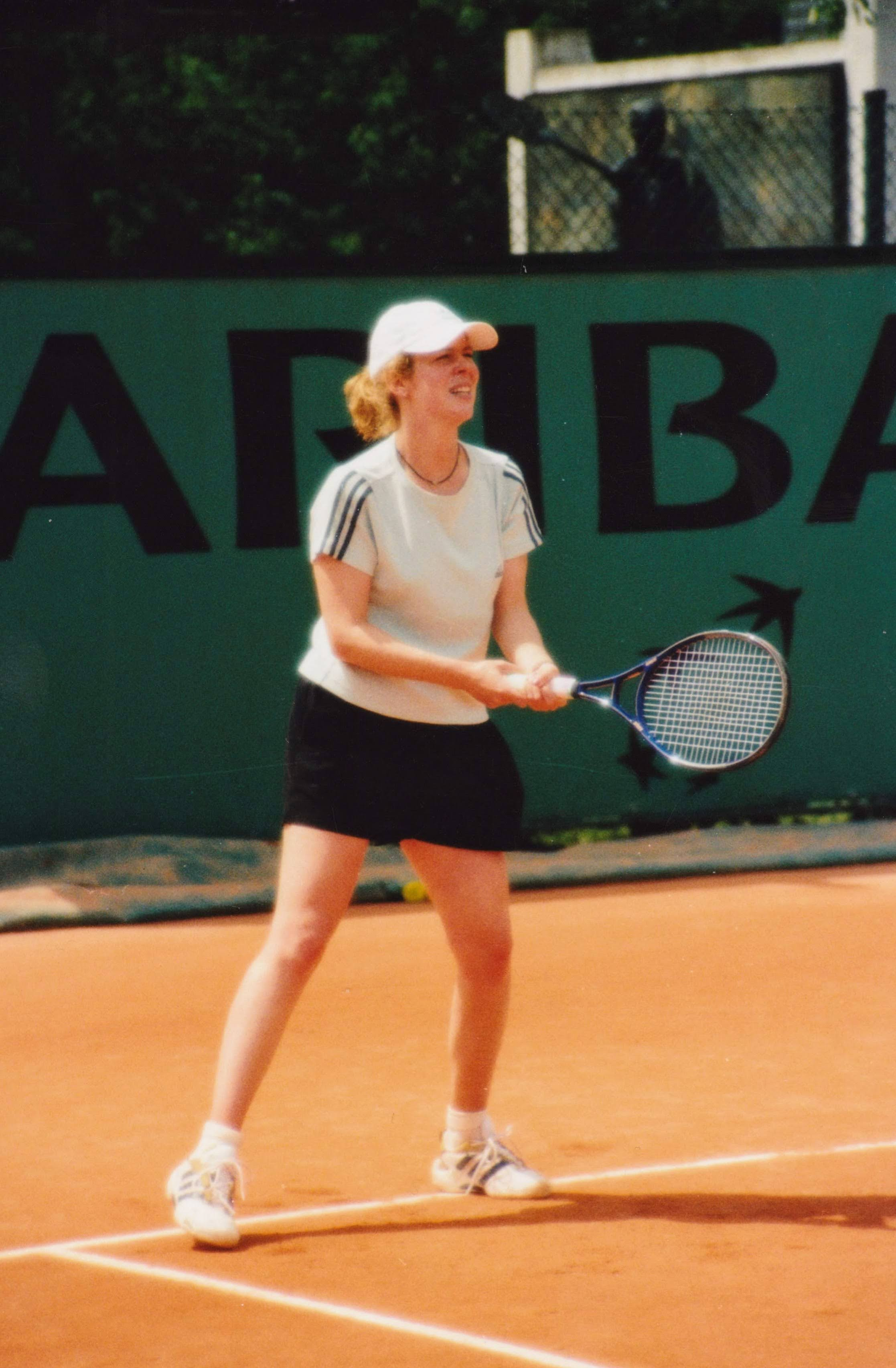
- Frazier preparing to return serve ahead of the French Open, 2000.
- Country (sports): United States
- Born: September 19, 1972 (age 54) St. Louis, Missouri, US
- Height: 1.75 m (5 ft 9 in)
- Turned pro: 1986
- Retired: 2006
- Plays: Right-handed (two-handed backhand)
- Prize money: $3,460,799

Singles
- Career record: 497–335
- Career titles: 8 WTA, 4 ITF
- Highest ranking: No. 13 (February 27, 1995)

Grand Slam singles results
- Australian Open: QF (1992)
- French Open: 3R (1995, 2001)
- Wimbledon: 4R (1991, 1992, 1996, 2004)
- US Open: QF (1995)

Doubles
- Career record: 200–225
- Career titles: 4 WTA, 5 ITF
- Highest ranking: No. 24 (March 29, 1993)

Grand Slam doubles results
- Australian Open: 2R (1989–90, 1993, 1996–97, 2001–02, 2006)
- French Open: 3R (1995)
- Wimbledon: QF (1995)
- US Open: QF (1998)

Team competitions
- Fed Cup: 2–0 (Sin. 2–0, Dbs. 0–0)

Amy Frazier (born September 19, 1972) is a former professional tennis player from the United States. She won eight singles and four doubles titles on the WTA Tour. On February 27, 1995, she achieved a career-high singles ranking of No. 13, while on March 29, 1993, she achieved a career-high doubles ranking of No. 24.

== Biography ==
=== Junior career ===
As a junior, she won US national titles in every age division, and she finished with 11 top 10 rankings, during a 6-year period in the 1980s. She captured 7 US national singles titles and 5 national doubles titles, while her junior Grand Slam record was 12–6 in singles.

=== Active career ===
Frazier made her first appearance in four tour qualifying events in 1986 and debuted in the main draw in 1987, including at the 1987 US Open, where she lost to Catarina Lindqvist in the first round. Frazier was an active professional until the 2006 US Open, where she made her 20th consecutive singles appearance, setting a standalone Open Era record for the most consecutive appearances in the US Open women's draw.

She also appeared in 18 Australian Open, 18 Wimbledon, and 15 French Open tournaments for an all-time record of 71 Grand Slam appearances, until compatriot Venus Williams surpassed this record at the 2016 US Open. She qualified two times for the WTA Finals, first time in 1992 and then in 2000.

Her best showing is a pair of quarterfinal appearances at the 1992 Australian Open and 1995 US Open. She lost 30 times in the first round of her Grand Slam matches, 18 times in the second round, 15 times in the third round, six times in the fourth round, and both of her quarterfinal matches. Her all-time Grand Slam record is 73–71. She was also a member of the United States Fed Cup team.

Frazier has 27 wins against top-10 players, spent total 265 weeks inside the top 20, 18 consecutive years in the top 100 and 17 straight seasons inside the Top 40 which is the longest ever continuous span by any male or female tennis player who hasn't reached top 10.

Frazier has the distinction of being the last woman to play against Steffi Graf in a WTA Tour match at the 1999 TIG Tennis Classic, played at the La Costa Resort and Spa outside San Diego. Graf suffered the hamstring injury during the second set requiring a medical timeout to tape her thigh. She then retired mid-match in the third set, an event that would ultimately serve as the conclusion to her professional career. After the match, Frazier stated: "To compare myself in any way to Steffi is not in the realm of reality. I don’t really consider it winning, to be up 2-1 in the third. Steffi retired from the match. To say I won, that wouldn’t be correct." She added that it was "just an honor to be out there competing against her."

Frazier won eight career singles titles and was a finalist seven times. She also won four career doubles titles and was a finalist nine times. Being a flat-hitter, she excelled on hard courts and was the most successful on the summer hard-court events in California and appeared in eight finals in two different events in Japan.

=== Retirement ===
Frazier played her last professional tour match at the 2006 US Open. She never officially announced her retirement.

After leaving the WTA Tour, she continued to be actively involved in tennis taking up a coaching role at the Franklin Athletic Club, Michigan (her local tennis club where she was first introduced to the sport at three years of age).

=== USTA National W40 Hardcourt champion (seniors' circuit) ===
In December 2015, Frazier won the USTA National W40 Hardcourt Championships at La Jolla, California. At 43, it was her first and her last USTA National Senior tournament since leaving the pro tour.

=== USTA Midwest Hall of Fame induction ===
In February 2019, she was inducted into the USTA Midwest Hall of Fame.

== Personal life ==
Frazier is married and has a daughter.

== WTA career finals ==
=== Singles: 15 (8–7) ===
Legend
Tier I (0/0)
Tier II (1/2)
Tier III (4/4)
Tier IV & V (2/1)
Virginia Slims (1/0)

Result	W/L	Date	Tournament	Surface	Opponent	Score
Win	1–0	Feb 1989	Kansas, Wichita	Hard (i)	(United States) Barbara Potter	4–6, 6–4, 6–0
Win	2–0	Feb 1990	Oklahoma City, US	Hard (i)	(Netherlands) Manon Bollegraf	6–4, 6–2
Loss	2–1	Sep 1990	Tokyo, Japan	Carpet (i)	(United States) Mary Joe Fernández	3–6, 6–2, 6–3
Win	3–1	May 1992	Lucerne, Switzerland	Clay	(Slovakia) Radka Zrubáková	4–6, 6–4, 7–5
Loss	3–2	Apr 1994	Tokyo, Japan	Hard	(Japan) Kimiko Date	7–5, 6–0
Win	4–2	Aug 1994	Los Angeles, US	Hard	(United States) Ann Grossman	6–1, 6–3
Loss	4–3	Sep 1994	Tokyo, Japan	Hard (i)	(Spain) Arantxa Sánchez Vicario	6–1, 6–2
Win	5–3	Apr 1995	Tokyo, Japan	Hard	(Japan) Kimiko Date	7–6^{(7–5)}, 7–5
Loss	5–4	Apr 1996	Tokyo, Japan	Hard	(Japan) Kimiko Date	6–4, 7–5
Loss	5–5	Apr 1997	Tokyo, Japan	Hard	(Japan) Ai Sugiyama	4–6, 6–4, 6–4
Win	6–5	Apr 1999	Tokyo, Japan	Hard	(Japan) Ai Sugiyama	6–2, 6–2
Loss	6–6	Oct 2000	Tokyo, Japan	Hard	(France) Julie Halard-Decugis	5–7, 7–5, 6–4
Loss	6–7	Jan 2003	Hobart, Australia	Hard	(Australia) Alicia Molik	6–2, 4–6, 6–4
Win	7–7	Jan 2004	Hobart, Australia	Hard	(Japan) Shinobu Asagoe	6–3, 6–3
Win	8–7	Nov 2005	Quebec City, Canada	Hard (i)	(Sweden) Sofia Arvidsson	6–1, 7–5

=== Doubles: 13 (4–9) ===
Legend
Tier I (0/0)
Tier II (0/5)
Tier III (1/3)
Tier IV & V (3/1)
Virginia Slims (0/0)

Result	No.	Date	Tournament	Surface	Partner	Opponents	Score
Loss	1.	Oct 1990	Puerto Rico Open	Hard	(Australia) Julie Richardson	(Soviet Union) Elena Brioukhovets (Soviet Union) Natalia Medvedeva	6–4, 6–2
Win	1.	Apr 1991	Japan Open Championships	Hard	(Japan) Maya Kidowaki	(Japan) Yone Kamio (Japan) Akiko Kijimuta	6–2, 6–4
Win	2.	Apr 1992	Japan Open Championships	Hard	(Japan) Rika Hiraki	(Japan) Kimiko Date (United States) Stephanie Rehe	5–7, 7–6^{(7–5)}, 6–0
Win	3.	May 1992	Swiss Open	Clay	(South Africa) Elna Reinach	(Czech Republic) Karina Habšudová (United States) Marianne Werdel	7–5, 6–2
Loss	2.	Feb 1993	Chicago Cup, United States	Carpet (i)	(United States) Kimberly Po	(United States) Katrina Adams (United States) Zina Garrison-Jackson	7–6^{(9–7)}, 6–3
Loss	3.	Sep 1994	International Championships, Tokyo	Hard (i)	(Japan) Rika Hiraki	(Spain) Arantxa Sánchez Vicario (France) Julie Halard-Decugis	6–1, 0–6, 6–1
Loss	4.	Apr 1996	Japan Open Championships	Hard	(United States) Kimberly Po	(Japan) Kimiko Date (Japan) Ai Sugiyama	7–6^{(8–6)}, 6–7^{(6–8)}, 6–3
Loss	5.	Aug 1996	Los Angeles Classic, United States	Hard	(United States) Kimberly Po	(United States) Lindsay Davenport (Belarus) Natasha Zvereva	6–1, 6–4
Loss	6.	Oct 1996	Tournoi de Québec, Canada	Carpet (i)	(United States) Kimberly Po	(United States) Debbie Graham (Netherlands) Brenda Schultz-McCarthy	6–1, 6–4
Loss	7.	Aug 1997	San Diego Open, United States	Hard	(United States) Kimberly Po	(Switzerland) Martina Hingis (Spain) Arantxa Sánchez Vicario	6–3, 7–5
Loss	8.	Apr 1998	Japan Open Championships	Hard	(United States) Kimberly Po	(Japan) Nana Miyagi (Japan) Naoko Kijimuta	6–3, 4–6, 6–4
Win	4.	Nov 1999	Tournoi de Québec, Canada	Carpet (i)	(United States) Katie Schlukebir	(United States) Debbie Graham (Zimbabwe) Cara Black	6–2, 6–3
Loss	9.	Jul 2000	Stanford Classic, United States	Hard	(Zimbabwe) Cara Black	(United States) Chanda Rubin (France) Sandrine Testud	6–4, 6–4

== Grand Slam performance timeline ==
Key
W	F	SF	QF	#R	RR	Q#	DNQ	A	NH

(W) winner; (F) finalist; (SF) semifinalist; (QF) quarterfinalist; (#R) rounds 4, 3, 2, 1; (RR) round-robin stage; (Q#) qualification round; (DNQ) did not qualify; (A) absent; (NH) not held; (SR) strike rate (events won / competed); (W–L) win–loss record.

=== Singles ===
Tournament	1990	1991	1992	1993	1994	1995	1996	1997	1998	1999	2000	2001	2002	2003	2004	2005	2006	W–L
Grand Slam tournaments
Australian Open	1R	4R	QF	1R	3R	3R	1R	1R	A	2R	1R	2R	2R	2R	3R	3R	1R	19–16
French Open	A	A	2R	A	1R	3R	1R	2R	A	2R	1R	3R	2R	1R	1R	2R	1R	9–13
Wimbledon	3R	4R	4R	A	1R	2R	4R	2R	1R	1R	3R	3R	1R	2R	4R	1R	3R	23–16
US Open	1R	2R	1R	2R	2R	QF	2R	1R	1R	3R	1R	1R	4R	3R	3R	2R	1R	18–17
Win–loss	2–3	7–3	8–4	1–2	3–4	9–4	4–4	2–4	0–2	4–4	2–4	5–4	5–4	4–4	7–4	4–4	2–4	69–62

== Records against top ranked players ==
Frazier has had some success against top-ranked opponents. Her records against players who reached the top 10 during their careers are as follows:

- Justine Henin 2–1
- Arantxa Sánchez Vicario 4–3
- Mary Pierce 4–3
- Pam Shriver 4–1
- Anke Huber 6–2
- Barbara Schett 4–2
- Ai Sugiyama 4–1
- Patty Schnyder 3–2
- Nicole Vaidisova 1–0
- Kathy Rinaldi 2–0
- Paola Suárez 2–0
- Dominique Van Roost 2–0
- Barbara Paulus 1–0
- Mary Joe Fernandez 1–1
- Iva Majoli 1–1
- Natasha Zvereva 1–1
- Ana Ivanovic 1–1
- Nathalie Tauziat 4–4
- Katerina Maleeva 3–3
- Magdalena Maleeva 1–1
- Conchita Martínez 4–8
- Gabriela Sabatini 2–3
- Manuela Maleeva 2–4
- Alicia Molik 2–3
- Martina Navratilova 1–2
- Anastasia Myskina 1–2
- Marion Bartoli 1–2
- Daniela Hantuchová 1–2
- Steffi Graf 1–6
- Monica Seles 1–9
- Martina Hingis 1–6
- Jennifer Capriati 0–6
- Jelena Janković 0–2
- Lindsay Davenport 0–10
- Serena Williams 0–3
- Venus Williams 0–5
- Maria Sharapova 0–3
- Helena Sukova 0–3
- Kim Clijsters 0–2
