= Yone Kamio =

Japanese tennis player (born 1971)

- Country (sports): Japan
- Born: 22 November 1971 (age 54) Yokohama, Japan
- Retired: 1996
- Plays: Right-handed
- Prize money: $356,441

Singles
- Career record: 142–106
- Career titles: 1 ITF
- Highest ranking: No. 24 (16 October 1995)

Grand Slam singles results
- Australian Open: 3R (1995)
- French Open: 1R (1994-1996)
- Wimbledon: 3R (1995)
- US Open: 3R (1995)

Doubles
- Career record: 43–68
- Highest ranking: No. 65 (29 August 1994)

Grand Slam doubles results
- Australian Open: 2R (1992, 1994, 1995)
- French Open: 2R (1994)
- Wimbledon: 1R (1994, 1995)
- US Open: 2R (1995)

Yone Kamio (神尾 米, Kamio Yone; born November 22, 1971 in Yokohama) is a retired Japanese tennis player who competed on the WTA Tour. She attained a career-best ranking of #24 in the world in October 1995. That year, she reached the third round of the Australian Open, Wimbledon, and the U.S. Open.

== WTA finals ==
=== Doubles (0–2) ===
Result	W/L	Date	Tournament	Surface	Partner	Opponents	Score
Loss	0–1	Apr 1991	Tokyo, Japan	Hard	(Japan) Akiko Kijimuta	(United States) Amy Frazier (Japan) Maya Kidowaki	2–6, 4–6
Loss	0–2	Oct 1993	Sapporo, Japan	Carpet (i)	(Japan) Naoko Kijimuta	(Indonesia) Yayuk Basuki (Japan) Nana Smith	4–6, 2–6

== ITF finals ==
=== Singles (1–3) ===
Result	No.	Date	Tournament	Surface	Opponent	Score
Loss	1.	12 November 1989	Matsuyama, Japan	Hard	(Japan) Mana Endo	2–6, 4–6
Loss	2.	30 September 1990	Kuroshio, Japan	Hard	(Japan) Mana Endo	2–6, 1–6
Loss	3.	28 October 1990	Nagasaki, Japan	Hard	(Japan) Mana Endo	6–0, 3–6, 2–6
Win	4.	2 November 1992	Machida, Japan	Grass	(South Africa) Tessa Price	4–6, 7–6, 6–2

=== Doubles (0–3) ===
Result	No.	Date	Tournament	Surface	Partner	Opponents	Score
Loss	1.	16 June 1991	Mantua, Italy	Clay	(Japan) Hiromi Nagano	(Spain) Virginia Ruano Pascual (Austria) Marion Maruska	6–3, 4–6, 3–6
Loss	2.	4 November 1991	Chiba, Japan	Hard	(Japan) Ayako Hirose	(Mexico) Lupita Novelo (Australia) Kristine Kunce	4–6, 7–5, 4–6
Loss	3.	30 October 1994	Tarakan, Indonesia	Hard	(Japan) Naoko Kijimuta	(Australia) Catherine Barclay (Australia) Kerry-Anne Guse	2–6, 3–6
