= Naoko Kijimuta =

Japanese tennis player (born 1972)

Naoko Kijimuta 雉子牟田 直子
- Country (sports): Japan
- Born: March 26, 1972 (age 53) Ebina, Kanagawa
- Height: 1.64 m (5 ft 4 1/2 in)
- Turned pro: 1992
- Retired: 1998
- Prize money: $499,278

Singles
- Career record: 122–112
- Career titles: 0
- Highest ranking: No. 44 (March 3, 1997)

Grand Slam singles results
- Australian Open: 1R (1994, 1995, 1996, 1997, 1998)
- French Open: 2R (1997)
- Wimbledon: 3R (1997)
- US Open: 3R (1996)

Doubles
- Career record: 125–87
- Career titles: 5 WTA, 5 ITF
- Highest ranking: No. 18 (October 13, 1997)

Grand Slam doubles results
- Australian Open: QF (1997, 1998)
- French Open: 3R (1997)
- Wimbledon: 3R (1997, 1998)
- US Open: 3R (1997)

Naoko Kijimuta (Japanese: 雉子牟田 直子, Kijimuta Naoko, born March 26, 1972) is a retired tennis player and winner of five professional doubles tournaments. She has been a representative of Japan in the Federation Cup.

== Career ==
In the 1990s with her sister Akiko, she ranked among the top tennis players in Japan, alongside such players as Kimiko Date and Naoko Sawamatsu. From 1995 to 1997, she figured in the world top 100 in singles, taking a highest ranking in March 1997 - No. 44 (the season ended 1996 as the world's 50th best player).

Naoko's best results include the singles semifinals of the WTA Tour tournament in Jakarta (defeated by top-seeded Belgian Sabine Appelmans) and (Japan Open) in 1996, quarterfinals in Strasbourg in 1997, third rounds at the 1996 US Open and 1997 Wimbledon.

Greater successes she had in doubles, where she was ranked 18th in October 1997, and won five tournaments including WTA Tour events and another five lower-ranking (ITF Women's Circuit). All titles on the WTA Tour came with Japanese partners - Rika Hiraki, Miho Saeki and mostly with Nana Miyagi. Miyagi won three tournaments and twice was in the quarterfinal of a Grand Slam tournament (Australian Open 1997 and 1998).

Kijimuta and Miyagi also appeared in several semifinals and sometimes in the last eight of Grand Slam events (Wimbledon, French Open and US Open in 1997, as well as Wimbledon in 1998 - this time victory over the Williams sisters by default).

Naoko Kijimuta played doubles in the Federation Cup 1997 and 1998, partnering Nana Miyagi and Kyoko Nagatsuka, but lost all three games.

Her tennis career ended in September 1998, at the Toyota Princess Cup tournament in Tokyo, where she passed the qualifying in the singles to be defeated in the first round of the main draw by German Anke Huber in three sets. Also the first round of the tournament in doubles (along with Rika Hiraki) ended in defeat.

Her career earnings was almost half a million dollars.

== WTA career finals ==
=== Doubles: 6 (5 titles, 1 runner-up) ===
Result	W/L	Date	Tournament	Surface	Partner	Opponents	Score
Loss	0–1	Oct 1993	Sapporo Open, Japan	Carpet (i)	(Japan) Yone Kamio	(Indonesia) Yayuk Basuki (Japan) Nana Smith	4–6, 2–6
Win	1–1	Apr 1996	Jakarta Open, Indonesia	Hard	(Japan) Rika Hiraki	(Belgium) Laurence Courtois (Belgium) Nancy Feber	7–6, 7–5
Win	2–1	Oct 1996	China Open	Hard	(Japan) Miho Saeki	(Japan) Yuko Hosoki (Japan) Kazue Takuma	7–5, 6–4
Win	3–1	Jan 1997	Gold Coast Classic, Australia	Hard	(Japan) Nana Smith	(Romania) Ruxandra Dragomir (Italy) Silvia Farina	7–6, 6–1
Win	4–1	Jan 1997	Hobart International, Australia	Hard	(Japan) Nana Smith	(Germany) Barbara Rittner (Belgium) Dominique Van Roost	6–3, 6–1
Win	5–1	Apr 1998	Tokyo, Japan	Hard	(Japan) Nana Smith	(United States) Amy Frazier (Japan) Rika Hiraki	6–3, 4–6, 6–4

== ITF Circuit finals ==
$75,000 tournaments
$50,000 tournaments
$25,000 tournaments
$10,000 tournaments

=== Singles (0–1) ===
Result	No.	Date	Tournament	Surface	Opponent	Score
Loss	1.	23 September 1991	ITF Kuroshio, Japan	Hard	(China) Li Fang	3–6, 4–6

=== Doubles (5–3) ===
Result	No.	Date	Tournament	Surface	Partner	Opponents	Score
Win	1.	28 September 1992	ITF Ibaraki, Japan	Hard	(Japan) Yuko Hosoki	(Japan) Lisa McShea (United States) Amy deLone	6–3, 2–2 ret.
Win	2.	5 October 1992	ITF Kuroshio, Japan	Hard	(Japan) Yuko Hosoki	(Japan) Yuka Tanaka (Japan) Mami Donoshiro	6–2, 6–4
Win	3.	19 October 1992	ITF Kyoto, Japan	Hard	(Japan) Yuko Hosoki	(United States) Varalee Sureephong (Japan) Masako Yanagi	6–3, 6–3
Loss	4.	28 June 1993	ITF Columbia, United States	Hard	(Japan) Yuko Hosoki	(Japan) Keiko Nagatomi (Japan) Mika Todo	5–7, 4–6
Win	5.	5 July 1993	ITF Indianapolis, United States	Hard	(Japan) Yuko Hosoki	(Australia) Kate McDonald (United States) Stephanie Reece	7–5, 6–3
Win	6.	16 August 1993	ITF Arzachena, Italy	Clay	(Japan) Akiko Kijimuta	(Italy) Linda Ferrando (Italy) Silvia Farina Elia	6–0, 7–5
Loss	7.	30 October 1994	ITF Tarakan, Indonesia	Hard	(Japan) Yone Kamio	(Australia) Catherine Barclay (Australia) Kerry-Anne Guse	2–6, 3–6
Loss	8.	6 August 1995	ITF Austin, United States	Hard	(Japan) Yuka Yoshida	(United States) Shannan McCarthy (United States) Julie Steven	4–6, 3–6
