= Marianne Werdel =

American tennis player

- Country (sports): United States
- Born: October 17, 1967 (age 57); Los Angeles, California
- Height: 5 ft 10 in (1.78 m)
- Turned pro: 1986
- Plays: Right-handed (two-handed backhand)
- Prize money: US$1,044,641

Singles
- Career record: 237–227
- Career titles: 0
- Highest ranking: No. 21 (October 9, 1995)

Grand Slam singles results
- Australian Open: SF (1995)
- French Open: 2R (1989, 1994)
- Wimbledon: 3R (1991, 1993)
- US Open: 2R (1985, 1986, 1994, 1995)

Doubles
- Career record: 179–202
- Career titles: 0
- Highest ranking: No. 45 (May 25, 1992)

Marianne Werdel (born October 17, 1967) is an American former professional tennis player.

Werdel was born in Los Angeles and played on the WTA Tour from 1982 to 1997. She is also known as Marianne Witmeyer or Werdel-Witmeyer.

She won 19 national junior titles. In 1988 Werdel suffered a partially herniated disc, forcing a two-month absence from the tour.

At the 1995 Australian Open, unseeded Marianne Werdel defeated fifth-seeded Gabriela Sabatini of Argentina in a first-round match. Werdel won the first set, but Sabatini raced out to a 3–0 lead in the second set before twice losing her serve. Werdel won four consecutive games to close out the match in straight sets, dismissing Sabatini 6–4, 6–4. Werdel had also beaten Sabatini two years earlier at a tournament in Japan. After she had disposed of Sabatini, Werdel continued to work her way through the draw beating Park Sung-hee, Elena Makarova, Barbara Paulus and Angélica Gavaldón en route to a semifinal encounter with the top-seed and world No. 1 Arantxa Sánchez Vicario. In their two previous meetings, Werdel had lost both times to Sánchez Vicario. This time proved no different as Sánchez Vicario defeated Werdel in two sets. In reaching the semifinals, the 1995 Australian Open proved to be the best result Werdel would have in Grand Slam singles competition. She defeated Sánchez Vicario two months later in the third round of the Lipton Championships in Key Biscayne.

Werdel was coached by Woody Blocher.

On 21 November 1992, she married Major League Baseball player Ron Witmeyer.

== WTA career finals ==
Legend
Grand Slam
Tier I
Tier II
Tier III
Tier IV & V

=== Singles: 6 runner-ups ===
Result	W/L	Date	Tournament	Surface	Opponent	Score
Loss	0–1	Jul 1989	Schenectady, U.S.	Hard	(Peru) Laura Gildemeister	4–6, 3–6
Loss	0–2	Aug 1990	Schenectady, U.S.	Hard	(West Germany) Anke Huber	1–6, 7–5, 4–6
Loss	0–3	Oct 1990	Scottsdale, U.S.	Hard	(Spain) Conchita Martínez	5–7, 1–6
Loss	0–4	Apr 1993	Pattaya Open, Thailand	Hard	(Indonesia) Yayuk Basuki	3–6, 1–6
Loss	0–5	Sep 1993	Hong Kong Open	Hard	(Chinese Taipei) Wang Shi-ting	4–6, 6–3, 5–7
Loss	0–6	Jan 1997	Hobart, Australia	Hard	(Belgium) Dominique Van Roost	3–6, 3–6

=== Doubles: 6 runner-ups ===
Result	W/L	Date	Tournament	Surface	Partner	Opponents	Score
Loss	0–1	May 1992	Swiss Open	Clay	(Czechoslovakia) Karina Habšudová	(United States) Amy Frazier (South Africa) Elna Reinach	5–7, 2–6
Loss	0–2	May 1993	Swiss Open	Clay	(United States) Lindsay Davenport	(United States) Mary Joe Fernandez (Czech Republic) Helena Suková	2–6, 4–6
Loss	0–3	Sep 1993	Hong Kong Open, China	Hard	(United States) Debbie Graham	(Germany) Karin Kschwendt (Australia) Rachel McQuillan	6–4, 4–6, 2–6
Loss	0–4	Feb 1995	Chicago Cup, U.S.	Carpet (i)	(United States) Tami Whitlinger-Jones	(Argentina) Gabriela Sabatini (Netherlands) Brenda Schultz	7–5, 6–7, 4–6
Loss	0–5	May 1996	Strasbourg, France	Clay	(United States) Tami Whitlinger-Jones	(Indonesia) Yayuk Basuki (Australia) Nicole Bradtke	7–5, 4–6, 4–6
Loss	0–6	Feb 1997	Oklahoma Cup, U.S.	Hard	(United States) Tami Whitlinger-Jones	(Japan) Rika Hiraki (Japan) Nana Miyagi	4–6, 1–6
