= Nichirei International Championships =

Defunct tennis tournament
- Event name: Nichirei International Championships
- Tour: WTA Tour
- Founded: 1990
- Abolished: 1996
- Editions: 7
- Location: Tokyo, Japan
- Surface: Carpet (i) (1990); Hard (1991–96)

The Nichirei International Championships is a defunct WTA Tour affiliated tennis tournament played from 1990 to 1996. It was held in Tokyo in Japan and was played on indoor carpet courts in 1990 and on outdoor hardcourts from 1991 to 1996.

Monica Seles won the event a record three times, representing the Socialist Federal Republic of Yugoslavia in 1991, the Federal Republic of Yugoslavia in 1992, and the United States in 1996. Mary Joe Fernández garnered the most championships overall, with four of her five triumphs coming in the doubles competition.

The tournament was replaced by the Toyota Princess Cup.

== Prize money ==
Year	Prize money
1990–92	$350,000
1993	$375,000
1994	$400,000
1995	$430,000
1996	$450,000

== Finals ==
=== Singles ===
Year	Champion	Runner-up	Score
1990	(United States) Mary Joe Fernández	(United States) Amy Frazier	3–6, 6–2, 6–3
1991	(Socialist Federal Republic of Yugoslavia) Monica Seles	(United States) Mary Joe Fernández	6–1, 6–1
1992	(Federal Republic of Yugoslavia) Monica Seles	(Argentina) Gabriela Sabatini	6–2, 6–0
1993	(South Africa) Amanda Coetzer	(Japan) Kimiko Date	6–3, 6–2
1994	(Spain) Arantxa Sánchez Vicario	(United States) Amy Frazier	6–1, 6–2
1995	(France) Mary Pierce	(Spain) Arantxa Sánchez Vicario	6–3, 6–3
1996	(United States) Monica Seles	(Spain) Arantxa Sánchez Vicario	6–1, 6–4
1997	succeeded by Toyota Princess Cup		

=== Doubles ===
Year	Champions	Runners-up	Score
1990	(United States) Mary Joe Fernández (United States) Robin White	(United States) Gigi Fernández (United States) Martina Navratilova	4–6, 6–3, 7–6
1991	(United States) Mary Joe Fernández (United States) Pam Shriver	(United States) Carrie Cunningham (Peru) Laura Gildemeister	6–3, 6–3
1992	(United States) Mary Joe Fernández (United States) Robin White	(Indonesia) Yayuk Basuki (Japan) Nana Miyagi	6–4, 6–4
1993	(United States) Lisa Raymond (United States) Chanda Rubin	(South Africa) Amanda Coetzer (United States) Linda Wild	6–4, 6–1
1994	(France) Julie Halard (Spain) Arantxa Sánchez Vicario	(United States) Amy Frazier (Japan) Rika Hiraki	6–1, 0–6, 6–1
1995	(United States) Lindsay Davenport (United States) Mary Joe Fernández	(South Africa) Amanda Coetzer (United States) Linda Wild	6–3, 6–2
1996	(South Africa) Amanda Coetzer (France) Mary Pierce	(South Korea) Sung-Hee Park (Chinese Taipei) Shi-Ting Wang	6–1, 7–6
1997	succeeded by Toyota Princess Cup		
