= Helena Suková career statistics =

This is a list of the main career statistics of former Czech professional tennis player Helena Suková.

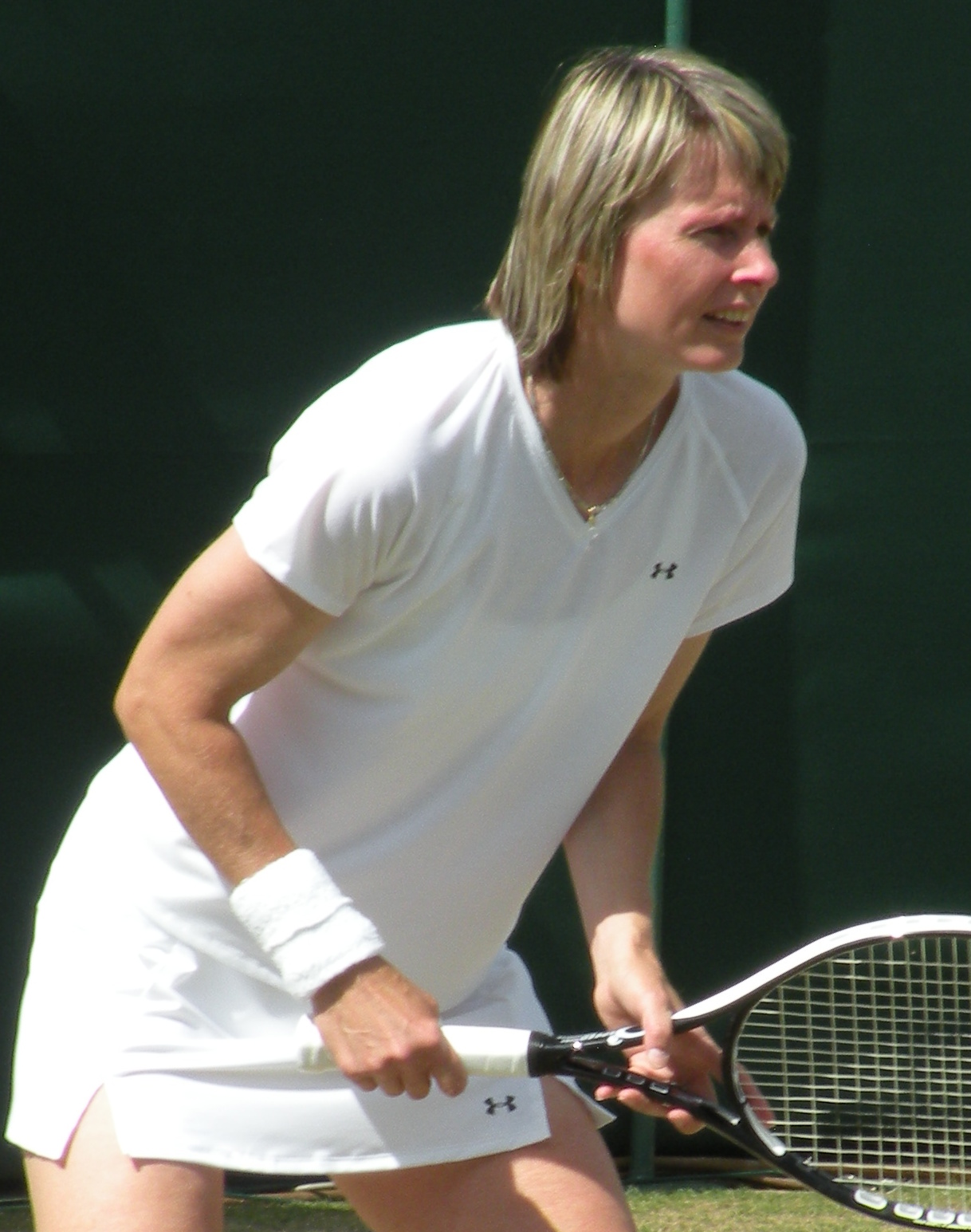
Suková at the 2008 Wimbledon Championships.

== Grand Slam performance timeline ==
Key
W	F	SF	QF	#R	RR	Q#	DNQ	A	NH

(W) winner; (F) finalist; (SF) semifinalist; (QF) quarterfinalist; (#R) rounds 4, 3, 2, 1; (RR) round-robin stage; (Q#) qualification round; (DNQ) did not qualify; (A) absent; (NH) not held; (SR) strike rate (events won / competed); (W–L) win–loss record.

=== Singles ===
Tournament	1981	1982	1983	1984	1985	1986	1987	1988	1989	1990	1991	1992	1993	1994	1995	1996	1997	1998	W–L
Australian Open	3R	1R	3R	F	QF	NH	4R	QF	F	SF	3R	3R	A	3R	2R	3R	1R	1R	38–16
French Open	A	2R	4R	1R	2R	SF	4R	QF	2R	A	2R	A	A	3R	1R	1R	2R	A	21–13
Wimbledon	A	1R	1R	4R	QF	QF	QF	QF	4R	4R	1R	3R	QF	4R	2R	2R	4R	1R	39–17
US Open	A	1R	3R	QF	QF	F	SF	4R	QF	4R	3R	4R	F	A	2R	3R	1R	A	45–15
Year-end ranking	74	25	16	7	9	5	7	8	8	14	17	12	17	22	29	27	80	NR	

=== Doubles ===
Tournament	1982	1983	1984	1985	1986	1987	1988	1989	1990	1991	1992	1993	1994	1995	1996	1997	1998	SR	W–L
Australian Open	2R	A	F	F	NH	SF	A	SF	W	3R	W	A	3R	QF	1R	SF	1R	2 / 13	39–11
French Open	3R	1R	3R	F	SF	SF	F	SF	W	SF	A	A	1R	1R	QF	QF	SF	1 / 15	46–14
Wimbledon	2R	3R	1R	SF	2R	W	A	W	W	QF	SF	QF	2R	QF	W	SF	QF	4 / 16	53–12
US Open	3R	A	1R	W	QF	QF	3R	3R	F	3R	SF	W	A	SF	SF	3R	A	2 / 14	45–12
Win–loss	6–4	2–2	6–4	19–3	8–3	16–3	7–2	16–3	23–1	11–4	14–2	9–1	3–3	10–4	13–3	13–4	7–3	9 / 58	183–49
Year-end championships
Tour Championships	A	A	A	F	F	F	SF	SF	QF	SF	W	SF	A	QF	QF	SF	A	1 / 12	14–1
Career statistics
Year-end ranking	—N/a	—N/a	8	3	3	6	4	2	1	8	1	2	23	9	6	10	42		

=== Mixed doubles ===
Tournament	1982	1983	1984	1985	1986	1987	1988	1989	1990	1991	1992	1993	1994	1995	1996	1997	1998	1999– 2005	2006	W–L
Australian Open	NH	NH	NH	NH	NH	A	A	A	A	1R	A	A	F	SF	QF	2R	F	A	A	14–6
French Open	A	A	A	QF	A	1R	A	3R	A	W	A	A	SF	2R	2R	SF	3R	A	A	16–8
Wimbledon	1R	A	A	QF	A	A	A	A	1R	3R	3R	1R	W	2R	W	W	1R	A	1R	25–9
US Open	2R	A	A	A	A	A	A	A	A	2R	F	W	A	A	QF	2R	A	A	A	14–5

== Significant finals ==
=== Grand Slams ===
==== Singles: 4 (4 runners-up) ====
Result	Year	Championship	Surface	Opponent	Score
Loss	1984	Australian Open	Grass	(United States) Chris Evert	7–6^{(7–4)}, 1–6, 3–6
Loss	1986	US Open	Hard	(United States) Martina Navratilova	3–6, 2–6
Loss	1989	Australian Open	Hard	(Germany) Steffi Graf	4–6, 4–6
Loss	1993	US Open	Hard	(Germany) Steffi Graf	3–6, 3–6

==== Doubles: 14 (9 titles, 5 runners-up) ====
Result	Year	Championship	Surface	Partner	Opponents	Score
Loss	1984	Australian Open	Grass	(West Germany) Claudia Kohde-Kilsch	(United States) Martina Navratilova (United States) Pam Shriver	3–6, 4–6
Loss	1985	French Open	Clay	(West Germany) Claudia Kohde-Kilsch	(United States) Martina Navratilova (United States) Pam Shriver	6–4, 2–6, 2–6
Win	1985	US Open	Hard	(West Germany) Claudia Kohde-Kilsch	(United States) Martina Navratilova (United States) Pam Shriver	6–7^{(5–7)}, 6–2, 6–3
Loss	1985	Australian Open	Grass	(West Germany) Claudia Kohde-Kilsch	(United States) Martina Navratilova (United States) Pam Shriver	3–6, 4–6
Win	1987	Wimbledon	Grass	(West Germany) Claudia Kohde-Kilsch	(United States) Betsy Nagelsen (Australia) Elizabeth Smylie	7–5, 7–5
Loss	1988	French Open	Clay	(West Germany) Claudia Kohde-Kilsch	(United States) Martina Navratilova (United States) Pam Shriver	2–6, 5–7
Win	1989	Wimbledon	Grass	(Czechoslovakia) Jana Novotná	(Soviet Union) Larisa Savchenko (Soviet Union) Natasha Zvereva	6–1, 6–2
Win	1990	Australian Open	Hard	(Czechoslovakia) Jana Novotná	(United States) Patty Fendick (United States) Mary Joe Fernández	7–6^{(7–5)}, 7–6^{(8–6)}
Win	1990	French Open	Clay	(Czechoslovakia) Jana Novotná	(Soviet Union) Larisa Neiland (Soviet Union) Natasha Zvereva	6–4, 7–5
Win	1990	Wimbledon	Grass	(Czechoslovakia) Jana Novotná	(United States) Kathy Jordan (Australia) Elizabeth Smylie	6–3, 6–4
Loss	1990	US Open	Hard	(Czechoslovakia) Jana Novotná	(United States) Gigi Fernández (United States) Martina Navratilova	2–6, 4–6
Win	1992	Australian Open	Hard	(Spain) Arantxa Sánchez Vicario	(United States) Mary Joe Fernandez (United States) Zina Garrison	6–4, 7–6^{(7–3)}
Win	1993	US Open	Hard	(Spain) Arantxa Sánchez Vicario	(South Africa) Amanda Coetzer (Argentina) Inés Gorrochategui	6–4, 6–2
Win	1996	Wimbledon	Grass	(Switzerland) Martina Hingis	(United States) Meredith McGrath (Latvia) Larisa Neiland	5–7, 7–5, 6–1

==== Mixed doubles: 8 (5 titles, 3 runners-up) ====
Result	Year	Championship	Surface	Partner	Opponents	Score
Win	1991	French Open	Clay	(Czechoslovakia) Cyril Suk	(Netherlands) Caroline Vis (Netherlands) Paul Haarhuis	3–6, 6–4, 6–1
Loss	1992	US Open	Hard	(Netherlands) Tom Nijssen	(Australia) Nicole Provis (Australia) Mark Woodforde	6–4, 3–6, 3–6
Win	1993	US Open	Hard	(Australia) Todd Woodbridge	(United States) Martina Navratilova (Australia) Mark Woodforde	6–3, 7–6^{(8–6)}
Loss	1994	Australian Open	Hard	(Australia) Todd Woodbridge	(Latvia) Larisa Neiland (Russia) Andrei Olhovskiy	5–7, 7–6^{(7–0)}, 2–6
Win	1994	Wimbledon	Grass	(Australia) Todd Woodbridge	(United States) Lori McNeil (United States) T.J. Middleton	3–6, 7–5, 6–3
Win	1996	Wimbledon	Grass	(Czechoslovakia) Cyril Suk	(Latvia) Larisa Neiland (Australia) Mark Woodforde	1–6, 6–3, 6–2
Win	1997	Wimbledon	Grass	(Czechoslovakia) Cyril Suk	(Latvia) Larisa Neiland (Russia) Andrei Olhovskiy	4–6, 6–3, 6–4
Loss	1998	Australian Open	Hard	(Czechoslovakia) Cyril Suk	(United States) Venus Williams (United States) Justin Gimelstob	2–6, 1–6

=== Olympics ===
==== Doubles: 2 medals (2 silver medals) ====
Result	Year	Location	Surface	Partner	Opponents	Score
Silver	1988	Seoul	Hard	(Czechoslovakia) Jana Novotná	(United States) Zina Garrison (United States) Pam Shriver	6–4, 2–6, 8–10
Silver	1996	Atlanta	Hard	(Czech Republic) Jana Novotná	(United States) Gigi Fernández (United States) Mary Joe Fernández	6–7^{(6–8)}, 4–6

=== WTA Finals ===
==== Singles: 1 (1 runner–up) ====
Result	Year	Location	Surface	Opponent	Score
Loss	1985	New York City	Carpet	(United States) Martina Navratilova	3–6, 5–7, 4–6

==== Doubles: 5 (1 title, 4 runners-up) ====
Result	Year	Location	Surface	Partner	Opponent	Score
Loss	1985	New York City	Carpet	(West Germany) Claudia Kohde-Kilsch	(United States) Martina Navratilova (United States) Pam Shriver	7–6^{(7–4)}, 4–6, 6–7^{(5–7)}
Loss	1986^{(Mar)}	New York City	Carpet	(West Germany) Claudia Kohde-Kilsch	(Czechoslovakia) Hana Mandlíková (Australia) Wendy Turnbull	4–6, 7–6^{(7–4)}, 3–6
Loss	1986^{(Nov)}	New York City	Carpet	(West Germany) Claudia Kohde-Kilsch	(United States) Martina Navratilova (United States) Pam Shriver	6–7^{(1–7)}, 3–6
Loss	1987	New York City	Carpet	(West Germany) Claudia Kohde-Kilsch	(United States) Martina Navratilova (United States) Pam Shriver	1–6, 1–6
Win	1992	New York City	Carpet	(Spain) Arantxa Sánchez Vicario	(Czech Republic) Jana Novotná (Latvia) Larisa Neiland	7–6^{(7–4)}, 6–1

== WTA Tour finals ==
=== Singles: 31 (10–21) ===
Winner — Legend Grand Slam tournaments (0–4) WTA Tour Championships (0–1) Tier I (0–1) Tier II (0–3) Tier III (1–2) Tier IV (2–2) Tier V (1–0) Virginia Slims (6–8)	Titles by surface Hard (4–5) Grass (2–6) Clay (0–2) Carpet (4–8)

Result	W–L	Date	Tournament	Tier	Surface	Opponent	Score
Win	1–0	Jan 1982	Newport News, US		Carpet	(Brazil) Patricia Medrado	6–2, 6–7, 6–0
Loss	1–1	Mar 1982	Austin, US		Carpet	(West Germany) Claudia Kohde-Kilsch	6–7^{(0–7)}, 6–0, 3–6
Loss	1–2	Aug 1982	Indianapolis, US	Regular	Clay	(Romania) Virginia Ruzici	2–6, 0–6
Loss	1–3	Mar 1984	Boston, US	Regular	Carpet	(Czechoslovakia) Hana Mandlíková	5–7, 0–6
Win	2–3	Nov 1984	Brisbane, Australia	Regular	Grass	(Australia) Elizabeth Smylie	6–4, 6–4
Loss	2–4	Nov 1984	Australian Open	Grand Slam	Grass	(United States) Chris Evert	7–6^{(7–4)}, 1–6, 3–6
Loss	2–5	Mar 1985	Virginia Slims Championships, US	Tour Finals	Carpet	(United States) Martina Navratilova	3–6, 5–7, 4–6
Loss	2–6	Jun 1985	Eastbourne, UK	Regular	Grass	(United States) Martina Navratilova	4–6, 3–6
Loss	2–7	Mar 1986	Princeton, US	Regular	Carpet	(United States) Martina Navratilova	6–3, 0–6, 6–7^{(5–7)}
Loss	2–8	Jun 1986	Eastbourne, UK	Regular	Grass	(United States) Martina Navratilova	6–3, 3–6, 4–6
Win	3–8	Aug 1986	Montreal, Canada	Regular	Hard	(United States) Pam Shriver	6–2, 7–5
Loss	3–9	Aug 1986	US Open	Grand Slam	Hard	(United States) Martina Navratilova	3–6, 2–6
Win	4–9	Sep 1986	Hilversum, Netherlands	Regular	Carpet	(France) Catherine Tanvier	6–2, 7–5
Loss	4–10	Oct 1986	Zurich, Switzerland	Regular	Carpet	(West Germany) Steffi Graf	6–4, 2–6, 4–6
Loss	4–11	Feb 1987	Boca Raton, US	Category 4	Hard	(West Germany) Steffi Graf	2–6, 3–6
Win	5–11	Mar 1987	Piscataway, US	Category 3	Carpet	(United States) Lori McNeil	6–0, 6–3
Win	6–11	Jun 1987	Eastbourne, UK	Category 4	Grass	(United States) Martina Navratilova	7–6^{(7–5)}, 6–3
Loss	6–12	Jan 1988	Sydney, Australia	Category 3	Grass	(United States) Pam Shriver	2–6, 3–6
Loss	6–13	Apr 1988	Tokyo, Japan	Category 4	Carpet	(United States) Pam Shriver	5–7, 1–6
Loss	6–14	May 1988	Berlin, West Germany	Category 5	Clay	(West Germany) Steffi Graf	3–6, 2–6
Win	7–14	Jan 1989	Brisbane, Australia	Category 2	Hard	(Netherlands) Brenda Schultz	7–6^{(8–6)}, 7–6^{(8–6)}
Loss	7–15	Jan 1989	Australian Open	Grand Slam	Hard	(West Germany) Steffi Graf	4–6, 4–6
Loss	7–16	Feb 1990	Indian Wells, US	Tier II	Hard	(United States) Martina Navratilova	2–6, 7–5, 1–6
Loss	7–17	Jun 1990	Birmingham, UK	Tier IV	Grass	(United States) Zina Garrison	4–6, 1–6
Loss	7–18	Oct 1990	Brighton, UK	Tier II	Carpet	(Germany) Steffi Graf	5–7, 3–6
Win	8–18	Dec 1990	Brisbane, Australia	Tier IV	Hard	(Japan) Akiko Kijimuta	6–4, 6–3
Win	9–18	Feb 1992	Osaka, Japan	Tier IV	Carpet	(Peru) Laura Gildemeister	6–2, 4–6, 6–1
Win	10–18	Nov 1992	Indianapolis, US	Tier IV	Hard (i)	(United States) Linda Harvey-Wild	6–4, 6–3
Loss	10–19	Aug 1993	US Open	Grand Slam	Hard	(Germany) Steffi Graf	3–6, 3–6
Loss	10–20	Oct 1994	Brighton, UK	Tier II	Carpet	(Czech Republic) Jana Novotná	7–6^{(7–4)}, 3–6, 4–6
Loss	10–21	Jun 1996	Rosmalen, Netherlands	Tier III	Grass	(Germany) Anke Huber	4–6, 6–7^{(2–7)}

=== Doubles 128 (69–59) ===
Winner — Legend Grand Slam tournaments (2–6) WTA Tour Championships (0–5) Olympic Games (0–2) Tier I (1–2) Tier II (1–3) Tier III (0–1) Tier IV (0–3) Tier V (2–1) Virginia Slims (19–18)	Titles by surface Hard (5–8) Grass (2–9) Clay (10–8) Carpet (8–14)

Result	W–L	Date	Tournament	Tier	Surface	Partner	Opponents	Score
Loss	0–1	Nov 1983	Sydney, Australia	Category 3	Grass	(Czechoslovakia) Hana Mandlíková	(United Kingdom) Anne Hobbs (Australia) Wendy Turnbull	4–6, 3–6
Win	1–1	Jan 1984	Marco Island, US	Category 2	Clay	(Czechoslovakia) Hana Mandlíková	(United Kingdom) Anne Hobbs (United States) Andrea Jaeger	3–6, 6–2, 6–2
Win	2–1	May 1984	Perugia, Italy	Regular	Clay	(Czech Republic) Iva Budařová	(United States) Kathleen Horvath (Romania) Virginia Ruzici	7–6^{(7–5)}, 1–6, 6–4
Win	3–1	Oct 1984	Filderstadt, West Germany	Regular	Carpet	(West Germany) Claudia Kohde-Kilsch	(West Germany) Bettina Bunge (West Germany) Eva Pfaff	6–2, 4–6, 6–3
Win	4–1	Nov 1984	Sydney, Australia	Regular	Grass	(West Germany) Claudia Kohde-Kilsch	(Australia) Wendy Turnbull (United States) Sharon Walsh	6–2, 7–6^{(7–4)}
Loss	4–2	Nov 1984	Australian Open	Grand Slam	Grass	(West Germany) Claudia Kohde-Kilsch	(United States) Martina Navratilova (United States) Pam Shriver	3–6, 4–6
Win	5–2	Dec 1984	Tokyo, Japan	Regular	Carpet	(West Germany) Claudia Kohde-Kilsch	(Australia) Elizabeth Smylie (France) Catherine Tanvier	6–4, 6–4
Loss	5–3	Jan 1985	Washington, D.C., US	Regular	Carpet	(West Germany) Claudia Kohde-Kilsch	(United States) Gigi Fernández (United States) Martina Navratilova	3–6, 6–3, 3–6
Loss	5–4	Mar 1985	VS Championships, US	Tour Finals	Carpet	(Germany) Claudia Kohde-Kilsch	(United States) Martina Navratilova (United States) Pam Shriver	7–6^{(9–7)}, 4–6, 6–7^{(5–7)}
Loss	5–5	Apr 1985	Houston, US	Regular	Clay	(Bulgaria) Manuela Maleeva	(United States) Elise Burgin (United States) Martina Navratilova	1–6, 6–3, 3–6
Win	6–5	May 1985	Berlin, West Germany	Regular	Clay	(West Germany) Claudia Kohde-Kilsch	(West Germany) Steffi Graf (France) Catherine Tanvier	6–4, 6–1
Win	7–5	May 1985	Lugano, Italy	Regular	Clay	(United States) Bonnie Gadusek	(West Germany) Bettina Bunge (West Germany) Eva Pfaff	6–2, 6–4
Loss	7–6	May 1985	French Open	Grand Slam	Clay	(West Germany) Claudia Kohde-Kilsch	(United States) Martina Navratilova (United States) Pam Shriver	6–4, 2–6, 2–6
Win	8–6	Jul 1985	Manhattan Beach, US	Regular	Hard	(West Germany) Claudia Kohde-Kilsch	(Czechoslovakia) Hana Mandlíková (Australia) Wendy Turnbull	6–4, 6–2
Loss	8–7	Aug 1985	Mahwah, US	Regular	Hard	(West Germany) Claudia Kohde-Kilsch	(United States) Kathy Jordan (Australia) Elizabeth Smylie	6–7^{(6–8)}, 3–6
Win	9–7	Aug 1985	US Open	Grand Slam	Hard	(West Germany) Claudia Kohde-Kilsch	(United States) Martina Navratilova (United States) Pam Shriver	6–7^{(5–7)}, 6–2, 6–3
Loss	9–8	Oct 1985	Brighton, UK	Regular	Carpet	(United States) Barbara Potter	(United States) Lori McNeil (France) Catherine Suire	6–4, 6–7^{(3–7)}, 4–6
Loss	9–9	Oct 1985	Zürich, switzerland	Regular	Carpet	(West Germany) Claudia Kohde-Kilsch	(Czechoslovakia) Hana Mandlíková (Hungary) Andrea Temesvári	4–6, 6–3, 5–7
Loss	9–10	Nov 1985	Brisbane, Australia	Regular	Grass	(West Germany) Claudia Kohde-Kilsch	(United States) Martina Navratilova (United States) Pam Shriver	4–6, 7–6^{(8–6)}, 1–6
Loss	9–11	Nov 1985	Australian Open	Grand Slam	Grass	(West Germany) Claudia Kohde-Kilsch	(United States) Martina Navratilova (United States) Pam Shriver	3–6, 4–6
Win	10–11	Dec 1985	Tokyo, Japan	Regular	Carpet	(West Germany) Claudia Kohde-Kilsch	(Netherlands) Marcella Mesker (Australia) Elizabeth Smylie	6–0, 6–4
Loss	10–12	Jan 1986	Washington, D.C., US	Regular	Carpet	(West Germany) Claudia Kohde-Kilsch	(United States) Martina Navratilova (United States) Pam Shriver	3–6, 4–6
Loss	10–13	Jan 1986	Worcester, US	Regular	Carpet	(West Germany) Claudia Kohde-Kilsch	(United States) Martina Navratilova (United States) Pam Shriver	3–6, 1–6
Win	11–13	Feb 1986	Boca West, US	Regular	Hard	(United States) Pam Shriver	(United States) Chris Evert (Australia) Wendy Turnbull	6–2, 6–3
Loss	11–14	Feb 1986	Oakland, US	Regular	Carpet	(United States) Bonnie Gadusek	(Czechoslovakia) Hana Mandlíková (Australia) Wendy Turnbull	6–7^{(5–7)}, 1–6
Loss	11–15	Mar 1986	Princeton, US	Regular	Carpet	(Czechoslovakia) Hana Mandlíková	(United States) Kathy Jordan (Australia) Elizabeth Smylie	3–6, 5–7
Win	12–15	Mar 1986	Dallas, US	Regular	Carpet	(West Germany) Claudia Kohde-Kilsch	(Czechoslovakia) Hana Mandlíková (Australia) Wendy Turnbull	4–6, 7–5, 6–4
Loss	12–16	Mar 1986	VS Championships, US	Tour Finals	Carpet	(West Germany) Claudia Kohde-Kilsch	(Czechoslovakia) Hana Mandlíková (Australia) Wendy Turnbull	4–6, 7–6^{(7–4)}, 3–6
Win	13–16	Apr 1986	Amelia Island, US	Regular	Clay	(West Germany) Claudia Kohde-Kilsch	(Argentina) Gabriela Sabatini (France) Catherine Tanvier	6–2, 5–7, 7–6^{(9–7)}
Win	14–16	May 1986	Berlin, West Germany	Regular	Clay	(West Germany) Steffi Graf	(United States) Martina Navratilova (Hungary) Andrea Temesvári	7–5, 6–2
Loss	14–17	Jun 1986	Eastbourne, UK	Regular	Grass	(West Germany) Claudia Kohde-Kilsch	(United States) Martina Navratilova (United States) Pam Shriver	2–6, 4–6
Loss	14–18	Aug 1986	Montreal, Canada	Regular	Hard	(United States) Pam Shriver	(United States) Zina Garrison (Argentina) Gabriela Sabatini	6–7^{(2–7)}, 7–5, 4–6
Loss	14–19	Aug 1986	Manhattan Beach, US	Regular	Hard	(West Germany) Claudia Kohde-Kilsch	(United States) Martina Navratilova (United States) Pam Shriver	4–6, 3–6
Loss	14–20	Aug 1986	Mahwah, US	Regular	Hard	(West Germany) Steffi Graf	(United States) Betsy Nagelsen (Australia) Elizabeth Smylie	6–7^{(4–7)}, 3–6
Win	15–20	Sep 1986	Hilversum, Netherlands	Regular	Carpet	(United States) Kathy Jordan	(Denmark) Tine Scheuer-Larsen (France) Catherine Tanvier	7–5, 6–1
Win	16–20	Oct 1986	Brighton, UK	Regular	Carpet	(West Germany) Steffi Graf	(Denmark) Tine Scheuer-Larsen (France) Catherine Tanvier	6–4, 6–4
Loss	16–21	Nov 1986	Worcester, US	Regular	Carpet	(West Germany) Claudia Kohde-Kilsch	(United States) Martina Navratilova (United States) Pam Shriver	5–7, 3–6
Win	17–21	Nov 1986	Chicago, US	Regular	Carpet	(West Germany) Claudia Kohde-Kilsch	(West Germany) Steffi Graf (Argentina) Gabriela Sabatini	6–7^{(5–7)}, 7–6^{(7–5)}, 6–3
Loss	17–22	Nov 1986	VS Championships, US	Tour Finals	Carpet	(West Germany) Claudia Kohde-Kilsch	(United States) Martina Navratilova (United States) Pam Shriver	6–7^{(1–7)}, 3–6
Win	18–22	Jan 1987	Tokyo, Japan	Tour Finals	Carpet	(West Germany) Claudia Kohde-Kilsch	(United States) Elise Burgin (United States) Pam Shriver	6–1, 7–6^{(7–5)}
Loss	18–23	Feb 1987	Key Biscayne, US	Category 4	Hard	(West Germany) Claudia Kohde-Kilsch	(United States) Martina Navratilova (United States) Pam Shriver	3–6, 6–7^{(6–8)}
Loss	18–24	May 1987	Rome, Italy	Category 3	Clay	(West Germany) Claudia Kohde-Kilsch	(United States) Martina Navratilova (Argentina) Gabriela Sabatini	4–6, 1–6
Win	19–24	May 1987	Berlin. West Germany	Category 3	Clay	(West Germany) Claudia Kohde-Kilsch	(Sweden) Catarina Lindqvist (Denmark) Tine Scheuer-Larsen	6–1, 6–2
Win	20–24	Jun 1987	Wimbledon	Grand Slam	Grass	(West Germany) Claudia Kohde-Kilsch	(United States) Betsy Nagelsen (Australia) Elizabeth Smylie	7–5, 7–5
Loss	20–25	Aug 1987	Toronto, Canada	Category 4	Hard	(West Germany) Claudia Kohde-Kilsch	(United States) Zina Garrison (United States) Lori McNeil	1–6, 2–6
Win	21–25	Oct 1987	Brighton, UK	Category 3	Carpet	(United States) Kathy Jordan	(Denmark) Tine Scheuer-Larsen (France) Catherine Tanvier	7–5, 6–1
Win	22–25	Nov 1987	Chicago, US	Category 3	Carpet	(West Germany) Claudia Kohde-Kilsch	(United States) Zina Garrison (United States) Lori McNeil	6–4, 6–3
Loss	22–26	Nov 1987	VS Championships, US	Tour Finals	Carpet	(West Germany) Claudia Kohde-Kilsch	(United States) Martina Navratilova (United States) Pam Shriver	1–6, 1–6
Loss	22–27	Dec 1987	Brisbane, Australia	Category 2	Grass	(West Germany) Claudia Kohde-Kilsch	(United States) Betsy Nagelsen (United States) Pam Shriver	6–2, 5–7, 2–6
Loss	22–28	Jan 1988	Sydney, Australia	Category 3	Grass	(West Germany) Claudia Kohde-Kilsch	(United States) Ann Henricksson (Switzerland) Christiane Jolissaint	6–7^{(5–7)}, 6–4, 3–6
Loss	22–29	Feb 1988	Washington, D.C., US	Category 5	Carpet	(Argentina) Gabriela Sabatini	(United States) Martina Navratilova (United States) Pam Shriver	3–6, 4–6
Win	23–29	Feb 1988	San Antonio, US	Category 3	Hard	(United States) Lori McNeil	(South Africa) Rosalyn Fairbank (United States) Gretchen Magers	6–3, 6–7^{(5–7)}, 6–2
Loss	23–30	Mar 1988	Boca Raton, US	Category 5	Hard	(West Germany) Claudia Kohde-Kilsch	(United States) Katrina Adams (United States) Zina Garrison	6–4, 5–7, 4–6
Win	24–30	Apr 1988	Tokyo, Japan	Category 4	Carpet	(United States) Pam Shriver	(United States) Gigi Fernández (United States) Robin White	4–6, 6–2, 7–6^{(7–5)}
Loss	24–31	May 1988	Berlin, Germany	Category 5	Clay	(West Germany) Claudia Kohde-Kilsch	(France) Isabelle Demongeot (France) Nathalie Tauziat	2–6, 6–4, 4–6
Loss	24–32	May 1988	French Open	Grand Slam	Clay	(West Germany) Claudia Kohde-Kilsch	(United States) Martina Navratilova (United States) Pam Shriver	2–6, 5–7
Win	25–32	Aug 1988	Montreal, Canada	Category 5	Hard	(Czechoslovakia) Jana Novotná	(United States) Zina Garrison (United States) Pam Shriver	7–6^{(7–2)}, 7–6^{(8–6)}
Win	26–32	Aug 1988	Mahwah, US	Category 3	Hard	(Czechoslovakia) Jana Novotná	(United States) Gigi Fernández (United States) Robin White	6–3, 6–2
Loss	26–33	Sep 1988	Seoul, South Korea	Olympics	Hard	(Czechoslovakia) Jana Novotná	(United States) Zina Garrison (United States) Pam Shriver	6–4, 2–6, 8–10
Loss	26–34	Oct 1988	Zürich, Switzerland	Category 3	Carpet	(West Germany) Claudia Kohde-Kilsch	(France) Isabelle Demongeot (France) Nathalie Tauziat	3–6, 3–6
Loss	26–35	Oct 1988	Worcester, US	Category 5	Carpet	(Argentina) Gabriela Sabatini	(United States) Martina Navratilova (United States) Pam Shriver	3–6, 6–3, 5–7
Win	27–35	Jan 1989	Brisbane, Australia	Category 2	Hard	(Czech Republic) Jana Novotná	(United States) Patty Fendick (Canada) Jill Hetherington	6–7^{(4–7)}, 6–1, 6–2
Win	28–35	Mar 1989	Boca Raton, US	Category 5	Hard	(Czech Republic) Jana Novotná	(United Kingdom) Jo Durie (United States) Mary Joe Fernández	6–4, 6–2
Win	29–35	Mar 1989	Miami, US	Category 5	Hard	(Czech Republic) Jana Novotná	(United States) Gigi Fernández (United States) Lori McNeil	7–6^{(7–5)}, 6–4
Loss	29–36	May 1989	Hamburg, West Germany	Category 3	Clay	(Czech Republic) Jana Novotná	(France) Isabelle Demongeot (France) Nathalie Tauziat	w/o
Loss	29–37	Jun 1989	Eastbourne, UK	Category 5	Grass	(Czech Republic) Jana Novotná	(United States) Katrina Adams (United States) Zina Garrison	3–6 ret.
Win	30–37	Jun 1989	Wimbledon	Grand Slam	Grass	(Czech Republic) Jana Novotná	(Soviet Union) Larisa Savchenko (Soviet Union) Natasha Zvereva	6–1, 6–2
Win	31–37	Oct 1989	Zürich, Switzerland	Category 4	Carpet	(Czech Republic) Jana Novotná	(France) Nathalie Tauziat (Austria) Judith Wiesner	6–3, 3–6, 6–4
Loss	31–38	Nov 1989	Chicago, US	Category 4	Carpet	(Czech Republic) Jana Novotná	(Soviet Union) Larisa Savchenko (Soviet Union) Natasha Zvereva	3–6, 6–2, 3–6
Win	32–38	Jan 1990	Brisbane, Australia	Tier IV	Hard	(Czech Republic) Jana Novotná	(Australia) Hana Mandlíková (United States) Pam Shriver	6–3, 6–1
Win	33–38	Jan 1990	Sydney, Australia	Tier III	Hard	(Czech Republic) Jana Novotná	(Soviet Union) Larisa Neiland (Soviet Union) Natasha Zvereva	6–3, 7–5
Win	34–38	Jan 1990	Australian Open	Grand Slam	Hard	(Czech Republic) Jana Novotná	(United States) Patty Fendick (United States) Mary Joe Fernández	7–6^{(7–5)}, 7–6^{(8–6)}
Win	35–38	Feb 1990	Indian Wells, US	Tier II	Hard	(Czech Republic) Jana Novotná	(United States) Gigi Fernández (United States) Martina Navratilova	6–2, 7–6^{(8–6)}
Win	36–38	Mar 1990	Boca Raton, US	Tier II	Hard	(Czech Republic) Jana Novotná	(United States) Elise Burgin (Australia) Wendy Turnbull	6–4, 6–2
Win	37–38	Mar 1990	Miami, US	Tier I	Hard	(Czech Republic) Jana Novotná	(United States) Betsy Nagelsen (United States) Robin White	6–4, 6–3
Loss	37–39	Apr 1990	Hamburg, Germany	Tier II	Clay	(Soviet Union) Larisa Neiland	(United States) Gigi Fernández (United States) Martina Navratilova	2–6, 3–6
Win	38–39	May 1990	French Open	Grand Slam	Clay	(Czech Republic) Jana Novotná	(Soviet Union) Larisa Neiland (Soviet Union) Natasha Zvereva	6–4, 7–5
Win	39–39	Jun 1990	Wimbledon	Grand Slam	Grass	(Czech Republic) Jana Novotná	(United States) Kathy Jordan (Australia) Elizabeth Smylie	6–3, 6–4
Loss	39–40	Aug 1990	US Open	Grand Slam	Hard	(Czech Republic) Jana Novotná	(United States) Gigi Fernández (United States) Martina Navratilova	2–6, 4–6
Win	40–40	Oct 1990	Brighton, UK	Tier II	Carpet	(France) Nathalie Tauziat	(United Kingdom) Jo Durie (Soviet Union) Natasha Zvereva	6–1, 6–4
Win	41–40	Nov 1990	Worcester, US	Tier II	Carpet	(United States) Gigi Fernández	(United States) Mary Joe Fernández (Czech Republic) Jana Novotná	3–6, 6–3, 6–3
Loss	41–41	Dec 1990	Brisbane, Australia	Tier IV	Hard	(United States) Patty Fendick	(United States) Gigi Fernández (Czech Republic) Jana Novotná	3–6, 1–6
Win	42–41	Jan 1991	Sydney, Australia	Tier III	Hard	(Spain) Arantxa Sánchez Vicario	(United States) Gigi Fernández (Czech Republic) Jana Novotná	6–1, 6–4
Win	43–41	Mar 1991	Tampa, US	Tour Finals	Clay	(United States) Gigi Fernández	(Soviet Union) Larisa Neiland (Soviet Union) Natasha Zvereva	6–4, 4–6, 7–6^{(7–3)}
Win	44–41	Apr 1991	Amelia Island, US	Tier II	Clay	(Spain) Arantxa Sánchez Vicario	(Argentina) Mercedes Paz (Soviet Union) Natasha Zvereva	4–6, 6–2, 6–2
Loss	44–42	Apr 1991	Hamburg, Germany	Tier II	Clay	(Spain) Arantxa Sánchez Vicario	(Czech Republic) Jana Novotná (Soviet Union) Larisa Neiland	5–7, 1–6
Loss	44–43	Aug 1991	Toronto, Canada	Tier I	Hard	(Germany) Claudia Kohde-Kilsch	(Soviet Union) Larisa Neiland (Soviet Union) Natasha Zvereva	6–1, 5–7, 2–6
Win	45–43	Jan 1992	Sydney, Australia	Tier III	Hard	(Spain) Arantxa Sánchez Vicario	(United States) Mary Joe Fernández (United States) Zina Garrison	7–6^{(7–4)}, 6–7^{(4–7)}, 6–2
Win	46–43	Jan 1992	Australian Open	Grand Slam	Hard	(Spain) Arantxa Sánchez Vicario	(United States) Mary Joe Fernández (United States) Zina Garrison	6–4, 7–6^{(7–3)}
Win	47–43	Jan 1992	Tokyo, Japan	Tier II	Carpet	(Spain) Arantxa Sánchez Vicario	(United States) Martina Navratilova (United States) Pam Shriver	7–5, 6–1
Win	48–43	Feb 1992	Osaka, Japan	Tier IV	Carpet	(Australia) Rennae Stubbs	(United States) Sandy Collins (Australia) Rachel McQuillan	3–6, 6–4, 7–5
Win	49–43	May 1992	Rome, Italy	Tier I	Clay	(Socialist Federal Republic of Yugoslavia) Monica Seles	(Bulgaria) Katerina Maleeva (Austria) Barbara Rittner	6–1, 6–2
Win	50–43	Aug 1992	Manhattan Beach, US	Tier II	Hard	(Spain) Arantxa Sánchez Vicario	(United States) Zina Garrison (United States) Pam Shriver	6–4, 6–2
Win	51–43	Oct 1992	Zürich, Switzerland	Tier II	Carpet	(Belarus) Natasha Zvereva	(United States) Martina Navratilova (United States) Pam Shriver	7–6^{(7–5)}, 6–4
Win	52–42	Oct 1992	Filderstadt, Germany	Tier II	Carpet	(Spain) Arantxa Sánchez Vicario	(United States) Pam Shriver (Belarus) Natasha Zvereva	6–4, 7–5
Win	53–43	Nov 1992	VS Championships, US	Tour Finals	Carpet	(Spain) Arantxa Sánchez Vicario	(Czech Republic) Jana Novotná (Latvia) Larisa Neiland	7–6^{(7–4)}, 6–1
Win	54–43	Feb 1993	Tokyo, Japan	Tier I	Carpet	(United States) Martina Navratilova	(United States) Lori McNeil (Australia) Rennae Stubbs	6–4, 6–3
Win	55–43	Feb 1993	Indian Wells, US	Tier II	Hard	(Australia) Rennae Stubbs	(United States) Ann Grossman (Canada) Patricia Hy	6–3, 6–4
Win	56–43	May 1993	Lucerne, Switzerland	Tier III	Clay	(United States) Mary Joe Fernández	(United States) Lindsay Davenport (United States) Marianne Werdel	6–2, 6–4
Win	57–43	Jul 1993	Stratton Mountain, US	Tier II	Hard	(Australia) Elizabeth Smylie	(Switzerland) Manuela Maleeva (Argentina) Mercedes Paz	6–1, 6–2
Win	58–43	Aug 1993	San Diego, US	Tier II	Hard	(United States) Gigi Fernández	(United States) Pam Shriver (Australia) Elizabeth Smylie	6–4, 6–3
Win	59–43	Aug 1993	Manhattan Beach, US	Tier II	Hard	(Spain) Arantxa Sánchez Vicario	(United States) Gigi Fernández (Belarus) Natasha Zvereva	7–6^{(7–4)}, 6–3
Loss	59–44	Aug 1993	Toronto, Canada	Tier I	Hard	(Spain) Arantxa Sánchez Vicario	(Czech Republic) Jana Novotná (Latvia) Larisa Neiland	1–6, 2–6
Win	60–44	Aug 1993	US Open	Grand Slam	Hard	(Spain) Arantxa Sánchez Vicario	(South Africa) Amanda Coetzer (Argentina) Inés Gorrochategui	6–4, 6–2
Win	61–44	Oct 1993	Essen, Germany	Tier II	Carpet	(Spain) Arantxa Sánchez Vicario	(Germany) Wiltrud Probst (Germany) Christina Singer	6–2, 6–2
Loss	61–45	Feb 1994	Indian Wells, US	Tier II	Hard	(Netherlands) Manon Bollegraf	(United States) Lindsay Davenport (United States) Lisa Raymond	2–6, 4–6
Loss	61–46	Feb 1994	Delray Beach, US	Tier II	Hard	(Netherlands) Manon Bollegraf	(Czech Republic) Jana Novotná (Spain) Arantxa Sánchez Vicario	2–6, 0–6
Loss	61–47	Jun 1994	Eastbourne, UK	Tier II	Grass	(Argentina) Inés Gorrochategui	(United States) Gigi Fernández (Belarus) Natasha Zvereva	7–6^{(7–4)}, 4–6, 3–6
Loss	61–48	Oct 1995	Brighton, UK	Tier II	Carpet	(United States) Lori McNeil	(United States) Meredith McGrath (Latvia) Larisa Neiland	5–7, 1–6
Win	62–48	Oct 1995	Oakland, US	Tier II	Carpet	(United States) Lori McNeil	(United States) Katrina Adams (United States) Zina Garrison	3–6, 6–4, 6–3
Win	63–48	Nov 1995	Philadelphia, US	Tier I	Carpet	(United States) Lori McNeil	(United States) Meredith McGrath (Latvia) Larisa Neiland	4–6, 6–3, 6–4
Loss	63–49	Jan 1996	Sydney, Australia	Tier II	Hard	(United States) Lori McNeil	(United States) Lindsay Davenport (United States) Mary Joe Fernández	3–6, 3–6
Loss	63–50	Feb 1996	Essen, Germany	Tier II	Carpet	(United States) Lori McNeil	(United States) Meredith McGrath (Latvia) Larisa Neiland	6–3, 3–6, 2–6
Loss	63–51	Feb 1996	Linz, Austria	Tier III	Carpet	(Australia) Rennae Stubbs	(Netherlands) Manon Bollegraf (United States) Meredith McGrath	4–6, 4–6
Loss	63–52	May 1996	Berlin, Germany	Tier I	Clay	(Switzerland) Martina Hingis	(United States) Meredith McGrath (Latvia) Larisa Neiland	1–6, 7–5, 6–7^{(4–7)}
Loss	63–53	Jun 1996	Rosmalen, Netherlands	Tier III	Grass	(Netherlands) Kristie Boogert	(Latvia) Larisa Neiland (Netherlands) Brenda Schultz-McCarthy	4–6, 6–7^{(7–9)}
Win	64–53	Jun 1996	Wimbledon	Grand Slam	Grass	(Switzerland) Martina Hingis	(United States) Meredith McGrath (Latvia) Larisa Neiland	5–7, 7–5, 6–1
Loss	64–54	Jul 1996	Atlanta, US	Olympics	Hard	(Czech Republic) Jana Novotná	(United States) Gigi Fernández (United States) Mary Joe Fernández	6–7^{(6–8)}, 4–6
Loss	64–55	Aug 1996	Montreal, Canada	Tier I	Hard	(United States) Mary Joe Fernández	(Spain) Arantxa Sánchez Vicario (Latvia) Larisa Neiland	6–7^{(1–7)}, 1–6
Win	65–55	Sep 1996	Karlovy Vary, Czech Republic	Tier IV	Clay	(Slovakia) Karina Habšudová	(Czech Republic) Eva Martincová (Germany) Elena Wagner	3–6, 6–3, 6–2
Loss	65–56	Oct 1996	Filderstadt, Germany	Tier II	Hard (i)	(Switzerland) Martina Hingis	(United States) Nicole Arendt (Czech Republic) Jana Novotná	2–6, 3–6
Win	66–56	Oct 1996	Zürich, Switzerland	Tier I	Carpet	(Switzerland) Martina Hingis	(United States) Nicole Arendt (Belarus) Natasha Zvereva	7–5, 6–4
Win	67–56	May 1997	Strasbourg, France	Tier III	Clay	(Belarus) Natasha Zvereva	(Russia) Elena Likhovtseva (Japan) Ai Sugiyama	6–1, 6–1
Loss	67–57	Aug 1997	Manhattan Beach, US	Tier II	Hard	(Latvia) Larisa Neiland	(Indonesia) Yayuk Basuki (Netherlands) Caroline Vis	6–7^{(7–9)}, 3–6
Loss	67–58	Sep 1997	Leipzig< Germany	Tier II	Carpet	(Indonesia) Yayuk Basuki	(Switzerland) Martina Hingis (Czech Republic) Jana Novotná	2–6, 2–6
Loss	67–59	Oct 1997	Zürich, Switzerland	Tier I	Carpet	(Latvia) Larisa Neiland	(Switzerland) Martina Hingis (Spain) Arantxa Sánchez Vicario	6–4, 4–6, 1–6
Win	68–59	Oct 1997	Luxembourg City, Luxembourg	Tier III	Carpet	(Latvia) Larisa Neiland	(Germany) Meike Babel (Belgium) Laurence Courtois	6–2, 6–4
Win	69–59	Jan 1998	Sydney, Australia	Tier II	Hard	(Switzerland) Martina Hingis	(United States) Katrina Adams (United States) Meredith McGrath	6–1, 6–2
