= 1993 World Ladies in Osaka – Singles =

Singles
- 1993 World Ladies in Osaka

Final
- Champion: (Czech Republic) Jana Novotná
- Runner-up: (Japan) Kimiko Date
- Score: 6–3, 6–2

Details
- Draw: 32 (2WC/4Q/1LL)
- Seeds: 8

Events
Singles	Doubles
← 1992 ·	Asian Open	· 1994 →

Helena Suková was the defending champion, but did not compete this year.

Jana Novotná won the title by defeating Kimiko Date 6–3, 6–2 in the final.

== Seeds ==
1. (Czech Republic) Jana Novotná (champion)
2. (Switzerland) Manuela Maleeva-Fragnière (first round)
3. (Bulgaria) Magdalena Maleeva (quarterfinals)
4. (Japan) Naoko Sawamatsu (second round)
5. (Japan) Kimiko Date (final)
6. (Chinese Taipei) Wang Shi-ting (quarterfinals)
7. (France) Pascale Paradis-Mangon (semifinals)
8. (Peru) Laura Gildemeister (semifinals)

== Draw ==
Key

- Q = Qualifier
- WC = Wild card
- LL = Lucky loser
- Alt = Alternate
- ITF = ITF entry
- PR = Protected ranking
- SR = Special ranking
- SE = Special exempt
- JE = Junior exempt
- JR = Junior Accelerator Programme entrant
- CO = College Accelerator Programme entrant
- NG = Next Gen Accelerator Program entrant
- w/o = Walkover
- r = Retired
- d = Defaulted

=== Finals ===
Semifinals
1	(Czech Republic) Jana Novotná	3	7^{7}	6
7	(France) Pascale Paradis-Mangon	6	6^{1}	2
5	(Japan) Kimiko Date	6	6^{9}	6
8	(Peru) Laura Gildemeister	1	7^{11}	2

Final
1	(Czech Republic) Jana Novotná	6	6
5	(Japan) Kimiko Date	3	2

=== Top half ===
First round
1	(Czech Republic) J Novotná	7	6
(Japan) M Endo	5	3
WC	(Indonesia) J Sutedja	3	7^{11}	6
(Japan) M Kidowaki	6	6^{9}	3
(Japan) K Nagatsuka	2	4
(Japan) A Sugiyama	6	6
(Australia) K Godridge	0	5
6	(Chinese Taipei) S-t Wang	6	7
4	(Japan) N Sawamatsu	6	7
Q	(Japan) T Takagi	1	5
LL	(China) F Li	2	4
(Japan) M Miyauchi	6	6
(Australia) R McQuillan	6	6
(Australia) M Jaggard-Lai	3	4
(Japan) Y Kamio	6	2	2
7	(France) P Paradis-Mangon	2	6	6

Second round
1	(Czech Republic) J Novotná	6	6
WC	(Indonesia) J Sutedja	0	0
(Japan) A Sugiyama	2	4
6	(Chinese Taipei) S-t Wang	6	6
4	(Japan) N Sawamatsu	6	4	3
(Japan) M Miyauchi	1	6	6
(Australia) R McQuillan	3	5
7	(France) P Paradis-Mangon	6	7

Quarterfinals
1	(Czech Republic) J Novotná	6	6
6	(Chinese Taipei) S-t Wang	3	1
(Japan) M Miyauchi	1	4
7	(France) P Paradis-Mangon	6	6

Semifinals
1	(Czech Republic) J Novotná	3	7^{7}	6
7	(France) P Paradis-Mangon	6	6^{1}	2

=== Bottom half ===
First round
5	(Japan) K Date	6	6
(Japan) R Hiraki	2	2
(Australia) K Radford	6	6
(New Zealand) J Richardson	3	2
(South Korea) S-h Park	6^{5}	2
Q	(Japan) M Yanagi	7^{7}	6
Q	(Australia) D Jones	0	0
3	(Bulgaria) M Maleeva	6	6
8	(Peru) L Gildemeister	6	6
WC	(Japan) Seiko Ichioka	2	1
(United States) K Rinaldi	4	6	6
(Australia) R Stubbs	6	2	4
(Australia) JA Faull	6	2	2
(Japan) N Miyagi	3	6	6
Q	(Australia) E Smylie	6	6
2	(Switzerland) M Maleeva-Fragnière	2	4

Second round
5	(Japan) K Date	6	6
(Australia) K Radford	0	0
Q	(Japan) M Yanagi	3	1
3	(Bulgaria) M Maleeva	6	6
8	(Peru) L Gildemeister	5	6	6
(United States) K Rinaldi	7	3	2
(Japan) N Miyagi	7^{7}	1	0
Q	(Australia) E Smylie	6^{2}	6	6

Quarterfinals
5	(Japan) K Date	6^{1}	7^{7}	6
3	(Bulgaria) M Maleeva	7^{7}	6^{2}	2
8	(Peru) L Gildemeister	4	6	6
Q	(Australia) E Smylie	6	1	4

Semifinals
5	(Japan) K Date	6	6^{9}	6
8	(Peru) L Gildemeister	1	7^{11}	2
