= 1993 World Ladies in Osaka – Doubles =

Doubles
- 1993 World Ladies in Osaka

Final
- Champions: (Latvia) Larisa Neiland (Czech Republic) Jana Novotná
- Runners-up: (Bulgaria) Magdalena Maleeva (Switzerland) Manuela Maleeva-Fragnière
- Score: 6–1, 6–3

Details
- Draw: 16 (1WC/1Q)
- Seeds: 4

Events
Singles	Doubles
← 1992 ·	Asian Open	· 1994 →

Rennae Stubbs and Helena Suková were the defending champions, but Suková did not compete this year. Stubbs teamed up with Elizabeth Smylie and lost in the quarterfinals to Magdalena Maleeva and Manuela Maleeva-Fragnière.

Larisa Neiland and Jana Novotná won the title by defeating Maleeva and Maleeva-Fragniére 6–1, 6–3 in the final.

== Seeds ==
1. (Latvia) Larisa Neiland / (Czech Republic) Jana Novotná (champions)
2. (Australia) Elizabeth Smylie / (Australia) Rennae Stubbs (quarterfinals)
3. (Canada) Jill Hetherington / (United States) Kathy Rinaldi (semifinals)
4. (Australia) Rachel McQuillan / (Australia) Nicole Provis (first round)

== Draw ==
Key

- Q = Qualifier
- WC = Wild card
- LL = Lucky loser
- Alt = Alternate
- ITF = ITF entry
- PR = Protected ranking
- SR = Special ranking
- SE = Special exempt
- JE = Junior exempt
- JR = Junior Accelerator Programme entrant
- CO = College Accelerator Programme entrant
- NG = Next Gen Accelerator Program entrant
- w/o = Walkover
- r = Retired
- d = Defaulted

=== Draw ===
First round
1	(Latvia) L Neiland (Czech Republic) J Novotná	6	6
(Australia) JA Faull (New Zealand) J Richardson	3	3
(Japan) M Kidowaki (Japan) N Sawamatsu	4	0
WC	(China) L Chen (China) F Li	6	6
4	(Australia) R McQuillan (Australia) N Provis	6	6^{8}	3
(Peru) L Gildemeister (Hungary) A Temesvári	4	7^{10}	6
(Japan) K Date (Japan) A Sugiyama	1	2
(Japan) E Iida (Australia) K Radford	6	6
(Japan) R Hiraki (Japan) N Miyagi	6	2	6
(Australia) KA Guse (Australia) D Jones	3	6	2
Q	(Japan) T Takagi (Japan) M Yanagi	3	4
3	(Canada) J Hetherington (United States) K Rinaldi	6	6
(Japan) Y Kamio (Japan) M Miyauchi	0	3
(Bulgaria) M Maleeva (Switzerland) M Maleeva-Fragnière	6	6
(Australia) K Godridge (Australia) T Morton	4	6	1
2	(Australia) E Smylie (Australia) R Stubbs	6	2	6

Quarterfinals
1	(Latvia) L Neiland (Czech Republic) J Novotná	6	6
WC	(China) L Chen (China) F Li	3	1
(Peru) L Gildemeister (Hungary) A Temesvári	7	6
(Japan) E Iida (Australia) K Radford	5	4
(Japan) R Hiraki (Japan) N Miyagi	3	3
3	(Canada) J Hetherington (United States) K Rinaldi	6	6
(Bulgaria) M Maleeva (Switzerland) M Maleeva-Fragnière	6	6^{6}	6
2	(Australia) E Smylie (Australia) R Stubbs	2	7^{8}	1

Semifinals
1	(Latvia) L Neiland (Czech Republic) J Novotná	6	7^{7}
(Peru) L Gildemeister (Hungary) A Temesvári	4	6^{2}
3	(Canada) J Hetherington (United States) K Rinaldi	6^{2}	5
(Bulgaria) M Maleeva (Switzerland) M Maleeva-Fragnière	7^{7}	7

Final
1	(Latvia) L Neiland (Czech Republic) J Novotná	6	6
(Bulgaria) M Maleeva (Switzerland) M Maleeva-Fragnière	1	3
