= 1991 Porsche Tennis Grand Prix =

- Date: 14–20 October
- Edition: 14th
- Category: Tier II
- Draw: 32S / 16D
- Prize money: $350,000
- Surface: Hard (Greenset) / indoor
- Location: Filderstadt, Germany
- Venue: Filderstadt Tennis Centre

Champions

Singles
- (West Germany) Anke Huber

Doubles
- (United States) Martina Navratilova / (Czechoslovakia) Jana Novotná
← 1990 ·	Porsche Tennis Grand Prix	· 1992 →

The 1991 Porsche Tennis Grand Prix was a women's tennis tournament played on indoor hard courts at the Filderstadt Tennis Centre in Filderstadt, Germany and was part of the Tier II of the 1991 WTA Tour. It was the 14th edition of the tournament and was held from 14 October to 20 October 1991. Unseeded Anke Huber won the singles title and earned $70,000 first-prize money.

== Finals ==
=== Singles ===
(West Germany) Anke Huber defeated (United States) Martina Navratilova 2–6, 6–2, 7–6^{(7–4)}

- It was Huber's 1st singles title of the year and the 2nd of her career.

=== Doubles ===
(United States) Martina Navratilova / (Czechoslovakia) Jana Novotná defeated (United States) Pam Shriver / (Soviet Union) Natasha Zvereva 6–2, 5–7, 6–4

== Prize money and ranking points ==
Event		W	F	SF	QF	Round of 16	Round of 32
Singles	Prize money	$70,000	$31,500	$15,750	$7,900	$4,000	$2,100
Singles	Points	300	210	135	70	35	18
