= 1992 Mizuno World Ladies =

- Date: February 4–9
- Edition: 1st
- Category: Tier IV
- Draw: 32S / 16D
- Prize money: $150,000
- Surface: Carpet / indoor
- Location: Osaka, Japan
- Venue: Amagasaki Memorial Sports Centre

Champions

Singles
- (Czechoslovakia) Helena Suková

Doubles
- (Australia) Rennae Stubbs / (Czechoslovakia) Helena Suková
Asian Open	· 1993 →

The 1992 Mizuno World Ladies was a women's tennis tournament played on indoor carpet courts at the Amagasaki Memorial Sports Centre in Osaka in Japan that was part of Tier IV of the 1992 WTA Tour. It was the inaugural edition of the tournament and was held from February 9 through February 9, 1992. Second-seeded Helena Suková won the singles title and earned $27,000 first-prize money.

== Finals ==
=== Singles ===
(Czechoslovakia) Helena Suková defeated (Peru) Laura Gildemeister 6–2, 4–6, 6–1

- It was Suková's 1st singles title of the year and the 9th of her career.

=== Doubles ===
(Australia) Rennae Stubbs / (Czechoslovakia) Helena Suková defeated (United States) Sandy Collins / (Australia) Rachel McQuillan 3–6, 6–4, 7–5

- It was Stubbs' first doubles title of her career. It was Suková's 4th doubles title of the year and the 48th of her career.
