= 1990 Toray Pan Pacific Open – Singles =

Singles
- 1990 Toray Pan Pacific Open

Final
- Champion: (Germany) Steffi Graf
- Runner-up: (Spain) Arantxa Sánchez Vicario
- Score: 6–1, 6–2

Details
- Draw: 28 (3Q/2LL)
- Seeds: 8

Events
Singles	Doubles
← 1989 ·	Pan Pacific Open	· 1991 →

Martina Navratilova was the defending champion, but did not compete this year.

Steffi Graf won the title by defeating Arantxa Sánchez Vicario 6–1, 6–2 in the final.

== Seeds ==
The first four seeds received a bye into the second round.

1. (West Germany) Steffi Graf (champion)
2. (Spain) Arantxa Sánchez Vicario (final)
3. (Switzerland) Manuela Maleeva-Fragnière (semifinals)
4. (n/a)
5. (Soviet Union) Larisa Savchenko (quarterfinals)
6. (United States) Gigi Fernández (quarterfinals)
7. (United States) Lori McNeil (first round)
8. (Australia) Anne Minter (first round)

== Draw ==
=== Key ===
- Q = Qualifier
- WC = Wild card
- LL = Lucky loser
- Alt = Alternate
- SE = Special exempt
- PR = Protected ranking
- ITF = ITF entry
- JE = Junior exempt
- w/o = Walkover
- r = Retired
- d = Defaulted
- SR = Special ranking

=== Finals ===
Semifinals
1	(West Germany) Steffi Graf	6	6
3	(Switzerland) Manuela Maleeva-Fragnière	4	4
(Japan) Akiko Kijimuta	4	2
2	(Spain) Arantxa Sánchez Vicario	6	6

Final
1	(West Germany) Steffi Graf	6	6
2	(Spain) Arantxa Sánchez Vicario	1	2

=== Top half ===
First round
(United States) C Benjamin	3	3
(Netherlands) N Jagerman	6	6
(United States) P Louie Harper	2	6	6
Q	(United States) S Collins	6	4	2
(West Germany) C Porwik	4	4
5	(Soviet Union) L Savchenko	6	6
Q	(Japan) A Nishiya	5	1
(United States) T Phelps	7	6
(Netherlands) B Schultz	6	7
(Australia) R McQuillan	3	5
(Japan) E Inoue	6	7
8	(Australia) A Minter	2	6

Second round
1	(West Germany) S Graf	6	6
(Netherlands) N Jagerman	0	1
(United States) P Louie Harper	6	6	6
5	(Soviet Union) L Savchenko	4	7	7
3	(Switzerland) M Maleeva-Fragnière	6	6
(United States) T Phelps	2	1
(Netherlands) B Schultz	6	6
(Japan) E Inoue	1	2

Quarterfinals
1	(West Germany) S Graf	6	6
5	(Soviet Union) L Savchenko	0	3
3	(Switzerland) M Maleeva-Fragnière	6	6
(Netherlands) B Schultz	2	0

Semifinals
1	(West Germany) S Graf	6	6
3	(Switzerland) M Maleeva-Fragnière	4	4

=== Bottom half ===
First round
7	(United States) L McNeil	3	6	3
(Japan) A Kijimuta	6	3	6
(United States) C MacGregor	6	6
LL	(United States) H Ludloff	4	4
(United States) K Adams	2	6	3
LL	(Japan) N Miyagi	6	3	6
6	(United States) G Fernández	6	6
(Japan) K Date	1	4
(Japan) K Okamoto	3	3
Q	(Japan) M Kidowaki	6	6
(Australia) JA Faull	1	6
(Australia) E Smylie	6	2	r

Second round
(Japan) A Kijimuta	6	3	6
(United States) C MacGregor	1	6	1
LL	(Japan) N Miyagi	7	6
(Japan) R Hiraki	6	2
6	(United States) G Fernández	6	6
Q	(Japan) M Kidowaki	3	3
(Australia) JA Faull	1	0
2	(Spain) A Sánchez Vicario	6	6

Quarterfinals
(Japan) A Kijimuta	7	2	6
LL	(Japan) N Miyagi	6	6	2
6	(United States) G Fernández	6	1	2
2	(Spain) A Sánchez Vicario	1	6	6

Semifinals
(Japan) A Kijimuta	4	2
2	(Spain) A Sánchez Vicario	6	6
