= 1991 Porsche Tennis Grand Prix – Singles =

Singles
- 1991 Porsche Tennis Grand Prix

Final
- Champion: (Germany) Anke Huber
- Runner-up: (United States) Martina Navratilova
- Score: 2–6, 6–2, 7–6^{(7–4)}

Details
- Draw: 32 (4Q/1LL)
- Seeds: 8

Events
Singles	Doubles
← 1990 ·	Women's Stuttgart Open	· 1992 →

Mary Joe Fernández was the defending champion, but lost in the quarterfinals to Helena Suková.

16-year old Anke Huber won the title by defeating Martina Navratilova 2–6, 6–2, 7–6^{(7–4)} in the final.

== Seeds ==
1. (United States) Martina Navratilova (final)
2. (United States) Mary Joe Fernández (quarterfinals)
3. (Spain) Conchita Martínez (first round)
4. (Czechoslovakia) Jana Novotná (quarterfinals)
5. (United States) Zina Garrison (quarterfinals)
6. (Soviet Union) Leila Meskhi (second round)
7. (Czechoslovakia) Helena Suková (semifinals)
8. (France) Nathalie Tauziat (quarterfinals)

== Draw ==
=== Key ===
- Q = Qualifier
- WC = Wild card
- LL = Lucky loser
- Alt = Alternate
- SE = Special exempt
- PR = Protected ranking
- ITF = ITF entry
- JE = Junior exempt
- w/o = Walkover
- r = Retired
- d = Defaulted
- SR = Special ranking

=== Finals ===
Semifinals
1	(United States) Martina Navratilova	6	7^{7}
(Austria) Judith Wiesner	2	6^{4}
(Germany) Anke Huber	6	7^{7}
7	(Czechoslovakia) Helena Suková	3	6^{2}

Final
1	(United States) Martina Navratilova	6	2	6^{4}
(Germany) Anke Huber	2	6	7^{7}

=== Top half ===
First round
1	(United States) M Navratilova	6	6
Q	(Germany) M Babel	4	2
(Austria) B Paulus	6^{6}	3
(South Africa) E Reinach	7^{8}	6
(Netherlands) M Bollegraf	6	7
(Luxembourg) K Kschwendt	3	5
(United States) P Shriver	7	3	1
8	(France) N Tauziat	5	6	6
4	(Czechoslovakia) J Novotná	6	6
(Germany) K Oeljeklaus	3	3
(Soviet Union) M Medvedeva	3	6	6
(Canada) H Kelesi	6	4	4
(Sweden) C Lindqvist	2	2
(Austria) J Wiesner	6	6
(Australia) R McQuillan	2	5
6	(Soviet Union) L Meskhi	6	7

Second round
1	(United States) M Navratilova	6	7
(South Africa) E Reinach	4	5
(Netherlands) M Bollegraf
8	(France) N Tauziat	w/o
4	(Czechoslovakia) J Novotná	6	6
(Soviet Union) M Medvedeva	4	4
(Austria) J Wiesner	6	1	6
6	(Soviet Union) L Meskhi	1	6	4

Quarterfinals
1	(United States) M Navratilova	6	7
8	(France) N Tauziat	4	5
4	(Czechoslovakia) J Novotná	6^{7}	3
(Austria) J Wiesner	7^{9}	6

Semifinals
1	(United States) M Navratilova	6	7^{7}
(Austria) J Wiesner	2	6^{4}

=== Bottom half ===
First round
5	(United States) Z Garrison	6	4	6
Q	(United States) G Helgeson	4	6	1
(Netherlands) B Schultz	6	7^{8}
LL	(Hungary) A Temesvári	0	6^{6}
(United States) L McNeil	4	1
(Germany) A Huber	6	6
(Soviet Union) N Zvereva	7^{7}	7
3	(Spain) C Martínez	6^{1}	5
7	(Czechoslovakia) H Suková	7^{7}	7^{7}
Q	(Germany) W Probst	6^{3}	6^{2}
(United States) A Frazier	6	6
(West Germany) E Pfaff	2	1
(Italy) R Reggi-Concato	1	2
(Czechoslovakia) R Zrubáková	6	6
Q	(Czechoslovakia) K Habšudová	0	4
2	(United States) MJ Fernández	6	6

Second round
5	(United States) Z Garrison	6	4	6
(Netherlands) B Schultz	3	6	2
(Germany) A Huber	6	6
(Soviet Union) N Zvereva	2	2
7	(Czechoslovakia) H Suková	6^{2}	7	6
(United States) A Frazier	7^{7}	5	3
(Czechoslovakia) R Zrubáková	1	1
2	(United States) MJ Fernández	6	6

Quarterfinals
5	(United States) Z Garrison	2	1
(Germany) A Huber	6	6
7	(Czechoslovakia) H Suková	5	6	6
2	(United States) MJ Fernández	7	3	3

Semifinals
(Germany) A Huber	6	7^{7}
7	(Czechoslovakia) H Suková	3	6^{2}
