= 1992 Porsche Tennis Grand Prix – Singles =

Singles
- 1992 Porsche Tennis Grand Prix

Final
- Champion: (United States) Martina Navratilova
- Runner-up: (Argentina) Gabriela Sabatini
- Score: 7–6^{(7–1)}, 6–3

Details
- Draw: 32 (2WC/4Q/1LL)
- Seeds: 8

Events
Singles	Doubles
← 1991 ·	Women's Stuttgart Open	· 1993 →

Anke Huber was the defending champion, but lost in the quarterfinals to Mary Joe Fernández.

Martina Navratilova won the title by defeating Gabriela Sabatini 7–6^{(7–1)}, 6–3 in the final.

== Seeds ==
1. (Argentina) Gabriela Sabatini (final)
2. (Spain) Arantxa Sánchez Vicario (semifinals)
3. (United States) Martina Navratilova (champion)
4. (United States) Mary Joe Fernández (semifinals)
5. (Germany) Anke Huber (quarterfinals)
6. (France) Nathalie Tauziat (second round)
7. (Czechoslovakia) Helena Suková (quarterfinals)
8. (United States) Lori McNeil (first round)

== Draw ==
=== Key ===
- Q = Qualifier
- WC = Wild card
- LL = Lucky loser
- Alt = Alternate
- ITF = ITF entry
- PR = Protected ranking
- SR = Special ranking
- SE = Special exempt
- JE = Junior exempt
- JR = Junior Accelerator Programme entrant
- CO = College Accelerator Programme entrant
- NG = Next Gen Accelerator Program entrant
- w/o = Walkover
- r = Retired
- d = Defaulted

=== Finals ===
Semifinals
1	(Argentina) Gabriela Sabatini	7	6
4	(United States) Mary Joe Fernández	5	2
3	(United States) Martina Navratilova	6	6
2	(Spain) Arantxa Sánchez Vicario	1	1

Final
1	(Argentina) Gabriela Sabatini	6^{1}	3
3	(United States) Martina Navratilova	7^{7}	6

=== Top half ===
First round
1	(Argentina) G Sabatini	6	6
Q	(Germany) K Kschwendt	4	2
Q	(South Africa) E Reinach	2	7^{7}	5
(Commonwealth of Independent States) N Medvedeva	6	6^{4}	7
(Germany) W Probst	6	6
WC	(Germany) C Porwik	1	3
LL	(Hungary) A Temesvári-Trunkos	6^{2}	6	7
8	(United States) L McNeil	7^{7}	3	5
4	(United States) MJ Fernández	6	3	6
(Netherlands) B Schultz	2	6	3
(Commonwealth of Independent States) N Zvereva	6	6
(United States) P Shriver	3	2
Q	(Sweden) C Dahlman	4	1
(Commonwealth of Independent States) L Meskhi	6	6
Q	(France) N Herreman	4	0
5	(Germany) A Huber	6	6

Second round
1	(Argentina) G Sabatini	6	6
(Commonwealth of Independent States) N Medvedeva	4	4
(Germany) W Probst	7	6^{3}	6
LL	(Hungary) A Temesvári-Trunkos	5	7^{7}	1
4	(United States) MJ Fernández	6	0	6
(Commonwealth of Independent States) N Zvereva	2	6	2
(Commonwealth of Independent States) L Meskhi	6	0^{r}
5	(Germany) A Huber	4	4

Quarterfinals
1	(Argentina) G Sabatini	6	6
(Germany) W Probst	4	1
4	(United States) MJ Fernández	5	6	6
5	(Germany) A Huber	7	3	1

Semifinals
1	(Argentina) G Sabatini	7	6
4	(United States) MJ Fernández	5	2

=== Bottom half ===
First round
7	(Czechoslovakia) H Suková	6	6
(Czechoslovakia) K Habšudová	1	3
(Germany) B Rittner	3	6^{6}
(Czechoslovakia) R Zrubáková	6	7^{8}
(South Africa) D Van Rensburg	6	2	3
(Germany) V Martinek	4	6	6
(Canada) P Hy	6^{5}	1
3	(United States) M Navratilova	7^{7}	6
6	(France) N Tauziat	6^{3}	6	6
(Peru) L Gildemeister	7^{7}	2	1
WC	(Germany) M Babel	2	4
(Austria) J Wiesner	6	6
(Belgium) S Appelmans	6	6
(United States) S Rehe	2	3
(France) P Paradis-Mangon	5	4
2	(Spain) A Sánchez Vicario	7	6

Second round
7	(Czechoslovakia) H Suková	6	6
(Czechoslovakia) R Zrubáková	4	4
(Germany) V Martinek	4	1
3	(United States) M Navratilova	6	6
6	(France) N Tauziat	3	4
(Austria) J Wiesner	6	6
(Belgium) S Appelmans	6^{5}	2
2	(Spain) A Sánchez Vicario	7^{7}	6

Quarterfinals
7	(Czechoslovakia) H Suková	3	6^{4}
3	(United States) M Navratilova	6	7^{7}
(Austria) J Wiesner	1	1
2	(Spain) A Sánchez Vicario	6	6

Semifinals
3	(United States) M Navratilova	6	6
2	(Spain) A Sánchez Vicario	1	1
