= 1990 Toray Pan Pacific Open – Doubles =

Doubles
- 1990 Toray Pan Pacific Open

Final
- Champions: (United States) Gigi Fernández (Australia) Elizabeth Smylie
- Runners-up: (Australia) Jo-Anne Faull (Australia) Rachel McQuillan
- Score: 6–2, 6–2

Details
- Draw: 16
- Seeds: 4

Events
Singles	Doubles
← 1989 ·	Pan Pacific Open	· 1991 →

Katrina Adams and Zina Garrison were the defending champions, but Garrison did not compete this year. Adams teamed up with Lori McNeil and lost in the semifinals to Gigi Fernández and Elizabeth Smylie.

Fernández and Smylie won the title by defeating Jo-Anne Faull and Rachel McQuillan 6–2, 6–2 in the final.

== Seeds ==
1. (United States) Mary Joe Fernández / (Soviet Union) Larisa Savchenko (quarterfinals)
2. (United States) Gigi Fernández / (Australia) Elizabeth Smylie (champions)
3. (United States) Katrina Adams / (United States) Lori McNeil (semifinals)
4. (West Germany) Steffi Graf / (West Germany) Claudia Porwik (first round)

== Draw ==
=== Key ===
- Q = Qualifier
- WC = Wild card
- LL = Lucky loser
- Alt = Alternate
- SE = Special exempt
- PR = Protected ranking
- ITF = ITF entry
- JE = Junior exempt
- w/o = Walkover
- r = Retired
- d = Defaulted
- SR = Special ranking

=== Draw ===
First round
1	(United States) MJ Fernández (Soviet Union) L Savchenko	6	4	7
(Japan) E Inoue (Switzerland) M Maleeva-Fragnière	3	6	6
(Australia) JA Faull (Australia) R McQuillan	6	5	6
(Japan) E Iida (Japan) Yasuyo Kajita	3	7	1
4	(West Germany) S Graf (West Germany) C Porwik	3	6	3
(Spain) A Sánchez Vicario (Netherlands) B Schultz	6	3	6
(United States) S Collins (United States) J Smoller	1	6	6
(Japan) R Hikari (Japan) N Sato	6	1	3
(Japan) N Miyagi (Japan) T Takagi	4	1
(Japan) K Date (Japan) M Kidowaki	6	6
(United States) A Gooden (United States) Sylvia Schenck	3	2
3	(United States) K Adams (United States) L McNeil	6	6
(United States) P Louie Harper (United States) C MacGregor	7	6
(United States) T Phelps (Australia) A Minter	6	3
(United States) C Benjamin (Netherlands) N Jagerman	0	3
2	(United States) G Fernández (Australia) E Smylie	6	6

Quarterfinals
1	(United States) MJ Fernández (Soviet Union) L Savchenko
(Australia) JA Faull (Australia) R McQuillan	w/o
(Spain) A Sánchez Vicario (Netherlands) B Schultz	4	6	4
(United States) S Collins (United States) J Smoller	6	4	6
(Japan) K Date (Japan) M Kidowaki	6	3	5
3	(United States) K Adams (United States) L McNeil	2	6	7
(United States) P Louie Harper (United States) C MacGregor	5	3
2	(United States) G Fernández (Australia) E Smylie	7	6

Semifinals
(Australia) JA Faull (Australia) R McQuillan	4	6	6
(United States) S Collins (United States) J Smoller	6	1	2
3	(United States) K Adams (United States) L McNeil	3	4
2	(United States) G Fernández (Australia) E Smylie	6	6

Final
(Australia) JA Faull (Australia) R McQuillan	2	2
2	(United States) G Fernández (Australia) E Smylie	6	6
