= Asian Open =

Asian Open may refer to:

- Men's golf's BMW Asian Open
- A former name of snooker's Thailand Masters
- A former name of tennis's Thailand Open
- Asian Open (tennis), a defunct WTA Tour affiliated women's tennis tournament played
- Asian Open Figure Skating Trophy
