= 1994 Asia Women's Tennis Open =

1994 Asia Women’s Tennis Open
- Date: February 8–13
- Edition: 3rd
- Category: Tier III
- Draw: 32S / 16D
- Prize money: $150,000
- Surface: Carpet / indoor
- Location: Osaka, Japan
- Venue: Amagasaki Memorial Sports Centre

Champions

Singles
- (Switzerland) Manuela Maleeva-Fragniere

Doubles
- (Latvia) Larisa Neiland / (Australia) Rennae Stubbs
| ← 1993 · | Asian Open |

The 1994 Asian Open was a women's tennis tournament played on indoor carpet courts at the Amagasaki Memorial Sports Centre in Osaka in Japan that was part of Tier III of the 1994 WTA Tour. The tournament was held from February 8 through February 13, 1994. First-seeded Manuela Maleeva-Fragniere won the singles title.

== Finals ==
=== Singles ===
(Switzerland) Manuela Maleeva-Fragniere defeated (Croatia) Iva Majoli 6–1, 4–6, 7–5

- It was Maleeva-Fragniere's only title of the year and the 24th of her career.

=== Doubles ===
(Latvia) Larisa Neiland / (Australia) Rennae Stubbs defeated (United States) Pam Shriver / (Australia) Elizabeth Smylie 6–4, 6–7, 7–5

- It was Neiland's 2nd title of the year and the 47th of her career. It was Stubbs' 1st title of the year and the 7th of her career.
