= 1989 Toray Pan Pacific Open – Doubles =

Doubles
- 1989 Toray Pan Pacific Open
- 1988 Champions: (United States) Pam Shriver (Czechoslovakia) Helena Suková

Final
- Champions: (United States) Katrina Adams (United States) Zina Garrison
- Runners-up: (United States) Mary Joe Fernández (West Germany) Claudia Kohde-Kilsch
- Score: 6–3, 3–6, 7–6

Details
- Draw: 16
- Seeds: 4

Events
Singles	Doubles
← 1988 ·	Toray Pan Pacific Open	· 1990 →

Pam Shriver and Helena Suková were the defending champions but did not compete that year.

Katrina Adams and Zina Garrison won in the final 6–3, 3–6, 7–6 against Mary Joe Fernández and Claudia Kohde-Kilsch.

== Seeds ==
Champion seeds are indicated in bold text while text in italics indicates the round in which those seeds were eliminated.

1. (United States) **Katrina Adams** / (United States) **Zina Garrison (champions)**
2. (United States) Lori McNeil / (United States) Robin White (semifinals)
3. (Soviet Union) Leila Meskhi / (Soviet Union) Larisa Savchenko (semifinals)
4. (United States) Mary Joe Fernández / (West Germany) Claudia Kohde-Kilsch (final)

== Draw ==
=== Key ===
- Q = Qualifier
- WC = Wild card
- LL = Lucky loser
- Alt = Alternate
- SE = Special exempt
- PR = Protected ranking
- ITF = ITF entry
- JE = Junior exempt
- w/o = Walkover
- r = Retired
- d = Defaulted
- SR = Special ranking

First round
1	(United States) **K Adams** (United States) **Z Garrison**	5	**6**	**6**
(Japan) N Miyagi (Japan) T Takagi	**7**	3	3
(United States) E O'Neill (Japan) N Sawamatsu	5	**6**	3
(Japan) **K Ito** (Japan) **Y Kajita**	**7**	3	**6**
3	(Soviet Union) **L Meskhi** (Soviet Union) **L Savchenko**	**6**	**7**
(Australia) N Provis (Italy) R Reggi	4	6
(United States) **P Louie-Harper** (United States) **W White**	**6**	**6**
(Japan) Y Koizumi (Japan) M Mizokuchi	2	3
(United States) M Van Nostrand (Japan) M Yanagi	6	2
(Peru) **P Collantes** (Japan) **R Hiraki**	**7**	**6**
(United States) J Goodling (Japan) A Nishiya	4	1
4	(United States) **M J Fernández** (West Germany) **C Kohde-Kilsch**	**6**	**6**
(Japan) **E Okagawa** (Japan) **K Okamoto**	**6**	**7**
(Japan) M Kidowaki (Japan) N Sato	4	5
(United States) A Grossman (Japan) E Iida	1	1
2	(United States) **L McNeil** (United States) **R White**	**6**	**6**

Quarterfinals
1	(United States) **K Adams** (United States) **Z Garrison**	**6**	**6**
(Japan) K Ito (Japan) Y Kajita	1	4
3	(Soviet Union) **L Meskhi** (Soviet Union) **L Savchenko**	**6**	2	**6**
(United States) P Louie-Harper (United States) W White	2	**6**	3
(Peru) P Collantes (Japan) R Hiraki	4	5
4	(United States) **M J Fernández** (West Germany) **C Kohde-Kilsch**	**6**	**7**
(Japan) E Okagawa (Japan) K Okamoto	1	0
2	(United States) **L McNeil** (United States) **R White**	**6**	**6**

Semifinals
1	(United States) **K Adams** (United States) **Z Garrison**	4	**6**	**6**
3	(Soviet Union) L Meskhi (Soviet Union) L Savchenko	**6**	3	4
4	(United States) **M J Fernández** (West Germany) **C Kohde-Kilsch**	6	**6**	**6**
2	(United States) L McNeil (United States) R White	**7**	4	2

Final
1	(United States) **Katrina Adams** (United States) **Zina Garrison**	**6**	3	**7**
4	(United States) Mary Joe Fernández (West Germany) Claudia Kohde-Kilsch	3	**6**	6
