= 1991 Porsche Tennis Grand Prix – Doubles =

Doubles
- 1991 Porsche Tennis Grand Prix

Final
- Champions: (United States) Martina Navratilova (Czechoslovakia) Jana Novotná
- Runners-up: (United States) Pam Shriver (Soviet Union) Natasha Zvereva
- Score: 6–2, 5–7, 6–4

Details
- Draw: 16 (1Q)
- Seeds: 4

Events
Singles	Doubles
← 1990 ·	Women's Stuttgart Open	· 1992 →

Mary Joe Fernández and Zina Garrison were the defending champions, but lost in the first round to Eva Pfaff and Claudia Porwik.

Martina Navratilova and Jana Novotná won the title by defeating Pam Shriver and Natasha Zvereva 6–2, 5–7, 6–4 in the final.

== Seeds ==
1. (United States) Martina Navratilova / (Czechoslovakia) Jana Novotná (champions)
2. (United States) Pam Shriver / (Soviet Union) Natasha Zvereva (final)
3. (United States) Mary Joe Fernández / (United States) Zina Garrison (first round)
4. (United States) Lori McNeil / (Czechoslovakia) Helena Suková (semifinals)

== Draw ==
=== Key ===
- Q = Qualifier
- WC = Wild card
- LL = Lucky loser
- Alt = Alternate
- SE = Special exempt
- PR = Protected ranking
- ITF = ITF entry
- JE = Junior exempt
- w/o = Walkover
- r = Retired
- d = Defaulted
- SR = Special ranking

=== Draw ===
First round
1	(United States) M Navratilova (Czechoslovakia) J Novotná	6	7^{7}
(United States) A Frazier (United States) G Helgeson	3	6^{5}
(Soviet Union) M Medvedeva (Germany) W Probst	6	2	6
(Sweden) C Lindqvist (Italy) R Reggi-Concato	2	6	3
4	(United States) L McNeil (Czechoslovakia) H Suková	6	2	6
(United States) S Collins (South Africa) E Reinach	2	6	3
(United States) K Adams (Netherlands) M Bollegraf	1	6	3
(France) N Tauziat (Austria) J Wiesner	6	3	6
(Australia) R McQuillan (Soviet Union) L Meskhi	6	6
(Germany) M Babel (Germany) C Singer	3	3
(Germany) E Pfaff (Germany) C Porwik	6	6
3	(United States) MJ Fernández (United States) Z Garrison	4	4
(Luxembourg) K Kschwendt (Netherlands) B Schultz	6^{10}	1
Q	(United States) H Ludloff (France) C Suire	7^{12}	6
(Hungary) A Temesvári (Czechoslovakia) R Zrubáková	3	1
2	(United States) P Shriver (Soviet Union) N Zvereva	6	6

Quarterfinals
1	(United States) M Navratilova (Czechoslovakia) J Novotná	6	6
(Soviet Union) M Medvedeva (Germany) W Probst	1	3
4	(United States) L McNeil (Czechoslovakia) H Suková	6	6
(France) N Tauziat (Austria) J Wiesner	2	1
(Australia) R McQuillan (Soviet Union) L Meskhi	6	6
(Germany) E Pfaff (Germany) C Porwik	2	4
Q	(United States) H Ludloff (France) C Suire	2	6^{2}
2	(United States) P Shriver (Soviet Union) N Zvereva	6	7^{7}

Semifinals
1	(United States) M Navratilova (Czechoslovakia) J Novotná	6	6
4	(United States) L McNeil (Czechoslovakia) H Suková	1	4
(Australia) R McQuillan (Soviet Union) L Meskhi	3	6^{2}
2	(United States) P Shriver (Soviet Union) N Zvereva	6	7^{7}

Final
1	(United States) M Navratilova (Czechoslovakia) J Novotná	6	5	6
2	(United States) P Shriver (Soviet Union) N Zvereva	2	7	4
