= 1989 Toray Pan Pacific Open – Singles =

Singles
- 1989 Toray Pan Pacific Open

Final
- Champion: (United States) Martina Navratilova
- Runner-up: (United States) Lori McNeil
- Score: 6–7, 6–3, 7–6

Details
- Draw: 28 (4 Q )
- Seeds: 8

Events
Singles	Doubles
← 1988 ·	Pan Pacific Open	· 1990 →

Pam Shriver was the defending champion but did not compete that year.

First-seeded Martina Navratilova won in the final 6–7, 6–3, 7–6 against Lori McNeil.

== Seeds ==
A champion seed is indicated in bold text while text in italics indicates the round in which that seed was eliminated. The top four seeds received a bye to the second round.

1. (United States) **Martina Navratilova (champion)**
2. (United States) Chris Evert (quarterfinals)
3. (Argentina) Gabriela Sabatini (quarterfinals)
4. (Soviet Union) Natasha Zvereva (second round)
5. (United States) Zina Garrison (semifinals)
6. (West Germany) Claudia Kohde-Kilsch (quarterfinals)
7. (United States) Lori McNeil (final)
8. (United States) Mary Joe Fernández (semifinals)

== Draw ==
=== Key ===
- Q = Qualifier
- WC = Wild card
- LL = Lucky loser
- Alt = Alternate
- SE = Special exempt
- PR = Protected ranking
- ITF = ITF entry
- JE = Junior exempt
- w/o = Walkover
- r = Retired
- d = Defaulted
- SR = Special ranking

=== Final ===
Final
1	(United States) **Martina Navratilova**	6	**6**	**7**
7	(United States) Lori McNeil	**7**	3	6

=== Section 1 ===
First round
(Soviet Union) L Savchenko	**7**	5	4
LL	(Japan) **N Miyagi**	5	**7**	**6**
(Soviet Union) L Meskhi	3	4
(Italy) **R Reggi**	**6**	**6**
(Japan) E Inoue	4	5
6	(West Germany) **C Kohde-Kilsch**	**6**	**7**
(Japan) **A Nishiya**	3	**6**	**6**
(United States) K Adams	**6**	3	4
(Japan) **N Kijimuta**	**6**	**6**
(Japan) M Yanagi	3	0
Q	(Japan) T Takagi	3	0
8	(United States) **M J Fernández**	**6**	**6**

Second round
1	(United States) **M Navratilova**	**6**	**6**
LL	(Japan) N Miyagi	4	1
(Italy) R Reggi	2	2
6	(West Germany) **C Kohde-Kilsch**	**6**	**6**
3	(Argentina) **G Sabatini**	**6**	**6**
(Japan) A Nishiya	3	2
(Japan) N Kijimuta	0	2
8	(United States) **M J Fernández**	**6**	**6**

Quarterfinals
1	(United States) **M Navratilova**	**6**	**6**
6	(West Germany) C Kohde-Kilsch	2	2
3	(Argentina) G Sabatini	2	2
8	(United States) **M J Fernández**	**6**	**6**

Semifinals
1	(United States) **M Navratilova**	**6**	**6**
8	(United States) M J Fernández	2	2

=== Section 2 ===
First round
5	(United States) **Z Garrison**	**6**	**6**
(United States) A Grossman	3	0
(United States) **W White**	**7**	**6**
LL	(Japan) K Okamoto	6	0
(Japan) N Sawamatsu	**6**	4	2
Q	(United States) **M Van Nostrand**	2	**6**	**6**
7	(United States) **L McNeil**	**7**	**6**
(Australia) N Provis	5	2
Q	(Japan) M Kidowaki	**6**	3	1
(United States) **P Louie-Harper**	4	**6**	**6**
(United States) E O'Neill	**7**	3	3
Q	(United States) **A Leand**	6	**6**	**6**

Second round
5	(United States) **Z Garrison**	**6**	**6**
(United States) W White	3	2
Q	(United States) **M Van Nostrand**	**6**	**7**
4	(Soviet Union) N Zvereva	2	5
7	(United States) **L McNeil**	**6**	**6**
(United States) P Louie-Harper	4	1
Q	(United States) A Leand	2	**6**	3
2	(United States) **C Evert**	**6**	4	**6**

Quarterfinals
5	(United States) **Z Garrison**	**6**	**6**
Q	(United States) M Van Nostrand	1	0
7	(United States) **L McNeil**	**6**	5	**6**
2	(United States) C Evert	2	**7**	4

Semifinals
5	(United States) Z Garrison	**7**	4	4
7	(United States) **L McNeil**	5	**6**	**6**
