= 1992 Mizuno World Ladies – Singles =

Singles
- 1992 Mizuno World Ladies

Final
- Champion: (Czechoslovakia) Helena Suková
- Runner-up: (Peru) Laura Gildemeister
- Score: 6–2, 4–6, 6–1

Details
- Draw: 28 (2WC/4Q/1LL)
- Seeds: 8

Events
Singles	Doubles
Asian Open	· 1993 →

In the inaugural edition of the tournament, Helena Suková won the title by defeating Laura Gildemeister 6–2, 4–6, 6–1 in the final.

== Seeds ==
The first four seeds received a bye to the second round.

1. (Switzerland) ~~Manuela Maleeva-Fragnière~~ (withdrew)
2. (Czechoslovakia) Helena Suková (champion)
3. (Peru) Laura Gildemeister (final)
4. (Japan) Kimiko Date (semifinals)
5. (Australia) Rachel McQuillan (quarterfinals)
6. (Indonesia) Yayuk Basuki (first round)
7. (Japan) Naoko Sawamatsu (quarterfinals)
8. (Bulgaria) Magdalena Maleeva (first round)

== Draw ==
=== Key ===
- Q = Qualifier
- WC = Wild card
- LL = Lucky loser
- Alt = Alternate
- ITF = ITF entry
- PR = Protected ranking
- SR = Special ranking
- SE = Special exempt
- JE = Junior exempt
- JR = Junior Accelerator Programme entrant
- CO = College Accelerator Programme entrant
- NG = Next Gen Accelerator Program entrant
- w/o = Walkover
- r = Retired
- d = Defaulted

=== Finals ===
Semifinals
(Czechoslovakia) Karina Habšudová	3	7^{7}	1
3	(Peru) Laura Gildemeister	6	6^{4}	6
4	(Japan) Kimiko Date	2	2
2	(Czechoslovakia) Helena Suková	6	6

Final
3	(Peru) Laura Gildemeister	2	6	1
2	(Czechoslovakia) Helena Suková	6	4	6

=== Top half ===
First round
(Japan) N Miyagi	6	4	7^{9}
(Australia) A Minter	2	6	6^{7}
(Czechoslovakia) E Švíglerová	3	4
(Japan) M Endo	6	6
(Czechoslovakia) K Habšudová	2	7^{7}	7
8	(Bulgaria) M Maleeva	6	6^{2}	5
WC	(Japan) K Nagatsuka	6	7
(United States) J Emmons	3	5
Q	(Japan) Y Kamio	6	4	7
(Commonwealth of Independent States) E Brioukhovets	3	6	5
(Japan) M Miyauchi	6	4	6
6	(Indonesia) Y Basuki	3	6	4

Second round
LL	(Japan) K Okamoto	3	7^{8}	6
(Japan) N Miyagi	6	6^{6}	4
(Japan) M Endo	4	2
(Czechoslovakia) K Habšudová	6	6
3	(Peru) L Gildemeister	7^{12}	6
WC	(Japan) K Nagatsuka	6^{10}	1
Q	(Japan) Y Kamio	6	6
(Japan) M Miyauchi	2	4

Quarterfinals
LL	(Japan) K Okamoto	0	1
(Czechoslovakia) K Habšudová	6	6
3	(Peru) L Gildemeister	6	6
Q	(Japan) Y Kamio	1	2

Semifinals
(Czechoslovakia) K Habšudová	3	7^{7}	1
3	(Peru) L Gildemeister	6	6^{4}	6

=== Bottom half ===
First round
5	(Australia) R McQuillan	7^{7}	7^{7}
(United States) C Cunningham	6^{4}	6^{4}
(United States) H Ludloff	4	6	1
Q	(Japan) T Takagi	6	3	6
Q	(Japan) A Sugiyama	1	6	7
Q	(Japan) N Kijimuta	6	2	5
7	(Japan) N Sawamatsu	1	7	6
(United States) S Rehe	6	5	1
WC	(Chinese Taipei) S-t Wang	2	6	6
(United States) A Henricksson	6	1	3
(Japan) A Kijimuta	2	6	2
(Japan) R Hiraki	6	4	6

Second round
5	(Australia) R McQuillan	6	3	6
Q	(Japan) T Takagi	4	6	2
Q	(Japan) A Sugiyama	1	7	3
4	(Japan) K Date	6	5	6
7	(Japan) N Sawamatsu	4	6	6
WC	(Chinese Taipei) S-t Wang	6	2	2
(Japan) R Hiraki	5	6^{2}
2	(Czechoslovakia) H Suková	7	7^{7}

Quarterfinals
5	(Australia) R McQuillan	3	2
4	(Japan) K Date	6	6
7	(Japan) N Sawamatsu	1	7	2
2	(Czechoslovakia) H Suková	6	5	6

Semifinals
4	(Japan) K Date	2	2
2	(Czechoslovakia) H Suková	6	6
