= 1988 Pan Pacific Open – Doubles =

Doubles
- 1988 Pan Pacific Open
- 1987 Champions: (United States) Anne White (United States) Robin White

Final
- Champions: (United States) Pam Shriver (Czechoslovakia) Helena Suková
- Runners-up: (United States) Gigi Fernández (United States) Robin White
- Score: 4–6, 6–2, 7–6

Details
- Draw: 16
- Seeds: 4

Events
Singles	Doubles
← 1987 ·	Pan Pacific Open	· 1989 →

Anne White and Robin White were the defending champions but only Robin White competed that year with Gigi Fernández.

Fernández and White lost in the final 4–6, 6–2, 7–6 against Pam Shriver and Helena Suková.

== Seeds ==
Champion seeds are indicated in bold text while text in italics indicates the round in which those seeds were eliminated.

1. (United States) **Pam Shriver** / (Czechoslovakia) **Helena Suková (champions)**
2. (Australia) Elizabeth Smylie / (Australia) Wendy Turnbull (semifinals)
3. (United States) Gigi Fernández / (United States) Robin White (final)
4. (Soviet Union) Leila Meskhi / (Soviet Union) Natasha Zvereva (semifinals)

== Draw ==
=== Key ===
- Q = Qualifier
- WC = Wild card
- LL = Lucky loser
- Alt = Alternate
- ITF = ITF entry
- PR = Protected ranking
- SR = Special ranking
- SE = Special exempt
- JE = Junior exempt
- JR = Junior Accelerator Programme entrant
- CO = College Accelerator Programme entrant
- NG = Next Gen Accelerator Program entrant
- w/o = Walkover
- r = Retired
- d = Defaulted

First round
1	(United States) **P Shriver** (Czechoslovakia) **H Suková**	**6**	**6**
(United States) L Bartlett (United States) S Savides	4	1
(Sweden) **C Lindqvist** (Netherlands) **H Witvoet**	**6**	**6**
(Canada) M Drake (United States) J Golder	1	0
4	(Soviet Union) **L Meskhi** (Soviet Union) **N Zvereva**	**6**	**7**
(New Zealand) B Cordwell (New Zealand) J Richardson	2	5
(Australia) D Balestrat (United States) T Mochizuki	3	4
(United States) **P Louie-Harper** (Bulgaria) **M Maleeva**	**6**	**6**
(Japan) E Iida (Japan) A Nishiya	1	5
(United States) **L Antonoplis** (United States) **B Gerken**	**6**	**7**
(Japan) A Kijimuta (Japan) M Yanagi	3	2
3	(United States) **G Fernández** (United States) **R White**	**6**	**6**
(Japan) K Okamoto (Japan) N Sato	5	**6**	3
(United States) **L Bonder** (Australia) **A Minter**	**7**	3	**6**
(United States) P Fendick (United States) A Henricksson	4	**6**	5
2	(Australia) **E Smylie** (Australia) **W Turnbull**	**6**	1	**7**

Quarterfinals
1	(United States) **P Shriver** (Czechoslovakia) **H Suková**	**6**	**6**
(Sweden) C Lindqvist (Netherlands) H Witvoet	4	0
4	(Soviet Union) **L Meskhi** (Soviet Union) **N Zvereva**	**6**	**6**
(United States) P Louie-Harper (Bulgaria) M Maleeva	4	1
(United States) L Antonoplis (United States) B Gerken	2	1
3	(United States) **G Fernández** (United States) **R White**	**6**	**6**
(United States) L Bonder (Australia) A Minter	3	**6**	2
2	(Australia) **E Smylie** (Australia) **W Turnbull**	**6**	0	**6**

Semifinals
1	(United States) **P Shriver** (Czechoslovakia) **H Suková**	5	**6**	**6**
4	(Soviet Union) L Meskhi (Soviet Union) N Zvereva	**7**	3	4
3	(United States) **G Fernández** (United States) **R White**	**6**	**6**
2	(Australia) E Smylie (Australia) W Turnbull	4	4

Final
1	(United States) **Pam Shriver** (Czechoslovakia) **Helena Suková**	4	**6**	**7**
3	(United States) Gigi Fernández (United States) Robin White	**6**	2	6
