= 1985 Pan Pacific Open =

- Date: 9–15 December
- Edition: 13th
- Category: Category 4
- Draw: 28S / 16D
- Prize money: $250,000
- Surface: Carpet / indoor
- Location: Tokyo, Japan

Champions

Singles
- (Bulgaria) Manuela Maleeva

Doubles
- (West Germany) Claudia Kohde-Kilsch (Czechoslovakia) Helena Suková
← 1984 ·	Pan Pacific Open	· 1986 →

The 1985 Pan Pacific Open was a women's tennis tournament played on indoor carpet courts in Tokyo, Japan that was part of the Category 4 tier of the 1985 Virginia Slims World Championship Series. It was the 13th edition of the tournament and was held from 9 December through 15 December 1985. Third-seeded Manuela Maleeva won her second consecutive singles title at the event.

== Finals ==
=== Singles ===
(Bulgaria) Manuela Maleeva defeated (United States) Bonnie Gadusek 7–6, 3–6, 7–5

- It was Maleeva's only singles title of the year and the 6th of her career.

=== Doubles ===
(West Germany) Claudia Kohde-Kilsch / (Czechoslovakia) Helena Suková defeated (Netherlands) Marcella Mesker / (Australia) Elizabeth Smylie 6–0, 6–4
