= 1988 Pan Pacific Open – Singles =

Singles
- 1988 Pan Pacific Open

Final
- Champion: (United States) Pam Shriver
- Runner-up: (Czechoslovakia) Helena Suková
- Score: 7–5, 6–1

Details
- Draw: 28 (4 Q )
- Seeds: 8

Events
Singles	Doubles
← 1987 ·	Pan Pacific Open	· 1989 →

Gabriela Sabatini was the defending champion but did not compete that year.

Pam Shriver won in the final 7–5, 6–1 against Helena Suková.

== Seeds ==
A champion seed is indicated in bold text while text in italics indicates the round in which that seed was eliminated. The top four seeds received a bye to the second round.

1. (United States) **Pam Shriver (champion)**
2. (Bulgaria) Manuela Maleeva (semifinals)
3. (Czechoslovakia) Helena Suková (final)
4. (Soviet Union) Natasha Zvereva (quarterfinals)
5. (Soviet Union) Larisa Savchenko (semifinals)
6. (Sweden) Catarina Lindqvist (first round)
7. (Australia) Anne Minter (quarterfinals)
8. (United States) Patty Fendick (second round)

== Draw ==
=== Key ===
- Q = Qualifier
- WC = Wild card
- LL = Lucky loser
- Alt = Alternate
- ITF = ITF entry
- PR = Protected ranking
- SR = Special ranking
- SE = Special exempt
- JE = Junior exempt
- JR = Junior Accelerator Programme entrant
- CO = College Accelerator Programme entrant
- NG = Next Gen Accelerator Program entrant
- w/o = Walkover
- r = Retired
- d = Defaulted

=== Final ===
Final
1	(United States) **Pam Shriver**	**7**	**6**
3	(Czechoslovakia) Helena Suková	5	1

=== Section 1 ===
First round
(Soviet Union) **L Meskhi**	**6**	**6**
(Netherlands) B Schultz	3	1
(United States) **P Louie-Harper**	**7**	**6**
(Australia) E Smylie	6	2
Q	(Japan) N Miyagi	2	3
8	(United States) **P Fendick**	**6**	**6**
(Japan) K Okamoto	**7**	2	5
(United States) **A Henricksson**	5	**6**	**7**
(United States) **L Bonder**	**6**	**7**
(Netherlands) H Witvoet	1	5
(United States) R White	**6**	1	4
5	(Soviet Union) **L Savchenko**	1	**6**	**6**

Second round
1	(United States) **P Shriver**	**6**	**6**
(Soviet Union) L Meskhi	0	2
(United States) **P Louie-Harper**	3	**6**	**6**
8	(United States) P Fendick	**6**	2	3
4	(Soviet Union) **N Zvereva**	**6**	**7**
(United States) A Henricksson	3	5
(United States) L Bonder	**6**	3	5
5	(Soviet Union) **L Savchenko**	2	**6**	**7**

Quarterfinals
1	(United States) **P Shriver**	**6**	**7**
(United States) P Louie-Harper	1	5
4	(Soviet Union) N Zvereva	6	5
5	(Soviet Union) **L Savchenko**	**7**	**7**

Semifinals
1	(United States) **P Shriver**	6	**6**	**6**
5	(Soviet Union) L Savchenko	**7**	2	4

=== Section 2 ===
First round
6	(Sweden) C Lindqvist	3	**6**	0
(Australia) **D Balestrat**	**6**	1	**6**
(Japan) **E Inoue**	**6**	**7**
Q	(Japan) F Osawa	2	5
Q	(United States) T Mochizuki	4	3
(United States) **B Gerken**	**6**	**6**
7	(Australia) **A Minter**	**6**	3	**7**
LL	(United States) L Antonoplis	0	**6**	6
(Australia) W Turnbull	2	0
(United States) **G Fernández**	**6**	**6**
Q	(Japan) R Hiraki	6	0
(Japan) **A Kijimuta**	**7**	**6**

Second round
(Australia) D Balestrat	1	2
(Japan) **E Inoue**	**6**	**6**
(United States) B Gerken	**6**	6	2
3	(Czechoslovakia) **H Suková**	3	**7**	**6**
7	(Australia) **A Minter**	1	**6**	**6**
(United States) G Fernández	**6**	4	2
(Japan) A Kijimuta	**7**	4	0
2	(Bulgaria) **M Maleeva**	6	**6**	**6**

Quarterfinals
(Japan) E Inoue	4	5
3	(Czechoslovakia) **H Suková**	**6**	**7**
7	(Australia) A Minter	4	2
2	(Bulgaria) **M Maleeva**	**6**	**6**

Semifinals
3	(Czechoslovakia) **H Suková**	**7**	4	**6**
2	(Bulgaria) M Maleeva	6	**6**	3
