= 1984 Pan Pacific Open =

- Date: 10–16 December
- Edition: 12th
- Category: Category 4
- Draw: 28S / 16D
- Prize money: $250,000
- Surface: Carpet / indoor
- Location: Tokyo, Japan

Champions

Singles
- (Bulgaria) Manuela Maleeva

Doubles
- (West Germany) Claudia Kohde-Kilsch / (Czechoslovakia) Helena Suková
← 1983 ·	Pan Pacific Open	· 1985 →

The 1984 Pan Pacific Open was a women's tennis tournament played on indoor carpet courts in Tokyo, Japan that was part of the Category 4 tier of the 1984 Virginia Slims World Championship Series. The tournament was held from 10 December through 16 December 1984. Second-seeded Manuela Maleeva won the singles title and earned $40,000 first-prize money.

== Finals ==
=== Singles ===
(Bulgaria) Manuela Maleeva defeated (West Germany) Claudia Kohde-Kilsch 3–6, 6–3, 6–4

- It was Maleeva's 5th singles title of the year and of her career.

=== Doubles ===
(West Germany) Claudia Kohde-Kilsch / (Czechoslovakia) Helena Suková defeated (Australia) Elizabeth Smylie / (France) Catherine Tanvier 6–4, 6–1

- It was Kohde-Kilsch's 6th title of the year and the 12th of her career. It was Suková 5th title of the year and the 6th of her career.
