= Kazuko Ito (tennis) =

Japanese tennis player (born 1963)

Kazuko Ito 伊藤 和子
- Country (sports): Japan
- Born: 21 August 1963 (age 61)
- Prize money: $19,381

Singles
- Highest ranking: No. 325 (26 October 1987)

Doubles
- Highest ranking: No. 158 (24 April 1989)

Grand Slam doubles results
- Australian Open: 1R (1988, 1989, 1990)
- French Open: 1R (1989)
Medal record
Asian Games
Silver medal – second place	1982 New Delhi	Women's Doubles
Bronze medal – third place	1982 New Delhi	Women's Team

Kazuko Ito (Japanese: 伊藤 和子, born 21 August 1963) is a Japanese former professional tennis player.

Ito represented Japan at the 1982 Asian Games in New Delhi and won two medals, a women's doubles silver and a bronze in the team event.

As a professional player she had the biggest impact in doubles, with three main draw appearances at the Australian Open and one at the French Open. She was a doubles quarter-finalist at the 1989 Pan Pacific Open.

== ITF finals ==
=== Doubles (3–1) ===
Outcome	No.	Date	Tournament	Surface	Partner	Opponents	Score
Winner	1.	11 November 1984	Hiroshima, Japan	Hard	(Japan) Fumiko Furuhashi	(United States) Cheryl Jones (Netherlands) Judith Warringa	2–6, 6–2, 7–5
Runner-up	1.	24 November 1986	Kyoto, Japan	Hard	(Japan) Junko Kimura	(Indonesia) Yayuk Basuki (Indonesia) Suzanna Wibowo	3–6, 3–6
Winner	2.	17 October 1988	Kuroshio, Japan	Hard	(Japan) Yasuyo Kajita	(Japan) Ayako Hirose (Japan) Shiho Okada	7–5, 6–4
Winner	3.	14 November 1988	Kyoto, Japan	Hard	(Japan) Yasuyo Kajita	(Japan) Kimiko Date (Japan) Yuko Hosoki	6–4, 7–5
