= 1990 Toray Pan Pacific Open =

- Date: 29 January – 4 February
- Edition: 7th
- Category: Tier II
- Draw: 28S / 16D
- Prize money: $350,000
- Surface: Carpet / indoor
- Location: Shibuya, Tokyo, Japan
- Venue: Yoyogi National Gymnasium

Champions

Singles
- (Germany) Steffi Graf

Doubles
- (United States) Gigi Fernández / (Australia) Elizabeth Smylie
← 1989 ·	Pan Pacific Open	· 1991 →

The 1990 Toray Pan Pacific Open was a women's tennis tournament played on indoor carpet courts at the Yoyogi National Gymnasium in Tokyo, Japan that was part of the Tier II Series of the 1990 WTA Tour. It was the seventh edition of the Pan Pacific Open and took place from 29 January through 4 February 1990. First-seeded Steffi Graf won the singles title and earned $70,000 first-prize money as well as 300 ranking points.

== Finals ==
=== Singles ===
(Germany) Steffi Graf defeated (Spain) Arantxa Sánchez Vicario 6–1, 6–2

- It was Graf's 2nd singles title of the year and the 46th of her career.

=== Doubles ===
(United States) Gigi Fernández / (Australia) Elizabeth Smylie defeated (Australia) Jo-Anne Faull / (Australia) Rachel McQuillan 6–2, 6–2
