= 1988 Pan Pacific Open =

- Date: 25 April – 1 May
- Edition: 16th
- Category: Category 4
- Draw: 32S / 16D
- Prize money: $250,000
- Surface: Carpet / indoor
- Location: Tokyo, Japan
- Venue: Tokyo Metropolitan Gymnasium

Champions

Singles
- (United States) Pam Shriver

Doubles
- (United States) Pam Shriver / (Czechoslovakia) Helena Suková
← 1987 ·	Pan Pacific Open	· 1989 →

The 1988 Pan Pacific Open was a women's tennis tournament played on indoor carpet courts at the Tokyo Metropolitan Gymnasium in Tokyo in Japan and was part of the Category 4 tier of the 1988 WTA Tour. It was the 16th edition of the tournament and ran from 25 April through 1 May 1988. First-seeded Pam Shriver won the singles title and earned $50,000 first-prize money.

== Finals ==
=== Singles ===
(United States) Pam Shriver defeated (Czechoslovakia) Helena Suková 7–5, 6–1

- It was Shriver's 2nd singles title of the year and the 20th of her career.

=== Doubles ===
(United States) Pam Shriver / (Czechoslovakia) Helena Suková defeated (United States) Gigi Fernández / (United States) Robin White 4–6, 6–2, 7–6^{(7–5)}

- It was Shriver's 7th title of the year and the 110th of her career. It was Suková's 2nd title of the year and the 30th of her career.
