= 1992 Porsche Tennis Grand Prix – Doubles =

Doubles
- 1992 Porsche Tennis Grand Prix

Final
- Champions: (Spain) Arantxa Sánchez Vicario (Czechoslovakia) Helena Suková
- Runners-up: (United States) Pam Shriver (Commonwealth of Independent States) Natasha Zvereva
- Score: 6–4, 7–5

Details
- Draw: 16 (1WC/1Q)
- Seeds: 4

Events
Singles	Doubles
← 1991 ·	Women's Stuttgart Open	· 1993 →

Martina Navratilova and Jana Novotná were the defending champions, but none competed this year. Navratilova chose to focus only on the singles tournament, eventually winning that title.

Arantxa Sánchez Vicario and Helena Suková won the title by defeating Pam Shriver and Natasha Zvereva 6–4, 7–5 in the final.

== Seeds ==
1. (Spain) Arantxa Sánchez Vicario / (Czechoslovakia) Helena Suková (champions)
2. (United States) Pam Shriver / (Commonwealth of Independent States) Natasha Zvereva (final)
3. (United States) Patty Fendick / (Czechoslovakia) Andrea Strnadová (semifinals)
4. (Germany) Claudia Kohde-Kilsch / (United States) Stephanie Rehe (quarterfinals)

== Draw ==
=== Key ===
- Q = Qualifier
- WC = Wild card
- LL = Lucky loser
- Alt = Alternate
- ITF = ITF entry
- PR = Protected ranking
- SR = Special ranking
- SE = Special exempt
- JE = Junior exempt
- JR = Junior Accelerator Programme entrant
- CO = College Accelerator Programme entrant
- NG = Next Gen Accelerator Program entrant
- w/o = Walkover
- r = Retired
- d = Defaulted

=== Draw ===
First round
1	(Spain) A Sánchez Vicario (Czechoslovakia) H Suková	6	6
(Germany) A Huber (South Africa) E Reinach	1	0
(France) P Paradis-Mangon (France) S Testud	3	6	5
(Commonwealth of Independent States) N Medevedeva (Czechoslovakia) R Zrubáková	6	1	7
4	(Germany) C Kohde-Kilsch (United States) S Rehe	6	6
(Germany) K Kschwendt (Germany) B Rittner	3	3
(France) N Tauziat (Austria) J Wiesner	6	4	6^{3}
(United States) L McNeil (Australia) E Smylie	3	6	7^{7}
(Germany) C Porwik (Netherlands) B Schultz	6	6^{5}	6
(United States) MJ Fernández (Germany) E Pfaff	4	7^{7}	0
(United States) K Adams (France) I Demongeot	7	3	4
3	(United States) P Fendick (Czechoslovakia) A Strnadová	5	6	6
WC	(Germany) R Kochta (Germany) V Martinek	2	2
Q	(United States) A Henricksson (Hungary) A Temesvári-Trunkos	6	6
(Peru) L Gildemeister (Czechoslovakia) K Habšudová	3	2
2	(United States) P Shriver (Commonwealth of Independent States) N Zvereva	6	6

Quarterfinals
1	(Spain) A Sánchez Vicario (Czechoslovakia) H Suková	6	6
(Commonwealth of Independent States) N Medevedeva (Czechoslovakia) R Zrubáková	2	4
4	(Germany) C Kohde-Kilsch (United States) S Rehe	6^{5}	6^{3}
(United States) L McNeil (Australia) E Smylie	7^{7}	7^{7}
(Germany) C Porwik (Netherlands) B Schultz	2	4
3	(United States) P Fendick (Czechoslovakia) A Strnadová	6	6
Q	(United States) A Henricksson (Hungary) A Temesvári-Trunkos	1	3
2	(United States) P Shriver (Commonwealth of Independent States) N Zvereva	6	6

Semifinals
1	(Spain) A Sánchez Vicario (Czechoslovakia) H Suková	6	6
(United States) L McNeil (Australia) E Smylie	3	3
3	(United States) P Fendick (Czechoslovakia) A Strnadová	2	0
2	(United States) P Shriver (Commonwealth of Independent States) N Zvereva	6	6

Final
1	(Spain) A Sánchez Vicario (Czechoslovakia) H Suková	6	7
2	(United States) P Shriver (Commonwealth of Independent States) N Zvereva	4	5
