= 1986 Pan Pacific Open =

- Date: 8–14 September
- Edition: 14th
- Category: Category 4
- Draw: 32S / 16D
- Prize money: $250,000
- Surface: Carpet / indoor
- Location: Tokyo, Japan
- Venue: Tokyo Metropolitan Gymnasium

Champions

Singles
- (West Germany) Steffi Graf

Doubles
- (West Germany) Bettina Bunge (West Germany) Steffi Graf
← 1985 ·	Pan Pacific Open	· 1987 →

The 1986 Pan Pacific Open was a women's tennis tournament played on indoor carpet courts at the Tokyo Metropolitan Gymnasium in Tokyo in Japan and was part of the Category 4 tier of the 1986 WTA Tour. It was the 14th edition of the tournament and ran from 8 September through 14 September 1986. First-seeded Steffi Graf won the singles title.

== Finals ==
=== Singles ===
(West Germany) Steffi Graf defeated (Bulgaria) Manuela Maleeva 6–4, 6–2

- It was Graf's 6th singles title of the year and of her career.

=== Doubles ===
(West Germany) Bettina Bunge / (West Germany) Steffi Graf defeated (Bulgaria) Katerina Maleeva / (Bulgaria) Manuela Maleeva 6–1, 6–7^{(4–7)}, 6–2
