= 1994 Asia Women's Tennis Open – Singles =

Singles
- 1994 Asia Women's Tennis Open
- 1993 Champion: (Czech Republic) Jana Novotná

Final
- Champion: (Switzerland) Manuela Maleeva-Fragniere
- Runner-up: (Croatia) Iva Majoli
- Score: 6–1, 4–6, 7–5

Details
- Draw: 32
- Seeds: 8

Events
Singles	Doubles
- Asian Open

Jana Novotná was the defending champion but did not compete that year.

Manuela Maleeva-Fragniere won in the final 6–1, 4–6, 7–5 against Iva Majoli.

== Seeds ==
A champion seed is indicated in bold text while text in italics indicates the round in which that seed was eliminated.

1. (Switzerland) **Manuela Maleeva-Fragniere (champion)**
2. (Latvia) Larisa Neiland (first round)
3. (Japan) Mana Endo (semifinals)
4. (United States) Pam Shriver (first round, retired)
5. (Croatia) Iva Majoli (final)
6. (France) Alexandra Fusai (first round)
7. (United States) ~~Kathy Rinaldi-Stunkel~~ (withdrew)
8. (Netherlands) Kristie Boogert (quarterfinals)

== Draw ==
Key

- Q = Qualifier
- WC = Wild card
- LL = Lucky loser
- Alt = Alternate
- ITF = ITF entry
- PR = Protected ranking
- SR = Special ranking
- SE = Special exempt
- JE = Junior exempt
- JR = Junior Accelerator Programme entrant
- CO = College Accelerator Programme entrant
- NG = Next Gen Accelerator Program entrant
- w/o = Walkover
- r = Retired
- d = Defaulted

First round
1	(Switzerland) **M Maleeva-Fragniere**	**6**	**6**
Q	(United States) A Leand	1	2
(Australia) **R Stubbs**	**6**	**6**
Q	(Canada) J Nejedly	3	4
(Japan) **K Nagatsuka**	**6**	1	**6**
Q	(Germany) A Kerek	3	**6**	3
(Japan) **Y Kamio**	**2**
LL	(Japan) K Shibata	1	r
3	(Japan) **M Endo**	**6**	**6**
WC	(Japan) M Kidowaki	2	3
(United States) **A Henricksson**	6	**6**	**6**
(Czech Republic) A Strnadová	**7**	3	4
(Japan) **M Miyauchi**	**6**	**6**
(Japan) E Iida	2	2
(Germany) **M Zivec-Skulj**	**7**	**6**
6	(France) A Fusai	6	2
8	(Netherlands) **K Boogert**	**6**	**6**
(Australia) L Field	0	0
(Australia) **E Smylie**	**6**	5	**6**
(Japan) R Hiraki	1	**7**	3
WC	(Japan) N Miyagi	4	1
(Japan) **A Sugiyama**	**6**	**6**
(China) **F Li**	**6**
4	(United States) P Shriver	3	r
5	(Croatia) **I Majoli**	**6**	**6**
(France) A Dechaume-Balleret	2	1
LL	(Netherlands) **C Bakkum**	**6**	**6**
LL	(Australia) D Jones	3	1
LL	(Japan) **Y Yoshida**	**6**	**7**
(Germany) S Meier	1	5
Q	(South Korea) **S-H Park**	**6**	**7**
2	(Latvia) L Neiland	1	6

Second round
1	(Switzerland) **M Maleeva-Fragniere**	**6**	**6**
(Australia) R Stubbs	1	2
(Japan) K Nagatsuka	4	3
(Japan) **Y Kamio**	**6**	**6**
3	(Japan) **M Endo**	**6**	**6**
(United States) A Henricksson	0	1
(Japan) **M Miyauchi**	**6**	**6**
(Germany) M Zivec-Skulj	0	0
8	(Netherlands) **K Boogert**	**6**	**6**
(Australia) E Smylie	3	0
(Japan) **A Sugiyama**	5	**6**	**6**
(China) F Li	**7**	4	1
5	(Croatia) **I Majoli**	**6**	**6**
LL	(Netherlands) C Bakkum	3	1
LL	(Japan) Y Yoshida	**6**	2	3
Q	(South Korea) **S-H Park**	2	**6**	**6**

Quarterfinals
1	(Switzerland) **M Maleeva-Fragniere**	**6**	**6**
(Japan) Y Kamio	1	4
3	(Japan) **M Endo**	**6**	**6**
(Japan) M Miyauchi	3	2
8	(Netherlands) K Boogert	3	3
(Japan) **A Sugiyama**	**6**	**6**
5	(Croatia) **I Majoli**	**7**	6	**6**
Q	(South Korea) S-H Park	5	**7**	2

Semifinals
1	(Switzerland) **M Maleeva-Fragniere**	**6**	**6**
3	(Japan) M Endo	0	3
(Japan) A Sugiyama	5	5
5	(Croatia) **I Majoli**	**7**	**7**

Final
1	(Switzerland) **M Maleeva-Fragniere**	**6**	4	**7**
5	(Croatia) Iva Majoli	1	**6**	5
