= 1992 Mizuno World Ladies – Doubles =

Doubles
- 1992 Mizuno World Ladies

Final
- Champions: (Australia) Rennae Stubbs (Czechoslovakia) Helena Suková
- Runners-up: (United States) Sandy Collins (Australia) Rachel McQuillan
- Score: 3–6, 6–4, 7–5

Details
- Draw: 16 (1Q)
- Seeds: 4

Events
Singles	Doubles
Asian Open	· 1993 →

In the inaugural edition of the tournament, Rennae Stubbs and Helena Suková won the title by defeating Sandy Collins and Rachel McQuillan 3–6, 6–4, 7–5 in the final.

== Seeds ==
1. (United States) Sandy Collins / (Australia) Rachel McQuillan (final)
2. (Japan) Kimiko Date / (United States) Stephanie Rehe (semifinals)
3. (Australia) Rennae Stubbs / (Czechoslovakia) Helena Suková (champions)
4. (United States) Carrie Cunningham / (Peru) Laura Gildemeister (first round)

== Draw ==
=== Key ===
- Q = Qualifier
- WC = Wild card
- LL = Lucky loser
- Alt = Alternate
- ITF = ITF entry
- PR = Protected ranking
- SR = Special ranking
- SE = Special exempt
- JE = Junior exempt
- JR = Junior Accelerator Programme entrant
- CO = College Accelerator Programme entrant
- NG = Next Gen Accelerator Program entrant
- w/o = Walkover
- r = Retired
- d = Defaulted

=== Draw ===
First round
1	(United States) S Collins (Australia) R McQuillan	6	6
(United States) A Henricksson (United States) H Ludloff	2	4
(Japan) M Donoshiro (Japan) A Sugiyama	6	7
(United States) J Emmons (Australia) A Minter	4	5
4	(United States) C Cunningham (Peru) L Gildemeister	7^{10}	2	3
(Indonesia) Y Basuki (Japan) N Miyagi	6^{8}	6	6
(Japan) R Hiraki (Japan) A Nishiya	6	6
(Czechoslovakia) K Habšudová (United States) J Smoller	4	3
(Commonwealth of Independent States) E Brioukhovets (Czechoslovakia) E Švíglerová	4	2
(Japan) E Iida (Japan) M Miyauchi	6	6
(Japan) Y Kamio (United States) Lynn Nabors	2	1
3	(Australia) R Stubbs (Czechoslovakia) H Suková	6	6
Q	(United States) J Santrock (Japan) T Takagi	2	4
(Japan) A Kijimuta (Japan) N Sawamatsu	6	6
(Japan) Y Koizumi (Japan) M Mizokuchi	2	2
2	(Japan) K Date (United States) S Rehe	6	6

Quarterfinals
1	(United States) S Collins (Australia) R McQuillan	7^{8}	6
(Japan) M Donoshiro (Japan) A Sugiyama	6^{6}	0
(Indonesia) Y Basuki (Japan) N Miyagi	6	6
(Japan) R Hiraki (Japan) A Nishiya	3	4
(Japan) E Iida (Japan) M Miyauchi	0	1
3	(Australia) R Stubbs (Czechoslovakia) H Suková	6	6
(Japan) A Kijimuta (Japan) N Sawamatsu	5	1
2	(Japan) K Date (United States) S Rehe	7	6

Semifinals
1	(United States) S Collins (Australia) R McQuillan	4	7	6
(Indonesia) Y Basuki (Japan) N Miyagi	6	5	3
3	(Australia) R Stubbs (Czechoslovakia) H Suková	7^{7}	6^{4}	6
2	(Japan) K Date (United States) S Rehe	6^{5}	7^{7}	3

Final
1	(United States) S Collins (Australia) R McQuillan	6	4	5
3	(Australia) R Stubbs (Czechoslovakia) H Suková	3	6	7
