= 1993 World Ladies in Osaka =

- Date: February 9–14
- Edition: 2nd
- Category: Tier III
- Draw: 32S / 16D
- Prize money: $150,000
- Surface: Carpet / indoor
- Location: Osaka, Japan
- Venue: Amagasaki Memorial Sports Centre

Champions

Singles
- (Czechoslovakia) Jana Novotná

Doubles
- (Latvia) Larisa Neiland / (Czechoslovakia) Jana Novotná
← 1992 ·	Asian Open	· 1994 →

The 1993 World Ladies in Osaka was a women's tennis tournament played on indoor carpet courts at the Amagasaki Memorial Sports Centre in Osaka in Japan that was part of Tier III of the 1993 WTA Tour. It was the second edition of the tournament and was held from February 9 through February 14, 1993. First-seeded Jana Novotná won the singles title and earned $27,000 first-prize money.

== Finals ==
=== Singles ===
(Czechoslovakia) Jana Novotná defeated (Japan) Kimiko Date 6–3, 6–2

- It was Novotná's 1st singles title of the year and the 6th of her career.

=== Doubles ===
(Latvia) Larisa Neiland / (Czechoslovakia) Jana Novotná defeated (Bulgaria) Magdalena Maleeva / (Switzerland) Manuela Maleeva-Fragnière 6–1, 6–3

- It was Neiland' 2nd doubles title of the year and the 32nd of her career. It was Novotná's 1st doubles title of the year and the 39th of her career.
