= 1996 Wilkinson Lady Championships – Singles =

Singles
- 1996 Wilkinson Lady Championships

Final
- Champion: (Germany) Anke Huber
- Runner-up: (Czech Republic) Helena Suková
- Score: 6–4, 7–6^{(7–2)}

Events
| Singles | Doubles |
| Wilkinson Lady Championships | · 1997 → |

This was the first edition.

Anke Huber won in the final 6–4, 7–6^{(7–2)} against Helena Suková.

== Seeds ==
A champion seed is indicated in bold text while text in italics indicates the round in which that seed was eliminated.

1. (Croatia) Iva Majoli (quarterfinals)
2. (Germany) **Anke Huber (champion)**
3. (Bulgaria) Magdalena Maleeva (first round)
4. (Netherlands) Brenda Schultz-McCarthy (second round)
5. (Austria) Judith Wiesner (semifinals)
6. (Belgium) Sabine Appelmans (second round)
7. (Russia) Elena Likhovtseva (second round)
8. (Czech Republic) Helena Suková (final)

== Draw ==
=== Key ===
- Q = Qualifier
- WC = Wild card
- LL = Lucky loser
- Alt = Alternate
- SE = Special exempt
- PR = Protected ranking
- ITF = ITF entry
- JE = Junior exempt
- w/o = Walkover
- r = Retired
- d = Defaulted
- SR = Special ranking

First round
1 | (Croatia) **I Majoli** | **6** | **6**
(Japan) K Nagatsuka | 2 | 4
WC | (France) **A Mauresmo** | **7** | **6**
(France) A Fusai | 5 | 3
(Netherlands) **M Oremans** | 4 | **6** | **6**
(Japan) Y Kamio | **6** | 4 | 2
WC | (Czech Republic) S Kleinová | 4 | 6^{2}
8 | (Czech Republic) **H Suková** | **6** | **7^{7}**
3 | (Bulgaria) M Maleeva | 3 | 3
(Netherlands) **K Boogert** | **6** | **6**
(Germany) C Singer | **6** | 3 | 1
(Japan) **M Endo** | 1 | **6** | **6**
(South Korea) S-H Park | 1 | 6^{9}
(Netherlands) **P Kamstra** | **6** | **7^{11}**
(France) S Testud | 3 | 1
5 | (Austria) **J Wiesner** | **6** | **6**
7 | (Russia) **E Likhovtseva** | 4 | **7** | **6**
(Belgium) L Courtois | **6** | 5 | 0
(Romania) **R Dragomir** | 3 | **7** | **6**
(South Africa) M de Swardt | **6** | 5 | 3
(Russia) E Makarova | 2 | 1
(Latvia) **L Neiland** | **6** | **6**
(Poland) M Grzybowska | 2 | 4
4 | (Netherlands) **B Schultz-McCarthy** | **6** | **6**
6 | (Belgium) **S Appelmans** | **6** | **6**
(Canada) P Hy-Boulais | 3 | 2
(Belgium) E Callens | **6** | 2 | 1
(Belgium) **D Van Roost** | 4 | **6** | **6**
(Italy) **R Grande** | 6^{7} | **6** | **6**
(Germany) B Rittner | **7^{9}** | 3 | 4
(Japan) N Kijimuta | **7** | 4 | 3
2 | (Germany) **A Huber** | 5 | **6** | **6**

Second round
1 | (Croatia) **I Majoli** | **6** | **6**
WC | (France) A Mauresmo | 4 | 2
(Netherlands) M Oremans | **6** | 0 | 2
8 | (Czech Republic) **H Suková** | 3 | **6** | **6**
(Netherlands) **K Boogert** | **6** | **6**
(Japan) M Endo | 2 | 4
(Netherlands) P Kamstra | 3 | 4
5 | (Austria) **J Wiesner** | **6** | **6**
7 | (Russia) E Likhovtseva | **6** | 6^{5} | 2
(Romania) **R Dragomir** | 4 | **7^{7}** | **6**
(Latvia) **L Neiland** | **6** | 6^{5} | **6**
4 | (Netherlands) B Schultz-McCarthy | 4 | **7^{7}** | 1
6 | (Belgium) S Appelmans | 4 | 2
(Belgium) **D Van Roost** | **6** | **6**
(Italy) R Grande | 5 | 5
2 | (Germany) **A Huber** | **7** | **7**

Quarterfinals
1 | (Croatia) I Majoli | 1 | 1
8 | (Czech Republic) **H Suková** | **6** | **6**
(Netherlands) K Boogert | 3 | 3
5 | (Austria) **J Wiesner** | **6** | **6**
(Romania) **R Dragomir** | 1 | **6** | **7**
(Latvia) L Neiland | **6** | 3 | 5
(Belgium) D Van Roost | **6** | 3 | 6^{3}
2 | (Germany) **A Huber** | 3 | **6** | **7^{7}**

Semifinals
8 | (Czech Republic) **H Suková** | 5 | **6** | **6**
5 | (Austria) J Wiesner | **7** | 4 | 3
(Romania) R Dragomir | **7^{7}** | 1 | 4
2 | (Germany) **A Huber** | 6^{1} | **6** | **6**

Final
8 | (Czech Republic) Helena Suková | 4 | 6^{2}
2 | (Germany) **Anke Huber** | **6** | **7^{7}**
