= 1994 Asia Women's Tennis Open – Doubles =

Doubles
- 1994 Asia Women’s Tennis Open
- 1993 Champions: (Latvia) Larisa Neiland (Czech Republic) Jana Novotná

Final
- Champions: (Latvia) Larisa Neiland (Australia) Rennae Stubbs
- Runners-up: (United States) Pam Shriver (Australia) Elizabeth Smylie
- Score: 6–4, 6–7, 7–5

Details
- Draw: 16
- Seeds: 4

Events
Singles	Doubles
← 1993 ·	Asian Open

Larisa Neiland and Jana Novotná were the defending champions but only Neiland competed that year with Rennae Stubbs.

Neiland and Stubbs won in the final 6–4, 6–7, 7–5 against Pam Shriver and Elizabeth Smylie.

== Seeds ==
Champion seeds are indicated in bold text while text in italics indicates the round in which those seeds were eliminated.

1. (Latvia) **Larisa Neiland** / (Australia) **Rennae Stubbs (champions)**
2. (United States) Pam Shriver / (Australia) Elizabeth Smylie (final)
3. (Japan) Rika Hiraki / (China) Fang Li (first round)
4. (Japan) Ei Iida / (Japan) Maya Kidowaki (first round)

== Draw ==
=== Key ===
- Q = Qualifier
- WC = Wild card
- LL = Lucky loser
- Alt = Alternate
- SE = Special exempt
- PR = Protected ranking
- ITF = ITF entry
- JE = Junior exempt
- w/o = Walkover
- r = Retired
- d = Defaulted
- SR = Special ranking

First round
1	(Latvia) **L Neiland** (Australia) **R Stubbs**	1	**6**	**6**
(Japan) Y Kamio (Japan) K Nagatsuka	**6**	0	3
(United States) A Leand (Japan) H Nagano	2	3
(United States) **S Collins** (South Africa) **M de Swardt**	**6**	**6**
4	(Japan) E Iida (Japan) M Kidowaki	2	**6**	5
WC	(Japan) **M Endo** (Japan) **N Sawamatsu**	**6**	3	**7**
Q	(Japan) H Mochizuki (Japan) Y Tanaka	4	1
(Netherlands) **C Bakkum** (Croatia) **I Majoli**	**6**	**6**
(Germany) A Kerek (Germany) M Zivec-Skulj	2	1
(Australia) **K-A Guse** (United Kingdom) **V Lake**	**6**	**6**
(Australia) **L Field** (United States) **A Henricksson**	**6**	**6**
3	(Japan) R Hiraki (China) F Li	4	4
(South Korea) S-H Park (Japan) A Sugiyama	**6**	2	6
(France) **A Dechaume-Balleret** (France) **A Fusai**	4	**6**	**7**
(Australia) D Jones (Germany) S Meier	3	1
2	(United States) **P Shriver** (Australia) **E Smylie**	**6**	**6**

Quarterfinals
1	(Latvia) **L Neiland** (Australia) **R Stubbs**	**6**	**6**
(United States) S Collins (South Africa) M de Swardt	2	2
WC	(Japan) **M Endo** (Japan) **N Sawamatsu**	**6**	**6**
(Netherlands) C Bakkum (Croatia) I Majoli	0	3
(Australia) **K-A Guse** (United Kingdom) **V Lake**	**6**	6	**6**
(Australia) L Field (United States) A Henricksson	0	**7**	1
(France) A Dechaume-Balleret (France) A Fusai	2	1
2	(United States) **P Shriver** (Australia) **E Smylie**	**6**	**6**

Semifinals
1	(Latvia) **L Neiland** (Australia) **R Stubbs**	**6**	**7**
WC	(Japan) M Endo (Japan) N Sawamatsu	2	6
(Australia) K-A Guse (United Kingdom) V Lake	2	4
2	(United States) **P Shriver** (Australia) **E Smylie**	**6**	**6**

Final
1	(Latvia) **Larisa Neiland** (Australia) **Rennae Stubbs**	**6**	6	**7**
2	(United States) Pam Shriver (Australia) Elizabeth Smylie	4	**7**	5
