= 1989 Toray Pan Pacific Open =

Tennis tournament

- Date: January 31 – February 5
- Edition: 17th
- Category: Category 4
- Draw: 28S / 16D
- Prize money: $250,000
- Surface: Carpet / indoor
- Location: Tokyo, Japan
- Venue: Tokyo Metropolitan Gymnasium

Champions

Singles
- (United States) Martina Navratilova

Doubles
- (United States) Katrina Adams / (United States) Zina Garrison
← 1988 ·	Pan Pacific Open	· 1990 →

The 1989 Toray Pan Pacific Open was a women's tennis tournament played on indoor carpet courts at the Tokyo Metropolitan Gymnasium in Tokyo in Japan and was part of the Category 4 tier of the 1989 WTA Tour. The tournament was held from January 31 through February 5, 1989. First-seeded Martina Navratilova won the singles title.

== Finals ==
=== Singles ===
(United States) Martina Navratilova defeated (United States) Lori McNeil 6–7^{(3–7)}, 6–3, 7–6^{(7–5)}

- It was Navratilova's 2nd singles title of the year and the 140th of her career.

=== Doubles ===
(United States) Katrina Adams / (United States) Zina Garrison defeated (United States) Mary Joe Fernández / (West Germany) Claudia Kohde-Kilsch 6–3, 3–6, 7–6^{(7–5)}

- It was Adams' 1st title of the year and the 5th of her career. It was Garrison's 1st title of the year and the 18th of her career.
