= 1996 Wilkinson Lady Championships – Doubles =

Doubles
- 1996 Wilkinson Lady Championships

Final
- Champions: (Latvia) Larisa Neiland (Netherlands) Brenda Schultz-McCarthy
- Runners-up: (Netherlands) Kristie Boogert (Czech Republic) Helena Suková
- Score: 6–4, 7–6 (9–7)

Events
Singles	Doubles
Wilkinson Lady Championships	· 1997 →

Larisa Neiland and Brenda Schultz-McCarthy won in the final 6–4, 7–6 (9–7) against Kristie Boogert and Helena Suková.

== Seeds ==
Champion seeds are indicated in bold text while text in italics indicates the round in which those seeds were eliminated.

1. (Latvia) **Larisa Neiland** / (Netherlands) **Brenda Schultz-McCarthy (champions)**
2. (Netherlands) Kristie Boogert / (Czech Republic) Helena Suková (final)
3. (France) Alexia Dechaume-Balleret / (France) Sandrine Testud (semifinals)
4. (Belgium) Els Callens / (Belgium) Laurence Courtois (semifinals)

== Draw ==
=== Key ===
- Q = Qualifier
- WC = Wild card
- LL = Lucky loser
- Alt = Alternate
- SE = Special exempt
- PR = Protected ranking
- ITF = ITF entry
- JE = Junior exempt
- w/o = Walkover
- r = Retired
- d = Defaulted
- SR = Special ranking

First round
1	(Latvia) **L Neiland** (Netherlands) **B Schultz-McCarthy**	**6**	**7**
(France) A Fusai (Canada) P Hy-Boulais	1	5
(Belgium) **S Appelmans** (Netherlands) **M Oremans**	**6**	**6**
(Czech Republic) S Kleinová (France) A Mauresmo	3	2
4	(Belgium) **E Callens** (Belgium) **L Courtois**	3	**7^{7}**	**6**
(Netherlands) A Mikkers (Netherlands) H van Aalderen	**6**	6^{4}	1
(Austria) D Leupold (Netherlands) A Snijders	1	5
(Germany) **B Rittner** (Germany) **C Singer**	**6**	**7**
(Romania) **R Dragomir** (Poland) **M Grzybowska**	**6**	**6**
(Netherlands) M Bruens (Netherlands) M Savelkouls	4	4
(Netherlands) P Kamstra (Netherlands) M Koutstaal	4	3
3	(France) **A Dechaume-Balleret** (France) **S Testud**	**6**	**6**
(Japan) K Nagatsuka (South Korea) S-H Park	6^{4}	2
(Japan) **N Kijimuta** (Croatia) **I Majoli**	**7^{7}**	**6**
(Italy) R Grande (Russia) E Likhovtseva	3	2
2	(Netherlands) **K Boogert** (Czech Republic) **H Suková**	**6**	**6**

Quarterfinals
1	(Latvia) **L Neiland** (Netherlands) **B Schultz-McCarthy**	**6**	**6**
(Belgium) S Appelmans (Netherlands) M Oremans	4	4
4	(Belgium) **E Callens** (Belgium) **L Courtois**	**7**	**7^{8}**
(Germany) B Rittner (Germany) C Singer	5	6^{6}
(Romania) R Dragomir (Poland) M Grzybowska	6^{6}	0
3	(France) **A Dechaume-Balleret** (France) **S Testud**	**7^{8}**	**6**
(Japan) N Kijimuta (Croatia) I Majoli	4	0
2	(Netherlands) **K Boogert** (Czech Republic) **H Suková**	**6**	**6**

Semifinals
1	(Latvia) **L Neiland** (Netherlands) **B Schultz-McCarthy**	**6**	**7^{7}**
4	(Belgium) E Callens (Belgium) L Courtois	4	6^{1}
3	(France) A Dechaume-Balleret (France) S Testud	**6**	2	3
2	(Netherlands) **K Boogert** (Czech Republic) **H Suková**	2	**6**	**6**

Final
1	(Latvia) **Larisa Neiland** (Netherlands) **Brenda Schultz-McCarthy**	**6**	**7^{9}**
2	(Netherlands) Kristie Boogert (Czech Republic) Helena Suková	4	6^{7}
