= 1987 Pan Pacific Open =

Tennis tournament in 1987

- Date: 14–20 September
- Edition: 15th
- Category: Category 4
- Draw: 32S / 16D
- Prize money: $250,000
- Surface: Carpet / indoor
- Location: Tokyo, Japan
- Venue: Tokyo Metropolitan Gymnasium

Champions

Singles
- (Argentina) Gabriela Sabatini

Doubles
- (United States) Anne White (United States) Robin White
← 1986 ·	Pan Pacific Open	· 1988 →

The 1987 Pan Pacific Open was a women's tennis tournament played on indoor carpet courts at the Tokyo Metropolitan Gymnasium in Tokyo in Japan and was part of the Category 4 tier of the 1987 WTA Tour. It was the 15th edition of the tournament and ran from 14 September through 20 September 1987. First-seeded Gabriela Sabatini won the singles title and earned $50,000 first-prize money.

== Finals ==
=== Singles ===
(Argentina) Gabriela Sabatini defeated (Bulgaria) Manuela Maleeva 6–4, 7–6^{(8–6)}

- It was Sabatini's 1st singles title of the year and the 3rd of her career.

=== Doubles ===
(United States) Anne White / (United States) Robin White defeated (Bulgaria) Katerina Maleeva / (Bulgaria) Manuela Maleeva 4–6, 6–2, 7–6

- It was Anne White's 2nd title of the year and the 7th of her career. It was Robin White's 2nd title of the year and the 5th of her career.
