= 1991 Pan Pacific Open =

- Date: 29 January – 3 February
- Edition: 8th
- Category: Tier II
- Draw: 28S / 16D
- Prize money: $350,000
- Surface: Carpet / indoor
- Location: Shibuya, Tokyo, Japan
- Venue: Tokyo Metropolitan Gymnasium

Champions

Singles
- (Argentina) Gabriela Sabatini

Doubles
- (United States) Kathy Jordan / (Australia) Elizabeth Smylie
← 1990 ·	Pan Pacific Open	· 1992 →

The 1991 Toray Pan Pacific Open was a women's tennis tournament played on indoor carpet courts at the Tokyo Metropolitan Gymnasium in Tokyo, Japan that was part of the Tier II Series of the 1991 WTA Tour. It was the eighth edition of the Pan Pacific Open and took place from 29 January through 3 February 1991. Fifth-seeded Gabriela Sabatini won the singles title and earned $70,000 first-prize money as well as 300 ranking points.

== Finals ==
=== Singles ===
(Argentina) Gabriela Sabatini defeated (United States) Martina Navratilova 2–6, 6–2, 6–4

- It was Sabatini's 1st singles title of the year and the 16th of her career.

=== Doubles ===
(United States) Kathy Jordan / (Australia) Elizabeth Smylie defeated (United States) Mary Joe Fernández / (United States) Robin White 4–6, 6–0, 6–3
