= 1990 Porsche Tennis Grand Prix =

Tennis tournament

- Date: 15–21 October
- Edition: 13th
- Category: Tier II
- Draw: 32S / 16D
- Prize money: $350,000
- Surface: Carpet / indoor
- Location: Filderstadt, Germany
- Venue: Filderstadt Tennis Centre

Champions

Singles
- (United States) Mary Joe Fernández

Doubles
- (United States) Mary Joe Fernández / (United States) Zina Garrison
- Porsche Tennis Grand Prix

The 1990 Porsche Tennis Grand Prix was a women's tennis tournament played on indoor carpet courts at the Filderstadt Tennis Centre in Filderstadt, Germany and was part of the Tier II of the 1990 WTA Tour. It was the 13th edition of the tournament and was held from 15 October to 21 October 1990. Second-seeded Mary Joe Fernández won the singles title.

== Finals ==
=== Singles ===
(United States) Mary Joe Fernández defeated (Austria) Barbara Paulus 6–1, 6–3

- It was Fernández' 2nd singles title of the year and of her career.

=== Doubles ===
(United States) Mary Joe Fernández / (United States) Zina Garrison defeated (Argentina) Mercedes Paz / (Spain) Arantxa Sánchez Vicario 7–5, 6–3
