= 1992 Porsche Tennis Grand Prix =

- Date: 12–18 October
- Edition: 15th
- Category: Tier II
- Draw: 32S / 16D
- Prize money: $350,000
- Surface: Hard (Greenset) / indoor
- Location: Filderstadt, Germany
- Venue: Filderstadt Tennis Centre

Champions

Singles
- (United States) Martina Navratilova

Doubles
- (Spain) Arantxa Sánchez Vicario (Czechoslovakia) Helena Suková
- Porsche Tennis Grand Prix

The 1992 Porsche Tennis Grand Prix was a women's tennis tournament played on indoor hard courts at the Filderstadt Tennis Centre in Filderstadt, Germany and was part of the Tier II of the 1992 WTA Tour. It was the 15th edition of the tournament and was held from 12 October to 18 October 1992. On her 36th birthday third-seeded Martina Navratilova won the singles title, her sixth at the event, and earned $70,000 first-prize money.

== Finals ==
=== Singles ===
(United States) Martina Navratilova defeated (Argentina) Gabriela Sabatini 7–6^{(7–1)}, 6–3

- It was Navratilova's 4th singles title of the year and the 161st of her career.

=== Doubles ===
(Spain) Arantxa Sánchez Vicario / (Czechoslovakia) Helena Suková defeated (United States) Pam Shriver / (Commonwealth of Independent States) Natasha Zvereva 6–4, 7–5

== Prize money and ranking points ==
Event		W	F	SF	QF	Round of 16	Round of 32
Singles	Prize money	$70,000	$31,500	$15,750	$7,900	$4,000	$2,100
Singles	Points	300	210	135	70	35	18
