= Misumi Miyauchi =

Japanese tennis player (born 1971)

- Full name: Misumi Miyauchi
- Country (sports): Japan
- Born: 6 September 1971 (age 53); Ibaraki, Japan
- Height: 177 cm (5 ft 10 in)
- Prize money: $143,920

Singles
- Highest ranking: No. 115 (19 April 1993)

Grand Slam singles results
- French Open: 1R (1993)

Doubles
- Highest ranking: No. 136 (10 February 1992)

Grand Slam doubles results
- Australian Open: 1R (1993)

Misumi Miyauchi (宮内 美澄, Miyauchi Misumi, born 6 September 1971) is a former professional tennis player from Japan.

== Biography ==
Born in Ibaraki, Miyauchi played on the professional tour in the 1990s and had a best ranking of 115 in the world.

Miyauchi partnered with Ai Sugiyama in the women's doubles at the 1993 Australian Open and featured in the women's singles main draw at the 1993 French Open.

She was a two-time quarter-finalist at the Asian Open, a WTA Tour tournament in Osaka, as well as reaching the quarter-finals of the 1991 Pattaya Open and 1994 Salem Open-Beijing.

Her ITF titles include the $50,000 Gifu tournament in 1998.

== ITF finals ==
Legend
$50,000 tournaments
$25,000 tournaments
$10,000 tournaments

=== Singles (3–3) ===
Result	No.	Date	Tournament	Surface	Opponent	Score
Win	1.	22 October 1988	Kuroshio, Japan	Hard	(Japan) Emiko Sakaguchi	6–4, 6–3
Loss	1.	10 February 1991	Jakarta, Indonesia	Hard	(Indonesia) Yayuk Basuki	2–6, 2–6
Loss	2.	19 July 1992	Vigo, Spain	Clay	(Sweden) Annika Narbe	3–6, 3–6
Loss	3.	5 May 1996	Seoul, South Korea	Clay	(Netherlands) Stephanie Rottier	1–6, 0–6
Win	2.	11 May 1996	Seoul, South Korea	Clay	(Australia) Kerry-Anne Guse	1–6, 6–3, 6–1
Win	3.	3 May 1998	Gifu, Japan	Grass	(South Korea) Park Sung-hee	6–3, 6–4

=== Doubles (1–2) ===
Result	No.	Date	Tournament	Surface	Partner	Opponents	Score
Loss	1.	10 February 1991	Jakarta, Indonesia	Clay	(Japan) Ei Iida	(Australia) Kerry-Anne Guse (Australia) Justine Hodder	6–7, 5–7
Win	1.	24 June 1991	Caltagiron, Italy	Hard	(Italy) Silvia Farina Elia	(France) Alexandra Fusai (France) Olivia Gravereaux	6–7, 6–4, 6–4
Loss	2.	29 May 1995	Sevilla, Spain	Clay	(Japan) Hiroko Mochizuki	(Spain) Marta Cano (Spain) Nuria Montero	7–6^{(4)}, 4–6, 4–6
