= Asian Open (tennis) =

Defunct tennis tournament
- Event name: Mizuno World Ladies Open (1992); World Ladies Open (1993); Asian Open (1994)
- Tour: WTA Tour
- Founded: 1992
- Abolished: 1994
- Editions: 3
- Surface: Carpet / indoors

The Asian Open is a defunct WTA Tour affiliated women's tennis tournament played from 1992 to 1994. It was held at the Amagasaki Memorial Sports Centre in Osaka in Japan and was played on indoor carpet courts.

== Past finals ==
=== Singles ===
Year	Champions	Runners-up	Score
1992	(Czechoslovakia) Helena Suková	(Peru) Laura Gildemeister	6–2, 4–6, 6–1
1993	(Czech Republic) Jana Novotná	(Japan) Kimiko Date	6–3, 6–2
1994	(Switzerland) Manuela Maleeva-Fragnière	(Croatia) Iva Majoli	6–1, 4–6, 7–5

=== Doubles ===
Year	Champions	Runners-up	Score
1992	(Australia) Rennae Stubbs (Czechoslovakia) Helena Suková	(United States) Sandy Collins (Australia) Rachel McQuillan	3–6, 6–4, 7–5
1993	(Czech Republic) Jana Novotná (Latvia) Larisa Savchenko	(Bulgaria) Magdalena Maleeva (Switzerland) Manuela Maleeva-Fragnière	6–1, 6–3
1994	(Latvia) Larisa Savchenko (Australia) Rennae Stubbs	(Australia) Pam Shriver (Australia) Elizabeth Smylie	6–4, 6–7^{(2–7)}, 7–5
