= 1991 WTA Tour =

Women's tennis circuit

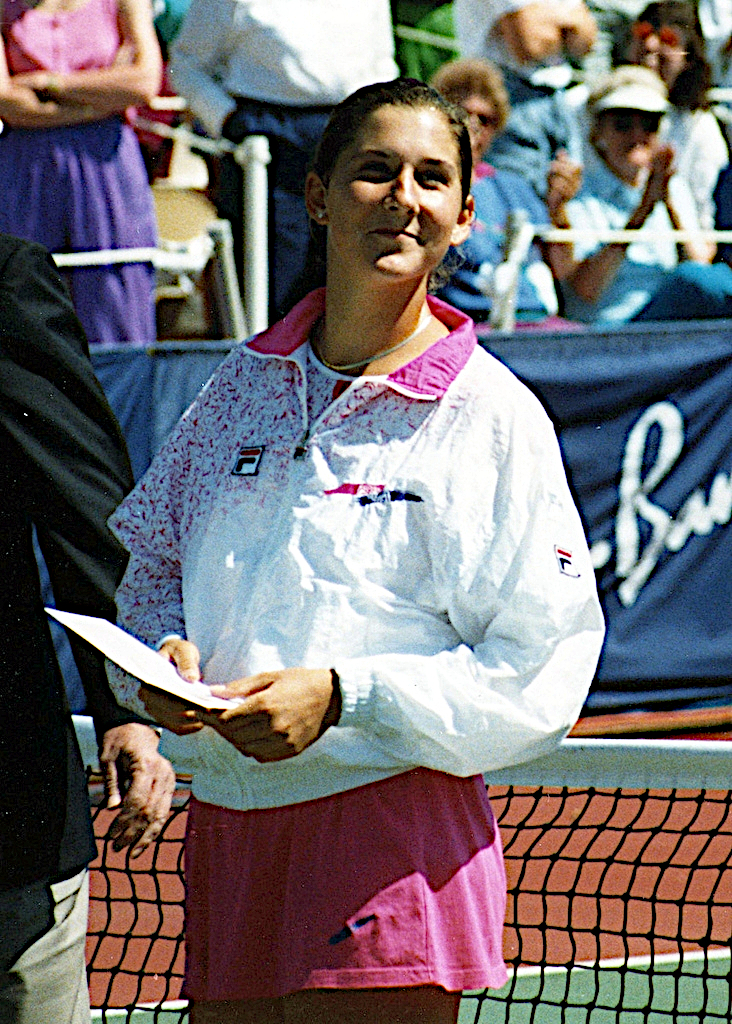
- Monica Seles finished the year as world No. 1 for the first time in her career. She won ten tournaments during the season, including three majors at the Australian Open, the French Open, and the US Open, as well as the WTA Tour Championships. She also won a Tier I event.

Details
- Duration: November 26, 1990 – November 18, 1991
- Edition: 19th
- Tournaments: 60
- Categories: Grand Slam (4); WTA Championships; Tier I (6); Tier II (15); Tier III (6); Tier IV (14); Tier V (14)

Achievements (singles)
- Most titles: (Socialist Federal Republic of Yugoslavia) Monica Seles (10)
- Most finals: (Socialist Federal Republic of Yugoslavia) Monica Seles (16)
- Prize money leader: (Socialist Federal Republic of Yugoslavia) Monica Seles $2,457,758
- Points leader: (Socialist Federal Republic of Yugoslavia) Monica Seles 277.03

Awards
- Player of the year: (Socialist Federal Republic of Yugoslavia) Monica Seles
- Doubles team of the year: (United States) Gigi Fernández; (Czechoslovakia) Jana Novotná
- Most improved player of the year: (Argentina) Gabriela Sabatini
- Newcomer of the year: (Czechoslovakia) Andrea Strnadová
- Comeback player of the year: (United States) Stephanie Rehe

The 1991 WTA Tour (officially titled 1991 Kraft General Foods World Tour after its sponsor) was the elite professional tennis circuit organized by the Women's Tennis Association (WTA) for the 1991 tennis season.

The WTA Tour is the elite tour for professional women's tennis organised by the Women's Tennis Association (WTA). The WTA Tour includes the four Grand Slam tournaments, the WTA Tour Championships and the WTA Tier I, Tier II, Tier III and Tier IV events. ITF tournaments are not part of the WTA Tour, although they award points for the WTA World Ranking.

== Schedule ==
Key

Grand Slam tournaments
Year-end championships
Tier I events
Tier II events
Tier III events
Tier IV and V events
Team events

=== November 1990 ===
Week	Tournament	Champions	Runners-up	Semifinalists	Quarterfinalists
Nov 26	Nivea Cup; São Paulo, Brazil; Tier V event Clay – $75,000 – 32S/16D; Singles – Doubles	(West Germany) Veronika Martinek; 6–2, 6–4	(United States) Donna Faber	(Brazil) Luciana Corsato (Argentina) Florencia Labat	(Czechoslovakia) Eva Švíglerová (France) Catherine Mothes (Argentina) Cristina Tessi (United Kingdom) Samantha Smith
Nov 26	Nivea Cup; São Paulo, Brazil; Tier V event Clay – $75,000 – 32S/16D; Singles – Doubles	(Argentina) Bettina Fulco (Czechoslovakia) Eva Švíglerová; 7–5, 6–4	(France) Mary Pierce (United States) Luanne Spadea	(Brazil) Luciana Corsato (Argentina) Florencia Labat	(Czechoslovakia) Eva Švíglerová (France) Catherine Mothes (Argentina) Cristina Tessi (United Kingdom) Samantha Smith

=== January ===
Week	Tournament	Champions	Runners-up	Semifinalists	Quarterfinalists
Dec 31	Hyundai Hopman Cup; Perth, Australia; ITF Mixed Teams Championships; Hard (i) – A$1,000,000 – 12 teams	Yugoslavia; 3–0	United States	Switzerland; France	Czechoslovakia; Australia; Soviet Union; Spain
Dec 31	Danone Women's Open; Brisbane, Australia; Tier IV event Hard – $150,000 – 56S/32D; Singles – Doubles	(Czechoslovakia) Helena Suková; 6–4, 6–3	(Japan) Akiko Kijimuta	(Soviet Union) Larisa Neiland (United States) Linda Harvey-Wild	(Belgium) Sabine Appelmans (Australia) Rachel McQuillan (Austria) Judith Wiesner (Argentina) Cristina Tessi
Dec 31	Danone Women's Open; Brisbane, Australia; Tier IV event Hard – $150,000 – 56S/32D; Singles – Doubles	(United States) Gigi Fernández (Czechoslovakia) Jana Novotná; 6–3, 6–1	(United States) Patty Fendick (Czechoslovakia) Helena Suková	(Soviet Union) Larisa Neiland (United States) Linda Harvey-Wild	(Belgium) Sabine Appelmans (Australia) Rachel McQuillan (Austria) Judith Wiesner (Argentina) Cristina Tessi
Jan 7	Holden NSW Open; Sydney, Australia; Tier III event Hard – $225,000 – 56S/28D; Singles – Doubles	(Czechoslovakia) Jana Novotná; 6–4, 6–2	(Spain) Arantxa Sánchez Vicario	(Austria) Barbara Paulus (United States) Zina Garrison-Jackson	(United States) Mary Joe Fernández (Switzerland) Manuela Maleeva-Fragnière (Soviet Union) Natasha Zvereva (Australia) Nicole Provis
Jan 7	Holden NSW Open; Sydney, Australia; Tier III event Hard – $225,000 – 56S/28D; Singles – Doubles	(Spain) Arantxa Sánchez Vicario (Czechoslovakia) Helena Suková; 6–1, 6–4	(United States) Gigi Fernández (Czechoslovakia) Jana Novotná	(Austria) Barbara Paulus (United States) Zina Garrison-Jackson	(United States) Mary Joe Fernández (Switzerland) Manuela Maleeva-Fragnière (Soviet Union) Natasha Zvereva (Australia) Nicole Provis
Jan 14; Jan 21	Australian Open; Melbourne, Australia; Grand Slam; Hard – $2,000,000 – 128S/64D/32X; Singles – Doubles – Mixed doubles	(Socialist Federal Republic of Yugoslavia) Monica Seles; 5–7, 6–3, 6–1	(Czechoslovakia) Jana Novotná	(Spain) Arantxa Sánchez Vicario (United States) Mary Joe Fernández	(Germany) Steffi Graf (Argentina) Gabriela Sabatini (Bulgaria) Katerina Maleeva (Germany) Anke Huber
Jan 14; Jan 21	Australian Open; Melbourne, Australia; Grand Slam; Hard – $2,000,000 – 128S/64D/32X; Singles – Doubles – Mixed doubles	(United States) Patty Fendick (United States) Mary Joe Fernández; 7–6^{(7–4)}, 6–1	(United States) Gigi Fernández (Czechoslovakia) Jana Novotná	(Spain) Arantxa Sánchez Vicario (United States) Mary Joe Fernández	(Germany) Steffi Graf (Argentina) Gabriela Sabatini (Bulgaria) Katerina Maleeva (Germany) Anke Huber
Jan 14; Jan 21	Australian Open; Melbourne, Australia; Grand Slam; Hard – $2,000,000 – 128S/64D/32X; Singles – Doubles – Mixed doubles	(United Kingdom) Jo Durie (United Kingdom) Jeremy Bates; 2–6, 6–4, 6–4	(United States) Robin White (United States) Scott Davis	(Spain) Arantxa Sánchez Vicario (United States) Mary Joe Fernández	(Germany) Steffi Graf (Argentina) Gabriela Sabatini (Bulgaria) Katerina Maleeva (Germany) Anke Huber
Jan 28	Nutri-Metics Bendon Classic; Auckland, New Zealand; Tier V event Hard – $100,000 – 32S/16D; Singles – Doubles	(Czechoslovakia) Eva Švíglerová; 6–2, 0–6, 6–1	(Czechoslovakia) Andrea Strnadová	(Argentina) Cristina Tessi (Argentina) Mercedes Paz	(Soviet Union) Larisa Neiland (United States) Donna Faber (Germany) Sabine Hack (Netherlands) Petra Kamstra
Jan 28	Nutri-Metics Bendon Classic; Auckland, New Zealand; Tier V event Hard – $100,000 – 32S/16D; Singles – Doubles	(United States) Patty Fendick (Soviet Union) Larisa Neiland; 6–3, 6–3	(Australia) Jo-Anne Faull (New Zealand) Julie Richardson	(Argentina) Cristina Tessi (Argentina) Mercedes Paz	(Soviet Union) Larisa Neiland (United States) Donna Faber (Germany) Sabine Hack (Netherlands) Petra Kamstra
Jan 28	Toray Pan Pacific Open; Tokyo, Japan; Tier II event Carpet (i) – $350,000 – 28S/16D; Singles – Doubles	(Argentina) Gabriela Sabatini; 2–6, 6–2, 6–4	(United States) Martina Navratilova	(United States) Mary Joe Fernández (Peru) Laura Gildemeister	(Germany) Steffi Graf (Japan) Nana Miyagi (United States) Robin White (United States) Kathy Rinaldi
Jan 28	Toray Pan Pacific Open; Tokyo, Japan; Tier II event Carpet (i) – $350,000 – 28S/16D; Singles – Doubles	(United States) Kathy Jordan (Australia) Elizabeth Smylie; 4–6, 6–0, 6–3	(United States) Mary Joe Fernández (United States) Robin White	(United States) Mary Joe Fernández (Peru) Laura Gildemeister	(Germany) Steffi Graf (Japan) Nana Miyagi (United States) Robin White (United States) Kathy Rinaldi

=== February ===
Week	Tournament	Champions	Runners-up	Semifinalists	Quarterfinalists
Feb 4	Fernleaf Classic; Wellington, New Zealand; Tier V event Hard – $100,000 – 32S/16D; Singles – Doubles	(Soviet Union) Leila Meskhi; 3–6, 7–6^{(7–3)}, 6–2	(Czechoslovakia) Andrea Strnadová	(France) Karine Quentrec (Australia) Kristin Godridge	(Czechoslovakia) Eva Švíglerová (Germany) Sabine Hack (Germany) Barbara Rittner (Australia) Louise Field
Feb 4	Fernleaf Classic; Wellington, New Zealand; Tier V event Hard – $100,000 – 32S/16D; Singles – Doubles	(Australia) Jo-Anne Faull (New Zealand) Julie Richardson; 2–6, 7–5, 7–6^{(7–4)}	(United Kingdom) Belinda Borneo (United Kingdom) Clare Wood	(France) Karine Quentrec (Australia) Kristin Godridge	(Czechoslovakia) Eva Švíglerová (Germany) Sabine Hack (Germany) Barbara Rittner (Australia) Louise Field
Feb 4	Oslo Open; Oslo, Norway; Tier V event Carpet (i) – $75,000 – 32S/16D	(Sweden) Catarina Lindqvist; 6–3, 6–0	(Italy) Raffaella Reggi	(Belgium) Sabine Appelmans (France) Pascale Paradis	(France) Nathalie Herreman (France) Catherine Tanvier (Sweden) Cecilia Dahlman (Austria) Beate Reinstadler
Feb 4	Oslo Open; Oslo, Norway; Tier V event Carpet (i) – $75,000 – 32S/16D	(Germany) Claudia Kohde-Kilsch (Germany) Silke Meier; 6–0, 6–2	(Belgium) Sabine Appelmans (Italy) Raffaella Reggi	(Belgium) Sabine Appelmans (France) Pascale Paradis	(France) Nathalie Herreman (France) Catherine Tanvier (Sweden) Cecilia Dahlman (Austria) Beate Reinstadler
Feb 11	Austrian Tennis Grand Prix; Linz, Austria; Tier V event Carpet (i) – $100,000 – 32S/16D; Singles – Doubles	(Switzerland) Manuela Maleeva-Fragnière; 7–5, 6–3	(Czechoslovakia) Petra Langrová	(Czechoslovakia) Regina Rajchrtová (Germany) Claudia Kohde-Kilsch	(Soviet Union) Eugenia Maniokova (France) Pascale Paradis (Italy) Raffaella Reggi (Austria) Marion Maruska
Feb 11	Austrian Tennis Grand Prix; Linz, Austria; Tier V event Carpet (i) – $100,000 – 32S/16D; Singles – Doubles	(Switzerland) Manuela Maleeva-Fragnière (Italy) Raffaella Reggi; 6–4, 1–6, 6–3	(Czechoslovakia) Petra Langrová (Czechoslovakia) Radka Zrubáková	(Czechoslovakia) Regina Rajchrtová (Germany) Claudia Kohde-Kilsch	(Soviet Union) Eugenia Maniokova (France) Pascale Paradis (Italy) Raffaella Reggi (Austria) Marion Maruska
Feb 11	Colorado Tennis Classic; Aurora, United States; Tier V event Hard (i) – $100,000 – 32S/16D	(United States) Lori McNeil; 6–3, 6–4	(Netherlands) Manon Bollegraf	(United States) Carrie Cunningham (United States) Patty Fendick	(United States) Susan Sloane (United States) Andrea Leand (United States) Halle Cioffi (United States) Peanut Louie Harper
Feb 11	Colorado Tennis Classic; Aurora, United States; Tier V event Hard (i) – $100,000 – 32S/16D	(South Africa) Lise Gregory (United States) Gretchen Rush; 6–4, 6-4	(United States) Patty Fendick (United States) Lori McNeil	(United States) Carrie Cunningham (United States) Patty Fendick	(United States) Susan Sloane (United States) Andrea Leand (United States) Halle Cioffi (United States) Peanut Louie Harper
Feb 11	Virginia Slims of Chicago; Chicago, United States; Tier II event Carpet (i) – $350,000 – 28S/16D; Singles – Doubles	(United States) Martina Navratilova; 6–1, 6–2	(United States) Zina Garrison-Jackson	(Czechoslovakia) Helena Suková (Canada) Helen Kelesi	(United States) Anne Smith (United States) Jennifer Capriati (United States) Amy Frazier (Bulgaria) Katerina Maleeva
Feb 11	Virginia Slims of Chicago; Chicago, United States; Tier II event Carpet (i) – $350,000 – 28S/16D; Singles – Doubles	(United States) Gigi Fernández (Czechoslovakia) Jana Novotná; 6–2, 6–4	(United States) Martina Navratilova (United States) Pam Shriver	(Czechoslovakia) Helena Suková (Canada) Helen Kelesi	(United States) Anne Smith (United States) Jennifer Capriati (United States) Amy Frazier (Bulgaria) Katerina Maleeva
Feb 18	Virginia Slims of Oklahoma; Oklahoma City, United States; Tier IV event Hard (i) – $150,000 – 32S/16D	(Czechoslovakia) Jana Novotná; 3–6, 6–3, 6–2	(United States) Anne Smith	(United States) Lisa Bonder-Kreiss (Netherlands) Manon Bollegraf	(Sweden) Catarina Lindqvist (United States) Renata Baranski (Australia) Anne Minter (Spain) Conchita Martínez
Feb 18	Virginia Slims of Oklahoma; Oklahoma City, United States; Tier IV event Hard (i) – $150,000 – 32S/16D	(United States) Meredith McGrath (United States) Anne Smith; 6–2, 6–4	(United States) Katrina Adams (Canada) Jill Hetherington	(United States) Lisa Bonder-Kreiss (Netherlands) Manon Bollegraf	(Sweden) Catarina Lindqvist (United States) Renata Baranski (Australia) Anne Minter (Spain) Conchita Martínez
Feb 25	Virginia Slims of Palm Springs; Palm Springs, United States; Tier II event Hard – $350,000 – 56S/28D; Singles – Doubles	(United States) Martina Navratilova; 6–2, 7–6^{(8–6)}	(Socialist Federal Republic of Yugoslavia) Monica Seles	(Canada) Helen Kelesi (France) Nathalie Tauziat	(Canada) Patricia Hy (United States) Peanut Louie Harper (Bulgaria) Katerina Maleeva (France) Julie Halard
Feb 25	Virginia Slims of Palm Springs; Palm Springs, United States; Tier II event Hard – $350,000 – 56S/28D; Singles – Doubles	Cancelled due to rain		(Canada) Helen Kelesi (France) Nathalie Tauziat	(Canada) Patricia Hy (United States) Peanut Louie Harper (Bulgaria) Katerina Maleeva (France) Julie Halard

=== March ===
Week	Tournament	Champions	Runners-up	Semifinalists	Quarterfinalists
Mar 4 Mar 11	Virginia Slims of Florida; Boca Raton, United States; Tier I event Hard – $500,000 – 56S/28D; Singles – Doubles	(Argentina) Gabriela Sabatini; 6–4, 7–6^{(8–6)}	(Germany) Steffi Graf	(France) Nathalie Tauziat (United States) Jennifer Capriati	(United States) Meredith McGrath (United States) Mary Joe Fernández (Germany) Claudia Porwik (Czechoslovakia) Regina Kordová
Mar 4 Mar 11	Virginia Slims of Florida; Boca Raton, United States; Tier I event Hard – $500,000 – 56S/28D; Singles – Doubles	(Soviet Union) Larisa Savchenko (Soviet Union) Natasha Zvereva; 6–4, 7–6 ^{(7–3)}	(United States) Meredith McGrath (United States) Anne Smith	(France) Nathalie Tauziat (United States) Jennifer Capriati	(United States) Meredith McGrath (United States) Mary Joe Fernández (Germany) Claudia Porwik (Czechoslovakia) Regina Kordová
Mar 18	Lipton International Players Championships; Key Biscayne, United States; Tier I event Hard – $750,000 – 96S/48D; Singles – Doubles	(Socialist Federal Republic of Yugoslavia) Monica Seles; 6–3, 7–5	(Argentina) Gabriela Sabatini	(Germany) Steffi Graf (United States) Mary Joe Fernández	(Switzerland) Manuela Maleeva-Fragnière (United States) Zina Garrison (United States) Ginger Helgeson (United States) Jennifer Capriati
Mar 18	Lipton International Players Championships; Key Biscayne, United States; Tier I event Hard – $750,000 – 96S/48D; Singles – Doubles	(United States) Mary Joe Fernández (United States) Zina Garrison; 6–4, 6–3	(United States) Gigi Fernández (Czechoslovakia) Jana Novotná	(Germany) Steffi Graf (United States) Mary Joe Fernández	(Switzerland) Manuela Maleeva-Fragnière (United States) Zina Garrison (United States) Ginger Helgeson (United States) Jennifer Capriati
Mar 25	U.S. Women's Hardcourt Championships; San Antonio, United States; Tier III event Hard – $225,000 – 32S/16D; Singles – Doubles	(Germany) Steffi Graf; 6–4, 6–3	(Socialist Federal Republic of Yugoslavia) Monica Seles	(Switzerland) Manuela Maleeva-Fragnière (France) Julie Halard	(United States) Erika deLone (United States) Lori McNeil (Czechoslovakia) Eva Švíglerová (United States) Susan Sloane
Mar 25	U.S. Women's Hardcourt Championships; San Antonio, United States; Tier III event Hard – $225,000 – 32S/16D; Singles – Doubles	(United States) Patty Fendick (Socialist Federal Republic of Yugoslavia) Monica Seles; 7–6^{(7–2)}, 6–2	(Canada) Jill Hetherington (United States) Kathy Rinaldi	(Switzerland) Manuela Maleeva-Fragnière (France) Julie Halard	(United States) Erika deLone (United States) Lori McNeil (Czechoslovakia) Eva Švíglerová (United States) Susan Sloane
Mar 25	Light n' Lively Doubles Championships; Tarpon Springs, United States; Clay – $200,000 – 8D; Doubles	(United States) Gigi Fernández (Czechoslovakia) Helena Suková; 4–6, 6–4, 7–6^{(7–3)}	(Soviet Union) Larisa Savchenko (Soviet Union) Natasha Zvereva	(United States) Jordan / (Australia) Smylie (Spain) Sánchez Vicario / (United States) White	(United States) Burgin / (United States) Daniels (South Africa) Nideffer / (Netherlands) Schultz (United States) McGrath / (United States) Smith (Netherlands) Bollegraf / (South Africa) Gregory

=== April ===
Week	Tournament	Champions	Runners-up	Semifinalists	Quarterfinalists
Apr 1	Family Circle Cup; Hilton Head Island, United States; Tier I event Clay – $500,000 – 56S/28D; Singles – Doubles	(Argentina) Gabriela Sabatini; 6–1, 6–1	(Soviet Union) Leila Meskhi	(Spain) Arantxa Sánchez Vicario (Soviet Union) Natasha Zvereva	(Italy) Federica Bonsignori (Czechoslovakia) Helena Suková (United States) Martina Navratilova (Czechoslovakia) Jana Novotná
Apr 1	Family Circle Cup; Hilton Head Island, United States; Tier I event Clay – $500,000 – 56S/28D; Singles – Doubles	(Germany) Claudia Kohde-Kilsch (Soviet Union) Natasha Zvereva; 6–4, 6–0	(United States) Mary Lou Daniels (South Africa) Lise Gregory	(Spain) Arantxa Sánchez Vicario (Soviet Union) Natasha Zvereva	(Italy) Federica Bonsignori (Czechoslovakia) Helena Suková (United States) Martina Navratilova (Czechoslovakia) Jana Novotná
Apr 8	Bausch & Lomb Championships; Amelia Island, United States; Tier II event Clay – $350,000 – 56S/28D; Singles – Doubles	(Argentina) Gabriela Sabatini; 7–5, 7–6^{(7–3)}	(Germany) Steffi Graf	(United States) Patty Fendick (Spain) Arantxa Sánchez Vicario	(Soviet Union) Natasha Zvereva (United States) Zina Garrison-Jackson (Soviet Union) Leila Meskhi (Czechoslovakia) Helena Suková
Apr 8	Bausch & Lomb Championships; Amelia Island, United States; Tier II event Clay – $350,000 – 56S/28D; Singles – Doubles	(Spain) Arantxa Sánchez Vicario (Czechoslovakia) Helena Suková; 4–6, 6–2, 6–2	(Argentina) Mercedes Paz (Soviet Union) Natasha Zvereva	(United States) Patty Fendick (Spain) Arantxa Sánchez Vicario	(Soviet Union) Natasha Zvereva (United States) Zina Garrison-Jackson (Soviet Union) Leila Meskhi (Czechoslovakia) Helena Suková
Apr 8	Suntory Japan Open Tennis Championships; Tokyo, Japan; Tier IV event Hard – $150,000 – 32S/16D; Singles – Doubles	(United States) Lori McNeil; 2–6, 6–2, 6–1	(Belgium) Sabine Appelmans	(Peru) Laura Gildemeister (Japan) Rika Hiraki	(United States) Amy Frazier (Japan) Kumiko Okamoto (Czechoslovakia) Eva Švíglerová (United States) Marianne Werdel
Apr 8	Suntory Japan Open Tennis Championships; Tokyo, Japan; Tier IV event Hard – $150,000 – 32S/16D; Singles – Doubles	(United States) Amy Frazier (Japan) Maya Kidowaki; 6–2, 6–4	(Japan) Yone Kamio (Japan) Akiko Kijimuta	(Peru) Laura Gildemeister (Japan) Rika Hiraki	(United States) Amy Frazier (Japan) Kumiko Okamoto (Czechoslovakia) Eva Švíglerová (United States) Marianne Werdel
Apr 15	Volvo Women's Open; Pattaya, Thailand; Tier V event Hard – $75,000 – 32S/16D; Singles – Doubles	(Indonesia) Yayuk Basuki; 6–2, 6–2	(Japan) Naoko Sawamatsu	(Japan) Rika Hiraki (United States) Marianne Werdel	(United Kingdom) Sarah Loosemore (Germany) Karin Kschwendt (Japan) Misumi Miyauchi (United Kingdom) Monique Javer
Apr 15	Volvo Women's Open; Pattaya, Thailand; Tier V event Hard – $75,000 – 32S/16D; Singles – Doubles	(Japan) Nana Miyagi (Indonesia) Suzanna Wibowo; 6–1, 6–4	(Japan) Rika Hiraki (Japan) Akemi Nishiya	(Japan) Rika Hiraki (United States) Marianne Werdel	(United Kingdom) Sarah Loosemore (Germany) Karin Kschwendt (Japan) Misumi Miyauchi (United Kingdom) Monique Javer
Apr 15	Virginia Slims of Houston; Houston, United States; Tier II event Clay – $350,000 – 32S/16D; Singles – Doubles	(Socialist Federal Republic of Yugoslavia) Monica Seles; 6–4, 6–3	(United States) Mary Joe Fernández	(Italy) Sandra Cecchini (United States) Linda Harvey-Wild	(Italy) Federica Bonsignori (Bulgaria) Katerina Maleeva (United States) Gigi Fernández (United States) Ann Grossman
Apr 15	Virginia Slims of Houston; Houston, United States; Tier II event Clay – $350,000 – 32S/16D; Singles – Doubles	(Canada) Jill Hetherington (United States) Kathy Rinaldi; 6–1, 2–6, 6–1	(United States) Patty Fendick (United States) Mary Joe Fernández	(Italy) Sandra Cecchini (United States) Linda Harvey-Wild	(Italy) Federica Bonsignori (Bulgaria) Katerina Maleeva (United States) Gigi Fernández (United States) Ann Grossman
Apr 22	Croatian Lottery Cup; Bol, SFR Yugoslavia; Tier V event Clay – $100,000 – 32S/16D; Singles – Doubles	(Italy) Sandra Cecchini; 6–4, 3–6, 7–5	(Bulgaria) Magdalena Maleeva	(Canada) Helen Kelesi (France) Sandrine Testud	(Hungary) Anna-Maria Foldenyi (Italy) Laura Garrone (Switzerland) Csilla Bartos (Czechoslovakia) Andrea Strnadová
Apr 22	Croatian Lottery Cup; Bol, SFR Yugoslavia; Tier V event Clay – $100,000 – 32S/16D; Singles – Doubles	(Italy) Laura Golarsa (Bulgaria) Magdalena Maleeva; Walkover	(Italy) Sandra Cecchini (Italy) Laura Garrone	(Canada) Helen Kelesi (France) Sandrine Testud	(Hungary) Anna-Maria Foldenyi (Italy) Laura Garrone (Switzerland) Csilla Bartos (Czechoslovakia) Andrea Strnadová
Apr 22	International Championships of Spain; Barcelona, Spain; Tier III event Clay – $225,000 – 56S/28D; Singles – Doubles	(Spain) Conchita Martínez; 6–4, 6–1	(Switzerland) Manuela Maleeva-Fragnière	(France) Nathalie Tauziat (Spain) Arantxa Sánchez Vicario	(United States) Martina Navratilova (France) Julie Halard (Switzerland) Emanuela Zardo (Austria) Judith Wiesner
Apr 22	International Championships of Spain; Barcelona, Spain; Tier III event Clay – $225,000 – 56S/28D; Singles – Doubles	(United States) Martina Navratilova (Spain) Arantxa Sánchez Vicario; 6–1, 6–3	(France) Nathalie Tauziat (Austria) Judith Wiesner	(France) Nathalie Tauziat (Spain) Arantxa Sánchez Vicario	(United States) Martina Navratilova (France) Julie Halard (Switzerland) Emanuela Zardo (Austria) Judith Wiesner
Apr 29	Citizen Cup; Hamburg, Germany; Tier II event Clay – $350,000 – 56S/28D; Singles – Doubles	(Germany) Steffi Graf; 7–5, 6–7^{(4–7)}, 6–3	(Socialist Federal Republic of Yugoslavia) Monica Seles	(Austria) Judith Wiesner (Spain) Arantxa Sánchez Vicario	(Czechoslovakia) Helena Suková (Soviet Union) Leila Meskhi (Czechoslovakia) Jana Novotná (Bulgaria) Katerina Maleeva
Apr 29	Citizen Cup; Hamburg, Germany; Tier II event Clay – $350,000 – 56S/28D; Singles – Doubles	(Czechoslovakia) Jana Novotná (Soviet Union) Larisa Neiland; 7–5, 6–1	(Spain) Arantxa Sánchez Vicario (Czechoslovakia) Helena Suková	(Austria) Judith Wiesner (Spain) Arantxa Sánchez Vicario	(Czechoslovakia) Helena Suková (Soviet Union) Leila Meskhi (Czechoslovakia) Jana Novotná (Bulgaria) Katerina Maleeva
Apr 29	Ilva Trophy; Taranto, Italy; Tier V event Clay – $100,000 – 32S/16D; Singles – Doubles	(Switzerland) Emanuela Zardo; 7–5, 6–2	(Austria) Petra Ritter	(Italy) Silvia Farina (Finland) Nanne Dahlman	(Italy) Federica Bonsignori (Argentina) Florencia Labat (Finland) Petra Thorén (France) Noëlle van Lottum
Apr 29	Ilva Trophy; Taranto, Italy; Tier V event Clay – $100,000 – 32S/16D; Singles – Doubles	(France) Alexia Dechaume (Argentina) Florencia Labat; 6–2, 7–5	(Italy) Laura Golarsa (United States) Ann Grossman	(Italy) Silvia Farina (Finland) Nanne Dahlman	(Italy) Federica Bonsignori (Argentina) Florencia Labat (Finland) Petra Thorén (France) Noëlle van Lottum

=== May ===
Week	Tournament	Champions	Runners-up	Semifinalists	Quarterfinalists
May 6	Peugeot Italian Open; Rome, Italy; Tier I event Clay – $500,000 – 56S/28D; Singles – Doubles	(Argentina) Gabriela Sabatini; 6–3, 6–2	(Socialist Federal Republic of Yugoslavia) Monica Seles	(United States) Mary Joe Fernández (Spain) Conchita Martínez	(Soviet Union) Leila Meskhi (Argentina) Bettina Fulco (United States) Martina Navratilova (United States) Jennifer Capriati
May 6	Peugeot Italian Open; Rome, Italy; Tier I event Clay – $500,000 – 56S/28D; Singles – Doubles	(United States) Jennifer Capriati (Socialist Federal Republic of Yugoslavia) Monica Seles; 7–5, 6–2	(Australia) Nicole Provis (South Africa) Elna Reinach	(United States) Mary Joe Fernández (Spain) Conchita Martínez	(Soviet Union) Leila Meskhi (Argentina) Bettina Fulco (United States) Martina Navratilova (United States) Jennifer Capriati
May 13	Lufthansa Cup; Berlin, Germany; Tier I event Clay – $500,000 – 56S/28D; Singles – Doubles	(Germany) Steffi Graf; 6–3, 4–6, 7–6^{(8–6)}	(Spain) Arantxa Sánchez Vicario	(Czechoslovakia) Jana Novotná (United States) Jennifer Capriati	(Czechoslovakia) Radka Zrubáková (United States) Ginger Helgeson (France) Julie Halard (Germany) Anke Huber
May 13	Lufthansa Cup; Berlin, Germany; Tier I event Clay – $500,000 – 56S/28D; Singles – Doubles	(Soviet Union) Larisa Neiland (Soviet Union) Natasha Zvereva; 6–3, 6–3	(Australia) Nicole Provis (South Africa) Elna Reinach	(Czechoslovakia) Jana Novotná (United States) Jennifer Capriati	(Czechoslovakia) Radka Zrubáková (United States) Ginger Helgeson (France) Julie Halard (Germany) Anke Huber
May 20	Internationaux de Strasbourg; Strasbourg, France; Tier IV event Clay – $150,000 – 32S/16D; Singles – Doubles	(Czechoslovakia) Radka Zrubáková; 7–6^{(7–3)}, 7–6^{(7–3)}	(Australia) Rachel McQuillan	(Japan) Naoko Sawamatsu (Australia) Anne Minter	(Austria) Judith Wiesner (Germany) Claudia Kohde-Kilsch (Peru) Laura Gildemeister (United States) Lori McNeil
May 20	Internationaux de Strasbourg; Strasbourg, France; Tier IV event Clay – $150,000 – 32S/16D; Singles – Doubles	(United States) Lori McNeil (United States) Stephanie Rehe; 6–7^{(2–7)}, 6–4, 6–4	(Netherlands) Manon Bollegraf (Argentina) Mercedes Paz	(Japan) Naoko Sawamatsu (Australia) Anne Minter	(Austria) Judith Wiesner (Germany) Claudia Kohde-Kilsch (Peru) Laura Gildemeister (United States) Lori McNeil
May 20	Geneva European Open; Geneva, Switzerland; Tier IV event Clay – $150,000 – 32S/16D; Singles – Doubles	(Switzerland) Manuela Maleeva-Fragnière; 6–3, 3–6, 6–3	(Canada) Helen Kelesi	(Spain) Conchita Martínez (United States) Tami Whitlinger	(Switzerland) Christelle Fauche (United States) Ginger Helgeson (Japan) Maya Kidowaki (United States) Shaun Stafford
May 20	Geneva European Open; Geneva, Switzerland; Tier IV event Clay – $150,000 – 32S/16D; Singles – Doubles	(Australia) Nicole Provis (Australia) Elizabeth Smylie; 6–1, 6–2	(Switzerland) Cathy Caverzasio (Switzerland) Manuela Maleeva-Fragnière	(Spain) Conchita Martínez (United States) Tami Whitlinger	(Switzerland) Christelle Fauche (United States) Ginger Helgeson (Japan) Maya Kidowaki (United States) Shaun Stafford
May 27; Jun 3	French Open; Paris, France; Grand Slam; Clay – $2,698,740 – 128S/64D/64X; Singles – Doubles – Mixed doubles	(Socialist Federal Republic of Yugoslavia) Monica Seles; 6–3, 6–4	(Spain) Arantxa Sánchez Vicario	(Argentina) Gabriela Sabatini (Germany) Steffi Graf	(Spain) Conchita Martínez (Czechoslovakia) Jana Novotná (United States) Mary Joe Fernández (France) Nathalie Tauziat
May 27; Jun 3	French Open; Paris, France; Grand Slam; Clay – $2,698,740 – 128S/64D/64X; Singles – Doubles – Mixed doubles	(United States) Gigi Fernández (Czechoslovakia) Jana Novotná; 6–4, 6–0	(Soviet Union) Larisa Neiland (Soviet Union) Natasha Zvereva	(Argentina) Gabriela Sabatini (Germany) Steffi Graf	(Spain) Conchita Martínez (Czechoslovakia) Jana Novotná (United States) Mary Joe Fernández (France) Nathalie Tauziat
May 27; Jun 3	French Open; Paris, France; Grand Slam; Clay – $2,698,740 – 128S/64D/64X; Singles – Doubles – Mixed doubles	(Czechoslovakia) Helena Suková (Czechoslovakia) Cyril Suk; 3–6, 6–4, 6–1	(Netherlands) Caroline Vis (Netherlands) Paul Haarhuis	(Argentina) Gabriela Sabatini (Germany) Steffi Graf	(Spain) Conchita Martínez (Czechoslovakia) Jana Novotná (United States) Mary Joe Fernández (France) Nathalie Tauziat

=== June ===
Week	Tournament	Champions	Runners-up	Semifinalists	Quarterfinalists
Jun 10	Dow Classic; Birmingham, Great Britain; Tier IV event Grass – $150,000 – 56S/28D; Singles – Doubles	(United States) Martina Navratilova; 6–4, 7–6^{(8–6)}	(Soviet Union) Natasha Zvereva	(Netherlands) Brenda Schultz (United States) Zina Garrison-Jackson	(United States) Lori McNeil (France) Catherine Suire (Netherlands) Manon Bollegraf (South Africa) Mariaan de Swardt
Jun 10	Dow Classic; Birmingham, Great Britain; Tier IV event Grass – $150,000 – 56S/28D; Singles – Doubles	(Australia) Nicole Provis (Australia) Elizabeth Smylie; 6–3, 6–4	(United States) Sandy Collins (South Africa) Elna Reinach	(Netherlands) Brenda Schultz (United States) Zina Garrison-Jackson	(United States) Lori McNeil (France) Catherine Suire (Netherlands) Manon Bollegraf (South Africa) Mariaan de Swardt
Jun 17	Pilkington Glass Championships; Eastbourne, Great Britain; Tier II event Grass – $350,000 – 64S/32D; Singles – Doubles	(United States) Martina Navratilova; 6–4, 6–4	(Spain) Arantxa Sánchez Vicario	(United States) Mary Joe Fernández (United States) Gigi Fernández	(United States) Heather Ludloff (Indonesia) Yayuk Basuki (Czechoslovakia) Jana Novotná (United States) Pam Shriver
Jun 17	Pilkington Glass Championships; Eastbourne, Great Britain; Tier II event Grass – $350,000 – 64S/32D; Singles – Doubles	(Soviet Union) Larisa Savchenko (Soviet Union) Natasha Zvereva; 2–6, 6–4, 6–4	(United States) Gigi Fernández (Czechoslovakia) Jana Novotná	(United States) Mary Joe Fernández (United States) Gigi Fernández	(United States) Heather Ludloff (Indonesia) Yayuk Basuki (Czechoslovakia) Jana Novotná (United States) Pam Shriver
Jun 24; Jul 1	Wimbledon Championships; London, Great Britain; Grand Slam; Grass – $2,728,856 – 128S/64D/64X; Singles – Doubles – Mixed doubles	(Germany) Steffi Graf; 6–4, 3–6, 8–6	(Argentina) Gabriela Sabatini	(United States) Mary Joe Fernández (United States) Jennifer Capriati	(United States) Zina Garrison-Jackson (Spain) Arantxa Sánchez Vicario (United States) Martina Navratilova (Peru) Laura Gildemeister
Jun 24; Jul 1	Wimbledon Championships; London, Great Britain; Grand Slam; Grass – $2,728,856 – 128S/64D/64X; Singles – Doubles – Mixed doubles	(Soviet Union) Larisa Savchenko (Soviet Union) Natasha Zvereva; 6–4, 3–6, 6–4	(United States) Gigi Fernández (Czechoslovakia) Jana Novotná	(United States) Mary Joe Fernández (United States) Jennifer Capriati	(United States) Zina Garrison-Jackson (Spain) Arantxa Sánchez Vicario (United States) Martina Navratilova (Peru) Laura Gildemeister
Jun 24; Jul 1	Wimbledon Championships; London, Great Britain; Grand Slam; Grass – $2,728,856 – 128S/64D/64X; Singles – Doubles – Mixed doubles	(Australia) Elizabeth Smylie (Australia) John Fitzgerald; 7–6^{(7–4)}, 6–2	(Soviet Union) Natasha Zvereva (United States) Jim Pugh	(United States) Mary Joe Fernández (United States) Jennifer Capriati	(United States) Zina Garrison-Jackson (Spain) Arantxa Sánchez Vicario (United States) Martina Navratilova (Peru) Laura Gildemeister

=== July ===
Week	Tournament	Champions	Runners-up	Semifinalists	Quarterfinalists
Jul 8	Internazionali Femminili di Palermo; Palermo, Italy; Tier V event Clay – $75,000 – 32S/16D	(France) Mary Pierce; 6–0, 6–3	(Italy) Sandra Cecchini	(Switzerland) Emanuela Zardo (Belgium) Sandra Wasserman	(Argentina) Cristina Tessi (Germany) Silke Frankl (France) Maïder Laval (France) Catherine Mothes
Jul 8	Internazionali Femminili di Palermo; Palermo, Italy; Tier V event Clay – $75,000 – 32S/16D	(France) Mary Pierce (Czechoslovakia) Petra Langrová; 6–3, 6–7^{(5–7)}, 6–3	(Italy) Laura Garrone (Argentina) Mercedes Paz	(Switzerland) Emanuela Zardo (Belgium) Sandra Wasserman	(Argentina) Cristina Tessi (Germany) Silke Frankl (France) Maïder Laval (France) Catherine Mothes
Jul 15	Volvo San Marino Open; City of San Marino, San Marino; Tier V event Clay – $75,000 – 32S/16D; Singles – Doubles	(Italy) Katia Piccolini; 6–2, 6–3	(Italy) Silvia Farina	(Bulgaria) Elena Pampoulova-Wagner (Czechoslovakia) Denisa Szabová	(Italy) Raffaella Reggi (Germany) Sabine Hack (United States) Carrie Cunningham (Soviet Union) Eugenia Maniokova
Jul 15	Volvo San Marino Open; City of San Marino, San Marino; Tier V event Clay – $75,000 – 32S/16D; Singles – Doubles	(Australia) Kerry-Anne Guse (Japan) Akemi Nishiya; 6–0, 6–3	(Italy) Laura Garrone (Argentina) Mercedes Paz	(Bulgaria) Elena Pampoulova-Wagner (Czechoslovakia) Denisa Szabová	(Italy) Raffaella Reggi (Germany) Sabine Hack (United States) Carrie Cunningham (Soviet Union) Eugenia Maniokova
Jul 15	Citroën Austrian Ladies Open; Kitzbühel, Austria; Tier IV event Clay – $150,000 – 32S/16D	(Spain) Conchita Martínez; 6–1, 2–6, 6–3	(Austria) Judith Wiesner	(Czechoslovakia) Radka Zrubáková (Netherlands) Nicole Jagerman	(Czechoslovakia) Eva Švíglerová (Italy) Sandra Cecchini (Argentina) Florencia Labat (Austria) Marion Maruska
Jul 15	Citroën Austrian Ladies Open; Kitzbühel, Austria; Tier IV event Clay – $150,000 – 32S/16D	(Argentina) Bettina Fulco (Netherlands) Nicole Jagerman; 7–6, 6–1	(Italy) Sandra Cecchini (Argentina) Patricia Tarabini	(Czechoslovakia) Radka Zrubáková (Netherlands) Nicole Jagerman	(Czechoslovakia) Eva Švíglerová (Italy) Sandra Cecchini (Argentina) Florencia Labat (Austria) Marion Maruska
Jul 22	Westchester Cup; Westchester, United States; Tier V event Hard – $100,000 – 32S/16D; Singles – Doubles	(France) Isabelle Demongeot; 6–4, 6–4	(United States) Lori McNeil	(Peru) Laura Gildemeister (South Africa) Rosalyn Fairbank-Nideffer	(Germany) Marketa Kochta (United States) Carrie Cunningham (United States) Lisa Raymond (United States) Debbie Graham
Jul 22	Westchester Cup; Westchester, United States; Tier V event Hard – $100,000 – 32S/16D; Singles – Doubles	(South Africa) Rosalyn Fairbank-Nideffer (South Africa) Lise Gregory; 7–5, 6–4	(United States) Katrina Adams (United States) Lori McNeil	(Peru) Laura Gildemeister (South Africa) Rosalyn Fairbank-Nideffer	(Germany) Marketa Kochta (United States) Carrie Cunningham (United States) Lisa Raymond (United States) Debbie Graham
Jul 22	1991 Fed Cup; Nottingham, Great Britain, Hard; Team Event; Clay – 32 Teams	Spain; 2-1	United States	Czechoslovakia; Germany	Austria; Switzerland; Italy; Indonesia
Jul 29	Mazda Classic; San Diego, United States; Tier III event Hard – $225,000 – 32S/16D; Singles – Doubles	(United States) Jennifer Capriati; 4–6, 6–1, 7–6^{(7–2)}	(Socialist Federal Republic of Yugoslavia) Monica Seles	(France) Nathalie Tauziat (Spain) Conchita Martínez	(Australia) Anne Minter (Switzerland) Manuela Maleeva-Fragnière (United States) Zina Garrison-Jackson (United States) Debbie Graham
Jul 29	Mazda Classic; San Diego, United States; Tier III event Hard – $225,000 – 32S/16D; Singles – Doubles	(Canada) Jill Hetherington (United States) Kathy Rinaldi; 6–4, 3–6, 6–2	(United States) Gigi Fernández (France) Nathalie Tauziat	(France) Nathalie Tauziat (Spain) Conchita Martínez	(Australia) Anne Minter (Switzerland) Manuela Maleeva-Fragnière (United States) Zina Garrison-Jackson (United States) Debbie Graham

=== August ===
Week	Tournament	Champions	Runners-up	Semifinalists	Quarterfinalists
Aug 5	Virginia Slims of Albuquerque; Albuquerque, United States; Tier IV event Hard – $150,000 – 32S/16D; Singles – Doubles	(United States) Gigi Fernández; 6–0, 6–2	(France) Julie Halard	(South Africa) Elna Reinach (United States) Susan Sloane	(United States) Katrina Adams (France) Mary Pierce (France) Sandrine Testud (Italy) Linda Ferrando
Aug 5	Virginia Slims of Albuquerque; Albuquerque, United States; Tier IV event Hard – $150,000 – 32S/16D; Singles – Doubles	(United States) Katrina Adams (France) Isabelle Demongeot; 6–7^{(2–7)}, 6–4, 6–3	(South Africa) Lise Gregory (United States) Peanut Louie Harper	(South Africa) Elna Reinach (United States) Susan Sloane	(United States) Katrina Adams (France) Mary Pierce (France) Sandrine Testud (Italy) Linda Ferrando
Aug 5	Canadian Open; Toronto, Canada; Tier I event Hard – $500,000 – 56S/28D; Singles – Doubles	(United States) Jennifer Capriati; 6–2, 6–3	(Bulgaria) Katerina Maleeva	(Argentina) Gabriela Sabatini (Switzerland) Manuela Maleeva-Fragnière	(Czechoslovakia) Helena Suková (Soviet Union) Natasha Zvereva (Peru) Laura Gildemeister (United States) Amy Frazier
Aug 5	Canadian Open; Toronto, Canada; Tier I event Hard – $500,000 – 56S/28D; Singles – Doubles	(Soviet Union) Larisa Neiland (Soviet Union) Natasha Zvereva; 1–6, 7–5, 6–2	(Germany) Claudia Kohde-Kilsch (Czechoslovakia) Helena Suková	(Argentina) Gabriela Sabatini (Switzerland) Manuela Maleeva-Fragnière	(Czechoslovakia) Helena Suková (Soviet Union) Natasha Zvereva (Peru) Laura Gildemeister (United States) Amy Frazier
Aug 12	Virginia Slims of Los Angeles; Manhattan Beach, United States; Tier II event Hard – $350,000 – 56S/28D; Singles – Doubles	(Socialist Federal Republic of Yugoslavia) Monica Seles; 6–3, 6–1	(Japan) Kimiko Date	(Spain) Arantxa Sánchez Vicario (Argentina) Gabriela Sabatini	(Argentina) Mercedes Paz (Czechoslovakia) Helena Suková (United Kingdom) Jo Durie (United States) Lori McNeil
Aug 12	Virginia Slims of Los Angeles; Manhattan Beach, United States; Tier II event Hard – $350,000 – 56S/28D; Singles – Doubles	(Soviet Union) Larisa Neiland (Soviet Union) Natasha Zvereva; 6–1, 2–6, 6–2	(United States) Gretchen Magers (United States) Robin White	(Spain) Arantxa Sánchez Vicario (Argentina) Gabriela Sabatini	(Argentina) Mercedes Paz (Czechoslovakia) Helena Suková (United Kingdom) Jo Durie (United States) Lori McNeil
Aug 19	Virginia Slims of Washington; Washington, United States; Tier II event Hard – $350,000 – 28S/16D; Singles – Doubles	(Spain) Arantxa Sánchez Vicario; 6–1, 5–7, 6–4	(Bulgaria) Katerina Maleeva	(United States) Mary Joe Fernández (Soviet Union) Leila Meskhi	(Austria) Judith Wiesner (United States) Gigi Fernández (Czechoslovakia) Jana Novotná (United States) Zina Garrison-Jackson
Aug 19	Virginia Slims of Washington; Washington, United States; Tier II event Hard – $350,000 – 28S/16D; Singles – Doubles	(Czechoslovakia) Jana Novotná (Soviet Union) Larisa Neiland; 5–7, 6–1, 7–6^{(12–10)}	(United States) Gigi Fernández (Soviet Union) Natasha Zvereva	(United States) Mary Joe Fernández (Soviet Union) Leila Meskhi	(Austria) Judith Wiesner (United States) Gigi Fernández (Czechoslovakia) Jana Novotná (United States) Zina Garrison-Jackson
Aug 19	OTB International Open; Schenectady, United States; Tier V event Hard – $100,000 – 32S/16D; Singles – Doubles	(Netherlands) Brenda Schultz; 7–6^{(7–5)}, 6–2	(France) Alexia Dechaume	(United States) Marianne Werdel (Australia) Nicole Provis	(Germany) Anke Huber (Japan) Naoko Sawamatsu (Australia) Rachel McQuillan (Argentina) Florencia Labat
Aug 19	OTB International Open; Schenectady, United States; Tier V event Hard – $100,000 – 32S/16D; Singles – Doubles	(Australia) Rachel McQuillan (Germany) Claudia Porwik; 6–2, 6–4	(United States) Nicole Arendt (United States) Shannan McCarthy	(United States) Marianne Werdel (Australia) Nicole Provis	(Germany) Anke Huber (Japan) Naoko Sawamatsu (Australia) Rachel McQuillan (Argentina) Florencia Labat
Aug 26; Sep 2	US Open; New York City, United States; Grand Slam; Hard – $2,700,000 – 128S/64D/32X; Singles – Doubles – Mixed doubles	(Socialist Federal Republic of Yugoslavia) Monica Seles; 7–6^{(7–1)}, 6–1	(United States) Martina Navratilova	(Germany) Steffi Graf (United States) Jennifer Capriati	(Spain) Conchita Martínez (Spain) Arantxa Sánchez Vicario (Argentina) Gabriela Sabatini (United States) Gigi Fernández
Aug 26; Sep 2	US Open; New York City, United States; Grand Slam; Hard – $2,700,000 – 128S/64D/32X; Singles – Doubles – Mixed doubles	(United States) Pam Shriver (Soviet Union) Natasha Zvereva; 6–4, 4–6, 7–6^{(7–5)}	(Czechoslovakia) Jana Novotná (Soviet Union) Larisa Neiland	(Germany) Steffi Graf (United States) Jennifer Capriati	(Spain) Conchita Martínez (Spain) Arantxa Sánchez Vicario (Argentina) Gabriela Sabatini (United States) Gigi Fernández
Aug 26; Sep 2	US Open; New York City, United States; Grand Slam; Hard – $2,700,000 – 128S/64D/32X; Singles – Doubles – Mixed doubles	(Netherlands) Manon Bollegraf (Netherlands) Tom Nijssen; 6–2, 7–6^{(7–2)}	(Spain) Arantxa Sánchez Vicario (Spain) Emilio Sánchez	(Germany) Steffi Graf (United States) Jennifer Capriati	(Spain) Conchita Martínez (Spain) Arantxa Sánchez Vicario (Argentina) Gabriela Sabatini (United States) Gigi Fernández

=== September ===
Week	Tournament	Champions	Runners-up	Semifinalists	Quarterfinalists
Sep 16	Nichirei International Championships; Tokyo, Japan; Tier II event Hard – $350,000 – 28S/16D; Singles – Doubles	(Socialist Federal Republic of Yugoslavia) Monica Seles; 6–1, 6–1	(United States) Mary Joe Fernández	(United States) Amy Frazier (Bulgaria) Katerina Maleeva	(Japan) Maya Kidowaki (United States) Debbie Graham (Peru) Laura Gildemeister (United States) Marianne Werdel
Sep 16	Nichirei International Championships; Tokyo, Japan; Tier II event Hard – $350,000 – 28S/16D; Singles – Doubles	(United States) Mary Joe Fernández (United States) Pam Shriver; 6–3, 6–3	(United States) Carrie Cunningham (Peru) Laura Gildemeister	(United States) Amy Frazier (Bulgaria) Katerina Maleeva	(Japan) Maya Kidowaki (United States) Debbie Graham (Peru) Laura Gildemeister (United States) Marianne Werdel
Sep 16	Clarins Open; Paris, France; Tier IV event Clay – $150,000 – 32S/16D; Singles – Doubles	(Spain) Conchita Martínez; 6–0, 6–3	(Argentina) Inés Gorrochategui	(France) Julie Halard (Argentina) Mercedes Paz	(Switzerland) Emanuela Zardo (Germany) Veronika Martinek (Netherlands) Nicole Jagerman (Germany) Silke Meier
Sep 16	Clarins Open; Paris, France; Tier IV event Clay – $150,000 – 32S/16D; Singles – Doubles	(Czechoslovakia) Petra Langrová (Czechoslovakia) Radka Zrubáková; 6–4, 6–4	(France) Alexia Dechaume (France) Julie Halard	(France) Julie Halard (Argentina) Mercedes Paz	(Switzerland) Emanuela Zardo (Germany) Veronika Martinek (Netherlands) Nicole Jagerman (Germany) Silke Meier
Sep 23	Open Whirlpool - Ville de Bayonne; Bayonne, France; Tier IV event Carpet (i) – $150,000 – 32S/16D	(Switzerland) Manuela Maleeva-Fragnière; 4–6, 6–3, 6–4	(Soviet Union) Leila Meskhi	(Australia) Rachel McQuillan (France) Nathalie Tauziat	(France) Julie Halard (Czechoslovakia) Radka Zrubáková (Czechoslovakia) Eva Švíglerová (Germany) Claudia Porwik
Sep 23	Open Whirlpool - Ville de Bayonne; Bayonne, France; Tier IV event Carpet (i) – $150,000 – 32S/16D	(Argentina) Patricia Tarabini (France) Nathalie Tauziat; 6–3, Retired	(Australia) Rachel McQuillan (France) Catherine Tanvier	(Australia) Rachel McQuillan (France) Nathalie Tauziat	(France) Julie Halard (Czechoslovakia) Radka Zrubáková (Czechoslovakia) Eva Švíglerová (Germany) Claudia Porwik
Sep 23	St. Petersburg Open; Saint Petersburg, Soviet Union; Tier V event Carpet (i) – $100,000 – 32S/16D; Singles – Doubles	(Soviet Union) Larisa Neiland; 3–6, 6–3, 6–4	(Germany) Barbara Rittner	(United Kingdom) Jo Durie (Germany) Katja Oeljeklaus	(Soviet Union) Elena Brioukhovets (France) Isabelle Demongeot (France) Sandrine Testud (United States) Ann Henricksson
Sep 23	St. Petersburg Open; Saint Petersburg, Soviet Union; Tier V event Carpet (i) – $100,000 – 32S/16D; Singles – Doubles	(Soviet Union) Elena Brioukhovets (Soviet Union) Natalia Medvedeva; 7–5, 6–3	(France) Isabelle Demongeot (United Kingdom) Jo Durie	(United Kingdom) Jo Durie (Germany) Katja Oeljeklaus	(Soviet Union) Elena Brioukhovets (France) Isabelle Demongeot (France) Sandrine Testud (United States) Ann Henricksson
Sep 30	Volkswagen Cup; Leipzig, Germany; Tier III event Carpet (i) – $225,000 – 28S/16D; Singles – Doubles	(Germany) Steffi Graf; 6–3, 6–3	(Czechoslovakia) Jana Novotná	(Austria) Barbara Paulus (Spain) Arantxa Sánchez Vicario	(Austria) Judith Wiesner (Bulgaria) Katerina Maleeva (Germany) Anke Huber (Germany) Barbara Rittner
Sep 30	Volkswagen Cup; Leipzig, Germany; Tier III event Carpet (i) – $225,000 – 28S/16D; Singles – Doubles	(Netherlands) Manon Bollegraf (France) Isabelle Demongeot; 6–4, 6–3	(Canada) Jill Hetherington (United States) Kathy Rinaldi	(Austria) Barbara Paulus (Spain) Arantxa Sánchez Vicario	(Austria) Judith Wiesner (Bulgaria) Katerina Maleeva (Germany) Anke Huber (Germany) Barbara Rittner
Sep 30	Milan Ladies Open; Milan, Italy; Tier III event Carpet (i) – $225,000 – 28S/16	(Socialist Federal Republic of Yugoslavia) Monica Seles; 6–3, 3–6, 6–4	(United States) Martina Navratilova	(Spain) Conchita Martínez (United States) Mary Joe Fernández	(Czechoslovakia) Helena Suková (United States) Gigi Fernández (Bulgaria) Magdalena Maleeva (Belgium) Sabine Appelmans
Sep 30	Milan Ladies Open; Milan, Italy; Tier III event Carpet (i) – $225,000 – 28S/16	(United States) Sandy Collins (United States) Lori McNeil; 7–6^{(7–0)}, 6–3	(Belgium) Sabine Appelmans (Italy) Raffaella Reggi	(Spain) Conchita Martínez (United States) Mary Joe Fernández	(Czechoslovakia) Helena Suková (United States) Gigi Fernández (Bulgaria) Magdalena Maleeva (Belgium) Sabine Appelmans

=== October ===
Week	Tournament	Champions	Runners-up	Semifinalists	Quarterfinalists
Oct 7	BMW European Indoors; Zürich, Switzerland; Tier II event Carpet (i) – $350,000 – 32S/16D	(West Germany) Steffi Graf; 6–4, 6–4	(France) Nathalie Tauziat	(Czechoslovakia) Helena Suková (Switzerland) Manuela Maleeva-Fragnière	(Germany) Marketa Kochta (Czechoslovakia) Jana Novotná (Austria) Judith Wiesner (Argentina) Gabriela Sabatini
Oct 7	BMW European Indoors; Zürich, Switzerland; Tier II event Carpet (i) – $350,000 – 32S/16D	(Czechoslovakia) Jana Novotná (Czechoslovakia) Andrea Strnadová; 6–4, 6–3	(United States) Zina Garrison-Jackson (United States) Lori McNeil	(Czechoslovakia) Helena Suková (Switzerland) Manuela Maleeva-Fragnière	(Germany) Marketa Kochta (Czechoslovakia) Jana Novotná (Austria) Judith Wiesner (Argentina) Gabriela Sabatini
Oct 14	Porsche Tennis Grand Prix; Filderstadt, Germany; Tier II event Carpet (i) – $350,000 – 32S/16D; Singles – Doubles	(Germany) Anke Huber; 2–6, 6–2, 7–6^{(7–4)}	(United States) Martina Navratilova	(Austria) Judith Wiesner (Czechoslovakia) Helena Suková	(France) Nathalie Tauziat (Czechoslovakia) Jana Novotná (United States) Zina Garrison-Jackson (United States) Mary Joe Fernández
Oct 14	Porsche Tennis Grand Prix; Filderstadt, Germany; Tier II event Carpet (i) – $350,000 – 32S/16D; Singles – Doubles	(United States) Martina Navratilova (Czechoslovakia) Jana Novotná; 6–2, 5–7, 6–4	(United States) Pam Shriver (Soviet Union) Natasha Zvereva	(Austria) Judith Wiesner (Czechoslovakia) Helena Suková	(France) Nathalie Tauziat (Czechoslovakia) Jana Novotná (United States) Zina Garrison-Jackson (United States) Mary Joe Fernández
Oct 21	Midland Bank Championships; Brighton, Great Britain; Tier II event Carpet (i) – $350,000 – 32S/16D; Singles – Doubles	(Germany) Steffi Graf; 5–7, 6–4, 6–1	(United States) Zina Garrison-Jackson	(Austria) Barbara Paulus (Sweden) Catarina Lindqvist	(United States) Lori McNeil (France) Nathalie Tauziat (Czechoslovakia) Radka Zrubáková (Bulgaria) Katerina Maleeva
Oct 21	Midland Bank Championships; Brighton, Great Britain; Tier II event Carpet (i) – $350,000 – 32S/16D; Singles – Doubles	(United States) Pam Shriver (Soviet Union) Natasha Zvereva; 6–1, 6–2	(United States) Zina Garrison-Jackson (United States) Lori McNeil	(Austria) Barbara Paulus (Sweden) Catarina Lindqvist	(United States) Lori McNeil (France) Nathalie Tauziat (Czechoslovakia) Radka Zrubáková (Bulgaria) Katerina Maleeva
Oct 21	Puerto Rico Open; Dorado, Puerto Rico; Tier IV event Hard – $150,000 – 32S/16D; Singles – Doubles	(France) Julie Halard; 7–5, 7–5	(South Africa) Amanda Coetzer	(Belgium) Sabine Appelmans (France) Mary Pierce	(United States) Gigi Fernández (United States) Susan Sloane (United States) Carrie Cunningham (Germany) Barbara Rittner
Oct 21	Puerto Rico Open; Dorado, Puerto Rico; Tier IV event Hard – $150,000 – 32S/16D; Singles – Doubles	(Japan) Rika Hiraki (Argentina) Florencia Labat; 6–3, 6–3	(Belgium) Sabine Appelmans (United States) Camille Benjamin	(Belgium) Sabine Appelmans (France) Mary Pierce	(United States) Gigi Fernández (United States) Susan Sloane (United States) Carrie Cunningham (Germany) Barbara Rittner
Oct 28	Arizona Classic; Scottsdale, United States; Tier IV event Hard – $150,000 – 32S/16D; Singles – Doubles	(Belgium) Sabine Appelmans; 7–5, 6–1	(United States) Chanda Rubin	(Czechoslovakia) Karina Habšudová (France) Julie Halard	(United States) Ginger Helgeson (United States) Kimberly Po (Australia) Nicole Provis (United States) Patty Fendick
Oct 28	Arizona Classic; Scottsdale, United States; Tier IV event Hard – $150,000 – 32S/16D; Singles – Doubles	(United States) Peanut Louie Harper (United States) Cammy MacGregor; 7–5, 3–6, 6–3	(United States) Sandy Collins (South Africa) Elna Reinach	(Czechoslovakia) Karina Habšudová (France) Julie Halard	(United States) Ginger Helgeson (United States) Kimberly Po (Australia) Nicole Provis (United States) Patty Fendick

=== November ===
Week	Tournament	Champions	Runners-up	Semifinalists	Quarterfinalists
Nov 4	Virginia Slims of California; Oakland, United States; Tier II event Carpet (i) – $350,000 – 32S/16D	(United States) Martina Navratilova; 6–3, 3–6, 6–3	(Socialist Federal Republic of Yugoslavia) Monica Seles	(Switzerland) Manuela Maleeva-Fragnière (United States) Lori McNeil	(United States) Linda Harvey-Wild (United States) Amy Frazier (United States) Stephanie Rehe (France) Mary Pierce
Nov 4	Virginia Slims of California; Oakland, United States; Tier II event Carpet (i) – $350,000 – 32S/16D	(United States) Patty Fendick (United States) Gigi Fernández; 6–4, 7–5	(United States) Martina Navratilova (United States) Pam Shriver	(Switzerland) Manuela Maleeva-Fragnière (United States) Lori McNeil	(United States) Linda Harvey-Wild (United States) Amy Frazier (United States) Stephanie Rehe (France) Mary Pierce
Nov 4	Virginia Slims of Nashville; Brentwood, United States; Tier IV event Hard (i) – $150,000 – 32S/16D; Singles – Doubles	(Belgium) Sabine Appelmans; 6–2, 6–4	(United States) Katrina Adams	(Czechoslovakia) Karina Habšudová (Soviet Union) Natalia Medvedeva	(Indonesia) Yayuk Basuki (United States) Mary Lou Daniels (United States) Tammy Whittington (France) Isabelle Demongeot
Nov 4	Virginia Slims of Nashville; Brentwood, United States; Tier IV event Hard (i) – $150,000 – 32S/16D; Singles – Doubles	(United States) Sandy Collins (South Africa) Elna Reinach; 5–7, 6–4, 7–6^{(9–7)}	(Indonesia) Yayuk Basuki (Netherlands) Caroline Vis	(Czechoslovakia) Karina Habšudová (Soviet Union) Natalia Medvedeva	(Indonesia) Yayuk Basuki (United States) Mary Lou Daniels (United States) Tammy Whittington (France) Isabelle Demongeot
Nov 11	Jello Classic; Indianapolis, United States; Tier IV event Hard (i) – $150,000 – 32S/16D	(Bulgaria) Katerina Maleeva; 7–6^{(7–1)}, 6–2	(United States) Audra Keller	(Argentina) Mercedes Paz (Czechoslovakia) Radka Zrubáková	(United States) Susan Sloane (United States) Mary Lou Daniels (United States) Linda Harvey-Wild (Finland) Petra Thorén
Nov 11	Jello Classic; Indianapolis, United States; Tier IV event Hard (i) – $150,000 – 32S/16D	(United States) Patty Fendick (United States) Gigi Fernández; 6–4, 6–2	(United States) Katrina Adams (Argentina) Mercedes Paz	(Argentina) Mercedes Paz (Czechoslovakia) Radka Zrubáková	(United States) Susan Sloane (United States) Mary Lou Daniels (United States) Linda Harvey-Wild (Finland) Petra Thorén
Nov 11	Virginia Slims of Philadelphia; Philadelphia, United States; Tier II event Carpet (i) – $350,000 – 32S/16D; Singles – Doubles	(Socialist Federal Republic of Yugoslavia) Monica Seles; 7–5, 6–1	(United States) Jennifer Capriati	(Spain) Arantxa Sánchez Vicario (Argentina) Gabriela Sabatini	(United States) Zina Garrison-Jackson (Netherlands) Brenda Schultz (Switzerland) Manuela Maleeva-Fragnière (Spain) Conchita Martínez
Nov 11	Virginia Slims of Philadelphia; Philadelphia, United States; Tier II event Carpet (i) – $350,000 – 32S/16D; Singles – Doubles	(Czechoslovakia) Jana Novotná (Soviet Union) Larisa Neiland; 6–2, 6–4	(United States) Mary Joe Fernández (United States) Zina Garrison-Jackson	(Spain) Arantxa Sánchez Vicario (Argentina) Gabriela Sabatini	(United States) Zina Garrison-Jackson (Netherlands) Brenda Schultz (Switzerland) Manuela Maleeva-Fragnière (Spain) Conchita Martínez
Nov 18	Virginia Slims Championships; New York City, United States; Year-end Championship; Carpet (i) – $3,000,000 – 16S/8D; Singles – Doubles	(Socialist Federal Republic of Yugoslavia) Monica Seles; 6–4, 3–6, 7–5, 6–0	(United States) Martina Navratilova	(Argentina) Gabriela Sabatini (Czechoslovakia) Jana Novotná	(United States) Mary Joe Fernández (United States) Jennifer Capriati (Spain) Arantxa Sánchez Vicario (Germany) Steffi Graf
Nov 18	Virginia Slims Championships; New York City, United States; Year-end Championship; Carpet (i) – $3,000,000 – 16S/8D; Singles – Doubles	(United States) Martina Navratilova (United States) Pam Shriver; 4–6, 7–5, 6–4	(United States) Gigi Fernández (Czechoslovakia) Jana Novotná	(Argentina) Gabriela Sabatini (Czechoslovakia) Jana Novotná	(United States) Mary Joe Fernández (United States) Jennifer Capriati (Spain) Arantxa Sánchez Vicario (Germany) Steffi Graf

== Rankings ==
Below are the 1991 WTA year-end rankings (November 25, 1991) in both singles and doubles competition:

Singles Year-end Ranking
No	Player Name	Points	1990	Change
1	Monica Seles (YUG)	277.5000	2	+1
2	Steffi Graf (GER)	219.2929	1	-1
3	Gabriela Sabatini (ARG)	200.0625	5	+2
4	Martina Navratilova (USA)	191.1209	3	-1
5	Arantxa Sánchez Vicario (ESP)	153.4042	7	+2
6	Jennifer Capriati (USA)	142.9872	8	+2
7	Jana Novotná (CZE)	108.5754	13	+6
8	Mary Joe Fernández (USA)	100.9980	4	-4
9	Conchita Martínez (ESP)	95.0357	11	+2
10	Manuela Maleeva-Fragnière (SUI)	87.6250	9	-1
11	Katerina Maleeva (BUL)	74.8938	6	-5
12	Zina Garrison (USA)	66.4118	10	-2
13	Nathalie Tauziat (FRA)	64.6053	18	+5
14	Anke Huber (GER)	62.2143	37	+23
15	Leila Meskhi (URS)	61.2333	19	+4
16	Judith Wiesner (AUT)	58.8929	17	+1
17	Helena Suková (CZE)	56.7500	14	-3
18	Sabine Appelmans (BEL)	50.8813	22	+4
19	Lori McNeil (USA)	45.6727	52	+33
20	Julie Halard (FRA)	44.9391	41	+21

Doubles Year-end Ranking
No	Player Name	Points	1990	Change
1	Jana Novotná (CZE)	376.4444	2	+1
2	Larisa Savchenko (URS)	341.7549	7	+5
3	Natasha Zvereva (URS)	330.4679	5	+2
4	Gigi Fernández (USA)	319.5391	3	-1
5	Mary Joe Fernández (USA)	245.4052	6	+1
6	Martina Navratilova (USA)	241.1909	4	-2
7	Arantxa Sánchez Vicario (ESP)	222.3563	8	+1
8	Helena Suková (CZE)	208.7786	1	-7
9	Pam Shriver (USA)	200.9474	92	+83
10	Patty Fendick (USA)	188.1000	11	+1
11	Anne Smith (USA)	176.2258	17	+6
12	Zina Garrison (USA)	174.3524	13	+1
13	Jill Hetherington (CAN)	145.7619	43	+30
14	Elizabeth Smylie (AUS)	141.7350	10	-4
15	Mercedes Paz (ARG)	141.3158	14	-1
16	Katrina Adams (USA)	137.8947	21	+5
17	Elna Reinach (RSA)	137.8500	19	+2
18	Nicole Provis (AUS)	135.8824	26	+8
19	Lori McNeil (USA)	134.6842	22	+3
20	Kathy Rinaldi (USA)	134.6000	80	+60

== See also ==
- 1991 ATP Tour
