= 1991 Nichirei International Championships – Doubles =

Doubles
- 1991 Nichirei International Championships

Final
- Champions: (United States) Mary Joe Fernández (United States) Pam Shriver
- Runners-up: (United States) Carrie Cunningham (Peru) Laura Gildemeister
- Score: 6–3, 6–3

Details
- Draw: 16
- Seeds: 4

Events
Singles	Doubles
← 1990 ·	Nichirei International Championships	· 1992 →

Mary Joe Fernández and Robin White were the defending champions, but White did not compete this year.

Fernández teamed with Pam Shriver and successfully defended her title, by defeating Carrie Cunningham and Laura Gildemeister 6–3, 6–3 in the final.

== Seeds ==
1. (United States) Mary Joe Fernández / (United States) Pam Shriver (champions)
2. (Australia) Elizabeth Smylie / (Czechoslovakia) Andrea Strnadová (quarterfinals)
3. (United States) Amy Frazier / (Japan) Maya Kidowaki (quarterfinals)
4. (Japan) Kimiko Date / (United States) Peanut Louie Harper (semifinals)

== Draw ==
=== Key ===
- Q = Qualifier
- WC = Wild card
- LL = Lucky loser
- Alt = Alternate
- ITF = ITF entry
- PR = Protected ranking
- SR = Special ranking
- SE = Special exempt
- JE = Junior exempt
- JR = Junior Accelerator Programme entrant
- CO = College Accelerator Programme entrant
- NG = Next Gen Accelerator Program entrant
- w/o = Walkover
- r = Retired
- d = Defaulted

=== Draw ===
First round
1	(United States) MJ Fernández (United States) P Shriver	6	6
(Japan) A Kijimuta (Japan) N Sawamatsu	1	4
(Japan) E Iida (Japan) A Nishiya	6^{1}	6	7
(United Kingdom) M Javer (Japan) M Miyauchi	7^{7}	0	5
4	(Japan) K Date (United States) P Louie Harper	6	6
(United States) Sylvia Schenck (Argentina) C Tessi	2	0
(Japan) R Hiraki (Australia) A Minter	2	1
(Indonesia) Y Basuki (Japan) N Miyagi	6	6
(Japan) H Nagano (Japan) M Yokobori	0	5
(United States) C Cunningham (Peru) L Gildemeister	6	7
(Japan) Y Tanaka (Japan) Shizuka Tokiwa	2	2
3	(United States) A Frazier (Japan) M Kidowaki	6	6
(United States) L Harvey Wild (United States) M Werdel	6	6
(Japan) M Endo (Japan) M Mizokuchi	1	4
(United States) D Graham (Canada) P Hy	6	2	4
2	(Australia) E Smylie (Czechoslovakia) A Strnadová	3	6	6

Quarterfinals
1	(United States) MJ Fernández (United States) P Shriver	6	6
(Japan) E Iida (Japan) A Nishiya	1	1
4	(Japan) K Date (United States) P Louie Harper	6	7
(Indonesia) Y Basuki (Japan) N Miyagi	2	5
(United States) C Cunningham (Peru) L Gildemeister	6	6
3	(United States) A Frazier (Japan) M Kidowaki	1	2
(United States) L Harvey Wild (United States) M Werdel	6	7^{8}
2	(Australia) E Smylie (Czechoslovakia) A Strnadová	4	6^{6}

Semifinals
1	(United States) MJ Fernández (United States) P Shriver	6	6
4	(Japan) K Date (United States) P Louie Harper	2	1
(United States) C Cunningham (Peru) L Gildemeister	6	6
(United States) L Harvey Wild (United States) M Werdel	2	2

Final
1	(United States) MJ Fernández (United States) P Shriver	6	6
(United States) C Cunningham (Peru) L Gildemeister	3	3
