= 1990 Nichirei International Championships – Doubles =

Doubles
- 1990 Nichirei International Championships

Final
- Champions: (United States) Mary Joe Fernández (United States) Robin White
- Runners-up: (United States) Gigi Fernández (United States) Martina Navratilova
- Score: 4–6, 6–3, 7–6^{(7–4)}

Details
- Draw: 16
- Seeds: 4

Events
Singles	Doubles
Nichirei International Championships	· 1991 →

In the inaugural edition of the tournament, Mary Joe Fernández and Robin White won the title by defeating Gigi Fernández and Martina Navratilova 4–6, 6–3, 7–6^{(7–4)} in the final.

== Seeds ==
1. (United States) Gigi Fernández / (United States) Martina Navratilova (final)
2. (United States) Mary Joe Fernández / (United States) Robin White (champions)
3. (Netherlands) Brenda Schultz / (Socialist Federal Republic of Yugoslavia) Monica Seles (quarterfinals, withdrew)
4. (United States) Cammy MacGregor / (New Zealand) Julie Richardson (quarterfinals)

== Draw ==
=== Key ===
- Q = Qualifier
- WC = Wild card
- LL = Lucky loser
- Alt = Alternate
- SE = Special exempt
- PR = Protected ranking
- ITF = ITF entry
- JE = Junior exempt
- w/o = Walkover
- r = Retired
- d = Defaulted
- SR = Special ranking

=== Draw ===
First round
1	(United States) G Fernández (United States) M Navratilova	6	6
(Japan) E Iida (Japan) M Miyauchi	1	1
(Czechoslovakia) E Švíglerová (Peru) P Vásquez	1	6	0
(Japan) A Nishiya (Japan) K Okamoto	6	0	6
3	(Netherlands) B Schultz (Socialist Federal Republic of Yugoslavia) M Seles	4	6	7
(Switzerland) M Maleeva-Fragnière (Bulgaria) M Maleeva	6	0	5
(Bulgaria) K Maleeva (West Germany) E Pfaff	6	6
(Japan) N Sato (Japan) T Takagi	1	1
(Australia) M Jaggard (United States) M Werdel	3	3
(Japan) M Kidowaki (United States) P Louie Harper	6	6
(United Kingdom) M Javer (United States) A Leand	3	2
4	(United States) Ca MacGregor (New Zealand) J Richardson	6	6
(Japan) M Donoshiro (Japan) A Sugiyama	1	2
(United States) A Frazier (Japan) Y Koizumi	6	6
(Japan) R Hiraki (Argentina) C Tessi	2	6^{4}
2	(United States) MJ Fernández (United States) R White	6	7^{7}

Quarterfinals
1	(United States) G Fernández (United States) M Navratilova	6	6
(Japan) A Nishiya (Japan) K Okamoto	0	1
3	(Netherlands) B Schultz (Socialist Federal Republic of Yugoslavia) M Seles
(Bulgaria) K Maleeva (West Germany) E Pfaff	w/o
(Japan) M Kidowaki (United States) P Louie Harper	6	4	6
4	(United States) Ca MacGregor (New Zealand) J Richardson	4	6	3
(United States) A Frazier (Japan) Y Koizumi	1	4
2	(United States) MJ Fernández (United States) R White	6	6

Semifinals
1	(United States) G Fernández (United States) M Navratilova	6	6
(Bulgaria) K Maleeva (West Germany) E Pfaff	2	0
(Japan) M Kidowaki (United States) P Louie Harper	2	1
2	(United States) MJ Fernández (United States) R White	6	6

Final
1	(United States) G Fernández (United States) M Navratilova	6	3	6^{4}
2	(United States) MJ Fernández (United States) R White	4	6	7^{7}
