= 1991 Nichirei International Championships – Singles =

Singles
- 1991 Nichirei International Championships

Final
- Champion: (Socialist Federal Republic of Yugoslavia) Monica Seles
- Runner-up: (United States) Mary Joe Fernández
- Score: 6–1, 6–1

Details
- Draw: 28 (1WC/4Q)
- Seeds: 8

Events
Singles	Doubles
← 1990 ·	Nichirei International Championships	· 1992 →

Mary Joe Fernández was the defending champion, but lost in the final to Monica Seles. The score was 6–1, 6–1.

== Seeds ==
The first four seeds received a bye to the second round.

1. (Socialist Federal Republic of Yugoslavia) Monica Seles (champion)
2. (United States) Mary Joe Fernández (final)
3. (Bulgaria) Katerina Maleeva (semifinals)
4. (United States) Amy Frazier (semifinals)
5. (Peru) Laura Gildemeister (quarterfinals)
6. (United States) Pam Shriver (first round)
7. (United States) Marianne Werdel (quarterfinals)
8. (Japan) Kimiko Date (first round)

== Draw ==
=== Key ===
- Q = Qualifier
- WC = Wild card
- LL = Lucky loser
- Alt = Alternate
- ITF = ITF entry
- PR = Protected ranking
- SR = Special ranking
- SE = Special exempt
- JE = Junior exempt
- JR = Junior Accelerator Programme entrant
- CO = College Accelerator Programme entrant
- NG = Next Gen Accelerator Program entrant
- w/o = Walkover
- r = Retired
- d = Defaulted

=== Finals ===
Semifinals
1	(Socialist Federal Republic of Yugoslavia) Monica Seles	6	6
4	(United States) Amy Frazier	4	0
3	(Bulgaria) Katerina Maleeva	6	1	4
2	(United States) Mary Joe Fernández	3	6	6

Final
1	(Socialist Federal Republic of Yugoslavia) Monica Seles	6	6
2	(United States) Mary Joe Fernández	1	1

=== Top half ===
First round
Q	(Japan) M Miyauchi	6	4	0
(Japan) R Hiraki	4	6	6
(Japan) M Kidowaki	6	6
(Argentina) C Tessi	2	1
(United States) C Cunningham	2	6	7
8	(Japan) K Date	6	4	5
(Japan) N Sawamatsu	6	6
WC	(Japan) M Endo	3	1
(United States) P Harper	3	7^{7}	6
(United States) L Harvey Wild	6	6^{1}	1
(United States) D Graham	7	6
6	(United States) P Shriver	5	4

Second round
1	(Socialist Federal Republic of Yugoslavia) M Seles	6	6
(Japan) R Hiraki	3	4
(Japan) M Kidowaki	5	7^{7}	6
(United States) C Cunningham	7	6^{4}	1
4	(United States) A Frazier	6	0	6
(Japan) N Sawamatsu	1	6	3
(United States) P Harper	4	4
(United States) D Graham	6	6

Quarterfinals
1	(Socialist Federal Republic of Yugoslavia) M Seles	6	6
(Japan) M Kidowaki	0	0
4	(United States) A Frazier	7	6
(United States) D Graham	5	1

Semifinals
1	(Socialist Federal Republic of Yugoslavia) M Seles	6	6
4	(United States) A Frazier	4	0

=== Bottom half ===
First round
5	(Peru) L Gildemeister	7	7
(Indonesia) Y Basuki	5	5
(United Kingdom) M Javer	3	6	1
(Japan) A Kijimuta	6	2	6
Q	(Japan) E Iida	7^{7}	3	4
(Czechoslovakia) A Strnadová	6^{0}	6	6
7	(United States) M Werdel	6	6
Q	(Japan) N Miyagi	4	3
(Australia) A Minter	6	6
Q	(Japan) M Mizokuchi	2	3
(Australia) E Smylie	0	5
(Canada) P Hy	6	7

Second round
5	(Peru) L Gildemeister	6	6
(Japan) A Kijimuta	1	2
(Czechoslovakia) A Strnadová	1	2
3	(Bulgaria) K Maleeva	6	6
7	(United States) M Werdel	7	7^{7}
(Australia) A Minter	5	6^{3}
(Canada) P Hy	1	1
2	(United States) MJ Fernández	6	6

Quarterfinals
5	(Peru) L Gildemeister	3	6	1
3	(Bulgaria) K Maleeva	6	3	6
7	(United States) M Werdel	2	3
2	(United States) MJ Fernández	6	6

Semifinals
3	(Bulgaria) K Maleeva	6	1	4
2	(United States) MJ Fernández	3	6	6
