= 1991 Arizona Classic – Singles =

Singles
- 1991 Arizona Classic

Final
- Champion: (Belgium) Sabine Appelmans
- Runner-up: (United States) Chanda Rubin
- Score: 7–5, 6–1

Details
- Draw: 32 (4Q)
- Seeds: 8

Events
Singles	Doubles
← 1990 ·	Virginia Slims of Arizona

Conchita Martínez was the defending champion, but did not compete this year.

Sabine Appelmans won the title by defeating Chanda Rubin 7–5, 6–1 in the final.

== Seeds ==
1. (United States) Gigi Fernández (second round)
2. (France) Julie Halard (semifinals)
3. (Belgium) Sabine Appelmans (champion)
4. (United States) Amy Frazier (second round)
5. (United States) Marianne Werdel (first round)
6. (Indonesia) Yayuk Basuki (first round)
7. (Germany) Barbara Rittner (first round)
8. (United States) Debbie Graham (first round)

== Draw ==
=== Key ===
- Q = Qualifier
- WC = Wild card
- LL = Lucky loser
- Alt = Alternate
- SE = Special exempt
- PR = Protected ranking
- ITF = ITF entry
- JE = Junior exempt
- w/o = Walkover
- r = Retired
- d = Defaulted
- SR = Special ranking

=== Finals ===
Semifinals
Q	(United States) Chanda Rubin	6	6
(Czechoslovakia) Karina Habšudová	2	4
3	(Belgium) Sabine Appelmans	3	6	6
2	(France) Julie Halard	6	3	3

Final
Q	(United States) Chanda Rubin	5	1
3	(Belgium) Sabine Appelmans	7	6

=== Top half ===
First round
1	(United States) G Fernández	6	6
(South Africa) E Reinach	2	2
(Germany) S Hack	0	2
(United States) G Helgeson	6	6
Q	(United States) C Rubin	6	6
(Australia) E Smylie	3	0
(United States) P Harper	6^{5}	6	6
6	(Indonesia) Y Basuki	7^{7}	3	2
4	(United States) A Frazier	6	6
(Argentina) F Labat	3	1
(Czechoslovakia) K Habšudová	6	7
Q	(United States) J Emmons	1	5
Q	(United States) K Po	3	7	6
(France) I Demongeot	6	5	3
(United States) T Whitlinger	6	4	7
8	(United States) D Graham	3	6	5

Second round
1	(United States) G Fernández	4	2
(United States) G Helgeson	6	6
Q	(United States) C Rubin	6^{2}	6	6
(United States) P Harper	7^{7}	0	3
4	(United States) A Frazier	3	6^{6}
(Czechoslovakia) K Habšudová	6	7^{8}
Q	(United States) K Po	6	1	6
(United States) T Whitlinger	1	6	2

Quarterfinals
(United States) G Helgeson	3	5
Q	(United States) C Rubin	6	7
(Czechoslovakia) K Habšudová	4	6	6
Q	(United States) K Po	6	1	3

Semifinals
Q	(United States) C Rubin	6	6
(Czechoslovakia) K Habšudová	2	4

=== Bottom half ===
First round
7	(Germany) B Rittner	5	3
(Australia) N Provis	7	6
Q	(United States) R White	6	6
(Germany) V Martinek	3	2
(United States) L Harvey Wild	2	4
(United States) C Cunningham	6	6
(Mexico) A Gavaldón	5	3
3	(Belgium) S Appelmans	7	6
5	(United States) M Werdel	6	4	4
(Austria) P Ritter	2	6	6
(Argentina) C Tessi	6	4	4
(United States) P Fendick	3	6	6
(United States) A Grossman	6	6
(United States) A May	1	3
(United States) S Stafford	2	6	4
2	(France) J Halard	6	3	6

Second round
(Australia) N Provis	7^{8}	6
Q	(United States) R White	6^{6}	1
(United States) C Cunningham	5	0
3	(Belgium) S Appelmans	7	6
(Austria) P Ritter	6^{5}	1
(United States) P Fendick	7^{7}	6
(United States) A Grossman	6	4	4
2	(France) J Halard	3	6	6

Quarterfinals
(Australia) N Provis	6^{5}	4
3	(Belgium) S Appelmans	7^{7}	6
(United States) P Fendick	6	4	1
2	(France) J Halard	4	6	6

Semifinals
3	(Belgium) S Appelmans	3	6	6
2	(France) J Halard	6	3	3
