= 1991 Volvo San Marino Open – Singles =

Singles
- 1991 Volvo San Marino Open

Final
- Champion: (Italy) Katia Piccolini
- Runner-up: (Italy) Silvia Farina
- Score: 6–2, 6–3

Details
- Draw: 32 (1WC/4Q/2LL)
- Seeds: 8

Events
Singles	Doubles
- WTA San Marino

In the first edition of the tournament, Katia Piccolini won the title by defeating Silvia Farina 6–2, 6–3 in the final.

== Seeds ==
1. (Italy) Raffaella Reggi (quarterfinals)
2. (Italy) Katia Piccolini (champion)
3. (United States) Carrie Cunningham (quarterfinals)
4. (West Germany) Sabine Hack (quarterfinals)
5. (Italy) Laura Garrone (second round)
6. (Argentina) Mercedes Paz (second round)
7. (Argentina) Cristina Tessi (second round)
8. (Hungary) Csilla Bartos (second round)

== Draw ==
Key

- Q = Qualifier
- WC = Wild card
- LL = Lucky loser
- Alt = Alternate
- ITF = ITF entry
- PR = Protected ranking
- SR = Special ranking
- SE = Special exempt
- JE = Junior exempt
- JR = Junior Accelerator Programme entrant
- CO = College Accelerator Programme entrant
- NG = Next Gen Accelerator Program entrant
- w/o = Walkover
- r = Retired
- d = Defaulted

=== Finals ===
Semifinals
(Italy) Silvia Farina	6	7^{7}
(Bulgaria) Elena Pampoulova-Wagner	2	6^{5}
(Czechoslovakia) Denisa Szabová	2	1
2	(Italy) Katia Piccolini	6	6

Final
(Italy) Silvia Farina	2	3
2	(Italy) Katia Piccolini	6	6

=== Top half ===
First round
1	(Italy) R Reggi	6	6
(France) N Housset	3	3
(Netherlands) S Rottier	2	0^{r}
(Austria) S Dopfer	6	1
LL	(Italy) L Jachia	6	1	2
(Italy) S Farina	3	6	6
(Italy) F Romano	4	1^{r}
7	(Argentina) C Tessi	6	1
4	(West Germany) S Hack	7	6
(West Germany) S Frankl	5	2
LL	(Japan) A Nishiya	4	3
(Hungary) A Földényi	6	6
(Bulgaria) E Pampoulova-Wagner	6	6
(Australia) L Field	1	3
Q	(Italy) S Lucchi	6	5	3
5	(Italy) L Garrone	4	7	6

Second round
1	(Italy) R Reggi	7^{9}	6
(Austria) S Dopfer	6^{7}	1
(Italy) S Farina	6	6
7	(Argentina) C Tessi	2	1
4	(West Germany) S Hack	6	6
(Hungary) A Földényi	2	1
(Bulgaria) E Pampoulova-Wagner	2	7	6
5	(Italy) L Garrone	6	5	3

Quarterfinals
1	(Italy) R Reggi	1	5
(Italy) S Farina	6	7
4	(West Germany) S Hack	2	0^{r}
(Bulgaria) E Pampoulova-Wagner	6	2

Semifinals
(Italy) S Farina	6	7^{7}
(Bulgaria) E Pampoulova-Wagner	2	6^{5}

=== Bottom half ===
First round
6	(Argentina) M Paz	6	6
Q	(Switzerland) N Tschan	2	3
(Czechoslovakia) D Szabová	6	6
(Netherlands) P Kamstra	2	1
(Soviet Union) E Birioukova	0	1
Q	(Japan) M Miyauchi	6	6
(Netherlands) M Oremans	2	1
3	(United States) C Cunningham	6	6
8	(Hungary) C Bartos	6	6
(Brazil) L Corsato	4	1
Q	(West Germany) A Kerek	6^{5}	3
(Soviet Union) E Maniokova	7^{7}	6
(Italy) L Golarsa	6	6
(Finland) N Dahlman	3	3
WC	(Argentina) M Pérez Roldán	4	1
2	(Italy) K Piccolini	6	6

Second round
6	(Argentina) M Paz	4	5
(Czechoslovakia) D Szabová	6	7
Q	(Japan) M Miyauchi	0	7	1
3	(United States) C Cunningham	6	5	6
8	(Hungary) C Bartos	1	6^{2}
(Soviet Union) E Maniokova	6	7^{7}
(Italy) L Golarsa	2	1
2	(Italy) K Piccolini	6	6

Quarterfinals
(Czechoslovakia) D Szabová	6	6
3	(United States) C Cunningham	2	3
(Soviet Union) E Maniokova	6	6^{7}	4
2	(Italy) K Piccolini	3	7^{9}	6

Semifinals
(Czechoslovakia) D Szabová	2	1
2	(Italy) K Piccolini	6	6
