= 1990 Nichirei International Championships – Singles =

Singles
- 1990 Nichirei International Championships

Final
- Champion: (United States) Mary Joe Fernández
- Runner-up: (United States) Amy Frazier
- Score: 3–6, 6–2, 6–3

Details
- Draw: 28
- Seeds: 8

Events
Singles	Doubles
Nichirei International Championships	· 1991 →

In the inaugural edition of the tournament, Mary Joe Fernández won the title by defeating 18-year-old Amy Frazier 3–6, 6–2, 6–3 in the final.

== Seeds ==
The first four seeds received a bye into the second round.

1. (United States) Martina Navratilova (quarterfinals)
2. (Socialist Federal Republic of Yugoslavia) Monica Seles (quarterfinals)
3. (Bulgaria) Katerina Maleeva (semifinals)
4. (United States) Mary Joe Fernández (champion)
5. (Switzerland) Manuela Maleeva-Fragnière (semifinals)
6. (United States) Jennifer Capriati (quarterfinals)
7. (Czechoslovakia) Helena Suková (quarterfinals)
8. (United States) Amy Frazier (final)

== Draw ==
=== Key ===
- Q = Qualifier
- WC = Wild card
- LL = Lucky loser
- Alt = Alternate
- SE = Special exempt
- PR = Protected ranking
- ITF = ITF entry
- JE = Junior exempt
- w/o = Walkover
- r = Retired
- d = Defaulted
- SR = Special ranking

=== Finals ===
Semifinals
5	(Switzerland) Manuela Maleeva-Fragnière	6	5	4
4	(United States) Mary Joe Fernández	4	7	6
3	(Bulgaria) Katerina Maleeva	5	4
8	(United States) Amy Frazier	7	6

Final
4	(United States) Mary Joe Fernández	3	6	6
8	(United States) Amy Frazier	6	2	3

=== Top half ===
First round
(United States) S Rehe	4	6	6
(United States) R White	6	0	1
(United States) P Louie Harper	6	6
(United States) C MacGregor	3	2
(Japan) T Takagi	0	2
5	(Switzerland) M Maleeva-Fragnière	6	6
(Argentina) C Tessi	6	6
(United Kingdom) M Javer	3	2
(United States) M Werdel	6	6
(Peru) P Vásquez	4	2
(United States) A Leand	2	2
7	(Czechoslovakia) H Suková	6	6

Second round
1	(United States) M Navratilova	6	6
(United States) S Rehe	1	3
(United States) P Louie Harper	2	2
5	(Switzerland) M Maleeva-Fragnière	6	6
4	(United States) MJ Fernández	6	6
(Argentina) C Tessi	3	1
(United States) M Werdel	7^{7}	3	2
7	(Czechoslovakia) H Suková	6^{4}	6	6

Quarterfinals
1	(United States) M Navratilova	5	6	3
5	(Switzerland) M Maleeva-Fragnière	7	4	6
4	(United States) MJ Fernández	6	6
7	(Czechoslovakia) H Suková	3	4

Semifinals
5	(Switzerland) M Maleeva-Fragnière	6	5	4
4	(United States) MJ Fernández	4	7	6

=== Bottom half ===
First round
6	(United States) J Capriati	6	7^{7}
(Japan) M Miyauchi	4	6^{1}
(Bulgaria) M Maleeva	6	6
(Japan) K Okamoto	3	4
(United States) G Fernández	6	6
(Japan) M Kidowaki	0	2
8	(United States) A Frazier	7^{7}	6
(Netherlands) B Schultz	6^{4}	1
(New Zealand) J Richardson	5	3
(Czechoslovakia) E Švíglerová	7	6
(West Germany) E Pfaff	6	6
(Australia) M Jaggard	3	4

Second round
6	(United States) J Capriati	6	6
(Bulgaria) M Maleeva	2	4
(United States) G Fernández	7^{8}	2	2
3	(Bulgaria) K Maleeva	6^{6}	6	6
8	(United States) A Frazier	6	7
(Czechoslovakia) E Švíglerová	2	5
(West Germany) E Pfaff	1	0
2	(Socialist Federal Republic of Yugoslavia) M Seles	6	6

Quarterfinals
6	(United States) J Capriati	6^{4}	6	6^{3}
3	(Bulgaria) K Maleeva	7^{7}	3	7^{7}
8	(United States) A Frazier	5	7	6
2	(Socialist Federal Republic of Yugoslavia) M Seles	7	5	2

Semifinals
3	(Bulgaria) K Maleeva	5	4
8	(United States) A Frazier	7	6
