= 1991 Volvo San Marino Open – Doubles =

Doubles
- 1991 Volvo San Marino Open

Final
- Champions: (Australia) Kerry-Anne Guse (Japan) Akemi Nishiya
- Runners-up: (Italy) Laura Garrone (Argentina) Mercedes Paz
- Score: 6–0, 6–3

Events
Singles	Doubles
WTA San Marino	· 1992 →

In the first edition of the tournament, Kerry-Anne Guse and Akemi Nishiya won the tournament by defeating Laura Garrone and Mercedes Paz 6–0, 6–3 in the final.

== Seeds ==
1. (Italy) Laura Garrone / (Argentina) Mercedes Paz (final)
2. (Italy) Laura Golarsa / (France) Mary Pierce (first round, defaulted)
3. (United States) Carrie Cunningham / (Bulgaria) Elena Pampoulova-Wagner (semifinals)
4. (Australia) Kerry-Anne Guse / (Japan) Akemi Nishiya (champions)

== Draw ==
=== Key ===
- Q = Qualifier
- WC = Wild card
- LL = Lucky loser
- Alt = Alternate
- SE = Special exempt
- PR = Protected ranking
- ITF = ITF entry
- JE = Junior exempt
- w/o = Walkover
- r = Retired
- d = Defaulted
- SR = Special ranking

=== Draw ===
First round
1	(Italy) L Garrone (Argentina) M Paz	6	6
(Hungary) A Földényi (Hungary) Diana Földényi	2	2
(Italy) Giulia Toschi (United States) J Watanabe	3	0
(Australia) J Hodder (Germany) S Schneider	6	6
3	(United States) C Cunningham (Bulgaria) E Pampoulova-Wagner
(Italy) N Baudone (Italy) F Romano	d
(Germany) A Kerek (Italy) K Piccolini	3	6	5
(Germany) S Hack (Argentina) M Pérez Roldán	6	0	7
(Netherlands) M Oremans (Netherlands) S Rottier	2	5
(Brazil) L Corsato (Czechoslovakia) D Szabová	6	7
(Netherlands) I Driehuis (Australia) L Pleming	5	7	2
4	(Australia) KA Guse (Japan) A Nishiya	7	5	6
(Italy) S Farina (Japan) M Miyauchi	6	7^{7}
(Australia) D Jones (Soviet Union) E Maniokova	3	6^{3}
(Finland) N Dahlman (Germany) S Frankl
2	(Italy) L Golarsa (France) M Pierce	d

Quarterfinals
1	(Italy) L Garrone (Argentina) M Paz	6	6
(Australia) J Hodder (Germany) S Schneider	4	2
3	(United States) C Cunningham (Bulgaria) E Pampoulova-Wagner
(Germany) S Hack (Argentina) M Pérez Roldán	d
(Brazil) L Corsato (Czechoslovakia) D Szabová	2	6	1
4	(Australia) KA Guse (Japan) A Nishiya	6	4	6
(Italy) S Farina (Japan) M Miyauchi	6	7
(Finland) N Dahlman (Germany) S Frankl	2	5

Semifinals
1	(Italy) L Garrone (Argentina) M Paz	7	5	7
3	(United States) C Cunningham (Bulgaria) E Pampoulova-Wagner	5	7	5
4	(Australia) KA Guse (Japan) A Nishiya	6	6
(Italy) S Farina (Japan) M Miyauchi	3	4

Final
1	(Italy) L Garrone (Argentina) M Paz	0	3
4	(Australia) KA Guse (Japan) A Nishiya	6	6
