= 1991 Arizona Classic – Doubles =

Doubles
- 1991 Arizona Classic

Final
- Champions: (United States) Peanut Harper (United States) Cammy MacGregor
- Runners-up: (United States) Sandy Collins (South Africa) Elna Reinach
- Score: 7–5, 3–6, 6–3

Details
- Draw: 16 (1Q)
- Seeds: 4

Events
Singles	Doubles
← 1990 ·	Virginia Slims of Arizona

Elise Burgin and Helen Kelesi were the defending champions, but Kelesi did not compete this year. Burgin teamed up with Carrie Cunningham and lost in the first round to Isabelle Demongeot and Patty Fendick.

Peanut Harper and Cammy MacGregor won the title by defeating Sandy Collins and Elna Reinach 7–5, 3–6, 6–3 in the final.

== Seeds ==
1. (Australia) Nicole Provis / (Australia) Elizabeth Smylie (first round)
2. (France) Isabelle Demongeot / (United States) Patty Fendick (semifinals)
3. (United States) Sandy Collins / (South Africa) Elna Reinach (final)
4. (United States) Mary Lou Daniels / (South Africa) Lise Gregory (quarterfinals)

== Draw ==
=== Key ===
- Q = Qualifier
- WC = Wild card
- LL = Lucky loser
- Alt = Alternate
- SE = Special exempt
- PR = Protected ranking
- ITF = ITF entry
- JE = Junior exempt
- w/o = Walkover
- r = Retired
- d = Defaulted
- SR = Special ranking

=== Draw ===
First round
1	(Australia) N Provis (Australia) E Smylie	6	5	5
(Japan) R Hiraki (Argentina) F Labat	2	7	7
Q	(United States) D Graham (United States) K Po	6^{8}	6	7
(United States) A Henricksson (United States) S Stafford	7^{10}	4	5
4	(United States) ML Daniels (South Africa) L Gregory	6	6
(United States) N Arendt (United States) S McCarthy	3	1
(United States) P Harper (United States) Ca MacGregor	6	6
(United States) J Emmons (Sweden) M Lindström	1	3
(South Africa) Lisa Seemann (Finland) P Thorén	4	4
(United States) A Frazier (United States) G Helgeson	6	6
(United States) A Gooden (Czechoslovakia) K Habšudová	4	0
3	(United States) S Collins (South Africa) E Reinach	6	6
(United States) B Bowes (United States) M Werdel	3	6	6
(United States) A Grossman (United States) L Harvey Wild	6	3	0
(United States) E Burgin (United States) C Cunningham	1	7	3
2	(France) I Demongeot (United States) P Fendick	6	5	6

Quarterfinals
(Japan) R Hiraki (Argentina) F Labat	6^{4}	6^{5}
Q	(United States) D Graham (United States) K Po	7^{7}	7^{7}
4	(United States) ML Daniels (South Africa) L Gregory	2	4
(United States) P Harper (United States) Ca MacGregor	6	6
(United States) A Frazier (United States) G Helgeson	3	3
3	(United States) S Collins (South Africa) E Reinach	6	6
(United States) B Bowes (United States) M Werdel	4	4
2	(France) I Demongeot (United States) P Fendick	6	6

Semifinals
Q	(United States) D Graham (United States) K Po	5	2
(United States) P Harper (United States) Ca MacGregor	7	6
3	(United States) S Collins (South Africa) E Reinach	6	6
2	(France) I Demongeot (United States) P Fendick	2	3

Final
(United States) P Harper (United States) Ca MacGregor	7	3	6
3	(United States) S Collins (South Africa) E Reinach	5	6	3
