= 1991 Volvo San Marino Open =

- Date: 15–21 July
- Edition: 1st
- Category: Tier V
- Draw: 32S / 16D
- Prize money: $75,000
- Surface: Clay / outdoor
- Location: City of San Marino, San Marino
- Venue: Centro Sportivo Tennis

Champions

Singles
- (Italy) Katia Piccolini

Doubles
- (Australia) Kerry-Anne Guse / (Japan) Akemi Nishiya
WTA San Marino	· 1992 →

The 1991 Volvo San Marino Open was a women's tennis tournament played on outdoor clay courts at the Centro Sportivo Tennis in the City of San Marino, San Marino that was part of the Tier V category of the 1991 WTA Tour. It was the inaugural edition of the WTA San Marino and was held from 15 July until 21 July 1991. Second-seeded Katia Piccolini won the singles title and earned $13,500 first-prize money.

== Finals ==
=== Singles ===
(Italy) Katia Piccolini defeated (Italy) Silvia Farina 6–2, 6–3

- It was Piccolini's only singles title of her career.

=== Doubles ===
(Australia) Kerry-Anne Guse / (Japan) Akemi Nishiya defeated (Italy) Laura Garrone / (Argentina) Mercedes Paz 6–0, 6–3

== See also ==
- 1991 Campionati Internazionali di San Marino – men's tournament
