= 1991 Arizona Classic =

Tennis tournament held in Arizona

- Date: October 28 – November 3
- Edition: 6th
- Category: Tier IV
- Draw: 32S / 16D
- Prize money: $150,000
- Surface: Hard / outdoor
- Location: Scottsdale, Arizona, U.S.
- Venue: Scottsdale Princess Resort

Champions

Singles
- (Belgium) Sabine Appelmans

Doubles
- (United States) Peanut Louie Harper (United States) Cammy MacGregor
| ← 1990 · | Virginia Slims of Arizona |

The 1991 Arizona Classic was a women's tennis tournament played on outdoor hard courts at the Scottsdale Princess Resort in Scottsdale, Arizona in the United States and was part of Tier IV of the 1991 WTA Tour. It was the sixth, and last, edition of the tournament and was held from October 28 through November 3, 1991. Third-seeded Sabine Appelmans won the singles title and earned $27,000 first-prize money.

== Finals ==
=== Singles ===
(Belgium) Sabine Appelmans defeated (United States) Chanda Rubin 7–5, 6–1

- It was Appelmans' 1st singles of her career.

=== Doubles ===
(United States) Peanut Louie Harper / (United States) Cammy MacGregor defeated (United States) Sandy Collins / (South Africa) Elna Reinach 7–5, 3–6, 6–3
