= 1991 Family Circle Cup =

- Date: April 2–8
- Edition: 19th
- Category: Tier I
- Draw: 56S / 28D
- Prize money: $500,000
- Surface: Clay / outdoor
- Location: Hilton Head Island, SC, U.S.
- Venue: Sea Pines Plantation

Champions

Singles
- (Argentina) Gabriela Sabatini

Doubles
- (Germany) Claudia Kohde-Kilsch (Soviet Union) Natasha Zvereva
← 1990 ·	Family Circle Cup	· 1992 →

The 1991 Family Circle Cup was a women's tennis tournament played on outdoor clay courts at the Sea Pines Plantation on Hilton Head Island, South Carolina in the United States and was part of Tier I of the 1991 WTA Tour. It was the 19th edition of the tournament and ran from April 2 through April 8, 1991. Second-seeded Gabriela Sabatini won the singles title, her first at the event.

== Finals ==
=== Singles ===
(Argentina) Gabriela Sabatini defeated (Soviet Union) Leila Meskhi 6–1, 6–1

- It was Sabatini's 3rd singles title of the year and the 18th of her career.

=== Doubles ===
(Germany) Claudia Kohde-Kilsch / (Soviet Union) Natasha Zvereva defeated (United States) Mary-Lou Daniels / (South Africa) Lise Gregory 6–4, 6–0

- It was Kohde-Kilsch's 2nd doubles title of the year and the 24th of her career. It was Zvereva's 2nd doubles title of the year and the 12th of her career.
