= 1991 Family Circle Cup – Singles =

Singles
- 1991 Family Circle Cup

Final
- Champion: (Argentina) Gabriela Sabatini
- Runner-up: (Soviet Union) Leila Meskhi
- Score: 6–1, 6–1

Details
- Draw: 56 (8Q / 1 WC)
- Seeds: 16

Events
Singles	Doubles
- Family Circle Cup

Gabriela Sabatini defeated Leila Meskhi in the final, 6–1, 6–1 to win the singles tennis title at the 1991 Family Circle Cup.

Martina Navratilova was the defending champion, but lost in the quarterfinals to Meskhi.

== Seeds ==
The top eight seeds received a bye to the second round.

1. (United States) Martina Navratilova (quarterfinal)
2. (Argentina) Gabriela Sabatini (champion)
3. (Spain) Arantxa Sánchez Vicario (semifinal)
4. (Czechoslovakia) Jana Novotná (quarterfinal)
5. (Bulgaria) Katerina Maleeva (second round)
6. (United States) Jennifer Capriati (third round)
7. (Czechoslovakia) Helena Suková (quarterfinal)
8. (Soviet Union) Natalia Zvereva (semifinal)
9. (Soviet Union) Leila Meskhi (final)
10. (Canada) Helen Kelesi (third round)
11. (Italy) Sandra Cecchini (third round)
12. (West Germany) Isabel Cueto (second round)
13. (Czechoslovakia) Regina Rajchrtová (first round)
14. (Argentina) Mercedes Paz (third round)
15. (Italy) Katia Piccolini (first round)
16. (West Germany) Sabine Hack (third round)

== Draw ==
Key

- Q = Qualifier
- WC = Wild card
- LL = Lucky loser
- Alt = Alternate
- ITF = ITF entry
- PR = Protected ranking
- SR = Special ranking
- SE = Special exempt
- JE = Junior exempt
- JR = Junior Accelerator Programme entrant
- CO = College Accelerator Programme entrant
- NG = Next Gen Accelerator Program entrant
- w/o = Walkover
- r = Retired
- d = Defaulted

=== Finals ===
Quarterfinals
1	(United States) Martina Navratilova	4	6	4
9	(Soviet Union) Leila Meskhi	6	2	6
4	(Czechoslovakia) Jana Novotná	6	4
8	(Soviet Union) Natalia Zvereva	7	6
(Italy) Federica Bonsignori	3	2
3	(Spain) Arantxa Sánchez Vicario	6	6
7	(Czechoslovakia) Helena Suková	0	1
2	(Argentina) Gabriela Sabatini	6	6

Semifinals
9	(Soviet Union) Leila Meskhi	6	3	6
8	(Soviet Union) Natalia Zvereva	3	6	4
3	(Spain) Arantxa Sánchez Vicario	6	4	3
2	(Argentina) Gabriela Sabatini	4	6	6

Final
9	(Soviet Union) Leila Meskhi	1	1
2	(Argentina) Gabriela Sabatini	6	6

=== Top half ===
==== Section 1 ====
First round
Q	(West Germany) S Frankl	1	6
(South Africa) A Coetzer	6	7
(Italy) L Garrone	1	1
Q	(South Africa) M de Swardt	6	6
(Czechoslovakia) P Langrová	6	6
15	(Italy) K Piccolini	2	2
9	(Soviet Union) L Meskhi	6	7
(West Germany) V Martinek	4	5
(Czechoslovakia) R Zrubáková	3	6	6
(Soviet Union) E Brioukhovets	6	3	4
(United States) M Daniels	6	6	2
(United States) A Keller	7	3	6

Second round
1	(United States) M Navratilova	6	7
(South Africa) A Coetzer	2	5
Q	(South Africa) M de Swardt	1	2
(Czechoslovakia) P Langrová	6	6
9	(Soviet Union) L Meskhi	6	6
(Czechoslovakia) R Zrubáková	3	2
(United States) A Keller	5	1
6	(United States) J Capriati	7	6

Third round
1	(United States) M Navratilova	6	6
(Czechoslovakia) P Langrová	3	4
9	(Soviet Union) L Meskhi	3	6	6
6	(United States) J Capriati	6	3	3

Quarterfinals
1	(United States) Martina Navratilova	4	6	4
9	(Soviet Union) Leila Meskhi	6	2	6

==== Section 2 ====
First round
LL	(Brazil) L Corsato-Owsianka	2	7	3
(West Germany) C Kohde-Kilsch	6	5	6
Q	(Germany) A Kerek	6	6
(Italy) L Lapi	4	1
(Argentina) F Labat	6	6
13	(Czechoslovakia) R Rajchrtová	0	0
11	(Italy) S Cecchini	6	6
Q	(United States) K Adams	1	0
(Argentina) C Tessi	6	4	2
Q	(United States) B Bowes	3	6	6
(Germany) S Meier	6	6
(United States) D Faber	7	7

Second round
4	(Czechoslovakia) J Novotná	6	6
(West Germany) C Kohde-Kilsch	1	2
Q	(Germany) A Kerek	5	2
(Argentina) F Labat	7	6
11	(Italy) S Cecchini	6	6
Q	(United States) B Bowes	4	0
(United States) D Faber	1	3
8	(Soviet Union) N Zvereva	6	6

Third round
4	(Czechoslovakia) J Novotná	6	6
(Argentina) F Labat	1	1
11	(Italy) S Cecchini	6	3
8	(Soviet Union) N Zvereva	7	6

Quarterfinals
4	(Czechoslovakia) Jana Novotná	6	4
8	(Soviet Union) Natalia Zvereva	7	6

=== Bottom half ===
==== Section 1 ====
First round
(Argentina) P Tarabini	4	2
(Italy) F Bonsignori	6	6
(Poland) R Baranski	7	6
Q	(United States) E Hakami	5	1
(United States) T Whitlinger	2	1
16	(West Germany) S Hack	6	6
12	(West Germany) I Cueto	6	6
Q	(United States) L Allen	0	2
(Greece) A Kanellopoulou	0	6
(United States) H Cioffi	6	7
(Argentina) B Fulco	6	6
(United States) S Schefflin	4	4

Second round
5	(Bulgaria) K Maleeva	7	2	4
(Italy) F Bonsignori	6	6	6
(Poland) R Baranski	1	1
16	(West Germany) S Hack	6	6
12	(West Germany) I Cueto	1	6	4
(United States) H Cioffi	6	4	6
(Argentina) B Fulco	2	3
3	(Spain) A Sánchez Vicario	6	6

Third round
(Italy) F Bonsignori	6	6
16	(West Germany) S Hack	2	4
(United States) H Cioffi	1^{r}
3	(Spain) A Sánchez Vicario	6

Quarterfinals
(Italy) Federica Bonsignori	3	2
3	(Spain) Arantxa Sánchez Vicario	6	6

==== Section 2 ====
First round
WC	(United States) G Helgeson	5	7	7
(United States) S Martin	7	6	6
(Hungary) A Temesvári-Trunkos	6	6
WC	(United States) S Collins	3	3
Q	(Czechoslovakia) L Lásková	4	2
14	(Argentina) M Paz	6	6
10	(Canada) H Kelesi	7	6
(Belgium) S Wasserman	5	4
(Switzerland) C Caverzasio	5	6	6
(United States) C Benjamin	7	2	7
(United States) L Harvey-Wild	6	6
(United Kingdom) S Smith	3	2

Second round
7	(Czechoslovakia) H Suková	6	6
WC	(United States) G Helgeson	2	1
(Hungary) A Temesvári-Trunkos	3	1
14	(Argentina) M Paz	6	6
10	(Canada) H Kelesi	6	1	6
(United States) C Benjamin	1	6	2
(United States) L Harvey-Wild	0	0
2	(Argentina) G Sabatini	6	6

Third round
7	(Czechoslovakia) H Suková	6	6
14	(Argentina) M Paz	4	0
10	(Canada) H Kelesi	3	2
2	(Argentina) G Sabatini	6	6

Quarterfinals
7	(Czechoslovakia) Helena Suková	0	1
2	(Argentina) Gabriela Sabatini	6	6
