= 1990 Nichirei International Championships =

- Date: 25–30 September 1990
- Edition: 1st
- Category: Tier II
- Draw: 28S / 16D
- Prize money: $350,000
- Surface: Hard / outdoor
- Location: Tokyo, Japan
- Venue: Ariake Coliseum

Champions

Singles
- (United States) Mary Joe Fernández

Doubles
- (United States) Mary Joe Fernández / (United States) Robin White
Nichirei International Championships	· 1991 →

The 1990 Nichirei International Championships was a women's tennis tournament played on outdoor hard courts at the Ariake Coliseum in Tokyo, Japan that was part of Tier II of the 1990 WTA Tour. It was the inaugural edition of the tournament and was held from 25 through 30 September 1990. Fourth-seeded Mary Joe Fernández won the singles title and earned $70,000 first-prize money.

== Finals ==
=== Singles ===
(United States) Mary Joe Fernández defeated (United States) Amy Frazier 3–6, 6–2, 6–3

- It was Fernández' first singles title of her career.

=== Doubles ===
(United States) Mary Joe Fernández / (United States) Robin White defeated (United States) Gigi Fernández / (United States) Martina Navratilova 4–6, 6–3, 7–6^{(7–4)}
