= 1991 Citroën Austrian Ladies Open =

- Date: 15–21 July
- Edition: 19th
- Category: Tier IV
- Draw: 32S / 16D
- Prize money: $150,000
- Surface: Clay / outdoor
- Location: Kitzbühel, Austria
- Venue: Casino Stadion

Champions

Singles
- (Spain) Conchita Martínez

Doubles
- (Argentina) Bettina Fulco / (Netherlands) Nicole Jagerman
- WTA Austrian Open

The 1991 Citroën Austrian Ladies Open was a women's tennis tournament played on outdoor clay courts at the Casino Stadion in Kitzbühel, Austria that was part of the Tier IV category of the 1991 WTA Tour. It was the 19th edition of the tournament and was held from 15 July until 21 July 1991. First-seeded Conchita Martínez won the singles title and earned $27,000 first-prize money.

== Finals ==
=== Singles ===
(Spain) Conchita Martínez defeated (Austria) Judith Wiesner 6–1, 2–6, 6–3

- It was Martínez's 2nd singles title of the year and the 9th of her career.

=== Doubles ===
(Argentina) Bettina Fulco / (Netherlands) Nicole Jagerman defeated (Italy) Sandra Cecchini / (Argentina) Patricia Tarabini 7–6, 6–1

- It was Fulco's only doubles title of the year and the 3rd and last of her career. It was Jagerman's only doubles title of the year and the 2nd and last of her career.
