= 1991 Nutri-Metics Bendon Classic =

- Date: 28 January – 3 February
- Edition: 6th
- Category: Tier V
- Draw: 32S / 16D
- Prize money: $100,000
- Surface: Hard / outdoor
- Location: Auckland, New Zealand
- Venue: ASB Tennis Centre

Champions

Singles
- (Czechoslovakia) Eva Švíglerová

Doubles
- (United States) Patty Fendick / (Soviet Union) Larisa Savchenko
← 1990 ·	WTA Auckland Open	· 1992 →

The 1991 Nutri-Metics Bendon Classic was a women's tennis tournament played on outdoor hard courts at the ASB Tennis Centre in Auckland in New Zealand that was part of Tier V of the 1991 WTA Tour. It was the sixth edition of the tournament and was held from 28 January until 3 February 1991. Unseeded Eva Švíglerová won the singles title and earned $18,000 first-prize money.

== Finals ==
=== Singles ===
(Czechoslovakia) Eva Švíglerová defeated (Czechoslovakia) Andrea Strnadová 6–2, 0–6, 6–1

- It was Švíglerová's only WTA singles title of her career.

=== Doubles ===
(United States) Patty Fendick / (Soviet Union) Larisa Savchenko defeated (Australia) Jo-Anne Faull / (New Zealand) Julie Richardson 6–3, 6–3

== Prize money ==
Event	W	F	SF	QF	Round of 16	Round of 32
Singles	$18,000	$8,500	$4,300	$2,175	$1,125	$700

== See also ==
- 1991 Benson and Hedges Open – men's tournament
