= 1991 Nutri-Metics Bendon Classic – Singles =

Singles
- 1991 Nutri-Metics Bendon Classic

Final
- Champion: (Czechoslovakia) Eva Švíglerová
- Runner-up: (Czechoslovakia) Andrea Strnadová
- Score: 6–2, 0–6, 6–1

Details
- Draw: 32 (4Q/2WC)
- Seeds: 8

Events
Singles	Doubles
- WTA Auckland Open

Leila Meskhi was the defending champion, but lost in the first round to Anne Minter.

Eva Švíglerová won the title by defeating Andrea Strnadová 6–2, 0–6, 6–1 in the final.

== Seeds ==
1. (Soviet Union) Leila Meskhi (first round)
2. (Argentina) Mercedes Paz (semifinals)
3. (United States) Gretchen Magers (first round)
4. (Germany) Claudia Porwik (first round)
5. (Germany) Wiltrud Probst (second round)
6. (United States) Ann Grossman (first round)
7. (Germany) Sabine Hack (quarterfinals)
8. (Soviet Union) Larisa Savchenko (quarterfinals)

== Draw ==
Key

- Q = Qualifier
- WC = Wild card
- LL = Lucky loser
- Alt = Alternate
- ITF = ITF entry
- PR = Protected ranking
- SR = Special ranking
- SE = Special exempt
- JE = Junior exempt
- JR = Junior Accelerator Programme entrant
- CO = College Accelerator Programme entrant
- NG = Next Gen Accelerator Program entrant
- w/o = Walkover
- r = Retired
- d = Defaulted

=== Finals ===
Semifinals
Q	(Czechoslovakia) Andrea Strnadová	6	6
(Argentina) Cristina Tessi	0	4
(Czechoslovakia) Eva Švíglerová	6	6
2	(Argentina) Mercedes Paz	2	3

Final
Q	(Czechoslovakia) Andrea Strnadová	2	6	1
(Czechoslovakia) Eva Švíglerová	6	0	6

=== Top half ===
First round
1	(Soviet Union) L Meskhi	4	2
(Australia) A Minter	6	6
Q	(Czechoslovakia) A Strnadová	6	6
WC	(New Zealand) C Toleafoa	0	2
Q	(United States) S Stafford	6	6
(Switzerland) E Zardo	4	4
WC	(New Zealand) J Richardson	5	1
8	(Soviet Union) L Savchenko	7	6
4	(Germany) C Porwik	1	6^{4}
(Argentina) C Tessi	6	7^{7}
(United States) Ca MacGregor	3	7^{8}	6
(United Kingdom) S Gomer	6	6^{6}	1
(Italy) F Romano	3	6	3
(United States) D Faber	6	3	6
(United States) A Henricksson	5	2
5	(Germany) W Probst	7	6

Second round
(Australia) A Minter	2	5
Q	(Czechoslovakia) A Strnadová	6	7
Q	(United States) S Stafford	6^{5}	2
8	(Soviet Union) L Savchenko	7^{7}	6
(Argentina) C Tessi	6	5	6
(United States) Ca MacGregor	4	7	4
(United States) D Faber	6	3	6
5	(Germany) W Probst	4	6	4

Quarterfinals
Q	(Czechoslovakia) A Strnadová	6	6
8	(Soviet Union) L Savchenko	4	1
(Argentina) C Tessi	6	7^{7}
(United States) D Faber	4	6^{5}

Semifinals
Q	(Czechoslovakia) A Strnadová	6	6
(Argentina) C Tessi	0	4

=== Bottom half ===
First round
7	(Germany) S Hack	6	2	7
(New Zealand) B Cordwell	4	6	5
(Hong Kong) P Hy	2	3
Q	(Australia) K Sharpe	6	6
(Czechoslovakia) E Švíglerová	6	6
(Hungary) C Bartos	1	2
(Germany) B Rittner	2	7	6
3	(United States) G Magers	6	5	1
6	(United States) A Grossman	6	6^{4}	1
Q	(Netherlands) P Kamstra	4	7^{7}	6
(Belgium) S Wasserman	2	6	6
(Czechoslovakia) K Habšudová	6	4	0
(France) K Quentrec	6	6
(Australia) L Field	2	3
(Australia) K Godridge	6^{2}	7	4
2	(Argentina) M Paz	7^{7}	5	6

Second round
7	(Germany) S Hack	6	1^{15}
Q	(Australia) K Sharpe	0	0^{15}	r
(Czechoslovakia) E Švíglerová	3	6	6
(Germany) B Rittner	6	4	4
Q	(Netherlands) P Kamstra	6	6
(Belgium) S Wasserman	0	3
(France) K Quentrec	3	2
2	(Argentina) M Paz	6	6

Quarterfinals
7	(Germany) S Hack	7^{7}	5	1
(Czechoslovakia) E Švíglerová	6^{3}	7	6
Q	(Netherlands) P Kamstra	3	r
2	(Argentina) M Paz	4

Semifinals
(Czechoslovakia) E Švíglerová	6	6
2	(Argentina) M Paz	2	3
