= 1991 Nichirei International Championships =

- Date: 16–22 September
- Edition: 2nd
- Category: Tier II
- Draw: 28S / 16D
- Prize money: $350,000
- Surface: Hard / outdoor
- Location: Tokyo, Japan
- Venue: Ariake Coliseum

Champions

Singles
- (Socialist Federal Republic of Yugoslavia) Monica Seles

Doubles
- (United States) Mary Joe Fernández / (United States) Pam Shriver
| ← 1990 · | Nichirei International Championships | · 1992 → |

The 1991 Nichirei International Championships was a women's tennis tournament played on outdoor hard courts at the Ariake Coliseum in Tokyo, Japan that was part of Tier II of the 1991 WTA Tour. It was the second edition of the tournament and was held from 16 September through 22 September 1991. First-seeded Monica Seles won the singles title and earned $70,000 first-prize money.

== Finals ==
=== Singles ===
(Socialist Federal Republic of Yugoslavia) Monica Seles defeated (United States) Mary Joe Fernández 6–1, 6–1

- It was Seles' 7th singles title of the year and the 17th of her career.

=== Doubles ===
(United States) Mary Joe Fernández / (United States) Pam Shriver defeated (United States) Carrie Cunningham / (Peru) Laura Gildemeister 6–3, 6–3
