= 1991 Nutri-Metics Bendon Classic – Doubles =

Doubles
- 1991 Nutri-Metics Bendon Classic

Final
- Champions: (United States) Patty Fendick (Soviet Union) Larisa Savchenko
- Runners-up: (Australia) Jo-Anne Faull (New Zealand) Julie Richardson
- Score: 6–3, 6–3

Details
- Draw: 16 (1Q/1WC)
- Seeds: 4

Events
Singles	Doubles
- WTA Auckland Open

Natalia Medvedeva and Leila Meskhi were the defending champions, but Medvedeva did not compete this year. Meskhi teamed up with Sophie Amiach and lost in the first round to Jo-Anne Faull and Julie Richardson.

Patty Fendick and Larisa Savchenko won the title by defeating Faull and Richardson 6–3, 6–3 in the final.

== Seeds ==
1. (United States) Patty Fendick / (Soviet Union) Larisa Savchenko (champions)
2. (Canada) Jill Hetherington / (United States) Gretchen Magers (semifinals)
3. (Australia) Jo-Anne Faull / (New Zealand) Julie Richardson (final)
4. (New Zealand) Belinda Cordwell / (Australia) Louise Field (first round)

== Draw ==
Key

- Q = Qualifier
- WC = Wild card
- LL = Lucky loser
- Alt = Alternate
- ITF = ITF entry
- PR = Protected ranking
- SR = Special ranking
- SE = Special exempt
- JE = Junior exempt
- JR = Junior Accelerator Programme entrant
- CO = College Accelerator Programme entrant
- NG = Next Gen Accelerator Program entrant
- w/o = Walkover
- r = Retired
- d = Defaulted

=== Draw ===
First round
1	(United States) P Fendick (Soviet Union) L Savchenko	w/o
(Australia) K Godridge (Australia) K Sharpe
(Belgium) A Devries (Hong Kong) P Hy	7	6
Q	(Finland) N Dahlman (Sweden) M Ekstrand	5	2
4	(New Zealand) B Cordwell (Australia) L Field	3	3
(Australia) T Morton (United Kingdom) C Wood	6	6
(Czechoslovakia) A Strnadová (Czechoslovakia) E Švíglerová	6^{3}	6	6
(Sweden) M Strandlund (Belgium) S Wasserman	7^{7}	1	1
WC	(Australia) A Minter (New Zealand) C Toleafoa	7	2	5
(United States) A Henricksson (United States) Ca MacGregor	5	6	7
(France) S Amiach (Soviet Union) L Meskhi	5	3
3	(Australia) JA Faull (New Zealand) J Richardson	7	6
(Czechoslovakia) J Pospisilova (Czechoslovakia) D Szabova	7	3	4
(United States) A Grossman (United States) S Stafford	5	6	6
(Germany) C Porwik (Germany) W Probst	5	5
2	(Canada) J Hetherington (United States) G Magers	7	7

Quarterfinals
1	(United States) P Fendick (Soviet Union) L Savchenko	6	6
(Belgium) A Devries (Hong Kong) P Hy	1	0
(Australia) T Morton (United Kingdom) C Wood	6	6
(Czechoslovakia) A Strnadová (Czechoslovakia) E Švíglerová	4	3
(United States) A Henricksson (United States) Ca MacGregor	4	3
3	(Australia) JA Faull (New Zealand) J Richardson	6	6
(United States) A Grossman (United States) S Stafford	1	4
2	(Canada) J Hetherington (United States) G Magers	6	6

Semifinals
1	(United States) P Fendick (Soviet Union) L Savchenko	6	6
(Australia) T Morton (United Kingdom) C Wood	2	3
3	(Australia) JA Faull (New Zealand) J Richardson	6	4	6
2	(Canada) J Hetherington (United States) G Magers	4	6	3

Final
1	(United States) P Fendick (Soviet Union) L Savchenko	6	6
3	(Australia) JA Faull (New Zealand) J Richardson	3	3
