= 1991 Family Circle Cup – Doubles =

Doubles
- 1991 Family Circle Cup

Final
- Champions: (Germany) Claudia Kohde-Kilsch (Soviet Union) Natasha Zvereva
- Runners-up: (United States) Mary-Lou Daniels (South Africa) Lise Gregory
- Score: 6–4, 6–0

Details
- Draw: 28 (1 Q / 2 WC)
- Seeds: 8

Events
Singles	Doubles
- Family Circle Cup

Martina Navratilova and Arantxa Sánchez Vicario were the defending champions, but they chose not to participate together. Navratilova partnered Pam Shriver, but lost in the quarterfinal to Katrina Adams and Mercedes Paz. Sánchez Vicario played alongside Helena Suková, but lost in the semifinal to Claudia Kohde-Kilsch and Natalia Zvereva.

Kohde-Kilsch and Zvereve went on to win the title, defeating Mary-Lou Daniels and Lise Gregory in the final, 6–4, 6–0.

== Seeds ==
The top four seeds received a bye to the second round.

1. (United States) Gigi Fernández / (Czechoslovakia) Jana Novotná (quarterfinal)
2. (Spain) Arantxa Sánchez Vicario / (Czechoslovakia) Helena Suková (semifinal)
3. (United States) Katrina Adams / (Argentina) Mercedes Paz (semifinal)
4. (West Germany) Claudia Kohde-Kilsch / (Soviet Union) Natalia Zvereva (champions)
5. (United States) Mary-Lou Daniels / (South Africa) Lise Gregory (final)
6. (Canada) Helen Kelesi / (Bulgaria) Katerina Maleeva (first round)
7. (United States) Martina Navratilova / (United States) Pam Shriver (quarterfinal)
8. (Italy) Sandra Cecchini / (Argentina) Patricia Tarabini (quarterfinal)

== Draw ==
Key

- Q = Qualifier
- WC = Wild card
- LL = Lucky loser
- Alt = Alternate
- ITF = ITF entry
- PR = Protected ranking
- SR = Special ranking
- SE = Special exempt
- JE = Junior exempt
- JR = Junior Accelerator Programme entrant
- CO = College Accelerator Programme entrant
- NG = Next Gen Accelerator Program entrant
- w/o = Walkover
- r = Retired
- d = Defaulted

=== Finals ===
Semifinals
5	(United States) Mary-Lou Daniels (South Africa) Lise Gregory	6	6
3	(United States) Katrina Adams (Argentina) Mercedes Paz	4	2
4	(West Germany) Claudia Kohde-Kilsch (Soviet Union) Natalia Zvereva	6	6
2	(Spain) Arantxa Sánchez (Czechoslovakia) Helena Suková	4	2

Final
5	(United States) Mary-Lou Daniels (South Africa) Lise Gregory	4	0
4	(West Germany) Claudia Kohde-Kilsch (Soviet Union) Natalia Zvereva	6	6

=== Top half ===
First round
(United States) C MacGregor (United States) P Mager	4	7	6
(United States) S Collins (Soviet Union) L Meskhi	6	6	3
(South Africa) L Barnard (United States) C Benjamin	3	4
WC	(United States) P O'Reilly (United States) T O'Reilly	6	6
(United States) R Casals (United States) E Hakami	3	6
5	(United States) M Daniels (South Africa) L Gregory	6	7
(Czechoslovakia) P Langrová (Czechoslovakia) R Zrubáková	3	3
(Argentina) F Labat (Czechoslovakia) L Lásková	6	6
(Czechoslovakia) R Rajchrtová (Hungary) A Temesvári-Trunkos	6	6
(West Germany) S Hack (West Germany) S Meier	1	4
(Poland) R Baranski (Argentina) B Fulco	5	4
7	(United States) M Navratilova (United States) P Shriver	7	6

Second round
1	(United States) G Fernández (Czechoslovakia) J Novotná	6	6	6
(United States) C MacGregor (United States) P Mager	7	2	4
WC	(United States) P O'Reilly (United States) T O'Reilly	3	6	2
5	(United States) M Daniels (South Africa) L Gregory	6	1	6
3	(United States) K Adams (Argentina) M Paz	6	6
(Argentina) F Labat (Czechoslovakia) L Lásková	3	0
(Czechoslovakia) R Rajchrtová (Hungary) A Temesvári-Trunkos	4	4
7	(United States) M Navratilova (United States) P Shriver	6	6

Quarterfinals
1	(United States) G Fernández (Czechoslovakia) J Novotná	4	6	6
5	(United States) M Daniels (South Africa) L Gregory	6	2	7
3	(United States) K Adams (Argentina) M Paz	3	6	6
7	(United States) M Navratilova (United States) P Shriver	6	4	3

Semifinals
5	(United States) Mary-Lou Daniels (South Africa) Lise Gregory	6	6
3	(United States) Katrina Adams (Argentina) Mercedes Paz	4	2

=== Bottom half ===
First round
8	(Italy) S Cecchini (Argentina) P Tarabini	6	4	6
(United States) G Helgeson (United States) T Whittington	3	6	2
(France) S Amiach (Sweden) M Lindström	3	6	3
(Soviet Union) E Brioukhovets (Netherlands) H ter Riet	6	4	6
Q	(United States) L Harvey-Wild (United States) A Keller	6	6
(United States) D Faber (United States) L Spadea	2	4
6	(Canada) H Kelesi (Bulgaria) K Maleeva	4	4
(United States) J Capriati (Argentina) G Sabatini	6	6
(Brazil) L Corsato-Owsianka (Italy) S Farina	3	7	6
(Italy) L Garrone (United Kingdom) S Smith	6	6	1
(United States) N Sodupe (United States) A Schwartz	2	4
WC	(United States) L Allen (United States) J Emmons	6	6

Second round
8	(Italy) S Cecchini (Argentina) P Tarabini	6	6
(Soviet Union) E Brioukhovets (Netherlands) H ter Riet	3	1
Q	(United States) L Harvey-Wild (United States) A Keller	3	5
4	(West Germany) C Kohde-Kilsch (Soviet Union) N Zvereva	6	7
(United States) J Capriati (Argentina) G Sabatini	6	6
(Brazil) L Corsato-Owsianka (Italy) S Farina	0	2
WC	(United States) L Allen (United States) J Emmons	2	1
2	(Spain) A Sánchez Vicario (Czechoslovakia) H Suková	6	6

Quarterfinals
8	(Italy) S Cecchini (Argentina) P Tarabini	1	3
4	(West Germany) C Kohde-Kilsch (Soviet Union) N Zvereva	6	6
(United States) J Capriati (Argentina) G Sabatini	3	6	2
2	(Spain) A Sánchez Vicario (Czechoslovakia) H Suková	6	3	6

Semifinals
4	(West Germany) Claudia Kohde-Kilsch (Soviet Union) Natalia Zvereva	6	6
2	(Spain) Arantxa Sánchez Vicario (Czechoslovakia) Helena Suková	4	2
