= 1990 Arizona Classic =

Tennis tournament held in Arizona

- Date: October 15–21
- Edition: 5th
- Category: Tier IV
- Draw: 32S / 16D
- Prize money: $150,000
- Surface: Hard / outdoor
- Location: Scottsdale, Arizona, U.S.
- Venue: Scottsdale Princess

Champions

Singles
- (Spain) Conchita Martínez

Doubles
- (United States) Elise Burgin / (Canada) Helen Kelesi
← 1989 ·	Virginia Slims of Arizona	· 1991 →

The 1990 Arizona Classic was a women's tennis tournament played on outdoor hard courts at the Scottsdale Princess in Scottsdale, Arizona in the United States and was part of Tier IV of the 1990 WTA Tour. It was the fifth edition of the tournament and was held from October 15 through October 21, 1990. First-seeded Conchita Martínez won the singles title and earned $27,000 first-prize money.

== Finals ==
=== Singles ===
(Spain) Conchita Martínez defeated (United States) Marianne Werdel 7–5, 6–1

- It was Martínez' 2nd singles of the year and the 6th of her career.

=== Doubles ===
(United States) Elise Burgin / (Canada) Helen Kelesi defeated (United States) Sandy Collins / (United States) Ronni Reis 6–4, 6–2
