= Akemi Nishiya =

Japanese tennis player (born 1965)

- Full name: Akemi Nishiya-Kinoshita
- Country (sports): Japan
- Born: 11 March 1965 (age 61) Tokyo, Japan
- Plays: Right-handed
- Prize money: $105,832

Singles
- Career record: 91–116
- Highest ranking: No. 112 (10 April 1989)

Grand Slam singles results
- Australian Open: 2R (1988, 1989)
- French Open: 1R (1989)
- Wimbledon: 1R (1989)

Doubles
- Career record: 64–80
- Career titles: 1 WTA
- Highest ranking: No. 61 (23 September 1991)

Grand Slam doubles results
- Australian Open: 2R (1988, 1991)
- French Open: 1R (1989)
- Wimbledon: 1R (1989, 1991)
- US Open: 2R (1991)

Akemi Nishiya-Kinoshita (born 11 March 1965) is a former professional tennis player from Japan.

== Biography ==
Nishiya, who comes from Tokyo, played collegiate tennis at Pepperdine University in 1984.

As a singles player on the professional tour, she reached a highest ranking of 112 in the world. She had a win over Pascale Paradis at the 1988 Australian Open and also competed in the main draws of the French Open and Wimbledon Championships. On the WTA Tour, her best singles performance was a quarter-final appearance at the 1988 OTB Open, held in Schenectady.

Her only WTA title came in doubles, partnering Kerry-Anne Guse at the 1991 Volvo San Marino Open. They defeated top seeds Laura Garrone and Mercedes Paz in the final. She was ranked as high as 61 in doubles and appeared in the main draw of all four grand slam tournaments.

Since being married, she is known as Akemi Kinoshita and she is now a New York-based tennis coach.

== Grand Slam tournaments Performance timeline ==
Key
W	F	SF	QF	#R	RR	Q#	DNQ	A	NH

(W) winner; (F) finalist; (SF) semifinalist; (QF) quarterfinalist; (#R) rounds 4, 3, 2, 1; (RR) round-robin stage; (Q#) qualification round; (DNQ) did not qualify; (A) absent; (NH) not held; (SR) strike rate (events won / competed); (W–L) win–loss record.

=== Singles ===
Tournament	1988	1989	SR	W–L	Win %
Australian Open	2R	2R	/	–	–
French Open		1R	/	–	–
Wimbledon			/	–	–
US Open			/	–	–
Win–loss			/	–	–

=== Doubles ===
Tournament	1988	1989	1990	1991	SR	W–L	Win %
Australian Open					/	–	–
French Open					/	–	–
Wimbledon					/	–	–
US Open					/	–	–
Win–loss					/	–	–

== WTA Tour finals ==
=== Doubles (1-1) ===
Result	Date	Tournament	Tier	Surface	Partner	Opponents	Score
Loss	April, 1991	Pattaya, Thailand	Tier V	Hard	(Japan) Rika Hiraki	(Japan) Nana Miyagi (Indonesia) Suzanna Wibowo	1–6, 4–6
Win	July, 1991	San Marino	Tier V	Clay	(Australia) Kerry-Anne Guse	(Italy) Laura Garrone (Argentina) Mercedes Paz	6–0, 6–3

== ITF finals ==
$25,000 tournaments
$10,000 tournaments

=== Singles (1–1) ===
Result	No.	Date	Tournament	Surface	Opponent	Score
Win	1.	28 July 1985	Columbus, United States	Hard	(United States) Marianne Werdel	6–0, 7–6
Loss	1.	4 August 1985	Chatham, United States	Hard	(United States) Caroline Kuhlman	2–6, 2–6

=== Doubles (1–2) ===
Result	No.	Date	Tournament	Surface	Partner	Opponents	Score
Loss	1.	15 July 1985	Detroit, United States	Clay	(United States) Anne Grousbeck	(United States) Cammy MacGregor (United States) Cynthia MacGregor	3–6, 6–2, 2–6
Loss	2.	15 September 1985	Hopewell, United States	Clay	(Australia) Louise Field	(United States) Diane Farrell (United States) Jenni Goodling	6–2, 5–7, 4–6
Win	1.	11 October 1987	Kofu, Japan	Hard	(Japan) Ei Iida	(Japan) Kumiko Okamoto (Japan) Naoko Sato	7–5, 6–2
