= Carrie Cunningham =

American surgeon and former tennis player

- Country (sports): United States
- Born: April 28, 1972 (age 54)
- Turned pro: 1987
- Retired: 1994
- Plays: Left-handed
- Prize money: $317,652

Singles
- Career record: 81–84
- Career titles: 0 WTA, 1 ITF
- Highest ranking: No. 38 (February 18, 1991)

Grand Slam singles results
- Australian Open: 3R (1991)
- French Open: 3R (1991)
- Wimbledon: 2R (1989, 1990, 1991)
- US Open: 4R (1992)
- US Open Junior: W (1988)

Doubles
- Career record: 21–44
- Career titles: 0
- Highest ranking: No. 56 (December 9, 1991)

Grand Slam doubles results
- Australian Open: 1R (1992)
- French Open: 1R (1991, 1992)
- US Open: 2R (1992)

Carrie Cunningham (born April 28, 1972) is an American surgeon and former professional tennis player who played on the Women's Tennis Association (WTA) Circuit from 1987 until 1994. She has served as president of the Association for Academic Surgery.

== Career singles highlights ==
Cunningham's career highlights include a world ranking of 32 in 1991, ending the year with a rank of 51 after reaching the third rounds of both the Australian and French Opens.

Her best Grand Slam performance was attaining the 4th round (round of 16) at the 1992 US Open, losing to eventual semi-finalist Manuela Maleeva-Fragniere, 6–3, 7–5. She reached the second round in Wimbledon from 1989-1991. She also holds one Grand Slam Junior title - the US Junior Open Championship in 1988.

== Doubles highlights ==
Cunningham was also on the doubles circuit, reaching one WTA final - the 1991 Tokyo International, with doubles partner Laura Gildemeister, losing 6–3, 6–3 to the team of Pam Shriver and Mary Joe Fernandez. She does hold a USTA Girls’ 18 National Championship doubles title, when she teamed with Andrea Farley to capture the 1988 crown on clay courts.

== Court habits and influence ==
Cunningham had a habit of sometimes grunting during her play. In fact, former world #1 Monica Seles cites Cunningham for starting her own grunting habit, after Seles lost a finals match to Cunningham in 1986. Said Seles, "it has been part of me since I was 12 when I played Carrie Cunningham in one of the finals and I started doing that. Since then, it has been always with me each year at Wimbledon."

== Earnings ==
Cunningham's career earnings on the professional tour totaled $318,541.

== Post tennis career ==
Cunningham pursued a career in medicine and surgery. She is on the faculty of Harvard Medical School and is an attending surgeon at the Massachusetts General Hospital in Boston, Massachusetts. She graduated from University of Michigan and Harvard School of Public Health.

As the President of the Association for Academic Surgery, Cunningham advocates for heightened awareness and enhanced mental health practices among physicians, aiming to address the concerning rates of mental health issues and suicides within the profession. During her address at the Association's annual conference in 2023, she candidly shared her personal battle with depression and substance abuse as a poignant example of the need for such initiatives.

== Career finals ==
=== Doubles (0–1) ===
Winner – Legend Grand Slam tournaments (0–0) WTA Tour Championships (0–0) Tier I (0–0) Tier II (0–1) Tier III (0–0) Tier IV (0–0) Tier V (0–0)	Titles by surface Hard (0–1) Grass (0–0) Clay (0–0) Carpet (0–0)

Result	W/L	Date	Tournament	Surface	Partner	Opponents	Score
Loss	0–1	Sep 1991	Tokyo, Japan	Hard	(Peru) Laura Arraya	(United States) Mary Joe Fernández (United States) Pam Shriver	3–6, 3–6

Sporting positions
Preceded by (Soviet Union) Natalia Zvereva	Orange Bowl Girls' Singles Champion; Category: 18 and under 1989	Succeeded by (United States) Luanne Spadea
