= Cristina Tessi =

Argentine tennis player

- Full name: Cristina Tessi
- Country (sports): Argentina
- Born: 20 July 1972 (age 52); Ingeniero Maschwitz
- Prize money: $130,417

Singles
- Highest ranking: No. 56 (15 July 1991)

Grand Slam singles results
- Australian Open: 1R (1991, 1992)
- French Open: 2R (1991, 1992)
- Wimbledon: 2R (1992)
- US Open: 1R (1991)

Doubles
- Highest ranking: No. 206 (7 November 1988)

Cristina Tessi (born 20 July 1972) is a former professional tennis player from Argentina.

== Biography ==
Tessi, who comes from Ingeniero Maschwitz, began to play tennis at the age of three and as a child was taught by her father Atilio and brother Ricardo.

=== Tennis career ===
Excelling as a teenager, she topped the world rankings for juniors in 1988, which led to calls in the press that she would be the next Gabriela Sabatini. As a 15 year old she made the quarter-finals of the doubles in her debut WTA Tour tournament, the 1987 Argentine Open, partnering Florencia Labat.

Tessi played in a Fed Cup tie for Argentina in 1988, against Greece in Melbourne, which they won 3–0, with Tessi and Mercedes Paz winning a dead rubber doubles match.

Over the next few years her ranking steadily improved with her first WTA Tour singles quarter-final coming at Guaruja in 1989 and another at São Paulo in 1990, beating Mary Pierce en route. She ended 1990 by winning three matches to make the quarter-finals at the end of year Danone Open in Brisbane. Her best WTA Tour performance came early in 1991 when she reached the semi-finals at Auckland. At the 1991 Italian Open she had a win over Claudia Kohde-Kilsch and lost a close two set match to fellow young talent Jennifer Capriati. Later in the 1991 season she made the quarter-finals in Palermo to reach her career best ranking of 56 in the world.

She featured in the main draw of all four grand slam tournaments in her career and made the second round of both the French Open and Wimbledon in 1992. Her second round loss to Akiko Kijimuta at the 1992 Wimbledon Championships went deep into the third set, eventually decided 6–8. Not long after her Wimbledon appearance she injured an abductor and decided to return to school. She didn't her tennis career until she completed her studies and when she came back it was with a limited impact, only featuring in lower level ITF tournaments.

=== Life after tennis ===
Tessi is now a clinical doctor in Buenos Aires with endocrinology as a specialty.

== ITF finals ==
$25,000 tournaments
$10,000 tournaments

=== Singles (3–0) ===
Result	No.	Date	Tournament	Surface	Opponent	Score
Win	1.	29 November 1987	Buenos Aires, Argentina	Clay	(Argentina) Gaby Castro	6–3, 6–1
Win	2.	16 July 1990	Darmstadt, West Germany	Clay	(Soviet Union) Viktoria Milvidskaia	6–1, 7–6
Win	3.	22 November 1993	Buenos Aires, Argentina	Clay	(Paraguay) Larissa Schaerer	2–6, 7–5, 6–4

=== Doubles (0–1) ===
Result	No.	Date	Tournament	Surface	Partner	Opponents	Score
Loss	1.	28 September 1988	Detroit, United States	Hard	(Uruguay) Patricia Miller	(United States) Jennifer Fuchs (Australia) Robyn Lamb	1–6, 6–7
