= 1993 Virginia Slims of Los Angeles – Doubles =

Doubles
- 1993 Virginia Slims of Los Angeles

Final
- Champions: (Spain) Arantxa Sánchez Vicario (Czech Republic) Helena Suková
- Runners-up: (United States) Gigi Fernández (Belarus) Natasha Zvereva
- Score: 7–6^{(7–3)}, 6–3

Details
- Draw: 28 (1WC/1Q/2LL)
- Seeds: 8

Events
Singles	Doubles
← 1992 ·	LA Women's Tennis Championships	· 1994 →

Arantxa Sánchez Vicario and Helena Suková successfully defended their title by defeating Gigi Fernández and Natasha Zvereva 7–6^{(7–3)}, 6–3 in the final.

== Seeds ==
The first four seeds received a bye to the second round.

1. (United States) Gigi Fernández / (Belarus) Natasha Zvereva (final)
2. (Spain) Arantxa Sánchez Vicario / (Czech Republic) Helena Suková (champion)
3. (United States) ~~Pam Shriver~~ / (Australia) ~~Elizabeth Smylie~~ (withdrew)
4. (United States) Zina Garrison Jackson / (United States) Kathy Rinaldi (quarterfinals)
5. (South Africa) Amanda Coetzer / (Bulgaria) Magdalena Maleeva (first round)
6. (United States) Debbie Graham / (South Africa) Rosalyn Nideffer (second round)
7. (United States) Lindsay Davenport / (United States) Robin White (semifinals)
8. (Australia) Rachel McQuillan / (Germany) Claudia Porwik (semifinals)

== Draw ==
Key

- Q = Qualifier
- WC = Wild card
- LL = Lucky loser
- Alt = Alternate
- ITF = ITF entry
- PR = Protected ranking
- SR = Special ranking
- SE = Special exempt
- JE = Junior exempt
- JR = Junior Accelerator Programme entrant
- CO = College Accelerator Programme entrant
- NG = Next Gen Accelerator Program entrant
- w/o = Walkover
- r = Retired
- d = Defaulted

=== Finals ===
Semifinals
1	(United States) Gigi Fernández (Belarus) Natasha Zvereva	4	6	6
7	(United States) Lindsay Davenport (United States) Robin White	6	4	3
8	(Australia) Rachel McQuillan (Germany) Claudia Porwik	2	2
2	(Spain) Arantxa Sánchez Vicario (Czech Republic) Helena Suková	6	6

Final
1	(United States) Gigi Fernández (Belarus) Natasha Zvereva	6^{3}	3
2	(Spain) Arantxa Sánchez Vicario (Czech Republic) Helena Suková	7^{7}	6

=== Top half ===
First round
(United States) J Emmons (South Africa) T Price	6	7
WC	(United States) P Harper (United States) G Magers	2	5
(United States) Ca MacGregor (United States) S Stafford	3	6	6
(Japan) R Hiraki (Austria) P Ritter	6	2	1
(United States) E deLone (France) S Testud	3	4
6	(United States) D Graham (South Africa) R Nideffer	6	6
(New Zealand) J Richardson (United Kingdom) C Wood	7^{10}	2	2
(United States) N Arendt (Australia) K Radford	6^{8}	6	6
(United Kingdom) J Durie (Australia) M Jaggard-Lai	7	7
LL	(Australia) T Morton (Israel) Y Segal	5	5
(Finland) N Dahlman (United Kingdom) V Lake	1	2
7	(United States) L Davenport (United States) R White	6	6

Second round
1	(United States) G Fernández (Belarus) N Zvereva	6	4	6
(United States) J Emmons (South Africa) T Price	1	6	3
(United States) Ca MacGregor (United States) S Stafford	6	4	7^{7}
6	(United States) D Graham (South Africa) R Nideffer	4	6	6^{1}
LL	(Italy) N Baudone (Germany) R Kochta	4	0
(United States) N Arendt (Australia) K Radford	6	6
(United Kingdom) J Durie (Australia) M Jaggard-Lai	3	6	1
7	(United States) L Davenport (United States) R White	6	4	6

Quarterfinals
1	(United States) G Fernández (Belarus) N Zvereva	6	6
(United States) Ca MacGregor (United States) S Stafford	3	1
(United States) N Arendt (Australia) K Radford	1	7^{7}	1
7	(United States) L Davenport (United States) R White	6	6^{4}	6

Semifinals
1	(United States) G Fernández (Belarus) N Zvereva	4	6	6
7	(United States) L Davenport (United States) R White	6	4	3

=== Bottom half ===
First round
8	(Australia) R McQuillan (Germany) C Porwik	6	6
Q	(Australia) J Byrne (Australia) L Field	1	3
(France) J Halard (Bulgaria) K Maleeva	4	4
(United States) C Benjamin (Argentina) MJ Gaidano	6	6
(Indonesia) Y Basuki (Japan) N Miyagi	7^{7}	7
(Italy) L Golarsa (France) C Suire	6^{4}	5
5	(South Africa) A Coetzer (Bulgaria) M Maleeva	6^{3}	3
(Ukraine) E Brioukhovets (Ukraine) N Medvedeva	7^{7}	6
(United States) L Allen (United States) A Henricksson	2	4
(United States) L McNeil (Argentina) G Sabatini	6	6
(United States) A Keller (Australia) N Pratt	3	6^{4}
(United States) C Kuhlman (United States) K Po	6	7^{7}

Second round
8	(Australia) R McQuillan (Germany) C Porwik	6	6
(United States) C Benjamin (Argentina) MJ Gaidano	3	2
(Indonesia) Y Basuki (Japan) N Miyagi	4	3
4	(United States) Z Garrison Jackson (United States) K Rinaldi	6	6
(Ukraine) E Brioukhovets (Ukraine) N Medvedeva	5	3
(United States) L McNeil (Argentina) G Sabatini	7	6
(United States) C Kuhlman (United States) K Po	7^{7}	0	2
2	(Spain) A Sánchez Vicario (Czech Republic) H Suková	6^{4}	6	6

Quarterfinals
8	(Australia) R McQuillan (Germany) C Porwik	7^{7}	6^{4}	6
4	(United States) Z Garrison Jackson (United States) K Rinaldi	6^{4}	7^{7}	2
(United States) L McNeil (Argentina) G Sabatini	6	3	4
2	(Spain) A Sánchez Vicario (Czech Republic) H Suková	1	6	6

Semifinals
8	(Australia) R McQuillan (Germany) C Porwik	2	2
2	(Spain) A Sánchez Vicario (Czech Republic) H Suková	6	6
