= 1993 Virginia Slims of Los Angeles – Singles =

Singles
- 1993 Virginia Slims of Los Angeles

Final
- Champion: (United States) Martina Navratilova
- Runner-up: (Spain) Arantxa Sánchez Vicario
- Score: 7–5, 7–6^{(7–4)}

Details
- Draw: 56 (3WC/8Q)
- Seeds: 16

Events
Singles	Doubles
← 1992 ·	LA Women's Tennis Championships	· 1994 →

Martina Navratilova successfully defended her title by defeating Arantxa Sánchez Vicario 7–5, 7–6^{(7–4)} in the final.

== Seeds ==
The first eight seeds received a bye to the second round.

1. (Spain) Arantxa Sánchez Vicario (final)
2. (United States) Martina Navratilova (champion)
3. (Argentina) Gabriela Sabatini (semifinals)
4. (Bulgaria) Magdalena Maleeva (quarterfinals)
5. (Czech Republic) Helena Suková (third round)
6. (France) Mary Pierce (third round)
7. (South Africa) Amanda Coetzer (quarterfinals)
8. (United States) Zina Garrison Jackson (quarterfinals)
9. (Bulgaria) Katerina Maleeva (first round)
10. (United States) Lori McNeil (semifinals)
11. (United States) Lindsay Davenport (third round)
12. (United States) Gigi Fernández (first round)
13. (Indonesia) Yayuk Basuki (second round)
14. (France) Julie Halard (third round)
15. (United States) Lisa Raymond (first round)
16. (Mexico) Angélica Gavaldón (third round)

== Draw ==
Key

- Q = Qualifier
- WC = Wild card
- LL = Lucky loser
- Alt = Alternate
- ITF = ITF entry
- PR = Protected ranking
- SR = Special ranking
- SE = Special exempt
- JE = Junior exempt
- JR = Junior Accelerator Programme entrant
- CO = College Accelerator Programme entrant
- NG = Next Gen Accelerator Program entrant
- w/o = Walkover
- r = Retired
- d = Defaulted

=== Finals ===
Quarterfinals
1	(Spain) Arantxa Sánchez Vicario	6	3	6
8	(United States) Zina Garrison Jackson	3	6	2
4	(Bulgaria) Magdalena Maleeva	6	6^{4}	5
10	(United States) Lori McNeil	1	7^{7}	7
(United States) Kimberly Po	4	2
3	(Argentina) Gabriela Sabatini	6	6
7	(South Africa) Amanda Coetzer	1	1
2	(United States) Martina Navratilova	6	6

Semifinals
1	(Spain) Arantxa Sánchez Vicario	7	6
10	(United States) Lori McNeil	5	2
3	(Argentina) Gabriela Sabatini	1	1
2	(United States) Martina Navratilova	6	6

Final
1	(Spain) Arantxa Sánchez Vicario	5	6^{4}
2	(United States) Martina Navratilova	7	7^{7}

=== Top half ===
==== Section 1 ====
First round
(Australia) M Jaggard-Lai	6^{5}	6	6
Q	(United States) A Mall	7^{7}	4	2
(Belarus) T Ignatieva	7^{7}	4	3
(United Kingdom) C Wood	6^{4}	6	6
(United States) R White	2	2
14	(France) J Halard	6	6
11	(United States) L Davenport	6	6
(Germany) C Porwik	4	2
(Hungary) A Temesvári	2	6	3
(Italy) N Baudone	6	3	6
(Australia) R McQuillan	4	2
Q	(United States) A Keller	6	6

Second round
1	(Spain) A Sánchez Vicario	6	6
(Australia) M Jaggard-Lai	1	2
(United Kingdom) C Wood	2	1
14	(France) J Halard	6	6
11	(United States) L Davenport	6	6
(Italy) N Baudone	2	1
Q	(United States) A Keller	3	4
8	(United States) Z Garrison Jackson	6	6

Third round
1	(Spain) A Sánchez Vicario	6	6^{4}	6
14	(France) J Halard	4	7^{7}	0
11	(United States) L Davenport	3	6^{5}
8	(United States) Z Garrison Jackson	6	7^{7}

Quarterfinals
1	(Spain) A Sánchez Vicario	6	3	6
8	(United States) Z Garrison Jackson	3	6	2

==== Section 2 ====
First round
(United States) C Kuhlman	5	3
(Italy) L Golarsa	7	6
(South Africa) J Kruger	3	6	6
Q	(United States) A Henricksson	6	4	3
(Paraguay) R de los Ríos	1	0
16	(Mexico) A Gavaldón	6	6
10	(United States) L McNeil	7	6
(France) K Quentrec	5	3
(United States) T Whitlinger	6	6
(United States) N Arendt	1	2
WC	(United States) D Scott	7^{7}	7^{7}
(United Kingdom) J Durie	6^{5}	6^{5}

Second round
4	(Bulgaria) M Maleeva	6	6
(Italy) L Golarsa	3	4
(South Africa) J Kruger	0	2
16	(Mexico) A Gavaldón	6	6
10	(United States) L McNeil	6	6
(United States) T Whitlinger	1	2
WC	(United States) D Scott	1	2
5	(Czech Republic) H Suková	6	6

Third round
4	(Bulgaria) M Maleeva	7^{9}	6
16	(Mexico) A Gavaldón	6^{7}	4
10	(United States) L McNeil	6	6^{2}	6
5	(Czech Republic) H Suková	4	7^{7}	2

Quarterfinals
4	(Bulgaria) M Maleeva	6	6^{4}	5
10	(United States) L McNeil	1	7^{7}	7

=== Bottom half ===
==== Section 3 ====
First round
(Australia) E Smylie	6	6
Q	(United States) J Watanabe	0	3
(United States) S Stafford	3	3
(Finland) N Dahlman	6	6
(United States) K Po	6^{5}	6	6
15	(United States) L Raymond	7^{7}	4	1
12	(United States) G Fernández	3	4
WC	(United States) T Austin	6	6
Q	(Australia) L Field	4	2
Q	(Kazakhstan) E Likhovtseva	6	6
(Australia) K Radford	2	2
(United States) K Rinaldi	6	6

Second round
6	(France) M Pierce	6	6
(Australia) E Smylie	4	3
(Finland) N Dahlman	4	4
(United States) K Po	6	6
WC	(United States) T Austin	4	6	7
Q	(Kazakhstan) E Likhovtseva	6	3	5
(United States) K Rinaldi	3	6^{2}
3	(Argentina) G Sabatini	6	7^{7}

Third round
6	(France) M Pierce	4	4
(United States) K Po	6	6
WC	(United States) T Austin	1	3
3	(Argentina) G Sabatini	6	6

Quarterfinals
(United States) K Po	4	2
3	(Argentina) G Sabatini	6	6

==== Section 4 ====
First round
(Japan) R Hiraki	6	6
WC	(United States) K Phebus	2	0
(Canada) H Kelesi	7^{7}	6
(Australia) T Morton	6^{4}	4
Q	(United States) L Allen	6	3	2
13	(Indonesia) Y Basuki	3	6	6
9	(Bulgaria) K Maleeva	6^{5}	6	6
(South Africa) R Nideffer	7^{7}	4	4
Q	(South Africa) T Price	5	7^{8}	5
(Czech Republic) A Strnadová	7	6^{6}	7
(Greece) C Papadáki	2	1
(Ukraine) E Briouhkovets	6	6

Second round
7	(South Africa) A Coetzer	7^{9}	6
(Japan) R Hiraki	6^{7}	4
(Canada) H Kelesi	7^{7}	6
13	(Indonesia) Y Basuki	6^{5}	3
(South Africa) R Nideffer	6	3	6
(Czech Republic) A Strnadová	2	6	1
(Ukraine) E Briouhkovets	2	2
2	(United States) M Navratilova	6	6

Third round
7	(South Africa) A Coetzer	6	6^{4}	6
(Canada) H Kelesi	4	7^{7}	2
(South Africa) R Nideffer	4	1
2	(United States) M Navratilova	6	6

Quarterfinals
7	(South Africa) A Coetzer	1	1
2	(United States) M Navratilova	6	6
