= 1991 Virginia Slims of Los Angeles – Singles =

Singles
- 1991 Virginia Slims of Los Angeles

Final
- Champion: (Socialist Federal Republic of Yugoslavia) Monica Seles
- Runner-up: (Japan) Kimiko Date
- Score: 6–3, 6–1

Details
- Draw: 56
- Seeds: 16

Events
Singles	Doubles
← 1990 ·	LA Women's Tennis Championships	· 1992 →

Monica Seles was the defending champion and successfully defended her title, by defeating Kimiko Date 6–3, 6–1 in the final. Despite the win, Seles lost the world No. 1 spot to Steffi Graf, as her opponent needed to be in a high ranking in order to Seles to earn bonus points (Date was No. 112 while Gabriela Sabatini, defeated at the semifinals, was No. 3)

Date also became the first Japanese female player on reaching the final of any Tier II tournament.

== Seeds ==
The first eight seeds received a bye to the second round.

1. (Socialist Federal Republic of Yugoslavia) Monica Seles (champion)
2. (Argentina) Gabriela Sabatini (semifinals)
3. (Spain) Arantxa Sánchez Vicario (semifinals)
4. (United States) Zina Garrison (second round)
5. (Soviet Union) Leila Meskhi (second round)
6. (Czechoslovakia) Helena Suková (quarterfinals)
7. (United States) Amy Frazier (third round)
8. (United States) Lori McNeil (quarterfinals)
9. (n/a)
10. (Indonesia) Yayuk Basuki (third round)
11. (France) Mary Pierce (third round)
12. (United States) Susan Sloane (first round)
13. (United States) Tami Whitlinger (first round)
14. (Czechoslovakia) Regina Rajchrtová (first round)
15. (Sweden) Catarina Lindqvist (third round)
16. (Australia) Anne Minter (first round)

== Draw ==
=== Key ===
- Q = Qualifier
- WC = Wild card
- LL = Lucky loser
- Alt = Alternate
- SE = Special exempt
- PR = Protected ranking
- ITF = ITF entry
- JE = Junior exempt
- w/o = Walkover
- r = Retired
- d = Defaulted
- SR = Special ranking

=== Finals ===
Quarterfinals
1	(Socialist Federal Republic of Yugoslavia) Monica Seles	6	6
(Argentina) Mercedes Paz	2	2
3	(Spain) Arantxa Sánchez Vicario	4	6	6
6	(Czechoslovakia) Helena Suková	6	4	0
Q	(Japan) Kimiko Date	6	6
(United Kingdom) Jo Durie	4	1
8	(United States) Lori McNeil	3	6	5
2	(Argentina) Gabriela Sabatini	6	4	7

Semifinals
1	(Socialist Federal Republic of Yugoslavia) Monica Seles	6^{5}	6	6
3	(Spain) Arantxa Sánchez Vicario	7^{7}	4	4
Q	(Japan) Kimiko Date	3	6	6
2	(Argentina) Gabriela Sabatini	6	1	4

Final
1	(Socialist Federal Republic of Yugoslavia) Monica Seles	6	6
Q	(Japan) Kimiko Date	3	1

=== Top half ===
==== Section 1 ====
First round
(South Africa) E Reinach	5	6	6
(United Kingdom) C Wood	7	1	3
(United States) P Fendick	0	2
(United States) R White	6	6
(South Africa) A Coetzer	6	7
14	(Czechoslovakia) R Rajchrtová	4	5
16	(Australia) A Minter	3	6	1
(Australia) N Bradtke	6	4	6
(United States) E deLone	1	6	3
(Argentina) M Paz	6	3	6
(Italy) L Ferrando	6	6
Q	(United Kingdom) S Gomer	3	4

Second round
1	(Socialist Federal Republic of Yugoslavia) M Seles	6	6
(South Africa) E Reinach	1	0
(United States) R White	4	4
(South Africa) A Coetzer	6	6
(Australia) N Bradtke	6	6^{2}	3
(Argentina) M Paz	3	7^{7}	6
(Italy) L Ferrando	4	2
7	(United States) A Frazier	6	6

Third round
1	(Socialist Federal Republic of Yugoslavia) M Seles	6	6
(South Africa) A Coetzer	4	1
(Argentina) M Paz	3	7^{8}	6
7	(United States) A Frazier	6	6^{6}	1

Quarterfinals
1	(Socialist Federal Republic of Yugoslavia) M Seles	6	6
(Argentina) M Paz	2	2

==== Section 2 ====
First round
(France) I Demongeot	7^{7}	6
(United States) A May	6^{3}	3
LL	(Australia) JA Faull	3	1
Q	(Australia) Stephanie Martin	6	6
(France) P Paradis-Mangon	1	6	6
(South Africa) R Fairbank-Nideffer	6	3	3
11	(France) M Pierce	6	4	6
(Argentina) P Tarabini	2	6	0
(France) N van Lottum	6	6
(United States) S Stafford	3	4
Q	(France) N Herreman	6	6
Q	(New Zealand) C Toleafoa	3	1

Second round
3	(Spain) A Sánchez Vicario	6	6
(France) I Demongeot	2	3
Q	(Australia) Stephanie Martin	3	6	4
(France) P Paradis-Mangon	6	3	6
11	(France) M Pierce	6	6
(France) N van Lottum	2	2
Q	(France) N Herreman	0	4
6	(Czechoslovakia) H Suková	6	6

Third round
3	(Spain) A Sánchez Vicario	6	6
(France) P Paradis-Mangon	1	3
11	(France) M Pierce	7^{7}	2	2
6	(Czechoslovakia) H Suková	6^{4}	6	6

Quarterfinals
3	(Spain) A Sánchez Vicario	4	6	6
6	(Czechoslovakia) H Suková	6	4	0

=== Bottom half ===
==== Section 3 ====
First round
Q	(Japan) K Date	6	6
(Sweden) C Dahlman	2	2
(Soviet Union) L Savchenko	0	0
(United States) A Grossman	6	6
(West Germany) C Porwik	6	2	4
10	(Indonesia) Y Basuki	2	6	6
13	(United States) T Whitlinger	3	7^{7}	4
(United States) G Magers	6	6^{3}	6
(United States) G Helgeson	7	6
(United Kingdom) M Javer	5	2
(United States) P Harper	6	3	3
(United Kingdom) J Durie	2	6	6

Second round
5	(Soviet Union) L Meskhi	4	1
Q	(Japan) K Date	6	6
(United States) A Grossman	3	4
10	(Indonesia) Y Basuki	6	6
(United States) G Magers	6	7
(United States) G Helgeson	4	5
(United Kingdom) J Durie	6	6^{3}	7
4	(United States) Z Garrison	3	7^{7}	5

Third round
Q	(Japan) K Date	6	6
10	(Indonesia) Y Basuki	2	2
(United States) G Magers	3	4
(United Kingdom) J Durie	6	6

Quarterfinals
Q	(Japan) K Date	6	6
(United Kingdom) J Durie	4	1

==== Section 4 ====
First round
Q	(Japan) M Endo	2	3
Q	(Netherlands) S Rottier	6	6
(France) A Dechaume	6	6
(United States) K Po	1	1
(United States) C Benjamin	5	3
15	(Sweden) C Lindqvist	7	6
12	(United States) S Sloane	1	1^{r}
(United States) D Graham	6	2
(France) C Suire	6	5	1
Q	(Netherlands) P Kamstra	4	7	6
(Canada) P Hy	6	7
LL	(United States) H Ludloff	4	5

Second round
8	(United States) L McNeil	6	6
Q	(Netherlands) S Rottier	1	4
(France) A Dechaume	6	1	2
15	(Sweden) C Lindqvist	2	6	6
(United States) D Graham	6	6
Q	(Netherlands) P Kamstra	1	0
(Canada) P Hy	3	0
2	(Argentina) G Sabatini	6	6

Third round
8	(United States) L McNeil	6^{5}	6	6
15	(Sweden) C Lindqvist	7^{7}	0	1
(United States) D Graham	3	1
2	(Argentina) G Sabatini	6	6

Quarterfinals
8	(United States) L McNeil	3	6	5
2	(Argentina) G Sabatini	6	4	7
