= 1991 Virginia Slims of Los Angeles – Doubles =

Doubles
- 1991 Virginia Slims of Los Angeles

Final
- Champions: (Soviet Union) Larisa Savchenko (Soviet Union) Natasha Zvereva
- Runners-up: (United States) Gretchen Magers (United States) Robin White
- Score: 6–1, 2–6, 6–2

Details
- Draw: 28
- Seeds: 8

Events
Singles	Doubles
← 1990 ·	LA Women's Tennis Championships	· 1992 →

Gigi Fernández and Jana Novotná were the defending champions, but none competed this year.

Larisa Savchenko and Natasha Zvereva won the title by defeating Gretchen Magers and Robin White 6–1, 2–6, 6–2 in the final.

== Seeds ==
The first four seeds received a bye to the second round.

1. (Soviet Union) Larisa Savchenko / (Soviet Union) Natasha Zvereva (champions)
2. (Spain) Arantxa Sánchez Vicario / (Czechoslovakia) Helena Suková (quarterfinals, retired)
3. (United States) Katrina Adams / (United States) Zina Garrison (quarterfinals)
4. (South Africa) Elna Reinach / (United Kingdom) Samantha Smith (semifinals)
5. (United States) Gretchen Magers / (United States) Robin White (final)
6. (United States) Patty Fendick / (United States) Lori McNeil (first round)
7. (United States) Elise Burgin / (Argentina) Mercedes Paz (first round)
8. (South Africa) Rosalyn Fairbank-Nideffer / (South Africa) Lise Gregory (first round)

== Draw ==
=== Key ===
- Q = Qualifier
- WC = Wild card
- LL = Lucky loser
- Alt = Alternate
- SE = Special exempt
- PR = Protected ranking
- ITF = ITF entry
- JE = Junior exempt
- w/o = Walkover
- r = Retired
- d = Defaulted
- SR = Special ranking

=== Finals ===
Semifinals
1	(Soviet Union) Larisa Savchenko (Soviet Union) Natasha Zvereva	6	4	6
4	(South Africa) Elna Reinach (United Kingdom) Samantha Smith	2	6	2
(Indonesia) Yayuk Basuki (United Kingdom) Jo Durie	4	6^{5}
5	(United States) Gretchen Magers (United States) Robin White	6	7^{7}

Final
1	(Soviet Union) Larisa Savchenko (Soviet Union) Natasha Zvereva	6	2	6
5	(United States) Gretchen Magers (United States) Robin White	1	6	2

=== Top half ===
First round
(West Germany) E Pfaff (West Germany) C Porwik	7^{9}	6
(United States) PL Harper (United States) A May	6^{7}	2
(United States) S Stafford (United States) T Whitlinger	5	2
(Sweden) M Lindström (France) C Suire	7	6
(Italy) L Ferrando (Argentina) P Tarabini	7	6
6	(United States) P Fendick (United States) L McNeil	5	1
(United States) C Benjamin (United Kingdom) C Wood	1	3
(United States) A Frazier (United States) L Spadea	6	6
(New Zealand) B Cordwell (Sweden) C Lindqvist	7	6
(Mexico) L Novelo (United States) S Sampras	5	2
(Soviet Union) L Meskhi (Czechoslovakia) R Rajchrtová	6	7^{7}
7	(United States) E Burgin (Argentina) M Paz	2	6^{5}

Second round
1	(Soviet Union) L Savchenko (Soviet Union) N Zvereva	6	3	6
(West Germany) E Pfaff (West Germany) C Porwik	2	6	3
(Sweden) M Lindström (France) C Suire	2	7^{7}	6^{7}
(Italy) L Ferrando (Argentina) P Tarabini	6	6^{3}	7^{9}
4	(South Africa) E Reinach (United Kingdom) S Smith	6	6
(United States) A Frazier (United States) L Spadea	0	4
(New Zealand) B Cordwell (Sweden) C Lindqvist	4	1
(Soviet Union) L Meskhi (Czechoslovakia) R Rajchrtová	6	6

Quarterfinals
1	(Soviet Union) L Savchenko (Soviet Union) N Zvereva	6	6
(Italy) L Ferrando (Argentina) P Tarabini	2	4
4	(South Africa) E Reinach (United Kingdom) S Smith	6	6
(Soviet Union) L Meskhi (Czechoslovakia) R Rajchrtová	1	1

Semifinals
1	(Soviet Union) L Savchenko (Soviet Union) N Zvereva	6	4	6
4	(South Africa) E Reinach (United Kingdom) S Smith	2	6	2

=== Bottom half ===
First round
8	(South Africa) R Fairbank-Nideffer (South Africa) L Gregory	6^{3}	6	2
(France) A Dechaume (France) M Pierce	7^{7}	2	6
(Indonesia) Y Basuki (United Kingdom) J Durie	6	6
(United States) A Grossman (South Africa) Lisa Seemann	1	3
(United States) K May-Paben (United States) A White	7	1	6
(United States) L Allen (France) S Amiach	5	6	2
5	(United States) G Magers (United States) R White	7	3	6
(Australia) JA Faull (Australia) R Stubbs	5	6	3
(France) N Herreman (France) P Paradis-Mangon	2	6	2
Q	(Japan) K Date (Japan) R Hiraki	6	4	6
(United States) A Henricksson (United States) J Smoller	7	5	1
(United States) H Ludloff (United States) C Macgregor	5	7	6

Second round
(France) A Dechaume (France) M Pierce	6	4	1
(Indonesia) Y Basuki (United Kingdom) J Durie	2	6	6
(United States) K May-Paben (United States) A White	3	2
3	(United States) K Adams (United States) Z Garrison	6	6
5	(United States) G Magers (United States) R White	6	5	6
Q	(Japan) K Date (Japan) R Hiraki	3	7	2
(United States) H Ludloff (United States) C Macgregor	3	4
2	(Spain) A Sánchez Vicario (Czechoslovakia) H Suková	6	6

Quarterfinals
(Indonesia) Y Basuki (United Kingdom) J Durie	6	6
3	(United States) K Adams (United States) Z Garrison	4	3
5	(United States) G Magers (United States) R White	6	1
2	(Spain) A Sánchez Vicario (Czechoslovakia) H Suková	1	0^{r}

Semifinals
(Indonesia) Y Basuki (United Kingdom) J Durie	4	6^{5}
5	(United States) G Magers (United States) R White	6	7^{7}
