= 1989 Virginia Slims of Los Angeles – Doubles =

Doubles
- 1989 Virginia Slims of Los Angeles
- 1988 Champions: (United States) Patty Fendick (Canada) Jill Hetherington

Final
- Champions: (United States) Martina Navratilova (Australia) Wendy Turnbull
- Runners-up: (United States) Mary Joe Fernández (West Germany) Claudia Kohde-Kilsch
- Score: 5–2 (Fernández and Kohde-Kilsch retired)

Details
- Draw: 28
- Seeds: 8

Events
| Singles | Doubles |
| ← 1988 · | Virginia Slims of Los Angeles | · 1990 → |

Patty Fendick and Jill Hetherington were the defending champions of the doubles event at the 1989 Virginia Slims of Los Angeles tennis tournament but lost in the quarterfinals to Elizabeth Smylie and Janine Tremelling.

Martina Navratilova and Wendy Turnbull won the final 5–2 after Mary Joe Fernández and Claudia Kohde-Kilsch were forced to retire.

== Seeds ==
Champion seeds are indicated in bold text while text in italics indicates the round in which those seeds were eliminated. The top four seeded teams received byes into the second round.

1. (United States) **Martina Navratilova** / (Australia) **Wendy Turnbull (champions)**
2. (United States) Patty Fendick / (Canada) Jill Hetherington (quarterfinals)
3. (United States) Katrina Adams / (United States) Zina Garrison (quarterfinals)
4. (United States) Elise Burgin / (United States) Pam Shriver (second round)
5. (United States) Gigi Fernández / (United States) Robin White (quarterfinals)
6. (Australia) Hana Mandlíková / (Hungary) Andrea Temesvári (quarterfinals)
7. (Australia) Elizabeth Smylie / (Australia) Janine Tremelling (semifinals)
8. (France) Isabelle Demongeot / (France) Nathalie Tauziat (semifinals)

== Draw ==
=== Key ===
- Q = Qualifier
- WC = Wild card
- LL = Lucky loser
- Alt = Alternate
- SE = Special exempt
- PR = Protected ranking
- ITF = ITF entry
- JE = Junior exempt
- w/o = Walkover
- r = Retired
- d = Defaulted
- SR = Special ranking

=== Final ===
Final

1
- (United States) **Martina Navratilova**
- (Australia) **Wendy Turnbull**
5

- (United States) Mary Joe Fernández
- (West Germany) Claudia Kohde-Kilsch
2^{r}

=== Top half ===
First round

Second round

Quarterfinals

Semifinals

1
- (United States) **M Navratilova**
- (Australia) **W Turnbull**
**6**
**6**

- (United States) L McNeil
- (United States) J Smoller
2
3

- (South Africa) L Gregory
- (United States) G Magers
3
2

- (South Africa) **L Gregory**
- (United States) **G Magers**
**6**
**6**

1
- (United States) **M Navratilova**
- (Australia) **W Turnbull**
**6**
**6**

- (United States) M Louie-Harper
- (Australia) A Scott
2
1

5
- (United States) G Fernández
- (United States) R White
3
3

- (Australia) **J Byrne**
- (West Germany) **E Pfaff**
**6**
**6**

- (Australia) J Byrne
- (West Germany) E Pfaff
1
3

- (United States) L Bartlett
- (United States) J Thomas
3
3

5
- (United States) **G Fernández**
- (United States) **R White**
**6**
**6**

5
- (United States) **G Fernández**
- (United States) **R White**
**6**
**6**

1
- (United States) **M Navratilova**
- (Australia) **W Turnbull**
**6**
**6**

8
- (France) I Demongeot
- (France) N Tauziat
2
4

3
- (United States) **K Adams**
- (United States) **Z Garrison**
**6**
**6**

- (United States) **A May**
- (United States) **K Po**
**6**
4
**6**

- (United States) A May
- (United States) K Po
3
1

- (United States) C Benjamin
- (France) P Paradis
4
**6**
4

3
- (United States) K Adams
- (United States) Z Garrison
5
6

- (United States) L Antonoplis
- (United States) S Collins
3
4

8
- (France) **I Demongeot**
- (France) **N Tauziat**
**7**
**7**

- (United States) **M L Daniels**
- (United States) **W White**
**6**
**6**

- (United States) M L Daniels
- (United States) W White
3
**7**
3

- (Sweden) M Lindström
- (United States) H Ludloff
3
4

8
- (France) **I Demongeot**
- (France) **N Tauziat**
**6**
6
**6**

8
- (France) **I Demongeot**
- (France) **N Tauziat**
**6**
**6**

=== Bottom half ===
First round

Second round

Quarterfinals

Semifinals

6
- (Australia) **H Mandlíková**
- (Hungary) **A Temesvári**
**6**
3
**6**

- (United States) R Casals
- (Czechoslovakia) J Pospíšilová
2
**6**
1

6
- (Australia) **H Mandlíková**
- (Hungary) **A Temesvári**
**7**
4
**6**

- (West Germany) **C Porwik**
- (Italy) **R Reggi**
**6**
**6**

- (West Germany) C Porwik
- (Italy) R Reggi
5
**6**
3

- (United States) H Cioffi
- (United States) A Frazier
0
2

6
- (Australia) H Mandlíková
- (Hungary) A Temesvári
2
2

- (United States) **M J Fernández**
- (West Germany) **C Kohde-Kilsch**
**6**
**6**

- (United States) **M J Fernández**
- (West Germany) **C Kohde-Kilsch**
**6**
**6**

- (United States) A Henricksson
- (United States) B Herr
2
1

- (United States) **M J Fernández**
- (West Germany) **C Kohde-Kilsch**
**7**
**6**

4
- (United States) E Burgin
- (United States) P Shriver
6
4

- (United States) **M J Fernández**
- (West Germany) **C Kohde-Kilsch**
**6**
5
**6**

7
- (Australia) **E Smylie**
- (Australia) **J Tremelling**
**6**
**7**

7
- (Australia) E Smylie
- (Australia) J Tremelling
4
**7**
3

- (United States) L Bonder-Kreiss
- (United States) A White
2
5

7
- (Australia) **E Smylie**
- (Australia) **J Tremelling**
**6**
**6**

- (South Africa) **L Barnard**
- (Switzerland) **E Krapl**
3
**6**
**7**

- (South Africa) L Barnard
- (Switzerland) E Krapl
2
1

- (Canada) H Kelesi
- (United States) T Phelps
**6**
4
5

7
- (Australia) **E Smylie**
- (Australia) **J Tremelling**
**6**
4
**6**

- (Japan) E Iida
- (Japan) M Kidowaki
**6**
4
5

2
- (United States) P Fendick
- (Canada) J Hetherington
4
**6**
4

- (Poland) **R Baranski**
- (United States) **M Norwood**
3
**6**
**7**

- (Poland) R Baranski
- (United States) M Norwood
1
3

2
- (United States) **P Fendick**
- (Canada) **J Hetherington**
**6**
**6**
