= 1989 Virginia Slims of Los Angeles – Singles =

Singles
- 1989 Virginia Slims of Los Angeles
- 1988 Champion: (United States) Chris Evert

Final
- Champion: (United States) Martina Navratilova
- Runner-up: (Argentina) Gabriela Sabatini
- Score: 6–0, 6–2

Details
- Draw: 56
- Seeds: 16

Events
Singles	Doubles
← 1988 ·	Virginia Slims of Los Angeles	· 1990 →

Chris Evert was the defending champion of the singles event at the Virginia Slims of Los Angeles tennis tournament but did not compete that year.

Martina Navratilova won in the final 6–0, 6–2 against Gabriela Sabatini.

== Seeds ==
A champion seed is indicated in bold text while text in italics indicates the round in which that seed was eliminated. The top eight seeds received a bye to the second round.

1. (United States) **Martina Navratilova (champion)**
2. (Argentina) Gabriela Sabatini (final)
3. (United States) Zina Garrison (semifinals)
4. (United States) Pam Shriver (semifinals)
5. (United States) Mary Joe Fernández (quarterfinals)
6. (Canada) Helen Kelesi (third round)
7. (Australia) Hana Mandlíková (quarterfinals)
8. (Sweden) Catarina Lindqvist (quarterfinals)
9. (Italy) Raffaella Reggi (first round)
10. (United States) Patty Fendick (second round)
11. (United States) Lori McNeil (first round)
12. (France) Nathalie Tauziat (quarterfinals)
13. (West Germany) Claudia Kohde-Kilsch (second round)
14. (United States) Terry Phelps (third round)
15. (United States) Gretchen Magers (third round)
16. (United States) Amy Frazier (third round)

== Draw ==
=== Key ===
- Q = Qualifier
- WC = Wild card
- LL = Lucky loser
- Alt = Alternate
- SE = Special exempt
- PR = Protected ranking
- ITF = ITF entry
- JE = Junior exempt
- w/o = Walkover
- r = Retired
- d = Defaulted
- SR = Special ranking

=== Finals ===
Semifinals
1	(United States) **Martina Navratilova**	**6**	**6**
3	(United States) Zina Garrison	1	4
4	(United States) Pam Shriver	4	2
2	(Argentina) **Gabriela Sabatini**	**6**	**6**

Final
1	(United States) **Martina Navratilova**	**6**	**6**
2	(Argentina) Gabriela Sabatini	0	2

=== Top half ===
==== Section 1 ====
First round
(Canada) R Simpson	5	5
(France) **I Demongeot**	**7**	**7**
(United States) **R White**	**6**	3	**6**
(Japan) E Inoue	4	**6**	1
(United States) A May	**6**	0	2
14	(United States) **T Phelps**	2	**6**	**6**
16	(United States) **A Frazier**	**6**	**6**
(United States) C Benjamin	2	2
Q	(Poland) R Baranski	2	**6**	3
(United States) **W White**	**6**	2	**6**
(United States) H Cioffi	0	**6**	6
(France) **P Paradis**	**6**	4	**7**

Second round
1	(United States) **M Navratilova**	**6**	**6**
(France) I Demongeot	3	2
(United States) R White	6	5
14	(United States) **T Phelps**	**7**	**7**
16	(United States) **A Frazier**	**6**	3	**6**
(United States) W White	4	**6**	2
(France) P Paradis	0	1
7	(Australia) **H Mandlíková**	**6**	**6**

Third round
1	(United States) **M Navratilova**	**6**	**6**
14	(United States) T Phelps	3	1
16	(United States) A Frazier	1	**6**	2
7	(Australia) **H Mandlíková**	**6**	0	**6**

Quarterfinals
1	(United States) **M Navratilova**	**7**	**6**
7	(Australia) H Mandlíková	5	4

==== Section 2 ====
First round
(South Africa) **A Coetzer**	**6**	**6**
(United Kingdom) S Gomer	1	0
(United States) **G Fernández**	**6**	6	**6**
(United States) M Werdel	1	**7**	1
Q	(United Kingdom) **M Javer**	**6**	**6**
9	(Italy) R Reggi	1	3
12	(France) **N Tauziat**	**6**	**6**
(United States) E Burgin	2	2
(United States) **K Adams**	**7**	**7**
LL	(United States) L-A Eldredge	5	5
LL	(United States) L Harvey-Wild	4	4
(United States) **A Henricksson**	**6**	**6**

Second round
3	(United States) **Z Garrison**	**6**	**6**
(South Africa) A Coetzer	3	2
(United States) G Fernández	6	3
Q	(United Kingdom) **M Javer**	**7**	**6**
12	(France) **N Tauziat**	**6**	**7**
(United States) K Adams	3	6
(United States) A Henricksson	3	1
6	(Canada) **H Kelesi**	**6**	**6**

Third round
3	(United States) **Z Garrison**	**6**	**6**
Q	(United Kingdom) M Javer	1	2
12	(France) **N Tauziat**	**6**	2	**6**
6	(Canada) H Kelesi	2	**6**	2

Quarterfinals
3	(United States) **Z Garrison**	**6**	**6**
12	(France) N Tauziat	4	2

=== Bottom half ===
==== Section 3 ====
First round
(Australia) **E Smylie**	**6**	**7**
(Switzerland) E Krapl	3	5
(United States) **L Allen**	**7**	**6**
(United Kingdom) J Durie	5	3
(Czechoslovakia) J Pospíšilová	4	**6**	3
15	(United States) **G Magers**	**6**	3	**6**
10	(United States) **P Fendick**	**6**	**6**
Q	(United States) K Shin	4	3
(West Germany) **C Porwik**	**7**	**6**
(West Germany) E Pfaff	5	3
(United States) **S Martin**	**6**	**6**
(Australia) J Tremelling	4	1

Second round
5	(United States) **M J Fernández**	**6**	**6**
(Australia) E Smylie	3	3
(United States) L Allen	2	**6**	6
15	(United States) **G Magers**	**6**	3	**7**
10	(United States) P Fendick	3	0
(West Germany) **C Porwik**	**6**	**6**
(United States) S Martin	2	4
4	(United States) **P Shriver**	**6**	**6**

Third round
5	(United States) **M J Fernández**	**6**	**6**
15	(United States) G Magers	2	3
(West Germany) C Porwik	**6**	3	0
4	(United States) **P Shriver**	4	**6**	**6**

Quarterfinals
5	(United States) M J Fernández	3	4
4	(United States) **P Shriver**	**6**	**6**

==== Section 4 ====
First round
(United States) **S Birch**	**6**	**7**
Q	(United States) J Santrock	4	6
Q	(United States) D Graham	6	2
LL	(Sweden) **M Lindström**	**7**	**6**
(United States) **T Whitlinger**	**7**	**6**
11	(United States) L McNeil	6	1
13	(West Germany) **C Kohde-Kilsch**	4	**6**	**7**
Q	(United States) A Ivan	**6**	3	5
Q	(Canada) J Hetherington	**6**	2	4
(United States) **M L Daniels**	2	**6**	**6**
Q	(Japan) M Kidowaki	2	1
(Australia) **J Byrne**	**6**	**6**

Second round
8	(Sweden) **C Lindqvist**	**6**	5	**6**
(United States) S Birch	2	**7**	2
LL	(Sweden) M Lindström	4	3
(United States) **T Whitlinger**	**6**	**6**
13	(West Germany) C Kohde-Kilsch	6	6
(United States) **M L Daniels**	**7**	**7**
(Australia) J Byrne	0	2
2	(Argentina) **G Sabatini**	**6**	**6**

Third round
8	(Sweden) **C Lindqvist**	**7**	4	**6**
(United States) T Whitlinger	6	**6**	4
(United States) M L Daniels	0	2
2	(Argentina) **G Sabatini**	**6**	**6**

Quarterfinals
8	(Sweden) C Lindqvist	2	4
2	(Argentina) **G Sabatini**	**6**	**6**
