= 1988 Virginia Slims of Los Angeles – Singles =

Singles
- 1988 Virginia Slims of Los Angeles
- 1987 Champion: (West Germany) Steffi Graf

Final
- Champion: (United States) Chris Evert
- Runner-up: (Argentina) Gabriela Sabatini
- Score: 2–6, 6–1, 6–1

Details
- Draw: 56
- Seeds: 18

Events
Singles	Doubles
← 1987 ·	Virginia Slims of Los Angeles	· 1989 →

Steffi Graf was the defending champion but did not compete that year.

Chris Evert won in the final 2–6, 6–1, 6–1 against Gabriela Sabatini.

== Seeds ==
A champion seed is indicated in bold text while text in italics indicates the round in which that seed was eliminated. The top eight seeds received a bye to the second round.

1. (United States) **Chris Evert (champion)**
2. (United States) Pam Shriver (second round)
3. (Argentina) Gabriela Sabatini (final)
4. (United States) Lori McNeil (quarterfinals)
5. (United States) Zina Garrison (semifinals)
6. (United States) Patty Fendick (quarterfinals)
7. (Australia) Anne Minter (quarterfinals)
8. (United States) Stephanie Rehe (semifinals)
9. (Sweden) Catarina Lindqvist (third round)
10. (Australia) Dianne Balestrat (third round)
11. (United States) Robin White (third round)
12. (United States) Gretchen Magers (third round)
13. (United States) Halle Cioffi (third round)
14. (United Kingdom) Sara Gomer (third round)
15. n/a
16. n/a

== Draw ==
=== Key ===
- Q = Qualifier
- WC = Wild card
- LL = Lucky loser
- Alt = Alternate
- SE = Special exempt
- PR = Protected ranking
- ITF = ITF entry
- JE = Junior exempt
- w/o = Walkover
- r = Retired
- d = Defaulted
- SR = Special ranking

=== Finals ===
Semifinals
1	(United States) **Chris Evert**	**6**	**6**
8	(United States) Stephanie Rehe	3	3
3	(Argentina) **Gabriela Sabatini**	**6**	5	**7**
5	(United States) Zina Garrison	3	**7**	5

Final
1	(United States) **Chris Evert**	2	**6**	**6**
3	(Argentina) Gabriela Sabatini	**6**	1	1

=== Top half ===
==== Section 1 ====
First round
(United States) G Fernández	3	6
(West Germany) **E Pfaff**	**6**	**7**
(United States) M Werdel	4	5
(United States) **K Keil**	**6**	**7**
(Australia) M Jaggard	2	3
13	(United States) **H Cioffi**	**6**	**6**
11	(United States) **R White**	**6**	4	**7**
(South Africa) D Van Rensburg	4	**6**	6
Q	(United States) **R Reis**	**6**	**6**
Q	(United States) K Steinmetz	2	1
(United States) E Burgin	4	2
(United States) **S Sloane**	**6**	**6**

Second round
1	(United States) **C Evert**	**6**	**6**
(West Germany) E Pfaff	2	2
(United States) K Keil	5	2
13	(United States) **H Cioffi**	**7**	**6**
11	(United States) **R White**	**7**	**7**
Q	(United States) R Reis	6	5
(United States) S Sloane	1	3
6	(United States) **P Fendick**	**6**	**6**

Third round
1	(West Germany) **C Evert**	**6**	**6**
13	(United States) H Cioffi	2	0
11	(United States) R White	4	4
6	(United States) **P Fendick**	**6**	**6**

Quarterfinals
1	(United States) **C Evert**	**6**	**6**
6	(United States) P Fendick	4	0

==== Section 2 ====
First round
(West Germany) C Singer	4	4
(United States) **H Ludloff**	**6**	**6**
Q	(United States) **S Collins**	**6**	**6**
(United States) C Christian	3	3
(United States) E Hakami	3	1	r
9	(Sweden) **C Lindqvist**	**6**	**4**
(United States) **H Na**	4	**6**	**6**
Q	(United States) L-A Eldredge	**6**	4	3
Q	(South Africa) **A Coetzer**	**6**	**6**
(United States) K Adams	3	3
(United States) S Martin	3	1
(United States) **A Henricksson**	**6**	**6**

Second round
4	(United States) **L McNeil**	4	**6**	**6**
(United States) H Ludloff	**6**	1	3
Q	(United States) S Collins	0	6
9	(Sweden) **C Lindqvist**	**6**	**7**
(United States) **H Na**	**6**	**6**
Q	(South Africa) A Coetzer	4	2
(United States) A Henricksson	3	3
8	(United States) **S Rehe**	**6**	**6**

Third round
4	(United States) **L McNeil**	**6**	6	**6**
9	(Sweden) C Lindqvist	4	**7**	4
(United States) H Na	2	2
8	(United States) **S Rehe**	**6**	**6**

Quarterfinals
4	(United States) L McNeil	4	**6**	4
8	(United States) **S Rehe**	**6**	3	**6**

=== Bottom half ===
==== Section 3 ====
First round
Q	(United States) **P Barg**	**6**	**6**
(United States) C Benjamin	0	3
(United States) **A Smith**	**6**	**6**
Q	(United States) T Mochizuki	1	4
(Australia) W Turnbull	3	2
10	(Australia) **D Balestrat**	**6**	**6**
14	(United Kingdom) **S Gomer**	**6**	**6**
Q	(United States) A Ivan	4	4
(United States) K Horvath	3	3
(United Kingdom) **J Durie**	**6**	**6**
(United States) **W White**	**6**	**7**
(Switzerland) E Krapl	4	5

Second round
7	(Australia) **A Minter**	**6**	**6**
Q	(United States) P Barg	2	0
(United States) A Smith	2	6
10	(Australia) **D Balestrat**	**6**	**7**
14	(United Kingdom) **S Gomer**	1	**6**	**6**
(United Kingdom) J Durie	**6**	3	3
(United States) W White	1	5
3	(Argentina) **G Sabatini**	**6**	**7**

Third round
7	(Australia) **A Minter**	**6**	**6**
10	(Australia) D Balestrat	1	0
14	(United Kingdom) S Gomer	2	4
3	(Argentina) **G Sabatini**	**6**	**6**

Quarterfinals
7	(Australia) A Minter	2	4
3	(Argentina) **G Sabatini**	**6**	**6**

==== Section 4 ====
First round
(United Kingdom) **M Javer**	**7**	**6**
(Japan) M Yanagi	6	1
(South Africa) **K Schimper**	**7**	**6**
(United States) P Louie-Harper	6	1
(Peru) **P Vásquez**	**7**	**6**
(Canada) J Hetherington	5	2
12	(United States) **G Magers**	2	**6**	**6**
(United States) L Bonder-Kreiss	**6**	3	3
(Sweden) M Lindström	4	**6**	3
(United States) **B Nagelsen**	**6**	4	**6**
(United States) S Mascarin	2	0
(United States) **A Frazier**	**6**	**6**

Second round
5	(United States) **Z Garrison**	**6**	**6**
(United Kingdom) M Javer	3	1
(South Africa) **K Schimper**	4	**6**	**6**
(Peru) P Vásquez	**6**	4	3
12	(United States) **G Magers**	**6**	3	**6**
(United States) B Nagelsen	3	**6**	2
(United States) **A Frazier**	**6**	3	**7**
2	(United States) P Shriver	4	**6**	5

Third round
5	(United States) **Z Garrison**	**6**	**6**
(South Africa) K Schimper	2	3
12	(United States) G Magers	4	5
(United States) **A Frazier**	**6**	**7**

Quarterfinals
5	(United States) **Z Garrison**	**6**	**6**
(United States) A Frazier	1	2
