= 1988 Virginia Slims of Los Angeles – Doubles =

Doubles
- 1988 Virginia Slims of Los Angeles
- 1987 Champions: (United States) Martina Navratilova (United States) Pam Shriver

Final
- Champions: (United States) Patty Fendick (Canada) Jill Hetherington
- Runners-up: (United States) Gigi Fernández (United States) Robin White
- Score: 7–6, 5–7, 6–4

Details
- Draw: 28
- Seeds: 8

Events
Singles	Doubles
← 1987 ·	Virginia Slims of Los Angeles	· 1989 →

Martina Navratilova and Pam Shriver were the defending champions but did not compete that year.

Patty Fendick and Jill Hetherington won in the final 7–6, 5–7, 6–4 against Gigi Fernández and Robin White.

== Seeds ==
Champion seeds are indicated in bold text while text in italics indicates the round in which those seeds were eliminated. The top four seeded teams received byes into the second round.

1. (United States) Lori McNeil / (United States) Betsy Nagelsen (quarterfinals)
2. (West Germany) Eva Pfaff / (Australia) Elizabeth Smylie (second round)
3. (United States) Katrina Adams / (United States) Zina Garrison (second round)
4. (United States) Gigi Fernández / (United States) Robin White (final)
5. (United States) Chris Evert / (Australia) Wendy Turnbull (semifinals)
6. (United States) Penny Barg / (United States) Elise Burgin (semifinals)
7. (South Africa) Lise Gregory / (United States) Ronni Reis (quarterfinals)
8. (United Kingdom) Jo Durie / (United States) Sharon Walsh-Pete (quarterfinals)

== Draw ==
=== Key ===
- Q = Qualifier
- WC = Wild card
- LL = Lucky loser
- Alt = Alternate
- SE = Special exempt
- PR = Protected ranking
- ITF = ITF entry
- JE = Junior exempt
- w/o = Walkover
- r = Retired
- d = Defaulted
- SR = Special ranking

=== Final ===
Final

4
- (United States) Gigi Fernández
- (United States) Robin White
6
**7**
4

- (United States) **Patty Fendick**
- (Canada) **Jill Hetherington**
**7**
5
**6**

=== Top half ===
First round

Second round

Quarterfinals

Semifinals

1
- (United States) **L McNeil**
- (United States) **B Nagelsen**
**6**
**6**

- (United States) **K Steinmetz**
- (United States) **W Wood**
**6**
**7**

- (United States) K Steinmetz
- (United States) W Wood
1
1

- (United States) C Christian
- (United States) A Frazier
4
5

1
- (United States) L McNeil
- (United States) B Nagelsen
0
2

- (United States) **P Louie-Harper**
- (United States) **H Ludloff**
**6**
**6**

6
- (United States) **P Barg**
- (United States) **E Burgin**
**6**
**6**

- (United States) L Allen
- (Australia) A Minter
4
2

- (United States) P Louie-Harper
- (United States) H Ludloff
**6**
5
1

- (Switzerland) E Krapl
- (Japan) M Yanagi
1
1

6
- (United States) **P Barg**
- (United States) **E Burgin**
4
**7**
**6**

6
- (United States) **P Barg**
- (United States) **E Burgin**
**6**
**6**

6
- (United States) P Barg
- (United States) E Burgin
**6**
3
3

4
- (United States) **G Fernández**
- (United States) **R White**
1
**6**
**6**

4
- (United States) **G Fernández**
- (United States) **R White**
**6**
2
**7**

- (South Africa) **L Barnard**
- (South Africa) **K Schimper**
**6**
4
**6**

- (South Africa) L Barnard
- (South Africa) K Schimper
4
**6**
6

- (United States) C Benjamin
- (United States) H Na
3
**6**
4

4
- (United States) **G Fernández**
- (United States) **R White**
**6**
**6**

- (United States) A-M Fernandez
- (United States) P Smith
2
2

8
- (United Kingdom) J Durie
- (United States) S Walsh-Pete
2
1

- (United States) **K Horvath**
- (South Africa) **D Van Rensburg**
**6**
**6**

- (United States) K Horvath
- (South Africa) D Van Rensburg
0
**7**
0

- (United States) C MacGregor
- (West Germany) C Singer
2
4

8
- (United Kingdom) **J Durie**
- (United States) **S Walsh-Pete**
**6**
6
**6**

8
- (United Kingdom) **J Durie**
- (United States) **S Walsh-Pete**
**6**
**6**

=== Bottom half ===
First round

Second round

Quarterfinals

Semifinals

5
- (United States) **C Evert**
- (Australia) **W Turnbull**
**6**
**6**

- (United States) L Antonoplis
- (Sweden) M Lindström
2
2

5
- (United States) **C Evert**
- (Australia) **W Turnbull**
**6**
**6**

- (United States) K Keil
- (United States) S Mascarin
0
0

- (United States) A Henricksson
- (United States) A Smith
4
4

- (United States) **A Henricksson**
- (United States) **A Smith**
**6**
**6**

5
- (United States) **C Evert**
- (Australia) **W Turnbull**
**7**
**6**

- (United States) **G Magers**
- (United States) **W White**
**6**
**7**

- (United States) G Magers
- (United States) W White
6
2

- (South Africa) A Coetzer
- (United States) S Savides
1
6

- (United States) **G Magers**
- (United States) **W White**
**6**
**6**

3
- (United States) K Adams
- (United States) Z Garrison
4
3

5
- (United States) C Evert
- (Australia) W Turnbull
**6**
4
1

7
- (South Africa) **L Gregory**
- (United States) **R Reis**
**6**
**6**

- (United States) **P Fendick**
- (Canada) **J Hetherington**
0
**6**
**6**

- (Mexico) L Novelo
- (United States) S Sampras
2
4

7
- (South Africa) **L Gregory**
- (United States) **R Reis**
**6**
**6**

- (United States) **J Kaplan**
- (Brazil) **T Zambrzycki**
**7**
**6**

- (United States) J Kaplan
- (Brazil) T Zambrzycki
0
2

- (United States) T Austin
- (Sweden) C Lindqvist
5
4

7
- (South Africa) L Gregory
- (United States) R Reis
5
**6**
6

- (United States) **P Fendick**
- (Canada) **J Hetherington**
**7**
**7**

- (United States) **P Fendick**
- (Canada) **J Hetherington**
**7**
2
**7**

- (United States) S Collins
- (Australia) M Jaggard
5
6

- (United States) **P Fendick**
- (Canada) **J Hetherington**
**6**
**7**

2
- (West Germany) E Pfaff
- (Australia) E Smylie
3
6
