= 1991 Virginia Slims of Los Angeles =

- Date: August 12–18
- Edition: 18th
- Category: Tier II
- Draw: 56S / 28D
- Prize money: $350,000
- Surface: Hard / outdoor
- Location: Manhattan Beach, CA, U.S.
- Venue: Manhattan Country Club

Champions

Singles
- (Socialist Federal Republic of Yugoslavia) Monica Seles

Doubles
- (Soviet Union) Larisa Neiland / (Soviet Union) Natasha Zvereva
← 1990 ·	Virginia Slims of Los Angeles	· 1992 →

The 1991 Virginia Slims of Los Angeles was a women's tennis tournament played on outdoor hard courts at the Manhattan Country Club in Manhattan Beach, California in the United States that was part of the Tier II category of the 1991 WTA Tour. It was the 18th edition of the tournament and was held from August 12 through August 18, 1991. First-seeded Monica Seles won her second consecutive singles title at the event and earned $70,000 first-prize money.

== Finals ==
=== Singles ===
(Socialist Federal Republic of Yugoslavia) Monica Seles defeated (Japan) Kimiko Date 6–3, 6–1

- It was Seles' 5th singles title of the year and the 15th of her career.

=== Doubles ===
(Soviet Union) Larisa Neiland / (Soviet Union) Natasha Zvereva defeated (United States) Gretchen Magers / (United States) Robin White 6–1, 2–6, 6–2
