= 1996 Acura Classic =

- Date: August 12–18
- Edition: 23rd
- Category: Tier II
- Draw: 56S / 28D
- Prize money: $450,000
- Surface: Hard / outdoor
- Location: Manhattan Beach, California, U.S.
- Venue: Manhattan Country Club

Champions

Singles
- (United States) Lindsay Davenport

Doubles
- (United States) Lindsay Davenport (Belarus) Natasha Zvereva
| ← 1995 · | WTA Los Angeles | · 1997 → |

The 1996 Acura Classic was a women's tennis tournament played on outdoor hard courts at the Manhattan Country Club in Manhattan Beach, California in the United States that was part of Tier II of the 1996 WTA Tour. It was the 23rd edition of the tournament and was held from August 12 through August 18, 1996. Fourth-seeded Lindsay Davenport won the singles title.

== Finals ==
=== Singles ===
(United States) Lindsay Davenport defeated (Germany) Anke Huber 6–2, 6–3

- It was Davenport's 5th title of the year and the 15th of her career.

=== Doubles ===
(United States) Lindsay Davenport / (Belarus) Natasha Zvereva defeated (United States) Amy Frazier / (United States) Kimberly Po 6–1, 6–4

- It was Davenport's 6th title of the year and the 16th of her career. It was Zvereva's 2nd title of the year and the 62nd of her career.
