= 1995 Acura Classic – Doubles =

Doubles
- 1995 Acura Classic
- 1994 Champions: (France) Julie Halard (France) Nathalie Tauziat

Final
- Champions: (United States) Gigi Fernández (Belarus) Natasha Zvereva
- Runners-up: (Latvia) Larisa Neiland (Argentina) Gabriela Sabatini
- Score: 7–5, 6–7, 7–5

Details
- Draw: 28
- Seeds: 8

Events
Singles	Doubles
← 1994 ·	WTA Los Angeles	· 1996 →

Julie Halard and Nathalie Tauziat were the defending champions but lost in the semifinals to Larisa Neiland and Gabriela Sabatini.

Gigi Fernández and Natasha Zvereva won in the final 7–5, 6–7, 7–5 against Neiland and Sabatini.

== Seeds ==
Champion seeds are indicated in bold text while text in italics indicates the round in which those seeds were eliminated. The top four seeded teams received byes into the second round.

1. (United States) **Gigi Fernández** / (Belarus) **Natasha Zvereva (champions)**
2. (Latvia) Larisa Neiland / (Argentina) Gabriela Sabatini (final)
3. (United States) Patty Fendick / (United States) Mary Joe Fernández (quarterfinals)
4. (Spain) Conchita Martínez / (Argentina) Patricia Tarabini (quarterfinals)
5. (United States) Lori McNeil / (United States) Lisa Raymond (quarterfinals)
6. (France) Julie Halard / (France) Nathalie Tauziat (semifinals)
7. (Russia) Elena Makarova / (Russia) Eugenia Maniokova (first round)
8. (Indonesia) Yayuk Basuki / (Netherlands) Caroline Vis (quarterfinals)

== Draw ==
=== Key ===
- Q = Qualifier
- WC = Wild card
- LL = Lucky loser
- Alt = Alternate
- SE = Special exempt
- PR = Protected ranking
- ITF = ITF entry
- JE = Junior exempt
- w/o = Walkover
- r = Retired
- d = Defaulted
- SR = Special ranking

=== Final ===
Final

1
- (United States) **Gigi Fernández**
- (Belarus) **Natasha Zvereva**
**7**
6
**7**

2
- (Argentina) Gabriela Sabatini
- (Latvia) Larisa Savchenko
5
**7**
5

=== Top half ===
First round

Second round

Quarterfinals

Semifinals

1
- (United States) **G Fernández**
- (Belarus) **N Zvereva**
**6**
**7**

- (Germany) **A Huber**
- (Germany) **C Singer**
**6**
**6**

- (Germany) A Huber
- (Germany) C Singer
0
6

WC
- (United States) K Phebus
- (United States) S Starrett
3
2

1
- (United States) **G Fernández**
- (Belarus) **N Zvereva**
**6**
**7**

- (France) **A Dechaume-Balleret**
- (France) **S Testud**
**6**
**6**

5
- (United States) L McNeil
- (United States) L Raymond
2
5

- (Germany) A Kerek
- (Slovakia) D Szabova
0
1

- (France) A Dechaume-Balleret
- (France) S Testud
2
1

- (Italy) R Grande
- (South Africa) J Kruger
4
3

5
- (United States) **L McNeil**
- (United States) **L Raymond**
**6**
**6**

5
- (United States) **L McNeil**
- (United States) **L Raymond**
**6**
**6**

1
- (United States) **G Fernández**
- (Belarus) **N Zvereva**
**6**
**7**

- (Australia) R McQuillan
- (United States) S Stafford
1
6

4
- (Spain) **C Martínez**
- (Argentina) **P Tarabini**
3
**6**
**6**

- (United States) **A Grossman**
- (United States) **K Po**
**6**
**6**

- (United States) A Grossman
- (United States) K Po
**6**
3
3

- (Slovakia) K Habšudová
- (Ukraine) N Medvedeva
3
1

4
- (Spain) C Martínez
- (Argentina) P Tarabini
0
5

- (United Kingdom) V Lake
- (Australia) L Pleming
2
**6**
1

- (Australia) **R McQuillan**
- (United States) **S Stafford**
**6**
**7**

- (United States) **K Rinaldi-Stunkel**
- (United States) **R White**
**6**
4
**6**

- (United States) K Rinaldi-Stunkel
- (United States) R White

- (Australia) **R McQuillan**
- (United States) **S Stafford**
3
**7**
**7**

- (Australia) **R McQuillan**
- (United States) **S Stafford**
**w/o**

7
- (Russia) E Makarova
- (Russia) E Maniokova
**6**
6
5

=== Bottom half ===
First round

Second round

Quarterfinals

Semifinals

6
- (France) **J Halard**
- (France) **N Tauziat**
**6**
3
**6**

- (Canada) J Hetherington
- (Australia) K Radford
2
**6**
3

6
- (France) **J Halard**
- (France) **N Tauziat**
**6**
**6**

WC
- (United Kingdom) J Harper
- (United States) C MacGregor
**6**
5
4

- (South Africa) A Coetzer
- (South Africa) R Nideffer
1
4

- (South Africa) **A Coetzer**
- (South Africa) **R Nideffer**
3
**7**
**6**

6
- (France) **J Halard**
- (France) **N Tauziat**
**6**
4
**6**

- (Romania) C Cristea
- (United States) A Keller
3
5

3
- (United States) P Fendick
- (United States) M J Fernández
3
**6**
4

- (United States) **M Werdel-Witmeyer**
- (United States) **T Whitlinger-Jones**
**6**
**7**

- (United States) M Werdel-Witmeyer
- (United States) T Whitlinger-Jones
3
6

3
- (United States) **P Fendick**
- (United States) **M J Fernández**
**6**
**7**

6
- (France) J Halard
- (France) N Tauziat
2
2

8
- (Indonesia) **Y Basuki**
- (Netherlands) **C Vis**
**6**
**7**

2
- (Latvia) **L Neiland**
- (Argentina) **G Sabatini**
**6**
**6**

- (Japan) R Hiraki
- (Argentina) F Labat
1
6

8
- (Indonesia) **Y Basuki**
- (Netherlands) **C Vis**
**6**
4
**6**

- (Australia) **N Bradtke**
- (Canada) **P Hy-Boulais**
**7**
**6**

- (Australia) N Bradtke
- (Canada) P Hy-Boulais
3
**6**
2

- (Sweden) Å Carlsson
- (Japan) A Sugiyama
6
2

8
- (Indonesia) Y Basuki
- (Netherlands) C Vis
4
4

- (Finland) **N Dahlman**
- (United Kingdom) **C Wood**
**6**
**7**

2
- (Latvia) **L Neiland**
- (Argentina) **G Sabatini**
**6**
**6**

- (Netherlands) K Boogert
- (United States) C Rubin
3
6

- (Finland) N Dahlman
- (United Kingdom) C Wood
2
3

2
- (Latvia) **L Neiland**
- (Argentina) **G Sabatini**
**6**
**6**
