= 1997 Acura Classic =

Coordinates: 33°54′00.4″N 118°23′24.8″W

- Date: August 4–10, 1997
- Edition: 24th
- Category: Tier II
- Draw: 28S / 16D
- Prize money: $450,000
- Surface: Hard / outdoor
- Location: Manhattan Beach, California, U.S.
- Venue: Manhattan Country Club

Champions

Singles
- (United States) Monica Seles

Doubles
- (Indonesia) Yayuk Basuki / (Netherlands) Caroline Vis
← 1996 ·	WTA Los Angeles	· 1998 →

The 1997 Acura Classic was a women's tennis tournament held between August 4 through August 10, 1997 and played on outdoor hardcourts at the Manhattan Country Club in Manhattan Beach, California. It was twe 24th edition of the tournament and was part of the WTA Tier II series of the 1997 WTA Tour. Second-seeded Monica Seles won the singles title for the third time after 1990 and 1993.

== Finals ==
=== Singles ===
(United States) Monica Seles defeated (United States) Lindsay Davenport 5–7, 7–5, 6–4

- It was Seles' 1st singles title of the year and the 39th of her career.

=== Doubles ===
(Indonesia) Yayuk Basuki / (Netherlands) Caroline Vis defeated (Latvia) Larisa Savchenko / (Czech Republic) Helena Suková 7–6, 6–3

- It was Basuki's 1st doubles title of the year and the 6th of her career. It was Vis' 1st doubles title of the year and the 3rd of her career.
