= 1994 Virginia Slims of Los Angeles – Singles =

Singles
- 1994 Virginia Slims of Los Angeles

Final
- Champion: (United States) Amy Frazier
- Runner-up: (United States) Ann Grossman
- Score: 6–1, 6–3

Details
- Draw: 56 (2WC/8Q/1LL)
- Seeds: 16

Events
Singles	Doubles
← 1993 ·	LA Women's Tennis Championships	· 1995 →

Martina Navratilova was the defending champion, but lost in the third round to Ann Grossman.

Amy Frazier won the title by defeating Grossman 6–1, 6–3 in the final.

== Seeds ==
The first eight seeds received a bye into the second round.

1. (Spain) Conchita Martínez (quarterfinals)
2. (United States) Martina Navratilova (third round)
3. (United States) ~~Lindsay Davenport~~ (withdrew)
4. (Czech Republic) Jana Novotná (quarterfinals)
5. (United States) Zina Garrison Jackson (quarterfinals)
6. (Germany) Anke Huber (third round)
7. (France) Julie Halard (semifinals)
8. (Belgium) Sabine Appelmans (semifinals)
9. (France) Nathalie Tauziat (third round)
10. (United States) Amy Frazier (champion)
11. (Ukraine) Natalia Medvedeva (first round)
12. (United States) Patty Fendick (third round)
13. (United States) Ann Grossman (final)
14. (Germany) Marketa Kochta (first round)
15. (United States) Kimberly Po (third round)
16. (United States) Pam Shriver (second round)

== Draw ==
=== Key ===
- Q = Qualifier
- WC = Wild card
- LL = Lucky loser
- Alt = Alternate
- SE = Special exempt
- PR = Protected ranking
- ITF = ITF entry
- JE = Junior exempt
- w/o = Walkover
- r = Retired
- d = Defaulted
- SR = Special ranking

=== Finals ===
Quarterfinals
1	(Spain) Conchita Martínez	4	6^{1}
10	(United States) Amy Frazier	6	7^{7}
4	(Czech Republic) Jana Novotná	4	6	4
8	(Belgium) Sabine Appelmans	6	4	6
7	(France) Julie Halard	3	6	6
(Canada) Patricia Hy	6	2	4
5	(United States) Zina Garrison Jackson	6	6^{5}	2
13	(United States) Ann Grossman	3	7^{7}	6

Semifinals
10	(United States) Amy Frazier	6	6
8	(Belgium) Sabine Appelmans	2	4
7	(France) Julie Halard	6	3	1
13	(United States) Ann Grossman	1	6	6

Final
10	(United States) Amy Frazier	6	6
13	(United States) Ann Grossman	1	3

=== Top half ===
==== Section 1 ====
First round
(United States) L Raymond	6	6
Q	(Italy) R Grande	2	3
(Kazakhstan) E Likhovtseva	6	6
(United States) G Fernández	4	1
Q	(United States) E deLone	6^{5}	5
16	(United States) P Shriver	7^{7}	7
10	(United States) A Frazier	6	4
(Czech Republic) A Strnadová	0	1^{r}
(Germany) C Singer	7	7
(South Africa) J Kruger	5	5
(Netherlands) S Rottier	6	7
(United States) J Watanabe	4	5

Second round
1	(Spain) C Martínez	6	3	6
(United States) L Raymond	0	6	1
(Kazakhstan) E Likhovtseva	6	3	7
16	(United States) P Shriver	0	6	5
10	(United States) A Frazier	6	6
(Germany) C Singer	1	2
(Netherlands) S Rottier	2	1
6	(Germany) A Huber	6	6

Third round
1	(Spain) C Martínez	6	6
(Kazakhstan) E Likhovtseva	0	0
10	(United States) A Frazier	6	7
6	(Germany) A Huber	0	5

Quarterfinals
1	(Spain) C Martínez	4	6^{1}
10	(United States) A Frazier	6	7^{7}

==== Section 2 ====
First round
(France) K Quentrec	6	2	1
(Germany) K Kschwendt	3	6	6
(Italy) L Golarsa	6	6
(Italy) Ad Serra Zanetti	2	4
(United States) C Kuhlman	4	6^{8}
12	(United States) P Fendick	6	7^{10}
14	(Germany) M Kochta	5	2
(Argentina) MJ Gaidano	7	6
(France) S Testud	6	7^{7}
(Netherlands) M Bollegraf	1	6^{3}
(United States) T Whitlinger-Jones	6	6
(Australia) J Byrne	2	3

Second round
4	(Czech Republic) J Novotná	6	6
(Germany) K Kschwendt	3	2
(Italy) L Golarsa	6	4	1
12	(United States) P Fendick	3	6	6
(Argentina) MJ Gaidano	3	3
(France) S Testud	6	6
(United States) T Whitlinger-Jones	2	6	2
8	(Belgium) S Appelmans	6	1	6

Third round
4	(Czech Republic) J Novotná	6	6
12	(United States) P Fendick	3	3
(France) S Testud	7	1	5
8	(Belgium) S Appelmans	5	6	7

Quarterfinals
4	(Czech Republic) J Novotná	4	6	4
8	(Belgium) S Appelmans	6	4	6

=== Bottom half ===
==== Section 3 ====
First round
(Argentina) P Suárez	5	3
WC	(United States) A Mall	7	6
(Japan) K Nagatsuka	4	7	7^{7}
(Japan) N Miyagi	6	5	6^{4}
(Mexico) A Gavaldón	6	6
11	(Ukraine) N Medvedeva	2	2
15	(United States) K Po	6	6
Q	(United States) K Adams	3	2
(Australia) R McQuillan	4	5
Q	(Venezuela) M Mazzotta	6	7
WC	(United States) P Harper	2	6^{1}
(Canada) P Hy	6	7^{7}

Second round
7	(France) J Halard	6	7
WC	(United States) A Mall	4	5
(Japan) K Nagatsuka	2	1
(Mexico) A Gavaldón	6	6
15	(United States) K Po	6	6
Q	(Venezuela) M Mazzotta	3	0
(Canada) P Hy	6	6
LL	(Argentina) M Paz	0	4

Third round
7	(France) J Halard	6	6
(Mexico) A Gavaldón	4	3
15	(United States) K Po	5	0
(Canada) P Hy	7	6

Quarterfinals
7	(France) J Halard	3	6	6
(Canada) P Hy	6	2	4

==== Section 4 ====
First round
Q	(Italy) N Baudone	6^{6}	1
(United States) D Graham	7^{8}	6
(Czech Republic) E Martincová	6	4	4
(United States) A Keller	2	6	6
Q	(Canada) J Nejedly	3	4
9	(France) N Tauziat	6	6
13	(United States) A Grossman	7	6
(South Africa) T Price	5	3
Q	(Canada) R Simpson-Alter	6	1	0
(Sweden) Å Carlsson	4	6	6
Q	(Colombia) F Zuluaga	3	1
(France) A Dechaume-Balleret	6	6

Second round
5	(United States) Z Garrison Jackson	4	6	6
(United States) D Graham	6	3	4
(United States) A Keller	2	0
9	(France) N Tauziat	6	6
13	(United States) A Grossman	5	6	6
(Sweden) Å Carlsson	7	3	4
(France) A Dechaume-Balleret	3	6	6^{4}
2	(United States) M Navratilova	6	3	7^{7}

Third round
5	(United States) Z Garrison Jackson	7	1	6
9	(France) N Tauziat	5	6	4
13	(United States) A Grossman	4	7	6
2	(United States) M Navratilova	6	5	4

Quarterfinals
5	(United States) Z Garrison Jackson	6	6^{5}	2
13	(United States) A Grossman	3	7^{7}	6
