= 1988 Virginia Slims of Los Angeles =

Coordinates: 34°4′9″N 118°26′48.5″W

- Date: August 8–14
- Edition: 15th
- Category: Category 5
- Draw: 56S / 28D
- Prize money: $300,000
- Surface: Hard / outdoor
- Location: Los Angeles, California, U.S.
- Venue: Los Angeles Tennis Center

Champions

Singles
- (United States) Chris Evert

Doubles
- (United States) Patty Fendick / (Canada) Jill Hetherington
← 1987 ·	Virginia Slims of Los Angeles	· 1989 →

The 1988 Virginia Slims of Los Angeles was a women's tennis tournament played on outdoor hard courts at the Los Angeles Tennis Center in Los Angeles, California in the United States and was part of the Category 5 tier of the 1988 WTA Tour. The tournament ran from August 8 through August 14, 1988. First-seeded Chris Evert won the singles title and earned $60,000 first-prize money.

== Finals ==
=== Singles ===
(United States) Chris Evert defeated (Argentina) Gabriela Sabatini 2–6, 6–1, 6–1

- It was Evert's 3rd singles title of the year and the 156th of her career.

=== Doubles ===
(United States) Patty Fendick / (Canada) Jill Hetherington defeated (United States) Gigi Fernández / (United States) Robin White 7–6^{(7–2)}, 5–7, 6–4

- It was Fendick's 7th title of the year and the 7th of her career. It was Hetherington's 5th title of the year and the 6th of her career.
