= 1994 Virginia Slims of Los Angeles – Doubles =

Doubles
- 1994 Virginia Slims of Los Angeles

Final
- Champions: (France) Julie Halard (France) Nathalie Tauziat
- Runners-up: (Czechoslovakia) Jana Novotná (United States) Lisa Raymond
- Score: 6–1, 0–6, 6–1

Details
- Draw: 28 (2WC/1Q/1LL)
- Seeds: 8

Events
Singles	Doubles
← 1993 ·	LA Women's Tennis Championships	· 1995 →

Arantxa Sánchez Vicario and Helena Suková were the defending champions, but none competed this year.

Julie Halard and Nathalie Tauziat won the title by defeating Jana Novotná and Lisa Raymond 6–1, 0–6, 6–1 in the final.

== Seeds ==
The first four seeds received a bye into the second round.

1. (United States) Gigi Fernández / (Latvia) Larisa Neiland (quarterfinals)
2. (Netherlands) Manon Bollegraf / (United States) Martina Navratilova (quarterfinals)
3. (Czech Republic) Jana Novotná / (United States) Lisa Raymond (final)
4. (United States) Patty Fendick / (Ukraine) Natalia Medvedeva (second round)
5. (United States) Katrina Adams / (United States) Zina Garrison Jackson (quarterfinals)
6. (France) Julie Halard / (France) Nathalie Tauziat (champions)
7. (Germany) Anke Huber / (Argentina) Patricia Tarabini (first round)
8. (Italy) Laura Golarsa / (Argentina) Mercedes Paz (semifinals)

== Draw ==
=== Key ===
- Q = Qualifier
- WC = Wild card
- LL = Lucky loser
- Alt = Alternate
- SE = Special exempt
- PR = Protected ranking
- ITF = ITF entry
- JE = Junior exempt
- w/o = Walkover
- r = Retired
- d = Defaulted
- SR = Special ranking

=== Finals ===
Semifinals
6	(France) Julie Halard (France) Nathalie Tauziat	6	6
(Kazakhstan) Elena Likhovtseva (Germany) Christina Singer	1	4
3	(Czech Republic) Jana Novotná (United States) Lisa Raymond	7	6
8	(Italy) Laura Golarsa (Argentina) Mercedes Paz	5	2

Final
6	(France) Julie Halard (France) Nathalie Tauziat	6	0	6
3	(Czech Republic) Jana Novotná (United States) Lisa Raymond	1	6	1

=== Top half ===
First round
(United Kingdom) J Durie (United States) R White	6	6
(United Kingdom) V Lake (United States) J Steven	4	2
WC	(United States) J Lee (United States) D Scott	4	5
(Japan) K Nagatsuka (Greece) C Papadáki	6	7
(United States) C MacGregor (Canada) R Simpson-Alter	1	4
6	(France) J Halard (France) N Tauziat	6	6
(United States) E deLone (Australia) N Pratt	5	4
(Kazakhstan) E Likhovtseva (Germany) C Singer	7	6
(France) A Dechaume (France) K Quentrec	1	4
(United States) A Frazier (United States) K Po	6	6
(United States) A Henricksson (France) N Herreman	5	6	7^{7}
7	(Germany) A Huber (Argentina) P Tarabini	7	4	6^{0}

Second round
1	(United States) G Fernández (Latvia) L Neiland	7	5	6
(United Kingdom) J Durie (United States) R White	5	7	1
(Japan) K Nagatsuka (Greece) C Papadáki	3	3
6	(France) J Halard (France) N Tauziat	6	6
4	(United States) P Fendick (Ukraine) M Medvedeva	6	3	2
(Kazakhstan) E Likhovtseva (Germany) C Singer	1	6	6
(United States) A Frazier (United States) K Po	6	6
(United States) A Henricksson (France) N Herreman	1	2

Quarterfinals
1	(United States) G Fernández (Latvia) L Neiland	3	6	3
6	(France) J Halard (France) N Tauziat	6	3	6
(Kazakhstan) E Likhovtseva (Germany) C Singer	6	1	7^{7}
(United States) A Frazier (United States) K Po	3	6	6^{5}

Semifinals
6	(France) J Halard (France) N Tauziat	6	6
(Kazakhstan) E Likhovtseva (Germany) C Singer	1	4

=== Bottom half ===
First round
5	(United States) K Adams (United States) Z Garrison Jackson	7	6
Q	(Argentina) MJ Gaidano (Argentina) P Suárez	5	4
(Japan) R Hiraki (South Africa) T Price	7	4	6
WC	(United States) P Harper (United States) B Nagelsen	5	6	2
(United States) A Grossman (United States) D Graham	6	2	6
LL	(South Africa) J Kruger (South Africa) D Van Rensburg	1	6	4
8	(Italy) L Golarsa (Argentina) M Paz	6	6
(Belgium) S Appelmans (Australia) R McQuillan	4	3
(Australia) L Pleming (France) S Testud	6	7^{7}
(United States) C Benjamin (Australia) D Jones	3	6^{1}
(Australia) J Byrne (New Zealand) J Richardson	3	6	3
(Sweden) Å Carlsson (United States) M Jackson-Nobrega	6	0	6

Second round
5	(United States) K Adams (United States) Z Garrison Jackson	6	4	6
(Japan) R Hiraki (South Africa) T Price	4	6	2
(United States) A Grossman (United States) D Graham	6^{5}	3
3	(Czech Republic) J Novotná (United States) L Raymond	7^{7}	6
8	(Italy) L Golarsa (Argentina) M Paz	6	6
(Australia) L Pleming (France) S Testud	1	2
(Sweden) Å Carlsson (United States) M Jackson-Nobrega	1	3
2	(Netherlands) M Bollegraf (United States) M Navratilova	6	6

Quarterfinals
5	(United States) K Adams (United States) Z Garrison Jackson	1	2
3	(Czech Republic) J Novotná (United States) L Raymond	6	6
8	(Italy) L Golarsa (Argentina) M Paz	6^{3}	6	6
2	(Netherlands) M Bollegraf (United States) M Navratilova	7^{7}	4	1

Semifinals
3	(Czech Republic) J Novotná (United States) L Raymond	7	6
8	(Italy) L Golarsa (Argentina) M Paz	5	2
