= 1997 Acura Classic – Singles =

Singles
- 1997 Acura Classic
- 1996 Champion: (United States) Lindsay Davenport

Final
- Champion: (United States) Monica Seles
- Runner-up: (United States) Lindsay Davenport
- Score: 5–7, 7–5, 6–4

Details
- Draw: 28
- Seeds: 8

Events
Singles	Doubles
← 1996 ·	WTA Los Angeles	· 1998 →

Lindsay Davenport was the defending champion but lost in the final 5–7, 7–5, 6–4 against Monica Seles.

== Seeds ==
A champion seed is indicated in bold text while text in italics indicates the round in which that seed was eliminated. The top four seeds received a bye to the second round.

1. (Switzerland) Martina Hingis (semifinals)
2. (United States) **Monica Seles (champion)**
3. (South Africa) Amanda Coetzer (second round)
4. (United States) Lindsay Davenport (final)
5. (Spain) Arantxa Sánchez Vicario (quarterfinals)
6. (Germany) Anke Huber (quarterfinals)
7. (Romania) Irina Spîrlea (first round)
8. (United States) Kimberly Po (second round)

== Draw ==
=== Key ===
- Q = Qualifier
- WC = Wild card
- LL = Lucky loser
- Alt = Alternate
- ITF = ITF entry
- PR = Protected ranking
- SR = Special ranking
- SE = Special exempt
- JE = Junior exempt
- JR = Junior Accelerator Programme entrant
- CO = College Accelerator Programme entrant
- NG = Next Gen Accelerator Program entrant
- w/o = Walkover
- r = Retired
- d = Defaulted

=== Final ===
Final
4	(United States) Lindsay Davenport	**7**	5	4
2	(United States) **Monica Seles**	5	**7**	**6**

=== Section 1 ===
First round
(France) **A-G Sidot**	**6**	**6**
(Russia) E Likhovtseva	3	2
WC	(United States) **V Williams**	**6**	**6**
Q	(United States) A Grossman	0	3
WC	(Russia) A Kournikova	0	1
6	(Germany) **A Huber**	**6**	**6**
(Indonesia) **Y Basuki**	3	**7**	**6**
(Belgium) S Appelmans	**6**	6	1
(Bulgaria) M Maleeva	4	6
(France) **N Tauziat**	**6**	**7**
Q	(Spain) M Serna	5	1
8	(United States) **K Po**	**7**	**6**

Second round
1	(Switzerland) **M Hingis**	**6**	**6**
(France) A-G Sidot	2	2
WC	(United States) V Williams	6	4
6	(Germany) **A Huber**	**7**	**6**
4	(United States) **L Davenport**	**6**	**6**
(Indonesia) Y Basuki	1	1
(France) **N Tauziat**	**7**	4	**6**
8	(United States) K Po	6	**6**	4

Quarterfinals
1	(Switzerland) **M Hingis**	**6**	**6**
6	(Germany) A Huber	3	0
4	(United States) **L Davenport**	**6**	3	**6**
(France) N Tauziat	1	**6**	3

Semifinals
1	(Switzerland) M Hingis	2	**6**	4
4	(United States) **L Davenport**	**6**	4	**6**

=== Section 2 ===
First round
5	(Spain) **A Sánchez Vicario**	**6**	**7**
(Japan) N Sawamatsu	2	6
(Japan) **A Sugiyama**	3	**6**	**6**
(Czech Republic) H Suková	**6**	2	3
(United States) **A Frazier**	**6**	**6**
Q	(Russia) T Panova	1	0
7	(Romania) I Spîrlea	4	3
(Belarus) **N Zvereva**	**6**	**6**
Q	(Japan) N Kijimuta	6	5
(Romania) **R Dragomir**	**7**	**7**
(United States) C Rubin	4	2
(France) **S Testud**	**6**	**6**

Second round
5	(Spain) **A Sánchez Vicario**	**6**	**7**
(Japan) A Sugiyama	3	5
(United States) **A Frazier**	**6**	**6**
3	(South Africa) A Coetzer	1	3
(Belarus) **N Zvereva**	**6**	4	**7**
(Romania) R Dragomir	2	**6**	6
(France) S Testud	**7**	6	3
2	(United States) **M Seles**	6	**7**	**6**

Quarterfinals
5	(Spain) A Sánchez Vicario	**6**	1	3
(United States) **A Frazier**	3	**6**	**6**
(Belarus) N Zvereva	1	1
2	(United States) **M Seles**	**6**	**6**

Semifinals
(United States) A Frazier	0	2
2	(United States) **M Seles**	**6**	**6**
