= 1995 Acura Classic – Singles =

Singles
- 1995 Acura Classic
- 1994 Champion: (United States) Amy Frazier

Final
- Champion: (Spain) Conchita Martínez
- Runner-up: (United States) Chanda Rubin
- Score: 4–6, 6–1, 6–3

Details
- Draw: 48
- Seeds: 16

Events
Singles	Doubles
← 1994 ·	WTA Los Angeles	· 1996 →

Amy Frazier was the defending champion but did not compete that year.

Conchita Martínez won in the final 4–6, 6–1, 6–3 against Chanda Rubin.

== Seeds ==
A champion seed is indicated in bold text while text in italics indicates the round in which that seed was eliminated. All sixteen seeds received a bye to the second round.

1. (Spain) Arantxa Sánchez Vicario (semifinals)
2. (Spain) **Conchita Martínez (champion)**
3. (Argentina) Gabriela Sabatini (quarterfinals)
4. (United States) Lindsay Davenport (quarterfinals)
5. (Germany) Anke Huber (quarterfinals)
6. (Belarus) Natasha Zvereva (quarterfinals)
7. (United States) Mary Joe Fernández (second round)
8. (Japan) Naoko Sawamatsu (second round)
9. (France) Nathalie Tauziat (third round)
10. (United States) Chanda Rubin (final)
11. (United States) Lisa Raymond (second round)
12. (South Africa) Amanda Coetzer (third round)
13. n/a
14. (Slovakia) Karina Habšudová (third round)
15. (France) Julie Halard (third round)
16. (Belgium) Sabine Appelmans (third round)

== Draw ==
=== Key ===
- Q = Qualifier
- WC = Wild card
- LL = Lucky loser
- Alt = Alternate
- SE = Special exempt
- PR = Protected ranking
- ITF = ITF entry
- JE = Junior exempt
- w/o = Walkover
- r = Retired
- d = Defaulted
- SR = Special ranking

=== Finals ===
Semifinals
1	(Spain) Arantxa Sánchez Vicario	3	1
10	(United States) **Chanda Rubin**	**6**	**6**
(Indonesia) Yayuk Basuki	1	6
2	(Spain) **Conchita Martínez**	**6**	**7**

Final
10	(United States) Chanda Rubin	**6**	1	3
2	(Spain) **Conchita Martínez**	4	**6**	**6**

=== Top half ===
==== Section 1 ====
First round
WC	(United States) **K Rinaldi-Stunkel**	2	**6**	**7**
(United States) L McNeil	**6**	3	6
(United States) T Whitlinger-Jones	**6**	1	5
(Japan) **M Endo**	4	**6**	**7**
(Sweden) **Å Carlsson**	**6**	**6**
WC	(United States) V Williams	4	1
(France) S Testud	0	4
(Argentina) **F Labat**	**6**	**6**

Second round
1	(Spain) **A Sánchez Vicario**	**w/o**
WC	(United States) K Rinaldi-Stunkel
(Japan) M Endo	4	4
16	(Belgium) **S Appelmans**	**6**	**6**
11	(United States) L Raymond	3	3
(Sweden) **Å Carlsson**	**6**	**6**
(Argentina) F Labat	2	5
6	(Belarus) **N Zvereva**	**6**	**7**

Third round
1	(Spain) **A Sánchez Vicario**	**6**	3	**6**
16	(Belgium) S Appelmans	0	**6**	2
(Sweden) Å Carlsson	**6**	3	2
6	(Belarus) **N Zvereva**	4	**6**	**6**

Quarterfinals
1	(Spain) **A Sánchez Vicario**	**6**	3	**6**
6	(Belarus) N Zvereva	2	**6**	4

==== Section 2 ====
First round
(Netherlands) **K Boogert**	**6**	**6**
(United States) L Lee	1	4
(Israel) A Smashnova	3	2
Q	(Luxembourg) **A Kremer**	**6**	**6**
(United States) **G Fernández**	**6**	**6**
Q	(United States) E deLone	3	4
(South Africa) J Kruger	5	3
Q	(Italy) **N Baudone**	**7**	**6**

Second round
3	(Argentina) **G Sabatini**	**6**	3	**7**
(Netherlands) K Boogert	4	**6**	6
Q	(Luxembourg) A Kremer	4	1
14	(Slovakia) **K Habšudová**	**6**	**6**
10	(United States) **C Rubin**	4	**6**	**7**
(United States) G Fernández	**6**	1	6
Q	(Italy) **N Baudone**	**6**	**6**
8	(Japan) N Sawamatsu	3	1

Third round
3	(Argentina) **G Sabatini**	**6**	**6**
14	(Slovakia) K Habšudová	1	2
10	(United States) **C Rubin**	**7**	3	**6**
Q	(Italy) N Baudone	6	**6**	1

Quarterfinals
3	(Argentina) G Sabatini	**7**	6	0
10	(United States) **C Rubin**	6	**7**	**6**

=== Bottom half ===
==== Section 3 ====
First round
(Indonesia) **Y Basuki**	**6**	**6**
(United States) S Stafford	4	4
(Latvia) L Neiland	3	2
(United States) **A Grossman**	**6**	**6**
Q	(Italy) **F Lubiani**	2	**6**	**6**
Q	(Canada) S Jeyaseelan	**6**	2	2
(Australia) N Bradtke	6	4
(Russia) **E Makarova**	**7**	**6**

Second round
7	(United States) M J Fernández	3	5
(Indonesia) **Y Basuki**	**6**	**7**
(United States) A Grossman	4	6
9	(France) **N Tauziat**	**6**	**7**
12	(South Africa) **A Coetzer**	**6**	**6**
Q	(Italy) F Lubiani	2	1
(Russia) E Makarova	3	4
4	(United States) **L Davenport**	**6**	**6**

Third round
(Indonesia) **Y Basuki**	**7**	**6**
9	(France) N Tauziat	6	3
12	(South Africa) A Coetzer	5	3
4	(United States) **L Davenport**	**7**	**6**

Quarterfinals
(Indonesia) **Y Basuki**	**6**	1	**6**
4	(United States) L Davenport	4	**6**	4

==== Section 4 ====
First round
Q	(Canada) **J Nejedly**	**6**	**6**
(Mexico) A Gavaldón	1	3
Q	(Finland) N Dahlman	4	2
Q	(Italy) **R Grande**	**6**	**6**
(Germany) **B Rittner**	**6**	**6**
(Russia) E Likhovtseva	3	4
(Ukraine) N Medvedeva	3	4
(Germany) **C Singer**	**6**	**6**

Second round
5	(Germany) **A Huber**	6	**7**	**7**
Q	(Canada) J Nejedly	**7**	6	5
Q	(Italy) **R Grande**	**6**	**6**
LL	(Italy) A Serra Zanetti	4	3
15	(France) **J Halard**	**6**	**6**
(Germany) B Rittner	4	2
(Germany) C Singer	3	2
2	(Spain) **C Martínez**	**6**	**6**

Third round
5	(Germany) **A Huber**	**6**	4	**7**
Q	(Italy) R Grande	4	**6**	5
15	(France) J Halard	**7**	0	3
2	(Spain) **C Martínez**	6	**6**	**6**

Quarterfinals
5	(Germany) A Huber	1	5
2	(Spain) **C Martínez**	**6**	**7**
