= 1996 Acura Classic – Doubles =

Doubles
- 1996 Acura Classic
- 1995 Champions: (United States) Gigi Fernández (Belarus) Natasha Zvereva

Final
- Champions: (United States) Lindsay Davenport (Belarus) Natasha Zvereva
- Runners-up: (United States) Amy Frazier (United States) Kimberly Po
- Score: 6–1, 6–4

Details
- Draw: 28
- Seeds: 8

Events
Singles	Doubles
← 1995 ·	WTA Los Angeles	· 1997 →

Gigi Fernández and Natasha Zvereva were the defending champions but only Zvereva competed that year with Lindsay Davenport.

Davenport and Zvereva won in the final 6–1, 6–4 against Amy Frazier and Kimberly Po.

== Seeds ==
Champion seeds are indicated in bold text while text in italics indicates the round in which those seeds were eliminated. The top four seeded teams received byes into the second round.

1. (United States) **Lindsay Davenport** / (Belarus) **Natasha Zvereva (champions)**
2. (Latvia) Larisa Neiland / (France) Nathalie Tauziat (second round)
3. (Australia) Elizabeth Smylie / (United States) Linda Wild (second round)
4. (South Africa) Amanda Coetzer / (United States) Lori McNeil (second round)
5. (Netherlands) Kristie Boogert / (Romania) Irina Spîrlea (second round)
6. (Indonesia) Yayuk Basuki / (Netherlands) Caroline Vis (second round)
7. (United States) Katrina Adams / (United States) Zina Garrison-Jackson (quarterfinals)
8. (France) Alexia Dechaume-Balleret / (France) Sandrine Testud (second round)

== Draw ==
=== Key ===
- Q = Qualifier
- WC = Wild card
- LL = Lucky loser
- Alt = Alternate
- SE = Special exempt
- PR = Protected ranking
- ITF = ITF entry
- JE = Junior exempt
- w/o = Walkover
- r = Retired
- d = Defaulted
- SR = Special ranking

=== Final ===
Final
1	(United States) **Lindsay Davenport** (Belarus) **Natasha Zvereva**	**6**	**6**
	(United States) Amy Frazier (United States) Kimberly Po	1	4

=== Top half ===
First round
(Italy) S Farina (Austria) B Schett	6	**6**	2
(Canada) **J Hetherington** (United States) **K Rinaldi-Stunkel**	**7**	3	**6**
(United States) **D Graham** (Australia) **K Radford**	**7**	**6**
(South Africa) R Nideffer (Canada) R Simpson	6	4
(Sweden) Å Carlsson (Czech Republic) L Richterová	4	1
5	(Netherlands) **K Boogert** (Romania) **I Spîrlea**	**6**	**6**
Q	(Slovakia) K Habšudová (Slovakia) K Studeníková	2	3
(Japan) **N Kijimuta** (Argentina) **F Labat**	**6**	**6**
(Italy) **R Grande** (Russia) **E Likhovtseva**	**6**	**6**
(Argentina) L Montalvo (Argentina) P Suárez	4	4
(Germany) A Huber (Germany) B Rittner	**6**	4	2
8	(France) **A Dechaume-Balleret** (France) **S Testud**	4	**6**	**6**

Second round
1	(United States) **L Davenport** (Belarus) **N Zvereva**	**6**	**6**
(Canada) J Hetherington (United States) K Rinaldi-Stunkel	4	2
(United States) **D Graham** (Australia) **K Radford**	**6**	**6**
5	(Netherlands) K Boogert (Romania) I Spîrlea	1	4
4	(South Africa) A Coetzer (United States) L McNeil	6	5
(Japan) **N Kijimuta** (Argentina) **F Labat**	**7**	**7**
(Italy) **R Grande** (Russia) **E Likhovtseva**	6	**7**	**6**
8	(France) A Dechaume-Balleret (France) S Testud	**7**	5	3

Quarterfinals
1	(United States) **L Davenport** (Belarus) **N Zvereva**	**6**	**6**
(United States) D Graham (Australia) K Radford	1	1
(Japan) N Kijimuta (Argentina) F Labat	**6**	3	1
(Italy) **R Grande** (Russia) **E Likhovtseva**	2	**6**	**6**

Semifinals
1	(United States) **L Davenport** (Belarus) **N Zvereva**	**6**	**6**
(Italy) R Grande (Russia) E Likhovtseva	2	0

=== Bottom half ===
First round
6	(Indonesia) **Y Basuki** (Netherlands) **C Vis**	**6**	**6**
WC	(Chinese Taipei) J Lee (United States) J Watanabe	2	2
(Japan) M Saeki (Japan) A Sugiyama	2	**6**	4
(United States) **A Frazier** (United States) **K Po**	**6**	2	**6**
WC	(United States) T Hiete (Australia) J Richardson	6	2
(United States) **E Hakami** (United Kingdom) **V Lake**	**7**	**6**
7	(United States) **K Adams** (United States) **Z Garrison-Jackson**	**7**	**6**
(United States) A Grossman (United States) M Werdel-Witmeyer	5	1
(Australia) **D Jones** (United States) **S Reece**	**7**	6	**6**
(France) C Dhenin (Australia) L Pleming	5	**7**	3
(France) A Fusai (Russia) E Makarova	5	**6**	5
(Japan) **R Hiraki** (Japan) **N Miyagi**	**7**	1	**7**

Second round
6	(Indonesia) Y Basuki (Netherlands) C Vis	0	2
(United States) **A Frazier** (United States) **K Po**	**6**	**6**
(United States) **E Hakami** (United Kingdom) **V Lake**	2	**7**	**6**
3	(Australia) E Smylie (United States) L Wild	**6**	6	3
7	(United States) **K Adams** (United States) **Z Garrison-Jackson**	**6**	**6**
(Australia) D Jones (United States) S Reece	1	1
(Japan) **R Hiraki** (Japan) **N Miyagi**	4	**6**	**6**
2	(Latvia) L Neiland (France) N Tauziat	**6**	3	4

Quarterfinals
(United States) **A Frazier** (United States) **K Po**	**6**	**6**
(United States) E Hakami (United Kingdom) V Lake	3	2
7	(United States) K Adams (United States) Z Garrison-Jackson	**7**	2	4
(Japan) **R Hiraki** (Japan) **N Miyagi**	6	**6**	**6**

Semifinals
(United States) **A Frazier** (United States) **K Po**	**6**	**6**
(Japan) R Hiraki (Japan) N Miyagi	0	0
