= 1996 Acura Classic – Singles =

Singles
- 1996 Acura Classic
- 1995 Champion: (Spain) Conchita Martínez

Final
- Champion: (United States) Lindsay Davenport
- Runner-up: (Germany) Anke Huber
- Score: 6–2, 6–3

Details
- Draw: 56
- Seeds: 16

Events
Singles	Doubles
← 1995 ·	WTA Los Angeles	· 1997 →

Conchita Martínez was the defending champion but did not compete that year.

Lindsay Davenport won in the final 6–2, 6–3 against Anke Huber.

== Seeds ==
A champion seed is indicated in bold text while text in italics indicates the round in which that seed was eliminated. The top eight seeds received a bye to the second round.

1. (Germany) Steffi Graf (semifinals)
2. (Germany) Anke Huber (final)
3. (Japan) Kimiko Date (quarterfinals)
4. (United States) **Lindsay Davenport (champion)**
5. (South Africa) Amanda Coetzer (quarterfinals)
6. (Romania) Irina Spîrlea (quarterfinals)
7. (Slovakia) Karina Habšudová (semifinals)
8. (United States) Amy Frazier (quarterfinals)
9. (Japan) Ai Sugiyama (third round)
10. (France) Nathalie Tauziat (second round)
11. (Belarus) Natasha Zvereva (third round)
12. (Russia) Elena Likhovtseva (first round)
13. (United States) Linda Wild (second round)
14. (Indonesia) Yayuk Basuki (first round)
15. (Slovakia) Katarína Studeníková (first round)
16. (Austria) Barbara Schett (first round)

== Draw ==
=== Key ===
- Q = Qualifier
- WC = Wild card
- LL = Lucky loser
- Alt = Alternate
- SE = Special exempt
- PR = Protected ranking
- ITF = ITF entry
- JE = Junior exempt
- w/o = Walkover
- r = Retired
- d = Defaulted
- SR = Special ranking

=== Finals ===
Semifinals
1	(Germany) Steffi Graf	3	3
4	(United States) **Lindsay Davenport**	**6**	**6**
7	(Slovakia) Karina Habšudová	6	3
2	(Germany) **Anke Huber**	**7**	**6**

Final
4	(United States) **Lindsay Davenport**	**6**	**6**
2	(Germany) Anke Huber	2	3

=== Top half ===
==== Section 1 ====
First round
Q	(United States) **K Adams**	2	**6**	**6**
(Sweden) Å Carlsson	**6**	3	4
(Czech Republic) L Richterová	6	**6**	2
WC	(United States) **V Williams**	**7**	3	**6**
(Japan) M Endo	4	**7**	4
13	(United States) **L Wild**	**6**	6	**6**
10	(France) **N Tauziat**	**6**	**6**
(United States) L Lee	2	3
(United States) A Grossman	6	0
(Italy) **S Farina**	**7**	**6**
WC	(United States) K Rinaldi-Stunkel	**6**	4	1
WC	(United States) **D Graham**	4	**6**	**6**

Second round
1	(Germany) **S Graf**	**6**	**6**
Q	(United States) K Adams	4	2
WC	(United States) **V Williams**	**6**	**6**
13	(United States) L Wild	1	2
10	(France) N Tauziat	**7**	3	2
(Italy) **S Farina**	6	**6**	**6**
WC	(United States) D Graham	6	**6**	5
8	(United States) **A Frazier**	**7**	2	**7**

Third round
1	(Germany) **S Graf**	**6**	**6**
WC	(United States) V Williams	4	4
(Italy) S Farina	4	0
8	(United States) **A Frazier**	**6**	**6**

Quarterfinals
1	(Germany) **S Graf**	**6**	**6**
8	(United States) A Frazier	4	0

==== Section 2 ====
First round
(United States) Z Garrison-Jackson	4	2
(Italy) **F Lubiani**	**6**	**6**
(Germany) **B Rittner**	**6**	**6**
Q	(Germany) C Singer	2	0
(Japan) N Kijimuta	4	2
11	(Belarus) **N Zvereva**	**6**	**6**
16	(Austria) B Schett	3	4
(Russia) **E Makarova**	**6**	**6**
(Chinese Taipei) **S-T Wang**	**6**	**6**
(China) J-Q Yi	2	1
Q	(United States) **J Watanabe**	**6**	**4**
(South Korea) S-H Park	3	1	r

Second round
4	(United States) **L Davenport**	**7**	**6**
(Italy) F Lubiani	5	2
(Germany) B Rittner	2	5
11	(Belarus) **N Zvereva**	**6**	**7**
(Russia) E Makarova	2	0
(Chinese Taipei) **S-T Wang**	**6**	**6**
Q	(United States) J Watanabe	4	0
5	(South Africa) **A Coetzer**	**6**	**6**

Third round
4	(United States) **L Davenport**	**7**	**6**
11	(Belarus) N Zvereva	5	2
(Chinese Taipei) S-T Wang	2	1
5	(South Africa) **A Coetzer**	**6**	**6**

Quarterfinals
4	(United States) **L Davenport**	**6**	4	**6**
5	(South Africa) A Coetzer	4	**6**	3

=== Bottom half ===
==== Section 3 ====
First round
Q	(Japan) M Saeki	**6**	2	3
Q	(Japan) **N Miyagi**	3	**6**	**6**
(United States) M Werdel-Witmeyer	4	**6**	2
(United States) **K Po**	**6**	3	**6**
(Germany) **P Begerow**	**7**	2	**6**
14	(Indonesia) Y Basuki	6	**6**	1
15	(Slovakia) K Studeníková	1	**6**	1
(France) **S Testud**	**6**	1	**6**
(United States) **L McNeil**	**7**	**6**
Q	(Japan) R Hiraki	5	3
(Italy) R Grande	6	**6**	4
(Spain) **G León García**	**7**	2	**6**

Second round
7	(Slovakia) **K Habšudová**	**6**	**7**
Q	(Japan) N Miyagi	2	5
(United States) **K Po**	**6**	**6**
(Germany) P Begerow	2	3
(France) **S Testud**	**7**	**7**
(United States) L McNeil	5	6
(Spain) G León García	2	**6**	4
3	(Japan) **K Date**	**6**	3	**6**

Third round
7	(Slovakia) **K Habšudová**	**6**	**6**
(United States) K Po	2	3
(France) S Testud	**6**	3	5
3	(Japan) **K Date**	1	**6**	**7**

Quarterfinals
7	(Slovakia) **K Habšudová**	**6**	4	**6**
3	(Japan) K Date	4	**6**	2

==== Section 4 ====
First round
(France) **A Fusai**	**6**	**6**
(Italy) G Pizzichini	2	0
(United States) S Cacic	3	3
Q	(Canada) **R Simpson**	**6**	**6**
(United States) A Miller	1	**6**	6
9	(Japan) **A Sugiyama**	**6**	2	**7**
12	(Russia) E Likhovtseva	2	5
(Argentina) **F Labat**	**6**	**7**
Q	(France) **A Dechaume-Balleret**	**7**	3	**6**
(Chinese Taipei) J Lee	5	**6**	1
(Netherlands) **K Boogert**	**6**	**6**
(Latvia) L Neiland	3	1

Second round
6	(Romania) **I Spîrlea**	**6**	**6**
(France) A Fusai	3	1
Q	(Canada) R Simpson	1	5
9	(Japan) **A Sugiyama**	**6**	**7**
(Argentina) **F Labat**	**6**	**6**
Q	(France) A Dechaume-Balleret	1	2
(Netherlands) K Boogert	**7**	3	3
2	(Germany) **A Huber**	5	**6**	**6**

Third round
6	(Romania) **I Spîrlea**	**6**	**6**
9	(Japan) A Sugiyama	4	2
(Argentina) F Labat	1	6
2	(Germany) **A Huber**	**6**	**7**

Quarterfinals
6	(Romania) I Spîrlea	3	**7**	4
2	(Germany) **A Huber**	**6**	6	**6**
