= 1997 Acura Classic – Doubles =

Doubles
- 1997 Acura Classic
- 1996 Champions: (United States) Lindsay Davenport (Belarus) Natasha Zvereva

Final
- Champions: (Indonesia) Yayuk Basuki (Netherlands) Caroline Vis
- Runners-up: (Latvia) Larisa Savchenko (Czech Republic) Helena Suková
- Score: 7–6, 6–3

Events
Singles	Doubles
← 1996 ·	WTA Los Angeles	· 1998 →

Lindsay Davenport and Natasha Zvereva were the defending champions but they competed with different partners that year, Davenport with Chanda Rubin and Zvereva with Gigi Fernández.

Fernández and Zvereva lost in the first round to Anna Kournikova and Ai Sugiyama, as did Davenport and Rubin to Katrina Adams and Patricia Tarabini.

Yayuk Basuki and Caroline Vis won in the final 7–6, 6–3 against Larisa Savchenko and Helena Suková.

== Seeds ==
Champion seeds are indicated in bold text while text in italics indicates the round in which those seeds were eliminated.

1. (United States) Gigi Fernández / (Belarus) Natasha Zvereva (first round)
2. (Switzerland) Martina Hingis / (Spain) Arantxa Sánchez Vicario (first round)
3. (United States) Nicole Arendt / (Netherlands) Manon Bollegraf (first round)
4. (Latvia) Larisa Savchenko / (Czech Republic) Helena Suková (final)

== Draw ==
=== Key ===
- Q = Qualifier
- WC = Wild card
- LL = Lucky loser
- Alt = Alternate
- ITF = ITF entry
- PR = Protected ranking
- SR = Special ranking
- SE = Special exempt
- JE = Junior exempt
- JR = Junior Accelerator Programme entrant
- CO = College Accelerator Programme entrant
- NG = Next Gen Accelerator Program entrant
- w/o = Walkover
- r = Retired
- d = Defaulted

First round
1	(United States) G Fernández (Belarus) N Zvereva	**7**	1	1
Q	(Russia) **A Kournikova** (Japan) **A Sugiyama**	5	**6**	**6**
(Belgium) S Appelmans (United States) L Wild	0	4
(United States) **L Raymond** (Australia) **R Stubbs**	**6**	**6**
4	(Latvia) **L Savchenko** (Czech Republic) **H Suková**	**6**	**7**
(France) A Fusai (France) N Tauziat	3	5
(Romania) **R Dragomir** (Russia) **E Likhovtseva**	**6**	4	**6**
(United States) L McNeil (Romania) I Spîrlea	3	**6**	2
(United States) **A Frazier** (United States) **K Po**	**6**	**6**
(Belarus) O Barabanschikova (Australia) L Pleming	2	4
(Indonesia) **Y Basuki** (Netherlands) **C Vis**	4	**6**	**6**
3	(United States) N Arendt (Netherlands) M Bollegraf	**6**	4	3
(United States) L Davenport (United States) C Rubin	2	5
(United States) **K Adams** (Argentina) **P Tarabini**	**6**	**7**
(Japan) **R Hiraki** (Japan) **N Kijimuta**	**6**	**6**
2	(Switzerland) M Hingis (Spain) A Sánchez Vicario	4	4

Quarterfinals
Q	(Russia) **A Kournikova** (Japan) **A Sugiyama**	**6**	**6**
(United States) L Raymond (Australia) R Stubbs	2	2
4	(Latvia) **L Savchenko** (Czech Republic) **H Suková**	**6**	3	**6**
(Romania) R Dragomir (Russia) E Likhovtseva	3	**6**	1
(United States) A Frazier (United States) K Po	2	4
(Indonesia) **Y Basuki** (Netherlands) **C Vis**	**6**	**6**
(United States) K Adams (Argentina) P Tarabini	3	4
(Japan) **R Hiraki** (Japan) **N Kijimuta**	**6**	**6**

Semifinals
Q	(Russia) A Kournikova (Japan) A Sugiyama	6	1
4	(Latvia) **L Savchenko** (Czech Republic) **H Suková**	**7**	**6**
(Indonesia) **Y Basuki** (Netherlands) **C Vis**	**6**	**2**
(Japan) R Hiraki (Japan) N Kijimuta	3	1	r

Final
4	(Latvia) Larisa Savchenko (Czech Republic) Helena Suková	6	3
(Indonesia) **Yayuk Basuki** (Netherlands) **Caroline Vis**	**7**	**6**
