= 1989 Virginia Slims of Los Angeles =

- Date: August 7–13
- Edition: 16th
- Category: 5
- Draw: 56S / 28D
- Prize money: $300,000
- Surface: Hard / outdoor
- Location: Manhattan Beach, CA, U.S.
- Venue: Manhattan Country Club

Champions

Singles
- (United States) Martina Navratilova

Doubles
- (United States) Martina Navratilova (Australia) Wendy Turnbull
← 1988 ·	Virginia Slims of Los Angeles	· 1990 →

The 1989 Virginia Slims of Los Angeles was a women's tennis tournament played on outdoor hard courts at the Manhattan Country Club in Manhattan Beach, California in the United States that was part of the Category 5 tier of the 1989 WTA Tour. It was the 16th edition of the tournament and was held from August 7 through August 13, 1989. First-seeded Martina Navratilova won the singles title, her sixth at the event.

== Finals ==
=== Singles ===
(United States) Martina Navratilova defeated (Argentina) Gabriela Sabatini 6–0, 6–2

- It was Navratilova's 5th singles title of the year and the 143rd of her career.

=== Doubles ===
(United States) Martina Navratilova / (Australia) Wendy Turnbull defeated (United States) Mary Joe Fernández / (West Germany) Claudia Kohde-Kilsch 5–2 (Fernández and Kohde-Kilsch retired)

- It was Navratilova's 9th title of the year and the 290th of her career. It was Turnbull's only title of the year and the 58th of her career.
