= 1994 Virginia Slims of Los Angeles =

- Date: August 8–14
- Edition: 21st
- Category: Tier II
- Draw: 56S / 28D
- Prize money: $400,000
- Surface: Hard / outdoor
- Location: Manhattan Beach, CA, U.S.
- Venue: Manhattan Country Club

Champions

Singles
- (United States) Amy Frazier

Doubles
- (France) Julie Halard / (France) Nathalie Tauziat
← 1993 ·	WTA Los Angeles	· 1995 →

The 1994 Virginia Slims of Los Angeles was a women's tennis tournament played on outdoor hard courts at the Manhattan Country Club in Manhattan Beach, California in the United States that was part of the Tier II category of the 1994 WTA Tour. It was the 21st edition of the tournament and was held from August 8 through August 14, 1994. Tenth-seeded Amy Frazier won the singles title and earned $80,000 first-prize money.

== Finals ==
=== Singles ===
(United States) Amy Frazier defeated (United States) Ann Grossman 6–1, 6–3

- It was Frazier's 1st singles title of the year and the 4th of her career.

=== Doubles ===
(France) Julie Halard / (France) Nathalie Tauziat defeated (Czech Republic) Jana Novotná / (United States) Lisa Raymond 6–1, 0–6, 6–1
