= 1995 Acura Classic =

- Date: August 7–13
- Edition: 22nd
- Category: Tier II
- Draw: 48S / 28D
- Prize money: $430,000
- Surface: Hard / outdoor
- Location: Manhattan Beach, California, U.S.
- Venue: Manhattan Country Club

Champions

Singles
- (Spain) Conchita Martínez

Doubles
- (United States) Gigi Fernández / (Belarus) Natasha Zvereva
← 1994 ·	WTA Los Angeles	· 1996 →

The 1995 Acura Classic was a tennis tournament played on outdoor hard courts at the Manhattan Country Club in Manhattan Beach, California in the United States that was part of Tier II of the 1995 WTA Tour. It was the 22nd edition of the tournament and was held from August 7 through August 13, 1995. Second-seeded Conchita Martínez won the singles title and earned $79,500 first-prize money.

== Finals ==
=== Singles ===
(Spain) Conchita Martínez defeated (United States) Chanda Rubin 4–6, 6–1, 6–3

- It was Martínez's 6th singles title of the year and the 26th of her career.

=== Doubles ===
(United States) Gigi Fernández / (Belarus) Natasha Zvereva defeated (Argentina) Gabriela Sabatini / (Latvia) Larisa Savchenko 7–5, 6–7, 7–5

- It was Fernández's 6th title of the year and the 61st of her career. It was Zvereva's 5th title of the year and the 60th of her career.
