= 1993 Virginia Slims of Los Angeles =

- Date: August 9–15
- Edition: 20th
- Category: Tier II
- Draw: 56S / 28D
- Prize money: $375,000
- Surface: Hard / outdoor
- Location: Manhattan Beach, California, U.S.
- Venue: Manhattan Country Club

Champions

Singles
- (United States) Martina Navratilova

Doubles
- (Spain) Arantxa Sánchez Vicario; (Czechoslovakia) Helena Suková
← 1992 ·	Virginia Slims of Los Angeles	· 1994 →

The 1993 Virginia Slims of Los Angeles was a women's tennis tournament played on outdoor hard courts at the Manhattan Country Club in Manhattan Beach, California in the United States that was part of the Tier II category of the 1993 WTA Tour. It was the 20th edition of the tournament and was held from August 9 through August 15, 1993. Second-seeded Martina Navratilova won the singles title, her eighth at the event, and earned $75,000 first-prize money.

== Finals ==
=== Singles ===
(United States) Martina Navratilova defeated (Spain) Arantxa Sánchez Vicario 7–5, 7–6^{(7–4)}

- It was Navratilova's 4th singles title of the year and the 164th of her career.

=== Doubles ===
(Spain) Arantxa Sánchez Vicario / (Czechoslovakia) Helena Suková defeated (United States) Gigi Fernández / (Belarus) Natasha Zvereva 7–6^{(7–3)}, 6–3

- It was Sánchez Vicario's 3rd doubles title of the year and the 21st of her career. It was Suková's 6th doubles title of the year and the 59th of her career.

== See also ==
- 1993 Volvo Tennis/Los Angeles – men's tournament
