= 1987 Virginia Slims of Los Angeles =

Coordinates: 34°4′9″N 118°26′48.5″W

- Date: August 10–16
- Edition: 14th
- Category: Category 4
- Draw: 56S / 28D
- Prize money: $250,000
- Surface: Hard / outdoor
- Location: Manhattan Beach, California, U.S.
- Venue: Manhattan Beach Club

Champions

Singles
- (West Germany) Steffi Graf

Doubles
- (United States) Martina Navratilova / (United States) Pam Shriver
← 1986 ·	Virginia Slims of Los Angeles	· 1988 →

The 1987 Virginia Slims of Los Angeles was a women's tennis tournament played on outdoor hard courts at the Manhattan Beach Club in Manhattan Beach, California in the United States and was part of the Category 4 tier of the 1987 WTA Tour. The tournament ran from August 10 through August 16, 1987. Second-seeded Steffi Graf won the singles title and earned $50,000 first-prize money. As a result of her tournament win she became the world No. 1 ranked player for the first time in her career.

== Finals ==
=== Singles ===
(West Germany) Steffi Graf defeated (United States) Chris Evert 6–3, 6–4

- It was Graf's 8th singles title of the year and the 16th of her career.

=== Doubles ===
(United States) Martina Navratilova / (United States) Pam Shriver defeated (United States) Zina Garrison / (United States) Lori McNeil 6–3, 6–4
