= 1990 Virginia Slims of Los Angeles =

- Date: August 13–19
- Edition: 17th
- Category: Tier II
- Draw: 56S / 28D
- Prize money: $350,000
- Surface: Hard / outdoor
- Location: Manhattan Beach, CA, U.S.
- Venue: Manhattan Country Club

Champions

Singles
- (Socialist Federal Republic of Yugoslavia) Monica Seles

Doubles
- (United States) Gigi Fernández / (Czechoslovakia) Jana Novotná
| ← 1989 · | Virginia Slims of Los Angeles | · 1991 → |

The 1990 Virginia Slims of Los Angeles was a women's tennis tournament played on outdoor hard courts at the Manhattan Country Club in Manhattan Beach, California in the United States that was part of the Tier II category of the 1990 WTA Tour. It was the 17th edition of the tournament and was held from August 13 through August 19, 1990. Second-seeded Monica Seles won the singles title and earned $70,000 first-prize money.

== Finals ==
=== Singles ===
(Socialist Federal Republic of Yugoslavia) Monica Seles defeated (United States) Martina Navratilova 6–4, 3–6, 7–6^{(8–6)}

- It was Seles' 7th singles title of the year and the 8th of her career.

=== Doubles ===
(United States) Gigi Fernández / (Czechoslovakia) Jana Novotná defeated (Argentina) Mercedes Paz / (Argentina) Gabriela Sabatini 6–3, 4–6, 6–4
