= 1992 Virginia Slims of Los Angeles =

- Date: August 10–16
- Edition: 19th
- Category: Tier II
- Draw: 28S / 16D
- Prize money: $350,000
- Surface: Hard / outdoor
- Location: Manhattan Beach, CA, U.S.
- Venue: Manhattan Country Club

Champions

Singles
- (United States) Martina Navratilova

Doubles
- (Spain) Arantxa Sánchez Vicario (Czechoslovakia) Helena Suková
← 1991 ·	Virginia Slims of Los Angeles	· 1993 →

The 1992 Virginia Slims of Los Angeles was a women's tennis tournament played on outdoor hard courts at the Manhattan Country Club in Manhattan Beach, California in the United States that was part of the Tier II category of the 1992 WTA Tour. It was the 19th edition of the tournament and was held from August 10 through August 16, 1992. Second-seeded Martina Navratilova won the singles title, her seventh at the event, and earned $70,000 first-prize money.

== Finals ==
=== Singles ===
(United States) Martina Navratilova defeated (Federal Republic of Yugoslavia) Monica Seles 6–4, 6–2

- It was Navratilova's 3rd singles title of the year and the 160th of her career.

=== Doubles ===
(Spain) Arantxa Sánchez Vicario / (Czechoslovakia) Helena Suková defeated (United States) Zina Garrison-Jackson / (United States) Pam Shriver 6–4, 6–2
