= 2024 Internationaux de Strasbourg =

- Date: 19–25 May
- Edition: 38th
- Category: WTA 500
- Draw: 28S / 16D
- Prize money: $922,573
- Surface: Clay
- Location: Strasbourg, France
- Venue: Tennis Club de Strasbourg

Champions

Singles
- (United States) Madison Keys

Doubles
- (Spain) Cristina Bucșa / (Romania) Monica Niculescu
← 2023 ·	Internationaux de Strasbourg	· 2025 →

The 2024 Internationaux de Strasbourg was a women's professional tennis tournament played on outdoor clay courts in Strasbourg, France. It was the 38th edition of the tournament and part of the WTA 500 tournaments of the 2024 WTA Tour (upgraded from WTA 250 status in previous years). It took place at the Tennis Club de Strasbourg between 19 and 25 May 2024.

== Finals ==
=== Singles ===
- (United States) Madison Keys def. (United States) Danielle Collins 6–1, 6–2

=== Doubles ===
- (Spain) Cristina Bucșa / (Romania) Monica Niculescu def. (United States) Asia Muhammad / (Indonesia) Aldila Sutjiadi 3–6, 6–4, [10–6]

== Singles main-draw entrants ==
=== Seeds ===
Country	Player	Rank^{1}	Seed
CZE	Markéta Vondroušová	6	1
BRA	Beatriz Haddad Maia	13	2
USA	Danielle Collins	15	3
USA	Madison Keys	16	4
	Liudmila Samsonova	17	5
	Ekaterina Alexandrova	18	6
UKR	Elina Svitolina	19	7
	Anastasia Pavlyuchenkova	21	8

- Rankings are as of 6 May 2024.

=== Other entrants ===
The following players received wildcards into the singles main draw:

- (France) Alizé Cornet
- (France) Fiona Ferro
- (Czech Republic) Karolína Plíšková
- (Czech Republic) Markéta Vondroušová

The following players received entry from the qualifying draw:

- Erika Andreeva
- (Spain) Cristina Bucșa
- (Poland) Magdalena Fręch
- (Kazakhstan) Yulia Putintseva

=== Withdrawals ===
- (Belgium) Elise Mertens → replaced by (China) Wang Xinyu
- (Czech Republic) Linda Nosková → replaced by (Poland) Magda Linette
- (Italy) Jasmine Paolini → replaced by (Czech Republic) Kateřina Siniaková
- (United States) Jessica Pegula → replaced by Anastasia Potapova
- (Ukraine) Dayana Yastremska → replaced by (France) Clara Burel

== Doubles main-draw entrants ==
=== Seeds ===
Country	Player	Country	Player	Rank^{1}	Seed
USA	Nicole Melichar-Martinez	AUS	Ellen Perez	14	1
NED	Demi Schuurs	BRA	Luisa Stefani	21	2
JPN	Shuko Aoyama	UKR	Lyudmyla Kichenok	38	3
USA	Desirae Krawczyk	USA	Bethanie Mattek-Sands	40	4

- ^{1} Rankings as of 6 May 2024.

=== Other entrants ===
The following pair received a wildcards into the doubles main draw:

- (France) Chloé Paquet / (France) Diane Parry
