= 1998 Internationaux de Strasbourg – Doubles =

Doubles
- 1998 Internationaux de Strasbourg
- 1997 Champions: (Czech Republic) Helena Suková (Belarus) Natasha Zvereva

Final
- Champions: (France) Alexandra Fusai (France) Nathalie Tauziat
- Runners-up: (Indonesia) Yayuk Basuki (Netherlands) Caroline Vis
- Score: 6–4, 6–3

Events
Singles	Doubles
← 1997 ·	Internationaux de Strasbourg	· 1999 →

Helena Suková and Natasha Zvereva were the defending champions but did not compete that year.

Alexandra Fusai and Nathalie Tauziat won in the final 6–4, 6–3 against Yayuk Basuki and Caroline Vis.

== Seeds ==
Champion seeds are indicated in bold text while text in italics indicates the round in which those seeds were eliminated.

1. (France) **Alexandra Fusai** / (France) **Nathalie Tauziat (champions)**
2. (Indonesia) Yayuk Basuki / (Netherlands) Caroline Vis (final)
3. (Russia) Elena Likhovtseva / (Japan) Ai Sugiyama (semifinals)
4. (Japan) Naoko Kijimuta / (Japan) Nana Miyagi (semifinals)

== Draw ==
=== Key ===
- Q = Qualifier
- WC = Wild card
- LL = Lucky loser
- Alt = Alternate
- SE = Special exempt
- PR = Protected ranking
- ITF = ITF entry
- JE = Junior exempt
- w/o = Walkover
- r = Retired
- d = Defaulted
- SR = Special ranking

First round
1	(France) **A Fusai** (France) **N Tauziat**	**7**	**7**
(United States) K Adams (South Africa) M de Swardt	5	6
(Canada) **S Jeyaseelan** (Czech Republic) **E Melicharová**	**6**	**6**
(Chinese Taipei) J Lee (Chinese Taipei) S-T Wang	4	4
4	(Japan) **N Kijimuta** (Japan) **N Miyagi**	**6**	**6**
(Australia) D Jones (Japan) M Saeki	2	3
(Romania) C Cristea (Argentina) L Montalvo	2	0
(France) **J Halard-Decugis** (Argentina) **P Suárez**	**6**	**6**
(Belarus) **O Barabanschikova** (Australia) **A Ellwood**	**6**	1	**6**
Q	(France) C Dhenin (France) É Loit	1	**6**	3
(Italy) R Grande (Romania) I Spîrlea	1	**6**	6
3	(Russia) **E Likhovtseva** (Japan) **A Sugiyama**	**6**	4	**7**
(Thailand) T Tanasugarn (Czech Republic) H Vildová	6	5
LL	(Australia) **L McShea** (Australia) **T Musgrave**	**7**	**7**
WC	(France) A Cocheteux (France) S Pitkowski	**7**	5	4
2	(Indonesia) **Y Basuki** (Netherlands) **C Vis**	5	**7**	**6**

Quarterfinals
1	(France) **A Fusai** (France) **N Tauziat**	**w/o**
(Canada) S Jeyaseelan (Czech Republic) E Melicharová
4	(Japan) **N Kijimuta** (Japan) **N Miyagi**	**7**	**6**
(France) J Halard-Decugis (Argentina) P Suárez	5	1
(Belarus) O Barabanschikova (Australia) A Ellwood	4	0
3	(Russia) **E Likhovtseva** (Japan) **A Sugiyama**	**6**	**6**
LL	(Australia) L McShea (Australia) T Musgrave	**6**	3	0
2	(Indonesia) **Y Basuki** (Netherlands) **C Vis**	3	**6**	**6**

Semifinals
1	(France) **A Fusai** (France) **N Tauziat**	**6**	**6**
4	(Japan) N Kijimuta (Japan) N Miyagi	2	2
3	(Russia) E Likhovtseva (Japan) A Sugiyama	4	1
2	(Indonesia) **Y Basuki** (Netherlands) **C Vis**	**6**	**6**

Final
1	(France) **Alexandra Fusai** (France) **Nathalie Tauziat**	**6**	**6**
2	(Indonesia) Yayuk Basuki (Netherlands) Caroline Vis	4	3
