= 1997 Internationaux de Strasbourg =

- Date: 19–24 May
- Edition: 11th
- Category: Tier III
- Draw: 30S / 16D
- Prize money: $250,000
- Surface: Clay
- Location: Strasbourg, France

Champions

Singles
- (Germany) Steffi Graf

Doubles
- (Czech Republic) Helena Suková / (Belarus) Natasha Zvereva
| ← 1996 · | Internationaux de Strasbourg | · 1998 → |

The 1997 Internationaux de Strasbourg was a women's tennis tournament played on outdoor clay courts in Strasbourg, France that was part of Tier III of the 1997 WTA Tour. It was the eleventh edition of the tournament and was held from 19 May until 24 May 1997. First-seeded Steffi Graf, who competed on a wildcard, won the singles title.

== Finals ==
=== Singles ===
(Germany) Steffi Graf defeated (Croatia) Mirjana Lučić 6–2, 7–5

- It was Graf's only singles title of the year and the 103rd of her career.

=== Doubles ===
(Czech Republic) Helena Suková / (Belarus) Natasha Zvereva defeated (Russia) Elena Likhovtseva / (Japan) Ai Sugiyama 6–1, 6–1

- It was Suková's 1st title of the year and the 80th of her career. It was Zvereva's 1st doubles title of the year and the 67th of her career.
