= 2016 Internationaux de Strasbourg – Singles =

Singles
- 2016 Internationaux de Strasbourg

Final
- Champion: (France) Caroline Garcia
- Runner-up: (Croatia) Mirjana Lučić-Baroni
- Score: 6–4, 6–1

Details
- Seeds: 8

Events
Singles	Doubles
← 2015 ·	Internationaux de Strasbourg	· 2017 →

Samantha Stosur was the defending champion, but withdrew before her quarterfinal match due to a left wrist injury.

Caroline Garcia won the title, defeating Mirjana Lučić-Baroni in the final 6–4, 6–1.

== Seeds ==
1. (Italy) Sara Errani (first round)
2. (United States) Sloane Stephens (second round)
3. (Australia) Samantha Stosur (quarterfinals, withdrew due to a wrist injury)
4. (France) Kristina Mladenovic (semifinals)
5. (Romania) Monica Niculescu (withdrew)
6. (Italy) Camila Giorgi (withdrew)
7. (Russia) Elena Vesnina (quarterfinals)
8. (Hungary) Tímea Babos (second round)
9. (France) Alizé Cornet (first round)
10. (France) Caroline Garcia (champion)

== Draw ==
Key

- Q = Qualifier
- WC = Wild card
- LL = Lucky loser
- Alt = Alternate
- ITF = ITF entry
- PR = Protected ranking
- SR = Special ranking
- SE = Special exempt
- JE = Junior exempt
- JR = Junior Accelerator Programme entrant
- CO = College Accelerator Programme entrant
- NG = Next Gen Accelerator Program entrant
- w/o = Walkover
- r = Retired
- d = Defaulted

=== Finals ===
Semifinals
LL	(France) Virginie Razzano	7^{7}	4	5
10	(France) Caroline Garcia	6^{3}	6	7
4/WC	(France) Kristina Mladenovic	1	1
Q	(Croatia) Mirjana Lučić-Baroni	6	6

Final
10	(France) Caroline Garcia	6	6
Q	(Croatia) Mirjana Lučić-Baroni	4	1

=== Top half ===
First round
1/WC	(Italy) S Errani	6	3	1
(Puerto Rico) M Puig	4	6	6
(Kazakhstan) Y Shvedova	3	3
LL	(France) V Razzano	6	6
(United Kingdom) H Watson	3	6	1
(Ukraine) K Bondarenko	6	0	6
(China) S Zheng	5	6	6^{5}
7	(Russia) E Vesnina	7	2	7^{7}
3	(Australia) S Stosur	6	7
Q	(United States) L Davis	3	5
(Chinese Taipei) S-w Hsieh	6	6
Q	(China) Y Xu	3	1
(Japan) K Nara	6	5	1
Q	(Switzerland) JB Teichmann	2	7	6
(Belgium) K Flipkens	1	2
10	(France) C Garcia	6	6

Second round
(Puerto Rico) M Puig	6^{5}	6	2^{r}
LL	(France) V Razzano	7^{7}	2	3
(Ukraine) K Bondarenko	4	5
7	(Russia) E Vesnina	6	7
3	(Australia) S Stosur	6	7^{7}
(Chinese Taipei) S-w Hsieh	3	6^{3}
Q	(Switzerland) JB Teichmann	6^{5}	3
10	(France) C Garcia	7^{7}	6

Quarterfinals
LL	(France) V Razzano	6	3	6
7	(Russia) E Vesnina	1	6	1
3	(Australia) S Stosur
10	(France) C Garcia	w/o

Semifinals
LL	(France) V Razzano	7^{7}	4	5
10	(France) C Garcia	6^{3}	6	7

=== Bottom half ===
First round
9	(France) A Cornet	6	2	4
Q	(Russia) A Kudryavtseva	1	6	6
LL	(United States) S Rogers	6	4	4
(Kazakhstan) Z Diyas	3	6	6
Q	(France) A Lim	0	5
(United States) A Riske	6	7
(United States) M Brengle	4	6	5
4/WC	(France) K Mladenovic	6	2	7
8	(Hungary) T Babos	6	6
(Belarus) O Govortsova	4	1
(China) Q Wang	2	6	1
Q	(Croatia) M Lučić-Baroni	6	2	6
WC	(France) P Parmentier	7^{7}	6
(China) S Zhang	6^{3}	1
(Croatia) D Vekić	7	2	2
2	(United States) S Stephens	5	6	6

Second round
Q	(Russia) A Kudryavtseva	4	6	7^{7}
(Kazakhstan) Z Diyas	6	4	6^{4}
(United States) A Riske	6	4	6^{5}
4/WC	(France) K Mladenovic	4	6	7^{7}
8	(Hungary) T Babos	1	4
Q	(Croatia) M Lučić-Baroni	6	6
WC	(France) P Parmentier	6	1	6
2	(United States) S Stephens	3	6	4

Quarterfinals
Q	(Russia) A Kudryavtseva	4	2
4/WC	(France) K Mladenovic	6	6
Q	(Croatia) M Lučić-Baroni	6	6
WC	(France) P Parmentier	0	1

Semifinals
4/WC	(France) K Mladenovic	1	1
Q	(Croatia) M Lučić-Baroni	6	6

== Qualifying ==
=== Seeds ===
1. (Croatia) Mirjana Lučić-Baroni (qualified)
2. (United States) Shelby Rogers (qualifying competition, lucky loser)
3. (United States) Lauren Davis (qualified)
4. (China) Zhang Kailin (qualifying competition)
5. (China) Wang Yafan (qualifying competition)
6. (France) Océane Dodin (first round)
7. (France) Amandine Hesse (qualifying competition)
8. (France) Alizé Lim (qualified)
9. (China) Zhang Yuxuan (first round)
10. (Russia) Alla Kudryavtseva (qualified)
11. (France) Virginie Razzano (qualifying competition, lucky loser)
12. (Luxembourg) Mandy Minella (first round)

=== Qualifiers ===
1. (Croatia) Mirjana Lučić-Baroni
2. (Russia) Alla Kudryavtseva
3. (United States) Lauren Davis
4. (France) Alizé Lim
5. (China) Xu Yifan
6. (Switzerland) Jil Belen Teichmann

=== Lucky losers ===
1. (United States) Shelby Rogers
2. (France) Virginie Razzano

=== Draw ===
==== First qualifier ====
First round
1	(Croatia) Mirjana Lučić-Baroni	2	6	6
(Ukraine) Lyudmyla Kichenok	6	2	4
(Ukraine) Olga Savchuk	4	3
11	(France) Virginie Razzano	6	6

Qualifying competition
1	(Croatia) Mirjana Lučić-Baroni	6	6
11	(France) Virginie Razzano	1	2

==== Second qualifier ====
First round
2	(United States) Shelby Rogers	6	6
WC	(France) Lou Brouleau	1	0
WC	(France) Harmony Tan	4	2
10	(Russia) Alla Kudryavtseva	6	6

Qualifying competition
2	(United States) Shelby Rogers	6	3	4
10	(Russia) Alla Kudryavtseva	4	6	6

==== Third qualifier ====
First round
3	(United States) Lauren Davis	6	6
(Argentina) María Irigoyen	0	3
(Ukraine) Nadiia Kichenok	3	3
7	(France) Amandine Hesse	6	6

Qualifying competition
3	(United States) Lauren Davis	7^{7}	6
7	(France) Amandine Hesse	6^{1}	2

==== Fourth qualifier ====
First round
4	(China) Zhang Kailin	6	6
WC	(France) Sandra Bozinovic	4	3
(France) Chloé Paquet	4	6	4
8	(France) Alizé Lim	6	3	6

Qualifying competition
4	(China) Zhang Kailin	1	4
8	(France) Alizé Lim	6	6

==== Fifth qualifier ====
First round
5	(China) Wang Yafan	6	6
WC	(France) Tessah Andrianjafitrimo	4	4
(China) Xu Yifan	7	6
9	(China) Zhang Yuxuan	5	2

Qualifying competition
5	(China) Wang Yafan	1	4
(China) Xu Yifan	6	6

==== Sixth qualifier ====
First round
6	(France) Océane Dodin	6	2	5
(France) Irina Ramialison	2	6	7
Alt	(Switzerland) Jil Belen Teichmann	7	6
12	(Luxembourg) Mandy Minella	5	4

Qualifying competition
(France) Irina Ramialison	3	0
Alt	(Switzerland) Jil Belen Teichmann	6	6
