= 1996 Internationaux de Strasbourg – Singles =

Singles
- 1996 Internationaux de Strasbourg
- 1995 Champion: (United States) Lindsay Davenport

Final
- Champion: (United States) Lindsay Davenport
- Runner-up: (Austria) Barbara Paulus
- Score: 6–3, 7–6

Details
- Draw: 32
- Seeds: 8

Events
Singles	Doubles
← 1995 ·	Internationaux de Strasbourg	· 1997 →

Third-seeded Lindsay Davenport was the defending champion and won in the final 6–3, 7–6 against Barbara Paulus.

== Seeds ==
A champion seed is indicated in bold text while text in italics indicates the round in which that seed was eliminated.

1. (Germany) Anke Huber (quarterfinals)
2. (Japan) Kimiko Date (first round)
3. (United States) **Lindsay Davenport (champion)**
4. (United States) Mary Joe Fernández (second round)
5. (Austria) Barbara Paulus (final)
6. (France) Nathalie Tauziat (quarterfinals)
7. (Austria) Judith Wiesner (semifinals)
8. (France) Sandrine Testud (first round)

== Draw ==
=== Key ===
- Q = Qualifier
- WC = Wild card
- LL = Lucky loser
- Alt = Alternate
- ITF = ITF entry
- PR = Protected ranking
- SR = Special ranking
- SE = Special exempt
- JE = Junior exempt
- JR = Junior Accelerator Programme entrant
- CO = College Accelerator Programme entrant
- NG = Next Gen Accelerator Program entrant
- w/o = Walkover
- r = Retired
- d = Defaulted

First round
1	(Germany) **A Huber**	**6**	5	**6**
(Japan) M Endo	2	**7**	1
(Germany) **K Kschwendt**	**6**	**6**
(Australia) N Bradtke	2	1
(Japan) K Nagatsuka	**6**	5	3
(Chinese Taipei) **S-T Wang**	2	**7**	**6**
(Slovakia) R Zrubáková	4	1
7	(Austria) **J Wiesner**	**6**	**6**
3	(United States) **L Davenport**	**6**	**6**
Q	(Germany) S Meier	1	1
Q	(France) **L Ghirardi**	**6**	4	**6**
(United States) L Lee	4	**6**	2
(Japan) **N Kijimuta**	**6**	2	**6**
(United States) A Grossman	3	**6**	1
WC	(France) N Dechy	5	3
6	(France) **N Tauziat**	**7**	**6**
5	(Austria) **B Paulus**	**6**	**6**
(Poland) M Grzybowska	2	2
(Japan) Y Kamio	**6**	2	6
(France) **A Fusai**	3	**6**	**7**
WC	(France) **A D-Balleret**	**6**	**6**
(United States) J Watanabe	1	2
(Sweden) Å Carlsson	2	0
4	(United States) **M J Fernández**	**6**	**6**
8	(France) S Testud	2	3
(Slovakia) **K Studeníková**	**6**	**6**
Q	(Germany) **A Glass**	**6**	**6**
(United States) M Werdel-Witmeyer	2	2
(United States) T Whitlinger-Jones	4	3
(Belgium) **L Courtois**	**6**	**6**
Q	(United States) **A Miller**	**6**	**6**
2	(Japan) K Date	0	4

Second round
1	(Germany) **A Huber**	4	**6**	**6**
(Germany) K Kschwendt	**6**	3	2
(Chinese Taipei) S-T Wang	2	2
7	(Austria) **J Wiesner**	**6**	**6**
3	(United States) **L Davenport**	**6**	**7**
Q	(France) L Ghirardi	1	5
(Japan) N Kijimuta	3	2
6	(France) **N Tauziat**	**6**	**6**
5	(Austria) **B Paulus**	**6**	**6**
(France) A Fusai	4	3
WC	(France) **A D-Balleret**	**3**
4	(United States) M J Fernández	4	r
(Slovakia) **K Studeníková**	**6**	**6**
Q	(Germany) A Glass	4	0
(Belgium) L Courtois	2	4
Q	(United States) **A Miller**	**6**	**6**

Quarterfinals
1	(Germany) A Huber	6	1
7	(Austria) **J Wiesner**	**7**	**6**
3	(United States) **L Davenport**	**6**	**6**
6	(France) N Tauziat	1	4
5	(Austria) **B Paulus**	**6**	**6**
WC	(France) A D-Balleret	2	2
(Slovakia) **K Studeníková**	**7**	**6**
Q	(United States) A Miller	6	3

Semifinals
7	(Austria) J Wiesner	2	3
3	(United States) **L Davenport**	**6**	**6**
5	(Austria) **B Paulus**	**6**	**6**
(Slovakia) K Studeníková	3	3

Final
3	(United States) **Lindsay Davenport**	**6**	**7**
5	(Austria) Barbara Paulus	3	6
