= 2016 Internationaux de Strasbourg =

- Date: 15 – 21 May
- Edition: 30th
- Category: WTA International tournaments
- Draw: 32S / 16D
- Prize money: $250,000
- Surface: Clay
- Location: Strasbourg, France
- Venue: Tennis Club de Strasbourg

Champions

Singles
- (France) Caroline Garcia

Doubles
- (Spain) Anabel Medina Garrigues / (Spain) Arantxa Parra Santonja
- Internationaux de Strasbourg

The 2016 Internationaux de Strasbourg was a professional tennis tournament played on clay courts. It was the 30th edition of the tournament and part of the International-level tournament category of the 2016 WTA Tour. It took place in Strasbourg, France, on 15–21 May 2015.

== Points and prize money ==
=== Point distribution ===
Event	W	F	SF	QF	Round of 16	Round of 32	Q	Q2	Q1
Women's singles	280	180	110	60	30	1	18	12	1
Women's doubles	280	180	110	60	1	—N/a	—N/a	—N/a	—N/a

=== Prize money ===
Event	W	F	SF	QF	Round of 16	Round of 32	Q2	Q1
Women's singles	€34,677	€17,258	€9,274	€4,980	€2,742	€1,694	€823	€484
Women's doubles	€9,919	€5,161	€2,770	€1,468	€774	—N/a	—N/a	—N/a

== Singles main draw entrants ==
=== Seeds ===
Country	Player	Rank^{1}	Seed
ITA	Sara Errani	18	1
USA	Sloane Stephens	21	2
AUS	Samantha Stosur	22	3
FRA	Kristina Mladenovic	28	4
~~ROU~~	~~Monica Niculescu~~	~~34~~	~~5~~
~~ITA~~	~~Camila Giorgi~~	~~43~~	~~6~~
RUS	Elena Vesnina	47	7
HUN	Tímea Babos	48	8
FRA	Alizé Cornet	49	9
FRA	Caroline Garcia	53	10

- ^{1} Rankings as of May 9, 2016.

=== Other entrants ===
The following players received wildcards into the singles main draw:

- (Italy) Sara Errani
- (France) Kristina Mladenovic
- (France) Pauline Parmentier

The following players received entry from the qualifying draw:

- (United States) Lauren Davis
- (Russia) Alla Kudryavtseva
- (France) Alizé Lim
- (Croatia) Mirjana Lučić-Baroni
- (Switzerland) Jil Belen Teichmann
- (China) Xu Yifan

The following player received entry as lucky losers:

- (France) Virginie Razzano
- (United States) Shelby Rogers

=== Withdrawals ===
Before the tournament

- (Australia) Daria Gavrilova → replaced by (Belarus) Olga Govortsova
- (Italy) Camila Giorgi → replaced by (United States) Shelby Rogers
- (Montenegro) Danka Kovinić → replaced by (Japan) Kurumi Nara
- (Romania) Monica Niculescu → replaced by (France) Virginie Razzano
- (Slovakia) Magdaléna Rybáriková → replaced by (Russia) Elena Vesnina
- (Slovakia) Anna Karolína Schmiedlová → replaced by (Croatia) Donna Vekić
- (Belgium) Yanina Wickmayer → replaced by (Kazakhstan) Zarina Diyas
- (Denmark) Caroline Wozniacki → replaced by (Chinese Taipei) Hsieh Su-wei

During the tournament

- (Australia) Samantha Stosur (left wrist injury)

== Doubles main draw entrants ==
=== Seeds ===
Country	Player	Country	Player	Rank^{1}	Seed
ESP	Anabel Medina Garrigues	ESP	Arantxa Parra Santonja	59	1
TPE	Chuang Chia-jung	CRO	Darija Jurak	81	2
ARG	María Irigoyen	CHN	Liang Chen	92	3
~~UKR~~	~~Kateryna Bondarenko~~	~~UKR~~	~~Olga Savchuk~~	~~100~~	~~4~~

- ^{1} Rankings as of May 9, 2016.

=== Other entrants ===
The following pair received entry as alternates:

- (Bosnia and Herzegovina) Ema Burgić Bucko / (France) Victoria Muntean

=== Withdrawals ===
Before the tournament

- (Ukraine) Kateryna Bondarenko (viral illness)

== Champions ==
=== Singles ===
- (France) Caroline Garcia def. (Croatia) Mirjana Lučić-Baroni, 6–4, 6–1

=== Doubles ===
- (Spain) Anabel Medina Garrigues / (Spain) Arantxa Parra Santonja def. (Argentina) María Irigoyen / (China) Liang Chen, 6–2, 6–0
