= 2025 Internationaux de Strasbourg =

- Date: 18–24 May
- Edition: 39th
- Category: WTA 500
- Draw: 28S / 16D
- Surface: Clay
- Location: Strasbourg, France
- Venue: Tennis Club de Strasbourg

Champions

Singles
- (Kazakhstan) Elena Rybakina

Doubles
- (Hungary) Tímea Babos / (Brazil) Luisa Stefani
← 2024 ·	Internationaux de Strasbourg	· 2026 →

The 2025 Internationaux de Strasbourg was a women's professional tennis tournament played on outdoor clay courts in Strasbourg, France. It was the 39th edition of the tournament and part of the WTA 500 tournaments of the 2025 WTA Tour. It took place at the Tennis Club de Strasbourg between 18 and 24 May 2025.

== Finals ==
=== Singles ===
- (Kazakhstan) Elena Rybakina def. Liudmila Samsonova 6–1, 6–7^{(2–7)}, 6–1

=== Doubles ===
- (Hungary) Tímea Babos / (Brazil) Luisa Stefani def. (China) Guo Hanyu / (United States) Nicole Melichar-Martinez, 6–3, 6–7^{(3–7)}, [10–7]

== Singles main-draw entrants ==
=== Seeds ===
Country	Player	Rank^{1}	Seed
USA	Jessica Pegula	4	1
USA	Emma Navarro	9	2
ESP	Paula Badosa	10	3
KAZ	Elena Rybakina	12	4
~~UKR~~	~~Elina Svitolina~~	~~14~~	~~5~~
AUS	Daria Kasatkina	15	6
CZE	Barbora Krejčíková	16	7
	Liudmila Samsonova	21	8
BRA	Beatriz Haddad Maia	22	9

- Rankings are as of 5 May 2025.

=== Other entrants ===
The following players received wildcards into the singles main draw:

- (France) Alizé Cornet
- (France) Diane Parry
- (United States) Jessica Pegula
- (United Kingdom) Emma Raducanu

The following players received entry from the qualifying draw:

- Anna Blinkova
- (United States) Caroline Dolehide
- (United States) McCartney Kessler
- (Germany) Eva Lys

The following player received entry as a lucky loser:

- (Czech Republic) Marie Bouzková

=== Withdrawals ===
- Ekaterina Alexandrova → replaced by (China) Wang Xinyu
- (Serbia) Olga Danilović → replaced by (Slovakia) Rebecca Šramková
- (Ukraine) Elina Svitolina → replaced by (Czech Republic) Marie Bouzková

== Doubles main-draw entrants ==
=== Seeds ===
Country	Player	Country	Player	Rank^{1}	Seed
CAN	Gabriela Dabrowski	NZL	Erin Routliffe	8	1
USA	Desirae Krawczyk	AUS	Ellen Perez	33	2
UKR	Lyudmyla Kichenok	UKR	Nadiia Kichenok	58	3
CHN	Jiang Xinyu	TPE	Wu Fang-hsien	59	4

- ^{1} Rankings as of 5 May 2025.

=== Other entrants ===
The following pair received wildcards into the doubles main draw:

- (France) Myrtille Georges / (Germany) Tatjana Maria
