= 2025 Internationaux de Strasbourg – Singles =

Singles
- 2025 Internationaux de Strasbourg

Final
- Champion: (Kazakhstan) Elena Rybakina
- Runner-up: Liudmila Samsonova
- Score: 6–1, 6–7^{(2–7)}, 6–1

Details
- Draw: 28 (4 Q / 3 WC )
- Seeds: 8

Events
Singles	Doubles
← 2024 ·	Internationaux de Strasbourg	· 2026 →

Elena Rybakina defeated Liudmila Samsonova in the final, 6–1, 6–7^{(2–7)}, 6–1 to win the singles tennis title at the 2025 Internationaux de Strasbourg. It was her ninth career WTA Tour title.

Madison Keys was the reigning champion, but did not participate this year.

== Seeds ==
The top four seeds receive a bye into the second round.

1. (United States) Jessica Pegula (second round)
2. (United States) Emma Navarro (quarterfinals)
3. (Spain) Paula Badosa (quarterfinals)
4. (Kazakhstan) Elena Rybakina (champion)
5. (Ukraine) Elina Svitolina (withdrew)
6. (Australia) Daria Kasatkina (first round)
7. (Czech Republic) Barbora Krejčíková (first round)
8. Liudmila Samsonova (final)
9. (Brazil) Beatriz Haddad Maia (semifinals)

== Draw ==
=== Key ===
- Q = Qualifier
- WC = Wild card
- LL = Lucky loser
- Alt = Alternate
- ITF = ITF entry
- PR = Protected ranking
- SR = Special ranking
- SE = Special exempt
- JE = Junior exempt
- JR = Junior Accelerator Programme entrant
- CO = College Accelerator Programme entrant
- NG = Next Gen Accelerator Program entrant
- w/o = Walkover
- r = Retired
- d = Defaulted

=== Finals ===
Semifinals
(United States) Danielle Collins	4	2
8	Liudmila Samsonova	6	6
4	(Kazakhstan) Elena Rybakina	7^{9}	1	6
9	(Brazil) Beatriz Haddad Maia	6^{7}	6	2

Final
8	Liudmila Samsonova	1	7^{7}	1
4	(Kazakhstan) Elena Rybakina	6	6^{2}	6

=== Top half ===
First round
A Kalinskaya	6	4	6
Q	(United States) C Dolehide	2	6	3
(United States) D Collins	6	1	6
(United States) S Kenin	1	6	2
WC	(United Kingdom) E Raducanu	6	6
6	(Australia) D Kasatkina	1	3
WC	(France) A Cornet	2	1
LL	(Czech Republic) M Bouzková	6	6
WC	(France) D Parry	7	7^{7}
(Canada) L Fernandez	5	6^{3}
(Czech Republic) L Nosková	1	5
8	L Samsonova	6	7

Second round
1/WC	(United States) J Pegula	6	4	2
A Kalinskaya	4	6	6
(United States) D Collins	4	6	6
WC	(United Kingdom) E Raducanu	6	1	3
3	(Spain) P Badosa	3
LL	(Czech Republic) M Bouzková	3^{r}
WC	(France) D Parry	4	4
8	L Samsonova	6	6

Quarterfinals
A Kalinskaya
(United States) D Collins	w/o
3	(Spain) P Badosa	4	6	4
8	L Samsonova	6	3	6

Semifinals
(United States) D Collins	4	2
8	L Samsonova	6	6

=== Bottom half ===
First round
7	(Czech Republic) B Krejčíková	3	3
(Poland) M Linette	6	6
(Kazakhstan) Y Putintseva	0	4
(Slovakia) R Šramková	6	6
(China) Xin Wang	6	7
Q	(Germany) E Lys	4	5
9	(Brazil) B Haddad Maia	3	6	7
(Denmark) C Tauson	6	4	5
Q	(United States) M Kessler	4	5
(United States) A Krueger	6	7
(Poland) M Fręch	3	5
Q	A Blinkova	6	7

Second round
(Poland) M Linette	6	6
(Slovakia) R Šramková	4	3
(China) Xin Wang	1	3
4	(Kazakhstan) E Rybakina	6	6
9	(Brazil) B Haddad Maia	7^{7}	6
(United States) A Krueger	6^{3}	3
Q	A Blinkova	4	1
2	(United States) E Navarro	6	6

Quarterfinals
(Poland) M Linette	5	3
4	(Kazakhstan) E Rybakina	7	6
9	(Brazil) B Haddad Maia	3	7^{7}	6
2	(United States) E Navarro	6	6^{3}	2

Semifinals
4	(Kazakhstan) E Rybakina	7^{9}	1	6
9	(Brazil) B Haddad Maia	6^{7}	6	2

== Qualifying ==
=== Seeds ===
1. (United States) McCartney Kessler (qualified)
2. (Czech Republic) Marie Bouzková (qualifying competition, lucky loser)
3. (Germany) Eva Lys (qualified)
4. Anna Blinkova (qualified)
5. (Mexico) Renata Zarazúa (qualifying competition)
6. (Netherlands) Suzan Lamens (first round)
7. (United States) Caroline Dolehide (qualified)
8. (United States) Bernarda Pera (qualifying competition)

=== Qualifiers ===
1. (United States) McCartney Kessler
2. (United States) Caroline Dolehide
3. (Germany) Eva Lys
4. Anna Blinkova

=== Lucky loser ===
1. (Czech Republic) Marie Bouzková

=== Qualifying draw ===
==== First qualifier ====
First round
1	(United States) McCartney Kessler	6	5	6
(United Kingdom) Jodie Burrage	4	7	2
(Spain) Cristina Bucșa	7	3	3
5	(Mexico) Renata Zarazúa	5	6	6

Qualifying competition
1	(United States) McCartney Kessler	7^{7}	6
5	(Mexico) Renata Zarazúa	6^{3}	3

==== Second qualifier ====
First round
2	(Czech Republic) Marie Bouzková	6	6
(Germany) Tatjana Maria	2	2
WC	(France) Sarah Iliev	3	4
7	(United States) Caroline Dolehide	6	6

Qualifying competition
2	(Czech Republic) Marie Bouzková	4	0
7	(United States) Caroline Dolehide	6	6

==== Third qualifier ====
First round
3	(Germany) Eva Lys	6	6
Alt	(Serbia) Aleksandra Krunić	4	0
(Ukraine) Valeriya Strakhova	3	3
8	(United States) Bernarda Pera	6	6

Qualifying competition
3	(Germany) Eva Lys	7^{7}	6
8	(United States) Bernarda Pera	6^{3}	1

==== Fourth qualifier ====
First round
4	Anna Blinkova	1	6	6
WC	(Estonia) Elena Malõgina	6	4	1
(France) Elsa Jacquemot	7	7
6	(Netherlands) Suzan Lamens	5	5

Qualifying competition
4	Anna Blinkova	6	6
(France) Elsa Jacquemot	1	3
