= 1998 Internationaux de Strasbourg =

- Date: 18–24 May
- Edition: 12th
- Category: Tier III
- Draw: 30S / 16D
- Prize money: $200,000
- Surface: Clay / outdoor
- Location: Strasbourg, France

Champions

Singles
- (Romania) Irina Spîrlea

Doubles
- (France) Alexandra Fusai / (France) Nathalie Tauziat
← 1997 ·	Internationaux de Strasbourg	· 1999 →

The 1998 Internationaux de Strasbourg was a women's tennis tournament played on outdoor clay courts in Strasbourg, France that was part of Tier III of the 1998 WTA Tour. It was the 12th edition of the tournament and was held from 18 May until 24 May 1998. Second-seeded Irina Spîrlea won the singles title.

== Finals ==
=== Singles ===
(Romania) Irina Spîrlea defeated (France) Julie Halard-Decugis 7–6^{(7–5)}, 6–3

- It was Spîrlea's only title of the year and the 7th of her career.

=== Doubles ===
(France) Alexandra Fusai / (France) Nathalie Tauziat defeated (Indonesia) Yayuk Basuki / (Netherlands) Caroline Vis 6–4, 6–3

- It was Fusai's 2nd title of the year and the 6th of her career. It was Tauziat's 2nd title of the year and the 20th of her career.
