= 1996 Internationaux de Strasbourg – Doubles =

Doubles
- 1996 Internationaux de Strasbourg
- 1995 Champions: (United States) Lindsay Davenport (United States) Mary Joe Fernández

Final
- Champions: (Indonesia) Yayuk Basuki (Australia) Nicole Bradtke
- Runners-up: (United States) Marianne Werdel-Witmeyer (United States) Tami Whitlinger-Jones
- Score: 5–7, 6–4, 6–4

Details
- Draw: 16
- Seeds: 4

Events
Singles	Doubles
← 1995 ·	Internationaux de Strasbourg	· 1997 →

Lindsay Davenport and Mary Joe Fernández were the defending champions but lost in the quarterfinals to Marianne Werdel-Witmeyer and Tami Whitlinger-Jones.

Yayuk Basuki and Nicole Bradtke won in the final 5–7, 6–4, 6–4 against Werdel-Witmeyer and Whitlinger-Jones.

== Seeds ==
Champion seeds are indicated in bold text while text in italics indicates the round in which those seeds were eliminated.

1. (United States) Lindsay Davenport / (United States) Mary Joe Fernández (quarterfinals)
2. (Indonesia) **Yayuk Basuki** / (Australia) **Nicole Bradtke (champions)**
3. (France) Alexia Dechaume-Balleret / (France) Sandrine Testud (semifinals)
4. (Argentina) Laura Montalvo / (Argentina) Paola Suárez (semifinals)

== Draw ==
=== Key ===
- Q = Qualifier
- WC = Wild card
- LL = Lucky loser
- Alt = Alternate
- ITF = ITF entry
- PR = Protected ranking
- SR = Special ranking
- SE = Special exempt
- JE = Junior exempt
- JR = Junior Accelerator Programme entrant
- CO = College Accelerator Programme entrant
- NG = Next Gen Accelerator Program entrant
- w/o = Walkover
- r = Retired
- d = Defaulted

First round
1	(United States) **L Davenport** (United States) **M J Fernández**	**6**	**6**
(United States) A Lettiere (United States) J Watanabe	1	0
(United States) **M Werdel-Witmeyer** (United States) **T Whitlinger-Jones**	**7**	**6**
(United States) L Lee (United States) S McCarthy	5	2
3	(France) **A Dechaume-Balleret** (France) **S Testud**	2	**7**	**6**
(Sweden) Å Carlsson (Germany) K Kschwendt	**6**	5	4
Q	(Japan) M Endo (Japan) Y Kamio	6	2
(Australia) **C Barclay** (France) **A Fusai**	**7**	**6**
(Poland) M Grzybowska (Germany) C Schneider	4	**6**	3
(Argentina) **B Fulco-Villella** (Japan) **K Nagatsuka**	**6**	2	**6**
(United States) A Grossman (Slovakia) R Zrubáková	4	**6**	2
4	(Argentina) **L Montalvo** (Argentina) **P Suárez**	**6**	4	**6**
WC	(France) **A Cocheteux** (France) **N Dechy**	**7**	**6**
(France) L Ghirardi (France) S Pitkowski	6	1
(Germany) K Freye (Germany) S Meier	4	3
2	(Indonesia) **Y Basuki** (Australia) **N Bradtke**	**6**	**6**

Quarterfinals
1	(United States) L Davenport (United States) M J Fernández
(United States) **M Werdel-Witmeyer** (United States) **T Whitlinger-Jones**	**w/o**
3	(France) **A Dechaume-Balleret** (France) **S Testud**	1	**6**	**6**
(Australia) C Barclay (France) A Fusai	**6**	4	2
(Argentina) B Fulco-Villella (Japan) K Nagatsuka	1	5
4	(Argentina) **L Montalvo** (Argentina) **P Suárez**	**6**	**7**
WC	(France) A Cocheteux (France) N Dechy	2	3
2	(Indonesia) **Y Basuki** (Australia) **R Simpson**	**6**	**6**

Semifinals
(United States) **M Werdel-Witmeyer** (United States) **T Whitlinger-Jones**	**7**	6	**6**
3	(France) A Dechaume-Balleret (France) S Testud	6	**7**	3
4	(Argentina) L Montalvo (Argentina) P Suárez	4	6
2	(Indonesia) **Y Basuki** (Australia) **N Bradtke**	**6**	**7**

Final
(United States) Marianne Werdel-Witmeyer (United States) Tami Whitlinger-Jones	**7**	4	4
2	(Indonesia) **Yayuk Basuki** (Australia) **Nicole Bradtke**	5	**6**	**6**
