= 2023 Internationaux de Strasbourg – Doubles =

Doubles
- 2023 Internationaux de Strasbourg

Final
- Champions: (China) Xu Yifan (China) Yang Zhaoxuan
- Runners-up: (United States) Desirae Krawczyk (Mexico) Giuliana Olmos
- Score: 6–3, 6–2

Events
Singles	Doubles
← 2022 ·	Internationaux de Strasbourg	· 2024 →

Xu Yifan and Yang Zhaoxuan defeated Desirae Krawczyk and Giuliana Olmos in the final, 6–3, 6–2 to win the doubles tennis title at the 2023 Internationaux de Strasbourg.

Nicole Melichar-Martinez and Daria Saville were the reigning champions, but Saville did not participate due to injury. Melichar-Martinez partnered with Ellen Perez, but lost in the first round to Chan Hao-ching and Latisha Chan.

== Seeds ==
1. (United States) Nicole Melichar-Martinez / (Australia) Ellen Perez (first round)
2. (United States) Desirae Krawczyk / (Mexico) Giuliana Olmos (final)
3. (Japan) Shuko Aoyama / (Japan) Ena Shibahara (quarterfinals)
4. (China) Xu Yifan / (China) Yang Zhaoxuan (champions)

== Draw ==
=== Key ===
- Q = Qualifier
- WC = Wild card
- LL = Lucky loser
- Alt = Alternate
- SE = Special exempt
- PR = Protected ranking
- ITF = ITF entry
- JE = Junior exempt
- w/o = Walkover
- r = Retired
- d = Defaulted
- SR = Special ranking

=== Draw ===
First round
1	(United States) N Melichar-Martinez (Australia) E Perez	4	6	[7]
(Chinese Taipei) H-c Chan (Chinese Taipei) L Chan	6	3	[10]
(Chinese Taipei) S-w Hsieh (China) Xin Wang	6	6
A Gabueva (Estonia) K Kanepi	4	2
4	(China) Y Xu (China) Z Yang	7^{7}	7
(Chile) A Guarachi (New Zealand) E Routliffe	6^{2}	5
(United States) S Chang (United States) A Kulikov	4	6	[10]
(Spain) C Bucșa (Poland) A Rosolska	6	3	[6]
(Czech Republic) M Kolodziejová (Slovakia) T Mihalíková	6	7^{7}
A Blinkova; V Gracheva	4	6^{1}
WC	(France) M Georges (France) J Tomera	0	1
3	(Japan) S Aoyama (Japan) E Shibahara	6	6
WC	(France) S Deppner (France) S Iliev	6	5	[6]
(Australia) O Tjandramulia (Chinese Taipei) F-h Wu	2	7	[10]
(Ukraine) N Kichenok (Belgium) K Zimmermann	2	2
2	(United States) D Krawczyk (Mexico) G Olmos	6	6

Quarterfinals
(Chinese Taipei) H-c Chan (Chinese Taipei) L Chan	6	5	[10]
(Chinese Taipei) S-w Hsieh (China) Xin Wang	4	7	[8]
4	(China) Y Xu (China) Z Yang	7^{7}	5	[10]
(United States) S Chang (United States) A Kulikov	6^{4}	7	[7]
(Czech Republic) M Kolodziejová (Slovakia) T Mihalíková	6	3	[10]
3	(Japan) S Aoyama (Japan) E Shibahara	4	6	[4]
(Australia) O Tjandramulia (Chinese Taipei) F-h Wu	1	0
2	(United States) D Krawczyk (Mexico) G Olmos	6	6

Semifinals
(Chinese Taipei) H-c Chan (Chinese Taipei) L Chan	7^{7}	0	[6]
4	(China) Y Xu (China) Z Yang	6^{5}	6	[10]
(Czech Republic) M Kolodziejová (Slovakia) T Mihalíková	4	7	[4]
2	(United States) D Krawczyk (Mexico) G Olmos	6	5	[10]

Final
4	(China) Y Xu (China) Z Yang	6	6
2	(United States) D Krawczyk (Mexico) G Olmos	3	2
