= 1999 Internationaux de Strasbourg – Doubles =

Doubles
- 1999 Internationaux de Strasbourg

Final
- Champions: (Russia) Elena Likhovtseva (Japan) Ai Sugiyama
- Runners-up: (France) Alexandra Fusai (France) Nathalie Tauziat
- Score: 2–6, 7–6^{(8–6)}, 6–1

Events
Singles	Doubles
- Internationaux de Strasbourg

The 1999 Internationaux de Strasbourg singles was the tennis singles event of the thirteenth edition of the Internationaux de Strasbourg, a WTA Tier III tournament held in Strasbourg, France and part of the European clay court season. Alexandra Fusai and Nathalie Tauziat were the defending champions, but they were defeated in the final by Elena Likhovtseva and Ai Sugiyama, 2–6, 7–6^{(8–6)}, 6–1.

== Seeds ==
1. (France) Alexandra Fusai / (France) Nathalie Tauziat (final)
2. (Russia) Elena Likhovtseva / (Japan) Ai Sugiyama (champions)
3. (Australia) Catherine Barclay / (Zimbabwe) Cara Black (quarterfinals)
4. (Sweden) Åsa Carlsson / (France) Émilie Loit (quarterfinals)

== Draw ==
Key

- Q = Qualifier
- WC = Wild card
- LL = Lucky loser
- Alt = Alternate
- ITF = ITF entry
- PR = Protected ranking
- SR = Special ranking
- SE = Special exempt
- JE = Junior exempt
- JR = Junior Accelerator Programme entrant
- CO = College Accelerator Programme entrant
- NG = Next Gen Accelerator Program entrant
- w/o = Walkover
- r = Retired
- d = Defaulted

First round
1	(France) A Fusai (France) N Tauziat	6	6
WC	(Bulgaria) M Maleeva (Netherlands) M Oremans	2	3
(Canada) S Jeyaseelan (Czech Republic) E Melicharová	7	6
(Germany) K Freye (United States) J Watanabe	5	3
4	(Sweden) Å Carlsson (France) É Loit	6	6
(Australia) A Grahame (India) N Vaidyanathan	4	2
(Germany) G Kučerová (Czech Republic) R Pelikánová	7	3	4
(Thailand) T Tanasugarn (Chinese Taipei) Wang S-t	5	6	6
(France) A Cocheteux (France) N Dechy	6	6
Q	(South Africa) J Kruger (China) Li F	1	2
3	(Australia) C Barclay (Zimbabwe) C Black	6	6
(Germany) A Barna (Austria) S Bammer	0	2
(Bulgaria) L Bacheva (France) S Schoeffel	6^{7}	6	7
(Australia) A Molik (Slovenia) T Pisnik	7^{9}	4	5
(Netherlands) K Boogert (France) A-G Sidot	6^{3}	4
2	(Russia) E Likhovtseva (Japan) A Sugiyama	7^{7}	6

Quarterfinals
1	(France) A Fusai (France) N Tauziat	6	7^{7}
(Canada) S Jeyaseelan (Czech Republic) E Melicharová	3	6^{2}
4	(Sweden) Å Carlsson (France) É Loit	5	2
(Thailand) T Tanasugarn (Chinese Taipei) Wang S-t	7	6
(France) A Cocheteux (France) N Dechy	6	6
3	(Australia) C Barclay (Zimbabwe) C Black	2	4
(Bulgaria) L Bacheva (France) S Schoeffel	6^{8}	2
2	(Russia) E Likhovtseva (Japan) A Sugiyama	7^{10}	6

Semifinals
1	(France) A Fusai (France) N Tauziat	6	6
(Thailand) T Tanasugarn (Chinese Taipei) Wang S-t	3	2
(France) A Cocheteux (France) N Dechy	3	3
2	(Russia) E Likhovtseva (Japan) A Sugiyama	6	6

Final
1	(France) A Fusai (France) N Tauziat	6	6^{6}	1
2	(Russia) E Likhovtseva (Japan) A Sugiyama	2	7^{8}	6

== Qualifying ==
Qualifying competition
1	(Argentina) María José Gaidano (Venezuela) María Vento	2
2	(South Africa) Joannette Kruger (China) Li Fang	8
