= 1999 Internationaux de Strasbourg =

- Date: 17–23 May
- Edition: 13th
- Category: Tier III
- Draw: 32S / 16D
- Prize money: $190,000
- Surface: Clay / outdoor
- Location: Strasbourg, France

Champions

Singles
- (United States) Jennifer Capriati

Doubles
- (Russia) Elena Likhovtseva / (Japan) Ai Sugiyama
← 1998 ·	Internationaux de Strasbourg	· 2000 →

The 1999 Internationaux de Strasbourg was a women's tennis tournament played on outdoor clay courts in Strasbourg, France that was part of Tier III of the 1999 WTA Tour. It was the 13th edition of the tournament, held from 17 until 23 May 1999. Unseeded Jennifer Capriati won the singles title and $27,500 first-prize money.

== Finals ==
=== Singles ===
(United States) Jennifer Capriati defeated (Russia) Elena Likhovtseva, 6–1, 6–3

- It was Capriati's 7th career title, and her first since 1993.

=== Doubles ===
(Russia) Elena Likhovtseva / (Japan) Ai Sugiyama defeated (France) Alexandra Fusai / (France) Nathalie Tauziat, 2–6, 7–6^{(8–6)}, 6–1

== Entrants ==
=== Seeds ===
- Rank on 10 May 1999.

Country	Player	Rank	Seed
FRA	Nathalie Tauziat	9	1
RUS	Elena Likhovtseva	22	2
JPN	Ai Sugiyama	27	3
FRA	Nathalie Dechy	28	4
USA	Corina Morariu	33	5
ZIM	Cara Black	34	6
USA	Lisa Raymond	38	7
FRA	Anne-Gaëlle Sidot	42	8

=== Other entrants ===
The following players received wildcards into the singles main draw:

- (France) Laurence Andretto
- (France) Stéphanie Foretz

The following players received wildcards into the doubles main draw:

- (Bulgaria) Magdalena Maleeva / (Netherlands) Miriam Oremans

The following players received entry from the singles qualifying draw:

- (Czech Republic) Adriana Gerši
- (Czech Republic) Denisa Chládková
- (Chinese Taipei) Janet Lee
- (Bulgaria) Lubomira Bacheva

The following players received entry as lucky losers:

- (United States) Jolene Watanabe

The following players received entry from the doubles qualifying draw:

- (South Africa) Joannette Kruger / (China) Li Fang
