= 2010 Internationaux de Strasbourg =

- Date: 17–22 May
- Edition: 24th
- Category: WTA International
- Draw: 32S / 16D
- Prize money: $220,000
- Surface: Clay / outdoor
- Location: Strasbourg, France
- Venue: Centre Sportif de Hautepierre

Champions

Singles
- (Russia) Maria Sharapova

Doubles
- (France) Alizé Cornet / (United States) Vania King
- Internationaux de Strasbourg

The 2010 Internationaux de Strasbourg was a tennis tournament played on an outdoor clay court. It was the 24th edition of the Internationaux de Strasbourg, and was part of the International-level tournaments of the 2010 WTA Tour. It took place at the Centre Sportif de Hautepierre in Strasbourg, France, from 17 May until 22 May 2010.

== Finals ==
=== Singles ===
(Russia) Maria Sharapova defeated (Germany) Kristina Barrois, 7–5, 6–1

=== Doubles ===
(France) Alizé Cornet / (United States) Vania King defeated (Russia) Alla Kudryavtseva / (Australia) Anastasia Rodionova, 3–6, 6–4, [10–7]

== Entrants ==
=== Seeds ===
| Player | Nationality | Ranking* | Seeding |
|---|---|---|---|
| Maria Sharapova | Russia | 12 | 1 |
| Elena Vesnina | Russia | 34 | 2 |
| Virginie Razzano | France | 47 | 3 |
| Peng Shuai | China | 50 | 4 |
| Anabel Medina Garrigues | Spain | 54 | 5 |
| Sybille Bammer | Austria | 59 | 6 |
| Anastasija Sevastova | Latvia | 60 | 7 |
| Elena Baltacha | United Kingdom | 62 | 8 |

- Seedings are based on the rankings of May 10, 2010.

=== Other entrants ===
The following players received wildcards into the main draw:

- (Russia) Maria Sharapova
- (France) Pauline Parmentier
- (France) Virginie Razzano
- (France) Kristina Mladenovic

The following players received entry from the qualifying draw:

- (Bulgaria) Dia Evtimova
- (Italy) Maria Elena Camerin
- (Colombia) Mariana Duque Mariño
- (Romania) Sorana Cîrstea

The following player received the lucky loser spot:

- (France) Stéphanie Foretz
