= 1996 Internationaux de Strasbourg =

- Date: 20–25 May
- Edition: 10th
- Category: Tier III
- Draw: 32S / 16D
- Prize money: $164,250
- Surface: Clay / outdoor
- Location: Strasbourg, France

Champions

Singles
- (United States) Lindsay Davenport

Doubles
- (Indonesia) Yayuk Basuki / (Australia) Nicole Bradtke
← 1995 ·	Internationaux de Strasbourg	· 1997 →

The 1996 Internationaux de Strasbourg was a women's tennis tournament played on outdoor clay courts in Strasbourg, France that was part of the Tier III category of the 1996 WTA Tour. It was the tenth edition of the tournament and was held from 20 May until 25 May 1996. Third-seeded Lindsay Davenport won the singles title.

== Finals ==
=== Singles ===
(United States) Lindsay Davenport defeated (Austria) Barbara Paulus 6–3, 7–6^{(8–6)}

- It was Davenport's 1st singles title of the year and the 5th of her career.

=== Doubles ===
(Indonesia) Yayuk Basuki / (Australia) Nicole Bradtke defeated (United States) Marianne Werdel-Witmeyer / (United States) Tami Whitlinger-Jones 5–7, 6–4, 6–4

- It was Basuki's 2nd and last doubles title of the year and the 5th of her career. It was Bradtke's only doubles title of the year and the 9th and last of her career.
