= 1997 Internationaux de Strasbourg – Doubles =

Doubles
- 1997 Internationaux de Strasbourg
- 1996 Champions: (Indonesia) Yayuk Basuki (Australia) Nicole Bradtke

Final
- Champions: (Czech Republic) Helena Suková (Belarus) Natasha Zvereva
- Runners-up: (Russia) Elena Likhovtseva (Japan) Ai Sugiyama
- Score: 6–1, 6–1

Details
- Draw: 16
- Seeds: 4

Events
Singles	Doubles
← 1996 ·	Internationaux de Strasbourg	· 1998 →

Yayuk Basuki and Nicole Bradtke were the defending champions but did not compete that year.

Helena Suková and Natasha Zvereva won in the final 6–1, 6–1 against Elena Likhovtseva and Ai Sugiyama.

== Seeds ==
Champion seeds are indicated in bold text while text in italics indicates the round in which those seeds were eliminated.

1. (Czech Republic) **Helena Suková** / (Belarus) **Natasha Zvereva (champions)**
2. (France) Alexandra Fusai / (France) Nathalie Tauziat (quarterfinals)
3. (France) Alexia Dechaume-Balleret / (France) Sandrine Testud (semifinals)
4. (Argentina) Laura Montalvo / (Argentina) Paola Suárez (first round)

== Draw ==
=== Key ===
- Q = Qualifier
- WC = Wild card
- LL = Lucky loser
- Alt = Alternate
- ITF = ITF entry
- PR = Protected ranking
- SR = Special ranking
- SE = Special exempt
- JE = Junior exempt
- JR = Junior Accelerator Programme entrant
- CO = College Accelerator Programme entrant
- NG = Next Gen Accelerator Program entrant
- w/o = Walkover
- r = Retired
- d = Defaulted

First round
1	(Czech Republic) **H Suková** (Belarus) **N Zvereva**	**6**	**6**
(Federal Republic of Yugoslavia) T Ječmenica (Venezuela) M Mazzotta	3	0
(France) C Dhenin (Italy) F Perfetti	2	4
(Australia) **D Jones** (Thailand) **T Tanasugarn**	**6**	**6**
3	(France) **A Dechaume-Balleret** (France) **S Testud**	**6**	6	**6**
(Australia) S Drake-Brockman (United States) J Watanabe	2	**7**	2
(Belgium) **L Courtois** (Canada) **R Simpson**	3	**7**	**6**
(Canada) P Hy-Boulais (France) A-G Sidot	**6**	5	3
(United States) R Jensen (Chinese Taipei) S-T Wang	4	**6**	4
(Argentina) **M Díaz Oliva** (Japan) **M Endo**	**6**	4	**6**
(France) **N Dechy** (France) **L Ghirardi**	**6**	2	**6**
4	(Argentina) L Montalvo (Argentina) P Suárez	3	**6**	2
(Germany) S Meier (Czech Republic) E Melicharová	4	0
(Japan) **N Kijimuta** (Slovakia) **K Studeníková**	**6**	**6**
(Russia) **E Likhovtseva** (Japan) **A Sugiyama**	4	**6**	**6**
2	(France) A Fusai (France) N Tauziat	**6**	4	4

Quarterfinals
1	(Czech Republic) **H Suková** (Belarus) **N Zvereva**	**6**	**6**
(Australia) D Jones (Thailand) T Tanasugarn	2	1
3	(France) **A Dechaume-Balleret** (France) **S Testud**	**6**	2	**6**
(Belgium) L Courtois (Canada) R Simpson	1	**6**	2
(Argentina) M Díaz Oliva (Japan) M Endo	**6**	6	0
(France) **N Dechy** (France) **L Ghirardi**	1	**7**	**6**
(Japan) N Kijimuta (Slovakia) K Studeníková	4	3
(Russia) **E Likhovtseva** (Japan) **A Sugiyama**	**6**	**6**

Semifinals
1	(Czech Republic) **H Suková** (Belarus) **N Zvereva**	3	**6**	**6**
3	(France) A Dechaume-Balleret (France) S Testud	**6**	4	1
(France) N Dechy (France) L Ghirardi	2	2
(Russia) **E Likhovtseva** (Japan) **A Sugiyama**	**6**	**6**

Final
1	(Czech Republic) **Helena Suková** (Belarus) **Natasha Zvereva**	**6**	**6**
(Russia) Elena Likhovtseva (Japan) Ai Sugiyama	1	1
