= 1998 Internationaux de Strasbourg – Singles =

Singles
- 1998 Internationaux de Strasbourg
- 1997 Champion: (Germany) Steffi Graf

Final
- Champion: (Romania) Irina Spîrlea
- Runner-up: (France) Julie Halard-Decugis
- Score: 7–6, 6–3

Details
- Seeds: 8

Events
Singles	Doubles
← 1997 ·	Internationaux de Strasbourg	· 1999 →

Steffi Graf was the defending champion but did not compete that year.

Second-seeded Irina Spîrlea won in the final 7–6, 6–3 against Julie Halard-Decugis.

== Seeds ==
A champion seed is indicated in bold text while text in italics indicates the round in which that seed was eliminated. The top two seeds received a bye to the second round.

1. (South Africa) Amanda Coetzer (quarterfinals)
2. (Romania) **Irina Spîrlea (champion)**
3. (France) Nathalie Tauziat (quarterfinals)
4. (Japan) Ai Sugiyama (quarterfinals)
5. (Indonesia) Yayuk Basuki (first round)
6. n/a
7. n/a
8. (Slovakia) Henrieta Nagyová (quarterfinals)

== Draw ==
=== Key ===
- Q = Qualifier
- WC = Wild card
- LL = Lucky loser
- Alt = Alternate
- SE = Special exempt
- PR = Protected ranking
- ITF = ITF entry
- JE = Junior exempt
- w/o = Walkover
- r = Retired
- d = Defaulted
- SR = Special ranking

=== Final ===
Final
WC	(France) Julie Halard-Decugis	6	3
2	(Romania) **Irina Spîrlea**	**7**	**6**

=== Section 1 ===
First round
Q	(France) É Loit	3	2
(China) **F Li**	**6**	**6**
(Thailand) T Tanasugarn	4	2
WC	(France) **J Halard-Decugis**	**6**	**6**
(Italy) R Grande	**6**	3	2
Q	(France) **A Cocheteux**	2	**6**	**6**
3	(France) **N Tauziat**	**6**	**6**
(United States) A Miller	3	1
(Japan) N Sawamatsu	4	1
(Venezuela) **M Vento**	**6**	**6**
LL	(Romania) **C Cristea**	**6**	**6**
(Germany) A Glass	4	4
(Russia) **E Likhovtseva**	**6**	**7**
5	(Indonesia) Y Basuki	1	6

Second round
1	(South Africa) **A Coetzer**	**7**	**7**
(China) F Li	6	5
WC	(France) **J Halard-Decugis**	**6**	**6**
Q	(France) A Cocheteux	2	1
3	(France) **N Tauziat**	**7**	3	**7**
(Venezuela) M Vento	5	**6**	6
LL	(Romania) C Cristea	**6**	0	3
(Russia) **E Likhovtseva**	3	**6**	**6**

Quarterfinals
1	(South Africa) A Coetzer	6	2
WC	(France) **J Halard-Decugis**	**7**	**6**
3	(France) N Tauziat	4	2
(Russia) **E Likhovtseva**	**6**	**6**

Semifinals
WC	(France) **J Halard-Decugis**	**6**	**7**
(Russia) E Likhovtseva	3	6

=== Section 2 ===
First round
LL	(United States) **S Reeves**	5	**7**	**6**
(Australia) K-A Guse	**7**	5	1
WC	(France) **A Fusai**	3	**6**	**7**
Q	(Austria) M Maruska	**6**	4	6
(Belarus) **O Barabanschikova**	**6**	**7**
(Japan) M Saeki	1	5
WC	(France) N Dechy	**6**	4	3
4	(Japan) **A Sugiyama**	1	**6**	**6**
8	(Slovakia) **H Nagyová**	3	**6**	**6**
Q	(South Africa) M de Swardt	**6**	4	2
(France) **S Pitkowski**	**6**	**6**
(Chinese Taipei) S-T Wang	4	3
(France) A-G Sidot	6	**7**	3
(Czech Republic) **A Gerši**	**7**	6	**6**

Second round
LL	(United States) S Reeves	3	6
WC	(France) **A Fusai**	**6**	**7**
(Belarus) O Barabanschikova	4	**7**	2
4	(Japan) **A Sugiyama**	**6**	6	**6**
8	(Slovakia) **H Nagyová**	3	**6**	**6**
(France) S Pitkowski	**6**	2	4
(Czech Republic) A Gerši	2	1
2	(Romania) **I Spîrlea**	**6**	**6**

Quarterfinals
WC	(France) **A Fusai**	**6**	**6**
4	(Japan) A Sugiyama	2	2
8	(Slovakia) H Nagyová	4	2
2	(Romania) **I Spîrlea**	**6**	**6**

Semifinals
WC	(France) A Fusai	5	3
2	(Romania) **I Spîrlea**	**7**	**6**
