= 2023 Internationaux de Strasbourg – Singles =

Singles
- 2023 Internationaux de Strasbourg

Final
- Champion: (Ukraine) Elina Svitolina
- Runner-up: Anna Blinkova
- Score: 6–2, 6–3

Details
- Draw: 32 (2 WC)
- Seeds: 8

Events
Singles	Doubles
← 2022 ·	Internationaux de Strasbourg	· 2024 →

Elina Svitolina defeated Anna Blinkova in the final, 6–2, 6–3 to win the singles tennis title at the 2023 Internationaux de Strasbourg. It was her 17th WTA Tour singles title and her second Strasbourg title. Ranked world No. 508, Svitolina won her first title since returning from a 14-month maternity leave hiatus, and became the fourth-lowest ranked title winner in WTA history. She is the fifth wildcard in tournament history to win the title, joining defending champion Angelique Kerber, Samantha Stosur, Maria Sharapova, and Steffi Graf.

Kerber was the defending champion, but was on maternity leave after having her first child in February 2023 and did not return to compete.

== Seeds ==
1. (Poland) Magda Linette (second round)
2. (Belgium) Elise Mertens (withdrew)
3. (China) Zhang Shuai (first round)
4. (United States) Bernarda Pera (quarterfinals)
5. (Romania) Sorana Cîrstea (first round)
6. Varvara Gracheva (quarterfinals)
7. (United States) Lauren Davis (semifinals)
8. (Switzerland) Jil Teichmann (second round)

== Draw ==
=== Key ===
- Q = Qualifier
- WC = Wild card
- LL = Lucky loser
- Alt = Alternate
- SE = Special exempt
- PR = Protected ranking
- ITF = ITF entry
- JE = Junior exempt
- w/o = Walkover
- r = Retired
- d = Defaulted
- SR = Special ranking

=== Finals ===
Semifinals
7	(United States) Lauren Davis	2	2
Anna Blinkova	6	6
(France) Clara Burel	6	5	4
WC	(Ukraine) Elina Svitolina	4	7	6

Final
Anna Blinkova	2	3
WC	(Ukraine) Elina Svitolina	6	6

=== Top half ===
First round
1	(Poland) M Linette	4	6	6
(Spain) C Bucșa	6	2	2
WC	A Pavlyuchenkova	6	6
Q	A Gabueva	3	1
(Bulgaria) V Tomova	3	6	7
(France) A Cornet	6	4	5
Q	(France) S Iliev	5	0
7	(United States) L Davis	7	6
3	(China) S Zhang	0	0
(Germany) A-L Friedsam	6	6
PR	(France) A Hesse	6	0	4
A Blinkova	4	6	6
(United States) E Navarro	6	6
(Czech Republic) T Martincová	2	3
(Belgium) M Zanevska	6	3	4
8	(Switzerland) J Teichmann	4	6	6

Second round
1	(Poland) M Linette	3	2
WC	A Pavlyuchenkova	6	6
(Bulgaria) V Tomova	4	6	1
7	(United States) L Davis	6	3	6
(Germany) A-L Friedsam	4	6^{11}
A Blinkova	6	7^{13}
(United States) E Navarro	2	6	6
8	(Switzerland) J Teichmann	6	3	2

Quarterfinals
WC	A Pavlyuchenkova	6	6^{2}	0
7	(United States) L Davis	1	7^{7}	6
A Blinkova	6	6
(United States) E Navarro	4	4

Semifinals
7	(United States) L Davis	2	2
A Blinkova	6	6

=== Bottom half ===
First round
5	(Romania) S Cîrstea	6^{5}	5
(France) C Burel	7^{7}	7
(China) Xin Wang	3	2
(Estonia) K Kanepi	6	6
(Australia) K Birrell	6	6
Q	(Estonia) E Malõgina	2	3
LL	(United States) S Chang	4	6	1
4	(United States) B Pera	6	4	6
6	V Gracheva	6	3	7^{7}
LL	(China) Z Bai	3	6	6^{3}
(France) O Dodin	6	1	4
(France) S Janicijevic	2	6	6
WC	(Ukraine) E Svitolina	6	7^{7}
(United States) L Chirico	4	6^{1}
Q	(Chinese Taipei) S-w Hsieh	6^{2}	6	1
LL	(New Zealand) E Routliffe	7^{7}	1	6

Second round
(France) C Burel	7	7^{7}
(Estonia) K Kanepi	5	6^{0}
(Australia) K Birrell	4	4
4	(United States) B Pera	6	6
6	V Gracheva	6	6
(France) S Janicijevic	2	1
WC	(Ukraine) E Svitolina	w/o
LL	(New Zealand) E Routliffe

Quarterfinals
(France) C Burel	6	3	6
4	(United States) B Pera	2	6	4
6	V Gracheva	3	4
WC	(Ukraine) E Svitolina	6	6

Semifinals
(France) C Burel	6	5	3
WC	(Ukraine) E Svitolina	4	7	6

== Qualifying ==
=== Seeds ===
1. (France) Séléna Janicijevic (moved to main draw)
2. (China) Bai Zhuoxuan (qualifying competition, lucky loser)
3. (United States) Louisa Chirico (moved to main draw)
4. (United States) Sophie Chang (qualifying competition, lucky loser)
5. (Czech Republic) Jesika Malečková (first round)
6. (Estonia) Elena Malõgina (qualified)
7. (Australia) Ellen Perez (first round)
8. (Australia) Olivia Tjandramulia (first round)

=== Qualifiers ===
1. Angelina Gabueva
2. (France) Sarah Iliev
3. (Estonia) Elena Malõgina
4. (Chinese Taipei) Hsieh Su-wei

=== Lucky losers ===
1. (China) Bai Zhuoxuan
2. (United States) Sophie Chang
3. (New Zealand) Erin Routliffe

=== Qualifying draw ===
==== First qualifier ====
First round
Alt	Angelina Gabueva	6	6
(Chinese Taipei) Chan Hao-ching	4	4
(New Zealand) Erin Routliffe	6	6
8	(Australia) Olivia Tjandramulia	3	2

Qualifying competition
Alt	Angelina Gabueva	6	6
(New Zealand) Erin Routliffe	1	3

==== Second qualifier ====
First round
2	(China) Bai Zhuoxuan	6	6
(Japan) Ena Shibahara	2	2
WC	(France) Sarah Iliev	5	6	6
7	(Australia) Ellen Perez	7	4	3

Qualifying competition
2	(China) Bai Zhuoxuan	4	6	6^{4}
WC	(France) Sarah Iliev	6	4	7^{7}

==== Third qualifier ====
First round					Qualifying competition
					WC	(France) Séverine Deppner	1	1
					6	(Estonia) Elena Malõgina	6	6
WC	(France) Myrtille Georges	2	7^{8}	4	6	(Estonia) Elena Malõgina	6	6
6	(Estonia) Elena Malõgina	6	6^{6}	6

==== Fourth qualifier ====
First round
4	(United States) Sophie Chang	6	7
(Slovakia) Tereza Mihalíková	3	5
(Chinese Taipei) Hsieh Su-wei	6	6
5	(Czech Republic) Jesika Malečková	4	4

Qualifying competition
4	(United States) Sophie Chang	2	4
(Chinese Taipei) Hsieh Su-wei	6	6
