= 2023 Internationaux de Strasbourg =

- Date: 21–27 May
- Edition: 37th
- Category: WTA 250
- Draw: 32S / 16D
- Prize money: €225,480
- Surface: Clay
- Location: Strasbourg, France
- Venue: Tennis Club de Strasbourg

Champions

Singles
- (Ukraine) Elina Svitolina

Doubles
- (China) Xu Yifan / (China) Yang Zhaoxuan
- Internationaux de Strasbourg

The 2023 Internationaux de Strasbourg was a women's professional tennis tournament played on outdoor clay courts in Strasbourg, France. It was the 37th edition of the tournament and part of the WTA 250 tournaments of the 2023 WTA Tour. It took place at the Tennis Club de Strasbourg between 21 and 27 May 2023.

== Finals ==
=== Singles ===
- (Ukraine) Elina Svitolina def. Anna Blinkova, 6–2, 6–3

=== Doubles ===
- (China) Xu Yifan / (China) Yang Zhaoxuan def. (United States) Desirae Krawczyk / (Mexico) Giuliana Olmos 6–3, 6–2

== Singles main-draw entrants ==
=== Seeds ===
Country	Player	Rank^{1}	Seed
POL	Magda Linette	19	1
~~BEL~~	~~Elise Mertens~~	~~26~~	~~2~~
CHN	Zhang Shuai	29	3
USA	Bernarda Pera	32	4
ROU	Sorana Cîrstea	34	5
	Varvara Gracheva	46	6
USA	Lauren Davis	53	7
SUI	Jil Teichmann	58	8

- Rankings are as of 8 May 2023.

=== Other entrants ===
The following players received wildcards into the singles main draw:

- Anastasia Pavlyuchenkova
- (Ukraine) Elina Svitolina

The following player received entry using a protected ranking into the singles main draw:

- (France) Amandine Hesse

The following players received entry from the qualifying draw:

- Angelina Gabueva
- (Chinese Taipei) Hsieh Su-wei
- (France) Sarah Iliev
- (Estonia) Elena Malõgina

The following players received entry as lucky losers:

- (China) Bai Zhuoxuan
- (United States) Sophie Chang
- (New Zealand) Erin Routliffe

=== Withdrawals ===
- (United States) Amanda Anisimova → replaced by (France) Océane Dodin
- (Romania) Ana Bogdan → replaced by (United States) Emma Navarro
- (Brazil) Beatriz Haddad Maia → replaced by (France) Alizé Cornet
- (Ukraine) Anhelina Kalinina → replaced by (Bulgaria) Viktoriya Tomova
- Anna Kalinskaya → replaced by (China) Bai Zhuoxuan
- (Ukraine) Marta Kostyuk → replaced by (Belgium) Maryna Zanevska
- (Belgium) Elise Mertens → replaced by (New Zealand) Erin Routliffe
- (Italy) Jasmine Paolini → replaced by (Australia) Kimberly Birrell
- (Czech Republic) Karolína Plíšková → replaced by (Spain) Cristina Bucșa
- (Czech Republic) Kateřina Siniaková → replaced by (Czech Republic) Tereza Martincová
- (Romania) Patricia Maria Țig → replaced by (France) Clara Burel
- (China) Wang Xiyu → replaced by (United States) Sophie Chang
- (China) Zhu Lin → replaced by (Germany) Anna-Lena Friedsam

== Doubles main-draw entrants ==
=== Seeds ===
Country	Player	Country	Player	Rank^{1}	Seed
USA	Nicole Melichar-Martinez	AUS	Ellen Perez	24	1
USA	Desirae Krawczyk	MEX	Giuliana Olmos	26	2
JPN	Shuko Aoyama	JPN	Ena Shibahara	41	3
CHN	Xu Yifan	CHN	Yang Zhaoxuan	44	4

- ^{1} Rankings as of 8 May 2023.

=== Other entrants ===
The following pairs received wildcards into the doubles main draw:

- (France) Séverine Deppner / (France) Sarah Iliev
- (France) Myrtille Georges / (France) Joanna Tomera
