= 1997 Internationaux de Strasbourg – Singles =

Singles
- 1997 Internationaux de Strasbourg
- 1996 Champion: (United States) Lindsay Davenport

Final
- Champion: (Germany) Steffi Graf
- Runner-up: (Croatia) Mirjana Lučić
- Score: 6–2, 7–5

Details
- Draw: 30
- Seeds: 8

Events
Singles	Doubles
← 1996 ·	Internationaux de Strasbourg	· 1998 →

Lindsay Davenport was the defending champion but lost in the second round to Natasha Zvereva.

First-seeded Steffi Graf won in the final 6–2, 7–5 against Mirjana Lučić.

== Seeds ==
A champion seed is indicated in bold text while text in italics indicates the round in which that seed was eliminated. The top two seeds received a bye to the second round.

1. (Germany) **Steffi Graf (champion)**
2. (United States) Lindsay Davenport (second round)
3. (South Africa) Amanda Coetzer (semifinals)
4. (Austria) Judith Wiesner (semifinals)
5. (Russia) Elena Likhovtseva (second round)
6. (Belgium) Sabine Appelmans (quarterfinals)
7. (France) Nathalie Tauziat (second round)
8. (Bulgaria) Magdalena Maleeva (first round)

== Draw ==
=== Key ===
- Q = Qualifier
- WC = Wild card
- LL = Lucky loser
- Alt = Alternate
- ITF = ITF entry
- PR = Protected ranking
- SR = Special ranking
- SE = Special exempt
- JE = Junior exempt
- JR = Junior Accelerator Programme entrant
- CO = College Accelerator Programme entrant
- NG = Next Gen Accelerator Program entrant
- w/o = Walkover
- r = Retired
- d = Defaulted

=== Final ===
Final
WC/1	(Germany) **Steffi Graf**	**6**	**7**
Q	(Croatia) Mirjana Lučić	2	5

=== Section 1 ===
First round
(Canada) **P Hy-Boulais**	3	**6**	**6**
(Czech Republic) H Suková	**6**	4	4
(Italy) F Perfetti	4	3
(France) **S Testud**	**6**	**6**
(France) A Fusai	3	2
5	(Russia) **E Likhovtseva**	**6**	**6**
3	(South Africa) **A Coetzer**	**6**	**6**
(Japan) N Sawamatsu	1	2
Q	(Argentina) M Díaz Oliva	6	2
(France) **A-G Sidot**	**7**	**6**
(Japan) **A Sugiyama**	**7**	**7**
(Germany) M Babel	6	6
(Japan) **N Kijimuta**	**7**	3	**6**
8	(Bulgaria) M Maleeva	5	**6**	1

Second round
WC/1	(Germany) **S Graf**	**6**	**6**
(Canada) P Hy-Boulais	3	2
(France) **S Testud**	**6**	**6**
5	(Russia) E Likhovtseva	3	0
3	(South Africa) **A Coetzer**	**7**	**6**
(France) A-G Sidot	5	4
(Japan) A Sugiyama	**7**	4	4
(Japan) **N Kijimuta**	5	**6**	**6**

Quarterfinals
WC/1	(Germany) **S Graf**	3	**6**	**6**
(France) S Testud	**6**	2	1
3	(South Africa) **A Coetzer**	**6**	**6**
(Japan) N Kijimuta	2	3

Semifinals
WC/1	(Germany) **S Graf**	4	**7**	**7**
3	(South Africa) A Coetzer	**6**	5	6

=== Section 2 ===
First round
6	(Belgium) **S Appelmans**	**6**	**6**
(Belgium) L Courtois	0	3
(Thailand) **T Tanasugarn**	**6**	5	**6**
(Argentina) P Suárez	2	**7**	3
WC	(France) **A Mauresmo**	**6**	**6**
Q	(United States) S Cacic	2	4
(Slovakia) K Studeníková	**6**	0	4
4	(Austria) **J Wiesner**	4	**6**	**6**
7	(France) **N Tauziat**	**7**	1	**6**
(Chinese Taipei) S-T Wang	6	**6**	2
(Germany) P Begerow	2	**6**	2
Q	(Croatia) **M Lučić**	**6**	4	**6**
(Belarus) **N Zvereva**	**6**	**6**
Q	(Madagascar) D Randriantefy	2	2

Second round
6	(Belgium) **S Appelmans**	**6**	6	**6**
(Thailand) T Tanasugarn	4	**7**	1
WC	(France) A Mauresmo	**6**	5	2
4	(Austria) **J Wiesner**	3	**7**	**6**
7	(France) N Tauziat	1	**6**	5
Q	(Croatia) **M Lučić**	**6**	3	**7**
(Belarus) **N Zvereva**	3	**7**	**6**
2	(United States) L Davenport	**6**	6	2

Quarterfinals
6	(Belgium) S Appelmans	3	4
4	(Austria) **J Wiesner**	**6**	**6**
Q	(Croatia) **M Lučić**	**7**	**6**
(Belarus) N Zvereva	5	3

Semifinals
4	(Austria) J Wiesner	5	**7**	6
Q	(Croatia) **M Lučić**	**7**	6	**7**
