= 2016 Internationaux de Strasbourg – Doubles =

Doubles
- 2016 Internationaux de Strasbourg

Final
- Champions: (Spain) Anabel Medina Garrigues (Spain) Arantxa Parra Santonja
- Runners-up: (Argentina) María Irigoyen (China) Liang Chen
- Score: 6–2, 6–0

Details
- Draw: 16
- Seeds: 4

Events
Singles	Doubles
- Internationaux de Strasbourg

Chuang Chia-jung and Liang Chen were the defending champions, but chose not to participate together. Chuang played alongside Darija Jurak, but lost in the semifinals to María Irigoyen and Liang.
Anabel Medina Garrigues and Arantxa Parra Santonja won the title, defeating Irigoyen and Liang in the final, 6–2, 6–0.

== Seeds ==
1. (Spain) Anabel Medina Garrigues / (Spain) Arantxa Parra Santonja (champions)
2. (Chinese Taipei) Chuang Chia-jung / (Croatia) Darija Jurak (semifinals)
3. (Argentina) María Irigoyen / (China) Liang Chen (final)
4. (Ukraine) Kateryna Bondarenko / (Ukraine) Olga Savchuk (withdrew)

== Draw ==
Key

- Q = Qualifier
- WC = Wild card
- LL = Lucky loser
- Alt = Alternate
- ITF = ITF entry
- PR = Protected ranking
- SR = Special ranking
- SE = Special exempt
- JE = Junior exempt
- JR = Junior Accelerator Programme entrant
- CO = College Accelerator Programme entrant
- NG = Next Gen Accelerator Program entrant
- w/o = Walkover
- r = Retired
- d = Defaulted

First round
1	(Spain) A Medina Garrigues (Spain) A Parra Santonja	6	6
(France) I Ramialison (France) C Sibille	2	2
(Canada) G Dabrowski (Spain) MJ Martínez Sánchez	6	6
(Ukraine) A Fomina (India) P Thombare	2	0
Alt	(Bosnia and Herzegovina) E Burgić Bucko (France) V Muntean	2	6	[5]
(Czech Republic) L Kunčíková (Czech Republic) K Stuchlá	6	2	[10]
(Russia) A Panova (United States) S Rogers	6	6
(Poland) K Jans-Ignacik (Switzerland) X Knoll	4	3
(China) Y Xu (China) S Zhang	4	1
(Spain) G García Pérez (Netherlands) E Wacanno	6	6
(Ukraine) L Kichenok (Ukraine) N Kichenok	1	1
3	(Argentina) M Irigoyen (China) C Liang	6	6
(United States) N Melichar (Poland) A Rosolska	w/o
(Japan) K Nara (United States) A Riske
(Argentina) N Podoroska (Switzerland) JB Teichmann	3	1
2	(Chinese Taipei) C-j Chuang (Croatia) D Jurak	6	6

Quarterfinals
1	(Spain) A Medina Garrigues (Spain) A Parra Santonja	7	7^{7}
(Canada) G Dabrowski (Spain) MJ Martínez Sánchez	5	6^{3}
(Czech Republic) L Kunčíková (Czech Republic) K Stuchlá	3	6^{4}
(Russia) A Panova (United States) S Rogers	6	7^{7}
(Spain) G García Pérez (Netherlands) E Wacanno	2	6^{5}
3	(Argentina) M Irigoyen (China) C Liang	6	7^{7}
(United States) N Melichar (Poland) A Rosolska	7^{7}	6^{4}	[8]
2	(Chinese Taipei) C-j Chuang (Croatia) D Jurak	6^{3}	7^{7}	[10]

Semifinals
1	(Spain) A Medina Garrigues (Spain) A Parra Santonja	7	6
(Russia) A Panova (United States) S Rogers	5	3
3	(Argentina) M Irigoyen (China) C Liang	5	6	[10]
2	(Chinese Taipei) C-j Chuang (Croatia) D Jurak	7	4	[8]

Final
1	(Spain) A Medina Garrigues (Spain) A Parra Santonja	6	6
3	(Argentina) M Irigoyen (China) C Liang	2	0
