= 2025 Internationaux de Strasbourg – Doubles =

Doubles
- 2025 Internationaux de Strasbourg

Final
- Champions: (Hungary) Tímea Babos (Brazil) Luisa Stefani
- Runners-up: (China) Guo Hanyu (United States) Nicole Melichar-Martinez
- Score: 6–3, 6–7^{(4–7)}, [10–7]

Events
Singles	Doubles
- Internationaux de Strasbourg

Tímea Babos and Luisa Stefani won the doubles title at the 2025 Internationaux de Strasbourg, defeating Guo Hanyu and Nicole Melichar-Martinez in the final, 6–3, 6–7^{(4–7)}, [10–7].

It was the first ever WTA tour title on a clay court tournament for Stefani .

Cristina Bucșa and Monica Niculescu were the reigning champions, but Niculescu did not participate this year. Bucșa partnered Xu Yifan, but they lost in the quarterfinals to Gabriela Dabrowski and Erin Routliffe.

== Seeds ==
1. (Canada) Gabriela Dabrowski / (New Zealand) Erin Routliffe (semifinals, withdrew)
2. (United States) Desirae Krawczyk / (Australia) Ellen Perez (first round)
3. (Ukraine) Lyudmyla Kichenok / (Ukraine) Nadiia Kichenok (first round)
4. (China) Jiang Xinyu / (Chinese Taipei) Wu Fang-hsien (semifinals)

== Draw ==
Key

- Q = Qualifier
- WC = Wild card
- LL = Lucky loser
- Alt = Alternate
- ITF = ITF entry
- PR = Protected ranking
- SR = Special ranking
- SE = Special exempt
- JE = Junior exempt
- JR = Junior Accelerator Programme entrant
- CO = College Accelerator Programme entrant
- NG = Next Gen Accelerator Program entrant
- w/o = Walkover
- r = Retired
- d = Defaulted

=== Draw ===
First round
1	(Canada) G Dabrowski (New Zealand) E Routliffe	6	6
(China) Xin Wang (China) S Zheng	2	2
(Czech Republic) B Krejčíková (Czech Republic) L Nosková	4	3
(Spain) C Bucșa (China) Y Xu	6	6
3	(Ukraine) L Kichenok (Ukraine) N Kichenok	3	1
(Czech Republic) M Bouzková; A Panova	6	6
(Hungary) T Babos (Brazil) L Stefani	6	6
WC	(France) M Georges (Germany) T Maria	2	3
(United States) C Dolehide (Hungary) F Stollár	7^{8}	7^{7}
(Slovakia) T Mihalíková (United Kingdom) O Nicholls	6^{6}	6^{5}
(United States) M Kessler (Mexico) R Zarazúa	3	3
4	(China) X Jiang (Chinese Taipei) F-h Wu	6	6
(Japan) M Kato (Indonesia) A Sutjiadi	6	4	[8]
(China) H Guo (United States) N Melichar-Martinez	3	6	[10]
(Japan) S Aoyama (Chinese Taipei) H-c Chan	2	6	[12]
2	(United States) D Krawczyk (Australia) E Perez	6	4	[10]

Quarterfinals
1	(Canada) G Dabrowski (New Zealand) E Routliffe	6	2	[10]
(Spain) C Bucșa (China) Y Xu	4	6	[8]
(Czech Republic) M Bouzková; A Panova
(Hungary) T Babos (Brazil) L Stefani	w/o
(United States) C Dolehide (Hungary) F Stollár	6^{5}	4
4	(China) X Jiang (Chinese Taipei) F-h Wu	7^{7}	6
(China) H Guo (United States) N Melichar-Martinez	6	6
(Japan) S Aoyama (Chinese Taipei) H-c Chan	3	2

Semifinals
1	(Canada) G Dabrowski (New Zealand) E Routliffe
(Hungary) T Babos (Brazil) L Stefani	w/o
4	(China) X Jiang (Chinese Taipei) F-h Wu	5	2
(China) H Guo (United States) N Melichar-Martinez	7	6

Final
(Hungary) T Babos (Brazil) L Stefani	6	6^{4}	[10]
(China) H Guo (United States) N Melichar-Martinez	3	7^{7}	[7]
