= 2010 Internationaux de Strasbourg – Doubles =

Doubles
- 2010 Internationaux de Strasbourg

Final
- Champion: (France) Alizé Cornet (United States) Vania King
- Runner-up: (Russia) Alla Kudryavtseva (Australia) Anastasia Rodionova
- Score: 3–6, 6–4, [10–7]

Details
- Draw: 16
- Seeds: 4

Events
Singles	Doubles
- Internationaux de Strasbourg

Nathalie Dechy and Mara Santangelo were the defending champions, but Dechy retired in 2009 and Santangelo chose not to compete this year.
Alizé Cornet and Vania King defeated Alla Kudryavtseva and Anastasia Rodionova in the final 3–6, 6–4, [10–7].

== Seeds ==
1. (Chinese Taipei) Chuang Chia-jung / (Czech Republic) Lucie Hradecká (quarterfinals, withdrew due to Hradecká's injury)
2. (Russia) Alla Kudryavtseva / (Australia) Anastasia Rodionova (final)
3. (France) Julie Coin / (Canada) Marie-Ève Pelletier (quarterfinals)
4. (Germany) Kristina Barrois / (Germany) Jasmin Wöhr (semifinals)

== Draw ==
Key

- Q = Qualifier
- WC = Wild card
- LL = Lucky loser
- Alt = Alternate
- ITF = ITF entry
- PR = Protected ranking
- SR = Special ranking
- SE = Special exempt
- JE = Junior exempt
- JR = Junior Accelerator Programme entrant
- CO = College Accelerator Programme entrant
- NG = Next Gen Accelerator Program entrant
- w/o = Walkover
- r = Retired
- d = Defaulted

=== Draw ===
First round
1	(Chinese Taipei) C-j Chuang (Czech Republic) L Hradecká	6	6
WC	(France) É Bacquet (France) M Georges	1	3
(Italy) ME Camerin (Chinese Taipei) K-c Chang	5	2
(France) A Cornet (United States) V King	7	6
3	(France) J Coin (Canada) M-È Pelletier	6	7
(Brazil) MF Alves (Argentina) J Cravero	4	6^{1}
(United States) J Craybas (Germany) J Görges	6	6
(Poland) M Kiszczyńska (Slovakia) L Tvarosková	2	2
(Austria) S Klemenschits (Germany) T Malek	2	4
(France) C Feuerstein (France) S Foretz	6	6
(United Kingdom) L Robson (United Kingdom) A Smith	3	2
4	(Germany) K Barrois (Germany) J Wöhr	6	6
(France) A Védy (United States) M Washington	5	3
WC	(France) K Mladenovic (Tunisia) S Sfar	7	6
(Croatia) D Jurak (France) S Lefèvre	3	1
2	(Russia) A Kudryavtseva (Australia) A Rodionova	6	6

Quarterfinals
1	(Chinese Taipei) C-j Chuang (Czech Republic) L Hradecká
(France) A Cornet (United States) V King	w/o
3	(France) J Coin (Canada) M-È Pelletier	6^{4}	4
(United States) J Craybas (Germany) J Görges	7	6
(France) C Feuerstein (France) S Foretz	3	2
4	(Germany) K Barrois (Germany) J Wöhr	6	6
WC	(France) K Mladenovic (Tunisia) S Sfar	2	4
2	(Russia) A Kudryavtseva (Australia) A Rodionova	6	6

Semifinals
(France) A Cornet (United States) V King	6	6
(United States) J Craybas (Germany) J Görges	1	2
4	(Germany) K Barrois (Germany) J Wöhr	1	6	[6]
2	(Russia) A Kudryavtseva (Australia) A Rodionova	6	3	[10]

Finals
(France) A Cornet (United States) V King	3	6	[10]
2	(Russia) A Kudryavtseva (Australia) A Rodionova	6	4	[7]
