= Gabriela Kučerová =

German tennis player

- Country (sports): Germany
- Born: 28 November 1977 (age 47); Prague, Czechoslovakia
- Height: 1.69 m (5 ft 7 in)
- Retired: 2002
- Plays: Right-handed
- Prize money: $43,812

Singles
- Career record: 123–91
- Career titles: 4 ITF
- Highest ranking: No. 180 (27 July 1998)

Grand Slam singles results
- Australian Open: Q1 (1999)
- US Open: Q1 (1998)

Doubles
- Career record: 33–38
- Career titles: 3 ITF
- Highest ranking: No. 252 (9 November 1998)

Gabriela Kučerová (born 28 November 1977) is a German former professional tennis player.

== Biography ==
Kučerová, who is originally from Prague, started playing tennis at the age of seven and was coached by her father Jaroslav, who was a top player in Czechoslovakia. Her elder sister, Magdalena Kučerová, also played on the WTA Tour.

A right-handed player, Kučerová turned professional in 1995 and reached a top singles ranking of 180 in the world, winning four ITF titles. As a doubles player she featured in her only WTA Tour main draw, which came at the 1999 Internationaux de Strasbourg.

== ITF finals ==
Legend
$50,000 tournaments
$25,000 tournaments
$10,000 tournaments

=== Singles (4–2) ===
Result	No.	Date	Tournament	Surface	Opponent	Score
Loss	1.	5 October 1997	Langenthal, Switzerland	Carpet (i)	(Czech Republic) Helena Vildová	3–6, 2–6
Win	1.	23 November 1997	Deauville, France	Carpet (i)	(Bulgaria) Lubomira Bacheva	6–3, 7–6
Win	2.	25 January 1998	Miami, United States	Hard	(United States) Lilia Osterloh	6–2, 6–1
Win	3.	12 April 1998	Calvi, France	Hard	(Belgium) Nancy Feber	7–5, 6–1
Loss	2.	22 August 1999	Koksijde, Belgium	Clay	(France) Sophie Erre	7–5, 6–7, 2–6
Win	4.	28 November 1999	Mallorca, Spain	Clay	(Romania) Oana Elena Golimbioschi	6–1, 6–2

=== Doubles (3–1) ===
Result	No.	Date	Tournament	Surface	Partner	Opponents	Score
Win	1.	22 June 1997	Tallinn, Estonia	Hard	(Germany) Magdalena Kučerová	(Hungary) Nóra Köves (Finland) Kirsi Lampinen	6–4, 6–1
Win	2.	10 August 1997	Paderborn, Germany	Clay	(Germany) Magdalena Kučerová	(Austria) Sabine Lutter (Germany) Katja Pohlmann	6–4, 6–2
Win	3.	14 December 1997	Ostrava, Czech Republic	Carpet (i)	(Germany) Magdalena Kučerová	(Czech Republic) Michaela Paštiková (Czech Republic) Libuše Průšová	6–3, 6–4
Loss	1.	1 November 1998	Poitiers, France	Hard (i)	(Czech Republic) Radka Pelikánová	(Russia) Olga Lugina (Russia) Elena Makarova	0–6, 1–6
