= 2010 Internationaux de Strasbourg – Singles =

Singles
- 2010 Internationaux de Strasbourg

Final
- Champion: (Russia) Maria Sharapova
- Runner-up: (Germany) Kristina Barrois
- Score: 7–5, 6–1

Details
- Draw: 32
- Seeds: 8

Events
Singles	Doubles
- Internationaux de Strasbourg

Aravane Rezaï was the defending singles champion at the Internationaux de Strasbourg tennis tournament, but she chose not to participate this year.

Top-seeded Maria Sharapova won in the final 7–5, 6–1 against Kristina Barrois.

== Seeds ==
1. (Russia) Maria Sharapova (champion)
2. (Russia) Elena Vesnina (first round)
3. (France) Virginie Razzano (second round)
4. (China) Peng Shuai (withdrew due to dizziness)
5. (Spain) Anabel Medina Garrigues (semifinals)
6. (Austria) Sybille Bammer (second round)
7. (Latvia) Anastasija Sevastova (quarterfinals)
8. (United Kingdom) Elena Baltacha (second round, retired due to back injury)

== Draw ==
Key

- Q = Qualifier
- WC = Wild card
- LL = Lucky loser
- Alt = Alternate
- ITF = ITF entry
- PR = Protected ranking
- SR = Special ranking
- SE = Special exempt
- JE = Junior exempt
- JR = Junior Accelerator Programme entrant
- CO = College Accelerator Programme entrant
- NG = Next Gen Accelerator Program entrant
- w/o = Walkover
- r = Retired
- d = Defaulted

=== Finals ===
Semifinals
1/WC	(Russia) Maria Sharapova	4	6	6
5	(Spain) Anabel Medina Garrigues	6	2	2
(Germany) Kristina Barrois	2	6	7
(United States) Vania King	6	2	6^{6}

Final
1/WC	(Russia) Maria Sharapova	7	6
(Germany) Kristina Barrois	5	1

=== Top half ===
First round
1/WC	(Russia) M Sharapova	6	3	6
(Russia) R Kulikova	3	6	1
Q	(Bulgaria) D Evtimova	6	7
(Germany) T Malek	4	5
Q	(Italy) ME Camerin	7	5	1
(Germany) J Görges	5	7	6
WC	(France) P Parmentier	6	4	5
6	(Austria) S Bammer	2	6	7
3/WC	(France) V Razzano	6	3	6
(Chinese Taipei) K-c Chang	3	6	4
(United States) J Craybas	2	1
(Sweden) S Arvidsson	6	6
(France) J Coin	5	2
(Czech Republic) L Hradecká	7	6
(Czech Republic) S Záhlavová	1	0
5	(Spain) A Medina Garrigues	6	6

Second round
1/WC	(Russia) M Sharapova	6	6
Q	(Bulgaria) D Evtimova	3	0
(Germany) J Görges	6	7
6	(Austria) S Bammer	1	6^{6}
3/WC	(France) V Razzano	6	3	2
(Sweden) S Arvidsson	3	6	6
(Czech Republic) L Hradecká	4	0	r
5	(Spain) A Medina Garrigues	6	3

Quarterfinals
1/WC	(Russia) M Sharapova	7	6
(Germany) J Görges	6^{2}	1
(Sweden) S Arvidsson	2	5
5	(Spain) A Medina Garrigues	6	7

Semifinals
1/WC	(Russia) M Sharapova	4	6	6
5	(Spain) A Medina Garrigues	6	2	2

=== Bottom half ===
First round
7	(Latvia) A Sevastova	6	6
Q	(Colombia) M Duque Mariño	1	1
WC	(France) K Mladenovic	6	1	7
(Switzerland) S Vögele	3	6	6^{5}
(Russia) A Kudryavtseva	4	3
(Austria) Y Meusburger	6	6
(Germany) K Barrois	6	3	7
LL	(France) S Foretz	2	6	6^{8}
8	(United Kingdom) E Baltacha	6	7
Q	(Romania) S Cîrstea	3	5
(Japan) A Morita	6	3	5
(Australia) A Rodionova	2	6	7
(France) A Cornet	6	6
(Chinese Taipei) Y-j Chan	3	3
(United States) V King	6	6
2	(Russia) E Vesnina	4	1

Second round
7	(Latvia) A Sevastova	6	6
WC	(France) K Mladenovic	1	2
(Austria) Y Meusburger	5	3
(Germany) K Barrois	7	6
8	(United Kingdom) E Baltacha	2	r
(Australia) A Rodionova	1
(France) A Cornet	3	2
(United States) V King	6	6

Quarterfinals
7	(Latvia) A Sevastova	1	5
(Germany) K Barrois	6	7
(Australia) A Rodionova	4	5
(United States) V King	6	7

Semifinals
(Germany) K Barrois	2	6	7
(United States) V King	6	2	6^{6}
