= 2024 Internationaux de Strasbourg – Doubles =

Doubles
- 2024 Internationaux de Strasbourg

Final
- Champions: (Spain) Cristina Bucșa (Romania) Monica Niculescu
- Runners-up: (United States) Asia Muhammad (Indonesia) Aldila Sutjiadi
- Score: 3–6, 6–4, [10–6]

Events
Singles	Doubles
- Internationaux de Strasbourg

Cristina Bucșa and Monica Niculescu defeated Asia Muhammad and Aldila Sutjiadi in the final, 3–6, 6–4, [10–6] to win the doubles tennis title at the 2024 Internationaux de Strasbourg.

Xu Yifan and Yang Zhaoxuan were the reigning champions, but Yang did not compete this year and Xu chose to compete in Rabat instead.

== Seeds ==
1. (United States) Nicole Melichar-Martinez / (Australia) Ellen Perez (first round)
2. (Netherlands) Demi Schuurs / (Brazil) Luisa Stefani (semifinals)
3. (Japan) Shuko Aoyama / (Ukraine) Lyudmyla Kichenok (first round)
4. (United States) Desirae Krawczyk / (United States) Bethanie Mattek-Sands (first round)

== Draw ==
Key

- Q = Qualifier
- WC = Wild card
- LL = Lucky loser
- Alt = Alternate
- ITF = ITF entry
- PR = Protected ranking
- SR = Special ranking
- SE = Special exempt
- JE = Junior exempt
- JR = Junior Accelerator Programme entrant
- CO = College Accelerator Programme entrant
- NG = Next Gen Accelerator Program entrant
- w/o = Walkover
- r = Retired
- d = Defaulted

=== Draw ===
First round
1	(United States) N Melichar-Martinez (Australia) E Perez	4	7^{7}	[4]
(Canada) L Fernandez (New Zealand) E Routliffe	6	6^{2}	[10]
(Chinese Taipei) H-c Chan (Chinese Taipei) F-h Wu	6	6
WC	(France) C Paquet (France) D Parry	4	2
3	(Japan) S Aoyama (Ukraine) L Kichenok	4	6^{2}
(United States) A Muhammad (Indonesia) A Sutjiadi	6	7^{7}
(Japan) M Kato (Ukraine) N Kichenok	4	2
(Japan) E Shibahara (China) Xin Wang	6	6
(Czech Republic) M Bouzková (Slovakia) T Mihalíková	1	3
(Spain) C Bucșa (Romania) M Niculescu	6	6
(United States) A Krueger (United States) S Stephens	7^{7}	6
4	(United States) D Krawczyk (United States) B Mattek-Sands	6^{3}	3
(Norway) U Eikeri (Estonia) I Neel	4	3
(Mexico) G Olmos; A Panova	6	6
D Shnaider; V Zvonareva	3	5
2	(Netherlands) D Schuurs (Brazil) L Stefani	6	7

Quarterfinals
(Canada) L Fernandez (New Zealand) E Routliffe	7^{7}	6
(Chinese Taipei) H-c Chan (Chinese Taipei) F-h Wu	6^{1}	3
(United States) A Muhammad (Indonesia) A Sutjiadi	6	6
(Japan) E Shibahara (China) Xin Wang	3	3
(Spain) C Bucșa (Romania) M Niculescu	6	6
(United States) A Krueger (United States) S Stephens	2	3
(Mexico) G Olmos; A Panova	2	3
2	(Netherlands) D Schuurs (Brazil) L Stefani	6	6

Semifinals
(Canada) L Fernandez (New Zealand) E Routliffe	3	7	[9]
(United States) A Muhammad (Indonesia) A Sutjiadi	6	5	[11]
(Spain) C Bucșa (Romania) M Niculescu	6	6
2	(Netherlands) D Schuurs (Brazil) L Stefani	1	4

Final
(United States) A Muhammad (Indonesia) A Sutjiadi	6	4	[6]
(Spain) C Bucșa (Romania) M Niculescu	3	6	[10]
