= 2024 Internationaux de Strasbourg – Singles =

Singles
- 2024 Internationaux de Strasbourg

Final
- Champion: (United States) Madison Keys
- Runner-up: (United States) Danielle Collins
- Score: 6–1, 6–2

Details
- Draw: 28
- Seeds: 8

Events
| Singles | Doubles |
- Internationaux de Strasbourg

Madison Keys defeated Danielle Collins in the final, 6–1, 6–2 to win the singles tennis title at the 2024 Internationaux de Strasbourg. She did not drop a set en route to her eighth career WTA Tour title. Keys became the first American since Jennifer Capriati in 1999 to win the title. This was the first all-American final on clay since the 2016 Italian Open, contested between Keys and Serena Williams.

Elina Svitolina was the defending champion, but lost in the second round to Clara Burel.

== Seeds ==
The top four seeds received a bye into the second round.

1. (Czech Republic) Markéta Vondroušová (quarterfinals)
2. (Brazil) Beatriz Haddad Maia (quarterfinals)
3. (United States) Danielle Collins (final)
4. (United States) Madison Keys (champion)
5. Liudmila Samsonova (semifinals)
6. Ekaterina Alexandrova (second round)
7. (Ukraine) Elina Svitolina (second round)
8. Anastasia Pavlyuchenkova (first round)

== Draw ==
Key

- Q = Qualifier
- WC = Wild card
- LL = Lucky loser
- Alt = Alternate
- ITF = ITF entry
- PR = Protected ranking
- SR = Special ranking
- SE = Special exempt
- JE = Junior exempt
- JR = Junior Accelerator Programme entrant
- CO = College Accelerator Programme entrant
- NG = Next Gen Accelerator Program entrant
- w/o = Walkover
- r = Retired
- d = Defaulted

=== Finals ===
Semifinals
(Ukraine) Anhelina Kalinina | 6^{3} | 2
3 | (United States) Danielle Collins | 7^{7} | 6
4 | (United States) Madison Keys | 6 | 6
5 | Liudmila Samsonova | 1 | 3

Final
3 | (United States) Danielle Collins | 1 | 2
4 | (United States) Madison Keys | 6 | 6

=== Top half ===
First round
(United States) S Stephens | 3 | 3
Q | (Poland) M Fręch | 6 | 6
Q | E Andreeva | 2 | 2
WC | (France) F Ferro | 6 | 6
(Ukraine) A Kalinina | 6 | 3 | 6
8 | A Pavlyuchenkova | 3 | 6 | 4
Q | (Kazakhstan) Y Putintseva | 0 | 5
(Czech Republic) K Siniaková | 6 | 7
WC | (Czech Republic) Ka Plíšková | 5 | 6 | 1
(France) C Burel | 7 | 0 | 6
(France) D Parry | 3 | 4
7 | (Ukraine) E Svitolina | 6 | 6

Second round
1/WC | (Czech Republic) M Vondroušová | 5 | 6 | 6
Q | (Poland) M Fręch | 7 | 1 | 0
WC | (France) F Ferro | 3 | 6 | 0
(Ukraine) A Kalinina | 6 | 3 | 6
3 | (United States) D Collins | 6 | 6
(Czech Republic) K Siniaková | 1 | 2
(France) C Burel | 7^{7} | 4 | 6
7 | (Ukraine) E Svitolina | 6^{1} | 6 | 1

Quarterfinals
1/WC | (Czech Republic) M Vondroušová | 7 | 3 | 2
(Ukraine) A Kalinina | 5 | 6 | 6
3 | (United States) D Collins | 6 | 6
(France) C Burel | 1 | 3

Semifinals
(Ukraine) A Kalinina | 6^{3} | 2
3 | (United States) D Collins | 7^{7} | 6

=== Bottom half ===
First round
6 | E Alexandrova | 6 | 7
Q | (Spain) C Bucșa | 0 | 5
(Poland) M Linette | 7 | 7
(Romania) S Cîrstea | 5 | 5
(China) Xin Wang | 6 | 7^{7}
A Kalinskaya | 4 | 6^{3}
5 | L Samsonova | 6 | 6^{5} | 6
(Czech Republic) B Krejčíková | 2 | 7^{7} | 4
(Canada) L Fernandez | 4 | 7^{7} | 6
A Potapova | 6 | 6^{4} | 3
(United States) E Navarro | 6 | 6
WC | (France) A Cornet | 4 | 1

Second round
6 | E Alexandrova | 7^{7} | 3 | 3
(Poland) M Linette | 6^{5} | 6 | 6
(China) Xin Wang | 5 | 0
4 | (United States) M Keys | 7 | 6
5 | L Samsonova | 4 | 6 | 6
(Canada) L Fernandez | 6 | 4 | 2
(United States) E Navarro | 4 | 6^{1}
2 | (Brazil) B Haddad Maia | 6 | 7^{7}

Quarterfinals
(Poland) M Linette | 1 | 3
4 | (United States) M Keys | 6 | 6
5 | L Samsonova | 6 | 6
2 | (Brazil) B Haddad Maia | 3 | 0

Semifinals
4 | (United States) M Keys | 6 | 6
5 | L Samsonova | 1 | 3

== Qualifying ==
=== Seeds ===
1. (Czech Republic) Marie Bouzková (qualifying competition)
2. (Kazakhstan) Yulia Putintseva (qualified)
3. (Poland) Magdalena Fręch (qualified)
4. (United States) Sofia Kenin (first round)
5. (United States) Ashlyn Krueger (qualifying competition)
6. (Spain) Cristina Bucșa (qualified)
7. (Australia) Daria Saville (qualifying competition)
8. Erika Andreeva (qualified)

=== Qualifiers ===
1. (Spain) Cristina Bucșa
2. (Kazakhstan) Yulia Putintseva
3. (Poland) Magdalena Fręch
4. Erika Andreeva

=== Qualifying draw ===
==== First qualifier ====
First round
1 | (Czech Republic) Marie Bouzková | 6 | 6
(France) Jessika Ponchet | 4 | 1
WC | (Georgia (country)) Sofia Shapatava | 3 | 3
6 | (Spain) Cristina Bucșa | 6 | 6

Qualifying competition
1 | (Czech Republic) Marie Bouzková | 4 | 6 | 4
6 | (Spain) Cristina Bucșa | 6 | 2 | 6

==== Second qualifier ====
First round
2 | (Kazakhstan) Yulia Putintseva | 6 | 6
(India) Ankita Raina | 1 | 0
Alt | Vera Zvonareva | 0 | 0
5 | (United States) Ashlyn Krueger | 6 | 6

Qualifying competition
2 | (Kazakhstan) Yulia Putintseva | 6 | 0 | 6
5 | (United States) Ashlyn Krueger | 1 | 6 | 3

==== Third qualifier ====
First round
3 | (Poland) Magdalena Fręch | 6 | 6
Jana Kolodynska | 2 | 1
WC | (France) Amandine Hesse | 1 | 1
7 | (Australia) Daria Saville | 6 | 6

Qualifying competition
3 | (Poland) Magdalena Fręch | 3 | 6 | 6
7 | (Australia) Daria Saville | 6 | 4 | 3

==== Fourth qualifier ====
First round
4 | (United States) Sofia Kenin | 4 | 6^{4}
(France) Chloé Paquet | 6 | 7^{7}
(France) Elsa Jacquemot | 3 | 4
8 | Erika Andreeva | 6 | 6

Qualifying competition
(France) Chloé Paquet | 3 | 5
8 | Erika Andreeva | 6 | 7
