= 1999 Internationaux de Strasbourg – Singles =

Singles
- 1999 Internationaux de Strasbourg

Final
- Champion: (United States) Jennifer Capriati
- Runner-up: (Russia) Elena Likhovtseva
- Score: 6–1, 6–3

Details
- Draw: 30
- Seeds: 8

Events
Singles	Doubles
- Internationaux de Strasbourg

The 1999 Internationaux de Strasbourg singles was the singles event of the thirteenth edition of the Internationaux de Strasbourg, a WTA Tier III tournament held in Strasbourg, France and part of the European clay court season. Irina Spîrlea was the champion from the previous year's edition of this tournament, but she did not partake in defence.

Entering as the world No. 113 and a former world No. 6 from 1991, Jennifer Capriati won her first tournament since 1993 without losing a set, defeating Russian second seed Elena Likhovtseva in the final.

== Seeds ==
The top two seeds received a bye to the second round.

1. (France) Nathalie Tauziat (quarterfinals)
2. (Russia) Elena Likhovtseva (final)
3. (Japan) Ai Sugiyama (quarterfinals)
4. (France) Nathalie Dechy (quarterfinals)
5. (United States) Corina Morariu (quarterfinals)
6. (Zimbabwe) Cara Black (second round)
7. (United States) Lisa Raymond (first round)
8. (France) Anne-Gaëlle Sidot (first round)

== Draw ==
Key

- Q = Qualifier
- WC = Wild card
- LL = Lucky loser
- Alt = Alternate
- ITF = ITF entry
- PR = Protected ranking
- SR = Special ranking
- SE = Special exempt
- JE = Junior exempt
- JR = Junior Accelerator Programme entrant
- CO = College Accelerator Programme entrant
- NG = Next Gen Accelerator Program entrant
- w/o = Walkover
- r = Retired
- d = Defaulted

=== Finals ===
Semifinals
(United States) Jennifer Capriati	6	7
Q	(Czech Republic) Denisa Chládková	4	5
(United States) Mary Joe Fernández	6^{5}	3
2	(Russia) Elena Likhovtseva	7^{7}	6

Final
(United States) Jennifer Capriati	6	6
2	(Russia) Elena Likhovtseva	1	3

=== Top half ===
First round
(France) É Loit	1	6	3
(Chinese Taipei) Wang S-t	6	4	6
(Thailand) T Tanasugarn	6^{6}	1
(United States) J Capriati	7^{8}	6
(Australia) A Molik	5	4
6	(Zimbabwe) C Black	7	6
3	(Japan) A Sugiyama	6	6
(Netherlands) M Oremans	3	1
Q	(Czech Republic) A Gerši	2	3
WC	(France) L Andretto	6	6
(China) Li F	6^{2}	3
(Bulgaria) M Maleeva	7^{7}	6
Q	(Czech Republic) D Chládková	6	6
7	(United States) L Raymond	1	3

Second round
1	(France) N Tauziat	6	6
(Chinese Taipei) Wang S-t	2	4
(United States) J Capriati	7^{7}	6
6	(Zimbabwe) C Black	6^{2}	4
3	(Japan) A Sugiyama	6	6
WC	(France) L Andretto	2	2
(Bulgaria) M Maleeva	4	6	3
Q	(Czech Republic) D Chládková	6	2	6

Quarterfinals
1	(France) N Tauziat	1	0
(United States) J Capriati	6	6
3	(Japan) A Sugiyama	6^{3}	2
Q	(Czech Republic) D Chládková	7^{7}	6

Semifinals
(United States) J Capriati	6	7
Q	(Czech Republic) D Chládková	4	5

=== Bottom half ===
First round
8	(France) A-G Sidot	2	6	1
(United States) MJ Fernández	6	3	6
WC	(France) S Foretz	4	7^{7}	7
(Sweden) Å Carlsson	6	6^{4}	5
Q	(Chinese Taipei) J Lee	3	6	3
(South Africa) J Kruger	6	4	6
(Netherlands) K Boogert	4	4
4	(France) N Dechy	6	6
5	(United States) C Morariu	6	6
(Venezuela) M Vento	1	2
(France) A Fusai	6^{0}	6	3
(France) A Cocheteux	7^{7}	3	6
LL	(United States) J Watanabe	4	3
Q	(Bulgaria) L Bacheva	6	6

Second round
(United States) MJ Fernández	7	6
WC	(France) S Foretz	5	1
(South Africa) J Kruger	4	0
4	(France) N Dechy	6	6
5	(United States) C Morariu	6	6
(France) A Cocheteux	3	3
Q	(Bulgaria) L Bacheva	3	3
2	(Russia) E Likhovtseva	6	6

Quarterfinals
(United States) MJ Fernández	7	6
4	(France) N Dechy	5	3
5	(United States) C Morariu	4	4
2	(Russia) E Likhovtseva	6	6

Semifinals
(United States) MJ Fernández	6^{5}	3
2	(Russia) E Likhovtseva	7^{7}	6

== Qualifying ==
=== Seeds ===
1. n.a.
2. (Czech Republic) Denisa Chládková (qualifier)
3. (Chinese Taipei) Janet Lee (qualifier)
4. (Canada) Sonya Jeyaseelan (second round)
5. (United States) Jolene Watanabe (qualifying competition, lucky loser)
6. (Bulgaria) Lubomira Bacheva (qualifier)
7. n.a.
8. (United States) Meilen Tu (second round)
9. (Czech Republic) Adriana Gerši (qualifier)
10. (United States) Samantha Reeves (qualifying competition)

=== Qualifiers ===
1. (Bulgaria) Lubomira Bacheva
2. (Chinese Taipei) Janet Lee
3. (Czech Republic) Adriana Gerši
4. (Czech Republic) Denisa Chládková

==== Lucky loser ====
1. (United States) Jolene Watanabe

== Qualifying draw ==
Key

- Q = Qualifier
- WC = Wild card
- LL = Lucky loser
- Alt = Alternate
- ITF = ITF entry
- PR = Protected ranking
- SR = Special ranking
- SE = Special exempt
- JE = Junior exempt
- JR = Junior Accelerator Programme entrant
- CO = College Accelerator Programme entrant
- NG = Next Gen Accelerator Program entrant
- w/o = Walkover
- r = Retired
- d = Defaulted

=== First qualifier ===
First round
10	(United States) Samantha Reeves	7	6
(Australia) Amanda Grahame	5	3
(United States) Jean Okada	2	3
(United Kingdom) Louise Latimer	6	6
(Kazakhstan) Irina Selyutina	0	6	6
(United Kingdom) Karen Cross	6	2	1
(Romania) Magda Mihalache	1	3
6	(Bulgaria) Lubomira Bacheva	6	6

Second round
10	(United States) Samantha Reeves	6	7
(United Kingdom) Louise Latimer	1	5
(Kazakhstan) Irina Selyutina	3	2
6	(Bulgaria) Lubomira Bacheva	6	6

Qualifying competition
10	(United States) Samantha Reeves	2	0
6	(Bulgaria) Lubomira Bacheva	6	6

=== Second qualifier ===
First round
3	(Chinese Taipei) Janet Lee	6	6
(India) Nirupama Vaidyanathan	1	3
(Italy) Francesca Lubiani	3	6	3
WC	(France) Virginie Buisson	6	1	6
(Austria) Sybille Bammer	6	7^{7}
WC	(Romania) Mihaela Vulpeş	1	6^{4}
(Germany) Angelika Rösch	1	0
8	(United States) Meilen Tu	6	6

Second round
3	(Chinese Taipei) Janet Lee	6	6
WC	(France) Virginie Buisson	3	3
(Austria) Sybille Bammer	6	7^{7}
8	(United States) Meilen Tu	2	6^{0}

Qualifying competition
3	(Chinese Taipei) Janet Lee	6^{2}	6	6
(Austria) Sybille Bammer	7^{7}	0	3

=== Third qualifier ===
First round
9	(Czech Republic) Adriana Gerši	6	6
(Argentina) María José Gaidano	4	3
Alt	(Germany) Adriana Barna	6	1	6
(United States) Mashona Washington	3	6	3
(Slovenia) Tina Pisnik	6	6
Alt	(Czech Republic) Eva Martincová	3	3
(Australia) Catherine Barclay	7	6^{4}	0
4	(Canada) Sonya Jeyaseelan	5	7^{7}	6

Second round
9	(Czech Republic) Adriana Gerši	7^{7}	6
Alt	(Germany) Adriana Barna	6^{4}	1
(Slovenia) Tina Pisnik	6	6
4	(Canada) Sonya Jeyaseelan	4	1

Qualifying competition
9	(Czech Republic) Adriana Gerši	6	6
(Slovenia) Tina Pisnik	3	3

=== Fourth qualifier ===
First round
5	(United States) Jolene Watanabe	6	6
(Morocco) Bahia Mouhtassine	3	4
WC	(Switzerland) Marie-Gayanay Mikaelian	6	6
WC	(France) Anne-Laure Heitz	2	1
(Belgium) Patty Van Acker	5	7^{7}	6
(Germany) Jasmin Wöhr	7	6^{2}	4
(Czech Republic) Radka Pelikánová	4	1
2	(Czech Republic) Denisa Chládková	6	6

Second round
5	(United States) Jolene Watanabe	6	6
WC	(Switzerland) Marie-Gayanay Mikaelian	1	4
(Belgium) Patty Van Acker	3	6^{7}
2	(Czech Republic) Denisa Chládková	6	7^{9}

Qualifying competition
5	(United States) Jolene Watanabe	6^{5}	3
2	(Czech Republic) Denisa Chládková	7^{7}	6
