= 2017 Internationaux de Strasbourg – Singles =

Singles
- 2017 Internationaux de Strasbourg

Final
- Champion: (Australia) Samantha Stosur
- Runner-up: (Australia) Daria Gavrilova
- Score: 5–7, 6–4, 6–3

Details
- Seeds: 8

Events
Singles	Doubles
- Internationaux de Strasbourg

Caroline Garcia was the defending champion, but lost in the semifinals to Daria Gavrilova.

Sixth-seeded Samantha Stosur won the title, defeating Gavrilova in the final, 5–7, 6–4, 6–3. This marked Stosur's ninth and final WTA singles title before her retirement in 2022.

== Seeds ==
1. (Denmark) Caroline Wozniacki (first round, retired)
2. (Russia) Elena Vesnina (first round)
3. (Croatia) Mirjana Lučić-Baroni (withdrew)
4. (Spain) Carla Suárez Navarro (quarterfinals)
5. (France) Caroline Garcia (semifinals)
6. (Australia) Samantha Stosur (champion)
7. (Australia) Daria Gavrilova (final)
8. (China) Peng Shuai (semifinals)
9. (Puerto Rico) Monica Puig (second round)

== Draw ==
Key

- Q = Qualifier
- WC = Wild card
- LL = Lucky loser
- Alt = Alternate
- ITF = ITF entry
- PR = Protected ranking
- SR = Special ranking
- SE = Special exempt
- JE = Junior exempt
- JR = Junior Accelerator Programme entrant
- CO = College Accelerator Programme entrant
- NG = Next Gen Accelerator Program entrant
- w/o = Walkover
- r = Retired
- d = Defaulted

=== Finals ===
Semifinals
8	(China) Peng Shuai	6^{0}	4
6/WC	(Australia) Samantha Stosur	7^{7}	6
5	(France) Caroline Garcia	4	2
7	(Australia) Daria Gavrilova	6	6

Final
6/WC	(Australia) Samantha Stosur	5	6	6
7	(Australia) Daria Gavrilova	7	4	3

=== Top half ===
First round
1	(Denmark) C Wozniacki	6^{8}	0^{r}
(United States) S Rogers	7^{10}	1
(Japan) R Ozaki	4	6	3
(China) Q Wang	6	3	6
WC	(France) A Hesse	6	6
(Russia) N Vikhlyantseva	4	4
WC	(France) A Cornet	6	5	1
8	(China) S Peng	3	7	6
4	(Spain) C Suárez Navarro	6	6
(Japan) N Osaka	3	2
(United States) C McHale	0	6	6
(Germany) A Petkovic	6	3	1
Q	(United States) M Brengle	6	4	7^{7}
(France) P Parmentier	1	6	6^{4}
(China) Y Duan	0	1
6/WC	(Australia) S Stosur	6	6

Second round
(United States) S Rogers	6	6
(China) Q Wang	4	4
WC	(France) A Hesse	5	2
8	(China) S Peng	7	6
4	(Spain) C Suárez Navarro	6	6
(United States) C McHale	4	1
Q	(United States) M Brengle	0	1
6/WC	(Australia) S Stosur	6	6

Quarterfinals
(United States) S Rogers	0	4
8	(China) S Peng	6	6
4	(Spain) C Suárez Navarro	6^{5}	4
6/WC	(Australia) S Stosur	7^{7}	6

Semifinals
8	(China) S Peng	6^{0}	4
6/WC	(Australia) S Stosur	7^{7}	6

=== Bottom half ===
First round
9	(Puerto Rico) M Puig	6	6
Q	(United States) J Boserup	1	0
(Switzerland) V Golubic	2	6	5
(Czech Republic) Kr Plíšková	6	4	7
Q	(Belarus) V Lapko	4	6	2
(Poland) M Linette	6	3	6
(United States) J Brady	3	4
5	(France) C Garcia	6	6
7	(Australia) D Gavrilova	6	6
(United States) L Chirico	2	3
(Luxembourg) M Minella	1	4
Q	(Russia) E Kulichkova	6	6
LL	(Turkey) Ç Büyükakçay	0	1
Q	(Australia) A Barty	6	6
Q	(Italy) C Giorgi	1	6	6
2/WC	(Russia) E Vesnina	6	1	1

Second round
9	(Puerto Rico) M Puig	2	3
(Czech Republic) Kr Plíšková	6	6
(Poland) M Linette	3	3
5	(France) C Garcia	6	6
7	(Australia) D Gavrilova	6	6^{5}	6
Q	(Russia) E Kulichkova	3	7^{7}	4
Q	(Australia) A Barty	6	6
Q	(Italy) C Giorgi	3	0

Quarterfinals
(Czech Republic) Kr Plíšková	6^{3}	2
5	(France) C Garcia	7^{7}	6
7	(Australia) D Gavrilova	6	6^{3}	7^{7}
Q	(Australia) A Barty	4	7^{7}	6^{5}

Semifinals
5	(France) C Garcia	4	2
7	(Australia) D Gavrilova	6	6

== Qualifying ==
=== Seeds ===
1. (United States) Madison Brengle (qualified)
2. (Australia) Ashleigh Barty (qualified)
3. (United States) Julia Boserup (qualified)
4. (Italy) Camila Giorgi (qualified)
5. (Bulgaria) Elitsa Kostova (qualifying competition)
6. (Turkey) Çağla Büyükakçay (qualifying competition, lucky loser)
7. (China) Zhang Kailin (qualifying competition)
8. (Russia) Elizaveta Kulichkova (qualified)
9. (France) Virginie Razzano (qualifying competition)
10. (France) Myrtille Georges (qualifying competition)
11. (Poland) Katarzyna Piter (qualifying competition)
12. (Chile) Daniela Seguel (first round)

=== Qualifiers ===
1. (United States) Madison Brengle
2. (Australia) Ashleigh Barty
3. (United States) Julia Boserup
4. (Italy) Camila Giorgi
5. (Belarus) Vera Lapko
6. (Russia) Elizaveta Kulichkova

=== Lucky loser ===
1. (Turkey) Çağla Büyükakçay

=== Draw ===
==== First qualifier ====
First round
1	(United States) Madison Brengle	6	2
(China) Yang Zhaoxuan	2	1^{r}
WC	(France) Sandra Bozinovic	2	1
7	(China) Zhang Kailin	6	6

Qualifying competition
1	(United States) Madison Brengle	6	6
7	(China) Zhang Kailin	3	1

==== Second qualifier ====
First round
2	(Australia) Ashleigh Barty	6	6
(France) Chloé Paquet	3	4
(France) Alizé Lim	4	1
9	(France) Virginie Razzano	6	6

Qualifying competition
2	(Australia) Ashleigh Barty	4	6	6
9	(France) Virginie Razzano	6	4	2

==== Third qualifier ====
First round
3	(United States) Julia Boserup	7^{7}	6
WC	(France) Harmony Tan	6^{1}	1
(Japan) Shuko Aoyama	2	7^{8}	5
11	(Poland) Katarzyna Piter	6	6^{6}	7

Qualifying competition
3	(United States) Julia Boserup	6	6
11	(Poland) Katarzyna Piter	2	1

==== Fourth qualifier ====
First round
4	(Italy) Camila Giorgi	6^{1}	6	7
(Ukraine) Dayana Yastremska	7^{7}	2	5
(Netherlands) Bibiane Schoofs	2	6	0
10	(France) Myrtille Georges	6	4	6

Qualifying competition
4	(Italy) Camila Giorgi	6	6
10	(France) Myrtille Georges	2	2

==== Fifth qualifier ====
First round
5	(Bulgaria) Elitsa Kostova	6	4	6
(Russia) Polina Leykina	4	6	2
(Belarus) Vera Lapko	6	6
12	(Chile) Daniela Seguel	1	4

Qualifying competition
5	(Bulgaria) Elitsa Kostova	3	4
(Belarus) Vera Lapko	6	6

==== Sixth qualifier ====
First round
6	(Turkey) Çağla Büyükakçay	7	6
WC	(France) Jade Suvrijn	5	4
WC	(France) Léa Tholey	3	1
8	(Russia) Elizaveta Kulichkova	6	6

Qualifying competition
6	(Turkey) Çağla Büyükakçay	5	2
8	(Russia) Elizaveta Kulichkova	7	6
