= Jolene Watanabe =

American tennis player (1968–2019)

- Full name: Jolene Watanabe-Glitz
- Country (sports): United States
- Born: August 31, 1968
- Died: June 22, 2019 (aged 50)
- Plays: Right-handed
- Prize money: US$ 517,164

Singles
- Career record: 319–270
- Highest ranking: No. 72 (February 3, 1997)

Grand Slam singles results
- Australian Open: 2R (1996, 1997)
- French Open: 3R (1995)
- Wimbledon: 2R (1994, 1996)
- US Open: 2R (1995)

Doubles
- Career record: 103–120
- Highest ranking: No. 142 (April 15, 1996)

Grand Slam doubles results
- Australian Open: 1R (1996)

Jolene Watanabe (August 31, 1968 – June 22, 2019) was an American international tennis player. She competed in the Australian Open 6 times, from 1994 to 2000. Jolene also competed in the French Open, Wimbledon, and the US Open making the second round in each of these tournaments. She obtained a career high singles ranking of 72 in 1997 and included a win over Jennifer Capriati. Jolene previously coached at the Van Der Meer Tennis Academy and most recently coached at Smith Stearns Tennis Academy serving as the Assistant Director. She coached numerous top players during her coaching career. As a junior Jolene played for the Southern California section. She attended the University of Nevada Las Vegas (UNLV) for her D1 collegiate tennis. She died from cancer of the appendix on June 22, 2019, on Hilton Head Island, South Carolina.
