= Internationaux de Strasbourg =

Coordinates: 48°35′56″N 7°41′25″E

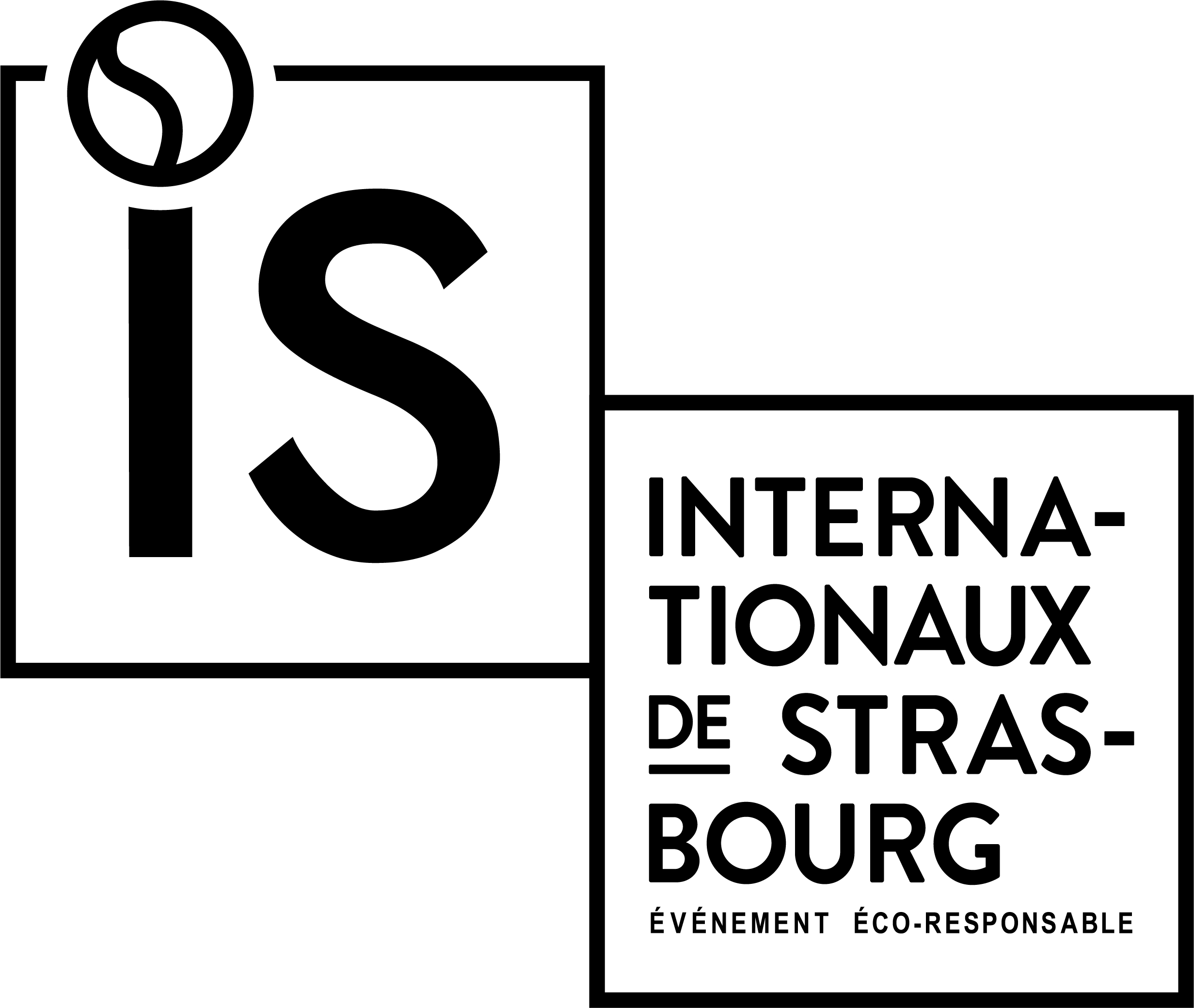

WTA Tour
- Founded: 1987; 39 years ago
- Editions: 40 (2025)
- Location: Strasbourg, France
- Venue: Tennis Club de Strasbourg
- Category: WTA 500 (2024-present); WTA 250 (2021-2023)
- Surface: Clay - outdoors
- Draw: 28S / 16Q / 16D
- Prize money: €1,049,083 (2026)
- Website: internationaux-strasbourg.fr

Current champions (2026)
- Singles: (United States) Emma Navarro
- Doubles: (Canada) Gabriela Dabrowski (Brazil) Luisa Stefani

The Internationaux de Strasbourg WTA500, is a professional women's tennis tournament held in Strasbourg, France. The tournament has been organized in May since its inception in 1987, il est avec Madrid et Rome un des tournois préparatoires the French Open which is played a week later.

The tournament was played at the Hautepierre before moving to the Strasbourg’s Tennis Club in 2011.

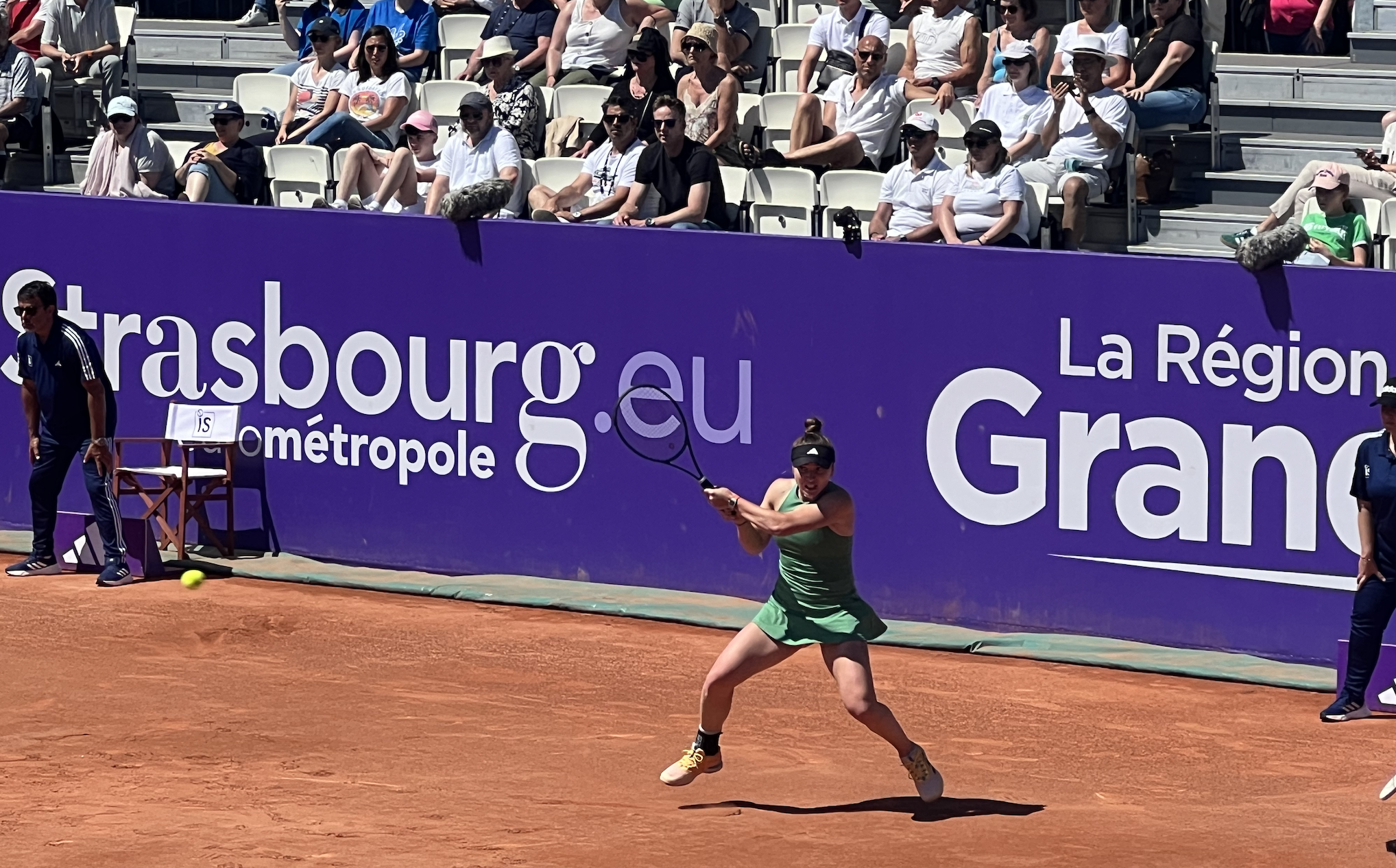
Elina Svitolina, tournament champion in 2020 and 2023, on May 20, 2024.

Past champions of the tournament include former world number ones Steffi Graf (singles), Jennifer Capriati (singles), Lindsay Davenport (two singles, one doubles), Maria Sharapova (singles), Angelique Kerber (singles), Martina Navratilova (doubles), and Ashleigh Barty (two doubles).

== Past finals ==
=== Singles ===
| Year | Champion | Runner-up | Score |
|---|---|---|---|
| 1987 | (Canada) Carling Bassett | (Italy) Sandra Cecchini | 6–3, 6–4 |
| 1988 | (Italy) Sandra Cecchini | (Austria) Judith Wiesner | 6–3, 6–0 |
| 1989 | (Czechoslovakia) Jana Novotná | (Argentina) Patricia Tarabini | 6–1, 6–2 |
| 1990 | (Argentina) Mercedes Paz | (United States) Ann Grossman | 6–2, 6–3 |
| 1991 | (Czechoslovakia) Radka Zrubáková | (Australia) Rachel McQuillan | 7–6^{(7–3)}, 7–6 ^{(7–3)} |
| 1992 | (Austria) Judith Wiesner | (Japan) Naoko Sawamatsu | 6–1, 6–3 |
| 1993 | (Japan) Naoko Sawamatsu | (Austria) Judith Wiesner | 4–6, 6–1, 6–3 |
| 1994 | (United States) Mary Joe Fernandez | (Argentina) Gabriela Sabatini | 2–6, 6–4, 6–0 |
| 1995 | (United States) Lindsay Davenport | (Japan) Kimiko Date | 3–6, 6–1, 6–2 |
| 1996 | (United States) Lindsay Davenport (2) | (Austria) Barbara Paulus | 6–3, 7–6 |
| 1997 | (Germany) Steffi Graf | (Croatia) Mirjana Lučić | 6–2, 7–5 |
| 1998 | (Romania) Irina Spîrlea | (France) Julie Halard-Decugis | 7–6^{(7–5)}, 6–3 |
| 1999 | (United States) Jennifer Capriati | (Russia) Elena Likhovtseva | 6–1, 6–3 |
| 2000 | (Croatia) Silvija Talaja | (Hungary) Rita Kuti-Kis | 7–5, 4–6, 6–3 |
| 2001 | (Italy) Silvia Farina Elia | (Germany) Anke Huber | 7–5, 0–6, 6–4 |
| 2002 | (Italy) Silvia Farina Elia (2) | (Federal Republic of Yugoslavia) Jelena Dokić | 6–4, 3–6, 6–3 |
| 2003 | (Italy) Silvia Farina Elia (3) | (Croatia) Karolina Šprem | 6–3, 4–6, 6–4 |
| 2004 | (Luxembourg) Claudine Schaul | (United States) Lindsay Davenport | 2–6, 6–0, 6–3 |
| 2005 | (Spain) Anabel Medina Garrigues | (Poland) Marta Domachowska | 6–4, 6–3 |
| 2006 | (Czech Republic) Nicole Vaidišová | (China) Peng Shuai | 7–6^{(9–7)}, 6–3 |
| 2007 | (Spain) Anabel Medina Garrigues (2) | (France) Amélie Mauresmo | 6–4, 4–6, 6–4 |
| 2008 | (Spain) Anabel Medina Garrigues (3) | (Slovenia) Katarina Srebotnik | 4–6, 7–6^{(7–4)}, 6–0 |
| 2009 | (France) Aravane Rezaï | (Czech Republic) Lucie Hradecká | 7–6^{(7–2)}, 6–1 |
| 2010 | (Russia) Maria Sharapova | (Germany) Kristina Barrois | 7–5, 6–1 |
| 2011 | (Germany) Andrea Petkovic | (France) Marion Bartoli | 6–4, 1–0 ret. |
| 2012 | (Italy) Francesca Schiavone | (France) Alizé Cornet | 6–4, 6–4 |
| 2013 | (France) Alizé Cornet | (Czech Republic) Lucie Hradecká | 7–6^{(7–4)}, 6–0 |
| 2014 | (Puerto Rico) Monica Puig | (Spain) Sílvia Soler Espinosa | 6–4, 6–3 |
| 2015 | (Australia) Samantha Stosur | (France) Kristina Mladenovic | 3–6, 6–2, 6–3 |
| 2016 | (France) Caroline Garcia | (Croatia) Mirjana Lučić-Baroni | 6–4, 6–1 |
| 2017 | (Australia) Samantha Stosur (2) | (Australia) Daria Gavrilova | 5–7, 6–4, 6–3 |
| 2018 | (Russia) Anastasia Pavlyuchenkova | (Slovakia) Dominika Cibulková | 6–7^{(5–7)}, 7–6^{(7–3)}, 7–6^{(8–6)} |
| 2019 | (Ukraine) Dayana Yastremska | (France) Caroline Garcia | 6–4, 5–7, 7–6^{(7–3)} |
| 2020 | (Ukraine) Elina Svitolina | (Kazakhstan) Elena Rybakina | 6–4, 1–6, 6–2 |
| 2021 | (Czech Republic) Barbora Krejčíková | (Romania) Sorana Cîrstea | 6–3, 6–3 |
| 2022 | (Germany) Angelique Kerber | (Slovenia) Kaja Juvan | 7–6^{(7–5)}, 6–7^{(0–7)}, 7–6^{(7–5)} |
| 2023 | (Ukraine) Elina Svitolina (2) | Anna Blinkova | 6–2, 6–3 |
↓ WTA 500 tournament ↓
| 2024 | (United States) Madison Keys | (United States) Danielle Collins | 6–1, 6–2 |
| 2025 | (Kazakhstan) Elena Rybakina | Liudmila Samsonova | 6–1, 6–7^{(2–7)}, 6–1 |
| 2026 | (United States) Emma Navarro | (Canada) Victoria Mboko | 6–0, 5–7, 6–2 |

=== Doubles ===
| Year | Champions | Runners-up | Score |
|---|---|---|---|
| 1987 | (Czechoslovakia) Jana Novotná (France) Catherine Suire | (United States) Kathleen Horvath (Netherlands) Marcella Mesker | 6–0, 6–2 |
| 1988 | (Netherlands) Manon Bollegraf (Australia) Nicole Provis | (Australia) Jenny Byrne (Australia) Janine Thompson | 7–5, 6–7^{(9–11)}, 6–3 |
| 1989 | (Argentina) Mercedes Paz (Austria) Judith Pölzl Wiesner | (South Africa) Lise Gregory (United States) Gretchen Rush Magers | 6–3, 6–3 |
| 1990 | (Australia) Nicole Provis (2) (South Africa) Elna Reinach | (United States) Kathy Jordan (Australia) Liz Smylie | 6–1, 6–4 |
| 1991 | (United States) Lori McNeil (United States) Stephanie Rehe | (Netherlands) Manon Bollegraf (Argentina) Mercedes Paz | 6–7^{(2–7)}, 6–4, 6–4 |
| 1992 | (United States) Patty Fendick (Czechoslovakia) Andrea Strnadová | (United States) Lori McNeil (Argentina) Mercedes Paz | 6–3, 6–4 |
| 1993 | (United States) Shaun Stafford (Hungary) Andrea Temesvári | (Canada) Jill Hetherington (United States) Kathy Rinaldi | 6–7^{(5–7)}, 6–3, 6–4 |
| 1994 | (United States) Lori McNeil (2) (Australia) Rennae Stubbs | (Argentina) Patricia Tarabini (Netherlands) Caroline Vis | 6–3, 3–6, 6–2 |
| 1995 | (United States) Lindsay Davenport (United States) Mary Joe Fernández | (Belgium) Sabine Appelmans (Netherlands) Miriam Oremans | 6–2, 6–3 |
| 1996 | (Indonesia) Yayuk Basuki (Australia) Nicole Provis Bradtke (3) | (United States) Marianne Werdel (United States) Tami Whitlinger Jones | 5–7, 6–4, 6–4 |
| 1997 | (Czech Republic) Helena Suková (Belarus) Natasha Zvereva | (Russia) Elena Likhovtseva (Japan) Ai Sugiyama | 6–1, 6–1 |
| 1998 | (France) Alexandra Fusai (France) Nathalie Tauziat | (Indonesia) Yayuk Basuki (Netherlands) Caroline Vis | 6–4, 6–3 |
| 1999 | (Russia) Elena Likhovtseva (Japan) Ai Sugiyama | (France) Alexandra Fusai (France) Nathalie Tauziat | 2–6, 7–6^{(8–6)}, 6–1 |
| 2000 | (Canada) Sonya Jeyaseelan (Argentina) Florencia Labat | (South Africa) Kim Grant (Venezuela) María Vento | 6–4, 6–3 |
| 2001 | (Italy) Silvia Farina Elia (Uzbekistan) Iroda Tulyaganova | (South Africa) Amanda Coetzer (United States) Lori McNeil | 6–1, 7–6^{(7–0)} |
| 2002 | (United States) Jennifer Hopkins (Croatia) Jelena Kostanić | (France) Caroline Dhenin (Croatia) Maja Matevžič | 0–6, 6–4, 6–4 |
| 2003 | (Canada) Sonya Jeyaseelan (2) (Croatia) Maja Matevžič | (United States) Laura Granville (Croatia) Jelena Kostanić | 6–4, 6–4 |
| 2004 | (Australia) Lisa McShea (Venezuela) Milagros Sequera | (Slovenia) Tina Križan (Slovenia) Katarina Srebotnik | 6–4, 6–1 |
| 2005 | (Spain) Rosa María Andrés Rodríguez (Romania) Andreea Ehritt-Vanc | (Poland) Marta Domachowska (Germany) Marlene Weingärtner | 6–3, 6–1 |
| 2006 | (South Africa) Liezel Huber (United States) Martina Navratilova | (Germany) Martina Müller (Romania) Andreea Vanc | 6–2, 7–6^{(7–1)} |
| 2007 | (China) Yan Zi (China) Zheng Jie | (Australia) Alicia Molik (China) Sun Tiantian | 6–3, 6–4 |
| 2008 | (Ukraine) Tatiana Perebiynis (China) Yan Zi (2) | (Chinese Taipei) Chan Yung-jan (Chinese Taipei) Chuang Chia-jung | 6–4, 6–7^{(3–7)}, [10–6] |
| 2009 | (France) Nathalie Dechy (Italy) Mara Santangelo | (France) Claire Feuerstein (France) Stéphanie Foretz | 6–0, 6–1 |
| 2010 | (France) Alizé Cornet (United States) Vania King | (Russia) Alla Kudryavtseva (Australia) Anastasia Rodionova | 3–6, 6–4, [10–7] |
| 2011 | (Uzbekistan) Akgul Amanmuradova (Chinese Taipei) Chuang Chia-jung | (South Africa) Natalie Grandin (Czech Republic) Vladimíra Uhlířová | 6–4, 5–7, [10–2] |
| 2012 | (Belarus) Olga Govortsova (Poland) Klaudia Jans-Ignacik | (South Africa) Natalie Grandin (Czech Republic) Vladimíra Uhlířová | 6–7^{(4–7)}, 6–3, [10–3] |
| 2013 | (Japan) Kimiko Date-Krumm (South Africa) Chanelle Scheepers | (Zimbabwe) Cara Black (New Zealand) Marina Erakovic | 6–4, 3–6, [14–12] |
| 2014 | (Australia) Ashleigh Barty (Australia) Casey Dellacqua | (Argentina) Tatiana Búa (Chile) Daniela Seguel | 4–6, 7–5, [10–4] |
| 2015 | (Chinese Taipei) Chuang Chia-jung (2) (China) Liang Chen | (Ukraine) Nadiia Kichenok (China) Zheng Saisai | 4–6, 6–4, [12–10] |
| 2016 | (Spain) Anabel Medina Garrigues (Spain) Arantxa Parra Santonja | (Argentina) María Irigoyen (China) Liang Chen | 6–2, 6–0 |
| 2017 | (Australia) Ashleigh Barty (2) (Australia) Casey Dellacqua (2) | (Chinese Taipei) Chan Hao-ching (Chinese Taipei) Chan Yung-jan | 6–4, 6–2 |
| 2018 | (Romania) Mihaela Buzărnescu (Romania) Raluca Olaru | (Ukraine) Nadiia Kichenok (Australia) Anastasia Rodionova | 7–5, 7–5 |
| 2019 | (Australia) Daria Gavrilova (1) (Australia) Ellen Perez | (China) Duan Yingying (China) Han Xinyun | 6–4, 6–3 |
| 2020 | (United States) Nicole Melichar (Netherlands) Demi Schuurs | (United States) Hayley Carter (Brazil) Luisa Stefani | 6–4, 6–3 |
| 2021 | (Chile) Alexa Guarachi (United States) Desirae Krawczyk | (Japan) Makoto Ninomiya (China) Yang Zhaoxuan | 6–2, 6–3 |
| 2022 | (United States) Nicole Melichar (2) (Australia) Daria Saville (2) | (Czech Republic) Lucie Hradecká (India) Sania Mirza | 5–7, 7–5, [10–6] |
| 2023 | (China) Xu Yifan (China) Yang Zhaoxuan | (United States) Desirae Krawczyk (Mexico) Giuliana Olmos | 6–3, 6–2 |
↓ WTA 500 tournament ↓
| 2024 | (Spain) Cristina Bucșa (Romania) Monica Niculescu | (United States) Asia Muhammad (Indonesia) Aldila Sutjiadi | 3–6, 6–4, [10–6] |
| 2025 | (Hungary) Tímea Babos (Brazil) Luisa Stefani (1) | (China) Guo Hanyu (United States) Nicole Melichar-Martinez | 6–3, 6–7^{(3–7)}, [10–7] |
| 2026 | (Canada) Gabriela Dabrowski (Brazil) Luisa Stefani (2) | (Norway) Ulrikke Eikeri (United States) Quinn Gleason | 7–5, 6–4 |

== See also ==
- List of tennis tournaments
