= 2013 Internationaux de Strasbourg – Singles =

Singles
- 2013 Internationaux de Strasbourg

Final
- Champion: (France) Alizé Cornet
- Runner-up: (Czech Republic) Lucie Hradecká
- Score: 7–6^{(7–4)}, 6–0

Details
- Draw: 8

Events
Singles	Doubles
- Internationaux de Strasbourg

Francesca Schiavone was the defending champion, but decided not to participate.

Alizé Cornet won the title, defeating Lucie Hradecká in the final 7–6^{(7–4)}, 6–0.

== Seeds ==
1. (France) Marion Bartoli (first round)
2. (Austria) Tamira Paszek (first round)
3. (France) Alizé Cornet (champion)
4. (Chinese Taipei) Hsieh Su-wei (second round)
5. (Romania) Monica Niculescu (second round)
6. (United States) Christina McHale (first round)
7. (South Africa) Chanelle Scheepers (quarterfinals)
8. (Slovakia) Daniela Hantuchová (first round)

== Draw ==
Key

- Q = Qualifier
- WC = Wild card
- LL = Lucky loser
- Alt = Alternate
- ITF = ITF entry
- PR = Protected ranking
- SR = Special ranking
- SE = Special exempt
- JE = Junior exempt
- JR = Junior Accelerator Programme entrant
- CO = College Accelerator Programme entrant
- NG = Next Gen Accelerator Program entrant
- w/o = Walkover
- r = Retired
- d = Defaulted

=== Finals ===
Semifinals
(Canada) Eugenie Bouchard	5	7^{7}	3
3	(France) Alizé Cornet	7	6^{5}	6
Q	(Italy) Flavia Pennetta	6	3	1
(Czech Republic) Lucie Hradecká	1	6	6

Final
3	(France) Alizé Cornet	7^{7}	6
(Czech Republic) Lucie Hradecká	6^{4}	0

=== Top half ===
First round
1	(France) M Bartoli	3	2
(Italy) C Giorgi	6	6
(Spain) S Soler Espinosa	3	3
(Canada) E Bouchard	6	6
(Georgia (country)) A Tatishvili	6^{4}	7	6
WC	(France) C Garcia	7^{7}	5	4
(New Zealand) M Erakovic	7^{9}	3	6^{5}
5	(Romania) M Niculescu	6^{7}	6	7^{7}
3	(France) A Cornet	6	6
(France) M Johansson	3	2
Q	(Poland) M Linette	6	7^{7}
(Russia) O Puchkova	4	6^{2}
Q	(United States) S Rogers	6	7
Q	(Poland) M Domachowska	2	5
WC	(France) C Feuerstein	5	4
7	(South Africa) C Scheepers	7	6

Second round
(Italy) C Giorgi	3	0
(Canada) E Bouchard	6	6
(Georgia (country)) A Tatishvili	4	6	6
5	(Romania) M Niculescu	6	3	2
3	(France) A Cornet	6	6
Q	(Poland) M Linette	3	4
Q	(United States) S Rogers	6	3	4
7	(South Africa) C Scheepers	2	6	6

Quarterfinals
(Canada) E Bouchard	6	6
(Georgia (country)) A Tatishvili	3	2
3	(France) A Cornet	6	6
7	(South Africa) C Scheepers	3	1

Semifinals
(Canada) E Bouchard	5	7^{7}	3
3	(France) A Cornet	7	6^{5}	6

=== Bottom half ===
First round
8	(Slovakia) D Hantuchová	3	6	6^{4}
(Spain) MT Torró Flor	6	4	7^{7}
(Ukraine) E Svitolina	4	2
Q	(Italy) F Pennetta	6	6
(Japan) M Doi	7	6
(Czech Republic) Ka Plíšková	5	2
(Germany) A Beck	7^{8}	5	1
4	(Chinese Taipei) S-w Hsieh	6^{6}	7	6
6	(United States) C McHale	5	3
(United States) L Davis	7	6
(Czech Republic) L Hradecká	6	6
(Spain) G Muguruza	4	3
(Sweden) J Larsson	6	2	6
(Czech Republic) P Cetkovská	2	6	3
WC	(France) V Razzano	6	6
2	(Austria) T Paszek	1	4

Second round
(Spain) MT Torró Flor	2	3
Q	(Italy) F Pennetta	6	6
(Japan) M Doi	6	4	7^{7}
4	(Chinese Taipei) S-w Hsieh	4	6	6^{3}
(United States) L Davis	2	2
(Czech Republic) L Hradecká	6	6
(Sweden) J Larsson	6	6
WC	(France) V Razzano	3	3

Quarterfinals
Q	(Italy) F Pennetta	7	6
(Japan) M Doi	5	3
(Czech Republic) L Hradecká	7	6
(Sweden) J Larsson	5	3

Semifinals
Q	(Italy) F Pennetta	6	3	1
(Czech Republic) L Hradecká	1	6	6

== Qualifying ==
=== Seeds ===
1. (Serbia) Vesna Dolonc (qualifying competition)
2. (Italy) Flavia Pennetta (qualified)
3. (Russia) Alexandra Panova (second round, withdrew)
4. (South Africa) Chanel Simmonds (first round)
5. (United States) Shelby Rogers (qualified)
6. (Spain) Arantxa Parra Santonja (second round)
7. (Ukraine) Yuliya Beygelzimer (qualifying competition)
8. (Slovenia) Maša Zec Peškirič (qualifying competition)

=== Qualifiers ===
1. (United States) Shelby Rogers
2. (Italy) Flavia Pennetta
3. (Poland) Marta Domachowska
4. (Poland) Magda Linette

=== Qualifying draw ===
==== First qualifier ====
First round
1	(Serbia) Vesna Dolonc	6	7^{7}
(Poland) Justyna Jegiołka	0	6^{5}
(Bulgaria) Isabella Shinikova	6^{3}	6	6
(United States) Tori Kinard	7^{7}	4	1
WC	(France) Marie Klocker	3	4
(Switzerland) Conny Perrin	6	6
(Australia) Karolina Wlodarczak	2	4
5/WC	(United States) Shelby Rogers	6	6

Second round
1	(Serbia) Vesna Dolonc	6	7
(Bulgaria) Isabella Shinikova	0	5
(Switzerland) Conny Perrin	5	6	2
5/WC	(United States) Shelby Rogers	7	4	6

Qualifying competition
1	(Serbia) Vesna Dolonc	4	2
5/WC	(United States) Shelby Rogers	6	6

==== Second qualifier ====
First round
2	(Italy) Flavia Pennetta	6	6
(France) Myrtille Georges	3	1
(Poland) Katarzyna Piter	6	6
(United States) Asia Muhammad	1	1
(Italy) Anna Remondina	7	6
WC	(United States) Allie Will	5	3
WC	(France) Victoria Muntean	1	1
7	(Ukraine) Yuliya Beygelzimer	6	6

Second round
2	(Italy) Flavia Pennetta	7	6
(Poland) Katarzyna Piter	5	1
(Italy) Anna Remondina	1	2
7	(Ukraine) Yuliya Beygelzimer	6	6

Qualifying competition
2	(Italy) Flavia Pennetta	5	6	6
7	(Ukraine) Yuliya Beygelzimer	7	1	4

==== Third qualifier ====
First round
3	(Russia) Alexandra Panova	6^{6}	6	6
(Switzerland) Lara Michel	7^{8}	1	2
WC	(Russia) Eugeniya Pashkova	6	2	3
WC	(Germany) Carolin Daniels	1	6	6
(Poland) Marta Domachowska	7	6
(France) Constance Sibille	5	2
(Germany) Kristina Barrois	2	3
6	(Spain) Arantxa Parra Santonja	6	6

Second round
3	(Russia) Alexandra Panova
WC	(Germany) Carolin Daniels	w/o
(Poland) Marta Domachowska	6	7
6	(Spain) Arantxa Parra Santonja	3	5

Qualifying competition
WC	(Germany) Carolin Daniels	4	6	2
(Poland) Marta Domachowska	6	2	6

==== Fourth qualifier ====
First round
4	(South Africa) Chanel Simmonds	4	6	3
(Slovakia) Lenka Juríková	6	4	6
(Belarus) Polina Pekhova	0	3
(Poland) Magda Linette	6	6
(Switzerland) Viktorija Golubic	6	4	6
(Germany) Kim Grajdek	3	6	1
WC	(France) Océane Adam	1	1
8	(Slovenia) Maša Zec Peškirič	6	6

Second round
(Slovakia) Lenka Juríková	2	4
(Poland) Magda Linette	6	6
(Switzerland) Viktorija Golubic	3	1
8	(Slovenia) Maša Zec Peškirič	6	6

Qualifying competition
(Poland) Magda Linette	6	6
8	(Slovenia) Maša Zec Peškirič	2	0
