= 2014 Internationaux de Strasbourg – Singles =

Singles
- 2014 Internationaux de Strasbourg

Final
- Champion: (Puerto Rico) Monica Puig
- Runner-up: (Spain) Sílvia Soler Espinosa
- Score: 6–4, 6–3

Details
- Seeds: 8

Events
Singles	Doubles
- Internationaux de Strasbourg

Alizé Cornet was the defending champion, but lost to Camila Giorgi in the first round.

Monica Puig won her first WTA title, defeating Sílvia Soler Espinosa in the final 6–4, 6–3.

== Seeds ==
1. (United States) Sloane Stephens (first round)
2. (France) Alizé Cornet (first round)
3. (Belgium) Kirsten Flipkens (first round)
4. (Germany) Andrea Petkovic (quarterfinals)

5. (Russia) Elena Vesnina (first round)
6. (Serbia) Bojana Jovanovski (first round)
7. (China) Peng Shuai (second round)
8. (United States) Alison Riske (second round)

== Draw ==
Key

- Q = Qualifier
- WC = Wild card
- LL = Lucky loser
- Alt = Alternate
- ITF = ITF entry
- PR = Protected ranking
- SR = Special ranking
- SE = Special exempt
- JE = Junior exempt
- JR = Junior Accelerator Programme entrant
- CO = College Accelerator Programme entrant
- NG = Next Gen Accelerator Program entrant
- w/o = Walkover
- r = Retired
- d = Defaulted

=== Finals ===
Semifinals
(United States) Madison Keys	5	3
(Puerto Rico) Monica Puig	7	6
(United States) Christina McHale	7	6^{7}	3
Q	(Spain) Sílvia Soler Espinosa	5	7^{9}	6

Final
(Puerto Rico) Monica Puig	6	6
Q	(Spain) Sílvia Soler Espinosa	4	3

=== Top half ===
First round
1/WC	(United States) S Stephens	3	2
(Germany) J Görges	6	6
Q	(Belarus) O Govortsova	2	4
(United States) L Davis	6	6
(Spain) MT Torró Flor	6^{2}	2
(United States) M Keys	7^{7}	6
(Brazil) T Pereira	3	3
8	(United States) A Riske	6	6
4	(Germany) A Petkovic	6	6
WC	(France) P Parmentier	3	4
(Argentina) P Ormaechea	7	2	1
(United States) V King	5	6	6
(Sweden) J Larsson	5	6^{5}
(Puerto Rico) M Puig	7	7^{7}
Q	(Croatia) M Lučić-Baroni	6	6
6	(Serbia) B Jovanovski	4	0

Second round
(Germany) J Görges	7	6
(United States) L Davis	5	4
(United States) M Keys	6	6
8	(United States) A Riske	4	4
4	(Germany) A Petkovic	6	6
(United States) V King	3	2
(Puerto Rico) M Puig	6	6
Q	(Croatia) M Lučić-Baroni	3	1

Quarterfinals
(Germany) J Görges	2	6	2
(United States) M Keys	6	2	6
4	(Germany) A Petkovic	4	4
(Puerto Rico) M Puig	6	6

Semifinals
(United States) M Keys	5	3
(Puerto Rico) M Puig	7	6

=== Bottom half ===
First round
5	(Russia) E Vesnina	5	6	3
(Australia) C Dellacqua	7	3	6
(Romania) A Cadanțu	1	2
(United States) C McHale	6	6
(Croatia) A Tomljanović	6	6
(France) K Mladenovic	4	0
(Kazakhstan) Z Diyas	6	6^{3}	6
3	(Belgium) K Flipkens	2	7^{7}	3
7	(China) S Peng	7	7
Q	(Australia) A Barty	5	5
Q	(Spain) S Soler Espinosa	6	7^{7}
(Switzerland) S Vögele	0	6^{5}
(Canada) S Fichman	2	4
WC	(France) C Feuerstein	6	6
(Italy) C Giorgi	6	1	6
2	(France) A Cornet	4	6	3

Second round
(Australia) C Dellacqua	3	5
(United States) C McHale	6	7
(Croatia) A Tomljanović	4	6^{4}
(Kazakhstan) Z Diyas	6	7^{7}
7	(China) S Peng	4	6	2
Q	(Spain) S Soler Espinosa	6	4	6
WC	(France) C Feuerstein	7	5	6^{2}
(Italy) C Giorgi	5	7	7^{7}

Quarterfinals
(United States) C McHale	6	3
(Kazakhstan) Z Diyas	2	1^{r}
Q	(Spain) S Soler Espinosa	3	6	7
(Italy) C Giorgi	6	4	5

Semifinals
(United States) C McHale	7	6^{7}	3
Q	(Spain) S Soler Espinosa	5	7^{9}	6

== Qualifying ==
=== Seeds ===
1. (China) Zheng Jie (qualifying competition)
2. (Kazakhstan) Zarina Diyas (moved to main draw)
3. (Japan) Misaki Doi (qualifying competition)
4. (Belarus) Olga Govortsova (qualified)
5. (United States) Anna Tatishvili (qualifying competition, retired)
6. (Croatia) Mirjana Lučić-Baroni (qualified)
7. (Spain) Sílvia Soler Espinosa (qualified)
8. (Thailand) Luksika Kumkhum (first round)
9. (China) Zheng Saisai (qualifying competition)

=== Qualifiers ===
1. (Croatia) Mirjana Lučić-Baroni
2. (Australia) Ashleigh Barty
3. (Spain) Sílvia Soler Espinosa
4. (Belarus) Olga Govortsova

=== Draw ===
==== First qualifier ====
First round
1	(China) Zheng Jie	6	0	6
(France) Alizé Lim	2	6	2
(Brazil) Gabriela Cé	5	4
Alt	(United States) Samantha Crawford	7	6
(United States) Shelby Rogers	6	1	2
(Chinese Taipei) Chan Yung-jan	4	6	6
(Ukraine) Sofiya Kovalets	2	1
6	(Croatia) Mirjana Lučić-Baroni	6	6

Second round
1	(China) Zheng Jie	6	6
Alt	(United States) Samantha Crawford	3	4
(Chinese Taipei) Chan Yung-jan	4	2
6	(Croatia) Mirjana Lučić-Baroni	6	6

Qualifying competition
1	(China) Zheng Jie	6^{5}	6	5
6	(Croatia) Mirjana Lučić-Baroni	7^{7}	4	7

==== Second qualifier ====
First round
5	(United States) Anna Tatishvili	6	6
(South Africa) Chanel Simmonds	1	4
WC	(Germany) Carina Litfin	2	1
(Luxembourg) Mandy Minella	6	6
(Australia) Ashleigh Barty	2	6	7^{7}
(United States) Louisa Chirico	6	4	6^{0}
(Romania) Alexandra Dulgheru	6	6
8	(Thailand) Luksika Kumkhum	2	2

Second round
5	(United States) Anna Tatishvili	7	0	7^{8}
(Luxembourg) Mandy Minella	5	6	6^{6}
(Australia) Ashleigh Barty	6	6
(Romania) Alexandra Dulgheru	3	4

Qualifying competition
5	(United States) Anna Tatishvili	1	0^{r}
(Australia) Ashleigh Barty	6	0

==== Third qualifier ====
First round
3	(Japan) Misaki Doi	6	6
(Romania) Ana Bogdan	0	4
(Canada) Gabriela Dabrowski	6	7^{7}
(Canada) Françoise Abanda	3	6^{4}
(France) Amandine Hesse	6	6
WC	(France) Océane Adam	2	3
(United States) Sanaz Marand	2	5
7	(Spain) Sílvia Soler Espinosa	6	7

Second round
3	(Japan) Misaki Doi	3	6	6
(Canada) Gabriela Dabrowski	6	4	2
(France) Amandine Hesse	1	3
7	(Spain) Sílvia Soler Espinosa	6	6

Qualifying competition
3	(Japan) Misaki Doi	4	2
7	(Spain) Sílvia Soler Espinosa	6	6

==== Fourth qualifier ====
First round
4	(Belarus) Olga Govortsova	6	6
(Italy) Gioia Barbieri	4	1
WC	(France) Fiona Ferro	5	1
(Ukraine) Yuliya Beygelzimer	7	6
WC	(France) Victoria Muntean	3	3
(France) Myrtille Georges	6	6
(Netherlands) Cindy Burger	3	1
9	(China) Zheng Saisai	6	6

Second round
4	(Belarus) Olga Govortsova	6	6
(Ukraine) Yuliya Beygelzimer	4	4
(France) Myrtille Georges	1	2
9	(China) Zheng Saisai	6	6

Qualifying competition
4	(Belarus) Olga Govortsova	6	6
9	(China) Zheng Saisai	2	4
