= 2015 Internationaux de Strasbourg – Doubles =

Doubles
- 2015 Internationaux de Strasbourg

Final
- Champions: (Chinese Taipei) Chuang Chia-jung (China) Liang Chen
- Runners-up: (Ukraine) Nadiia Kichenok (China) Zheng Saisai
- Score: 4–6, 6–4, [12–10]

Events
Singles	Doubles
← 2014 ·	Internationaux de Strasbourg	· 2016 →

The doubles tennis tournament at the 2015 Internationaux de Strasbourg took place in Strasbourg, France, as part of the 2015 WTA Tour.

Ashleigh Barty and Casey Dellacqua were the defending champions, but chose not to participate this year.
Chuang Chia-jung and Liang Chen won the title, defeating Nadiia Kichenok and Zheng Saisai in the final, 4–6, 6–4, [12–10].

== Seeds ==
All seeds received a bye into the quarterfinals.

1. (Chinese Taipei) Chuang Chia-jung / (China) Liang Chen (champions)
2. (Ukraine) Nadiia Kichenok / (China) Zheng Saisai (final)
3. (United States) Raquel Kops-Jones / (United States) Taylor Townsend (semifinals)
4. (United Kingdom) Jocelyn Rae / (United Kingdom) Anna Smith (semifinals)

== Draw ==
=== Key ===
- Q = Qualifier
- WC = Wild card
- LL = Lucky loser
- Alt = Alternate
- SE = Special exempt
- PR = Protected ranking
- ITF = ITF entry
- JE = Junior exempt
- w/o = Walkover
- r = Retired
- d = Defaulted
- SR = Special ranking

First round
(Argentina) T Búa (France) L Thorpe	6^{3}	5
(United States) M Brengle (United States) A Muhammad	7^{7}	7
(United States) I Falconi (United States) S Rogers	4	4
(France) I Ramialison (France) C Sibille	6	6
(Ukraine) A Fomina (Czech Republic) P Krejsová	7	6^{3}	[9]
(Germany) C Daniels (South Africa) M Sammons	5	7^{7}	[11]
WC	(Poland) A Barańska (France) V Muntean	2	2
(France) A Cornet (Poland) M Linette	6	6

Quarterfinals
1	(Chinese Taipei) C-j Chuang (China) C Liang	6	6^{5}	[10]
(United States) M Brengle (United States) A Muhammad	1	7^{7}	[4]
3	(United States) R Kops-Jones (United States) T Townsend	6	6
(France) I Ramialison (France) C Sibille	4	4
(Germany) C Daniels (South Africa) M Sammons	3	4
4	(United Kingdom) J Rae (United Kingdom) A Smith	6	6
(France) A Cornet (Poland) M Linette	2	6	[6]
2	(Ukraine) N Kichenok (China) S Zheng	6	1	[10]

Semifinals
1	(Chinese Taipei) C-j Chuang (China) C Liang	3	6	[10]
3	(United States) R Kops-Jones (United States) T Townsend	6	3	[6]
4	(United Kingdom) J Rae (United Kingdom) A Smith	1	7	[3]
2	(Ukraine) N Kichenok (China) S Zheng	6	5	[10]

Final
1	(Chinese Taipei) C-j Chuang (China) C Liang	4	6	[12]
2	(Ukraine) N Kichenok (China) S Zheng	6	4	[10]
