= 2013 Internationaux de Strasbourg =

- Date: 18–25 May
- Edition: 27th
- Category: WTA International
- Draw: 32S / 16D
- Prize money: $235,000
- Surface: Clay
- Location: Strasbourg, France
- Venue: Tennis Club de Strasbourg

Champions

Singles
- (France) Alizé Cornet

Doubles
- (Japan) Kimiko Date-Krumm / (South Africa) Chanelle Scheepers
← 2012 ·	Internationaux de Strasbourg	· 2014 →

The 2013 Internationaux de Strasbourg was a professional women's tennis tournament played on clay courts. It was the 27th edition of the tournament and was part of the 2013 WTA Tour. It took place in Strasbourg, France between 18 May and 25 May 2013. Third-seeded Alizé Cornet won the singles title.

== Finals ==
=== Singles ===
- (France) Alizé Cornet defeated (Czech Republic) Lucie Hradecká, 7–6^{(7–4)}, 6–0

=== Doubles ===
- (Japan) 'Kimiko Date-Krumm / (South Africa) Chanelle Scheepers defeated (Zimbabwe) Cara Black / (New Zealand) Marina Erakovic, 6–4, 3–6, [14–12]

== Singles main draw entrants ==
=== Seeds ===
Country	Player	Rank^{1}	Seed
FRA	Marion Bartoli	14	1
AUT	Tamira Paszek	29	2
FRA	Alizé Cornet	30	3
TPE	Hsieh Su-wei	41	4
ROU	Monica Niculescu	46	5
USA	Christina McHale	54	6
RSA	Chanelle Scheepers	57	7
SVK	Daniela Hantuchová	61	8

- ^{1} Rankings are as of May 13, 2013.

=== Other entrants ===
The following players received wildcards into the singles main draw:

- (France) Claire Feuerstein
- (France) Caroline Garcia
- (France) Virginie Razzano

The following players received entry from the qualifying draw:

- (Poland) Marta Domachowska
- (Poland) Magda Linette
- (Italy) Flavia Pennetta
- (United States) Shelby Rogers

=== Withdrawals ===
Before the tournament

- (Spain) Lara Arruabarrena
- (Russia) Maria Kirilenko
- (Spain) Anabel Medina Garrigues
- (France) Pauline Parmentier
- (United Kingdom) Heather Watson (mononucleosis)

== Doubles main draw entrants ==
=== Seeds ===
Country	Player	Country	Player	Rank^{1}	Seed
SVK	Daniela Hantuchová	CZE	Lucie Hradecká	57	1
RSA	Natalie Grandin	CZE	Vladimíra Uhlířová	83	2
ZIM	Cara Black	NZL	Marina Erakovic	86	3
JPN	Kimiko Date-Krumm	RSA	Chanelle Scheepers	146	4

- ^{1} Rankings are as of May 13, 2013.

=== Other entrants ===
The following pairs received wildcards into the doubles main draw:

- (France) Claire Feuerstein / (Switzerland) Lara Michel
- (France) Caroline Garcia / (France) Mathilde Johansson

The following pair received entry as alternates:

- (Poland) Marta Domachowska / (Spain) María Teresa Torró Flor

=== Withdrawals ===
Before the tournament

- (Russia) Olga Puchkova

During the tournament

- (Slovakia) Daniela Hantuchová (right shoulder injury)
