= 2013 Internationaux de Strasbourg – Doubles =

Doubles
- 2013 Internationaux de Strasbourg

Final
- Champions: (Japan) Kimiko Date-Krumm (South Africa) Chanelle Scheepers
- Runners-up: (Zimbabwe) Cara Black (New Zealand) Marina Erakovic
- Score: 6–4, 3–6, [14–12]

Events
Singles	Doubles
← 2012 ·	Internationaux de Strasbourg	· 2014 →

Olga Govortsova and Klaudia Jans-Ignacik were the defending champions but decided not to participate.
Kimiko Date-Krumm and Chanelle Scheepers won the title, defeating Cara Black and Marina Erakovic, 6–4, 3–6, [14–12].

== Seeds ==
1. (Slovakia) Daniela Hantuchová / (Czech Republic) Lucie Hradecká (withdrew)
2. (South Africa) Natalie Grandin / (Czech Republic) Vladimíra Uhlířová (semifinals)
3. (Zimbabwe) Cara Black / (New Zealand) Marina Erakovic (final)
4. (Japan) Kimiko Date-Krumm / (South Africa) Chanelle Scheepers (champions)

== Draw ==
=== Key ===
- Q = Qualifier
- WC = Wild card
- LL = Lucky loser
- Alt = Alternate
- SE = Special exempt
- PR = Protected ranking
- ITF = ITF entry
- JE = Junior exempt
- w/o = Walkover
- r = Retired
- d = Defaulted
- SR = Special ranking

=== Draw ===
First round
1	(Slovakia) D Hantuchová (Czech Republic) L Hradecká
(Canada) E Bouchard (Belarus) P Pekhova	w/o
(Germany) K Barrois (Ukraine) I Buryachok	6	6
(Switzerland) C Perrin (Slovenia) M Zec Peškirič	0	1
3	(Zimbabwe) C Black (New Zealand) M Erakovic	7^{7}	6
(Serbia) V Dolonc (Georgia (country)) A Tatishvili	6^{4}	4
(Italy) N Clerico (Poland) J Jegiołka	2	0
(Poland) M Linette (Poland) K Piter	6	6
WC	(France) C Garcia (France) M Johansson	4	1
(United States) C McHale (United States) M Moulton-Levy	6	6
WC	(France) C Feuerstein (Switzerland) L Michel	3	3
4	(Japan) K Date-Krumm (South Africa) C Scheepers	6	6
(Germany) T Maria (Austria) T Paszek	6	6
(United States) A Muhammad (United States) A Will	2	1
Alt	(Poland) M Domachowska (Spain) MT Torró Flor	1	3
2	(South Africa) N Grandin (Czech Republic) V Uhlířová	6	6

Quarterfinals
(Canada) E Bouchard (Belarus) P Pekhova	6^{3}	6	[7]
(Germany) K Barrois (Ukraine) I Buryachok	7^{7}	4	[10]
3	(Zimbabwe) C Black (New Zealand) M Erakovic	6	6
(Poland) M Linette (Poland) K Piter	3	4
(United States) C McHale (United States) M Moulton-Levy	2	6	[10]
4	(Japan) K Date-Krumm (South Africa) C Scheepers	6	1	[12]
(Germany) T Maria (Austria) T Paszek	6	4	[2]
2	(South Africa) N Grandin (Czech Republic) V Uhlířová	1	6	[10]

Semifinals
(Germany) K Barrois (Ukraine) I Buryachok	7	0	[9]
3	(Zimbabwe) C Black (New Zealand) M Erakovic	5	6	[11]
4	(Japan) K Date-Krumm (South Africa) C Scheepers	6	6
2	(South Africa) N Grandin (Czech Republic) V Uhlířová	1	3

Final
3	(Zimbabwe) C Black (New Zealand) M Erakovic	4	6	[12]
4	(Japan) K Date-Krumm (South Africa) C Scheepers	6	3	[14]
