= 2015 Internationaux de Strasbourg =

Women's tennis tournament

- Date: 17 – 23 May
- Edition: 29th
- Category: WTA International tournaments
- Draw: 32S / 16D
- Prize money: $250,000
- Surface: Clay
- Location: Strasbourg, France
- Venue: Tennis Club de Strasbourg

Champions

Singles
- (Australia) Samantha Stosur

Doubles
- (Chinese Taipei) Chuang Chia-jung / (China) Liang Chen
- Internationaux de Strasbourg

The 2015 Internationaux de Strasbourg was a professional tennis tournament played on clay courts. It was the 29th edition of the tournament and will be part of the International-level tournament category of the 2015 WTA Tour. It took place in Strasbourg, France, on 17–23 May 2015.

== Points and prize money ==
=== Point distribution ===
Event	W	F	SF	QF	Round of 16	Round of 32	Q	Q2	Q1
Women's singles	280	180	110	60	30	1	18	12	1
Women's doubles	280	180	110	60	1	—N/a	—N/a	—N/a	—N/a

=== Prize money ===
Event	W	F	SF	QF	Round of 16	Round of 32	Q2	Q1
Women's singles	€34,677	€17,258	€9,274	€4,980	€2,742	€1,694	€823	€484
Women's doubles	€9,919	€5,161	€2,770	€1,468	€774	—N/a	—N/a	—N/a

== Singles main draw entrants ==
=== Seeds ===
Country	Player	Rank^{1}	Seed
USA	Madison Keys	17	1
SRB	Jelena Janković	20	2
AUS	Samantha Stosur	27	3
FRA	Alizé Cornet	28	4
KAZ	Zarina Diyas	34	5
USA	Coco Vandeweghe	35	6
USA	Madison Brengle	36	7
GER	Mona Barthel	38	8

- ^{1} Rankings as of May 11, 2015.

=== Other entrants ===
The following players received wildcards into the singles main draw:

- (Serbia) Jelena Janković
- (France) Virginie Razzano
- (Italy) Francesca Schiavone
- (Australia) Samantha Stosur

The following players received entry from the qualifying draw:

- (Canada) Gabriela Dabrowski
- (Belarus) Olga Govortsova
- (Chinese Taipei) Hsieh Su-wei
- (Ukraine) Nadiia Kichenok
- (United States) Varvara Lepchenko
- (China) Wang Qiang

The following player received entry as a lucky loser:

- (France) Océane Dodin

=== Withdrawals ===
Before the tournament

- (Australia) Casey Dellacqua →replaced by Shelby Rogers
- (Australia) Jarmila Gajdošová →replaced by Lauren Davis
- (Germany) Julia Görges →replaced by Océane Dodin
- (Slovakia) Daniela Hantuchová →replaced by Irina Falconi
- (Estonia) Kaia Kanepi →replaced by Zheng Saisai
- (Sweden) Johanna Larsson →replaced by Pauline Parmentier
- (China) Peng Shuai →replaced by Aleksandra Krunić

During the tournament

- (United States) Madison Keys
- (Ukraine) Lesia Tsurenko

=== Retirements ===
- (Germany) Mona Barthel
- (Belarus) Olga Govortsova
- (Serbia) Jelena Janković

== Doubles main draw entrants ==
=== Seeds ===
Country	Player	Country	Player	Rank^{1}	Seed
TPE	Chuang Chia-jung	CHN	Liang Chen	133	1
UKR	Nadiia Kichenok	CHN	Zheng Saisai	161	2
USA	Raquel Kops-Jones	USA	Taylor Townsend	163	3
GBR	Jocelyn Rae	GBR	Anna Smith	172	4

- ^{1} Rankings as of May 11, 2015.

=== Other entrants ===
The following pair received a wildcard into the doubles main draw:

- (Poland) Agata Barańska / (France) Victoria Muntean

== Champions ==
=== Singles ===
- (Australia) Samantha Stosur def. (France) Kristina Mladenovic, 3–6, 6–2, 6–3

=== Doubles ===
- (Chinese Taipei) Chuang Chia-jung / (China) Liang Chen def. (Ukraine) Nadiia Kichenok / (China) Zheng Saisai, 4–6, 6–4, [12–10]
