= 2014 Internationaux de Strasbourg – Doubles =

Doubles
- 2014 Internationaux de Strasbourg

Final
- Champions: (Australia) Ashleigh Barty (Australia) Casey Dellacqua
- Runners-up: (Argentina) Tatiana Búa (Chile) Daniela Seguel
- Score: 4–6, 7–5, [10–4]

Events
Singles	Doubles
← 2013 ·	Internationaux de Strasbourg	· 2015 →

Kimiko Date-Krumm and Chanelle Scheepers were the defending champions but chose not to participate this year.
Ashleigh Barty and Casey Dellacqua won the title, defeating Tatiana Búa and Daniela Seguel in the final, 4–6, 7–5, [10–4].

== Seeds ==
1. (United States) Raquel Kops-Jones / (United States) Abigail Spears (first round)
2. (Australia) Ashleigh Barty / (Australia) Casey Dellacqua (champions)
3. (Chinese Taipei) Chan Hao-ching / (Chinese Taipei) Chan Yung-jan (semifinals)
4. (Croatia) Darija Jurak / (United States) Megan Moulton-Levy (quarterfinals)

== Draw ==
=== Key ===
- Q = Qualifier
- WC = Wild card
- LL = Lucky loser
- Alt = Alternate
- SE = Special exempt
- PR = Protected ranking
- ITF = ITF entry
- JE = Junior exempt
- w/o = Walkover
- r = Retired
- d = Defaulted
- SR = Special ranking

=== Draw ===
First round
1	(United States) R Kops-Jones (United States) A Spears	4	3
(France) A Hesse (France) K Mladenovic	6	6
(Italy) N Clerico (Czech Republic) N Fraňková	1	0
(Belarus) O Govortsova (Poland) K Jans-Ignacik	6	6
4	(Croatia) D Jurak (United States) M Moulton-Levy	6	6
(Ukraine) I Buryachok (Czech Republic) V Uhlířová	3	3
(Argentina) T Búa (Chile) D Seguel	6	2	[10]
WC	(France) C Feuerstein (France) A Lim	2	6	[8]
(Canada) F Abanda (Poland) A Rosolska	3	7^{8}	[10]
(Japan) M Doi (China) Y Xu	6	6^{6}	[7]
WC	(Germany) T Maria (Argentina) P Ormaechea	3	2
3	(Chinese Taipei) H-c Chan (Chinese Taipei) Y-j Chan	6	6
(Slovenia) A Klepač (Spain) MT Torró Flor	7^{7}	2	[7]
(Croatia) M Lučić-Baroni (Luxembourg) M Minella	6^{4}	6	[10]
Alt	(Netherlands) D Schuurs (Netherlands) E Wacanno	1	5
2	(Australia) A Barty (Australia) C Dellacqua	6	7

Quarterfinals
(France) A Hesse (France) K Mladenovic	2	5
(Belarus) O Govortsova (Poland) K Jans-Ignacik	6	7
4	(Croatia) D Jurak (United States) M Moulton-Levy	1	6	[5]
(Argentina) T Búa (Chile) D Seguel	6	1	[10]
(Canada) F Abanda (Poland) A Rosolska	5	5
3	(Chinese Taipei) H-c Chan (Chinese Taipei) Y-j Chan	7	7
(Croatia) M Lučić-Baroni (Luxembourg) M Minella	2	4
2	(Australia) A Barty (Australia) C Dellacqua	6	6

Semifinals
(Belarus) O Govortsova (Poland) K Jans-Ignacik	3	7^{7}	[8]
(Argentina) T Búa (Chile) D Seguel	6	6^{5}	[10]
3	(Chinese Taipei) H-c Chan (Chinese Taipei) Y-j Chan	6	6^{4}	[5]
2	(Australia) A Barty (Australia) C Dellacqua	1	7^{7}	[10]

Final
(Argentina) T Búa (Chile) D Seguel	6	5	[4]
2	(Australia) A Barty (Australia) C Dellacqua	4	7	[10]
