= 2015 Internationaux de Strasbourg – Singles =

Singles
- 2015 Internationaux de Strasbourg

Final
- Champion: (Australia) Samantha Stosur
- Runner-up: (France) Kristina Mladenovic
- Score: 3–6, 6–2, 6–3

Details
- Seeds: 8

Events
Singles	Doubles
- Internationaux de Strasbourg

The singles tennis tournament at the 2015 Internationaux de Strasbourg took place in Strasbourg, France, as part of the 2015 WTA Tour.

Monica Puig was the defending champion, but lost in the first round to Samantha Stosur. Third-seeded Stosur went on to win the title, defeating Kristina Mladenovic in the final, 3–6, 6–2, 6–3.

== Seeds ==
1. (United States) Madison Keys (quarterfinals, withdrew)
2. (Serbia) Jelena Janković (quarterfinals, retired)
3. (Australia) Samantha Stosur (champion)
4. (France) Alizé Cornet (second round)
5. (Kazakhstan) Zarina Diyas (first round)
6. (United States) Coco Vandeweghe (second round)
7. (United States) Madison Brengle (first round)
8. (Germany) Mona Barthel (first round, retired)

== Draw ==
Key

- Q = Qualifier
- WC = Wild card
- LL = Lucky loser
- Alt = Alternate
- ITF = ITF entry
- PR = Protected ranking
- SR = Special ranking
- SE = Special exempt
- JE = Junior exempt
- JR = Junior Accelerator Programme entrant
- CO = College Accelerator Programme entrant
- NG = Next Gen Accelerator Program entrant
- w/o = Walkover
- r = Retired
- d = Defaulted

=== Finals ===
Semifinals
(France) Kristina Mladenovic	6	1
WC	(France) Virginie Razzano	3	2^{r}
3/WC	(Australia) Samantha Stosur	6	3	6
(United States) Sloane Stephens	3	6	0

Final
(France) Kristina Mladenovic	6	2	3
3/WC	(Australia) Samantha Stosur	3	6	6

=== Top half ===
First round
1	(United States) M Keys	6	6
(United States) C McHale	4	3
(Croatia) M Lučić-Baroni	1
Q	(Belarus) O Govortsova	2^{r}
(France) K Mladenovic	6	4	6
(France) P Parmentier	2	6	1
(United States) A Riske	7	4	6
5	(Kazakhstan) Z Diyas	5	6	1
4	(France) A Cornet	6	6
Q	(China) Q Wang	3	3
(Russia) E Vesnina	6	6
Q	(Canada) G Dabrowski	4	2
WC	(Italy) F Schiavone	6	6
(United States) L Davis	4	1
WC	(France) V Razzano	6	5
8	(Germany) M Barthel	2	5^{r}

Second round
1	(United States) M Keys	4	7^{7}	7^{7}
(Croatia) M Lučić-Baroni	6	6^{3}	6^{0}
(France) K Mladenovic	7^{7}	6
(United States) A Riske	6^{4}	2
4	(France) A Cornet	6	0	3
(Russia) E Vesnina	3	6	6
WC	(Italy) F Schiavone	2	3
WC	(France) V Razzano	6	6

Quarterfinals
1	(United States) M Keys
(France) K Mladenovic	w/o
(Russia) E Vesnina	6	1	1
WC	(France) V Razzano	4	6	6

Semifinals
(France) K Mladenovic	6	1
WC	(France) V Razzano	3	2^{r}

=== Bottom half ===
First round
7	(United States) M Brengle	1	1
(Croatia) A Tomljanović	6	6
(Serbia) A Krunić	1	1
(United States) S Rogers	6	6
(Ukraine) L Tsurenko	6	7^{7}
Q	(United States) V Lepchenko	4	6^{4}
(Puerto Rico) M Puig	0	3
3/WC	(Australia) S Stosur	6	6
6	(United States) C Vandeweghe	7^{7}	7
LL	(France) O Dodin	6^{3}	5
Q	(Ukraine) N Kichenok	3	0
(United States) S Stephens	6	6
(China) S Zheng	6	0	6
Q	(Chinese Taipei) S-w Hsieh	4	6	2
(United States) I Falconi	6^{6}	3
2/WC	(Serbia) J Janković	7^{8}	6

Second round
(Croatia) A Tomljanović	7^{8}	3	6
(United States) S Rogers	6^{6}	6	2
(Ukraine) L Tsurenko
3/WC	(Australia) S Stosur	w/o
6	(United States) C Vandeweghe	3	4
(United States) S Stephens	6	6
(China) S Zheng	3	3
2/WC	(Serbia) J Janković	6	6

Quarterfinals
(Croatia) A Tomljanović	4	6	4
3/WC	(Australia) S Stosur	6	3	6
(United States) S Stephens	6	0
2/WC	(Serbia) J Janković	1	0^{r}

Semifinals
3/WC	(Australia) S Stosur	6	3	6
(United States) S Stephens	3	6	0

== Qualifying ==
=== Seeds ===
The top two seeds and Océane Dodin received a bye into the qualifying competition.

1. (United States) Varvara Lepchenko (qualified)
2. (China) Wang Qiang (qualified)
3. (Belarus) Olga Govortsova (qualified)
4. (Russia) Alla Kudryavtseva (withdrew, still playing in Rome)
5. (Chinese Taipei) Hsieh Su-wei (qualified)
6. (United States) Taylor Townsend (first round)
7. (United States) Anna Tatishvili (first round)
8. (France) Océane Dodin (qualifying competition, lucky loser)
9. (China) Zhang Kailin (qualifying competition)
10. (Japan) Risa Ozaki (qualifying competition)
11. (Japan) Hiroko Kuwata (first round)
12. (Canada) Gabriela Dabrowski (qualified)
13. (Poland) Katarzyna Piter (qualifying competition)

=== Qualifiers ===
1. (United States) Varvara Lepchenko
2. (China) Wang Qiang
3. (Belarus) Olga Govortsova
4. (Canada) Gabriela Dabrowski
5. (Chinese Taipei) Hsieh Su-wei
6. (Ukraine) Nadiia Kichenok

=== Lucky losers ===
1. (France) Océane Dodin

=== Draw ===
==== First qualifier ====
First round				Qualifying competition
				1	(United States) Varvara Lepchenko	6	6
	(France) Constance Sibille	6	6		(France) Constance Sibille	3	0
11	(Japan) Hiroko Kuwata	1	2

==== Second qualifier ====
First round				Qualifying competition
				2	(China) Wang Qiang	7	6
	(Germany) Laura Schaeder	6^{3}	4	9	(China) Zhang Kailin	5	3
9	(China) Zhang Kailin	7^{7}	6

==== Third qualifier ====
First round
3	(Belarus) Olga Govortsova	6	6
WC	(France) Margot Decker	1	1
(United States) Asia Muhammad	4	7^{8}	6
7	(United States) Anna Tatishvili	6	6^{6}	2

Qualifying competition
3	(Belarus) Olga Govortsova	6	6
(United States) Asia Muhammad	2	2

==== Fourth qualifier ====
First round
13	(Poland) Katarzyna Piter	6	6
(Canada) Françoise Abanda	3	3
(France) Irina Ramialison	4	2
12	(Canada) Gabriela Dabrowski	6	6

Qualifying competition
13	(Poland) Katarzyna Piter	6	2	3
12	(Canada) Gabriela Dabrowski	1	6	6

==== Fifth qualifier ====
First round				Qualifying competition
5	(Chinese Taipei) Hsieh Su-wei	6	6
WC	(France) Sarah Finck	0	3	5	(Chinese Taipei) Hsieh Su-wei	7	7
				8	(France) Océane Dodin	5	5

==== Sixth qualifier ====
First round
6	(United States) Taylor Townsend	4	1
(Ukraine) Nadiia Kichenok	6	6
WC	(France) Lou Brouleau	6	4	0
10	(Japan) Risa Ozaki	2	6	6

Qualifying competition
(Ukraine) Nadiia Kichenok	6	6
10	(Japan) Risa Ozaki	3	4
