= 2014 Internationaux de Strasbourg =

- Date: 19–24 May
- Edition: 28th
- Category: WTA International tournaments
- Draw: 32S / 16D
- Prize money: $250,000
- Surface: Clay
- Location: Strasbourg, France
- Venue: Tennis Club de Strasbourg

Champions

Singles
- (Puerto Rico) Monica Puig

Doubles
- (Australia) Ashleigh Barty / (Australia) Casey Dellacqua
← 2013 ·	Internationaux de Strasbourg	· 2015 →

The 2014 Internationaux de Strasbourg was a professional tennis tournament played on clay courts. It was the 28th edition of the tournament and was part of the International-level tournament category of the 2014 WTA Tour. It took place in Strasbourg, France, on 19–24 May 2014.

== Finals ==
=== Singles ===
- (Puerto Rico) Monica Puig defeated (Spain) Silvia Soler Espinosa 6–4, 6–3

=== Doubles ===
- (Australia) Ashleigh Barty / (Australia) Casey Dellacqua defeated (Argentina) Tatiana Búa / (Chile) Daniela Seguel 4–6, 7–5, [10–4]

== Points and prize money ==
=== Point distribution ===
Event	W	F	SF	QF	Round of 16	Round of 32	Q	Q3	Q2	Q1
Singles	280	180	110	60	30	1	18	14	10	1
Doubles	280	180	110	60	1	—	—	—	—	—

=== Prize money ===
Event	W	F	SF	QF	Round of 16	Round of 32	Q3	Q2	Q1
Singles	€34,677	€17,258	€9,113	€4,758	€2,669	€1,552	€810	€589	€427
Doubles	€9,919	€5,161	€2,770	€1,468	€774	—	—	—	—

== Singles main draw entrants ==
=== Seeds ===
Country	Player	Rank^{1}	Seed
USA	Sloane Stephens	16	1
FRA	Alizé Cornet	21	2
BEL	Kirsten Flipkens	23	3
GER	Andrea Petkovic	28	4
RUS	Elena Vesnina	33	5
SRB	Bojana Jovanovski	37	6
CHN	Peng Shuai	39	7
USA	Alison Riske	44	8

- ^{1} Rankings as of 12 May 2014

=== Other entrants ===
The following players received wildcards into the singles main draw:

- (France) Claire Feuerstein
- (France) Pauline Parmentier
- (United States) Sloane Stephens

The following players received entry from the qualifying draw:

- (Australia) Ashleigh Barty
- (Belarus) Olga Govortsova
- (Croatia) Mirjana Lučić-Baroni
- (Spain) Silvia Soler Espinosa

=== Withdrawals ===
Before the tournament

- (Bulgaria) Tsvetana Pironkova → replaced by (France) Kristina Mladenovic
- (United Kingdom) Laura Robson → replaced by (Switzerland) Stefanie Vögele
- (Slovakia) Magdaléna Rybáriková → replaced by (France) Virginie Razzano
- (Italy) Francesca Schiavone → replaced by (Canada) Sharon Fichman
- (China) Zhang Shuai → replaced by (Kazakhstan) Zarina Diyas

=== Retirements ===
- (Kazakhstan) Zarina Diyas (right hamstring strain)

== Doubles main draw entrants ==
=== Seeds ===
Country	Player	Country	Player	Rank^{1}	Seed
USA	Raquel Kops-Jones	USA	Abigail Spears	30	1
AUS	Ashleigh Barty	AUS	Casey Dellacqua	35	2
TPE	Chan Hao-ching	TPE	Chan Yung-jan	94	3
CRO	Darija Jurak	USA	Megan Moulton-Levy	105	4

- ^{1} Rankings as of 12 May 2014

=== Other entrants ===
The following pairs received wildcards into the doubles main draw:

- (France) Claire Feuerstein / (France) Alizé Lim
- (Germany) Tatjana Maria / (Argentina) Paula Ormaechea

The following pair received entry as alternates:

- (Netherlands) Demi Schuurs / (Netherlands) Eva Wacanno

=== Withdrawals ===
During the tournament

- (United States) Anna Tatishvili (left ankle injury)
