= Lara Michel =

Swiss tennis player

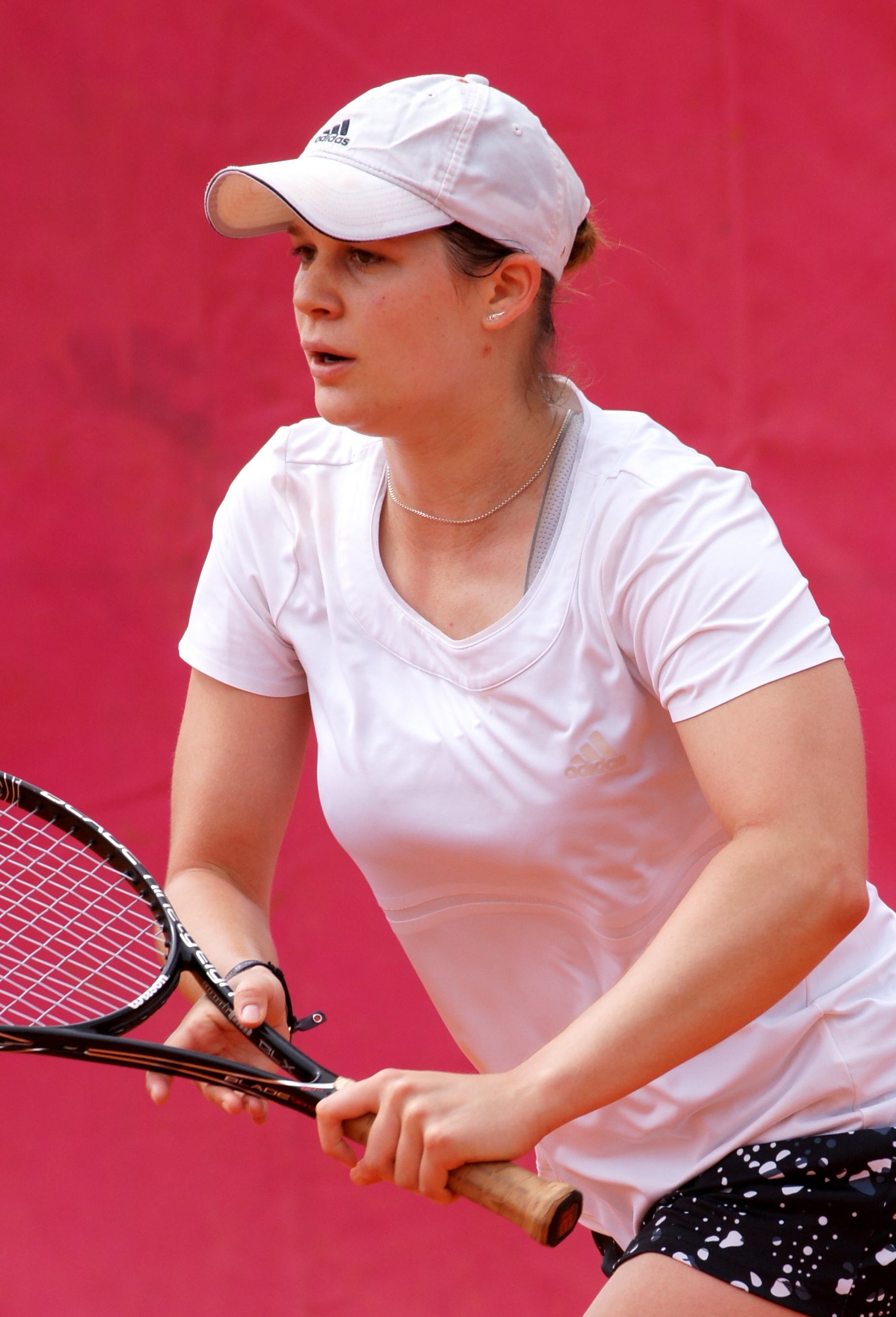
- 2015 Open de Cagnes-sur-Mer
- Country (sports): Switzerland
- Born: 24 December 1991 (age 33); Morges, Switzerland
- Height: 1.73 m (5 ft 8 in)
- Plays: Left-handed (one-handed backhand)
- Prize money: US$ 56,714

Singles
- Career record: 196–111
- Career titles: 8 ITF
- Highest ranking: No. 285 (13 October 2014)
- Current ranking: No. 1060 (25 December 2023)

Doubles
- Career record: 37–39
- Career titles: 2 ITF
- Highest ranking: No. 440 (21 February 2011)
- Last updated on: 25 December 2023.

Lara Michel (born 24 December 1991) is a Swiss tennis player.

Michel has won six singles and two doubles titles on the ITF Circuit in her career. On 13 October 2014, she reached her best singles ranking of world No. 285. On 21 February 2011, she peaked at No. 440 in the doubles rankings.

Michel made her WTA Tour debut at the 2013 Internationaux de Strasbourg, partnering Claire Feuerstein in doubles.

== ITF Circuit finals ==
=== Singles: 10 (8 titles, 2 runner–ups) ===
Legend $25,000 tournaments $10/15,000 tournaments	Finals by surface Hard (6–1) Clay (2–1)

Result	W–L	Date	Tournament	Tier	Surface	Opponent	Score
Loss	0–1	May 2010	ITF Galatina, Italy	10,000	Clay	(Germany) Anne Schäfer	6–4, 3–6, 1–6
Win	1–1	Nov 2010	GB Pro-Series Loughborough, UK	10,000	Hard (i)	(United Kingdom) Anna Fitzpatrick	6–2, 6–2
Loss	1–2	Jan 2011	ITF Saint Martin, France	10,000	Hard	(France) Céline Cattaneo	7–6^{(7)}, 4–6, 6–7^{(6)}
Win	2–2	Oct 2012	ITF Kalamata, Greece	10,000	Hard	(Liechtenstein) Kathinka von Deichmann	7–6^{(4)}, 0–6, 6–0
Win	3–2	Jan 2013	ITF Sharm El Sheikh, Egypt	10,000	Hard	(Czech Republic) Pernilla Mendesová	6–3, 4–6, 6–2
Win	4–2	Feb 2013	ITF Sharm El Sheikh, Egypt	10,000	Hard	(Serbia) Doroteja Erić	6–4, 3–6, 6–4
Win	5–2	May 2014	ITF Bol, Croatia	10,000	Clay	(Croatia) Adrijana Lekaj	6–3, 6–3
Win	6–2	May 2014	ITF Bol, Croatia	10,000	Clay	(Bulgaria) Viktoriya Tomova	6–4, 6–3
Win	7–2	Jun 2017	ITF Guimarães, Portugal	15,000	Hard	(Spain) Marta Huqi González Encinas	6–3, 6–1
Win	8–2	Feb 2019	ITF Monastir, Tunisia	15,000	Hard	(Romania) Miriam Bulgaru	6–2, 6–3

=== Doubles: 6 (2 titles, 5 runner–ups) ===
Legend $60,000 tournaments $25,000 tournaments $10/15,000 tournaments	Finals by surface Hard (1–2) Clay (1–2) Carpet (0–1)

Result	W–L	Date	Tournament	Tier	Surface	Partner	Opponents	Score
Win	1–0	Nov 2010	ITF Stockholm, Sweden	10,000	Hard (i)	(Switzerland) Xenia Knoll	(Denmark) Karen Barbat (Sweden) Anna Brazhnikova	6–3, 6–3
Loss	1–1	Jan 2011	ITF Saint Martin, France	10,000	Hard	(France) Céline Cattaneo	(United States) Elizabeth Lumpkin (Norway) Nina Munch-Søgaard	6–3, 4–6, [3–10]
Loss	1–2	Mar 2012	ITF Fällanden, Switzerland	10,000	Carpet (i)	(United Kingdom) Emily Webley-Smith	(Switzerland) Xenia Knoll (Switzerland) Amra Sadiković	7–6^{(3)}, 4–6, [10–12]
Loss	1–3	Aug 2012	ITF Pörtschach, Austria	10,000	Clay	(Switzerland) Tess Sugnaux	(Italy) Angelica Moratelli (Serbia) Milana Špremo	6–1, 4–6, [4–10]
Loss	1–4	Nov 2012	ITF Loughborough, United Kingdom	10,000	Hard (i)	(Denmark) Karen Barbat	(United Kingdom) Anna Fitzpatrick (United Kingdom) Jade Windley	2–6, 2–6
Win	2–4	Aug 2015	ITF Engis, Belgium	10,000	Clay	(Switzerland) Karin Kennel	(Belgium) Margaux Bovy (Belgium) Hélène Scholsen	6–0, 6–4
Loss	1–4	Sep 2023	ITF Fiano Romano, Italy	15,000	Clay	(Italy) Gaia Sanesi	(Italy) Enola Chiesa (Italy) Samira de Stefano	1–6, 4–6
