= Agata Barańska =

Polish tennis player (born 1993)

- Country (sports): Poland
- Born: 23 December 1993 (age 31)
- Plays: Right-handed (two-handed backhand)
- Prize money: $19,304

Singles
- Career record: 52–88
- Career titles: 0
- Highest ranking: No. 812 (11 June 2012)

Doubles
- Career record: 71–93
- Career titles: 4 ITF
- Highest ranking: No. 461 (28 September 2015)

Agata Barańska (born 23 December 1993) is a Polish former tennis player.

On 11 June 2012, she reached her best doubles ranking of world No. 461. In her career, she won four doubles titles at tournaments of the ITF Circuit. She is a Polish national champion in singles and doubles, as well as in mixed doubles.

Barańska made her WTA Tour main-draw debut at the 2015 Internationaux de Strasbourg in the doubles draw, partnering with Victoria Muntean.

== ITF Circuit finals ==
=== Doubles: 9 (4 titles, 5 runner-ups) ===
Legend $25,000 tournaments $15,000 tournaments $10,000 tournaments	Finals by surface Hard (2–2) Clay (1–3) Carpet (1–0)

Result	No.	Date	Tournament	Surface	Partner	Opponents	Score
Win	1.	23 July 2011	ITF Casablanca, Morocco	Clay	(Tunisia) Nour Abbès	(Mexico) Ximena Hermoso (Mexico) Ivette López	6–4, 6–2
Win	2.	2 June 2013	ITF Cantanhede, Portugal	Carpet	(Poland) Zuzanna Maciejewska	(Argentina) Aranza Salut (Argentina) Carolina Zeballos	6–7^{(4)}, 6–4, [12–10]
Loss	1.	16 September 2013	ITF Pula, Italy	Clay	(Austria) Pia König	(Netherlands) Quirine Lemoine (Netherlands) Gabriela van de Graaf	4–6, 7–6^{(10)}, [3–10]
Loss	2.	17 March 2014	ITF Heraklion, Greece	Hard	(Bulgaria) Vivian Zlatanova	(Slovakia) Petra Uberalová (Liechtenstein) Kathinka von Deichmann	5–7, 2–6
Win	3.	7 June 2014	ITF Sun City, South Africa	Hard	(United States) Stephanie Kent	(South Africa) Ilze Hattingh (South Africa) Madrie Le Roux	w/o
Win	4.	13 October 2014	ITF Antalya, Turkey	Hard	(France) Clothilde de Bernardi	(Germany) Katharina Hering (Netherlands) Jainy Scheepens	6–3, 6–3
Loss	3.	26 January 2015	ITF Antalya, Turkey	Clay	(France) Victoria Muntean	(Georgia (country)) Ekaterine Gorgodze (Georgia (country)) Sofia Kvatsabaia	2–6, 2–6
Loss	4.	3 April 2015	ITF Melbourne, Australia	Clay	(Poland) Sandra Zaniewska	(Australia) Priscilla Hon (Australia) Tammi Patterson	6–2, 4–6, [10–12]
Loss	5.	20 September 2015	ITF Antalya, Turkey	Hard	(China) Wang Yan	(South Africa) Ilze Hattingh (Slovakia) Chantal Škamlová	6–7^{(3)}, 6–3, [2–10]
