= Victoria Muntean =

French tennis player (born 1997)

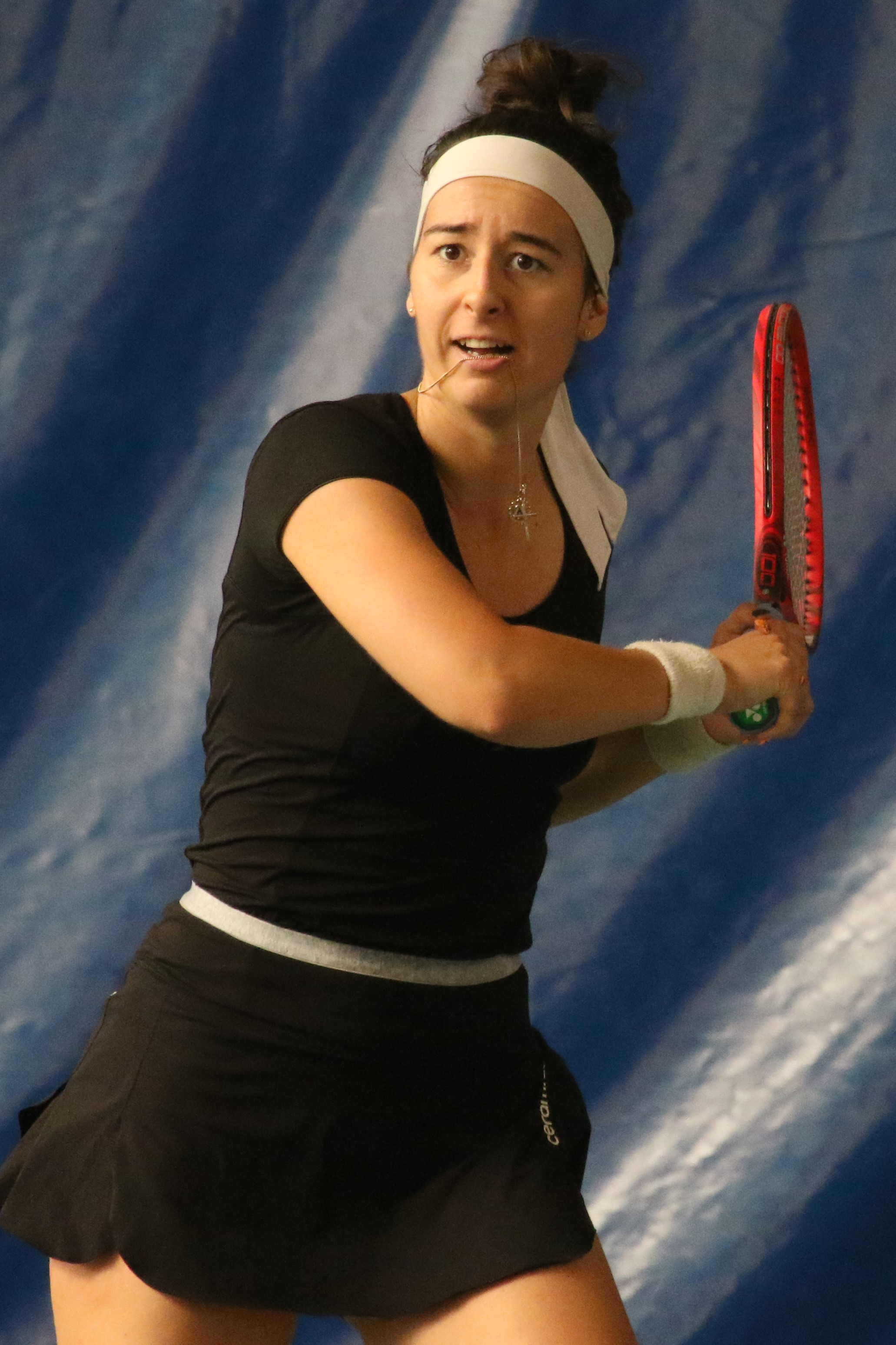
- Muntean at the 2021 ITF Poitiers
- Country (sports): France
- Residence: France
- Born: 23 January 1997 (age 28); Cirey-sur-Vezouze
- Plays: Right (two-handed backhand)
- Prize money: US$ 92,091

Singles
- Career record: 230–214
- Career titles: 3 ITF
- Highest ranking: No. 435 (27 June 2016)
- Current ranking: No. 887 (26 August 2024)

Doubles
- Career record: 152–153
- Career titles: 6 ITF
- Highest ranking: No. 381 (29 August 2022)
- Current ranking: No. 624 (26 August 2024)
- Last updated on: 28 August 2024.

Victoria Muntean (born 23 January 1997) is a French professional tennis player.

Muntean has a career-high WTA singles ranking of 435, attained on 27 June 2016, and a career-high WTA doubles ranking of 381, reached on 29 August 2022. She has won three singles titles and six doubles titles on the ITF Circuit.

== Career ==
Muntean made her WTA Tour doubles main-draw debut at the 2011 Internationaux de Strasbourg, partnering Dia Evtimova; they lost in the first round to the fourth-seeded pair of Akgul Amanmuradova and Chuang Chia-jung.

== ITF Circuit finals ==
=== Singles: 8 (3 titles, 5 runner–ups) ===
Legend
$10/15,000 tournaments

Result	W–L	Date	Tournament	Tier	Surface	Opponent	Score
Loss	0–1	Sep 2013	ITF Monastir, Tunisia	10,000	Hard	(Germany) Linda Prenkovic	1–6, 4–6
Win	1–1	Jul 2015	ITF Sharm El Sheikh, Egypt	10,000	Hard	(Italy) Giada Clerici	6–3, 3–6, 6–2
Loss	1–2	Aug 2015	ITF Sharm El Sheikh	10,000	Hard	(Egypt) Sandra Samir	1–6, 2–6
Win	2–2	Sep 2015	ITF Sharm El Sheikh	10,000	Hard	(China) Lu Jiaxi	6–1, 6–0
Loss	2–3	Jul 2016	ITF Sharm El Sheikh	10,000	Hard	(India) Dhruthi Tatachar Venugopal	6–7^{(6)}, 6–3, 3–6
Loss	2–4	Dec 2016	ITF Cairo, Egypt	10,000	Clay	(Russia) Veronica Miroshnichenko	6–1, 4–6, 6–7^{(5)}
Loss	2–5	Sep 2018	ITF Monastir, Tunisia	15,000	Hard	(Spain) Andrea Lázaro García	0–6, 2–6
Win	3–5	Jan 2020	ITF Monastir, Tunisia	15,000	Hard	(United Kingdom) Jodie Burrage	6–1, 0–6, 7–6^{(5)}

=== Doubles: 21 (6 titles, 15 runner–ups) ===
Legend
$40,000 tournaments
$25,000 tournaments
$10/15,000 tournaments

Result	W–L	Date	Tournament	Tier	Surface	Partnering	Opponents	Score
Loss	0–1	Sep 2014	ITF Clermont-Ferrand, France	25,000	Hard (i)	(France) Fanny Caramaro	(France) Irina Ramialison (Germany) Nina Zander	1–6, 0–6
Win	1–1	Oct 2014	ITF Stockholm, Sweden	10,000	Hard (i)	(Sweden) Anette Munozova	(Serbia) Tamara Čurović (Russia) Margarita Lazareva	2–6, 6–4, [10–8]
Loss	1–2	Feb 2015	ITF Antalya, Turkey	10,000	Clay	(Poland) Agata Barańska	(Georgia (country)) Ekaterine Gorgodze (Georgia (country)) Sofia Kvatsabaia	2–6, 2–6
Loss	1–3	Aug 2015	ITF Sharm El Sheikh, Egypt	10,000	Hard	(Sweden) Anette Munozova	(Russia) Kseniia Bekker (Russia) Elina Nepliy	2–6, 5–7
Win	2–3	Aug 2015	ITF Sharm El Sheikh	10,000	Hard	(Thailand) Kamonwan Buayam	(China) Wang Danni (China) Yu Yuanyi	7–5, 6–4
Win	3–3	Sep 2015	ITF Sharm El Sheikh	10,000	Hard	(Belgium) Britt Geukens	(Thailand) Kamonwan Buayam (Russia) Yana Sizikova	6–1, 3–6, [10–8]
Loss	3–4	Apr 2016	ITF Sharm El Sheikh	10,000	Hard	(Georgia (country)) Mariam Bolkvadze	(Ukraine) Oleksandra Korashvili (Russia) Margarita Lazareva	5–7, 3–6
Win	4–4	Jul 2016	ITF Sharm El Sheikh	10,000	Hard	(Switzerland) Karin Kennel	(Egypt) Ola Abou Zekry (India) Dhruthi Tatachar Venugopal	7–6^{(4)}, 2–6, [10–4]
Win	5–4	Dec 2016	ITF Rabat, Morocco	10,000	Clay	(Russia) Ksenia Laskutova	(Italy) Jessica Bertoldo (Italy) Sara Marcionni	6–1, 6–1
Loss	5–5	Jan 2017	ITF Hammamet, Tunisia	15,000	Clay	(China) Sun Xuliu	(Greece) Despina Papamichail (Brazil) Laura Pigossi	3–6, 6–4, [5–10]
Loss	5–6	Feb 2017	ITF Hammamet, Tunisia	15,000	Clay	(Chinese Taipei) Hsu Chieh-yu	(Italy) Giorgia Marchetti (Italy) Angelica Moratelli	6–2, 3–6, [8–10]
Loss	5–7	Apr 2017	ITF Dijon, France	15,000	Hard (i)	(Ukraine) Anastasia Zarycká	(Latvia) Diāna Marcinkēviča (Switzerland) Rebeka Masarova	4–6, 3–6
Loss	5–8	Jun 2017	ITF Hammamet, Tunisia	15,000	Clay	(Germany) Julia Wachaczyk	(Slovakia) Barbara Kötelesová (Sweden) Kajsa Rinaldo Persson	6–7^{(5)}, 6–4, [7–10]
Loss	5–9	Dec 2017	ITF Hammamet	15,000	Clay	(Bulgaria) Isabella Shinikova	(Italy) Claudia Giovine (Italy) Giorgia Marchetti	3–6, 1–6
Win	6–9	Jan 2018	ITF Hammamet, Tunisia	15,000	Clay	(Chinese Taipei) Hsu Chieh-yu	(Russia) Maria Marfutina (Romania) Ioana Loredana Roșca	3–6, 7–5, [10–5]
Loss	6–10	Mar 2018	ITF Antalya, Turkey	15,000	Clay	(Romania) Ilona Georgiana Ghioroaie	(Sweden) Fanny Östlund (Romania) Andreea Roșca	3–6, 6–4, [7–10]
Loss	6–11	Jun 2018	ITF Hong Kong	25,000	Hard	(India) Pranjala Yadlapalli	(Chinese Taipei) Lee Pei-chi (Indonesia) Jessy Rompies	3–6, 4–6
Loss	6–12	Aug 2019	ITF Kiryat Shmona, Israel	25,000	Hard	(Germany) Natalia Siedliska	(Israel) Shavit Kimchi (Israel) Maya Tahan	6–4, 4–6, [10–12]
Loss	6–13	Sep 2020	ITF Marbella, Spain	25,000	Clay	(Romania) Miriam Bulgaru	(Russia) Alina Charaeva (Russia) Oksana Selekhmeteva	3–6, 2–6
Loss	6–14	Apr 2022	ITF Monastir, Tunisia	15,000	Hard	(Hungary) Rebeka Stolmár	(China) Wang Meiling (China) Yao Xinxin	2–6, 6–4, [3–10]
Loss	6–15	Sep 2023	ITF Saint-Palais-sur-Mer, France	40,000	Clay	(India) Vasanti Shinde	(United Kingdom) Emily Appleton (Ukraine) Valeriya Strakhova	1–6, 2–6
