= Anastasia Pavlyuchenkova career statistics =

Career finals
Discipline	Type	Won	Lost	Total
Singles	Grand Slam	0	1	1
Singles	Summer Olympics	–	–	–
Singles	WTA Finals (Note: Formerly known as WTA Tour Championships until 2014.)	–	–	–
Singles	WTA 1000 (Note: The WTA Tier I tournaments were reclassified as Premier Mandatory & 5 in 2009 and later as WTA 1000 tournaments in 2021.)	–	–	–
Singles	WTA 500 & 250 (Note: In 2009, the WTA Tier II tournaments were reclassified as WTA Premier tournaments, while the WTA Tier III tournaments, WTA Tier IV tournaments and WTA Tier V tournaments were reclassified as WTA International tournaments. In 2021, the Premier tournaments were reclassified as WTA 500 tournaments and International as WTA 250 tournaments.)	12	8	20
Singles	Total	12	9	21
Doubles	Grand Slam	–	–	–
Doubles	Summer Olympics	–	–	–
Doubles	WTA Finals	–	–	–
Doubles	WTA 1000	2	0	2
Doubles	WTA 500 & 250	4	4	8
Doubles	Total	6	4	10
Mixed doubles	Grand Slam	–	–	–
Mixed doubles	Summer Olympics	1	0	1
Mixed doubles	Total	1	0	1
Total		19	13	32

This is a list of career statistics of Russian tennis player Anastasia Pavlyuchenkova. To date, Pavlyuchenkova has won twelve WTA singles titles (finishing runner-up in nine other finals) and six WTA doubles titles (including two WTA 1000 titles), as well as five titles in singles and eight in doubles on the ITF Circuit. She has reached one Grand Slam singles final at the 2021 French Open, as well as an additional fifteen quarterfinals (nine in singles and six in doubles) across all four major tournaments.

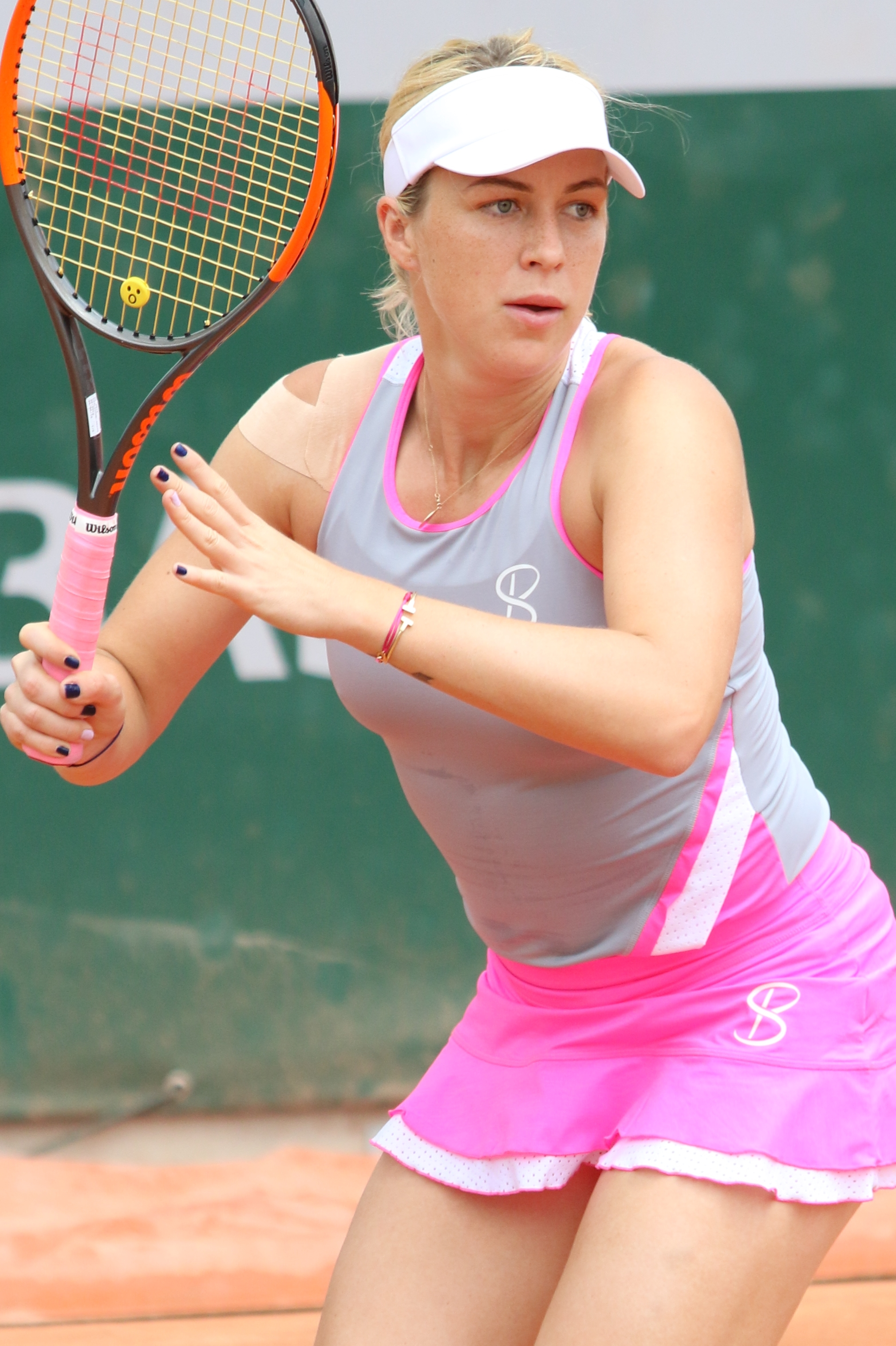
Pavlyuchenkova at the 2018 French Open.

== Performance timelines ==
Key
W	F	SF	QF	#R	RR	Q#	P#	DNQ	A	Z#	PO	G	S	B	NMS	NTI	P	NH

(W) winner; (F) finalist; (SF) semifinalist; (QF) quarterfinalist; (#R) rounds 4, 3, 2, 1; (RR) round-robin stage; (Q#) qualification round; (P#) preliminary round; (DNQ) did not qualify; (A) absent; (Z#) Davis/Fed Cup Zonal Group (with number indication) or (PO) play-off; (G) gold, (S) silver or (B) bronze Olympic/Paralympic medal; (NMS) not a Masters tournament; (NTI) not a Tier I tournament; (P) postponed; (NH) not held; (SR) strike rate (events won / competed); (W–L) win–loss record.
To avoid confusion and double counting, these charts are updated at the conclusion of a tournament or when the player's participation has ended.

Only main-draw results in WTA Tour, Grand Slam tournaments, Fed Cup/Billie Jean King Cup, United Cup, Hopman Cup and Olympic Games are included in win–loss records.

=== Singles ===
Current after the 2026 Madrid Open.

Tournament	2006	2007	2008	2009	2010	2011	2012	2013	2014	2015	2016	2017	2018	2019	2020	2021	2022	2023	2024	2025	2026	SR	W–L	Win %
Grand Slam tournaments
Australian Open	A	Q3	Q2	1R	2R	3R	2R	1R	3R	1R	1R	QF	2R	QF	QF	1R	3R	1R	2R	QF	1R	0 / 18	26–18	59%
French Open	A	A	2R	3R	3R	QF	3R	2R	2R	1R	3R	2R	2R	1R	2R	F	A	QF	2R	1R		0 / 17	29–17	63%
Wimbledon	A	1R	3R	2R	3R	2R	2R	1R	1R	2R	QF	1R	1R	1R	NH	3R	A (Note: Suspended due to the ban of Russian and Belarusian athletes in light of the Russian invasion of Ukraine.)	A	2R	QF		0 / 16	19–16	54%
US Open	A	Q2	2R	1R	4R	QF	2R	3R	2R	2R	3R	1R	1R	2R	A	4R	A	2R	3R	2R		0 / 16	23–16	59%
Win–loss	0–0	0–1	4–3	3–4	8–4	11–4	5–4	3–4	4–4	2–4	8–4	5–4	2–4	5–4	5–2	11–4	2–1	5–3	5–4	9–4	0–1	0 / 67	97–67	59%
Year-end championships
WTA Finals	DNQ															Alt/A	DNQ					0 / 0	0–0	0%
WTA Elite Trophy (Note: Tournament of Champions was held from 2009 to 2014, when WTA Elite Trophy replaced it.)	NH			DNQ	1R	DNQ		SF	DNQ			RR	DNQ	Alt	NH			DNQ	NH			0 / 3	3–4	43%
National representation
Billie Jean King Cup (Note: Formerly known as Fed Cup until 2020.)	A	A	A	SF	A	F	SF	F	A	F	A	PO	WG2	PO2	W (Note: Edition is split into the two years due to COVID-19.)		DQ					1 / 6	11–10	52%
Summer Olympics	NH		A	NH			A	NH			2R	NH				QF	NH		A	NH		0 / 2	4–2	67%
WTA 1000 + former
Qatar Open	NTI		A	NH		NTI	1R	A	2R	NTI	A	NTI	1R	NTI	A	NTI	A	NTI	SF	A	1R	0 / 5	5–5	31%
Dubai Championships	NTI			2R	QF	1R	NTI			1R	NTI	1R	NTI	1R	NTI	1R	NTI	1R	2R	1R	1R	0 / 11	5–10	33%
Indian Wells Open	A	A	A	SF	3R	3R	2R	2R	3R	3R	2R	QF	2R	2R	NH	3R	A	A	4R	A	A	0 / 13	16–13	55%
Miami Open	A	A	A	2R	4R	4R	2R	2R	2R	2R	2R	3R	3R	2R	NH	A	A	A	3R	1R	A	0 / 13	9–13	41%
Madrid Open	NH			1R	2R	QF	2R	1R	3R	3R	3R	1R	1R	1R	NH	SF	1R	2R	3R	1R	1R	0 / 17	16–17	48%
Italian Open	A	A	A	A	1R	3R	2R	1R	1R	2R	1R	3R	1R	1R	2R	A	1R	2R	2R	2R		0 / 15	9–15	38%
Canadian Open	A	A	A	Q1	1R	1R	1R	2R	1R	A	QF	2R	2R	2R	NH	2R	A	A	1R	1R		0 / 12	8–12	40%
Cincinnati Open	NTI			Q2	SF	1R	QF	1R	3R	QF	3R	1R	2R	Q1	A	A	A	1R	QF	1R		0 / 12	17–12	59%
Pan Pacific / Wuhan Open (Note: In 2014, the Pan Pacific Open was downgraded to a Premier event and replaced by the Wuhan Open. The Premier 5 tournaments were reclassified as WTA 1000 tournaments in 2021.)	A	A	A	3R	3R	2R	2R	1R	2R	2R	1R	1R	QF	1R	NH				A	A		0 / 11	11–11	50%
China Open	NTI			QF	1R	QF	1R	1R	1R	QF	1R	2R	1R	2R	NH			2R	A	A		0 / 12	10–12	45%
Kremlin Cup (former)	1R	Q1	A	NMS/NH																		0 / 1	0–1	0%
Win–loss	0–1	0–0	0–0	12–6	13–9	11–9	6–9	1–8	7–9	13–8	5–8	8–9	6–9	2–8	1–1	6–4	0–2	2–5	12–7	1–6	0–3	0 / 122	106–121	47%
Career statistics
	2006	2007	2008	2009	2010	2011	2012	2013	2014	2015	2016	2017	2018	2019	2020	2021	2022	2023	2024	2025	2026	SR	W–L	Win %
Tournaments	1	1	8	20	23	22	23	23	22	22	24	26	22	21	8	19	3	13	20	10	6	Career total: 337		
Titles	0	0	0	0	2	1	0	2	2	1	0	3	1	0	0	0	0	0	0	0	0	Career total: 12		
Finals	0	0	0	0	2	1	1	4	2	3	0	4	1	2	0	1	0	0	0	0	0	Career total: 21		
Hard win–loss	0–1	0–0	4–4	18–13	32–15	28–15	11–14	26–17	21–13	29–16	19–17	31–17	12–17	23–16	6–4	17–15	2–1	6–8	21–12	6–9	0–5	9 / 232	312–229	58%
Clay win–loss	0–0	0–0	4–3	4–6	5–4	10–4	7–9	7–5	4–5	4–6	3–4	8–4	9–5	3–4	3–4	10–3	0–2	8–4	3–5	1–3	0–1	3 / 78	93–81	53%
Grass win–loss	0–0	0–1	2–1	2–2	2–2	1–2	3–2	0–1	1–2	2–2	4–3	2–3	1–3	0–1	NH	2–2	0–0	0–0	1–2	7–2	0–0	0 / 30	30–31	49%
Overall win–loss	0–1	0–1	10–8	24–21	39–21	39–21	21–25	33–23	26–20	35–24	26–24	41–24	22–25	26–21	9–8	29–20	2–3	14–12	25–20	14–14	0–6	12 / 351	435–342	57%
Year-end ranking	402	281	45	41	21	16	36	26	25	28	28	15	42	30	38	11	367	59	30	47		$16,086,807		

=== Doubles ===
Current after the 2023 Madrid Open.

Tournament	2006	2007	2008	2009	2010	2011	2012	2013	2014	2015	2016	2017	2018	2019	2020	2021	2022	2023	SR	W–L	Win%
Grand Slam tournaments
Australian Open	A	A	A	1R	1R	1R	1R	QF	1R	3R	3R	3R	1R	1R	A	1R	A	3R	0 / 13	11–13	46%
French Open	A	A	A	3R	1R	2R	1R	QF	2R	2R	A	3R	2R	1R	2R	QF	A	A	0 / 12	15–12	56%
Wimbledon	A	A	A	2R	3R	1R	1R	1R	QF	3R	A	A	1R	A	NH	1R	A	A	0 / 9	8–9	47%
US Open	A	A	1R	1R	2R	2R	1R	3R	2R	QF	A	3R	QF	3R	A	A	A	1R	0 / 12	15–12	56%
Win–loss	0–0	0–0	0–1	3–4	3–4	2–4	0–4	8–4	5–3	8–4	2–1	6–3	4–4	2–3	1–1	3–3	0–0	2–2	0 / 46	49–46	52%
National representation
Billie Jean King Cup	A	A	A	SF	SF	F	SF	F	A	F	A	A	A	A	W (Note: Edition is split into the two years due to COVID-19.)				1 / 7	5–2	71%
WTA 1000
Dubai / Qatar Open (Note: The first Premier 5 event of the year has switched back and forth between the Dubai Tennis Championships and the Qatar Open since 2009. Dubai was classified as a Premier 5 event from 2009 to 2011 before being succeeded by Doha for the 2012–2014 period. In 2015, Dubai regained its Premier 5 status while Doha was demoted to Premier status. The Premier 5 tournaments were reclassified as WTA 1000 tournaments in 2021.)	NT1		A	A	1R	A	2R	A	SF	SF	A	1R	2R	A	A	1R	A	2R	0 / 8	8–7	53%
Indian Wells Open	A	A	A	A	A	QF	A	1R	2R	2R	1R	1R	1R	1R	NH	A	A	A	0 / 8	4–8	33%
Miami Open	A	A	A	2R	A	1R	QF	2R	2R	2R	1R	2R	1R	1R	NH	A	A	A	0 / 10	7–10	41%
Madrid Open	NH			A	A	A	2R	W	QF	2R	QF	1R	2R	1R	NH	SF	A	2R	1 / 10	15–7	68%
Italian Open	A	A	A	A	QF	A	A	A	A	SF	1R	1R	A	2R	A	A	W		1 / 5	11–4	73%
Canadian Open	A	A	A	A	A	1R	2R	1R	2R	A	1R	1R	1R	A	NH	A	A		0 / 7	2–7	22%
Cincinnati Open	NT1			A	2R	A	A	2R	QF	2R	A	2R	SF	A	A	A	A		0 / 6	9–6	60%
Pan Pacific Open / Wuhan Open (Note: In 2014, the Pan Pacific Open was downgraded to a Premier event and replaced by the Wuhan Open. The Premier 5 tournaments were reclassified as WTA 1000 tournaments in 2021.)	A	A	A	A	A	A	QF	A	1R	A	A	A	SF	A	NH				0 / 3	4–1	80%
China Open	NT1			QF	A	QF	A	2R	SF	2R	A	A	A	2R	NH				0 / 6	10–6	63%
Career statistics
Tournaments	1	0	7	9	14	13	14	15	18	17	10	15	15	9	3	7	1	4	Career total: 172		
Titles	0	0	1	0	0	1	1	1	0	0	0	1	0	0	0	0	1	0	Career total: 6		
Finals	0	0	2	0	0	1	1	1	0	1	0	1	0	1	0	0	1	1	Career total: 10		
Overall win–loss	1–1	0–0	9–6	8–9	12–12	14–11	13–12	21–13	17–16	29–17	8–9	14–13	13–14	6–7	2–3	8–7	5–0	7–2	6/ 171	186–152	55%
Year-end ranking	209	194	85	83	76	61	60	21	33	27	98	51	55	112	103	105	84				

== Grand Slam tournament finals ==
=== Singles: 1 (runner-up) ===
Result	Year	Tournament	Surface	Opponent	Score
Loss	2021	French Open	Clay	(Czech Republic) Barbora Krejčíková	1–6, 6–2, 4–6

== Other finals ==
=== Olympic Games ===
==== Mixed doubles: 1 (gold medal) ====
Result	Year	Tournament	Surface	Partner	Opponents	Score
Gold	2021	Summer Olympics, Tokyo	Hard	(Russia) Andrey Rublev	(Russia) Elena Vesnina (Russia) Aslan Karatsev	6–3, 6–7^{(5–7)}, [13–11]

=== WTA 1000 tournaments ===
==== Doubles: 2 (2 titles) ====
Result	Year	Tournament	Surface	Partner	Opponent	Score
Win	2013	Madrid Open	Clay	(Czech Republic) Lucie Šafářová	(Zimbabwe) Cara Black (New Zealand) Marina Erakovic	6–2, 6–4
Win	2022	Italian Open	Clay	Veronika Kudermetova	(Canada) Gabriela Dabrowski (Mexico) Giuliana Olmos	1–6, 6–4, [10–7]

== WTA Tour finals ==
=== Singles: 21 (12 titles, 9 runner-ups) ===
Legend Grand Slam (0–1) WTA 1000 (0–0) WTA 500 (2–5) WTA 250 (10–3)	Finals by surface Hard (9–8) Grass (0–0) Clay (3–1) Carpet (0–0)

Result	W–L	Date	Tournament	Tier	Surface	Opponent	Score
Win	1–0	Mar 2010	Monterrey Open, Mexico	International	Hard	(Slovakia) Daniela Hantuchová	1–6, 6–1, 6–0
Win	2–0	Aug 2010	İstanbul Cup, Turkey	International	Hard	(Russia) Elena Vesnina	5–7, 7–5, 6–4
Win	3–0	Mar 2011	Monterrey Open, Mexico (2)	International	Hard	(Serbia) Jelena Janković	2–6, 6–2, 6–3
Loss	3–1	Aug 2012	Washington Open, United States	International	Hard	(Slovakia) Magdaléna Rybáriková	1–6, 1–6
Loss	3–2	Jan 2013	Brisbane International, Australia	Premier	Hard	(United States) Serena Williams	2–6, 1–6
Win	4–2	Apr 2013	Monterrey Open, Mexico (3)	International	Hard	(Germany) Angelique Kerber	4–6, 6–2, 6–4
Win	5–2	May 2013	Estoril Open, Portugal	International	Clay	(Spain) Carla Suárez Navarro	7–5, 6–2
Loss	5–3	Sep 2013	Korea Open, South Korea	International	Hard	(Poland) Agnieszka Radwańska	7–6^{(8–6)}, 3–6, 4–6
Win	6–3	Feb 2014	Paris Indoor, France	Premier	Hard (i)	(Italy) Sara Errani	3–6, 6–2, 6–3
Win	7–3	Oct 2014	Kremlin Cup, Russia	Premier	Hard (i)	(Romania) Irina-Camelia Begu	6–4, 5–7, 6–1
Loss	7–4	Aug 2015	Washington Open, United States	International	Hard	(United States) Sloane Stephens	1–6, 2–6
Win	8–4	Oct 2015	Linz Open, Austria	International	Hard (i)	(Germany) Anna-Lena Friedsam	6–4, 6–3
Loss	8–5	Oct 2015	Kremlin Cup, Russia	Premier	Hard (i)	(Russia) Svetlana Kuznetsova	2–6, 1–6
Win	9–5	Apr 2017	Monterrey Open, Mexico (4)	International	Hard	(Germany) Angelique Kerber	6–4, 2–6, 6–1
Win	10–5	May 2017	Rabat Grand Prix, Morocco	International	Clay	(Italy) Francesca Schiavone	7–5, 7–5
Loss	10–6	Sep 2017	Pan Pacific Open, Japan	Premier	Hard	(Denmark) Caroline Wozniacki	0–6, 5–7
Win	11–6	Oct 2017	Hong Kong Open, China	International	Hard	(Australia) Daria Gavrilova	5–7, 6–3, 7–6^{(7–3)}
Win	12–6	May 2018	Internationaux de Strasbourg, France	International	Clay	(Slovakia) Dominika Cibulková	6–7^{(5–7)}, 7–6^{(7–3)}, 7–6^{(8–6)}
Loss	12–7	Sep 2019	Pan Pacific Open, Japan	Premier	Hard	(Japan) Naomi Osaka	2–6, 3–6
Loss	12–8	Oct 2019	Kremlin Cup, Russia	Premier	Hard (i)	(Switzerland) Belinda Bencic	6–3, 1–6, 1–6
Loss	12–9	Jun 2021	French Open, France	Grand Slam	Clay	(Czech Republic) Barbora Krejčíková	1–6, 6–2, 4–6

=== Doubles: 10 (6 titles, 4 runner-ups) ===
Legend
Grand Slam
WTA 1000 (2–0)
WTA 500 (2–2)
WTA 250 (2–2)

Result	W–L	Date	Tournament	Tier	Surface	Partner	Opponent	Score
Win	1–0	May 2008	Fez Grand Prix, Morocco	Tier IV	Clay	(Romania) Sorana Cîrstea	(Russia) Alisa Kleybanova (Russia) Ekaterina Makarova	6–2, 6–2
Loss	1–1	Jul 2008	Palermo Ladies Open, Italy	Tier IV	Clay	(Russia) Alla Kudryavtseva	(Spain) Nuria Llagostera Vives (Italy) Sara Errani	6–2, 6–7^{(1–7)}, [4–10]
Win	2–1	Jan 2011	Brisbane International, Australia	International	Hard	(Russia) Alisa Kleybanova	(Poland) Klaudia Jans (Poland) Alicja Rosolska	6–3, 7–5
Win	3–1	Apr 2012	Charleston Open, United States	Premier	Clay (green)	(Czech Republic) Lucie Šafářová	(Spain) Anabel Medina Garrigues (Kazakhstan) Yaroslava Shvedova	5–7, 6–4, [10–6]
Win	4–1	May 2013	Madrid Open, Spain	Premier M	Clay	(Czech Republic) Lucie Šafářová	(Zimbabwe) Cara Black (New Zealand) Marina Erakovic	6–2, 6–4
Loss	4–2	Jun 2015	Rosmalen Open, Netherlands	International	Grass	(Serbia) Jelena Janković	(United States) Asia Muhammad (Germany) Laura Siegemund	3–6, 5–7
Win	5–2	Jan 2017	Sydney International, Australia	Premier	Hard	(Hungary) Tímea Babos	(India) Sania Mirza (Czech Republic) Barbora Strýcová	6–4, 6–4
Loss	5–3	Apr 2019	Stuttgart Open, Germany	Premier	Clay (i)	(Czech Republic) Lucie Šafářová	(Germany) Mona Barthel (Germany) Anna-Lena Friedsam	6–2, 3–6, [6–10]
Win	6–3	May 2022	Italian Open, Italy	WTA 1000	Clay	Veronika Kudermetova	(Canada) Gabriela Dabrowski (Mexico) Giuliana Olmos	1–6, 6–4, [10–7]
Loss	6–4	Jan 2023	Adelaide International, Australia	WTA 250	Hard	(Kazakhstan) Elena Rybakina	(Brazil) Luisa Stefani (United States) Taylor Townsend	5–7, 6–7^{(3–7)}

== WTA Challenger finals ==
=== Singles: 1 (runner-up) ===
Result	W–L	Date	Tournament	Surface	Opponent	Score
Loss	0–1	Jul 2023	Contréxeville Open, France	Clay	(Netherlands) Arantxa Rus	3–6, 3–6

== ITF Circuit finals ==
=== Singles: 6 (5 titles, 1 runner-up) ===
Legend $100,000 tournaments (2–0) $25,000 tournaments (2–1) $10,000 tournaments (1–0)	Finals by surface Hard (3–0) Clay (1–0) Carpet (1–1)

Result	W–L	Date	Tournament	Tier	Surface	Opponent	Score
Win	1–0	May 2006	ITF Casale Monferrato, Italy	10,000	Clay	(Italy) Stefania Chieppa	3–6, 6–3, 6–4
Loss	1–1	Nov 2006	ITF Minsk, Belarus	25,000	Carpet (i)	(Russia) Evgeniya Rodina	4–6, 3–6
Win	2–1	Mar 2008	ITF Minsk, Belarus	25,000	Carpet (i)	(Czech Republic) Nikola Fraňková	6–0, 6–1
Win	3–1	Mar 2008	ITF Moscow, Russia	25,000	Hard (i)	(Belarus) Ekaterina Dzehalevich	6–0, 6–2
Win	4–1	Oct 2008	ITF Poitiers, France	100,000	Hard (i)	(France) Julie Coin	6–4, 6–3
Win	5–1	Oct 2008	Bratislava Open, Slovakia	100,000	Hard	(Netherlands) Michaëlla Krajicek	6–3, 6–1

=== Doubles: 10 (8 titles, 2 runner-ups) ===
Legend $100,000 tournaments (1–1) $75,000 tournaments (1–0) $50,000 tournaments (1–0) $25,000 tournaments (5–0) $10,000 tournaments (0–1)	Finals by surface Hard (8–0) Clay (0–2) Grass (0–0) Carpet (0–0)

Result	W–L	Date	Tournament	Tier	Surface	Partner	Opponents	Score
Win	1–0	Mar 2006	St. Petersburg Trophy, Russia	25,000	Hard (i)	(Russia) Yulia Solonitskaya	(Ukraine) Yuliya Beygelzimer (Russia) Alla Kudryavtseva	6–1, 6–4
Loss	1–1	May 2006	ITF Casale Monferrato, Italy	10,000	Clay	(Russia) Irina Smirnova	(Italy) Giulia Gatto-Monticone (Belarus) Darya Kustova	2–6, 2–6
Win	2–1	Oct 2006	ITF Podolsk, Russia	25,000	Hard (i)	(Russia) Evgeniya Rodina	(Russia) Vasilisa Davydova (Belarus) Ekaterina Dzehalevich	6–1, 6–2
Loss	2–2	Apr 2007	Open de Cagnes-sur-Mer, France	100,000	Clay	(Slovakia) Katarína Kachlíková	(France) Aurélie Védy (Switzerland) Timea Bacsinszky	5–7, 5–7
Win	3–2	Jul 2007	ITF Les Contamines, France	25,000	Hard	(Belgium) Yanina Wickmayer	(Czech Republic) Petra Cetkovská (Czech Republic) Sandra Záhlavová	w/o
Win	4–2	Nov 2007	ITF Minsk, Belarus	50,000	Hard	(Russia) Alla Kudryavtseva	(Serbia) Vesna Manasieva (Russia) Ekaterina Lopes	6–0, 6–2
Win	5–2	Nov 2007	Internationaux de Poitiers, France	100,000	Hard	(Russia) Alla Kudryavtseva	(Poland) Klaudia Jans-Ignacik (Poland) Alicja Rosolska	2–6, 6–4, [10–1]
Win	6–2	Mar 2008	St. Petersburg Trophy, Russia	25,000	Hard (i)	(Czech Republic) Nikola Fraňková	(Russia) Nina Bratchikova (Russia) Vasilisa Davydova	6–2, 6–2
Win	7–2	Mar 2008	ITF Moscow, Russia	25,000	Hard	(Czech Republic) Nikola Fraňková	(Russia) Marina Shamayko (Georgia (country)) Sofia Shapatava	6–3, 6–2
Win	8–2	Apr 2008	Torhout Open, Belgium	75,000	Hard	(Belgium) Yanina Wickmayer	(France) Stéphanie Cohen-Aloro (Tunisia) Selima Sfar	6–4, 4–6, [10–8]

== WTA rankings ==
Year	2006	2007	2008	2009	2010	2011	2012	2013	2014	2015	2016	2017	2018	2019	2020	2021	2022	2023	2024
Highest ranking	377	254	45	27	19	13	15	19	21	23	17	14	15	30	29	11	11	57	21
Lowest ranking	803	376	309	45	40	21	36	34	30	42	28	27	42	46	38	46	372	846	60
Year-end ranking	402	281	45	61	21	16	36	26	25	28	28	15	42	30	38	11	367	59	30

*as of 30 December 2024.

== WTA Tour career earnings ==
as of 13 January 2025

Year	Grand Slam singles titles	WTA singles titles	Total singles titles	Earnings ($)	Money list rank
2008	0	0	0	196,023	90
2009	0	0	0	498,107	41
2010	0	2	2	671,044	28
2011	0	1	1	916,239	19
2012	0	0	0	483,390	40
2013	0	2	2	930,910	27
2014	0	2	2	865,828	30
2015	0	1	1	868,869	37
2016	0	0	0	1,059,972	31
2017	0	3	3	1,419,052	26
2018	0	1	1	790,572	49
2019	0	0	0	1,023,739	43
2020	0	0	0	557,714	36
2021	0	0	0	1,730,375	14
2022	0	0	0	265,441	265
2023	0	0	0	827,881	51
2024	0	0	0	[]	
Career	0	12	12	14,458,539	43

== Grand Slam tournament seedings ==
Year	Australian Open	French Open	Wimbledon	US Open
2007	did not qualify	absent	wild card	did not qualify
2008	did not qualify	not seeded	not seeded	not seeded
2009	not seeded	27th	31st	not seeded
2010	not seeded	29th	29th	20th
2011	16th	14th	14th	17th
2012	15th	22nd	31st	17th
2013	24th	19th	21st	32nd
2014	29th	24th	26th	23rd
2015	23rd	not seeded	not seeded	31st
2016	26th	24th	21st	17th
2017	24th	16th	16th	19th
2018	15th	30th	30th	27th
2019	not seeded	not seeded	not seeded	not seeded
2020	30th	not seeded	cancelled	absent
2021	not seeded	31st	16th	14th
2022	10th	absent	absent	absent
2023	protected ranking	protected ranking	absent	not seeded
2024	not seeded	20th	25th	25th

== Tennis Leagues ==
=== League finals: 1 (first place) ===
Finals by leagues Ultimate Tennis Showdown (UTS) (1–0)	League table results 1st place (1) 2nd place (0) 3rd place (0) 4th place (0)

Place	Date	League	Location	Surface	League Nickname	League Opponent players
Champion (1st)	Aug 2020	Ultimate Tennis Showdown (UTS)	France	Hard	(Russia) The Thunder	(France) The Volcano: Runner-up (2nd) (Czech Republic) The Prodigy: 3rd (Tunisia) The Warrior: 4th

== Fed Cup participation ==
Legend
Round Robin Group / World Group
Play-offs

=== Singles: 18 (9–9) ===
Edition	Round	Date	Location	Against	Surface	Opponent	W/L	Result
2009	WG SF	25 Apr 2009	Castellaneta, Italy	Italy	Clay	Francesca Schiavone	L	6–7^{(7–9)}, 6–4, 2–6
2011	WG QF	5 Feb 2011	Moscow, Russia	France	Hard (i)	Alizé Cornet	W	3–6, 6–3, 6–2
2011	WG SF	17 Apr 2011	Moscow, Russia	Italy	Hard (i)	Sara Errani	W	7–6^{(7–5)}, 7–6^{(7–4)}
2011	WG F	5 Nov 2011	Moscow, Russia	Czech Republic	Hard (i)	Lucie Šafářová	W	6–2, 6–4
2012	WG SF	21 Apr 2012	Moscow, Russia	Serbia	Clay (i)	Jelena Janković	L	4–6, 3–6
2012	WG SF	22 Apr 2012	Moscow, Russia	Serbia	Clay (i)	Ana Ivanovic	L	6–3, 0–6, 3–6
2013	WG SF	20 Apr 2012	Moscow, Russia	Slovakia	Clay (i)	Dominika Cibulková	L	4–6, 3–6
2015	WG SF	18 Apr 2015	Sochi, Russia	Germany	Clay (i)	Sabine Lisicki	W	4–6, 7–6^{(7–4)}, 6–3
2015	WG SF	19 Apr 2015	Sochi, Russia	Germany	Clay (i)	Angelique Kerber	L	1–6, 0–6
2015	WG F	14 Nov 2015	Prague, Czech Republic	Czech Republic	Hard (i)	Petra Kvitová	L	6–2, 1–6, 1–6
2015	WG F	15 Nov 2015	Prague, Czech Republic	Czech Republic	Hard (i)	Karolína Plíšková	L	3–6, 4–6
2017	WG PO	22 Apr 2017	Moscow, Russia	Belgium	Clay (i)	Elise Mertens	L	4–6, 0–6
2018	WG II PO	21 Apr 2018	Khanty-Mansiysk, Russia	Latvia	Clay (i)	Anastasija Sevastova	W	6–3, 2–6, 6–4
2018	WG II PO	22 Apr 2018	Khanty-Mansiysk, Russia	Latvia	Clay (i)	Jeļena Ostapenko	L	5–7, 1–6
2019	E/A I	6 Feb 2019	Zielona Góra, Poland	Poland	Hard (i)	Magda Linette	W	6–4, 6–3
2019	E/A I	9 Feb 2019	Zielona Góra, Poland	Sweden	Hard (i)	Rebecca Peterson	W	6–3, 6–2
2019	WG II PO	20 Apr 2019	Moscow, Russia	Italy	Clay (i)	Jasmine Paolini	W	7–6^{(7–4)}, 7–6^{(7–5)}
2019	WG II PO	21 Apr 2019	Moscow, Russia	Italy	Clay (i)	Martina Trevisan	W	6–4, 6–3

=== Doubles: 7 (5–2) ===
Edition	Round	Date	Location	Against	Surface	Partner	Opponents	W/L	Result
2009	WG SF	25 Apr 2009	Castellaneta, Italy	Italy	Clay	Nadia Petrova	Sara Errani; Roberta Vinci	L	6–1, 3–6, 4–6
2011	WG QF	6 Feb 2011	Moscow, Russia	France	Hard (i)	Svetlana Kuznetsova	Julie Coin; Alizé Cornet	W	7–6^{(7–4)}, 6–0
2011	WG SF	17 Apr 2011	Moscow, Russia	Italy	Hard (i)	Ekaterina Makarova	Alberta Brianti; Maria-Elena Camerin	W	7–6^{(7–3)}, 6–1
2012	WG SF	21 Apr 2012	Moscow, Russia	Serbia	Clay (i)	Elena Vesnina	Bojana Jovanovski; Aleksandra Krunić	W	6–4, 6–0
2015	WG QF	8 Feb 2015	Kraków, Poland	Poland	Hard (i)	Vitalia Diatchenko	Klaudia Jans-Ignacik; Alicja Rosolska	W	6–4, 6–4
2015	WG SF	19 Apr 2015	Sochi, Russia	Germany	Clay (i)	Elena Vesnina	Sabine Lisicki; Andrea Petkovic	W	6–2, 6–3
2015	WG F	15 Nov 2015	Prague, Czech Republic	Czech Republic	Clay (i)	Elena Vesnina	Karolína Plíšková; Barbora Strýcová	L	6–4, 3–6, 2–6

== Top 10 wins ==
Season	2009	2010	2011	2012	2013	2014	2015	2016	2017	2018	2019	2020	2021	...	2024	Total
Wins	4	1	4	1	3	6	2	1	4	2	4	2	2		2	38

#	Opponent	Rk	Event	Surface	Rd	Score	Rk
2009
1.	(Serbia) Jelena Janković	3	Indian Wells Open, US	Hard	2R	6–4, 6–4	42
2.	(Poland) Agnieszka Radwańska	10	Indian Wells Open, US	Hard	QF	7–6^{(10–8)}, 6–4	42
3.	(United States) Venus Williams	3	Pan Pacific Open, Japan	Hard	2R	7–6^{(8–6)}, 7–5	40
4.	(United States) Venus Williams	3	China Open, China	Hard	2R	3–6, 6–1, 6–4	39
2010
5.	(Russia) Elena Dementieva	6	Cincinnati Open, US	Hard	2R	6–1, 6–3	25
2011
6.	(Serbia) Jelena Janković	6	Monterrey Open, Mexico	Hard	F	2–6, 6–2, 6–3	19
7.	(Australia) Samantha Stosur	8	Madrid Open, Spain	Clay	3R	7–6^{(7–4)}, 6–3	21
8.	(Russia) Vera Zvonareva	3	French Open, France	Clay	4R	7–6^{(7–4)}, 2–6, 6–2	15
9.	(Italy) Francesca Schiavone	8	US Open, US	Hard	4R	5–7, 6–3, 6–4	16
2012
10.	(Denmark) Caroline Wozniacki	8	Cincinnati Open, US	Hard	3R	6–4, 6–4	23
2013
11.	(Czech Republic) Petra Kvitová	8	Brisbane International, Australia	Hard	2R	6–4, 7–5	36
12.	(Germany) Angelique Kerber	5	Brisbane International, Australia	Hard	QF	7–6^{(7–3)}, 7–6^{(7–3)}	36
13.	(Germany) Angelique Kerber	6	Monterrey Open, Mexico	Hard	F	4–6, 6–2, 6–4	26
2014
14.	(Germany) Angelique Kerber	9	Open GdF Suez, France	Hard (i)	QF	5–7, 6–3, 7–6^{(7–3)}	26
15.	(Russia) Maria Sharapova	5	Open GdF Suez, France	Hard (i)	SF	4–6, 6–3, 6–4	26
16.	(Italy) Sara Errani	7	Open GdF Suez, France	Hard (i)	F	3–6, 6–2, 6–3	26
17.	(Serbia) Jelena Janković	7	Madrid Open, Spain	Clay	2R	6–2, 5–7, 7–6^{(7–3)}	26
18.	(Poland) Agnieszka Radwańska	4	Eastbourne International, UK	Grass	1R	6–4, 3–6, 7–6^{(7–4)}	26
19.	(Serbia) Ana Ivanovic	10	Wuhan Open, China	Hard	1R	7–5, 6–5, ret.	30
2015
20.	(Italy) Flavia Pennetta	7	China Open, China	Hard	3R	3–6, 6–4, 6–3	32
21.	(Czech Republic) Lucie Šafářová	9	Kremlin Cup, Russia	Hard (i)	2R	6–1, 6–7^{(2–7)}, 6–3	31
2016
22.	(Poland) Agnieszka Radwańska	4	Canadian Open, Canada	Hard	3R	6–4, 6–7^{(3–7)}, 6–1	19
2017
23.	(Russia) Svetlana Kuznetsova	9	Sydney International, Australia	Hard	2R	7–5, 6–3	27
24.	(Russia) Svetlana Kuznetsova	10	Australian Open, Australia	Hard	4R	6–3, 6–3	27
25.	(Slovakia) Dominika Cibulková	5	Indian Wells Open, US	Hard	4R	6–4, 3–6, 6–2	21
26.	(Germany) Angelique Kerber	1	Monterrey Open, Mexico	Hard	F	6–4, 2–6, 6–1	16
2018
27.	(Spain) Garbiñe Muguruza	3	Stuttgart Open, Germany	Clay (i)	2R	7–5, ret.	27
28.	(Czech Republic) Petra Kvitová	5	Wuhan Open, China	Hard	3R	3–6, 6–3, 6–3	39
2019
29.	(Netherlands) Kiki Bertens	9	Australian Open, Australia	Hard	2R	3–6, 6–3, 6–3	44
30.	(United States) Sloane Stephens	5	Australian Open, Australia	Hard	4R	6–7^{(3–7)}, 6–3, 6–3	44
31.	(Belarus) Aryna Sabalenka	9	Canadian Open, Canada	Hard	1R	3–6, 6–3, 7–5	44
32.	(Netherlands) Kiki Bertens	8	Pan Pacific Open, Japan	Hard	2R	6–1, 7–5	41
2020
33.	(Czech Republic) Karolína Plíšková	2	Australian Open, Australia	Hard	3R	7–6^{(7–4)}, 7–6^{(7–3)}	30
34.	(Switzerland) Belinda Bencic	4	Dubai Championships, UAE	Hard	1R	1–6, 6–1, 6–1	31
2021
35.	(Czech Republic) Karolína Plíšková	9	Madrid Open, Spain	Clay	2R	6–0, 7–5	41
36.	(Belarus) Aryna Sabalenka	4	French Open, France	Clay	3R	6–4, 2–6, 6–0	32
2024
37.	(Czech Republic) Markéta Vondroušová	8	Qatar Open, Qatar	Hard	3R	7–5, 6–3	32
38.	(China) Zheng Qinwen	7	Cincinnati Open, US	Hard	3R	7–5, 6–1	28

=== Double bagel matches (6–0, 6–0) ===
Result	W–L	Year	Tournament	Tier	Surface	Opponent	Rank	Rd
Win	1–0	2006	ITF Minsk, Belarus	25,000	Carpet (i)	(Ukraine) Kateryna Yergina	1170	Q1
Win	2–0	2018	Internationaux de Strasbourg, France	International	Clay	(Germany) Tatjana Maria	64	2R
Win	3–0	2019	Monterrey Open, Mexico	International	Hard	(Serbia) Ivana Jorović	100	2R
Loss	3–1	2023	Italian Open, Italy	WTA 1000	Clay	(Poland) Iga Świątek (1)	1	2R
Win	4–1	2023	Hong Kong Open, China	WTA 250	Hard	(Croatia) Jana Fett	196	1R

== Exhibition finals ==
Result	Date	Tournament	Surface	Opponent	Score
Win	Aug 2020	Ultimate Tennis Showdown, Sophia Antipolis, France	Hard	(France) Alizé Cornet	16–8, 12–11, 11–14, 9–16, 3–1
