= 2018 Internationaux de Strasbourg – Doubles =

Doubles
- 2018 Internationaux de Strasbourg

Final
- Champions: (Romania) Mihaela Buzărnescu (Romania) Raluca Olaru
- Runners-up: (Ukraine) Nadiia Kichenok (Australia) Anastasia Rodionova
- Score: 7–5, 7–5

Events
Singles	Doubles
← 2017 ·	Internationaux de Strasbourg	· 2019 →

Ashleigh Barty and Casey Dellacqua were the defending champions, but Dellacqua retired from professional tennis in February 2018, and Barty decided not to participate.

Mihaela Buzărnescu and Raluca Olaru won the title, defeating Nadiia Kichenok and Anastasia Rodionova in the final, 7–5, 7–5.

== Seeds ==
1. (Chinese Taipei) Chan Hao-ching / (China) Yang Zhaoxuan (first round)
2. (Japan) Shuko Aoyama / (Czech Republic) Renata Voráčová (first round)
3. (Ukraine) Nadiia Kichenok / (Australia) Anastasia Rodionova (final)
4. (Georgia (country)) Oksana Kalashnikova / (Russia) Alla Kudryavtseva (first round)

== Draw ==
=== Key ===
- Q = Qualifier
- WC = Wild card
- LL = Lucky loser
- Alt = Alternate
- SE = Special exempt
- PR = Protected ranking
- ITF = ITF entry
- JE = Junior exempt
- w/o = Walkover
- r = Retired
- d = Defaulted
- SR = Special ranking

=== Draw ===
First round
1	(Chinese Taipei) H-c Chan (China) Z Yang	6	4	[2]
(Romania) M Buzărnescu (Romania) R Olaru	3	6	[10]
WC	(France) J Tomera (France) W Vitis	0	1
(Estonia) K Kanepi (Poland) K Piter	6	6
4	(Georgia (country)) O Kalashnikova (Russia) A Kudryavtseva	6	6^{2}	[5]
(Switzerland) X Knoll (United Kingdom) A Smith	2	7^{7}	[10]
(China) Q Wang (China) Y Wang	6	6
(Australia) M Adamczak (India) P Thombare	1	2
(Romania) J Cristian (United States) S Kenin	6	6
(Hungary) RL Jani (Croatia) T Mrdeža	1	2
(Russia) N Dzalamidze (Argentina) M Irigoyen	6^{5}	6	[0]
3	(Ukraine) N Kichenok (Australia) An Rodionova	7^{7}	3	[10]
(China) C Liang (Australia) J Moore	3	6^{2}
(Chinese Taipei) L Chan (Thailand) L Kumkhum	6	7^{7}
(Japan) M Ninomiya (Russia) Y Sizikova	7^{7}	6
2	(Japan) S Aoyama (Czech Republic) R Voráčová	6^{5}	2

Quarterfinals
(Romania) M Buzărnescu (Romania) R Olaru	6	6
(Estonia) K Kanepi (Poland) K Piter	1	4
(Switzerland) X Knoll (United Kingdom) A Smith	6	3	[10]
(China) Q Wang (China) Y Wang	3	6	[5]
(Romania) J Cristian (United States) S Kenin	3	7	[7]
3	(Ukraine) N Kichenok (Australia) An Rodionova	6	5	[10]
(Chinese Taipei) L Chan (Thailand) L Kumkhum	6	6
(Japan) M Ninomiya (Russia) Y Sizikova	2	4

Semifinals
(Romania) M Buzărnescu (Romania) R Olaru	7	6
(Switzerland) X Knoll (United Kingdom) A Smith	5	2
3	(Ukraine) N Kichenok (Australia) An Rodionova	6	7
(Chinese Taipei) L Chan (Thailand) L Kumkhum	2	5

Final
(Romania) M Buzărnescu (Romania) R Olaru	7	7
3	(Ukraine) N Kichenok (Australia) An Rodionova	5	5
