= 2012 Citi Open – Men's doubles =

Men's doubles
- 2012 Citi Open

Final
- Champions: (Philippines) Treat Conrad Huey (United Kingdom) Dominic Inglot
- Runners-up: (South Africa) Kevin Anderson (United States) Sam Querrey
- Score: 7–6^{(9–7)}, 6–7^{(9–11)}, [10–5]

Details
- Draw: 16
- Seeds: 4

Events
| Singles | men | women |
| Doubles | men | women |
- Washington Open

Michaël Llodra and Nenad Zimonjić were the defending champions, but both opted to play at the London Summer Olympics instead.
Treat Conrad Huey and Dominic Inglot won the title, defeating Kevin Anderson and Sam Querrey 7–6^{(9–7)}, 6–7^{(9–11)}, [10–5], in the final.

== Seeds ==
1. (Mexico) Santiago González / (United States) Scott Lipsky (first round)
2. (Colombia) Robert Farah / (Pakistan) Aisam-ul-Haq Qureshi (quarterfinals)
3. (United States) Eric Butorac / (Australia) Paul Hanley (quarterfinals)
4. (Czech Republic) František Čermák / (Austria) Julian Knowle (first round)

== Draw ==
Key

- Q = Qualifier
- WC = Wild card
- LL = Lucky loser
- Alt = Alternate
- ITF = ITF entry
- PR = Protected ranking
- SR = Special ranking
- SE = Special exempt
- JE = Junior exempt
- JR = Junior Accelerator Programme entrant
- CO = College Accelerator Programme entrant
- NG = Next Gen Accelerator Program entrant
- w/o = Walkover
- r = Retired
- d = Defaulted

=== Draw ===
First round
1 | (Mexico) S González (United States) S Lipsky | 7^{7} | 3 | [8]
WC | (United States) J Blake (United States) T Smyczek | 6^{5} | 6 | [10]
(France) N Mahut (France) É Roger-Vasselin | 6 | 6
(Germany) F Moser (France) B Paire | 4 | 1
3 | (United States) E Butorac (Australia) P Hanley | 6 | 5 | [13]
(Germany) T Haas (The Bahamas) M Knowles | 3 | 7 | [11]
(Spain) P Andújar (Germany) M Kohlmann | 6^{5} | 6^{4}
(South Africa) K Anderson (United States) S Querrey | 7^{7} | 7^{7}
(United States) J Cerretani (Argentina) L Mayer | 5 | 6^{6}
WC | (United States) D Courtney (United States) S Johnson | 7 | 7^{8}
Alt | (United Kingdom) J Delgado (United Kingdom) K Skupski | 6 | 7
4 | (Czech Republic) F Čermák (Austria) J Knowle | 3 | 5
(Ukraine) A Dolgopolov (Belgium) X Malisse | 5 | 6 | [6]
(Philippines) TC Huey (United Kingdom) D Inglot | 7 | 4 | [10]
(Australia) M Ebden (United Kingdom) J Marray | 2 | 6 | [4]
2 | (Colombia) R Farah (Pakistan) A-u-H Qureshi | 6 | 4 | [10]

Quarterfinals
WC | (United States) J Blake (United States) T Smyczek | 7 | 3 | [8]
(France) N Mahut (France) É Roger-Vasselin | 5 | 6 | [10]
3 | (United States) E Butorac (Australia) P Hanley | 3 | 6 | [6]
(South Africa) K Anderson (United States) S Querrey | 6 | 3 | [10]
WC | (United States) D Courtney (United States) S Johnson | 7^{7} | 6
Alt | (United Kingdom) J Delgado (United Kingdom) K Skupski | 6^{5} | 4
(Philippines) TC Huey (United Kingdom) D Inglot | 6 | 6
2 | (Colombia) R Farah (Pakistan) A-u-H Qureshi | 2 | 2

Semifinals
(France) N Mahut (France) É Roger-Vasselin | 3 | 4
(South Africa) K Anderson (United States) S Querrey | 6 | 6
WC | (United States) D Courtney (United States) S Johnson | 4 | 4
(Philippines) TC Huey (United Kingdom) D Inglot | 6 | 6

Final
(South Africa) K Anderson (United States) S Querrey | 6^{7} | 7^{11} | [5]
(Philippines) TC Huey (United Kingdom) D Inglot | 7^{9} | 6^{9} | [10]
