= 2018 Internationaux de Strasbourg – Singles =

Singles
- 2018 Internationaux de Strasbourg

Final
- Champion: (Russia) Anastasia Pavlyuchenkova
- Runner-up: (Slovakia) Dominika Cibulková
- Score: 6–7^{(5–7)}, 7–6^{(7–3)}, 7–6^{(8–6)}

Events
Singles	Doubles
- Internationaux de Strasbourg

Samantha Stosur was the defending champion, but lost in the quarterfinals to Dominika Cibulková.

Anastasia Pavlyuchenkova won the title, defeating Cibulková in the final, 6–7^{(5–7)}, 7–6^{(7–3)}, 7–6^{(8–6)}. Pavlyuchenkova won the title after saving two match points Cibulková had in the final against her.

== Seeds ==
1. (Australia) Ashleigh Barty (semifinals, retired)
2. (Australia) Daria Gavrilova (second round)
3. (Russia) Anastasia Pavlyuchenkova (champion)
4. (Romania) Mihaela Buzărnescu (semifinals)
5. (Slovakia) Dominika Cibulková (final)
6. (Hungary) Tímea Babos (second round)
7. (United States) Danielle Collins (second round)
8. (Chinese Taipei) Hsieh Su-wei (quarterfinals)

== Draw ==
Key

- Q = Qualifier
- WC = Wild card
- LL = Lucky loser
- Alt = Alternate
- ITF = ITF entry
- PR = Protected ranking
- SR = Special ranking
- SE = Special exempt
- JE = Junior exempt
- JR = Junior Accelerator Programme entrant
- CO = College Accelerator Programme entrant
- NG = Next Gen Accelerator Program entrant
- w/o = Walkover
- r = Retired
- d = Defaulted

=== Finals ===
Semifinals
1	(Australia) Ashleigh Barty	4	0^{r}
3	(Russia) Anastasia Pavlyuchenkova	6	1
4	(Romania) Mihaela Buzărnescu	6	6^{5}	1
5/WC	(Slovakia) Dominika Cibulková	2	7^{7}	6

Final
3	(Russia) Anastasia Pavlyuchenkova	6^{5}	7^{7}	7^{8}
5/WC	(Slovakia) Dominika Cibulková	7^{7}	6^{3}	6^{6}

=== Top half ===
First round
1	(Australia) A Barty	6	6
LL	(Thailand) L Kumkhum	4	4
(China) Y Wang	4	6^{8}
(France) P Parmentier	6	7^{10}
(China) Q Wang	3	6	6
Q	(Italy) C Rosatello	6	1	4
(France) A Hesse	1	6	3
7	(United States) D Collins	6	4	6
3	(Russia) A Pavlyuchenkova	6	6
(Germany) T Maria	0	0
(Russia) N Vikhlyantseva	6	7^{7}
Q	(Croatia) T Mrdeža	3	6^{4}
(Kazakhstan) Z Diyas	6	6
Q	(Poland) K Piter	2	4
WC	(France) F Ferro	4	0
6	(Hungary) T Babos	6	6

Second round
1	(Australia) A Barty	6	6
(France) P Parmentier	1	4
(China) Q Wang	4	7	6
7	(United States) D Collins	6	5	2
3	(Russia) A Pavlyuchenkova	6	6
(Russia) N Vikhlyantseva	4	4
(Kazakhstan) Z Diyas	7^{7}	4	6
6	(Hungary) T Babos	6^{2}	6	2

Quarterfinals
1	(Australia) A Barty	7	6
(China) Q Wang	5	4
3	(Russia) A Pavlyuchenkova	6	6
(Kazakhstan) Z Diyas	4	2

Semifinals
1	(Australia) A Barty	4	0^{r}
3	(Russia) A Pavlyuchenkova	6	1

=== Bottom half ===
First round
8	(Chinese Taipei) S-w Hsieh	2	7	6
Q	(Estonia) K Kanepi	6	5	2
Q	(Russia) M Melnikova	2	6	3
WC	(Czech Republic) L Šafářová	6	4	6
(Venezuela) A Gámiz	3	1
LL	(Russia) E Rybakina	6	6
(Poland) M Linette	6	6^{1}	3
4	(Romania) M Buzărnescu	4	7^{7}	6
5/WC	(Slovakia) D Cibulková	6	6
Q	(France) C Paquet	4	2
(United States) S Vickery	3	5
PR	(Hungary) RL Jani	6	7
(Australia) S Stosur	6	6
(United States) S Kenin	3	2
(United States) J Brady	6^{8}	6^{6}
2	(Australia) D Gavrilova	7^{10}	7^{8}

Second round
8	(Chinese Taipei) S-w Hsieh	6	6
WC	(Czech Republic) L Šafářová	2	3
LL	(Russia) E Rybakina	3	6^{2}
4	(Romania) M Buzărnescu	6	7^{7}
5/WC	(Slovakia) D Cibulková	6	6
PR	(Hungary) RL Jani	1	4
(Australia) S Stosur	6	6
2	(Australia) D Gavrilova	3	4

Quarterfinals
8	(Chinese Taipei) S-w Hsieh	0	3
4	(Romania) M Buzărnescu	6	6
5/WC	(Slovakia) D Cibulková	6	6
(Australia) S Stosur	4	3

Semifinals
4	(Romania) M Buzărnescu	6	6^{5}	1
5/WC	(Slovakia) D Cibulková	2	7^{7}	6

== Qualifying ==
=== Seeds ===
1. (Estonia) Kaia Kanepi (qualified)
2. (Thailand) Luksika Kumkhum (qualifying competition, lucky loser)
3. (Spain) Sílvia Soler Espinosa (first round)
4. (France) Myrtille Georges (first round)
5. (Italy) Jessica Pieri (qualifying competition, retired)
6. (Croatia) Tereza Mrdeža (qualified)
7. (Russia) Elena Rybakina (qualifying competition, lucky loser)
8. (Romania) Jaqueline Cristian (qualifying competition)
9. (United States) Victoria Duval (qualifying competition)
10. (France) Chloé Paquet (qualified)
11. (Ukraine) Ganna Poznikhirenko (qualifying competition)
12. (Italy) Camilla Rosatello (qualified)

=== Qualifiers ===
1. (Estonia) Kaia Kanepi
2. (Italy) Camilla Rosatello
3. (Russia) Marina Melnikova
4. (Poland) Katarzyna Piter
5. (France) Chloé Paquet
6. (Croatia) Tereza Mrdeža

=== Lucky losers ===
1. (Thailand) Luksika Kumkhum
2. (Russia) Elena Rybakina

==== First qualifier ====
First round
1	(Estonia) Kaia Kanepi	6	6
WC	(France) Virginie Razzano	1	2
(France) Victoria Muntean	6	4	1
7	(Russia) Elena Rybakina	4	6	6

Qualifying competition
1	(Estonia) Kaia Kanepi	6	6
7	(Russia) Elena Rybakina	2	3

==== Second qualifier ====
First round
2	(Thailand) Luksika Kumkhum	6	6
WC	(France) Joanna Tomera	2	1
(Russia) Yana Sizikova	2	1^{r}
12	(Italy) Camilla Rosatello	6	4

Qualifying competition
2	(Thailand) Luksika Kumkhum	4	6^{4}
12	(Italy) Camilla Rosatello	6	7^{7}

==== Third qualifier ====
First round
3	(Spain) Sílvia Soler Espinosa	5	2
(Russia) Marina Melnikova	7	6
WC	(France) Wallis Vitis	3	2
11	(Ukraine) Ganna Poznikhirenko	6	6

Qualifying competition
(Russia) Marina Melnikova	6	6
11	(Ukraine) Ganna Poznikhirenko	1	4

==== Fourth qualifier ====
First round
4	(France) Myrtille Georges	1	7^{7}	4
(Poland) Katarzyna Piter	6	6^{5}	6
(Slovakia) Vivien Juhászová	6^{3}	1^{r}
8	(Romania) Jaqueline Cristian	7^{7}	4

Qualifying competition
(Poland) Katarzyna Piter	6	6
8	(Romania) Jaqueline Cristian	3	2

==== Fifth qualifier ====
First round
5	(Italy) Jessica Pieri	3	7	6
(Latvia) Diāna Marcinkēviča	6	5	3
(Japan) Shuko Aoyama	6	6^{6}	3
10	(France) Chloé Paquet	3	7^{8}	6

Qualifying competition
5	(Italy) Jessica Pieri	1	0^{r}
10	(France) Chloé Paquet	6	2

==== Sixth qualifier ====
First round
6	(Croatia) Tereza Mrdeža	6	6
WC	(France) Marine Partaud	3	3
(Ukraine) Anastasiya Vasylyeva	4	2
9	(United States) Victoria Duval	6	6

Qualifying competition
6	(Croatia) Tereza Mrdeža	6	6
9	(United States) Victoria Duval	3	2
