= 2012 Citi Open =

- Date: July 29 – August 5
- Edition: 44th (men) / 2nd (women)
- Category: ATP World Tour 500 (men); WTA International (women)
- Surface: Hard / outdoor
- Location: Washington, D.C., United States

Champions

Men's singles
- (Ukraine) Alexandr Dolgopolov

Women's singles
- (Slovakia) Magdaléna Rybáriková

Men's doubles
- (Philippines) Treat Conrad Huey / (United Kingdom) Dominic Inglot

Women's doubles
- (Japan) Shuko Aoyama / (Chinese Taipei) Chang Kai-chen
- Washington Open

The 2012 Citi Open (known as such for sponsorship reasons) was a tennis tournament played on outdoor hard courts. It was the 44th edition (for the men) and the 2nd edition (for the women) of the event known that year as the Citi Open (previously known on the men's tour as the Legg Mason Tennis Classic), and was part of the ATP World Tour 500 series of the 2012 ATP World Tour, and of the WTA International tournaments of the 2012 WTA Tour. It took place at the William H.G. FitzGerald Tennis Center in Washington, D.C., United States, from July 29 to August 5, 2012, running concurrently with the tennis event at the London Summer Olympics.

== Finals ==
=== Men's singles ===
(Ukraine) Alexandr Dolgopolov defeated (Germany) Tommy Haas, 6–7^{(7–9)}, 6–4, 6–1

- It was Dolgopolov's first singles title of the year, and the second of his career.

=== Women's singles ===
(Slovakia) Magdaléna Rybáriková defeated (Russia) Anastasia Pavlyuchenkova, 6–1, 6–1

- It was Rybáriková's first singles title of the year, and the third of her career.

=== Men's doubles ===
(Philippines) Treat Conrad Huey / (United Kingdom) Dominic Inglot defeated (South Africa) Kevin Anderson / (United States) Sam Querrey, 7–6^{(9–7)}, 6–7^{(9–11)}, [10–5]

- It was Huey's first doubles title of the year, and of his career.
- It was Inglot's first doubles title of the year, and of his career.

=== Women's doubles ===
(Japan) Shuko Aoyama / (Chinese Taipei) Chang Kai-chen defeated (United States) Irina Falconi / (South Africa) Chanelle Scheepers, 7–5, 6–2

- It was Aoyama's first doubles title of the year, and of her career.
- It was Chang's second doubles title of the year, and the third of her career.

== ATP singles main-draw entrants ==
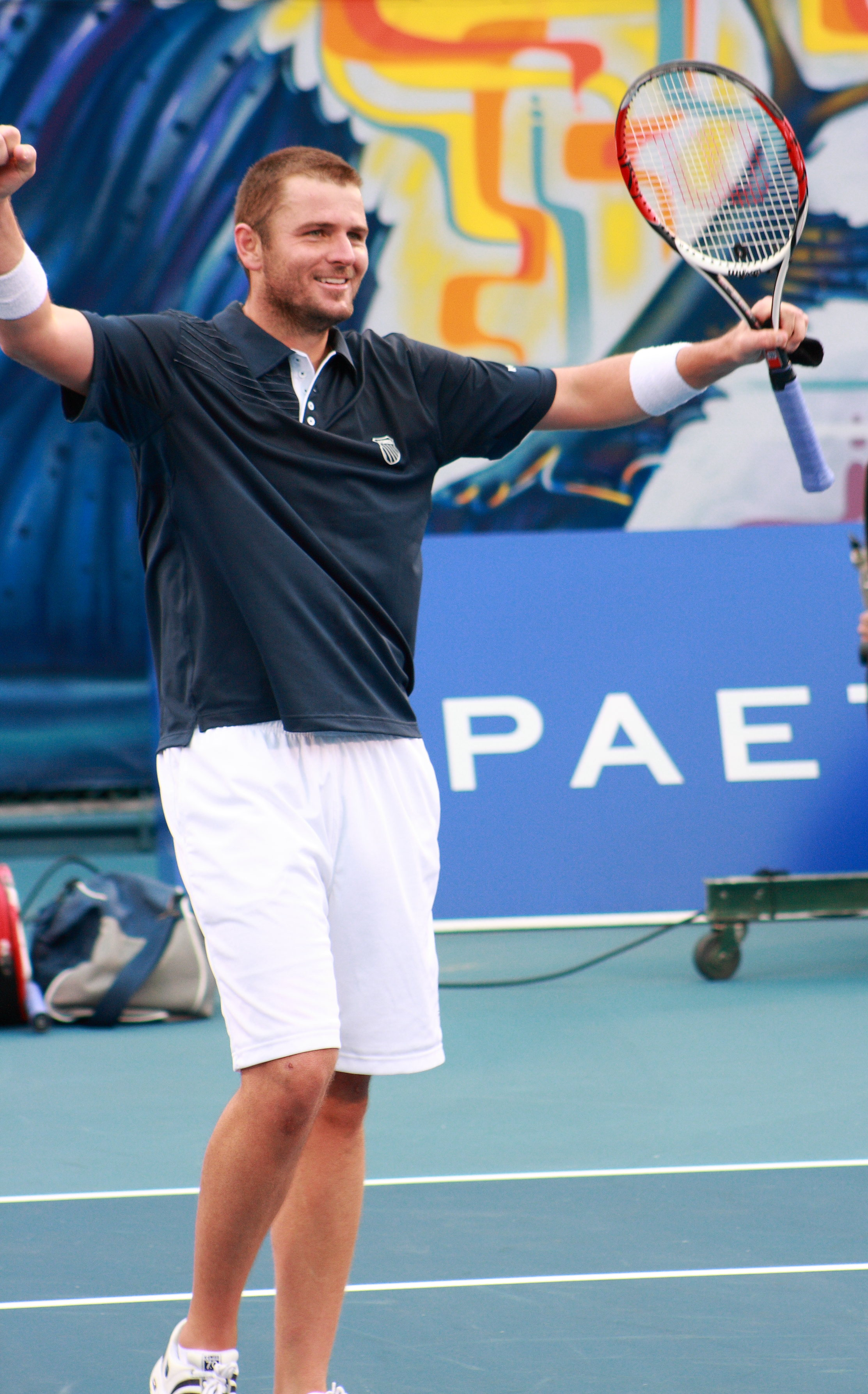
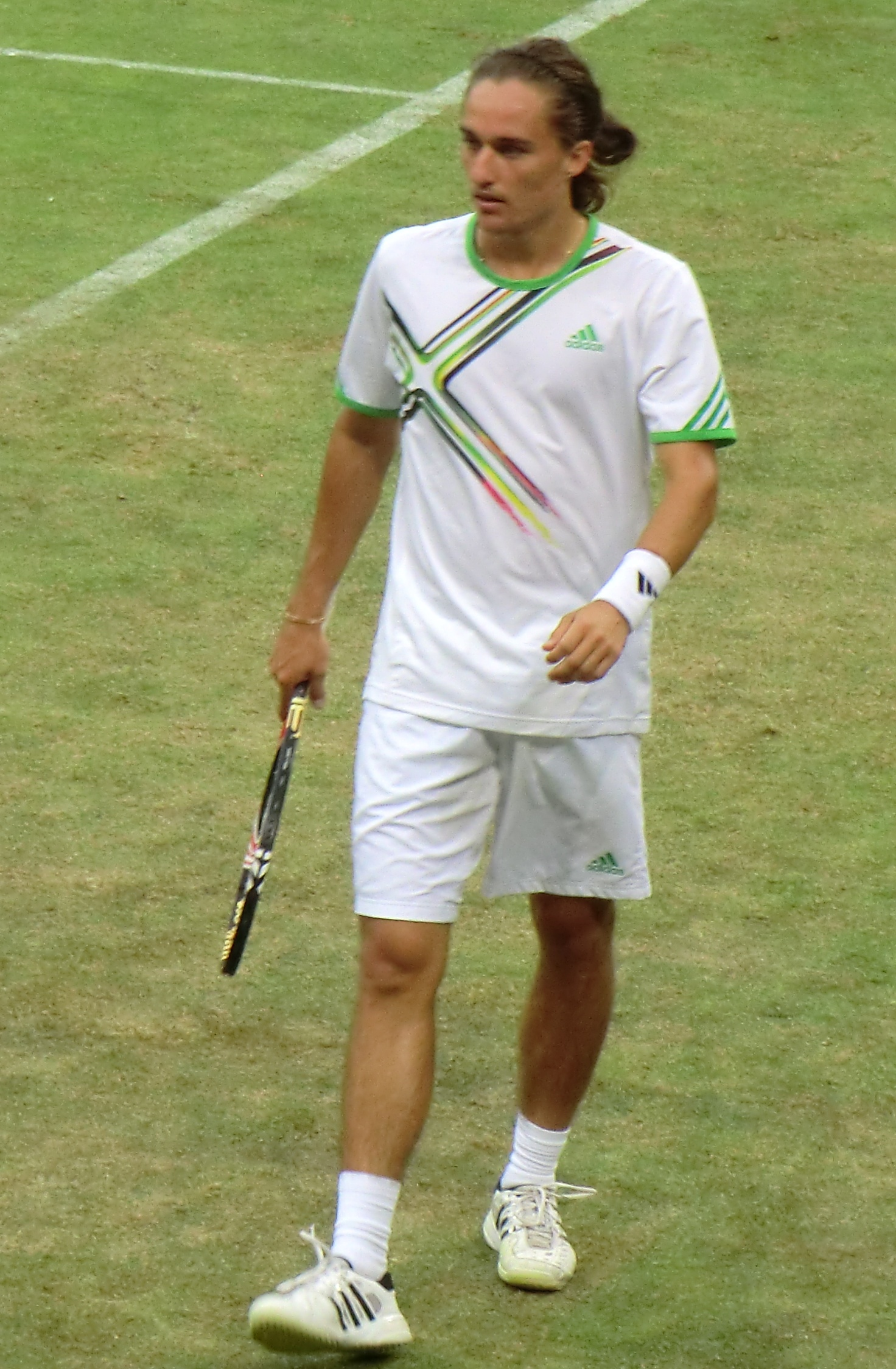
The singles field was headlined by Mardy Fish (left) and Alexandr Dolgopolov (right). Fish opted out of the London Olympics to focus on the hardcourt lead-ups to the US Open, while Dolgopolov was not selected by the Ukrainian tennis federation to compete in the Games.

=== Seeds ===
The following players were seeded in the main singles draw, following the ATP rankings of July 23, 2012:

Country	Player	Ranking	Seeds
USA	Mardy Fish	13	1
UKR	Alexandr Dolgopolov	17	2
RSA	Kevin Anderson	33	3
GER	Tommy Haas	35	4
ESP	Pablo Andújar	37	5
FRA	Jérémy Chardy	46	6
FRA	Benoît Paire	50	7
USA	Sam Querrey	57	8

=== Other entrants ===
The following players received wild cards into the main singles draw:

- (United States) Brian Baker
- (Lithuania) Ričardas Berankis
- (United States) Steve Johnson

The following players received entry from the singles qualifying draw:

- (Switzerland) Marco Chiudinelli
- (United States) Jesse Levine
- (United States) Michael Russell
- (France) Florent Serra

== ATP doubles main-draw entrants ==
=== Seeds ===
Country	Player	Country	Player	Rank^{1}	Seed
MEX	Santiago González	USA	Scott Lipsky	65	1
COL	Robert Farah	PAK	Aisam-ul-Haq Qureshi	73	2
USA	Eric Butorac	AUS	Paul Hanley	78	3
CZE	František Čermák	AUT	Julian Knowle	78	4

- Rankings are as of July 23, 2012

=== Other entrants ===
The following pairs received wildcards into the doubles main draw:

- (United States) James Blake / (United States) Tim Smyczek
- (United States) Drew Courtney / (United States) Steve Johnson

The following pair received entry as alternates:

- (United Kingdom) Jamie Delgado / (United Kingdom) Ken Skupski

=== Withdrawals ===
- (Spain) David Marrero (finger injury)

== WTA singles main-draw entrants ==
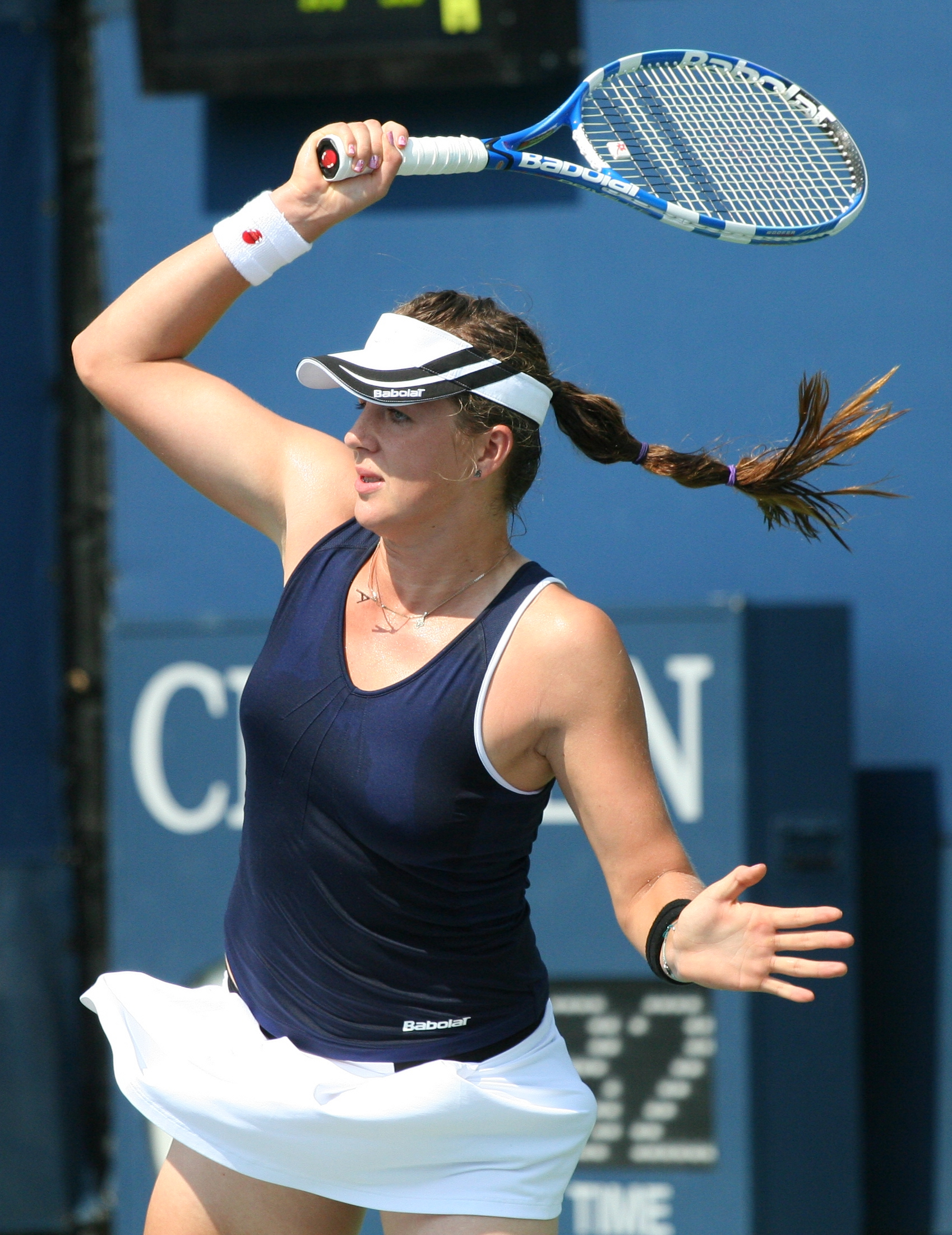
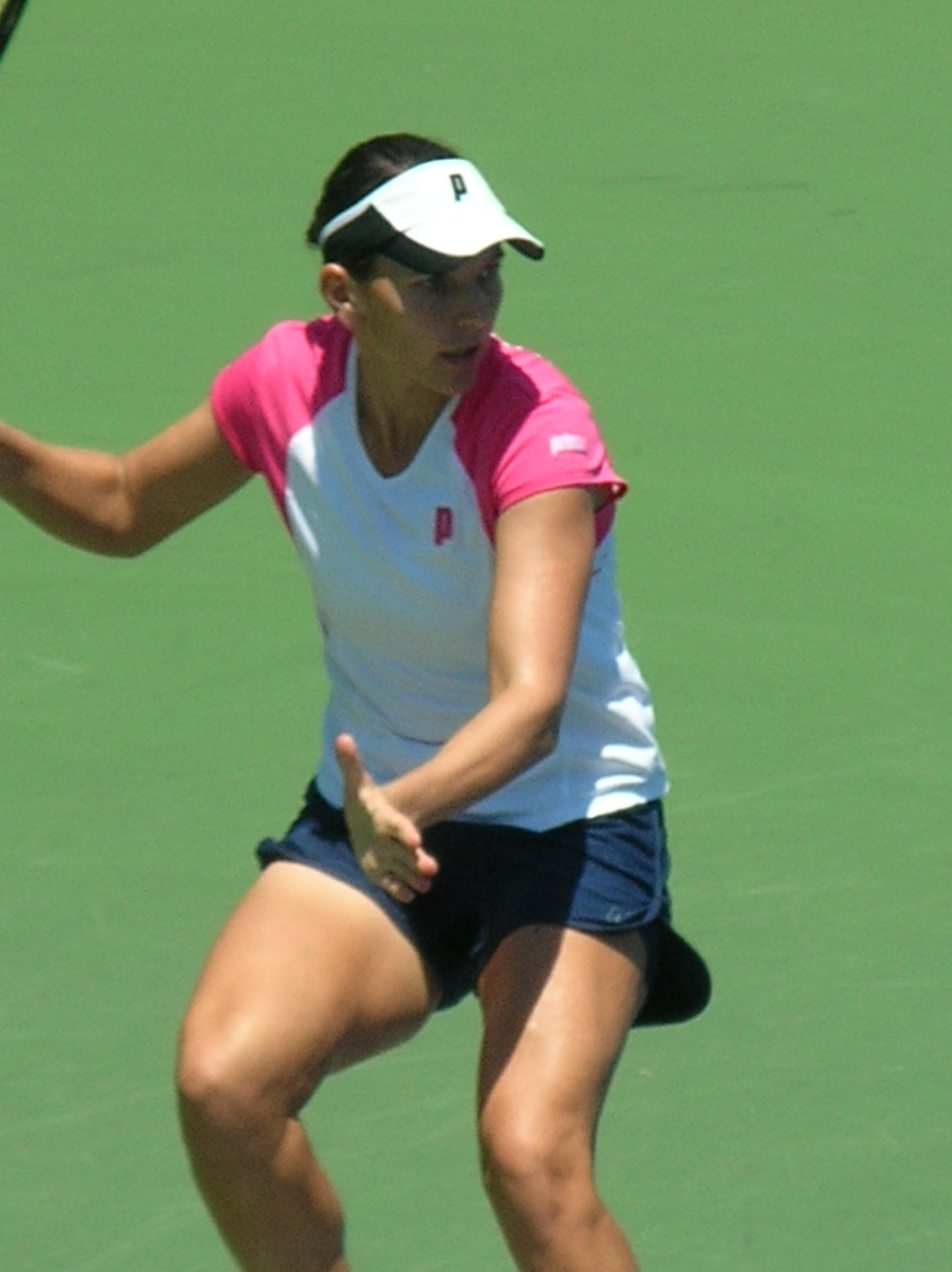
The singles field was headlined by Anastasia Pavlyuchenkova (left) and Chanelle Scheepers (right), neither of whom has been selected for the London Olympics, Pavlyuchenkova because four Russian players had already made the cut, and Scheepers because she chose not to fulfill the Fed Cup requirements to play the Games.

=== Seeds ===
The following players were seeded in the main singles draw, following the WTA rankings of July 23, 2012:

Country	Player	Ranking	Seeds
RUS	Anastasia Pavlyuchenkova	28	1
RSA	Chanelle Scheepers	42	2
USA	Sloane Stephens	52	3
USA	Vania King	56	4
CZE	Barbora Záhlavová-Strýcová	60	5
CZE	Iveta Benešová	61	6
USA	CoCo Vandeweghe	70	7
BLR	Olga Govortsova	81	8

=== Other entrants ===
The following players received wild cards into the main singles draw:

- (Canada) Eugenie Bouchard
- (Italy) Camila Giorgi
- (United States) CoCo Vandeweghe

The following players received entry from the singles qualifying draw:

- (Slovakia) Jana Čepelová
- (United States) Jennifer Elie
- (Portugal) Michelle Larcher de Brito
- (France) Aravane Rezaï

=== Withdrawals ===
- (Japan) Ayumi Morita (lower back injury)
- (Switzerland) Romina Oprandi
- (France) Virginie Razzano (right hip injury)

== WTA doubles main-draw entrants ==
=== Seeds ===
Country	Player	Country	Player	Rank^{1}	Seed
BLR	Olga Govortsova	RUS	Alla Kudryavtseva	105	1
CZE	Karolína Plíšková	CZE	Kristýna Plíšková	193	2
USA	Lindsay Lee-Waters	USA	Megan Moulton-Levy	194	3
GRE	Eleni Daniilidou	ITA	Karin Knapp	293	4

- ^{1} Rankings are as of July 23, 2012

=== Other entrants ===
The following pair received wildcard into the doubles main draw:

- (United States) Simone Kalhorn / (United States) Alessondra Parra

=== Retirements ===
- (Italy) Karin Knapp (knee pain)
