= 2017 Monterrey Open – Doubles =

Doubles
- 2017 Monterrey Open

Final
- Champions: (Japan) Nao Hibino (Poland) Alicja Rosolska
- Runners-up: (Slovenia) Dalila Jakupović (Ukraine) Nadiia Kichenok
- Score: 6–2, 7–6^{(7–4)}

Details
- Draw: 16
- Seeds: 4

Events
Singles	Doubles
← 2016 ·	Monterrey Open	· 2018 →

Anabel Medina Garrigues and Arantxa Parra Santonja were the defending champions, but chose not to participate this year.

Nao Hibino and Alicja Rosolska won the title, defeating Dalila Jakupović and Nadiia Kichenok in the final, 6–2, 7–6^{(7–4)}.

== Seeds ==
1. (Japan) Nao Hibino / (Poland) Alicja Rosolska (champions)
2. (Germany) Tatjana Maria / (United Kingdom) Heather Watson (first round)
3. (Argentina) María Irigoyen / (Poland) Paula Kania (quarterfinals)
4. (Russia) Natela Dzalamidze / (Luxembourg) Mandy Minella (first round)

== Draw ==
=== Key ===
- Q = Qualifier
- WC = Wild card
- LL = Lucky loser
- Alt = Alternate
- SE = Special exempt
- PR = Protected ranking
- ITF = ITF entry
- JE = Junior exempt
- w/o = Walkover
- r = Retired
- d = Defaulted
- SR = Special ranking

=== Draw ===
First round
1	(Japan) N Hibino (Poland) A Rosolska	2	6	[10]
(United States) J Cako (United States) J Loeb	6	3	[6]
(United States) J Boserup (United Kingdom) N Broady	6	6
(Brazil) L Pigossi (Spain) S Sorribes Tormo	3	4
4	(Russia) N Dzalamidze (Luxembourg) M Minella	3	5
(Australia) M Adamczak (United States) N Melichar	6	7
(United Kingdom) J Rae (United Kingdom) A Smith	3	4
(United States) A Weinhold (United States) C Whoriskey	6	6
(Russia) I Khromacheva (Serbia) N Stojanović	6	7
WC	(Mexico) V Rodríguez (Mexico) AS Sánchez	4	5
(Canada) E Bouchard (United States) C McHale	2	5
3	(Argentina) M Irigoyen (Poland) P Kania	6	7
(United States) M Brengle (Germany) N Geuer	6	6
WC	(Serbia) J Jakšić (Mexico) M Zacarías	2	3
(Slovenia) D Jakupović (Ukraine) N Kichenok	6	6
2	(Germany) T Maria (United Kingdom) H Watson	3	3

Quarterfinals
1	(Japan) N Hibino (Poland) A Rosolska	6	6
(United States) J Boserup (United Kingdom) N Broady	3	4
(Australia) M Adamczak (United States) N Melichar	4	6^{6}
(United States) A Weinhold (United States) C Whoriskey	6	7^{8}
(Russia) I Khromacheva (Serbia) N Stojanović	6	6
3	(Argentina) M Irigoyen (Poland) P Kania	4	2
(United States) M Brengle (Germany) N Geuer	4	1
(Slovenia) D Jakupović (Ukraine) N Kichenok	6	6

Semifinals
1	(Japan) N Hibino (Poland) A Rosolska	6	6
(United States) A Weinhold (United States) C Whoriskey	2	3
(Russia) I Khromacheva (Serbia) N Stojanović	6	3	[8]
(Slovenia) D Jakupović (Ukraine) N Kichenok	4	6	[10]

Final
1	(Japan) N Hibino (Poland) A Rosolska	6	7^{7}
(Slovenia) D Jakupović (Ukraine) N Kichenok	2	6^{4}
