= 2017 Monterrey Open =

- Date: 3–9 April
- Edition: 9th
- Category: WTA International
- Draw: 32S / 16D
- Prize money: $250,000
- Surface: Hard
- Location: Monterrey, Mexico

Champions

Singles
- (Russia) Anastasia Pavlyuchenkova

Doubles
- (Japan) Nao Hibino / (Poland) Alicja Rosolska
| ← 2016 · | Monterrey Open | · 2018 → |

The 2017 Monterrey Open was a women's tennis tournament played on outdoor hard courts. It was the ninth edition of the Monterrey Open and an International tournament on the 2017 WTA Tour. It took place at the Club Sonoma in Monterrey, Mexico, from 3 April until 9 April 2017. Second-seeded Anastasia Pavlyuchenkova won the singles title.

== Finals ==
=== Singles ===
(Russia) Anastasia Pavlyuchenkova defeated (Germany) Angelique Kerber, 6–4, 2–6, 6–1

- It was Pavlyuchenkova's 1st singles title of the year and the 9th of her career.

=== Doubles ===
(Japan) Nao Hibino / (Poland) Alicja Rosolska defeated (Slovenia) Dalila Jakupović / (Ukraine) Nadiia Kichenok, 6–2, 7–6^{(7–4)}

== Points and prize money ==
=== Point distribution ===
| Event | W | F | SF | QF | Round of 16 | Round of 32 | Q | Q3 | Q2 | Q1 |
| Singles | 280 | 180 | 110 | 60 | 30 | 1 | 18 | 14 | 10 | 1 |
| Doubles | 280 | 180 | 110 | 60 | 1 | — | — | — | — | — |

=== Prize money ===
| Event | W | F | SF | QF | Round of 16 | Round of 32 | Q3 | Q2 | Q1 |
| Singles | $43,000 | $21,400 | $11,300 | $5,900 | $3,310 | $1,925 | $1,005 | $730 | $530 |
| Doubles | $12,300 | $6,400 | $3,435 | $1,820 | $960 | — | — | — | — |
Doubles prize money per team

== Singles main draw entrants ==
=== Seeds ===
| Country | Player | Ranking^{1} | Seed |
|---|---|---|---|
| GER | Angelique Kerber | 1 | 1 |
| RUS | Anastasia Pavlyuchenkova | 17 | 2 |
| FRA | Caroline Garcia | 23 | 3 |
| ESP | Carla Suárez Navarro | 24 | 4 |
| HUN | Tímea Babos | 27 | 5 |
| RUS | Ekaterina Makarova | 35 | 6 |
| FRA | Alizé Cornet | 44 | 7 |
| USA | Christina McHale | 46 | 8 |

- ^{1} Rankings as of 20 March 2017.

=== Other entrants ===
The following players received wildcards into the main draw:

- (Russia) Ekaterina Makarova
- (Italy) Francesca Schiavone
- (Mexico) Renata Zarazúa

The following players received entry from the qualifying draw:

- (United States) Kristie Ahn
- (Netherlands) Lesley Kerkhove
- (Czech Republic) Tereza Martincová
- (Argentina) Nadia Podoroska

=== Withdrawals ===
Before the tournament

- (United States) Nicole Gibbs →replaced by (Romania) Patricia Maria Țig
- (Romania) Monica Niculescu →replaced by (Czech Republic) Denisa Allertová
- (Japan) Risa Ozaki →replaced by (Belgium) Alison Van Uytvanck

== Doubles main draw entrants ==
=== Seeds ===
| Country | Player | Country | Player | Rank^{1} | Seed |
|---|---|---|---|---|---|
| JPN | Nao Hibino | POL | Alicja Rosolska | 112 | 1 |
| GER | Tatjana Maria | GBR | Heather Watson | 152 | 2 |
| ARG | María Irigoyen | POL | Paula Kania | 161 | 3 |
| RUS | Natela Dzalamidze | LUX | Mandy Minella | 189 | 4 |

- Rankings as of March 20, 2017.

=== Other entrants ===
The following pairs received wildcards into the doubles main draw:

- (Serbia) Jovana Jakšić / (Mexico) Marcela Zacarías
- (Mexico) Victoria Rodríguez / (Mexico) Ana Sofía Sánchez
