= 2018 Internationaux de Strasbourg =

- Date: 21 – 26 May
- Edition: 32nd
- Category: WTA International tournaments
- Draw: 32S / 16D
- Prize money: $250,000
- Surface: Clay
- Location: Strasbourg, France
- Venue: Tennis Club de Strasbourg

Champions

Singles
- (Russia) Anastasia Pavlyuchenkova

Doubles
- (Romania) Mihaela Buzărnescu / (Romania) Raluca Olaru
| ← 2017 · | Internationaux de Strasbourg | · 2019 → |

The 2018 Internationaux de Strasbourg was a professional tennis tournament played on clay courts. It was the 32nd edition of the tournament and part of the International-level tournament category of the 2018 WTA Tour. It took place at the Tennis Club de Strasbourg in Strasbourg, France, between 21 and 26 May 2018.

== Points and prize money ==
| Event | W | F | SF | QF | Round of 16 | Round of 32 | Q | Q2 | Q1 |
| Women's singles | 280 | 180 | 110 | 60 | 30 | 1 | 18 | 12 | 1 |
| Women's doubles | 280 | 180 | 110 | 60 | 1 | — | — | — | — |

=== Prize money ===
| Event | W | F | SF | QF | Round of 16 | Round of 32 | Q2 | Q1 |
| Women's singles | $43,000 | $21,400 | $11,500 | $6,175 | $3,400 | $2,100 | $1,020 | $600 |
| Women's doubles | $12,300 | $6,400 | $3,435 | $1,820 | $960 | — | — | — |

== Singles main draw entrants ==
=== Seeds ===
| Country | Player | Rank^{1} | Seed |
|---|---|---|---|
| AUS | Ashleigh Barty | 18 | 1 |
| AUS | Daria Gavrilova | 24 | 2 |
| RUS | Anastasia Pavlyuchenkova | 29 | 3 |
| ROU | Mihaela Buzărnescu | 33 | 4 |
| SVK | Dominika Cibulková | 34 | 5 |
| HUN | Tímea Babos | 38 | 6 |
| USA | Danielle Collins | 47 | 7 |
| TPE | Hsieh Su-wei | 50 | 8 |

- Rankings are as of May 14, 2018.

=== Other entrants ===
The following players received wildcards into the singles main draw:

- (Slovakia) Dominika Cibulková
- (France) Fiona Ferro
- (Czech Republic) Lucie Šafářová

The following player received entry using a protected ranking into the singles main draw:

- (Hungary) Réka Luca Jani

The following players received entry from the qualifying draw:

- (Estonia) Kaia Kanepi
- (Russia) Marina Melnikova
- (Croatia) Tereza Mrdeža
- (France) Chloé Paquet
- (Poland) Katarzyna Piter
- (Italy) Camilla Rosatello

The following players received entry as lucky losers:

- (Thailand) Luksika Kumkhum
- (Russia) Elena Rybakina

=== Withdrawals ===
Before the tournament

- (United States) Catherine Bellis → replaced by (Poland) Magda Linette
- (France) Alizé Cornet → replaced by (Hungary) Réka Luca Jani
- (Italy) Camila Giorgi → replaced by (Thailand) Luksika Kumkhum
- (Brazil) Beatriz Haddad Maia → replaced by (United States) Sachia Vickery
- (Serbia) Aleksandra Krunić → replaced by (France) Amandine Hesse
- (Romania) Monica Niculescu → replaced by (Russia) Elena Rybakina
- (Puerto Rico) Monica Puig → replaced by (Russia) Natalia Vikhlyantseva
- (Belarus) Aryna Sabalenka → replaced by (United States) Sofia Kenin
- (Croatia) Donna Vekić → replaced by (United States) Jennifer Brady
- (Russia) Elena Vesnina → replaced by (France) Pauline Parmentier

=== Retirements ===
- (Australia) Ashleigh Barty

== Doubles main draw entrants ==
=== Seeds ===
| Country | Player | Country | Player | Rank^{1} | Seed |
|---|---|---|---|---|---|
| TPE | Chan Hao-ching | CHN | Yang Zhaoxuan | 39 | 1 |
| JPN | Shuko Aoyama | CZE | Renata Voráčová | 67 | 2 |
| UKR | Nadiia Kichenok | AUS | Anastasia Rodionova | 91 | 3 |
| GEO | Oksana Kalashnikova | RUS | Alla Kudryavtseva | 105 | 4 |

- ^{1} Rankings as of May 14, 2018.

=== Other entrants ===
The following pair received a wildcard into the doubles main draw:

- (France) Joanna Tomera / (France) Wallis Vitis

== Finals ==
=== Singles ===
- (Russia) Anastasia Pavlyuchenkova defeated (Slovakia) Dominika Cibulková, 6–7^{(5–7)}, 7–6^{(7–3)}, 7–6^{(8–6)}

=== Doubles ===
- (Romania) Mihaela Buzărnescu / (Romania) Raluca Olaru defeated (Ukraine) Nadiia Kichenok / (Australia) Anastasia Rodionova, 7–5, 7–5
