= 2012 Citi Open – Men's singles =

Men's singles
- 2012 Citi Open

Final
- Champion: (Ukraine) Alexandr Dolgopolov
- Runner-up: (Germany) Tommy Haas
- Score: 6–7^{(7–9)}, 6–4, 6–1

Details
- Draw: 32 (4Q / 3WC)
- Seeds: 8

Events
Singles	men	women
Doubles	men	women
← 2011 ·	Washington Open	· 2013 →

Radek Štěpánek was the defending champion, but opted to play at the London Summer Olympics instead.
Alexandr Dolgopolov defeated Tommy Haas in three sets for the title, 6–7^{(7–9)}, 6–4, 6–1.

== Seeds ==
1. (United States) Mardy Fish (semifinals)
2. (Ukraine) Alexandr Dolgopolov (champion)
3. (South Africa) Kevin Anderson (quarterfinals)
4. (Germany) Tommy Haas (final)
5. (Spain) Pablo Andújar (first round)
6. (France) Jérémy Chardy (second round)
7. (France) Benoît Paire (first round)
8. (United States) Sam Querrey (semifinals)

== Draw ==
=== Key ===
- Q = Qualifier
- WC = Wild card
- LL = Lucky loser
- Alt = Alternate
- SE = Special exempt
- PR = Protected ranking
- ITF = ITF entry
- JE = Junior exempt
- w/o = Walkover
- r = Retired
- d = Defaulted
- SR = Special ranking

=== Finals ===
Semifinals
1	(United States) Mardy Fish	3	5
4	(Germany) Tommy Haas	6	7
8	(United States) Sam Querrey	4	4
2	(Ukraine) Alexandr Dolgopolov	6	6

Final
4	(Germany) Tommy Haas	7^{9}	4	1
2	(Ukraine) Alexandr Dolgopolov	6^{7}	6	6

=== Top half ===
First round
1	(United States) M Fish	4	6	6
(Germany) B Phau	6	1	2
(France) N Mahut	4	5
WC	(Lithuania) R Berankis	6	7
PR	(France) P-H Mathieu	6	2	1
(Belgium) X Malisse	4	6	6
(France) É Roger-Vasselin	6	6^{3}	4
6	(France) J Chardy	3	7^{7}	6
4	(Germany) T Haas	6	6
Q	(United States) M Russell	4	2
(Spain) G García-López	6^{5}	6^{8}
(Argentina) L Mayer	7^{7}	7^{10}
(Australia) M Matosevic	3	7^{7}	6
Q	(United States) J Levine	6	6^{5}	3
(Germany) T Kamke	6	7
7	(France) B Paire	3	5

Second round
1	(United States) M Fish	6	6
WC	(Lithuania) R Berankis	3	1
(Belgium) X Malisse	6	6
6	(France) J Chardy	3	2
4	(Germany) T Haas	6	7
(Argentina) L Mayer	4	5
(Australia) M Matosevic	4	3
(Germany) T Kamke	6	6

Quarterfinals
1	(United States) M Fish	6	6
(Belgium) X Malisse	3	4
4	(Germany) T Haas	6	6
(Germany) T Kamke	1	2

Semifinals
1	(United States) M Fish	3	5
4	(Germany) T Haas	6	7

=== Bottom half ===
First round
8	(United States) S Querrey	7^{7}	6^{2}	7^{7}
(Russia) I Andreev	6^{2}	7^{7}	6^{3}
WC	(United States) S Johnson	4	3
PR	(Germany) B Becker	6	6
Q	(France) F Serra	4	6	6
WC	(United States) B Baker	6	3	4
(Estonia) J Zopp	3	2
3	(South Africa) K Anderson	6	6
5	(Spain) P Andújar	6	2	2
(United States) J Blake	4	6	6
Q	(Switzerland) M Chiudinelli	7	7
(Argentina) H Zeballos	5	5
(Spain) R Ramírez Hidalgo	6	6
(Australia) M Ebden	3	2
(Italy) F Cipolla	1	3
2	(Ukraine) A Dolgopolov	6	6

Second round
8	(United States) S Querrey	6	6
PR	(Germany) B Becker	4	3
Q	(France) F Serra	4	4
3	(South Africa) K Anderson	6	6
(United States) J Blake	6	6
Q	(Switzerland) M Chiudinelli	2	4
(Spain) R Ramírez Hidalgo	1	3
2	(Ukraine) A Dolgopolov	6	6

Quarterfinals
8	(United States) S Querrey	6	6
3	(South Africa) K Anderson	4	4
(United States) J Blake	6^{3}	4
2	(Ukraine) A Dolgopolov	7^{7}	6

Semifinals
8	(United States) S Querrey	4	4
2	(Ukraine) A Dolgopolov	6	6

== Qualifying ==
=== Seeds ===
1. (United States) Michael Russell (qualified)
2. (United States) Jesse Levine (qualified)
3. (Germany) Michael Berrer (qualifying competition)
4. (France) Florent Serra (qualified)
5. (Chile) Paul Capdeville (first round)
6. (Switzerland) Marco Chiudinelli (qualified)
7. (United States) Wayne Odesnik (first round, retired because of exhaustion)
8. (Russia) Teymuraz Gabashvili (qualifying competition)

=== Qualifiers ===
1. (United States) Michael Russell
2. (United States) Jesse Levine
3. (Switzerland) Marco Chiudinelli
4. (France) Florent Serra

=== Draw ===
==== First qualifier ====
First round
1	(United States) Michael Russell	4	6	6
(Germany) Mischa Zverev	6	1	4
WC	(United States) Jarmere Jenkins	4	5
8	(Russia) Teymuraz Gabashvili	6	7

Qualifying competition
1	(United States) Michael Russell	6	6
8	(Russia) Teymuraz Gabashvili	4	1

==== Second qualifier ====
First round
2	(United States) Jesse Levine	6	6
WC	(United States) Evan King	4	4
(United States) Robby Ginepri	6	4
7	(United States) Wayne Odesnik	4	2^{r}

Qualifying competition
2	(United States) Jesse Levine	3	6	7^{7}
(United States) Robby Ginepri	6	3	6^{5}

==== Third qualifier ====
First round
3	(Germany) Michael Berrer	7^{7}	3	7
WC	(United States) Mitchell Frank	6^{5}	6	5
(United States) Tim Smyczek	6	6^{6}	2
6	(Switzerland) Marco Chiudinelli	4	7^{8}	6

Qualifying competition
3	(Germany) Michael Berrer	3	6^{8}
6	(Switzerland) Marco Chiudinelli	6	7^{10}

==== Fourth qualifier ====
First round
4	(France) Florent Serra	7	6
(Brazil) Ricardo Mello	5	2
Alt	(Colombia) Robert Farah	6	2	6
5	(Chile) Paul Capdeville	4	6	4

Qualifying competition
4	(France) Florent Serra	6	4	6
Alt	(Colombia) Robert Farah	4	6	3
