= 2012 Citi Open – Women's doubles =

Women's doubles
- 2012 Citi Open

Final
- Champions: (Japan) Shuko Aoyama (Chinese Taipei) Chang Kai-chen
- Runners-up: (United States) Irina Falconi (South Africa) Chanelle Scheepers
- Score: 7–5, 6–2

Details
- Draw: 16
- Seeds: 4

Events
Singles	men	women
Doubles	men	women
- Citi Open

Sania Mirza and Yaroslava Shvedova were the defending doubles champions, but both opted to play at the London Summer Olympics instead.
The unseeded team of Shuko Aoyama and Chang Kai-chen won the title, defeating Irina Falconi and Chanelle Scheepers 7–5, 6–2 in the final.

== Seeds ==
1. (Belarus) Olga Govortsova / (Russia) Alla Kudryavtseva (semifinals)
2. (Czech Republic) Karolína Plíšková / (Czech Republic) Kristýna Plíšková (semifinals)
3. (United States) Lindsay Lee-Waters / (United States) Megan Moulton-Levy (quarterfinals)
4. (Greece) Eleni Daniilidou / (Italy) Karin Knapp (withdrew because of knee pain for Knapp)

== Draw ==
Key

- Q = Qualifier
- WC = Wild card
- LL = Lucky loser
- Alt = Alternate
- ITF = ITF entry
- PR = Protected ranking
- SR = Special ranking
- SE = Special exempt
- JE = Junior exempt
- JR = Junior Accelerator Programme entrant
- CO = College Accelerator Programme entrant
- NG = Next Gen Accelerator Program entrant
- w/o = Walkover
- r = Retired
- d = Defaulted

=== Draw ===
First round
1	(Belarus) O Govortsova (Russia) A Kudryavtseva	2	6	[10]
(United States) J Elie (Venezuela) G Paz	6	2	[8]
(Latvia) L Dekmeijere (United States) A Mueller	6^{2}	3
(United States) C-Y Hsu (United States) L Litvak	7^{7}	6
4	(Greece) E Daniilidou (Italy) K Knapp
(Romania) E Gallovits-Hall (United States) M Oudin	w/o
(United States) I Falconi (South Africa) C Scheepers	7	6
(Australia) S Bengson (Belgium) T Hendler	5	3
(Japan) S Aoyama (Chinese Taipei) K-c Chang	6	6
WC	(United States) S Kalhorn (United States) A Parra	0	2
(Kazakhstan) S Karatantcheva (Japan) E Sema	1	3
3	(United States) L Lee-Waters (United States) M Moulton-Levy	6	6
(Hungary) M Czink (Slovakia) J Husárová	6	4	[3]
(Russia) A Chakvetadze (United States) S Stephens	1	6	[10]
(Canada) E Bouchard (United States) C Vandeweghe	3	5
2	(Czech Republic) Ka Plíšková (Czech Republic) Kr Plíšková	6	7

Quarterfinals
1	(Belarus) O Govortsova (Russia) A Kudryavtseva	6	6
(United States) C-Y Hsu (United States) L Litvak	4	3
(Romania) E Gallovits-Hall (United States) M Oudin	6	1	[1]
(United States) I Falconi (South Africa) C Scheepers	0	6	[10]
(Japan) S Aoyama (Chinese Taipei) K-c Chang	6	6
3	(United States) L Lee-Waters (United States) M Moulton-Levy	2	2
(Russia) A Chakvetadze (United States) S Stephens	3	2
2	(Czech Republic) Ka Plíšková (Czech Republic) Kr Plíšková	6	6

Semifinals
1	(Belarus) O Govortsova (Russia) A Kudryavtseva	7	3	[5]
(United States) I Falconi (South Africa) C Scheepers	5	6	[10]
(Japan) S Aoyama (Chinese Taipei) K-c Chang	6	6
2	(Czech Republic) Ka Plíšková (Czech Republic) Kr Plíšková	4	3

Final
(United States) I Falconi (South Africa) C Scheepers	5	2
(Japan) S Aoyama (Chinese Taipei) K-c Chang	7	6
