= 2017 Monterrey Open – Singles =

Singles
- 2017 Monterrey Open

Final
- Champion: (Russia) Anastasia Pavlyuchenkova
- Runner-up: (Germany) Angelique Kerber
- Score: 6–4, 2–6, 6–1

Details
- Draw: 32
- Seeds: 8

Events
Singles	Doubles
- Monterrey Open

Heather Watson was the defending champion, but lost in the quarterfinals to Angelique Kerber.

Anastasia Pavlyuchenkova won her fourth title here and for the second time, beating Kerber in the final, with Kerber at the position of world No. 1, in three sets.

== Seeds ==
1. (Germany) Angelique Kerber (final)
2. (Russia) Anastasia Pavlyuchenkova (champion)
3. (France) Caroline Garcia (semifinals)
4. (Spain) Carla Suárez Navarro (semifinals)
5. (Hungary) Tímea Babos (quarterfinals)
6. (Russia) Ekaterina Makarova (second round)
7. (France) Alizé Cornet (quarterfinals)
8. (United States) Christina McHale (first round)

== Draw ==
Key

- Q = Qualifier
- WC = Wild card
- LL = Lucky loser
- Alt = Alternate
- ITF = ITF entry
- PR = Protected ranking
- SR = Special ranking
- SE = Special exempt
- JE = Junior exempt
- JR = Junior Accelerator Programme entrant
- CO = College Accelerator Programme entrant
- NG = Next Gen Accelerator Program entrant
- w/o = Walkover
- r = Retired
- d = Defaulted

=== Finals ===
Semifinals
1	(Germany) Angelique Kerber	7^{8}	6
4	(Spain) Carla Suárez Navarro	6^{6}	1
3	(France) Caroline Garcia	2	4
2	(Russia) Anastasia Pavlyuchenkova	6	6

Final
1	(Germany) Angelique Kerber	4	6	1
2	(Russia) Anastasia Pavlyuchenkova	6	2	6

=== Top half ===
First round
1	(Germany) A Kerber	4	6	6
WC	(Italy) F Schiavone	6	0	4
(Bulgaria) E Kostova	6^{3}	3
(Luxembourg) M Minella	7^{7}	6
(United Kingdom) H Watson	6	6^{7}	6
(Serbia) N Stojanović	2	7^{9}	4
(Czech Republic) D Allertová	4	3
6/WC	(Russia) E Makarova	6	6
4	(Spain) C Suárez Navarro	6	6
(Belgium) A Van Uytvanck	2	4
(Spain) S Sorribes Tormo	7^{10}	6
(Canada) E Bouchard	6^{8}	3
(Croatia) D Vekić	6	6
(Romania) PM Țig	4	1
(Russia) I Khromacheva	1	4
7	(France) A Cornet	6	6

Second round
1	(Germany) A Kerber	6	6
(Luxembourg) M Minella	1	3
(United Kingdom) H Watson	6	6
6/WC	(Russia) E Makarova	4	1
4	(Spain) C Suárez Navarro	6	6
(Spain) S Sorribes Tormo	2	0
(Croatia) D Vekić	3	4
7	(France) A Cornet	6	6

Quarterfinals
1	(Germany) A Kerber	6	6
(United Kingdom) H Watson	4	4
4	(Spain) C Suárez Navarro	6	6
7	(France) A Cornet	1	1

Semifinals
1	(Germany) A Kerber	7^{8}	6
4	(Spain) C Suárez Navarro	6^{6}	1

=== Bottom half ===
First round
8	(United States) C McHale	6	5	4
Q	(Czech Republic) T Martincová	3	7	6
(Japan) N Hibino	0	2
(United States) J Boserup	6	6
(United States) M Brengle	5	6	3
Q	(Argentina) N Podoroska	7	0	6
WC	(Mexico) R Zarazúa	6	2	3
3	(France) C Garcia	4	6	6
5	(Hungary) T Babos	6	6
Q	(Netherlands) L Kerkhove	1	3
(United States) C Bellis	6^{7}	4
(United Kingdom) N Broady	7^{9}	6
Q	(United States) K Ahn	6	6
(Slovakia) J Čepelová	4	2
(Germany) T Maria	1	3
2	(Russia) A Pavlyuchenkova	6	6

Second round
Q	(Czech Republic) T Martincová	3	6	4
(United States) J Boserup	6	4	6
Q	(Argentina) N Podoroska	0	3
3	(France) C Garcia	6	6
5	(Hungary) T Babos	6	6
(United Kingdom) N Broady	3	2
Q	(United States) K Ahn	6^{5}	4
2	(Russia) A Pavlyuchenkova	7^{7}	6

Quarterfinals
(United States) J Boserup	3	2
3	(France) C Garcia	6	6
5	(Hungary) T Babos	2	6	5
2	(Russia) A Pavlyuchenkova	6	3	7

Semifinals
3	(France) C Garcia	2	4
2	(Russia) A Pavlyuchenkova	6	6

== Qualifying ==
=== Seeds ===
1. (Slovenia) Dalila Jakupović (qualifying competition)
2. (United Kingdom) Tara Moore (second round)
3. (Hungary) Dalma Gálfi (first round)
4. (United States) Jamie Loeb (qualifying competition)
5. (Czech Republic) Tereza Martincová (qualified)
6. (Netherlands) Lesley Kerkhove (qualified)
7. (Brazil) Beatriz Haddad Maia (qualifying competition)
8. (Argentina) Nadia Podoroska (qualified)

=== Qualifiers ===
1. (Argentina) Nadia Podoroska
2. (Netherlands) Lesley Kerkhove
3. (United States) Kristie Ahn
4. (Czech Republic) Tereza Martincová

=== Draw ===
==== First qualifier ====
First round
1	(Slovenia) Dalila Jakupović	6	0	6
(Ukraine) Elizaveta Ianchuk	3	6	4
(Russia) Sofya Zhuk	6	6
PR	(Croatia) Tereza Mrdeža	3	2
(France) Chloé Paquet	6	6
(Argentina) Catalina Pella	4	4
PR	(United Kingdom) Samantha Murray	6^{5}	2
8	(Argentina) Nadia Podoroska	7^{7}	6

Second round
1	(Slovenia) Dalila Jakupović	6	1	6
(Russia) Sofya Zhuk	2	6	2
(France) Chloé Paquet	4	6	1^{r}
8	(Argentina) Nadia Podoroska	6	4	3

Qualifying competition
1	(Slovenia) Dalila Jakupović	5	2
8	(Argentina) Nadia Podoroska	7	6

==== Second qualifier ====
First round
2	(United Kingdom) Tara Moore	6	5	7
WC	(Mexico) Marcela Zacarías	2	7	5
(Chile) Daniela Seguel	6	3	1
WC	(Mexico) Victoria Rodríguez	3	6	6
(Portugal) Michelle Larcher de Brito	6	3	6
WC	(Mexico) Giuliana Olmos	3	6	4
(Israel) Deniz Khazaniuk	6	4	5
6	(Netherlands) Lesley Kerkhove	4	6	7

Second round
2	(United Kingdom) Tara Moore	6	2	0
WC	(Mexico) Victoria Rodríguez	3	6	6
(Portugal) Michelle Larcher de Brito	2	6^{5}
6	(Netherlands) Lesley Kerkhove	6	7^{7}

Qualifying competition
WC	(Mexico) Victoria Rodríguez	1	3
6	(Netherlands) Lesley Kerkhove	6	6

==== Third qualifier ====
First round
3	(Hungary) Dalma Gálfi	6^{3}	2
(United States) Kristie Ahn	7^{7}	6
(United States) Danielle Lao	6^{3}	6	5
(Poland) Paula Kania	7^{7}	1	7
(Serbia) Jovana Jakšić	3	5
(United States) Caitlin Whoriskey	6	7
(United States) Jacqueline Cako	2	1
7	(Brazil) Beatriz Haddad Maia	6	6

Second round
(United States) Kristie Ahn	6	6
(Poland) Paula Kania	3	3
(United States) Caitlin Whoriskey	3	6	3
7	(Brazil) Beatriz Haddad Maia	6	2	6

Qualifying competition
(United States) Kristie Ahn	6	7
7	(Brazil) Beatriz Haddad Maia	2	5

==== Fourth qualifier ====
First round
4	(United States) Jamie Loeb	4
(United States) Danielle Collins	3^{r}
(China) Lu Jiajing	6	6
WC	(Mexico) Ana Sofía Sánchez	1	3
(Switzerland) Conny Perrin	6	6^{5}	6
(Georgia (country)) Sofia Shapatava	2	7^{7}	1
(France) Amandine Hesse	3	6	0
5	(Czech Republic) Tereza Martincová	6	4	6

Second round
4	(United States) Jamie Loeb	7	6
(China) Lu Jiajing	5	2
(Switzerland) Conny Perrin	1	6	6^{5}
5	(Czech Republic) Tereza Martincová	6	2	7^{7}

Qualifying competition
4	(United States) Jamie Loeb	6^{2}	2
5	(Czech Republic) Tereza Martincová	7^{7}	6
