= 2012 Citi Open – Women's singles =

Women's singles
- 2012 Citi Open

Final
- Champion: (Slovakia) Magdaléna Rybáriková
- Runner-up: (Russia) Anastasia Pavlyuchenkova
- Score: 6–1, 6–1

Details
- Draw: 32
- Seeds: 8

Events
Singles	men	women
Doubles	men	women
- Citi Open

Nadia Petrova was the defending champion, but opted to play at the London Summer Olympics instead.
Unseeded Magdaléna Rybáriková won the title, defeating top seed Anastasia Pavlyuchenkova 6–1, 6–1, in the final.

== Seeds ==
1. (Russia) Anastasia Pavlyuchenkova (final)
2. (South Africa) Chanelle Scheepers (first round)
3. (United States) Sloane Stephens (semifinals)
4. (United States) Vania King (semifinals)
5. (Czech Republic) Barbora Záhlavová-Strýcová (first round)
6. (Czech Republic) Iveta Benešová (first round)
7. (United States) Coco Vandeweghe (quarterfinals)
8. (Belarus) Olga Govortsova (second round)

== Draw ==
Key

- Q = Qualifier
- WC = Wild card
- LL = Lucky loser
- Alt = Alternate
- ITF = ITF entry
- PR = Protected ranking
- SR = Special ranking
- SE = Special exempt
- JE = Junior exempt
- JR = Junior Accelerator Programme entrant
- CO = College Accelerator Programme entrant
- NG = Next Gen Accelerator Program entrant
- w/o = Walkover
- r = Retired
- d = Defaulted

=== Finals ===
Semifinals
1	(Russia) Anastasia Pavlyuchenkova	4	7	6
4	(United States) Vania King	6	5	4
3	(United States) Sloane Stephens	3	3
(Slovakia) Magdaléna Rybáriková	6	6

Final
1	(Russia) Anastasia Pavlyuchenkova	1	1
(Slovakia) Magdaléna Rybáriková	6	6

=== Top half ===
First round
1	(Russia) A Pavlyuchenkova	6	6
(Serbia) B Jovanovski	4	3
(Hungary) M Czink	7^{7}	6
PR	(Russia) A Chakvetadze	6^{4}	2
(Austria) P Mayr-Achleitner	1	3
(Sweden) J Larsson	6	6
(Chinese Taipei) K-c Chang	6	6
6	(Czech Republic) I Benešová	3	2
4	(United States) V King	6	6
Q	(United States) J Elie	3	4
WC	(Italy) C Giorgi	2	6	4
(United States) I Falconi	6	2	6
(United States) M Oudin	4	7^{7}	6^{5}
Q	(France) A Rezaï	6	6^{2}	7^{7}
(Japan) E Sema	4	1
7/WC	(United States) C Vandeweghe	6	6

Second round
1	(Russia) A Pavlyuchenkova	6	2	6
(Hungary) M Czink	2	6	3
(Sweden) J Larsson	5	4
(Chinese Taipei) K-c Chang	7	6
4	(United States) V King	6	7^{7}
(United States) I Falconi	2	6^{5}
Q	(France) A Rezaï	2	2
7/WC	(United States) C Vandeweghe	6	6

Quarterfinals
1	(Russia) A Pavlyuchenkova	6	6
(Chinese Taipei) K-c Chang	4	4
4	(United States) V King	6	3	6
7/WC	(United States) C Vandeweghe	1	6	4

Semifinals
1	(Russia) A Pavlyuchenkova	4	7	6
4	(United States) V King	6	5	4

=== Bottom half ===
First round
8	(Belarus) O Govortsova	6	6
(Czech Republic) Ka Plíšková	2	2
WC	(Canada) E Bouchard	6	7^{7}
(Italy) K Knapp	2	6^{4}
Q	(Portugal) M Larcher de Brito	6	3	6
(Croatia) M Lučić	3	6	1
(Kazakhstan) S Karatantcheva	3	6	1
3	(United States) S Stephens	6	2	6
5	(Czech Republic) B Záhlavová-Strýcová	5	6	3
(Romania) E Gallovits-Hall	7	4	6
Q	(Slovakia) J Čepelová	3	6	6
(Japan) M Doi	6	3	3
(Greece) E Daniilidou	6	2	6
(Russia) V Dushevina	3	6	2
(Slovakia) M Rybáriková	6	6
2	(South Africa) C Scheepers	2	1

Second round
8	(Belarus) O Govortsova	6	0	3
WC	(Canada) E Bouchard	1	6	6
Q	(Portugal) M Larcher de Brito	2	6	1
3	(United States) S Stephens	6	0	6
(Romania) E Gallovits-Hall	3	4
Q	(Slovakia) J Čepelová	6	6
(Greece) E Daniilidou	3	5
(Slovakia) M Rybáriková	6	7

Quarterfinals
WC	(Canada) E Bouchard	4	4
3	(United States) S Stephens	6	6
Q	(Slovakia) J Čepelová	2	4
(Slovakia) M Rybáriková	6	6

Semifinals
3	(United States) S Stephens	3	3
(Slovakia) M Rybáriková	6	6

== Qualifying ==
=== Seeds ===
1. (France) Aravane Rezaï (qualified)
2. (Portugal) Michelle Larcher de Brito (qualified)
3. (Slovakia) Jana Čepelová (qualified)
4. (United States) Lauren Davis (qualifying competition)
5. (United States) Alison Riske (qualifying competition)
6. (Belgium) Tamaryn Hendler (first round)
7. (Venezuela) Gabriela Paz (qualifying competition)
8. (United States) Jennifer Elie (qualified)

=== Qualifiers ===
1. (France) Aravane Rezai
2. (Portugal) Michelle Larcher de Brito
3. (Slovakia) Jana Čepelová
4. (United States) Jennifer Elie

=== Draw ===
==== First qualifier ====
First round
1	(France) Aravane Rezaï	6	6
WC	(United States) Tornado Alicia Black	1	2
(United States) Chieh-yu Hsu	6	6
6	(Belgium) Tamaryn Hendler	2	3

Qualifying competition
1	(France) Aravane Rezai	6	6
(United States) Chieh-yu Hsu	2	3

==== Second qualifier ====
First round
2	(Portugal) Michelle Larcher de Brito	6	6
WC	(United States) Alessondra Parra	0	3
(United States) Alexandra Kiick	5	3
7	(Venezuela) Gabriela Paz	7	6

Qualifying competition
2	(Portugal) Michelle Larcher de Brito	6	6
7	(Venezuela) Gabriela Paz	2	4

==== Third qualifier ====
First round
3	(Slovakia) Jana Čepelová	3	6	6
(United States) Alexandra Mueller	6	4	1
(United States) Lena Litvak	6^{4}	4
5	(United States) Alison Riske	7^{7}	6

Qualifying competition
3	(Slovakia) Jana Čepelová	5	6	6
5	(United States) Alison Riske	7	1	4

==== Fourth qualifier ====
First round
4	(United States) Lauren Davis	6	6
WC	(United States) Tori Kinard	4	2
WC	(United States) Simone Kalhorn	2	1
8	(United States) Jennifer Elie	6	6

Qualifying competition
4	(United States) Lauren Davis	7	3	4
8	(United States) Jennifer Elie	5	6	6
