= Joanna Tomera =

French tennis player

- Country (sports): France
- Born: 4 August 1999 (age 25)

Singles
- Career record: 0–0
- Career titles: 0

Doubles
- Career record: 0–1
- Career titles: 0
- Last updated on: 22 May 2018.

Joanna Tomera (born 4 August 1999) is a French tennis player.

Tomera made her WTA main draw debut at the 2018 Internationaux de Strasbourg in the doubles draw partnering Wallis Vitis.
