= Wallis Vitis =

French tennis player

- Country (sports): France
- Born: 3 November 1995 (age 29)

Singles
- Career record: 0–0
- Career titles: 0

Doubles
- Career record: 0–1
- Career titles: 0
- Last updated on: 22 May 2018.

Wallis Vitis (born 3 November 1995) is a French tennis player.

Vitis has a career high ITF combined juniors ranking of 340 achieved on 6 February 2012.

Vitis made her WTA main draw debut at the 2018 Internationaux de Strasbourg in the doubles draw partnering Joanna Tomera.
