= Drew Courtney =

American tennis player

- Full name: Andrew Courtney
- Country (sports): United States
- Born: February 3, 1990 (age 35); Clifton, Virginia, U.S.
- Height: 6 ft 5 in (196 cm)
- Plays: Right-handed
- Prize money: $19,673

Doubles
- Career record: 2–3
- Highest ranking: No. 212 (November 26, 2012)

Grand Slam doubles results
- US Open: 1R (2010)

Andrew Courtney (born February 3, 1990) is a former professional tennis player from the United States.

== Biography ==
Born in Clifton, Virginia, Courtney played high school tennis at Robinson Secondary.

In 2008 he started his collegiate tennis career at the University of Virginia, where he became a three-time doubles All-American. The highlight of his career was winning the 2010 NCAA doubles championship with Michael Shabaz, beating second seeds John-Patrick Smith and Davey Sandgren of Tennessee in the final. The pair were granted wildcards into the main draw of the 2010 US Open.

On the professional tour, Courtney reached a best ranking of 212 in the world and twice competed in main draw of the Washington Open ATP Tour tournament. In 2010 he and partner Michael Shabaz came up against the Bryan brothers in a first round match played on center court. They dropped only one service game in a 6–7, 4–6 loss to their highly ranked opponents. He returned to the main draw in 2012, this time partnering Steve Johnson, with whom he made it through to the semi-finals.

Courtney retired from tennis in 2012 and now works as a portfolio analyst for investment firm Brown Advisory in Washington DC.
