= 1995 Internationaux de Strasbourg – Singles =

Singles
- 1995 Internationaux de Strasbourg
- 1994 Champion: (United States) Mary Joe Fernández

Final
- Champion: (United States) Lindsay Davenport
- Runner-up: (Japan) Kimiko Date
- Score: 3–6, 6–1, 6–2

Details
- Draw: 32
- Seeds: 8

Events
Singles	Doubles
← 1994 ·	Internationaux de Strasbourg	· 1996 →

Mary Joe Fernández was the defending champion but lost in the second round to Sandrine Testud.

First-seeded Lindsay Davenport won in the final 3–6, 6–1, 6–2 against Kimiko Date.

== Seeds ==
A champion seed is indicated in bold text while text in italics indicates the round in which that seed was eliminated.

1. (United States) **Lindsay Davenport (champion)**
2. (Japan) Kimiko Date (final)
3. (United States) Mary Joe Fernández (second round)
4. (United States) Amy Frazier (first round)
5. (United States) Lori McNeil (second round)
6. (Austria) Judith Wiesner (quarterfinals)
7. (United States) Marianne Werdel-Witmeyer (second round)
8. (Netherlands) Miriam Oremans (quarterfinals)

== Draw ==
=== Key ===
- Q = Qualifier
- WC = Wild card
- LL = Lucky loser
- Alt = Alternate
- SE = Special exempt
- PR = Protected ranking
- ITF = ITF entry
- JE = Junior exempt
- w/o = Walkover
- r = Retired
- d = Defaulted
- SR = Special ranking

First round
1	(United States) **L Davenport**	**7**	**6**
(Argentina) M Paz	5	2
(France) **A Fusai**	**6**	**6**
(United States) L Poruri	4	0
Q	(Brazil) **A Vieira**	**6**	**6**
Q	(Chinese Taipei) J Lee	3	2
(Mexico) A Gavaldón	1	1
6	(Austria) **J Wiesner**	**6**	**6**
3	(United States) **M J Fernández**	**6**	**6**
(Japan) A Sugiyama	2	3
LL	(Brazil) L Tella	3	4
(France) **S Testud**	**6**	**6**
(South Africa) E Reinach	3	**6**	3
(Netherlands) **S Rottier**	**6**	1	**6**
(France) A D-Balleret	4	**7**	0
7	(United States) **M Werdel-Witmeyer**	**6**	5	**6**
5	(United States) **L McNeil**	**6**	**6**
WC	(France) A-S Bittighoffer	0	1
(United States) A Keller	1	1
(Japan) **Y Kamio**	**6**	**6**
(Japan) **M Endo**	**7**	**6**
(France) L Ghirardi	5	3
(Belgium) **S Appelmans**	**6**	**6**
4	(United States) A Frazier	0	1
8	(Netherlands) **M Oremans**	**7**	**7**
(United States) K Po	5	6
(United States) **T Whitlinger-Jones**	**7**	6	**6**
Q	(France) N Dechy	5	**7**	2
Q	(Canada) M Bernard	0	2
(Australia) **N Bradtke**	**6**	**6**
(Italy) N Baudone	2	3
2	(Japan) **K Date**	**6**	**6**

Second round
1	(United States) **L Davenport**	**6**	**6**
(France) A Fusai	1	1
Q	(Brazil) A Vieira	2	1
6	(Austria) **J Wiesner**	**6**	**6**
3	(United States) M J Fernández	6	4
(France) **S Testud**	**7**	**6**
(Netherlands) **S Rottier**	**6**	**6**
7	(United States) M Werdel-Witmeyer	4	4
5	(United States) L McNeil	3	**6**	3
(Japan) **Y Kamio**	**6**	2	**6**
(Japan) M Endo	2	4
(Belgium) **S Appelmans**	**6**	**6**
8	(Netherlands) **M Oremans**	**6**	**6**
(United States) T Whitlinger-Jones	1	0
(Australia) N Bradtke	4	1
2	(Japan) **K Date**	**6**	**6**

Quarterfinals
1	(United States) **L Davenport**	2	**6**	**7**
6	(Austria) J Wiesner	**6**	4	5
(France) **S Testud**	**6**	4	**6**
(Netherlands) S Rottier	4	**6**	1
(Japan) **Y Kamio**	**6**	**6**
(Belgium) S Appelmans	4	3
8	(Netherlands) M Oremans	2	4
2	(Japan) **K Date**	**6**	**6**

Semifinals
1	(United States) **L Davenport**	**6**	**6**
(France) S Testud	1	4
(Japan) Y Kamio	4	2
2	(Japan) **K Date**	**6**	**6**

Final
1	(United States) **Lindsay Davenport**	3	**6**	**6**
2	(Japan) Kimiko Date	**6**	1	2
