= 1994 Internationaux de Strasbourg – Doubles =

Doubles
- 1994 Internationaux de Strasbourg

Final
- Champions: (United States) Lori McNeil (Australia) Rennae Stubbs
- Runners-up: (Argentina) Patricia Tarabini (Netherlands) Caroline Vis
- Score: 6–3, 3–6, 6–2

Details
- Draw: 16 (1WC/1Q)
- Seeds: 4

Events
Singles	Doubles
← 1993 ·	Internationaux de Strasbourg	· 1995 →

Shaun Stafford and Andrea Temesvári were the defending champions, but Temesvári did not compete this year. Stafford teamed up with Jill Hetherington and lost in the semifinals to Lori McNeil and Rennae Stubbs.

McNeil and Stubbs won the title by defeating Patricia Tarabini and Caroline Vis 6–3, 3–6, 6–2 in the final.

== Seeds ==
1. (United States) Lori McNeil / (Australia) Rennae Stubbs (champions)
2. (United States) Mary Joe Fernández / (United States) Ann Grossman (first round)
3. (Canada) Jill Hetherington / (United States) Shaun Stafford (semifinals)
4. (Argentina) Patricia Tarabini / (Netherlands) Caroline Vis (final)

== Draw ==
=== Key ===
- Q = Qualifier
- WC = Wild card
- LL = Lucky loser
- Alt = Alternate
- SE = Special exempt
- PR = Protected ranking
- ITF = ITF entry
- JE = Junior exempt
- w/o = Walkover
- r = Retired
- d = Defaulted
- SR = Special ranking

=== Draw ===
First round
1	(United States) L McNeil (Australia) R Stubbs	6	6
(Netherlands) I Driehuis (Mexico) L Novelo	4	2
(Australia) R McQuillan (Netherlands) M Oremans	6	6
(Australia) L Field (South Africa) T Price	3	4
3	(Canada) J Hetherington (United States) S Stafford	6	6^{6}	6
(Czech Republic) P Holubová (Czech Republic) S Štefková	2	7^{8}	3
(Croatia) M Murić (United States) B Nagelsen	6	6
Q	(Canada) S Jeyaseelan (South Korea) Lee Mi-jeong	3	1
(Belgium) S Appelmans (Belgium) L Courtois	7	7^{7}
(Sweden) M Lindström (Sweden) M Strandlund	5	6^{0}
(Japan) K Nagatsuka (Japan) N Sawamatsu	1	2
4	(Argentina) P Tarabini (Netherlands) C Vis	6	6
(France) K Quentrec (France) S Testud	6	6
WC	(France) AS Bittighoffer (France) Ann Ehrmann	1	2
(Australia) C Barclay (Australia) KA Guse	4	6	6
2	(United States) MJ Fernández (United States) A Grossman	6	3	4

Quarterfinals
1	(United States) L McNeil (Australia) R Stubbs	7	6
(Australia) R McQuillan (Netherlands) M Oremans	5	3
3	(Canada) J Hetherington (United States) S Stafford	6	6^{5}	6
(Croatia) M Murić (United States) B Nagelsen	4	7^{7}	3
(Belgium) S Appelmans (Belgium) L Courtois
4	(Argentina) P Tarabini (Netherlands) C Vis	w/o
(France) K Quentrec (France) S Testud	4	6	6
(Australia) C Barclay (Australia) KA Guse	6	4	0

Semifinals
1	(United States) L McNeil (Australia) R Stubbs	6	7^{9}
3	(Canada) J Hetherington (United States) S Stafford	1	6^{7}
4	(Argentina) P Tarabini (Netherlands) C Vis	6	6^{9}	6
(France) K Quentrec (France) S Testud	4	7^{11}	4

Final
1	(United States) L McNeil (Australia) R Stubbs	6	3	6
4	(Argentina) P Tarabini (Netherlands) C Vis	3	6	2
