= 1987 Grand Prix de Strasbourg – Singles =

Singles
- 1987 Grand Prix de Strasbourg

Final
- Champion: (Canada) Carling Bassett
- Runner-up: (Italy) Sandra Cecchini
- Score: 6–3, 6–4

Details
- Draw: 32 (4Q/1LL)
- Seeds: 8

Events
Singles	Doubles
Internationaux de Strasbourg	· 1988 →

In the inaugural edition of the tournament, Carling Bassett won the title by defeating Sandra Cecchini 6–3, 6–4 in the final.

== Seeds ==
1. (United States) Stephanie Rehe (second round)
2. (United States) Terry Phelps (quarterfinals)
3. (Australia) Dianne Balestrat (first round)
4. (Canada) Carling Bassett (champion)
5. (Canada) Helen Kelesi (second round)
6. (United States) Gigi Fernández (first round)
7. (France) Nathalie Tauziat (semifinals)
8. (United States) Ann Henricksson (second round)

== Draw ==
Key

- Q = Qualifier
- WC = Wild card
- LL = Lucky loser
- Alt = Alternate
- ITF = ITF entry
- PR = Protected ranking
- SR = Special ranking
- SE = Special exempt
- JE = Junior exempt
- JR = Junior Accelerator Programme entrant
- CO = College Accelerator Programme entrant
- NG = Next Gen Accelerator Program entrant
- w/o = Walkover
- r = Retired
- d = Defaulted

=== Finals ===
Semifinals
(Italy) Sandra Cecchini	6	7
(United States) Kathleen Horvath	0	6
4	(Canada) Carling Bassett	6	6
7	(France) Nathalie Tauziat	0	1

Final
(Italy) Sandra Cecchini	3	4
4	(Canada) Carling Bassett	6	6

=== Top half ===
First round
1	(United States) S Rehe	2	6	6
(France) N Herreman	6	4	2
(West Germany) I Cueto	6	6
(Czechoslovakia) J Novotná	4	1
(France) I Demongeot	4	2
(Italy) S Cecchini	6	6
(Netherlands) M Mesker	2	6	1
5	(Canada) H Kelesi	6	4	6
3	(Australia) D Balestrat	4	3
(United States) K Horvath	6	6
(United States) B Herr	6	4	0
Q	(Austria) B Paulus	2	6	6
(Greece) A Kanellopoulou	3	3
(United States) E Burgin	6	6
(United States) M Van Nostrand	1	2
8	(United States) A Henricksson	6	6

Second round
1	(United States) S Rehe	4	2
(West Germany) I Cueto	6	6
(Italy) S Cecchini	7	5	6
5	(Canada) H Kelesi	5	7	3
(United States) K Horvath	7	3	6
Q	(Austria) B Paulus	5	6	4
(United States) E Burgin	6	6	6
8	(United States) A Henricksson	7	3	4

Quarterfinals
(West Germany) I Cueto	2	3
(Italy) S Cecchini	6	6
(United States) K Horvath	2	6	6
(United States) E Burgin	6	2	1

Semifinals
(Italy) S Cecchini	6	7
(United States) K Horvath	0	6

=== Bottom half ===
First round
6	(United States) G Fernández	4	5
(Austria) J Wiesner	6	7
(Romania) V Ruzici	6	6
Q	(Netherlands) C Bakkum	4	4
(Brazil) P Medrado	6	4	3
Q	(Japan) A Kijimuta	3	6	6
LL	(Sweden) M Lindström	0	5
4	(Canada) C Bassett	6	7
7	(France) N Tauziat	6	6
(United States) G Kim	3	0
Q	(United Kingdom) C Wood	6	7
(France) A Dechaume	4	5
(United States) V Nelson-Dunbar	5	6	1
(France) C Suire	7	2	6
(Argentina) A Villagrán	0	1
2	(United States) T Phelps	6	6

Second round
(Austria) J Wiesner	2	1
(Romania) V Ruzici	6	6
Q	(Japan) A Kijimuta	6	6	1
4	(Canada) C Bassett	1	7	6
7	(France) N Tauziat	7	6
Q	(United Kingdom) C Wood	5	2
(France) C Suire	3	6
2	(United States) T Phelps	6	7

Quarterfinals
(Romania) V Ruzici	4	5
4	(Canada) C Bassett	6	7
7	(France) N Tauziat	4	6	6
2	(United States) T Phelps	6	2	4

Semifinals
4	(Canada) C Bassett	6	6
7	(France) N Tauziat	0	1
