= 1987 Grand Prix de Strasbourg – Doubles =

Doubles
- 1987 Grand Prix de Strasbourg

Final
- Champions: (Czechoslovakia) Jana Novotná (France) Catherine Suire
- Runners-up: (United States) Kathleen Horvath (Netherlands) Marcella Mesker
- Score: 6–0, 6–2

Details
- Draw: 15
- Seeds: 4

Events
| Singles | Doubles |
| Internationaux de Strasbourg | · 1988 → |

In the inaugural edition of the tournament, Jana Novotná and Catherine Suire won the title by defeating Kathleen Horvath and Marcella Mesker 6–0, 6–2 in the final.

== Seeds ==
The top seed received a bye to the quarterfinals.

1. (United States) Gigi Fernández / (United States) Beth Herr (quarterfinals)
2. (France) Isabelle Demongeot / (France) Nathalie Tauziat (first round)
3. (Czechoslovakia) Jana Novotná / (France) Catherine Suire (champions)
4. (United States) Kathleen Horvath / (Netherlands) Marcella Mesker (final)

== Draw ==
Key

- Q = Qualifier
- WC = Wild card
- LL = Lucky loser
- Alt = Alternate
- ITF = ITF entry
- PR = Protected ranking
- SR = Special ranking
- SE = Special exempt
- JE = Junior exempt
- JR = Junior Accelerator Programme entrant
- CO = College Accelerator Programme entrant
- NG = Next Gen Accelerator Program entrant
- w/o = Walkover
- r = Retired
- d = Defaulted

=== Draw ===
First round
(Canada) H Kelesi (Romania) V Ruzici | 6 | 6
(Greece) A Kanellopoulou (United States) S Mascarin | 2 | 2
3 | (Czechoslovakia) J Novotná (France) C Suire | 6 | 6
(Netherlands) M Bollegraf (Sweden) M Lindström | 2 | 4
(United States) V Nelson-Dunbar (Austria) J Wiesner | 1 | 3
(Japan) A Kijimuta (Japan) E Okagawa | 6 | 6
(France) S Amiach (France) N Herreman | 3 | 6 | 6
(Brazil) P Medrado (Argentina) A Villagrán | 6 | 2 | 2
(Australia) D Balestrat (United States) T Phelps | 1 | 3
4 | (United States) K Horvath (Netherlands) M Mesker | 6 | 6
(France) A Dechaume (France) Ann Ehrmann | 4 | 2
(Canada) C Bassett (United States) S Rehe | 6 | 6
(United States) A Henricksson (United States) M Van Nostrand | 6 | 4 | 6
2 | (France) I Demongeot (France) N Tauziat | 2 | 6 | 3

Quarterfinals
1 | (United States) G Fernández (United States) B Herr | 6 | 5 | 2
(Canada) H Kelesi (Romania) V Ruzici | 3 | 7 | 6
3 | (Czechoslovakia) J Novotná (France) C Suire | 6 | 6
(Japan) A Kijimuta (Japan) E Okagawa | 2 | 4
(France) S Amiach (France) N Herreman | 1 | 1
4 | (United States) K Horvath (Netherlands) M Mesker | 6 | 6
(Canada) C Bassett (United States) S Rehe
(United States) A Henricksson (United States) M Van Nostrand | w/o

Semifinals
(Canada) H Kelesi (Romania) V Ruzici | 3 | 6 | 2
3 | (Czechoslovakia) J Novotná (France) C Suire | 6 | 4 | 6
4 | (United States) K Horvath (Netherlands) M Mesker | 6 | 6
(United States) A Henricksson (United States) M Van Nostrand | 2 | 1

Final
3 | (Czechoslovakia) J Novotná (France) C Suire | 6 | 6
4 | (United States) K Horvath (Netherlands) M Mesker | 0 | 2
