= 1992 Internationaux de Strasbourg – Singles =

Singles
- 1992 Internationaux de Strasbourg

Final
- Champion: (Austria) Judith Wiesner
- Runner-up: (Japan) Naoko Sawamatsu
- Score: 6–1, 6–3

Details
- Draw: 28 (2WC/4Q/1LL)
- Seeds: 8

Events
Singles	Doubles
← 1991 ·	Internationaux de Strasbourg	· 1993 →

Radka Zrubáková was the defending champion, but did not compete this year.

Judith Wiesner won the title by defeating Naoko Sawamatsu 6–1, 6–3 in the final.

== Seeds ==
The first four seeds received a bye to the second round.

1. (Japan) Kimiko Date (second round)
2. (Austria) Judith Wiesner (champion)
3. (United States) Lori McNeil (second round)
4. (Commonwealth of Independent States) Natalia Medvedeva (second round)
5. (Japan) Naoko Sawamatsu (final)
6. (Czechoslovakia) Andrea Strnadová (second round)
7. (Italy) Sandra Cecchini (second round)
8. (United States) Debbie Graham (quarterfinals)

== Draw ==
=== Key ===
- Q = Qualifier
- WC = Wild card
- LL = Lucky loser
- Alt = Alternate
- SE = Special exempt
- PR = Protected ranking
- ITF = ITF entry
- JE = Junior exempt
- w/o = Walkover
- r = Retired
- d = Defaulted
- SR = Special ranking

=== Finals ===
Semifinals
(South Africa) Mariaan de Swardt	3	3
5	(Japan) Naoko Sawamatsu	6	6
(Argentina) Bettina Fulco Villella	1	1
2	(Austria) Judith Wiesner	6	6

Final
5	(Japan) Naoko Sawamatsu	1	3
2	(Austria) Judith Wiesner	6	6

=== Top half ===
First round
(Hungary) A Földényi	1	6	2
(South Africa) M de Swardt	6	1	6
(Australia) J Byrne	2	7^{8}	2
Q	(Germany) J Jehs	6	6^{6}	6
Q	(United States) J Santrock	2	7^{7}	4
8/WC	(United States) D Graham	6	6^{5}	6
(United States) A Keller	5	6	1
(France) S Testud	7	3	6
(United States) D Faber	6^{5}	6^{4}
(United States) H Cioffi	7^{7}	7^{7}
LL	(United States) J Emmons	2	3
5	(Japan) N Sawamatsu	6	6

Second round
1	(Japan) K Date	6^{5}	3
(South Africa) M de Swardt	7^{7}	6
Q	(Germany) J Jehs	2	7^{7}	4
8/WC	(United States) D Graham	6	6^{5}	6
4	(Commonwealth of Independent States) N Medvedeva	1	3
(France) S Testud	6	6
(United States) H Cioffi	4	4
5	(Japan) N Sawamatsu	6	6

Quarterfinals
(South Africa) M de Swardt	6	3	6
8/WC	(United States) D Graham	3	6	3
(France) S Testud	3	6	5
5	(Japan) N Sawamatsu	6	3	7

Semifinals
(South Africa) M de Swardt	3	3
5	(Japan) N Sawamatsu	6	6

=== Bottom half ===
First round
7	(Italy) S Cecchini	6	6
(Japan) A Kijimuta	4	2
WC	(Argentina) M Paz	6	3	7
(France) N Herreman	2	6	5
Q	(France) A Fusai	7	3	4
(Argentina) B Fulco Villella	5	6	6
6	(Czechoslovakia) A Strnadová	6	6
Q	(United States) S Martin	3	0
(Argentina) F Labat	6	6
(United States) A Grossman	0	2
(France) P Paradis-Mangon	6	6
(Italy) K Piccolini	3	4

Second round
7	(Italy) S Cecchini	1	1
WC	(Argentina) M Paz	6	6
(Argentina) B Fulco Villella	6	7
3	(United States) L McNeil	4	5
6	(Czechoslovakia) A Strnadová	3	5
(Argentina) F Labat	6	7
(France) P Paradis-Mangon	6	0	2
2	(Austria) J Wiesner	2	6	6

Quarterfinals
WC	(Argentina) M Paz	6	5	1
(Argentina) B Fulco Villella	1	7	6
(Argentina) F Labat	6	4	3
2	(Austria) J Wiesner	4	6	6

Semifinals
(Argentina) B Fulco Villella	1	1
2	(Austria) J Wiesner	6	6
