= 1990 Internationaux de Strasbourg – Doubles =

Doubles
- 1990 Internationaux de Strasbourg

Final
- Champions: (Australia) Nicole Provis (South Africa) Elna Reinach
- Runners-up: (United States) Kathy Jordan (Australia) Elizabeth Smylie
- Score: 6–1, 6–4

Details
- Draw: 16
- Seeds: 4

Events
Singles	Doubles
← 1989 ·	Internationaux de Strasbourg	· 1991 →

Mercedes Paz and Judith Wiesner were the defending champions, but Wiesner did not compete this year. Paz teamed up with Manon Bollegraf and lost in the quarterfinals to Sophie Amiach and Nathalie Herreman.

Nicole Provis and Elna Reinach won the title by defeating Kathy Jordan and Elizabeth Smylie 6–1, 6–4 in the final.

== Seeds ==
1. (United States) Kathy Jordan / (Australia) Elizabeth Smylie (final)
2. (Australia) Janine Tremelling / (Soviet Union) Natasha Zvereva (semifinals)
3. (Australia) Nicole Provis / (South Africa) Elna Reinach (champions)
4. (Netherlands) Manon Bollegraf / (Argentina) Mercedes Paz (quarterfinals)

== Draw ==
=== Key ===
- Q = Qualifier
- WC = Wild card
- LL = Lucky loser
- Alt = Alternate
- SE = Special exempt
- PR = Protected ranking
- ITF = ITF entry
- JE = Junior exempt
- w/o = Walkover
- r = Retired
- d = Defaulted
- SR = Special ranking

=== Draw ===
First round
1	(United States) K Jordan (Australia) E Smylie	5	6	6
(France) N van Lottum (United Kingdom) C Wood	7	2	2
(United States) Ca MacGregor (United States) Cy MacGregor	6	6
(France) A Dechaume (France) K Quentrec	4	4
4	(Netherlands) M Bollegraf (Argentina) M Paz	6	6
(Japan) M Kidowaki (Australia) A Scott	4	2
(Australia) JA Faull (Australia) R McQuillan	2	3
(France) S Amiach (France) N Herreman	6	6
(United States) C Benjamin (United States) A Grossman	3	4
(Australia) M Jaggard (United States) H Na	6	6
(South Africa) L Gregory (United States) G Magers	6	6	0
3	(Australia) N Provis (South Africa) E Reinach	2	7	6
(Argentina) F Labat (Argentina) P Tarabini	6	6
(France) P Paradis (France) C Suire	4	2
(United States) L Allen (Australia) K Radford	0	2
2	(Australia) J Tremelling (Soviet Union) N Zvereva	6	6

Quarterfinals
1	(United States) K Jordan (Australia) E Smylie	6	6
(United States) Ca MacGregor (United States) Cy MacGregor	3	1
4	(Netherlands) M Bollegraf (Argentina) M Paz	6	6
(France) S Amiach (France) N Herreman	7	7
(Australia) M Jaggard (United States) H Na	2	6	2
3	(Australia) N Provis (South Africa) E Reinach	6	3	6
(Argentina) F Labat (Argentina) P Tarabini	3	1
2	(Australia) J Tremelling (Soviet Union) N Zvereva	6	6

Semifinals
1	(United States) K Jordan (Australia) E Smylie	6	6
(France) S Amiach (France) N Herreman	4	4
3	(Australia) N Provis (South Africa) E Reinach	6	1	6
2	(Australia) J Tremelling (Soviet Union) N Zvereva	3	6	1

Final
1	(United States) K Jordan (Australia) E Smylie	1	4
3	(Australia) N Provis (South Africa) E Reinach	6	6
