= 1994 Internationaux de Strasbourg – Singles =

Singles
- 1994 Internationaux de Strasbourg

Final
- Champion: (United States) Mary Joe Fernández
- Runner-up: (Argentina) Gabriela Sabatini
- Score: 2–6, 6–4, 6–0

Details
- Draw: 28 (1WC/4Q/1LL)
- Seeds: 8

Events
Singles	Doubles
← 1993 ·	Internationaux de Strasbourg	· 1995 →

Naoko Sawamatsu was the defending champion, but lost in the quarterfinals to Kimiko Date.

Mary Joe Fernández won the title by defeating Gabriela Sabatini 2–6, 6–4, 6–0 in the final.

== Seeds ==
The first four seeds received a bye into the second round.

1. (Argentina) Gabriela Sabatini (final)
2. (Japan) Kimiko Date (semifinals)
3. (United States) Mary Joe Fernández (champion)
4. (Belgium) Sabine Appelmans (quarterfinals)
5. (Japan) Naoko Sawamatsu (quarterfinals)
6. (Croatia) Iva Majoli (quarterfinals)
7. (Austria) Judith Wiesner (semifinals)
8. (United States) Lori McNeil (quarterfinals)

== Draw ==
=== Key ===
- Q = Qualifier
- WC = Wild card
- LL = Lucky loser
- Alt = Alternate
- SE = Special exempt
- PR = Protected ranking
- ITF = ITF entry
- JE = Junior exempt
- w/o = Walkover
- r = Retired
- d = Defaulted
- SR = Special ranking

=== Finals ===
Semifinals
1	(Argentina) Gabriela Sabatini	6	4	6
7	(Austria) Judith Wiesner	4	6	3
3	(United States) Mary Joe Fernández	3	6	6
2	(Japan) Kimiko Date	6	4	1

Final
1	(Argentina) Gabriela Sabatini	6	4	0
3	(United States) Mary Joe Fernández	2	6	6

=== Top half ===
First round
(United States) G Helgeson	4	5
(France) A Fusai	6	7
LL	(United States) A Keller	5	1
WC	(France) I Demongeot	7	6
(Belgium) D Monami	6	2	2
6	(Croatia) I Majoli	3	6	6
Q	(France) A Castéra	4	0
Q	(France) A Dechaume	6	6
(Austria) S Plischke	3	5
(Japan) K Nagatsuka	6	7
(Mexico) A Gavaldón	3	1
7	(Austria) J Wiesner	6	6

Second round
1	(Argentina) G Sabatini	6	6
(France) A Fusai	1	1
WC	(France) I Demongeot	2	1
6	(Croatia) I Majoli	6	6
4	(Belgium) S Appelmans	7	6
Q	(France) A Dechaume	5	2
(Japan) K Nagatsuka	0	2
7	(Austria) J Wiesner	6	6

Quarterfinals
1	(Argentina) G Sabatini	6	4	6
6	(Croatia) I Majoli	3	6	2
4	(Belgium) S Appelmans	4	6^{4}
7	(Austria) J Wiesner	6	7^{7}

Semifinals
1	(Argentina) G Sabatini	6	4	6
7	(Austria) J Wiesner	4	6	3

=== Bottom half ===
First round
8	(United States) L McNeil	6	7^{8}
Q	(Sweden) M Strandlund	2	6^{6}
(United States) S Stafford	4	6	6
(Netherlands) S Rottier	6	4	2
(France) S Testud	6	6
(Netherlands) M Oremans	1	2
5	(Japan) N Sawamatsu	6	7^{7}
(Slovakia) K Studeníková	1	6^{2}
(Austria) B Schett	4	6	6
(Czech Republic) K Kroupová	6	3	3
Q	(Brazil) A Vieira	5	2
(Sweden) Å Carlsson	7	6

Second round
8	(United States) L McNeil	0	6	6
(United States) S Stafford	6	2	3
(France) S Testud	3	6^{5}
3	(United States) MJ Fernández	6	7^{7}
5	(Japan) N Sawamatsu	4	6	6
(Austria) B Schett	6	4	1
(Sweden) Å Carlsson	6	4	2
2	(Japan) K Date	4	6	6

Quarterfinals
8	(United States) L McNeil	4	6	3
3	(United States) MJ Fernández	6	4	6
5	(Japan) N Sawamatsu	3	4
2	(Japan) K Date	6	6

Semifinals
3	(United States) MJ Fernández	3	6	6
2	(Japan) K Date	6	4	1
