= 1990 Internationaux de Strasbourg – Singles =

Singles
- 1990 Internationaux de Strasbourg

Final
- Champion: (Argentina) Mercedes Paz
- Runner-up: (United States) Ann Grossman
- Score: 6–2, 6–3

Details
- Draw: 32 (4Q/1LL)
- Seeds: 8

Events
Singles	Doubles
← 1989 ·	Internationaux de Strasbourg	· 1991 →

Jana Novotná was the defending champion, but did not compete this year.

Mercedes Paz won the title by defeating Ann Grossman 6–2, 6–3 in the final.

== Seeds ==
1. (West Germany) Isabel Cueto (quarterfinals)
2. (United States) Gretchen Magers (second round)
3. (Netherlands) Manon Bollegraf (semifinals)
4. (Australia) Rachel McQuillan (second round)
5. (Mexico) Angélica Gavaldón (first round)
6. (West Germany) Wiltrud Probst (second round)
7. (Australia) Nicole Provis (first round)
8. (Argentina) Patricia Tarabini (first round)

== Draw ==
=== Key ===
- Q = Qualifier
- WC = Wild card
- LL = Lucky loser
- Alt = Alternate
- SE = Special exempt
- PR = Protected ranking
- ITF = ITF entry
- JE = Junior exempt
- w/o = Walkover
- r = Retired
- d = Defaulted
- SR = Special ranking

=== Finals ===
Semifinals
(Argentina) Mercedes Paz	6	6
(France) Karine Quentrec	1	1
3	(Netherlands) Manon Bollegraf	6	0	2
(United States) Ann Grossman	2	6	6

Final
(Argentina) Mercedes Paz	6	6
(United States) Ann Grossman	2	3

=== Top half ===
First round
1	(West Germany) I Cueto	7	6
(United States) C Benjamin	6	1
(France) V Batut	4	6	6
(Australia) J Faull	6	4	4
(Argentina) B Fulco	7	6
(United Kingdom) M Javer	5	0
(Argentina) M Paz	7	7
7	(Australia) N Provis	5	6
4	(Australia) R McQuillan	6	6
(United States) H Na	3	1
Q	(France) S Amiach	3	1
(France) K Quentrec	6	6
LL	(West Germany) V Martinek	4	6	7
(Argentina) F Haumüller	6	3	5
(Italy) B Romanò	6	6
5	(Mexico) A Gavaldón	1	1

Second round
1	(West Germany) I Cueto	6	6
(France) V Batut	1	0
(Argentina) B Fulco	1	4
(Argentina) M Paz	6	6
4	(Australia) R McQuillan	6	3	6
(France) K Quentrec	3	6	7
LL	(West Germany) V Martinek	6	6
(Italy) B Romanò	4	4

Quarterfinals
1	(West Germany) I Cueto	1	0
(Argentina) M Paz	6	6
(France) K Quentrec	6	7	6
LL	(West Germany) V Martinek	7	6	2

Semifinals
(Argentina) M Paz	6	6
(France) K Quentrec	1	1

=== Bottom half ===
First round
6	(West Germany) W Probst	2	6	6
(South Africa) E Reinach	6	4	1
(Argentina) F Labat	6	6
(United States) C MacGregor	4	3
(Japan) M Kidowaki	6	0
Q	(France) A Dechaume	7	6
(France) N Herreman	4	6	4
3	(Netherlands) M Bollegraf	6	2	6
8	(Argentina) P Tarabini	6	6
(Bulgaria) E Pampoulova	7	7
(France) P Paradis	1	3
Q	(United States) A Keller	6	6
(Sweden) M Strandlund	6	2	0
(United States) A Grossman	0	6	6
Q	(Canada) C Bassett-Seguso	6	3	3
2	(United States) G Magers	1	6	6

Second round
6	(West Germany) W Probst	7	2	1
(Argentina) F Labat	5	6	6
Q	(France) A Dechaume	2	3
3	(Netherlands) M Bollegraf	6	6
(Bulgaria) E Pampoulova	6	6
Q	(United States) A Keller	4	4
(United States) A Grossman	6	6
2	(United States) G Magers	3	4

Quarterfinals
(Argentina) F Labat	1	6
3	(Netherlands) M Bollegraf	6	7
(Bulgaria) E Pampoulova	1	3
(United States) A Grossman	6	6

Semifinals
3	(Netherlands) M Bollegraf	6	0	2
(United States) A Grossman	2	6	6
