= 1991 Internationaux de Strasbourg =

- Date: 20–26 May
- Edition: 5th
- Category: Tier IV
- Draw: 28S / 16D
- Prize money: $150,000
- Surface: Clay / outdoor
- Location: Strasbourg, France
- Venue: Ligue d'Alsace de Tenis

Champions

Singles
- (Czechoslovakia) Radka Zrubáková

Doubles
- (United States) Lori McNeil / (United States) Stephanie Rehe
← 1990 ·	Internationaux de Strasbourg	· 1992 →

The 1991 Internationaux de Strasbourg was a women's tennis tournament played on outdoor clay courts at the Ligue d'Alsace de Tenis in Strasbourg, France that was part of Tier IV of the 1991 WTA Tour. It was the fifth edition of the tournament and was held from 20 May until 26 May 1991. Unseeded Radka Zrubáková won the singles title and earned $27,000 first-prize money.

== Finals ==
=== Singles ===
(Czechoslovakia) Radka Zrubáková defeated (Australia) Rachel McQuillan 7–6^{(7–3)}, 7–6^{(7–3)}

- It was Zrubáková's 1st title of the year and the 2nd of her career.

=== Doubles ===
(United States) Lori McNeil / (United States) Stephanie Rehe defeated (Netherlands) Manon Bollegraf / (Argentina) Mercedes Paz 6–7^{(2–7)}, 6–4, 6–4
