= 1989 Internationaux de Strasbourg =

- Date: 22–28 May
- Edition: 3rd
- Category: Category 2
- Draw: 32S / 16D
- Prize money: $100,000
- Surface: Clay / outdoor
- Location: Strasbourg, France

Champions

Singles
- (Czechoslovakia) Jana Novotná

Doubles
- (Argentina) Mercedes Paz / (Austria) Judith Wiesner
| ← 1988 · | Internationaux de Strasbourg | · 1990 → |

The 1989 Internationaux de Strasbourg was a women's tennis tournament played on outdoor clay courts in Strasbourg, France that was part of the Category 2 tier of the 1989 WTA Tour. It was the third edition of the tournament and was held from 22 May until 28 May 1989. Second-seeded Jana Novotná won the singles title.

== Finals ==
=== Singles ===
(Czechoslovakia) Jana Novotná defeated (Argentina) Patricia Tarabini 6–1, 6–2

- It was Novotná's 6th title of the year and the 18th of her career.

=== Doubles ===
(Argentina) Mercedes Paz / (Austria) Judith Wiesner defeated (South Africa) Lise Gregory / (United States) Gretchen Magers 6–3, 6–3

- It was Paz's 2nd title of the year and the 14th of her career. It was Wiesner's 1st title of the year and the 4th of her career.
