= 1989 Internationaux de Strasbourg – Doubles =

Doubles
- 1989 Internationaux de Strasbourg
- 1988 Champions: (Netherlands) Manon Bollegraf (Australia) Nicole Provis

Final
- Champions: (Argentina) Mercedes Paz (Austria) Judith Wiesner
- Runners-up: (South Africa) Lise Gregory (United States) Gretchen Magers
- Score: 6–3, 6–3

Details
- Draw: 16
- Seeds: 4

Events
Singles	Doubles
← 1988 ·	Internationaux de Strasbourg	· 1990 →

Manon Bollegraf and Nicole Provis were the defending champions but they competed with different partners that year, Bollegraf with Eva Pfaff and Provis with Elna Reinach.

Bollegraf and Pfaff lost in the first round to Jo-Anne Faull and Rachel McQuillan.

Provis and Reinach lost in the quarterfinals to Neige Dias and Adriana Villagrán.

Mercedes Paz and Judith Wiesner won in the final 6–3, 6–3 against Lise Gregory and Gretchen Magers.

== Seeds ==
Champion seeds are indicated in bold text while text in italics indicates the round in which those seeds were eliminated.

1. (Netherlands) Manon Bollegraf / (West Germany) Eva Pfaff (first round)
2. (Australia) Nicole Provis / (South Africa) Elna Reinach (quarterfinals)
3. (Argentina) **Mercedes Paz** / (Austria) **Judith Wiesner (champions)**
4. (France) Nathalie Herreman / (France) Catherine Suire (quarterfinals)

== Draw ==
=== Key ===
- Q = Qualifier
- WC = Wild card
- LL = Lucky loser
- Alt = Alternate
- SE = Special exempt
- PR = Protected ranking
- ITF = ITF entry
- JE = Junior exempt
- w/o = Walkover
- r = Retired
- d = Defaulted
- SR = Special ranking

First round

Quarterfinals

Semifinals

Final

1
- (Netherlands) M Bollegraf
- (West Germany) E Pfaff
3
1

- (Australia) **J-A Faull**
- (Australia) **R McQuillan**
**6**
**6**

- (Australia) **J-A Faull**
- (Australia) **R McQuillan**
**6**
**6**

- (Czechoslovakia) I Budařová
- (Czechoslovakia) R Rajchrtová
3
3

- (Italy) L Ferrando
- (Argentina) P Tarabini
3
3

- (Italy) **L Ferrando**
- (Argentina) **P Tarabini**
**6**
**6**

- (Australia) J-A Faull
- (Australia) R McQuillan
5
3

4
- (France) **N Herreman**
- (France) **C Suire**
**6**
4
**6**

- (South Africa) **L Gregory**
- (United States) **G Magers**
**7**
**6**

- (Czechoslovakia) D Krajčovičová
- (Czechoslovakia) P Langrová
1
**6**
2

4
- (France) N Herreman
- (France) C Suire
1
2

- (United States) A Leand
- (United States) S Sloane
2
1

- (South Africa) **L Gregory**
- (United States) **G Magers**
**6**
**6**

- (South Africa) **L Gregory**
- (United States) **G Magers**
**6**
**6**

- (South Africa) Lise Gregory
- (United States) Gretchen Magers
3
3

- (Australia) **L Field**
- (United States) **T Phelps**
**6**
1
**6**

3
- (Argentina) **Mercedes Paz**
- (Austria) **Judith Wiesner**
**6**
**6**

- (Belgium) A Devries
- (Australia) M Jaggard
2
**6**
3

- (Australia) L Field
- (United States) T Phelps
5
1

- (Japan) A Kijimuta
- (United States) M Torres
2
3

3
- (Argentina) **M Paz**
- (Austria) **J Wiesner**
**7**
**6**

3
- (Argentina) **M Paz**
- (Austria) **J Wiesner**
**6**
**6**

3
- (Argentina) **M Paz**
- (Austria) **J Wiesner**
**6**
**6**

- (United States) E Hakami
- (South Africa) K Schimper
**6**
3
3

- (Brazil) N Dias
- (Argentina) A Villagrán
2
1

- (Brazil) **N Dias**
- (Argentina) **A Villagrán**
2
**6**
**6**

- (Brazil) **N Dias**
- (Argentina) **A Villagrán**
**6**
**6**

- (West Germany) W Probst
- (Belgium) S Wasserman
1
3

2
- (Australia) N Provis
- (South Africa) E Reinach
2
2

2
- (Australia) **N Provis**
- (South Africa) **E Reinach**
**6**
**6**
