= 1993 Internationaux de Strasbourg – Singles =

Singles
- 1993 Internationaux de Strasbourg

Final
- Champion: (Japan) Naoko Sawamatsu
- Runner-up: (Austria) Judith Wiesner
- Score: 4–6, 6–1, 6–3

Details
- Draw: 28 (2WC/4Q/1LL)
- Seeds: 8

Events
Singles	Doubles
← 1992 ·	Internationaux de Strasbourg	· 1994 →

Judith Wiesner was the defending champion, but lost the final 4–6, 6–1, 6–3 to Naoko Sawamatsu. Both players faced each other at the final match in last year.

== Seeds ==
The first five seeds received a bye to the second round.

1. (Czech Republic) Jana Novotná (semifinals)
2. (France) ~~Mary Pierce~~ (withdrew)
3. (United States) Lori McNeil (second round)
4. (Austria) Judith Wiesner (final)
5. (Japan) Naoko Sawamatsu (champion)
6. (Argentina) Florencia Labat (quarterfinals)
7. (Japan) Mana Endo (quarterfinals)
8. (Belgium) Sabine Appelmans (second round)
- (France) Pascale Paradis-Mangon (quarterfinals) took the designated seed spot after Pierce's withdrawal, without being recognized as the 9th seed.

== Draw ==
=== Key ===
- Q = Qualifier
- WC = Wild card
- LL = Lucky loser
- Alt = Alternate
- SE = Special exempt
- PR = Protected ranking
- ITF = ITF entry
- JE = Junior exempt
- w/o = Walkover
- r = Retired
- d = Defaulted
- SR = Special ranking

=== Finals ===
Semifinals
1	(Czech Republic) Jana Novotná	6^{9}	4
4	(Austria) Judith Wiesner	7^{11}	6
5	(Japan) Naoko Sawamatsu	6	6
(France) Sandrine Testud	4	0

Final
4	(Austria) Judith Wiesner	6	1	3
5	(Japan) Naoko Sawamatsu	4	6	6

=== Top half ===
First round
(Germany) V Martinek	2	2
(Czech Republic) K Kroupová	6	6
(United States) K Rinaldi	5	7^{8}	6
LL	(France) A Olivier	7	6^{6}	4
WC	(France) S Amiach	2	0
6	(Argentina) F Labat	6	6
(Belarus) T Ignatieva	0	6	1
(United States) S Stafford	6	4	6
(Mexico) A Gavaldón	7	2	1
(United States) G Helgeson	5	6	6
(Australia) R McQuillan	3	6	1
8	(Belgium) S Appelmans	6	4	6

Second round
1	(Czech Republic) J Novotná	7	6
(Czech Republic) K Kroupová	5	1
(United States) K Rinaldi	2	5
6	(Argentina) F Labat	6	7
4	(Austria) J Wiesner	6	6
(United States) S Stafford	3	0
(United States) G Helgeson	4	7	6
8	(Belgium) S Appelmans	6	5	3

Quarterfinals
1	(Czech Republic) J Novotná	6	6
6	(Argentina) F Labat	4	4
4	(Austria) J Wiesner	7	6
(United States) G Helgeson	5	4

Semifinals
1	(Czech Republic) J Novotná	6^{9}	4
4	(Austria) J Wiesner	7^{11}	6

=== Bottom half ===
First round
7	(Japan) M Endo	6	2	6
Q	(Brazil) A Vieira	2	6	2
(United States) T Whitlinger	2	6	1
WC	(France) K Quentrec	6	3	6
(Italy) N Baudone	3	6	1
Q	(Italy) S Farina	6	4	6
(France) P Paradis-Mangon	6	6
Q	(Japan) A Kijimuta	2	2
(Czech Republic) A Strnadová	6	2	2
Q	(France) S Pitkowski	4	6	6
(Finland) N Dahlman	6	2	3
(France) S Testud	2	6	6

Second round
7	(Japan) M Endo	6	6
WC	(France) K Quentrec	1	4
Q	(Italy) S Farina	5	6	2
5	(Japan) N Sawamatsu	7	2	6
(France) P Paradis-Mangon	6	6
Q	(France) S Pitkowski	3	4
(France) S Testud	6	6
3	(United States) L McNeil	1	3

Quarterfinals
7	(Japan) M Endo	2	3
5	(Japan) N Sawamatsu	6	6
(France) P Paradis-Mangon	6	3	2
(France) S Testud	3	6	6

Semifinals
5	(Japan) N Sawamatsu	6	6
(France) S Testud	4	0
