= 1994 Internationaux de Strasbourg =

- Date: 16–22 May
- Edition: 8th
- Category: Tier III
- Draw: 32S / 16D
- Prize money: $150,000
- Surface: Clay / outdoor
- Location: Strasbourg, France
- Venue: Ligue d'Alsace de Tenis

Champions

Singles
- (United States) Mary Joe Fernández

Doubles
- (United States) Lori McNeil / (Australia) Rennae Stubbs
← 1993 ·	Internationaux de Strasbourg	· 1995 →

The 1994 Internationaux de Strasbourg was a women's tennis tournament played on outdoor clay courts in Strasbourg, France that was part of Tier III of the 1994 WTA Tour. It was the eighth edition of the tournament and was held from 16 May until 22 May 1994. Third-seeded Mary Joe Fernández won the singles title and earned $25,000 first-prize money.

== Finals ==
=== Singles ===
(United States) Mary Joe Fernández defeated (Argentina) Gabriela Sabatini 2–6, 6–4, 6–0

- It was Fernández's only singles title of the year and the 4th of her career.

=== Doubles ===
(United States) Lori McNeil / (Australia) Rennae Stubbs defeated (Argentina) Patricia Tarabini / (Netherlands) Caroline Vis 6–3, 3–6, 6–2
