= 1989 Internationaux de Strasbourg – Singles =

Singles
- 1989 Internationaux de Strasbourg
- 1988 Champion: (Italy) Sandra Cecchini

Final
- Champion: (Czechoslovakia) Jana Novotná
- Runner-up: (Argentina) Patricia Tarabini
- Score: 6–1, 6–2

Details
- Draw: 32
- Seeds: 8

Events
Singles	Doubles
← 1988 ·	Internationaux de Strasbourg	· 1990 →

Sandra Cecchini was the defending champion but did not compete that year.

Second-seeded Jana Novotná won in the final 6–1, 6–2 against Patricia Tarabini.

== Seeds ==
A champion seed is indicated in bold text while text in italics indicates the round in which that seed was eliminated.

1. (Bulgaria) Katerina Maleeva (first round)
2. (Czechoslovakia) **Jana Novotná (champion)**
3. (United States) Susan Sloane (quarterfinals)
4. (Argentina) Bettina Fulco (quarterfinals)
5. (Australia) Nicole Provis (second round)
6. (Austria) Judith Wiesner (second round)
7. (United States) Gretchen Magers (quarterfinals)
8. (United States) Ann Grossman (quarterfinals)

== Draw ==
=== Key ===
- Q = Qualifier
- WC = Wild card
- LL = Lucky loser
- Alt = Alternate
- SE = Special exempt
- PR = Protected ranking
- ITF = ITF entry
- JE = Junior exempt
- w/o = Walkover
- r = Retired
- d = Defaulted
- SR = Special ranking

First round
1	(Bulgaria) K Maleeva	1	3
(Argentina) **P Tarabini**	**6**	**6**
(Netherlands) B Schultz	2	4
(Netherlands) **M Bollegraf**	**6**	**6**
(South Africa) A Coetzer	3	0
(South Africa) **E Reinach**	**6**	**6**
(West Germany) S Meier	1	0
8	(United States) **A Grossman**	**6**	**6**
4	(Argentina) **B Fulco**	**6**	2	**6**
Q	(Czechoslovakia) D Krajčovičová	4	**6**	0
(Argentina) **M Paz**	**6**	**6**
(United States) K Gompert	1	2
(West Germany) **W Probst**	4	**6**	**6**
(France) A Dechaume	**6**	3	1
(France) N Herreman	6	3
5	(Australia) **N Provis**	**7**	**6**
6	(Austria) **J Wiesner**	**6**	**6**
Q	(South Africa) K Schimper	4	4
(Australia) **J-A Faull**	**6**	**6**
(Czechoslovakia) I Budařová	4	1
Q	(Sweden) C Dahlman	2	4
(Italy) **L Ferrando**	**6**	**6**
(Belgium) S Wasserman	6	0
3	(United States) **S Sloane**	**7**	**6**
7	(United States) **G Magers**	1	**6**	**6**
(Brazil) N Dias	**6**	3	4
(United States) E Hakami	2	**6**	4
(Czechoslovakia) **P Langrová**	**6**	2	**6**
(United States) M Torres	5	**6**	2
(United States) **S Martin**	**7**	1	**6**
Q	(Soviet Union) N Medvedeva	3	4
2	(Czechoslovakia) **J Novotná**	**6**	**6**

Second round
(Argentina) **P Tarabini**	**6**	**6**
(Netherlands) M Bollegraf	1	3
(South Africa) E Reinach	2	**6**	4
8	(United States) **A Grossman**	**6**	4	**6**
4	(Argentina) **B Fulco**	**6**	4	**6**
(Argentina) M Paz	1	**6**	0
(West Germany) **W Probst**	4	**7**	**6**
5	(Australia) N Provis	**6**	6	3
6	(Austria) J Wiesner	4	3
(Australia) **J-A Faull**	**6**	**6**
(Italy) L Ferrando	3	2
3	(United States) **S Sloane**	**6**	**6**
7	(United States) **G Magers**	**6**	**6**
(Czechoslovakia) P Langrová	4	0
(United States) S Martin	2	**6**	3
2	(Czechoslovakia) **J Novotná**	**6**	4	**6**

Quarterfinals
(Argentina) **P Tarabini**	**6**	**6**
8	(United States) A Grossman	4	1
4	(Argentina) B Fulco	4	**6**	6
(West Germany) **W Probst**	**6**	4	**7**
(Australia) **J-A Faull**	**6**	**6**
3	(United States) S Sloane	3	1
7	(United States) G Magers	2	4
2	(Czechoslovakia) **J Novotná**	**6**	**6**

Semifinals
(Argentina) **P Tarabini**	**6**	**6**
(West Germany) W Probst	3	3
(Australia) J-A Faull	1	2
2	(Czechoslovakia) **J Novotná**	**6**	**6**

Final
(Argentina) Patricia Tarabini	1	2
2	(Czechoslovakia) **Jana Novotná**	**6**	**6**
