= Julia Jehs =

German tennis player (born 1975)

- Country (sports): Germany
- Born: 29 March 1975 (age 49)
- Prize money: $34,049

Singles
- Career record: 50–64
- Highest ranking: No. 223 (26 Apr 1993)

Doubles
- Career record: 8–13
- Highest ranking: No. 439 (15 Feb 1993)

Julia Jehs (born 29 March 1975) is a German former professional tennis player.

Jehs, who had a career high ranking of 223 in the world, played on the professional tour in the 1990s, with two WTA Tour main draw appearances. At the 1992 Strasbourg Open she won her first round match over Jenny Byrne, then lost in the second round to eighth seed Debbie Graham. She was beaten in the first round of the 1994 Linz Open.

Following her professional career, Jehs was successful at collegiate level in the United States, competing for Lynn University from 1997 to 2000. She was a member of Lynn's 1997 and 1998 NCAA Division II Championship winning teams. Her three ITA All-American singles selections included an undefeated season in 1998 and she earned All-American honors a further four times for doubles. She is a member of the Sunshine State Conference Hall of Fame.

== ITF finals ==
=== Singles: 2 (0–2) ===
Outcome	No.	Date	Tournament	Surface	Opponent	Score
Runner-up	1.	26 January 1992	Bergen, Norway	Carpet	(Russia) Elena Makarova	0–6, 0–6
Runner-up	2.	9 July 1995	Stuttgart, Germany	Clay	(Czech Republic) Lenka Cenková	4–6, 1–6

=== Doubles: 1 (0–1) ===
Outcome	No.	Date	Tournament	Surface	Partner	Opponents	Score
Runner-up	1.	1 November 1992	Madeira, Portugal	Hard	(Belgium) Els Callens	(Denmark) Karin Ptaszek (Sweden) Marianne Vallin	1–6, 3–6
