= 1991 Internationaux de Strasbourg – Singles =

Singles
- 1991 Internationaux de Strasbourg

Final
- Champion: (Czechoslovakia) Radka Zrubáková
- Runner-up: (Australia) Rachel McQuillan
- Score: 7–6^{(7–3)}, 7–6^{(7–3)}

Details
- Draw: 28 (3Q/1LL)
- Seeds: 8

Events
Singles	Doubles
← 1990 ·	Internationaux de Strasbourg	· 1992 →

Mercedes Paz was the defending champion, but lost in the first round to Radka Zrubáková.

Zrubáková won the title by defeating Rachel McQuillan 7–6^{(7–3)}, 7–6^{(7–3)} in the final.

== Seeds ==
The first four seeds received a bye into the second round.

1. (Austria) Judith Wiesner (quarterfinals)
2. (United States) Lori McNeil (quarterfinals)
3. (Belgium) Sabine Appelmans (second round)
4. (Peru) Laura Gildemeister (quarterfinals)
5. (Italy) Federica Bonsignori (first round)
6. (Netherlands) Manon Bollegraf (first round)
7. (Argentina) Mercedes Paz (first round)
8. (United States) Susan Sloane (first round)

== Draw ==
=== Key ===
- Q = Qualifier
- WC = Wild card
- LL = Lucky loser
- Alt = Alternate
- ITF = ITF entry
- PR = Protected ranking
- SR = Special ranking
- SE = Special exempt
- JE = Junior exempt
- JR = Junior Accelerator Programme entrant
- CO = College Accelerator Programme entrant
- NG = Next Gen Accelerator Program entrant
- w/o = Walkover
- r = Retired
- d = Defaulted

=== Finals ===
Semifinals
(Australia) Rachel McQuillan	6	6
(Japan) Naoko Sawamatsu	4	3
(Czechoslovakia) Radka Zrubáková	6	6
(Australia) Anne Minter	1	3

Final
(Australia) Rachel McQuillan	6^{3}	6^{3}
(Czechoslovakia) Radka Zrubáková	7^{7}	7^{7}

=== Top half ===
First round
Q	(France) O Graveraux	2	3
(West Germany) V Martinek	6	6
(Australia) R McQuillan	6	7^{7}
(Italy) L Golarsa	0	6^{0}
(Czechoslovakia) P Langrová	3	6	6
5	(Italy) F Bonsignori	6	3	0
(Japan) N Sawamatsu	5	6	6
Q	(France) S Testud	7	4	2
(Germany) C Kohde-Kilsch	6	6
(France) V Batut	4	2
LL	(Japan) A Kijimuta	5	6	6
8	(United States) S Sloane	7	3	2

Second round
1	(Austria) J Wiesner	6	6
(West Germany) V Martinek	4	4
(Australia) R McQuillan	6	6
(Czechoslovakia) P Langrová	1	1
3	(Belgium) S Appelmans	4	3
(Japan) N Sawamatsu	6	6
(Germany) C Kohde-Kilsch	6	6^{5}	7^{7}
LL	(Japan) A Kijimuta	4	7^{7}	6^{5}

Quarterfinals
1	(Austria) J Wiesner	4	6^{3}
(Australia) R McQuillan	6	7^{7}
(Japan) N Sawamatsu	6	6
(Germany) C Kohde-Kilsch	3	1

Semifinals
(Australia) R McQuillan	6	6
(Japan) N Sawamatsu	4	3

=== Bottom half ===
First round
7	(Argentina) M Paz	3	2
(Czechoslovakia) R Zrubáková	6	6
(South Africa) M de Swardt	6	7
Q	(Hungary) A Földényi	1	5
(France) N Herreman	3	5
(Soviet Union) E Brioukhovets	6	7
6	(Netherlands) M Bollegraf	7^{7}	2	1
(France) K Quentrec	6^{5}	6	6
(Australia) A Minter	0	7^{9}	6
(West Germany) I Cueto	6	6^{7}	3
Q	(Belgium) S Wasserman	2	3
(United States) A Grossman	6	6

Second round
(Czechoslovakia) R Zrubáková	7^{12}	6
(South Africa) M de Swardt	6^{10}	1
(Soviet Union) E Brioukhovets	2	6^{3}
4	(Peru) L Gildemeister	6	7^{7}
(France) K Quentrec	2	2
(Australia) A Minter	6	6
(United States) A Grossman	2	3
2	(United States) L McNeil	6	6

Quarterfinals
(Czechoslovakia) R Zrubáková	6	6
4	(Peru) L Gildemeister	0	3
(Australia) A Minter	6	7^{7}
2	(United States) L McNeil	1	6^{5}

Semifinals
(Czechoslovakia) R Zrubáková	6	6
(Australia) A Minter	1	3
