= 1987 Grand Prix de Strasbourg =

- Date: 18–24 May
- Edition: 1st
- Category: 1+
- Draw: 32S / 16D
- Prize money: $75,000
- Surface: Clay / outdoor
- Location: Strasbourg, France

Champions

Singles
- (Canada) Carling Bassett

Doubles
- (Czechoslovakia) Jana Novotná / (France) Catherine Suire
Internationaux de Strasbourg	· 1988 →

The 1987 Grand Prix de Strasbourg was a women's tennis tournament played on outdoor clay courts in Strasbourg, France, and was part of the Category 1+ tier of the 1987 Virginia Slims World Championship Series. It was the inaugural edition of the tournament and was held from 18 May until 24 May 1987. Fourth-seeded Carling Bassett won the singles title.

== Finals ==
=== Singles ===
(Canada) Carling Bassett defeated (Italy) Sandra Cecchini 6–3, 6–4

- It was Bassett's only singles title of the year and the 2nd and last of her career.

=== Doubles ===
(Czechoslovakia) Jana Novotná / (France) Catherine Suire defeated (United States) Kathleen Horvath / (Netherlands) Marcella Mesker 6–0, 6–2
