= 1993 Internationaux de Strasbourg – Doubles =

Doubles
- 1993 Internationaux de Strasbourg

Final
- Champions: (United States) Shaun Stafford; (Hungary) Andrea Temesvári
- Runners-up: (Canada) Jill Hetherington; (United States) Kathy Rinaldi
- Score: 6–7^{(5–7)}, 6–3, 6–4

Details
- Draw: 16
- Seeds: 4

Events
Singles	Doubles
← 1992 ·	Internationaux de Strasbourg	· 1994 →

The 1993 Internationaux de Strasbourg doubles event was part of the 1993 Internationaux de Strasbourg women's tennis tournament which was part of Tier III of the 1993 WTA Tour and held from 17 May until 23 May 1993 in Strasbourg, France. The draw consisted of 16 teams of which four were seeded. Patty Fendick and Andrea Strnadová were the defending doubles champions, but neither competed this year. The unseeded team of Shaun Stafford and Andrea Temesvári won the title by defeating the top-seeded team of Jill Hetherington and Kathy Rinaldi 6–7^{(5–7)}, 6–3, 6–4 in the final.

== Seeds ==
1. (Canada) Jill Hetherington / (United States) Kathy Rinaldi (final)
2. (United States) Louise Allen / (Argentina) Florencia Labat (first round)
3. (Australia) Rachel McQuillan / (Australia) Kristine Radford (quarterfinals)
4. (United States) Ann Grossman / (Canada) Patricia Hy (semifinals)

== Draw ==
=== Key ===
- Q = Qualifier
- WC = Wild card
- LL = Lucky loser
- Alt = Alternate
- SE = Special exempt
- PR = Protected ranking
- ITF = ITF entry
- JE = Junior exempt
- w/o = Walkover
- r = Retired
- d = Defaulted
- SR = Special ranking

=== Draw ===
First round

Quarterfinals

Semifinals

Final

1
(Canada) J Hetherington
(United States) K Rinaldi
3
7^{7}
6

Q
- (South Africa) J Kruger
- (United States) J Santrock
6
6^{5}
3

1
(Canada) J Hetherington
(United States) K Rinaldi
4
6
6

- (Japan) K Nagatsuka
- (France) C Tanvier
3
4

- (France) P Paradis-Mangon
- (France) S Testud
6
1
4

(France) P Paradis-Mangon
(France) S Testud
6
6

1
(Canada) J Hetherington
(United States) K Rinaldi
6
4
7

4
(United States) A Grossman
(Canada) P Hy
7^{7}
4
6

4
- (United States) A Grossman
- (Canada) P Hy
2
6
5

- (United States) C Benjamin
- (Australia) JA Faull
6^{0}
6
1

4
(United States) A Grossman
(Canada) P Hy
4
6
6

- (Finland) N Dahlman
- (Czech Republic) K Kroupová
6^{5}
4

- (Australia) C Barclay
- (Australia) KA Guse
6
4
3

(Australia) C Barclay
(Australia) KA Guse
7^{7}
6

1
- (Canada) J Hetherington
- (United States) K Rinaldi
7^{7}
3
4

(United States) S Stafford
(Hungary) A Temesvári
4
7^{7}
6

(United States) S Stafford
(Hungary) A Temesvári
6^{5}
6
6

- (Italy) E Brusati
- (Netherlands) S van der Aa
6
6^{2}
3

(United States) S Stafford
(Hungary) A Temesvári
2
6
6

- (Germany) R Kochta
- (Germany) V Martinek
2
2

3
- (Australia) R McQuillan
- (Australia) K Radford
6
4
1

3
(Australia) R McQuillan
(Australia) K Radford
6
6

(United States) S Stafford
(Hungary) A Temesvári
6
4
6

- (Italy) N Baudone
- (Argentina) B Fulco-Villella
4
1

- (Australia) D Jones
- (Canada) R Simpson-Alter
2
6
4

(Australia) D Jones
(Canada) R Simpson-Alter
6
6

(Australia) D Jones
(Canada) R Simpson-Alter

(Japan) A Kijimuta
(Japan) N Sawamatsu
6
7^{7}

- (Japan) A Kijimuta
- (Japan) N Sawamatsu
d

2
- (United States) L Allen
- (Argentina) F Labat
3
6^{3}
