= 1991 Internationaux de Strasbourg – Doubles =

Doubles
- 1991 Internationaux de Strasbourg

Final
- Champions: (United States) Lori McNeil (United States) Stephanie Rehe
- Runners-up: (Netherlands) Manon Bollegraf (Argentina) Mercedes Paz
- Score: 6–7^{(2–7)}, 6–4, 6–4

Details
- Draw: 16 (1Q)
- Seeds: 4

Events
Singles	Doubles
← 1990 ·	Internationaux de Strasbourg	· 1992 →

Nicole Provis and Elna Reinach were the defending champions, but both players chose to compete at Geneva during the same week, with different partners.

Lori McNeil and Stephanie Rehe won the title by defeating Manon Bollegraf and Mercedes Paz 6–7^{(2–7)}, 6–4, 6–4 in the final.

== Seeds ==
1. (Netherlands) Manon Bollegraf / (Argentina) Mercedes Paz (final)
2. (Australia) Rachel McQuillan / (France) Catherine Tanvier (semifinals)
3. (Czechoslovakia) Petra Langrová / (Czechoslovakia) Radka Zrubáková (semifinals)
4. (United States) Lori McNeil / (United States) Stephanie Rehe (champions)

== Draw ==
=== Key ===
- Q = Qualifier
- WC = Wild card
- LL = Lucky loser
- Alt = Alternate
- SE = Special exempt
- PR = Protected ranking
- ITF = ITF entry
- JE = Junior exempt
- w/o = Walkover
- r = Retired
- d = Defaulted
- SR = Special ranking

=== Draw ===
First round
1	(Netherlands) M Bollegraf (Argentina) M Paz	6	6
(France) S Amiach (France) K Quentrec	4	4
Q	(Japan) A Kijimuta (Japan) N Sawamatsu	6	6
(United States) L Glitz (Australia) A Minter	4	0
3	(Czechoslovakia) P Langrová (Czechoslovakia) R Zrubáková	6	6
(Netherlands) I Driehuis (Australia) A Scott	3	2
(United States) H Cioffi (United States) S Sloane	3	2
(United States) L Harvey Wild (United States) A Keller	6	6
(Greece) J Apostoli (United States) D Faber	7	6
(United States) A Grossman (Argentina) F Labat	5	2
(Soviet Union) A Blumberga (Australia) KA Guse	4	4
4	(United States) L McNeil (United States) S Rehe	6	6
(Soviet Union) E Brioukhovets (Bulgaria) E Pampoulova	3	6	2
(Italy) L Golarsa (France) N Herreman	6	0	6
(Netherlands) G Coorengel (Netherlands) A van Buuren	2	3
2	(Australia) R McQuillan (France) C Tanvier	6	6

Quarterfinals
1	(Netherlands) M Bollegraf (Argentina) M Paz	6	6
Q	(Japan) A Kijimuta (Japan) N Sawamatsu	2	4
3	(Czechoslovakia) P Langrová (Czechoslovakia) R Zrubáková	6	6
(United States) L Harvey Wild (United States) A Keller	2	3
(Greece) J Apostoli (United States) D Faber	2	3
4	(United States) L McNeil (United States) S Rehe	6	6
(Italy) L Golarsa (France) N Herreman	6^{9}	6	2
2	(Australia) R McQuillan (France) C Tanvier	7^{11}	3	6

Semifinals
1	(Netherlands) M Bollegraf (Argentina) M Paz	6	6
3	(Czechoslovakia) P Langrová (Czechoslovakia) R Zrubáková	1	4
4	(United States) L McNeil (United States) S Rehe	7^{7}	6
2	(Australia) R McQuillan (France) C Tanvier	6^{5}	1

Final
1	(Netherlands) M Bollegraf (Argentina) M Paz	7^{7}	4	4
4	(United States) L McNeil (United States) S Rehe	6^{2}	6	6
