= 1993 Internationaux de Strasbourg =

- Date: 17–23 May
- Edition: 7th
- Category: Tier III
- Draw: 28S / 16D
- Prize money: $150,000
- Surface: Clay / outdoor
- Location: Strasbourg, France
- Venue: Ligue d'Alsace de Tenis

Champions

Singles
- (Japan) Naoko Sawamatsu

Doubles
- (United States) Shaun Stafford / (Hungary) Andrea Temesvári
← 1992 ·	Internationaux de Strasbourg	· 1994 →

The 1993 Internationaux de Strasbourg was a women's tennis tournament played on outdoor clay courts in Strasbourg, France that was part of Tier III of the 1993 WTA Tour. It was the seventh edition of the tournament and was held from 17 May until 23 May 1993. Fifth-seeded Naoko Sawamatsu won the singles title and earned $25,000 first-prize money.

== Finals ==
=== Singles ===
(Japan) Naoko Sawamatsu defeated (Austria) Judith Wiesner 4–6, 6–1, 6–3

- It was Sawamatsu's 1st title of the year and the 2nd of her career.

=== Doubles ===
(United States) Shaun Stafford / (Hungary) Andrea Temesvári defeated (Canada) Jill Hetherington / (United States) Kathy Rinaldi 6–7^{(5–7)}, 6–3, 6–4
