= 1995 Internationaux de Strasbourg – Doubles =

Doubles
- 1995 Internationaux de Strasbourg
- 1994 Champions: (United States) Lori McNeil (Australia) Rennae Stubbs

Final
- Champions: (United States) Lindsay Davenport (United States) Mary Joe Fernández
- Runners-up: (Belgium) Sabine Appelmans (Netherlands) Miriam Oremans
- Score: 6–2, 6–3

Details
- Draw: 16
- Seeds: 4

Events
Singles	Doubles
← 1994 ·	Internationaux de Strasbourg	· 1996 →

Lori McNeil and Rennae Stubbs were the defending champions but only McNeil competed that year with Mercedes Paz.

McNeil and Paz lost in the first round to Marianne Werdel-Witmeyer and Tami Whitlinger-Jones.

Lindsay Davenport and Mary Joe Fernández won in the final 6–2, 6–3 against Sabine Appelmans and Miriam Oremans.

== Seeds ==
Champion seeds are indicated in bold text while text in italics indicates the round in which those seeds were eliminated.

1. (United States) **Lindsay Davenport** / (United States) **Mary Joe Fernández (champions)**
2. (Australia) Nicole Bradtke / (South Africa) Elna Reinach (quarterfinals)
3. (United States) Lori McNeil / (Argentina) Mercedes Paz (first round)
4. (Australia) Catherine Barclay / (South Africa) Mariaan de Swardt (semifinals)

== Draw ==
=== Key ===
- Q = Qualifier
- WC = Wild card
- LL = Lucky loser
- Alt = Alternate
- SE = Special exempt
- PR = Protected ranking
- ITF = ITF entry
- JE = Junior exempt
- w/o = Walkover
- r = Retired
- d = Defaulted
- SR = Special ranking

First round
1	(United States) **L Davenport** (United States) **M J Fernández**	**6**	**6**
(Japan) M Endo (Czech Republic) E Martincová	0	2
(United States) A Keller (United States) J Steven	**6**	5	1
(Germany) **C Schneider** (France) **S Testud**	3	**7**	**6**
4	(Australia) **C Barclay** (South Africa) **M de Swardt**	**6**	**6**
(France) A Dechaume-Balleret (Argentina) F Labat	4	2
(Mexico) **A Gavaldón** (Netherlands) **S Rottier**	**7**	**6**
(Australia) D Jones (Japan) Y Kamio	5	4
(United States) **A Frazier** (United States) **K Po**	**6**	**6**
(South Africa) L Horn (United States) S Reece	3	3
(United States) **M Werdel-Witmeyer** (United States) **T Whitlinger-Jones**	**7**	**6**
3	(United States) L McNeil (Argentina) M Paz	6	3
(Belgium) **S Appelmans** (Netherlands) **M Oremans**	**6**	3	**6**
(Canada) M Bernard (Canada) C Delisle	3	**6**	3
Q	(South Africa) N de Villiers (Australia) S Peters	3	2
2	(Australia) **N Bradtke** (South Africa) **E Reinach**	**6**	**6**

Quarterfinals
1	(United States) **L Davenport** (United States) **M J Fernández**	**6**	**6**
(Germany) C Schneider (France) S Testud	0	3
4	(Australia) **C Barclay** (South Africa) **M de Swardt**	4	**6**	**6**
(Mexico) A Gavaldón (Netherlands) S Rottier	**6**	1	0
(United States) **A Frazier** (United States) **K Po**	**6**	**6**
(United States) M Werdel-Witmeyer (United States) T Whitlinger-Jones	3	2
(Belgium) **S Appelmans** (Netherlands) **M Oremans**	**6**	**6**
2	(Australia) N Bradtke (South Africa) E Reinach	3	3

Semifinals
1	(United States) **L Davenport** (United States) **M J Fernández**	**6**	**6**
4	(Australia) C Barclay (South Africa) M de Swardt	3	3
(United States) A Frazier (United States) K Po	2	**6**	5
(Belgium) **S Appelmans** (Netherlands) **M Oremans**	**6**	2	**7**

Final
1	(United States) **Lindsay Davenport** (United States) **Mary Joe Fernández**	**6**	**6**
(Belgium) Sabine Appelmans (Netherlands) Miriam Oremans	2	3
