= 1990 Internationaux de Strasbourg =

- Date: 21–27 May
- Edition: 4th
- Category: Tier IV
- Draw: 28S / 16D
- Prize money: $150,000
- Surface: Clay / outdoor
- Location: Strasbourg, France
- Venue: Ligue d'Alsace de Tenis

Champions

Singles
- (Argentina) Mercedes Paz

Doubles
- (Australia) Nicole Provis / (South Africa) Elna Reinach
← 1989 ·	Internationaux de Strasbourg	· 1991 →

The 1990 Internationaux de Strasbourg was a women's tennis tournament played on outdoor clay courts at the Ligue d'Alsace de Tenis in Strasbourg, France that was part of the Tier IV category of the 1990 WTA Tour. It was the fourth edition of the tournament and was held from 21 May until 27 May 1990. Unseeded Mercedes Paz won the singles title.

== Finals ==
=== Singles ===
(Argentina) Mercedes Paz defeated (United States) Ann Grossman 6–2, 6–3

- It was Paz' 1st title of the year and the 3rd of her career.

=== Doubles ===
(Australia) Nicole Provis / (South Africa) Elna Reinach defeated (United States) Kathy Jordan / (Australia) Elizabeth Smylie 6–1, 6–4
