= 1988 Internationaux de Strasbourg =

- Date: 16–22 May
- Edition: 2nd
- Category: Category 2
- Draw: 32S /16D
- Prize money: $100,000
- Surface: Clay / outdoor
- Location: Strasbourg, France

Champions

Singles
- (Italy) Sandra Cecchini

Doubles
- (Netherlands) Manon Bollegraf / (Australia) Nicole Provis
← 1987 ·	Internationaux de Strasbourg	· 1989 →

The 1988 Internationaux de Strasbourg was a women's tennis tournament played on outdoor clay courts in Strasbourg, France, and was part of the Category 2 tier of the 1988 WTA Tour. It was the second edition of the tournament and ran from 16 May until 22 May 1988. Second-seeded Sandra Cecchini won the singles title.

== Finals ==
=== Singles ===
(Italy) Sandra Cecchini defeated (Austria) Judith Wiesner 6–3, 6–0

- It was Cecchini's 1st title of the year and the 8th of her career.

=== Doubles ===
(Netherlands) Manon Bollegraf / (Australia) Nicole Provis defeated (Australia) Jenny Byrne / (Australia) Janine Tremelling 7–5, 6–7^{(11–13)}, 6–3

- It was Bollegraf's only title of the year and the 1st of her career. It was Provis' only title of the year and the 1st of her career.
