= 1992 Internationaux de Strasbourg – Doubles =

Doubles
- 1992 Internationaux de Strasbourg

Final
- Champions: (United States) Patty Fendick (Czechoslovakia) Andrea Strnadová
- Runners-up: (United States) Lori McNeil (Argentina) Mercedes Paz
- Score: 6–3, 6–4

Events
Singles	Doubles
← 1991 ·	Internationaux de Strasbourg	· 1993 →

Lori McNeil and Stephanie Rehe were the defending champions, but Rehe did not compete this year.

McNeil teamed up with Mercedes Paz and lost in the final to Patty Fendick and Andrea Strnadová. The score was 6–3, 6–4.

== Seeds ==
1. (United States) Lori McNeil / (Argentina) Mercedes Paz (final)
2. (United States) Patty Fendick / (Czechoslovakia) Andrea Strnadová (champions)
3. (Japan) Kimiko Date / (Argentina) Florencia Labat (semifinals)
4. (Italy) Sandra Cecchini / (Argentina) Bettina Fulco Villella (first round)

== Draw ==
=== Key ===
- Q = Qualifier
- WC = Wild card
- LL = Lucky loser
- Alt = Alternate
- SE = Special exempt
- PR = Protected ranking
- ITF = ITF entry
- JE = Junior exempt
- w/o = Walkover
- r = Retired
- d = Defaulted
- SR = Special ranking

=== Draw ===
First round
1	(United States) L McNeil (Argentina) M Paz	6	6
WC	(France) S Amiach (France) A Fusai	3	4
(Switzerland) C Caverzasio (France) N Herreman	3	4
(Australia) J Byrne (United States) L Glitz	6	6
3	(Japan) K Date (Argentina) F Labat	1	6	6
(United States) D Faber (Germany) C Schneider	6	1	1
Q	(Mexico) A Gavaldón (United States) S Martin	5	2
(Australia) KA Guse (Australia) J Hodder	7	6
(Greece) J Apostoli (United States) A Keller	2	3
(United States) L Allen (South Africa) M de Swardt	6	6
(Japan) A Kijimuta (Japan) N Sawamatsu	6	7^{10}
4	(Italy) S Cecchini (Argentina) B Fulco Villella	3	6^{8}
(France) P Paradis-Mangon (France) S Testud	2	6^{4}
(United States) D Graham (United States) A Grossman	6	7^{7}
(United States) B Bowes (United States) J Emmons	0	3
2	(United States) P Fendick (Czechoslovakia) A Strnadová	6	6

Quarterfinals
1	(United States) L McNeil (Argentina) M Paz	6	6
(Australia) J Byrne (United States) L Glitz	3	2
3	(Japan) K Date (Argentina) F Labat	6	6
(Australia) KA Guse (Australia) J Hodder	0	2
(United States) L Allen (South Africa) M de Swardt	7	6
(Japan) A Kijimuta (Japan) N Sawamatsu	5	2
(United States) D Graham (United States) A Grossman	3	4
2	(United States) P Fendick (Czechoslovakia) A Strnadová	6	6

Semifinals
1	(United States) L McNeil (Argentina) M Paz	7^{7}	6
3	(Japan) K Date (Argentina) F Labat	6^{4}	2
(United States) L Allen (South Africa) M de Swardt	1	5
2	(United States) P Fendick (Czechoslovakia) A Strnadová	6	7

Final
1	(United States) L McNeil (Argentina) M Paz	3	4
2	(United States) P Fendick (Czechoslovakia) A Strnadová	6	6
