= Anne-Sophie Bittighoffer =

French tennis player

- Country (sports): France
- Born: 24 November 1977 (age 47)
- Prize money: $6,697

Singles
- Career record: 24–21
- Career titles: 1 ITF
- Highest ranking: No. 339 (24 Apr 1995)

Doubles
- Career record: 3–7
- Highest ranking: No. 675 (31 Oct 1994)

Anne-Sophie Bittighoffer (born 24 November 1977) is a French former professional tennis player.

Bittighoffer, who had a career best ranking of 339 in the world, featured as a wildcard in the main draw of the 1995 Internationaux de Strasbourg. She was beaten in the first round by fifth seed Lori McNeil.

== ITF finals ==
=== Singles: 2 (1–1) ===
Result	No.	Date	Tournament	Surface	Opponent	Score
Loss	1.	23 October 1994	Langenthal, Switzerland	Clay	(Czech Republic) Alena Vašková	3–6, 6–7
Win	2.	13 November 1994	Buenos Aires, Argentina	Clay	(United States) Christine Neuman	3–6, 6–3, 6–2
