= 1995 Internationaux de Strasbourg =

- Date: 22–28 May
- Edition: 9th
- Category: Tier III
- Draw: 32S / 16D
- Prize money: $161,250
- Surface: Clay / outdoor
- Location: Strasbourg, France

Champions

Singles
- (United States) Lindsay Davenport

Doubles
- (United States) Lindsay Davenport (United States) Mary Joe Fernández
← 1994 ·	Internationaux de Strasbourg	· 1996 →

The 1995 Internationaux de Strasbourg was a women's tennis tournament played on outdoor clay courts in Strasbourg, France that was part of Tier III of the 1995 WTA Tour. It was the ninth edition of the tournament and was held from 22 May until 28 May 1995. First-seeded Lindsay Davenport won the singles title and earned $25,000 first-prize money.

== Finals ==
=== Singles ===
(United States) Lindsay Davenport defeated (Japan) Kimiko Date 3–6, 6–1, 6–2

- It was Davenport's only singles title of the year and the 4th of her career.

=== Doubles ===
(United States) Lindsay Davenport / (United States) Mary Joe Fernández defeated (Belgium) Sabine Appelmans / (Netherlands) Miriam Oremans 6–2, 6–3

- It was Davenport's 4th title of the year and the 9th of her career. It was Fernández's 3rd title of the year and the 16th of her career.
