= 1988 Internationaux de Strasbourg – Doubles =

Doubles
- 1988 Internationaux de Strasbourg
- 1987 Champions: (Czechoslovakia) Jana Novotná (France) Catherine Suire

Final
- Champions: (Netherlands) Manon Bollegraf (Australia) Nicole Provis
- Runners-up: (Australia) Jenny Byrne (Australia) Janine Tremelling
- Score: 7–5, 6–7^{(11–13)}, 6–3

Details
- Draw: 16
- Seeds: 4

Events
Singles	Doubles
← 1987 ·	Internationaux de Strasbourg	· 1989 →

Jana Novotná and Catherine Suire were the defending champions but only Suire competed that year with Catherine Tanvier.

Suire and Tanvier lost in the first round to Anne Minter and Elna Reinach.

Manon Bollegraf and Nicole Provis won in the final 7–5, 6–7^{(11–13)}, 6–3 against Jenny Byrne and Janine Tremelling.

== Seeds ==
Champion seeds are indicated in bold text while text in italics indicates the round in which those seeds were eliminated.

1. (France) Catherine Suire / (France) Catherine Tanvier (first round)
2. (Soviet Union) Leila Meskhi / (Soviet Union) Natasha Zvereva (quarterfinals)
3. (Australia) Jenny Byrne / (Australia) Janine Tremelling (final)
4. (Netherlands) **Manon Bollegraf** / (Australia) **Nicole Provis (champions)**

== Draw ==
=== Key ===
- Q = Qualifier
- WC = Wild card
- LL = Lucky loser
- Alt = Alternate
- SE = Special exempt
- PR = Protected ranking
- ITF = ITF entry
- JE = Junior exempt
- w/o = Walkover
- r = Retired
- d = Defaulted
- SR = Special ranking

First round
1	(France) C Suire (France) C Tanvier	**6**	1	5
(Australia) **A Minter** (South Africa) **E Reinach**	4	**6**	**7**
(France) M-C Calleja (France) N Guerrée	3	2
(United States) **B Bowes** (United States) **K Horvath**	**6**	**6**
3	(Australia) **J Byrne** (Australia) **J Tremelling**	**7**	**6**
(Czechoslovakia) A Holíková (United States) M Torres	6	2
(Canada) M Drake (United Kingdom) C Wood	1	**7**	4
(Argentina) **B Fulco** (Austria) **J Wiesner**	**6**	5	**6**
(Netherlands) **I Driehuis** (Netherlands) **M Mesker**	**6**	**6**
(West Germany) I Cueto (United States) E Hakami	2	2
(Czechoslovakia) H Fukárková (Czechoslovakia) D Krajčovičová	4	1
4	(Netherlands) **M Bollegraf** (Australia) **N Provis**	**6**	**6**
(United States) A Frazier (United States) S Sloane	4	1
(France) **A Dechaume** (France) **P Paradis**	**6**	**6**
(Italy) S Cecchini (United States) S Rehe	2	6
2	(Soviet Union) **L Meskhi** (Soviet Union) **N Zvereva**	**6**	**7**

Quarterfinals
(Australia) **A Minter** (South Africa) **E Reinach**	**7**	**6**
(United States) B Bowes (United States) K Horvath	6	0
3	(Australia) **J Byrne** (Australia) **J Tremelling**	**6**	**6**
(Argentina) B Fulco (Austria) J Wiesner	4	3
(Netherlands) I Driehuis (Netherlands) M Mesker	**6**	6	6
4	(Netherlands) **M Bollegraf** (Australia) **N Provis**	2	**7**	**7**
(France) **A Dechaume** (France) **P Paradis**	**w/o**
2	(Soviet Union) L Meskhi (Soviet Union) N Zvereva

Semifinals
(Australia) A Minter (South Africa) E Reinach	4	3
3	(Australia) **J Byrne** (Australia) **J Tremelling**	**6**	**6**
4	(Netherlands) **M Bollegraf** (Australia) **N Provis**	1	**6**	**6**
(France) A Dechaume (France) P Paradis	**6**	1	2

Final
3	(Australia) Jenny Byrne (Australia) Janine Tremelling	5	**7^{13}**	3
4	(Netherlands) **Manon Bollegraf** (Australia) **Nicole Provis**	**7**	6^{11}	**6**
