= 1992 Internationaux de Strasbourg =

- Date: 18–24 May
- Edition: 6th
- Category: Tier IV
- Draw: 28S / 16D
- Prize money: $150,000
- Surface: Clay / outdoor
- Location: Strasbourg, France
- Venue: Ligue d'Alsace de Tenis

Champions

Singles
- (Austria) Judith Wiesner

Doubles
- (United States) Patty Fendick / (Czechoslovakia) Andrea Strnadová
← 1991 ·	Internationaux de Strasbourg	· 1993 →

The 1992 Internationaux de Strasbourg was a women's tennis tournament played on outdoor clay courts at the Ligue d'Alsace de Tenis in Strasbourg, France that was part of Tier IV of the 1992 WTA Tour. It was the sixth edition of the tournament and was held from 18 May until 24 May 1992. Second-seeded Judith Wiesner won the singles title and earned $27,000 first-prize money.

== Finals ==
=== Singles ===
(Austria) Judith Wiesner defeated (Japan) Naoko Sawamatsu 6–1, 6–3

- It was Wiesner's 1st title of the year and the 3rd of her career.

=== Doubles ===
(United States) Patty Fendick / (Czechoslovakia) Andrea Strnadová defeated (United States) Lori McNeil / (Argentina) Mercedes Paz 6–3, 6–4
