= 1988 Internationaux de Strasbourg – Singles =

Singles
- 1988 Internationaux de Strasbourg
- 1987 Champion: (Canada) Carling Bassett

Final
- Champion: (Italy) Sandra Cecchini
- Runner-up: (Austria) Judith Wiesner
- Score: 6–3, 6–0

Details
- Draw: 32
- Seeds: 8

Events
Singles	Doubles
← 1987 ·	Internationaux de Strasbourg	· 1989 →

Carling Bassett was the defending champion but did not compete that year.

Sandra Cecchini won in the final 6–3, 6–0 against Judith Wiesner.

== Seeds ==
A champion seed is indicated in bold text while text in italics indicates the round in which that seed was eliminated.

1. (Soviet Union) Natasha Zvereva (semifinals)
2. (Italy) **Sandra Cecchini (champion)**
3. (United States) Stephanie Rehe (second round)
4. (Canada) Helen Kelesi (second round)
5. (Australia) Anne Minter (quarterfinals)
6. (Soviet Union) Leila Meskhi (second round)
7. (West Germany) Isabel Cueto (second round)
8. (United States) Elly Hakami (first round)

== Draw ==
=== Key ===
- Q = Qualifier
- WC = Wild card
- LL = Lucky loser
- Alt = Alternate
- ITF = ITF entry
- PR = Protected ranking
- SR = Special ranking
- SE = Special exempt
- JE = Junior exempt
- JR = Junior Accelerator Programme entrant
- CO = College Accelerator Programme entrant
- NG = Next Gen Accelerator Program entrant
- w/o = Walkover
- r = Retired
- d = Defaulted

First round
1	(Soviet Union) **N Zvereva**	**6**	**7**
Q	(Czechoslovakia) O Votavová	2	5
(West Germany) **S Meier**	4	**6**	**7**
(France) P Paradis	**6**	4	6
(United States) **K Horvath**	**7**	**6**
(West Germany) C Singer	5	3
(France) **A Dechaume**	**6**	**6**
8	(United States) E Hakami	1	2
3	(United States) **S Rehe**	**6**	**6**
(United States) B Bowes	4	2
(Austria) **J Wiesner**	**6**	4	**6**
(United States) M Torres	2	**6**	2
(Argentina) **B Fulco**	**6**	**6**
(United States) L Bonder	3	4
Q	(United States) P Barg	0	2
6	(Soviet Union) **L Meskhi**	**6**	**6**
7	(West Germany) **I Cueto**	**6**	**6**
(South Africa) E Reinach	1	4
(Australia) **N Provis**	**6**	**6**
LL	(Australia) J Byrne	3	4
Q	(Czechoslovakia) L Lásková	2	3
(United States) **S Sloane**	**6**	**6**
(France) C Tanvier	3	5
4	(Canada) **H Kelesi**	**6**	**7**
5	(Australia) **A Minter**	4	**6**	**4**
(United States) K Rinaldi	**6**	4	0/r
(United States) M Gurney	3	1
Q	(Czechoslovakia) **D Krajčovičová**	**6**	**6**
(Czechoslovakia) A Holíková	4	**7**	2
(France) **C Suire**	**6**	5	**6**
(Netherlands) M Bollegraf	3	3
2	(Italy) **S Cecchini**	**6**	**6**

Second round
1	(Soviet Union) **N Zvereva**	**6**	**6**
(West Germany) S Meier	4	2
(United States) **K Horvath**	**6**	**6**
(France) A Dechaume	4	0
3	(United States) S Rehe	2	6
(Austria) **J Wiesner**	**6**	**7**
(Argentina) **B Fulco**	**7**	**1**
6	(Soviet Union) L Meskhi	5	0	r
7	(West Germany) I Cueto	5	5
(Australia) **N Provis**	**7**	**7**
(United States) **S Sloane**	4	**7**	**6**
4	(Canada) H Kelesi	**6**	5	3
5	(Australia) **A Minter**	6	**6**	**6**
Q	(Czechoslovakia) D Krajčovičová	**7**	3	3
(France) C Suire	3	6
2	(Italy) **S Cecchini**	**6**	**7**

Quarterfinals
1	(Soviet Union) **N Zvereva**	**6**	5	**7**
(United States) K Horvath	1	**7**	6
(Austria) **J Wiesner**	4	**6**	**6**
(Argentina) B Fulco	**6**	0	4
(Australia) **N Provis**	**7**	**6**
(United States) S Sloane	5	1
5	(Australia) A Minter	1	2
2	(Italy) **S Cecchini**	**6**	**6**

Semifinals
1	(Soviet Union) N Zvereva	3	**6**	6
(Austria) **J Wiesner**	**6**	4	**7**
(Australia) N Provis	1	2
2	(Italy) **S Cecchini**	**6**	**6**

Final
(Austria) Judith Wiesner	3	0
2	(Italy) **Sandra Cecchini**	**6**	**6**
