= 2016 Memphis Open – Singles =

Singles
- 2016 Memphis Open

Final
- Champion: (Japan) Kei Nishikori
- Runner-up: (United States) Taylor Fritz
- Score: 6–4, 6–4

Details
- Draw: 28
- Seeds: 8

Events
Singles	Doubles
← 2015 ·	Memphis Open	· 2017 →

Three-time defending champion Kei Nishikori successfully defended his title, defeating Taylor Fritz in the final, 6–4, 6–4 to win the singles title at the 2016 Memphis Open. Notably, this was only Fritz' third career event on the ATP Tour.

== Seeds ==
The top four seeds receive a bye into the second round.

1. (Japan) Kei Nishikori (champion)
2. (United States) Steve Johnson (second round)
3. (United States) Donald Young (quarterfinals)
4. (United States) Sam Querrey (semifinals)
5. (United States) Denis Kudla (second round)
6. (Australia) Sam Groth (first round)
7. (Australia) John Millman (second round)
8. (Bosnia and Herzegovina) Damir Džumhur (second round)

== Draw ==
=== Key ===
- Q = Qualifier
- WC = Wild card
- LL = Lucky loser
- Alt = Alternate
- SE = Special exempt
- PR = Protected ranking
- ITF = ITF entry
- JE = Junior exempt
- w/o = Walkover
- r = Retired
- d = Defaulted
- SR = Special ranking

=== Finals ===
Semifinals
1	(Japan) Kei Nishikori	3	6	6
4	(United States) Sam Querrey	6	3	3
(Lithuania) Ričardas Berankis	6	3	4
WC	(United States) Taylor Fritz	2	6	6

Final
1	(Japan) Kei Nishikori	6	6
WC	(United States) Taylor Fritz	4	4

=== Top half ===
First round
(United States) R Harrison	6^{0}	7^{10}	6
WC	(United States) F Tiafoe	7^{7}	6^{8}	4
(Italy) L Vanni	4	6^{4}
(Kazakhstan) M Kukushkin	6	7^{7}
(United States) R Ram	4	2
5	(United States) D Kudla	6	6
Q	(Switzerland) H Laaksonen	6	3
(Australia) M Ebden	1	0^{r}
Q	(Japan) Y Nishioka	6	6
Q	(United States) J Donaldson	3	4
(Ukraine) I Marchenko	7^{7}	7^{7}
6	(Australia) S Groth	6^{4}	6^{2}

Second round
1	(Japan) K Nishikori	6	7
(United States) R Harrison	2	5
(Kazakhstan) M Kukushkin	6	7
5	(United States) D Kudla	1	5
4	(United States) S Querrey	6	6
Q	(Switzerland) H Laaksonen	3	4
Q	(Japan) Y Nishioka	6	6
(Ukraine) I Marchenko	1	3

Quarterfinals
1	(Japan) K Nishikori	6	6
(Kazakhstan) M Kukushkin	2	4
4	(United States) S Querrey	6	6
Q	(Japan) Y Nishioka	3	4

Semifinals
1	(Japan) K Nishikori	3	6	6
4	(United States) S Querrey	6	3	3

=== Bottom half ===
First round
8	(Bosnia and Herzegovina) D Džumhur	6	4	6
(United States) T Smyczek	3	6	3
(Israel) D Sela	7^{7}	2	5
(Lithuania) R Berankis	6^{5}	6	7
(Tunisia) M Jaziri	1	3
(Spain) M Granollers	6	6
7	(Australia) J Millman	6	6^{3}	7
(United States) A Krajicek	3	7^{7}	5
(Germany) B Becker	6	3	6
WC	(United States) T Paul	4	6	3
WC	(United States) T Fritz	6	6
Q	(United States) M Mmoh	3	4

Second round
8	(Bosnia and Herzegovina) D Džumhur	3	4
(Lithuania) R Berankis	6	6
(Spain) M Granollers	1	6^{2}
3	(United States) D Young	6	7^{7}
7	(Australia) J Millman	2	6^{6}
(Germany) B Becker	6	7^{8}
WC	(United States) T Fritz	7^{7}	7^{9}
2	(United States) S Johnson	6^{5}	6^{7}

Quarterfinals
(Lithuania) R Berankis	7^{7}	6
3	(United States) D Young	6^{3}	1
(Germany) B Becker	4	7	6^{5}
WC	(United States) T Fritz	6	5	7^{7}

Semifinals
(Lithuania) R Berankis	6	3	4
WC	(United States) T Fritz	2	6	6

== Qualifying ==
=== Seeds ===
1. (Moldova) Radu Albot (qualifying competition)
2. (United States) Bjorn Fratangelo (qualifying competition)
3. (Japan) Yoshihito Nishioka (qualified)
4. (Japan) Tatsuma Ito (first round)
5. (Australia) John-Patrick Smith (first round)
6. (United States) Dennis Novikov (first round)
7. (United States) Jared Donaldson (qualified)
8. (Spain) Adrián Menéndez-Maceiras (qualifying competition)

=== Qualifiers ===
1. (Switzerland) Henri Laaksonen
2. (United States) Michael Mmoh
3. (Japan) Yoshihito Nishioka
4. (United States) Jared Donaldson

=== Qualifying draw ===
==== First qualifier ====
First round
1	(Moldova) Radu Albot	6	6
(Russia) Andrey Rublev	3	4
(Switzerland) Henri Laaksonen	5	7^{8}	6
5	(Australia) John-Patrick Smith	7	6^{6}	4

Qualifying competition
1	(Moldova) Radu Albot	7^{8}	6^{4}	1
(Switzerland) Henri Laaksonen	6^{6}	7^{7}	6

==== Second qualifier ====
First round
2	(United States) Bjorn Fratangelo	6	6
WC	(United States) Jarryd Woog	2	2
WC	(United States) Michael Mmoh	6	4	6
6	(United States) Dennis Novikov	1	6	4

Qualifying competition
2	(United States) Bjorn Fratangelo	4	7	6^{6}
WC	(United States) Michael Mmoh	6	5	7^{8}

==== Third qualifier ====
First round
3	(Japan) Yoshihito Nishioka	6	6
Alt	(United Kingdom) Joe Salisbury	2	3
(India) Somdev Devvarman	3	4
8	(Spain) Adrián Menéndez-Maceiras	6	6

Qualifying competition
3	(Japan) Yoshihito Nishioka	6	4	6
8	(Spain) Adrián Menéndez-Maceiras	2	6	3

==== Fourth qualifier ====
First round
4	(Japan) Tatsuma Ito	2	1
(Republic of Ireland) James McGee	6	6
(United States) Tennys Sandgren	7	3	4
7	(United States) Jared Donaldson	5	6	6

Qualifying competition
(Republic of Ireland) James McGee	0	6^{0}
7	(United States) Jared Donaldson	6	7^{7}
