= 2015 Memphis Open =

- Date: February 9–15
- Edition: 41st
- Category: World Tour 250
- Draw: 28S / 16D
- Prize money: $585,870
- Surface: Hard / indoor
- Location: Memphis, United States
- Venue: Racquet Club of Memphis

Champions

Singles
- (Japan) Kei Nishikori

Doubles
- (Poland) Mariusz Fyrstenberg / (Mexico) Santiago González
← 2014 ·	Memphis Open	· 2016 →

The 2015 Memphis Open was a tennis tournament, played on indoor hard courts. It was the 41st edition of the event known that year as the Memphis Open, and part of the ATP World Tour 250 series of the 2015 ATP World Tour. It took place at the Racquet Club of Memphis in Memphis, United States, from 9 through 15 February 2015. First-seeded Kei Nishikori won his third consecutive singles title at the event.

== Finals ==
=== Singles ===
- (Japan) Kei Nishikori defeated (South Africa) Kevin Anderson, 6–4, 6–4

=== Doubles ===
- (Poland) Mariusz Fyrstenberg / (Mexico) Santiago González defeated (New Zealand) Artem Sitak / (United States) Donald Young, 5–7, 7–6^{(7–1)}, [10–8]

== Points and prize money ==
=== Point distribution ===
Event	W	F	SF	QF	Round of 16	Round of 32	Q	Q2	Q1
Singles	250	150	90	45	20	0	12	6	0
Doubles	250	150	90	45	0	—	—	—	—

=== Prize money ===
Event	W	F	SF	QF	Round of 16	Round of 32	Q3	Q2	Q1
Singles	$106,565	$56,125	$30,400	$17,320	$10,205	$6,050	$975	$465	$0
Doubles	$32,370	$17,020	$9,220	$5,280	$3,090	—	—	—	—
Doubles prize money per team

== Singles main-draw entrants ==
=== Seeds ===
Country	Player	Rank^{1}	Seed
JPN	Kei Nishikori	5	1
RSA	Kevin Anderson	15	2
USA	John Isner	18	3
UKR	Alexandr Dolgopolov	24	4
CRO	Ivo Karlović	25	5
USA	Steve Johnson	37	6
GER	Benjamin Becker	39	7
FRA	Adrian Mannarino	41	8

- ^{1} Rankings as of February 2, 2015

=== Other entrants ===
The following players received wildcards into the main draw:

- (South Africa) Kevin Anderson
- (United States) Jared Donaldson
- (United States) Stefan Kozlov

The following players received entry from the qualifying draw:

- (United States) Ryan Harrison
- (Australia) Thanasi Kokkinakis
- (United States) Austin Krajicek
- (United States) Denis Kudla

The following player received entry as a lucky loser:

- (Serbia) Filip Krajinović

=== Withdrawals ===
Before the tournament

- (Germany) Peter Gojowczyk → replaced by (Germany) Dustin Brown
- (Israel) Dudi Sela → replaced by (Serbia) Filip Krajinović
- (United States) Jack Sock → replaced by (Slovenia) Lukáš Lacko

== Doubles main-draw entrants ==
=== Seeds ===
Country	Player	Country	Player	Rank^{1}	Seed
CRO	Ivan Dodig	BLR	Max Mirnyi	57	1
AUS	Sam Groth	AUS	Chris Guccione	62	2
USA	Eric Butorac	USA	Rajeev Ram	86	3
POL	Mariusz Fyrstenberg	MEX	Santiago González	91	4

- ^{1} Rankings are as of February 2, 2015.

=== Other entrants ===
The following pairs received wildcards into the main draw:

- (United States) Stefan Kozlov / (United States) Denis Kudla
- (United States) Michael Mmoh / (United States) Francis Tiafoe

=== Withdrawals ===
During the tournament

- (Russia) Teymuraz Gabashvili (shoulder injury)
