= 2016 Memphis Open =

- Date: February 8–14
- Edition: 41st
- Category: World Tour 250
- Draw: 28S / 16D
- Prize money: $618,030
- Surface: Hard / indoor
- Location: Memphis, Tennessee, United States
- Venue: Racquet Club of Memphis

Champions

Singles
- (Japan) Kei Nishikori

Doubles
- (Poland) Mariusz Fyrstenberg / (Mexico) Santiago González
← 2015 ·	Memphis Open	· 2017 →

The 2016 Memphis Open was a tennis tournament, played on indoor hard courts. It was the 41st edition of the event known that year as the Memphis Open, and part of the ATP World Tour 250 series of the 2016 ATP World Tour. It took place at the Racquet Club of Memphis in Memphis, Tennessee, United States, from 8 through 14 February 2016. First-seeded Kei Nishikori won his fourth consecutive singles title at the event.

== Finals ==
=== Singles ===
- (Japan) Kei Nishikori defeated (United States) Taylor Fritz 6–4, 6–4

=== Doubles ===
- (Poland) Mariusz Fyrstenberg / (Mexico) Santiago González defeated (United States) Steve Johnson / (United States) Sam Querrey 6–4, 6–4

== Points and prize money ==
=== Point distribution ===
Event	W	F	SF	QF	Round of 16	Round of 32	Q	Q2	Q1
Singles	250	150	90	45	20	0	12	6	0
Doubles	250	150	90	45	0	—	—	—	—

=== Prize money ===
Event	W	F	SF	QF	Round of 16	Round of 32	Q2	Q1
Singles	$109,950	$57,910	$31,370	$17,875	$10,530	$6,240	$2,810	$1,405
Doubles	$33,400	$17,550	$9,520	$5,440	$3,190	—	—	—
Doubles prize money per team

== Singles main-draw entrants ==
=== Seeds ===
Country	Player	Rank^{1}	Seed
JPN	Kei Nishikori	7	1
USA	Steve Johnson	30	2
USA	Donald Young	48	3
USA	Sam Querrey	60	4
USA	Denis Kudla	62	5
AUS	Sam Groth	77	6
AUS	John Millman	78	7
BIH	Damir Džumhur	79	8

- ^{1} Rankings as of February 1, 2016

=== Other entrants ===
The following players received wildcards into the main draw:

- (United States) Taylor Fritz
- (United States) Tommy Paul
- (United States) Frances Tiafoe

The following players received entry from the qualifying draw:

- (United States) Jared Donaldson
- (Switzerland) Henri Laaksonen
- (United States) Michael Mmoh
- (Japan) Yoshihito Nishioka

=== Withdrawals ===
Before the tournament

- (South Africa) Kevin Anderson →replaced by (United States) Austin Krajicek
- (Germany) Tommy Haas →replaced by (Australia) Matthew Ebden
- (Chinese Taipei) Lu Yen-hsun →replaced by (Italy) Luca Vanni

=== Retirements ===
- (Australia) Matthew Ebden (left leg injury)

== Doubles main-draw entrants ==
=== Seeds ===
Country	Player	Country	Player	Rank^{1}	Seed
USA	Bob Bryan	USA	Mike Bryan	11	1
PHI	Treat Huey	BLR	Max Mirnyi	65	2
USA	Eric Butorac	USA	Scott Lipsky	84	3
USA	Steve Johnson	USA	Sam Querrey	90	4

- ^{1} Rankings are as of February 1, 2016.

=== Other entrants ===
The following pairs received wildcards into the main draw:

- (United States) Taylor Fritz / (United States) Ryan Harrison
- (Republic of Ireland) David O'Hare / (United Kingdom) Joe Salisbury
