= 2017 Memphis Open =

- Date: February 13–19
- Edition: 42nd
- Category: World Tour 250
- Draw: 28S / 16D
- Prize money: $642,750
- Surface: Hard / indoor
- Location: Memphis, Tennessee, United States
- Venue: Racquet Club of Memphis

Champions

Singles
- (United States) Ryan Harrison

Doubles
- (United States) Brian Baker / (Croatia) Nikola Mektić
← 2016 ·	Memphis Open

The 2017 Memphis Open was a tennis tournament, played on indoor hard courts. It was the 42nd edition of the Memphis Open, and part of the ATP World Tour 250 series of the 2017 ATP World Tour. It took place at the Racquet Club of Memphis in Memphis, Tennessee, United States, from 13 through 19 February 2017. Unseeded Ryan Harrison won the singles title.

== Points and prize money ==
=== Point distribution ===
Event	W	F	SF	QF	Round of 16	Round of 32	Q	Q2	Q1
Singles	250	150	90	45	20	0	12	6	0
Doubles	250	150	90	45	0	—	—	—	—

=== Prize money ===
Event	W	F	SF	QF	Round of 16	Round of 32	Q2	Q1
Singles	$114,595	$60,355	$32,695	$18,630	$10,975	$6,505	$2,925	$1,465
Doubles	$34,810	$18,300	$9,920	$5,670	$3,320	—	—	—
Doubles prize money per team

== Singles main-draw entrants ==
=== Seeds ===
Country	Player	Rank^{1}	Seed
CRO	Ivo Karlović	18	1
USA	John Isner	23	2
USA	Sam Querrey	27	3
USA	Steve Johnson	31	4
AUS	Bernard Tomic	33	5
FRA	Adrian Mannarino	56	6
BEL	Steve Darcis	59	7
TPE	Lu Yen-hsun	61	8

- ^{1} Rankings as of February 6, 2017

=== Other entrants ===
The following players received wildcards into the main draw:

- (United States) Jared Donaldson
- (United States) Reilly Opelka
- (United States) Frances Tiafoe

The following players received entry from the qualifying draw:

- (Australia) Matthew Ebden
- (Barbados) Darian King
- (Canada) Peter Polansky
- (United States) Tim Smyczek

The following player received entry as a lucky loser:

- (Germany) Benjamin Becker

=== Withdrawals ===
Before the tournament

- (Germany) Dustin Brown →replaced by (Germany) Benjamin Becker
- (United Kingdom) Daniel Evans →replaced by (Georgia (country)) Nikoloz Basilashvili

== Doubles main-draw entrants ==
=== Seeds ===
Country	Player	Country	Player	Rank^{1}	Seed
PHI	Treat Huey	BLR	Max Mirnyi	51	1
AUT	Oliver Marach	FRA	Fabrice Martin	68	2
SWE	Robert Lindstedt	NZL	Michael Venus	78	3
~~ESP~~	~~Guillermo García López~~	~~IND~~	~~Leander Paes~~	~~94~~	~~4~~

- ^{1} Rankings are as of February 6, 2017.

=== Other entrants ===
The following pairs received wildcards into the main draw:

- (Belgium) Cedric De Zutter / (United Kingdom) Connor Glennon
- (Republic of Ireland) David O'Hare / (United Kingdom) Joe Salisbury

=== Withdrawals ===
Before the tournament

- (Spain) Guillermo García López

== Finals ==
=== Singles ===
- (United States) Ryan Harrison defeated (Georgia (country)) Nikoloz Basilashvili, 6–1, 6–4

=== Doubles ===
- (United States) Brian Baker / (Croatia) Nikola Mektić defeated (United States) Ryan Harrison / (United States) Steve Johnson, 6–3, 6–4
