= 2017 Memphis Open – Doubles =

Doubles
- 2017 Memphis Open

Final
- Champions: (United States) Brian Baker (Croatia) Nikola Mektić
- Runners-up: (United States) Ryan Harrison (United States) Steve Johnson
- Score: 6–3, 6–4

Events
Singles	Doubles
← 2016 ·	Memphis Open

Mariusz Fyrstenberg and Santiago González were the two-time defending champions, but Fyrstenberg chose not to participate this year and González chose to compete in Buenos Aires instead.

Brian Baker and Nikola Mektić won the title, defeating Ryan Harrison and Steve Johnson in the final, 6–3, 6–4. This was the first doubles title for Baker and Mektic individually and as a pair.

== Seeds ==
1. (Philippines) Treat Huey / (Belarus) Max Mirnyi (quarterfinals)
2. (Austria) Oliver Marach / (France) Fabrice Martin (semifinals)
3. (Sweden) Robert Lindstedt / (New Zealand) Michael Venus (first round)
4. (Spain) Guillermo García López / (India) Leander Paes (withdrew)

== Draw ==
=== Key ===
- Q = Qualifier
- WC = Wild card
- LL = Lucky loser
- Alt = Alternate
- SE = Special exempt
- PR = Protected ranking
- ITF = ITF entry
- JE = Junior exempt
- w/o = Walkover
- r = Retired
- d = Defaulted
- SR = Special ranking

=== Draw ===
First round
1	(Philippines) T Huey (Belarus) M Mirnyi	7^{7}	7
WC	(Republic of Ireland) D O'Hare (United Kingdom) J Salisbury	6^{4}	5
PR	(Australia) M Ebden (Australia) B Tomic	6	6
(Belarus) A Bury (Chinese Taipei) Y-h Lu	0	3
4	(Spain) G García López (India) L Paes
(United States) B Baker (Croatia) N Mektić	w/o
(United States) S Querrey (United States) D Young	3	6	[10]
(India) J Nedunchezhiyan (Australia) J Thompson	6	3	[3]
WC	(Belgium) C De Zutter (United Kingdom) Connor Glennon	3	2
(United States) R Harrison (United States) S Johnson	6	6
(United States) J Cerretani (Austria) P Oswald	6	6
3	(Sweden) R Lindstedt (New Zealand) M Venus	1	2
(India) P Raja (India) D Sharan	3	4
(Israel) J Erlich (United States) S Lipsky	6	6
(Russia) K Kravchuk (France) A Mannarino	2	3
2	(Austria) O Marach (France) F Martin	6	6

Quarterfinals
1	(Philippines) T Huey (Belarus) M Mirnyi	6	6^{1}	[6]
PR	(Australia) M Ebden (Australia) B Tomic	4	7^{7}	[10]
(United States) B Baker (Croatia) N Mektić	6	7
(United States) S Querrey (United States) D Young	1	5
(United States) R Harrison (United States) S Johnson	6	6
(United States) J Cerretani (Austria) P Oswald	3	2
(Israel) J Erlich (United States) S Lipsky	3	7^{7}	[6]
2	(Austria) O Marach (France) F Martin	6	6^{2}	[10]

Semifinals
PR	(Australia) M Ebden (Australia) B Tomic	6^{1}	2
(United States) B Baker (Croatia) N Mektić	7^{7}	6
(United States) R Harrison (United States) S Johnson	7^{7}	6
2	(Austria) O Marach (France) F Martin	6^{5}	2

Final
(United States) B Baker (Croatia) N Mektić	6	6
(United States) R Harrison (United States) S Johnson	3	4
