= 2015 Memphis Open – Singles =

Singles
- 2015 Memphis Open

Final
- Champion: (Japan) Kei Nishikori
- Runner-up: (South Africa) Kevin Anderson
- Score: 6–4, 6–4

Details
- Draw: 28
- Seeds: 8

Events
Singles	Doubles
← 2014 ·	Memphis Open	· 2016 →

Kei Nishikori was the two-time defending champion and successfully defended his title, defeating Kevin Anderson 6–4, 6–4 in the final.

== Seeds ==
The top four seeds receive a bye into the second round.

1. (Japan) Kei Nishikori (champion)
2. (South Africa) Kevin Anderson (final)
3. (United States) John Isner (quarterfinals)
4. (Ukraine) Alexandr Dolgopolov (second round)

5. (Croatia) Ivo Karlović (second round)
6. (United States) Steve Johnson (quarterfinals)
7. (Germany) Benjamin Becker (first round)
8. (France) Adrian Mannarino (first round)

== Draw ==
=== Key ===
- Q = Qualifier
- WC = Wild card
- LL = Lucky loser
- Alt = Alternate
- SE = Special exempt
- PR = Protected ranking
- ITF = ITF entry
- JE = Junior exempt
- w/o = Walkover
- r = Retired
- d = Defaulted
- SR = Special ranking

=== Finals ===
Semifinals
1	(Japan) Kei Nishikori	5	7^{7}	7^{7}
(United States) Sam Querrey	7	6^{5}	6^{5}
(United States) Donald Young	6	3	4
2/WC	(South Africa) Kevin Anderson	4	6	6

Final
1	(Japan) Kei Nishikori	6	6
2/WC	(South Africa) Kevin Anderson	4	4

=== Top half ===
First round
Q	(United States) R Harrison	7^{7}	7^{7}
(Tunisia) M Jaziri	6^{3}	6^{1}
Q	(United States) A Krajicek	6	6^{3}	7^{10}
(Kazakhstan) M Kukushkin	2	7^{7}	6^{8}
(Slovakia) L Lacko	6^{7}	3
5	(Croatia) I Karlović	7^{9}	6
(Croatia) I Dodig	6	6
(Russia) T Gabashvili	2	2
WC	(United States) J Donaldson	7	6
WC	(United States) S Kozlov	5	0
(United States) S Querrey	4	6	6
7	(Germany) B Becker	6	2	1

Second round
1	(Japan) K Nishikori	3	6	6
Q	(United States) R Harrison	6	3	4
Q	(United States) A Krajicek	7^{7}	4	6
5	(Croatia) I Karlović	6^{4}	6	4
3	(United States) J Isner	6	7^{7}
(Croatia) I Dodig	4	6^{5}
WC	(United States) J Donaldson	4	1
(United States) S Querrey	6	6

Quarterfinals
1	(Japan) K Nishikori	4	6	6
Q	(United States) A Krajicek	6	3	4
3	(United States) J Isner	6^{3}	6^{2}
(United States) S Querrey	7^{7}	7^{7}

Semifinals
1	(Japan) K Nishikori	5	7^{7}	7^{7}
(United States) S Querrey	7	6^{5}	6^{5}

=== Bottom half ===
First round
8	(France) A Mannarino	3	6^{9}
(United States) D Young	6	7^{11}
Q	(United States) D Kudla	6	6
Q	(Australia) T Kokkinakis	3	4
(Netherlands) I Sijsling	6	3	2
(Australia) B Tomic	4	6	6
6	(United States) S Johnson	6	6
LL	(Serbia) F Krajinović	3	3
(Australia) M Matosevic	4	4
(Germany) D Brown	6	6
(Chinese Taipei) Y-h Lu	4	3
(Australia) S Groth	6	6

Second round
(United States) D Young	7	6
Q	(United States) D Kudla	5	3
(Australia) B Tomic	6	7
4	(Ukraine) A Dolgopolov	1	5
6	(United States) S Johnson	4	7	7^{7}
(Germany) D Brown	6	5	6^{3}
(Australia) S Groth	3	2
2/WC	(South Africa) K Anderson	6	6

Quarterfinals
(United States) D Young	7^{10}	4	7
(Australia) B Tomic	6^{8}	6	5
6	(United States) S Johnson	4	4
2/WC	(South Africa) K Anderson	6	6

Semifinals
(United States) D Young	6	3	4
2/WC	(South Africa) K Anderson	4	6	6

== Qualifying ==
=== Seeds ===
1. (Serbia) Filip Krajinović (qualifying competition, lucky loser)
2. (Spain) Adrián Menéndez Maceiras (second round)
3. (United States) Denis Kudla (qualified)
4. (Romania) Victor Hănescu (qualifying competition)
5. (Australia) Thanasi Kokkinakis (qualified)
6. (United States) Michael Russell (second round)
7. (United States) Austin Krajicek (qualified)
8. (United States) Ryan Harrison (qualified)

=== Qualifiers ===
1. (United States) Ryan Harrison
2. (United States) Austin Krajicek
3. (United States) Denis Kudla
4. (Australia) Thanasi Kokkinakis

=== Lucky losers ===
1. (Serbia) Filip Krajinović

=== Qualifying draw ===
==== First qualifier ====
First round
1	(Serbia) Filip Krajinović	2	6	6
WC	(United States) Francis Tiafoe	6	1	4
(Ukraine) Artem Smirnov	4	6	4
(Zimbabwe) Takanyi Garanganga	6	4	6
(Argentina) Guido Andreozzi	6	4	2
(United States) Alex Kuznetsov	2	6	6
(United States) Chase Buchanan	3	1
8	(United States) Ryan Harrison	6	6

Second round
1	(Serbia) Filip Krajinović	6	6
(Zimbabwe) Takanyi Garanganga	2	4
(United States) Alex Kuznetsov	1	3
8	(United States) Ryan Harrison	6	6

Qualifying competition
1	(Serbia) Filip Krajinović	6	3	3
8	(United States) Ryan Harrison	4	6	6

==== Second qualifier ====
First round
2	(Spain) Adrián Menéndez Maceiras	7^{13}	6
WC	(United States) Eric Quigley	6^{11}	3
(United States) Marcos Giron	7	6^{4}	6
(Argentina) Agustín Velotti	5	7^{7}	3
(United States) Dennis Novikov	6^{3}	5
(China) Wang Chuhan	7^{7}	7
(Colombia) Eduardo Struvay	3	6^{11}
7	(United States) Austin Krajicek	6	7^{13}

Second round
2	(Spain) Adrián Menéndez Maceiras	6^{4}	4
(United States) Marcos Giron	7^{7}	6
(China) Wang Chuhan	2	2
7	(United States) Austin Krajicek	6	6

Qualifying competition
(United States) Marcos Giron	4	4
7	(United States) Austin Krajicek	6	6

==== Third qualifier ====
First round
3	(United States) Denis Kudla	6	6
(United States) Daniel Nguyen	0	1
(Thailand) Danai Udomchoke	7	6
WC	(United States) Jarryd Woog	5	2
(United States) Robby Ginepri	6	6
(South Africa) Nicolaas Scholtz	2	3
PR	(Germany) Mischa Zverev	3	6	6^{2}
6	(United States) Michael Russell	6	2	7^{7}

Second round
3	(United States) Denis Kudla	6	6
(Thailand) Danai Udomchoke	2	1
(United States) Robby Ginepri	7^{7}	6
6	(United States) Michael Russell	6^{3}	1

Qualifying competition
3	(United States) Denis Kudla	6	6
(United States) Robby Ginepri	3	4

==== Fourth qualifier ====
First round
4	(Romania) Victor Hănescu	7^{7}	6
(Australia) John-Patrick Smith	6^{5}	4
(Bulgaria) Dimitar Kutrovsky	4	4
WC	(United States) Michael Mmoh	6	6
(United Kingdom) Liam Broady	5	6	6
(New Zealand) Michael Venus	7	4	3
(South Africa) Fritz Wolmarans	4	6^{3}
5	(Australia) Thanasi Kokkinakis	6	7^{7}

Second round
4	(Romania) Victor Hănescu	3	7^{7}	6
WC	(United States) Michael Mmoh	6	6^{2}	4
(United Kingdom) Liam Broady	6^{3}	6^{4}
5	(Australia) Thanasi Kokkinakis	7^{7}	7^{7}

Qualifying competition
4	(Romania) Victor Hănescu	6	3	3
5	(Australia) Thanasi Kokkinakis	3	6	6
