= 2017 Memphis Open – Singles =

Singles
- 2017 Memphis Open

Final
- Champion: (United States) Ryan Harrison
- Runner-up: (Georgia (country)) Nikoloz Basilashvili
- Score: 6–1, 6–4

Details
- Draw: 28 (4 Q / 3 WC )
- Seeds: 8

Events
Singles	Doubles
- Memphis Open

Kei Nishikori was the four-time defending champion, but chose to compete in Buenos Aires instead.

Ryan Harrison won his first ATP World Tour singles title, defeating Nikoloz Basilashvili in the final, 6–1, 6–4. This was the first time in the tournament's 41-year history that no seeded players reached the semifinals. It was also the first ATP tour level event where this happened since 2013 at Nice.

== Seeds ==
The top four seeds receive a bye into the second round.

1. (Croatia) Ivo Karlović (second round)
2. (United States) John Isner (quarterfinals)
3. (United States) Sam Querrey (second round)
4. (United States) Steve Johnson (quarterfinals)
5. (Australia) Bernard Tomic (first round)
6. (France) Adrian Mannarino (first round)
7. (Belgium) Steve Darcis (second round)
8. (Chinese Taipei) Lu Yen-hsun (first round)

== Draw ==
Key

- Q = Qualifier
- WC = Wild card
- LL = Lucky loser
- Alt = Alternate
- ITF = ITF entry
- PR = Protected ranking
- SR = Special ranking
- SE = Special exempt
- JE = Junior exempt
- JR = Junior Accelerator Programme entrant
- CO = College Accelerator Programme entrant
- NG = Next Gen Accelerator Program entrant
- w/o = Walkover
- r = Retired
- d = Defaulted

=== Finals ===
Semifinals
(Georgia (country)) Nikoloz Basilashvili	7^{7}	6
(Kazakhstan) Mikhail Kukushkin	6^{5}	1
(United States) Ryan Harrison	6	6
(United States) Donald Young	4	4

Final
(Georgia (country)) Nikoloz Basilashvili	1	4
(United States) Ryan Harrison	6	6

=== Top half ===
First round
(Georgia (country)) N Basilashvili	6	6
(Australia) J Thompson	3	0
Q	(Canada) P Polansky	7^{7}	3	1
Q	(Australia) M Ebden	6^{4}	6	6
(United States) T Fritz	4	7^{7}	7^{9}
8	(Chinese Taipei) Y-h Lu	6	6^{4}	6^{7}
WC	(United States) F Tiafoe	3	7	3
Q	(United States) T Smyczek	6	5	6
(Kazakhstan) M Kukushkin	6	6
LL	(Germany) B Becker	3	4
Q	(Barbados) D King	6	6
5	(Australia) B Tomic	4	4

Second round
1	(Croatia) I Karlović	6^{2}	3
(Georgia (country)) N Basilashvili	7^{7}	6
Q	(Australia) M Ebden	6	4	6
(United States) T Fritz	4	6	3
4	(United States) S Johnson	3	6	6
Q	(United States) T Smyczek	6	4	2
(Kazakhstan) M Kukushkin	6	6
Q	(Barbados) D King	3	0

Quarterfinals
(Georgia (country)) N Basilashvili	7^{7}	6
Q	(Australia) M Ebden	6^{3}	4
4	(United States) S Johnson	0	4
(Kazakhstan) M Kukushkin	6	6

Semifinals
(Georgia (country)) N Basilashvili	7^{7}	6
(Kazakhstan) M Kukushkin	6^{5}	1

=== Bottom half ===
First round
7	(Belgium) S Darcis	7	3	6
(Moldova) R Albot	5	6	4
(Bosnia and Herzegovina) D Džumhur	6^{6}	7^{7}	6
(South Africa) K Anderson	7^{8}	6^{2}	4
(United States) R Harrison	6	7
(Russia) K Kravchuk	3	5
6	(France) A Mannarino	6	5	6^{4}
(United States) D Young	3	7	7^{7}
WC	(United States) R Opelka	6	7
WC	(United States) J Donaldson	1	5
(Japan) Y Nishioka	6	6
(Spain) G García López	4	4

Second round
7	(Belgium) S Darcis	6^{2}	4
(Bosnia and Herzegovina) D Džumhur	7^{7}	6
(United States) R Harrison	6	6
3	(United States) S Querrey	3	1
(United States) D Young	7^{7}	6
WC	(United States) R Opelka	6^{3}	3
(Japan) Y Nishioka	6	3	4
2	(United States) J Isner	4	6	6

Quarterfinals
(Bosnia and Herzegovina) D Džumhur	3	4
(United States) R Harrison	6	6
(United States) D Young	7^{7}	3	7^{8}
2	(United States) J Isner	6^{5}	6	6^{6}

Semifinals
(United States) R Harrison	6	6
(United States) D Young	4	4

== Qualifying ==
=== Seeds ===
1. (Canada) Peter Polansky (qualified)
2. (Germany) Benjamin Becker (qualifying competition, lucky loser)
3. (United States) Denis Kudla (first round)
4. (Barbados) Darian King (qualified)
5. (Sweden) Elias Ymer (first round)
6. (United States) Tim Smyczek (qualified)
7. (Japan) Tatsuma Ito (qualifying competition, retired)
8. (Australia) Matthew Barton (qualifying competition)

=== Qualifiers ===
1. (Canada) Peter Polansky
2. (United States) Tim Smyczek
3. (Australia) Matthew Ebden
4. (Barbados) Darian King

=== Lucky loser ===
1. (Germany) Benjamin Becker

=== Qualifying draw ===
==== First qualifier ====
First round
1	(Canada) Peter Polansky	6	6
Alt	(India) Jeevan Nedunchezhiyan	3	3
WC	(United States) Tommy Paul	3	6	6^{5}
8	(Australia) Matthew Barton	6	3	7^{7}

Qualifying competition
1	(Canada) Peter Polansky	6	6
8	(Australia) Matthew Barton	2	1

==== Second qualifier ====
First round
2	(Germany) Benjamin Becker	6	6
Alt	(Croatia) Nikola Mektić	3	3
WC	(United States) Scott Lipsky	2	3
6	(United States) Tim Smyczek	6	6

Qualifying competition
2	(Germany) Benjamin Becker
6	(United States) Tim Smyczek	w/o

==== Third qualifier ====
First round
3	(United States) Denis Kudla	6^{4}	6	1
PR	(Australia) Matthew Ebden	7^{7}	1	6
Alt	(United States) Brian Baker	6	6
5	(Sweden) Elias Ymer	4	4

Qualifying competition
PR	(Australia) Matthew Ebden	6	6
Alt	(United States) Brian Baker	2	4

==== Fourth qualifier ====
First round
4	(Barbados) Darian King	6	6
Alt	(United Kingdom) Andrew Watson	2	3
(Republic of Ireland) James McGee	6	6^{4}	1
7	(Japan) Tatsuma Ito	4	7^{7}	6

Qualifying competition
4	(Barbados) Darian King	6	3
7	(Japan) Tatsuma Ito	1	0^{r}
