= 2015 Memphis Open – Doubles =

Doubles
- 2015 Memphis Open

Final
- Champions: (Poland) Mariusz Fyrstenberg (Mexico) Santiago González
- Runners-up: (New Zealand) Artem Sitak (United States) Donald Young
- Score: 5–7, 7–6^{(7–1)}, [10–8]

Events
Singles	Doubles
← 2014 ·	Memphis Open	· 2016 →

Eric Butorac and Raven Klaasen were the defending champions, but Klaasen chose to compete in Rotterdam instead. Butorac played alongside Rajeev Ram, but they lost in the quarterfinals to Artem Sitak and Donald Young.

== Seeds ==
1. (Croatia) Ivan Dodig / (Belarus) Max Mirnyi (semifinals)
2. (Australia) Sam Groth / (Australia) Chris Guccione (first round)
3. (United States) Eric Butorac / (United States) Rajeev Ram (quarterfinals)
4. (Poland) Mariusz Fyrstenberg / (Mexico) Santiago González (champions)

== Draw ==
=== Key ===
- Q = Qualifier
- WC = Wild card
- LL = Lucky loser
- Alt = Alternate
- SE = Special exempt
- PR = Protected ranking
- ITF = ITF entry
- JE = Junior exempt
- w/o = Walkover
- r = Retired
- d = Defaulted
- SR = Special ranking

=== Draw ===
First round
1	(Croatia) I Dodig (Belarus) M Mirnyi	7	7^{9}
(Sweden) J Brunström (United States) N Monroe	5	6^{7}
WC	(United States) S Kozlov (United States) D Kudla	3	1
(Australia) J-P Smith (New Zealand) M Venus	6	6
4	(Poland) M Fyrstenberg (Mexico) S González	6	6
(Kazakhstan) M Kukushkin (Chinese Taipei) Y-h Lu	3	1
(Russia) T Gabashvili (Australia) B Tomic
(Germany) B Becker (Germany) D Meffert	w/o
(United States) S Johnson (United States) S Querrey	1	4
(New Zealand) A Sitak (United States) D Young	6	6
WC	(United States) M Mmoh (United States) F Tiafoe	2	4
3	(United States) E Butorac (United States) R Ram	6	6
(United States) R Harrison (United States) A Krajicek	6	6
(Germany) D Brown (Australia) M Matosevic	3	2
(Philippines) T Huey (United States) S Lipsky	7	6
2	(Australia) S Groth (Australia) C Guccione	5	4

Quarterfinals
1	(Croatia) I Dodig (Belarus) M Mirnyi	6	6
(Australia) J-P Smith (New Zealand) M Venus	3	4
4	(Poland) M Fyrstenberg (Mexico) S González	7	7
(Germany) B Becker (Germany) D Meffert	5	5
(New Zealand) A Sitak (United States) D Young	6	7
3	(United States) E Butorac (United States) R Ram	3	5
(United States) R Harrison (United States) A Krajicek	6	4	[4]
(Philippines) T Huey (United States) S Lipsky	4	6	[10]

Semifinals
1	(Croatia) I Dodig (Belarus) M Mirnyi	7^{7}	4	[5]
4	(Poland) M Fyrstenberg (Mexico) S González	6^{4}	6	[10]
(New Zealand) A Sitak (United States) D Young	7^{7}	6
(Philippines) T Huey (United States) S Lipsky	6^{0}	4

Final
4	(Poland) M Fyrstenberg (Mexico) S González	5	7^{7}	[10]
(New Zealand) A Sitak (United States) D Young	7	6^{1}	[8]
