= 2016 Memphis Open – Doubles =

Doubles
- 2016 Memphis Open

Final
- Champions: (Poland) Mariusz Fyrstenberg (Mexico) Santiago González
- Runners-up: (United States) Steve Johnson (United States) Sam Querrey
- Score: 6–4, 6–4

Events
Singles	Doubles
← 2015 ·	Memphis Open	· 2017 →

Mariusz Fyrstenberg and Santiago González were the defending champions and successfully defended the title, defeating Steve Johnson and Sam Querrey, in the final 6–4, 6–4.

== Seeds ==
1. (United States) Bob Bryan / (United States) Mike Bryan (first round)
2. (Philippines) Treat Huey / (Belarus) Max Mirnyi (first round)
3. (United States) Eric Butorac / (United States) Scott Lipsky (quarterfinals)
4. (United States) Steve Johnson / (United States) Sam Querrey (final)

== Draw ==
=== Key ===
- Q = Qualifier
- WC = Wild card
- LL = Lucky loser
- Alt = Alternate
- SE = Special exempt
- PR = Protected ranking
- ITF = ITF entry
- JE = Junior exempt
- w/o = Walkover
- r = Retired
- d = Defaulted
- SR = Special ranking

=== Draw ===
First round
1	(United States) B Bryan (United States) M Bryan	6	6^{5}	[10]
(United States) A Krajicek (United States) N Monroe	1	7^{7}	[12]
(Poland) M Fyrstenberg (Mexico) S González	7	7^{9}
(Australia) C Guccione (Austria) P Oswald	5	6^{7}
3	(United States) E Butorac (United States) S Lipsky	6	7^{7}
(United States) D Kudla (United States) D Young	2	6^{1}
(Austria) O Marach (France) F Martin	7	6
PR	(Czech Republic) L Dlouhý (India) L Paes	5	1
PR	(Poland) T Bednarek (Canada) A Shamasdin	2	2
(Netherlands) W Koolhof (Netherlands) M Middelkoop	6	6
(Spain) M Granollers (Australia) S Groth	3	4
4	(United States) S Johnson (United States) S Querrey	6	6
(New Zealand) M Daniell (New Zealand) A Sitak	2	6	[10]
WC	(Republic of Ireland) D O'Hare (United Kingdom) J Salisbury	6	3	[5]
WC	(United States) T Fritz (United States) R Harrison	7^{7}	6
2	(Philippines) T Huey (Belarus) M Mirnyi	6^{3}	4

Quarterfinals
(United States) A Krajicek (United States) N Monroe	3	3
(Poland) M Fyrstenberg (Mexico) S González	6	6
3	(United States) E Butorac (United States) S Lipsky	5	4
(Austria) O Marach (France) F Martin	7	6
(Netherlands) W Koolhof (Netherlands) M Middelkoop	3	4
4	(United States) S Johnson (United States) S Querrey	6	6
(New Zealand) M Daniell (New Zealand) A Sitak	2	7^{7}	[10]
WC	(United States) T Fritz (United States) R Harrison	6	6^{4}	[12]

Semifinals
(Poland) M Fyrstenberg (Mexico) S González	6^{7}	7	[15]
(Austria) O Marach (France) F Martin	7^{9}	5	[13]
4	(United States) S Johnson (United States) S Querrey	6	6
WC	(United States) T Fritz (United States) R Harrison	1	2

Final
(Poland) M Fyrstenberg (Mexico) S González	6	6
4	(United States) S Johnson (United States) S Querrey	4	4
