= Cedric De Zutter =

Belgian tennis player

- Country (sports): Belgium
- Born: 27 January 1992 (age 33); Eeklo, Belgium
- Plays: Right-handed
- Prize money: $1,225

Singles
- Career record: 0–0 (at ATP Tour level, Grand Slam level, and in Davis Cup)
- Career titles: 0 ITF

Doubles
- Career record: 0–1 (at ATP Tour level, Grand Slam level, and in Davis Cup)
- Career titles: 1 ITF
- Highest ranking: No. 913 (26 August 2013)
- Last updated on: 13.

Cedric De Zutter (born 27 January 1992) is a Belgian tennis player.

De Zutter has a career high ATP doubles ranking of 913 achieved on 26 August 2013.

De Zutter made his ATP main draw debut at the 2017 Memphis Open in the doubles draw partnering Connor Glennon.
