= Memphis Open (tennis) =

Defunct tennis tournament
- Founded: 1975
- Abolished: 2017
- Editions: 43
- Location: Memphis, Tennessee, United States
- Venue: Racquet Club of Memphis
- Category: 250 series
- Surface: Hard / indoor
- Website: memphisopen.com

The Memphis Open was a professional tennis tournament that ran from 1975 to 2017. From 1977 onwards, the event was held at the Racquet Club of Memphis in Memphis, Tennessee. The Memphis Open was the only ATP event in the United States which was played on indoor hardcourts; it usually took place in February. For part of its history it was a combined men's and women's tournament, but for its final four years it was solely a men's tournament.

The event was previously known under various sponsored names including the Regions Morgan Keegan Championships, the Kroger St. Jude Championship, the Volvo Championships, the Cellular South Cup, and the Federal Express International and was for a period time part of the now defunct U.S. National Indoor Tennis Championships.

The last singles champion of the Memphis Open was Ryan Harrison and the last doubles champions are Brian Baker and Nikola Mektić. The 2017 Memphis Open titles were the first career titles for all three men. As of 2018, the tournament has moved to New York as the new New York Open.

== History ==
Center Court at the 2016 Memphis Open

In 1974, Memphis cotton merchant William B. "Billy" Dunavant Jr. purchased the Memphis Athletic Club and began a $7 M expansion to transform the facility into what is now the Racquet Club of Memphis. What is now known as the Memphis Open was first played in 1975 on indoor carpet as part of the WCT. In 1977, the U.S. National Indoor Tennis Championships moved to Memphis from Salisbury, Maryland and increased the event's prize money to $220,000. The Memphis Open had the distinction (until 2014) of being the only private indoor racquet club in the world to host a men's and women's professional tennis event. The tournament was played on indoor carpet into the 1980s, but the club eventually changed its surface to hard courts.

In November 2001, the Racquet Club of Memphis purchased the rights to the WTA event in Oklahoma City and moved it to Memphis, where the tournament hosted both men's and women's events for 12 years. In 2008, the event was elevated to ATP 500 Series status. In 2014, the men's and women's events moved to Rio de Janeiro. Memphis then purchased the ATP 250 event in San Jose to keep professional tennis in the city. In late 2014, Tennis Rendezvous LLC, owned by the USTA and Golden Set Holdings LLC, purchased the U.S. National Indoor Tennis Championships and renamed it the Memphis Open. In 2015, the Memphis Open was sold again, purchased by New York-based financial management company GF Capital.

Over the years, the Memphis Open has counted nine ATP year-end No. 1 players among its winners: Bjorn Borg, Jimmy Connors, John McEnroe, Stefan Edberg, Andre Agassi, Ivan Lendl, Jim Courier, Pete Sampras, and Andy Roddick. In 2016, Kei Nishikori won the event for a fourth consecutive time, tying Connors' record for the most overall Memphis titles.

In April 2017 the ATP announced that the tournament will relocate to the Nassau Veterans Memorial Coliseum in Long Island, New York in 2018 after the event failed to find a title sponsor in Memphis.

== Finals ==
=== Singles ===
Year	Champions	Runners-up	Score
1975	(United States) Harold Solomon	(Czechoslovakia) Jiří Hřebec	2–6, 6–1, 6–4
1976	(India) Vijay Amritraj	(United States) Stan Smith	6–2, 0–6, 6–0
1977	(Sweden) Björn Borg	(United States) Brian Gottfried	6–4, 6–3, 4–6, 7–5
1978	(United States) Jimmy Connors	(United States) Tim Gullikson	7–6^{(7–3)}, 6–3
1979	(United States) Jimmy Connors	(United States) Arthur Ashe	6–4, 5–7, 6–3
1980	(United States) John McEnroe	(United States) Jimmy Connors	7–6^{(8–6)}, 7–6^{(7–4)}
1981	(United States) Gene Mayer	(United States) Roscoe Tanner	6–2, 6–4
1982	(South Africa) Johan Kriek	(United States) John McEnroe	6–3, 3–6, 6–4
1983	(United States) Jimmy Connors	(United States) Gene Mayer	7–5, 6–0
1984	(United States) Jimmy Connors	(France) Henri Leconte	6–3, 4–6, 7–5
1985	(Sweden) Stefan Edberg	(France) Yannick Noah	6–1, 6–0
1986	(United States) Brad Gilbert	(Sweden) Stefan Edberg	7–5, 7–6^{(7–3)}
1987	(Sweden) Stefan Edberg	(United States) Jimmy Connors	6–3, 2–1 (retired)
1988	(United States) Andre Agassi	(Sweden) Mikael Pernfors	6–4, 6–4, 7–5
1989	(United States) Brad Gilbert	(United States) Johan Kriek	6–2, 6–2 (retired)
1990	(West Germany) Michael Stich	(Australia) Wally Masur	6–7^{(5–7)}, 6–4, 7–6^{(7–1)}
1991	(Czechoslovakia) Ivan Lendl	(Germany) Michael Stich	7–5, 6–3
1992	(United States) MaliVai Washington	(South Africa) Wayne Ferreira	6–3, 6–2
1993	(United States) Jim Courier	(United States) Todd Martin	5–7, 7–6^{(7–4)}, 7–6^{(7–4)}
1994	(United States) Todd Martin	(United States) Brad Gilbert	6–4, 7–5
1995	(United States) Todd Martin	(Netherlands) Paul Haarhuis	7–6^{(7–2)}, 6–4
1996	(United States) Pete Sampras	(United States) Todd Martin	6–4, 7–6^{(7–2)}
1997	(United States) Michael Chang	(Australia) Todd Woodbridge	6–3, 6–4
1998	(Australia) Mark Philippoussis	(United States) Michael Chang	6–3, 6–2
1999	(Germany) Tommy Haas	(United States) Jim Courier	6–4, 6–1
2000	(Sweden) Magnus Larsson	(Zimbabwe) Byron Black	6–2, 1–6, 6–3
2001	(Australia) Mark Philippoussis	(Italy) Davide Sanguinetti	6–3, 6–7^{(5–7)}, 6–3
2002	(United States) Andy Roddick	(United States) James Blake	6–4, 3–6, 7–5
2003	(United States) Taylor Dent	(United States) Andy Roddick	6–1, 6–4
2004	(Sweden) Joachim Johansson	(Germany) Nicolas Kiefer	7–6^{(7–5)}, 6–3
2005	(Denmark) Kenneth Carlsen	(Belarus) Max Mirnyi	7–5, 7–5
2006	(Germany) Tommy Haas	(Sweden) Robin Söderling	6–3, 6–2
2007	(Germany) Tommy Haas	(United States) Andy Roddick	6–3, 6–2
2008	(Belgium) Steve Darcis	(Sweden) Robin Söderling	6–3, 7–6^{(7–5)}
2009	(United States) Andy Roddick	(Czech Republic) Radek Štěpánek	7–5, 7–5
2010	(United States) Sam Querrey	(United States) John Isner	6–7^{(3–7)}, 7–6^{(7–5)}, 6–3
2011	(United States) Andy Roddick	(Canada) Milos Raonic	7–6^{(9–7)}, 6–7^{(11–13)}, 7–5
2012	(Austria) Jürgen Melzer	(Canada) Milos Raonic	7–5, 7–6^{(7–4)}
2013	(Japan) Kei Nishikori	(Spain) Feliciano López	6–2, 6–3
2014	(Japan) Kei Nishikori	(Croatia) Ivo Karlović	6–4, 7–6^{(7–0)}
2015	(Japan) Kei Nishikori	(South Africa) Kevin Anderson	6–4, 6–4
2016	(Japan) Kei Nishikori	(United States) Taylor Fritz	6–4, 6–4
2017	(United States) Ryan Harrison	(Georgia (country)) Nikoloz Basilashvili	6–1, 6–4
2018	see New York Open		

=== Doubles ===
Year	Champions	Runners-up	Score
1975	(United States) Dick Stockton (United States) Erik van Dillen	(United Kingdom) Mark Cox (South Africa) Cliff Drysdale	1–6, 7–5, 6–4
1976	(India) Vijay Amritraj (India) Anand Amritraj	(United States) Marty Riessen (United States) Roscoe Tanner	6–3, 6–4
1977	(United States) Sherwood Stewart (United States) Fred McNair	(United States) Robert Lutz (United States) Stan Smith	4–6, 7–6, 7–6
1978	(United States) Brian Gottfried (Mexico) Raúl Ramírez	(Australia) Phil Dent (Australia) John Newcombe	3–6, 7–6, 6–2
1979	(Netherlands) Tom Okker (Poland) Wojciech Fibak	(South Africa) Frew McMillan (United States) Dick Stockton	6–4, 6–4
1980	(United States) John McEnroe (United States) Brian Gottfried	(Australia) Rod Frawley (Czechoslovakia) Tomáš Šmíd	6–3, 6–7, 7–6
1981	(United States) Gene Mayer (United States) Sandy Mayer	(United States) Mike Cahill (United States) Tom Gullikson	7–6, 6–7, 7–6
1982	(South Africa) Kevin Curren (United States) Steve Denton	(United States) John McEnroe (United States) Peter Fleming	7–6, 4–6, 6–2
1983	(Australia) Peter McNamara (Australia) Paul McNamee	(United States) Tim Gullikson (United States) Tom Gullikson	6–3, 5–7, 6–4
1984	(United States) Fritz Buehning (United States) Peter Fleming	(Switzerland) Heinz Günthardt (Czechoslovakia) Tomáš Šmíd	6–3, 6–0
1985	(Czechoslovakia) Pavel Složil (Czechoslovakia) Tomáš Šmíd	(South Africa) Kevin Curren (United States) Steve Denton	1–6, 6–3, 6–4
1986	(United States) Ken Flach (United States) Robert Seguso	(France) Guy Forget (Sweden) Anders Järryd	6–4, 4–6, 7–6
1987	(Sweden) Anders Järryd (Sweden) Jonas Svensson	(Spain) Sergio Casal (Spain) Emilio Sánchez	6–4, 6–2
1988	(United States) Kevin Curren (United States) David Pate	(Sweden) Peter Lundgren (Sweden) Mikael Pernfors	6–2, 6–2
1989	(United States) Paul Annacone (South Africa) Christo van Rensburg	(United States) Scott Davis (United States) Tim Wilkison	7–6, 6–7, 6–1
1990	(Australia) Darren Cahill (Australia) Mark Kratzmann	(West Germany) Udo Riglewski (West Germany) Michael Stich	7–5, 6–2
1991	(Germany) Michael Stich (Germany) Udo Riglewski	(Australia) John Fitzgerald (Australia) Laurie Warder	7–5, 6–3
1992	(Australia) Todd Woodbridge (Australia) Mark Woodforde	(United States) Kevin Curren (South Africa) Gary Muller	7–6, 6–1
1993	(Australia) Todd Woodbridge (Australia) Mark Woodforde	(Netherlands) Jacco Eltingh (Netherlands) Paul Haarhuis	7–5, 4–6, 7–6
1994	(Zimbabwe) Byron Black (United States) Jonathan Stark	(United States) Jim Grabb (United States) Jared Palmer	7–6, 6–4
1995	(United States) Jared Palmer (United States) Richey Reneberg	(United States) Tommy Ho (New Zealand) Brett Steven	4–6, 7–6, 6–1
1996	(The Bahamas) Mark Knowles (Canada) Daniel Nestor	(Australia) Todd Woodbridge (Australia) Mark Woodforde	6–4, 7–5
1997	(South Africa) Ellis Ferreira (United States) Patrick Galbraith	(United States) Rick Leach (United States) Jonathan Stark	6–3, 3–6, 6–1
1998	(Australia) Todd Woodbridge (Australia) Mark Woodforde	(South Africa) Ellis Ferreira (Mexico) David Roditi	6–3, 6–4
1999	(Australia) Todd Woodbridge (Australia) Mark Woodforde	(Canada) Sébastien Lareau (United States) Alex O'Brien	6–3, 6–4
2000	(United States) Justin Gimelstob (Canada) Sébastien Lareau	(United States) Jim Grabb (United States) Richey Reneberg	6–2, 6–4
2001	(United States) Bob Bryan (United States) Mike Bryan	(United States) Alex O'Brien (United States) Jonathan Stark	6–3, 7–6
2002	(United States) Brian MacPhie (Serbia and Montenegro) Nenad Zimonjić	(United States) Bob Bryan (United States) Mike Bryan	6–3, 3–6, [10–4]
2003	(The Bahamas) Mark Knowles (Canada) Daniel Nestor	(United States) Bob Bryan (United States) Mike Bryan	6–2, 7–6
2004	(United States) Bob Bryan (United States) Mike Bryan	(South Africa) Jeff Coetzee (South Africa) Chris Haggard	6–3, 6–4
2005	(Sweden) Simon Aspelin (Australia) Todd Perry	(United States) Bob Bryan (United States) Mike Bryan	6–4, 6–4
2006	(Croatia) Ivo Karlović (South Africa) Chris Haggard	(United States) James Blake (United States) Mardy Fish	0–6, 7–5, [10–5]
2007	(United States) Eric Butorac (United Kingdom) Jamie Murray	(Austria) Julian Knowle (Austria) Jürgen Melzer	7–5, 6–3
2008	(India) Mahesh Bhupathi (The Bahamas) Mark Knowles	(Thailand) Sanchai Ratiwatana (Thailand) Sonchat Ratiwatana	7–6^{(7–5)}, 6–2
2009	(United States) Mardy Fish (The Bahamas) Mark Knowles	(United States) Travis Parrott (Slovakia) Filip Polášek	7–6^{(9–7)}, 6–1
2010	(United States) John Isner (United States) Sam Querrey	(United Kingdom) Ross Hutchins (Australia) Jordan Kerr	6–4, 6–4
2011	(Belarus) Max Mirnyi (Canada) Daniel Nestor	(United States) Eric Butorac (Curaçao) Jean-Julien Rojer	6–2, 6–7^{(6–8)}, [10–3]
2012	(Belarus) Max Mirnyi (Canada) Daniel Nestor	(Croatia) Ivan Dodig (Brazil) Marcelo Melo	4–6, 7–5, [10–7]
2013	(United States) Bob Bryan (United States) Mike Bryan	(United States) James Blake (United States) Jack Sock	6–1, 6-2
2014	(United States) Eric Butorac (South Africa) Raven Klaasen	(United States) Bob Bryan (United States) Mike Bryan	6–4, 6-4
2015	(Poland) Mariusz Fyrstenberg (Mexico) Santiago González	(New Zealand) Artem Sitak (United States) Donald Young	5–7, 7–6^{(7–1)}, [10–8]
2016	(Poland) Mariusz Fyrstenberg (Mexico) Santiago González	(United States) Steve Johnson (United States) Sam Querrey	6–4, 6–4
2017	(United States) Brian Baker (Croatia) Nikola Mektić	(United States) Ryan Harrison (United States) Steve Johnson	6–3, 6–4

== Records ==
Record	Player(s)	Count	Years
Winner of most Men's Singles titles	(United States) Jimmy Connors (Japan) Kei Nishikori	4	1977, 1978, 1983, 1984; 2013, 2014, 2015, 2016
Winner of most consecutive Men's Singles titles	(Japan) Kei Nishikori	4	2013, 2014, 2015, 2016
Most Men's Singles finals	(United States) Jimmy Connors	6	1978, 1979, 1980, 1983, 1984, 1987
Winner of most Men's Doubles titles (individual & team)	(Australia) Todd Woodbridge & Mark Woodforde	4	1992, 1993, 1998, 1999
Winner of most consecutive Men's Doubles titles (individual & team)	(Australia) Todd Woodbridge & (Australia) Mark Woodforde (Poland) Mariusz Fyrstenberg & (Mexico) Santiago Gonzalez	2	1992, 1993 & 1998, 1999; 2015, 2016
Most Men's Doubles finals (individual & team)	(United States) Bob Bryan & (United States) Mike Bryan	7	2001, 2002, 2003, 2004, 2005, 2013, 2014

== See also ==
- List of tennis tournaments
- ATP World Tour

Awards and achievements
Preceded by None	ATP World Series Tournament of the Year; 1990	Succeeded by (Switzerland) Gstaad
