= Kei Nishikori =

Japanese tennis player (born 1989)

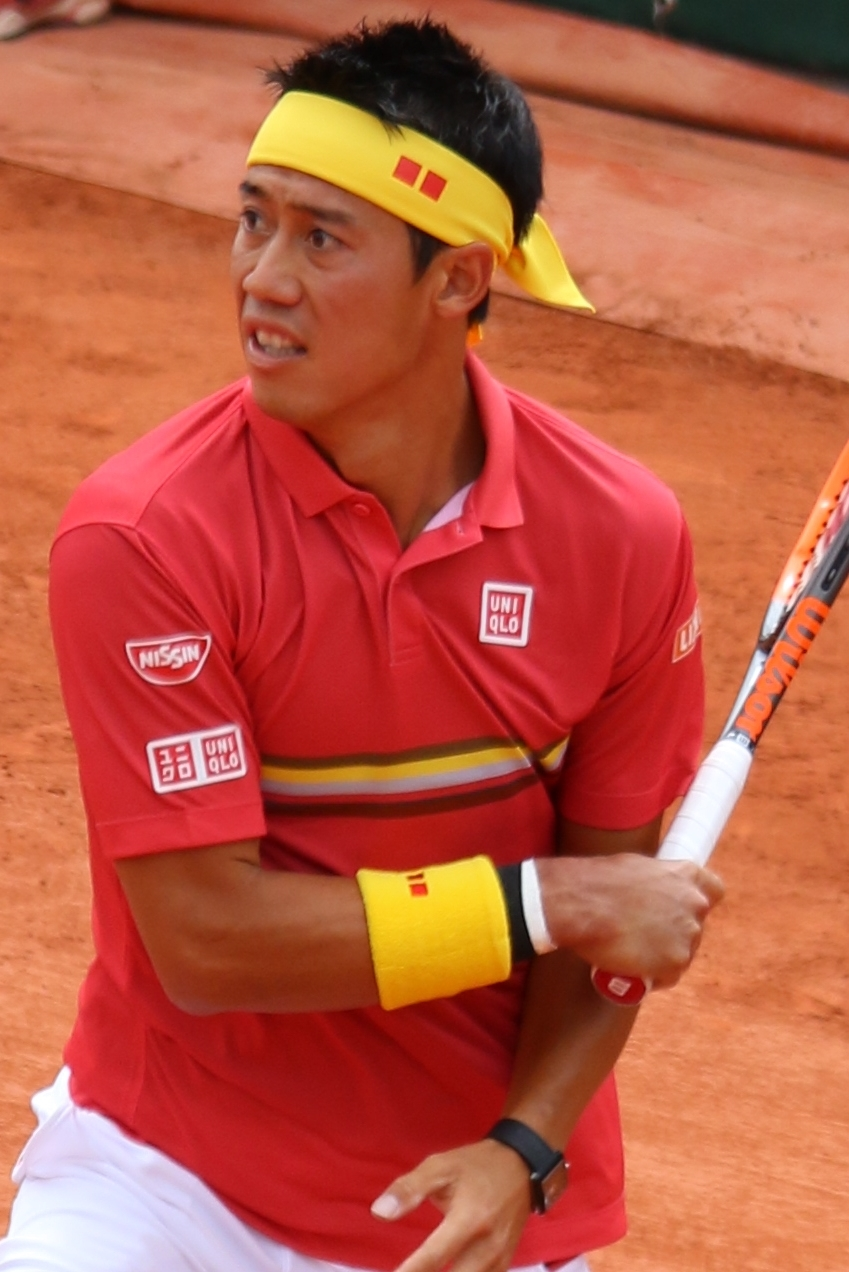
- Nishikori at the 2018 French Open
- Native name: 錦織 圭
- Country (sports): Japan
- Residence: Bradenton, Florida, United States
- Born: 29 December 1989 (age 36) Matsue, Shimane, Japan
- Height: 1.78 m (5 ft 10 in)
- Turned pro: 2007
- Retired: 1 October 2026
- Prize money: US $26,225,552
- Official website: keinishikori.com

Singles
- Career record: 452–232 (66.1%)
- Career titles: 12
- Highest ranking: No. 4 (2 March 2015)

Grand Slam singles results
- Australian Open: QF (2012, 2015, 2016, 2019)
- French Open: QF (2015, 2017, 2019)
- Wimbledon: QF (2018, 2019)
- US Open: F (2014)

Other tournaments
- Tour Finals: SF (2014, 2016)
- Olympic Games: Bronze (2016)

Doubles
- Career record: 27–36 (42.9%)
- Career titles: 0
- Highest ranking: No. 167 (19 March 2012)

Grand Slam doubles results
- French Open: 2R (2011)
- Wimbledon: 2R (2011)

Other doubles tournaments
- Olympic Games: QF (2021)

Team competitions
- Davis Cup: QF (2014)
Medal record
Men's tennis
Representing Japan
Olympic Games
Bronze medal – third place	2016 Rio de Janeiro	Singles

Kei Nishikori (錦織 圭, Nishikori Kei; [ɲiɕi̥koꜜɾi keꜜː]; born 29 December 1989) is a Japanese former professional tennis player. He was ranked as high as world No. 4 in men's singles by the Association of Tennis Professionals, making him the highest-ranked Japanese man in the Open Era and the second-highest-ranked of all time (after Jiro Sato). Nishikori won twelve singles titles on the ATP Tour and was runner-up at the 2014 US Open (upsetting world No. 1 Novak Djokovic en route), making him the only man representing an Asian country to contest a major singles final. (Note: An American man of Asian descent, Michael Chang, reached and won a major final at the 1989 French Open, and was a runner-up at both the US Open and Australian Open. After his own professional career, Chang became Nishikori's coach in 2014.)

In addition, Nishikori defeated Rafael Nadal to win the bronze medal in singles at the 2016 Rio Olympics, bringing Japan its first Olympic tennis medal in 96 years. He holds the third best percentage of deciding-set wins in the Open Era at 72.4%, and has the third-highest win percentage in matches extending to five sets, with a record of 29–8 and a win percentage of 78.4%.

== Personal life ==
Nishikori was born in Matsue in Shimane Prefecture, Japan. His father, Kiyoshi, is an engineer, and his mother, Eri, is a piano teacher. He has an older sister, Reina, who graduated from college and works in Tokyo. He began playing tennis at the age of five. He first won the All Japan Tennis Championships for Kids in 2001, and graduated from Aomori-Yamada High School.

Nishikori moved to Bradenton, Florida to join the IMG Academy in 2004 at 14 years of age. Nishikori was previously coached by Brad Gilbert, Dante Bottini, Michael Chang and Thomas Johansson.

Nishikori married his long-term girlfriend Mai Yamauchi in December 2020. They have a son together. In 2025, Nishikori was alleged to have been having an affair with Japanese model Azuki Oguchi. He issued a statement apologising for his conduct. His pastimes include soccer, golf, reading, and listening to music.

== Career ==
=== Juniors ===
Nishikori played his first junior match in April 2002 at the age of 13 at a grade 1 tournament in Japan. He won the 2004 title at the Riad 21 Tournament in Rabat, Morocco, and was a boys' singles quarter-finalist at the 2006 Junior French Open; he partnering Emiliano Massa to win the boys' doubles title at that tournament. Nishikori won the 2007 Luxilon Cup held at the 2007 Sony Ericsson Open by defeating Michael McClune.

As a junior, he compiled a 73–37 win–loss record in singles and 53–31 in doubles, achieving a combined ranking of No. 7 in the world in July 2006.

==== Junior Grand Slam results ====
Singles:

Australian Open: QF (2006)
French Open: QF (2006)
Wimbledon: 1R (2005)
US Open: 3R (2005)

Doubles:

Australian Open: SF (2006)
French Open: W (2006)
Wimbledon: A (-)
US Open: 1R (2005)

=== 2006: Beginnings ===
Nishikori began the year in March with a wildcard entry to the Kyoto Challenger tournament in Kyoto, Japan, where he lost to Australian Robert Smeets in the round of 32 and just failed to qualify for the doubles tournament. In May, Nishikori qualified for the ITF Futures event in Mazatlán, Mexico, where he was victorious in the men's singles.

=== 2007: Turned professional ===
A finalist in two USTA Pro Circuit events, Nishikori lost to Donald Young in Little Rock, Arkansas and Alex Bogomolov Jr. in Carson, California. He partnered with Young to win the doubles title at Little Rock. At the Sony Ericsson Open in Miami, Nishikori paired with triple French Open champion Gustavo Kuerten, but the two were defeated in the first round. Nishikori served as a hitting partner for Roger Federer at Wimbledon.

After his ATP main draw debut in Los Angeles, Nishikori qualified for the Indianapolis Tennis Championships in July. He beat Alejandro Falla in the first round to record his first ATP main-draw win. He followed that up with a three-set win over Michael Berrer, the eliminator of seventh seed Robby Ginepri, to advance to his first ATP quarterfinal. Although he lost to Dmitry Tursunov in two sets, Nishikori became the youngest player to reach the quarterfinals at Indianapolis since Boris Becker in 1985.

Later that month, Nishikori headed to Washington, D.C. for his third career ATP event. He defeated Teymuraz Gabashvili in the first round before falling to Julien Benneteau in the second. He qualified for the China Open in Beijing, losing in the first round to Ivan Ljubičić. In October, Nishikori received a wildcard entry to the AIG Japan Open Tennis Championships in Tokyo, where he lost in the first round to Zack Fleishman. He participated in the tournament's draw ceremony and was honored with an award from the Tokyo Sports Writers Club. Nishikori finished the year representing Japan at the Asian Hopman Cup competition in Bangkok, Thailand.

=== 2008: First ATP title ===
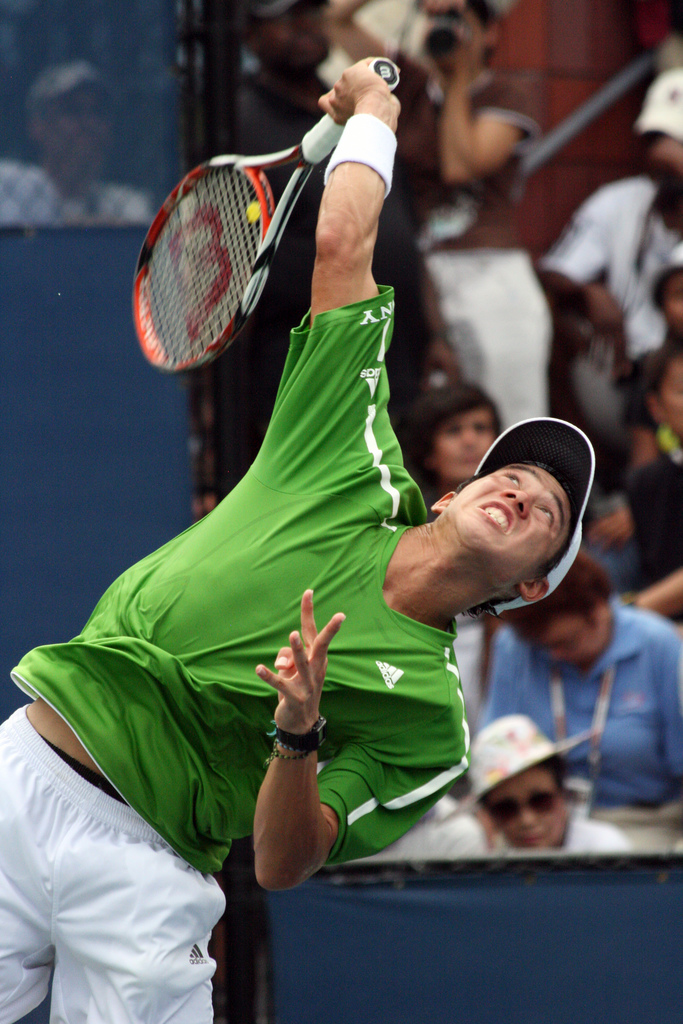
Nishikori at the 2008 US Open.

Nishikori started the year by reaching the semifinals of the Miami challenger tournament. He then entered the Delray Beach tournament as a qualifier ranked world No. 244. He gained entrance to the main draw by defeating Nicolás Todero and Alex Bogomolov Jr. In the first round, he defeated Florian Mayer due to a retirement in the second set. In the second round, Nishikori defeated Amer Delić, another qualifier. In the quarterfinals, he won against Bobby Reynolds. In the semifinals, he upset Sam Querrey. In the final, Nishikori upset top seed James Blake in three sets to become the first Japanese man in nearly 16 years to win an ATP event.

Nishikori lost in the first round of the Miami Masters to the Spanish player Albert Montañés. He faced James Blake again, this time at the River Oaks International tournament in Houston, Texas in the first round, but Kei lost in two sets. He went out in the third round of the 2008 Queen's Club Championships against Rafael Nadal in just over two hours. Facing the world No. 2, Nishikori played well in the match and showed promise. His first Grand Slam appearance at the 2008 Wimbledon Championships on 23 June 2008 ended in a first-round forfeiture to French player Marc Gicquel. Suffering from an abdominal muscle strain, Nishikori retired after the second set. In August, he entered the Beijing Olympics on a wildcard. There, he lost in the first round to Rainer Schüttler of Germany.

Nishikori made his debut at the US Open, defeating 29th seeded Juan Mónaco in the first round. He cruised to the third round, after downing Croatian Roko Karanušić. On 30 August 2008, he became the first Japanese player to reach the round of 16 at the US Open in 71 years, when he beat fourth seed David Ferrer in five sets in what was considered one of the tournament's major upsets. He lost his chance, however, to compete in the quarterfinals when he was beaten by 17th seed Juan Martín del Potro in straight sets.

In the Japan Open Tennis Championships, he made it to the round of 16, before losing to Frenchman Richard Gasquet.

Nishikori was given a wildcard for the Stockholm Open, where he made it to his second ATP level semifinal of the year, despite playing with a knee injury. He received a walkover in his quarterfinal match against Mario Ančić, who had to withdraw due to illness. In the semifinals, he was beaten by fourth seed Robin Söderling.

=== 2009: Injury season ===
Nishikori made a disappointing start to the season, losing to Jürgen Melzer in the first round of the Australian Open. On 25 March, Nishikori was named 2008 ATP Newcomer of the Year and became the first Asian player to win the award. He withdrew from the French Open, Wimbledon, and the US Open because of an injured right elbow.

=== 2010: French Open debut ===
Nishikori made his comeback after his injury of the previous year. After receiving a wildcard at Delray Beach, he was beaten in the first round by Benjamin Becker. Kei returned to the Challenger tour later in April with great success, reaching quarterfinals at both Baton Rouge and Tallahassee events, followed by a victory at the Savannah Challenger over Ryan Sweeting in the final. On 15 May 2010, he won the Sarasota open by defeating Brian Dabul, in three sets.

Nishikori played in his first French Open. He rebounded from two sets down to defeat Santiago Giraldo of Colombia in the first round but he lost his second match against Novak Djokovic. He lost to Richard Gasquet in the first round of the 2010 Aegon Championships. At Wimbledon, he played second seed Rafael Nadal in the first round and lost in straight sets.

At the US Open, the Japanese No. 1 met Marin Čilić in the second round. Nishikori ousted the 11th seed in five sets to advance to the third round, his best Grand Slam tournament showing in 2010.

=== 2011: First Masters semifinal, win over World No. 1, Top 25 ===
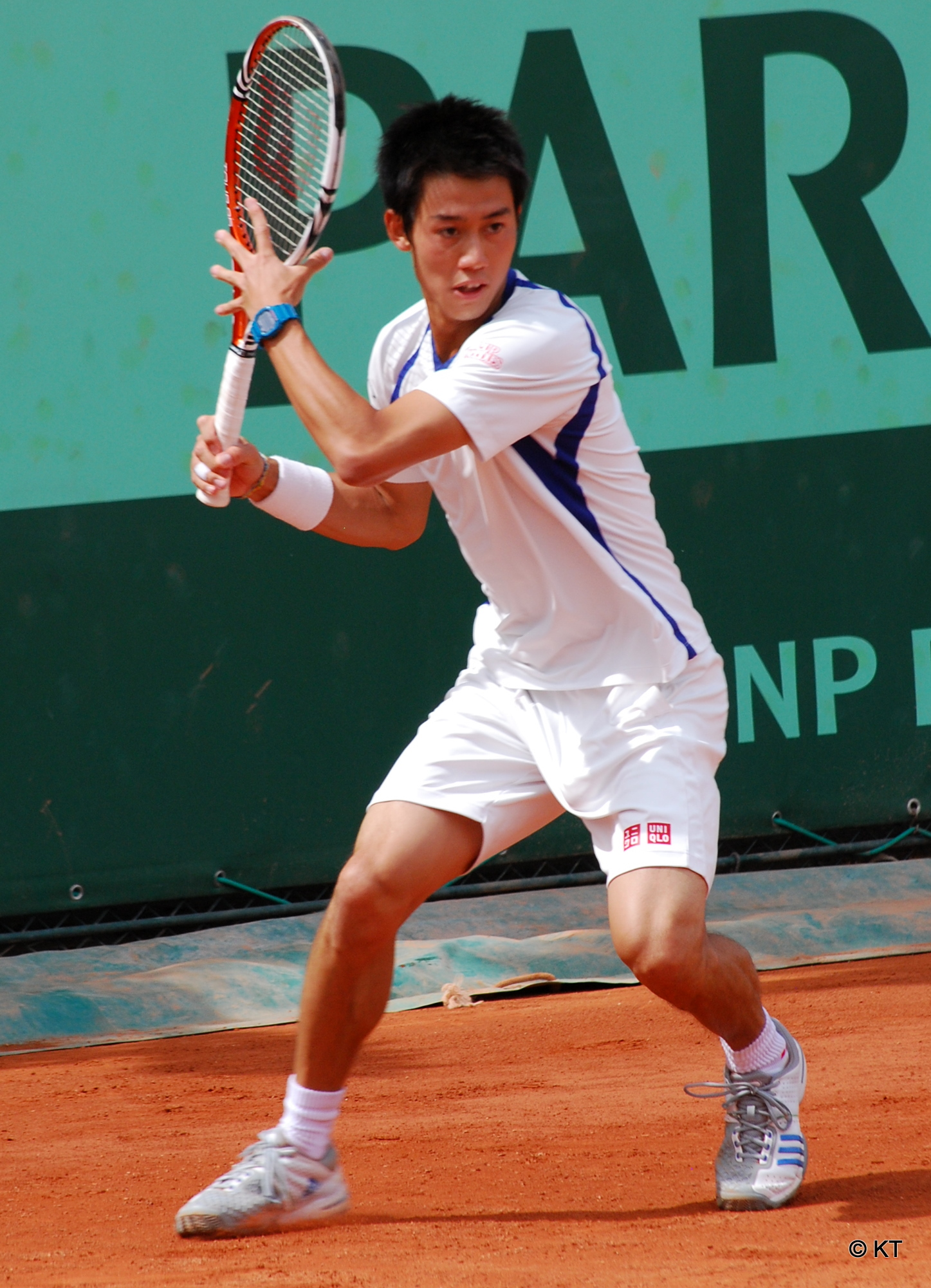
Nishikori at the 2011 French Open.

Nishikori opened the season in Chennai, where he upset two-time defending champion Marin Čilić in the first round, before falling in the quarterfinals to Janko Tipsarević.

In the 2011 Australian Open, Nishikori reached the third round, defeating Fabio Fognini and Florian Mayer along the way. His run was ended in the third round by ninth seed Fernando Verdasco. After the third-round appearance in Melbourne, his ranking rose to No. 70.

At the first two ATP Masters Series events of the year, Nishikori suffered a first-round loss at Indian Wells and a second-round loss in Miami. Nishikori then reached his second final at the 2011 U.S. Men's Clay Court Championships. He was defeated by American wildcard Ryan Sweeting.

At Roland Garros, Nishikori lost in the second round to Sergiy Stakhovsky. He faced Lleyton Hewitt in the first round at Wimbledon, but lost in four sets. Nishikori then retired in his first-round match against Flavio Cipolla at the US Open.

At the Shanghai Masters, Nishikori reached his first Masters 1000 semifinal. He defeated Robin Haase, fourth seed Jo-Wilfried Tsonga, and Santiago Giraldo, in the first three rounds. In the quarterfinals, Nishikori upset 12th-seeded Alexandr Dolgopolov in straight sets. He lost to No. 2 Andy Murray in his first Masters 1000 semifinal. He reached a career-high of world No. 30, breaking the previous Japanese mark of No. 46, set by Shuzo Matsuoka in July 1992.

In the 2011 Swiss Indoors Basel tournament, Nishikori defeated an ailing world No. 1 Novak Djokovic to reach the final, coming back from a 4–5, 0–30 deficit in the second set. The win was only Djokovic's fourth loss of the season, second loss in a completed match, and first loss of a completed match on a non-clay surface. Nishikori was defeated in the final by Roger Federer. On the heels of the victory, Nishikori was granted special exemption into the 2011 BNP Paribas Masters in Paris, and achieved a ranking of world No. 24.

=== 2012: First Grand Slam quarterfinal and second ATP title ===
Nishikori started the season at the Brisbane International, where he lost in the second round to Marcos Baghdatis. At the 2012 Australian Open, Nishikori came back from a set down to defeat sixth seed Jo-Wilfried Tsonga to reach the quarterfinals of the Australian Open, where he was then defeated by fourth seed Andy Murray. Nishikori was the first Japanese male player to reach the quarterfinals of the Australian Open in 80 years.

Nishikori made it to the quarterfinals of the Hall of Fame Tennis Championships after beating Belgian Olivier Rochus in three sets.

In the Summer Olympics, Nishikori lost to Argentina's Juan Martín del Potro in the quarterfinals. He and Go Soeda lost in the first round of the men's doubles.

In Toronto, he lost his first match (after a first-round bye) to Sam Querrey. He did better in Cincinnati, making it to the third round before being defeated by Stan Wawrinka, who ended up a semifinalist in the event. Nishikori had also lost to Wawrinka in the quarterfinals in Buenos Aires in February.

On 7 October, eighth seed Nishikori won the Rakuten Japan Open in Tokyo against sixth seed Milos Raonic of Canada in three sets to win his first ATP 500 series title and second career ATP Tour title, lifting his world ranking from world No. 17 to a career-high of world No. 15. Nishikori's win was historic as he became the first Japanese man to win the Japan Open in its 41-year history.

=== 2013: Third ATP title ===
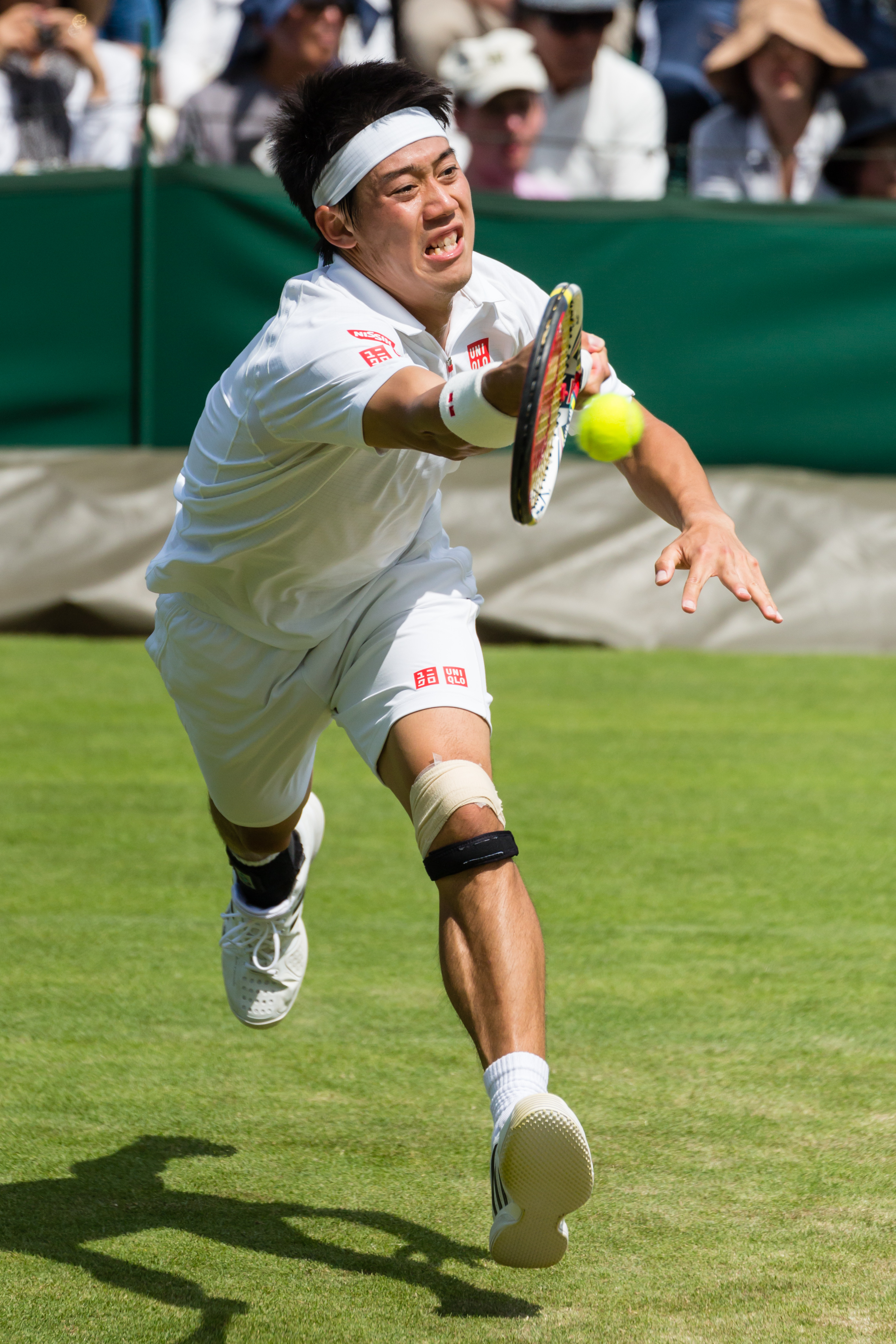
Nishikori at the 2013 Wimbledon Championships.

Nishikori started the year by playing the Brisbane International and reached the semifinals before retiring to Andy Murray because of a knee injury. Nishikori then reached the fourth round of the Australian Open before falling to fourth-seeded David Ferrer. Nishikori was bothered by a nagging knee injury throughout the match. Nishikori then won his third career title in the U.S. National Indoor Championships by defeating Feliciano López in straight sets. Seeded fifth, Nishikori finished the tournament without dropping a set in taking the winner's check, and moved up six ranking spots from No. 22 in the ATP rankings to No. 16.

On 9 May, Nishikori defeated defending champion Roger Federer at the Madrid Open in the third round, but lost to Pablo Andújar in the quarters.

In the first round of the 2013 US Open, Nishikori lost to a lower-ranked opponent, this time to world No. 179 Dan Evans in straight sets.

=== 2014: Career breakthrough, US Open final ===
Michael Chang became Kei Nishikori's coach in 2014.

Nishikori made it to the fourth round in the Australian Open, but was dismissed by Rafael Nadal in straight sets. He defended his title at the U.S. National Indoor Tennis Championships in Memphis, defeating Ivo Karlović in the final. He then played at the Masters 1000 event in Miami, where he was seeded 20th. Nishikori saved four match points before defeating 4th seed David Ferrer and advanced to the semifinals with a three-set win against 5th seed Roger Federer. Because of a left groin injury, he gave 2nd seed Novak Djokovic a walkover in the semifinals. He withdrew from Japan's Davis Cup quarterfinal against the Czech Republic. Nishikori returned to action at the end of April, in Barcelona, winning the final against Santiago Giraldo of Colombia in two sets.

On 10 May, Nishikori made history by reaching the final of Madrid Open, his first Masters 1000 tournament final. Nishikori beat David Ferrer in three sets in the semifinal, and faced world No. 1 and defending champion Rafael Nadal in the final. Nishikori won the first set and led by a break in the second, but Nishikori sustained a back injury while leading 4–2 and was forced to retire at 3–0 in the third set having lost seven games in a row. The result saw him achieve a career-high #9 in ATP singles ranking. Nishikori lost in the first round of the French Open to Martin Kližan in three sets.

Nishikori bounced back from the French Open first round loss in the grass court season by reaching the semifinals of the 2014 Gerry Weber Open before losing to Roger Federer in straight sets. Nishikori participated in the Wimbledon Championships and made it to the fourth round after surviving a tight 5-setter against clay-court specialist Simone Bolelli, but eventually lost in the fourth round to Milos Raonic, despite winning the opening set. Nishikori opened his hard-court season by participating in the Citi Open. He reached the quarterfinals only to be beaten by Richard Gasquet for the fifth time in his career in straight sets.

Nishikori reached his first Grand Slam final at the 2014 US Open. He beat Wayne Odesnik, Pablo Andújar, Leonardo Mayer and then world No. 6 Milos Raonic in a marathon five-set match that lasted until 2:26 am, tying the record for late finishes at the US Open en route to the quarterfinals. In the quarterfinals, he scored a rare upset over Australian Open champion Stan Wawrinka, who had thus far dominated their meetings to ensure that he would regain a top ten ranking. He also became the first Japanese man in 81 years to reach the semifinals at a Major since Jiro Sato in 1933 French Championships (now French Open). Nishikori then defeated world No. 1 Novak Djokovic in the semifinals to become the first Asian man ever to reach a Grand Slam tournament final. (As reference, an American male tennis player of Asian descent Michael Chang reached the final of Grand Slam to win French Open at the youngest age of Grand Slam history, and the finalist to be Runner up in both US Open and Australian Open.) In the final, Nishikori lost to Marin Čilić. Nishikori's run at the US Open saw his singles ranking improve to world No.8.

Nishikori began the Asian Swing by entering the Malaysian Open as first seed and won for a third season title, beating Julien Benneteau in two sets. Nishikori then went on to participate in the Rakuten Japan Open and won the title for the second time defeating Milos Raonic in the final. However, in the Shanghai Rolex Masters, he later suffered a first round loss to Jack Sock in straight sets. Nishikori then played in the BNP Paribas Masters and reached the semifinals, defeating Tommy Robredo, Jo-Wilfried Tsonga and David Ferrer, each in three sets. However, he was ousted by Novak Djokovic in straight sets. This semifinal appearance guaranteed his berth for his ATP World Tour Finals debut.

In his first Year-End ATP Finals, Nishikori defeated Andy Murray and David Ferrer, but was defeated by Roger Federer in straight sets. With this result, he progressed through to the semifinals and faced Novak Djokovic, losing in three sets, thus ending the year at a career high world No. 5.

=== 2015: World No. 4, French Open quarterfinal ===
Nishikori began the 2015 season by participating in the 2015 Brisbane International and reached the semifinals before being beaten by Milos Raonic in three tight-set tiebreaks. He reached the 2015 Brisbane International doubles finals with his partner Alexandr Dolgopolov but lost in straight sets. Nishikori equalled his best record yet in the Australian Open by reaching the quarterfinals for the second time in his career, dropping only two sets along the way, but he was beaten in straight sets by defending champion Stan Wawrinka. In February, Nishikori won his eighth singles title and became the first ever player to win the Memphis Open three times in a row, beating Kevin Anderson in straight sets in the final.

He next participated in the 2015 Abierto Mexicano Telcel and reached the final, losing only a set to Kevin Anderson in the semifinals. By reaching the final, he earned enough ATP ranking points to move into a new career high world ranking of No. 4. However, he lost to David Ferrer in straight sets in the final. During the March Masters, he reached the fourth round of the 2015 BNP Paribas Open for the first time in seven appearances but was upset by Feliciano López in straight sets in the fourth round. In the 2015 Miami Open, he defeated Mikhail Youzhny, Viktor Troicki and David Goffin all in straight sets losing only a total of 10 games to reach the quarterfinals. However, he was upset by an in-form John Isner in straight sets.

Nishikori began his clay-court season at the 2015 Barcelona Open Banc Sabadell where he reached the final after beating Teymuraz Gabashvili, Santiago Giraldo, Roberto Bautista Agut and Martin Kližan. He successfully defended his title by beating Pablo Andújar in the final in two sets to win his ninth career title on the tour. At the 2015 Mutua Madrid Open, Nishikori was granted a first-round bye and proceeded by defeating David Goffin in three tough-sets in the second round. He reached the semifinals after beating Roberto Bautista Agut and David Ferrer in straight sets respectively. He then lost to Andy Murray in the semifinals, and his ranking dropped to sixth as a result of failing to defend his points from the final in 2014.

Nishikori was given a tough draw at the 2015 Italian Open but managed to reach the quarterfinal after beating Jiří Veselý and Viktor Troicki, both in straight sets. He faced world No. 1 Novak Djokovic in the QF and lost in three sets. Nishikori opened his French Open campaign by defeating both Paul-Henri Mathieu and Thomaz Bellucci in straight sets to advance to the third round. He advanced to the 4R for the second time in his career after his third round opponent, Benjamin Becker, withdrew due to a right shoulder injury. Nishikori became the first Japanese man to reach the quarterfinals of the French Open in 82 years by beating Teymuraz Gabashvili. He then played home favorite Jo-Wilfried Tsonga, but eventually lost in five set.

Nishikori opened his grass-court season by participating in the Halle Open where he reached the semifinals, only to retire in his match against Andreas Seppi down 1–4 in the first set due to his calf injury which he attained in his quarterfinal match. Nishikori decided to play Wimbledon, and he reached the second round by beating Simone Bolelli in five sets for the second straight year but then withdrew from his second round match against Santiago Giraldo, due to his calf injury acting on him again during his first round match.

Nishikori opened his hard-court season by competing at the 2015 Citi Open defeating James Duckworth, Leonardo Mayer, Sam Groth, and Marin Čilić en route to the final where he beat John Isner in three tight sets to capture his third title of the year and 10th title overall. At the 2015 Rogers Cup, he reached the semifinals without losing a set and defeated Rafael Nadal for the first time in eight tries in the quarterfinals. He lost to Andy Murray in the semifinals in straight sets. He withdrew from the Cincinnati Masters citing fatigue and hip injury, which affected his semifinal match against Murray the previous week. He lost in the first round of the 2015 US Open to Benoît Paire.

Nishikori started the Asian Fall by participating in his hometown tournament, Rakuten Japan Open, where he reached the semifinals, including victories over Borna Ćorić, Sam Querrey and Marin Čilić. He was upset in his semifinal match by unseeded Benoît Paire. He reached third rounds of the Shanghai Rolex Masters before losing to Kevin Anderson. He then played in the BNP Paribas Masters. However, he retired in the third round match against Richard Gasquet due to an abdominal injury.

Nishikori qualified for the ATP World Tour Finals for the second straight year in a row, clinching eighth place. He defeated Tomáš Berdych, but lost to Novak Djokovic and Roger Federer. He failed to qualify for the semifinals, finishing in third place in his group.

=== 2016: Olympic bronze medal ===
Nishikori began the season ranked No. 8. In January, he entered the Brisbane International as the No. 2 seed where he advanced to the quarterfinals with a bye and a straight sets win over Mikhail Kukushkin, but was eventually upset by seventh seed Bernard Tomic in three sets. At the Australian Open, Nishikori was seeded seventh. He began with victories over Philipp Kohlschreiber, Austin Krajicek and Guillermo García López before beating ninth-seeded Jo-Wilfried Tsonga to reach his third Australian Open quarterfinal, where he lost to Novak Djokovic. Nishikori next competed at the Memphis Open where he was seeded first and was the three-time defending champion. Nishikori received a bye into the second round and advanced to the semifinals without dropping a set. In the semifinals, Nishikori beat Sam Querrey in three sets and later beat young American Taylor Fritz in straight sets to win his fourth straight Memphis title and his 11th ATP title overall. He joined Jimmy Connors as the only four-time winners of the event.

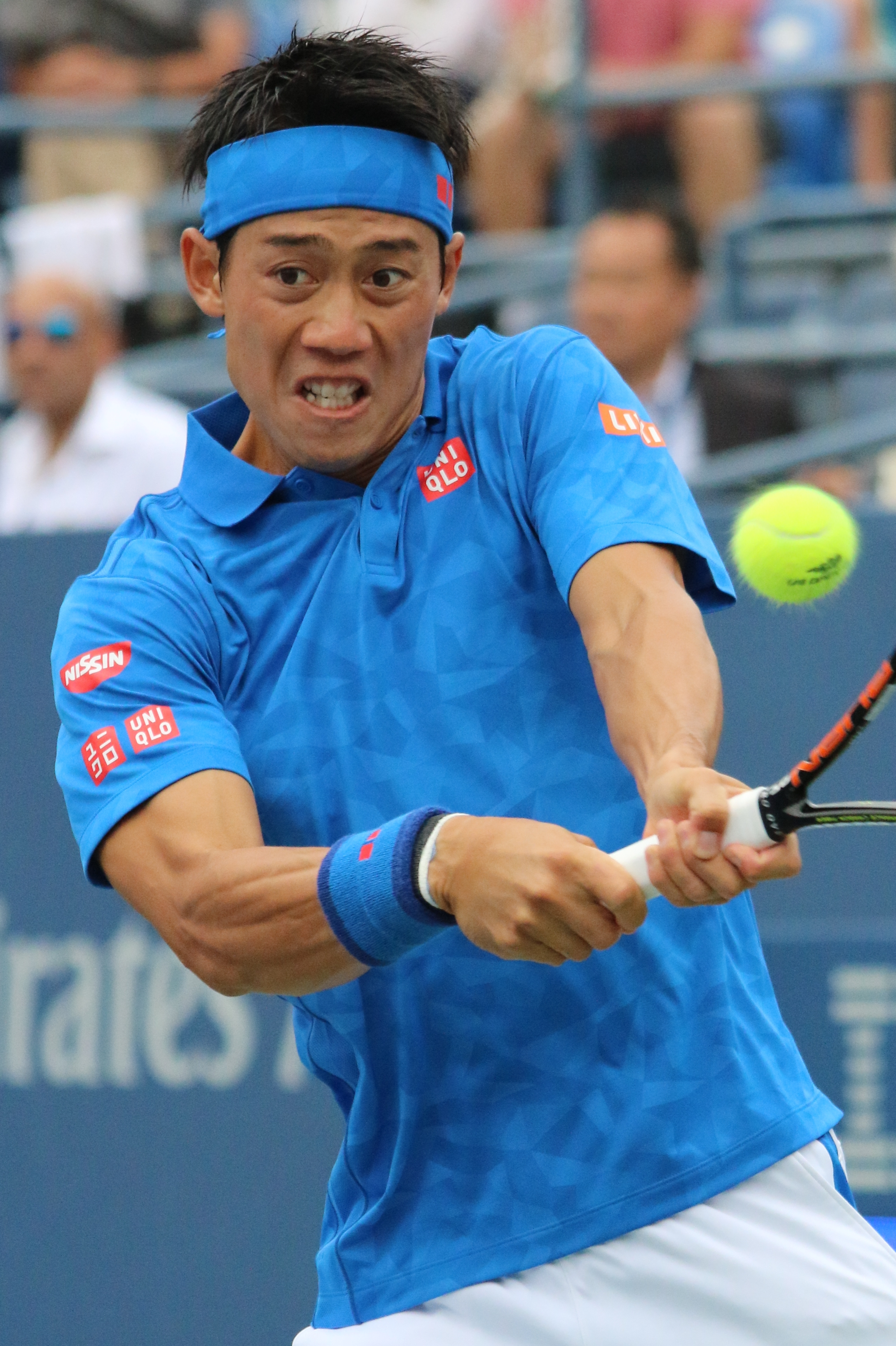
Nishikori at the 2016 US Open

During the March Masters, Nishikori reached the quarterfinals in the Indian Wells Masters for the first time in his career after defeating Mikhail Kukushkin, Steve Johnson in straight sets and saving a match point against ninth seed John Isner in Nishikori's serve in the third set. He lost to fourth seed Rafael Nadal in straight sets. Nishikori improved his feat by reaching the quarterfinal again in the Miami Open by beating Pierre-Hugues Herbert, Alexandr Dolgopolov and Roberto Bautista Agut in straight sets. He then reached the semifinals of the tournament for the second time in his career after saving five match points and beating Gaël Monfils in a comeback three-set match. He then reached his second final in a Masters 1000 after dismantling Nick Kyrgios in straight sets. He lost to then world No. 1 Novak Djokovic in the final in straight sets.

For the fifth consecutive year, Nishikori did not play in Monte Carlo and instead turned his focus to defending his Barcelona Open Banc Sabadell title. He reached the final without losing a set, but lost in straight sets to resurgent nine-time champion Rafael Nadal in the final. He followed his good run by reaching the semifinals in the Mutua Madrid Open, beating Fabio Fognini, Richard Gasquet for the first time in seven meetings and rising teenage star Nick Kyrgios. He lost in the semifinal to Novak Djokovic in straight sets despite a close second set. Nishikori then replicated his Madrid run by reaching the semifinals of the Italian Open for the first time after beating Viktor Troicki in the opener in three sets, followed by wins over Richard Gasquet and Dominic Thiem in straight sets. He lost in the semifinal against world Novak Djokovic in a marathon three hours three-setter despite winning the first set 6–2 and managed to pull off a tiebreak in the third set. He later participated at the French Open but lost to an in-form Gasquet in the fourth round in four sets. Nishikori began his grass season at the Halle Open, but retired in the second round due to a hip injury. His next tournament was at Wimbledon, where he retired in the fourth round against Marin Čilić, once again due to injury.

With Murray, Federer and Nadal absent, Nishikori was seeded third for the Rogers Cup Masters in Toronto. After beating Grigor Dimitrov and Stan Wawrinka in the quarterfinals and semifinals respectively, Nishikori then lost to Djokovic in straight sets in the finals, going 0–5 so far in the season against the Serb. Nishikori then participated in the 2016 Summer Olympics, where he reached the semis before being defeated by World No. 2 Andy Murray in straight sets. However, he later acquired the bronze medal after he defeated Rafael Nadal 6–2, 6–7 (1), 6–3, becoming the first Japanese man to win an Olympic tennis medal since Ichiya Kumagae in the 1920 Summer Olympics.

Nishikori nearly replicated his 2014 US Open run by reaching the semifinals of the US Open, defeating Benjamin Becker, Karen Khachanov and Nicolas Mahut respectively in four sets, followed by a straight sets fourth-round win against Ivo Karlović, and a five-set victory over world No. 2 Andy Murray in the quarterfinals that lasted nearly four hours; this was arguably his biggest victory since the 2014 US Open. After leading by a set and a break against eventual champion Stan Wawrinka in the semifinals, a clearly fatigued Nishikori lost in four sets, hence ending his U.S. hardcourt season with a finals and semifinals run in the Canadian Open and the US Open respectively.

After an indifferent Asian swing season where he retired in his home tournament, the Rakuten Japan Open, Nishikori returned to action again in Basel, where he was the No. 3 seed. He enjoyed a successful tournament there, but lost to Marin Čilić in the finals.

Nishikori next represented Japan in the Davis Cup Play-Off against Ukraine and played in the doubles rubber alongside Yūichi Sugita, winning the match in straight sets, giving Japan an unassailable 3–0 lead to promote his country back into the 2017 Davis Cup World Group.

Nishikori made his third successive appearance at the year-end championships after becoming the fifth player to qualify for the 2016 ATP World Tour Finals. He won his first match, upsetting third seed, Stan Wawrinka in straight sets 6–2, 6–3 before losing his other two round-robin matches to Andy Murray and Marin Čilić respectively, both in three sets. Having done enough to nevertheless make the semifinals however, he was then defeated by a resurgent Novak Djokovic in straight sets, ending his season with a singles ranking of world No. 5 for both the second time in his career and in the past three years as well.

=== 2017: Wrist injury and out of the top 20 ===
Nishikori began the year by reaching the finals of Brisbane, beating Wawrinka along the way, before falling to champion Grigor Dimitrov. In the Australian Open, after defeating Andrey Kuznetsov in five sets in the first round, Kei beat his next two opponents in straight sets. His run ended in another five-set match to eventual champion Roger Federer.

Nishikori withdrew from the US Open in Cincinnati with a right wrist problem and subsequent scans revealed a tear in one of the tendons. Soon after that, he announced that he would miss the rest of the season. As a result of his extended absence, following the conclusion of Paris he fell to World No.22, his lowest ranking since January 2012 and his first time out of the top 20 in the rankings since March 2014.

=== 2018: Return from injury & back to top 10 ===
Nishikori returned after a 5-month injury layoff and started his 2018 season by playing at the American challenger tour events. In Newport Beach he lost in the first round against American qualifier Dennis Novikov. In the following week, Novikov and Nishikori met again in the first round. This time, Nishikori won in straight sets. Kei Nishikori went on to win his next four matches en route to win his sixth ATP Challenger career titles in Dallas, by defeating Mackenzie McDonald in the final.

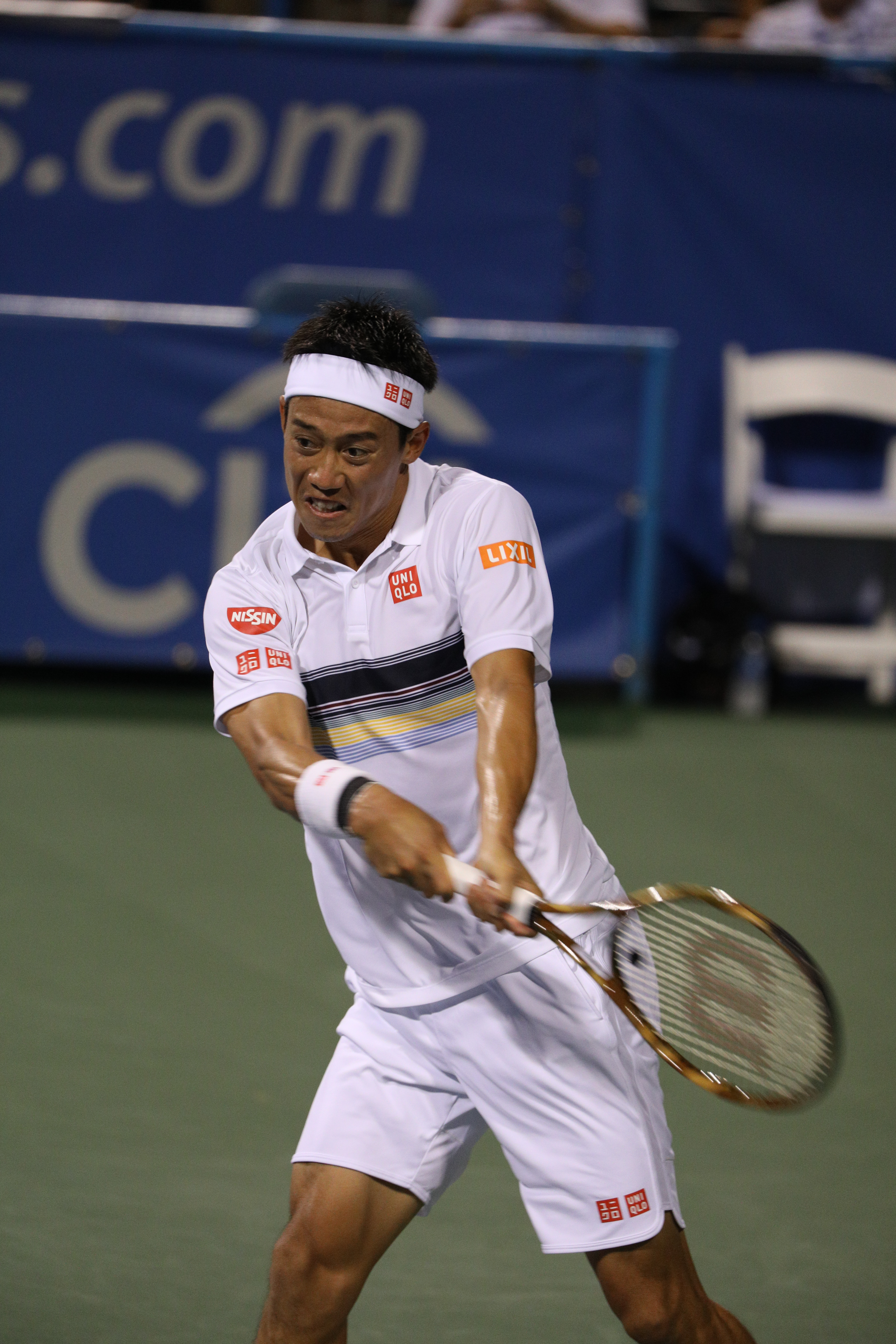
Kei Nishikori at the 2018 Citi Open

Nishikori made his return to the ATP Tour competition (since August 2017 Montreal) at the inaugural ATP 250 Tournament in New York. Nishikori made a back-to-back winning return in New York by defeating Noah Rubin and Evgeny Donskoy in the first and second round respectively. He defeated Radu Albot in the quarterfinals in three sets, before losing to Kevin Anderson in the semifinal. Kei Nishikori was unseeded at the 2018 Abierto Mexicano Telcel in Acapulco and lost against Denis Shapovalov in the first round.

In a bid to regain match fitness, Nishikori entered the Monte-Carlo Masters for the first time since 2012, having never progressed past the third round at the tournament before. Unseeded for the tournament, he beat Tomáš Berdych, Daniil Medvedev, Andreas Seppi, Marin Čilić, and Alexander Zverev to reach his 4th career Masters 1000 finals, before losing to Rafael Nadal in straight sets in the finals. He thus became the active player with the most Masters 1000 finals without a title. At the 2018 Italian Open, he advanced past Feliciano López, third seed Grigor Dimitrov, and Philipp Kohlschreiber before losing to Novak Djokovic in the quarterfinals in three sets. At the 2018 French Open, Nishikori was seeded 19th. He defeated Maxime Janvier, Benoît Paire, and Gilles Simon before falling to seventh seed Dominic Thiem in the fourth round.

In the lead up to Wimbledon, Nishikori lost to Karen Khachanov in the 2nd round at the Halle Open. Entering Wimbledon with continued injury woes, expectations were low for Nishikori to make a deep run. He beat Christian Harrison and Bernard Tomic before upsetting Nick Kyrgios in the 3rd round. In the 4th round, despite facing some elbow pain, Nishikori came from a set down to beat Ernests Gulbis, reaching the quarterfinals of Wimbledon for the first time. Thus, Nishikori had succeeded in reaching the quarterfinals of every grand slam event. In the quarterfinals, he lost to eventual champion Novak Djokovic in four sets.

At the US Open, Nishikori was seeded 21st. He defeated Maximilian Marterer in straight sets in the first round, facing Gaël Monfils in the second. Monfils was forced to retire in the second set after sustaining a wrist injury during the match. Nishikori then defeated 13th seed Diego Schwartzman and Philipp Kohlschreiber to reach his third quarterfinal at the US Open. There, he faced Marin Čilić in a rematch of the 2014 final. He dropped the first set 2–6, but pulled out a close five-set victory, breaking Čilić in the final game of the fifth set to win 6–4. He advanced to the semifinals, losing to Novak Djokovic in straight sets, 6–3, 6–4, 6–2.

Nishikori was the top seed at the Moselle Open. He defeated Peter Gojowczyk and Nikoloz Basilashvili before being upset by qualifier Matthias Bachinger in the semifinals in three sets. He then participated in the Japan Open seeded third, defeating compatriot Yūichi Sugita in the first round, Benoît Paire in the second, fifth seed Stefanos Tsitsipas in the quarterfinals, and eighth seed Richard Gasquet in the semifinals. In the final, he was upset by unseeded Daniil Medvedev.

At the Shanghai Masters, Nishikori was seeded eighth, defeating Wu Yibing and Sam Querrey to reach the quarterfinals, where he was defeated by top seed and defending champion Roger Federer. At the Vienna Open, Nishikori was seeded fifth. He defeated Frances Tiafoe, Karen Khachanov, top seed Dominic Thiem, and Mikhail Kukushkin to reach his third final of the year, where he was defeated by second seed Kevin Anderson.

At the Paris Masters, Nishikori was seeded tenth. He defeated Adrian Mannarino before facing Kevin Anderson in the third round, this time defeating him in straight sets. He was then defeated by third seed Roger Federer in the quarterfinals. However, by reaching this stage of the tournament, he accrued enough points to secure a spot in the ATP Finals.

At the ATP Finals, Nishikori was seeded seventh. He was drawn in Group Lleyton Hewitt and faced second seed Roger Federer in his first match, defeating him in straight sets. This was Nishikori's first victory over Federer since 2014 and ended a six-match losing streak against him. He was eliminated in the group stage after losing his next two matches against Kevin Anderson and Dominic Thiem. He ended the season ranked World No. 9.

=== 2019: First title since 2016 ===
Nishikori started his 2019 season at the Brisbane International, where he was seeded second. He defeated Denis Kudla, sixth seed Grigor Dimitrov, and Jérémy Chardy to reach the final, where he defeated fourth seed Daniil Medvedev in three sets to win the title. This was his first tournament victory since February 2016 and broke his streak of nine consecutive final losses.

At the Australian Open, Nishikori was seeded eighth. In the first round, he faced qualifier Kamil Majchrzak, who was making his Grand Slam main draw debut. Majchrzak took the first two sets in just 90 minutes, before suffering from cramps. Nishikori won 15 of the next 17 games, before Majchrzak retired down 3 games to none in the fifth set. In the second round, he faced Ivo Karlović, against whom he took the first two sets before dropping the third and fourth. The fifth set proceeded to a tiebreak, which Nishikori won 10–7. In the fourth round, he faced 23rd seed Pablo Carreño Busta. He dropped the first two sets before staging a major comeback, winning the third and fourth and leading by a break in the fifth before failing to serve out the match. Nishikori narrowly forced a tiebreak, trailing until a crucial point at 8–5, in which Busta contested an incorrect late call. The umpire awarded the point to Nishikori, who proceeded to win the tiebreak 10–8. He thus advanced to his fourth Australian Open quarterfinal, where he retired in the second set against Novak Djokovic.

At Rotterdam, Nishikori was the top seed. He defeated Pierre-Hugues Herbert, Ernests Gulbis and Márton Fucsovics before he lost in the semifinals to Stan Wawrinka. At Dubai, he entered as first seed, defeating Benoît Paire in the first round before being upset by Hubert Hurkacz. At Indian Wells, he was the sixth seed in the singles draw, defeating Adrian Mannarino before losing again to Hubert Hurkacz. He also entered the doubles draw, teaming with Máximo González. They lost to Raven Klaasen and Michael Venus in the first round. At the Miami Open, seeded fifth, he lost his first match to Dušan Lajović.

At the Monte-Carlo Masters, Nishikori was defending an appearance in the final, but lost to Pierre-Hugues Herbert in the second round. At Barcelona, he entered seeded fourth, defeating Taylor Fritz, Félix Auger-Aliassime and Roberto Carballés Baena, being defeated by Daniil Medvedev in the semifinals. At the Madrid Masters, he was seeded sixth. He defeated Hugo Dellien before losing to Stan Wawrinka in the third round. At Rome, he entered as sixth seed, defeating Taylor Fritz and Jan-Lennard Struff before losing to Diego Schwartzman in the quarterfinals.

At the French Open, Nishikori was the seventh seed. He defeated Quentin Halys and Jo-Wilfried Tsonga before defeating Laslo Djere and Benoît Paire in tight five-set matches in the third and fourth rounds, respectively. In the quarterfinals, he was defeated in straight sets by defending champion Rafael Nadal, who went on to defend his title.

At Wimbledon, Nishikori was seeded eighth. He reached the fourth round without dropping a set, defeating Thiago Monteiro, Cameron Norrie, and Steve Johnson. He dropped a set against Mikhail Kukushkin in the fourth round, but won the match in four, reaching the quarterfinals at Wimbledon for the second consecutive year. He was defeated in four sets by Roger Federer.

He reached the third round at the 2019 US Open.

=== 2020-2022: Olympics, first top 10 win in 3 years, ATP 500 semifinal ===
He returned to the Major level, a year later in September 2020, following the COVID season break at the 2020 French Open where he won his first round match.

Nishikori started his 2021 season playing in the 2021 ATP Cup, losing both of his singles matches to Daniil Medvedev and Diego Schwartzman. At the Australian Open, Nishikori lost in the first round to Pablo Carreño Busta in straight sets.

Nishikori made his first quarterfinal since Wimbledon 2019 in 2021 Rotterdam, after beating 7th seed Félix Auger-Aliassime and Alex de Minaur. He lost to Borna Ćorić in two tiebreak sets. He also made the quarterfinals in 2021 Dubai, beating Reilly Opelka, 5th seed David Goffin and Aljaž Bedene. He lost to eventual finalist Lloyd Harris in three sets. Nishikori was seeded at an event for the first time since the 2019 US Open in Miami. Seeded 28th, he once again beat Bedene, but lost in the third round in three sets to Stefanos Tsitsipas.

Nishikori's clay-court swing also showed progress of his return. His first tournament was 2021 Barcelona, where after beating Guido Pella and 13th seed Cristian Garín, he took a set off Rafael Nadal before losing in the third round in three sets. Nishikori reached the second round in Madrid, and the third round in Rome, losing both matches to Alexander Zverev. He recorded his best Grand Slam result in over a year at the French Open, beating Alessandro Giannessi and 23rd seed Karen Khachanov in five sets. After his third round opponent, Henri Laaksonen retired, he progressed to the fourth round, losing once again to Zverev.

His 2021 grass court swing was much more quiet, losing in Halle to Sebastian Korda and in Wimbledon to Jordan Thompson.

At the 2020 Tokyo Olympics, Nishikori recorded his first top 10 win since 2018 by beating Andrey Rublev in straight sets in the first round. He also beat Marcos Giron and Ilya Ivashka to reach the quarterfinals, where he lost in straight sets to Novak Djokovic.

Nishikori then participated in 2021 Citi Open in Washington, where he beat Sam Querrey and 9th seed Alexander Bublik in straight sets. He then beat Cameron Norrie to reach the quarterfinals. There, he beat Lloyd Harris in straight sets to advance to the semifinals. He lost to Mackenzie McDonald in three sets. He reached the third round at the 2021 US Open. In October, he played his last event of the season at the 2021 BNP Paribas Open where he lost in the second round.

On January 25, 2022, Kei Nishikori announced that he will be undergoing arthroscopic surgery on his left hip and will be aiming to come back on tour in about six months.

=== 2023-2024: First Masters quarterfinal in 5 & ATP final in 6 years ===
Nishikori announced he was aiming to be able to return for the 2023 Australian Open, stating that he has a 'strong desire' to return. However, two weeks before the start of the tournament he announced he is still struggling with an ongoing foot injury and delayed his return to an undisclosed date.

In April 2023, after one and a half year of absence, he announced he is planning to make his comeback at a Challenger level in May 2023. In June, after close to two years off the ATP Tour he returned at the Challenger 75 2023 Caribbean Open in Palmas Del Mar, Puerto Rico, and won his first match against American Christian Langmo. He then defeated Mitchell Krueger, Adam Walton, and Gustavo Heide to reach the final, where he defeated another American Michael Zheng to win the title. He became the only player ever to win an ATP Challenger title while being unranked.

He competed in his first tournament since Indian Wells 2021 at the 2023 Atlanta Open where he reached the quarterfinals defeating Juncheng Shang. He skipped all the ATP Challenger tournaments on home soil in November and December due to a left knee injury.

He received a wildcard for the 2024 Miami Open but lost to Sebastian Ofner. Ranked No. 350, he entered the 2024 French Open using protected ranking and defeated qualifier Gabriel Diallo in five sets, for his first Major win since the US Open in 2021 and first win at Roland Garros the same year.

Ranked No. 576, using protected ranking, he also entered the 2024 National Bank Open and defeated Alex Michelsen and eight seed Stefanos Tsitsipas to reach the round of 16. He then defeated Nuno Borges to reach his first ATP quarterfinal in a year and first Masters quarterfinal in five years since 2019. As a result he moved more than 350 positions back up to world No. 222 on 12 August 2024 and to the top 200 a month later. At his home tournament the 2024 Japan Open Tennis Championships, where he received a wildcard, he reached another quarterfinal defeating Marin Čilić and Jordan Thompson, before losing to sixth seed Holger Rune. He returned to the top 150 two weeks later at world No. 143 on 14 October 2024.

In November 2024, Nishikori won his eighth ATP Challenger title at the HPP Open in Helsinki, Finland, defeating Luca Nardi in the final in three sets. As a result he moved up to world No. 107 in the singles rankings on 11 November 2024.

=== 2025-2026: First Asian player with 450 wins, retirement ===
He reached his first ATP Tour final in six years at the 2025 Hong Kong Open after the retirement of Shang Juncheng and returned to the top 100 in the rankings on 6 January 2025, for the first time since June 2022. He lost the match against Alexandre Müller in three sets. At the 2025 Australian Open, Nishikori scored his first win at the tournament since 2019 with his 29th five-set career win over Thiago Monteiro. With another five setter victory in the books, Nishikori record for the second highest winning percentage among active men’s players (after Djokovic) improved to 29-8.

In February 2025, Nishikori recorded his 300th hardcourt career win to clinch the 2025 Davis Cup Qualifiers first-round tie for Japan. Nishikori became only the 26th man in the entire Open Era to achieve the feat and only the second man born in 1989 or later, after Grigor Dimitrov.

At the 2025 Mutua Madrid Open Nishikori recorded his 450th career win over Aleksandar Vukic, joining as the eight player the list of active players with 450+ wins and becoming the first Asian player to achieve the feat.

In April 2026, Kei Nishikori announced that the 2026 season would be his last. He retired after losing to Frances Tiafoe in the first round of the 2026 Japan Open.

== National representation ==
=== Davis Cup ===
Nishikori made his Davis Cup debut for Japan in April 2008 in the Asia/Oceania Zone Group I semifinal against India in New Delhi. He was 18 years and 104 days old, the youngest player to play for Japan. He played the singles rubber on the first day, but lost to Rohan Bopanna in five sets. He then defeated Mahesh Bhupathi in a dead rubber to record his first Davis Cup match win. To date, Nishikori has compiled a 19–3 win–loss record overall (17–3 in singles and 2–0 in doubles).

In the 2014 Davis Cup World Group first round in Tokyo, Japan defeated Canada 4–1, and Nishikori had a hand in three Japan victories in the tie. He beat Peter Polansky and Frank Dancevic in the singles rubbers, and teamed up with Yasutaka Uchiyama for a victory in doubles over Dancevic and Daniel Nestor. Japan advanced to the quarterfinals in the World Group for the first time, but Nishikori missed the quarterfinal against Czech Republic due to a left groin injury.

=== Olympics ===
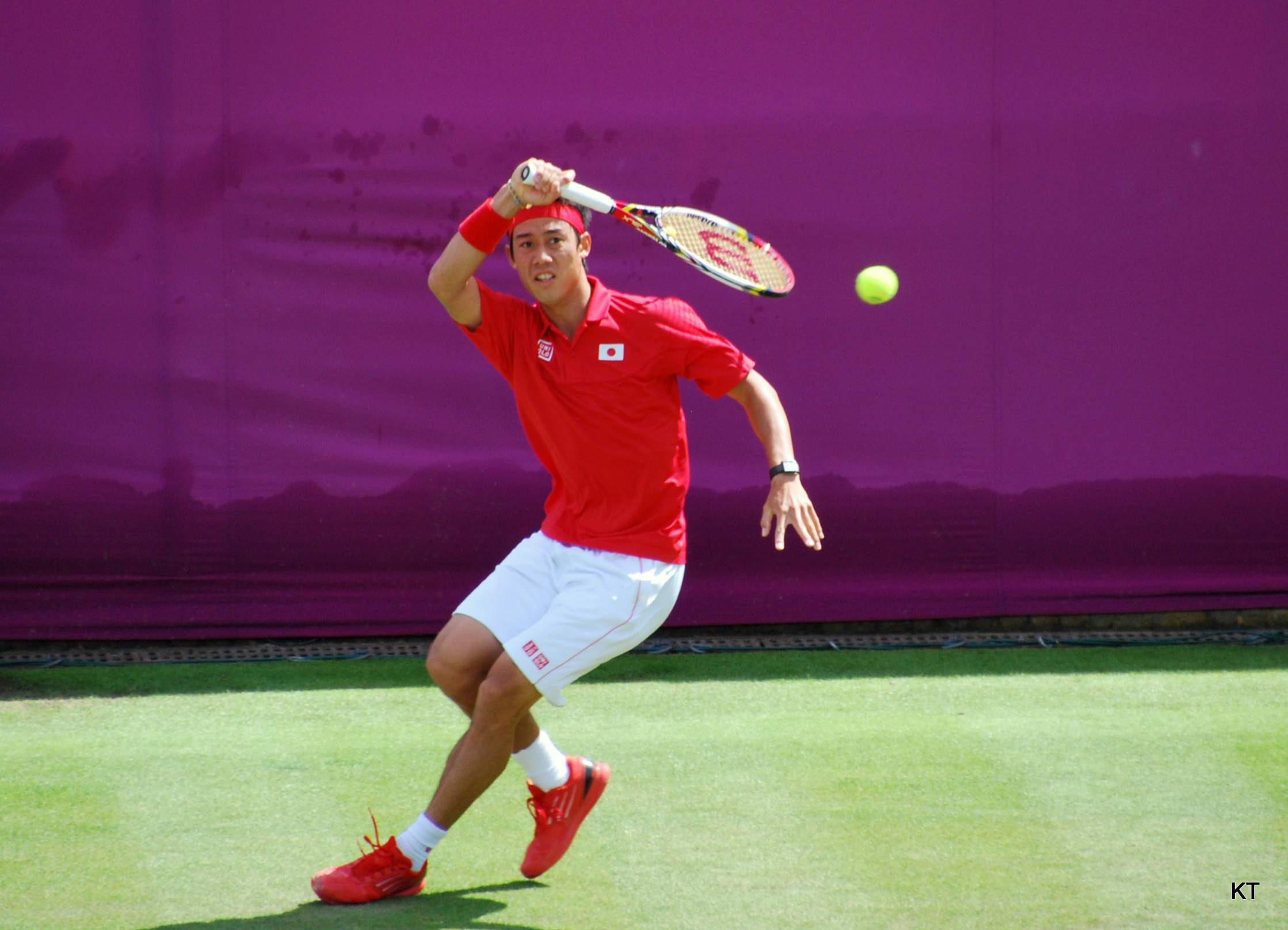
Nishikori at the 2012 Summer Olympics.

Nishikori represented Japan at his maiden Olympics in Beijing 2008. He lost in the first round to Rainer Schüttler of Germany in three sets.

At the London 2012 Olympics, Nishikori competed in the singles and doubles competitions, partnering Go Soeda. In the singles, as the 15th seed, he reached the quarterfinals, knocking out Bernard Tomic, Nikolay Davydenko, and fourth seed David Ferrer on the way. He became the first Japanese man to reach the quarterfinals since Takeichi Harada in the 1924 Paris Olympics. However, his run was ended by eighth seed Juan Martín del Potro of Argentina. In doubles, Nishikori and Soeda were eliminated in the first round by Switzerland's defending champions Roger Federer and Stan Wawrinka.

Fresh from his Rogers Cup finals appearance in Toronto, Nishikori represented Japan at the Rio 2016 Olympics, where he was seeded fourth. In the semifinals, he lost to Andy Murray and faced Rafael Nadal for the bronze medal match, which he won in three sets; it was the first Olympic tennis medal for Japan in 96 years.

== Rivalries ==
=== Nishikori vs. Wawrinka ===
Nishikori and Wawrinka have met eleven times, with Nishikori trailing 4–7. Wawrinka won both of their first two meetings in 2012, in the third round of the Cincinnati Masters and in the quarterfinals of Buenos Aires, respectively. Nishikori recorded his first win against Wawrinka in the quarterfinals of the 2014 US Open in a thrilling five-set match; Nishikori later became the finalist of the tournament.

They met in another Grand Slam quarterfinal, this time at the 2015 Australian Open. Wawrinka beat Nishikori in straight sets.

They met three times in 2016. Nishikori won two of those meetings. They both qualified for the 2016 ATP World Tour Finals and were drawn in the same group. Nishikori defeated Wawrinka in their round-robin match.

Wawrinka won their most recent meeting at the 2019 Madrid Open.

=== Nishikori vs. Raonic ===
Nishikori and Raonic have met seven times, with Nishikori leading their head-to-head 5–2. They met once in 2012, four times in 2014, and twice during the 2015 season. At their first meeting in the 2012 Rakuten Japan Open final, Nishikori won in three sets. Their first meeting in 2014 was at the Madrid Masters, with Nishikori winning in two tiebreak sets. At Wimbledon in 2014 in the fourth round, Raonic scored his first win against Nishikori, beating him in four sets to advance to the quarterfinals. They met again in the US Open fourth round, where the match tied the all-time latest finish for a match at the US Open with Nishikori prevailing in five tight sets; the match lasted 4 hours and 19 minutes. They had a rematch of their 2012 final in the Rakuten Japan Open 2014 final, where Nishikori won again in three sets.

In 2015, the duo first met at the Brisbane International, with Raonic prevailing in three tiebreaks. This was followed later on in the same year in the Davis Cup, where Nishikori won in another epic five-setter to keep Japan's hopes for a quarterfinal place alive.

=== Nishikori vs. Ferrer ===
Nishikori and the now-retired David Ferrer met 14 times, with Nishikori leading 10–4. They played for the first time in the 2008 US Open, with Nishikori registering his first win over a top-10 player, beating Ferrer in a five-set thriller as a teenager. From 2011 to 2013, they met four times, with Ferrer winning three times in straight sets and Nishikori winning only once in the 2012 Olympics in three sets. Nishikori turned the tables in their head-to-head play in 2014, winning all four of their encounters. Their first meeting was at the Miami Masters where Nishikori beat Ferrer in three tight sets after saving four match points to progress to the quarterfinals. They next had an epic encounter at the Madrid Open, with Nishikori beating Ferrer in another tight three-setter to progress to the final of a Masters 1000 for the first time in his career. Their next two encounters were in the BNP Paribas Masters and the ATP World Tour Finals, where Nishikori again defeated the Spaniard in three sets.

In 2015, Ferrer had a remarkable start to the season, but was beaten in the Australian Open by Nishikori in a dominant straight-sets victory. However, Ferrer ended his losing streak to Nishikori in the Abierto Mexicano Telcel, where he beat Nishikori in straight sets in the final. In Madrid, in the quarterfinals, Nishikori took revenge and beat him in straight sets.

=== Nishikori vs. Čilić ===
Nishikori and Cilic have met 16 times, with Nishikori leading 10–6. Cilic won their first ATP World Tour meeting in 2008 at Indian Wells, beating Nishikori in straight sets in the first round. In 2010, Nishikori avenged that loss at the US Open, beating Cilic in a tough five-setter lasting almost five hours. In 2011, they met at the Chennai Open where Nishikori beat Cilic in three sets. In 2012, they encountered each other at the US Open where Cilic avenged his past US Open loss to Nishikori by beating him in four sets to progress to the 4R. In 2013, they met at the Memphis Open where Nishikori beat him in straight sets to progress to the SF and he would later go on to win the title.

In 2014, their rivalry was more intense with 3 ATP meetings. They first met in 2014 at the Brisbane International where Nishikori beat him in three sets to book his semifinal spot. They met again at the clay courts of the Barcelona Open where Nishikori dominated Cilic in another straight sets victory where he would later go on to win his first title on clay. Their most significant meeting would be at the 2014 US Open, they met in the finals after Nishikori overpowered world No. 1 Novak Djokovic and Cilic overcame world No. 2 Roger Federer in the semifinals. Their meeting in the final made the 2014 US Open the first Grand Slam where none of Federer, Nadal and Djokovic reached the final since the 2005 Australian Open. However, Nishikori was defeated in straight sets by an in-form Marin Čilić in the final.

In 2015, the pair met in the semifinals of the 2015 Citi Open, with Nishikori coming back from a set down to prevail in three, and gain a place in his 15th career final. They meet again later on in the 2015 Japan Open where Nishikori came back from a set down to defeat Cilic in three tight sets. In 2016, the duo met in the 4th round of the 2016 Wimbledon where Nishikori retired mid-match in the 2nd set after losing the first set due to a rib injury which had disrupted his grass season. They met again in the final of the Swiss Indoors, where Cilic prevailed in straight sets. During the round-robin stage of the Year-End 2016 ATP World Tour Finals, Cilic came from a set down to defeat Nishikori and ultimately prevail. Most recently, Nishikori defeated Cilic in the quarterfinals of the Monte-Carlo Masters by a score of 6–4, 6–7, 6–3.

At the 2018 US Open, Nishikori and Cilic again met in the quarterfinals. In a five set thriller, Nishikori won a spot in the semifinal of the US Open for only the third time (and only the third time advancing past the quarters in any of the four majors).

== Equipment and endorsements ==
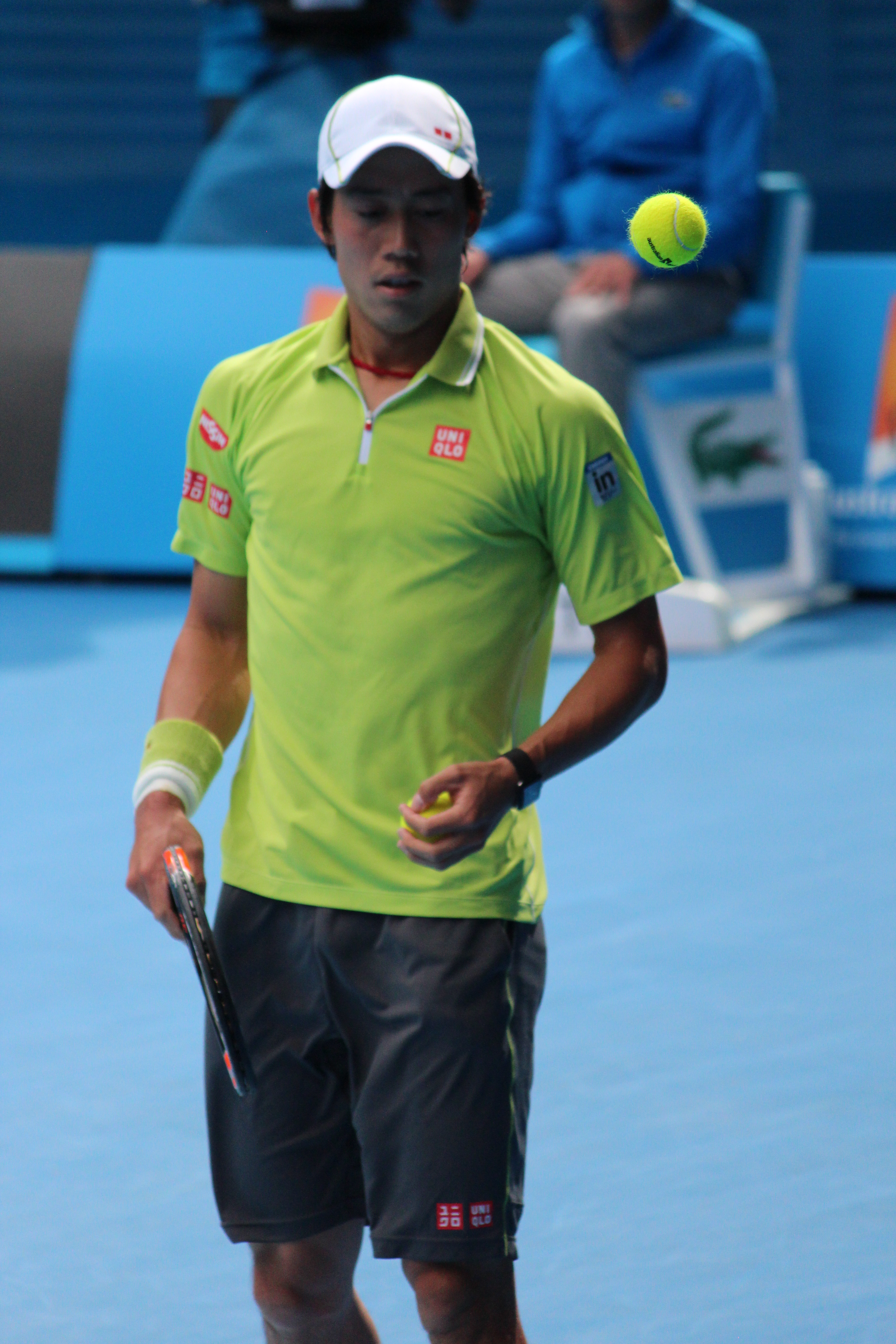
Nishikori at the 2015 Australian Open.

Nishikori has endorsed the Wilson Burn 95; however, it is believed by racquet enthusiasts that he used an older modified Wilson nCode nTour underneath the Steam paint job. In the past, special versions of the Steam racquet have been sold by Wilson, exclusively in Japan, capitalizing on Nishikori's popularity in his home country. Most recently, in 2012 the Steam Pro was available for sale, and was advertised as having the same specifications as Nishikori's actual racquet.

From the 2015 to the 2018 season, Nishikori used the Wilson Burn 95.

As of 2019, after the dismissal of the Burn line, Nishikori currently endorses the Wilson Ultra 95.

He wears Uniqlo clothing and as of the beginning of 2017 red Nike Vapor Tour shoes after having played for almost a decade in Adidas. He also is sponsored by Nissin Foods, TAG Heuer, Fast Retailing, LVMH Moët Hennessy, Japanese financial services firm Jaccs Co., Wowow, mattress topper Air Weave, EA Games, Delta Air Lines and Japan Airlines, in a deal which has his image emblazoned on a Boeing 777-300ER dubbed "JET-KEI". He is often seen wearing a Cup Noodles badge on his sleeve during matches. In 2011, he filmed a commercial for Morinaga & Company's sports drink Weider in Jelly. He also carries around a character called Mr. Saturn from the popular video game Mother / Earthbound.

== Playing style ==
With solid and consistent shots on both wings, Nishikori plays most comfortably at the baseline, using groundstrokes to push his opponents around and occasionally hit winners. Like most players of his type he would be considered a defensive rallying type player who rarely tries to win points quickly or go to the net. He can generate medium pace, especially on his flat backhand, while his Western forehand is accurate and consistent. Because of this, many people have commented that he has the defensive skills of Novak Djokovic. Many critics and fellow players have said that Nishikori's two-handed backhand is one of the best on the tour, on par with that of Djokovic and Murray. Nishikori has a slightly unusual style of hitting groundstrokes on both wings, winding up the racket with a short but compact takeback, and hitting the ball right at its peak. These make his groundstrokes powerful, accurate and unpredictable due to the delayed backswing, which prevents opponents from anticipating which direction the ball will go.

He has also been praised for his return of serves, which he executes well due to his ability to take them quickly. He is known to hit winners off return of serves with strong and accurate groundstrokes.

Standing at 5 ft 10 in, Nishikori's serve is not exceptionally strong. However, it is consistent enough to prevent opponents from easily winning points off it. He has a flat first serve that can reach speeds of up to 120 mph and employs a topspin second serve. Nishikori uses his strong groundstroke game to compromise his weakness with serving.

Nishikori holds the third best percentage of deciding-set wins in tour-level matches in the Open Era at 72.4%, after Bjorn Borg (73.4%) and John McEnroe (72.8%).

== Career statistics ==
=== Grand Slam performance timeline ===
Key
W	F	SF	QF	#R	RR	Q#	DNQ	A	NH

(W) winner; (F) finalist; (SF) semifinalist; (QF) quarterfinalist; (#R) rounds 4, 3, 2, 1; (RR) round-robin stage; (Q#) qualification round; (DNQ) did not qualify; (A) absent; (NH) not held; (SR) strike rate (events won / competed); (W–L) win–loss record.
To avoid confusion and double counting, these charts are updated at the conclusion of a tournament or when the player's participation has ended.

Tournament	2007	2008	2009	2010	2011	2012	2013	2014	2015	2016	2017	2018	2019	2020	2021	2022	2023	2024	2025	2026	SR	W–L	Win%
Australian Open	A	A	1R	A	3R	QF	4R	4R	QF	QF	4R	A	QF	A	1R	A	A	A	2R	A	0 / 11	28–11	72%
French Open	A	Q2	A	2R	2R	A	4R	1R	QF	4R	QF	4R	QF	2R	4R	A	A	2R	A	A	0 / 12	27–12	69%
Wimbledon	A	1R	A	1R	1R	3R	3R	4R	2R	4R	3R	QF	QF	NH	2R	A	A	1R	A	A	0 / 13	22–12	65%
US Open	Q2	4R	A	3R	1R	3R	1R	F	1R	SF	A	SF	3R	A	3R	A	A	A	A	Q3	0 / 11	27–11	71%
Win–loss	0–0	3–2	0–1	3–3	3–4	8–3	8–4	12–4	8–3	15–4	9–3	12–3	14–4	1–1	6–4	0–0	0–0	1–2	1–1	0–0	0 / 47	104–46	69%

=== Grand Slam tournament finals ===
==== Singles: 1 (1 runner-up) ====
Outcome	Year	Championship	Surface	Opponent in the final	Score in the final
Loss	2014	US Open	Hard	(Croatia) Marin Čilić	3–6, 3–6, 3–6

== Notes ==
Sporting positions
Preceded by Andy Murray	US Open Series Champion; 2016	Succeeded by Incumbent
Awards
Preceded by Jo-Wilfried Tsonga	ATP Newcomer of the Year; 2008	Succeeded by Horacio Zeballos
