= 1999 Australian Open =

- Date: 18–31 January 1999
- Edition: 87th
- Category: Grand Slam (ITF)
- Surface: Hardcourt (Rebound Ace)
- Location: Melbourne, Australia
- Venue: Melbourne Park

Champions

Men's singles
- (Russia) Yevgeny Kafelnikov

Women's singles
- (Switzerland) Martina Hingis

Men's doubles
- (Sweden) Jonas Björkman / (Australia) Patrick Rafter

Women's doubles
- (Switzerland) Martina Hingis / (Russia) Anna Kournikova

Mixed doubles
- (South Africa) Mariaan de Swardt / (South Africa) David Adams

Boys' singles
- (Denmark) Kristian Pless

Girls' singles
- (France) Virginie Razzano

Boys' doubles
- (Austria) Jürgen Melzer / (Denmark) Kristian Pless

Girls' doubles
- (Greece) Eleni Daniilidou / (France) Virginie Razzano
- Australian Open

The 1999 Australian Open was a tennis tournament played on outdoor hard courts at Melbourne Park in Melbourne, Australia. It was the 87th edition of the Australian Open and was held from 18 through 31 January 1999. This was the first Grand Slam of the calendar year. Total attendance for the event reached 391,504.

In the singles competition, Petr Korda and Martina Hingis were the defending champions. Korda was unseeded at this tournament and was eliminated in the third round by American 15th seed Todd Martin. This loss resulted in him falling down the rankings from 20th to 76th. Later in July, Korda received a suspension from tennis by the ITF after testing positive for nandrolone at Wimbledon last year. Yevgeny Kafelnikov, on the other hand, ended up becoming the men's champion, defeating surprise finalist Swede Thomas Enqvist in four sets. With this win, Kafelnikov became the first Russian, male or female, to win an Australian Open title. In the women's singles, two-time defending champion Martina Hingis successfully defended her title, defeating another surprise finalist in Frenchwoman Amélie Mauresmo. This win allowed Hingis to join Margaret Court, Evonne Goolagong Cawley, Steffi Graf and Monica Seles as the only women to have won three consecutive Australian Open titles. Amélie Mauresmo would later become the World No. 1 in 2004, and despite being one of the top players of the early to mid-2000s, this would be her only Grand Slam final until the 2006 Australian Open, which she won.

In doubles, the defending champions were Jonas Björkman and Jacco Eltingh for the men's, Martina Hingis and Mirjana Lučić for the women's, and Venus Williams and Justin Gimelstob for the mixed. Eltingh did not participate at this year's Australian Open, leaving Björkman to team up with Australia's Pat Rafter. Rafter and Björkman later won the title, defeating the Indian first seeds Mahesh Bhupathi and Leander Paes in five sets. Hingis and Lučić also separated, with Hingis teaming up with Anna Kournikova and Lučić teaming up with Mary Pierce. Lučić and Pierce fell in the first round, but Hingis and Kournikova went on to win, by defeating first seeds Lindsay Davenport and Natasha Zvereva at the final. The mixed doubles competition saw Williams and Gimelstob not competing, and none of the seeds reaching past the second round. In the end, the South African team of Mariaan de Swardt and David Adams won, defeating Williams' sister Serena and her partner Max Mirnyi in the final.

The Juniors Competition saw the first ever junior double, with Kristian Pless and Virginie Razzano both winning their respective singles and doubles titles. Pless defeated Mikhail Youzhny in the singles before teaming up with Jürgen Melzer to defeat the Czech team of Ladislav Chramosta and Michal Navrátil in the doubles. Razzano defeated Katarína Bašternáková in the singles final and teamed up Eleni Daniilidou to defeat South Africans Natalie Grandin and Nicole Rencken in straight sets. The last time a boy won both the singles and doubles title at a Grand Slam was Roger Federer at the previous year's Wimbledon, while the last girl was Cara Black at the Wimbledon the year before. Julien Jeanpierre and Mirjana Lučić were the last players to win Australian Open Junior singles and doubles titles in the same year; in 1998 and 1997 respectively.

== Singles players ==
Men's singles

Champion		Runner-up	
(Russia) Yevgeny Kafelnikov (10)		(Sweden) Thomas Enqvist	
Semifinals out
(Germany) Tommy Haas		(Ecuador) Nicolás Lapentti	
Quarterfinals out
(United States) Todd Martin (15)	(United States) Vincent Spadea	(Switzerland) Marc Rosset	(Slovakia) Karol Kučera (7)
4th round out
(Zimbabwe) Wayne Black	(Romania) Andrei Pavel	(France) Fabrice Santoro	(United States) Andre Agassi (5)
(Czech Republic) Bohdan Ulihrach	(Australia) Mark Philippoussis (14)	(South Africa) Wayne Ferreira	(Australia) Andrew Ilie
3rd round out
(Italy) Gianluca Pozzi	(Czech Republic) Petr Korda	(United States) Jim Courier	(United States) Paul Goldstein
(Germany) Nicolas Kiefer	(Canada) Daniel Nestor	(Czech Republic) Martin Damm	(Czech Republic) Jiří Novák
(United Kingdom) Tim Henman (6)	(United States) Jeff Tarango	(Slovakia) Ján Krošlák	(Australia) Patrick Rafter (3)
(Russia) Marat Safin	(Netherlands) Richard Krajicek (9)	(Sweden) Mikael Tillström	(Norway) Christian Ruud
2nd round out
(France) Lionel Roux	(Ukraine) Andrei Medvedev	(Spain) Julian Alonso	(Germany) Hendrik Dreekmann
(Australia) Jason Stoltenberg	(Morocco) Younes El Aynaoui	(France) Stéphane Huet	(United Kingdom) Greg Rusedski (8)
(United States) Cecil Mamiit	(Germany) Guillaume Raoux	(Netherlands) Sjeng Schalken	(Australia) Lleyton Hewitt
(Armenia) Sargis Sargsian	(Argentina) Franco Squillari	(France) Arnaud Clément	(Czech Republic) Slava Doseděl
(Australia) Sandon Stolle	(Germany) Jens Knippschild	(Netherlands) Paul Haarhuis	(Russia) Andrei Cherkasov
(United States) Michael Chang	(Argentina) Mariano Puerta	(Zimbabwe) Byron Black	(Australia) Mark Woodforde
(Italy) Davide Sanguinetti	(Brazil) Gustavo Kuerten	(Czech Republic) Daniel Vacek	(Argentina) Mariano Zabaleta
(Sweden) Magnus Norman	(United States) Justin Gimelstob	(France) Jérôme Golmard	(Spain) Àlex Corretja (2)
1st round out
(Spain) Óscar Serrano	(Spain) Albert Portas	(Romania) Adrian Voinea	(South Africa) Justin Bower
(Spain) Galo Blanco	(Canada) Sébastien Lareau	(Spain) Carlos Costa	(Brazil) Fernando Meligeni
(Sweden) Jonas Björkman	(Sweden) Fredrik Jonsson	(Netherlands) Peter Wessels	(Spain) Félix Mantilla
(France) Arnaud Di Pasquale	(Spain) Javier Sánchez	(Denmark) Kenneth Carlsen	(Australia) Scott Draper
(Spain) Carlos Moyá (4)	(Austria) Stefan Koubek	(Spain) Alberto Martín	(United States) David Caldwell
(Belarus) Vladimir Voltchkov	(Austria) Thomas Muster	(Germany) Michael Kohlmann	(France) Cédric Pioline (13)
(Spain) Albert Costa (12)	(Netherlands) Jan Siemerink	(Paraguay) Ramón Delgado	(Germany) Lars Burgsmüller
(United States) Steve Campbell	(Spain) Francisco Clavet	(Romania) Dinu Pescariu	(Argentina) Hernán Gumy
(Morocco) Karim Alami	(Argentina) Guillermo Cañas	(Australia) Todd Woodbridge	(Australia) Wayne Arthurs
(Australia) Michael Tebbutt	(Spain) Alberto Berasategui	(France) Sébastien Grosjean	(Germany) Bernd Karbacher
(United States) Geoff Grant	(New Zealand) Brett Steven	(Costa Rica) Juan Antonio Marín	(Brazil) Márcio Carlsson
(Australia) Toby Mitchell	(United States) Jan-Michael Gambill	(Australia) Mark Draper	(Germany) Oliver Gross
(Spain) Fernando Vicente	(India) Leander Paes	(Germany) David Prinosil	(South Africa) Marcos Ondruska
(Austria) Markus Hipfl	(Slovakia) Dominik Hrbatý	(Australia) Joseph Sirianni	(Morocco) Hicham Arazi
(Sweden) Thomas Johansson (16)	(Netherlands) John van Lottum	(Italy) Laurence Tieleman	(Germany) Rainer Schüttler
(Netherlands) Edwin Kempes	(Czech Republic) Petr Luxa	(Argentina) Lucas Arnold Ker	(Japan) Takao Suzuki

Women's singles

Champion		Runner-up	
(Switzerland) Martina Hingis (2)		(France) Amélie Mauresmo	
Semifinals out
(United States) Lindsay Davenport (1)		(United States) Monica Seles (6)	
Quarterfinals out
(United States) Venus Williams (5)	(Belgium) Dominique Van Roost (11)	(Germany) Steffi Graf (10)	(France) Mary Pierce (7)
4th round out
(Canada) Maureen Drake	(United States) Chanda Rubin	(Spain) María Sánchez Lorenzo	(France) Émilie Loit
(France) Sandrine Testud (14)	(Austria) Barbara Schett	(Russia) Anna Kournikova (12)	(South Africa) Amanda Coetzer (16)
3rd round out
(Slovakia) Karina Habšudová	(Austria) Sylvia Plischke	(Belarus) Natasha Zvereva (15)	(Romania) Ruxandra Dragomir
(Czech Republic) Jana Novotná (3)	(Canada) Jana Nejedly	(Spain) Conchita Martínez (9)	(Australia) Nicole Pratt
(Belgium) Sabine Appelmans	(United States) Serena Williams	(United States) Mary Joe Fernández	(Russia) Elena Likhovtseva
(Italy) Rita Grande	(Germany) Andrea Glass	(Chinese Taipei) Janet Lee	(Australia) Jelena Dokić
2nd round out
(Argentina) Florencia Labat	(France) Lea Ghirardi	(Australia) Rachel McQuillan	(Germany) Anke Huber
(United States) Meilen Tu	(Bulgaria) Elena Pampoulova	(United States) Jane Chi	(Sweden) Åsa Carlsson
(Slovakia) Henrieta Nagyová	(United States) Jennifer Capriati	(Romania) Cătălina Cristea	(Netherlands) Seda Noorlander
(United States) Brie Rippner	(Israel) Anna Smashnova	(United Kingdom) Samantha Smith	(Switzerland) Patty Schnyder (8)
(France) Alexia Dechaume-Balleret	(Italy) Adriana Serra Zanetti	(Spain) Magüi Serna	(Belgium) Els Callens
(Austria) Barbara Schwartz	(United States) Amy Frazier	(Spain) Virginia Ruano Pascual	(Spain) Arantxa Sánchez Vicario (4)
(Luxembourg) Anne Kremer	(China) Li Fang	(Russia) Tatiana Panova	(Japan) Miho Saeki
(France) Julie Halard-Decugis	(United States) Samantha Reeves	(United States) Kristina Brandi	(Russia) Elena Dementieva
1st round out
(Spain) Gala León García	(Indonesia) Nany Basuki	(South Korea) Park Sung-hee	(United States) Lisa Raymond
(Belgium) Laurence Courtois	(Japan) Yuka Yoshida	(Czech Republic) Květa Hrdličková	(Romania) Irina Spîrlea (13)
(Slovakia) Katarína Studeníková	(United States) Kimberly Po	(Germany) Marlene Weingärtner	(Greece) Christine Papadáki
(United States) Karin Miller	(Australia) Annabel Ellwood	(Spain) Cristina Torrens Valero	(Croatia) Silvija Talaja
(France) Anne-Gaëlle Sidot	(Netherlands) Kristie Boogert	(Australia) Evie Dominikovic	(United States) Sandra Cacic
(Zimbabwe) Cara Black	(Bulgaria) Pavlina Stoyanova	(Netherlands) Miriam Oremans	(Russia) Nadia Petrova
(Czech Republic) Adriana Gerši	(France) Nathalie Dechy	(Ukraine) Elena Tatarkova	(Croatia) Mirjana Lučić
(Venezuela) Maria-Alejandra Vento	(Latvia) Larisa Neiland	(United States) Corina Morariu	(United States) Erika deLone
(Slovenia) Tina Križan	(Czech Republic) Denisa Chládková	(Argentina) Mariana Díaz Oliva	(Spain) Conchita Martínez Granados
(France) Sarah Pitkowski	(Romania) Raluca Sandu	(Chinese Taipei) Wang Shi-ting	(United States) Tara Snyder
(Argentina) Paola Suárez	(United States) Meghann Shaughnessy	(Italy) Laura Golarsa	(Japan) Ai Sugiyama
(Czech Republic) Radka Bobková	(Japan) Nana Miyagi	(Germany) Jana Kandarr	(Germany) Mariaan de Swardt
(Australia) Cindy Watson	(Australia) Catherine Barclay	(Hungary) Rita Kuti-Kis	(Italy) Tathiana Garbin
(Italy) Silvia Farina	(Thailand) Tamarine Tanasugarn	(Canada) Sonya Jeyaseelan	(United States) Jill Craybas
(Czech Republic) Sandra Kleinová	(Australia) Alicia Molik	(Czech Republic) Lenka Němečková	(Italy) Flora Perfetti
(Russia) Elena Makarova	(France) Amélie Cocheteux	(Italy) Gloria Pizzichini	(United States) Lilia Osterloh

== Events ==
=== Seniors ===
There were five competitions open to professional tennis players. The Association of Tennis Professionals and Women's Tennis Association awarded ranking points in all events apart from the mixed doubles. The singles draws were contested by one hundred and twenty eight players, while sixty four teams partook in the doubles events, and thirty two teams lined up in the mixed doubles competition.

==== Men's singles ====
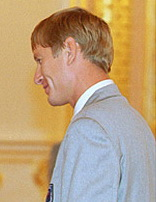
Yevgeny Kafelnikov won his first Australian Open title in a tournament filled with numerous upsets.

With World No. 1 Pete Sampras absent, along with World No. 2 and last year's finalist Marcelo Ríos, the No. 1 spot was thought to be up for grabs coming into this year's Australian Open. Andre Agassi was considered the favourite, having won the 1995 Australian Open and having what was thought to be an easy path to the semifinals, Carlos Moyá being the only player considered to be a threat to him. Patrick Rafter was also considered a favourite, despite having in-form players Thomas Enqvist and Mark Philippoussis in his path. Àlex Corretja was another possibility to claim the No. 1 spot, being the World No. 3 and only a third round appearance to defend.

With Ríos' withdrawal, Àlex Corretja was the top seed at No. 2, with US Open champion Patrick Rafter, French Open champion Carlos Moyá and Andre Agassi following. Tim Henman, last year's semifinalist Karol Kučera, Greg Rusedski, Richard Krajicek and Yevgeny Kafelnikov made up the rest of the top 10 seeds. Despite being the defending champion, Petr Korda was not seeded as he was outside the Top 17.

The first round saw the first upset of the tournament, with Moyá falling to World No. 37 Nicolas Kiefer in four sets. 12th seed Albert Costa, 13th seed Cédric Pioline and 16th seed Thomas Johansson also fell in the first round. Corretja, 15th seed Todd Martin and Korda all survived five set encounters. The second round saw the end of Corretja's No. 1 dreams as went down in four sets to World No. 86 Christian Ruud. Rusedski was also the victim of an upset, falling to qualifier Paul Goldstein also in four sets. The third round saw further upsets, as Rafter fell in four sets to Enqvist, Henman went down to Swiss Marc Rosset in three, and Krajicek went down to Wayne Ferreira in five. The third round also saw the end of Korda, falling to Martin in five sets; and Kafelnikov survive an encounter with 1992 and 1993 champion Jim Courier, Courier having retired in the fourth set.

The fourth round saw Martin, Kafelnikov and Kučera being the only seeds to progress to the quarterfinals. 14th seed Mark Philippoussis fell to Enqvist, and Agassi was defeated by World No. 44 Vincent Spadea in four sets. Unseeded players Tommy Haas, Nicolás Lapentti and Marc Rosset also progressed. The quarterfinals saw the end of Martin, being defeated by Kafelnikov in three sets. It also saw Haas defeating Spadea, and Enqvist continuing his good form against Rosset. The quarterfinals also witnessed the end of Kučera, being defeated in a five-set contest against Lapentti. This meant that Sampras would not be forfeiting his No. 1 ranking as previously predicted.

The semifinals saw the final seed in the draw, Kafelnikov, progressing past Haas in three sets to reach his first Grand Slam final since 1996. His opponent was Enqvist, who also passed to the final in three sets, defeating Lapentti. The final saw Enqvist win the first set, before Kafelnikov came back to take the next three. Kafelnikov's ranking rose to No. 3 following this tournament, and he became the first Russian tennis player to win the Australian Open.

Championship match result

(Russia) Yevgeny Kafelnikov defeated (Sweden) Thomas Enqvist, 4–6, 6–0, 6–3, 7–6^{(7–1)}

==== Women's singles ====
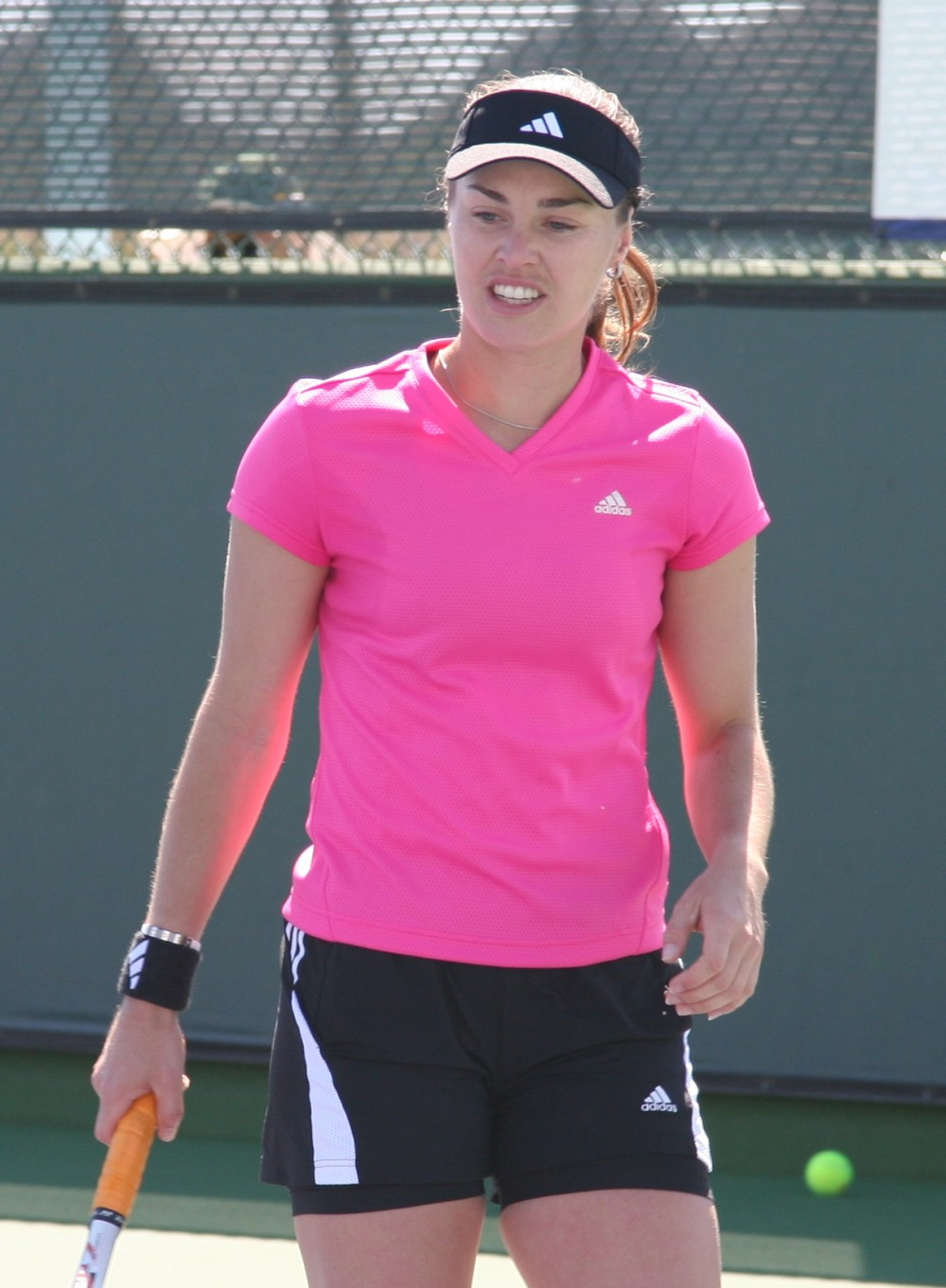
Martina Hingis won her third Australian Open and fifth Grand Slam title.

The seeds of the 1999 Australian Open were led by the previous year's Grand Slam champions. US Open champion Lindsay Davenport was the first seed, Australian Open champion Martina Hingis came second, Wimbledon champion Jana Novotná was third and French Open champion Arantxa Sánchez Vicario was fourth. Following behind came Venus Williams, four-time Australian Open champion Monica Seles, 1995 Australian Open champion Mary Pierce, Patty Schnyder, last year's Australian Open finalist Conchita Martínez, and four-time Australian Open winner Steffi Graf. Dominique Van Roost, Anna Kournikova, Irina Spîrlea, Sandrine Testud, Natasha Zvereva and Amanda Coetzer were also seeded.

The first round of the women's singles saw every seed go through except for 13th seed Irina Spîrlea, who lost to former finalist and last year's semifinalist Anke Huber, 7–5, 6–4. There was a scare, however, for 5th seed Venus Williams, who dropped the first set to World No. 82 Croatian Silvija Talaja, 3–6, and was struggling through the third; at one point being two points away from defeat. However, in the end, she managed to survive, winning, 3–6, 6–3, 9–7. The second round was the setting for the first major upset of the tournament when 4th seed and two-time finalist Arantxa Sánchez Vicario fell easily to the World No. 24 Barbara Schett, 6–2, 6–2. 8th seed Patty Schnyder also fell in the second round to teenage Frenchwoman and World No. 29, Amélie Mauresmo, 6–7^{(1–7)}, 6–4, 6–3.

The third round saw 15th seed Natasha Zvereva fall to Chanda Rubin in three sets, last year's finalist and 9th seed Conchita Martínez go down in three sets to Émilie Loit in what was Loit's first Top 10 victory, and another major upset when 3rd seed Jana Novotná lost to Spaniard María Sánchez Lorenzo, 6–3, 6–0. 14th seed Sandrine Testud was almost the victim of another upset, but she saved two match points against her opponent Serena Williams and defeated her, 6–2, 2–6, 9–7. The third round also saw the end of home dreams, when Aussies Nicole Pratt and Jelena Dokić both fell to Amélie Mauresmo and Martina Hingis respectively. The fourth round saw an easy progression for the World No. 1 Lindsay Davenport over the last qualifier remaining, Canadian Maureen Drake. Fellow Americans Venus Williams and Monica Seles also had easy wins; as did Steffi Graf, Mary Pierce and Dominique Van Roost. Defending champion Martina Hingis lost the second set to Amanda Coetzer, but came back to easily take the third, 6–1. The final spot in the quarterfinals was decided by an all-French match between Émilie Loit and Amélie Mauresmo. Mauresmo won the first set without losing a game, and then went on to win the second set, 7–5, despite a valiant effort from Loit.

"She's here with her girlfriend. She's half a man."

— Martina Hingis, referring to Amélie Mauresmo on the eve of their final.

The quarterfinals saw Davenport easily defeat Williams, Hingis breeze through Pierce, and Seles coming back from 4–5 down in the first set to defeat Graf, 7–5, 6–1, which would be the last match in their rivalry which Seles won; and her only post-stabbing victory over Graf. Surprise quarterfinalist Mauresmo continued her momentum, causing another upset by defeating Van Roost in two sets. In the semifinals, Mauresmo went on to cause the biggest upset of the tournament, by defeating the World No. 1 Davenport in three sets, 4–6, 7–5, 7–5, despite Davenport leading 4–2 in the third set. On the other side, Martina Hingis reached her third consecutive Australian Open final, having defeating Monica Seles, 6–2, 6–4, and restricting Seles' Open Era record for an Australian Open winning streak made by a woman to 33. In the final, Hingis defeated Mauresmo in straight sets, 6–2, 6–3. With this win, Hingis joined Margaret Court, Evonne Goolagong Cawley, Steffi Graf and Monica Seles as the only women to have won three consecutive Australian Open titles.

Championship match result

(Switzerland) Martina Hingis defeated (France) Amélie Mauresmo, 6–2, 6–3

==== Men's doubles ====
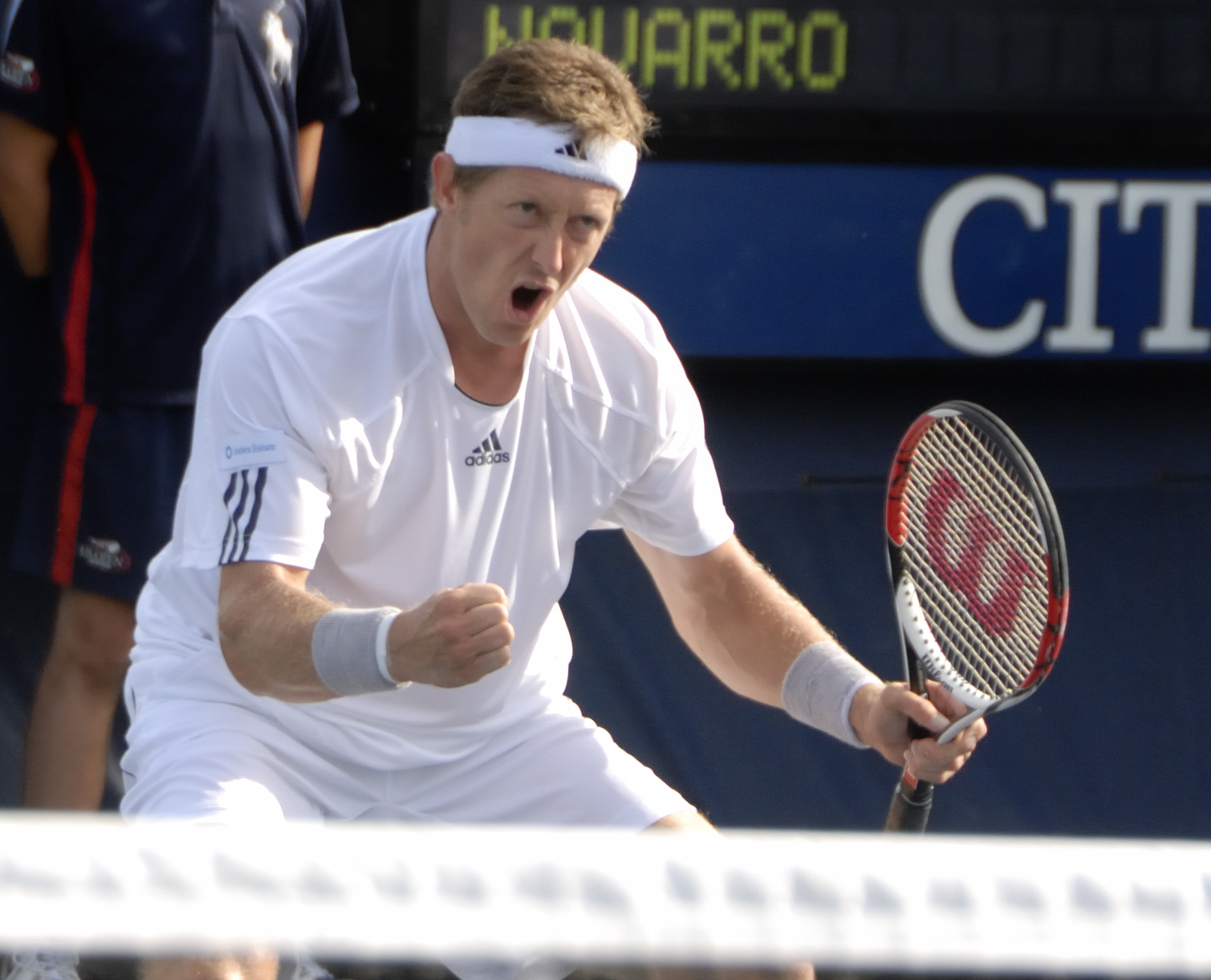
Jonas Björkman successfully defended his Australian Open doubles title.

Last year's double star and defending champion Jacco Eltingh retired at the end of the previous year, so his former partner Jonas Björkman teamed up with countryman Patrick Rafter as the fifth seed.

The other top seeds were "Indian Express" (Mahesh Bhupathi and Leander Paes) at No. 1, the "Woodies" (Todd Woodbridge and Mark Woodforde) at No. 2, Mark Knowles and Daniel Nestor at No. 3, and Ellis Ferreira and Rick Leach at No. 4. Former Eltingh partner Paul Haarhuis teamed up with Patrick Galbraith to make the sixth seeded team. Frenchmen Olivier Delaître and Fabrice Santoro were No. 7; and Sébastien Lareau and Alex O'Brien came at No. 8.

The first round saw half of the No. 9 to No. 16 seeds fall; and Lareau and O'Brien joining them. Knowles and Nestor fell in the second round, and Delaître and Santoro went out in the third round. Apart from those casualties, however, all of the Top 8 made the quarterfinals. Also in the quarterfinals were Americans Richey Reneberg and Jonathan Stark, Gustavo Kuerten and Nicolás Lapentti; and tenth seeds Yevgeny Kafelnikov and Daniel Vacek.

Kuerten and Lapentti withdrew from the quarterfinals due to Lapentti's unexpected run to the semifinals of the singles competition. As such, Björkman and Rafter (who would've been their opponents) got an effective bye to the semifinals of the doubles. First seeds Bhupathi and Paes joined them, after triumphing over Reneberg and Stark; second seeds Woodbridge and Woodforde followed, defeating Kafelnikov and Vacek; and fourth seeds Ferreira and Leach also went through, defeating Galbraith and Haarhuis.

Bhupathi and Paes easily defeated Ferreira and Leach, 7–6^{(7–1)}, 6–3, 7–6^{(7–5)} to end up in the final, where they were joined by Björkman and Rafter; who came back from two sets down to defeat the Woodies, 3–6, 4–6, 6–2, 6–2, 8–6. The final of the men's doubles ended up also going to five sets after Bhupathi and Paes won a very close tiebreaker in the fourth (12–10). However, Björkman and Rafter took out the fifth set 6–4 to claim Björkman's second and Rafter's only Grand Slam doubles title.

Championship match result

(Sweden) Jonas Björkman / (Australia) Patrick Rafter defeated (India) Mahesh Bhupathi / (India) Leander Paes, 6–3, 4–6, 6–4, 6–7^{(10–12)}, 6–4

==== Women's doubles ====
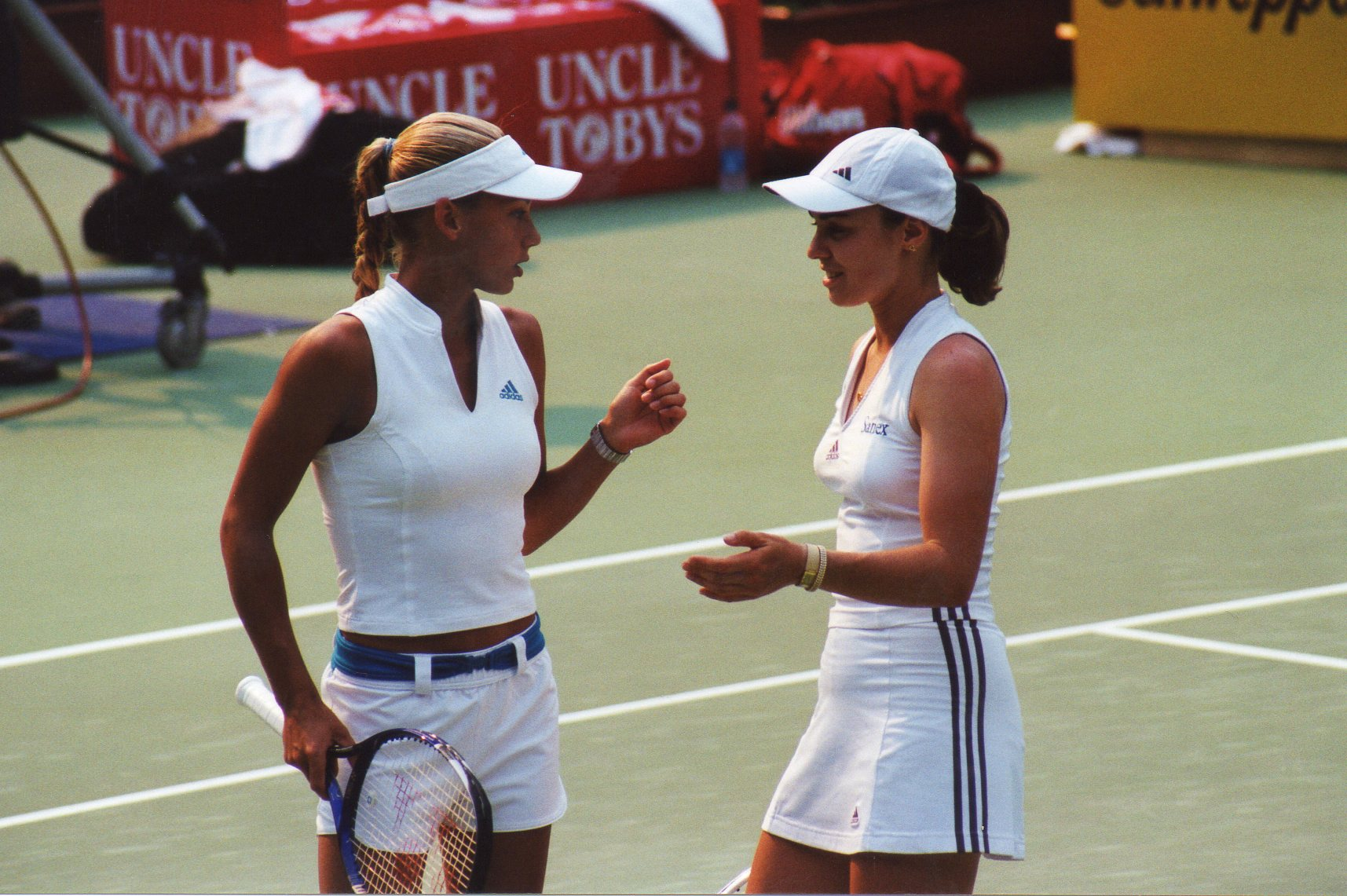
Anna Kournikova (left) and Martina Hingis (right) won their first Grand Slam as a team.

With none of the teams present having won a Grand Slam doubles title together, the competition was wide open. Lindsay Davenport and Natasha Zvereva were the first seeds, having lost in the finals of all the Grand Slams last year. Lisa Raymond and Rennae Stubbs followed them as the second seed, while last year's doubles star and defending champion Martina Hingis and her new doubles partner Anna Kournikova were the third seed. Veterans Larisa Neiland and Arantxa Sánchez Vicario teamed up to make the fourth seed, while Elena Likhovtseva and Ai Sugiyama came in at No. 5. Conchita Martínez and Patricia Tarabini; Mariaan de Swardt and Elena Tatarkova; and Irina Spîrlea and Caroline Vis were the rest of the top eight seeds. Hingis' former doubles partner and fellow defending champion Mirjana Lučić teamed up with Mary Pierce as the sixteenth seed.

The first round saw one major casualty in Martínez and Tarabini, who fell to wildcards Jelena Dokić and Åsa Carlsson. The first round also saw a quick end to Lučić and Pierce, who fell in straight sets to Christina Singer and Helena Vildová. The second round saw the fall of Likhovtseva and Sugiyama, and Spîrlea and Vis. The only major casualty of the third round was de Swardt and Tatarkova.

All the top three seeds made it to the semifinals, and they were joined by the up-and-coming Williams sisters, who defeated Neiland and Sánchez Vicario en route. Davenport and Zvereva defeated the Williams sisters to reach the final, in what is their fifth consecutive Grand Slam final; and Davenport's fourth consecutive Australian Open final in doubles. They were joined by Hingis and Kournikova, in what is also Hingis' fifth consecutive Grand Slam doubles final and Kournikova's first. Hingis and Kournikova triumphed in straight sets, 7–5, 6–3, to make Hingis' fifth doubles Grand Slam win and the fifth doubles Grand Slam defeat of Davenport and Zvereva.

Championship match result

(Switzerland) Martina Hingis / (Russia) Anna Kournikova defeated (United States) Lindsay Davenport / (Belarus) Natasha Zvereva, 7–5, 6–3

==== Mixed doubles ====
The seeds for the mixed doubles title were led by 1991 French Open finalists Caroline Vis and Paul Haarhuis. Anna Kournikova and Mark Knowles came second, while Rennae Stubbs and Jim Grabb and Mirjana Lučić and Mahesh Bhupathi followed.

In a massive surprise, all of the top three seeds fell in the first round, with No. 6 seeds Katrina Adams and Leander Paes and No. 8 seeds Lisa Raymond and Patrick Galbraith following. The second round saw no seeds progressing to the quarterfinals. Lučić and Bhupathi fell to Kimberly Po and Donald Johnson; No. 5 seeds Larisa Neiland and Rick Leach went down to Debbie Graham and Ellis Ferreira; while No. 7 seeds Elena Tatarkova and Cyril Suk were defeated by Mariaan de Swardt and David Adams.

The semifinals had Manon Bollegraf and Pablo Albano, who defeated Vis and Haarhuis earlier, draw against wildcards Serena Williams and Max Mirnyi, who defeated Stubbs and Grabb. The other side had Graham and Ferreira drawn against de Swardt and Adams. Williams and Mirnyi easily defeated Bollegraf and Albano in straight sets, while de Swardt and Adams came back from a set down to defeat Graham and Ferreira. In the final, de Swardt and Adams triumphed after losing the second set to take the decider in a close tiebreak.

Championship match result

(South Africa) Mariaan de Swardt / (South Africa) David Adams defeated (United States) Serena Williams / (Belarus) Max Mirnyi, 6–4, 4–6, 7–6^{(7–5)}

=== Juniors ===
==== Boys' singles ====
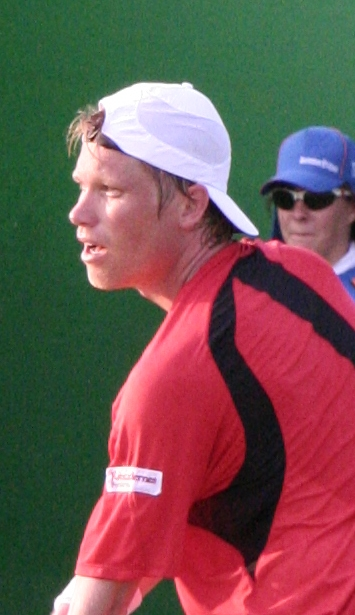
Kristian Pless won both the singles and the doubles titles

Dane Kristian Pless headed the seeds of the Boys' Singles, with Jarkko Nieminen, Ladislav Chramosta, Éric Prodon and Jaroslav Levinský made up the rest of the Top 5.

All the seeds passed the first round without severe difficulty. The first upsets came in the second round Chramosta fell to American Levar Harper-Griffith, and fellow seeds David Martin, Mark Hilton and Alex Bogomolov Jr. joining him.

The quarterfinals consisted off Pless, 8th seed Jean-Christophe Faurel, Harper-Griffith, Francesco Aldi (who upset 7th seed Andy Roddick en route), Levinský, Prodon, Simone Amorico (who upset 6th seed Jürgen Melzer) and Mikhail Youzhny (who defeated Nieminen). Pless defeated Faurel, Aldi defeated Harper-Griffith, and Youzhny defeated Amorico all in two sets, while Levinský took three sets involving a lengthy third set to defeat Prodon, 3–6, 6–0, 9–7.

Pless only dropped two games to defeat Aldi and advance to the final. His opponent was Youzhny, who defeated Levinský, 7–6, 7–5. Pless defeated Youzhny, 6–4, 6–3, to capture the Boys' Singles title.

Championship match result

(Denmark) Kristian Pless defeated (Russia) Mikhail Youzhny, 6–4, 6–3

==== Girls' singles ====
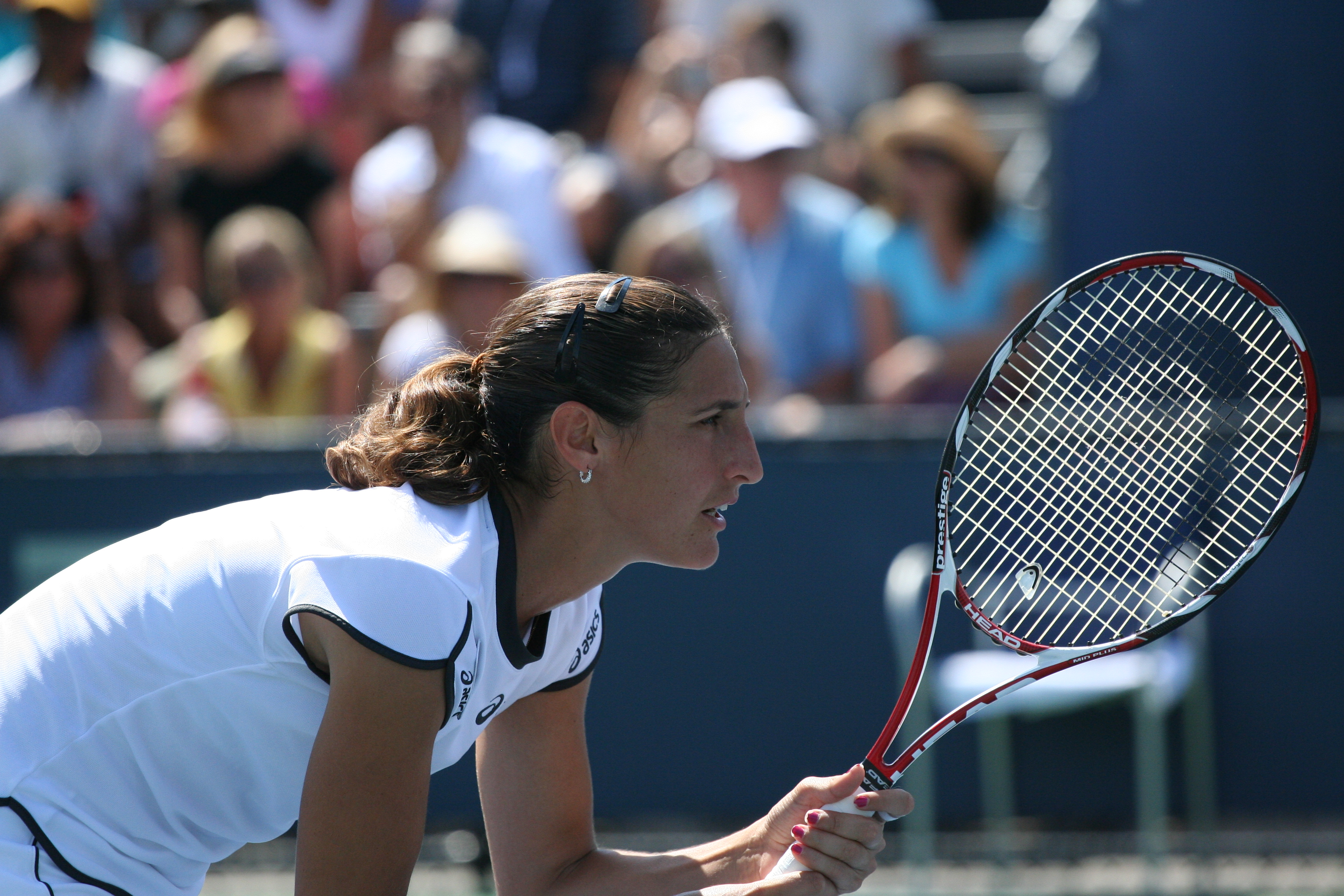
Virginie Razzano only dropped 25 games during the entire tournament.

The field for this year's Girls' Singles was headed by Nadia Petrova, who despite being the first seed, had to go through the qualifying. Slovenia's Tina Hergold was seeded second, and Wynne Prakusya was third, despite also having to go through qualifying. Greek Eleni Daniilidou and American Ansley Cargill made the rest of the Top 5.

The first round saw a quick end to Cargill, winning only three games against Italian qualifier Flavia Pennetta. 7th seed Iveta Benešová also departed, along with 15th seed Györgyi Zsíros. Three further seeds were defeated in the second round: Czech 8th seed Dája Bedáňová, 11th seed Michelle Gerards, and 16th seed Aniela Mojzis.

Petrova, Hergold and Daniilidou all made the quarterfinals. Prakusya was upset in three sets by New Zealand's 12th seed Leanne Baker. 13th Virginie Razzano also made it the quarterfinals, as did 9th seed Katarína Bašternáková by defeating American 8th seed Laura Granville en route. Unseeded players Hannah Collin and Roberta Vinci also made a quarterfinal appearance.

Petrova and Hergold defeated Collin and Vinci to reach the semifinals in two sets. Bašternáková disposed of Baker in three to meet Hergold, while Razzano dropped the first set but won the next two to upset Daniilidou and meet Petrova. The semifinals saw Razzano stun Petrova by defeating the Russian in straight sets. Bašternáková was struggling against Hergold, but ended up winning in three sets to make a final appearance. Razzano ended up dominating Bašternáková in the final, only dropping two games to win.

Championship match result

(France) Virginie Razzano defeated (Slovakia) Katarína Bašternáková, 6–1, 6–1

==== Boys' doubles ====
Americans Bo Hodge and David Martin were the first seeds. Czechs Ladislav Chramosta and Michal Navrátil came second, while Jürgen Melzer teamed up with the first seed in singles, Kristian Pless, as the third seeded team.

The first round saw an early exit to Hodge and Martin, falling to Canadians Philip Gubenco and Charles-Antoine Sévigny. South African fifth seeds Andrew McDade and Dirk Stegmann, Norwegian fifth seeds Stian Boretti and Jørgen Vestli, and American sixth seeds Simone Amorico and Alex Bogomolov Jr. also fell. The remaining seeds then proceeded through the quarterfinals without too much trouble.

Chramosta and Navrátil got a virtual bye through to the semifinals after their opponents, Maximilian Abel and Jaroslav Levinský, withdrew. Melzer and Pless passed easily to the semifinals, as did Italian fourth seeds Francesco Aldi and Stefano Mocci. Gubenco and Sévigny also advanced.

Melzer and Pless fought off a three-set contest from their Canadian opponents to win, 6–2, 4–6, 6–2. The other semifinal match saw Chramosta and Navrátil recover from losing the first set in a tiebreak, to win the second in another tiebreak and the third in a bagel. The first set of the final also ended up being a tiebreak, which went to the Czechs. However, Melzer and Pless came back, only dropping three games, to take the next two sets and the championships.

Championship match result

(Austria) Jürgen Melzer / (Denmark) Kristian Pless defeated (Czech Republic) Ladislav Chramosta / (Czech Republic) Michal Navrátil, 6–7, 6–3, 6–0

==== Girls' doubles ====
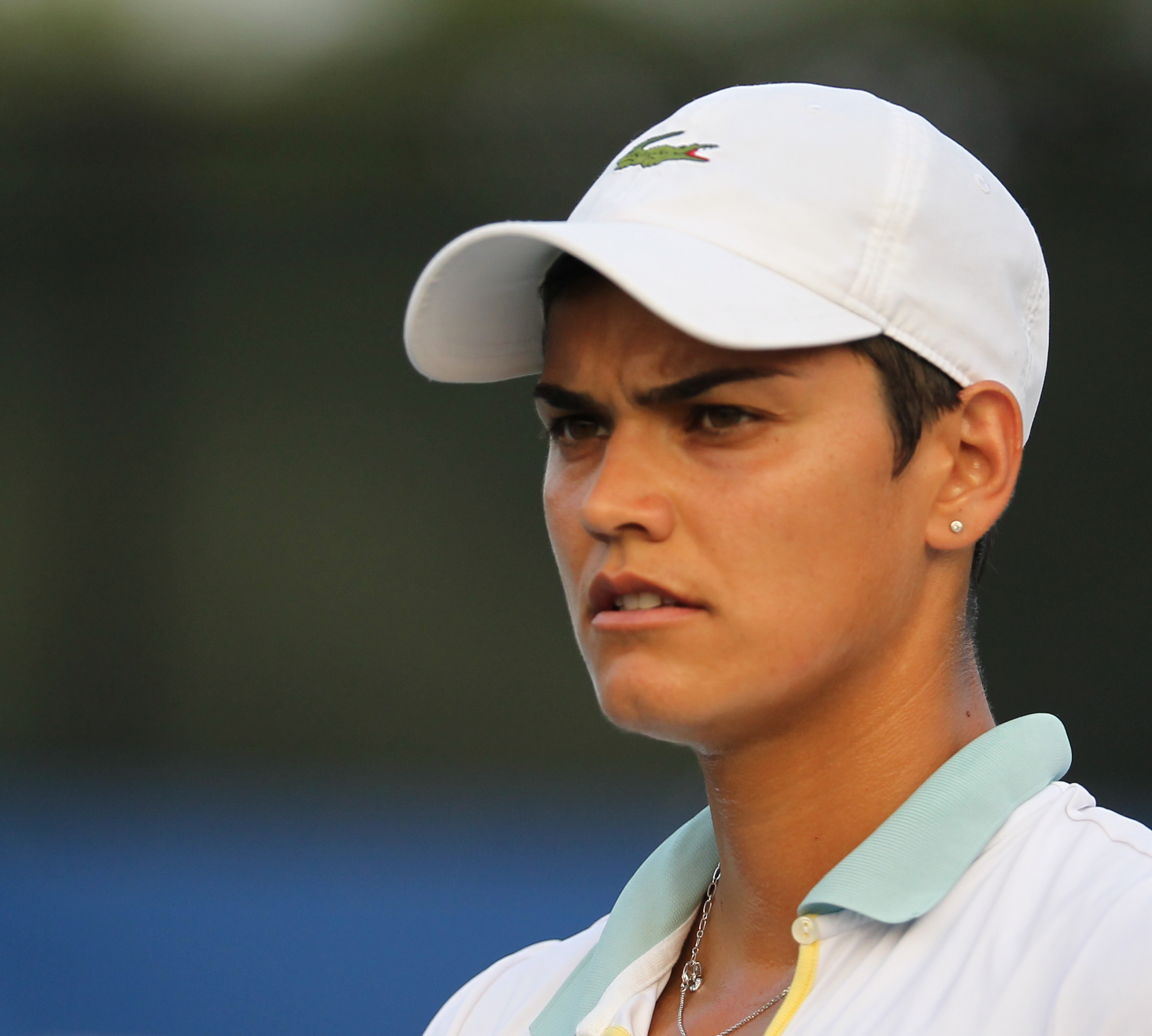
Eleni Daniilidou won her first Junior Grand Slam title.

The American team of Ansley Cargill and Lindsay Dawaf led the field, with Dája Bedáňová and Aniela Mojzis following as the second seeds, and Slovaks Katarína Bašternáková and Zuzana Kučová coming in third.

The first round witnessed the defeat of the fourth seeded Czechs Dominika Luzarová and Iveta Benešová, as well as the defeat of the sixth, seventh and eighth seeds. The second round saw one further upset, with Cargill and Dawaf falling to Eleni Daniilidou and Virginie Razzano. Despite winning the first set, 6–4, the Americans only won one game in the final two sets.

Bedáňová and Mojzis progressed through to the semifinals by defeating Aussies Monique Adamczak and Sarah Stone in three sets. No such success came, however, for Bašternáková and Kučová, as they fell in two sets to South African fifth seeds Natalie Grandin and Nicole Rencken. Daniilidou and Razzano also progressed, while the final spot in the semifinals was won by home hopes Melanie-Ann Clayton and Nicole Sewell.

Clayton and Sewell won the first set against Daniilidou and Razzano, but the Europeans prevailed, 3–6, 6–3, 6–4. The other semifinal match also went to three sets, but Grandin and Rencken ended up defeating Bedáňová and Mojzis, 6–4, 4–6, 6–4. The final was decisive, with Daniilidou and Razzano dominating Grandin and Rencken throughout, only dropping two games to win, 6–1, 6–1.

Championship match result

(Greece) Eleni Daniilidou / (France) Virginie Razzano defeated (South Africa) Natalie Grandin / (South Africa) Nicole Rencken, 6–1, 6–1

== Singles seeds ==
=== Men's singles ===
Seed	Rank	Player	Points before	Points defending	Points after	New points	Status
2	3	(Spain) Àlex Corretja	3550			3530	Second round lost to (Norway) Christian Ruud
3	4	(Australia) Patrick Rafter	3269			3264	Third round lost to (Sweden) Thomas Enqvist
4	5	(Spain) Carlos Moyá	3178			3178	First round lost to (Germany) Nicolas Kiefer
5	6	(United States) Andre Agassi	2879			2845	Fourth round lost to (United States) Vincent Spadea
6	7	(United Kingdom) Tim Henman	2608			2608	Third round lost to (Switzerland) Marc Rosset
7	11	(Slovakia) Karol Kučera	2498			2261	Quarterfinals lost to (Ecuador) Nicolás Lapentti
8	8	(United Kingdom) Greg Rusedski	2568			2568	Second round lost to (United States) Paul Goldstein (Q)
9	9	(Netherlands) Richard Krajicek	2548			2575	Third round lost to (South Africa) Wayne Ferreira
10	10	(Russia) Yevgeny Kafelnikov	2515			3419	Champion, won in the final against (Sweden) Thomas Enqvist
12	14	(Spain) Albert Costa	1817			1817	First round lost to (Czech Republic) Martin Damm
13	15	(France) Cédric Pioline	1800			1678	First round lost to (Australia) Lleyton Hewitt (WC)
14	16	(Australia) Mark Philippoussis	1762			1898	Fourth round lost to (Sweden) Thomas Enqvist
15	13	(United States) Todd Martin	1944			2152	Quarterfinals lost to (Russia) Yevgeny Kafelnikov [10]
16	17	(Sweden) Thomas Johansson	1761			1761	First round lost to (Ecuador) Nicolás Lapentti

==== Withdrawn players ====
Rank	Player	Points before	Points defending	New points	Reason
1	(United States) Pete Sampras	3,915	171	3,744	Back injury
2	(Chile) Marcelo Ríos	3,564	595	2,969	Hamstring injury
12	(Croatia) Goran Ivanišević	2,082	0	2,082	Shoulder injury

=== Women's singles ===
Seed	Rank	Player	Points before	Points defending	Points after	New points	Status
1	1	(United States) Lindsay Davenport	5,951	396	380	5,935	Semifinals lost to (France) Amélie Mauresmo
2	2	(Switzerland) Martina Hingis	5,565	846	828	5,547	Champion, defeated (France) Amélie Mauresmo
3	3	(Czech Republic) Jana Novotná	3,734	0	90	3,823	Third round lost to (Spain) María Sánchez Lorenzo
4	5	(Spain) Arantxa Sánchez Vicario	3,221	200	46	3,067	Second round lost to (Austria) Barbara Schett
5	6	(United States) Venus Williams	3,034	216	196	3,014	Quarterfinals lost to (United States) Lindsay Davenport [1]
6	4	(United States) Monica Seles	3,226	0	430	3,656	Semifinals lost to (Switzerland) Martina Hingis [2]
7	7	(France) Mary Pierce	2,558	208	232	2,582	Quarterfinals lost to (Switzerland) Martina Hingis [2]
8	9	(Switzerland) Patty Schnyder	2,369	142	30	2,257	Second round lost to (France) Amélie Mauresmo
9	10	(Spain) Conchita Martínez	2,325	644	68	1,749	Third round lost to (France) Émilie Loit
10	8	(Germany) Steffi Graf	2,447	0	204	2,651	Quarterfinals lost to (United States) Monica Seles [6]
11	12	(Belgium) Dominique Van Roost	2,086	56	166	2,196	Quarterfinals lost to (France) Amélie Mauresmo
12	13	(Russia) Anna Kournikova	1,971	76	100	1,995	Fourth round lost to (France) Mary Pierce [7]
13	14	(Romania) Irina Spîrlea	1,926	2	2	1,926	First round lost to (Germany) Anke Huber
14	15	(France) Sandrine Testud	1,885	190	140	1,835	Fourth round lost to (United States) Monica Seles [6]
15	17	(Belarus) Natasha Zvereva	1,658	110	56	1,604	Third round lost to (United States) Chanda Rubin
16	16	(South Africa) Amanda Coetzer	1,786	134	126	1,778	Fourth round lost to (Switzerland) Martina Hingis [2]

==== Withdrawn players ====
Rank	Player	Points before	Points defending	New points	Reason
11	(France) Nathalie Tauziat	2,195	0	2,195	

== Wildcard entries ==
=== Men's singles wildcard entries ===
1. (Australia) Wayne Arthurs
2. (Australia) Mark Draper
3. (Australia) Lleyton Hewitt
4. (Australia) Toby Mitchell
5. (Australia) Joseph Sirianni
6. (Australia) Sandon Stolle
7. (Japan) Takao Suzuki
8. (Australia) Michael Tebbutt

=== Women's singles wildcard entries ===
1. (Australia) Catherine Barclay
2. (Australia) Jelena Dokić
3. (Australia) Evie Dominikovic
4. (Australia) Annabel Ellwood
5. (Australia) Rachel McQuillan
6. (Australia) Alicia Molik
7. (South Korea) Park Sung-hee
8. (Australia) Cindy Watson

=== Men's doubles wildcard entries ===
1. (Australia) Grant Doyle / (Australia) Ben Ellwood
2. (Australia) Scott Draper / (Australia) Lleyton Hewitt
3. (Australia) Paul Hanley / (Australia) Nathan Healey
4. (Australia) Toby Mitchell / (Australia) Andrew Painter
5. (Australia) Dejan Petrovic / (Australia) Grant Silcock

=== Women's doubles wildcard entries ===
1. (Sweden) Åsa Carlsson / (Australia) Jelena Dokić
2. (Australia) Evie Dominikovic / (Australia) Cindy Watson
3. (Australia) Amanda Grahame / (Australia) Bryanne Stewart
4. (United States) Meilen Tu / (Germany) Marlene Weingärtner

=== Mixed doubles wildcard entries ===
1. (Australia) Jelena Dokić / (Australia) Michael Tebbutt
2. (Australia) Lisa McShea / (Australia) Todd Woodbridge
3. (United States) Serena Williams / (Belarus) Max Mirnyi

== Qualifiers entries ==
=== Men's singles ===
1. (Germany) Rainer Schüttler
2. (Belarus) Vladimir Voltchkov
3. (United States) Paul Goldstein
4. (South Africa) Justin Bower
5. (Germany) Edwin Kempes
6. (Spain) Javier Sánchez
7. (Germany) Lars Burgsmüller
8. (France) Stéphane Huet
9. (United States) Cecil Mamiit
10. (Sweden) Fredrik Jonsson
11. (Brazil) Márcio Carlsson
12. (Russia) Andrei Cherkasov
13. (South Africa) Marcos Ondruska
14. (Austria) Markus Hipfl
15. (United States) David Caldwell
16. (Czech Republic) Petr Luxa

==== Lucky losers ====
1. (Germany) Bernd Karbacher
2. (Spain) Óscar Serrano

=== Women's singles ===
1. (Russia) Nadia Petrova
2. (United States) Jill Craybas
3. (Canada) Maureen Drake
4. (Czech Republic) Lenka Němečková
5. (United States) Erika deLone
6. (Slovenia) Tina Križan
7. (Czech Republic) Sandra Kleinová
8. (Russia) Elena Dementieva

== Prize money ==
Event		W	F	SF	QF	4R	3R	2R	1R
Singles	Men	A$722,000	A$361,000	A$180,000	A$92,500	A$49,500	A$28,250	A$17,250	A$11,125
Singles	Women	A$679,000	A$339,500	A$169,000	A$87,000	A$46,500	A$26,750	A$16,250	A$10,400

Total prize money for the event was A$11,008,700.

Preceded by 1998 US Open	Grand Slams	Succeeded by 1999 French Open
