= Kirstin Freye =

German tennis player

- Country (sports): Germany
- Born: 29 May 1975 (age 49); Herford, Germany
- Turned pro: 1990
- Retired: 2006
- Prize money: $203,729

Singles
- Career record: 181–241
- Career titles: 0
- Highest ranking: No. 198 (15 November 1993)

Doubles
- Career record: 246–192
- Career titles: 0 WTA, 22 ITF
- Highest ranking: No. 88 (27 January 2003)

Grand Slam doubles results
- Australian Open: 3R (2003)
- French Open: 2R (2001)
- Wimbledon: 2R (1997)
- US Open: 1R (1997, 1998, 2003)

Kirstin Freye-Menzler (born 29 May 1975 in Herford) is a former German professional tennis player.

She took part in the 2002 Al Habtoor Tennis Challenge and was the champion in doubles. Freye-Menzler has never won a singles event but she has won 22 doubles titles on the ITF circuit. In addition, she played doubles on the WTA Tour, reaching the last 16 of the 2003 Australian Open (her best result at a Grand Slam), and the semifinals in Quebec City in 2002 (her best result on the WTA Tour).

== ITF finals ==
$100,000 tournaments
$75,000 tournaments
$50,000 tournaments
$25,000 tournaments
$10,000 tournaments

=== Singles (0–3) ===
| Result | No. | Date | Location | Surface | Opponent | Score |
|---|---|---|---|---|---|---|
| Loss | 1. | 7 June 1993 | Ashkelon, Israel | Hard | (Israel) Yael Segal | 6–0, 5–7, 2–6 |
| Loss | 2. | 2 February 1997 | Rungsted, Denmark | Carpet (i) | (Czech Republic) Magdalena Zděnovcová | 6–7, 6–7 |
| Loss | 3. | 15 October 2000 | Mexico City, Mexico | Hard | (United States) Sarah Taylor | 1–4, 2–4, 5–3, 2–4 |

=== Doubles (22–19) ===
| Result | No. | Date | Location | Surface | Partner | Opponents | Score |
|---|---|---|---|---|---|---|---|
| Win | 1. | 26 November 1990 | Ljusdal, Sweden | Hard (i) | (Germany) Stefanie Rehmke | (Germany) Cora Linneman (Sweden) Eva Lena Olsson | 6–1, 7–5 |
| Loss | 2. | 24 July 1994 | Rheda-Wiedenbrück, Germany | Clay | (Germany) Angela Kerek | (Netherlands) Seda Noorlander (Netherlands) Annemarie Mikkers | 3–6, 2–6 |
| Loss | 3. | 17 October 1994 | Flensburg, Germany | Carpet (i) | (Germany) Silke Meier | (Czech Republic) Kateřina Šišková (Czech Republic) Jana Pospíšilová | 2–6, 6–4, 2–6 |
| Win | 4. | 10 July 1995 | Vigo, Spain | Clay | (Romania) Andreea Ehritt | (Spain) Estefanía Bottini (Spain) Gala León García | 2–6, 6–3, 6–3 |
| Loss | 5. | 31 July 1995 | Mississauga, Canada | Hard | (Netherlands) Anique Snijders | (Canada) Rene Simpson (Canada) Caroline Delisle | 3–6, 2–6 |
| Loss | 6. | 4 September 1995 | Tianjin, China | Hard | (South Africa) Tessa Price | (China) Chen Li-Ling (China) Li Fang | 2–6, 3–6 |
| Win | 7. | 29 October 1995 | Poitiers, France | Hard (i) | (Netherlands) Seda Noorlander | (Netherlands) Kim de Weille (Netherlands) Nathalie Thijssen | 6–4, 6–4 |
| Win | 8. | 28 July 1996 | Buenos Aires, Argentina | Clay | (Germany) Caroline Schneider | (Argentina) María Fernanda Landa (Paraguay) Larissa Schaerer | 7–6^{(7–4)}, 6–4 |
| Loss | 9. | 11 August 1996 | Sopot, Poland | Clay | (Germany) Silke Meier | (Czech Republic) Lenka Němečková (Czech Republic) Helena Vildová | 0–6, 0–6 |
| Win | 10. | 6 October 1996 | Lerida, Spain | Clay | (Austria) Barbara Schwartz | (Netherlands) Amanda Hopmans (Belgium) Patty Van Acker | 6–2, 6–1 |
| Win | 11. | 10 November 1996 | Ramat Hasharon, Israel | Hard | (Netherlands) Seda Noorlander | (Netherlands) Anique Snijders (France) Noëlle van Lottum | 6–2, 7–5 |
| Loss | 12. | 17 November 1996 | Bad Gögging, Germany | Carpet (i) | (Germany) Silke Meier | (India) Nirupama Sanjeev (Austria) Barbara Schwartz | 4–6, 1–6 |
| Loss | 13. | 8 December 1996 | Cergy, France | Hard (i) | (France) Noëlle van Lottum | (United States) Angela Lettiere (United States) Meilen Tu | 4–6, 6–2, 4–6 |
| Loss | 14. | 2 March 1997 | Bushey, Great Britain | Carpet (i) | (Ukraine) Elena Tatarkova | (Ukraine) Olga Lugina (United Kingdom) Clare Wood | 6–7^{(6–8)}, 7–6^{(8–6)}, 1–6 |
| Win | 15. | 13 July 1997 | Puchheim, Germany | Clay | (France) Noëlle van Lottum | (Argentina) María Fernanda Landa (Netherlands) Seda Noorlander | 6–1, 6–2 |
| Loss | 16. | 19 October 1997 | Flensburg, Germany | Carpet (i) | (Hungary) Virág Csurgó | (Austria) Patricia Wartusch (Germany) Jasmin Wöhr | 3–6, 6–3, 3–6 |
| Win | 17. | 27 October 1997 | Ramat Hasharon, Israel | Hard | (Israel) Hila Rosen | (Slovenia) Petra Rampre (Slovenia) Katarina Srebotnik | 6–1, 6–1 |
| Loss | 18. | 9 November 1997 | Moulins, France | Hard (i) | (United States) Kelly Pace | (Austria) Melanie Schnell (United States) Julie Steven | 1–6, 2–4 ret. |
| Win | 19. | 21 December 1997 | Cascais, Portugal | Carpet (i) | (Poland) Anna Bieleń-Żarska | (Germany) Angelika Bachmann (Romania) Magda Mihalache | 6–7, 6–0, 6–4 |
| Win | 20. | 14 February 1998 | Birmingham, Great Britain | Hard (i) | (United States) Jean Okada | (Netherlands) Henriëtte van Aalderen (Netherlands) Andrea van den Hurk | 6–4, 6–4 |
| Loss | 21. | 21 February 1998 | Redbridge, Great Britain | Hard (i) | (Israel) Hila Rosen | (Hungary) Virág Csurgó (Ukraine) Elena Tatarkova | 5–7, 3–6 |
| Loss | 22. | 1 March 1998 | Bushey, Great Britain | Carpet (i) | (France) Noëlle van Lottum | (Australia) Trudi Musgrave (United Kingdom) Shirli-Ann Siddall | 6–7, 6–4, 2–6 |
| Win | 23. | 15 March 1998 | Biel, Switzerland | Hard (i) | (France) Noëlle van Lottum | (Belgium) Nancy Feber (Slovenia) Tina Križan | 6–3, 3–6, 7–6^{(7–4)} |
| Loss | 24. | 26 April 1998 | Espinho, Portugal | Carpet (i) | (Germany) Silke Meier | (Netherlands) Kim de Weille (France) Noëlle van Lottum | 6–4, 3–6, 5–7 |
| Win | 25. | 21 June 1998 | Biel, Switzerland | Clay | (United States) Jean Okada | (Switzerland) Laura Bao (France) Samantha Schoeffel | 6–0, 6–7, 6–1 |
| Win | 26. | 26 July 1998 | Dublin, Ireland | Hard | (Spain) Alicia Ortuño | (Australia) Lisa McShea (Australia) Trudi Musgrave | w/o |
| Win | 27. | 18 October 1998 | Seoul, South Korea | Hard | (Japan) Shinobu Asagoe | (Australia) Catherine Barclay (South Korea) Choi Young-ja | 6–2, 7–6 |
| Loss | 28. | 21 February 1999 | Midland, United States | Hard (i) | (Canada) Sonya Jeyaseelan | (South Africa) Liezel Horn (United Kingdom) Samantha Smith | 6–7, 6–0, 5–7 |
| Win | 29. | 20 June 1999 | Istanbul, Turkey | Hard | (Italy) Giulia Casoni | (Slovakia) Andrea Šebová (Czech Republic) Magdalena Zděnovcová | 6–3, 6–3 |
| Loss | 30. | 11 July 1999 | Edmonton, Canada | Hard | (Canada) Renata Kolbovic | (United States) Dawn Buth (Canada) Vanessa Webb | 3–6, 2–6 |
| Loss | 31. | 18 July 1999 | Puchheim, Germany | Clay | (Germany) Syna Schmidle | (Bulgaria) Svetlana Krivencheva (Czech Republic) Eva Melicharová | 2–6, 4–6 |
| Win | 32. | 28 May 2000 | Biella, Italy | Clay | (Hungary) Adrienn Hegedűs | (Slovakia) Eva Fislová (Czech Republic) Zuzana Hejdová | 6–2, 6–4 |
| Loss | 33. | 16 July 2000 | Winnipeg, Canada | Hard | (Hong Kong) Tong Ka-po | (Canada) Renata Kolbovic (Canada) Vanessa Webb | 1–6, 4–6 |
| Win | 34. | 30 September 2000 | Santa Clara, United States | Hard | (Netherlands) Seda Noorlander | (United States) Dawn Buth (Slovenia) Petra Rampre | 6–1, 6–4 |
| Loss | 35. | 14 October 2000 | Mexico City, Mexico | Hard | (Republic of Ireland) Kelly Liggan | (Brazil) Joana Cortez (Brazil) Vanessa Menga | 3–5, 4–5^{(4–6)}, 0–4 |
| Loss | 36. | 11 November 2000 | Pittsburgh, United States | Hard (i) | (Netherlands) Seda Noorlander | (India) Nirupama Sanjeev (Japan) Nana Smith | 7–5, 4–6, 0–6 |
| Win | 37. | 24 June 2001 | Lenzerheide, Switzerland | Clay | (Slovakia) Zuzana Váleková | (Argentina) Erica Krauth (Argentina) Vanesa Krauth | 3–6, 6–3, 6–2 |
| Win | 38. | 29 July 2001 | Les Contamines, France | Hard | (Netherlands) Anousjka van Exel | (France) Caroline Dhenin (Australia) Rochelle Rosenfield | 6–3, 6–2 |
| Win | 39. | 2 February 2002 | Belfort, France | Hard (i) | (Germany) Syna Schmidle | (France) Marina Caiazzo (France) Sophie Lefèvre | 7–6^{(7–0)}, 6–4 |
| Win | 40. | 6 April 2002 | Dubai, United Arab Emirates | Hard | (Netherlands) Seda Noorlander | (Morocco) Bahia Mouhtassine (Indonesia) Angelique Widjaja | 6–2, 6–4 |
| Win | 41. | 14 July 2002 | Darmstadt, Germany | Clay | (Germany) Andrea Glass | (Czech Republic) Eva Birnerová (Czech Republic) Dominika Luzarová | 7–5, 6–2 |
