= Kateřina Sisková =

Czech tennis player

- Country (sports): Czech Republic
- Born: 20 February 1974 (age 52) Czechoslovakia
- Turned pro: 1989
- Retired: 2013
- Prize money: $217,693

Singles
- Career record: 133–95
- Career titles: 8 ITF
- Highest ranking: 58 (4 January 1993)

Grand Slam singles results
- Australian Open: 1R (1995)
- French Open: 3R (1993)
- Wimbledon: 2R (1993)
- US Open: 1R (1992, 1993)

Doubles
- Career record: 122–75
- Career titles: 12 ITF
- Highest ranking: 104 (7 August 1995)

Grand Slam doubles results
- Australian Open: 2R (1997)
- French Open: 1R (1995)

Kateřina Sisková (Kateřina Kroupová, born 20 February 1974) is a former professional Czech tennis player.

In her career she won eight singles and 12 doubles titles on the ITF circuit. On 4 January 1993, she reached her best singles ranking of world number 58. On 7 August 1995, she peaked at number 104 in the WTA doubles rankings.

Her daughter Anna Sisková is also a professional tennis player.

== WTA career finals ==
=== Doubles (0–1) ===
Winner - Legend
Grand Slam tournaments (0–0)
Tier I (0–0)
Tier II (0–0)
Tier III (0–0)
Tier IV & V (0–1)

| Result | Date | Tournament | Surface | Partner | Opponents | Score |
|---|---|---|---|---|---|---|
| Loss | Aug 1996 | WTA Austrian Open, Linz | Clay | (Czech Republic) Lenka Cenková | (Ukraine) Natalia Medvedeva (Slovakia) Janette Husárová | 4–6, 5–7 |

== ITF finals ==
$100,000 tournaments
$75,000 tournaments
$50,000 tournaments
$25,000 tournaments
$10,000 tournaments

=== Singles (8–3) ===
| Result | No. | Date | Tournament | Surface | Opponent | Score |
|---|---|---|---|---|---|---|
| Win | 1. | 30 June 1991 | Dubrovnik, Yugoslavia | Clay | (Bulgaria) Lubomira Bacheva | 6–2, 6–1 |
| Loss | 2. | 7 July 1991 | Dubrovnik, Yugoslavia | Clay | (Bulgaria) Lubomira Bacheva | 4–6, 6–1, 2–6 |
| Win | 3. | 12 August 1991 | Rebecq, Belgium | Clay | (Russia) Elena Makarova | 6–3, 6–0 |
| Win | 4. | 6 April 1992 | Caserta, Italy | Clay | (Czechoslovakia) Radka Bobková | 6–4, 6–2 |
| Win | 5. | 13 April 1992 | Salerno, Italy | Clay | (Spain) Noelia Pérez Peñate | 6–2, 6–3 |
| Win | 6. | 12 September 1994 | Sofia, Bulgaria | Clay | (Portugal) Sofia Prazeres | 6–3, 6–3 |
| Loss | 7. | 17 June 1996 | Bytom, Poland | Clay | (Colombia) Fabiola Zuluaga | 6–3, 3–6, 6–7 |
| Win | 8. | 21 April 1997 | Prostějov, Czech Republic | Clay | (Czech Republic) Libuše Průšová | 0–6, 6–2, 6–1 |
| Win | 9. | 16 June 1997 | Doksy, Czech Republic | Clay | (Czech Republic) Milena Nekvapilová | 6–3, 3–6, 7–6^{(3)} |
| Loss | 10. | 29 June 1997 | Plzeň, Czech Republic | Clay | (Czech Republic) Michaela Paštiková | 2–6, 7–6, 4–6 |
| Win | 11. | 18 August 1997 | Valašské Meziříčí, Czech Republic | Clay | (Czech Republic) Libuše Průšová | 6–2, 6–1 |

=== Doubles (12–12) ===
| Result | No. | Date | Tournament | Surface | Partner | Opponents | Score |
|---|---|---|---|---|---|---|---|
| Win | 1. | 18 September 1989 | Rabac, Yugoslavia | Clay | (Soviet Union) Agnese Blumberga | (Czechoslovakia) Ivana Jankovská (Czechoslovakia) Eva Melicharová | 6–1, 6–4 |
| Loss | 2. | 13 August 1990 | Karlovy Vary, Czechoslovakia | Clay | (Czechoslovakia) Markéta Štusková | (Czechoslovakia) Petra Holubová (Czechoslovakia) Sylvia Štefková | 6–4, 4–6, 6–7 |
| Win | 3. | 24 June 1991 | Dubrovnik, Yugoslavia | Clay | (Czechoslovakia) Dominika Gorecká | (Slovenia) Karin Lušnic (Czechoslovakia) Katarína Studeníková | 6–4, 6–4 |
| Loss | 4. | 15 July 1991 | Karlovy Vary, Czechoslovakia | Clay | (Czechoslovakia) Markéta Štusková | (Czechoslovakia) Radka Bobková (Czechoslovakia) Karina Habšudová | 1–6, 3–6 |
| Loss | 5. | 16 September 1991 | Sofia, Bulgaria | Clay | (Czechoslovakia) Ivana Havrlíková | (Germany) Meike Babel (United Kingdom) Valda Lake | 5–7, 0–6 |
| Win | 6. | 30 March 1992 | Moncalieri, Italy | Clay | (Russia) Elena Makarova | (Czechoslovakia) Radka Bobková (Czechoslovakia) Jana Pospíšilová | 6–4, 2–6, 6–2 |
| Loss | 7. | 20 April 1992 | Bari, Italy | Clay | (Czechoslovakia) Eva Martincová | (Australia) Justine Hodder (Australia) Kirrily Sharpe | 2–6, 3–6 |
| Loss | 8. | 14 September 1992 | Karlovy Vary, Czech Republic | Clay | (Czechoslovakia) Jana Pospíšilová | (Sweden) Maria Lindström (Sweden) Maria Strandlund | 1–6, 2–6 |
| Loss | 9. | 27 September 1993 | Kirchheim, Austria | Clay | (Czech Republic) Petra Kučová | (Czech Republic) Ivana Jankovská (Czech Republic) Eva Melicharová | 1–6, 7–6, 1–6 |
| Loss | 10. | 27 June 1994 | Plovdiv, Bulgaria | Clay | (Czech Republic) Lenka Němečková | (Finland) Nanne Dahlman (Slovakia) Janette Husárová | 4–6, 4–6 |
| Loss | 11. | 12 September 1994 | Sofia, Bulgaria | Clay | (Czech Republic) Petra Kučová | (Germany) Caroline Schneider (Poland) Katharzyna Teodorowicz | 1–6, 1–6 |
| Win | 12. | 17 October 1994 | Flensburg, Germany | Carpet | (Czech Republic) Jana Pospíšilová | (Germany) Kirstin Freye (Germany) Silke Meier | 6–2, 4–6, 6–2 |
| Loss | 13. | 20 November 1994 | Bad Gögging, Germany | Carpet (i) | (Czech Republic) Jana Pospíšilová | (Romania) Cătălina Cristea (Serbia and Montenegro) Tatjana Ječmenica | 6–3, 3–6, 2–6 |
| Loss | 14. | 11 December 1994 | Cergy-Pontoise, France | Hard (i) | (Czech Republic) Eva Melicharová | (France) Angelique Olivier (Bulgaria) Elena Pampoulova | 1–6, 4–6 |
| Win | 15. | 20 February 1995 | Valencia, Spain | Clay | (Czech Republic) Petra Kučová | (Spain) Estefanía Bottini (Spain) Ángeles Montolio | 4–6, 6–3, 7–5 |
| Loss | 16. | 25 February 1996 | Bogotá, Colombia | Clay | (Hungary) Virág Csurgó | (Greece) Christína Papadáki (Argentina) Mercedes Paz | 6–7, 2–6 |
| Win | 17. | 9 December 1996 | Přerov, Czech Republic | Carpet | (Czech Republic) Eva Melicharová | (Czech Republic) Milena Nekvapilová (Czech Republic) Hana Šromová | 6–2, 7–6^{(5)} |
| Win | 18. | 8 June 1997 | Bytom, Poland | Clay | (Czech Republic) Jana Ondrouchová | (Poland) Katarzyna Teodorowicz (Poland) Anna Bieleń-Żarska | 6–4, 6–2 |
| Loss | 19. | 16 June 1997 | Doksy, Czech Republic | Clay | (Czech Republic) Jana Ondrouchová | (Czech Republic) Gabriela Chmelinová (Czech Republic) Jana Matsurová | 2–6, 2–6 |
| Win | 20. | 18 August 1997 | Valašské Meziříčí, Czech Republic | Clay | (Czech Republic) Jana Ondrouchová | (Czech Republic) Blanka Kumbárová (Czech Republic) Petra Plačková | 5–7, 7–6^{(6)}, 7–6^{(2)} |
| Win | 21. | 25 August 1997 | Orbetello, Italy | Clay | (Germany) Silke Meier | (Netherlands) Kim de Weille (Netherlands) Henriëtte van Aalderen | 6–3, 2–6, 6–2 |
| Win | 22. | 1 September 1997 | Spoleto, Italy | Clay | (Czech Republic) Jana Pospíšilová | (Spain) Ana Alcázar (Spain) Eva Bes | 6–1, 6–0 |
| Win | 23. | 4 October 1997 | Otočec, Slovenia | Clay | (Czech Republic) Lenka Cenková | (Hungary) Petra Mandula (Hungary) Katalin Marosi | 7–5, 7–6^{(3)} |
| Win | 24. | 26 April 1998 | Prostějov, Czech Republic | Clay | (Czech Republic) Lenka Cenková | (Ukraine) Olga Lugina (Germany) Elena Wagner | 6–4, 4–6, 6–4 |

== Grand Slam performance timelines ==
Key
| W | F | SF | QF | #R | RR | Q# | DNQ | A | NH |

(W) winner; (F) finalist; (SF) semifinalist; (QF) quarterfinalist; (#R) rounds 4, 3, 2, 1; (RR) round-robin stage; (Q#) qualification round; (DNQ) did not qualify; (A) absent; (NH) not held; (SR) strike rate (events won / competed); (W–L) win–loss record.

=== Singles ===
| Tournament | 1992 | 1993 | 1994 | 1995 | W–L |
|---|---|---|---|---|---|
| Australian Open | A | A | A | 1R | 0–1 |
| French Open | A | 3R | 1R | Q1 | 2–2 |
| Wimbledon | 1R | 2R | A | A | 1–2 |
| US Open | 1R | 1R | A | A | 0–2 |
| Win–loss | 0–2 | 3–3 | 0–1 | 0–1 | 3–7 |

=== Doubles ===
| Tournament | 1995 | 1996 | 1997 | W–L |
|---|---|---|---|---|
| Australian Open | 1R | A | 2R | 1–2 |
| French Open | 1R | A | A | 0–1 |
| Wimbledon | A | A | A | 0–0 |
| US Open | A | A | A | 0–0 |
| Win–loss | 0–2 | 0–0 | 1–1 | 1–3 |
