= Jana Hlaváčková =

Czech tennis player

- Country (sports): Czech Republic
- Born: 22 May 1981 (age 45) Plzeň, Czechoslovakia
- Retired: 2006
- Prize money: $73,001

Singles
- Career record: 142–122
- Career titles: 5 ITF
- Highest ranking: No. 202 (25 June 2001)

Grand Slam singles results
- Australian Open: Q1 (2001)
- US Open: Q2 (2001)

Doubles
- Career record: 50–61
- Career titles: 1 ITF
- Highest ranking: No. 193 (14 June 2004)

Jana Hlaváčková (born 22 May 1981) is a former professional Czech tennis player. She won a total of six ITF titles in her career, and reached a doubles ranking high of world No. 193.

Her younger sister is the three-times Grand Slam champion Andrea Sestini Hlaváčková.

== ITF Circuit finals ==
$100,000 tournaments
$75,000 tournaments
$50,000 tournaments
$25,000 tournaments
$10,000 tournaments

=== Singles: 5 (5 titles) ===
Outcome	No.	Date	Tournament	Surface	Opponent	Score
Winner	1.	21 June 1998	ITF Staré Splavy, Czech Republic	Clay	(Czech Republic) Milena Nekvapilová	3–6, 6–2, 6–2
Winner	2.	1 August 1999	ITF Horb, Germany	Clay	(Czech Republic) Jitka Schönfeldová	6–4, 6–7, 6–1
Winner	3.	6 May 2001	ITF Cagnes-sur-Mer, France	Clay	(Germany) Sabine Klaschka	7–5, 6–4
Winner	4.	10 June 2001	ITF Galatina, Italy	Clay	(Italy) Maria Elena Camerin	1–6, 6–3, 6–2
Winner	5.	29 June 2003	ITF Båstad, Sweden	Clay	(Czech Republic) Lenka Němečková	6–4, 3–6, 6–0

=== Doubles: 6 (1 title, 5 runner-ups) ===
Outcome	No.	Date	Tournament	Surface	Partner	Opponents	Score
Runner-up	1.	3 March 2002	ITF New Delhi, India	Hard	(Czech Republic) Eva Birnerová	(South Korea) Choi Young-ja (South Korea) Kim Eun-ha	7–6^{(7–4)}, 4–6, 3–6
Runner-up	2.	15 June 2003	ITF Vaduz, Liechtenstein	Clay	(Czech Republic) Petra Cetkovská	(Hungary) Zsófia Gubacsi (Czech Republic) Zuzana Hejdová	4–6, 4–6
Winner	1.	28 June 2003	ITF Båstad, Sweden	Clay	(Czech Republic) Dominika Luzarová	(Germany) Vanessa Henke (Czech Republic) Lenka Němečková	7–5, 6–2
Runner-up	3.	12 October 2003	ITF Juárez, Mexico	Clay	(Czech Republic) Hana Šromová	(Spain) Lourdes Domínguez Lino (Spain) Nuria Llagostera Vives	4–6, 6–2, 6–3
Runner-up	4.	28 March 2004	ITF Elda, Spain	Clay	(Czech Republic) Andrea Hlaváčková	(Spain) Lourdes Domínguez Lino (Portugal) Frederica Piedade	w/o
Runner-up	5.	10 October 2004	ITF Juárez, Mexico	Clay	(Czech Republic) Andrea Hlaváčková	(Brazil) Carla Tiene (Brazil) Maria Fernanda Alves	4–6, 0–6
