= Markéta Štusková =

Czech tennis player

- Full name: Markéta Zeitler Štusková
- Country (sports): Czechoslovakia; Czech Republic
- Born: 9 April 1974 (age 50)
- Prize money: $12,412

Singles
- Career record: 34–29
- Career titles: 0
- Highest ranking: No. 368 (30 November 1992)

Doubles
- Career record: 50–30
- Career titles: 4 ITF
- Highest ranking: No. 158 (6 July 1992)

Markéta Zeitler Štusková (born 9 April 1974) is a Czech former professional tennis player.

Štusková, who comes from Rožnov pod Radhoštěm, made her only WTA Tour main-draw appearance in 1992, playing doubles at the Prague Open with Petra Holubová.

During her career she won four ITF doubles titles, including $25,000 tournaments in Vall d'Hebron and Sopot.

Now living in Austria, Štusková is the mother of amateur golfer Lea Zeitler, who represented Austria at the 2014 Summer Youth Olympics.

== ITF finals ==
$50,000 tournaments
$25,000 tournaments
$10,000 tournaments

=== Doubles: 11 (4–7) ===
Outcome	No.	Date	Tournament	Surface	Partner	Opponents	Score
Runner-up	1.	13 August 1990	Karlovy Vary, Czechoslovakia	Clay	(Czechoslovakia) Kateřina Kroupová	(Czechoslovakia) Petra Holubová (Czechoslovakia) Sylvia Štefková	6–4, 4–6, 6–7
Winner	1.	11 March 1991	Murcia, Spain	Hard	(Czechoslovakia) Petra Raclavská	(Netherlands) Eva Haslinghuis (Norway) Amy Jönsson	6–2, 7–5
Runner-up	2.	10 June 1991	Érd, Hungary	Clay	(Czechoslovakia) Petra Holubová	(Hungary) Virág Csurgó (Hungary) Andrea Temesvári	1–6, 5–7
Runner-up	3.	15 July 1991	Karlovy Vary, Czechoslovakia	Clay	(Czechoslovakia) Kateřina Kroupová	(Czechoslovakia) Radka Bobková (Czechoslovakia) Karina Habšudová	1–6, 3–6
Runner-up	4.	19 January 1992	Bamberg, Germany	Carpet	(Ukraine) Olga Lugina	(Commonwealth of Independent States) Elena Likhovtseva (Netherlands) Dorien Wamelink	6–4, 1–6, 2–6
Winner	2.	17 February 1992	Vall d'Hebron, Spain	Clay	(Czechoslovakia) Petra Holubová	(Netherlands) Gaby Coorengel (Netherlands) Amy van Buuren	5–7, 6–4, 6–2
Runner-up	5.	24 February 1992	Valencia, Spain	Clay	(Czechoslovakia) Petra Holubová	(Spain) Estefanía Bottini (Spain) Virginia Ruano Pascual	1–6, 2–6
Winner	3.	10 August 1992	Sopot, Poland	Clay	(Poland) Katarzyna Teodorowicz	(United States) Jessica Emmons (Sweden) Maria Strandlund	6–4, 6–2
Runner-up	6.	21 September 1992	Adriatic, Croatia	Clay	(Croatia) Petra Rihtarić	(Czechoslovakia) Ivana Havrlíková (Croatia) Maja Murić	6–3, 1–6, 2–6
Runner-up	7.	14 June 1993	Maribor, Slovenia	Clay	(Czech Republic) Alena Vašková	(Czech Republic) Martina Hautová (Czech Republic) Lenka Němečková	7–6^{(4)}, 1–6, 5–7
Winner	4.	20 November 1995	Le Havre, France	Clay	(Austria) Patricia Wartusch	(Federal Republic of Yugoslavia) Dragana Zarić (North Macedonia) Marina Lazarovska	6–4, 7–5
