= Sylvia Štefková =

Czech tennis player

- Country (sports): Czechoslovakia; Czech Republic
- Born: 9 March 1970 (age 55)
- Prize money: $33,729

Singles
- Career titles: 2 ITF
- Highest ranking: No. 275 (15 February 1993)

Doubles
- Career titles: 4 ITF
- Highest ranking: No. 165 (15 July 1991)

Sylvia Štefková (born 9 March 1970) is a Czech former professional tennis player. She is the mother of WTA Tour player Barbora Štefková.

Štefková competed on the professional tour from the late 1980s to early 1990s. All of her WTA Tour main draw appearances came in doubles, across 1993 and 1994. Her best performance came at Kitzbühel in 1993, where she and Eva Martincová upset second seeds Florencia Labat and Virginia Ruano Pascual to make the quarter-finals.

== ITF finals ==
$25,000 tournaments
$10,000 tournaments

=== Singles: 3 (2–1) ===
Result	No.	Date	Tournament	Surface	Opponent	Score
Win	1.	13 June 1988	Salerno, Italy	Clay	(Soviet Union) Eugenia Maniokova	7–5, 7–5
Win	2.	27 May 1991	Katowice, Poland	Clay	(Czechoslovakia) Petra Raclavská	6–2, 2–6, 7–6
Loss	1.	6 December 1993	Vítkovice, Czech Republic	Hard	(Czech Republic) Květa Peschke	4–6, 3–6

=== Doubles: 7 (4–3) ===
Result	No.	Date	Tournament	Surface	Partner	Opponents	Score
Win	1.	1 August 1988	Kitzbühel, Austria	Clay	(Czechoslovakia) Petra Holubová	(Australia) Tracey Morton (Australia) Lisa Weerasekera	7–6^{(4)}, 6–2
Loss	1.	19 March 1990	Ramat Hasharon, Israel	Hard	(Czechoslovakia) Petra Holubová	(South Africa) Robyn Field (South Africa) Michelle Anderson	3–6, 0–6
Win	2.	30 July 1990	Rheda-Wiedenbrück, West Germany	Clay	(Czechoslovakia) Petra Holubová	(Soviet Union) Viktoria Milvidskaia Belinsky (Soviet Union) Agnese Blumberga	6–4, 6–4
Win	3.	13 August 1990	Karlovy Vary, Czechoslovakia	Clay	(Czechoslovakia) Petra Holubová	(Czechoslovakia) Kateřina Kroupová-Šišková (Czechoslovakia) Markéta Štusková	4–6, 6–4, 7–6
Loss	2.	6 April 1992	Limoges, France	Carpet	(Bulgaria) Lubomira Bacheva	(Belgium) Els Callens (Switzerland) Michèle Strebel	6–4, 1–6, 4–6
Loss	3.	27 July 1992	Rheda-Wiedenbrück, Germany	Clay	(Czechoslovakia) Eva Martincová	(Czechoslovakia) Klára Bláhová (Czechoslovakia) Zdeňka Málková	6–7^{(5)}, 4–6
Win	4.	28 June 1993	Vaihingen, Germany	Clay	(Czech Republic) Eva Martincová	(Slovakia) Denisa Krajčovičová (Slovakia) Katarína Studeníková	6–1 ret.
