= Agnese Gustmane =

Soviet-Latvian tennis player

- Country (sports): Soviet Union; Latvia
- Born: 9 April 1971 (age 55) Latvian SSR, Soviet Union
- Turned pro: 1988
- Retired: 1999
- Plays: Right-handed (double-handed backhand)
- Prize money: US$51,953

Singles
- Career record: 85–71
- Career titles: 0 WTA, 2 ITF
- Highest ranking: No. 155 (6 May 1991)

Other tournaments
- Olympic Games: 2R (1992)

Doubles
- Career record: 75–46
- Career titles: 0 WTA, 8 ITF
- Highest ranking: No. 133 (17 September 1990)

Grand Slam doubles results
- French Open: 2R (1991)

Other doubles tournaments
- Olympic Games: 1R (1992)

Agnese Gustmane (née Blumberga, born 9 April 1971) is a retired professional tennis player who represented the Soviet Union and Latvia.

On 6 May 1991, Gustmane reached her best singles ranking of world number 155. On 17 September 1990, she peaked at world number 133 in the doubles rankings.

Playing for Latvia at the Fed Cup, Gustmane has accumulated a win–loss record of 17–12.

== ITF finals ==
=== Singles (2–2) ===
$100,000 tournaments
$75,000 tournaments
$50,000 tournaments
$25,000 tournaments
$10,000 tournaments

Result	No.	Date	Tournament	Surface	Opponent	Score
Win	1.	18 September 1989	Rabac, Yugoslavia	Clay	(Switzerland) Natalie Tschan	4–6, 7–5, 6–3
Loss	2.	9 July 1990	Erlangen, West Germany	Clay	(West Germany) Anouschka Popp	5–7, 6–3, 6–7
Win	3.	30 July 1990	Rheda-Wiedenbrück, West Germany	Clay	(West Germany) Katja Oeljeklaus	3–6, 6–4, 6–4
Loss	4.	20 April 1992	Bari, Italy	Clay	(Austria) Sandra Dopfer	2–6, 3–6

=== Doubles (8–4) ===
Result	No.	Date	Tournament	Surface	Partner	Opponents	Score
Win	1.	21 August 1989	Neumünster, West Germany	Clay	(Greece) Julia Apostoli	(Sweden) Catarina Bernstein (Sweden) Annika Narbe	6–1, 6–2
Win	2.	18 September 1989	Rabac, Yugoslavia	Clay	(Czechoslovakia) Kateřina Kroupová-Šišková	(Czechoslovakia) Ivana Jankovská (Czechoslovakia) Eva Melicharová	6–1, 6–4
Loss	3.	16 October 1989	Supetar, Yugoslavia	Clay	(Moldova) Svetlana Komleva	(Czechoslovakia) Ivana Jankovská (Czechoslovakia) Eva Melicharová	2–6, 3–6
Win	4.	27 November 1989	Budapest, Hungary	Carpet (i)	(West Germany) Tanja Hauschildt	(United Kingdom) Alexandra Niepel (West Germany) Caroline Schneider	6–3, 1–6, 6–1
Win	5.	15 April 1990	Bari, Italy	Clay	(West Germany) Barbara Rittner	(Indonesia) Yayuk Basuki (Indonesia) Suzanna Wibowo	6–4, 4–6, 6–2
Loss	6.	9 July 1990	Erlangen, West Germany	Clay	(Soviet Union) Eugenia Maniokova	(West Germany) Eva Pfaff (Hungary) Réka Szikszay	3–6, 1–6
Win	7.	16 July 1990	Darmstadt, West Germany	Clay	(Soviet Union) Eugenia Maniokova	(Netherlands) Simone Schilder (Argentina) Andrea Tiezzi	6–4, 6–4
Loss	8.	30 July 1990	Rheda-Wiedenbrück, West Germany	Clay	(Soviet Union) Viktoria Milvidskaia	(Czechoslovakia) Petra Holubová (Czechoslovakia) Sylvia Štefková	4–6, 4–6
Loss	9.	22 July 1991	Schwarzach, Austria	Clay	(Austria) Heidi Sprung	(Czechoslovakia) Karina Habšudová (Czechoslovakia) Katarína Studeníková	3–6, 1–6
Win	10.	29 March 1993	Moulins, France	Hard	(Czech Republic) Jana Pospíšilová	(France) Isabelle Demongeot (France) Catherine Suire	3–6, 6–2, 6–4
Win	11.	24 May 1993	Barcelona, Spain	Clay	(Poland) Katarzyna Teodorowicz	(Australia) Robyn Mawdsley (Australia) Shannon Peters	7–6^{(7–2)}, 6–2
Win	12.	18 October 1993	Flensburg, Germany	Carpet	(Russia) Eugenia Maniokova	(Germany) Tanja Karsten (Germany) Michaela Seibold	6–3, 6–1
