= Amy Jönsson Raaholt =

Norwegian tennis player

- Full name: Amy Elisabeth Jönsson Raaholt
- Country (sports): Norway
- Born: 8 June 1967 (age 58); Gothenburg, Sweden
- Prize money: $36,961

Singles
- Highest ranking: No. 174 (4 July 1988)

Grand Slam singles results
- Australian Open: 1R (1988)

Doubles
- Highest ranking: No. 217 (1 February 1988)

Grand Slam doubles results
- Australian Open: 2R (1988)

Amy Elisabeth Jönsson Raaholt (born 8 June 1967) is a former professional tennis player from Norway. She was born Amy Jönsson.

== Biography ==
Jönsson, who was born in the Swedish city of Gothenburg, debuted for the Norway Fed Cup team in 1985.

Her best performance on the WTA Tour came at Bastad in 1987 when she made the quarter-finals, a run which included a win over eighth seed Carina Karlsson.

At the 1988 Australian Open she featured in the women's singles and doubles draws. She was beaten in the first round of the singles by top seed Steffi Graf, who went on to win the title. In the doubles she and partner Helena Dahlström reached the second round.

Her last Fed Cup appearance came in 1995 and she finished with a 30/19 overall win–loss record, from a total of 28 ties. She holds the record for the most Fed Cup matches won for Norway, both in singles and doubles

She has a daughter, Andrea Raaholt, who plays tennis professionally.

== ITF finals ==
=== Singles: 6 (3–3) ===
Result	No.	Date	Tournament	Surface	Opponent	Score
Loss	1.	16 March 1987	Canberra, Australia	Hard	(New Zealand) Belinda Cordwell	3–6, 2–6
Loss	2.	13 February 1989	Hørsholm, Denmark	Carpet	(Denmark) Tine Scheuer-Larsen	0–6, 3–6
Win	3.	16 October 1989	Supetar, Yugoslavia	Clay	(Czechoslovakia) Jitka Dubcová	6–0, 4–6, 6–1
Win	4.	22 January 1990	Helsinki, Finland	Carpet	(France) Sylvie Sabas	4–6, 6–4, 6–3
Loss	5.	5 February 1990	Stavanger, Norway	Carpet	(West Germany) Barbara Rittner	3–6, 7–6, 6–4
Win	6.	18 March 1991	Alicante, Spain	Clay	(Spain) Rosa Bielsa	6–4, 7–5

=== Doubles: 4 (2–2) ===
Result	No.	Date	Tournament	Surface	Partner	Opponents	Score
Win	1.	21 September 1987	Llorca, Spain	Clay	(Hong Kong) Paulette Moreno	(Sweden) Maria Ekstrand (Sweden) Monica Lundqvist	7–6, 6–7, 7–5
Win	2.	21 January 1991	Bergen, Norway	Carpet (i)	(Poland) Magdalena Feistel	(Denmark) Merete Balling-Stockmann (Switzerland) Natalie Tschan	6–2, 6–2
Loss	3.	11 March 1991	Murcia, Spain	Clay	(Netherlands) Eva Haslinghuis	(Czechoslovakia) Petra Kučová (Czechoslovakia) Markéta Štusková	2–6, 5–7
Loss	4.	20 January 1992	Bergen, Norway	Carpet (i)	(Sweden) Cecilia Dahlman	(Sweden) Catarina Bernstein (Sweden) Annika Narbe	1–6, 4–6
