= Katarzyna Teodorowicz-Lisowska =

Polish tennis player

- Full name: Katarzyna Teodorowicz-Lisowska
- Country (sports): Poland
- Born: 28 November 1972 (age 53) Ruda Śląska, Poland
- Height: 176 cm (5 ft 9 in)
- Prize money: $65,080

Singles
- Highest ranking: No. 198 (16 May 1994)

Doubles
- Highest ranking: No. 111 (23 May 1994)

Grand Slam doubles results
- Australian Open: 1R (1993)
- French Open: 1R (1994)
Medal record
Representing Poland
Summer Universiade
Silver medal – second place	1997 Catania	Doubles
Silver medal – second place	1999 Palma de Mallorca	Doubles

Katarzyna Teodorowicz-Lisowska (born 28 November 1972) is a former professional tennis player from Poland. She was born Katarzyna Teodorowicz.

== Biography ==
Teodorowicz, who comes from Ruda Śląska in the south of Poland, played professionally in the 1990s.

She partnered with Magdalena Mroz to win Poland a Fed Cup tie against France in her first Fed Cup campaign in 1991, winning a live doubles rubber over Mary Pierce and Nathalie Tauziat. The same pair also won the decisive doubles match against Sweden in 1992 to put Poland into the World Group quarter-finals for the first time. They also teamed up together in the women's doubles at the 1992 Summer Olympics, losing in three sets to seventh seeded Argentines Mercedes Paz and Patricia Tarabini in the first round. In the 1993 Fed Cup, Poland were sent to the World Group playoffs after losing to Indonesia. They were able to win the playoff against Great Britain, with Teodorowicz teaming up again with Mroz to win the deciding doubles rubber.

At Grand Slam level she twice competed in the main draw of the women's doubles, at the 1993 Australian Open and 1994 French Open.

She studied at the University of Physical Education in Katowice and won silver medals in the women's doubles at the Summer Universiade in both 1997 and 1999.

Her last Fed Cup appearance came in 2000 and she retired having featured in a total of 22 ties for Poland.

== ITF Circuit finals ==
$50,000 tournaments
$25,000 tournaments
$10,000 tournaments

=== Singles: 2 (2–0) ===
Result	No.	Date	Tournament	Surface	Opponent	Score
Win	1.	24 May 1993	Barcelona, Spain	Clay	(Argentina) Maria Fernanda Landa	0–6, 6–3, 7–5
Win	2.	1 September 1997	Olsztyn, Poland	Clay	(Czech Republic) Petra Plačková	6–4, 6–1

=== Doubles: 27 (18–9) ===
Result	No.	Date	Tournament	Surface	Partner	Opponents	Score
Win	1.	1 October 1990	Šibenik, Yugoslavia	Clay	(Poland) Sylvia Czopek	(Czechoslovak Socialist Republic) Zdeňka Málková (Czechoslovak Socialist Republic) Eva Martincová	6–7, 7–6, 7–6
Win	2.	26 November 1990	Érd, Hungary	Clay	(Poland) Magdalena Feistel	(Czech Republic) Lucie Ludvigová (Czech Republic) Helena Vildová	5–7, 6–4, 6–2
Win	3.	27 May 1991	Katowice, Poland	Clay	(Poland) Magdalena Feistel	(Czech Republic) Dominika Gorecká (Czech Republic) Zuzana Witzová	6–0, 5–7, 6–1
Win	4.	12 August 1991	Rebecq, Belgium	Clay	(Poland) Agata Werblińska	(Netherlands) Seda Noorlander (Netherlands) Sandra van der Aa	6–2, 5–7, 6–2
Loss	1.	2 September 1991	Bad Nauheim, Germany	Clay	(Poland) Agata Werblińska	(Czechoslovakia) Hana Adámková (Germany) Eva-Maria Schürhoff	6–7, 2–6
Loss	2.	16 March 1992	Zaragoza, Spain	Clay	(Poland) Agata Werblińska	(Croatia) Maja Murić (Croatia) Petra Rihtarić	6–4, 4–6, 3–6
Win	5.	23 March 1992	Santander, Spain	Clay	(Poland) Agata Werblińska	(United Kingdom) Amanda Evans (Russia) Svetlana Parkhomenko	6–3, 6–3
Win	6.	18 May 1992	Tortosa, Spain	Clay	(Sweden) Maria-Farnes Capistrano	(Australia) Catherine Barclay (Canada) Martina Crha	4–6, 6–2, 7–5
Win	7.	10 August 1992	Sopot, Poland	Clay	(Czech Republic) Markéta Štusková	(United States) Jessica Emmons (Sweden) Maria Strandlund	6–4, 6–2
Loss	3.	28 September 1992	Salisbury, United States	Hard	(Poland) Magdalena Feistel	(United States) Beverly Bowes (United States) Tammy Whittington	5–7, 6–2, 0–6
Win	8.	19 October 1992	San Luis Potosí, Mexico	Hard	(Poland) Magdalena Feistel]	(Mexico) Isabela Petrov (United States) Jolene Watanabe	4–6, 6–4, 6–4
Win	9.	24 May 1993	Barcelona, Spain	Clay	(Latvia) Agnese Blumberga	(Australia) Robyn Mawdsley (Australia) Shannon Peters	7–6^{(7–2)}, 6–2
Win	10.	12 July 1993	Darmstadt, Germany	Clay	(Poland) Magdalena Feistel	(Italy) Laura Garrone (Slovenia) Tina Križan	4–6, 6–4, 7–5
Win	11.	1 November 1993	Vilamoura, Portugal	Hard	(Poland) Magdalena Feistel	(Spain) Gala León García (Spain) Ana Segura	7–6^{(7–1)}, 6–2
Win	12.	6 February 1994	Coburg, Germany	Carpet (i)	(Czech Republic) Helena Vildová	(Czech Republic) Ivana Jankovská (Czech Republic) Eva Melicharová	6–2, 7–6
Loss	4.	8 May 1994	San Luis Potosí, Mexico	Hard	(United States) Michelle Jackson-Nobrega	(South Africa) Liezel Horn (South Africa) Mariaan de Swardt	6–4, 3–6, 4–6
Win	13.	29 August 1994	Maribor, Slovenia	Clay	(Czech Republic) Helena Vildová	(Germany) Adriana Barna (Hungary) Andrea Noszály	7–5, 6–0
Win	14.	12 September 1994	Sofia, Bulgaria	Clay	(Germany) Caroline Schneider	(Czech Republic) Petra Kučová (Czech Republic) Kateřina Kroupová	6–1, 6–1
Loss	5.	27 February 1995	Prostějov, Czech Republic	Hard (i)	(Czech Republic) Eva Melicharová	(Switzerland) Martina Hingis (Czech Republic) Petra Langrová	6–7^{(4–7)}, 2–6
Win	15.	12 June 1995	Bytom, Poland	Clay	(Bulgaria) Teodora Nedeva	(Russia) Evgenia Kulikovskaya (Ukraine) Natalia Nemchinova	6–2, 6–2
Loss	6.	10 July 1995	Olsztyn, Poland	Clay	(Poland) Katarzyna Malec	(Ukraine) Natalia Nemchinova (Belarus) Marina Stets	2–6, 2–6
Win	16.	22 July 1996	Rostock, Germany	Clay	(Austria) Elisabeth Habeler	(Czech Republic) Denisa Chládková (Czech Republic) Eva Martincová	6–4, 4–6, 6–1
Loss	7.	20 October 1996	Šiauliai, Lithuania	Carpet (i)	(Poland) Anna Bieleń-Żarska	(Ukraine) Natalia Bondarenko (Belarus) Marina Stets	1–6, 4–6
Loss	8.	8 June 1997	Bytom, Poland	Clay	(Poland) Anna Bieleń-Żarska	(Czech Republic) Kateřina Kroupová-Šišková (Czech Republic) Jana Ondrouchová	4–6, 2–6
Win	17.	14 June 1998	Kędzierzyn-Koźle, Poland	Clay	(Poland) Anna Bieleń-Żarska	(Czech Republic) Milena Nekvapilová (Czech Republic) Hana Šromová	7–6, 6–1
Loss	9.	23 August 1998	Valašské Meziříčí, Czech Republic	Clay	(Poland) Anna Bieleń-Żarska	(Germany) Magdalena Kučerová (Czech Republic) Jana Rychlá	3–6, 6–4, 6–7
Win	18.	6 June 1999	Kędzierzyn-Koźle, Poland	Clay	(Poland) Anna Bieleń-Żarska	(Ukraine) Alona Bondarenko (Ukraine) Valeria Bondarenko	5–7, 6–4, 6–1
