= Petra Holubová =

Czech tennis player

- Country (sports): Czechoslovakia; Czech Republic
- Born: 12 October 1968 (age 57)
- Prize money: $47,855

Singles
- Career titles: 3 ITF
- Highest ranking: No. 132 (14 September 1992)

Grand Slam singles results
- US Open: Q2 (1992)

Doubles
- Career titles: 9 ITF
- Highest ranking: No. 160 (29 July 1991)

Petra Holubová (born 12 October 1968) is a Czech former professional tennis player.

Holubová, who reached a career-high ranking of 132 in the world, competed in the qualifying draw for the 1992 US Open.

Her best performances on the WTA Tour were round of 16 appearances at the Belgian Open and Palermo in 1992.

Holubová is mother of the German tennis player Julia Stusek.

== ITF finals ==
$25,000 tournaments
$10,000 tournaments

=== Singles: 7 (3–4) ===
Result	No.	Date	Tournament	Surface	Opponent	Score
Loss	1.	30 October 1989	ITF Pforzheim, West Germany	Hard (i)	(West Germany) Christina Singer	2–6, 6–7
Win	1.	12 February 1990	ITF Hørsholm, Denmark	Carpet (i)	(West Germany) Barbara Rittner	6–4, 6–2
Loss	2.	7 January 1991	ITF Bamberg, Germany	Carpet (i)	(Germany) Sabine Auer	6–7, 6–4, 4–6
Loss	3.	9 December 1991	ITF Érd, Hungary	Hard (i)	(Soviet Union) Elena Makarova	5–7, 1–6
Win	2.	13 January 1992	ITF Bamberg, Germany	Carpet (i)	(Germany) Christina Fischler	6–3, 4–6, 6–2
Win	3.	6 April 1992	ITF Limoges, France	Carpet (i)	(Austria) Beate Reinstadler	6–1, 7–5
Loss	4.	19 October 1992	ITF Moulins, France	Hard (i)	(Belgium) Els Callens	7–5, 2–6, 3–6

=== Doubles: 16 (9–7) ===
Result	No.	Date	Tournament	Surface	Partner	Opponents	Score
Win	1.	12 October 1987	ITF Mali Lošinj, Yugoslavia	Clay	(Czechoslovakia) Michaela Frimmelová	(Czechoslovakia) Denisa Krajčovičová (Czechoslovakia) Jana Pospíšilová	7–5, 4–6, 7–5
Win	2.	1 August 1988	ITF Kitzbühel, Austria	Clay	(Czechoslovakia) Sylvia Štefková	(Australia) Tracey Morton (Australia) Lisa Weerasekera	7–6^{(4)}, 6–2
Win	3.	8 August 1988	ITF Darmstadt, West Germany	Clay	(Czechoslovakia) Nora Bajčíková	(South Africa) Nelia Kruger (West Germany) Eva-Maria Schürhoff	5–7, 6–3, 6–3
Loss	1.	28 November 1988	ITF Budapest, Hungary	Carpet (i)	(Czechoslovakia) Nora Bajčíková	(Poland) Sylvia Czopek (Hungary) Antonia Homolya	6–7, 2–6
Loss	2.	24 April 1989	ITF Dubrovnik, Yugoslavia	Clay	(Czechoslovakia) Nora Bajčíková	(Hungary) Réka Szikszay (Hungary) Virág Csurgó	0–6, 0–1 ret.
Loss	3.	19 June 1989	ITF Madeira, Portugal	Hard	(Czechoslovakia) Alice Noháčová	(Netherlands) Ingelise Driehuis (United Kingdom) Alexandra Niepel	3–6, 1–6
Win	4.	17 July 1989	ITF Darmstadt, West Germany	Clay	(Czechoslovakia) Nora Bajčíková	(Sweden) Maria Ekstrand (Switzerland) Michèle Strebel	6–3, 6–2
Win	5.	31 July 1989	ITF Rheda, West Germany	Clay	(Czechoslovakia) Nora Bajčíková	(Australia) Danielle Jones (Australia) Lisa Keller	6–1, 6–2
Loss	4.	19 March 1990	ITF Ramat Hasharon, Israel	Hard	(Czechoslovakia) Sylvia Štefková	(South Africa) Robyn Field (South Africa) Michelle Anderson	3–6, 0–6
Win	6.	30 July 1990	ITF Rheda, West Germany	Clay	(Czechoslovakia) Sylvia Štefková	(Soviet Union) Viktoria Milvidskaia Belinsky (Soviet Union) Agnese Blumberga	6–4, 6–4
Win	7.	13 August 1990	ITF Karlovy Vary, Czechoslovakia	Clay	(Czechoslovakia) Sylvia Štefková	(Czechoslovakia) Kateřina Kroupová-Šišková (Czechoslovakia) Markéta Štusková	4–6, 6–4, 7–6
Loss	5.	10 June 1991	ITF Érd, Hungary	Clay	(Czechoslovakia) Markéta Štusková	(Hungary) Virág Csurgó (Hungary) Andrea Temesvári	1–6, 5–7
Win	8.	17 February 1992	ITF Vall d'Hebron, Spain	Clay	(Czechoslovakia) Markéta Štusková	(Netherlands) Gaby Coorengel (Netherlands) Amy van Buuren	5–7, 6–4, 6–2
Loss	6.	24 February 1992	ITF Valencia, Spain	Clay	(Czechoslovakia) Markéta Štusková	(Spain) Estefanía Bottini (Spain) Virginia Ruano Pascual	1–6, 2–6
Win	9.	26 July 1993	ITF Rheda, Germany	Clay	(Germany) Katja Oeljeklaus	(Netherlands) Gaby Coorengel (Netherlands) Amy van Buuren	7–5, 6–0
Loss	7.	20 September 1993	ITF Rabac, Croatia	Clay	(Czech Republic) Helena Vildová	(Czech Republic) Monika Kratochvílová (Czech Republic) Olga Hostáková	4–6, 4–6
