= Petra Raclavská =

Czech tennis player

- Full name: Petra Kučová Raclavská
- Country (sports): Czechoslovakia; Czech Republic
- Born: 26 February 1973 (age 53)
- Retired: 2001
- Prize money: $84,418

Singles
- Career record: 183–157
- Career titles: 6 ITF
- Highest ranking: No. 234 (20 March 2000)

Doubles
- Career record: 195–118
- Career titles: 22 ITF
- Highest ranking: No. 136 (14 August 1995)

Petra Kučová Raclavská (born 26 February 1973) is a Czech former professional tennis player. She competed as Petra Kučová before marriage.

Raclavská, who comes from Olomouc, reached the girls' doubles semifinals of both Wimbledon and the US Open in 1990.

On the professional tour, Raclavská was ranked as high as 234 in singles, and made the round of 16 at the 1992 Prague Open. As a doubles player, she had a best ranking of 136, with 22 ITF doubles titles.

== ITF Circuit finals ==
Legend
$100,000 tournaments
$75,000 tournaments
$50,000 tournaments
$25,000 tournaments
$10,000 tournaments

=== Singles: 11 (6–5) ===
Outcome	No.	Date	Tournament	Surface	Opponent	Score
Runner-up	1.	27 May 1991	ITF Katowice, Poland	Clay	(Czechoslovakia) Sylvia Štefková	2–6, 6–2, 6–7
Runner-up	2.	15 August 1994	ITF Bergisch Gladbach, Germany	Clay	(Czech Republic) Karolina Petříková	6–4, 2–6, 3–6
Winner	1.	303 June 1996	ITF Maribor, Slovenia	Clay	(Czech Republic) Hana Šromová	6–4, 4–6, 7–6
Winner	2.	25 August 1996	ITF Valašské Meziříčí, Czech Republic	Clay	(Slovakia) Zuzana Váleková	0–6, 6–3, 6–2
Runner-up	3.	12 April 1999	ITF Hvar, Croatia	Clay	(Bosnia and Herzegovina) Mervana Jugić-Salkić	4–6, 4–6
Winner	3.	19 April 1999	ITF Hvar, Croatia	Clay	(Bosnia and Herzegovina) Mervana Jugić-Salkić	7–5, 6–3
Winner	4.	2 August 1999	ITF Toruń, Poland	Clay	(New Zealand) Shelley Stephens	6–2, 6–4
Winner	5.	22 November 1999	ITF Mallorca, Spain	Clay	(Austria) Ursula Svetlik	4–6, 7–6^{(5)}, 6–2
Winner	6.	14 February 2000	ITF Pécs, Hungary	Clay	(Czech Republic) Klára Koukalová	6–4, 7–6^{(4)}
Runner-up	4.	10 July 2001	Bella Cup Toruń, Poland	Clay	(Czech Republic) Dominika Luzarová	6–2, 2–6, 0–6
Runner-up	5.	6 August 2001	ITF Kędzierzyn-Koźle, Poland	Clay	(Czech Republic) Pavlína Šlitrová	4–6, 1–6

=== Doubles: 35 (22–13) ===
Outcome	No.	Date	Tournament	Surface	Partner	Opponents	Score
Runner-up	1.	2 October 1989	ITF Šibenik, Yugoslavia	Clay	(Czechoslovakia) Radka Bobková	(Sweden) Helen Jonsson (Sweden) Malin Nilsson	5–7, 7–5, 4–6
Runner-up	2.	9 October 1989	ITF Bol, Yugoslavia	Clay	(Czechoslovakia) Radka Bobková	(Czechoslovakia) Ivana Jankovská (Czechoslovakia) Eva Melicharová	3–6, 6–3, 2–6
Winner	1.	11 March 1991	ITF Murcia, Spain	Hard	(Czechoslovakia) Markéta Štusková	(Netherlands) Eva Haslinghuis (Norway) Amy Jonsson	6–2, 7–5
Runner-up	3.	30 March 1992	Moulins, France	Clay	(Czechoslovakia) Eva Martincová	(Netherlands) Ingelise Driehuis (Netherlands) Simone Schilder	4–6, 5–7
Winner	2.	27 April 1992	Riccione, Italy	Clay	(Italy) Gabriella Boschiero	(Czechoslovakia) Monika Kratochvílová (Croatia) Maja Palaveršić	3–6, 6–3, 6–1
Runner-up	4.	6 June 1992	Velp, Netherlands	Clay	(United States) Tara Collins	(Netherlands) Linda Niemantsverdriet (Netherlands) Nicolette Rooimans	4–6, 1–6
Winner	3.	2 August 1993	Staré Splavy, Czech Republic	Clay	(Czech Republic) Monika Kratochvílová	(Czech Republic) Jindra Gabrisová (Czech Republic) Dominika Gorecká	4–6, 6–2, 7–5
Winner	4.	9 August 1993	Munich, Germany	Clay	(Czech Republic) Lenka Němečková	(Croatia) Ivona Horvat (Czech Republic) Martina Hautová	2–6, 6–3, 6–2
Runner-up	5.	27 September 1993	Kirchheim, Austria	Clay	(Czech Republic) Kateřina Šišková	(Czech Republic) Ivana Jankovská (Czech Republic) Eva Melicharová	1–6, 7–6, 1–6
Runner-up	6.	30 May 1994	Barcelona, Spain	Hard	(Switzerland) Emmanuelle Gagliardi	(Spain) Cristina Torrens Valero (Spain) Alicia Ortuño	6–3, 2–6, 2–6
Winner	5.	29 August 1994	Istanbul, Turkey	Hard	(Czech Republic) Lenka Němečková	(Netherlands) Carin Bakkum (Netherlands) Maaike Koutstaal	6–2, 6–3
Runner-up	7.	12 September 1994	Sofia, Bulgaria	Clay	(Czech Republic) Kateřina Šišková	(Germany) Caroline Schneider (Poland) Katharzyna Teodorowicz	1–6, 1–6
Winner	6.	20 February 1995	Valencia, Spain	Clay	(Czech Republic) Kateřina Šišková	(Spain) Estefanía Bottini (Spain) Ángeles Montolio	4–6, 6–3, 7–5
Runner-up	8.	19 June 1995	Staré Splavy, Czech Republic	Clay	(Czech Republic) Monika Kratochvílová	(Slovakia) Michaela Hasanová (Slovakia) Martina Nedelková	3–6, 7–5, 5–7
Winner	7.	31 July 1995	Sopot, Poland	Clay	(Czech Republic) Lenka Němečková	(Slovenia) Tina Križan (Slovenia) Katarína Studeníková	2–0 ret.
Winner	8.	7 October 1996	Nicosia, Cyprus	Clay	(Czech Republic) Blanka Kumbárová	(Hungary) Nóra Köves (Hungary) Andrea Noszály	7–5, 6–2
Runner-up	9.	23 June 1997	Plzeň, Czech Republic	Clay	(Czech Republic) Eva Krejčová	(Slovakia) Ľudmila Cervanová (Slovakia) Zuzana Váleková	7–5, 1–6, 2–6
Runner-up	10.	14 July 1997	Toruń, Poland	Clay	(Slovakia) Lenka Zacharová	(Czech Republic) Renata Kučerová (Slovakia) Martina Suchá	3–6, 3–6
Winner	9.	9 August 1998	Paderborn, Germany	Clay	(Czech Republic) Linda Faltynková	(Germany) Ester Brunn (Bulgaria) Desislava Topalova	6–3, 6–2
Winner	10.	28 August 1998	Supetar, Croatia	Clay	(Czech Republic) Olga Vymetálková	(Czech Republic) Blanka Kumbárová (Czech Republic) Renata Kučerová	6–1, 6–2
Runner-up	11.	12 April 1999	Hvar, Croatia	Clay	(Czech Republic) Gabriela Chmelinová	(Germany) Esther Brunn (Germany) Jasmin Halbauer	2–6, 3–6
Winner	11.	2 August 1999	Toruń, Poland	Clay	(Czech Republic) Gabriela Chmelinová	(Poland) Patrycja Bandurowska (Argentina) Vanesa Krauth	6–4, 6–3
Winner	12.	16 August 1999	Valašské Meziříčí, Czech Republic	Clay	(Czech Republic) Gabriela Chmelinová	(Czech Republic) Libuše Průšová (Poland) Anna Bieleń-Żarska	7–5, 2–6, 6–3
Winner	13.	22 November 1999	Mallorca, Spain	Clay	(Czech Republic) Gabriela Chmelinová	(Spain) Patricia Aznar (Spain) Yolanda Clemot	6–0, 6–3
Winner	14.	29 November 1999	Mallorca, Spain	Clay	(Czech Republic) Gabriela Chmelinová	(Spain) Beatriz Cabrera Rosendo (Sweden) Helena Ejeson	6–0, 7–5
Winner	15.	14 February 2000	Pécs, Hungary	Clay	(Czech Republic) Blanka Kumbárová	(Hungary) Kinga Berecz (Czech Republic) Zuzana Ondrášková	7–5, 6–2
Runner-up	12.	3 April 2000	Makarska, Croatia	Clay	(Czech Republic) Gabriela Chmelinová	(Germany) Inga Albers (Netherlands) Natasha Galouza	1–6, 2–6
Runner-up	13.	10 April 2000	Hvar, Croatia	Clay	(Czech Republic) Zuzana Hejdová	(Croatia) Marijana Kovačević (Italy) Mara Santangelo	3–6, 6–4, 3–6
Winner	16.	2 April 2001	Makarska, Croatia	Clay	(Czech Republic) Gabriela Chmelinová	(Czech Republic) Zuzana Hejdová (Bosnia and Herzegovina) Mervana Jugić-Salkić	1–6, 6–2, 6–3
Winner	17.	16 April 2001	Hvar, Croatia	Clay	(Czech Republic) Gabriela Chmelinová	(Netherlands) Natasha Galouza (Netherlands) Lotty Seelen	3–6, 6–1, 6–3
Winner	18.	30 April 2001	Nitra, Slovakia	Clay	(Czech Republic) Gabriela Chmelinová	(Slovakia) Kristína Michalaková (Slovakia) Katarína Kachlíková	6–4, 6–0
Winner	19.	10 July 2001	Toruń, Poland	Clay	(Czech Republic) Blanka Kumbárová	(Czech Republic) Gabriela Chmelinová (Czech Republic) Lenka Novotná	7–6^{(5)}, 6–3
Winner	20.	6 August 2001	ITF Kędzierzyn-Koźle, Poland	Clay	(Czech Republic) Blanka Kumbárová	(Ukraine) Alona Bondarenko (Ukraine) Valeria Bondarenko	6–1, 6–2
Winner	21.	19 August 2001	ITF Valašské Meziříčí, Czech Republic	Clay	(Czech Republic) Blanka Kumbárová	(Germany) Isabel Collischonn (Slovakia) Lenka Tvarošková	3–6, 7–5, 6–2
Winner	22.	15 October 2001	ITF Makarska, Croatia	Clay	(Czech Republic) Blanka Kumbárová	(Croatia) Ivana Abramović (Italy) Raffaella Bindi	6–4, 7–5
