= Estefanía Bottini =

Spanish tennis player (born 1974)

- Full name: Estefanía Bottini Alemany
- Country (sports): Spain
- Born: 3 February 1974 (age 51)
- Prize money: $58,297

Singles
- Highest ranking: No. 159 (30 March 1992)

Doubles
- Highest ranking: No. 141 (19 February 1996)

Grand Slam doubles results
- US Open: 2R (1995)

Estefanía Bottini Alemany (Note: In this Spanish name, the first or paternal surname is Bottini and the second or maternal family name is Alemany.) (born 3 February 1974), known as Estefanía Bottini, is a former professional tennis player from Spain.

== Biography ==
Bottini played on the professional tour in the 1990s, reaching a best singles ranking of 159 in the world.

Her best performances on the WTA Tour came in her home city of Barcelona, making the second round once, in 1991, then in 1992 taking world number 13 Nathalie Tauziat to three sets.

At the 1995 US Open she and Gala León García made the women's doubles main draw as lucky losers from qualifying and reached the second round.

== ITF finals ==
=== Singles (0–4) ===
$25,000 tournaments
$10,000 tournaments

Result	No.	Date	Tournament	Surface	Opponent	Score
Loss	1.	25 March 1991	Bilbao, Spain	Hard	(China) Li Fang	3–6, 1–6
Loss	2.	6 May 1991	Lerida, Spain	Clay	(France) Agnès Zugasti	6–4, 5–7, 2–6
Loss	3.	21 March 1994	Castellón, Spain	Clay	(France) Maïder Laval	4–6, 5–7
Loss	4.	10 July 1995	Vigo, Spain	Hard	(Spain) Gala León García	0–6, 1–6

=== Doubles (3–4) ===
Result	No.	Date	Tournament	Surface	Partner	Opponents	Score
Win	1.	24 February 1992	Valencia, Spain	Clay	(Spain) Virginia Ruano Pascual	(Czechoslovakia) Petra Holubová (Czechoslovakia) Markéta Štusková	6–1, 6–2
Loss	1.	6 April 1992	Caserta, Italy	Clay	(Spain) Virginia Ruano Pascual	(Czechoslovakia) Radka Bobková (Czechoslovakia) Jana Pospíšilová	3–6, 6–2, 6–7
Loss	2.	20 February 1995	Valencia, Spain	Clay	(Spain) Ángeles Montolio	(Czech Republic) Petra Raclavská (Czech Republic) Kateřina Šišková	6–4, 3–6, 5–7
Win	2.	27 March 1995	Reims, France	Clay (i)	(Spain) Gala León García	(France) Caroline Dhenin (Bulgaria) Svetlana Krivencheva	7–6, 1–6, 6–1
Loss	3.	15 May 1995	Tortosa, Spain	Clay	(Spain) Gala León García	(Czech Republic) Eva Melicharová (Czech Republic) Lenka Němečková	3–6, 6–7^{(5)}
Win	3.	22 May 1995	Barcelona, Spain	Clay	(Spain) Gala León García	(Argentina) Florencia Cianfagna (Argentina) Veronica Stele	7–5, 7–5
Loss	4.	10 July 1995	Vigo, Spain	Clay	(Spain) Gala León García	(Germany) Kirstin Freye (Romania) Andreea Ehritt	6–2, 3–6, 3–6
