= Eva Haslinghuis =

Dutch tennis player

- Country (sports): Netherlands
- Born: 21 July 1972 (age 53)
- Prize money: $16,568

Singles
- Career record: 56–44
- Career titles: 1 ITF
- Highest ranking: No. 284 (1 March 1993)

Doubles
- Career record: 37–26
- Career titles: 4 ITF
- Highest ranking: No. 215 (11 November 1991)

Eva Haslinghuis (born 21 July 1972) is a Dutch former professional tennis player.

Haslinghuis started on tour in the late 1990s and On 1 March 1993, she reached her highest WTA singles rankings of 284 and best doubles rankings of 215.

Her only WTA Tour main-draw appearance came at the 1992 Belgian Open where she partnered Esmir Hoogendoorn in the doubles event. They lost in the first round to Dutch Manon Bollegraf and Dutch Caroline Vis.

== ITF finals ==
=== Singles: 3 (1–2) ===
Result	No.	Date	Tournament	Surface	Opponent	Score
Loss	1.	25 November 1990	Ben Aknoun, Algeria	Clay	(France) Julie Foillard	6–7, 3–6
Win	2.	2 December 1990	Bachdjerrah, Algeria	Clay	(Republic of Ireland) Gina Niland	6–0, 7–6
Loss	3.	16 September 1991	Capua, Italy	Clay	(Romania) Andreea Ehritt-Vanc	2–6, 4–6

=== Doubles: 5 (4–1) ===
Result	No.	Date	Tournament	Surface	Partner	Opponents	Score
Win	1.	11 November 1990	Fes, Morocco	Clay	(Netherlands) Babette Eijsvogel	(Czechoslovakia) Nicole Strnadová (Czechoslovakia) Jana Strnadová	6–0, 2–6, 6–1
Win	2.	25 November 1990	Ben Aknoun, Algeria	Clay	(Netherlands) Babette Eijsvogel	(Netherlands) Yvonne Klompenhouver (Netherlands) Helma Leeuwen	6–2, 7–6
Win	3.	2 December 1990	Bachdjerrah, Algeria	Clay	(Netherlands) Babette Eijsvogel	(Netherlands) Yvonne Klompenhouver (Netherlands) Helma Leeuwen	6–2, 1–6, 7–5
Loss	4.	11 March 1991	Murcia, Spain	Clay	(Norway) Amy Jönsson Raaholt	(Czechoslovakia) Petra Kučová (Czechoslovakia) Markéta Štusková	2–6, 5–7
Win	5.	9 February 1992	Swansea, United Kingdom	Hard (i)	(Netherlands) Seda Noorlander	(Switzerland) Susanna Locher (United Kingdom) Alison Smith	6–3, 4–6, 6–4
