= Lenka Němečková =

Czech tennis player

- Country (sports): Czech Republic
- Born: 20 April 1976 (age 49) Brno, Czechoslovakia
- Height: 1.70 m (5 ft 7 in)
- Turned pro: 1994
- Retired: 2006
- Prize money: $533,966

Singles
- Career record: 326–284
- Career titles: 0 WTA, 3 ITF
- Highest ranking: No. 72 (12 January 1998)

Grand Slam singles results
- Australian Open: 1R (1998, 1999, 2000)
- French Open: 2R (2001)
- Wimbledon: 1R (1997, 1998)
- US Open: 1R (1998, 1999)

Doubles
- Career record: 207–170
- Career titles: 1 WTA, 16 ITF
- Highest ranking: No. 85 (28 April 1997)

Grand Slam doubles results
- Australian Open: 2R (1996, 1997)
- French Open: 2R (1999)
- Wimbledon: 1R (1997, 1999, 2002)
- US Open: 1R (1996,1997, 1999)

Lenka Němečková (born 20 April 1976) is a Czech former professional tennis player.

Němečková was born in Brno. She has a career-high WTA singles ranking of 72, achieved on 12 January 1998. She also has a career-high WTA doubles ranking of 85, achieved on 28 April 1997. Němečková won one doubles title on the WTA Tour and four singles and 16 doubles titles on the ITF Circuit.

Němečková (married Janoušková) retired from professional tennis in 2006.

== WTA Tour finals ==
Winner — Legend
Grand Slam
Premier M & Premier 5
Premier (0–0)
International (0–1)

=== Singles: 1 (runner-up) ===
Result	Date	Tournament	Surface	Opponent	Score
Loss	Sep 1997	Surabaya, Indonesia	Hard	(Belgium) Dominique Monami	1–6, 3–6

=== Doubles: 3 (1 title, 2 runner-ups) ===
Grand Slam
Premier M & Premier 5
Premier (0–0)
International (1–2)

Result	No.	Date	Tournament	Surface	Partner	Opponents	Score
Loss	1.	Apr 1997	Jakarta, Indonesia	Hard	(Japan) Yuka Yoshida	(Australia) Kerry-Anne Guse (Australia) Kristine Radford	4–6, 7–5, 5–7
Loss	2.	Jul 2001	Vienna, Austria	Clay	(Germany) Vanessa Henke	(Argentina) Paola Suárez (Argentina) Patricia Tarabini	4–6, 2–6
Win	1.	Oct 2001	Beijing, China	Hard	(South Africa) Liezel Huber	(Australia) Evie Dominikovic (Thailand) Tamarine Tanasugarn	6–0, 7–5

== ITF finals ==
$100,000 tournaments
$75,000 tournaments
$50,000 tournaments
$25,000 tournaments
$10,000 tournaments

=== Singles (3–10) ===
Result	No.	Date	Location	Surface	Opponent	Score
Loss	1.	22 March 1993	Madrid, Spain	Hard	(Spain) Gala León García	3–6, 4–6
Win	2.	14 June 1993	Maribor, Slovenia	Clay	(Czech Republic) Blanka Kumbárová	6–0, 6–2
Loss	3.	28 June 1993	Velp, Netherlands	Clay	(Netherlands) Yvette Basting	0–6, 5–7
Loss	4.	24 April 1995	Budapest, Hungary	Clay	(Hungary) Andrea Temesvári	4–6, 6–3, 4–6
Loss	5.	21 May 1995	Tortosa, Spain	Clay	(Argentina) Veronica Stele	2–6, 6–2, 4–6
Loss	6.	29 July 1996	Rostock, Germany	Clay	(Germany) Sandra Klösel	2–6, 6–7
Win	7.	22 September 1996	Sofia, Bulgaria	Clay	(Italy) Francesca Romano	6–2, 6–3
Loss	8.	23 February 1997	Bogotá, Colombia	Clay	(United States) Corina Morariu	2–6, 3–6
Loss	9.	24 September 2000	Lecce, Italy	Clay	(Croatia) Maja Palaveršić	2–6, 2–6
Loss	10.	4 August 2002	Brindisi, Italy	Clay	(Slovakia) Ľubomíra Kurhajcová	6–7^{(2–7)}, 0–6
Loss	11.	29 September 2002	Lecce, Italy	Clay	(Spain) Arantxa Parra Santonja	3–6, 4–6
Win	12.	28 April 2003	Maglie, Italy	Clay	(Croatia) Ivana Lisjak	5–7, 6–1, 7–6^{(7–5)}
Loss	13.	29 June 2003	Båstad, Sweden	Clay	(Czech Republic) Jana Hlaváčková	4–6, 6–3, 0–6

=== Doubles (16–15) ===
Result	No.	Date	Tournament	Surface	Partner	Opponents	Score
Win	1.	15 March 1993	Zaragoza, Spain	Hard	(Czech Republic) Dominika Gorecká	(Spain) Gala León García (Spain) Silvia Ramón-Cortés	6–4, 6–1
Win	2.	22 March 1993	Madrid, Spain	Clay	(Czech Republic) Dominika Gorecká	(Spain) Vanessa Castellano (Spain) Alicia Ortuño	6–4, 6–4
Win	3.	12 April 1993	Neudörfl, Austria	Clay	(Slovakia) Zuzana Nemšáková	(Czech Republic) Pavlína Rajzlová (Czech Republic) Ivana Havrlíková	4–6, 6–4, 6–2
Win	4.	14 June 1993	Maribor, Slovenia	Clay	(Czech Republic) Martina Hautová	(Czech Republic) Markéta Štusková (Czech Republic) Alena Vašková	6–7^{(4–7)}, 6–1, 7–5
Win	5.	28 June 1993	Velp, Netherlands	Clay	(Czech Republic) Martina Hautová	(Australia) Maija Avotins (Australia) Lisa McShea	7–5, 7–5
Win	6.	9 August 1993	Munich, Germany	Clay	(Czech Republic) Petra Raclavská	(Croatia) Ivona Horvat (Czech Republic) Martina Hautová	2–6, 6–3, 6–2
Win	7.	29 November 1993	Le Havre, France	Clay (i)	(Czech Republic) Ludmila Richterová	(Greece) Christína Papadáki (United States) Julie Steven	6–1, 7–6^{(7–2)}
Loss	8.	20 June 1994	Valladolid, Spain	Clay	(Netherlands) Hanneke Ketelaars	(Japan) Hiroko Mochizuki (Japan) Yuka Tanaka	0–6, 6–4, 2–6
Loss	9.	27 June 1994	Plovdiv, Bulgaria	Clay	(Czech Republic) Kateřina Kroupová-Šišková	(Finland) Nanne Dahlman (Slovakia) Janette Husárová	4–6, 4–6
Win	10.	29 August 1994	Istanbul, Turkey	Hard	(Czech Republic) Petra Raclavská	(Netherlands) Carin Bakkum (Netherlands) Maaike Koutstaal	6–2, 6–3
Win	11.	15 May 1995	Tortosa, Spain	Clay	(Czech Republic) Eva Melicharová	(Spain) Estefanía Bottini (Spain) Gala León García	6–3, 7–6^{(7–5)}
Loss	12.	3 July 1995	Sezze, Italy	Clay	(Germany) Maja Živec-Škulj	(Italy) Laura Garrone (Italy) Gloria Pizzichini	6–7^{(4–7)}, 2–6
Win	13.	31 July 1995	Sopot, Poland	Clay	(Czech Republic) Petra Raclavská	(Slovenia) Tina Križan (Slovenia) Katarína Studeníková	2–0 ret.
Loss	14.	23 June 1996	Bytom, Poland	Clay	(Czech Republic) Eva Martincová	(Czech Republic) Denisa Chládková (Czech Republic) Radka Pelikánová	6–7^{(0–7)}, 4–6
Win	15.	11 August 1996	Sopot, Poland	Clay	(Czech Republic) Helena Vildová	(Germany) Kirstin Freye (Germany) Silke Meier	6–0, 6–0
Win	16.	22 September 1996	Sofia, Bulgaria	Clay	(Argentina) Laura Montalvo	(Bulgaria) Teodora Nedeva (Bulgaria) Antoaneta Pandjerova	6–2, 6–0
Loss	17.	4 August 1997	Sopot, Poland	Clay	(Czech Republic) Radka Bobková	(Bulgaria) Svetlana Krivencheva (Ukraine) Elena Tatarkova	6–7^{(7–9)}, 3–6
Loss	18.	10 August 1998	Bratislava, Slovakia	Clay	(Slovakia) Katarína Studeníková	(Czech Republic) Milena Nekvapilová (Czech Republic) Hana Šromová	2–6, 4–6
Loss	19.	15 February 1999	Redbridge, United Kingdom	Hard (i)	(Austria) Patricia Wartusch	(Hungary) Nóra Köves (Serbia and Montenegro) Dragana Zarić	1–6, 4–6
Win	20.	28 March 1999	Atlanta, United States	Hard	(United States) Meilen Tu	(Australia) Catherine Barclay (United States) Katie Schlukebir	6-3, 6-3
Loss	21.	8 May 1999	Bratislava, Slovakia	Clay	(Slovakia) Radka Zrubáková	(Slovenia) Tina Križan (Slovenia) Katarina Srebotnik	1–6, 3–6
Loss	22.	20 June 1999	Marseille, France	Clay	(Czech Republic) Eva Martincová	(Spain) Gisela Riera (Romania) Raluca Sandu	4–6, 6–7
Loss	23.	4 August 2002	Brindisi, Italy	Clay	(Slovakia) Ľubomíra Kurhajcová	(Italy) Flavia Pennetta (Romania) Andreea Ehritt-Vanc	3–6, 2–6
Win	24.	16 September 2002	Luxembourg City, Luxembourg	Clay	(Czech Republic) Eva Martincová	(Slovakia) Eva Fislová (Slovakia) Ľubomíra Kurhajcová	6–1, 6–4
Loss	25.	29 June 2003	Båstad, Sweden	Clay	(Germany) Vanessa Henke	(Czech Republic) Jana Hlaváčková (Czech Republic) Dominika Luzarová	5–7, 2–6
Win	26.	14 July 2003	Garching bei München, Germany	Clay	(Germany) Angelika Bachmann	(Germany) Antonia Matic (Germany) Lydia Steinbach	6–2, 7–6^{(9–7)}
Loss	27.	21 September 2003	Biella, Italy	Clay	(Germany) Martina Müller	(Slovakia) Ľubomíra Kurhajcová (Czech Republic) Libuše Průšová	2–6, 4–6
Win	28.	17 February 2004	Columbus, United States	Hard (i)	(Slovakia) Stanislava Hrozenská	(New Zealand) Leanne Baker (Italy) Francesca Lubiani	7–6^{(7–3)}, 4–6, 6–3
Loss	29.	20 July 2004	Innsbruck, Austria	Clay	(Slovakia) Stanislava Hrozenská	(Ukraine) Alona Bondarenko (Russia) Galina Fokina	2–6, 4–6
Loss	30.	19 December 2004	Bergamo, Italy	Hard	(Germany) Julia Schruff	(Italy) Giulia Casoni (Italy) Francesca Lubiani	2-6, 3-6
Loss	31.	11 July 2005	Vittel, France	Clay	(Slovakia) Stanislava Hrozenská	(Czech Republic) Hana Šromová (Czech Republic) Renata Voráčová	4–6, 4–6
