= Katarína Studeníková =

Slovak tennis player

- Country (sports): Czechoslovakia; Slovakia
- Born: 2 September 1972 (age 52); Bratislava, Czechoslovakia
- Height: 1.72 m (5 ft 7 1/2 in)
- Turned pro: 1992
- Retired: 1999
- Plays: Right-handed
- Prize money: $594,039

Singles
- Career record: 202–159
- Career titles: 7 ITF
- Highest ranking: No. 31 (23 December 1996)

Grand Slam singles results
- Australian Open: 2R (1996)
- French Open: 2R (1997, 1998)
- Wimbledon: 4R (1996)
- US Open: 4R (1995)

Doubles
- Career record: 75–85
- Career titles: 2 ITF
- Highest ranking: No. 62 (13 November 1995)

Grand Slam doubles results
- Australian Open: 2R (1996)

Katarína Studeníková (born 2 September 1972) is a former professional Slovak tennis player.

Her highest singles ranking by the Women's Tennis Association (WTA) is 31st, which she reached on 23 December 1996. Her career-high in doubles was at 62, set on 13 November 1995. Studeníková defeated Monica Seles in Wimbledon in the year 1996.

== ITF finals ==
Legend
$100,000 tournaments
$75,000 tournaments
$50,000 tournaments
$25,000 tournaments
$10,000 tournaments

=== Singles (7–2) ===
Outcome	No.	Date	Tournament	Surface	Opponent	Score
Winner	1.	25 March 1991	ITF Putignano, Italy	Hard	(Italy) Cecilia Bargagni	7–5, 6–2
Winner	2.	25 May 1992	ITF Ashkelon, Israel	Hard	(United States) Aurora Gima	6–4, 6–4
Winner	3.	23 November 1992	ITF Ramat HaSharon, Israel	Hard	(France) Carole Lucarelli	6–4, 6–2
Winner	4.	29 March 1993	ITF Moulins, France	Hard	(Italy) Rita Grande	6–2, 6–2
Runner-up	5.	8 August 1993	ITF Sopot, Poland	Clay	(Germany) Petra Begerow	3–6, 6–4, 5–7
Winner	6.	21 August 1995	ITF Sopot, Poland	Clay	(Slovakia) Janette Husárová	4–6, 6–3, 6–3
Runner-up	7.	16 October 1995	ITF Flensburg, Germany	Carpet (i)	(France) Anne-Gaëlle Sidot	6–4, 4–6, 1–2 ret.
Winner	8.	17 December 1995	ITF Ostrava, Czech Republic	Hard (i)	(Czech Republic) Jana Pospíšilová	6–4, 6–3
Winner	9.	14 December 1997	ITF Ostrava, Czech Republic	Carpet (i)	(Czech Republic) Michaela Paštiková	6–3, 6–3

=== Doubles (2–9) ===
Outcome	No.	Date	Tournament	Surface	Partner	Opponents	Score
Runner-up	1.	17 September 1990	ITF Rabac, Yugoslavia	Clay	(Czechoslovakia) Gabriela Veselá	(Romania) Ruxandra Dragomir (Romania) Irina Spîrlea	6–1, 3–6, 4–6
Winner	2.	25 March 1991	ITF Putignano, Italy	Hard	(Czechoslovakia) Pavlína Rajzlová	(Italy) Giovanna Carotenuto (Finland) Marja-Liisa Kuurne	6–4, 6–2
Runner-up	3.	29 May 1991	ITF Brindisi, Italy	Clay	(Romania) Irina Spîrlea	(Uruguay) Patricia Miller (Argentina) Inés Gorrochategui	1–6, 6–7
Runner-up	4.	24 June 1991	ITF Dubrovnik, Yugoslavia	Clay	(Slovenia) Karin Lušnic	(Czechoslovakia) Dominika Gorecká (Czechoslovakia) Kateřina Sisková	4–6, 4–6
Winner	5.	22 July 1991	ITF Schwarzach, Austria	Clay	(Czechoslovakia) Karina Habšudová	(Latvia) Agnese Gustmane (Austria) Heidi Sprung	6–3, 6–1
Runner-up	6.	26 October 1992	ITF Saga, Japan	Clay	(Czechoslovakia) Eva Martincová	(Japan) Ayako Hirose (Japan) Masako Yanagi	2–6, 0–6
Runner-up	7.	28 June 1993	ITF Stuttgart, Germany	Clay	(Slovakia) Denisa Krajčovičová	(Czech Republic) Eva Martincová (Czech Republic) Sylvia Štefková	1–6, ret.
Runner-up	8.	8 August 1993	ITF Sopot, Poland	Clay	(Slovakia) Denisa Krajčovičová	(Slovenia) Tina Križan (Czech Republic) Květa Peschke	3–6, 1–6
Runner-up	9.	13 June 1994	ITF Sopot, Poland	Clay	(Slovakia) Patrícia Marková	(Slovakia) Janette Husárová (Slovakia) Radka Zrubáková	2–6, 5–7
Runner-up	10.	31 July 1995	ITF Sopot, Poland	Clay	(Slovenia) Tina Križan	(Czech Republic) Petra Kučová (Czech Republic) Lenka Němečková	0–2 ret.
Runner-up	11.	10 August 1998	ITF Bratislava, Slovakia	Clay	(Czech Republic) Lenka Němečková	(Czech Republic) Milena Nekvapilová (Czech Republic) Hana Šromová	2–6, 4–6
