= Andrea Glass =

German tennis player

- Country (sports): Germany
- Born: 17 July 1976 (age 48); Darmstadt, West Germany
- Retired: 2003
- Plays: Right Handed
- Prize money: $589,087

Singles
- Career record: 207–225
- Highest ranking: No. 53 (1 February 1999)

Grand Slam singles results
- Australian Open: 3R (1999)
- French Open: 2R (1997, 1999, 2001)
- Wimbledon: 2R (1997)
- US Open: 1R (1996, 97, 98, 99, 2001)

Doubles
- Career record: 48–75
- Career titles: 3 ITF
- Highest ranking: No. 85 (20 November 2000)

Grand Slam doubles results
- Australian Open: 1R (2001, 2003)
- French Open: 1R (2001)
- Wimbledon: 1R (2001)
- US Open: 2R (2001)

Andrea Glass (born 17 July 1976) is a former professional German tennis player.

Her highest WTA singles ranking is 53rd, which she reached on 1 February 1999, as a result of reaching the third round of the Australian Open, where Anna Kournikova beat her 4–6, 6–2, 6–3. Her career high in doubles was at 85 set on 20 November 2000.

Glass won the German Tennis Championship in both singles and doubles, partnering Barbara Rittner, in 1997. She played for Germany in the Fed Cup from 1998 to 2001.

== ITF finals ==
=== Singles (0–4) ===
Legend
$75,000 tournaments
$25,000 tournaments
$10,000 tournaments

Result	No.	Date	Tournament	Surface	Opponent	Score
Loss	1.	2 September 1991	Bad Nauheim, Germany	Clay	(Germany) Eva-Maria Schürhoff	2–6, 1–6
Loss	2.	11 June 1995	Novi Sad, Serbia	Clay	(Serbia and Montenegro) Tatjana Ječmenica	6–7^{(4–6)}, 1–6
Loss	3.	31 July 1995	Brasília, Brazil	Clay	(Venezuela) María Vento-Kabchi	2–6, 7–5, 4–6
Loss	4.	13 December 1998	Cali, Colombia	Clay	(Colombia) Fabiola Zuluaga	1–6, 1–6

=== Doubles (3–1) ===
Result	No.	Date	Tournament	Surface	Partner	Opponents	Score
Loss	1.	9 July 2000	Vaihingen, Germany	Clay	(Germany) Jasmin Wöhr	(Hungary) Virág Csurgó (Czech Republic) Eva Martincová	2–6, 6–2, 4–6
Win	2.	24 June 2002	Båstad, Sweden	Clay	(Czech Republic) Dominika Luzarová	(Australia) Nicole Sewell (Australia) Samantha Stosur	6–4, 6–1
Win	3.	8 July 2002	Darmstadt, Germany	Clay	(Germany) Kirstin Freye	(Czech Republic) Eva Birnerová (Czech Republic) Dominika Luzarová	7–5, 6–2
Win	4.	5 August 2002	Hechingen, Germany	Clay	(Germany) Jasmin Wöhr	(Germany) Lydia Steinbach (New Zealand) Shelley Stephens	6–4, 7–5
