= Dominika Luzarová =

Czech tennis player

- Full name: Dominika Luzarová
- Country (sports): Czech Republic
- Born: 18 July 1982 (age 43) Přerov, Czechoslovakia
- Turned pro: 1999
- Retired: 2004
- Prize money: $33,015

Singles
- Career record: 92–74
- Career titles: 2 ITF
- Highest ranking: No. 255 (10 February 2003)

Doubles
- Career record: 72–50
- Career titles: 8 ITF
- Highest ranking: No. 180 (17 February 2003)

Dominika Luzarová (born 18 July 1982) is a former Czech tennis player. She was born in Přerov, and won a total of ten ITF titles during her career, in which she reached a doubles ranking high of world no. 180.

== ITF Circuit finals ==
=== Singles: 5 (2–3) ===
$100,000 tournaments
$75,000 tournaments
$50,000 tournaments
$25,000 tournaments
$10,000 tournaments

Result	No.	Date	Tournament	Surface	Opponent	Score
Loss	1.	3 December 2000	Mallorca, Spain	Clay	(Spain) Rosa María Andrés Rodríguez	1–4, 0–4, 0–4
Win	2.	10 July 2001	Toruń, Poland	Clay	(Czech Republic) Petra Raclavská	2–6, 6–2, 6–0
Loss	3.	14 October 2001	Makarska, Croatia	Clay	(Czech Republic) Gabriela Chmelinová	7–5, 3–6, 5–7
Win	4.	14 October 2002	Giza, Egypt	Clay	(Czech Republic) Hana Šromová	7–6^{(7–2)}, 6–4
Loss	5.	19 May 2003	Olecko, Poland	Clay	(Poland) Magdalena Kiszczyńska	2–6, 0–3 RET

=== Doubles: 10 (8–2) ===
$100,000 tournaments
$75,000 tournaments
$50,000 tournaments
$25,000 tournaments
$10,000 tournaments

Result	No.	Date	Tournament	Surface	Partner	Opponents	Score
Loss	1.	31 July 2000	Bucharest, Romania	Clay	(Slovakia) Zuzana Kučová	(Romania) Liana Ungur (Romania) Edina Gallovits-Hall	5–7, 0–4 RET
Win	2.	21 August 2000	Bucharest, Romania	Clay	(Czech Republic) Veronika Raimrova	(Romania) Mihaela Moldovan (Romania) Alexandra Orasanu	2–6, 7–5, 7–5
Win	3.	14 October 2001	Makarska, Croatia	Clay	(Czech Republic) Gabriela Chmelinová	(Czech Republic) Lenka Novotná (Czech Republic) Pavlina Ticha	6–2, 7–5
Win	4.	18 February 2002	Mumbai, India	Hard (i)	(United Kingdom) Annabel Blow	(Chinese Taipei) Hsiao-Han Chao (Thailand) Suchanun Viratprasert	6–4, 6–3
Win	5.	25 March 2002	San Luis Potosí, Mexico	Clay	(Spain) Arantxa Parra Santonja	(Brazil) Vanessa Menga (Brazil) Carla Tiene	7–5, 4–6, 6–3
Win	6.	21 May 2002	Rijeka, Croatia	Clay	(Czech Republic) Gabriela Chmelinová	(Austria) Yvonne Meusburger (Austria) Jenny Zika	6–3, 3–6, 6–3
Win	7.	24 June 2002	Båstad, Sweden	Clay	(Germany) Andrea Glass	(Australia) Nicole Sewell (Australia) Samantha Stosur	6–4, 6–1
Loss	8.	8 July 2002	Darmstadt, Germany	Clay	(Czech Republic) Eva Birnerová	(Germany) Kirstin Freye (Germany) Andrea Glass	5–7, 2–6
Win	9.	14 October 2002	Giza, Egypt	Clay	(Czech Republic) Ema Janašková	(Slovenia) Kim Kambic (France) Aurélie Védy	7–5, 7–6
Win	10.	23 June 2003	Båstad, Sweden	Clay	(Czech Republic) Jana Hlaváčková	(Germany) Vanessa Henke (Czech Republic) Lenka Němečková	7–5, 6–2
