= 1992 International Austrian Indoor Championships – Singles =

Singles
- 1992 International Austrian Indoor Championships

Final
- Champion: (Commonwealth of Independent States) Natalia Medvedeva
- Runner-up: (France) Pascale Paradis-Mangon
- Score: 6–4, 6–2

Details
- Draw: 32 (2WC/4Q/2LL)
- Seeds: 8

Events
Singles	Doubles
← 1991 ·	Linz Open	· 1993 →

Manuela Maleeva-Fragnière was the defending champion, but did not compete this year.

Natalia Medvedeva won the title by defeating Pascale Paradis-Mangon 6–4, 6–2 in the final.

== Seeds ==
1. (Bulgaria) Katerina Maleeva (second round)
2. (Austria) Judith Wiesner (second round)
3. (France) Mary Pierce (quarterfinals)
4. (Italy) Sandra Cecchini (semifinals)
5. (Switzerland) Emanuela Zardo (second round)
6. (Sweden) Catarina Lindqvist (quarterfinals)
7. (Czechoslovakia) Regina Rajchrtová (second round)
8. (Germany) Marketa Kochta (first round)

== Draw ==
=== Key ===
- Q = Qualifier
- WC = Wild card
- LL = Lucky loser
- Alt = Alternate
- SE = Special exempt
- PR = Protected ranking
- ITF = ITF entry
- JE = Junior exempt
- w/o = Walkover
- r = Retired
- d = Defaulted
- SR = Special ranking

=== Finals ===
Semifinals
(Commonwealth of Independent States) Natalia Medvedeva	6	6
(Commonwealth of Independent States) Eugenia Maniokova	3	2
4	(Italy) Sandra Cecchini	2	5
(France) Pascale Paradis-Mangon	6	7

Final
(Commonwealth of Independent States) Natalia Medvedeva	6	6
(France) Pascale Paradis-Mangon	4	2

=== Top half ===
First round
1	(Bulgaria) K Maleeva	6	6
(Italy) L Garrone	1	3
(Commonwealth of Independent States) N Medvedeva	6	3	6
Q	(Italy) L Golarsa	1	6	0
Q	(Germany) W Probst	4	6	6^{6}
(Czechoslovakia) P Langrová	6	1	7^{8}
(Germany) C Porwik	6	6
8	(Germany) M Kochta	3	3
3	(France) M Pierce	6	6
LL	(Netherlands) M Oremans	2	1
(Germany) C Kohde-Kilsch	7	6
Q	(France) N Guerrée	5	1
(Germany) S Frankl	1	1
(Commonwealth of Independent States) E Maniokova	6	6
(Italy) R Reggi-Concato	6	2	4
5	(Switzerland) E Zardo	0	6	6

Second round
1	(Bulgaria) K Maleeva	5	4
(Commonwealth of Independent States) N Medvedeva	7	6
(Czechoslovakia) P Langrová	6	4	5
(Germany) C Porwik	4	6	7
3	(France) M Pierce	6	7^{7}
(Germany) C Kohde-Kilsch	1	6^{2}
(Commonwealth of Independent States) E Maniokova	6	6
5	(Switzerland) E Zardo	1	4

Quarterfinals
(Commonwealth of Independent States) N Medvedeva	6^{5}	6	6
(Germany) C Porwik	7^{7}	1	3
3	(France) M Pierce	6	3	3
(Commonwealth of Independent States) E Maniokova	4	6	6

Semifinals
(Commonwealth of Independent States) N Medvedeva	6	6
(Commonwealth of Independent States) E Maniokova	3	2

=== Bottom half ===
First round
7	(Czechoslovakia) R Rajchrtová	6	6
(Germany) I Cueto	1	1
Q	(Belgium) D Monami	6	6
(Hungary) A Temesvári	2	1
(France) N Herreman	6	6
WC	(Austria) S Reichel	1	0
LL	(Czechoslovakia) R Bobková	4	7	2
4	(Italy) S Cecchini	6	5	6
6	(Sweden) C Lindqvist	6	6
WC	(Austria) K Büche	3	0
(Italy) L Ferrando	2	3
(France) C Tanvier	6	6
(France) P Paradis-Mangon	6	6
(Austria) M Maruska	3	4
(Austria) P Ritter	2	3
2	(Austria) J Wiesner	6	6

Second round
7	(Czechoslovakia) R Rajchrtová	6	3	1
Q	(Belgium) D Monami	3	6	6
(France) N Herreman	6	2	2
4	(Italy) S Cecchini	1	6	6
6	(Sweden) C Lindqvist	6	6
(France) C Tanvier	4	3
(France) P Paradis-Mangon	6	6
2	(Austria) J Wiesner	3	3

Quarterfinals
Q	(Belgium) D Monami	4	6	3
4	(Italy) S Cecchini	6	2	6
6	(Sweden) C Lindqvist	4	0
(France) P Paradis-Mangon	6	6

Semifinals
4	(Italy) S Cecchini	2	5
(France) P Paradis-Mangon	6	7
