= 1991 Austrian Tennis Grand Prix =

- Date: 11–17 February
- Edition: 5th
- Category: Tier V
- Draw: 32S / 16D
- Prize money: 100,000
- Surface: Carpet / indoor
- Location: Linz, Austria
- Venue: Intersport Arena

Champions

Singles
- (Switzerland) Manuela Maleeva-Fragnière

Doubles
- (Switzerland) Manuela Maleeva-Fragnière (Italy) Raffaella Reggi
← 1990 ·	Linz Open	· 1992 →

The 1991 Austrian Tennis Grand Prix was a women's tennis tournament played on indoor carpet courts at the Intersport Arena in Linz, Austria that was part of Tier V of the 1991 WTA Tour. It was the fifth edition of the tournament and was held from 11 February through 17 February 1991. First-seeded Manuela Maleeva-Fragnière won the singles title and earned $18,000 first-prize money as well as 110 ranking points.

== Finals ==
=== Singles ===
(Switzerland) Manuela Maleeva-Fragnière defeated (Czechoslovakia) Petra Langrová 7–5, 6–3

- It was Maleeva-Fragnière's 1st singles title of the year and the 13th of her career.

=== Doubles ===
(Switzerland) Manuela Maleeva-Fragnière / (Italy) Raffaella Reggi defeated (Czechoslovakia) Petra Langrová / (Czechoslovakia) Radka Zrubáková 6–4, 1–6, 6–3

- It was Maleeva-Fragnière's 1st doubles title of the year and the 3rd of her career. It was Reggi's 1st doubles title of the year and the 3rd of her career.
