= 1994 EA-Generali Ladies Linz – Singles =

Singles
- 1994 EA-Generali Ladies Linz
- 1993 Champion: (Switzerland) Manuela Maleeva-Fragnière

Final
- Champion: (Belgium) Sabine Appelmans
- Runner-up: (Germany) Meike Babel
- Score: 6–1, 4–6, 7–6

Details
- Draw: 32
- Seeds: 8

Events
Singles	Doubles
← 1993 ·	Linz Open	· 1995 →

Manuela Maleeva-Fragnière was the defending champion but did not compete that year.

Sabine Appelmans won in the final 6–1, 4–6, 7–6 against Meike Babel.

== Seeds ==
A champion seed is indicated in bold text while text in italics indicates the round in which that seed was eliminated.

1. (Germany) Anke Huber (quarterfinals)
2. (France) Mary Pierce (first round)
3. (Bulgaria) Katerina Maleeva (first round)
4. (Georgia (country)) Leila Meskhi (quarterfinals)
5. (Belgium) **Sabine Appelmans (champion)**
6. (Germany) Meike Babel (final)
7. (Italy) Sandra Cecchini (quarterfinals)
8. (Italy) Laura Golarsa (first round)

== Draw ==
=== Key ===
- Q = Qualifier
- WC = Wild card
- LL = Lucky loser
- Alt = Alternate
- ITF = ITF entry
- PR = Protected ranking
- SR = Special ranking
- SE = Special exempt
- JE = Junior exempt
- JR = Junior Accelerator Programme entrant
- CO = College Accelerator Programme entrant
- NG = Next Gen Accelerator Program entrant
- w/o = Walkover
- r = Retired
- d = Defaulted

First round
1	(Germany) **A Huber**	**6**	**6**
(Austria) P Ritter	1	1
LL	(Netherlands) P Kamstra	5	**7**	4
(Germany) **C Singer**	**7**	5	**6**
(France) I Demongeot	2	5
(Russia) **E Likhovtseva**	**6**	**7**
(Belgium) L Courtois	0	**6**	4
5	(Belgium) **S Appelmans**	**6**	4	**6**
3	(Bulgaria) K Maleeva	6	**6**	6
(Austria) **B Schett**	**7**	3	**7**
Q	(Slovenia) **T Križan**	6	**6**	**6**
Q	(Germany) J Jehs	**7**	4	4
(Russia) **E Makarova**	**6**	3	**6**
(Hungary) A Temesvári	4	**6**	3
(Austria) **B Reinstadler**	**6**	**6**
8	(Italy) L Golarsa	3	0
6	(Germany) **M Babel**	**6**	**6**
WC	(Austria) S Plischke	4	1
(Spain) V Ruano-Pascual	4	**6**	4
WC	(Austria) **K Büche**	**6**	2	**6**
(Czech Republic) P Langrová	**6**	4	2
Q	(Belgium) **E Callens**	2	**6**	**6**
(Germany) P Begerow	**6**	4	6
4	(Georgia (country)) **L Meskhi**	3	**6**	**7**
7	(Italy) **S Cecchini**	**6**	**7**
(Belgium) N Feber	3	5
Q	(Netherlands) L Niemantsverdriet	3	**6**	1
(Czech Republic) **L Richterová**	**6**	3	**6**
(Russia) **E Maniokova**	**6**	**6**
(Netherlands) C Wegink	2	3
(Czech Republic) **E Martincová**	**6**	**6**
2	(France) M Pierce	4	1

Second round
1	(Germany) **A Huber**	**6**	**6**
(Germany) C Singer	3	2
(Russia) E Likhovtseva	**6**	2	2
5	(Belgium) **S Appelmans**	1	**6**	**6**
(Austria) **B Schett**	**6**	**6**
Q	(Slovenia) T Križan	2	3
(Russia) **E Makarova**	**6**	**6**
(Austria) B Reinstadler	4	3
6	(Germany) **M Babel**	**6**	**6**
WC	(Austria) K Büche	1	0
Q	(Belgium) E Callens	5	3
4	(Georgia (country)) **L Meskhi**	**7**	**6**
7	(Italy) **S Cecchini**	**6**	5	**6**
(Czech Republic) L Richterová	4	**7**	4
(Russia) **E Maniokova**	**6**	**6**
(Czech Republic) E Martincová	2	2

Quarterfinals
1	(Germany) A Huber	**6**	3	4
5	(Belgium) **S Appelmans**	4	**6**	**6**
(Austria) **B Schett**	**6**	**7**
(Russia) E Makarova	1	6
6	(Germany) **M Babel**	**7**	**6**
4	(Georgia (country)) L Meskhi	5	3
7	(Italy) S Cecchini	**6**	6	4
(Russia) **E Maniokova**	3	**7**	**6**

Semifinals
5	(Belgium) **S Appelmans**	**7**	**6**
(Austria) B Schett	5	4
6	(Germany) **M Babel**	**6**	**6**
(Russia) E Maniokova	3	4

Final
5	(Belgium) **Sabine Appelmans**	**6**	4	**7**
6	(Germany) Meike Babel	1	**6**	6
