= 1995 EA-Generali Ladies Linz – Singles =

Singles
- 1995 EA-Generali Ladies Linz

Final
- Champion: (Czech Republic) Jana Novotná
- Runner-up: (Germany) Barbara Rittner
- Score: 6–7, 6–3, 6–4

Details
- Draw: 32
- Seeds: 8

Events
Singles	Doubles
← 1994 ·	EA-Generali Ladies Linz	· 1996 →

Sabine Appelmans was the defending champion but lost in the quarterfinals to Beate Reinstadler.

Jana Novotná won in the final 6–7, 6–3, 6–4 against Barbara Rittner.

== Seeds ==
A champion seed is indicated in bold text while text in italics indicates the round in which that seed was eliminated.

1. (Czech Republic) **Jana Novotná (champion)**
2. (Croatia) Iva Majoli (second round)
3. n/a
4. (Slovakia) Karina Habšudová (second round)
5. (France) Nathalie Tauziat (first round)
6. (Italy) Sandra Cecchini (quarterfinals)
7. (Belgium) Sabine Appelmans (quarterfinals)
8. (United States) Meredith McGrath (second round)

== Draw ==
=== Key ===
- Q = Qualifier
- WC = Wild card
- LL = Lucky loser
- Alt = Alternate
- SE = Special exempt
- PR = Protected ranking
- ITF = ITF entry
- JE = Junior exempt
- w/o = Walkover
- r = Retired
- d = Defaulted
- SR = Special ranking

First round
1	(Czech Republic) **J Novotná**	**6**	**6**
(Croatia) M Murić	3	0
(Romania) R Dragomir	3	1
(Austria) **B Schett**	**6**	**6**
Q	(Czech Republic) E Melicharová	3	4
(Austria) **P Schwarz**	**6**	**6**
(Belgium) E Callens	3	4
8	(United States) **M McGrath**	**6**	**6**
4	(Slovakia) **K Habšudová**	**6**	**6**
(Czech Republic) P Langrová	3	3
(Poland) K Nowak	3	0
(Germany) **M Babel**	**6**	**6**
(Russia) **E Makarova**	**6**	**7**
Q	(Russia) E Maniokova	4	5
(Czech Republic) L Richterová	2	3
6	(Italy) **S Cecchini**	**6**	**6**
7	(Belgium) **S Appelmans**	**6**	**6**
(Netherlands) M Oremans	2	3
(Czech Republic) R Bobková	6	**6**	5
WC	(Austria) **M Schnell**	**7**	3	**7**
(Germany) W Probst	3	3
(Austria) **B Reinstadler**	**6**	**6**
WC	(Austria) **K Büche**	**6**	**6**
LL	(Austria) S Reichel	1	1
5	(France) N Tauziat	5	**6**	2
Q	(Finland) **N Dahlman**	**7**	4	**6**
(Sweden) **Å Carlsson**	**6**	**6**
Q	(France) L Ghirardi	4	4
(Germany) **B Rittner**	**6**	4	**6**
LL	(Italy) F Perfetti	2	**6**	3
(Germany) C Singer	**6**	2	3
2	(Croatia) **I Majoli**	3	**6**	**6**

Second round
1	(Czech Republic) **J Novotná**	**6**	**6**
(Austria) B Schett	2	4
(Austria) **P Schwarz**	**6**	1	**7**
8	(United States) M McGrath	2	**6**	6
4	(Slovakia) K Habšudová	4	2
(Germany) **M Babel**	**6**	**6**
(Russia) E Makarova	4	2
6	(Italy) **S Cecchini**	**6**	**6**
7	(Belgium) **S Appelmans**	4	**6**	**6**
WC	(Austria) M Schnell	**6**	3	4
(Austria) **B Reinstadler**	**6**	6	**6**
WC	(Austria) K Büche	4	**7**	4
Q	(Finland) **N Dahlman**	**6**	3	**6**
(Sweden) Å Carlsson	2	**6**	4
(Germany) **B Rittner**	**6**	**6**
2	(Croatia) I Majoli	2	1

Quarterfinals
1	(Czech Republic) **J Novotná**	**6**	1	**6**
(Austria) P Schwarz	1	**6**	2
(Germany) **M Babel**	**6**	**6**
6	(Italy) S Cecchini	1	1
7	(Belgium) S Appelmans	6	**6**	4
(Austria) **B Reinstadler**	**7**	3	**6**
Q	(Finland) N Dahlman	1	2
(Germany) **B Rittner**	**6**	**6**

Semifinals
1	(Czech Republic) **J Novotná**	**6**	**6**
(Germany) M Babel	2	4
(Austria) B Reinstadler	1	3
(Germany) **B Rittner**	**6**	**6**

Final
1	(Czech Republic) **Jana Novotná**	6	**6**	**6**
(Germany) Barbara Rittner	**7**	3	4
