= 1992 International Austrian Indoor Championships =

- Date: 10–16 February
- Edition: 6th
- Category: Tier V
- Draw: 32S / 16D
- Prize money: 100,000
- Surface: Carpet / indoor
- Location: Linz, Austria
- Venue: Intersport Arena

Champions

Singles
- (Commonwealth of Independent States) Natalia Medvedeva

Doubles
- (Netherlands) Monique Kiene / (Netherlands) Miriam Oremans
← 1991 ·	Linz Open	· 1993 →

The 1992 International Austrian Indoor Championships was a women's tennis tournament played on indoor carpet courts at the Intersport Arena in Linz, Austria that was part of Tier V of the 1992 WTA Tour. It was the sixth edition of the tournament and was held from 10 February through 16 February 1992.Unseeded Natalia Medvedeva won the singles title and earned $18,000 first-prize money as well as 110 ranking points.

== Finals ==
=== Singles ===
(Commonwealth of Independent States) Natalia Medvedeva defeated (France) Pascale Paradis-Mangon 6–4, 6–2

- It was Medvedeva's 1st singles title of the year and the 2nd of her career.

=== Doubles ===
(Netherlands) Monique Kiene / (Netherlands) Miriam Oremans defeated (Germany) Claudia Porwik / (Italy) Raffaella Reggi-Concato 6–4, 6–2

- It was Kiene's only doubles title of her career. It was Oremans' only doubles title of the year and the first of her career.
