= 1993 International Austrian Indoor Championships – Doubles =

Doubles
- 1993 International Austrian Indoor Championships

Final
- Champions: (Russia) Eugenia Maniokova (Georgia (country)) Leila Meskhi
- Runners-up: (Spain) Conchita Martínez (Austria) Judith Wiesner
- Score: Walkover

Details
- Draw: 16 (1WC/1Q)
- Seeds: 4

Events
Singles	Doubles
← 1992 ·	Linz Open	· 1994 →

Monique Kiene and Miriam Oremans were the defending champions, but Oremans chose to compete at Indian Wells during the same week. Kiene was set to team up with Wiltrud Probst, but the pair was forced to withdraw before their first round match.

Eugenia Maniokova and Leila Meskhi won the title due to a walkover, after Conchita Martínez (who was teaming up with Judith Wiesner) was forced to withdraw after a suffering a flu during the singles final.

== Seeds ==
1. (Germany) Claudia Porwik / (Czech Republic) Andrea Strnadová (semifinals)
2. (Spain) Conchita Martínez / (Austria) Judith Wiesner (final, withdrew due to a flu on Martínez)
3. (United Kingdom) Jo Durie / (Czech Republic) Petra Langrová (quarterfinals)
4. (Netherlands) Monique Kiene / (Germany) Wiltrud Probst (first round, withdrew)

== Draw ==
=== Key ===
- Q = Qualifier
- WC = Wild card
- LL = Lucky loser
- Alt = Alternate
- SE = Special exempt
- PR = Protected ranking
- ITF = ITF entry
- JE = Junior exempt
- w/o = Walkover
- r = Retired
- d = Defaulted
- SR = Special ranking

=== Draw ===
First round
1	(Germany) C Porwik (Czech Republic) A Strnadová	6	6
(Italy) S Farina (Finland) P Thorén	3	1
(Romania) R Dragomir (Romania) I Spîrlea	6	6
(Ukraine) E Brioukhovets (Kazakhstan) E Likhovtseva	3	0
4	(Netherlands) M Kiene (Germany) W Probst
WC	(Netherlands) K Boogert (Austria) S Reichel	w/o
(Belgium) D Monami (Germany) K Oeljeklaus	1	2
(Russia) E Maniokova (Georgia (country)) L Meskhi	6	6
(Russia) N Bykova-Egorova (Germany) C Singer	6	7^{7}
(Australia) L Pleming (Czech Republic) E Švíglerová	1	6^{1}
Q	(Slovakia) K Studeníková (Slovakia) D Szabová	6^{9}	2
3	(United Kingdom) J Durie (Czech Republic) P Langrová	7^{11}	6
(Italy) L Golarsa (France) N van Lottum	6	4	6
(Czech Republic) A Noháčová (Czech Republic) Sylvia Podlahova	1	6	3
(Czech Republic) R Bobková (Austria) S Dopfer	1	1
2	(Spain) C Martínez (Austria) J Wiesner	6	6

Quarterfinals
1	(Germany) C Porwik (Czech Republic) A Strnadová	6	6^{4}	6
(Romania) R Dragomir (Romania) I Spîrlea	4	7^{7}	1
WC	(Netherlands) K Boogert (Austria) S Reichel	2	2
(Russia) E Maniokova (Georgia (country)) L Meskhi	6	6
(Russia) N Bykova-Egorova (Germany) C Singer	6	6
3	(United Kingdom) J Durie (Czech Republic) P Langrová	4	4
(Italy) L Golarsa (France) N van Lottum	1	4
2	(Spain) C Martínez (Austria) J Wiesner	6	6

Semifinals
1	(Germany) C Porwik (Czech Republic) A Strnadová	4	5
(Russia) E Maniokova (Georgia (country)) L Meskhi	6	7
(Russia) N Bykova-Egorova (Germany) C Singer	1	2
2	(Spain) C Martínez (Austria) J Wiesner	6	6

Final
(Russia) E Maniokova (Georgia (country)) L Meskhi	w/o
2	(Spain) C Martínez (Austria) J Wiesner
