= 1992 International Austrian Indoor Championships – Doubles =

Doubles
- 1992 International Austrian Indoor Championships

Final
- Champions: (Netherlands) Monique Kiene (Netherlands) Miriam Oremans
- Runners-up: (Germany) Claudia Porwik (Italy) Raffaella Reggi-Concato
- Score: 6–4, 6–2

Details
- Draw: 16 (1Q)
- Seeds: 4

Events
| Singles | Doubles |
| ← 1991 · | Linz Open | · 1993 → |

Manuela Maleeva-Fragnière and Raffaella Reggi-Concato were the defending champions, but Maleeva-Fragnière did not compete this year.

Reggi-Concato teamed up with Claudia Porwik and lost the final to qualifiers Monique Kiene and Miriam Oremans. The score was 6–4, 6–2.

== Seeds ==
1. (Germany) Claudia Porwik / (Italy) Raffaella Reggi-Concato (final)
2. (France) Catherine Suire / (France) Catherine Tanvier (first round)
3. (Italy) Sandra Cecchini / (France) Nathalie Herreman (first round)
4. (Italy) Laura Garrone / (Italy) Laura Golarsa (quarterfinals)

== Draw ==
=== Key ===
- Q = Qualifier
- WC = Wild card
- LL = Lucky loser
- Alt = Alternate
- SE = Special exempt
- PR = Protected ranking
- ITF = ITF entry
- JE = Junior exempt
- w/o = Walkover
- r = Retired
- d = Defaulted
- SR = Special ranking

=== Draw ===
First round
1 | (Germany) C Porwik (Italy) R Reggi-Concato | 6 | 6
(France) N Ballet (France) Agnes Romand | 2 | 2
(Czechoslovakia) P Langrová (Czechoslovakia) J Pospíšilová | 7^{7} | 6
(Spain) V Ruano Pascual (Austria) H Sprung | 6^{4} | 1
4 | (Italy) L Garrone (Italy) L Golarsa | 6 | 5 | 7^{7}
(United States) J Fuchs (Sweden) M Lindström | 2 | 7 | 6^{3}
(Czechoslovakia) R Rajchrtová (Hungary) A Temesvári | 7^{7} | 6
(Commonwealth of Independent States) E Maniokova (Commonwealth of Independent States) N Medvedeva | 6^{5} | 1
(Germany) M Kochta (Austria) S Reichel | 3 | 4
(Czechoslovakia) I Havrlíková (Czechoslovakia) A Noháčová | 6 | 6
(France) P Paradis-Mangon (France) S Testud | 7^{7} | 7^{7}
3 | (Italy) S Cecchini (France) N Herreman | 6^{4} | 6^{1}
(Czechoslovakia) R Bobková (Czechoslovakia) H Vildová | 5 | 6 | 3
(Italy) L Ferrando (Germany) W Probst | 7 | 3 | 6
Q | (Netherlands) M Kiene (Netherlands) M Oremans | 6 | 6
2 | (France) C Suire (France) C Tanvier | 2 | 4

Quarterfinals
1 | (Germany) C Porwik (Italy) R Reggi-Concato | 7 | 6
(Czechoslovakia) P Langrová (Czechoslovakia) J Pospíšilová | 5 | 4
4 | (Italy) L Garrone (Italy) L Golarsa | 1 | 6 | 2
(Czechoslovakia) R Rajchrtová (Hungary) A Temesvári | 6 | 3 | 6
(Czechoslovakia) I Havrlíková (Czechoslovakia) A Noháčová | 7 | 6
(France) P Paradis-Mangon (France) S Testud | 5 | 1
(Italy) L Ferrando (Germany) W Probst | 6 | 2 | 1
Q | (Netherlands) M Kiene (Netherlands) M Oremans | 4 | 6 | 6

Semifinals
1 | (Germany) C Porwik (Italy) R Reggi-Concato | 6 | 6
(Czechoslovakia) R Rajchrtová (Hungary) A Temesvári | 4 | 3
(Czechoslovakia) I Havrlíková (Czechoslovakia) A Noháčová | 3 | 4
Q | (Netherlands) M Kiene (Netherlands) M Oremans | 6 | 6

Final
1 | (Germany) C Porwik (Italy) R Reggi-Concato | 4 | 2
Q | (Netherlands) M Kiene (Netherlands) M Oremans | 6 | 6
