= 1988 Porsche Tennis Grand Prix =

- Date: 10–16 October
- Edition: 11th
- Category: Category 4
- Draw: 32S / 16D
- Prize money: $250,000
- Surface: Hard / indoor
- Location: Filderstadt, West Germany
- Venue: Filderstadt Tennis Centre

Champions

Singles
- (United States) Martina Navratilova

Doubles
- (Poland) Iwona Kuczyńska (United States) Martina Navratilova
← 1987 ·	Porsche Tennis Grand Prix	· 1989 →

The 1988 Porsche Tennis Grand Prix was a women's tennis tournament played on indoor carpet courts at the Filderstadt Tennis Centre in Filderstadt in West Germany and was part of the Category 4 tier of the 1988 WTA Tour. It was the 11th edition of the tournament and was held from 10 October to 16 October 1988. First-seeded Martina Navratilova won the singles title, her third consecutive and fifth in total and earned $50,000 first-prize money.

== Finals ==
=== Singles ===
(United States) Martina Navratilova defeated (United States) Chris Evert 6–2, 6–3

- It was Navratilova's 7th singles title of the year and the 136th of her career.

=== Doubles ===
(Poland) Iwona Kuczyńska / (United States) Martina Navratilova defeated (Italy) Raffaella Reggi / (South Africa) Elna Reinach 6–1, 6–4

- It was Kuczynska's only title of the year and the 1st of her career. It was Navratilova's 6th doubles title of the year and the 141st of her career.

== Prize money ==
Event	W	F	SF	QF	Round of 16	Round of 32
Singles	$50,000	$22,500	$11,250	$5,650	$2,850	$1,475

== See also ==
- Evert–Navratilova rivalry
