= 1991 Austrian Tennis Grand Prix – Singles =

Singles
- 1991 Austrian Tennis Grand Prix

Final
- Champion: (Switzerland) Manuela Maleeva-Fragnière
- Runner-up: (Czechoslovakia) Petra Langrová
- Score: 6–4, 7–6^{(7–1)}

Details
- Draw: 32 (2WC/4Q/1LL)
- Seeds: 8

Events
Singles	Doubles
← 1990 ·	Linz Open	· 1992 →

Marion Maruska was the defending champion, but lost in the quarterfinals to Petra Langrová.

Manuela Maleeva-Fragnière won the title by defeating Langrová 6–4, 7–6^{(7–1)} in the final.

== Seeds ==
1. (Switzerland) Manuela Maleeva-Fragnière (champion)
2. (Austria) Barbara Paulus (second round)
3. (Italy) Raffaella Reggi (quarterfinals)
4. (Czechoslovakia) Regina Rajchrtová (semifinals)
5. (Germany) Claudia Kohde-Kilsch (semifinals)
6. (Italy) Laura Golarsa (first round)
7. (Czechoslovakia) Radka Zrubáková (second round)
8. (France) Catherine Tanvier (first round)

== Draw ==
=== Key ===
- Q = Qualifier
- WC = Wild card
- LL = Lucky loser
- Alt = Alternate
- SE = Special exempt
- PR = Protected ranking
- ITF = ITF entry
- JE = Junior exempt
- w/o = Walkover
- r = Retired
- d = Defaulted
- SR = Special ranking

=== Finals ===
Semifinals
1	(Switzerland) Manuela Maleeva-Fragnière	2	6	6
4	(Czechoslovakia) Regina Rajchrtová	6	3	4
5	(Germany) Claudia Kohde-Kilsch	6	1	4
(Czechoslovakia) Petra Langrová	3	6	6

Final
1	(Switzerland) Manuela Maleeva-Fragnière	6	7^{7}
(Czechoslovakia) Petra Langrová	4	6^{1}

=== Top half ===
First round
1	(Switzerland) M Maleeva-Fragnière	6	6
(France) C Mothes	0	1
(Finland) P Thorén	6	6
(France) M Laval	2	2
(Germany) S Meier	7	3	6
(Sweden) C Dahlman	5	6	2
Q	(Soviet Union) E Maniokova	7	2	6
8	(France) C Tanvier	5	6	1
4	(Czechoslovakia) R Rajchrtová	6	6
(Brazil) L Corsato	2	0
WC	(Austria) S Reichel	7	1	0
(Switzerland) C Cohen	5	6	6
(Austria) S Dopfer	0	2
(France) P Paradis	6	6
LL	(Belgium) D Monami	6	6
6	(Italy) L Golarsa	2	1

Second round
1	(Switzerland) M Maleeva-Fragnière	6	6
(Finland) P Thorén	1	3
(Germany) S Meier	6	1	4
Q	(Soviet Union) E Maniokova	4	6	6
4	(Czechoslovakia) R Rajchrtová	6	6
(Switzerland) C Cohen	1	0
(France) P Paradis	6	7
LL	(Belgium) D Monami	3	5

Quarterfinals
1	(Switzerland) M Maleeva-Fragnière	6	6
Q	(Soviet Union) E Maniokova	2	2
4	(Czechoslovakia) R Rajchrtová	6	6
(France) P Paradis	4	4

Semifinals
1	(Switzerland) M Maleeva-Fragnière	2	6	6
4	(Czechoslovakia) R Rajchrtová	6	3	4

=== Bottom half ===
First round
5	(Germany) C Kohde-Kilsch	6	7
(France) S Testud	1	5
(Austria) P Ritter	6	7^{7}
(France) P Etchemendy	3	6^{5}
(Peru) P Vásquez	6	2	6
(Bulgaria) E Pampoulova	4	6	3
(Austria) B Reinstadlet	6^{0}	4
3	(Italy) R Reggi	7^{7}	6
7	(Czechoslovakia) R Zrubáková	6	6
Q	(Soviet Union) V Milvidskaia	1	3
(Czechoslovakia) P Langrová	6	6
(Germany) S Frankl	2	2
Q	(Czechoslovakia) L Lásková	3	4
WC	(Austria) M Maruska	6	6
Q	(Germany) S Auer	1	2
2	(Austria) B Paulus	6	6

Second round
5	(Germany) C Kohde-Kilsch	6	5	6
(Austria) P Ritter	4	7	3
(Peru) P Vásquez	1	1
3	(Italy) R Reggi	6	6
7	(Czechoslovakia) R Zrubáková	3	1
(Czechoslovakia) P Langrová	6	6
WC	(Austria) M Maruska	6	6
2	(Austria) B Paulus	3	3

Quarterfinals
5	(Germany) C Kohde-Kilsch	7^{7}	6
3	(Italy) R Reggi	6^{5}	3
(Czechoslovakia) P Langrová	6	6
WC	(Austria) M Maruska	3	1

Semifinals
5	(Germany) C Kohde-Kilsch	6	1	4
(Czechoslovakia) P Langrová	3	6	6
