= 1988 Porsche Tennis Grand Prix – Singles =

Singles
- 1988 Porsche Tennis Grand Prix
- 1987 Champion: (United States) Martina Navratilova

Final
- Champion: (United States) Martina Navratilova
- Runner-up: (United States) Chris Evert
- Score: 6–2, 6–3

Details
- Draw: 32
- Seeds: 8

Events
Singles	Doubles
← 1987 ·	Porsche Tennis Grand Prix	· 1989 →

First-seeded Martina Navratilova was the defending champion and won in the final 6–2, 6–3 against Chris Evert.

== Seeds ==
A champion seed is indicated in bold text while text in italics indicates the round in which that seed was eliminated.

1. (United States) **Martina Navratilova (champion)**
2. (United States) Chris Evert (final)
3. (Argentina) Gabriela Sabatini (first round)
4. (West Germany) Claudia Kohde-Kilsch (first round)
5. (United States) Mary Joe Fernández (second round)
6. (West Germany) Sylvia Hanika (quarterfinals)
7. (Spain) Arantxa Sánchez (first round)
8. (Italy) Raffaella Reggi (semifinals)

== Draw ==
=== Key ===
- Q = Qualifier
- WC = Wild card
- LL = Lucky loser
- Alt = Alternate
- ITF = ITF entry
- PR = Protected ranking
- SR = Special ranking
- SE = Special exempt
- JE = Junior exempt
- JR = Junior Accelerator Programme entrant
- CO = College Accelerator Programme entrant
- NG = Next Gen Accelerator Program entrant
- w/o = Walkover
- r = Retired
- d = Defaulted

First round
1	(United States) **M Navratilova**	**6**	**6**
(West Germany) C Porwik	1	2
Q	(France) C Suire	6	4
(Netherlands) **B Schultz**	**7**	**6**
(New Zealand) B Cordwell	3	2
(Czechoslovakia) **R Zrubáková**	**6**	**6**
Q	(France) S Amiach	3	4
5	(United States) **M J Fernández**	**6**	**6**
3	(Argentina) G Sabatini	**6**	6	6
(Czechoslovakia) **J Novotná**	1	**7**	**7**
(South Africa) D van Rensburg	**6**	4	3
(South Africa) **E Reinach**	3	**6**	**6**
(West Germany) **I Cueto**	**6**	**7**
(France) J Halard	4	5
(West Germany) **E Pfaff**	4	**7**	**6**
7	(Spain) A Sánchez	**6**	5	4
8	(Italy) **R Reggi**	4	**7**	**6**
Q	(France) C Tanvier	**6**	5	2
(Austria) **J Wiesner**	3	**6**	**6**
(United Kingdom) M Javer	**6**	2	0
(France) **N Tauziat**	**6**	**6**
(United Kingdom) J Durie	3	2
(Austria) **B Paulus**	**6**	**6**
4	(West Germany) C Kohde-Kilsch	3	2
6	(West Germany) **S Hanika**	**6**	**6**
(Socialist Federal Republic of Yugoslavia) S Goleš	2	2
(France) **I Demongeot**	3	**6**	**7**
Q	(Czechoslovakia) J Pospíšilová	**6**	4	6
(Sweden) **C Lindqvist**	4	**6**	**6**
(West Germany) W Probst	**6**	4	4
(West Germany) S Meier	3	5
2	(United States) **C Evert**	**6**	**7**

Second round
1	(United States) **M Navratilova**	**6**	**6**
(Netherlands) B Schultz	0	2
(Czechoslovakia) **R Zrubáková**	**w/o**
5	(United States) M J Fernández
(Czechoslovakia) J Novotná	0	1
(South Africa) **E Reinach**	**6**	**6**
(West Germany) I Cueto	**6**	4	5
(West Germany) **E Pfaff**	3	**6**	**7**
8	(Italy) **R Reggi**	**6**	**6**
(Austria) J Wiesner	4	4
(France) **N Tauziat**	**6**	**6**
(Austria) B Paulus	2	2
6	(West Germany) **S Hanika**	**6**	3	**7**
(France) I Demongeot	4	**6**	6
(Sweden) C Lindqvist	1	6
2	(United States) **C Evert**	**6**	**7**

Quarterfinals
1	(United States) **M Navratilova**	**6**	**6**
(Czechoslovakia) R Zrubáková	1	0
(South Africa) E Reinach	3	**6**	4
(West Germany) **E Pfaff**	**6**	4	**6**
8	(Italy) **R Reggi**	**6**	**6**
(France) N Tauziat	2	3
6	(West Germany) S Hanika	0	4
2	(United States) **C Evert**	**6**	**6**

Semifinals
1	(United States) **M Navratilova**	**6**	**6**
(West Germany) E Pfaff	4	2
8	(Italy) R Reggi	3	1
2	(United States) **C Evert**	**6**	**6**

Final
1	(United States) **Martina Navratilova**	**6**	**6**
2	(United States) Chris Evert	2	3

== See also ==
- Evert–Navratilova rivalry
