= 1993 International Austrian Indoor Championships =

- Date: 22–28 February
- Edition: 7th
- Category: Tier III
- Draw: 32S / 16D
- Prize money: 150,000
- Surface: Carpet / indoor
- Location: Linz, Austria
- Venue: Intersport Arena

Champions

Singles
- (Switzerland) Manuela Maleeva-Fragnière

Doubles
- (Russia) Eugenia Maniokova / (Georgia (country)) Leila Meskhi
← 1992 ·	Linz Open	· 1994 →

The 1993 International Austrian Indoor Championships was a women's tennis tournament played on indoor carpet courts at the Intersport Arena in Linz, Austria that was part of Tier III of the 1993 WTA Tour. It was the seventh edition of the tournament and was held from 22 February through 28 February 1993. Second-seeded Manuela Maleeva-Fragnière won the singles title, her second at the event after 1991, and earned $27,000 first-prize money as well as 190 ranking points.

== Finals ==
=== Singles ===
(Switzerland) Manuela Maleeva-Fragnière defeated (Spain) Conchita Martínez 6–2, 1–0 ret

- It was Maleeva-Fragnière' 1st singles title of the year and the 17th of her career.

=== Doubles ===
(Russia) Eugenia Maniokova / (Georgia (country)) Leila Meskhi defeated (Spain) Conchita Martínez / (Austria) Judith Wiesner w/o

- It was Maniokova's 1st doubles title of the year and the 3rd of her career. It was Meskhi's only doubles title of the year and the 8th of her career.
