= 1994 EA-Generali Ladies Linz – Doubles =

Doubles
- 1994 EA-Generali Ladies Linz
- 1993 Champions: (Russia) Eugenia Maniokova (Georgia (country)) Leila Meskhi

Final
- Champions: (Russia) Eugenia Maniokova (Georgia (country)) Leila Meskhi
- Runners-up: (Sweden) Åsa Carlsson (Germany) Caroline Schneider
- Score: 6–2, 6–2

Details
- Draw: 16
- Seeds: 4

Events
Singles	Doubles
← 1993 ·	Linz Open	· 1995 →

Eugenia Maniokova and Leila Meskhi were the defending champions and won in the final 6–2, 6–2 against Åsa Carlsson and Caroline Schneider.

== Seeds ==
Champion seeds are indicated in bold text while text in italics indicates the round in which those seeds were eliminated.

1. (Russia) **Eugenia Maniokova** / (Georgia (country)) **Leila Meskhi (champions)**
2. (Belgium) Sabine Appelmans / (Germany) Claudia Porwik (withdrew)
3. (France) Isabelle Demongeot / (Germany) Christina Singer (quarterfinals)
4. (Czech Republic) Radka Bobková / (Czech Republic) Petra Langrová (semifinals)

== Draw ==
=== Key ===
- Q = Qualifier
- WC = Wild card
- LL = Lucky loser
- Alt = Alternate
- ITF = ITF entry
- PR = Protected ranking
- SR = Special ranking
- SE = Special exempt
- JE = Junior exempt
- JR = Junior Accelerator Programme entrant
- CO = College Accelerator Programme entrant
- NG = Next Gen Accelerator Program entrant
- w/o = Walkover
- r = Retired
- d = Defaulted

First round
1	(Russia) **E Maniokova** (Georgia (country)) **L Meskhi**	**6**	**6**
(Austria) D Leupold (Austria) N Murn	2	0
Q	(Germany) **M Babel** (Austria) **B Reinstadler**	**6**	**6**
(Czech Republic) E Martincová (Czech Republic) S Štefková	2	4
3	(France) **I Demongeot** (Germany) **C Singer**	**6**	**6**
(Slovenia) T Križan (Slovakia) D Szabova	1	1
(Italy) S Cecchini (Italy) L Garrone	**6**	6	6
(Russia) **E Likhovtseva** (Russia) **E Makarova**	3	**7**	**7**
(Russia) **S Cherneva** (Russia) **N Egorova**	**7**	**6**
(Belgium) L Courtois (Belgium) N Feber	6	3
WC	(Austria) S Plischke (Austria) S Reichel	3	**6**	2
4	(Czech Republic) **R Bobková** (Czech Republic) **P Langrová**	**6**	3	**6**
(Sweden) **Å Carlsson** (Germany) **C Schneider**	**6**	**6**
(Czech Republic) P Rajzlová (Czech Republic) H Vildová	4	3
(Czech Republic) K Hrdličková (Czech Republic) J Pospíšilová	**6**	4	6
(Italy) **L Golarsa** (France) **M Pierce**	4	**6**	**7**

Quarterfinals
1	(Russia) **E Maniokova** (Georgia (country)) **L Meskhi**	**6**	**6**
Q	(Germany) M Babel (Austria) B Reinstadler	1	4
3	(France) I Demongeot (Germany) C Singer	**6**	3	3
(Russia) **E Likhovtseva** (Russia) **E Makarova**	1	**6**	**6**
(Russia) S Cherneva (Russia) N Egorova	5	4
4	(Czech Republic) **R Bobková** (Czech Republic) **P Langrová**	**7**	**6**
(Sweden) **Å Carlsson** (Germany) **C Schneider**	**7**	**6**
(Italy) L Golarsa (France) M Pierce	6	4

Semifinals
1	(Russia) **E Maniokova** (Georgia (country)) **L Meskhi**	**7**	**6**
(Russia) E Likhovtseva (Russia) E Makarova	5	2
4	(Czech Republic) R Bobková (Czech Republic) P Langrová	1	**6**	4
(Sweden) **Å Carlsson** (Germany) **C Schneider**	**6**	3	**6**

Final
1	(Russia) **Eugenia Maniokova** (Georgia (country)) **Leila Meskhi**	**6**	**6**
(Sweden) Åsa Carlsson (Germany) Caroline Schneider	2	2
