= 1988 Porsche Tennis Grand Prix – Doubles =

Doubles
- 1988 Porsche Tennis Grand Prix

Final
- Champions: (Poland) Iwona Kuczyńska (United States) Martina Navratilova
- Runners-up: (Italy) Raffaella Reggi (South Africa) Elna Reinach
- Score: 6–1, 6–4

Details
- Draw: 16
- Seeds: 4

Events
Singles	Doubles
← 1987 ·	Porsche Tennis Grand Prix	· 1989 →

Martina Navratilova and Pam Shriver were the defending champions but only Navratilova competed that year with Iwona Kuczyńska.

Kuczynska and Navratilova won in the final 6–1, 6–4 against Raffaella Reggi and Elna Reinach.

== Seeds ==
Champion seeds are indicated in bold text while text in italics indicates the round in which those seeds were eliminated.

1. (Czechoslovakia) Jana Novotná / (France) Catherine Suire (first round)
2. (Sweden) Catarina Lindqvist / (Denmark) Tine Scheuer-Larsen (first round)
3. (France) Nathalie Herreman / (France) Catherine Tanvier (semifinals)
4. (France) Isabelle Demongeot / (France) Nathalie Tauziat (semifinals)

== Draw ==
=== Key ===
- Q = Qualifier
- WC = Wild card
- LL = Lucky loser
- Alt = Alternate
- ITF = ITF entry
- PR = Protected ranking
- SR = Special ranking
- SE = Special exempt
- JE = Junior exempt
- JR = Junior Accelerator Programme entrant
- CO = College Accelerator Programme entrant
- NG = Next Gen Accelerator Program entrant
- w/o = Walkover
- r = Retired
- d = Defaulted

First round
1	(Czechoslovakia) J Novotná (France) C Suire	**6**	4	3
(Italy) **R Reggi** (South Africa) **E Reinach**	0	**6**	**6**
(West Germany) I Cueto (Spain) A Sánchez	5	2
(New Zealand) **B Cordwell** (South Africa) **D van Rensburg**	**7**	**6**
4	(France) **I Demongeot** (France) **N Tauziat**	**6**	**6**
(Czechoslovakia) P Langrová (Czechoslovakia) J Pospíšilová	3	1
(Czechoslovakia) I Budařová (Socialist Federal Republic of Yugoslavia) S Goleš	0	3
(United Kingdom) **J Durie** (United States) **S Walsh-Pete**	**6**	**6**
(Austria) B Paulus (West Germany) C Porwik	6	**6**	1
(France) **S Amiach** (Sweden) **M Strandlund**	**7**	1	**6**
(West Germany) S Meier (West Germany) C Singer	**6**	2	3
3	(France) **N Herreman** (France) **C Tanvier**	3	**6**	**6**
(West Germany) S Hanika (Austria) J Wiesner	**6**	4	6
(Poland) **I Kuczyńska** (United States) **M Navratilova**	4	**6**	**7**
(West Germany) **C Schneider** (Switzerland) **M Strebel**	**6**
2	(Sweden) C Lindqvist (Denmark) T Scheuer-Larsen	2	r

Quarterfinals
(Italy) **R Reggi** (South Africa) **E Reinach**	**6**	**6**
(New Zealand) B Cordwell (South Africa) D van Rensburg	4	3
4	(France) **I Demongeot** (France) **N Tauziat**	**6**	5	**6**
(United Kingdom) J Durie (United States) S Walsh-Pete	4	**7**	2
(France) S Amiach (Sweden) M Strandlund	2	5
3	(France) **N Herreman** (France) **C Tanvier**	**6**	**7**
(Poland) **I Kuczyńska** (United States) **M Navratilova**	**6**	**6**
(West Germany) C Schneider (Switzerland) M Strebel	3	3

Semifinals
(Italy) **R Reggi** (South Africa) **E Reinach**	5	**6**	**6**
4	(France) I Demongeot (France) N Tauziat	**7**	4	3
3	(France) N Herreman (France) C Tanvier	1	4
(Poland) **I Kuczyńska** (United States) **M Navratilova**	**6**	**6**

Final
(Italy) Raffaella Reggi (South Africa) Elna Reinach	1	4
(Poland) **Iwona Kuczyńska** (United States) **Martina Navratilova**	**6**	**6**
