= 1995 EA-Generali Ladies Linz – Doubles =

Doubles
- 1995 EA-Generali Ladies Linz
- 1994 Champions: (Russia) Eugenia Maniokova; (Georgia (country)) Leila Meskhi

Final
- Champions: (United States) Meredith McGrath; (France) Nathalie Tauziat
- Runners-up: (Croatia) Iva Majoli; (Austria) Petra Schwarz
- Score: 6–1, 6–2

Details
- Draw: 16
- Seeds: 4

Events
Singles	Doubles
← 1994 ·	EA-Generali Ladies Linz	· 1996 →

Eugenia Maniokova and Leila Meskhi were the defending champions but only Maniokova competed that year with Wiltrud Probst.

Maniokova and Probst lost in the quarterfinals to Elena Makarova and Maja Murić.

Meredith McGrath and Nathalie Tauziat won in the final 6–1, 6–2 against Iva Majoli and Petra Schwarz.

== Seeds ==
Champion seeds are indicated in bold text while text in italics indicates the round in which those seeds were eliminated.

1. (United States) **Meredith McGrath** / (France) **Nathalie Tauziat (champions)**
2. (Russia) Eugenia Maniokova / (Germany) Wiltrud Probst (quarterfinals)
3. (Slovakia) Karina Habšudová / (Netherlands) Caroline Vis (first round)
4. (Italy) Sandra Cecchini / (Germany) Christina Singer (first round)

== Draw ==
=== Key ===
- Q = Qualifier
- WC = Wild card
- LL = Lucky loser
- Alt = Alternate
- ITF = ITF entry
- PR = Protected ranking
- SR = Special ranking
- SE = Special exempt
- JE = Junior exempt
- JR = Junior Accelerator Programme entrant
- CO = College Accelerator Programme entrant
- NG = Next Gen Accelerator Program entrant
- w/o = Walkover
- r = Retired
- d = Defaulted

First round

Quarterfinals

Semifinals

Final

1
- (United States) **M McGrath**
- (France) **N Tauziat**
**6**
**6**

- (Czech Republic) J Pospíšilová
- (Czech Republic) H Vildová
1
2

1
- (United States) **M McGrath**
- (France) **N Tauziat**
**6**
**6**

- (Sweden) **Å Carlsson**
- (Finland) **N Dahlman**
**6**
**6**

- (Sweden) Å Carlsson
- (Finland) N Dahlman
2
1

- (Czech Republic) R Bobková
- (Czech Republic) P Langrová
1
3

1
- (United States) **M McGrath**
- (France) **N Tauziat**
6
**6**
**6**

3
- (Slovakia) K Habšudová
- (Netherlands) C Vis
0
3

- (Belgium) E Callens
- (Romania) R Dragomir
**7**
2
2

- (Belgium) **S Appelmans**
- (Netherlands) **M Oremans**
**6**
**6**

- (Belgium) S Appelmans
- (Netherlands) M Oremans
**7**
2
2

- (France) L Ghirardi
- (Italy) F Perfetti
0
2

- (Belgium) **E Callens**
- (Romania) **R Dragomir**
5
**6**
**6**

- (Belgium) **E Callens**
- (Romania) **R Dragomir**
**6**
**6**

1
- (United States) **Meredith McGrath**
- (France) **Nathalie Tauziat**
**6**
**6**

- (Croatia) **I Majoli**
- (Austria) **P Schwarz**
6
**6**
**6**

- (Croatia) Iva Majoli
- (Austria) Petra Schwarz
1
2

- (Germany) M Babel
- (Germany) B Rittner
**7**
3
4

- (Croatia) **I Majoli**
- (Austria) **P Schwarz**
**w/o**

Q
- (Czech Republic) **L Richterová**
- (Ukraine) **E Tatarkova**
1
**7**
**6**

Q
- (Czech Republic) L Richterová
- (Ukraine) E Tatarkova

4
- (Italy) S Cecchini
- (Germany) C Singer
**6**
5
3

- (Croatia) **I Majoli**
- (Austria) **P Schwarz**
**w/o**

- (Russia) **E Makarova**
- (Croatia) **M Murić**
**7**
**6**

- (Russia) E Makarova
- (Croatia) M Murić

- (Hungary) V Csurgo
- (Slovakia) P Marková
5
1

- (Russia) **E Makarova**
- (Croatia) **M Murić**
**6**
4
**7**

WC
- (Austria) S Reichel
- (Austria) B Schett
4
1

2
- (Russia) E Maniokova
- (Germany) W Probst
3
**6**
5

2
- (Russia) **E Maniokova**
- (Germany) **W Probst**
**6**
**6**
