= 1996 EA-Generali Ladies Linz =

- Date: 26 February – 3 March
- Edition: 10th
- Category: Tier III
- Draw: 32S /16D
- Prize money: $164,250
- Surface: Carpet / indoor
- Location: Linz, Austria
- Venue: Intersport Arena

Champions

Singles
- (Belgium) Sabine Appelmans

Doubles
- (Netherlands) Manon Bollegraf / (United States) Meredith McGrath
← 1995 ·	Linz Open	· 1997 →

The 1996 EA-Generali Ladies Linz was a women's tennis tournament played on indoor carpet courts at the Intersport Arena in Linz in Austria that was part of the Tier III category of the 1996 WTA Tour. It was the tenth edition of the tournament and was held from 26 February until 3 March 1996. Sixth-seeded Sabine Appelmans won the singles title.

== Finals ==
=== Singles ===
(Belgium) Sabine Appelmans defeated (France) Julie Halard-Decugis 6–2, 6–4

- It was Appelmans' only singles title of the year and the 7th and last of her career.

=== Doubles ===
(Netherlands) Manon Bollegraf / (United States) Meredith McGrath defeated (Australia) Rennae Stubbs / (Czech Republic) Helena Suková 6–4, 6–4

- It was Bollegraf's 1st doubles title of the year and the 21st of her career. It was McGrath's 2nd doubles title of the year and the 24th of her career.
