= 1993 International Austrian Indoor Championships – Singles =

Singles
- 1993 International Austrian Indoor Championships

Final
- Champion: (Switzerland) Manuela Maleeva-Fragnière
- Runner-up: (Spain) Conchita Martínez
- Score: 6–2, 1–0, retired

Details
- Draw: 32 (1WC/4Q/2LL)
- Seeds: 8

Events
Singles	Doubles
← 1992 ·	Linz Open	· 1994 →

Natalia Medvedeva was the defending champion, but did not compete this year.

Manuela Maleeva-Fragnière won the title after her opponent, Conchita Martínez, was forced to retire due to a flu during the second set. The score was 6–2, 1–0.

== Seeds ==
1. (Spain) Conchita Martínez (final, retired due to a flu)
2. (Switzerland) Manuela Maleeva-Fragnière (champion)
3. (Austria) Judith Wiesner (semifinals)
4. (Georgia (country)) Leila Meskhi (semifinals)
5. (Switzerland) ~~Emanuela Zardo~~ (withdrew)
6. (Germany) Wiltrud Probst (quarterfinals)
7. (Czech Republic) Andrea Strnadová (first round)
8. (France) Pascale Paradis-Mangon (quarterfinals)

== Draw ==
=== Key ===
- Q = Qualifier
- WC = Wild card
- LL = Lucky loser
- Alt = Alternate
- SE = Special exempt
- PR = Protected ranking
- ITF = ITF entry
- JE = Junior exempt
- w/o = Walkover
- r = Retired
- d = Defaulted
- SR = Special ranking

=== Finals ===
Semifinals
1	(Spain) Conchita Martínez	6	6
4	(Georgia (country)) Leila Meskhi	2	2
3	(Austria) Judith Wiesner	2	0
2	(Switzerland) Manuela Maleeva-Fragnière	6	6

Final
1	(Spain) Conchita Martínez	2	0^{r}
2	(Switzerland) Manuela Maleeva-Fragnière	6	1

=== Top half ===
First round
1	(Spain) C Martínez	6	6
(Russia) E Maniokova	3	0
(Belgium) D Monami	0	6	3
WC	(Slovakia) K Studeníková	6	3	6
Q	(United States) E deLone	7^{9}	2	3
(Romania) R Dragomir	6^{7}	6	6
(Poland) K Nowak	6	2	4
6	(Germany) W Probst	3	6	6
4	(Georgia (country)) L Meskhi	6	6
(Germany) C Porwik	3	0
(France) A Fusai	6	4	4
(Czech Republic) P Langrová	2	6	6
LL	(France) S Sabas	6	7^{7}
Q	(Germany) M Kochta	4	6^{4}
(Italy) N Baudone	7	2	7
7	(Czech Republic) A Strnadová	5	6	5

Second round
1	(Spain) C Martínez	4	6	6
WC	(Slovakia) K Studeníková	6	3	1
(Romania) R Dragomir	3	3
6	(Germany) W Probst	6	6
4	(Georgia (country)) L Meskhi	7	3	7
(Czech Republic) P Langrová	5	6	5
LL	(France) S Sabas	6^{5}	6^{2}
(Italy) N Baudone	7^{7}	7^{7}

Quarterfinals
1	(Spain) C Martínez	6	6
6	(Germany) W Probst	3	4
4	(Georgia (country)) L Meskhi	6	7
(Italy) N Baudone	3	5

Semifinals
1	(Spain) C Martínez	6	6
4	(Georgia (country)) L Meskhi	2	2

=== Bottom half ===
First round
LL	(Austria) H Sprung	5	3
(United Kingdom) J Durie	7	6
Q	(Netherlands) K Boogert	7	6
(Russia) N Bykova-Egorova	5	3
(Italy) L Golarsa	6	7
(Ukraine) E Brioukhovets	4	5
(Finland) P Thorén	6	2	4
3	(Austria) J Wiesner	1	6	6
8	(France) P Paradis-Mangon	6	3	6
Q	(Germany) K Oeljeklaus	3	6	2
(Germany) S Meier	6	7^{7}
(France) C Mothes	1	6^{5}
(Austria) S Dopfer	7	5	6^{2}
(Germany) C Singer	5	7	7^{7}
(France) N van Lottum	0	3
2	(Switzerland) M Maleeva-Fragnière	6	6

Second round
(United Kingdom) J Durie	5	4
Q	(Netherlands) K Boogert	7	6
(Italy) L Golarsa	3	3
3	(Austria) J Wiesner	6	6
8	(France) P Paradis-Mangon	6	5	6
(Germany) S Meier	1	7	0
(Germany) C Singer	3	3
2	(Switzerland) M Maleeva-Fragnière	6	6

Quarterfinals
Q	(Netherlands) K Boogert	7	1	2
3	(Austria) J Wiesner	5	6	6
8	(France) P Paradis-Mangon	6	4	2
2	(Switzerland) M Maleeva-Fragnière	3	6	6

Semifinals
3	(Austria) J Wiesner	2	0
2	(Switzerland) M Maleeva-Fragnière	6	6
