= 1989 Porsche Tennis Grand Prix =

- Date: 9–15 October
- Edition: 12th
- Category: Category 4
- Draw: 32S / 16D
- Prize money: $250,000
- Surface: Carpet / indoor
- Location: Filderstadt, West Germany
- Venue: Filderstadt Tennis Centre

Champions

Singles
- (Argentina) Gabriela Sabatini

Doubles
- (United States) Gigi Fernández / (United States) Robin White
← 1988 ·	Porsche Tennis Grand Prix	· 1990 →

The 1989 Porsche Tennis Grand Prix was a women's tennis tournament played on indoor carpet courts at the Filderstadt Tennis Centre in Filderstadt, West Germany and was part of the Category 4 tier of the 1989 WTA Tour. It was the 12th edition of the tournament and was held from 9 October to 15 October 1989. First-seeded Gabriela Sabatini won the singles title.

== Finals ==
=== Singles ===
(Argentina) Gabriela Sabatini defeated (United States) Mary Joe Fernández 7–6^{(7–5)}, 6–4

- It was Sabatini's 4th singles title of the year and the 13th of her career.

=== Doubles ===
(United States) Gigi Fernández / (United States) Robin White defeated (Italy) Raffaella Reggi / (South Africa) Elna Reinach 6–4, 7–6^{(7–2)}

== Prize money ==
Event	W	F	SF	QF	Round of 16	Round of 32
Singles	$50,000	$22,500	$11,250	$5,650	$2,850	$1,475
