= 1989 Porsche Tennis Grand Prix – Singles =

Singles
- 1989 Porsche Tennis Grand Prix

Final
- Champion: (Argentina) Gabriela Sabatini
- Runner-up: (United States) Mary Joe Fernández
- Score: 7–6^{(7–5)}, 6–4

Details
- Draw: 32 (2WC/4Q)
- Seeds: 8

Events
Singles	Doubles
← 1988 ·	Women's Stuttgart Open	· 1990 →

Martina Navratilova was the three-time defending champion, but did not compete this year.

Gabriela Sabatini won the title by defeating Mary Joe Fernández 7–6^{(7–5)}, 6–4 in the final. As a result, Sabatini won a Porsche 944 S2 for winning the tournament.

== Seeds ==
1. (Argentina) Gabriela Sabatini (champion)
2. (United States) Zina Garrison (semifinals)
3. (Czechoslovakia) Helena Suková (first round)
4. (Socialist Federal Republic of Yugoslavia) Monica Seles (quarterfinals)
5. (United States) Mary Joe Fernández (final)
6. (Australia) Hana Mandlíková (quarterfinals)
7. (Italy) Raffaella Reggi (second round)
8. (Austria) Barbara Paulus (first round)

== Draw ==
=== Key ===
- Q = Qualifier
- WC = Wild card
- LL = Lucky loser
- Alt = Alternate
- SE = Special exempt
- PR = Protected ranking
- ITF = ITF entry
- JE = Junior exempt
- w/o = Walkover
- r = Retired
- d = Defaulted
- SR = Special ranking

=== Finals ===
Semifinals
1	(Argentina) Gabriela Sabatini	6	6
(Peru) Laura Gildemeister	1	2
5	(United States) Mary Joe Fernández	3	6	7
2	(United States) Zina Garrison	6	4	5

Final
1	(Argentina) Gabriela Sabatini	7^{7}	6
5	(United States) Mary Joe Fernández	6^{5}	4

=== Top half ===
First round
1	(Argentina) G Sabatini	6	6
(France) N Tauziat	2	1
Q	(France) E Derly	5	7^{7}	0
(Sweden) C Dahlman	7	6^{4}	6
(France) C Tanvier	6	6
WC	(West Germany) E Pfaff	0	1
(France) K Quentrec	4	3
6	(Australia) H Mandlikova	6	6
3	(Czechoslovakia) H Suková	3	2
(Czechoslovakia) R Zrubáková	6	6
(Czechoslovakia) R Rajchrtová	7	1	2
(United States) R White	5	6	6
(Argentina) M Paz	1	4
(Austria) J Wiesner	6	6
(Peru) L Gildemeister	6	6
8	(Austria) B Paulus	4	2

Second round
1	(Argentina) G Sabatini	6	6
(Sweden) C Dahlman	2	0
(France) C Tanvier	5	6	4
6	(Australia) H Mandlikova	7	4	6
(Czechoslovakia) R Zrubáková	7^{7}	2	6
(United States) R White	6^{4}	6	1
(Austria) J Wiesner	2	6	5
(Peru) L Gildemeister	6	1	7

Quarterfinals
1	(Argentina) G Sabatini	6	6
6	(Australia) H Mandlikova	3	0
(Czechoslovakia) R Zrubáková	4	6	5
(Peru) L Gildemeister	6	2	7

Semifinals
1	(Argentina) G Sabatini	6	6
(Peru) L Gildemeister	1	2

=== Bottom half ===
First round
5	(United States) MJ Fernández	6	6
Q	(France) P Etchemendy	4	2
(Belgium) S Wasserman	6	6
(Argentina) P Tarabini	2	2
(West Germany) S Hanika	6	4	7^{7}
(United States) L McNeil	2	6	6^{4}
(Netherlands) B Schultz	6	3	4
4	(Socialist Federal Republic of Yugoslavia) M Seles	4	6	6
7	(Italy) R Reggi	6	6
Q	(West Germany) W Probst	2	0
(United States) G Fernández	6	6
(United States) A Henricksson	3	3
Q	(South Africa) D Van Rensburg	7	6
WC	(West Germany) C Porwik	5	3
(South Africa) E Reinach	4	1
2	(United States) Z Garrison	6	6

Second round
5	(United States) MJ Fernández	6	6
(Belgium) S Wasserman	1	0
(West Germany) S Hanika	3	4
4	(Socialist Federal Republic of Yugoslavia) M Seles	6	6
7	(Italy) R Reggi	1	3
(United States) G Fernández	6	6
Q	(South Africa) D Van Rensburg	6	1	1
2	(United States) Z Garrison	2	6	6

Quarterfinals
5	(United States) MJ Fernández	6	4	7^{7}
4	(Socialist Federal Republic of Yugoslavia) M Seles	4	6	6^{5}
(United States) G Fernández	4	2
2	(United States) Z Garrison	6	6

Semifinals
5	(United States) MJ Fernández	3	6	7
2	(United States) Z Garrison	6	4	5
