= 1995 EA-Generali Ladies Linz =

- Date: 20–26 February
- Edition: 9th
- Category: Tier III
- Draw: 32S / 16D
- Prize money: $161,250
- Surface: Carpet / indoor
- Location: Linz, Austria
- Venue: Intersport Arena

Champions

Singles
- (Czech Republic) Jana Novotná

Doubles
- (United States) Meredith McGrath / (France) Nathalie Tauziat
← 1994 ·	Linz Open	· 1996 →

The 1995 EA-Generali Ladies Linz was a women's tennis tournament played on indoor carpet courts at the Intersport Arena in Linz, Austria that was part of Tier III of the 1995 WTA Tour. It was the 9th edition of the tournament was held from 20 February through 26 February 1995. First-seeded Jana Novotná won the singles title and earned $26,500 first-prize money.

== Finals ==
=== Singles ===
(Czech Republic) Jana Novotná defeated (Germany) Barbara Rittner 6–7, 6–3, 6–4

- It was Novotná's only singles title of the year and the 11th of her career.

=== Doubles ===
(United States) Meredith McGrath / (France) Nathalie Tauziat defeated (Croatia) Iva Majoli / (Austria) Petra Schwarz 6–1, 6–2

- It was McGrath's 2nd title of the year and the 20th of her career. It was Tauziat's 1st title of the year and the 12th of her career.
