= 1994 EA-Generali Ladies Linz =

- Date: 7–13 February
- Edition: 8th
- Category: Tier III
- Draw: 32S / 16D
- Prize money: $150,000
- Surface: Carpet / indoor
- Location: Linz, Austria
- Venue: Intersport Arena

Champions

Singles
- (Belgium) Sabine Appelmans

Doubles
- (Russia) Eugenia Maniokova / (Georgia (country)) Leila Meskhi
← 1993 ·	Linz Open	· 1995 →

The 1994 EA-Generali Ladies Linz was a women's tennis tournament played on indoor carpet courts at the Intersport Arena in Linz, Austria that was part of Tier III of the 1994 WTA Tour. It was the 8th edition of the tournament and was held from 7 February through 13 February 1994. Fifth-seeded Sabine Appelmans won the singles title.

== Finals ==
=== Singles ===
(Belgium) Sabine Appelmans defeated (Germany) Meike Babel 6–1, 4–6, 7–6

- It was Appelmans' 1st singles title of the year and the 4th of her career.

=== Doubles ===
(Russia) Eugenia Maniokova / (Georgia (country)) Leila Meskhi defeated (Sweden) Åsa Carlsson / (Germany) Caroline Schneider 6–2, 6–2

- It was Maniokova's 1st title of the year and the 3rd of her career. It was Meskhi's only title of the year and the 9th of her career.
