= 1991 Austrian Tennis Grand Prix – Doubles =

Doubles
- 1991 Austrian Tennis Grand Prix

Final
- Champions: (Switzerland) Manuela Maleeva-Fragnière (Italy) Raffaella Reggi
- Runners-up: (Czechoslovakia) Petra Langrová (Czechoslovakia) Radka Zrubáková
- Score: 6–4, 1–6, 6–3

Details
- Draw: 16 (1WC/1Q)
- Seeds: 4

Events
Singles	Doubles
← 1990 ·	Linz Open	· 1992 →

Alexia Dechaume and Pascale Paradis were the defending champions, but Dechaume did not compete this year. Paradis teamed up with Sandrine Testud and lost in the semifinals to Petra Langrová and Radka Zrubáková.

Manuela Maleeva-Fragnière and Raffaella Reggi won the title by defeating Langrová and Zrubáková 6–4, 1–6, 6–3 in the final.

== Seeds ==
1. (Germany) Claudia Kohde-Kilsch / (Germany) Eva Pfaff (first round)
2. (Switzerland) Manuela Maleeva-Fragnière / (Italy) Raffaella Reggi (champions)
3. (Czechoslovakia) Petra Langrová / (Czechoslovakia) Radka Zrubáková (final)
4. (Czechoslovakia) Iva Budařová / (Czechoslovakia) Regina Rajchrtová (quarterfinals)

== Draw ==
=== Key ===
- Q = Qualifier
- WC = Wild card
- LL = Lucky loser
- Alt = Alternate
- SE = Special exempt
- PR = Protected ranking
- ITF = ITF entry
- JE = Junior exempt
- w/o = Walkover
- r = Retired
- d = Defaulted
- SR = Special ranking

=== Draw ===
First round
1	(Germany) C Kohde-Kilsch (Germany) E Pfaff	6^{3}	7^{7}	5
(France) P Paradis (France) S Testud	7^{7}	6^{3}	7
WC	(Switzerland) C Cohen (Austria) S Reichel	3	5
(Finland) A Aallonen (Netherlands) S Schilder	6	7
3	(Czechoslovakia) P Langrová (Czechoslovakia) R Zrubáková	3	7^{7}	6
(Soviet Union) A Blumberga (Finland) P Thorén	6	6^{2}	2
(Germany) S Meier (Bulgaria) E Pampoulova	4	4
(Netherlands) G Coorengel (Netherlands) A van Buuren	6	6
(Germany) C Schneider (Peru) P Vásquez	2	2
(Czechoslovakia) L Lásková (Czechoslovakia) A Noháčová	6	6
(Spain) A Segura (Austria) H Sprung	4	4
4	(Czechoslovakia) I Budařová (Czechoslovakia) R Rajchrtová	6	6
Q	(Czechoslovakia) R Bobková (Sweden) J Jonerup	7^{7}	5	7
(Brazil) L Corsato (Spain) V Ruano Pascual	6^{0}	7	5
(Soviet Union) E Maniokova (Soviet Union) V Milvidskaia	4	4
2	(Switzerland) M Maleeva-Fragnière (Italy) R Reggi	6	6

Quarterfinals
(France) P Paradis (France) S Testud	6	4	6
(Finland) A Aallonen (Netherlands) S Schilder	4	6	4
3	(Czechoslovakia) P Langrová (Czechoslovakia) R Zrubáková	7	4	6
(Netherlands) G Coorengel (Netherlands) A van Buuren	5	6	1
(Czechoslovakia) L Lásková (Czechoslovakia) A Noháčová	7^{9}	4	6
4	(Czechoslovakia) I Budařová (Czechoslovakia) R Rajchrtová	6^{7}	6	1
Q	(Czechoslovakia) R Bobková (Sweden) J Jonerup	5	0
2	(Switzerland) M Maleeva-Fragnière (Italy) R Reggi	7	6

Semifinals
(France) P Paradis (France) S Testud	6	2	3
3	(Czechoslovakia) P Langrová (Czechoslovakia) R Zrubáková	3	6	6
(Czechoslovakia) L Lásková (Czechoslovakia) A Noháčová	3	3
2	(Switzerland) M Maleeva-Fragnière (Italy) R Reggi	6	6

Final
3	(Czechoslovakia) P Langrová (Czechoslovakia) R Zrubáková	4	6	3
2	(Switzerland) M Maleeva-Fragnière (Italy) R Reggi	6	1	6
