= 1987 Porsche Tennis Grand Prix – Doubles =

Doubles
- 1987 Porsche Tennis Grand Prix

Final
- Champions: (United States) Martina Navratilova (United States) Pam Shriver
- Runners-up: (United States) Zina Garrison (United States) Lori McNeil
- Score: 6–1, 6–2

Details
- Draw: 16
- Seeds: 4

Events
Singles	Doubles
- Women's Stuttgart Open

Martina Navratilova and Pam Shriver successfully defended their title by defeating Zina Garrison and Lori McNeil 6–1, 6–2 in the final.

== Seeds ==
1. (United States) Martina Navratilova / (United States) Pam Shriver (champions)
2. (United States) Kathy Jordan / (Czechoslovakia) Helena Suková (semifinals)
3. (United States) Zina Garrison / (United States) Lori McNeil (final)
4. (Soviet Union) Svetlana Parkhomenko / (Soviet Union) Larisa Savchenko (semifinals)

== Draw ==
Key

- Q = Qualifier
- WC = Wild card
- LL = Lucky loser
- Alt = Alternate
- ITF = ITF entry
- PR = Protected ranking
- SR = Special ranking
- SE = Special exempt
- JE = Junior exempt
- JR = Junior Accelerator Programme entrant
- CO = College Accelerator Programme entrant
- NG = Next Gen Accelerator Program entrant
- w/o = Walkover
- r = Retired
- d = Defaulted

=== Draw ===
First round
1	(United States) M Navratilova (United States) P Shriver	6	6
(France) C Tanvier (Romania) V Ruzici	4	4
(France) I Demongeot (France) N Tauziat	6	6
(United States) E Burgin (South Africa) R Fairbank	4	2
4	(Soviet Union) S Parkhomenko (Soviet Union) L Savchenko	6	6
(West Germany) E Pfaff (Argentina) G Sabatini	1	4
(West Germany) A Betzner (West Germany) C Singer	6	6	7
(Czechoslovakia) J Novotná (France) C Suire	7	4	6
(Czechoslovakia) R Maršíková (Czechoslovakia) R Zrubáková	2	2
(Sweden) C Karlsson (Denmark) T Scheuer-Larsen	6	6
(Czechoslovakia) I Budařová (United States) A Henricksson	3	2
3	(United States) Z Garrison (United States) L McNeil	6	6
(United States) MJ Fernandez (France) N Herreman	6	7
(Austria) B Paulus (Austria) B Reinstadler	0	5
(Australia) N Provis (Italy) R Reggi	1	1
2	(United States) K Jordan (Czechoslovakia) H Suková	6	6

Quarterfinals
1	(United States) M Navratilova (United States) P Shriver	6	6
(France) I Demongeot (France) N Tauziat	1	3
4	(Soviet Union) S Parkhomenko (Soviet Union) L Savchenko	6	6
(West Germany) A Betzner (West Germany) C Singer	4	4
(Sweden) C Karlsson (Denmark) T Scheuer-Larsen	2	5
3	(United States) Z Garrison (United States) L McNeil	6	7
(United States) MJ Fernandez (France) N Herreman	2	2
2	(United States) K Jordan (Czechoslovakia) H Suková	6	6

Semifinals
1	(United States) M Navratilova (United States) P Shriver	6	6
4	(Soviet Union) S Parkhomenko (Soviet Union) L Savchenko	4	1
3	(United States) Z Garrison (United States) L McNeil	6	7	6
2	(United States) K Jordan (Czechoslovakia) H Suková	7	6	4

Final
1	(United States) M Navratilova (United States) P Shriver	6	6
3	(United States) Z Garrison (United States) L McNeil	1	2
