= 1987 Porsche Tennis Grand Prix – Singles =

Singles
- 1987 Porsche Tennis Grand Prix

Final
- Champion: (United States) Martina Navratilova
- Runner-up: (United States) Chris Evert
- Score: 7–5, 6–1

Details
- Draw: 32 (4Q)
- Seeds: 8

Events
Singles	Doubles
- Women's Stuttgart Open

Martina Navratilova successfully defended her title by defeating Chris Evert 7–5, 6–1 in the final. As a result, she won a Porsche 911 Carrera Cabriolet.

== Seeds ==
1. (United States) Martina Navratilova (champion)
2. (United States) Chris Evert (final)
3. (United States) Pam Shriver (semifinals)
4. (Czechoslovakia) Helena Suková (quarterfinals)
5. (Argentina) Gabriela Sabatini (semifinals)
6. (United States) Zina Garrison (quarterfinals)
7. (United States) Lori McNeil (quarterfinals)
8. (West Germany) Bettina Bunge (second round)

== Draw ==
Key

- Q = Qualifier
- WC = Wild card
- LL = Lucky loser
- Alt = Alternate
- ITF = ITF entry
- PR = Protected ranking
- SR = Special ranking
- SE = Special exempt
- JE = Junior exempt
- JR = Junior Accelerator Programme entrant
- CO = College Accelerator Programme entrant
- NG = Next Gen Accelerator Program entrant
- w/o = Walkover
- r = Retired
- d = Defaulted

=== Finals ===
Semifinals
1	(United States) Martina Navratilova	6	6
5	(Argentina) Gabriela Sabatini	2	2
3	(United States) Pam Shriver	5	3
2	(United States) Chris Evert	7	6

Final
1	(United States) Martina Navratilova	7	6
2	(United States) Chris Evert	5	1

=== Top half ===
First round
1	(United States) M Navratilova	6	6
(South Africa) R Fairbank	1	4
(France) I Demongeot	6	6
(Soviet Union) L Savchenko	3	3
(Austria) J Wiesner	3	1
(United States) K Jordan	6	6
Q	(Czechoslovakia) I Budařová	4	0
7	(United States) L McNeil	6	6
4	(Czechoslovakia) H Suková	5	6	6
(West Germany) E Pfaff	7	4	1
(France) N Tauziat	7	6
(Romania) V Ruzici	5	1
(France) C Tanvier	3	6	0
(West Germany) S Meier	6	4	6
(West Germany) S Hanika	2	1
5	(Argentina) G Sabatini	6	6

Second round
1	(United States) M Navratilova	6	6
(France) I Demongeot	2	0
(United States) K Jordan	3	6	2
7	(United States) L McNeil	6	4	6
4	(Czechoslovakia) H Suková	6	6
(France) N Tauziat	2	4
(West Germany) S Meier	2	2
5	(Argentina) G Sabatini	6	6

Quarterfinals
1	(United States) M Navratilova	6	6
7	(United States) L McNeil	4	2
4	(Czechoslovakia) H Suková	7	6	3
5	(Argentina) G Sabatini	6	7	6

Semifinals
1	(United States) M Navratilova	6	6
5	(Argentina) G Sabatini	2	2

=== Bottom half ===
First round
6	(United States) Z Garrison	6	6
Q	(United States) E Burgin	3	3
Q	(Denmark) T Scheuer-Larsen	4	6
(France) N Herreman	6	7
(Czechoslovakia) J Novotná	3	6	7
(United States) A Henricksson	6	2	6
Q	(West Germany) C Porwik	3	2
3	(United States) P Shriver	6	6
8	(West Germany) B Bunge	7	7
(West Germany) I Cueto	5	5
(United States) L Bonder	3	6	4
(United States) MJ Fernandez	6	4	6
(United Kingdom) J Durie	2	4
(Italy) R Reggi	6	6
Q	(Czechoslovakia) R Maršíková	2	5
2	(United States) C Evert	6	7

Second round
6	(United States) Z Garrison	6	6
(France) N Herreman	1	0
(Czechoslovakia) J Novotná	2	5
3	(United States) P Shriver	6	7
8	(West Germany) B Bunge	3	1
(United States) MJ Fernandez	6	6
(Italy) R Reggi	4	1
2	(United States) C Evert	6	6

Quarterfinals
6	(United States) Z Garrison	4	2
3	(United States) P Shriver	6	6
(United States) MJ Fernandez	2	7	4
2	(United States) C Evert	6	5	6

Semifinals
3	(United States) P Shriver	5	3
2	(United States) C Evert	7	6
