= 1996 EA-Generali Ladies Linz – Doubles =

Doubles
- 1996 EA-Generali Ladies Linz

Final
- Champions: (Netherlands) Manon Bollegraf (United States) Meredith McGrath
- Runners-up: (Australia) Rennae Stubbs (Czech Republic) Helena Suková
- Score: 6–4, 6–4

Details
- Draw: 16
- Seeds: 4

Events
Singles	Doubles
← 1995 ·	Linz Open	· 1997 →

Meredith McGrath and Nathalie Tauziat were the defending champions but only McGrath competed that year with Manon Bollegraf.

Bollegraf and McGrath won in the final 6–4, 6–4 against Rennae Stubbs and Helena Suková.

== Seeds ==
Champion seeds are indicated in bold text while text in italics indicates the round in which those seeds were eliminated.

1. (Netherlands) **Manon Bollegraf** / (United States) **Meredith McGrath (champions)**
2. (Australia) Rennae Stubbs / (Czech Republic) Helena Suková (final)
3. (Belgium) Els Callens / (Belgium) Laurence Courtois (semifinals)
4. (France) Alexandra Fusai / (Germany) Karin Kschwendt (first round)

== Draw ==
=== Key ===
- Q = Qualifier
- WC = Wild card
- LL = Lucky loser
- Alt = Alternate
- ITF = ITF entry
- PR = Protected ranking
- SR = Special ranking
- SE = Special exempt
- JE = Junior exempt
- JR = Junior Accelerator Programme entrant
- CO = College Accelerator Programme entrant
- NG = Next Gen Accelerator Program entrant
- w/o = Walkover
- r = Retired
- d = Defaulted

First round
1	(Netherlands) **M Bollegraf** (United States) **M McGrath**	**6**	2	**6**
(Belgium) S Appelmans (Netherlands) M Oremans	2	**6**	4
(Finland) N Dahlman (Czech Republic) L Němečková	2	6
WC	(France) **J Halard-Decugis** (Bulgaria) **M Maleeva**	**6**	**7**
3	(Belgium) **E Callens** (Belgium) **L Courtois**	3	**6**	**6**
(Austria) B Schwartz (Slovakia) K Studeníková	**6**	4	2
(Italy) S Cecchini (Italy) L Garrone	5	3
(Slovakia) **D Krajčovičová** (Czech Republic) **P Langrová**	**7**	**6**
(Italy) S Farina (Germany) C Porwik	3	3
(Ukraine) **O Lugina** (Ukraine) **N Medvedeva**	**6**	**6**
(Germany) **W Probst** (Germany) **C Singer**	**6**	2	**7**
4	(France) A Fusai (Germany) K Kschwendt	2	**6**	5
Q	(Netherlands) **S Noorlander** (Netherlands) **S Rottier**	**6**	**7**
(Russia) E Makarova (Russia) E Maniokova	4	6
LL	(Austria) B Schett (Austria) M Schnell	1	2
2	(Australia) **R Stubbs** (Czech Republic) **H Suková**	**6**	**6**

Quarterfinals
1	(Netherlands) **M Bollegraf** (United States) **M McGrath**	**w/o**
WC	(France) J Halard-Decugis (Bulgaria) M Maleeva
3	(Belgium) **E Callens** (Belgium) **L Courtois**	**6**	**6**
(Slovakia) D Krajčovičová (Czech Republic) P Langrová	3	2
(Ukraine) O Lugina (Ukraine) N Medvedeva	**6**	6	4
(Germany) **W Probst** (Germany) **C Singer**	2	**7**	**6**
Q	(Netherlands) S Noorlander (Netherlands) S Rottier	5	3
2	(Australia) **R Stubbs** (Czech Republic) **H Suková**	**7**	**6**

Semifinals
1	(Netherlands) **M Bollegraf** (United States) **M McGrath**	**6**	**6**
3	(Belgium) E Callens (Belgium) L Courtois	4	2
(Germany) W Probst (Germany) C Singer	3	1
2	(Australia) **R Stubbs** (Czech Republic) **H Suková**	**6**	**6**

Final
1	(Netherlands) **Manon Bollegraf** (United States) **Meredith McGrath**	**6**	**6**
2	(Australia) Rennae Stubbs (Czech Republic) Helena Suková	4	4
