= 1989 Porsche Tennis Grand Prix – Doubles =

Doubles
- 1989 Porsche Tennis Grand Prix

Final
- Champions: (United States) Gigi Fernández (United States) Robin White
- Runners-up: (Italy) Raffaella Reggi (South Africa) Elna Reinach
- Score: 6–4, 7–6^{(7–2)}

Details
- Draw: 16 (1WC)
- Seeds: 4

Events
Singles	Doubles
← 1988 ·	Women's Stuttgart Open	· 1990 →

Iwona Kuczyńska and Martina Navratilova were the defending champions, but none competed this year. Navratilova opted to rest after competing at the Federation Cup during the previous week.

Gigi Fernández and Robin White won the title by defeating Raffaella Reggi and Elna Reinach 6–4, 7–6^{(7–2)} in the final.

== Seeds ==
1. (United States) Zina Garrison / (Czechoslovakia) Helena Suková (first round)
2. (United States) Gigi Fernández / (United States) Robin White (champions)
3. (United States) Mary Joe Fernández / (West Germany) Claudia Kohde-Kilsch (semifinals)
4. (Australia) Hana Mandlíková / (Netherlands) Brenda Schultz (semifinals)

== Draw ==
=== Key ===
- Q = Qualifier
- WC = Wild card
- LL = Lucky loser
- Alt = Alternate
- SE = Special exempt
- PR = Protected ranking
- ITF = ITF entry
- JE = Junior exempt
- w/o = Walkover
- r = Retired
- d = Defaulted
- SR = Special ranking

=== Draw ===
First round
1	(United States) Z Garrison (Czechoslovakia) H Suková	6	1	4
(Argentina) M Paz (Argentina) P Tarabini	2	6	6
(Italy) R Reggi (South Africa) E Reinach	6	4	6
(West Germany) S Meier (Austria) H Sprung	1	6	2
3	(United States) MJ Fernández (West Germany) C Kohde-Kilsch	7	6
WC	(West Germany) H Kadzidroga (West Germany) S Menning	5	1
(United Kingdom) J Salmon (United Kingdom) A Simpkin	3	4
(Austria) B Paulus (Czechoslovakia) R Zrubáková	6	6
(France) A Dechaume (France) E Derly	5	6	7
(Peru) L Gildemeister (United States) J Smoller	7	4	5
(France) N Tauziat (Austria) J Wiesner	3	6	2
4	(Australia) H Mandlíková (Netherlands) B Schultz	6	4	6
(United States) A Henricksson (United States) L McNeil	7	6
(Denmark) T Scheuer-Larsen (France) C Tanvier	5	4
(Austria) P Ritter (West Germany) EM Schürhoff	6^{1}	3
2	(United States) G Fernández (United States) R White	7^{7}	6

Quarterfinals
(Argentina) M Paz (Argentina) P Tarabini	6^{2}	0
(Italy) R Reggi (South Africa) E Reinach	7^{7}	6
3	(United States) MJ Fernández (West Germany) C Kohde-Kilsch	6	6
(Austria) B Paulus (Czechoslovakia) R Zrubáková	1	0
(France) A Dechaume (France) E Derly
4	(Australia) H Mandlíková (Netherlands) B Schultz	w/o
(United States) A Henricksson (United States) L McNeil	6	3	2
2	(United States) G Fernández (United States) R White	3	6	6

Semifinals
(Italy) R Reggi (South Africa) E Reinach	6	7^{7}
3	(United States) MJ Fernández (West Germany) C Kohde-Kilsch	3	6^{3}
4	(Australia) H Mandlíková (Netherlands) B Schultz	4	6^{4}
2	(United States) G Fernández (United States) R White	6	7^{7}

Final
(Italy) R Reggi (South Africa) E Reinach	4	6^{2}
2	(United States) G Fernández (United States) R White	6	7^{7}
