= WTA Bayonne =

Defunct tennis tournament
- Event name: Whirlpool Open
- Tour: WTA Tour
- Founded: 1989
- Abolished: 1992
- Editions: 4
- Location: Bayonne, France
- Category: Category 2 (1989); WTA Tier V (1990); WTA Tier IV (1991–1992)
- Surface: Hard (1989); Carpet (1990–1992)

The WTA Bayonne was a WTA Tour affiliated women's tennis tournament held from 1989 until 1992 in Bayonne, France. It was also known as the Whirlpool Open, owing to its sponsor in 1991 and 1992.

During the event's first two years there was a total of US$100,000 on offer to players; during the final two years, when it was upgraded from a WTA Tier V to a WTA Tier IV event, the total prize fund was increased to $150,000. The inaugural event was held on indoor hard courts; the final three were played on indoor carpet courts. The tournaments were held in either late September or October.

== Past results ==
=== Singles ===
Year	Tournament name	Champions	Runners-up	Score
1989	Open de la Côte Basque	(Bulgaria) Katerina Maleeva	(Spain) Conchita Martínez	6–2, 6–2
1990	Tournoi de Bayonne	(France) Nathalie Tauziat	(West Germany) Anke Huber	6–3, 7–6
1991	Open Whirlpool - Ville de Bayonne	(Switzerland) Manuela Maleeva-Fragnière	(Georgia (country)) Leila Meskhi	4–6, 6–3, 6–4
1992	Open Whirlpool - Ville de Bayonne	(Switzerland) Manuela Maleeva-Fragnière	(France) Nathalie Tauziat	6–7, 6–2, 6–3

=== Doubles ===
Year	Champions	Runners-up	Score
1989	(Netherlands) Manon Bollegraf (France) Catherine Tanvier	(Italy) Raffaella Reggi (South Africa) Elna Reinach	7–6, 7–5
1990	(Australia) Louise Field (France) Catherine Tanvier	(Australia) Jo-Anne Faull (Australia) Rachel McQuillan	7–6, 6–7, 7–6
1991	(Argentina) Patricia Tarabini (France) Nathalie Tauziat	(Australia) Rachel McQuillan (France) Catherine Tanvier	6–3 ret.
1992	(Italy) Linda Ferrando (Czechoslovakia) Petra Langrová	(West Germany) Claudia Kohde-Kilsch (United States) Stephanie Rehe	1–6, 6–3, 6–4
