= 1996 EA-Generali Ladies Linz – Singles =

Singles
- 1996 EA-Generali Ladies Linz
- 1995 Champion: (Czech Republic) Jana Novotná

Final
- Champion: (Belgium) Sabine Appelmans
- Runner-up: (France) Julie Halard-Decugis
- Score: 6–4, 6–2

Details
- Draw: 32
- Seeds: 8

Events
Singles	Doubles
← 1995 ·	Linz Open	· 1997 →

Jana Novotná was the defending champion but lost in the quarterfinals to Sabine Appelmans.

Appelmans won in the final 6–4, 6–2 against Julie Halard-Decugis.

== Seeds ==
A champion seed is indicated in bold text while text in italics indicates the round in which that seed was eliminated.

1. (Bulgaria) Magdalena Maleeva (second round)
2. (Czech Republic) Jana Novotná (quarterfinals)
3. (France) Julie Halard-Decugis (final)
4. (Czech Republic) Helena Suková (semifinals)
5. (Austria) Judith Wiesner (quarterfinals)
6. (Belgium) **Sabine Appelmans (champion)**
7. (Sweden) Åsa Carlsson (quarterfinals)
8. (Italy) Silvia Farina (second round)

== Draw ==
=== Key ===
- Q = Qualifier
- WC = Wild card
- LL = Lucky loser
- Alt = Alternate
- ITF = ITF entry
- PR = Protected ranking
- SR = Special ranking
- SE = Special exempt
- JE = Junior exempt
- JR = Junior Accelerator Programme entrant
- CO = College Accelerator Programme entrant
- NG = Next Gen Accelerator Program entrant
- w/o = Walkover
- r = Retired
- d = Defaulted

First round
1	(Bulgaria) **M Maleeva**	**6**	**6**
Q	(Netherlands) C Vis	3	4
(Belgium) **L Courtois**	**6**	2	**6**
(Poland) M Grzybowska	3	**6**	2
(Belgium) E Callens	6	2
(Russia) **E Makarova**	**7**	**6**
Q	(Ukraine) O Lugina	4	4
8	(Italy) **S Farina**	**6**	**6**
3	(France) **J Halard-Decugis**	**6**	**6**
(Austria) B Schett	4	4
(Austria) B Reinstadler	4	3
(Ukraine) **N Medvedeva**	**6**	**6**
(France) S Pitkowski	3	0
(Germany) **K Kschwendt**	**6**	**6**
(Slovakia) K Habšudová	2	4
5	(Austria) **J Wiesner**	**6**	**6**
7	(Sweden) **Å Carlsson**	2	**6**	**6**
Q	(Austria) B Schwartz	**6**	3	4
(Australia) R Stubbs	3	**6**	4
WC	(Austria) **P Schwarz**	**6**	2	**6**
(Netherlands) **S Rottier**	2	**6**	**6**
(Germany) C Singer	**6**	2	0
(Germany) J Kandarr	2	2
4	(Czech Republic) **H Suková**	**6**	**6**
6	(Belgium) **S Appelmans**	**6**	3	**6**
WC	(Austria) M Schnell	3	**6**	3
(United States) M McGrath	4	3
(Netherlands) **M Oremans**	**6**	**6**
(Slovakia) **K Studeníková**	**6**	**6**
(Belgium) D Van Roost	4	3
LL	(Germany) W Probst	2	1
2	(Czech Republic) **J Novotná**	**6**	**6**

Second round
1	(Bulgaria) M Maleeva
(Belgium) **L Courtois**	**w/o**
(Russia) **E Makarova**	**6**	**6**
8	(Italy) S Farina	4	4
3	(France) **J Halard-Decugis**	**7**	**6**
(Ukraine) N Medvedeva	5	1
(Germany) K Kschwendt	5	2
5	(Austria) **J Wiesner**	**7**	**6**
7	(Sweden) **Å Carlsson**	**7**	**6**
WC	(Austria) P Schwarz	6	3
(Netherlands) S Rottier	2	3
4	(Czech Republic) **H Suková**	**6**	**6**
6	(Belgium) **S Appelmans**	**6**	**7**
(Netherlands) M Oremans	3	5
(Slovakia) K Studeníková	2	2
2	(Czech Republic) **J Novotná**	**6**	**6**

Quarterfinals
(Belgium) L Courtois	**6**	3	4
(Russia) **E Makarova**	3	**6**	**6**
3	(France) **J Halard-Decugis**	**7**	**6**
5	(Austria) J Wiesner	5	3
7	(Sweden) Å Carlsson	**6**	4	0
4	(Czech Republic) **H Suková**	3	**6**	**6**
6	(Belgium) **S Appelmans**	**6**	**6**
2	(Czech Republic) J Novotná	4	3

Semifinals
(Russia) E Makarova	6	4
3	(France) **J Halard-Decugis**	**7**	**6**
4	(Czech Republic) H Suková	4	5
6	(Belgium) **S Appelmans**	**6**	**7**

Final
3	(France) J Halard-Decugis	2	4
6	(Belgium) **Sabine Appelmans**	**6**	**6**
