= Monique Kiene =

Dutch tennis player

- Full name: Monique Kiene
- Country (sports): Netherlands
- Born: 5 August 1974 (age 50)
- Plays: Right-handed
- Prize money: $71,935

Singles
- Career record: 60–48
- Career titles: 0 WTA, 1 ITF
- Highest ranking: No. 123 (24 August 1992)

Grand Slam singles results
- Australian Open: 2R (1993)
- French Open: 1R (1993)

Doubles
- Career record: 22–24
- Career titles: 1 WTA
- Highest ranking: No. 61 (8 February 1993)

Grand Slam doubles results
- Australian Open: 2R (1993)
- French Open: 2R (1992)

Monique Kiene (born 5 August 1974) is a former professional tennis player from the Netherlands.

== Biography ==
Kiene, a right-handed player from Purmerend, played on the professional tour in the early 1990s.

She won her first professional tournament in 1991, at the $25k ITF event in Sofia.

In 1992, she partnered with compatriot Miriam Oremans to win her only title on the WTA Tour, in the doubles at the Linz Open. Later in the year she was a semifinalist at the Prague Open, which helped her singles ranking peak at No. 123 in the world.

She played her final year on tour in 1993. At the 1993 Australian Open, she featured in the singles main draw and beat Germany's Maja Živec-Škulj in the first round, before losing her next match to Lindsay Davenport. On 8 February 1993 she reached a career high doubles ranking of 61. She was drawn up against second seed Arantxa Sánchez Vicario in the first round of the 1993 French Open but played a competitive match. After losing the first set, she led the Spaniard 4–0 in the second, before losing the match in a tiebreak.

== WTA career finals ==
=== Doubles: 1 (title) ===
Result	Date	Tournament	Tier	Surface	Partner	Opponents	Score
Win	Feb 1992	Linz Open, Austria	Tier V	Hard	(Netherlands) Miriam Oremans	(Germany) Claudia Porwik (Italy) Raffaella Reggi-Concato	6–4, 6–2

== ITF finals ==
$25,000 tournaments
$10,000 tournaments

=== Singles (1–1) ===
Result	No.	Date	Tournament	Surface	Opponent	Score
Loss	1.	30 June 1991	Covilhã, Portugal	Hard	(France) Barbara Collet	3–6, 1–6
Win	2.	16 September 1991	Sofia, Bulgaria	Clay	(Germany) Meike Babel	7–5, 6–3
