= Katharina Büche =

Austrian tennis player

- ITF name: Katharina Bueche
- Country (sports): Austria
- Born: 19 June 1974 (age 50)
- Prize money: $31,740

Singles
- Career record: 40–63
- Career titles: 0
- Highest ranking: No. 202 (7 March 1994)

Grand Slam singles results
- Australian Open: Q1 (1994, 1995)
- Wimbledon: Q1 (1994)

Doubles
- Career record: 19–33
- Career titles: 0
- Highest ranking: No. 323 (27 July 1992)

Katharina Büche (born 19 June 1974) is an Austrian former professional tennis player.

Büche competed professionally in the 1990s, reaching a top ranking of 202. She featured in the qualifying draws for both the Australian Open and Wimbledon during her career. Her best WTA Tour performances came at the Linz Open, where she twice made the second round, including in 1994 when she had a first round win over Virginia Ruano Pascual.

== ITF finals ==
=== Singles: 1 (0–1) ===
Outcome	Date	Location	Surface	Opponent	Score
Runner-up	29 October 1990	Wels, Austria	Clay (i)	(Czechoslovakia) Monika Kratochvílová	5–7, 3–6
