= 1987 Porsche Tennis Grand Prix =

- Date: 12 – 18 October
- Edition: 10th
- Category: Category 3
- Draw: 32S / 16D
- Prize money: $175,000
- Surface: Carpet / indoor
- Location: Filderstadt, West Germany
- Venue: Filderstadt Tennis Centre

Champions

Singles
- (United States) Martina Navratilova

Doubles
- (United States) Martina Navratilova (United States) Pam Shriver
- Porsche Tennis Grand Prix

The 1987 Porsche Tennis Grand Prix was a women's tennis tournament played on indoor carpet courts at the Filderstadt Tennis Centre in Filderstadt in West Germany and was part of Category 3 tier of the 1987 WTA Tour. It was the 10th edition of the tournament and was held from 12 October to 18 October 1987. First-seeded Martina Navratilova won the singles title, her second consecutive and fourth in total.

== Finals ==
=== Singles ===
(United States) Martina Navratilova defeated (United States) Chris Evert 7–5, 6–1

- It was Navratilova's 3rd singles title of the year and the 128th of her career.

=== Doubles ===
(United States) Martina Navratilova / (United States) Pam Shriver defeated (United States) Zina Garrison / (United States) Lori McNeil 6–1, 6–2

- It was Navratilova's 8th doubles title of the year and the 134th of her career. It was Shriver's 7th doubles title of the year and the 85th of her career.

== See also ==
- Evert–Navratilova rivalry
