= Manuela Maleeva =

Bulgarian tennis player (born 1967)

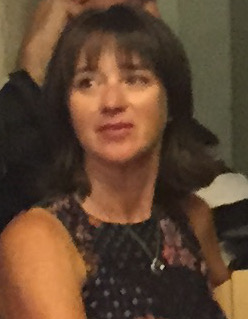
- Native name: Мануела Малеева
- Country (sports): Bulgaria (1982–89); Switzerland (1990–94)
- Residence: La Tour-de-Peilz, Switzerland
- Born: 14 February 1967 (age 59) Sofia, Bulgaria
- Height: 1.73 m (5 ft 8 in)
- Turned pro: May 1982
- Retired: February 1994
- Plays: Right-handed (two-handed backhand)
- Prize money: US$3,244,811

Singles
- Career record: 475–187
- Career titles: 19
- Highest ranking: No. 3 (4 February 1985)

Grand Slam singles results
- Australian Open: QF (1985, 1992, 1994)
- French Open: QF (1985, 1987, 1989, 1990)
- Wimbledon: QF (1984)
- US Open: SF (1992, 1993)

Other tournaments
- Tour Finals: SF (1987)
- Olympic Games: SF (1988)

Doubles
- Career record: 129–131
- Career titles: 4
- Highest ranking: No. 11 (2 August 1993)

Grand Slam doubles results
- Australian Open: 3R (1991, 1992, 1994)
- French Open: QF (1986)
- Wimbledon: 3R (1993)
- US Open: 2R (1985, 1989)

Mixed doubles
- Career titles: 1

Grand Slam mixed doubles results
- French Open: 3R (1984, 1986)
- Wimbledon: 2R (1985)
- US Open: W (1984)

Team competitions
- Fed Cup: Bulgaria; SF (1985, 1987); Switzerland; QF (1991)
- Hopman Cup: Switzerland; W (1992)
Medal record
Women's tennis
Representing Bulgaria
Olympic Games
Bronze medal – third place	1988 Seoul	Women's singles

Manuela Georgieva Maleeva (Bulgarian: Мануела Георгиева Малеева; born 14 February 1967) is a Bulgarian former professional tennis player. She played on the WTA Tour between 1982 and 1994. Through her marriage, Maleeva began representing Switzerland officially from January 1990 until her retirement in February 1994.

One of the most consistent players on tour in the 1980s and early 1990s, Maleeva reached her career-high singles ranking of No. 3 in the world in February 1985 and finished with a year-end top 10 ranking for nine consecutive years (1984 till 1992). A winner of 19 WTA singles titles and four doubles titles, she also reached a total of 14 Grand Slam quarterfinals in her career, including two US Open semifinals in 1992 and 1993, which are her career-best Grand Slam results. She was a semifinalist at the 1987 Virginia Slims Championships.

Maleeva was the bronze medalist in singles at the 1988 Seoul Olympics, winning Bulgaria's first (and thus far, only) Olympic tennis medal. In 1992, she paired up with Jakob Hlasek at the Hopman Cup where they took home Switzerland's first ever title at the event.

== Career ==
Maleeva was born in Sofia, the oldest of the three children of Georgi Maleev and Yuliya Berberyan. Her mother, who came from an Armenian family, was the best Bulgarian tennis player in the 1960s. After she retired from professional tennis in the 1970s, Berberyan started a coaching career. She coached all three of her daughters, Manuela, Katerina, and Magdalena, each of whom became a top six player.

In 1982, Maleeva won the junior French Open, and also made her debut on the senior tour, ending the year ranked in the top 100. After ending the 1983 season in the top 40, she won five tournaments in 1984, and made her debut in the top 10 after defeating Chris Evert in the final of the Italian Open. She also won her only Grand Slam title that year – in mixed doubles at the US Open with American Tom Gullikson.

In 1988, Maleeva-Fragnière won a bronze medal in singles at the Seoul Olympics in Seoul. In 1992 and 1993, Maleeva-Fragnière registered her all-time best achievement in Grand Slam singles competition when she reached the semifinals of the US Open both years (in 1992, after beating youngest sister Magdalena in the quarterfinals).

In 1994, Maleeva-Fragnière retired from professional tennis, after winning the title in Osaka where she beat Iva Majoli in the final. During her 12-year career, she won 19 WTA singles titles, four doubles titles, and one mixed doubles title. She also teamed with Jakob Hlasek to help Switzerland win the Hopman Cup in 1992.

In Fed Cup competition, Maleeva twice helped Bulgaria reach the semifinals (1985 and 1987), and then led Switzerland to the quarterfinals in 1991.

== Personal life ==
Maleeva married Swiss tennis coach François Fragnière in December 1987 and from then on, began competing as Manuela Maleeva-Fragnière. She represented Switzerland from 1990 until her retirement. They have three children, Lora, born in 1995, Iva in 1997, Timo in 1999, but divorced in 2003. She currently resides in La Tour-de-Peilz, about 90 km northeast of Geneva across Lake Geneva.

== Retirement life ==
Maleeva has been active in politics back in her home country, being one of the founding members of Yes, Bulgaria! which was founded in 2017. The party focuses on institutional reforms and an anti-corruption agenda. Prior to that, she also advocated the 2015 Bulgarian electoral code referendum.

Outside politics, Maleeva is also active in her foundation, Fondation Swissclinical, which she co-founded in 2008. The foundation focuses on helping handicapped children and children in need by providing them with good medical care and long-term support.

== Major finals ==
=== Grand Slam tournament finals ===
==== Mixed Doubles: 1 (1 title) ====
Result	Year	Championship	Surface	Partner	Opponents	Score
Win	1984	US Open	Hard	(United States) Tom Gullikson	(Australia) Elizabeth Smylie; (Australia) John Fitzgerald	2–6, 7–5, 6–4

=== Olympics ===
==== Singles: 1 bronze medal ====
Result	Year	Location	Surface	Opponent	Score
Bronze	1988	Seoul, South Korea	Hard	Tied	DNP

Maleeva-Fragnière lost in the semifinals to Gabriela Sabatini 1–6, 2–6. In 1988, there was no bronze medal play-off match; both beaten semifinal players received bronze medals.

== Performance timelines ==
Key
W	F	SF	QF	#R	RR	Q#	DNQ	A	NH

(W) winner; (F) finalist; (SF) semifinalist; (QF) quarterfinalist; (#R) rounds 4, 3, 2, 1; (RR) round-robin stage; (Q#) qualification round; (DNQ) did not qualify; (A) absent; (NH) not held; (SR) strike rate (events won / competed); (W–L) win–loss record.

=== Singles ===
Tournament	1982	1983	1984	1985	1986		1987	1988	1989	1990	1991	1992	1993	1994	SR	W-L	Win%
Grand Slam tournaments
Australian Open	2R	A	A	QF	NH		4R	A	A	A	2R	QF	4R	QF	0 / 7	18–6	75%
French Open	2R	3R	4R	QF	3R		QF	3R	QF	QF	2R	3R	3R	A	0 / 12	30–12	71%
Wimbledon	2R	2R	QF	4R	4R		2R	1R	A	1R	A	3R	2R	A	0 / 10	16–10	62%
US Open	3R	3R	1R	4R	QF		4R	QF	QF	QF	4R	SF	SF	A	0 / 12	39–12	76%
Win–loss	4–4	5–3	7–3	13–4	9–3		10–4	6–3	8–2	8–3	5–3	13–4	11–4	4–1	0 / 41	103–41	72%
Year–end championships
WTA Championships	Did not qualify			1R	1R	QF	SF	QF	QF	QF	1R	1R	1R	DNQ	0 / 10	6–10	38%
National representation	↓ Representing Bulgaria ↓									↓ Representing Switzerland ↓							
Summer Olympics	Not Held		A	Not Held				SF-B	Not Held			QF	Not Held		0 / 2	6–2	75%
Fed Cup	A	1R	QF	SF	QF		SF	A	QF	A	QF	1R	A	A	0 / 10	20–9	69%
Career statistics
Titles	0	0	5	1	0		2	2	2	0	3	1	2	1	Career total: 19		
Finals	0	0	6	5	3		5	4	2	3	4	2	2	1	Career total: 37		
Year-end ranking	60	30	6	7	10		8	6	9	9	10	9	11	N/A	$3,244,811		

=== Doubles ===
Tournament	1982	1983	1984	1985	1986	1987	1988	1989	1990	1991	1992	1993	1994	SR	W-L	Win%
Australian Open	A	A	A	2R	NH	A	A	A	A	3R	3R	2R	3R	0 / 5	8–5	62%
French Open	A	1R	2R	2R	QF	1R	2R	2R	2R	2R	1R	3R	A	0 / 11	11–11	50%
Wimbledon	A	A	1R	1R	2R	1R	1R	A	1R	A	1R	3R	A	0 / 8	3–8	27%
US Open	A	1R	1R	2R	1R	1R	1R	2R	1R	1R	A	1R	A	0 / 10	2–10	17%
Win–loss	0–0	0–2	1–3	3–4	4–3	0–3	1–3	2–2	1–3	3–3	2–3	5–4	2–1	0 / 34	24–34	41%
Career statistics
Titles	0	0	0	1	0	1	0	0	0	1	0	1	0	Career total: 4		
Finals	0	0	0	2	1	2	0	0	0	2	0	4	0	Career total: 11		
Year-end ranking	N/A	N/A	N/A	N/A	45	47	128	72	89	34	261	17	N/A	$3,244,811		

== WTA career finals ==
=== Singles: 37 (19 titles, 18 runner-ups) ===
Legend Grand Slam tournaments (0–0) Tier I (1–1) Tier II (0–0) Tier III (3–4) Tier IV (3–2) Tier V / Virginia Slims (12–11)	Finals by surface Hard (4–2) Clay (6–6) Grass (0–1) Carpet (9–9)

Result	W–L	Date	Tournament	Tier	Surface	Opponent	Score
Loss	0–1	Feb 1984	Houston, United States	Virginia Slims	Carpet (i)	(Czechoslovakia) Hana Mandlíková	4–6, 2–6
Win	1–1	May 1984	Lugano, Switzerland	Virginia Slims	Clay	(Czechoslovakia) Iva Budařová	6–1, 6–1
Win	2–1	May 1984	Perugia, Italy	Virginia Slims	Clay	(United States) Chris Evert	6–3, 6–3
Win	3–1	Aug 1984	Indianapolis, United States	Virginia Slims	Clay	(United States) Lisa Bonder	6–4, 6–3
Win	4–1	Nov 1984	Tokyo, Japan	Virginia Slims	Carpet (i)	(Czechoslovakia) Hana Mandlíková	6–1, 1–6, 6–4
Win	5–1	Dec 1984	Tokyo, Japan	Virginia Slims	Carpet (i)	(West Germany) Claudia Kohde-Kilsch	3–6, 6–4, 6–4
Loss	5–2	Jan 1985	Washington, United States	Virginia Slims	Carpet (i)	(United States) Martina Navratilova	3–6, 2–6
Loss	5–3	May 1985	Lugano, Switzerland	Virginia Slims	Clay	(United States) Bonnie Gadusek	2–6, 2–6
Loss	5–4	Oct 1985	Brighton, Great Britain	Virginia Slims	Carpet (i)	(United States) Chris Evert	5–7, 3–6
Loss	5–5	Nov 1985	Tokyo, Japan	Virginia Slims	Carpet (i)	(United States) Chris Evert	5–7, 0–6
Win	6–5	Dec 1985	Tokyo, Japan	Virginia Slims	Carpet (i)	(United States) Bonnie Gadusek	7–6^{(7–2)}, 3–6, 7–5
Loss	6–6	May 1986	Lugano, Switzerland	Virginia Slims	Clay	(Italy) Raffaella Reggi	7–5, 3–6, 6–7^{(6–8)}
Loss	6–7	Jun 1986	Birmingham, Great Britain	Virginia Slims	Grass	(United States) Pam Shriver	2–6, 6–7^{(0–7)}
Loss	6–8	Sep 1986	Tokyo, Japan	Virginia Slims	Carpet (i)	(West Germany) Steffi Graf	4–6, 2–6
Win	7–8	Apr 1987	Wild Dunes, United States	Virginia Slims	Clay	(Italy) Raffaella Reggi	5–7, 6–2, 6–3
Loss	7–9	Apr 1987	Hilton Head, United States	Virginia Slims	Clay	(West Germany) Steffi Graf	2–6, 6–4, 3–6
Loss	7–10	May 1987	Geneva, Switzerland	Virginia Slims	Clay	(United States) Chris Evert	3–6, 6–4, 2–6
Win	8–10	Aug 1987	Mahwah, United States	Virginia Slims	Hard	(West Germany) Sylvia Hanika	1–6, 6–4, 6–1
Loss	8–11	Sep 1987	Tokyo, Japan	Virginia Slims	Carpet (i)	(Argentina) Gabriela Sabatini	4–6, 6–7^{(6–8)}
Win	9–11	Mar 1988	Wichita, United States	Tier V	Hard (i)	(West Germany) Sylvia Hanika	7–6^{(7–5)}, 7–5
Win	10–11	Sep 1988	Phoenix, United States	Tier V	Hard	(South Africa) Dinky Van Rensburg	6–3, 4–6, 6–2
Loss	10–12	Oct 1988	Zurich, Switzerland	Tier IV	Carpet (i)	(United States) Pam Shriver	3–6, 4–6
Loss	10–13	Oct 1988	Brighton, Great Britain	Tier III	Carpet (i)	(West Germany) Steffi Graf	2–6, 0–6
Win	11–13	Mar 1989	Indian Wells, United States	Tier III	Hard	(Australia) Jenny Byrne	6–4, 6–1
Win	12–13	May 1989	Geneva, Switzerland	Tier V	Clay	(Spain) Conchita Martínez	6–4, 6–0
Loss	12–14	Feb 1990	Chicago, United States	Tier I	Carpet (i)	(United States) Martina Navratilova	3–6, 2–6
Loss	12–15	Apr 1990	San Antonio, United States	Tier III	Hard	(Socialist Federal Republic of Yugoslavia) Monica Seles	4–6, 3–6
Loss	12–16	Aug 1990	San Diego, United States	Tier III	Hard	(West Germany) Steffi Graf	3–6, 2–6
Win	13–16	Feb 1991	Linz, Austria	Tier V	Carpet (i)	(Czechoslovakia) Petra Langrová	6–4, 7–6^{(7–1)}
Loss	13–17	Apr 1991	Barcelona, Spain	Tier III	Clay	(Spain) Conchita Martínez	4–6, 1–6
Win	14–17	May 1991	Geneva, Switzerland	Tier IV	Clay	(Canada) Helen Kelesi	6–3, 3–6, 6–3
Win	15–17	Sep 1991	Bayonne, France	Tier IV	Carpet (i)	(Soviet Union) Leila Meskhi	4–6, 6–3, 6–4
Loss	15–18	Jul 1992	Kitzbühel, Austria	Tier IV	Clay	(Spain) Conchita Martínez	0–6, 6–3, 2–6
Win	16–18	Oct 1992	Bayonne, France	Tier IV	Carpet (i)	(France) Nathalie Tauziat	6–7^{(4–7)}, 6–2, 6–3
Win	17–18	Feb 1993	Linz, Austria	Tier III	Carpet (i)	(Spain) Conchita Martínez	6–2, 1–0 ret.
Win	18–18	Oct 1993	Zurich, Switzerland	Tier I	Carpet (i)	(United States) Martina Navratilova	6–3, 7–6^{(7–1)}
Win	19–18	Feb 1994	Osaka, Japan	Tier III	Carpet (i)	(Croatia) Iva Majoli	6–1, 4–6, 7–5

=== Doubles: 11 (4 titles, 7 runner–ups) ===
Legend Grand Slam tournaments (0–0) Tier I (0–0) Tier II (1–2) Tier III (0–1) Tier IV (0–1) Tier V / Virginia Slims (3–3)	Finals by surface Hard (0–1) Clay (3–3) Grass (0–0) Carpet (1–3)

Result	W–L	Date	Tournament	Tier	Surface	Partner	Opponents	Score
Loss	0–1	May 1985	Houston, United States	Virginia Slims	Clay	(Czechoslovakia) Helena Suková	(United States) Elise Burgin; (United States) Martina Navratilova	1–6, 6–3, 3–6
Win	1–1	Jul 1985	Indianapolis, United States	Virginia Slims	Clay	(Bulgaria) Katerina Maleeva	(United States) Penny Barg (United States) Paula Smith	3–6, 6–3, 6–4
Loss	1–2	Sep 1986	Tokyo, Japan	Virginia Slims	Carpet (i)	(Bulgaria) Katerina Maleeva	(West Germany) Bettina Bunge (West Germany) Steffi Graf	1–6, 7–6^{(7–4)}, 2–6
Win	2–2	Jul 1987	Knokke, Belgium	Virginia Slims	Clay	(West Germany) Bettina Bunge	(United States) Kathleen Horvath; (Netherlands) Marcella Mesker	4–6, 6–4, 6–4
Loss	2–3	Sep 1987	Tokyo, Japan	Virginia Slims	Carpet (i)	(Bulgaria) Katerina Maleeva	(United States) Anne White (United States) Robin White	1–6, 2–6
Win	3–3	Feb 1991	Linz, Austria	Tier V	Carpet (i)	(Italy) Raffaella Reggi	(Czechoslovakia) Petra Langrová; (Czechoslovakia) Radka Zrubáková	6–4, 1–6, 6–3
Loss	3–4	May 1991	Geneva, Switzerland	Tier IV	Clay	(Switzerland) Cathy Caverzasio	(Australia) Nicole Bradtke; (Australia) Elizabeth Smylie	1–6, 2–6
Loss	3–5	Feb 1993	Osaka, Japan	Tier III	Carpet (i)	(Bulgaria) Magdalena Maleeva	(Czech Republic) Jana Novotná (Latvia) Larisa Neiland	1–6, 3–6
Win	4–5	Apr 1993	Amelia Island, United States	Tier II	Clay	(Georgia (country)) Leila Meskhi	(South Africa) Amanda Coetzer; (Argentina) Inés Gorrochategui	3–6, 6–3, 6–4
Loss	4–6	Apr 1993	Barcelona, Spain	Tier II	Clay	(Bulgaria) Magdalena Maleeva	(Spain) Conchita Martínez (Spain) Arantxa Sánchez Vicario	6–4, 1–6, 0–6
Loss	4–7	Aug 1993	Stratton Mountain, United States	Tier II	Hard	(Argentina) Mercedes Paz	(Australia) Elizabeth Smylie (Czech Republic) Helena Suková	1–6, 2–6

== ITF Circuit finals ==
=== Singles: 4 (2 titles, 2 runner–ups) ===
Legend $100,000 tournaments $75,000 tournaments $50,000 tournaments $25,000 tournaments $10,000 tournaments	Finals by surface Hard (0–0) Clay (2–2) Grass (0–0) Carpet (0–0)

Result	W–L	Date	Tournament	Tier	Surface	Opponent	Score
Loss	0–1	Mar 1982	ITF Caserta, Italy	10,000	Clay	(Czechoslovakia) Hana Fukárková	4–6, 1–6
Win	1–1	Apr 1982	ITF Lecce, Italy	10,000	Clay	(Australia) Elizabeth Smylie	6–4, 6–4
Win	2–1	Apr 1982	ITF Catania, Italy	10,000	Clay	(West Germany) Gabriela Dinu	6–3, 6–1
Loss	2–2	Jul 1982	ITF Båstad, Sweden	10,000	Clay	(Sweden) Lena Sandin	7–6, 5–7, 3–6

=== Doubles: 3 (3 titles) ===
Legend $100,000 tournaments $75,000 tournaments $50,000 tournaments $25,000 tournaments $10,000 tournaments	Finals by surface Hard (0–0) Clay (3–0) Grass (0–0) Carpet (0–0)

Result	W–L	Date	Tournament	Tier	Surface	Partner	Opponents	Score
Win	1–0	Apr 1982	ITF Taranto, Italy	10,000	Clay	(Socialist Federal Republic of Yugoslavia) Renata Šašak	(Sweden) Catrin Jexell (Argentina) Isabelle Villaverde	7–5, 3–6, 6–2
Win	2–0	Apr 1982	ITF Lecce, Italy	10,000	Clay	(Socialist Federal Republic of Yugoslavia) Renata Šašak	(Sweden) Lena Sandin (Sweden) Elisabeth Ekblom	6–2, 2–6, 8–6
Win	3–0	Sep 1985	ITF Sofia, Bulgaria	25,000	Clay	(Bulgaria) Katerina Maleeva	(Czechoslovakia) Yvona Brzáková (Czechoslovakia) Hana Fukárková	6–1, 6–2

== Junior Grand Slam tournament finals ==
=== Singles: 1 (1 title) ===
Result	Year	Championship	Surface	Opponent	Score
Win	1982	French Open	Clay	(United States) Penny Barg	7–5, 6–2

== Fed Cup ==
Manuela Maleeva debuted for the Bulgaria Fed Cup team in 1983. She has a 21–5 singles record and a 7–10 doubles record (28–15 overall).

=== Singles (21–5) ===
Edition	Round	Date	Against	Surface	Opponent	W/L	Result
1983 World Group I	R1	17 July 1983	Switzerland	Clay	(Switzerland) Christiane Jolissaint	L	4–6, 6–4, 4–6
1983 World Group I	PO	19 July 1983	Zimbabwe	Clay	(Zimbabwe) Angela Longo	W	6–1, 6–0
1983 World Group I	PO	21 July 1983	Soviet Union	Clay	(Soviet Union) Olga Zaitseva	W	6–0, 6–3
1984 World Group I	R1	15 July 1984	Great Britain	Clay	(United Kingdom) Jo Durie	W	6–4, 4–6, 6–4
1984 World Group I	R2	16 July 1984	Soviet Union	Clay	(Soviet Union) Natasha Reva	W	6–2, 6–0
1984 World Group I	QF	18 July 1984	Yugoslavia	Clay	(Socialist Federal Republic of Yugoslavia) Mima Jaušovec	W	3–6, 6–3, 6–1
1985 World Group I	R1	6 October 1985	Soviet Union	Hard	(Soviet Union) Larisa Savchenko	W	6–7^{(3–7)}, 6–4, 6–1
1985 World Group I	R2	8 October 1985	Yugoslavia	Hard	(Socialist Federal Republic of Yugoslavia) Sabrina Goleš	W	6–1, 6–3
1985 World Group I	QF	10 October 1985	Great Britain	Hard	(United Kingdom) Annabel Croft	W	6–2, 6–2
1985 World Group I	SF	12 October 1985	Czechoslovakia	Hard	(Czechoslovakia) Hana Mandlíková	L	6–3, 2–6, 1–6
1986 World Group I	R1	20 July 1986	Soviet Union	Clay	(Soviet Union) Larisa Savchenko	W	6–2, 6–1
1986 World Group I	R2	21 July 1986	France	Clay	(France) Catherine Tanvier	W	6–0, 6–1
1986 World Group I	QF	23 July 1986	West Germany	Clay	(West Germany) Claudia Kohde-Kilsch	W	6–4, 6–2
1987 World Group I	R1	26 July 1987	Greece	Hard	(Greece) Angeliki Kanellopoulou	W	6–0, 6–0
1987 World Group I	R2	27 July 1987	Indonesia	Hard	(Indonesia) Yayuk Basuki	W	6–4, 6–0
1987 World Group I	QF	29 July 1987	Australia	Hard	(Australia) Elizabeth Smylie	W	6–4, 6–4
1987 World Group I	SF	31 July 1987	United States	Hard	(United States) Chris Evert	L	2–6, 6–2, 4–6
1989 World Group I	R1	1 October 1989	South Korea	Hard	(South Korea) Kim Il-soon	W	6–1, 6–0
1989 World Group I	R2	3 October 1989	Argentina	Hard	(Argentina) Mercedes Paz	W	4–6, 6–1, 6–3
1989 World Group I	QF	5 October 1989	Australia	Hard	(Australia) Anne Minter	L	3–6, 6–2, 4–6
↓ Representing Switzerland ↓
1991 World Group I	R1	23 July 1991	Argentina	Hard	(Argentina) Mercedes Paz	W	6–0, 7–6^{(7–5)}
1991 World Group I	R2	24 July 1991	China	Hard	(China) Li Fang	W	6–7^{(5–7)}, 7–5, 6–2
1991 World Group I	QF	25 July 1991	Czechoslovakia	Hard	(Czechoslovakia) Jana Novotná	L	4–6, 4–6
1992 World Group I	R1	14 July 1992	Sweden	Clay	(Sweden) Catarina Lindqvist	W	6–0, 6–2
1992 World Group I	PO	16 July 1992	Israel	Clay	(Israel) Anna Smashnova	W	6–1, 6–0
1992 World Group I	PO	17 July 1992	Paraguay	Clay	(Paraguay) Rossana de los Ríos	W	6–2, 6–2

=== Doubles (7–10) ===
Edition	Round	Date	Partner	Against	Surface	Opponents	W/L	Result
1983 World Group I	PO	19 July 1983	(Bulgaria) Marina Kondova	Zimbabwe	Clay	(Zimbabwe) Angela Longo (Zimbabwe) Lindsay Standen	W	6–4, 6–2
1983 World Group I	PO	21 July 1983	(Bulgaria) Adriana Velcheva	Soviet Union	Clay	(Soviet Union) Svetlana Cherneva; (Soviet Union) Larisa Savchenko	L	4–6, 3–6
1984 World Group I	R1	15 July 1984	(Bulgaria) Katerina Maleeva	Great Britain	Clay	(United Kingdom) Amanda Brown (United Kingdom) Anne Hobbs	W	7–6, 7–5
1984 World Group I	R2	16 July 1984	(Bulgaria) Katerina Maleeva	Soviet Union	Clay	(Soviet Union) Elena Eliseenko; (Soviet Union) Larisa Savchenko	L	7–5, 5–7, 1–6
1984 World Group I	QF	18 July 1984	(Bulgaria) Katerina Maleeva	Yugoslavia	Clay	(Socialist Federal Republic of Yugoslavia) Sabrina Goleš; (Socialist Federal Republic of Yugoslavia) Mima Jaušovec	L	3–6, 1–6
1985 World Group I	R1	6 October 1985	(Bulgaria) Katerina Maleeva	Soviet Union	Hard	(Soviet Union) Natalia Egorova (Soviet Union) Svetlana Cherneva	W	6–3, 7–5
1985 World Group I	R2	8 October 1985	(Bulgaria) Katerina Maleeva	Yugoslavia	Hard	(Socialist Federal Republic of Yugoslavia) Sabrina Goleš (Socialist Federal Republic of Yugoslavia) Aila Winkler	W	6–4, 7–6^{(9–7)}
1985 World Group I	QF	10 October 1985	(Bulgaria) Katerina Maleeva	Great Britain	Hard	(United Kingdom) Jo Durie; (United Kingdom) Anne Hobbs	L	4–5, Ret.
1985 World Group I	SF	12 October 1985	(Bulgaria) Katerina Maleeva	Czechoslovakia	Hard	(Czechoslovakia) Hana Mandlíková; (Czechoslovakia) Helena Suková	L	3–6, 6–7^{(4–7)}
1986 World Group I	R1	20 July 1986	(Bulgaria) Katerina Maleeva	Soviet Union	Clay	(Soviet Union) Svetlana Cherneva; (Soviet Union) Larisa Savchenko	L	6–1, 4–6, 1–6
1986 World Group I	QF	23 July 1986	(Bulgaria) Katerina Maleeva	West Germany	Clay	(West Germany) Bettina Bunge; (West Germany) Claudia Kohde-Kilsch	L	4–6, 2–6
1989 World Group I	R1	1 October 1989	(Bulgaria) Katerina Maleeva	South Korea	Hard	(South Korea) Kim Il-soon; (South Korea) Lee Jeong-myung	W	7–5, 6–0
1989 World Group I	R2	3 October 1989	(Bulgaria) Katerina Maleeva	Argentina	Hard	(Argentina) Florencia Labat; (Argentina) Mercedes Paz	W	6–1, 3–6, 6–1
1989 World Group I	QF	5 October 1989	(Bulgaria) Katerina Maleeva	Australia	Hard	(Australia) Elizabeth Smylie; (Australia) Janine Tremelling	L	7–5, 4–6, 0–6
↓ Representing Switzerland ↓
1991 World Group I	R2	24 July 1991	(Switzerland) Cathy Caverzasio	China	Hard	(China) Li Fang (China) Yi Jing-Qian	L	1–3, Ret.
1991 World Group I	QF	25 July 1991	(Switzerland) Cathy Caverzasio	Czechoslovakia	Hard	(Czechoslovakia) Jana Novotná; (Czechoslovakia) Regina Rajchrtová	W	6–4, 2–1, Ret.
1992 World Group I	R1	14 July 1992	(Switzerland) Michèle Strebel	Sweden	Clay	(Sweden) Maria Lindström; (Sweden) Maria Strandlund	L	4–6, 7–5, 4–6

== Record against other top players ==
Maleeva's win–loss record against certain players who have been ranked world No. 10 or higher is as follows:

Players who have been ranked world No. 1 are in boldface.

- (Bulgaria) Katerina Maleeva 8–1
- (Sweden) Catarina Lindqvist 7–2
- (United States) Kathy Jordan 6–0
- (United States) Kathy Rinaldi 6–1
- (United States) Lori McNeil 6–2
- (Germany) Claudia Kohde-Kilsch 5–2
- (Czechoslovakia) / (Czech Republic) Helena Suková 5–2
- (Spain) Conchita Martínez 5–4
- (Germany) Sylvia Hanika 4–0
- (Soviet Union) / (Belarus) Natasha Zvereva 4–0
- (United Kingdom) Jo Durie 4–1
- (Netherlands) Brenda Schultz-McCarthy 4–1
- (United States) Zina Garrison 4–2
- (France) Nathalie Tauziat 4–6
- (Czechoslovakia) / (Slovakia) Karina Habšudová 3–0
- (Socialist Federal Republic of Yugoslavia) Mima Jaušovec 3–0
- (United States) Lisa Bonder 3–1
- (United States) Barbara Potter 3–2
- (Hungary) Andrea Temesvári 3–2
- (United States) Bonnie Gadusek 3–4
- (Czechoslovakia) / (Australia) Hana Mandlíková 3–4
- (Czechoslovakia) / (United States) **Martina Navratilova** 3–11
- (Bulgaria) Magdalena Maleeva 2–0
- (Belgium) Dominique Monami 2–0
- (Romania) Virginia Ruzici 2–0
- (Canada) Carling Bassett-Seguso 2–1
- (United States) Kathleen Horvath 2–1
- (Australia) Dianne Fromholtz 2–2
- (Germany) Bettina Bunge 2–3
- (United States) Mary Joe Fernández 2–5
- (Argentina) Gabriela Sabatini 2–7
- (United States) Pam Shriver 2–7
- (United States) **Chris Evert** 2–17
- (United Kingdom) Sue Barker 1–0
- (Japan) Kimiko Date-Krumm 1–0
- (France) Julie Halard-Decugis 1–0
- (Croatia) Iva Majoli 1–0
- (France) Mary Pierce 1–0
- (United States) Stephanie Rehe 1–0
- (Austria) Barbara Paulus 1–1
- (Czechoslovakia) / (Czech Republic) Jana Novotná 1–2
- (Australia) Wendy Turnbull 1–2
- (Spain) **Arantxa Sánchez Vicario** 1–5
- (United States) **Tracy Austin** 0–1
- (United States) **Jennifer Capriati** 0–1
- (Australia) **Evonne Goolagong Cawley** 0–1
- (Germany) Anke Huber 0–2
- (Socialist Federal Republic of Yugoslavia) / (Federal Republic of Yugoslavia) / (United States) **Monica Seles** 0–9
- (Germany) **Steffi Graf** 0–17

== See also ==
- Katerina Maleeva
- Magdalena Maleeva
- List of female tennis players

Awards
Preceded by (Switzerland) Conny Kissling	Swiss Sportswoman of the Year; 1993	Succeeded by (Switzerland) Vreni Schneider
