= TipsArena Linz =

Indoor arena in Linz, Austria

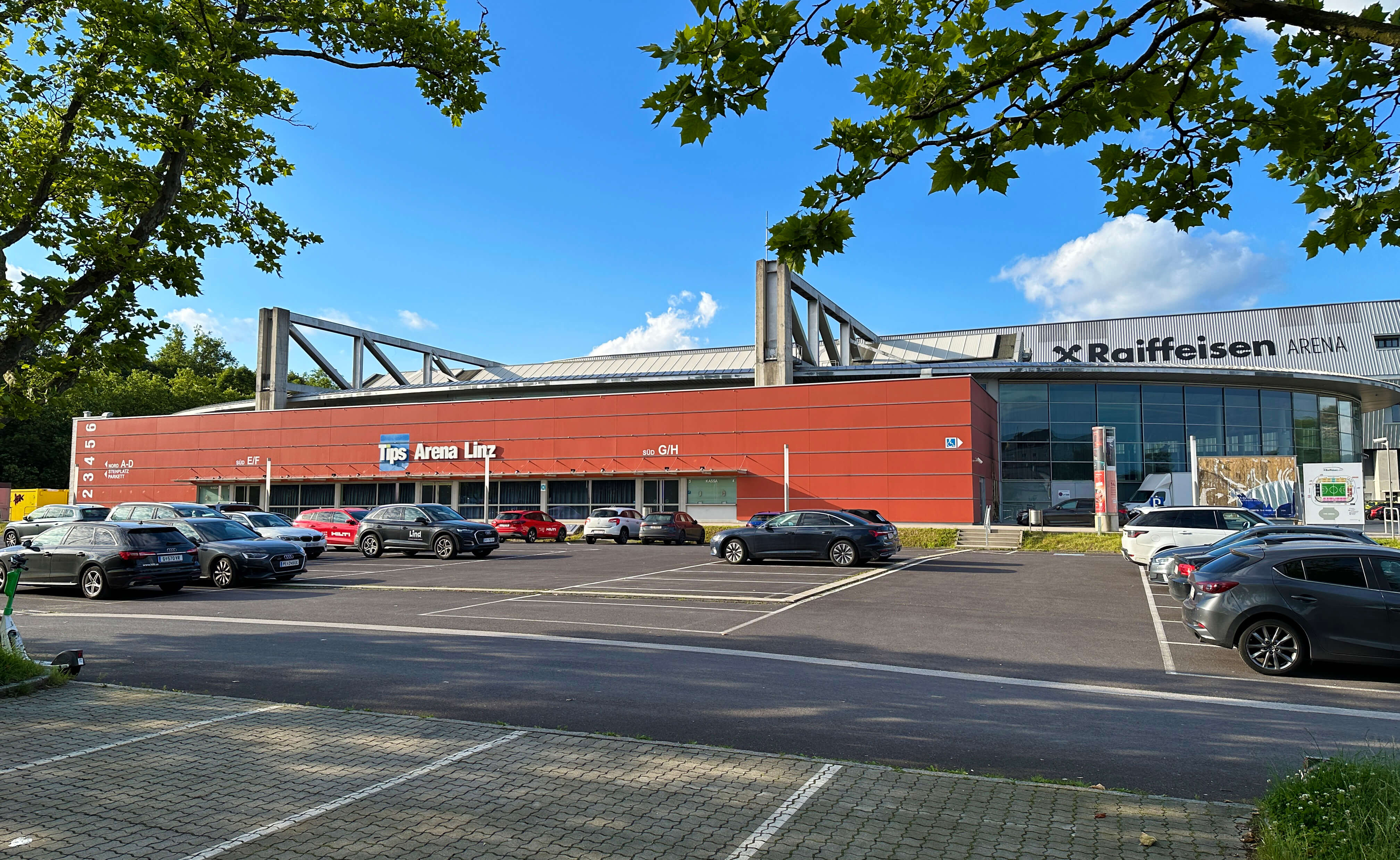
- Interactive map of TipsArena Linz
- Former names: Linzer Sporthalle (1974–2003); Intersport Arena (2003–2010)
- Location: Linz, Austria
- Coordinates: 48.292622°N 14.275789°E
- Capacity: 8,755

Construction
- Groundbreaking: 1972
- Opened: March 2003

TipsArena Linz (formerly Linzer Sporthalle and Intersport Arena) is an multipurpose indoor arena, located in Linz, Austria. It is used for concerts, events, various shows, and for all kinds of sport events like tennis, football and athletics. The arena can host a maximum of 8,755 people. It opened in March 2003.

== See also ==
- List of indoor arenas in Austria
