= Sandra Reichel =

Austrian tennis player and sports administrator (born 1971)

- Country (sports): Austria
- Born: 24 June 1971 (age 54)
- Prize money: $17,644

Singles
- Career record: 23–63
- Highest ranking: No. 449 (1 Feb 1993)

Doubles
- Career record: 23–40
- Highest ranking: No. 232 (8 Mar 1993)

Sandra Reichel (born 24 June 1971) is an Austrian sports administrator and former professional tennis player.

Reichel competed on the professional tour in the late 1980s and early 1990s. Her WTA Tour appearances include three main draw entries in her native Linz. She had career high rankings of 449 in singles and 232 for doubles.

A sports manager by profession, Reichel has served as tournament director of several tournaments on both the men's and women's circuits, most recently the Hamburg European Open and Upper Austria Ladies Linz.

== ITF finals ==
=== Doubles: 3 (0–3) ===
Outcome	No.	Date	Tournament	Surface	Partner	Opponents	Score
Runner-up	1.	27 August 1990	Palermo, Italy	Clay	(France) Emmanuelle Derly	(Netherlands) Ingelise Driehuis (Australia) Louise Pleming	1–6, 1–6
Runner-up	2.	3 December 1990	Belo Horizonte, Brazil	Clay	(Japan) Shiho Okada	(United States) Laura Glitz (Brazil) Sofia Kelbert	6–4, 5–7, 1–6
Runner-up	3.	25 April 1994	Neudörfl, Austria	Clay	(Austria) Désirée Leupold	(Czech Republic) Monika Kratochvílová (Czech Republic) Zdeňka Málková	0–6, 6–4, 1–6
