= Raffaella Reggi =

Italian tennis player

Raffaella Reggi-Concato
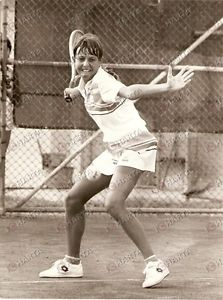
- Reggi at the 1981 Italian Championships
- Country (sports): Italy
- Residence: Faenza
- Born: 27 November 1965 (age 60) Faenza
- Height: 1.70 m (5 ft 7 in)
- Turned pro: 1983
- Plays: Right-handed (two-handed backhand)
- Prize money: $875,853

Singles
- Career record: 296–189
- Career titles: 5
- Highest ranking: No. 13 (25 April 1988)

Grand Slam singles results
- Australian Open: 4R (1989, 1990)
- French Open: QF (1987)
- Wimbledon: 4R (1986, 1987)
- US Open: 4R (1986)

Doubles
- Career record: 126–122
- Career titles: 4
- Highest ranking: No. 25 (24 June 1991)

Grand Slam mixed doubles results
- Australian Open: QF (1990)
- French Open: SF (1986)
- Wimbledon: QF (1986)
- US Open: W (1986)

Raffaella Reggi (Italian pronunciation: [raffaˈɛlla ˈreddʒi]; born 27 November 1965) is an Italian TV pundit and former professional tennis player.

== Career ==
Reggis started playing tennis at age 5 and attended Nick Bollettieri's school in Florida. As a junior, Reggi won the Orange Bowl 16 and under in 1981. She was a member of the Continental Players Cup Team in 1982.

Reggi won the mixed doubles title at the US Open in 1986, partnering Sergio Casal. She was a singles quarter-finalist at the French Open in 1987, and reached a career-high singles ranking of world No. 13 in 1988. One of the highlights of her career was winning the Italian Open in 1985, when she became the first Italian woman to win that tournament since Annelies Ullstein-Bossi claimed the title in 1950. Ullstein-Bossi, Reggi, the 2014 finalist Sara Errani and Jasmine Paolini in 2025 are the only Italian women to reach the singles final of Italy's top tennis tournament since World War II.

Reggi finished her career with five singles titles and four doubles titles. She was a member of the Italian Fed Cup team from 1982 through 1991 and the Italian Olympic Team in 1988 and 1992. She had career victories over Steffi Graf, Chris Evert, Evonne Goolagong, Jana Novotná, Hana Mandlíková, Manuela Maleeva, Nathalie Tauziat, Helena Suková, Claudia Kohde-Kilsch, Zina Garrison, and Jo Durie.

== Grand Slam finals ==
=== Mixed Doubles: 1 (1 title) ===
Result	Year	Championship	Surface	Partner	Opponents	Score
Win	1986	US Open	Hard	(Spain) Sergio Casal	(United States) Martina Navratilova (United States) Peter Fleming	6–4, 6–4

== WTA Tour finals ==
=== Singles: 11 (5–6) ===
Legend Grand Slam tournaments (0–0) WTA Tour Championships (0–0) Tier I (0–0) Tier II (0–1) Tier III (0–0) Tier IV (0–0) Tier V (1–3) Virginia Slims (4–2)	Finals by surface Hard (2–1) Grass (0–1) Clay (3–3) Carpet (0–1)

Result	W/L	Date	Tournament	Surface	Opponent	Score
Win	1–0	Apr 1985	Taranto, Italy	Clay	(United States) Vicki Nelson-Dunbar	6–4, 6–4
Loss	1–1	May 1985	Barcelona, Spain	Clay	(Italy) Sandra Cecchini	3–6, 4–6
Win	2–1	May 1986	Lugano, Switzerland	Clay	(Bulgaria) Manuela Maleeva	5–7, 6–3, 7–6^{(8–6)}
Win	3–1	Nov 1986	San Juan, U.S.	Hard	(Socialist Federal Republic of Yugoslavia) Sabrina Goleš	7–6^{(7–4)}, 4–6, 6–3
Loss	3–2	Mar 1987	Isle of Palms, U.S.	Clay	(Bulgaria) Manuela Maleeva	7–5, 2–6, 3–6
Win	4–2	Aug 1987	San Diego, U.S.	Hard	(Australia) Anne Minter	6–0, 6–4
Loss	4–3	Jul 1988	Brussels, Belgium	Clay	(Spain) Arantxa Sánchez Vicario	0–6, 5–7
Loss	4–4	Jun 1989	Eastbourne, UK	Grass	(United States) Martina Navratilova	6–7^{(2–7)}, 2–6
Loss	4–5	Oct 1989	Indianapolis, U.S.	Hard (I)	(Bulgaria) Katerina Maleeva	4–6, 4–6
Win	5–5	Apr 1990	Taranto, Italy	Clay	(France) Alexia Dechaume	3–6, 6–0, 6–2
Loss	5–6	Feb 1991	Oslo, Norway	Carpet (I)	(Sweden) Catarina Lindqvist	3–6, 0–6

=== Doubles: 14 (4–10) ===
Legend Grand Slam tournaments (0–0) WTA Tour Championships (0–0) Tier I (0–1) Tier II (0–1) Tier III (0–2) Tier IV (1–0) Tier V (2–6) Virginia Slims (1–0)	Finals by surface Hard (1–4) Grass (0–0) Clay (2–1) Carpet (1–5)

Result	W/L	Date	Tournament	Surface	Partner	Opponents	Score
Win	1–0	Apr 1985	Taranto, Italy	Clay	(Italy) Sandra Cecchini	(Italy) Patrizia Murgo (Italy) Barbara Romanò	1–6, 6–4, 6–3
Win	2–0	Mar 1988	Tampa, US	Clay	(United States) Terry Phelps	(United States) Cammy MacGregor (United States) Cynthia MacGregor	6–2, 6–4
Loss	2–1	Jul 1988	Brussels, Belgium	Clay	(Bulgaria) Katerina Maleeva	(Argentina) Mercedes Paz (Denmark) Tine Scheuer-Larsen	6–7^{(3–7)}, 1–6
Loss	2–2	Oct 1988	Filderstadt, Germany	Carpet (I)	(South Africa) Elna Reinach	(Poland) Iwona Kuczyńska (United States) Martina Navratilova	1–6, 1–6
Loss	2–3	Aug 1989	Albuquerque, US	Hard	(Spain) Arantxa Sánchez Vicario	(Australia) Nicole Provis (South Africa) Elna Reinach	6–4, 4–6, 2–6
Loss	2–4	Oct 1989	Filderstadt, Germany	Carpet (I)	(South Africa) Elna Reinach	(United States) Gigi Fernández (United States) Robin White	4–6, 6–7^{(2–7)}
Loss	2–5	Oct 1989	Bayonne, France	Hard (I)	(South Africa) Elna Reinach	(Netherlands) Manon Bollegraf (France) Catherine Tanvier	6–7^{(3–7)}, 5–7
Loss	2–6	Jul 1990	Montreal, Canada	Hard	(Canada) Helen Kelesi	(United States) Betsy Nagelsen (Argentina) Gabriela Sabatini	6–3, 2–6, 2–6
Loss	2–7	Feb 1991	Oslo, Norway	Carpet (I)	(Belgium) Sabine Appelmans	(West Germany) Claudia Kohde-Kilsch (West Germany) Silke Meier	6–3, 3–6, 4–6
Win	3–7	Feb 1991	Linz, Austria	Carpet (I)	(Switzerland) Manuela Maleeva-Fragniere	(Czechoslovakia) Petra Langrová (Czechoslovakia) Radka Zrubáková	6–4, 1–6, 6–3
Loss	3–8	Sep 1991	Milan, Italy	Carpet (I)	(Belgium) Sabine Appelmans	(United States) Sandy Collins (United States) Lori McNeil	6–7^{(0–7)}, 3–6
Win	4–8	Jan 1992	Auckland, New Zealand	Hard	(South Africa) Rosalyn Fairbank-Nideffer	(Canada) Jill Hetherington (United States) Kathy Rinaldi	1–6, 6–1, 7–5
Loss	4–9	Feb 1992	Linz, Austria	Hard (I)	(Germany) Claudia Porwik	(Netherlands) Monique Kiene (Netherlands) Miriam Oremans	4–6, 2–6
Loss	4–10	Feb 1992	Cesena, Italy	Carpet (I)	(Belgium) Sabine Appelmans	(France) Catherine Suire (France) Catherine Tanvier	w/o

== Grand Slam singles performance timeline ==
Key
W	F	SF	QF	#R	RR	Q#	DNQ	A	NH

(W) winner; (F) finalist; (SF) semifinalist; (QF) quarterfinalist; (#R) rounds 4, 3, 2, 1; (RR) round-robin stage; (Q#) qualification round; (DNQ) did not qualify; (A) absent; (NH) not held; (SR) strike rate (events won / competed); (W–L) win–loss record.

Tournament	1982	1983	1984	1985	1986	1987	1988	1989	1990	1991	1992	Career SR
Australian Open	A	1R	A	A	NH	A	A	4R	4R	1R	A	0 / 4
French Open	Q2	1R	3R	4R	2R	QF	2R	2R	2R	A	1R	0 / 9
Wimbledon	A	2R	1R	A	4R	4R	A	3R	1R	A	A	0 / 6
US Open	A	2R	2R	2R	4R	3R	2R	1R	3R	A	A	0 / 8
SR	0 / 0	0 / 4	0 / 3	0 / 2	0 / 3	0 / 3	0 / 2	0 / 4	0 / 4	0 / 1	0 / 1	0 / 27
Year End Ranking	127	45	62	42	22	17	23	21	23	75	56	
