= Petra Langrová =

Czech tennis player

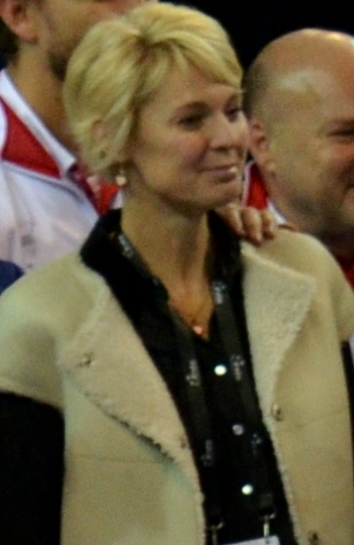
- Langrová in 2016
- Country (sports): Czechoslovakia; Czech Republic
- Born: 27 June 1970 (age 54); Prostějov, Czechoslovakia
- Turned pro: 1986
- Retired: 1998
- Prize money: $633,808

Singles
- Career record: 186–196
- Career titles: 1 WTA, 3 ITF
- Highest ranking: No. 53 (26 May 1997)

Grand Slam singles results
- Australian Open: 2R (1989, 1993)
- French Open: 3R (1996)
- Wimbledon: 2R (1994)
- US Open: 3R (1996)

Doubles
- Career record: 178–165
- Career titles: 5 WTA, 8 ITF
- Highest ranking: No. 35 (19 April 1993)

Petra Píchalová Langrová (born 27 June 1970) is a retired tennis player from Czechoslovakia and later Czech Republic.

Langrová gained professional status in 1986. She won one singles title and five double titles in her career on the WTA Tour. She reached career-high rankings of 53 in singles (in May 1997) and 35 in doubles (in April 1993), and retired from the tour in 1998.

== WTA Tour finals ==
=== Singles: 2 (1 title, 1 runner-up) ===
Legend
Grand Slam tournaments (0–0)
Tier I (0–0)
Tier II (0–0)
Tier III (0–0)
Tier IV (0–1)
Tier V (1–0)

Result	W/L	Date	Tournament	Surface	Opponent	Score
Win	1–0	Sep 1988	Paris, France	Clay	(Belgium) Sandra Wasserman	7–6^{(7–0)}, 6–2
Loss	1–1	Feb 1991	Linz, Austria	Carpet (i)	(Switzerland) Manuela Maleeva	4–6, 6–7^{(1–7)}

=== Doubles: 10 (5 titles, 5 runners-up) ===
Legend
Grand Slam tournaments (0–0)
Tier I (0–0)
Tier II (0–0)
Tier III (0–0)
Tier IV (4–3)
Tier V (1–2)

Result	W/L	Date	Tournament	Surface	Partner	Opponents	Score
Win	1–0	Sep 1990	Kitzbühel, Austria	Clay	(Czechoslovakia) Radka Zrubáková	(Italy) Sandra Cecchini (Argentina) Patricia Tarabini	6–0, 6–4
Loss	1–1	Feb 1991	Linz, Austria	Carpet (i)	(Czechoslovakia) Radka Zrubáková	(Switzerland) Manuela Maleeva (Italy) Raffaella Reggi	4–6, 6–1, 3–6
Win	2–1	Jul 1991	Palermo, Italy	Clay	(France) Mary Pierce	(Italy) Laura Garrone (Argentina) Mercedes Paz	6–3, 6–7^{(5–7)}, 6–3
Win	3–1	Sep 1991	Paris, France	Clay	(Czech Republic) Radka Zrubáková	(France) Alexia Dechaume (France) Julie Halard	6–4, 6–4
Loss	3–2	Apr 1992	Kuala Lumpur, Malaysia	Hard (i)	(Japan) Rika Hiraki	(France) Isabelle Demongeot (Ukraine) Natalia Medvedeva	6–2, 4–6, 1–6
Loss	3–3	May 1992	Waregem, Belgium	Clay	(Ukraine) Elena Bryukhovets	(Netherlands) Manon Bollegraf (Netherlands) Caroline Vis	4–6, 3–6
Loss	3–4	Jul 1992	Palermo, Italy	Clay	(Spain) Ana Segura	(United States) Halle Carroll (Argentina) María José Gaidano	3–6, 6–4, 3–6
Win	4–4	Oct 1992	Bayonne, France	Carpet (i)	(Italy) Linda Ferrando	(Germany) Claudia Kohde-Kilsch (United States) Stephanie Rehe	1–6, 6–3, 6–4
Loss	4–5	May 1993	Taranto, Italy	Clay	(Argentina) Mercedes Paz	(United States) Debbie Graham (Netherlands) Brenda Schultz	0–6, 4–6
Win	5–5	Jul 1995	Palermo, Italy	Clay	(Czech Republic) Radka Bobková	(Austria) Petra Schwarz (Slovakia) Katarína Studeníková	6–4, 6–1

== ITF Circuit finals ==
Legend
$100,000 tournaments
$75,000 tournaments
$50,000 tournaments
$25,000 tournaments
$10,000 tournaments

=== Singles (3–2) ===
Result	No.	Date	Tournament	Surface	Opponent	Score
Win	1.	2 May 1988	ITF Bournemouth, United Kingdom	Clay	(United States) Ann Wunderlich	6–7, 6–2, 6–3
Win	2.	5 September 1988	ITF Porto, Portugal	Clay	(Switzerland) Sandrine Jaquet	6–4, 6–1
Loss	3.	6 December 1993	ITF Val-d'Oise, France	Hard (i)	(Russia) Elena Makarova	6–0, 3–6, 2–6
Win	4.	13 December 1993	ITF Přerov, Czech Republic	Hard	(Czech Republic) Eva Krejčová	6–2, 7–6^{(2)}
Loss	5.	8 July 1996	ITF İstanbul, Turkey	Hard	(Czech Republic) Adriana Gerši	0–4 ret.

=== Doubles (8–6) ===
Result	No.	Date	Tournament	Surface	Partner	Opponents	Score
Win	1.	29 September 1986	ITF Šibenik, Yugoslavia	Clay	(Czechoslovakia) Jana Pospíšilová	(Czechoslovakia) Denisa Krajčovičová (Czechoslovakia) Radka Zrubáková	6–1, 6–2
Win	2.	6 October 1986	ITF Mali Lošinj, Yugoslavia	Clay	(Czechoslovakia) Jana Pospíšilová	(Czechoslovakia) Denisa Krajčovičová (Czechoslovakia) Radka Zrubáková	6–3, 7–6
Loss	3.	13 October 1986	ITF Rabac, Yugoslavia	Clay	(Czechoslovakia) Jana Pospíšilová	(Czechoslovakia) Denisa Krajčovičová (Czechoslovakia) Radka Zrubáková	3–6, 2–6
Win	4.	1 June 1987	ITF Adria, Italy	Clay	(Czechoslovakia) Nora Bajčíková	(United States) Erika Smith (Hungary) Réka Szikszay	6–7, 7–5, 6–2
Loss	5.	8 June 1987	ITF Carpi, Italy	Clay	(Czechoslovakia) Nora Bajčíková	(New Zealand) Hana Guy (Australia) Kate McDonald	7–6, 5–7, 5–7
Win	6.	14 September 1987	ITF Sofia, Bulgaria	Clay	(Czechoslovakia) Michaela Frimmelová	(Finland) Anne Aallonen (West Germany) Evelyn Larwig	6–2, 6–2
Win	7.	4 April 1988	ITF Bari, Italy	Clay	(Czechoslovakia) Michaela Frimmelová	(Argentina) Gabriela Castro (Spain) Ana Segura	6–4, 7–5
Loss	8.	27 June 1988	ITF Neumünster, West Germany	Clay	(Czechoslovakia) Hana Fukárková	(Hungary) Antonia Homolya (West Germany) Henrike Kadzidroga	1–6, 2–6
Loss	9.	13 September 1993	ITF Karlovy Vary, Czech Republic	Clay	(Czech Republic) Radka Bobková	(Slovakia) Karina Habšudová (Latvia) Larisa Neiland	3–6, 4–6
Win	10.	27 February 1995	ITF Prostějov, Czech Republic	Hard (i)	(Switzerland) Martina Hingis	(Czech Republic) Eva Melicharová (Poland) Katarzyna Teodorowicz	7–6^{(7–4)}, 6–2
Win	11.	25 September 1995	ITF Bratislava, Slovakia	Clay	(Czech Republic) Radka Zrubáková	(Netherlands) Yvette Basting (Poland) Magdalena Grzybowska	6–3, 6–1
Loss	12.	2 September 1996	ITF Bratislava, Slovakia	Clay	(Czech Republic) Radka Zrubáková	(Slovakia) Denisa Krajčovičová (Hungary) Andrea Temesvári	6–0, 3–6, 3–6
Win	13.	1 November 1997	ITF Poitiers, France	Hard (i)	(Belgium) Nancy Feber	(France) Lea Ghirardi (Bulgaria) Svetlana Krivencheva	3–6, 6–3, 6–1
Loss	14.	10 May 1998	ITF Cardiff, United Kingdom	Clay	(Belgium) Nancy Feber	(South Africa) Liezel Horn (Slovenia) Katarina Srebotnik	4–6, 3–6
