= 1999 Sanex Trophy =

- Date: 2–8 August
- Edition: 1st
- Category: Tier IVa
- Draw: 32S / 16D
- Prize money: $112,500
- Surface: Clay / outdoor
- Location: Knokke-Heist, Belgium

Champions

Singles
- (Spain) María Sánchez Lorenzo

Doubles
- (Czech Republic) Eva Martincová / (Germany) Elena Wagner
WTA Knokke-Heist	· 2000 →

The 1999 Sanex Trophy was a women's tennis tournament played on outdoor clay courts in Knokke-Heist, Belgium that was part of the Tier IVa category of the 1999 WTA Tour. It was the inaugural edition of the tournament and was held from 2 August until 8 August 1999. Fourth-seeded María Sánchez Lorenzo won the singles title and earned $16,000 first-prize money.

== Finals ==
=== Singles ===
(Spain) María Sánchez Lorenzo defeated (Czech Republic) Denisa Chládková, 6–7^{(2–7)}, 6–4, 6–2

- This was Sánchez Lorenzo's only WTA title.

=== Doubles ===
(Czech Republic) Eva Martincová / (Germany) Elena Wagner defeated (Russia) Evgenia Koulikovskaya / (Federal Republic of Yugoslavia) Sandra Naćuk, 3–6, 6–3, 6–3

== Entrants ==
=== Seeds ===
Country	Player	Rank	Seed
ROU	Ruxandra Dragomir	27	1
CRO	Silvija Talaja	36	2
SVK	Karina Habšudová	46	3
ESP	María Sánchez Lorenzo	48	4
ESP	Cristina Torrens Valero	52	5
GER	Barbara Rittner	58	6
BLR	Olga Barabanschikova	57	7
BEL	Laurence Courtois	71	8

=== Other entrants ===
The following players received wildcards into the singles main draw:

- (Netherlands) Michelle Gerards
- (Spain) Marta Marrero

The following players received wildcards into the doubles main draw:

- (Belgium) Kim Clijsters / (Belgium) Justine Henin

The following players received entry from the singles qualifying draw:

- (Germany) Angelika Bachmann
- (Spain) Mariam Ramon Climent
- (Russia) Anastasia Myskina
- (Italy) Antonella Serra Zanetti

The following players received entry from the doubles qualifying draw:

- (Germany) Petra Begerow / (Italy) Antonella Serra Zanetti
- (United Kingdom) Hannah Collin / (Spain) Marta Marrero
