= 1996 Rexona Cup – Singles =

Singles
- 1996 Rexona Cup

Final
- Champion: (Spain) Arantxa Sánchez Vicario
- Runner-up: (Spain) Conchita Martínez
- Score: 4–6, 7–6, 6–0

Details
- Draw: 28 (4 Q / 2 WC )
- Seeds: 8

Events
Singles	Doubles
← 1995 ·	WTA German Open	· 1997 →

The 1996 Rexona Cup singles was a tennis event played on outdoor clay courts at the Am Rothenbaum in Hamburg in Germany that was part of Tier II of the 1996 WTA Tour. The 1996 Rexona Cup tournament was held from April 29 through May 5, 1996.

Conchita Martínez was the defending champion but lost in the final 4–6, 7–6, 6–0 against Arantxa Sánchez Vicario.

== Seeds ==
A champion seed is indicated in bold text while text in italics indicates the round in which that seed was eliminated. The top four seeds received a bye to the second round.

1. (Spain) **Arantxa Sánchez Vicario (champion)**
2. (Spain) Conchita Martínez (final)
3. (Netherlands) Brenda Schultz-McCarthy (quarterfinals)
4. (France) Mary Pierce (semifinals)
5. (Switzerland) Martina Hingis (quarterfinals)
6. (France) Julie Halard-Decugis (semifinals)
7. (Austria) Judith Wiesner (second round)
8. (Germany) Petra Begerow (first round)

== Draw ==
=== Key ===
- Q = Qualifier
- WC = Wild card
- LL = Lucky loser
- Alt = Alternate
- ITF = ITF entry
- PR = Protected ranking
- SR = Special ranking
- SE = Special exempt
- JE = Junior exempt
- JR = Junior Accelerator Programme entrant
- CO = College Accelerator Programme entrant
- NG = Next Gen Accelerator Program entrant
- w/o = Walkover
- r = Retired
- d = Defaulted

=== Final ===
Final
1	(Spain) **Arantxa Sánchez Vicario**	4	**7**	**6**
2	(Spain) Conchita Martínez	**6**	6	0

=== Section 1 ===
First round
(United States) S Cacic	**7**	4	2
(Switzerland) **P Schnyder**	6	**6**	**6**
Q	(Spain) **Á Montolio**	**6**	**6**
(Netherlands) M Oremans	0	2
Q	(Czech Republic) R Bobková	1	1
7	(Austria) **J Wiesner**	**6**	**6**
(Italy) A Serra Zanetti	1	4
(Spain) **V Ruano-Pascual**	**6**	**6**
WC	(Germany) **A Glass**	**6**	**6**
Q	(Sweden) M Strandlund	3	4
(Germany) J Kandarr	3	2
6	(France) **J Halard-Decugis**	**6**	**6**

Second round
1	(Spain) **A Sánchez Vicario**	**6**	**6**
(Switzerland) P Schnyder	2	0
Q	(Spain) **Á Montolio**	**7**	**6**
7	(Austria) J Wiesner	5	2
3	(Netherlands) **B Schultz-McCarthy**	1	**6**	**6**
(Spain) V Ruano-Pascual	**6**	2	2
WC	(Germany) A Glass	3	1
6	(France) **J Halard-Decugis**	**6**	**6**

Quarterfinals
1	(Spain) **A Sánchez Vicario**	**6**	**6**
Q	(Spain) Á Montolio	4	2
3	(Netherlands) B Schultz-McCarthy	0	1
6	(France) **J Halard-Decugis**	**6**	**6**

Semifinals
1	(Spain) **A Sánchez Vicario**	**6**	**6**
6	(France) J Halard-Decugis	2	0

=== Section 2 ===
First round
5	(Switzerland) **M Hingis**	**6**	**6**
Q	(Argentina) M Paz	1	1
WC	(Germany) S Klösel	4	4
(Germany) **B Rittner**	**6**	**6**
(Bulgaria) E Pampoulova	1	1
(Netherlands) **K Boogert**	**6**	**6**
8	(Germany) P Begerow	3	4
(Sweden) **Å Carlsson**	**6**	**6**
(Romania) **R Dragomir**	3	**6**	**6**
(Germany) W Probst	**6**	4	1
(Germany) S Meier	4	5
Q	(Poland) **K Nowak**	**6**	**7**

Second round
5	(Switzerland) **M Hingis**	**6**	**6**
(Germany) B Rittner	2	4
(Netherlands) K Boogert	4	**6**	1
4	(France) **M Pierce**	**6**	2	**6**
(Sweden) Å Carlsson	4	**6**	4
(Romania) **R Dragomir**	**6**	3	**6**
Q	(Poland) K Nowak	0	0
2	(Spain) **C Martínez**	**6**	**6**

Quarterfinals
5	(Switzerland) M Hingis	6	2
4	(France) **M Pierce**	**7**	**6**
(Romania) R Dragomir	4	2
2	(Spain) **C Martínez**	**6**	**6**

Semifinals
4	(France) M Pierce	1	1
2	(Spain) **C Martínez**	**6**	**6**
