= 1999 Sanex Trophy – Singles =

Singles
- 1999 Sanex Trophy

Final
- Champion: (Spain) María Sánchez Lorenzo
- Runner-up: (Czech Republic) Denisa Chládková
- Score: 6–7^{(7–9)}, 6–4, 6–2

Details
- Draw: 32
- Seeds: 8

Events
| Singles | Doubles |
| Sanex Trophy | · 2000 → |

The 1999 Sanex Trophy singles was the singles event of the first edition of the Sanex Trophy; a WTA Tier IV tournament and one of the most prestigious women's tennis tournament held in Belgium.

Fourth seed María Sánchez Lorenzo won the title, defeating Denisa Chládková, 6–7^{(7–9)}, 6–4, 6–2, and claimed her only title.

== Seeds ==
1. (Romania) Ruxandra Dragomir (first round)
2. (Croatia) Silvija Talaja (semifinals)
3. (Slovakia) Karina Habšudová (quarterfinals)
4. (Spain) María Sánchez Lorenzo (champion)
5. (Spain) Cristina Torrens Valero (second round)
6. (Germany) Barbara Rittner (semifinals)
7. (Belarus) Olga Barabanschikova (second round)
8. (Belgium) Laurence Courtois (second round)

== Draw ==
=== Key ===
- Q = Qualifier
- WC = Wild card
- LL = Lucky loser
- Alt = Alternate
- ITF = ITF entry
- PR = Protected ranking
- SR = Special ranking
- SE = Special exempt
- JE = Junior exempt
- JR = Junior Accelerator Programme entrant
- CO = College Accelerator Programme entrant
- NG = Next Gen Accelerator Program entrant
- w/o = Walkover
- r = Retired
- d = Defaulted

=== Finals ===
Semifinals
6 | (Germany) Barbara Rittner | 3 | 4
4 | (Spain) María Sánchez Lorenzo | 6 | 6
(Czech Republic) Denisa Chládková | 6 | 6
2 | (Croatia) Silvija Talaja | 2 | 2

Final
4 | (Spain) María Sánchez Lorenzo | 6^{7} | 6 | 6
(Czech Republic) Denisa Chládková | 7^{9} | 4 | 2

=== Top half ===
First round
1 | (Romania) R Dragomir | 4 | 3
(Belgium) S Appelmans | 6 | 6
(France) A Dechaume-Balleret | 6 | 6
(Germany) E Wagner | 4 | 1
(Sweden) Å Carlsson | 4 | 1
(South Africa) J Kruger | 6 | 6
(Czech Republic) S Kleinová | 2 | 2
6 | (Germany) B Rittner | 6 | 6
4 | (Spain) M Sánchez Lorenzo | 6 | 6
(Romania) R Sandu | 1 | 1
(Federal Republic of Yugoslavia) S Naćuk | 1 | 6 | 1
(Hungary) R Kuti-Kis | 6 | 1 | 6
WC | (Netherlands) M Gerards | 6 | 3 | 1
WC | (Spain) M Marrero | 3 | 6 | 6
(Bulgaria) L Bacheva | 6^{4} | 3
7 | (Belarus) O Barabanschikova | 7^{7} | 6

Second round
(Belgium) S Appelmans | 6 | 7
(France) A Dechaume-Balleret | 0 | 5
(South Africa) J Kruger | 3 | 3
6 | (Germany) B Rittner | 6 | 6
4 | (Spain) M Sánchez Lorenzo | 7^{10} | 7^{12}
(Hungary) R Kuti-Kis | 6^{8} | 6^{10}
WC | (Spain) M Marrero | 5 | 6 | 6
7 | (Belarus) O Barabanschikova | 7 | 3 | 4

Quarterfinals
(Belgium) S Appelmans | 3 | 4
6 | (Germany) B Rittner | 6 | 6
4 | (Spain) M Sánchez Lorenzo | 6 | 6
WC | (Spain) M Marrero | 3 | 3

Semifinals
6 | (Germany) B Rittner | 3 | 4
4 | (Spain) M Sánchez Lorenzo | 6 | 6

=== Bottom half ===
First round
5 | (Spain) C Torrens Valero | 7^{7} | 6
(Netherlands) S Noorlander | 6^{5} | 2
(Czech Republic) D Chládková | 7 | 2 | 7^{7}
(France) É Loit | 5 | 6 | 6^{4}
(Netherlands) A Hopmans | 4 | 6 | 1
Q | (Germany) A Bachmann | 6 | 3 | 6
(Belgium) K Clijsters | 4 | 0
3 | (Slovakia) K Habšudová | 6 | 6
8 | (Belgium) L Courtois | 6 | 3 | 6
(Belgium) J Henin | 4 | 6 | 4
Q | (Spain) M Ramon Climent | 6 | 6
(France) A Cocheteux | 2 | 1
Q | (Russia) A Myskina | 3 | 5
(Spain) Á Montolio | 6 | 7
Q | (Italy) A Serra Zanetti | 3 | 7 | 2
2 | (Croatia) S Talaja | 6 | 5 | 6

Second round
(Spain) C Torrens Valero | 6^{5} | 2
(Czech Republic) D Chládková | 7^{7} | 6
Q | (Germany) A Bachmann | 6^{3} | 0
3 | (Slovakia) K Habšudová | 7^{7} | 6
8 | (Belgium) L Courtois | 7 | 3 | 6^{3}
Q | (Spain) M Ramon Climent | 5 | 6 | 7^{7}
(Spain) Á Montolio | 4 | 2
2 | (Croatia) S Talaja | 6 | 6

Quarterfinals
(Czech Republic) D Chládková | 2 | 6 | 6
3 | (Slovakia) K Habšudová | 6 | 4 | 2
Q | (Spain) M Ramon Climent | 3 | 3
2 | (Croatia) S Talaja | 6 | 6

Semifinals
(Czech Republic) D Chládková | 6 | 6
2 | (Croatia) S Talaja | 2 | 2

== Qualifying ==
=== Seeds ===
1. (Czech Republic) Lenka Němečková (qualifying competition)
2. (Russia) Evgenia Kulikovskaya (first round)
3. (Russia) Anastasia Myskina (Qualifier)
4. (Russia) Nadia Petrova (second round)
5. replaced by (Belgium) Evy de Mesmaecker (first round)
6. (Romania) Andreea Vanc (first round)
7. (Spain) Mariam Ramon Climent (Qualifier)
8. (Italy) Giulia Casoni (second round)

=== Qualifiers ===
1. (Spain) Mariam Ramon Climent
2. (Germany) Angelika Bachmann
3. (Russia) Anastasia Myskina
4. (Italy) Antonella Serra Zanetti

== Qualifying draw ==
=== Key ===
- Q = Qualifier
- WC = Wild card
- LL = Lucky loser
- Alt = Alternate
- ITF = ITF entry
- PR = Protected ranking
- SR = Special ranking
- SE = Special exempt
- JE = Junior exempt
- JR = Junior Accelerator Programme entrant
- CO = College Accelerator Programme entrant
- NG = Next Gen Accelerator Program entrant
- w/o = Walkover
- r = Retired
- d = Defaulted

=== First qualifier ===
First round
1 | (Czech Republic) Lenka Němečková | 6 | 6
(Germany) Marketa Kochta | 3 | 2
(France) Laurence Andretto | 4 | 2
WC | (United Kingdom) Hannah Collin | 6 | 6
WC | (Sweden) Sofia Arvidsson | 4 | 6 | 3
(Germany) Vanessa Henke | 6 | 2 | 6
WC | (Belgium) Cindy Schuurmans | 1 | 0
7 | (Spain) Mariam Ramon Climent | 6 | 6

Second round
(Czech Republic) Lenka Němečková | 5 | 6 | 6
WC | (United Kingdom) Hannah Collin | 7 | 4 | 3
(Germany) Vanessa Henke | 2 | 3
7 | (Spain) Mariam Ramon Climent | 6 | 6

Qualifying competition
1 | (Czech Republic) Lenka Němečková | 0 | 0^{r}
7 | (Spain) Mariam Ramon Climent | 6 | 1

=== Second qualifier ===
First round
4 | (Russia) Nadia Petrova | 6 | 1 | 7
(Germany) Sandra Klösel | 3 | 6 | 5
(Germany) Angelika Bachmann | 7 | 6
(United Kingdom) Karen Cross | 5 | 0
(Bulgaria) Desislava Topavola | 6 | 6
(Germany) Nina Nittinger | 2 | 2
(Czech Republic) Eva Martincová | 6 | 6
Alt | (Belgium) Evy de Mesmaecker | 2 | 0

Second round
4 | (Russia) Nadia Petrova | 4 | 4
(Germany) Angelika Bachmann | 6 | 6
(Bulgaria) Desislava Topavola | 6 | 4 | 6^{5}
(Czech Republic) Eva Martincová | 4 | 6 | 7^{7}

Qualifying competition
(Germany) Angelika Bachmann | 6 | 6
(Czech Republic) Eva Martincová | 2 | 4

=== Third qualifier ===
First round
6 | (Romania) Andreea Vanc | 3 | 1
(Italy) Francesca Schiavone | 6 | 6
(Slovakia) Martina Suchá | 7^{7} | 6
(Czech Republic) Radka Pelikánová | 6^{3} | 0
(Germany) Petra Begerow | 6 | 3 | 6
(Australia) Mireille Dittmann | 2 | 6 | 2
(Spain) Ainhoa Goñi Blanco | 2 | 7 | 4
3 | (Russia) Anastasia Myskina | 6 | 5 | 6

Second round
(Italy) Francesca Schiavone | 6 | 1 | 3
(Slovakia) Martina Suchá | 4 | 6 | 6
(Germany) Petra Begerow | 5 | 4
3 | (Russia) Anastasia Myskina | 7 | 6

Qualifying competition
(Slovakia) Martina Suchá | 1 | 3
3 | (Russia) Anastasia Myskina | 6 | 6

=== Fourth qualifier ===
First round
8 | (Italy) Giulia Casoni | 0 | 7 | 6
(Italy) Maria Paola Zavagli | 6 | 5 | 4
(Italy) Antonella Serra Zanetti | 6 | 6
(Australia) Natalie Dittmann | 2 | 3
WC | (Belgium) Daphne van de Zande | 6 | 6^{7} | 7
(Hungary) Katalin Marosi | 2 | 7^{9} | 5
(Spain) Conchita Martínez Granados | 6 | 4 | 6
2 | (Russia) Evgenia Kulikovskaya | 3 | 6 | 3

Second round
8 | (Italy) Giulia Casoni | 6 | 4 | 1
(Italy) Antonella Serra Zanetti | 3 | 6 | 6
WC | (Belgium) Daphne van de Zande | 5 | 6 | 6
(Spain) Conchita Martínez Granados | 7 | 4 | 4

Qualifying competition
(Italy) Antonella Serra Zanetti | 0 | 6 | 6
WC | (Belgium) Daphne van de Zande | 6 | 1 | 3
