= 1993 Citizen Cup – Singles =

Singles
- 1993 Citizen Cup

Final
- Champion: (Spain) Arantxa Sánchez Vicario
- Runner-up: (Germany) Steffi Graf
- Score: 6–3, 6–3

Details
- Draw: 32 (4Q)
- Seeds: 8

Events
Singles	Doubles
← 1992 ·	WTA German Open	· 1994 →

Steffi Graf was the six-time defending champion, but she lost to Arantxa Sánchez Vicario in the final, 6–3, 6–3.

== Seeds ==
1. (Federal Republic of Yugoslavia) Monica Seles (quarterfinals, stabbed during match)
2. (Germany) Steffi Graf (final)
3. (Spain) Arantxa Sánchez Vicario (champion)
4. (Czech Republic) Jana Novotná (semifinals)
5. (Switzerland) Manuela Maleeva-Fragniere (quarterfinals)
6. (Germany) Anke Huber (quarterfinals)
7. (Bulgaria) Magdalena Maleeva (semifinals)
8. (Bulgaria) Katerina Maleeva (quarterfinals)

== Draw ==
Key

- Q = Qualifier
- WC = Wild card
- LL = Lucky loser
- Alt = Alternate
- ITF = ITF entry
- PR = Protected ranking
- SR = Special ranking
- SE = Special exempt
- JE = Junior exempt
- JR = Junior Accelerator Programme entrant
- CO = College Accelerator Programme entrant
- NG = Next Gen Accelerator Program entrant
- w/o = Walkover
- r = Retired
- d = Defaulted

=== Finals ===
Semifinals
7	(Bulgaria) Magdalena Maleeva	2	6^{4}
3	(Spain) Arantxa Sánchez Vicario	6	7^{7}
4	(Czech Republic) Jana Novotná	3	6	1
2	(Germany) Steffi Graf	6	3	6

Final
3	(Spain) Arantxa Sánchez Vicario	6	6
2	(Germany) Steffi Graf	3	3

=== Top half ===
First round
1	(Federal Republic of Yugoslavia) M Seles	6	6
Q	(Sweden) M Strandlund	2	2
(Germany) S Frankl	4	1
(Argentina) P Tarabini	6	6
(Germany) W Probst	6	6
(United States) J Santrock	3	1
(Germany) C Singer	4	5
7	(Bulgaria) M Maleeva	6	7
3	(Spain) A Sánchez Vicario	7^{7}	6
Q	(Austria) B Reinstadler	6^{4}	3
(Germany) M Babel	6	4	4
(Germany) B Rittner	4	6	6
(Italy) N Baudone	6	3	7
(Ukraine) N Medvedeva	1	6	5
(Germany) K Kschwendt	6	3	4
5	(Switzerland) M Maleeva-Fragniere	0	6	6

Second round
1	(Federal Republic of Yugoslavia) M Seles	6	6
(Argentina) P Tarabini	2	2
(Germany) W Probst	1	6^{1}
7	(Bulgaria) M Maleeva	6	7^{7}
3	(Spain) A Sánchez Vicario	6	0
(Germany) B Rittner	1	0^{r}
(Italy) N Baudone	0	1
5	(Switzerland) M Maleeva-Fragniere	6	6

Quarterfinals
1	(Federal Republic of Yugoslavia) M Seles (details)	6	4^{r}
7	(Bulgaria) M Maleeva	4	3
3	(Spain) A Sánchez Vicario	7	6
5	(Switzerland) M Maleeva-Fragniere	5	1

Semifinals
7	(Bulgaria) M Maleeva	2	6^{4}
3	(Spain) A Sánchez Vicario	6	7^{7}

=== Bottom half ===
First round
6	(Germany) A Huber	6	6^{6}	6
(Argentina) B Fulco	4	7^{8}	2
(France) N van Lottum	6	4	4
Q	(Germany) P Begerow	4	6	6
(France) S Testud	3	0
(Germany) H Rusch	6	6
(United Kingdom) J Durie	0	2
4	(Czech Republic) J Novotná	6	6
8	(Bulgaria) K Maleeva	6	6
LL	(Ukraine) E Brioukhovets	3	4
(Czech Republic) K Kroupová	7	6
(Germany) M Zivec-Skulj	5	3
(Latvia) L Neiland	4	0
(Georgia (country)) L Meskhi	6	6
(Austria) J Wiesner	2	5
2	(Germany) S Graf	6	7

Second round
6	(Germany) A Huber	6	5	6
Q	(Germany) P Begerow	1	7	1
(Germany) H Rusch	3	3
4	(Czech Republic) J Novotná	6	6
8	(Bulgaria) K Maleeva	6	6
(Czech Republic) K Kroupová	4	3
(Georgia (country)) L Meskhi	1	2
2	(Germany) S Graf	6	6

Quarterfinals
6	(Germany) A Huber	1	3
4	(Czech Republic) J Novotná	6	6
8	(Bulgaria) K Maleeva	3	1
2	(Germany) S Graf	6	6

Semifinals
4	(Czech Republic) J Novotná	3	6	1
2	(Germany) S Graf	6	3	6
