= 1999 Betty Barclay Cup – Singles =

Singles
- 1999 Betty Barclay Cup

Final
- Champion: (United States) Venus Williams
- Runner-up: (France) Mary Pierce
- Score: 6–0, 6–3

Details
- Draw: 28 (4 Q / 2 WC )
- Seeds: 8

Events
Singles	Doubles
← 1998 ·	WTA German Open	· 2000 →

The 1999 Betty Barclay Cup singles was the singles event of the fifteenth edition of the Betty Barclay Cup, a WTA Tier II tournament held in Hamburg, Germany and part of the European claycourt season. Martina Hingis was the reigning champion but she did not compete that year.

Venus Williams won in the final 6–0, 6–3 against Mary Pierce.

== Seeds ==
The top four seeds received a bye to the second round.

1. (Czech Republic) Jana Novotná (quarterfinals)
2. (United States) Venus Williams (champion)
3. (Spain) Arantxa Sánchez Vicario (semifinals)
4. (France) Mary Pierce (final)
5. (France) Nathalie Tauziat (second round)
6. (Belgium) Dominique Van Roost (second round)
7. (South Africa) Amanda Coetzer (quarterfinals)
8. (Spain) Conchita Martínez (quarterfinals)

== Draw ==
Key

- Q = Qualifier
- WC = Wild card
- LL = Lucky loser
- Alt = Alternate
- ITF = ITF entry
- PR = Protected ranking
- SR = Special ranking
- SE = Special exempt
- JE = Junior exempt
- JR = Junior Accelerator Programme entrant
- CO = College Accelerator Programme entrant
- NG = Next Gen Accelerator Program entrant
- w/o = Walkover
- r = Retired
- d = Defaulted

=== Finals ===
Semifinals
(Austria) Barbara Schett	6	2	4
4	(France) Mary Pierce	2	6	6
3	(Spain) Arantxa Sánchez Vicario	1	3
2	(United States) Venus Williams	6	6

Final
4	(France) Mary Pierce	0	3
2	(United States) Venus Williams	6	6

=== Top half ===
First round
Q	(Austria) M Maruska	2	2
(Luxembourg) A Kremer	6	6
(Austria) B Schett	3	6	7^{7}
(Romania) R Dragomir	6	2	6^{5}
(Russia) E Likhovtseva	4	1
5	(France) N Tauziat	6	6
(Romania) I Spîrlea	7^{7}	2	6^{1}
(France) A-G Sidot	6^{5}	6	7^{7}
Q	(Germany) A Barna	4	5
WC	(Germany) A Glass	6	7
WC	(Germany) J Abe	3	2
8	(Spain) C Martínez	6	6

Second round
1	(Czech Republic) J Novotná	6	6
(Luxembourg) A Kremer	4	2
(Austria) B Schett	3	6	6
5	(France) N Tauziat	6	4	0
4	(France) M Pierce	6	5	7
(France) A-G Sidot	2	7	5
WC	(Germany) A Glass	6	5	1
8	(Spain) C Martínez	4	7	6

Quarterfinals
1	(Czech Republic) J Novotná	4	3
(Austria) B Schett	6	6
4	(France) M Pierce	6	6
8	(Spain) C Martínez	4	4

Semifinals
(Austria) B Schett	6	2	4
4	(France) M Pierce	2	6	6

=== Bottom half ===
First round
6	(Belgium) D Van Roost	6	6
(Germany) B Rittner	4	0
(Italy) S Farina	6	6
Q	(Russia) E Dementieva	3	1
(France) A Fusai	6^{3}	2
(Spain) M Sánchez Lorenzo	7^{7}	6
7	(South Africa) A Coetzer	6	7^{7}
(Spain) V Ruano Pascual	3	6^{4}
Q	(Canada) J Nejedly	2	5
(Spain) G León García	6	7
(Austria) S Plischke	0	3
(Spain) M Serna	6	6

Second round
6	(Belgium) D Van Roost	6	5	6^{10}
(Italy) S Farina	2	7	7^{12}
(Spain) M Sánchez Lorenzo	3	0
3	(Spain) A Sánchez Vicario	6	6
7	(South Africa) A Coetzer	6	6
(Spain) G León García	2	1
(Spain) M Serna	3	1
2	(United States) V Williams	6	6

Quarterfinals
(Italy) S Farina	2	4
3	(Spain) A Sánchez Vicario	6	6
7	(South Africa) A Coetzer	4	3
2	(United States) V Williams	6	6

Semifinals
3	(Spain) A Sánchez Vicario	1	3
2	(United States) V Williams	6	6

== Qualifying ==
=== Seeds ===
1. (Canada) Maureen Drake (second round)
2. (Russia) Tatiana Panova (second round)
3. (Czech Republic) Květa Hrdličková (qualifying competition)
4. (Germany) Elena Wagner (first round)
5. (Italy) Laura Golarsa (first round)
6. (Netherlands) Seda Noorlander (second round)
7. (Canada) Jana Nejedly (Qualifier)
8. (Latvia) Larisa Neiland (second round)

=== Qualifiers ===
1. (Germany) Anca Barna
2. (Russia) Elena Dementieva
3. (Canada) Jana Nejedly
4. (Austria) Marion Maruska

== Qualifying draw ==
Key

- Q = Qualifier
- WC = Wild card
- LL = Lucky loser
- Alt = Alternate
- ITF = ITF entry
- PR = Protected ranking
- SR = Special ranking
- SE = Special exempt
- JE = Junior exempt
- JR = Junior Accelerator Programme entrant
- CO = College Accelerator Programme entrant
- NG = Next Gen Accelerator Program entrant
- w/o = Walkover
- r = Retired
- d = Defaulted

=== First qualifier ===
First round
1	(Canada) Maureen Drake	6	6
WC	(Germany) Lydia Steinbach	2	3
(Federal Republic of Yugoslavia) Sandra Naćuk	6	6
(Germany) Sandra Klösel	2	1
(Germany) Anca Barna	1	7	6
(Poland) Aleksandra Olsza	6	5	1
(Germany) Gabriela Kučerová	3	1
8	(Latvia) Larisa Neiland	6	6

Second round
1	(Canada) Maureen Drake	1	3
(Federal Republic of Yugoslavia) Sandra Naćuk	6	6
(Germany) Anca Barna	6	6
8	(Latvia) Larisa Neiland	3	3

Qualifying competition
(Federal Republic of Yugoslavia) Sandra Naćuk	3	7	3
(Germany) Anca Barna	6	5	6

=== Second qualifier ===
First round
4	(Germany) Elena Wagner	2	3
WC	(Germany) Vanessa Henke	6	6
(Russia) Elena Dementieva	3	7	6
(Bulgaria) Lubomira Bacheva	6	5	4
(Germany) Jana Kandarr	3	7^{7}	7^{9}
WC	(Germany) Angelika Bachmann	6	6^{4}	6^{7}
(United Kingdom) Lorna Woodroffe	3	5
6	(Netherlands) Seda Noorlander	6	7

Second round
WC	(Germany) Vanessa Henke	2	2
(Russia) Elena Dementieva	6	6
(Germany) Jana Kandarr	6	6
6	(Netherlands) Seda Noorlander	1	2

Qualifying competition
(Russia) Elena Dementieva	6	6
(Germany) Jana Kandarr	4	3

=== Third qualifier ===
First round
7	(Canada) Jana Nejedly	7	6
(Austria) Patricia Wartusch	5	4
(Austria) Sandra Dopfer	6	2	6
(Bulgaria) Pavlina Stoyanova	2	6	2
(Germany) Miriam Schnitzer	0	0
WC	(Germany) Martina Müller	6	6
(Germany) Jasmin Wöhr	6	4	3
3	(Czech Republic) Květa Hrdličková	2	6	6

Second round
7	(Canada) Jana Nejedly	6	6
(Austria) Sandra Dopfer	3	4
WC	(Germany) Martina Müller	3	6^{3}
3	(Czech Republic) Květa Hrdličková	6	7^{7}

Qualifying competition
7	(Canada) Jana Nejedly	6	6^{3}	6
3	(Czech Republic) Květa Hrdličková	2	7^{7}	2

=== Fourth qualifier ===
First round
5	(Italy) Laura Golarsa	3	5
(Ukraine) Olga Lugina	6	7
(Czech Republic) Radka Pelikánová	6	6^{1}	7^{10}
(United Kingdom) Karen Cross	3	7^{7}	6^{8}
(Austria) Marion Maruska	7	6
(South Africa) Liezel Horn	5	2
(Germany) Petra Begerow	7^{7}	4	3
2	(Russia) Tatiana Panova	6^{5}	6	6

Second round
(Ukraine) Olga Lugina	6	6
(Czech Republic) Radka Pelikánová	2	3
(Austria) Marion Maruska	6	7^{8}
2	(Russia) Tatiana Panova	3	6^{6}

Qualifying competition
(Ukraine) Olga Lugina	5	3
(Austria) Marion Maruska	7	6
