= 1994 Citizen Cup – Singles =

Singles
- 1994 Citizen Cup

Final
- Champion: (Spain) Arantxa Sánchez Vicario
- Runner-up: (Germany) Steffi Graf
- Score: 4–6, 7–6^{(7–3)}, 7–6^{(8–6)}

Details
- Draw: 32 (2WC/4Q/1LL)
- Seeds: 8

Events
Singles	Doubles
← 1993 ·	Hamburg European Open	· 1995 →

Arantxa Sánchez Vicario successfully defended her title, by defeating Steffi Graf 4–6, 7–6^{(7–3)}, 7–6^{(8–6)} in the final.

== Seeds ==
1. (Germany) Steffi Graf (final)
2. (Spain) Arantxa Sánchez Vicario (champion)
3. (Czech Republic) Jana Novotná (semifinals)
4. (Germany) Anke Huber (quarterfinals)
5. (Bulgaria) Magdalena Maleeva (quarterfinals)
6. (Germany) Sabine Hack (semifinals)
7. (Ukraine) Natalia Medvedeva (first round)
8. (Bulgaria) Katerina Maleeva (second round)

== Draw ==
Key

- Q = Qualifier
- WC = Wild card
- LL = Lucky loser
- Alt = Alternate
- ITF = ITF entry
- PR = Protected ranking
- SR = Special ranking
- SE = Special exempt
- JE = Junior exempt
- JR = Junior Accelerator Programme entrant
- CO = College Accelerator Programme entrant
- NG = Next Gen Accelerator Program entrant
- w/o = Walkover
- r = Retired
- d = Defaulted

=== Finals ===
Semifinals
1	(Germany) Steffi Graf	6	6
3	(Czech Republic) Jana Novotná	3	3
6	(Germany) Sabine Hack	2	6^{3}
2	(Spain) Arantxa Sánchez Vicario	6	7^{7}

Final
1	(Germany) Steffi Graf	6	6^{3}	6^{6}
2	(Spain) Arantxa Sánchez Vicario	4	7^{7}	7^{8}

=== Top half ===
First round
1	(Germany) S Graf	6	6
(Germany) S Frankl	0	0
(Italy) L Ferrando	6	6
WC	(Germany) H Rusch	3	0
(Germany) M Kochta	5	4
Q	(Czech Republic) P Rajzlová	7	6
(Italy) L Golarsa	0	1
5	(Bulgaria) M Maleeva	6	6
3	(Czech Republic) J Novotná	6	6
(Kazakhstan) E Likhovtseva	3	3
(United States) A Grossman	7^{7}	6^{4}	2
(Russia) E Makarova	6^{5}	7^{7}	6
(Ukraine) E Brioukhovets	1	6	3
(Germany) B Rittner	6	4	6
(Germany) P Begerow	7	7
7	(Ukraine) N Medvedeva	5	5

Second round
1	(Germany) S Graf	6	6
(Italy) L Ferrando	1	1
Q	(Czech Republic) P Rajzlová	1	4
5	(Bulgaria) M Maleeva	6	6
3	(Czech Republic) J Novotná	6	6
(Russia) E Makarova	1	1
(Germany) B Rittner	6	5	7
(Germany) P Begerow	4	7	5

Quarterfinals
1	(Germany) S Graf	7	3	6
5	(Bulgaria) M Maleeva	5	6	0
3	(Czech Republic) J Novotná	6	6
(Germany) B Rittner	2	2

Semifinals
1	(Germany) S Graf	6	6
3	(Czech Republic) J Novotná	3	3

=== Bottom half ===
First round
6	(Germany) S Hack	6	7^{8}
Q	(Czech Republic) K Hrdličková	2	6^{6}
(Germany) M Babel	6	6
WC	(Germany) S Meier	4	1
Q	(Poland) K Nowak	3	7^{9}	6
(Germany) W Probst	6	6^{7}	4
(Russia) E Maniokova	2	1
4	(Germany) A Huber	6	6
8	(Bulgaria) K Maleeva	6	6
(United Kingdom) C Wood	2	0
(Georgia (country)) L Meskhi	7	6
(Argentina) P Tarabini	5	2
(Czech Republic) K Kroupová	0	1
LL	(Argentina) B Fulco-Villella	6	6
Q	(Bulgaria) E Pampoulova	6	3	6^{4}
2	(Spain) A Sánchez Vicario	4	6	7^{7}

Second round
6	(Germany) S Hack	6	3	6
(Germany) M Babel	3	6	1
Q	(Poland) K Nowak	6	4	1
4	(Germany) A Huber	3	6	6
8	(Bulgaria) K Maleeva	0	6	1
(Georgia (country)) L Meskhi	6	4	6
LL	(Argentina) B Fulco-Villella	3	0
2	(Spain) A Sánchez Vicario	6	6

Quarterfinals
6	(Germany) S Hack	6	6
4	(Germany) A Huber	3	3
(Georgia (country)) L Meskhi	2	6^{3}
2	(Spain) A Sánchez Vicario	6	7^{7}

Semifinals
6	(Germany) S Hack	2	6^{3}
2	(Spain) A Sánchez Vicario	6	7^{7}
