= 1996 Rexona Cup – Doubles =

Doubles
- 1996 Rexona Cup

Final
- Champions: (Spain) Arantxa Sánchez Vicario (Netherlands) Brenda Schultz-McCarthy
- Runners-up: (United States) Gigi Fernández (Switzerland) Martina Hingis
- Score: 4–6, 7–6, 6–4

Details
- Draw: 14
- Seeds: 4

Events
Singles	Doubles
← 1995 ·	Hamburg European Open	· 1997 →

The 1996 Rexona Cup – Singles was a tennis event played on outdoor clay courts at the Am Rothenbaum in Hamburg in Germany that was part of Tier II of the 1996 WTA Tour. The 1996 Rexona Cup tournament was held from April 29 through May 5, 1996.

Gigi Fernández and Martina Hingis were the defending champions but lost in the final 4–6, 7–6, 6–4 against Arantxa Sánchez Vicario and Brenda Schultz-McCarthy.

== Seeds ==
Champion seeds are indicated in bold text while text in italics indicates the round in which those seeds were eliminated. The top two seeded teams received byes into the quarterfinals.

1. (Spain) **Arantxa Sánchez Vicario** / (Netherlands) **Brenda Schultz-McCarthy (champions)**
2. (United States) Gigi Fernández / (Switzerland) Martina Hingis (final)
3. (Spain) Conchita Martínez / (Argentina) Patricia Tarabini (semifinals)
4. (Netherlands) Kristie Boogert / (Netherlands) Miriam Oremans (semifinals)

== Draw ==
=== Key ===
- Q = Qualifier
- WC = Wild card
- LL = Lucky loser
- Alt = Alternate
- ITF = ITF entry
- PR = Protected ranking
- SR = Special ranking
- SE = Special exempt
- JE = Junior exempt
- JR = Junior Accelerator Programme entrant
- CO = College Accelerator Programme entrant
- NG = Next Gen Accelerator Program entrant
- w/o = Walkover
- r = Retired
- d = Defaulted

First round
(Romania) **R Dragomir** (Argentina) **M Paz**	**6**	**6**
(Germany) S Klösel (Switzerland) P Schnyder	2	2
4	(Netherlands) **K Boogert** (Netherlands) **M Oremans**	**6**	**6**
(Germany) A Glass (Germany) S Meier	4	4
(Spain) **Á Montolio** (Spain) **V Ruano-Pascual**	**6**	**6**
(Czech Republic) R Bobková (United States) S Cacic	0	3
(Sweden) **Å Carlsson** (Bulgaria) **E Pampoulova**	**6**	**6**
(Germany) P Begerow (Italy) A Serra Zanetti	2	2
(Germany) J Kandarr (Germany) B Rittner	2	3
3	(Spain) **C Martínez** (Argentina) **P Tarabini**	**6**	**6**
(Sweden) M Lindström (Sweden) M Strandlund	4	2
(France) **M Pierce** (Netherlands) **C Vis**	**6**	**6**

Quarterfinals
1	(Spain) **A Sánchez Vicario** (Netherlands) **B Schultz-McCarthy**	**6**	**6**
(Romania) R Dragomir (Argentina) M Paz	0	1
4	(Netherlands) **K Boogert** (Netherlands) **M Oremans**	**6**	**6**
(Spain) Á Montolio (Spain) V Ruano-Pascual	1	1
(Sweden) Å Carlsson (Bulgaria) E Pampoulova	4	**6**	3
3	(Spain) **C Martínez** (Argentina) **P Tarabini**	**6**	4	**6**
(France) M Pierce (Netherlands) C Vis	1	2
2	(United States) **G Fernández** (Switzerland) **M Hingis**	**6**	**6**

Semifinals
1	(Spain) **A Sánchez Vicario** (Netherlands) **B Schultz-McCarthy**	**7**	**6**
4	(Netherlands) K Boogert (Netherlands) M Oremans	5	3
3	(Spain) C Martínez (Argentina) P Tarabini	5	2
2	(United States) **G Fernández** (Switzerland) **M Hingis**	**7**	**6**

Final
1	(Spain) **Arantxa Sánchez Vicario** (Netherlands) **Brenda Schultz-McCarthy**	4	**7**	**6**
2	(United States) Gigi Fernández (Switzerland) Martina Hingis	**6**	6	4
