= 1994 Citizen Cup – Doubles =

Doubles
- 1994 Citizen Cup

Final
- Champions: (Czech Republic) Jana Novotná (Spain) Arantxa Sánchez Vicario
- Runners-up: (Russia) Eugenia Maniokova (Georgia (country)) Leila Meskhi
- Score: 6–3, 6–2

Details
- Draw: 16 (1WC/1Q)
- Seeds: 4

Events
Singles	Doubles
← 1993 ·	Hamburg European Open	· 1995 →

Steffi Graf and Rennae Stubbs were the two-time defending champions, but none competed this year. Graf opted to focus on the singles tournament, finishing as runner-up.

Jana Novotná and Arantxa Sánchez Vicario won the title by defeating Eugenia Maniokova and Leila Meskhi 6–3, 6–2 in the final.

== Seeds ==
1. (Czech Republic) Jana Novotná / (Spain) Arantxa Sánchez Vicario (champions)
2. (Argentina) Patricia Tarabini / (Netherlands) Caroline Vis (quarterfinals)
3. (Italy) Laura Golarsa / (Argentina) Mercedes Paz (semifinals)
4. (United States) Ann Grossman / (Germany) Barbara Rittner (first round)

== Draw ==
Key

- Q = Qualifier
- WC = Wild card
- LL = Lucky loser
- Alt = Alternate
- ITF = ITF entry
- PR = Protected ranking
- SR = Special ranking
- SE = Special exempt
- JE = Junior exempt
- JR = Junior Accelerator Programme entrant
- CO = College Accelerator Programme entrant
- NG = Next Gen Accelerator Program entrant
- w/o = Walkover
- r = Retired
- d = Defaulted

=== Draw ===
First round
1	(Czech Republic) J Novotná (Spain) A Sánchez Vicario	6	6
(Germany) W Probst (Germany) C Singer	0	2
(Poland) M Mróz (United Kingdom) C Wood	3	2
(Czech Republic) K Hrdličková (Netherlands) S Noorlander	6	6
3	(Italy) L Golarsa (Argentina) M Paz	6	3	6
(Kazakhstan) E Likhovtseva (Russia) E Makarova	3	6	1
(Germany) S Hack (Germany) C Schneider	6	4	2
(Ukraine) E Brioukhovets (Ukraine) N Medvedeva	3	6	6
(Germany) M Babel (Croatia) M Murić	7	5	6
(Argentina) B Fulco-Villella (Brazil) A Vieira	5	7	2
Q	(Ukraine) O Lugina (Bulgaria) E Wagner	7	6
4	(United States) A Grossman (Germany) B Rittner	5	0
(Italy) L Ferrando (Germany) K Kschwendt	4	0
(Russia) E Maniokova (Georgia (country)) L Meskhi	6	6
WC	(Germany) M Kochta (Germany) H Rusch	2	4
2	(Argentina) P Tarabini (Netherlands) C Vis	6	6

Quarterfinals
1	(Czech Republic) J Novotná (Spain) A Sánchez Vicario	6	6
(Czech Republic) K Hrdličková (Netherlands) S Noorlander	0	1
3	(Italy) L Golarsa (Argentina) M Paz	6	6
(Ukraine) E Brioukhovets (Ukraine) N Medvedeva	1	3
(Germany) M Babel (Croatia) M Murić	1	6^{3}
Q	(Ukraine) O Lugina (Bulgaria) E Wagner	6	7^{7}
(Russia) E Maniokova (Georgia (country)) L Meskhi	6	2	6
2	(Argentina) P Tarabini (Netherlands) C Vis	2	6	2

Semifinals
1	(Czech Republic) J Novotná (Spain) A Sánchez Vicario	6	6
3	(Italy) L Golarsa (Argentina) M Paz	4	4
Q	(Ukraine) O Lugina (Bulgaria) E Wagner	6	4	4
(Russia) E Maniokova (Georgia (country)) L Meskhi	3	6	6

Final
1	(Czech Republic) J Novotná (Spain) A Sánchez Vicario	6	6
(Russia) E Maniokova (Georgia (country)) L Meskhi	3	2
