= 1997 Rexona Cup =

- Date: 28 April – 4 May
- Edition: 13th
- Category: Tier II
- Draw: 28S /16D
- Prize money: $450,000
- Surface: Clay / outdoor
- Location: Hamburg, Germany
- Venue: Am Rothenbaum

Champions

Singles
- (Croatia) Iva Majoli

Doubles
- (Germany) Anke Huber / (France) Mary Pierce
← 1996 ·	WTA Hamburg	· 1998 →

The 1997 Rexona Cup was a women's tennis tournament played on outdoor clay courts at the Am Rothenbaum in Hamburg in Germany that was part of the Tier II category of the 1997 WTA Tour. It was the 13th edition of the tournament and was held from 28 April through 4 May 1997. Fourth-seeded Iva Majoli won the singles title.

== Finals ==
=== Singles ===
(Croatia) Iva Majoli defeated (Romania) Ruxandra Dragomir 6–3, 6–2

- It was Majoli's 2nd singles title of the year and the 6th of her career.

=== Doubles ===
(Germany) Anke Huber / (France) Mary Pierce defeated (Romania) Ruxandra Dragomir / (Croatia) Iva Majoli 2–6, 7–6, 6–2

- It was Huber's only doubles title of her career. It was Pierce's only doubles title of the year and the 3rd of her career.
