= 1998 Intersport Grand Prix =

- Date: 27 April – 3 May
- Edition: 14th
- Category: Tier II
- Draw: 28S / 16D
- Surface: Clay / outdoor
- Location: Hamburg, Germany
- Venue: Am Rothenbaum

Champions

Singles
- (Switzerland) Martina Hingis

Doubles
- (Austria) Barbara Schett / (Switzerland) Patty Schnyder
← 1997 ·	WTA Hamburg	· 1999 →

The 1998 Intersport Grand Prix was a women's tennis tournament played on outdoor clay courts at the Am Rothenbaum in Hamburg in Germany and was part of Tier II of the 1998 WTA Tour. The tournament ran from April 27 through May 3, 1998. Martina Hingis won the singles title.

== Finals ==
=== Singles ===
(Switzerland) Martina Hingis defeated (Czech Republic) Jana Novotná 6–3, 7–5

- It was Hingis' 7th title of the year and the 32nd of her career.

=== Doubles ===
(Austria) Barbara Schett / (Switzerland) Patty Schnyder defeated (Switzerland) Martina Hingis / (Czech Republic) Jana Novotná 7–6^{(7–3)}, 3–6, 6–3

- It was Schett's only title of the year and the 5th of her career. It was Schnyder's 3rd title of the year and the 3rd of her career.
