= 1998 Intersport Grand Prix – Doubles =

Doubles
- 1998 Intersport Grand Prix
- 1997 Champions: (Germany) Anke Huber (France) Mary Pierce

Final
- Champions: (Austria) Barbara Schett (Switzerland) Patty Schnyder
- Runners-up: (Switzerland) Martina Hingis (Czech Republic) Jana Novotná
- Score: 7–6^{(7–3)}, 3–6, 6–3

Details
- Draw: 16
- Seeds: 4

Events
Singles	Doubles
← 1997 ·	Hamburg European Open	· 1999 →

Anke Huber and Mary Pierce were the defending champions but did not compete that year.

Barbara Schett and Patty Schnyder won in the final 7–6^{(7–3)}, 3–6, 6–3 against Martina Hingis and Jana Novotná.

== Seeds ==
Champion seeds are indicated in bold text while text in italics indicates the round in which those seeds were eliminated.

1. (Switzerland) Martina Hingis / (Czech Republic) Jana Novotná (final)
2. (Spain) Arantxa Sánchez-Vicario / (Argentina) Patricia Tarabini (semifinals)
3. (Romania) Ruxandra Dragomir / (Croatia) Iva Majoli (semifinals)
4. (Austria) **Barbara Schett** / (Switzerland) **Patty Schnyder (champions)**

== Draw ==
Key

- Q = Qualifier
- WC = Wild card
- LL = Lucky loser
- Alt = Alternate
- ITF = ITF entry
- PR = Protected ranking
- SR = Special ranking
- SE = Special exempt
- JE = Junior exempt
- JR = Junior Accelerator Programme entrant
- CO = College Accelerator Programme entrant
- NG = Next Gen Accelerator Program entrant
- w/o = Walkover
- r = Retired
- d = Defaulted

First round
1	(Switzerland) **M Hingis** (Czech Republic) **J Novotná**	**6**	**6**
(Czech Republic) R Bobková (Germany) C Schneider	1	3
(France) C Dhenin (Czech Republic) P Langrová	4	1
Q	(Germany) **K Freye** (Bulgaria) **P Stoyanova**	**6**	**6**
3	(Romania) **R Dragomir** (Croatia) **I Majoli**	3	**6**	**6**
(Poland) A Olsza (France) A-G Sidot	**6**	3	4
(Romania) **C Cristea** (Spain) **V Ruano Pascual**	**6**	**7**
(Slovakia) K Habšudová (Argentina) F Labat	4	5
(Netherlands) **S Noorlander** (France) **N van Lottum**	3	**6**	**6**
(Belgium) L Courtois (Canada) P Hy-Boulais	**6**	4	4
(Czech Republic) H Vildová (United Kingdom) L Woodroffe	2	4
4	(Austria) **B Schett** (Switzerland) **P Schnyder**	**6**	**6**
(Ukraine) O Lugina (Ukraine) E Tatarkova	3	**6**	3
(Bulgaria) **S Krivencheva** (Czech Republic) **E Melicharová**	**6**	3	**6**
WC	(Germany) S Klösel (Germany) J Wöhr	1	6^{1}
2	(Spain) **A Sánchez-Vicario** (Argentina) **P Tarabini**	**6**	**7^{7}**

Quarterfinals
1	(Switzerland) **M Hingis** (Czech Republic) **J Novotná**	**6**	**6**
Q	(Germany) K Freye (Bulgaria) P Stoyanova	1	2
3	(Romania) **R Dragomir** (Croatia) **I Majoli**	**6**	5	**7**
(Romania) C Cristea (Spain) V Ruano Pascual	2	**7**	5
(Netherlands) S Noorlander (France) N van Lottum	3	2
4	(Austria) **B Schett** (Switzerland) **P Schnyder**	**6**	**6**
(Bulgaria) S Krivencheva (Czech Republic) E Melicharová	4	3
2	(Spain) **A Sánchez-Vicario** (Argentina) **P Tarabini**	**6**	**6**

Semifinals
1	(Switzerland) **M Hingis** (Czech Republic) **J Novotná**	**7**	**6**
3	(Romania) R Dragomir (Croatia) I Majoli	5	1
4	(Austria) **B Schett** (Switzerland) **P Schnyder**	**7^{7}**	**6**
2	(Spain) A Sánchez-Vicario (Argentina) P Tarabini	6^{5}	2

Final
1	(Switzerland) Martina Hingis (Czech Republic) Jana Novotná	6^{3}	**6**	3
4	(Austria) **Barbara Schett** (Switzerland) **Patty Schnyder**	**7^{7}**	3	**6**
