= 1994 Citizen Cup =

- Date: 25 April – 1 May
- Edition: 8th
- Category: Tier II tournament
- Draw: 32S / 16D
- Prize money: $400,000
- Surface: Clay / outdoor
- Location: Hamburg, Germany
- Venue: Am Rothenbaum

Champions

Singles
- (Spain) Arantxa Sánchez Vicario

Doubles
- (Czech Republic) Jana Novotná / (Spain) Arantxa Sánchez Vicario
← 1993 ·	WTA Hamburg	· 1995 →

The 1994 Citizen Cup was a women's tennis tournament played on outdoor clay courts. It was the eighth edition of the Citizen Cup and was a Tier II tournament on the 1994 WTA Tour. The tournament, consisting of a singles and doubles competition, took place from 25 April through 1 May 1994 at the Am Rothenbaum venue in Hamburg, Germany. Second-seeded Arantxa Sánchez Vicario won the singles title and $80,000 first-prize money.

== Entrants ==
=== Seeds ===
Country	Player	Seeding
GER	Steffi Graf	1
ESP	Arantxa Sánchez Vicario	2
CZE	Jana Novotná	3
GER	Anke Huber	4
BUL	Magdalena Maleeva	5
GER	Sabine Hack	6
UKR	Natalia Medvedeva	7
BUL	Katerina Maleeva	8

== Champions ==
=== Singles ===
(Spain) Arantxa Sánchez Vicario defeated (Germany) Steffi Graf 4–6, 7–6^{(7–3)}, 7–6^{(8–6)}

- It was Sánchez Vicario's third title of the year, and the 15th of her career.

=== Doubles ===
(Czech Republic) Jana Novotná / (Spain) Arantxa Sánchez Vicario defeated (Russia) Eugenia Maniokova / (Georgia (country)) Leila Meskhi, 6–3, 6–2
