= 1999 Betty Barclay Cup – Doubles =

Doubles
- 1999 Betty Barclay Cup

Final
- Champions: (Latvia) Larisa Neiland (Spain) Arantxa Sánchez Vicario
- Runners-up: (South Africa) Amanda Coetzer (Czech Republic) Jana Novotná
- Score: 6–2, 6–1

Details
- Draw: 16
- Seeds: 4

Events
Singles	Doubles
← 1998 ·	Hamburg European Open	· 2000 →

The 1999 Betty Barclay Cup doubles was the doubles event of the fifteenth edition of the Betty Barclay Cup, a WTA Tier II tournament held in Hamburg, Germany and part of the European claycourt season. Barbara Schett and Patty Schnyder were the defending champions but only Schett competed that year with Ruxandra Dragomir. The pair lost in the first round to Irina Spîrlea and Caroline Vis.

Second seeds Larisa Neiland and Arantxa Sánchez Vicario won in the final 6–2, 6–1 against Amanda Coetzer and Jana Novotná.

== Seeds ==
1. (France) Alexandra Fusai / (France) Nathalie Tauziat (semifinals)
2. (Latvia) Larisa Neiland / (Spain) Arantxa Sánchez Vicario (champions)
3. (Romania) Irina Spîrlea / (Netherlands) Caroline Vis (semifinals)
4. (South Africa) Amanda Coetzer / (Czech Republic) Jana Novotná (final)

== Draw ==
Key

- Q = Qualifier
- WC = Wild card
- LL = Lucky loser
- Alt = Alternate
- ITF = ITF entry
- PR = Protected ranking
- SR = Special ranking
- SE = Special exempt
- JE = Junior exempt
- JR = Junior Accelerator Programme entrant
- CO = College Accelerator Programme entrant
- NG = Next Gen Accelerator Program entrant
- w/o = Walkover
- r = Retired
- d = Defaulted

First round
1	(France) A Fusai (France) N Tauziat	6	6
Q	(Federal Republic of Yugoslavia) S Naćuk (Austria) S Plischke	3	1
(South Africa) M de Swardt (South Africa) L Horn	6	6
(France) A-G Sidot (Germany) E Wagner	1	2
4	(South Africa) A Coetzer (Czech Republic) J Novotná	6	7^{7}
(France) M Pierce (Argentina) P Tarabini	4	6^{1}
(Poland) A Olsza (Bulgaria) P Stoyanova	1	3
(Argentina) L Montalvo (Spain) V Ruano Pascual	6	6
(Czech Republic) K Hrdličková (Germany) B Rittner	6	7^{7}
(Spain) E Bes Ostariz (Germany) K Freye	4	6^{5}
(Romania) R Dragomir (Austria) B Schett	1	2
3	(Romania) I Spîrlea (Netherlands) C Vis	6	6
(France) C Dhenin (Netherlands) S Noorlander	3	1
(Ukraine) O Lugina (Czech Republic) E Melicharová	6	6
WC	(Germany) J Abe (Germany) J Kandarr	3	6	1
2	(Latvia) L Neiland (Spain) A Sánchez Vicario	6	4	6

Quarterfinals
1	(France) A Fusai (France) N Tauziat	2	6	6
(South Africa) M de Swardt (South Africa) L Horn	6	3	2
4	(South Africa) A Coetzer (Czech Republic) J Novotná	3	7^{7}	7
(Argentina) L Montalvo (Spain) V Ruano Pascual	6	6^{3}	5
(Czech Republic) K Hrdličková (Germany) B Rittner
3	(Romania) I Spîrlea (Netherlands) C Vis	w/o
(Ukraine) O Lugina (Czech Republic) E Melicharová	3	3
2	(Latvia) L Neiland (Spain) A Sánchez Vicario	6	6

Semifinals
1	(France) A Fusai (France) N Tauziat	4	1
4	(South Africa) A Coetzer (Czech Republic) J Novotná	6	6
3	(Romania) I Spîrlea (Netherlands) C Vis	2	6	3
2	(Latvia) L Neiland (Spain) A Sánchez Vicario	6	3	6

Final
4	(South Africa) A Coetzer (Czech Republic) J Novotná	2	1
2	(Latvia) L Neiland (Spain) A Sánchez Vicario	6	6

== Qualifying ==
=== Seeds ===
1. (Austria) Patricia Wartusch / (Germany) Jasmin Wöhr (second round)
2. (Federal Republic of Yugoslavia) Sandra Naćuk / (Austria) Sylvia Plischke (Qualifiers)

=== Qualifiers ===
1. (Federal Republic of Yugoslavia) Sandra Načuk / (Austria) Sylvia Plischke

== Qualifying draw ==
Key

- Q = Qualifier
- WC = Wild card
- LL = Lucky loser
- Alt = Alternate
- ITF = ITF entry
- PR = Protected ranking
- SR = Special ranking
- SE = Special exempt
- JE = Junior exempt
- JR = Junior Accelerator Programme entrant
- CO = College Accelerator Programme entrant
- NG = Next Gen Accelerator Program entrant
- w/o = Walkover
- r = Retired
- d = Defaulted

First round
1	(Austria) Patricia Wartusch (Germany) Jasmin Wöhr
Bye
(Germany) Angelika Bachmann (Germany) Lydia Steinbach
Bye
(Germany) Anca Barna (Austria) Marion Maruska
(Bulgaria) Lubomira Bacheva (Germany) Vanessa Henke	w/o
Bye
2	(Federal Republic of Yugoslavia) Sandra Naćuk (Austria) Sylvia Plischke

Second round
1	(Austria) Patricia Wartusch (Germany) Jasmin Wöhr	7
(Germany) Angelika Bachmann (Germany) Lydia Steinbach	9
(Bulgaria) Lubomira Bacheva (Germany) Vanessa Henke	3
2	(Federal Republic of Yugoslavia) Sandra Naćuk (Austria) Sylvia Plischke	8

Qualifying competition
(Germany) Angelika Bachmann (Germany) Lydia Steinbach	5
2	(Federal Republic of Yugoslavia) Sandra Naćuk (Austria) Sylvia Plischke	8
