= 1999 Sanex Trophy – Doubles =

Doubles
- 1999 Sanex Trophy

Final
- Champions: (Czech Republic) Eva Martincová (Germany) Elena Wagner
- Runners-up: (Russia) Evgenia Koulikovskaya (Federal Republic of Yugoslavia) Sandra Naćuk
- Score: 3–6, 6–3, 6–3

Details
- Draw: 16
- Seeds: 4

Events
Singles	Doubles
- Sanex Trophy

The 1999 Sanex Trophy doubles was the doubles event of the first edition of the Sanex Trophy; A WTA Tier IV tournament and one of the most prestigious women's tennis tournaments held in Belgium.

Eva Martincová and Elena Wagner won the title, which was Martincová's first and only doubles title, and Wagner's third doubles title.

== Seeds ==
1. (Belgium) Sabine Appelmans / (Belgium) Laurence Courtois (quarterfinals)
2. (Sweden) Åsa Carlsson / (Netherlands) Seda Noorlander (first round)
3. (Slovakia) Karina Habšudová / (Germany) Barbara Rittner (quarterfinals)
4. (Spain) Alicia Ortuño / (Spain) Cristina Torrens Valero (first round)

== Draw ==
Key

- Q = Qualifier
- WC = Wild card
- LL = Lucky loser
- Alt = Alternate
- ITF = ITF entry
- PR = Protected ranking
- SR = Special ranking
- SE = Special exempt
- JE = Junior exempt
- JR = Junior Accelerator Programme entrant
- CO = College Accelerator Programme entrant
- NG = Next Gen Accelerator Program entrant
- w/o = Walkover
- r = Retired
- d = Defaulted

First round
1	(Belgium) S Appelmans (Belgium) L Courtois	3	7	7
(Bulgaria) L Bacheva (Hungary) R Kuti-Kis	6	5	5
Q	(United Kingdom) H Collin (Spain) M Marrero	1	5
(Czech Republic) E Martincová (Germany) E Wagner	6	7
4	(Spain) A Ortuño (Spain) C Torrens Valero	1	3
(France) C Dhenin (Czech Republic) E Melicharová	6	6
(Hungary) K Marosi (Germany) C Singer	1	6	6
WC	(Belgium) K Clijsters (Belgium) J Henin	6	2	2
(Belarus) O Barabanschikova (France) É Loit	6	6
(Germany) K Freye (Romania) A Vanc	1	2
Q	(Germany) P Begerow (Italy) A Serra Zanetti	1	6^{5}
3	(Slovakia) K Habšudová (Germany) B Rittner	6	7^{7}
(France) A Cocheteux (Russia) N Petrova	2	2
(Spain) M Ramon Climent (Spain) G Riera	6	6
(Russia) E Koulikovskaya (Federal Republic of Yugoslavia) S Naćuk	1	6	6
2	(Sweden) Å Carlsson (Netherlands) S Noorlander	6	2	3

Quarterfinals
1	(Belgium) S Appelmans (Belgium) L Courtois	1	1
(Czech Republic) E Martincová (Germany) E Wagner	6	6
(France) C Dhenin (Czech Republic) E Melicharová	5	4
(Hungary) K Marosi (Germany) C Singer	7	6
(Belarus) O Barabanschikova (France) É Loit	6	7^{8}
3	(Slovakia) K Habšudová (Germany) B Rittner	2	6^{6}
(Spain) M Ramon Climent (Spain) G Riera	2	2
(Russia) E Koulikovskaya (Federal Republic of Yugoslavia) S Naćuk	6	6

Semifinals
(Czech Republic) E Martincová (Germany) E Wagner	6	6
(Hungary) K Marosi (Germany) C Singer	1	3
(Belarus) O Barabanschikova (France) É Loit	4	2
(Russia) E Koulikovskaya (Federal Republic of Yugoslavia) S Naćuk	6	6

Final
(Czech Republic) E Martincová (Germany) E Wagner	3	6	6
(Russia) E Koulikovskaya (Federal Republic of Yugoslavia) S Naćuk	6	3	3

== Qualifying ==
=== Seeds ===
1. (Italy) Giulia Casoni / (Italy) Maria Paola Zavagli (first round)
2. (Spain) Conchita Martínez Granados / (Spain) María Sánchez Lorenzo (first round)

=== Qualifiers ===
1. (Germany) Petra Begerow / (Italy) Antonella Serra Zanetti
2. (United Kingdom) Hannah Collin / (Spain) Marta Marrero

== Qualifying draw ==
Key

- Q = Qualifier
- WC = Wild card
- LL = Lucky loser
- Alt = Alternate
- ITF = ITF entry
- PR = Protected ranking
- SR = Special ranking
- SE = Special exempt
- JE = Junior exempt
- JR = Junior Accelerator Programme entrant
- CO = College Accelerator Programme entrant
- NG = Next Gen Accelerator Program entrant
- w/o = Walkover
- r = Retired
- d = Defaulted

=== First qualifier ===
First round
1	(Italy) Giulia Casoni (Italy) Maria Paola Zavagli	3
(Germany) Petra Begerow (Italy) Antonella Serra Zanetti	8
(Russia) Anastasia Myskina (Italy) Francesca Schiavone	7
(Czech Republic) Sandra Kleinová (South Africa) Joannette Kruger	9

Qualifying competition
(Germany) Petra Begerow (Italy) Antonella Serra Zanetti	8
(Czech Republic) Sandra Kleinová (South Africa) Joannette Kruger	5

=== Second qualifier ===
First round
(Germany) Nina Nittinger (Belgium) Cindy Schuurmans	3
(Australia) Mireille Dittmann (Australia) Natalie Dittmann	8
WC	(United Kingdom) Hannah Collin (Spain) Marta Marrero	9
2	(Spain) Conchita Martínez Granados (Spain) María Sánchez Lorenzo	7

Qualifying competition
(Australia) Mireille Dittmann (Australia) Natalie Dittmann	5
WC	(United Kingdom) Hannah Collin (Spain) Marta Marrero	8
