= 1995 Citizen Cup – Singles =

Singles
- 1995 Citizen Cup

Final
- Champion: (Spain) Conchita Martínez
- Runner-up: (Switzerland) Martina Hingis
- Score: 6–1, 6–0

Details
- Draw: 28 (4 Q / 2 WC )
- Seeds: 8

Events
Singles	Doubles
← 1994 ·	WTA Hamburg	· 1996 →

The 1995 Citizen Cup singles was a tennis event played on outdoor clay courts at the Am Rothenbaum in Hamburg in Germany that was part of Tier II of the 1995 WTA Tour. The 1995 Citizen Cup tournament was held from 1 May until 7 May 1995.

Arantxa Sánchez Vicario was the defending champion but did not compete that year. Conchita Martínez won in the final 6–1, 6–0 against Martina Hingis.

== Seeds ==
A champion seed is indicated in bold text while text in italics indicates the round in which that seed was eliminated. The top four seeds received a bye to the second round.

1. (France) Mary Pierce (second round)
2. (Spain) **Conchita Martínez (champion)**
3. (Czech Republic) Jana Novotná (second round)
4. (Bulgaria) Magdalena Maleeva (semifinals)
5. (Germany) Anke Huber (semifinals)
6. (Netherlands) Brenda Schultz (second round)
7. (Austria) Judith Wiesner (quarterfinals)
8. (Germany) Barbara Rittner (quarterfinals)

== Draw ==
Key

- Q = Qualifier
- WC = Wild card
- LL = Lucky loser
- Alt = Alternate
- ITF = ITF entry
- PR = Protected ranking
- SR = Special ranking
- SE = Special exempt
- JE = Junior exempt
- JR = Junior Accelerator Programme entrant
- CO = College Accelerator Programme entrant
- NG = Next Gen Accelerator Program entrant
- w/o = Walkover
- r = Retired
- d = Defaulted

=== Final ===
Final
	(Switzerland) Martina Hingis	1	0
2	(Spain) **Conchita Martínez**	**6**	**6**

=== Section 1 ===
First round
Q	(Finland) N Dahlman	5	3
WC	(Germany) **P Begerow**	**7**	**6**
(Russia) E Makarova	1	**7**	3
(United States) **A Grossman**	**6**	6	**6**
(Bulgaria) K Maleeva	1	0
5	(Germany) **A Huber**	**6**	**6**
(Switzerland) **M Hingis**	**6**	**6**
(France) S Testud	1	2
WC	(Germany) **W Probst**	**6**	**6**
Q	(Madagascar) D Randriantefy	4	2
LL	(Croatia) N Ercegović	3	**6**	0
7	(Austria) **J Wiesner**	**6**	3	**6**

Second round
1	(France) M Pierce	**6**	5	0/r
WC	(Germany) **P Begerow**	3	**7**	**3**
(United States) A Grossman	3	1
5	(Germany) **A Huber**	**6**	**6**
3	(Czech Republic) J Novotná	1	**6**	2
(Switzerland) **M Hingis**	**6**	2	**6**
WC	(Germany) W Probst	1	4
7	(Austria) **J Wiesner**	**6**	**6**

Quarterfinals
WC	(Germany) P Begerow	**6**	4	2
5	(Germany) **A Huber**	3	**6**	**6**
(Switzerland) **M Hingis**	**7**	**6**
7	(Austria) J Wiesner	6	1

Semifinals
5	(Germany) A Huber	2	**6**	3
(Switzerland) **M Hingis**	**6**	1	**6**

=== Section 2 ===
First round
8	(Germany) **B Rittner**	3	**7**	**6**
(Bulgaria) E Pampoulova	**6**	6	1
(United States) M McGrath	4	6
(Mexico) **A Gavaldón**	**6**	**7**
(Germany) C Singer	0	2
(France) **A Dechaume-Balleret**	**6**	**6**
6	(Netherlands) **B Schultz**	**6**	**6**
Q	(Russia) E Maniokova	1	3
Q	(Germany) **J Kandarr**	**6**	**6**
(Germany) S Frankl	1	2
(Slovakia) **R Zrubáková**	**6**	**6**
LL	(France) C Dhenin	4	2

Second round
8	(Germany) **B Rittner**	**6**	**6**
(Mexico) A Gavaldón	4	0
(France) A Dechaume-Balleret	3	3
4	(Bulgaria) **M Maleeva**	**6**	**6**
6	(Netherlands) B Schultz	3	6
Q	(Germany) **J Kandarr**	**6**	**7**
(Slovakia) R Zrubáková	1	4
2	(Spain) **C Martínez**	**6**	**6**

Quarterfinals
8	(Germany) B Rittner	0	**7**	6
4	(Bulgaria) **M Maleeva**	**6**	6	**7**
Q	(Germany) J Kandarr	1	0
2	(Spain) **C Martínez**	**6**	**6**

Semifinals
4	(Bulgaria) M Maleeva	0	0
2	(Spain) **C Martínez**	**6**	**6**
