= 1998 Intersport Grand Prix – Singles =

Singles
- 1998 Intersport Grand Prix

Final
- Champion: (Switzerland) Martina Hingis
- Runner-up: (Czech Republic) Jana Novotná
- Score: 6–3, 7–5

Details
- Draw: 28 (4 Q / 3 WC )
- Seeds: 8

Events
Singles	Doubles
← 1997 ·	WTA Hamburg	· 1999 →

Iva Majoli was the defending champion but lost in the second round to Barbara Schett.

Martina Hingis won in the final 6–3, 7–5 against Jana Novotná.

== Seeds ==
A champion seed is indicated in bold text while text in italics indicates the round in which that seed was eliminated. The top four seeds received a bye to the second round.

1. (Switzerland) **Martina Hingis (champion)**
2. (Czech Republic) Jana Novotná (final)
3. (Spain) Arantxa Sánchez-Vicario (quarterfinals)
4. (Croatia) Iva Majoli (second round)
5. (Switzerland) Patty Schnyder (semifinals)
6. (Belgium) Sabine Appelmans (first round)
7. (Romania) Ruxandra Dragomir (first round)
8. (Austria) Barbara Paulus (first round)

== Draw ==
Key

- Q = Qualifier
- WC = Wild card
- LL = Lucky loser
- Alt = Alternate
- ITF = ITF entry
- PR = Protected ranking
- SR = Special ranking
- SE = Special exempt
- JE = Junior exempt
- JR = Junior Accelerator Programme entrant
- CO = College Accelerator Programme entrant
- NG = Next Gen Accelerator Program entrant
- w/o = Walkover
- r = Retired
- d = Defaulted

=== Final ===
Final
1	(Switzerland) **Martina Hingis**	**6**	**7**
2	(Czech Republic) Jana Novotná	3	5

=== Section 1 ===
First round
WC	(Germany) W Probst	4	0
(France) **J Halard-Decugis**	**6**	**6**
WC	(United States) **J Capriati**	**6**	**6**
(Argentina) F Labat	2	4
Q	(Netherlands) **S Noorlander**	**6**	**6**
7	(Romania) R Dragomir	2	2
(Austria) **B Schett**	**6**	**6**
(Germany) M Babel	4	4
Q	(Czech Republic) R Bobková	3	1
(Spain) **V Ruano Pascual**	**6**	**6**
(Russia) **E Likhovtseva**	**6**	3	**6**
6	(Belgium) S Appelmans	0	**6**	0

Second round
1	(Switzerland) **M Hingis**	**7**	**6**
(France) J Halard-Decugis	5	1
WC	(United States) **J Capriati**	**6**	**6**
Q	(Netherlands) S Noorlander	3	2
4	(Croatia) I Majoli	5	2
(Austria) **B Schett**	**7**	**6**
(Spain) **V Ruano Pascual**	**6**	**6**
(Russia) E Likhovtseva	0	4

Quarterfinals
1	(Switzerland) **M Hingis**	**6**	**6**
WC	(United States) J Capriati	1	3
(Austria) **B Schett**	**6**	**6**
(Spain) V Ruano Pascual	0	0

Semifinals
1	(Switzerland) **M Hingis**	**6**	**6**
(Austria) B Schett	2	2

=== Section 2 ===
First round
5	(Switzerland) **P Schnyder**	**6**	**6**
Q	(Italy) F Perfetti	1	0
(France) **A-G Sidot**	**6**	**6**
(Slovakia) K Habšudová	3	3
(France) S Pitkowski	1	**7**	3
(Slovakia) **H Nagyová**	**6**	5	**6**
8	(Austria) B Paulus	**7**	4	2
(France) **A Fusai**	6	**6**	**6**
(Canada) P Hy-Boulais	1	3
Q	(Germany) **J Abe**	**6**	**6**
(Spain) **M Serna**	**7**	**6**
WC	(Germany) S Klösel	6	0

Second round
5	(Switzerland) **P Schnyder**	3	**6**	**6**
(France) A-G Sidot	**6**	3	4
(Slovakia) H Nagyová	4	4
3	(Spain) **A Sánchez-Vicario**	**6**	**6**
(France) A Fusai	2	4
Q	(Germany) **J Abe**	**6**	**6**
(Spain) M Serna	4	2
2	(Czech Republic) **J Novotná**	**6**	**6**

Quarterfinals
5	(Switzerland) **P Schnyder**	**6**	**6**
3	(Spain) A Sánchez-Vicario	3	0
Q	(Germany) J Abe	1	3
2	(Czech Republic) **J Novotná**	**6**	**6**

Semifinals
5	(Switzerland) P Schnyder	**6**	5	3
2	(Czech Republic) **J Novotná**	2	**7**	**6**
