= 1993 Citizen Cup – Doubles =

Doubles
- 1993 Citizen Cup

Final
- Champions: (Germany) Steffi Graf (Australia) Rennae Stubbs
- Runners-up: (Latvia) Larisa Neiland (Czech Republic) Jana Novotná
- Score: 6–4, 7–6^{(7–5)}

Details
- Draw: 16
- Seeds: 4

Events
Singles	Doubles
← 1992 ·	Hamburg European Open	· 1994 →

Steffi Graf and Rennae Stubbs were the defending champions, and they successfully defended their title by defeating Larisa Neiland and Jana Novotná in the final, 6–4, 7–6^{(7–5)}.

== Seeds ==
1. (Latvia) Larisa Neiland / (Czech Republic) Jana Novotná (final)
2. (Germany) Steffi Graf / (Australia) Rennae Stubbs (champions)
3. (Spain) Arantxa Sánchez Vicario / (Argentina) Patricia Tarabini (quarterfinals)
4. (Russia) Eugenia Maniokova / (Georgia (country)) Leila Meskhi (first round)

== Draw ==
Key

- Q = Qualifier
- WC = Wild card
- LL = Lucky loser
- Alt = Alternate
- ITF = ITF entry
- PR = Protected ranking
- SR = Special ranking
- SE = Special exempt
- JE = Junior exempt
- JR = Junior Accelerator Programme entrant
- CO = College Accelerator Programme entrant
- NG = Next Gen Accelerator Program entrant
- w/o = Walkover
- r = Retired
- d = Defaulted

=== Draw ===
First round
1	(Latvia) L Neiland (Czech Republic) J Novotná	w/o
(Bulgaria) M Maleeva (Switzerland) M Maleeva-Fragniere
(Netherlands) I Driehuis (Germany) C Singer	3	4
(Bulgaria) K Maleeva (Germany) B Rittner	6	6
4	(Russia) E Maniokova (Georgia (country)) L Meskhi	3	0
(Germany) A Huber (Austria) J Wiesner	6	6
WC	(Germany) E Pfaff (Germany) C Schneider	6	6
(Argentina) B Fulco (France) N van Lottum	0	3
(Ukraine) E Brioukhovets (Germany) K Kschwendt	3	6	3
(Sweden) M Lindström (Sweden) M Strandlund	6	3	6
(Bulgaria) E Pampoulova (Poland) K Teodorowicz	2	4
3	(Spain) A Sánchez Vicario (Argentina) P Tarabini	6	6
(Germany) M Babel (Germany) W Probst	6	7^{7}
(United Kingdom) J Durie (Ukraine) N Medvedeva	4	6^{3}
Q	(Israel) N Barkan (Ukraine) O Lugina	2	2
2	(Germany) S Graf (Australia) R Stubbs	6	6

Quarterfinals
1	(Latvia) L Neiland (Czech Republic) J Novotná	w/o
(Bulgaria) K Maleeva (Germany) B Rittner
(Germany) A Huber (Austria) J Wiesner	6	6
WC	(Germany) E Pfaff (Germany) C Schneider	1	3
(Sweden) M Lindström (Sweden) M Strandlund	2	6	6
3	(Spain) A Sánchez Vicario (Argentina) P Tarabini	6	0	3
(Germany) M Babel (Germany) W Probst	1	4
2	(Germany) S Graf (Australia) R Stubbs	6	6

Semifinals
1	(Latvia) L Neiland (Czech Republic) J Novotná	6	6
(Germany) A Huber (Austria) J Wiesner	2	2
(Sweden) M Lindström (Sweden) M Strandlund	3	2
2	(Germany) S Graf (Australia) R Stubbs	6	6

Final
1	(Latvia) L Neiland (Czech Republic) J Novotná	4	6^{5}
2	(Germany) S Graf (Australia) R Stubbs	6	7^{7}
