= List of WTA number 1 ranked singles tennis players =

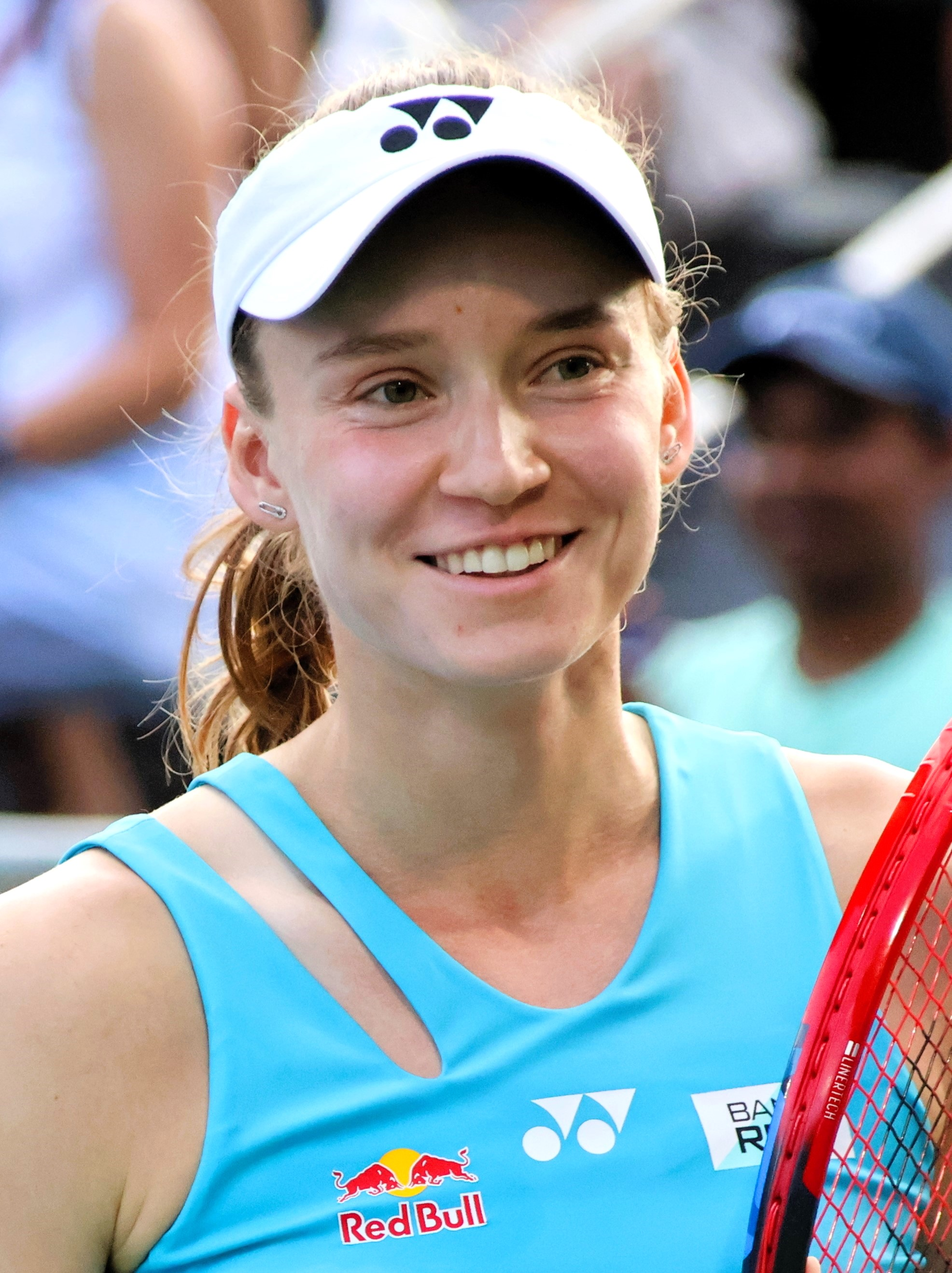
Elena Rybakina, currently ranked No. 1 in women's singles

The WTA rankings are the Women's Tennis Association's (WTA) merit-based system for determining the rankings in women's tennis. The top-ranked singles player is the player who, over the previous 52 weeks, has garnered the most ranking points on the WTA Tour. Points are awarded based on how far a player advances in tournaments and the category of those tournaments. The WTA has used a computerized system for determining the rankings since November 3, 1975. Since 1975, 30 women have been ranked No. 1 in singles by the WTA, of which 16 have been year-end No. 1.

Elena Rybakina is the current singles world No. 1.

== WTA No. 1 ranked singles players ==
The rankings are sourced by the WTA Media Guide and the WTA website (which usually revises its rankings every Sunday night or Monday morning, except when tournament finals are postponed).

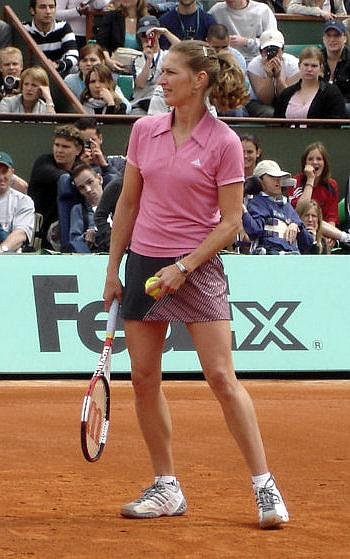
Steffi Graf spent 377 weeks at the top of the WTA ranking, the most of any female player.

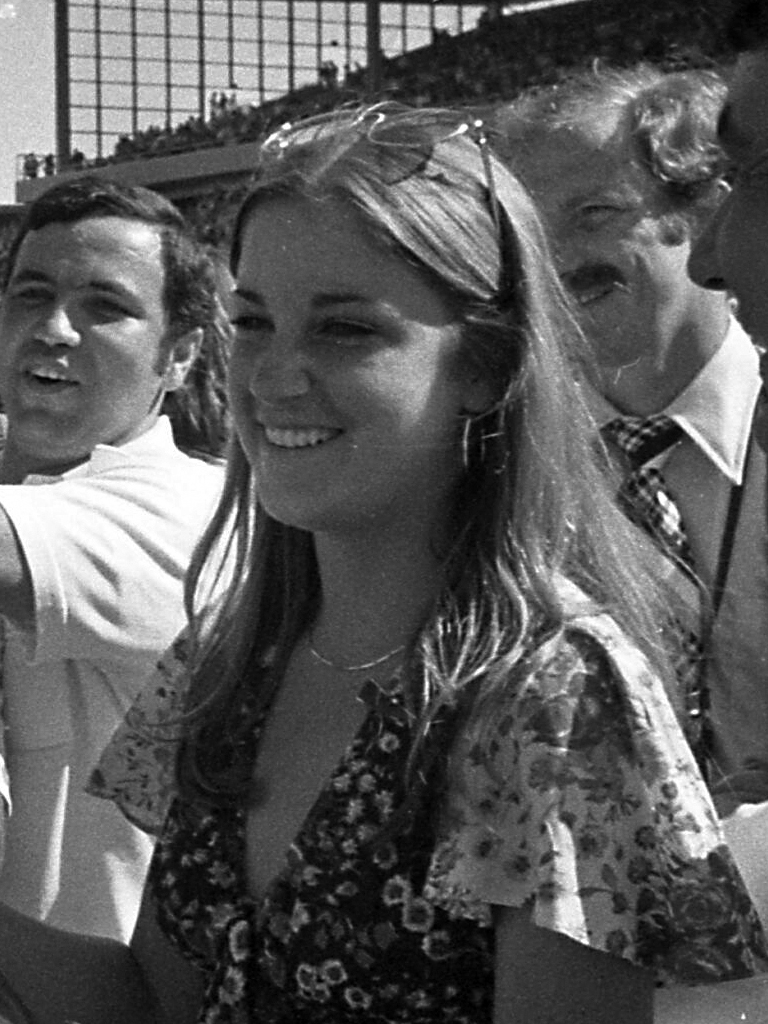
Chris Evert, the first player in history to be the singles number one at the WTA ranking.

First-time No. 1 player. (in bold)
‡ WTA rankings record.
* Current world No. 1 (weeks are automatically updated).

No.	Player	Start date	End date	Weeks	Total
1	**Chris Evert** (USA)	Nov 3, 1975	Apr 25, 1976	25	25
2	**Evonne Goolagong Cawley** (AUS)	Apr 26, 1976	May 9, 1976	2	**2**
	(United States) Chris Evert (2)	May 10, 1976	Jul 9, 1978	113	138
3	**Martina Navratilova** (USA)	Jul 10, 1978	Jan 13, 1979	26	26
	(United States) Chris Evert (3)	Jan 14, 1979	Jan 27, 1979	2	140
	(United States) Martina Navratilova (2)	Jan 28, 1979	Feb 24, 1979	4	30
	(United States) Chris Evert (4)	Feb 25, 1979	Apr 15, 1979	7	147
	(United States) Martina Navratilova (3)	Apr 16, 1979	Jun 24, 1979	10	40
	(United States) Chris Evert (5)	Jun 25, 1979	Sep 9, 1979	11	158
	(United States) Martina Navratilova (4)	Sep 10, 1979	Apr 6, 1980	31	71
4	**Tracy Austin** (USA)	Apr 7, 1980	Apr 20, 1980	2	2
	(United States) Martina Navratilova (5)	Apr 21, 1980	Jul 6, 1980	11	82
	(United States) Tracy Austin (2)	Jul 7, 1980	Nov 17, 1980	19	**21**
	(United States) Chris Evert (6)	Nov 18, 1980	May 2, 1982	76	234
	(United States) Martina Navratilova (6)	May 3, 1982	May 16, 1982	2	84
	(United States) Chris Evert (7)	May 17, 1982	Jun 13, 1982	4	238
	(United States) Martina Navratilova (7)	Jun 14, 1982	Jun 9, 1985	156	240
	(United States) Chris Evert (8)	Jun 10, 1985	Oct 13, 1985	18	256
	(United States) Martina Navratilova (8)	Oct 14, 1985	Oct 27, 1985	2	242
	(United States) Chris Evert (9)	Oct 28, 1985	Nov 24, 1985	4	**260**
	(United States) Martina Navratilova (9)	Nov 25, 1985	Aug 16, 1987	90	**332**
5	**Steffi Graf** (FRG)	Aug 17, 1987	Mar 10, 1991	**186**^{‡}	186
6	**Monica Seles** (YUG)	Mar 11, 1991	Aug 4, 1991	21	21
	(Germany) Steffi Graf (2)	Aug 5, 1991	Aug 11, 1991	1	187
	(Socialist Federal Republic of Yugoslavia) Monica Seles (2)	Aug 12, 1991	Aug 18, 1991	1	22
	(Germany) Steffi Graf (3)	Aug 19, 1991	Sep 8, 1991	3	190
	(Socialist Federal Republic of Yugoslavia) / (Federal Republic of Yugoslavia) Monica Seles (Note: Monica Seles was stabbed by a spectator during a WTA tournament match on 30 April 1993; while ranked number one. When she returned to competition in 1995, the WTA decided to reinstate her alongside Graf as number one, with her ranking protected for a year until she had a full season of ranking points accrued.) (3)	Sep 9, 1991	Jun 6, 1993	91	113
	(Germany) Steffi Graf (4)	Jun 7, 1993	Feb 5, 1995	87	277
7	**Arantxa Sánchez Vicario** (ESP)	Feb 6, 1995	Feb 19, 1995	2	2
	(Germany) Steffi Graf (5)	Feb 20, 1995	Feb 26, 1995	1	278
	(Spain) Arantxa Sánchez Vicario (2)	Feb 27, 1995	Apr 9, 1995	6	8
	(Germany) Steffi Graf (6)	Apr 10, 1995	May 14, 1995	5	283
	(Spain) Arantxa Sánchez Vicario (3)	May 15, 1995	Jun 11, 1995	4	**12**
	(Germany) Steffi Graf (7)	Jun 12, 1995	Aug 14, 1995	9	292
	(Germany) Steffi Graf (7)	Aug 15, 1995	Nov 3, 1996	64	356
	(United States) Monica Seles (4)	Aug 15, 1995	Nov 3, 1996	64	177
	(Germany) Steffi Graf (7)	Nov 4, 1996	Nov 17, 1996	2	358
	(Germany) Steffi Graf (7)	Nov 18, 1996	Nov 24, 1996	1	359
	(United States) Monica Seles (5)	Nov 18, 1996	Nov 24, 1996	1	**178**
	(Germany) Steffi Graf (7)	Nov 25, 1996	Mar 30, 1997	18	**377**^{‡}
8	**Martina Hingis** (SUI)	Mar 31, 1997	Oct 11, 1998	80	80
9	**Lindsay Davenport** (USA)	Oct 12, 1998	Feb 7, 1999	17	17
	(Switzerland) Martina Hingis (2)	Feb 8, 1999	Jul 4, 1999	21	101
	(United States) Lindsay Davenport (2)	Jul 5, 1999	Aug 8, 1999	5	22
	(Switzerland) Martina Hingis (3)	Aug 9, 1999	Apr 2, 2000	34	135
	(United States) Lindsay Davenport (3)	Apr 3, 2000	May 7, 2000	5	27
	(Switzerland) Martina Hingis (4)	May 8, 2000	May 14, 2000	1	136
	(United States) Lindsay Davenport (4)	May 15, 2000	May 21, 2000	1	28
	(Switzerland) Martina Hingis (5)	May 22, 2000	Oct 14, 2001	73	**209**
10	**Jennifer Capriati** (USA)	Oct 15, 2001	Nov 4, 2001	3	3
	(United States) Lindsay Davenport (5)	Nov 5, 2001	Jan 13, 2002	10	38
	(United States) Jennifer Capriati (2)	Jan 14, 2002	Feb 24, 2002	6	9
11	**Venus Williams** (USA)	Feb 25, 2002	Mar 17, 2002	3	3
	(United States) Jennifer Capriati (3)	Mar 18, 2002	Apr 21, 2002	5	14
	(United States) Venus Williams (2)	Apr 22, 2002	May 19, 2002	4	7
	(United States) Jennifer Capriati (4)	May 20, 2002	Jun 9, 2002	3	**17**
	(United States) Venus Williams (3)	Jun 10, 2002	Jul 7, 2002	4	**11**
12	**Serena Williams** (USA)	Jul 8, 2002	Aug 10, 2003	57	57
13	**Kim Clijsters** (BEL)	Aug 11, 2003	Oct 19, 2003	10	10
14	**Justine Henin** (BEL)	Oct 20, 2003	Oct 26, 2003	1	1
	(Belgium) Kim Clijsters (2)	Oct 27, 2003	Nov 9, 2003	2	12
	(Belgium) Justine Henin (2)	Nov 10, 2003	Sep 12, 2004	44	45
15	**Amélie Mauresmo** (FRA)	Sep 13, 2004	Oct 17, 2004	5	5
	(United States) Lindsay Davenport (6)	Oct 18, 2004	Aug 21, 2005	44	82
16	**Maria Sharapova** (RUS)	Aug 22, 2005	Aug 28, 2005	1	1
	(United States) Lindsay Davenport (7)	Aug 29, 2005	Sep 11, 2005	2	84
	(Russia) Maria Sharapova (2)	Sep 12, 2005	Oct 23, 2005	6	7
	(United States) Lindsay Davenport (8)	Oct 24, 2005	Jan 29, 2006	14	**98**
	(Belgium) Kim Clijsters (3)	Jan 30, 2006	Mar 19, 2006	7	19
	(France) Amélie Mauresmo (2)	Mar 20, 2006	Nov 12, 2006	34	**39**
	(Belgium) Justine Henin (3)	Nov 13, 2006	Jan 28, 2007	11	56
	(Russia) Maria Sharapova (3)	Jan 29, 2007	Mar 18, 2007	7	14
	(Belgium) Justine Henin (4)	Mar 19, 2007	May 18, 2008	61	**117**
	(Russia) Maria Sharapova (4)	May 19, 2008	Jun 8, 2008	3	17
17	**Ana Ivanovic** (SRB)	Jun 9, 2008	Aug 10, 2008	9	9
18	**Jelena Janković** (SRB)	Aug 11, 2008	Aug 17, 2008	1	1
	(Serbia) Ana Ivanovic (2)	Aug 18, 2008	Sep 7, 2008	3	**12**
	(United States) Serena Williams (2)	Sep 8, 2008	Oct 5, 2008	4	61
	(Serbia) Jelena Janković (2)	Oct 6, 2008	Feb 1, 2009	17	**18**
	(United States) Serena Williams (3)	Feb 2, 2009	Apr 19, 2009	11	72
19	**Dinara Safina** (RUS)	Apr 20, 2009	Oct 11, 2009	25	25
	(United States) Serena Williams (4)	Oct 12, 2009	Oct 25, 2009	2	74
	(Russia) Dinara Safina (2)	Oct 26, 2009	Nov 1, 2009	1	**26**
	(United States) Serena Williams (5)	Nov 2, 2009	Oct 10, 2010	49	123
20	**Caroline Wozniacki** (DEN)	Oct 11, 2010	Feb 13, 2011	18	18
	(Belgium) Kim Clijsters (4)	Feb 14, 2011	Feb 20, 2011	1	**20**
	(Denmark) Caroline Wozniacki (2)	Feb 21, 2011	Jan 29, 2012	49	67
21	**Victoria Azarenka** (BLR)	Jan 30, 2012	Jun 10, 2012	19	19
	(Russia) Maria Sharapova (5)	Jun 11, 2012	Jul 8, 2012	4	**21**
	(Belarus) Victoria Azarenka (2)	Jul 9, 2012	Feb 17, 2013	32	**51**
	(United States) Serena Williams (6)	Feb 18, 2013	Sep 11, 2016	**186**^{‡}	309
22	**Angelique Kerber** (GER)	Sep 12, 2016	Jan 29, 2017	20	20
	(United States) Serena Williams (7)	Jan 30, 2017	Mar 19, 2017	7	316
	(Germany) Angelique Kerber (2)	Mar 20, 2017	Apr 23, 2017	5	25
	(United States) Serena Williams (8)	Apr 24, 2017	May 14, 2017	3	**319**
	(Germany) Angelique Kerber (3)	May 15, 2017	Jul 16, 2017	9	**34**
23	**Karolína Plíšková** (CZE)	Jul 17, 2017	Sep 10, 2017	8	**8**
24	**Garbiñe Muguruza** (ESP)	Sep 11, 2017	Oct 8, 2017	4	**4**
25	**Simona Halep** (ROU)	Oct 9, 2017	Jan 28, 2018	16	16
	(Denmark) Caroline Wozniacki (3)	Jan 29, 2018	Feb 25, 2018	4	**71**
	(Romania) Simona Halep (2)	Feb 26, 2018	Jan 27, 2019	48	**64**
26	**Naomi Osaka** (JPN)	Jan 28, 2019	Jun 23, 2019	21	21
27	**Ashleigh Barty** (AUS)	Jun 24, 2019	Aug 11, 2019	7	7
	(Japan) Naomi Osaka (2)	Aug 12, 2019	Sep 8, 2019	4	**25**
	(Australia) Ashleigh Barty (2)	Sep 9, 2019	Mar 22, 2020	28	35
	Rankings frozen (COVID-19)	Mar 23, 2020	Aug 9, 2020	20	
	(Australia) Ashleigh Barty (2)	Aug 10, 2020	Apr 3, 2022	86	**121**
28	**Iga Świątek** (POL)	Apr 4, 2022	Sep 10, 2023	75	75
29	**Aryna Sabalenka** (Note: On 1 March 2022, the WTA announced that until further notice, players from Russia and Belarus would not be allowed to compete under the name or flag of Russia or Belarus following the 2022 Russian invasion of Ukraine. Aryna Sabalenka thus competed under no nationality during this time and her tenure as number 1 is not attributed to Belarus in the "Weeks at No. 1 by country" table.)	Sep 11, 2023	Nov 5, 2023	8	8
	(Poland) Iga Świątek (2)	Nov 6, 2023	Oct 20, 2024	50	**125**
	Aryna Sabalenka (2)	Oct 21, 2024	Sep 13, 2026	99	**107**
30	**Elena Rybakina** (KAZ)	Sep 14, 2026	Present	9	**9**

== Weeks at No. 1 ==
Current No. 1 player (weeks are automatically updated).

Active players in bold.

=== Total ===
No.	Player	Weeks
1	(Germany) Steffi Graf	377
2	(United States) Martina Navratilova	332
3	(United States) **Serena Williams**	319
4	(United States) Chris Evert	260
5	(Switzerland) Martina Hingis	209
6	(Socialist Federal Republic of Yugoslavia) / (Federal Republic of Yugoslavia) / (United States) Monica Seles	178
7	(Poland) **Iga Świątek**	125
8	(Australia) Ashleigh Barty	121
9	(Belgium) Justine Henin	117
10	**Aryna Sabalenka**	107
11	(United States) Lindsay Davenport	98
12	(Denmark) Caroline Wozniacki	71
13	(Romania) Simona Halep	64
14	(Belarus) **Victoria Azarenka**	51
15	(France) Amélie Mauresmo	39
16	(Germany) Angelique Kerber	34
17	(Russia) Dinara Safina	26
18	(Japan) **Naomi Osaka**	25
19	(United States) Tracy Austin	21
19	(Russia) Maria Sharapova	21
21	(Belgium) Kim Clijsters	20
22	(Serbia) Jelena Janković	18
23	(United States) Jennifer Capriati	17
24	(Spain) Arantxa Sánchez Vicario	12
24	(Serbia) Ana Ivanovic	12
26	(United States) **Venus Williams**	11
27	(Kazakhstan) **Elena Rybakina**	**9**
28	(Czech Republic) **Karolína Plíšková**	8
29	(Spain) Garbiñe Muguruza	4
30	(Australia) Evonne Goolagong Cawley	2

=== Consecutive ===
No.	Player	Weeks
1	(Germany) Steffi Graf	186
1	(United States) Serena Williams	186
3	(United States) Martina Navratilova	156
4	(Australia) Ashleigh Barty	114
5	(United States) Chris Evert	113
6	Aryna Sabalenka	99
7	(Germany) Steffi Graf (2)	94
8	(Socialist Federal Republic of Yugoslavia) / (Federal Republic of Yugoslavia) Monica Seles	91
9	(United States) Martina Navratilova (2)	90
10	(Germany) Steffi Graf (3)	87
11	(Switzerland) Martina Hingis	80
12	(United States) Chris Evert (2)	76
13	(Poland) Iga Świątek	75
14	(Switzerland) Martina Hingis (2)	73
15	(United States) Monica Seles (2)	64
16	(Belgium) Justine Henin	61
17	(United States) Serena Williams (2)	57
18	(Poland) Iga Świątek (2)	50
19	(United States) Serena Williams (3)	49
19	(Denmark) Caroline Wozniacki	49
	Current streak in **bold**.	

== Year-end No. 1 players ==
The source for this through to 2012 is the 2012 WTA Tour Official Guide, page 178.

* Player was ranked No. 1 throughout the entire calendar year.

=== By year ===
Year	Player
1975	Chris Evert (USA)
1976	(United States) Chris Evert (2)
1977^{*}	(United States) Chris Evert (3)
1978	Martina Navratilova (USA)
1979	(United States) Martina Navratilova (2)
1980	(United States) Chris Evert (4)
1981^{*}	(United States) Chris Evert (5)
1982	(United States) Martina Navratilova (3)
1983^{*}	(United States) Martina Navratilova (4)
1984^{*}	(United States) Martina Navratilova (5)
1985	(United States) Martina Navratilova (6)
1986^{*}	(United States) Martina Navratilova (7)
1987	Steffi Graf (FRG)
1988^{*}	(West Germany) Steffi Graf (2)
1989^{*}	(West Germany) Steffi Graf (3)
1990^{*}	(Germany) Steffi Graf (4)
1991	Monica Seles (YUG)
1992^{*}	(Federal Republic of Yugoslavia) Monica Seles (2)
1993	(Germany) Steffi Graf (5)
1994^{*}	(Germany) Steffi Graf (6)
1995	(Germany) Steffi Graf (7) (United States) Monica Seles (3)
1996^{*}	(Germany) Steffi Graf (8)
1997	Martina Hingis (SUI)
1998	Lindsay Davenport (USA)
1999	(Switzerland) Martina Hingis (2)
2000	(Switzerland) Martina Hingis (3)

=== By year (continued) ===
Year	Player
2001	(United States) Lindsay Davenport (2)
2002	Serena Williams (USA)
2003	Justine Henin (BEL)
2004	(United States) Lindsay Davenport (3)
2005	(United States) Lindsay Davenport (4)
2006	(Belgium) Justine Henin (2)
2007	(Belgium) Justine Henin (3)
2008	Jelena Janković (SRB)
2009	(United States) Serena Williams (2)
2010	Caroline Wozniacki (DEN)
2011	(Denmark) Caroline Wozniacki (2)
2012	Victoria Azarenka (BLR)
2013	(United States) Serena Williams (3)
2014^{*}	(United States) Serena Williams (4)
2015^{*}	(United States) Serena Williams (5)
2016	Angelique Kerber (GER)
2017	Simona Halep (ROU)
2018	(Romania) Simona Halep (2)
2019	Ashleigh Barty (AUS)
2020^{*}	(Australia) Ashleigh Barty (2)
2021^{*}	(Australia) Ashleigh Barty (3)
2022	Iga Świątek (POL)
2023	(Poland) Iga Świątek (2)
2024	Aryna Sabalenka
2025^{*}	Aryna Sabalenka (2)
2026	Elena Rybakina (KAZ)

=== Per player ===
No.	Total
8	(Germany) Steffi Graf
7	(United States) Martina Navratilova
5	(United States) Chris Evert
5	(United States) Serena Williams
4	(United States) Lindsay Davenport
3	(Socialist Federal Republic of Yugoslavia) / (United States) Monica Seles
3	(Switzerland) Martina Hingis
3	(Belgium) Justine Henin
3	(Australia) Ashleigh Barty
2	(Denmark) Caroline Wozniacki
2	(Romania) Simona Halep
2	(Poland) Iga Świątek
2	Aryna Sabalenka
1	(Serbia) Jelena Janković
1	(Belarus) Victoria Azarenka
1	(Germany) Angelique Kerber
1	(Kazakhstan) Elena Rybakina

No.	Consecutive
5	(United States) Martina Navratilova
4	(Germany) Steffi Graf (x2)
3	(United States) Chris Evert
3	(United States) Serena Williams
3	(Australia) Ashleigh Barty
2	(United States) Martina Navratilova
2	(United States) Chris Evert
2	(Socialist Federal Republic of Yugoslavia) Monica Seles
2	(Switzerland) Martina Hingis
2	(United States) Lindsay Davenport
2	(Belgium) Justine Henin
2	(Denmark) Caroline Wozniacki
2	(Romania) Simona Halep
2	(Poland) Iga Świątek
2	Aryna Sabalenka

== Players who became No. 1 before having won a major tournament ==
Player	First ranked No. 1	First Grand Slam final	First Grand Slam title
(Belgium) Kim Clijsters	August 11, 2003	2001 French Open (June 2001) (1st of 8)	2005 US Open (1st of 4, retired in 2022)
(France) Amélie Mauresmo	September 13, 2004	1999 Australian Open (January 1999) (1st of 3)	2006 Australian Open (1st of 2, retired in 2009)
(Serbia) Jelena Janković	August 11, 2008	2008 US Open (September 2008) (only final)	None (retired in 2017)
(Russia) Dinara Safina	April 20, 2009	2008 French Open (June 2008) (1st of 3)	None (retired in 2014)
(Denmark) Caroline Wozniacki	October 11, 2010	2009 US Open (September 2009) (1st of 3)	2018 Australian Open (only title, retired 2024)
(Czech Republic) Karolína Plíšková	July 17, 2017	2016 US Open (September 2016) (1st of 2)	None (still active)
(Romania) Simona Halep	October 9, 2017	2014 French Open (June 2014) (1st of 5)	2018 French Open (1st of 2, retired in 2025)

== Time span between first and last dates No. 1 was held ==
Current No. 1 player (date and age are updated automatically).
- Active players and age records indicated in **bold**.

Time span	Player	First held No. 1		Last held No. 1	
Time span	Player	Date	Age	Date	Age
14 years, 310 days	(United States) Serena Williams	Jul 8, 2002	20 years, 285 days	May 14, 2017	**35 years, 230 days**
10 years, 21 days	(United States) Chris Evert	Nov 3, 1975	20 years, 317 days	Nov 24, 1985	30 years, 338 days
9 years, 225 days	(Germany) Steffi Graf	Aug 17, 1987	18 years, 64 days	Mar 30, 1997	27 years, 289 days
9 years, 37 days	(United States) Martina Navratilova	Jul 10, 1978	21 years, 265 days	Aug 16, 1987	30 years, 302 days
7 years, 193 days	(Belgium) Kim Clijsters	Aug 11, 2003	20 years, 64 days	Feb 20, 2011	27 years, 257 days
7 years, 137 days	(Denmark) **Caroline Wozniacki**	Oct 11, 2010	20 years, 92 days	Feb 25, 2018	27 years, 229 days
7 years, 109 days	(United States) Lindsay Davenport	Oct 12, 1998	22 years, 126 days	Jan 29, 2006	29 years, 235 days
6 years, 321 days	(Russia) Maria Sharapova	Aug 22, 2005	18 years, 125 days	Jul 8, 2012	25 years, 80 days
5 years, 258 days	(Socialist Federal Republic of Yugoslavia) Monica Seles	Mar 11, 1991	17 years, 99 days	Nov 24, 1996	22 years, 358 days
4 years, 211 days	(Belgium) Justine Henin	Oct 20, 2003	21 years, 141 days	May 18, 2008	25 years, 352 days
4 years, 197 days	(Switzerland) Martina Hingis	Mar 31, 1997	**16 years, 182 days**	Oct 14, 2001	21 years, 14 days
3 years, 2 days	**Aryna Sabalenka**	Sep 11, 2023	25 years, 129 days	Sep 13, 2026	28 years, 131 days
2 years, 283 days	(Australia) Ashleigh Barty	Jun 24, 2019	23 years, 61 days	Apr 3, 2022	25 years, 344 days
2 years, 199 days	(Poland) **Iga Świątek**	Apr 4, 2022	20 years, 308 days	Oct 20, 2024	23 years, 142 days
2 years, 60 days	(France) Amélie Mauresmo	Sep 13, 2004	25 years, 70 days	Nov 12, 2006	27 years, 130 days
1 year, 110 days	(Romania) Simona Halep	Oct 9, 2017	26 years, 12 days	Jan 27, 2019	27 years, 122 days
1 year, 18 days	(Belarus) **Victoria Azarenka**	Jan 30, 2012	22 years, 183 days	Feb 17, 2013	23 years, 201 days
307 days	(Germany) Angelique Kerber	Sep 12, 2016	28 years, 238 days	Jul 16, 2017	29 years, 179 days
237 days	(United States) Jennifer Capriati	Oct 15, 2001	25 years, 200 days	Jun 9, 2002	26 years, 72 days
224 days	(United States) Tracy Austin	Apr 7, 1980	17 years, 117 days	Nov 17, 1980	17 years, 341 days
223 days	(Japan) **Naomi Osaka**	Jan 28, 2019	21 years, 104 days	Sep 8, 2019	21 years, 327 days
195 days	(Russia) Dinara Safina	Apr 20, 2009	22 years, 358 days	Nov 1, 2009	23 years, 188 days
174 days	(Serbia) Jelena Janković	Aug 11, 2008	23 years, 165 days	Feb 1, 2009	23 years, 339 days
132 days	(United States) **Venus Williams**	Feb 25, 2002	21 years, 253 days	Jul 7, 2002	22 years, 20 days
125 days	(Spain) Arantxa Sánchez Vicario	Feb 6, 1995	23 years, 50 days	Jun 11, 1995	23 years, 175 days
90 days	(Serbia) Ana Ivanovic	Jun 9, 2008	20 years, 216 days	Sep 7, 2008	20 years, 306 days
56 days	(Kazakhstan) **Elena Rybakina**	Sep 14, 2026	27 years, 89 days	November 9, 2026	27 years, 145 days
55 days	(Czech Republic) **Karolína Plíšková**	Jul 17, 2017	25 years, 118 days	Sep 10, 2017	25 years, 173 days
27 days	(Spain) Garbiñe Muguruza	Sep 11, 2017	23 years, 338 days	Oct 8, 2017	24 years, 0 days
13 days	(Australia) Evonne Goolagong Cawley	Apr 26, 1976	24 years, 270 days	May 9, 1976	24 years, 283 days

== Weeks at No. 1 by decade ==
- Current No. 1 player indicated in italic.

=== 1970s* ===
* — Starting November 1975

158	Evert

57	Navratilova

2	Goolagong Cawley

=== 1980s ===
275	Navratilova

124	Graf

102	Evert

21	Austin

=== 1990s ===
253	Graf

178	Seles

122	Hingis

22	Davenport

12	Sánchez Vicario

=== 2000s ===
117	Henin

87	Hingis

83	S Williams

76	Davenport

39	Mauresmo

26	Safina

19	Clijsters

18	Janković

17	Capriati

17	Sharapova

12	Ivanovic

11	V Williams

=== 2010s ===
236	S Williams

71	Wozniacki

64	Halep

51	Azarenka

34	Kerber

25	Osaka

24	Barty

8	Plíšková

4	Sharapova

4	Muguruza

1	Clijsters

=== 2020s ===
WTA rankings were frozen from March 23, 2020 to August 9, 2020.

125	Świątek

107	Sabalenka

97	Barty

9	Rybakina

- Stats are automatically updated on Mondays (UTC).

== Weeks at No. 1 by country ==
- Current No. 1 player indicated in **bold**.

Weeks	Country	Players
1,123	United States	Chris Evert, Martina Navratilova, Tracy Austin, Monica Seles*, Lindsay Davenport, Jennifer Capriati, Venus Williams, Serena Williams
411	Germany	Steffi Graf, Angelique Kerber
209	Switzerland	Martina Hingis
143	(Socialist Federal Republic of Yugoslavia) / (Federal Republic of Yugoslavia) / Yugoslavia/Serbia	Monica Seles*, Ana Ivanovic, Jelena Janković
137	Belgium	Kim Clijsters, Justine Henin
125	Poland	Iga Świątek
123	Australia	Evonne Goolagong Cawley, Ashleigh Barty
71	Denmark	Caroline Wozniacki
64	Romania	Simona Halep
51	Belarus	Victoria Azarenka
47	Russia	Maria Sharapova, Dinara Safina
39	France	Amélie Mauresmo
25	Japan	Naomi Osaka
16	Spain	Arantxa Sánchez Vicario, Garbiñe Muguruza
**9**	**Kazakhstan**	**Elena Rybakina**
8	Czech Republic	Karolína Plíšková

Weeks are updated automatically.
* Monica Seles is included twice due to change of citizenship.

== See also ==
- World number 1 ranked female tennis players (includes rankings before 1975)
- ITF World Champions
- List of WTA number 1 ranked doubles tennis players
- List of ATP number 1 ranked singles tennis players
- List of ATP number 1 ranked doubles tennis players
- Current WTA rankings
- Top ten ranked female tennis players
- Top ten ranked female tennis players (1921–1974)
- List of highest ranked tennis players per country
