= 1997 Rexona Cup – Doubles =

Doubles
- 1997 Rexona Cup
- 1996 Champions: (Spain) Arantxa Sánchez Vicario (Netherlands) Brenda Schultz-McCarthy

Final
- Champions: (Germany) Anke Huber (France) Mary Pierce
- Runners-up: (Romania) Ruxandra Dragomir (Croatia) Iva Majoli
- Score: 2–6, 7–6, 6–2

Details
- Draw: 16
- Seeds: 4

Events
| Singles | Doubles |
| ← 1996 · | Hamburg European Open | · 1998 → |

The 1997 Rexona Cup - Singles was a tennis event played on outdoor clay courts at the Am Rothenbaum in Hamburg, Germany. The 1997 Rexona Cup tournament was held from 28 April until 4 May 1997, and was part of Tier II of the 1997 WTA Tour.

Arantxa Sánchez Vicario and Brenda Schultz-McCarthy were the defending champions but they competed with different partners that year, Sánchez Vicario with Inés Gorrochategui and Schultz-McCarthy with Larisa Savchenko.

Savchenko and Schultz-McCarthy lost in the first round to Ruxandra Dragomir and Iva Majoli. Gorrochategui and Sánchez Vicario lost in the quarterfinals to Dragomir and Majoli. Anke Huber and Mary Pierce won in the final 2–6, 7–6, 6–2 against Dragomir and Majoli.

== Seeds ==
Champion seeds are indicated in bold text while text in italics indicates the round in which those seeds were eliminated.

1. (Latvia) Larisa Savchenko / (Netherlands) Brenda Schultz-McCarthy (first round)
2. (United States) Gigi Fernández / (Spain) Conchita Martínez (semifinals)
3. (France) Sandrine Testud / (Netherlands) Caroline Vis (quarterfinals)
4. (Ukraine) Olga Lugina / (Germany) Elena Wagner (quarterfinals)

== Draw ==
Key

- Q = Qualifier
- WC = Wild card
- LL = Lucky loser
- Alt = Alternate
- ITF = ITF entry
- PR = Protected ranking
- SR = Special ranking
- SE = Special exempt
- JE = Junior exempt
- JR = Junior Accelerator Programme entrant
- CO = College Accelerator Programme entrant
- NG = Next Gen Accelerator Program entrant
- w/o = Walkover
- r = Retired
- d = Defaulted

First round
1 | (Latvia) L Savchenko (Netherlands) B Schultz-McCarthy | 3 | 4
(Romania) **R Dragomir** (Croatia) **I Majoli** | **6** | **6**
(Czech Republic) E Melicharová (Poland) A Olsza | 3 | 3
(Argentina) **I Gorrochategui** (Spain) A Sánchez Vicario | **6** | **6**
3 | (France) **S Testud** (Netherlands) **C Vis** | 5 | **7** | **6**
(Argentina) F Labat (Germany) B Rittner | **7** | 6 | 2
(Sweden) **Å Carlsson** (Argentina) **P Suárez** | **6** | **6**
(Bulgaria) S Krivencheva (Switzerland) P Schnyder | 4 | 1
(Hungary) V Csurgo (France) A-G Sidot | 2 | 4
(Germany) **A Huber** (France) **M Pierce** | **6** | **6**
WC | (Germany) S Klösel (Germany) J Wöhr | **7** | 5 | 2
4 | (Ukraine) **O Lugina** (Germany) **E Wagner** | 5 | **7** | **6**
Q | (Argentina) M Díaz Oliva (Austria) K Kschwendt | 2 | 5
(United States) **A Grossman** (Czech Republic) **P Langrová** | **6** | **7**
(Germany) K Freye (Germany) S Meier | 2 | 2
2 | (United States) **G Fernández** (Spain) **C Martínez** | **6** | **6**

Quarterfinals
(Romania) **R Dragomir** (Croatia) **I Majoli** | **6** | 4 | **6**
(Argentina) I Gorrochategui (Spain) A Sánchez Vicario | 3 | **6** | 1
3 | (France) S Testud (Netherlands) C Vis | 5 | **6** | 3
(Sweden) **Å Carlsson** (Argentina) **P Suárez** | **7** | 2 | **6**
(Germany) **A Huber** (France) **M Pierce** | **7** | **7**
4 | (Ukraine) O Lugina (Germany) E Wagner | 5 | 5
(United States) A Grossman (Czech Republic) P Langrová | 2 | 3
2 | (United States) **G Fernández** (Spain) **C Martínez** | **6** | **6**

Semifinals
(Romania) **R Dragomir** (Croatia) **I Majoli** | **6** | **6**
(Sweden) Å Carlsson (Argentina) P Suárez | 2 | 1
(Germany) **A Huber** (France) **M Pierce** | **6** | 4 | **6**
2 | (United States) G Fernández (Spain) C Martínez | 3 | **6** | 4

Final
(Romania) Ruxandra Dragomir (Croatia) Iva Majoli | **6** | 6 | 2
(Germany) **Anke Huber** (France) **Mary Pierce** | 2 | **7** | **6**
