= 1993 Citizen Cup =

- Date: 26 April – 2 May
- Edition: 7th
- Category: Tier II tournament
- Draw: 32S / 16D
- Prize money: $375,000
- Surface: Clay / outdoor
- Location: Hamburg, Germany
- Venue: Am Rothenbaum

Champions

Singles
- (Spain) Arantxa Sánchez Vicario

Doubles
- (Germany) Steffi Graf / (Australia) Rennae Stubbs
- WTA Hamburg

The Citizen Cup was a women's tennis tournament played on outdoor clay courts. It was the seventh edition of the Citizen Cup and was a Tier II tournament on the 1993 WTA Tour. The tournament took place from 26 April to 2 May 1993 at the Am Rothenbaum venue, in Hamburg, Germany.

== Seles stabbing ==
This tournament would later attract infamy for being the location where then World No. 1 Monica Seles was stabbed during a singles quarterfinal match with then World No. 14 Magdalena Maleeva by an obsessed fan of Steffi Graf, Günter Parche. The stabbing prompted an increase in security at subsequent tennis events. Seles would not return to professional tennis until August 1995 following the incident, and never played in Germany again.

== Entrants ==
=== Seeds ===
Country	Player	Ranking	Seeding
(Federal Republic of Yugoslavia) YUG	Monica Seles	1	1
GER	Steffi Graf	2	2
ESP	Arantxa Sánchez Vicario	3	3
CZE	Jana Novotná	9	4
SUI	Manuela Maleeva-Fragniere	11	5
GER	Anke Huber	10	6
BUL	Magdalena Maleeva	14	7
BUL	Katerina Maleeva	17	8

=== Other entrants ===
The following players received entry from the qualifying draw:

- (Germany) Petra Begerow
- (Austria) Beate Reinstadler
- (Sweden) Maria Strandlund

The following players received entry from a Lucky loser spot:

- (Ukraine) Elena Brioukhovets

== Finals ==
=== Singles ===
(Spain) Arantxa Sánchez Vicario defeated (Germany) Steffi Graf, 6–3, 6–3

- It was Sánchez Vicario's fourth title of the year, and the twelfth of her career.

=== Doubles ===
(Germany) Steffi Graf / (Australia) Rennae Stubbs defeated (Latvia) Larisa Neiland / (Czech Republic) Jana Novotná, 6–4, 7–6^{(7–5)}
