= 1997 Rexona Cup – Singles =

Singles
- 1997 Rexona Cup
- 1996 Champion: (Spain) Arantxa Sánchez Vicario

Final
- Champion: (Croatia) Iva Majoli
- Runner-up: (Romania) Ruxandra Dragomir
- Score: 6–3, 6–2

Details
- Draw: 28 (4 Q / 2 WC )
- Seeds: 8

Events
Singles	Doubles
← 1996 ·	WTA German Open	· 1998 →

The 1997 Rexona Cup singles was a tennis event for women played on outdoor clay courts at the Am Rothenbaum in Hamburg, Germany. The 1997 Rexona Cup tournament was held from April 28 through May 4, 1997, and was part of Tier II of the 1997 WTA Tour.

Arantxa Sánchez Vicario was the defending champion but lost in the second round to Petra Langrová. Iva Majoli won in the final 6–3, 6–2 against Ruxandra Dragomir.

== Seeds ==
A champion seed is indicated in bold text while text in italics indicates the round in which that seed was eliminated. The top four seeds received a bye to the second round.

1. (Spain) Arantxa Sánchez Vicario (second round)
2. (Spain) Conchita Martínez (quarterfinals)
3. (Germany) Anke Huber (second round)
4. (Croatia) **Iva Majoli (champion)**
5. (Netherlands) Brenda Schultz-McCarthy (first round)
6. (France) Mary Pierce (quarterfinals)
7. (Romania) Ruxandra Dragomir (final)
8. (France) Sandrine Testud (first round)

== Draw ==
Key

- Q = Qualifier
- WC = Wild card
- LL = Lucky loser
- Alt = Alternate
- ITF = ITF entry
- PR = Protected ranking
- SR = Special ranking
- SE = Special exempt
- JE = Junior exempt
- JR = Junior Accelerator Programme entrant
- CO = College Accelerator Programme entrant
- NG = Next Gen Accelerator Program entrant
- w/o = Walkover
- r = Retired
- d = Defaulted

=== Final ===
Final
7	(Romania) Ruxandra Dragomir	3	2
4	(Croatia) **Iva Majoli**	**6**	**6**

=== Section 1 ===
First round
(Czech Republic) **P Langrová**	**6**	**6**
(Italy) F Lubiani	3	3
Q	(Ukraine) **O Lugina**	**6**	**6**
(Italy) F Perfetti	4	1
(France) **A-G Sidot**	**6**	**6**
5	(Netherlands) B Schultz-McCarthy	2	1
Q	(Poland) A Olsza	2	0
(Austria) **B Schett**	**6**	**6**
(Argentina) **F Labat**	**6**	**6**
(Sweden) Å Carlsson	3	2
(Czech Republic) A Gerši	4	3
7	(Romania) **R Dragomir**	**6**	**6**

Second round
1	(Spain) A Sánchez Vicario	5	3
(Czech Republic) **P Langrová**	**7**	**6**
Q	(Ukraine) O Lugina	3	3
(France) **A-G Sidot**	**6**	**6**
3	(Germany) A Huber	4	6
(Austria) **B Schett**	**6**	**7**
(Argentina) F Labat	5	3
7	(Romania) **R Dragomir**	**7**	**6**

Quarterfinals
(Czech Republic) P Langrová	1	**6**	1
(France) **A-G Sidot**	**6**	4	**6**
(Austria) B Schett	1	5
7	(Romania) **R Dragomir**	**6**	**7**

Semifinals
(France) A-G Sidot	4	0
7	(Romania) **R Dragomir**	**6**	**6**

=== Section 2 ===
First round
6	(France) **M Pierce**	**6**	**6**
(Switzerland) P Schnyder	1	1
(Argentina) **P Suárez**	**6**	**6**
(United States) A Grossman	4	3
(Romania) C Cristea	**6**	3	5
(Spain) **M Serna**	4	**6**	**7**
8	(France) S Testud	3	1
Q	(Spain) **M Sánchez Lorenzo**	**6**	**6**
WC	(Germany) **J Kandarr**	**6**	**7**
Q	(Bulgaria) S Krivencheva	1	6
(Germany) **B Rittner**	**6**	5	**6**
WC	(Germany) S Klösel	1	**7**	3

Second round
6	(France) **M Pierce**	3	**7**	**6**
(Argentina) P Suárez	**6**	6	3
(Spain) M Serna	4	5
4	(Croatia) **I Majoli**	**6**	**7**
Q	(Spain) **M Sánchez Lorenzo**	**6**	**6**
WC	(Germany) J Kandarr	2	1
(Germany) B Rittner	5	0
2	(Spain) **C Martínez**	**7**	**6**

Quarterfinals
6	(France) M Pierce	**6**	4	4
4	(Croatia) **I Majoli**	2	**6**	**6**
Q	(Spain) **M Sánchez Lorenzo**	**7**	5	**6**
2	(Spain) C Martínez	5	**7**	2

Semifinals
4	(Croatia) **I Majoli**	**6**	**6**
Q	(Spain) M Sánchez Lorenzo	2	3
