= 1995 Citizen Cup (tennis) =

- Date: 1–7 May
- Edition: 11th
- Category: Tier II
- Draw: 28S / 16D
- Prize money: $430,000
- Surface: Clay / outdoor
- Location: Hamburg, Germany
- Venue: Am Rothenbaum

Champions

Singles
- (Spain) Conchita Martínez

Doubles
- (United States) Gigi Fernández / (Switzerland) Martina Hingis
← 1994 ·	WTA Hamburg	· 1996 →

The 1995 Citizen Cup was a women's tennis tournament played on outdoor clay courts at the Am Rothenbaum in Hamburg, Germany that was part of Tier II of the 1995 WTA Tour. It was the 11th edition of the tournament and was held from 1 May through 7 May 1995. Second-seeded Conchita Martínez won the singles title.

== Finals ==
=== Singles ===
(Spain) Conchita Martínez defeated (Switzerland) Martina Hingis 6–1, 6–0

- It was Martínez's 3rd singles title of the year and the 23rd of her career.

=== Doubles ===
(United States) Gigi Fernández / (Switzerland) Martina Hingis defeated (Spain) Conchita Martínez / (Argentina) Patricia Tarabini 6–2, 6–3

- It was Fernández's 2nd title of the year and the 57th of her career. It was Hingis' only title of the year and the 1st of her career.
