= 1995 Citizen Cup – Doubles =

Doubles
- 1995 Citizen Cup

Final
- Champions: (United States) Gigi Fernández (Switzerland) Martina Hingis
- Runners-up: (Spain) Conchita Martínez (Argentina) Patricia Tarabini
- Score: 6–2, 6–3

Details
- Draw: 16
- Seeds: 4

Events
Singles	Doubles
← 1994 ·	Hamburg European Open	· 1996 →

The 1995 Citizen Cup doubles was a tennis event played on outdoor clay courts at the Am Rothenbaum in Hamburg in Germany that was part of Tier II of the 1995 WTA Tour. The 1995 Citizen Cup tournament was held from 1 May through 7 May 1995.

Jana Novotná and Arantxa Sánchez Vicario were the defending champions but only Novotná competed that year with Mary Pierce. Novotná and Pierce lost in the first round to Elena Makarova and Eugenia Maniokova. Gigi Fernández and Martina Hingis won in the final 6–2, 6–3 against Conchita Martínez and Patricia Tarabini.

== Seeds ==
Champion seeds are indicated in bold text while text in italics indicates the round in which those seeds were eliminated.

1. (United States) Meredith McGrath / (Latvia) Larisa Savchenko (semifinals)
2. (France) Julie Halard / (Netherlands) Brenda Schultz (first round)
3. (Spain) Conchita Martínez / (Argentina) Patricia Tarabini (final)
4. (Netherlands) Kristie Boogert / (Netherlands) Nicole Muns-Jagerman (quarterfinals)

== Draw ==
Key

- Q = Qualifier
- WC = Wild card
- LL = Lucky loser
- Alt = Alternate
- ITF = ITF entry
- PR = Protected ranking
- SR = Special ranking
- SE = Special exempt
- JE = Junior exempt
- JR = Junior Accelerator Programme entrant
- CO = College Accelerator Programme entrant
- NG = Next Gen Accelerator Program entrant
- w/o = Walkover
- r = Retired
- d = Defaulted

First round
1	(United States) **M McGrath** (Latvia) **L Savchenko**	**6**	**6**
Q	(Croatia) N Ercegović (Croatia) S Talaja	2	2
(Netherlands) **I Driehuis** (France) **N van Lottum**	1	**6**	**6**
(Finland) N Dahlman (France) C Dhenin	**6**	0	2
3	(Spain) **C Martínez** (Argentina) **P Tarabini**	**7**	**7**
(Italy) L Golarsa (Netherlands) C Vis	6	6
(Germany) **C Porwik** (Germany) **W Probst**	**7**	**6**
(Germany) A Huber (Germany) B Rittner	5	4
(Russia) **E Makarova** (Russia) **E Maniokova**	**6**	**6**
(Czech Republic) J Novotná (France) M Pierce	2	2
(Argentina) M Paz (Germany) C Singer	4	4
4	(Netherlands) **K Boogert** (Netherlands) **N Muns-Jagerman**	**6**	**6**
(Bulgaria) K Maleeva (Slovakia) R Zrubáková	2	2
(Ukraine) **O Lugina** (Bulgaria) **E Pampoulova**	**6**	**6**
WC	(United States) **G Fernández** (Switzerland) **M Hingis**	**6**	**6**
2	(France) J Halard (Netherlands) B Schultz	3	4

Quarterfinals
1	(United States) **M McGrath** (Latvia) **L Savchenko**	**6**	**6**
(Netherlands) I Driehuis (France) N van Lottum	2	2
3	(Spain) **C Martínez** (Argentina) **P Tarabini**	**6**	**3**
(Germany) C Porwik (Germany) W Probst	3	0	r
(Russia) **E Makarova** (Russia) **E Maniokova**	**6**	**6**
4	(Netherlands) K Boogert (Netherlands) N Muns-Jagerman	3	2
(Ukraine) O Lugina (Bulgaria) E Pampoulova	**6**	2	0
WC	(United States) **G Fernández** (Switzerland) **M Hingis**	4	**6**	**6**

Semifinals
1	(United States) M McGrath (Latvia) L Savchenko	1	6
3	(Spain) **C Martínez** (Argentina) **P Tarabini**	**6**	**7**
(Russia) E Makarova (Russia) E Maniokova	3	0
WC	(United States) **G Fernández** (Switzerland) **M Hingis**	**6**	**6**

Final
3	(Spain) Conchita Martínez (Argentina) Patricia Tarabini	2	3
WC	(United States) **Gigi Fernández** (Switzerland) **Martina Hingis**	**6**	**6**
