= 1996 Rexona Cup =

- Date: 29 April – 5 May
- Edition: 12th
- Category: Tier II
- Draw: 28S / 14D
- Prize money: $450,000
- Surface: Clay / outdoor
- Location: Hamburg, Germany
- Venue: Am Rothenbaum

Champions

Singles
- (Spain) Arantxa Sánchez Vicario

Doubles
- (Spain) Arantxa Sánchez Vicario (Netherlands) Brenda Schultz-McCarthy
← 1995 ·	Hamburg European Open	· 1997 →

The 1996 Rexona Cup was a women's tennis tournament played on outdoor clay courts at the Am Rothenbaum in Hamburg in Germany that was part of the Tier II category of the 1996 WTA Tour. It was the 12th edition of the tournament and was held from 29 April through 5 May 1996. First-seeded Arantxa Sánchez Vicario won the singles title.

== Finals ==
=== Singles ===
(Spain) Arantxa Sánchez Vicario defeated (Spain) Conchita Martínez 4–6, 7–6, 6–0

- It was Sánchez Vicario's 2nd and last singles title of the year and the 24th of her career.

=== Doubles ===
(Spain) Arantxa Sánchez Vicario / (Netherlands) Brenda Schultz-McCarthy defeated (United States) Gigi Fernández / (Switzerland) Martina Hingis 4–6, 7–6^{(12–10)}, 6–4

- It was Sánchez Vicario's 5th doubles title of the year and the 45th of her career. It was Schultz-McCarthy's 3rd doubles title of the year and the 7th of her career.
