= 1999 Betty Barclay Cup =

- Date: 27 April – 2 May
- Edition: 15th
- Category: Tier II
- Prize money: $520,000
- Surface: Clay / outdoor
- Location: Hamburg Germany
- Venue: Am Rothenbaum

Champions

Singles
- (United States) Venus Williams

Doubles
- (Latvia) Larisa Neiland / (Spain) Arantxa Sánchez Vicario
- WTA Hamburg

The 1999 Betty Barclay Cup was a women's tennis tournament played on outdoor clay courts at the Am Rothenbaum in Hamburg in Germany that was part of Tier II of the 1999 WTA Tour. The tournament was held from 27 April through 2 May 1999. Second-seeded Venus Williams won the singles title.

== Finals ==
=== Singles ===
(United States) Venus Williams defeated (France) Mary Pierce, 6–0, 6–3

- It was Williams' 4th title of the year and the 11th of her career.

=== Doubles ===
(Latvia) Larisa Neiland / (Spain) Arantxa Sánchez Vicario defeated (South Africa) Amanda Coetzer / (Czech Republic) Jana Novotná, 6–2, 6–1

== Entrants ==
=== Seeds ===
- Ranking date 19 April 1999.

Country	Player	Rank	Seed
CZE	Jana Novotná	4	1
USA	Venus Williams	6	2
ESP	Arantxa Sánchez Vicario	7	3
FRA	Mary Pierce	8	4
FRA	Nathalie Tauziat	11	5
BEL	Dominique Van Roost	15	6
RSA	Amanda Coetzer	16	7
ESP	Conchita Martínez	18	8

=== Other entrants ===
The following players received wildcards into the singles main draw:

- (Germany) Andrea Glass
- (Germany) Julia Abe

The following players received wildcards into the doubles main draw:

- (Germany) Julia Abe / (Germany) Jana Kandarr

The following players received entry from the singles qualifying draw:

- (Austria) Marion Maruska
- (Germany) Anca Barna
- (Russia) Elena Dementieva
- (Canada) Jana Nejedly

The following players received entry from the doubles qualifying draw:

- (Federal Republic of Yugoslavia) Sandra Načuk / (Austria) Sylvia Plischke
