= Heike Rusch =

German tennis player

- Country (sports): Germany
- Born: 2 July 1976 (age 48)
- Prize money: $48,058

Singles
- Career record: 75–64
- Career titles: 1 ITF
- Highest ranking: No. 133 (27 July 1993)

Doubles
- Career record: 3–11
- Career titles: 0
- Highest ranking: No. 582 (18 September 1995)

Heike Rusch (born 2 July 1976) is a former professional tennis player from Germany.

== Biography ==
Rusch had success on the junior circuit before playing professionally. She won the Junior Orange Bowl (Under 14s) in 1990 and was a member of Germany's Junior Fed Cup winning team in 1991. Most notably she won the 1993 Australian Open girls' singles title.

On the professional tour, she had a best ranking of 133 in the world, playing her final season in 1995.

== ITF finals ==
=== Singles (1–1) ===
$25,000 tournaments
$10,000 tournaments

Result	No.	Date	Tournament	Surface	Opponent	Score
Loss	1.	26 August 1991	ITF Klagenfurt, Austria	Clay	(Slovenia) Barbara Mulej	6–2, 6–7, 3–6
Win	2.	14 September 1992	ITF Sofia, Bulgaria	Clay	(Netherlands) Sandra van der Aa	6–3, 4–6, 6–3
