= Ruxandra Dragomir =

Romanian tennis player

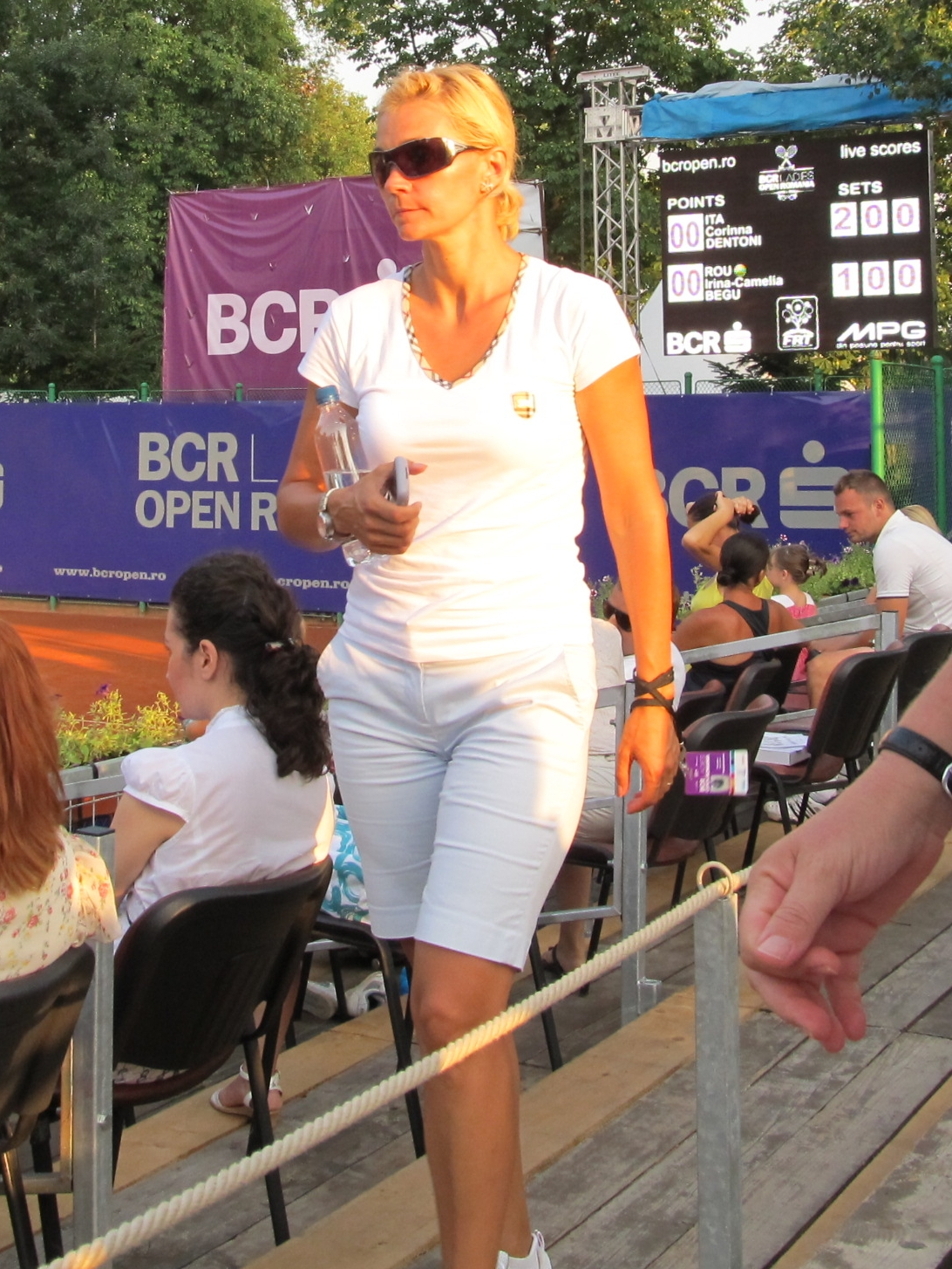
- Ruxandra Dragomir at the 2011 Romania Open
- Country (sports): Romania
- Residence: Bucharest, Romania
- Born: 24 October 1972 (age 53) Piteşti, Romania
- Height: 1.68 m (5 ft 6 in)
- Turned pro: 1990
- Retired: 2005
- Plays: Right-handed (one-handed backhand)
- Prize money: $1,861,426

Singles
- Career record: 290–233
- Career titles: 4 WTA, 7 ITF
- Highest ranking: No. 15 (25 August 1997)

Grand Slam singles results
- Australian Open: 4R (1997, 1998)
- French Open: QF (1997)
- Wimbledon: 3R (1996)
- US Open: 2R (1994, 1999, 2000)

Doubles
- Career record: 216–197
- Career titles: 5 WTA, 8 ITF
- Highest ranking: No. 21 (8 September 1997)

Ruxandra Dragomir Ilie (born 24 October 1972) is a retired tennis player from Romania.

She won four singles and five doubles titles on the WTA Tour during her career. The right-hander reached her highest individual WTA ranking on 25 August 1997, when she became the No. 15 of the world. Between 2009 and 2013 she was the president of Romanian Tennis Federation. Her best performance at a Grand Slam tournament came when she got to the quarterfinals of the 1997 French Open, defeating Sonya Jeyaseelan, Yayuk Basuki, Karina Habšudová and Nicole Arendt, before losing to the eventual champion, Iva Majoli.

Dragomir retired from professional tennis in 2005.

== WTA Tour finals ==
=== Singles: 8 (4 titles, 4 runner-ups) ===
Legend
Grand Slam tournaments
Tier I
Tier II (0–2)
Tier III, IV & V (4–2)

Result	W/L	Date	Tournament	Category	Surface	Opponent	Score
Loss	0–1	Jul 1995	Austrian Open	Tier IV	Clay	(Austria) Judith Wiesner	6–7^{(4–7)}, 3–6
Win	1–1	May 1996	Budapest Grand Prix, Hungary	Tier IV	Clay	(Austria) Melanie Schnell	7–6^{(8–6)}, 6–1
Win	2–1	Sep 1996	Prague Open, Czech Republic	Tier IV	Clay	(Switzerland) Patty Schnyder	6–2, 3–6, 6–4
Win	3–1	Nov 1996	Pattaya Open, Thailand	Tier IV	Hard	(Thailand) Tamarine Tanasugarn	7–6^{(7–4)}, 6–4
Loss	3–2	Apr 1997	Hamburg Open, Germany	Tier II	Clay	(Croatia) Iva Majoli	3–6, 2–6
Win	4–2	Jun 1997	Rosmalen Open, Netherlands	Tier III	Grass	(Netherlands) Miriam Oremans	5–7, 6–2, 6–4
Loss	4–3	Apr 1999	Amelia Island Championships, US	Tier II	Clay	(United States) Monica Seles	2–6, 3–6
Loss	4–4	Jun 2000	Rosmalen Open, Netherlands	Tier III	Grass	(Switzerland) Martina Hingis	2–6, 0–3 ret.

=== Doubles: 10 (5 titles, 5 runner-ups) ===
Legend
Grand Slam tournaments
Tier I
Tier II (0–2)
Tier III, IV & V (4–2)

Result	No.	Date	Tournament	Surface	Partner	Opponents	Score
Win	1.	Jul 1994	Palermo Open, Italy	Clay	(Italy) Laura Garrone	(Italy) Alice Canepa (Italy) Giulia Casoni	6–1, 6–0
Win	2.	May 1995	Bournemouth, Great Britain	Clay	(South Africa) Mariaan de Swardt	(Australia) Kerry-Anne Guse (Canada) Patricia Hy-Boulais	6–3, 7–5
Loss	1.	Jan 1997	Gold Coast, Australia	Hard	(Italy) Silvia Farina	(Japan) Naoko Kijimuta (Japan) Nana Miyagi	7–6, 6–1
Loss	2.	Apr 1997	Hamburg Open, Germany	Clay	(Croatia) Iva Majoli	(Germany) Anke Huber (France) Mary Pierce	6–4, 6–7^{(1–7)}, 2–6
Win	3.	Jul 1997	Prague Open, Czech Republic	Clay	(Slovakia) Karina Habšudová	(Czech Republic) Eva Martincová (Czech Republic) Helena Vildová	6–1, 5–7, 6–2
Win	4.	Jul 1997	Warsaw Open, Poland	Clay	(Argentina) Inés Gorrochategui	(Australia) Catherine Barclay (Germany) Meike Babel	6–4, 6–0
Loss	3.	Jul 2000	Palermo Open, Italy	Clay	(Spain) Virginia Ruano Pascual	(Italy) Silvia Farina Elia (Italy) Rita Grande	4–6, 6–0, 6–7^{(6–8)}
Loss	4.	Jan 2001	Hobart International, Australia	Hard	(Spain) Virginia Ruano Pascual	(Russia) Elena Likhovtseva (Zimbabwe) Cara Black	4–6, 1–6
Win	5.	Jun 2001	Rosmalen Open, Netherlands	Grass	(Russia) Nadia Petrova	(Belgium) Kim Clijsters (Netherlands) Miriam Oremans	7–6^{(7–5)}, 6–7^{(5–7)}, 6–4
Loss	5.	Jul 2001	Knokke-Heist, Belgium	Clay	(Romania) Andreea Ehritt-Vanc	(Spain) Virginia Ruano Pascual (Spain) Magüi Serna	4–6, 3–6

== ITF finals ==
Legend
$75,000 tournaments
$50,000 tournaments
$25,000 tournaments
$10,000 tournaments

=== Singles (7–2) ===
Result	No.	Date	Location	Surface	Opponent	Score
Win	1.	13 August 1990	Rebecq, Belgium	Clay	(Netherlands) Sandra Begijn	6–3, 7–5
Win	2.	17 September 1990	Rabac, Yugoslavia	Clay	(Socialist Federal Republic of Yugoslavia) Gorana Matić	6–3, 6–1
Win	3.	24 September 1990	Mali Lošinj, Yugoslavia	Clay	(Romania) Irina Spîrlea	6–3, 6–1
Loss	1.	1 October 1990	Šibenik, Yugoslavia	Clay	(Socialist Federal Republic of Yugoslavia) Barbara Mulej	6–7, 4–6
Win	4.	25 March 1991	Supetar, Yugoslavia	Clay	(France) Angelique Olivier	6–4, 4–6, 6–0
Loss	2.	8 June 1992	Reggio Emilia, Italy	Clay	(Switzerland) Emanuela Zardo	1–6, 6–7^{(2)}
Win	5.	31 August 1992	Klagenfurt, Austria	Clay	(Sweden) Åsa Carlsson	6–4, 6–3
Win	6.	30 November 1992	Le Havre, France	Clay	(France) Sarah Pitkowski-Malcor	7–6, 7–5
Win	7.	25 April 1998	Prostějov, Czech Republic	Clay	(Czech Republic) Adriana Gerši	6–0, 6–0

=== Doubles (8–6) ===
Result	No.	Date	Location	Surface	Partner	Opponents	Score
Loss	1.	13 August 1990	Rebecq, Belgium	Clay	(Romania) Irina Spîrlea	(Belgium) Els Callens (Belgium) Caroline Wuillot	4–6, 2–6
Win	1.	20 August 1990	Koksijde, Belgium	Clay	(Romania) Irina Spîrlea	(South Africa) Erda Crous (Czechoslovakia) Lucie Ludvigová	6–1, 2–6, 6–3
Win	2.	17 September 1990	Rabac, Yugoslavia	Clay	(Romania) Irina Spîrlea	(Czechoslovakia) Katarína Studeníková (Czechoslovakia) Gabriela Vesela	1–6, 6–3, 6–4
Loss	2.	12 August 1991	Pisticci, Italy	Hard	(Romania) Irina Spîrlea	(Australia) Justine Hodder (Socialist Federal Republic of Yugoslavia) Maja Murić	4–6, 6–3, 3–6
Loss	3.	3 February 1992	Jakarta, Indonesia	Clay	(Romania) Irina Spîrlea	(Australia) Nicole Pratt (Australia) Angie Woolcock	1–6, 0–6
Win	3.	14 June 1992	Modena, Italy	Clay	(Bulgaria) Elena Pampoulova	(France) Alexandra Fusai (Switzerland) Natalie Tschan	6–3, 7–6^{(5)}
Win	4.	22 June 1992	Reggio Emilia, Italy	Clay	(Switzerland) Natalie Tschan	(France) Barbara Collet (France) Alexandra Fusai	3–6, 6–2, 6–1
Loss	4.	22 November 1992	Nottingham, UK	Carpet (i)	(Romania) Irina Spîrlea	(Belgium) Els Callens (Bulgaria) Elena Pampoulova	6–7^{(3)}, 4–6
Win	5.	30 November 1992	Le Havre, France	Clay	(Romania) Irina Spîrlea	(Germany) Angela Kerek (Germany) Sabine Lohmann	6–3, 7–6
Loss	5.	2 May 2004	Cagnes-sur-Mer, France	Clay	(Germany) Antonia Matic	(Bulgaria) Lubomira Bacheva (Czech Republic) Eva Birnerová	6–3, 6–7^{(4)}, 3–6
Win	6.	16 May 2004	St. Gaudens, France	Clay	(Romania) Andreea Ehritt-Vanc	(Poland) Marta Domachowska (Argentina) Natalia Gussoni	6–3, 6–1
Win	7.	15 June 2004	Gorizia, Italy	Carpet (i)	(Romania) Andreea Ehritt-Vanc	(Germany) Martina Müller (Germany) Angelika Rösch	7–6^{(7)}, 6–2
Loss	6.	17 October 2004	Ashburn, United States	Hard	(United States) Samantha Reeves	(United States) Kelly McCain (United States) Kristen Schlukebir	2–6, 2–6
Win	8.	24 October 2004	Cary, United States	Hard	(United States) Samantha Reeves	(Canada) Maureen Drake (Japan) Nana Miyagi	4–6, 6–3, 6–3

== Grand Slam singles performance timeline ==
Key
W	F	SF	QF	#R	RR	Q#	DNQ	A	NH

(W) winner; (F) finalist; (SF) semifinalist; (QF) quarterfinalist; (#R) rounds 4, 3, 2, 1; (RR) round-robin stage; (Q#) qualification round; (DNQ) did not qualify; (A) absent; (NH) not held; (SR) strike rate (events won / competed); (W–L) win–loss record.

Tournament	1993	1994	1995	1996	1997	1998	1999	2000	2001	2002	2003	2004	W–L
Australian Open	A	1R	2R	2R	4R	4R	3R	3R	3R	A	A	1R	14–9
French Open	4R	4R	4R	2R	QF	3R	4R	4R	1R	A	A	A	22–9
Wimbledon	2R	2R	1R	3R	1R	1R	2R	1R	1R	A	A	A	5–9
US Open	1R	2R	1R	1R	1R	1R	2R	2R	A	A	A	A	3–8
Win–loss	4–3	5–4	4–4	4–4	7–4	5–4	7–4	6–4	2–3	0–0	0–0	0–1	44–35

=== Head-to-head records ===
- Serena Williams 0-1
- Venus Williams 0-3
- Martina Hingis 0-4
- Lindsay Davenport 0-7
- Anna Kournikova 2-1
- Dominique Monami 1-2
- Kim Clijsters 0-1
- Arantxa Sánchez Vicario 0-5
- Nadia Petrova 2-0
