= Petra Begerow =

German tennis player

- Country (sports): Germany
- Born: 14 April 1975 (age 49); Bad Kreuznach, West Germany
- Retired: 2000
- Prize money: $340,523

Singles
- Career record: 122-124
- Career titles: 2 ITF
- Highest ranking: No. 29 (8 April 1996)

Grand Slam singles results
- Australian Open: 1R (1994, 95, 96, 97)
- French Open: 2R (1994, 95, 96, 97)
- Wimbledon: 1R (1994, 95, 96, 97)
- US Open: 1R (1996, 97)

Doubles
- Career record: 11-20
- Highest ranking: No. 194 (15 September 1997)

Petra Begerow (born 14 April 1975 in Bad Kreuznach) is a former German professional tennis player.

== Career ==
She reached her highest WTA singles ranking, 29, on 8 April 1996. She reached the second round of the French Open 4 times, 1994-1997. That was also her highest achievement in Grand Slam tournaments.

== ITF Finals ==
=== Singles (2–1) ===
Legend
$75,000 tournaments
$25,000 tournaments

Outcome	No.	Date	Tournament	Surface	Opponent	Score
Winner	1.	12 July 1993	Darmstadt, Germany	Clay	(Slovenia) Barbara Mulej	6–0, 6–3
Winner	2.	8 August 1993	Sopot, Poland	Clay	(Slovakia) Katarína Studeníková	6–3, 4–6, 7–5
Runner-up	3.	20 June 1999	Istanbul, Turkey	Hard	(Italy) Giulia Casoni	5–7, 6–1, 4–6
