= 1993 BVV Prague Open – Singles =

Singles
- 1993 BVV Prague Open

Final
- Champion: (Ukraine) Natalia Medvedeva
- Runner-up: (Germany) Meike Babel
- Score: 6–3, 6–2

Details
- Draw: 32 (2WC/4Q/1LL)
- Seeds: 8

Events
Singles	Doubles
- BVV Prague Open

In the inaugural edition of the tournament, Natalia Medvedeva won the title by defeating Meike Babel 6–3, 6–2 in the final.

Radka Zrubáková, winner of the last tournament held at Prague in 1992, did not compete this year.

== Seeds ==
1. (Argentina) Inés Gorrochategui (quarterfinals)
2. (Italy) Linda Ferrando (quarterfinals)
3. (Czech Republic) Kateřina Kroupová (first round)
4. (Argentina) Patricia Tarabini (semifinals)
5. (Germany) Wiltrud Probst (first round)
6. (Czech Republic) Radka Bobková (second round)
7. (Canada) Helen Kelesi (quarterfinals)
8. (Germany) Meike Babel (final)

== Draw ==
Key

- Q = Qualifier
- WC = Wild card
- LL = Lucky loser
- Alt = Alternate
- ITF = ITF entry
- PR = Protected ranking
- SR = Special ranking
- SE = Special exempt
- JE = Junior exempt
- JR = Junior Accelerator Programme entrant
- CO = College Accelerator Programme entrant
- NG = Next Gen Accelerator Program entrant
- w/o = Walkover
- r = Retired
- d = Defaulted

=== Finals ===
Semifinals
8	(Germany) Meike Babel	6	6
(Netherlands) Nicole Muns-Jagerman	4	3
4	(Argentina) Patricia Tarabini	7^{8}	4	5
(Ukraine) Natalia Medvedeva	6^{6}	6	7

Final
8	(Germany) Meike Babel	3	2
(Ukraine) Natalia Medvedeva	6	6

=== Top half ===
First round
1	(Argentina) I Gorrochategui	6	6
WC	(Czech Republic) A Havrlíková	0	0
LL	(Sweden) Å Carlsson	5	6	6
(Australia) K Godridge	7	4	4
(Germany) H Rusch	6	6
(Netherlands) M Kiene	1	3
(Finland) P Thorén	6^{1}	1
8	(Germany) M Babel	7^{7}	6
3	(Czech Republic) K Kroupová	0	3
(France) L Ghirardi	6	6
Q	(Czechoslovakia) P Kučová	5	0
(Netherlands) N Muns-Jagerman	7	6
(Czech Republic) A Strnadová	6	3	6
(Italy) K Piccolini	2	6	3
Q	(Czechoslovakia) J Pospíšilová	6	6^{8}	3
6	(Czech Republic) R Bobková	2	7^{10}	6

Second round
1	(Argentina) I Gorrochategui	6	6
LL	(Sweden) Å Carlsson	2	1
(Germany) H Rusch
8	(Germany) M Babel	w/o
(France) L Ghirardi	6	4	3
(Netherlands) N Muns-Jagerman	4	6	6
(Czech Republic) A Strnadová	6	7
6	(Czech Republic) R Bobková	4	5

Quarterfinals
1	(Argentina) I Gorrochategui	2	4
8	(Germany) M Babel	6	6
(Netherlands) N Muns-Jagerman	6	6
(Czech Republic) A Strnadová	2	0

Semifinals
8	(Germany) M Babel	6	6
(Netherlands) N Muns-Jagerman	4	3

=== Bottom half ===
First round
7	(Canada) H Kelesi	6	4	6
(Czech Republic) P Langrová	2	6	4
(Sweden) C Dahlman	6	6
(Italy) F Perfetti	3	2
WC	(Czech Republic) E Krejčová	2	0
(Germany) S Frankl	6	6
(United States) H Cioffi	3	2
4	(Argentina) P Tarabini	6	6
5	(Germany) W Probst	5	0
(Ukraine) N Medvedeva	7	6
(Italy) L Golarsa	6	7
Q	(Czechoslovakia) L Lásková	2	5
(Slovakia) K Habšudová	7	6
(Bulgaria) E Pampoulova-Wagner	5	3
Q	(Italy) C Salvi	6^{3}	1
2	(Italy) L Ferrando	7^{7}	6

Second round
7	(Canada) H Kelesi	6	2	6
(Sweden) C Dahlman	3	6	4
(Germany) S Frankl	2	6	2
4	(Argentina) P Tarabini	6	3	6
(Ukraine) N Medvedeva	4	7^{7}	7
(Italy) L Golarsa	6	6^{4}	5
(Slovakia) K Habšudová	3	6	1
2	(Italy) L Ferrando	6	0	6

Quarterfinals
7	(Canada) H Kelesi	3	3
4	(Argentina) P Tarabini	6	6
(Ukraine) N Medvedeva	6	5	6
2	(Italy) L Ferrando	2	7	4

Semifinals
4	(Argentina) P Tarabini	7^{8}	4	5
(Ukraine) N Medvedeva	6^{6}	6	7
