= 1993 Citroën Cup =

- Date: 12–18 July
- Edition: 21st
- Category: Tier III
- Draw: 32S / 16D
- Prize money: $150,000
- Surface: Clay / outdoor
- Location: Kitzbühel, Austria
- Venue: Casino Stadion

Champions

Singles
- (Germany) Anke Huber

Doubles
- (China) Fang Li / (Belgium) Dominique Monami
← 1992 ·	WTA Austrian Open	· 1994 →

The 1993 Citroën Cup was a women's tennis tournament played on outdoor clay courts at the Casino Stadion in Kitzbühel, Austria that was part of Tier III of the 1993 WTA Tour. It was the 21st edition of the tournament and was held from 12 July until 18 July 1993. First-seeded Anke Huber won the singles title and earned $27,000 first-prize money.

== Finals ==
=== Singles ===
(Germany) Anke Huber defeated (Austria) Judith Wiesner 6–4, 6–1

- It was Huber's only singles title of the year and the 3rd of her career.

=== Doubles ===
(China) Li Fang / (Belgium) Dominique Monami defeated (Croatia) Maja Murić / (Czech Republic) Pavlína Rajzlová 6–2, 6–1

- It was Li's only doubles title of the year and the 2nd of her career. It was Monami's only doubles title of the year and the 1st of her career.
