= 1992 HTC Prague Open – Doubles =

Doubles
- 1992 HTC Prague Open

Final
- Champions: (Germany) Karin Kschwendt (Austria) Petra Ritter
- Runners-up: (Czechoslovakia) Eva Švíglerová (Netherlands) Noëlle van Lottum
- Score: 6–4, 2–6, 7–5

Details
- Draw: 16 (1WC/1Q)
- Seeds: 4

Events
| Singles | Doubles |
- HTC Prague Open

Karin Kschwendt and Petra Ritter won the title by defeating Eva Švíglerová and Noëlle van Lottum 6–4, 2–6, 7–5 in the final.

== Seeds ==
1. (Czechoslovakia) Petra Langrová / (Czechoslovakia) Radka Zrubáková (semifinals)
2. (Netherlands) Monique Kiene / (Netherlands) Miriam Oremans (semifinals)
3. (Germany) ~~Meike Babel~~ / (Germany) ~~Wiltrud Probst~~ (withdrew)
4. (Germany) Karin Kschwendt / (Austria) Petra Ritter (champions)

== Draw ==
Key

- Q = Qualifier
- WC = Wild card
- LL = Lucky loser
- Alt = Alternate
- ITF = ITF entry
- PR = Protected ranking
- SR = Special ranking
- SE = Special exempt
- JE = Junior exempt
- JR = Junior Accelerator Programme entrant
- CO = College Accelerator Programme entrant
- NG = Next Gen Accelerator Program entrant
- w/o = Walkover
- r = Retired
- d = Defaulted

=== Draw ===
First round
1 | (Czechoslovakia) P Langrová (Czechoslovakia) R Zrubáková | 6 | 6
(Czechoslovakia) P Holubová (Czechoslovakia) M Štusková | 2 | 4
(Czechoslovakia) R Bobková (Czechoslovakia) H Vildová | 6
(Czechoslovakia) I Havrlíková (Czechoslovakia) M Kratochvílová | 3^{r}
4 | (Germany) K Kschwendt (Austria) P Ritter | 4 | 6 | 6
(Czechoslovakia) Z Málková (Czechoslovakia) E Martincová | 6 | 3 | 3
(Czechoslovakia) I Jankovská (Czechoslovakia) E Melicharová | 4 | 5
Q | (Moldova) S Komleva (Czechoslovakia) P Kučová | 6 | 7
(Czechoslovakia) J Pospíšilová (Czechoslovakia) D Szabová | 3 | 6^{9}
(Germany) R Kochta (Germany) V Martinek | 6 | 7^{11}
WC | (Czechoslovakia) L Cenková (Czechoslovakia) Z Nemšáková | 6^{4} | 2
(Czechoslovakia) E Švíglerová (France) N van Lottum | 7^{7} | 6
(Belgium) D Monami (Belgium) S Wasserman | 2 | 1^{r}
(Czechoslovakia) K Kroupová (Czechoslovakia) A Noháčová | 6 | 4
(United States) L Spadea (Romania) I Spîrlea | 2 | 1
2 | (Netherlands) M Kiene (Netherlands) M Oremans | 6 | 6

Quarterfinals
1 | (Czechoslovakia) P Langrová (Czechoslovakia) R Zrubáková | 6 | 6
(Czechoslovakia) R Bobková (Czechoslovakia) H Vildová | 1 | 2
4 | (Germany) K Kschwendt (Austria) P Ritter | 6 | 6
Q | (Moldova) S Komleva (Czechoslovakia) P Kučová | 3 | 4
(Germany) R Kochta (Germany) V Martinek | 4 | 6 | 3
(Czechoslovakia) E Švíglerová (France) N van Lottum | 6 | 2 | 6
(Czechoslovakia) K Kroupová (Czechoslovakia) A Noháčová | 6 | 5 | 1
2 | (Netherlands) M Kiene (Netherlands) M Oremans | 4 | 7 | 6

Semifinals
1 | (Czechoslovakia) P Langrová (Czechoslovakia) R Zrubáková | 6 | 6^{5} | 4
4 | (Germany) K Kschwendt (Austria) P Ritter | 4 | 7^{7} | 6
(Czechoslovakia) E Švíglerová (France) N van Lottum | 6 | 3 | 6
2 | (Netherlands) M Kiene (Netherlands) M Oremans | 4 | 6 | 3

Final
4 | (Germany) K Kschwendt (Austria) P Ritter | 6 | 2 | 7
(Czechoslovakia) E Švíglerová (France) N van Lottum | 4 | 6 | 5
