= 1993 BVV Prague Open – Doubles =

Doubles
- 1993 BVV Prague Open

Final
- Champions: (Argentina) Inés Gorrochategui; (Argentina) Patricia Tarabini
- Runners-up: (Italy) Laura Golarsa; (Netherlands) Caroline Vis
- Score: 6–2, 6–1

Details
- Draw: 16 (1WC/1Q)
- Seeds: 4

Events
Singles	Doubles
- BVV Prague Open

In the inaugural edition of the tournament, Inés Gorrochategui and Patricia Tarabini won the title by defeating Laura Golarsa and Caroline Vis 6–2, 6–1 in the final.

Karin Kschwendt and Petra Ritter, winners of the last tournament held at Prague in 1992, did not compete this year.

== Seeds ==
1. (Argentina) Inés Gorrochategui / (Argentina) Patricia Tarabini (champions)
2. (Italy) Linda Ferrando / (Czech Republic) Petra Langrová (first round)
3. (Ukraine) Natalia Medvedeva / (Germany) Wiltrud Probst (first round)
4. (Sweden) Maria Lindström / (Sweden) Maria Strandlund (first round)

== Draw ==
Key

- Q = Qualifier
- WC = Wild card
- LL = Lucky loser
- Alt = Alternate
- ITF = ITF entry
- PR = Protected ranking
- SR = Special ranking
- SE = Special exempt
- JE = Junior exempt
- JR = Junior Accelerator Programme entrant
- CO = College Accelerator Programme entrant
- NG = Next Gen Accelerator Program entrant
- w/o = Walkover
- r = Retired
- d = Defaulted

=== Draw ===
First round

Quarterfinals

Semifinals

Final

1
(Argentina) I Gorrochategui
(Argentina) P Tarabini
6
6

- (Latvia) A Blumberga
- (Czech Republic) J Pospíšilová
4
2

1
(Argentina) I Gorrochategui
(Argentina) P Tarabini
6
6

(Czech Republic) I Havrlíková
(Czech Republic) H Vildová
6
1
6

- (Czech Republic) I Havrlíková
- (Czech Republic) H Vildová
3
4

- (United States) H Cioffi
- (Bulgaria) E Pampoulova-Wagner
1
6
1

1
(Argentina) I Gorrochategui
(Argentina) P Tarabini
6
4
6

4
- (Sweden) M Lindström
- (Sweden) M Strandlund
4
1

- (Netherlands) K Boogert
- (Netherlands) N Muns-Jagerman
4
6
1

(Netherlands) K Boogert
(Netherlands) N Muns-Jagerman
6
6

(Netherlands) K Boogert
(Netherlands) N Muns-Jagerman
6
6

WC
(Czech Republic) L Cenková
(Czech Republic) Gabriela Netíková
2
4

- (Czech Republic) R Bobková
- (Slovakia) K Habšudová
3
0

(Czech Republic) R Bobková
(Slovakia) K Habšudová
6
6

1
(Argentina) I Gorrochategui
(Argentina) P Tarabini
6
6

- (Czech Republic) I Jankovská
- (Czech Republic) E Melicharová
1
5

- (Italy) L Golarsa
- (Netherlands) C Vis
2
1

(Australia) K Godridge
(Netherlands) M Kiene
6
7

- (Australia) K Godridge
- (Netherlands) M Kiene
5
6^{1}

(Italy) L Golarsa
(Netherlands) C Vis
6
7^{8}

(Italy) L Golarsa
(Netherlands) C Vis
7
7^{7}

3
- (Ukraine) N Medvedeva
- (Germany) W Probst
2
6^{6}

(Italy) L Golarsa
(Netherlands) C Vis
6
6

- (Germany) M Babel
- (Czech Republic) K Kroupová
2
6^{3}

- (Argentina) B Fulco-Villella
- (Finland) P Thorén
1
4

Q
(Czech Republic) P Holubová
(Czech Republic) L Němečková
6
7^{7}

Q
- (Czech Republic) P Holubová
- (Czech Republic) L Němečková
1
3

(Argentina) B Fulco-Villella
(Finland) P Thorén
6
6

(Argentina) B Fulco-Villella
(Finland) P Thorén
6
6

2
- (Italy) L Ferrando
- (Czech Republic) P Langrová
4
4
