= 1993 BVV Prague Open =

Women's tennis tournament

- Date: 13–18 July
- Edition: 1st
- Category: Tier IV
- Draw: 32S / 16D
- Prize money: $100,000
- Surface: Clay / outdoor
- Location: Prague, Czech Republic
- Venue: I. Czech Lawn Tennis Club

Champions

Singles
- (Ukraine) Natalia Medvedeva

Doubles
- (Argentina) Inés Gorrochategui / (Argentina) Patricia Tarabini
- BVV Prague Open

The 1993 BVV Prague Open was a women's tennis tournament played on outdoor clay courts at the I. Czech Lawn Tennis Club in Prague in the Czech Republic that was part of Tier IV of the 1993 WTA Tour. It was the first edition of the tournament and was held from 13 July until 18 July 1993. Unseeded Natalia Medvedeva won the singles title.

== Finals ==
=== Singles ===
(Ukraine) Natalia Medvedeva defeated (Germany) Meike Babel 6–3, 6–2

- It was Medvedeva's 1st singles title of the year and the 3rd of her career.

=== Doubles ===
(Argentina) Inés Gorrochategui / (Argentina) Patricia Tarabini defeated (Italy) Laura Golarsa / (Netherlands) Caroline Vis 6–2, 6–1

- It was Gorrochategui's 1st doubles title of the year and the 3rd of her career. It was Tarabini's 1st doubles title of the year and the 8th of her career.
