= 1994 BVV Prague Open =

- Date: 10–15 May
- Edition: 2nd
- Category: Tier IV
- Draw: 32S / 16D
- Prize money: $100,000
- Surface: Clay / outdoor
- Location: Prague, Czech Republic
- Venue: I. Czech Lawn Tennis Club

Champions

Singles
- (South Africa) Amanda Coetzer

Doubles
- (United States) Linda Harvey-Wild / (United States) Chanda Rubin
- BVV Prague Open

The 1994 BVV Prague Open was a women's tennis tournament played on outdoor clay courts at the I. Czech Lawn Tennis Club in Prague in the Czech Republic that was part of Tier IV of the 1994 WTA Tour. It was the second edition of the tournament and was held from 10 May until 15 May 1994. First-seeded Amanda Coetzer won the singles title.

== Finals ==
=== Singles ===
(South Africa) Amanda Coetzer defeated (Sweden) Åsa Carlsson 6–1, 7–6^{(16–14)}

- It was Coetzer's 1st singles title of the year and the 3rd of her career.

=== Doubles ===
(South Africa) Amanda Coetzer / (United States) Linda Harvey-Wild defeated (Netherlands) Kristie Boogert / (Italy) Laura Golarsa 6–4, 3–6, 6–2

- It was Coetzer's 1st doubles title of the year and the 3rd of her career. It was Harvey-Wild's 2nd doubles title of the year and of her career.

== See also ==
- 1994 Skoda Czech Open – men's tournament
