= 1993 Citroën Cup – Singles =

Singles
- 1993 Citroën Cup

Final
- Champion: (Germany) Anke Huber
- Runner-up: (Austria) Judith Wiesner
- Score: 6–4, 6–1

Details
- Draw: 32 (1WC/4Q/3LL)
- Seeds: 8

Events
Singles	Doubles
- WTA Austrian Open

Conchita Martínez was the defending champion, but chose to rest in order to compete at the Federation Cup the following cup.

Anke Huber won the title by defeating Judith Wiesner 6–4, 6–1 in the final.

== Seeds ==
1. (Germany) Anke Huber (champion)
2. (France) Mary Pierce (quarterfinals)
3. (Bulgaria) Katerina Maleeva (first round)
4. (Germany) Sabine Hack (semifinals, retired)
5. (Austria) Judith Wiesner (final)
6. (Germany) Barbara Rittner (second round)
7. (Italy) Sandra Cecchini (first round)
8. (Argentina) Florencia Labat (quarterfinals)

== Draw ==
Key

- Q = Qualifier
- WC = Wild card
- LL = Lucky loser
- Alt = Alternate
- ITF = ITF entry
- PR = Protected ranking
- SR = Special ranking
- SE = Special exempt
- JE = Junior exempt
- JR = Junior Accelerator Programme entrant
- CO = College Accelerator Programme entrant
- NG = Next Gen Accelerator Program entrant
- w/o = Walkover
- r = Retired
- d = Defaulted

=== Finals ===
Semifinals
1	(Germany) Anke Huber	4
4	(Germany) Sabine Hack	1^{r}
5	(Austria) Judith Wiesner	6	6
(Switzerland) Emanuela Zardo	3	4

Final
1	(Germany) Anke Huber	6	6
5	(Austria) Judith Wiesner	4	1

=== Top half ===
First round
1	(Germany) A Huber	6	6
(Israel) Y Segal	0	1
LL	(Czech Republic) E Martincová	3	6	5
(Germany) M Živec-Škulj	6	2	7
Q	(Croatia) M Palaveršić	1	7	1
(Spain) V Ruano Pascual	6	5	6
LL	(Austria) M Maruska	1	3
6	(Germany) B Rittner	6	6
4	(Germany) S Hack	6	6
(Germany) S Meier	3	0
Q	(Kazakhstan) E Likhovtseva	6	3	1
(China) F Li	1	6	6
(Italy) MF Bentivoglio	5	2
(Argentina) MJ Gaidano	7	6
(Croatia) N Ercegović	6	0	4
8	(Argentina) F Labat	1	6	6

Second round
1	(Germany) A Huber	6	7
(Germany) M Živec-Škulj	1	5
(Spain) V Ruano Pascual	6	6
6	(Germany) B Rittner	1	4
4	(Germany) S Hack	6	7
(China) F Li	3	5
(Argentina) MJ Gaidano	4	2
8	(Argentina) F Labat	6	6

Quarterfinals
1	(Germany) A Huber	6	6
(Spain) V Ruano Pascual	1	4
4	(Germany) S Hack	6	7
8	(Argentina) F Labat	4	5

Semifinals
1	(Germany) A Huber	4
4	(Germany) S Hack	1^{r}

=== Bottom half ===
First round
5	(Austria) J Wiesner	6	6
(France) N van Lottum	2	2
(Italy) S Farina	1	3
WC	(Austria) S Dopfer	6	6
(Italy) F Bonsignori	6	0	1
(Germany) V Martinek	2	6	6
Q	(Austria) B Schett	4	7	7^{7}
3	(Bulgaria) K Maleeva	6	5	6^{4}
7	(Italy) S Cecchini	6	3	4
Q	(Czech Republic) P Rajzlová	2	6	6
(Finland) N Dahlman	4	3
(Switzerland) E Zardo	6	6
(France) A Fusai	2	3
(Belgium) D Monami	6	6
LL	(Germany) Ad Barna	0	1
2	(France) M Pierce	6	6

Second round
5	(Austria) J Wiesner	6	6
WC	(Austria) S Dopfer	1	2
(Germany) V Martinek	6	3	3
Q	(Austria) B Schett	2	6	6
Q	(Czech Republic) P Rajzlová	0	3
(Switzerland) E Zardo	6	6
(Belgium) D Monami	4	3
2	(France) M Pierce	6	6

Quarterfinals
5	(Austria) J Wiesner	7	6
Q	(Austria) B Schett	5	2
(Switzerland) E Zardo	4	7^{7}	7^{7}
2	(France) M Pierce	6	6^{4}	6^{4}

Semifinals
5	(Austria) J Wiesner	6	6
(Switzerland) E Zardo	3	4
