= 2011 Allianz Cup =

- Date: 12 – 18 September
- Edition: 16th
- Location: Sofia, Bulgaria

Champions

Singles
- (Spain) Sílvia Soler Espinosa

Doubles
- (Russia) Nina Bratchikova / (Croatia) Darija Jurak
← 2010 ·	Allianz Cup	· 2012 →

The 2011 Allianz Cup was a professional tennis tournament played on clay courts. It was the 16th edition of the tournament which is part of the 2011 ITF Women's Circuit. It took place in Sofia, Bulgaria between 12 and 18 September 2011.

== WTA entrants ==
=== Seeds ===
Country	Player	Rank^{1}	Seed
SWE	Johanna Larsson	60	1
FRA	Mathilde Johansson	65	2
ESP	Laura Pous Tió	75	3
FRA	Alizé Cornet	95	4
ITA	Romina Oprandi	131	5
ESP	Sílvia Soler Espinosa	141	6
ROU	Alexandra Cadanțu	148	7
RUS	Nina Bratchikova	150	8

- ^{1} Rankings are as of August 29, 2011.

=== Other entrants ===
The following players received wildcards into the singles main draw:

- (Bulgaria) Radina Dimitrova
- (Germany) Hristina Dishkova
- (Bulgaria) Viktoriya Tomova
- (Bulgaria) Ani Vangelova

The following players received entry from the qualifying draw:

- (Czech Republic) Denisa Allertová
- (Romania) Cristina Mitu
- (Romania) Ioana Raluca Olaru
- (Bulgaria) Isabella Shinikova

The following players received entry by a lucky loser spot:

- (Hungary) Vaszilisza Bulgakova

== Champions ==
=== Singles ===
(Spain) Sílvia Soler Espinosa def. (Italy) Romina Oprandi, 2–6, 6–6, ret.

=== Doubles ===
(Russia) Nina Bratchikova / (Croatia) Darija Jurak def. (Romania) Alexandra Cadanțu / (Romania) Ioana Raluca Olaru, 6–4, 7–5
