= 1994 Styrian Open – Doubles =

Doubles
- 1994 Styrian Open

Final
- Champions: (Italy) Sandra Cecchini (Argentina) Patricia Tarabini
- Runners-up: (France) Alexandra Fusai (Slovakia) Karina Habšudová
- Score: 7–5, 7–5

Details
- Draw: 16 (1WC/1Q)
- Seeds: 4

Events
Singles	Doubles
- WTA Austrian Open

Li Fang and Dominique Monami were the defending champions, but both players opted to rest after competing in the Federation Cup the previous week.

Sandra Cecchini and Patricia Tarabini won the title by defeating Alexandra Fusai and Karina Habšudová 7–5, 7–5 in the final.

== Seeds ==
1. (Italy) Sandra Cecchini / (Argentina) Patricia Tarabini (champions)
2. (Germany) Barbara Rittner / (Germany) Caroline Schneider (quarterfinals)
3. (Ukraine) Elena Brioukhovets / (Russia) Eugenia Maniokova (quarterfinals)
4. (Italy) Silvia Farina / (Italy) Laura Garrone (semifinals)

== Draw ==
Key

- Q = Qualifier
- WC = Wild card
- LL = Lucky loser
- Alt = Alternate
- ITF = ITF entry
- PR = Protected ranking
- SR = Special ranking
- SE = Special exempt
- JE = Junior exempt
- JR = Junior Accelerator Programme entrant
- CO = College Accelerator Programme entrant
- NG = Next Gen Accelerator Program entrant
- w/o = Walkover
- r = Retired
- d = Defaulted

=== Draw ===
First round
1	(Italy) S Cecchini (Argentina) P Tarabini	6	6
(Czech Republic) K Hrdličková (Czech Republic) J Pospíšilová	4	2
(Czech Republic) P Kučová (Czech Republic) L Němečková	7^{7}	5	2
(Austria) P Ritter (France) N van Lottum	6^{2}	7	6
4	(Italy) S Farina (Italy) L Garrone	6	6
WC	(Austria) S Plischke (Austria) S Reichel	2	2
(Slovakia) J Husárová (Czech Republic) E Martincová	1	6	7^{7}
(Germany) V Martinek (Bulgaria) E Wagner	6	3	6^{4}
(Czech Republic) R Bobková (Czech Republic) L Richterová	3	3
(France) A Fusai (Slovakia) K Habšudová	6	6
(Germany) S Meier (Spain) J Souto	0	0
3	(Ukraine) E Brioukhovets (Russia) E Maniokova	6	6
Q	(Czech Republic) P Holubová (Czech Republic) K Kroupová	2	1
(Sweden) M Lindström (Sweden) M Strandlund	6	6
(Slovakia) K Studeníková (Slovakia) D Szabová	2	2
2	(Germany) B Rittner (Germany) C Schneider	6	6

Quarterfinals
1	(Italy) S Cecchini (Argentina) P Tarabini	6	6
(Austria) P Ritter (France) N van Lottum	1	2
4	(Italy) S Farina (Italy) L Garrone	4	6	6
(Slovakia) J Husárová (Czech Republic) E Martincová	6	2	1
(France) A Fusai (Slovakia) K Habšudová	6	7^{7}
3	(Ukraine) E Brioukhovets (Russia) E Maniokova	0	6^{4}
(Sweden) M Lindström (Sweden) M Strandlund	w/o
2	(Germany) B Rittner (Germany) C Schneider

Semifinals
1	(Italy) S Cecchini (Argentina) P Tarabini	6	6
4	(Italy) S Farina (Italy) L Garrone	4	3
(France) A Fusai (Slovakia) K Habšudová	6	6
(Sweden) M Lindström (Sweden) M Strandlund	3	4

Final
1	(Italy) S Cecchini (Argentina) P Tarabini	7	7
(France) A Fusai (Slovakia) K Habšudová	5	5
