= 1992 HTC Prague Open – Singles =

Singles
- 1992 HTC Prague Open

Final
- Champion: (Czechoslovakia) Radka Zrubáková
- Runner-up: (Czechoslovakia) Kateřina Kroupová
- Score: 6–3, 7–5

Details
- Draw: 32 (2WC/4Q/2LL)
- Seeds: 8

Events
Singles	Doubles
- HTC Prague Open

Radka Zrubáková won the title by defeating Kateřina Kroupová 6–3, 7–5 in the final.

== Seeds ==
1. (Czechoslovakia) Radka Zrubáková (champion)
2. (Czech Republic) Andrea Strnadová (first round)
3. (Germany) ~~Wiltrud Probst~~ (withdrew)
4. (Netherlands) Nicole Muns-Jagerman (second round)
5. (Germany) Veronika Martinek (semifinals)
6. (Germany) Meike Babel (second round)
7. (Belgium) Dominique Monami (first round)
8. (Switzerland) Christelle Fauche (first round)

== Draw ==
Key

- Q = Qualifier
- WC = Wild card
- LL = Lucky loser
- Alt = Alternate
- ITF = ITF entry
- PR = Protected ranking
- SR = Special ranking
- SE = Special exempt
- JE = Junior exempt
- JR = Junior Accelerator Programme entrant
- CO = College Accelerator Programme entrant
- NG = Next Gen Accelerator Program entrant
- w/o = Walkover
- r = Retired
- d = Defaulted

=== Finals ===
Semifinals
1	(Czechoslovakia) Radka Zrubáková	6	2	6
Q	(Netherlands) Monique Kiene	2	6	3
5	(Germany) Veronika Martinek	2	3
(Czechoslovakia) Kateřina Kroupová	6	6

Final
1	(Czechoslovakia) Radka Zrubáková	6	7
(Czechoslovakia) Kateřina Kroupová	3	5

=== Top half ===
First round
1	(Czechoslovakia) R Zrubáková	6	6
(Sweden) M Strandlund	0	4
(Socialist Federal Republic of Yugoslavia) N Ercegović	2	2
Q	(Czechoslovakia) P Kučová	6	6
(Belgium) S Wasserman	6	4	2
(Czechoslovakia) E Švíglerová	2	6	6
Q	(Sweden) C Dahlman	7^{7}	6
7	(Belgium) D Monami	6^{4}	4
4	(Netherlands) N Muns-Jagerman	6	6
(Czechoslovakia) D Szabová	0	4
(Germany) S Meier	6	6
(Australia) L Field	2	1
(Austria) P Ritter	3	4
Q	(Netherlands) M Kiene	6	6
(Romania) I Spîrlea	5	2
6	(Germany) M Babel	7	6

Second round
1	(Czechoslovakia) R Zrubáková	6	6
Q	(Czechoslovakia) P Kučová	0	1
(Czechoslovakia) E Švíglerová	2	6	6
Q	(Sweden) C Dahlman	6	3	0
4	(Netherlands) N Muns-Jagerman	6	3	3
(Germany) S Meier	3	6	6
Q	(Netherlands) M Kiene	6	0	6
6	(Germany) M Babel	4	6	4

Quarterfinals
1	(Czechoslovakia) R Zrubáková	6	5	6
(Czechoslovakia) E Švíglerová	2	7	2
(Germany) S Meier	1	6	2
Q	(Netherlands) M Kiene	6	0	6

Semifinals
1	(Czechoslovakia) R Zrubáková	6	2	6
Q	(Netherlands) M Kiene	2	6	3

=== Bottom half ===
First round
5	(Germany) V Martinek	6	6
(Czechoslovakia) R Bobková	1	1
(Socialist Federal Republic of Yugoslavia) B Mulej	5	6	5
LL	(Czechoslovakia) J Pospíšilová	7	4	7
(Netherlands) M Oremans	6^{4}	2
Q	(Netherlands) K Boogert	7^{7}	6
WC	(Czechoslovakia) Z Nemšáková	1	2
(France) N van Lottum	6	6
8	(Switzerland) C Fauche	2	3
(Czechoslovakia) K Kroupová	6	6
(Czechoslovakia) P Holubová	4	1
WC	(Czechoslovakia) Z Málková	6	6
LL	(Czechoslovakia) L Lásková	3	6	3
(Czechoslovakia) P Langrová	6	4	6
(Germany) K Kschwendt	6	6
2	(Czechoslovakia) A Strnadová	1	2

Second round
5	(Germany) V Martinek	7	6
LL	(Czechoslovakia) J Pospíšilová	5	0
Q	(Netherlands) K Boogert	6	6^{6}	4
(France) N van Lottum	2	7^{8}	6
(Czechoslovakia) K Kroupová	6	6
WC	(Czechoslovakia) Z Málková	3	1
(Czechoslovakia) P Langrová	4	5
(Germany) K Kschwendt	6	7

Quarterfinals
5	(Germany) V Martinek	7^{7}	6
(France) N van Lottum	6^{5}	4
(Czechoslovakia) K Kroupová	5	6	6
(Germany) K Kschwendt	7	0	4

Semifinals
5	(Germany) V Martinek	2	3
(Czechoslovakia) K Kroupová	6	6
