= 1993 Citroën Cup – Doubles =

Doubles
- 1993 Citroën Cup

Final
- Champions: (China) Li Fang (Belgium) Dominique Monami
- Runners-up: (Croatia) Maja Murić (Czech Republic) Pavlína Rajzlová
- Score: 6–2, 6–1

Details
- Draw: 16 (1WC/1Q)
- Seeds: 4

Events
Singles	Doubles
- WTA Austrian Open

Florencia Labat and Alexia Dechaume were the defending champions, but Dechaume did not compete this year. Labat teamed up with Virginia Ruano Pascual and lost in the first round to Eva Martincová and Sylvia Štefková.

Li Fang and Dominique Monami won the title by defeating Maja Murić and Pavlína Rajzlová 6–2, 6–1 in the final.

== Seeds ==
1. (Italy) Sandra Cecchini / (Italy) Silvia Farina (quarterfinals)
2. (Argentina) Florencia Labat / (Spain) Virginia Ruano Pascual (first round)
3. (Austria) Petra Ritter / (France) Noëlle van Lottum (quarterfinals)
4. (Austria) Sandra Dopfer / (Germany) Maja Živec-Škulj (semifinals)

== Draw ==
Key

- Q = Qualifier
- WC = Wild card
- LL = Lucky loser
- Alt = Alternate
- ITF = ITF entry
- PR = Protected ranking
- SR = Special ranking
- SE = Special exempt
- JE = Junior exempt
- JR = Junior Accelerator Programme entrant
- CO = College Accelerator Programme entrant
- NG = Next Gen Accelerator Program entrant
- w/o = Walkover
- r = Retired
- d = Defaulted

=== Draw ===
First round
1	(Italy) S Cecchini (Italy) S Farina	6	6
(Germany) K Freye (Croatia) M Palaveršić	3	2
(Croatia) M Murić (Czech Republic) P Rajzlová	6	6
(Italy) E Brusati (Netherlands) S Noorlander	4	1
3	(Austria) P Ritter (France) N van Lottum	6	6
(Germany) Ad Barna (Germany) An Barna	1	0
WC	(Austria) S Plischke (Austria) B Schett	4	2
(Finland) N Dahlman (France) A Fusai	6	6
Q	(Croatia) N Ercegović (Germany) S Meier	6	3	6
(Israel) Y Segal (Brazil) A Vieira	2	6	2
(Germany) V Martinek (Austria) M Maruska	2	3
4	(Austria) S Dopfer (Germany) M Živec-Škulj	6	6
(China) F Li (Belgium) D Monami	7	6
(Italy) Giulia Toschi (Switzerland) E Zardo	5	0
(Czech Republic) E Martincová (Czech Republic) S Štefková	7	2	6
2	(Argentina) F Labat (Spain) V Ruano Pascual	5	6	4

Quarterfinals
1	(Italy) S Cecchini (Italy) S Farina	6	5	1
(Croatia) M Murić (Czech Republic) P Rajzlová	4	7	6
3	(Austria) P Ritter (France) N van Lottum	6	3	6^{3}
(Finland) N Dahlman (France) A Fusai	4	6	7^{7}
Q	(Croatia) N Ercegović (Germany) S Meier	5	3
4	(Austria) S Dopfer (Germany) M Živec-Škulj	7	6
(China) F Li (Belgium) D Monami	3	6	7^{7}
(Czech Republic) E Martincová (Czech Republic) S Štefková	6	2	6^{4}

Semifinals
(Croatia) M Murić (Czech Republic) P Rajzlová	6	6
(Finland) N Dahlman (France) A Fusai	3	2
4	(Austria) S Dopfer (Germany) M Živec-Škulj	2	3
(China) F Li (Belgium) D Monami	6	6

Final
(Croatia) M Murić (Czech Republic) P Rajzlová	2	1
(China) F Li (Belgium) D Monami	6	6
