= 1994 BVV Prague Open – Singles =

Singles
- 1994 BVV Prague Open

Final
- Champion: (South Africa) Amanda Coetzer
- Runner-up: (Sweden) Åsa Carlsson
- Score: 6–1, 7–6^{(16–14)}

Details
- Draw: 32 (2WC/4Q/3LL)
- Seeds: 8

Events
Singles	Doubles
- Prague Open

Natalia Medvedeva was the defending champion, but lost in the second round to Silke Frankl

Amanda Coetzer won the title by defeating Åsa Carlsson 6–1, 7–6^{(16–14)} in the final.

== Seeds ==
1. (South Africa) Amanda Coetzer (champion)
2. (Ukraine) Natalia Medvedeva (second round)
3. (United States) Linda Harvey Wild (first round)
4. (Czech Republic) Radka Bobková (first round)
5. (Switzerland) Emanuela Zardo (first round)
6. (Netherlands) Kristie Boogert (first round)
7. (Belgium) ~~Laurence Courtois~~ (withdrew)
8. (Austria) Barbara Schett (quarterfinals)

== Draw ==
Key

- Q = Qualifier
- WC = Wild card
- LL = Lucky loser
- Alt = Alternate
- ITF = ITF entry
- PR = Protected ranking
- SR = Special ranking
- SE = Special exempt
- JE = Junior exempt
- JR = Junior Accelerator Programme entrant
- CO = College Accelerator Programme entrant
- NG = Next Gen Accelerator Program entrant
- w/o = Walkover
- r = Retired
- d = Defaulted

=== Finals ===
Semifinals
1	(South Africa) Amanda Coetzer	7	6
Q	(Argentina) Paola Suárez	5	2
(Sweden) Åsa Carlsson	6	6
(Germany) Silke Frankl	2	1

Final
1	(South Africa) Amanda Coetzer	6	7^{16}
(Sweden) Åsa Carlsson	1	6^{14}

=== Top half ===
First round
1	(South Africa) A Coetzer	6	6
(Czech Republic) E Martincová	3	3
(Slovakia) J Husárová	6	6
WC	(Czech Republic) L Cenková	4	4
(Italy) L Golarsa	6	2	6
Q	(Netherlands) C Wegink	3	6	2
LL	(France) L Ghirardi	6^{4}	2
8	(Austria) B Schett	7^{7}	6
4	(Czech Republic) R Bobková	5	6^{3}
WC	(Czech Republic) L Richterová	7	7^{7}
(Czech Republic) K Kroupová	6	6
(France) N van Lottum	2	1
LL	(Finland) N Dahlman	6	6
(Japan) K Nagatsuka	1	4
Q	(Argentina) P Suárez	6	6
6	(Netherlands) K Boogert	3	3

Second round
1	(South Africa) A Coetzer	6	6
(Slovakia) J Husárová	2	4
(Italy) L Golarsa	5	6	3
8	(Austria) B Schett	7	4	6
WC	(Czech Republic) L Richterová	6	6^{8}	6
(Czech Republic) K Kroupová	2	7^{10}	0
LL	(Finland) N Dahlman	3	4
Q	(Argentina) P Suárez	6	6

Quarterfinals
1	(South Africa) A Coetzer	6	6
8	(Austria) B Schett	3	1
WC	(Czech Republic) L Richterová	3	6	3
Q	(Argentina) P Suárez	6	0	6

Semifinals
1	(South Africa) A Coetzer	7	6
Q	(Argentina) P Suárez	5	2

=== Bottom half ===
First round
5	(Switzerland) E Zardo	2	4
(Romania) R Dragomir	6	6
Q	(Austria) M Maruska	3	6^{4}
(Italy) M Grossi	6	7^{7}
(Germany) P Begerow	6	6
(Australia) M Jaggard-Lai	3	4
(Sweden) Å Carlsson	6	6
3	(United States) L Harvey Wild	4	0
LL	(Czech Republic) J Pospíšilová	6	4	3
(Ukraine) E Brioukhovets	0	6	6
(France) K Quentrec	3	2
(France) A Fusai	6	6
(Germany) S Frankl	6	7^{9}
Q	(France) S Pitkowski	3	6^{7}
(Slovakia) K Habšudová	3	6^{4}
2	(Ukraine) N Medvedeva	6	7^{7}

Second round
(Romania) R Dragomir	6	6
(Italy) M Grossi	1	3
(Germany) P Begerow	3	6	3
(Sweden) Å Carlsson	6	2	6
(Ukraine) E Brioukhovets	0	2
(France) A Fusai	6	6
(Germany) S Frankl	6	6
2	(Ukraine) N Medvedeva	2	3

Quarterfinals
(Romania) R Dragomir	6	5	5
(Sweden) Å Carlsson	4	7	7
(France) A Fusai	4	6^{9}
(Germany) S Frankl	6	7^{11}

Semifinals
(Sweden) Å Carlsson	6	6
(Germany) S Frankl	2	1
