= Prague Open =

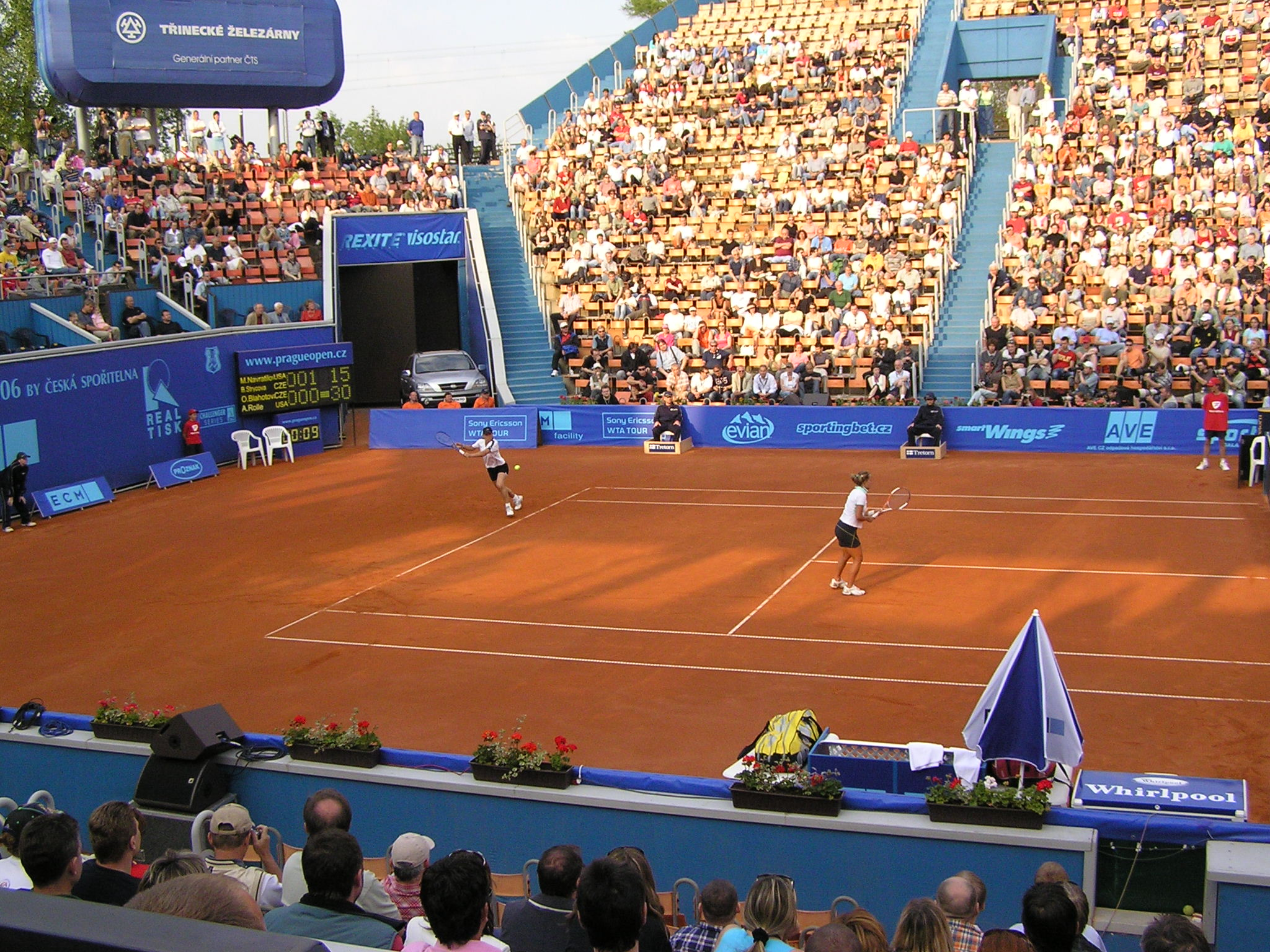
ECM Prague Open 2006

In tennis, Prague Open may refer to:

- Prague Open (1987–1999)
- HTC Prague Open, held only in 1992
- BVV Prague Open (1993–1994)
- Prague Open, an ATP Challenger event, held at I.ČLTK, Prague
- WTA Prague Open, a WTA Tour event, held at I.ČLTK, Prague
- Sparta Prague Open (2000–2023), an ATP Challenger event
