= 1994 BVV Prague Open – Doubles =

Doubles
- 1994 BVV Prague Open

Final
- Champions: (South Africa) Amanda Coetzer (United States) Linda Harvey Wild
- Runners-up: (Netherlands) Kristie Boogert (Italy) Laura Golarsa
- Score: 6–4, 3–6, 6–2

Events
Singles	Doubles
- Prague Open

Inés Gorrochategui and Patricia Tarabini were the defending champions, but none competed this year.

Amanda Coetzer and Linda Harvey Wild won the title by defeating Kristie Boogert and Laura Golarsa 6–4, 3–6, 6–2 in the final.

== Seeds ==
1. (South Africa) Amanda Coetzer / (United States) Linda Harvey Wild (champion)
2. (Netherlands) Kristie Boogert / (Italy) Laura Golarsa (final)
3. (France) Alexandra Fusai / (Slovakia) Karina Habšudová (semifinals)
4. (Netherlands) Ingelise Driehuis / (Australia) Michelle Jaggard-Lai (quarterfinals)

== Draw ==
Key

- Q = Qualifier
- WC = Wild card
- LL = Lucky loser
- Alt = Alternate
- ITF = ITF entry
- PR = Protected ranking
- SR = Special ranking
- SE = Special exempt
- JE = Junior exempt
- JR = Junior Accelerator Programme entrant
- CO = College Accelerator Programme entrant
- NG = Next Gen Accelerator Program entrant
- w/o = Walkover
- r = Retired
- d = Defaulted

=== Draw ===
First round
1	(South Africa) A Coetzer (United States) L Harvey Wild	6	6
(Sweden) Å Carlsson (Finland) N Dahlman	2	2
(Czech Republic) P Holubová (Slovakia) J Husárová	6	6
(Czech Republic) J Pospíšilová (Czech Republic) S Štefková	3	2
3	(France) A Fusai (Slovakia) K Habšudová	6	6
(Romania) R Dragomir (France) N van Lottum	3	3
(United States) S Gilchrist (United States) V Paynter	6	4	6
(Ukraine) E Brioukhovets (Japan) K Nagatsuka	4	6	4
(Sweden) M Lindström (Sweden) M Strandlund	7	7
(Czech Republic) R Bobková (Czech Republic) E Martincová	5	5
(Germany) V Martinek (Switzerland) E Zardo	3	3
4	(Netherlands) I Driehuis (Australia) M Jaggard-Lai	6	6
(United States) L Glitz (France) K Quentrec	4	4
Q	(South Africa) J Kruger (Netherlands) C Wegink	6	6
WC	(Czech Republic) K Kroupová (Czech Republic) L Richterová	2	0
2	(Netherlands) K Boogert (Italy) L Golarsa	6	6

Quarterfinals
1	(South Africa) A Coetzer (United States) L Harvey Wild	6	6
(Czech Republic) P Holubová (Slovakia) J Husárová	3	3
3	(France) A Fusai (Slovakia) K Habšudová	5	6	7^{7}
(United States) S Gilchrist (United States) V Paynter	7	2	6^{2}
(Sweden) M Lindström (Sweden) M Strandlund	6	2	6
4	(Netherlands) I Driehuis (Australia) M Jaggard-Lai	4	6	3
Q	(South Africa) J Kruger (Netherlands) C Wegink	d
2	(Netherlands) K Boogert (Italy) L Golarsa

Semifinals
1	(South Africa) A Coetzer (United States) L Harvey Wild	6	6^{5}	6
3	(France) A Fusai (Slovakia) K Habšudová	1	7^{7}	3
(Sweden) M Lindström (Sweden) M Strandlund	2	5
2	(Netherlands) K Boogert (Italy) L Golarsa	6	7

Final
1	(South Africa) A Coetzer (United States) L Harvey Wild	6	3	6
2	(Netherlands) K Boogert (Italy) L Golarsa	4	6	2
