= 2011 Allianz Cup – Singles =

Singles
- 2011 Allianz Cup

Final
- Champion: (Spain) Silvia Soler-Espinosa
- Runner-up: (Italy) Romina Oprandi
- Score: 2–6, 6–6, ret.

Events
Singles	Doubles
← 2010 ·	Allianz Cup	· 2012 →

Mathilde Johansson was the defending champion, but lost in the semifinals to Romina Oprandi.
Silvia Soler-Espinosa won the title by defeating Romina Oprandi in the final 2–6, 6–6, ret.

== Seeds ==
1. (Sweden) Johanna Larsson (quarterfinals)
2. (France) Mathilde Johansson (semifinals)
3. (Spain) Laura Pous Tió (first round)
4. (France) Alizé Cornet (quarterfinals)
5. (Italy) Romina Oprandi (final, retired)
6. (Spain) Silvia Soler Espinosa (champion)
7. (Romania) Alexandra Cadanțu (semifinals)
8. (Russia) Nina Bratchikova (first round)

== Main draw ==
=== Key ===
- Q = Qualifier
- WC = Wild card
- LL = Lucky loser
- Alt = Alternate
- SE = Special exempt
- PR = Protected ranking
- ITF = ITF entry
- JE = Junior exempt
- w/o = Walkover
- r = Retired
- d = Defaulted
- SR = Special ranking

=== Finals ===
Semifinals
6	(Spain) Silvia Soler-Espinosa	4	6	6
7	(Romania) Alexandra Cadanțu	6	4	2
5	(Italy) Romina Oprandi	6^{6}	6	6
2	(France) Mathilde Johansson	7^{8}	1	2

Final
6	(Spain) Silvia Soler-Espinosa	2	6
5	(Italy) Romina Oprandi	6	6^{r}

=== Top half ===
First round
1	(Sweden) J Larsson	6	3	6
(Germany) N Zander	3	6	2
Q	(Bulgaria) I Shinikova	6	6
(Slovenia) T Majerič	3	3
LL	(Hungary) V Bulgakova	2	6	2
(Colombia) C Castaño	6	4	6
(Spain) L Costas-Moreira	2	3
6	(Spain) S Soler-Espinosa	6	6
3	(Spain) L Pous Tió	4	3
(Switzerland) S Vögele	6	6
(Colombia) M Duque	6	6
(Slovakia) K Kučová	3	2
Q	(Czech Republic) D Allertová	2	0
(Canada) S Fichman	6	6
(Spain) E Cabeza Candela	4	4
7	(Romania) A Cadanțu	6	6

Second round
1	(Sweden) J Larsson	6	7
Q	(Bulgaria) I Shinikova	1	5
(Colombia) C Castaño	0	2
6	(Spain) S Soler-Espinosa	6	6
(Switzerland) S Vögele	4	6	2
(Colombia) M Duque	6	4	6
(Canada) S Fichman	3	5
7	(Romania) A Cadanțu	6	7

Quarterfinals
1	(Sweden) J Larsson	2	2
6	(Spain) S Soler-Espinosa	6	6
(Colombia) M Duque	4	5
7	(Romania) A Cadanțu	6	7

Semifinals
6	(Spain) S Soler-Espinosa	4	6	6
7	(Romania) A Cadanțu	6	4	2

=== Bottom half ===
First round
5	(Italy) R Oprandi	6	6
WC	(Bulgaria) V Tomova	3	2
(Slovakia) L Wienerová	2	6	6
(Spain) L Arruabarrena-Vecino	6	0	0
Q	(Romania) IR Olaru	7	3	7
(Kazakhstan) S Karatantcheva	5	6	5
WC	(Germany) H Dishkova	1	2
4	(France) A Cornet	6	6
8	(Russia) N Bratchikova	3	1
Q	(Romania) C Mitu	6	6
(Turkey) Ç Büyükakçay	6	6
WC	(Bulgaria) A Vangelova	0	1
WC	(Bulgaria) R Dimitrova	1	4
(Romania) E Bogdan	6	6
(Bulgaria) E Kostova	6	5	3
2	(France) M Johansson	4	7	6

Second round
5	(Italy) R Oprandi	2	6	6
(Slovakia) L Wienerová	6	2	2
Q	(Romania) IR Olaru	2	6	2
4	(France) A Cornet	6	2	6
Q	(Romania) C Mitu	6	6
(Turkey) Ç Büyükakçay	0	3
(Romania) E Bogdan	0	3
2	(France) M Johansson	6	6

Quarterfinals
5	(Italy) R Oprandi	6^{3}	7	6
4	(France) A Cornet	7^{7}	5	0
Q	(Romania) C Mitu	3	2
2	(France) M Johansson	6	6

Semifinals
5	(Italy) R Oprandi	6^{6}	6	6
2	(France) M Johansson	7^{8}	1	2
