= 1994 Styrian Open – Singles =

Singles
- 1994 Styrian Open

Final
- Champion: (Germany) Anke Huber
- Runner-up: (Austria) Judith Wiesner
- Score: 6–3, 6–3

Details
- Draw: 32 (2WC/4Q)
- Seeds: 8

Events
Singles	Doubles
- WTA Austrian Open

Anke Huber successfully defended her title by defeating Judith Wiesner 6–3, 6–3 in the final.

== Seeds ==
1. (Germany) Anke Huber (champion)
2. (Austria) Judith Wiesner (final)
3. (Germany) Barbara Rittner (quarterfinals, retired)
4. (Italy) Sandra Cecchini (semifinals)
5. (Slovakia) Karina Habšudová (quarterfinals)
6. (Italy) Linda Ferrando (first round)
7. (Italy) Silvia Farina (semifinals)
8. (Austria) Petra Ritter (quarterfinals)

== Draw ==
Key

- Q = Qualifier
- WC = Wild card
- LL = Lucky loser
- Alt = Alternate
- ITF = ITF entry
- PR = Protected ranking
- SR = Special ranking
- SE = Special exempt
- JE = Junior exempt
- JR = Junior Accelerator Programme entrant
- CO = College Accelerator Programme entrant
- NG = Next Gen Accelerator Program entrant
- w/o = Walkover
- r = Retired
- d = Defaulted

=== Finals ===
Semifinals
1	(Germany) Anke Huber	6	7^{7}
4	(Italy) Sandra Cecchini	3	6^{2}
7	(Italy) Silvia Farina	4	3
2	(Austria) Judith Wiesner	6	6

Final
1	(Germany) Anke Huber	6	6
2	(Austria) Judith Wiesner	3	3

=== Top half ===
First round
1	(Germany) A Huber	7	6
(Germany) S Meier	5	2
(Czech Republic) R Bobková	6	4	7^{7}
(Soviet Union) E Brioukhovets	4	6	6^{5}
Q	(Spain) M Sánchez Lorenzo	6	3	7
Q	(Bulgaria) E Wagner	4	6	5
(Austria) B Schett	6	6
6	(Italy) L Ferrando	4	4
4	(Italy) S Cecchini	1	6	6
Q	(Italy) F Bonsignori	6	2	4
(Austria) S Dopfer	4	6^{9}
(France) A Fusai	6	7^{11}
(Slovakia) K Studeníková	6	3	5
(France) N van Lottum	2	6	7
(Russia) E Maniokova	2	3
8	(Austria) P Ritter	6	6

Second round
1	(Germany) A Huber	6	6
(Czech Republic) R Bobková	2	1
Q	(Spain) M Sánchez Lorenzo	4	7	6
(Austria) B Schett	6	5	4
4	(Italy) S Cecchini	6	6^{1}	6
(France) A Fusai	4	7^{7}	1
(France) N van Lottum	5	2
8	(Austria) P Ritter	7	6

Quarterfinals
1	(Germany) A Huber	7	6
Q	(Spain) M Sánchez Lorenzo	5	2
4	(Italy) S Cecchini	6	5	6
8	(Austria) P Ritter	2	7	0

Semifinals
1	(Germany) A Huber	6	7^{7}
4	(Italy) S Cecchini	3	6^{2}

=== Bottom half ===
First round
7	(Italy) S Farina	6^{6}	6	6
(Italy) M Grossi	7^{8}	2	4
Q	(Germany) J Kandarr	6	4	6
(Germany) V Martinek	3	6	2
(Czech Republic) L Richterová	6	6
WC	(Austria) E Fauth	3	3
WC	(Austria) S Plischke	2	0
3	(Germany) B Rittner	6	6
5	(Slovakia) K Habšudová	6	6
(Slovakia) J Husárová	2	4
(Germany) S Frankl	6	6
(Spain) Á Montolio	4	4
(Spain) C Torrens Valero	5	6	6
(Argentina) P Tarabini	7	2	4
(Argentina) B Fulco	6^{4}	3
2	(Austria) J Wiesner	7^{7}	6

Second round
7	(Italy) S Farina	6	2
Q	(Germany) J Kandarr	3	0^{r}
(Czech Republic) L Richterová	7^{7}	0	1
3	(Germany) B Rittner	6^{4}	6	6
5	(Slovakia) K Habšudová	6	6
(Germany) S Frankl	4	2
(Spain) C Torrens Valero	2	0
2	(Austria) J Wiesner	6	6

Quarterfinals
7	(Italy) S Farina	6
3	(Germany) B Rittner	3	r
5	(Slovakia) K Habšudová	1	5
2	(Austria) J Wiesner	6	7

Semifinals
7	(Italy) S Farina	4	3
2	(Austria) J Wiesner	6	6
