= 2011 Allianz Cup – Doubles =

Doubles
- 2011 Allianz Cup

Final
- Champions: (Russia) Nina Bratchikova (Croatia) Darija Jurak
- Runners-up: (Romania) Alexandra Cadanțu (Romania) Ioana Raluca Olaru
- Score: 6–4, 7–5

Events
Singles	Doubles
← 2010 ·	Allianz Cup	· 2012 →

Eleni Daniilidou and Jasmin Wöhr were the defending champions, but both chose not to participate.
Nina Bratchikova and Darija Jurak won the title, defeating Alexandra Cadanțu and Ioana Raluca Olaru 6–4, 7–5 in the final.

== Seeds ==
1. (Russia) Nina Bratchikova / (Croatia) Darija Jurak (champions)
2. (France) Alizé Cornet / (Turkey) İpek Şenoğlu (first round)
3. (Canada) Sharon Fichman / (Spain) Laura Pous Tió (quarterfinals, withdrew)
4. (Romania) Elena Bogdan / (Switzerland) Stefanie Vögele (first round)

== Draw ==
=== Key ===
- Q = Qualifier
- WC = Wild card
- LL = Lucky loser
- Alt = Alternate
- SE = Special exempt
- PR = Protected ranking
- ITF = ITF entry
- JE = Junior exempt
- w/o = Walkover
- r = Retired
- d = Defaulted
- SR = Special ranking

=== Draw ===
First round
1	(Russia) N Bratchikova (Croatia) D Jurak	6	6
(Romania) C Hristea (Romania) I-A Iova	3	4
WC	(Bulgaria) I Shinikova (Bulgaria) V Tomova	5	6	[6]
(Bulgaria) E Kostova (Bulgaria) B Pawlowa-Dimitrova	7	2	[10]
4	(Romania) E Bogdan (Switzerland) S Vögele	0	6	[8]
(Colombia) C Castaño (Spain) L Costas-Moreira	6	1	[10]
WC	(Bulgaria) N Hristova (Bulgaria) A Vangelova	0	5
(Kazakhstan) S Karatantcheva (Italy) R Oprandi	6	7
(Romania) A Cadanțu (Romania) IR Olaru	0	6	[10]
(Hungary) V Bulgakova (Slovakia) K Kučová	6	3	[2]
(Turkey) Ç Büyükakçay (Slovakia) L Wienerová	2	5
3	(Canada) S Fichman (Spain) L Pous Tió	6	7
(Belgium) M Boev (Bulgaria) J Terziyska	7^{7}	6
WC	(Bulgaria) R Dimitrova (Bulgaria) E Jetcheva	6^{3}	3
(Spain) L Arruabarrena-Vecino (Spain) E Cabeza Candela	6	6
2	(France) A Cornet (Turkey) İ Şenoğlu	3	1

Quarterfinals
1	(Russia) N Bratchikova (Croatia) D Jurak	6	6
(Bulgaria) E Kostova (Bulgaria) B Pawlowa-Dimitrova	2	1
(Colombia) C Castaño (Spain) L Costas-Moreira	4	5
(Kazakhstan) S Karatantcheva (Italy) R Oprandi	6	7
(Romania) A Cadanțu (Romania) IR Olaru	w/o
3	(Canada) S Fichman (Spain) L Pous Tió
(Belgium) M Boev (Bulgaria) J Terziyska	2	2
(Spain) L Arruabarrena-Vecino (Spain) E Cabeza Candela	6	6

Semifinals
1	(Russia) N Bratchikova (Croatia) D Jurak	6	5	[11]
(Kazakhstan) S Karatantcheva (Italy) R Oprandi	4	7	[9]
(Romania) A Cadanțu (Romania) IR Olaru	6	6
(Spain) L Arruabarrena-Vecino (Spain) E Cabeza Candela	2	1

Finals
1	(Russia) N Bratchikova (Croatia) D Jurak	6	7
(Romania) A Cadanțu (Romania) IR Olaru	4	5
