= Alena Havrlíková =

Czech tennis player

- Full name: Alena Havrlíková Perůtková
- Country (sports): Czechoslovakia; Czech Republic
- Born: 13 June 1977 (age 47)
- Prize money: $16,449

Singles
- Career record: 52–38
- Career titles: 2 ITF
- Highest ranking: No. 298 (17 May 1993)

Doubles
- Career record: 30–26
- Career titles: 1 ITF
- Highest ranking: No. 243 (2 October 1995)

Alena Havrlíková (born 13 June 1977) is a Czech former professional tennis player.

Havrlíková, a European No. 1 in junior tennis, played on the professional tour during the 1990s and had a career-high singles ranking of 298 in the world, winning two ITF titles. Her only WTA Tour singles main draw appearance came as a wildcard at the 1993 Prague Open, where she lost in the first round to Inés Gorrochategui.

== ITF finals ==
=== Singles: 3 (2–1) ===
Result	No.	Date	Tournament	Surface	Opponent	Score
Win	1.	12 July 1992	ITF Velp, Netherlands	Clay	(Australia) Shareen Bottrell	6–2, 6–2
Win	2.	1 September 1992	ITF Bad Nauheim, Germany	Clay	(Germany) Renata Kochta	3–6, 6–2, 6–4
Loss	1.	3 September 1995	ITF Bad Nauheim, Germany	Clay	(Bulgaria) Pavlina Nola	6–3, 3–6, 4–6

=== Doubles: 4 (1–3) ===
Result	No.	Date	Tournament	Surface	Partner	Opponents	Score
Loss	1.	27 October 1991	ITF Flensburg, Germany	Carpet (i)	(Czechoslovakia) Ivana Havrlíková	(Belgium) Laurence Courtois (Belgium) Nancy Feber	2–6, 3–6
Loss	2.	2 May 1993	ITF Acapulco, Mexico	Clay	(Hungary) Petra Gáspár	(South Africa) Rene Mentz (United States) Claire Sessions Bailey	1–6, 3–6
Win	1.	27 August 1995	ITF Valašské Meziříčí, Czech Republic	Clay	(Czech Republic) Jana Lubasová	(Czech Republic) Olga Blahotová (Czech Republic) Jana Macurová	7–6^{(2)}, 6–3
Loss	3.	24 September 1995	ITF Cluj, Romania	Clay	(Czech Republic) Olga Blahotová	(Czech Republic) Gabriela Chmelinová (Czech Republic) Sabine Radevicová	3–6, 6–3, 2–6
