= Allianz Cup =

ITF Women's Tour
- Event name: Sofia
- Location: Sofia, Bulgaria
- Venue: TC Levski Sofia
- Category: ITF Women's Circuit
- Surface: Clay
- Draw: 32S/32Q/16D
- Prize money: $25,000
- Website: Official website

The Allianz Cup was a tournament for professional female tennis players. The event, played on outdoor clay courts, was classified as a $25,000 ITF Women's Circuit tournament in its final year and was held in Sofia, Bulgaria. It was a $100,000 event for four years in a row until it was downgraded in 2012. The first edition was held in 1991.

== Past finals ==
=== Singles ===
Year	Champion	Runner-up	Score
2018	(Austria) Barbara Haas	(Germany) Katharina Hobgarski	6–3, 6–2
2017	(Bulgaria) Viktoriya Tomova	(Italy) Jessica Pieri	7–6^{(9–7)}, 4–6, 6–3
2016	(Russia) Viktoria Kamenskaya	(Bulgaria) Viktoriya Tomova	6–4, 6–7^{(5–7)}, 6–0
2015	(Romania) Ana Bogdan	(Russia) Viktoria Kamenskaya	6–2, 3–6, 7–5
2014	(Romania) Andreea Mitu	(Russia) Victoria Kan	6–4, 4–6, 6–3
2013	(Austria) Patricia Mayr-Achleitner	(Slovakia) Kristína Kučová	6–2, 1–6, 6–3
2012	(Romania) Andreea Mitu	(Canada) Sharon Fichman	6–4, 3–6, 6–3
2011	(Spain) Sílvia Soler Espinosa	(Italy) Romina Oprandi	2–6, 6–6 ret.
2010	(France) Mathilde Johansson	(Spain) Carla Suárez Navarro	6–4, 3–1 ret.
2009	(Romania) Alexandra Dulgheru	(Italy) Tathiana Garbin	6–7^{(4–7)}, 7–5, 6–1
2008	(Spain) Nuria Llagostera Vives	(Bulgaria) Tsvetana Pironkova	6–2, 6–3
2007	(Montenegro) Danica Krstajić	(Romania) Magda Mihalache	3–6, 6–2, 6–2
2006	(Germany) Andrea Petkovic	(Romania) Simona Matei	7–5, 7–5
2005	(Austria) Tamira Paszek	(Germany) Kristina Barrois	7–6^{(7–5)}, 6–3
2004	(Hungary) Virág Németh	(Slovakia) Zuzana Kučová	5–1 ret.
2003	(France) Séverine Beltrame	(Austria) Patricia Wartusch	6–3, 6–4
2002	(Georgia (country)) Margalita Chakhnashvili	(Bulgaria) Desislava Topalova	6–3, 4–6, 6–0
2001	(Czech Republic) Olga Blahotová	(Russia) Maria Goloviznina	7–6^{(7–3)}, 6–4
2000	(Bulgaria) Antoaneta Pandjerova	(Austria) Evelyn Fauth	7–5, 6–4
1999	(Spain) Marta Marrero	(Bulgaria) Lubomira Bacheva	6–2, 6–3
1998	(Bulgaria) Desislava Topalova	(Belarus) Nadejda Ostrovskaya	6–4, 4–6, 6–2
1997	(Spain) Ana Alcazar	(Bulgaria) Pavlina Stoyanova	2–6, 6–3, 6–1
1996	(Czech Republic) Lenka Němečková	(Italy) Francesca Romano	6–2, 6–3
1995	(Switzerland) Emanuela Zardo	(Czech Republic) Ivana Havrlíková	6–2, 6–3
1994	(Czech Republic) Kateřina Kroupová-Šišková	(Portugal) Sofia Prazeres	6–3, 6–3
1993	(Belgium) Laurence Courtois	(Bulgaria) Svetlana Krivencheva	6–1, 6–1
1992	(Germany) Heike Rusch	(Netherlands) Sandra van der Aa	6–3, 4–6, 6–3
1991	(Netherlands) Monique Kiene	(Germany) Meike Babel	7–5, 6–3

=== Doubles ===
Year	Champions	Runners-up	Score
2018	(France) Manon Arcangioli (Belgium) Marie Benoît	(Russia) Amina Anshba (Russia) Polina Monova	6–4, 7–6^{(7–5)}
2017	(Romania) Jaqueline Cristian (Russia) Anastasiya Komardina	(Greece) Valentini Grammatikopoulou (Romania) Elena-Gabriela Ruse	6–3, 6–0
2016	(Greece) Valentini Grammatikopoulou (Netherlands) Quirine Lemoine	(North Macedonia) Lina Gjorcheska (Bulgaria) Viktoriya Tomova	6–4, 4–6, [10–6]
2015	(Georgia (country)) Sofia Shapatava (Ukraine) Anastasiya Vasylyeva	(Bulgaria) Elitsa Kostova (Czech Republic) Kateřina Kramperová	6–2, 6–2
2014	(North Macedonia) Lina Gjorcheska (Greece) Despina Papamichail	(Slovakia) Rebecca Šramková (Bulgaria) Julia Terziyska	6–1, 6–4
2013	(Bulgaria) Dia Evtimova (Bulgaria) Viktoriya Tomova	(Spain) Beatriz García Vidagany (Hungary) Réka-Luca Jani	6–4, 2–6, [10–6]
2012	(Poland) Katarzyna Piter (Poland) Barbara Sobaszkiewicz	(Russia) Marina Melnikova (Romania) Raluca Olaru	7–5, 6–1
2011	(Russia) Nina Bratchikova (Croatia) Darija Jurak	(Romania) Alexandra Cadanțu (Romania) Ioana Raluca Olaru	6–4, 7–5
2010	(Greece) Eleni Daniilidou (Germany) Jasmin Wöhr	(Austria) Sandra Klemenschits (Germany) Tatjana Malek	6–3, 6–4
2009	(Switzerland) Timea Bacsinszky (Italy) Tathiana Garbin	(Slovenia) Polona Hercog (Croatia) Petra Martić	6–2, 7–6^{(7–4)}
2008	(Estonia) Maret Ani (Czech Republic) Renata Voráčová	(Spain) Lourdes Domínguez Lino (Spain) Arantxa Parra Santonja	7–6^{(7–4)}, 7–6^{(11–9)}
2007	(Romania) Mihaela Buzărnescu (Poland) Magdalena Kiszczyńska	(Brazil) Joana Cortez (Brazil) Teliana Pereira	6–4, 6–7^{(2–7)}, [10–4]
2006	(Croatia) Matea Mezak (Croatia) Nika Ožegović	(Serbia and Montenegro) Danica Krstajić (Slovenia) Maša Zec Peškirič	6–4, 6–3
2005	(Croatia) Sanja Ančić (Austria) Tamira Paszek	(Brazil) Joana Cortez (Poland) Karolina Kosińska	6–7^{(9–11)}, 6–2, 6–4
2004	(Hungary) Kira Nagy (Hungary) Virág Németh	(Romania) Gabriela Niculescu (Czech Republic) Sandra Záhlavová	2–6, 6–2, 7–5
2003	(Bulgaria) Desislava Topalova (Serbia and Montenegro) Dragana Zarić	(Austria) Daniela Klemenschits (Austria) Sandra Klemenschits	6–3, 7–5
2002	(Russia) Vera Dushevina (Russia) Galina Voskoboeva	(Italy) Laura Dell'Angelo (Italy) Nathalie Viérin	3–6, 6–4, 6–2
2001	(Czech Republic) Olga Blahotová (Czech Republic) Magdalena Zděnovcová	(Ukraine) Olena Antypina (Ukraine) Yuliana Fedak	6–3, 6–3
2000	(Bulgaria) Antoaneta Pandjerova (Bulgaria) Desislava Topalova	(Netherlands) Natalia Galouza (New Zealand) Shelley Stephens	6–1, 7–6^{(7–4)}
1999	(Spain) Rosa María Andrés Rodríguez (Spain) Conchita Martínez Granados	(Hungary) Katalin Marosi (Belarus) Nadejda Ostrovskaya	walkover
1998	(Bulgaria) Lubomira Bacheva (Netherlands) Maaike Koutstaal	(Romania) Magda Mihalache (Slovakia) Zuzana Váleková	6–1, 7–5
1997	(Germany) Sandra Klösel (Austria) Karin Kschwendt	(Serbia and Montenegro) Sandra Načuk (Serbia and Montenegro) Dragana Zarić	6–4, 6–4
1996	(Argentina) Laura Montalvo (Czech Republic) Lenka Němečková	(Bulgaria) Teodora Nedeva (Bulgaria) Antoaneta Pandjerova	6–2, 6–0
1995	(Argentina) Geraldine Aizenberg (Argentina) Laura Montalvo	(Bulgaria) Lubomira Bacheva (Hungary) Réka Vidáts	6–2, 6–2
1994	(Germany) Caroline Schneider (Poland) Katarzyna Teodorowicz	(Czech Republic) Petra Kučová (Czech Republic) Kateřina Kroupová-Šišková	6–1, 6–1
1993	(Bulgaria) Galia Angelova (Bulgaria) Lubomira Bacheva	(Slovakia) Patrícia Marková (Australia) Kirrily Sharpe	6–0, 7–5
1992	(Commonwealth of Independent States) Karina Kuregian (Australia) Kirrily Sharpe	(Bulgaria) Galia Angelova (Bulgaria) Lubomira Bacheva	7–6, 6–2
1991	(Germany) Meike Babel (United Kingdom) Valda Lake	(Czech Republic) Ivana Havrlíková (Czech Republic) Kateřina Kroupová-Šišková	7–5, 6–0
