= Sílvia Soler Espinosa =

Spanish tennis player (born 1987)

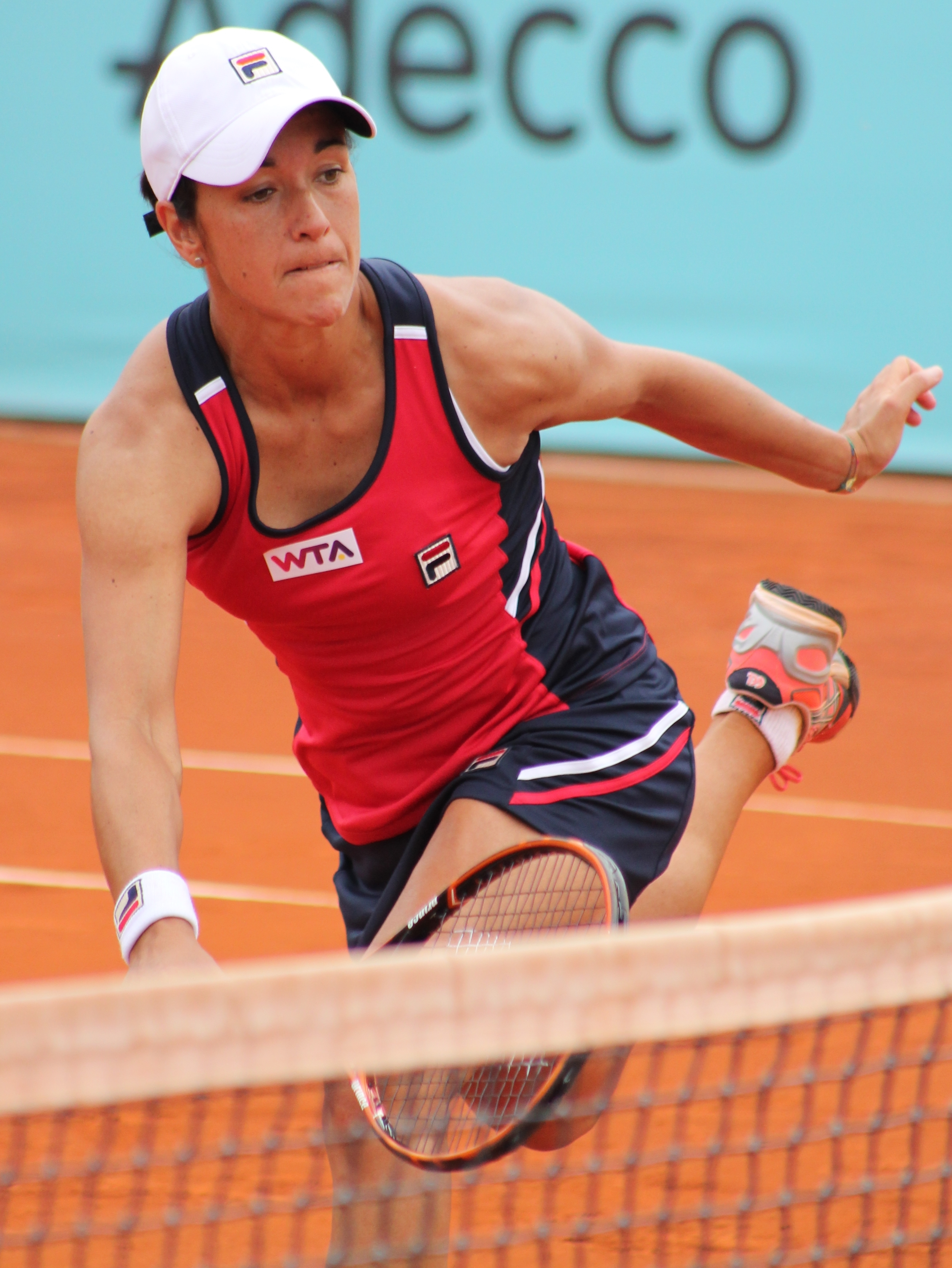
- Soler Espinosa at the 2014 Madrid Open
- Country (sports): Spain
- Born: 19 November 1987 (age 38) Elche, Spain
- Height: 1.69 m (5 ft 7 in)
- Turned pro: 2003
- Retired: 2020
- Plays: Right-handed (two-handed backhand)
- Prize money: $2,108,331

Singles
- Career record: 418–386
- Career titles: 5 ITF
- Highest ranking: No. 54 (21 May 2012)

Grand Slam singles results
- Australian Open: 2R (2015)
- French Open: 3R (2014)
- Wimbledon: 2R (2012, 2013, 2014, 2015)
- US Open: 3R (2011, 2012)

Other tournaments
- Olympic Games: 1R (2012)

Doubles
- Career record: 129–148
- Career titles: 1 WTA, 2 ITF
- Highest ranking: No. 39 (28 April 2014)

Grand Slam doubles results
- Australian Open: QF (2013, 2014)
- French Open: QF (2015)
- Wimbledon: 3R (2013)
- US Open: 2R (2012)

Team competitions
- Fed Cup: 4–11

Sílvia Soler Espinosa (Spanish pronunciation: [ˈsilβja soˈleɾ espiˈnosa]; born 19 November 1987) is a retired Spanish tennis player.

In her career, she won one doubles title on the WTA Tour, as well as five singles and two doubles titles on the ITF Women's Circuit. On 21 May 2012, she reached her best singles ranking of world No. 54. On 28 April 2014, she peaked at No. 39 in the doubles rankings.

Playing for Spain in Fed Cup, Soler Espinosa has a win–loss record of 4–11.

== Personal life and background ==
Soler Espinosa is coached by Jerome Adamec. Her father works in a factory, while her mother is a housewife. She stated that her favourite court is clay. Silvia cited Steffi Graf as one of her biggest tennis idols.

== Tennis career ==
=== Junior years ===
In 2002, Soler Espinosa made her debut on the ITF Junior Circuit at the age of 14. That year, she won her first ITF junior title in doubles, at the International Madrid, together with Astrid Waernes-Garcia. In September 2003, she won her first singles title at Torneo ITF Junior "Ciudad de Castro Urdiales". Later that year, she achieved her junior highest-ranking in singles at No. 158. On the Junior Circuit, she won three titles in singles, and two titles in doubles.

=== ITF Women's Circuit ===
Soler Espinosa debuted on ITF Circuit in May 2003 at Almeria, Spain, where she was defeated Lauren Cheung in the first round. In 2007, she won her first ITF single title, at a $25k event in Sintra, Portugal. There, she defeated Dutch player Romana Janshen in two tiebreakers. In 2011, she played and won her first major ITF final, at the 2011 Allianz Cup in Sofia, Bulgaria. On the ITF Circuit, she won five singles and two doubles titles.

=== WTA Tour ===
In April 2009, Silver Espinosa made her first WTA Tour main-draw appearance at Andalucia Tennis Experience, Marbella, Spain. She lost in the first round to Kaia Kanepi. Silvia failed to qualify at all four Grand Slam tournaments.

==== 2011: First major main draw; entering top 100 ====
Soler Espinosa had her first Grand Slam tournament main-draw appearance at the French Open, and recorded her first major match win. In the second round, she was stopped by Chinese top player Li Na. At Wimbledon, she failed to qualify in the final round. At the US Open, she won two main-draw matches, before she was stopped by Carla Suárez Navarro, in straight sets. On 19 September, she entered the top 100, reaching world No. 90.

==== 2012: Premier Mandatory and Premier 5 main-draw debut & Olympic Games ====
Silvia started season at the Sydney International, where she failed in qualifying. After that, she lost in the first round of the Australian Open. In February, she recorded two losses against Russia Fed Cup team, losing to Maria Sharapova and Svetlana Kuznetsova, respectively.

In March 2012, she made her first Premier Mandatory appearance, at the Indian Wells Open. She lost in the second round against Roberta Vinci. In Miami, she went one step further, and advanced to round three, in which she was stopped by Agnieszka Radwańska.

In April 2012, she again played with Fed Cup team and scored of 1–1 against Slovakia.

In May, Soler Espinosa made her first match win at the Madrid Open. She was stopped by Li Na in the second round. She also made the second round at the Italian Open.

At Wimbledon, she reached the second round but then was stopped by Vera Zvonareva, in three sets. Soler Espinosa also reached the second round of the Swedish Open in Båstad, before losing to Anastasia Pavlyuchenkova in straight sets.

In August 2012, Silvia made her first appearance at the Olympic Games, playing for Spain, but she was defeated in the first round by Heather Watson.

Second year in row, she made third round at the US Open.

==== 2013: Major QF and Premier Mandatory SF in doubles ====
In doubles, she reached quarterfinals at the Australian Open, together with Carla Suárez Navarro. They were stopped by Russian pair of Ekaterina Makarova and Elena Vesnina. Together with Suárez Navarro, Silvia made another great result, reaching semifinals at the Madrid Open.

In doubles, she reached No. 59, on 8 July 2013.

== Performance timelines ==
Key
W	F	SF	QF	#R	RR	Q#	P#	DNQ	A	Z#	PO	G	S	B	NMS	NTI	P	NH

(W) winner; (F) finalist; (SF) semifinalist; (QF) quarterfinalist; (#R) rounds 4, 3, 2, 1; (RR) round-robin stage; (Q#) qualification round; (P#) preliminary round; (DNQ) did not qualify; (A) absent; (Z#) Davis/Fed Cup Zonal Group (with number indication) or (PO) play-off; (G) gold, (S) silver or (B) bronze Olympic/Paralympic medal; (NMS) not a Masters tournament; (NTI) not a Tier I tournament; (P) postponed; (NH) not held; (SR) strike rate (events won / competed); (W–L) win–loss record.

=== Singles ===
Tournament	2008	2009	2010	2011	2012	2013	2014	2015	2016	2017	2018	2019	2020	SR	W–L
Grand Slam tournaments
Australian Open	A	Q2	Q1	Q1	1R	1R	1R	2R	A	Q1	Q2	Q1	A	0 / 4	1–4
French Open	A	Q1	Q2	2R	A	2R	3R	2R	1R	Q1	A	A	A	0 / 5	5–5
Wimbledon	A	Q2	Q1	Q3	2R	2R	2R	2R	Q1	A	Q1	A	NH	0 / 4	4–4
US Open	Q1	Q1	Q2	3R	3R	1R	1R	Q2	A	Q1	Q2	A	A	0 / 4	4–4
Win–loss	0–0	0–0	0–0	3–2	3–3	2–4	3–4	3–3	0–1	0–0	0–0	0–0	0–0	0 / 17	14–17
National representation
Summer Olympics	A	NH			1R	NH			A	NH			P	0 / 1	0–1
Premier Mandatory & 5
Dubai / Qatar Open (Note: The first Premier 5 event of the year has switched back and forth between the Dubai Tennis Championships and the Qatar Ladies Open since 2009. Dubai was classified as a Premier 5 event from 2009 to 2011 before being succeeded by Doha for the 2012–2014 period. In 2015, Dubai regained its Premier 5 status while Doha was demoted to Premier status. The Premier 5 tournaments were reclassified as WTA 1000 tournaments in 2021.)	A	A	A	A	A	A	A	A	A	1R	A	A	A	0 / 1	0–1
Indian Wells Open	A	A	A	A	2R	2R	2R	1R	A	A	A	A	P	0 / 4	3–4
Miami Open	A	A	A	A	3R	2R	1R	1R	A	Q1	A	A	P	0 / 4	3–4
Madrid Open	NH	A	A	A	2R	1R	1R	1R	Q1	Q2	1R	A	P	0 / 5	1–5
Italian Open	A	A	A	A	2R	Q2	A	Q2	A	A	A	A	P	0 / 1	1–1
Canadian Open	A	A	A	A	A	Q1	A	A	A	A	A	A		0 / 0	0–0
Cincinnati Open	NMS	A	A	A	Q1	Q1	Q2	A	A	A	A	A		0 / 0	0–0
Pan Pacific / Wuhan Open (Note: In 2014, the Pan Pacific Open was downgraded to a Premier event and replaced by the Wuhan Open. The Premier 5 tournaments were reclassified as WTA 1000 tournaments in 2021.)	A	A	A	A	1R	Q2	Q2	A	A	A	A	A		0 / 1	0–1
China Open	NMS	A	A	A	Q1	1R	1R	A	A	A	A	A		0 / 2	0–2
Career statistics
	2008	2009	2010	2011	2012	2013	2014	2015	2016	2017	2018	2019	2020	SR	W–L
Year-end ranking	187	183	170	82	83	82	68	142	128	223	177	656		$2,108,331	

=== Doubles ===
Tournament	2012	2013	2014	2015	2016	2017	2018	2019	2020	W–L
Australian Open	2R	QF	QF	3R	1R	A	A	A	A	9–5
French Open	A	1R	1R	QF	A	A	A	A	A	3–3
Wimbledon	A	3R	1R	1R	A	A	A	A	NH	2–3
US Open	2R	1R	1R	1R	A	A	A	A	A	1–4
Win–loss	2–2	5–4	3–4	5–4	0–1	0–0	0–0	0–0	0–0	15–15

== WTA Tour finals ==
=== Singles: 2 (2 runner-ups) ===
Legend International (0–2)	Finals by surface Clay (0–2)

Result	W–L	Date	Tournament	Tier	Surface	Opponent	Score
Loss	0–1	May 2014	Internationaux de Strasbourg, France	International	Clay	(Puerto Rico) Monica Puig	4–6, 3–6
Loss	0–2	Apr 2016	Copa Colsanitas, Colombia	International	Clay	(United States) Irina Falconi	2–6, 6–2, 4–6

=== Doubles: 2 (1 title, 1 runner-up) ===
Legend Premier (1–0) International (0–1)	Finals by surface Hard (1–1)

Result	Date	Tournament	Tier	Surface	Partner	Opponents	Score
Loss	Feb 2014	Brasil Tennis Cup, Brazil	International	Hard	(Italy) Francesca Schiavone	(Spain) Anabel Medina Garrigues (Kazakhstan) Yaroslava Shvedova	6–7^{(1–7)}, 6–2, [3–10]
Win	Aug 2014	Connecticut Open, United States	Premier	Hard	(Slovenia) Andreja Klepač	(New Zealand) Marina Erakovic (Spain) Arantxa Parra Santonja	7–5, 4–6, [10–7]

== WTA 125 finals ==
=== Doubles: 1 (runner-up) ===
Result	Date	Tournament	Surface	Partner	Opponents	Score
Loss	Jun 2018	Bol Open, Croatia	Hard	(Czech Republic) Barbora Štefková	(Colombia) Mariana Duque-Mariño (China) Wang Yafan	3–6, 5–7

== ITF finals ==
=== Singles: 10 (5 titles, 5 runner-ups) ===
Legend $100,000 tournaments $50,000 tournaments $25,000 tournaments	Finals by surface Hard (1–1) Clay (4–4)

Result	W–L	Date	Tournament	Tier	Surface	Opponent	Score
Win	1–0	Nov 2007	ITF Sintra, Portugal	25,000	Clay (i)	(Netherlands) Romana Janshen	7–6^{(7–3)}, 7–6^{(7–3)}
Loss	1–1	Jul 2008	ITF Vigo, Spain	25,000	Hard	(Portugal) Neuza Silva	3–6, 1–6
Loss	1–2	Jun 2009	ITF Getxo, Spain	25,000	Clay	(Argentina) Agustina Lepore	7–6^{(7–3)}, 4–6, 0–6
Win	2–2	Sep 2009	ITF Madrid, Spain	25,000	Hard	(Ukraine) Irina Buryachok	6–3, 6–4
Win	3–2	Jun 2010	ITF Getxo, Spain	25,000	Clay	(Germany) Sarah Gronert	6–2, 6–1
Loss	3–3	Aug 2010	Ladies Open Hechingen, Germany	25,000	Clay	(Poland) Magda Linette	5–7, 6–3, 2–6
Win	4–3	Sep 2011	Sofia Cup, Bulgaria	100,000	Clay	(Italy) Romina Oprandi	2–6, 6–6 ret.
Loss	4–4	Sep 2011	Open de Saint-Malo, France	100,000+H	Clay	(Romania) Sorana Cîrstea	2–6, 2–6
Loss	4–5	Jun 2015	Open Montpellier, France	50,000+H (Note: The $50,000 tournaments were reclassified as $60,000 in 2017.)	Clay	(Spain) Lourdes Domínguez Lino	4–6, 3–6
Win	5–5	Jun 2016	ATV Rome Open, Italy	50,000	Clay	(Spain) Laura Pous Tió	2–6, 6–4, 7–5

=== Doubles: 8 (2 titles, 6 runner-ups) ===
Legend $75,000 tournaments $50/60,000 tournaments $25,000 tournaments	Finals by surface Hard (0–2) Clay (2–4)

Result	W–L	Date	Tournament	Tier	Surface	Partner	Opponents	Score
Loss	0–1	Apr 2006	ITF Torrent, Spain	25,000	Clay	(Spain) Carla Suárez Navarro	(Russia) Ekaterina Makarova (Spain) Gabriela Velasco Andreu	4–6, 2–6
Loss	0–2	Jun 2006	ITF Gorizia, Italy	25,000	Clay	(Spain) Matilde Muñoz Gonzalves	(Argentina) Soledad Esperón (South Africa) Chanelle Scheepers	4–6, 3–6
Loss	0–3	Mar 2008	ITF La Palma, Spain	25,000	Hard	(Spain) Estrella Cabeza Candela	(Ukraine) Yuliya Beygelzimer (Switzerland) Stefanie Vögele	5–7, 6–7^{(5–7)}
Loss	0–4	Oct 2009	Open de Saint-Raphaël, France	50,000	Hard (i)	(Georgia (country)) Margalita Chakhnashvili	(France) Claire Feuerstein (France) Stéphanie Foretz	6–7^{(4–7)}, 5–7
Loss	0–5	Jul 2016	Prague Open, Czech Republic	75,000	Clay	(Spain) Sara Sorribes Tormo	(Netherlands) Demi Schuurs (Czech Republic) Renata Voráčová	5–7, 6–3, [4–10]
Loss	0–6	May 2017	Open Saint-Gaudens, France	60,000	Clay	(Paraguay) Montserrat González	(Chinese Taipei) Chang Kai-chen (China) Han Xinyun	5–7, 1–6
Win	1–6	Jun 2017	Internacional de Barcelona, Spain	60,000	Clay	(Paraguay) Montserrat González	(Israel) Julia Glushko (Australia) Priscilla Hon	6–4, 6–3
Win	2–6	Apr 2018	ITF Indian Harbour Beach, United States	60,000	Clay	(Romania) Irina Bara	(United States) Jessica Pegula (United States) Maria Sanchez	6–4, 6–2
