= BVV Prague Open =

Defunct tennis tournament
- Tour: WTA Tour (1990–99)
- Founded: 1993
- Abolished: 1994
- Editions: 2
- Location: Prague, Czech Republic
- Venue: I. ČLTK Prague
- Surface: Clay / outdoor

The BVV Prague Open was a women's tennis tournament played on outdoor clay courts at the I. ČLTK Prague in Prague in the Czech Republic that was part of WTA Tour. It was held from 1993 to 1994 with a prize money of $100.000.

South African Amanda Coetzer won both singles and doubles titles in the same edition.

== Results ==
=== Singles ===
Year	Champions	Runners-up	Score
1993	(Ukraine) Natalia Medvedeva	(Russia) Meike Babel	7–5, 6–4
1994	(South Africa) Amanda Coetzer	(Sweden) Åsa Carlsson	6–1, 7–6^{(16–14)}

=== Doubles ===
Year	Champions	Runners-up	Score
1993	(Argentina) Inés Gorrochategui (Argentina) Patricia Tarabini	(Italy) Laura Golarsa (Netherlands) Caroline Vis	6–2, 6–1
1994	(South Africa) Amanda Coetzer (United States) Linda Harvey-Wild	(Netherlands) Kristie Boogert (Italy) Laura Golarsa	6–4, 3–6, 6–2

== See also ==
- 1992 HTC Prague Open
- I.ČLTK Prague Open
