= 1994 Styrian Open =

- Date: 26–31 July
- Edition: 22nd
- Category: Tier IV
- Draw: 32S / 16D
- Prize money: $100,000
- Surface: Clay / outdoor
- Location: Maria Lankowitz, Austria
- Venue: Sportpark Piberstein

Champions

Singles
- (Germany) Anke Huber

Doubles
- (Italy) Sandra Cecchini / (Argentina) Patricia Tarabini
- WTA Austrian Open

The 1994 Styrian Open was a women's tennis tournament played on outdoor clay courts at the Sportpark Piberstein in Maria Lankowitz, Austria that was part of Tier IV of the 1994 WTA Tour. It was the 22nd edition of the tournament and was held from 26 July until 31 July 1994. First-seeded Anke Huber won the singles title and earned $18,000 first-prize money.

== Finals ==
=== Singles ===
(Germany) Anke Huber defeated (Austria) Judith Wiesner 6–3, 6–3

- It was Huber's 1st singles title of the year and the 4th of her career.

=== Doubles ===
(Italy) Sandra Cecchini / (Argentina) Patricia Tarabini defeated (France) Alexandra Fusai / (Slovakia) Karina Habšudová 7–5, 7–5

- It was Cecchini's only doubles title of the year and the 10th of her career. It was Tarabini's only doubles title of the year and the 16th of her career.
