= Radka Zrubáková =

Slovak tennis player

- Country (sports): Slovakia
- Residence: Bratislava, Slovakia
- Born: 26 December 1970 (age 55) Bratislava, Czechoslovakia
- Turned pro: 1986
- Retired: 1999
- Plays: Right-handed (two-handed backhand)
- Prize money: $1,074,479

Singles
- Career record: 265–205
- Career titles: 3 WTA, 3 ITF
- Highest ranking: No. 22 (21 October 1991)

Grand Slam singles results
- Australian Open: 4R (1988)
- French Open: 3R (1988, 1990)
- Wimbledon: 3R (1995, 1997)
- US Open: 4R (1991)

Doubles
- Career record: 164–173
- Career titles: 2 WTA, 5 ITF
- Highest ranking: No. 38 (5 April 1993)

Grand Slam doubles results
- Australian Open: 3R (1995, 1997)
- French Open: 2R (1988,91,92,93,95,96,97,1999)
- Wimbledon: 2R (1994, 1995)
- US Open: 2R (1993, 1994)

Team competitions
- Fed Cup: W (1988), record 19–8

Radomira "Radka" Zrubáková (born 26 December 1970) is a Slovak retired tennis player.

Zrubáková gained professional status in 1986. In her career, she won three singles and two doubles titles on the WTA Tour. She was a member of the Czechoslovakia Federation Cup team that won the 1988 Federation Cup final. Zrubáková reached career-high rankings of 22 in singles (in October 1991) and 38 in doubles (in April 1993). She retired from the pro tour in 1999.

== WTA career finals ==
=== Singles: 4 (3–1) ===
Legend
Grand Slam tournaments (0)
Tier I (0)
Tier II (0)
Tier III (0)
Tier IV & V (0)

| Result | W/L | Date | Tournament | Surface | Opponent | Score |
|---|---|---|---|---|---|---|
| Win | 1–0 | Jul 1989 | Brussels, Belgium | Clay | (Argentina) Mercedes Paz | 7–6^{(8–6)}, 6–4 |
| Win | 2–0 | May 1991 | Strasbourg, France | Clay | (Australia) Rachel McQuillan | 7–6^{(7–3)}, 7–6^{(7–3)} |
| Loss | 2–1 | May 1992 | Lucerne, Switzerland | Clay | (United States) Amy Frazier | 4–6, 6–4, 5–7 |
| Win | 3–1 | Jul 1992 | Prague, Czech Republic | Clay | (Czechoslovakia) Kateřina Šišková | 6–3, 7–5 |

=== Doubles: 6 (2–4) ===
| Result | W/L | Date | Tournament | Surface | Partner | Opponents | Score |
|---|---|---|---|---|---|---|---|
| Win | 1–0 | Sep 1990 | Kitzbühel, Austria | Clay | (Czechoslovakia) Petra Langrová | (Italy) Sandra Cecchini (Argentina) Patricia Tarabini | 6–0, 6–4 |
| Loss | 1–1 | Feb 1991 | Linz, Austria | Carpet (i) | (Czechoslovakia) Petra Langrová | (Switzerland) Manuela Maleeva (Italy) Raffaella Reggi | 4–6, 6–1, 3–6 |
| Win | 2–1 | Sep 1991 | Paris, France | Clay | (Czechoslovakia) Petra Langrová | (France) Alexia Dechaume (France) Julie Halard | 6–4, 6–4 |
| Loss | 2–2 | May 1992 | Taranto, Italy | Clay | (Australia) Rachel McQuillan | (South Africa) Amanda Coetzer (Argentina) Inés Gorrochategui | 6–4, 3–6, 6–7^{(0–7)} |
| Loss | 2–3 | Oct 1992 | Brighton, UK | Carpet (i) | (Spain) Conchita Martínez | (Latvia) Larisa Neiland (Czechoslovakia) Jana Novotná | 4–6, 1–6 |
| Loss | 2–4 | Mar 1993 | Houston, United States | Clay | (Russia) Eugenia Maniokova | (United States) Katrina Adams (Netherlands) Manon Bollegraf | 3–6, 7–5, 6–7^{(7–9)} |

== ITF Circuit finals ==
$100,000 tournaments
$75,000 tournaments
$50,000 tournaments
$25,000 tournaments
$10,000 tournaments

=== Singles (3–2) ===
| Result | No. | Date | Tournament | Surface | Opponent | Score |
|---|---|---|---|---|---|---|
| Loss | 1. | Sep 1986 | ITF Sibenik, Yugoslavia | Clay | (Italy) Barbara Romanò | 2–6, 2–6 |
| Win | 1. | Jan 1987 | ITF Helsinki, Finland | Hard | (Sweden) Cecilia Dahlman | 6–2, 2–6, 6–0 |
| Win | 2. | Jul 1994 | ITF Erlangen, Germany | Clay | (Italy) Federica Bonsignori | 6–2, 6–1 |
| Win | 3. | Oct 1994 | ITF Negril, Jamaica | Hard | (South Africa) Kim Grant | 6–0, 6–2 |
| Loss | 2. | Oct 1996 | ITF Indian Wells, United States | Hard | (United States) Annie Miller | 3–6, 2–6 |

=== Doubles (5–8) ===
| Result | No. | Date | Tournament | Surface | Partner | Opponents | Score |
|---|---|---|---|---|---|---|---|
| Loss | 1. | Apr 1986 | ITF Šibenik, Yugoslavia | Clay | (Czechoslovakia) Denisa Krajčovičová | (Czechoslovakia) Petra Langrová (Czechoslovakia) Jana Pospíšilová | 1–6, 2–6 |
| Loss | 2. | Sep 1986 | Mali Lošinj, Yugoslavia | Clay | (Czechoslovakia) Denisa Krajčovičová | (Czechoslovakia) Petra Langrová (Czechoslovakia) Jana Pospíšilová | 3–6, 6–7 |
| Win | 1. | Oct 1986 | Rabac, Yugoslavia | Clay | (Czechoslovakia) Denisa Krajčovičová | (Czechoslovakia) Petra Langrová (Czechoslovakia) Jana Pospíšilová | 6–3, 6–2 |
| Loss | 3. | Dec 1986 | Budapest, Hungary | Clay | (Czechoslovakia) Denisa Krajčovičová | (Czechoslovakia) Jana Novotná (Czechoslovakia) Regina Rajchrtová | 1–6, 7–6, 3–6 |
| Loss | 4. | Jan 1987 | Helsinki, Finland | Carpet (i) | (Czechoslovakia) Denisa Krajčovičová | (Sweden) Cecilia Dahlman (Finland) Laura Maennistoe | 7–6, 6–7, 6–7 |
| Loss | 5. | Jan 1987 | Stavanger, Norway | Carpet (i) | (Czechoslovakia) Denisa Krajčovičová | (Sweden) Catrin Jexell (Sweden) Lena Sandin | 6–3, 1–6, 1–6 |
| Win | 2. | Jul 1987 | Neumünster, West Germany | Clay | (Czechoslovakia) Denisa Krajčovičová | (Czechoslovakia) Nora Bajčíková (Czechoslovakia) Iva Budařová | 6–0, 6–2 |
| Win | 3. | Jun 1994 | Sopot, Poland | Clay | (Slovakia) Janette Husárová | (Slovakia) Patrícia Marková (Slovakia) Katarína Studeníková | 6–2, 7–5 |
| Win | 4. | Jul 1995 | ITF Stuttgart, Germany | Clay | (Slovakia) Henrieta Nagyová | (Socialist Federal Republic of Yugoslavia) Tatjana Ječmenica (Ukraine) Elena Tatarkova | 6–3, 7–6 |
| Win | 5. | Sep 1995 | ITF Bratislava, Slovakia | Clay | (Czech Republic) Petra Langrová | (Netherlands) Yvette Basting (Poland) Magdalena Grzybowska | 6–3, 6–1 |
| Loss | 6. | Sep 1996 | ITF Bratislava, Slovakia | Clay | (Czech Republic) Petra Langrová | (Slovakia) Denisa Krajčovičová (Hungary) Andrea Temesvári | 6–0, 3–6, 3–6 |
| Loss | 7. | May 1999 | ITF Bratislava, Slovakia | Clay | (Czech Republic) Lenka Němečková | (Slovenia) Tina Križan (Slovenia) Katarina Srebotnik | 1–6, 3–6 |
| Loss | 8. | Nov 1999 | ITF Stupava, Slovakia | Hard (i) | (Slovakia) Alena Paulenková | (Czech Republic) Gabriela Chmelinová (Czech Republic) Hana Šromová | 1–6, 0–6 |
