= Ivana Havrlíková =

Czech tennis player

- Country (sports): Czech Republic
- Born: 22 August 1973 (age 53) Czechoslovakia
- Turned pro: 1991
- Retired: 1999
- Prize money: $28,926

Singles
- Career record: 101–55
- Career titles: 2 ITF
- Highest ranking: 267 (2 October 1995)

Doubles
- Career record: 66–34
- Career titles: 8 ITF
- Highest ranking: 152 (23 March 1992)

Ivana Havrlíková (born 22 August 1973) is a former professional Czech tennis player. On 2 October 1995, she reached her highest WTA singles ranking of 267.

In 1992 Her only WTA Tour main draw appearance came at the Linz Open she partnered with countrywoman Alice Noháčová in the doubles event. But semi-finals lost Dutch Monique Kiene and Miriam Oremans.

== ITF finals ==
$25,000 tournaments
$10,000 tournaments

=== Singles: 3 (2–1) ===
Result	No.	Date	Tournament	Surface	Opponent	Score
Win	1.	28 September 1992	Mali Lošinj, Yugoslavia	Clay	(West Germany) Sabine Haas	6–3, 6–2
Win	2.	13 August 1995	Paderborn, Germany	Clay	(Czech Republic) Jana Macurová	6–3, 7–5
Loss	1.	11 September 1995	Sofia, Bulgaria	Clay	(Switzerland) Emanuela Zardo	2–6, 3–6

=== Doubles: 16 (8–8) ===
Result	No	Date	Tournament	Surface	Partner	Opponents	Score
Win	1.	25 March 1991	Supetar, Yugoslavia	Clay	(Czechoslovakia) Dominika Gorecká	(Socialist Federal Republic of Yugoslavia) Ivona Horvat (Czechoslovakia) Eva Martincová	2–6, 6–2, 7–5
Win	2.	5 August 1991	Paderborn, Germany	Clay	(Czechoslovakia) Pavlína Rajzlová	(Germany) Nadja Beik (Germany) Meike Babel	6–4, 6–0
Loss	1.	12 August 1991	Munich, Germany	Clay	(Czechoslovakia) Pavlína Rajzlová	(Czechoslovakia) Janette Husárová (Soviet Union) Irina Zvereva	5–7, 2–6
Win	3.	5 August 1991	Klagenfurt, Austria	Clay	(Czechoslovakia) Pavlína Rajzlová	(Czechoslovakia) Katerina Vlčková (Czechoslovakia) Alena Vašková	5–7, 6–2, 6–4
Loss	2.	16 September 1991	Sofia, Bulgaria	Clay	(Czechoslovakia) Kateřina Sisková	(Germany) Meike Babel (United Kingdom) Valda Lake	5–7, 0–6
Loss	3.	27 October 1991	Flensburg, Germany	Carpet (i)	(Czechoslovakia) Alena Havrlíková	(Belgium) Laurence Courtois (Belgium) Nancy Feber	2–6, 3–6
Loss	4.	21 September 1992	Makarska, Yugoslavia	Clay	(Czechoslovakia) Markéta Štusková	(Socialist Federal Republic of Yugoslavia) Maja Murić (Socialist Federal Republic of Yugoslavia) Petra Rihtarić	6–3, 1–6, 2–6
Win	4.	11 January 1993	Coburg, Germany	Carpet	(Czech Republic) Pavlína Rajzlová	(Germany) Sabine Auer (Germany) Heike Thoms	6–3, 6–0
Loss	5.	12 April 1993	Neudorfl, Austria	Clay	(Czech Republic) Pavlína Rajzlová	(Slovakia) Zuzana Nemšáková (Czech Republic) Lenka Němečková	6–4, 4–6, 2–6
Loss	6.	22 August 1993	Koksijde, Belgium	Clay	(Czech Republic) Jitka Dubcová	(Australia) Mireille Dittmann (Australia) Natalie Dittmann	5–7, 6–2, 3–6
Win	5.	21 March 1994	Castellon, Spain	Clay	(Slovakia) Patrícia Marková	(Argentina) Maria Ines Araiz (Brazil) Vanessa Menga	4–6, 6–3, 6–3
Loss	7.	3 April 1994	Marsa, Malta	Clay	(Namibia) Elizma Nortje	(Poland) Isabela Listowska (Germany) Petra Winzenhöller	6–7^{(5–7)}, 3–6
Win	6.	10 April 1994	Murcia, Spain	Clay	(Brazil) Vanessa Menga	(Czech Republic) Jindra Gabrisová (Czech Republic) Dominika Gorecká	6–3, 6–1
Win	7.	31 July 1995	Horb, Germany	Clay	(Czech Republic) Monika Kratochvílová	(Bulgaria) Pavlina Nola (Russia) Anna Linkova	6–2, 7–5
Win	8.	21 August 1995	Wezel, Belgium	Clay	(Czech Republic) Monika Kratochvílová	(India) Nirupama Vaidyanathan (Czech Republic) Olga Hostáková	6–2, 6–3
Loss	8.	11 August 1996	Paderborn, Germany	Clay	(Czech Republic) Denisa Sobotková	(Czech Republic) Monika Maštalířová (Czech Republic) Sylva Nesvadbová	3–6, 6–3, 1–6
