= Pavlína Rajzlová =

Czech tennis player

- Country (sports): Czechoslovakia; Czech Republic
- Born: 23 May 1972 (age 54)
- Retired: 1997
- Prize money: $42,974

Singles
- Career record: 63–65
- Career titles: 2 ITF
- Highest ranking: No. 175 (4 July 1994)

Doubles
- Career record: 61–40
- Career titles: 8 ITF
- Highest ranking: No. 127 (26 July 1993)

Pavlína Rajzlová (born 23 May 1972) is a Czech former professional tennis player.

== Biography ==
Rajzlová played on the professional tour in the 1990s, reaching best rankings of 175 in singles and 127 in doubles.

Her best WTA Tour performance came at the 1993 Austrian Open, where she partnered Maja Murić to a runner-up finish in the doubles and had a singles win over world No. 31, Sandra Cecchini.

Now known as Pavlína Raisl, she works as a doctor in Germany, specialising in orthopedics.

== WTA career finals ==
=== Doubles: 1 (runner-up) ===
Result	Date	Tournament	Surface	Partner	Opponents	Score
Loss	Jul 1993	Kitzbühel Open, Austria	Clay	(Croatia) Maja Murić	(Belgium) Dominique Monami (China) Li Fang	2–6, 1–6

== ITF finals ==
=== Singles: 2 (2–0) ===
Legend
$25,000 tournaments
$10,000 tournaments

Result	No.	Date	Tournament	Surface	Opponent	Score
Win	1.	24 February 1992	ITF Castellón, Spain	Clay	(Croatia) Ivona Horvat	7–6, 6–2
Win	2.	15 June 1992	ITF Maribor, Slovenia	Clay	(Croatia) Maja Murić	7–6^{(3)}, 7–6^{(5)}

=== Doubles: 15 (8–7) ===
Result	No.	Date	Tournament	Surface	Partner	Opponents	Score
Win	1.	25 March 1991	ITF Putignano, Italy	Hard	(Czechoslovakia) Katarína Studeníková	(Italy) Giovanna Carotenuto (Finland) Marja-Liisa Kuurne	6–4, 6–2
Win	2.	5 August 1991	ITF Paderborn, Germany	Clay	(Czechoslovakia) Ivana Havrlíková	(Germany) Nadja Beik (Germany) Meike Babel	6–4, 6–0
Loss	3.	12 August 1991	ITF Munich, Germany	Clay	(Czechoslovakia) Ivana Havrlíková	(Czechoslovakia) Janette Husárová (Soviet Union) Irina Zvereva	5–7, 2–6
Win	4.	5 August 1991	ITF Klagenfurt, Austria	Clay	(Czechoslovakia) Ivana Havrlíková	(Czechoslovakia) Katerina Vlčková (Czechoslovakia) Alena Vašková	5–7, 6–2, 6–4
Win	5.	2 March 1992	ITF Granada, Spain	Hard	(Commonwealth of Independent States) Elena Pogorelova	(Commonwealth of Independent States) Maria Marfina (Commonwealth of Independent States) Svetlana Komleva	6–4, 7–6^{(5)}
Win	6.	9 March 1992	ITF Castellón, Spain	Clay	(Czechoslovakia) Eva Martincová	(Croatia) Ivona Horvat (Czechoslovakia) Janette Husárová	7–5, 2–6, 6–1
Win	7.	15 June 1992	ITF Maribor, Slovenia	Clay	(Germany) Renata Kochta	(Slovenia) Tina Križan (Slovenia) Karin Lušnic	2–6, 6–4, 6–4
Win	8.	4 August 1992	ITF Vaihingen, Germany	Clay	(Czechoslovakia) Eva Martincová	(South Africa) Joannette Kruger (Bulgaria) Elena Pampoulova	6–4, 6–0
Win	9.	11 January 1993	ITF Coburg, Germany	Carpet (i)	(Czech Republic) Ivana Havrlíková	(Germany) Sabine Auer (Germany) Heike Thoms	6–3, 6–0
Loss	10.	1 February 1993	ITF Newcastle, United Kingdom	Carpet (i)	(Czech Republic) Helena Vildová	(Russia) Natalia Egorova (Russia) Svetlana Parkhomenko	4–6, 6–7, 0–6
Loss	11.	8 February 1993	ITF Sunderland, United Kingdom	Carpet (i)	(Czech Republic) Helena Vildová	(Russia) Natalia Egorova (Russia) Svetlana Parkhomenko	6–2, 1–6, 6–7
Loss	12.	1 March 1993	ITF Cascais, Portugal	Clay	(Czech Republic) Helena Vildová	(Netherlands) Lara Bitter (Netherlands) Amy van Buuren	1–6, 6–2, 3–6
Loss	13.	12 April 1993	ITF Neudorfl, Austria	Clay	(Czech Republic) Ivana Havrlíková	(Slovakia) Zuzana Nemšáková (Czech Republic) Lenka Němečková	6–4, 4–6, 2–6
Loss	14.	14 July 1996	ITF Puchheim, Germany	Clay	(Germany) Sabine Haas	(Czech Republic) Eva Martincová (Czech Republic) Alena Vašková	2–6, 7–5, 1–6
Loss	15.	21 July 1996	ITF Darmstadt, Germany	Clay	(Czech Republic) Lenka Cenková	(Germany) Adriana Barna (Germany) Anca Barna	6–4, 3–6, 3–6
