= Li Fang (tennis) =

Chinese tennis player (born 1973)

- Country (sports): China
- Residence: Hunan
- Born: 1 January 1973 (age 53) Hengyang (Hunan Province)
- Height: 1.66 m (5 ft 5 in)
- Turned pro: 1990
- Retired: 2001
- Plays: Right-handed (two-handed backhand)
- Prize money: $535,067

Singles
- Career record: 265–133
- Career titles: 0 WTA, 18 ITF
- Highest ranking: No. 36 (8 June 1998)

Grand Slam singles results
- Australian Open: 3R (1992)
- French Open: 2R (1994)
- Wimbledon: 2R (1994)
- US Open: 2R (1999)

Doubles
- Career record: 86–62
- Career titles: 2 WTA, 8 ITF
- Highest ranking: No. 49 (21 February 1994)

Grand Slam doubles results
- Australian Open: 3R (1992)
- French Open: 1R (1992)
- Wimbledon: 1R (1992)
- US Open: 2R (1992)

Team competitions
- Fed Cup: 20–13

Li Fang (Chinese: 李芳; pinyin: Lǐ Fāng, born 1 January 1973) is a retired female tennis player from China. She is widely regarded as the first professional tennis player from China.

Li turned professional in 1990, and won two WTA doubles titles in her career. In singles, Li Fang reached three finals on the WTA tour (Hobart 1995, Makarska and Pattaya in 1998), losing all of them. She represented her country at the 1992 Summer Olympics. Li played seven years on the China Fed Cup team. She retired in 2001.

== Personal ==
Li Fang was born in Hengyang in Hunan province to father Li Jianmin and mother Zhou Shanglian. As of 2014, Li Fang runs a tennis academy in Frisco, Texas.

== Performance timeline ==
Key
W	F	SF	QF	#R	RR	Q#	DNQ	A	NH

(W) winner; (F) finalist; (SF) semifinalist; (QF) quarterfinalist; (#R) rounds 4, 3, 2, 1; (RR) round-robin stage; (Q#) qualification round; (DNQ) did not qualify; (A) absent; (NH) not held; (SR) strike rate (events won / competed); (W–L) win–loss record.

=== Singles ===
Tournament	1992	1993	1994	1995	1996	1997	SR	W–L	Win %
Grand Slam tournaments
Australian Open							0 / 0	0–0	–
French Open							0 / 0	0–0	–
Wimbledon							0 / 0	0–0	–
US Open							0 / 0	0–0	–
Win–loss	0–0	0–0	0–0	0–0	0 / 0	0–0	–		

== WTA Tour career finals ==
Legend
Tier I (0)
Tier II (0)
Tier III (1)
Tier IV (4)

=== Singles: 3 runner-up ===
Result	No.	Date	Tournament	Surface	Opponent	Score
Loss	1.	Jan 1995	Hobart International	Hard	(Georgia (country)) Leila Meskhi	2–6, 3–6
Loss	2.	Apr 1998	Makarska International Championships	Clay	(Czech Republic) Květa Hrdličková	3–6, 1–6
Loss	3.	Nov 1998	PTT Pattaya Open	Hard	(France) Julie Halard-Decugis	1–6, 2–6

=== Doubles: 2 titles ===
Result	No.	Date	Tournament	Surface	Partnering	Opponents	Score
Win	1.	Jul 1993	Austrian Open, Kitzbühel	Clay	(Belgium) Dominique Monami	(Croatia) Maja Murić (Czech Republic) Pavlína Rajzlová	6–2, 6–1
Win	2.	Feb 1994	China Open, Beijing	Hard (i)	(China) Chen Li-Ling	(Australia) Kerry-Anne Guse (United Kingdom) Valda Lake	6–0, 6–2

== ITF finals ==
=== Singles (18–6) ===
$75,000 tournaments
$50,000 tournaments
$25,000 tournaments
$10,000 tournaments

Result	No.	Date	Tournament	Surface	Opponent	Score
Win	1.	12 March 1990	Murcia, Spain	Clay	(Italy) Sabrina Lucchi	6–2, 7–5
Win	2.	9 July 1990	Fayetteville, United States	Hard	(South Korea) Im Sook-ja	6–1, 1–6, 6–3
Loss	3.	4 March 1991	Granada, Spain	Clay	(Germany) Isabel Cueto	3–6, 3–6
Loss	4.	11 March 1991	Murcia, Spain	Hard	(Spain) Maite Martínez	6–7, 7–5, 3–6
Win	5.	25 March 1991	Bilbao, Spain	Hard	(Spain) Estefania Bottini	6–3, 6–1
Loss	6.	29 April 1991	Kuala Lumpur, Malaysia	Hard	(Chinese Taipei) Wang Shi-ting	4–6, 2–6
Win	7.	29 July 1991	Acireale, Italy	Clay	(Czech Republic) Jana Pospíšilová	6–0, 7–5
Win	8.	5 August 1991	Nicolosi, Italy	Hard	(United States) Kylie Johnson	6–2, 6–4
Win	9.	2 September 1991	Bangkok, Thailand	Hard	(Hong Kong) Tang Min	7–5, 6–2
Win	10.	9 September 1991	Bangkok, Thailand	Hard	(Hong Kong) Tang Min	6–0, 7–6^{(8–6)}
Win	11.	23 September 1991	Kuroshio, Japan	Hard	(Japan) Naoko Kijimuta	6–3, 6–4
Win	12.	7 October 1991	Matsuyama, Japan	Hard	(China) Chen Li-Ling	6–4, 6–3
Win	13.	14 October 1991	Kyoto, Japan	Hard	(Japan) Hiromi Yoshihara	7–6^{(7–3)}, 6–4
Win	14.	21 October 1991	Oita, Japan	Hard	(Australia) Kristine Kunce	6–3, 6–0
Loss	15.	28 October 1991	Saga, Japan	Grass	(Japan) Ei Iida	3–6, 3–6
Win	16.	6 April 1997	Phoenix, United States	Hard	(Puerto Rico) Kristina Brandi	6–1, 6–2
Win	17.	20 April 1997	Wichita, United States	Hard	(United States) Sandra Cacic	6–2, 6–2
Win	18.	6 July 1997	Flushing, United States	Hard	(United States) Lindsay Lee-Waters	7–5, 7–5
Win	19.	4 August 1997	Wichita, United States	Hard	(Italy) Laura Golarsa	6–3, 6–2
Loss	20.	13 July 1998	Mahwah, United States	Hard	(United States) Amy Frazier	w/o
Win	21.	21 June 1999	Vaihingen, Germany	Clay	(Austria) Patricia Wartusch	6–4, 7–6
Loss	22.	1 August 1999	Salt Lake City, United States	Hard	(Puerto Rico) Kristina Brandi	4–6, 3–6
Win	23.	19 September 1999	Hopewel, United States	Hard	(Canada) Jana Nejedly	6–0, 6–4
Win	24.	26 September 1999	Kirkland, United States	Hard	(China) Yi Jing-Qian	6–3, 2–6, 6–1

=== Doubles (8–5) ===
Result	No.	Date	Tournament	Surface	Partner	Opponents	Score
Win	1.	7 May 1990	Manila, Philippines	Hard	(China) Chen Li-Ling	(China) Lin Ning (China) Tang Min	6–3, 6–0
Win	2.	29 April 1991	Kuala Lumpur, Malaysia	Hard	(China) Tang Min	(Indonesia) Tanti Trayono (Indonesia) Agustina Wibisono	7–5, 6–3
Win	3.	6 May 1991	Manila, Philippines	Hard	(China) Tang Min	(Indonesia) Irawati Moerid (Indonesia) Lukky Tedjamukti	7–6^{(7–4)}, 6–7^{(5–7)}, 7–6^{(7–3)}
Win	4.	5 August 1991	Nicolosi, Italy	Hard	(China) Tang Min	(Italy) Gabriella Boschiero (United States) Kylie Johnson	6–0, 7–6^{(7–3)}
Win	5.	2 September 1991	Bangkok, Thailand	Hard	(China) Tang Min	(Thailand) Suvimol Duangchan (Thailand) Benjamas Sangaram	6–4, 6–2
Loss	6.	9 September 1991	Bangkok, Thailand	Hard	(China) Tang Min	(Indonesia) Irawati Moerid (Indonesia) Lukky Tedjamukti	6–4, 5–7, 4–6
Loss	7.	23 September 1991	Kuroshio, Japan	Hard	(China) Tang Min	(Japan) Naoko Kinoshita (Japan) Emiko Takahashi	7–5, 3–6, 4–6
Loss	8.	30 September 1991	Hokkaido, Japan	Hard	(China) Tang Min	(Japan) Yukie Koizumi (Japan) Miki Mizokuchi	1–6, 6–3, 3–6
Win	9.	14 October 1991	Kyoto, Japan	Hard	(China) Tang Min	(United States) Diana Gardner (Hong Kong) Paulette Moreno	6–4, 7–5
Loss	10.	30 September 1991	Saga, Japan	Grass	(China) Tang Min	(Mexico) Lupita Novelo (Australia) Kristine Kunce	7–5, 2–6, 5–7
Win	11.	4 September 1995	Tianjin, China	Hard	(China) Chen Li-Ling	(Germany) Kirstin Freye (South Africa) Tessa Price	6–2, 6–3
Loss	12.	6 July 1997	Flushing, United States	Hard	(United States) Keri Phebus	(Chinese Taipei) Janet Lee (United States) Lindsay Lee-Waters	2–6, 6–2, 3–6
Win	13.	19 September 1999	Hopewel, United States	Hard	(Russia) Alina Jidkova	(United States) Dawn Buth (South Africa) Kim Grant	6–3, 6–3

== See also ==
- Tennis in China
