= 1992 HTC Prague Open =

Defunct tennis tournament
- Founded: 1992
- Abolished: 1992
- Editions: 1
- Location: Prague, Czechoslovakia
- Venue: I. Czech Lawn Tennis Club
- Category: Tier V
- Surface: Clay / outdoor
- Draw: 32S / 16D

The 1992 HTC Prague Open was a women's tennis tournament played on outdoor clay courts at the I. Czech Lawn Tennis Club in Prague in the former Czechoslovakia that was part of Tier V of the 1992 WTA Tour. It was the only edition of the tournament with a prize money of $ 100.000, and it was held from 20 July until 26 July 1992. First-seeded Radka Zrubáková won the singles title.

== Finals ==
=== Singles ===
(Czechoslovakia) Radka Zrubáková defeated (Czechoslovakia) Kateřina Kroupová 6–3, 7–5

- It was Zrubáková's 1st singles title of the year and the 3rd of her career.

=== Doubles ===
(Germany) Karin Kschwendt / (Austria) Petra Ritter defeated (Czechoslovakia) Eva Švíglerová / (Netherlands) Noëlle van Lottum 6–4, 2–6, 7–5

- It was Kschwendt's 1st doubles title of the year and the 3rd of her career. It was Ritter's only doubles title of her career.

== See also ==
- BVV Prague Open
- I.ČLTK Prague Open
