= Laura Golarsa =

Italian tennis player

- Country (sports): Italy
- Born: 27 November 1967 (age 57); Milan, Italy
- Plays: Right-handed
- Prize money: US$ 1,012,453

Singles
- Career record: 299–281
- Career titles: 0 WTA, 6 ITF
- Highest ranking: No. 39 (25 June 1990)

Grand Slam singles results
- Australian Open: 1R (1989, 1990, 1993, 1994, 1995)
- French Open: 3R (1989)
- Wimbledon: QF (1989)
- US Open: 3R (1987, 1993, 1998)

Doubles
- Career record: 213–204
- Career titles: 6 WTA, 3 ITF
- Highest ranking: No. 23 (7 August 1995)

Grand Slam doubles results
- Australian Open: 3R (1994)
- French Open: 3R (1995)
- Wimbledon: 3R (1994)
- US Open: 3R (1994)

Grand Slam mixed doubles results
- Australian Open: 1R (1993, 1995, 1996, 1997)
- French Open: 2R (1996)
- Wimbledon: SF (1996)
- US Open: 2R (1996)
Medal record
Mediterranean Games
Silver medal – second place	1983 Casablanca	Women's Singles
Silver medal – second place	1983 Casablanca	Women's Doubles

Laura Golarsa (born 27 November 1967) is a former Italian professional tennis player.

Golarsa was born in Milan and played on the WTA Tour from 1985 to 2001. She did not win any senior titles but did reach the quarterfinals of Wimbledon in 1989. Her singles record included victories over Zina Garrison and Jana Novotná. She won six doubles titles on the WTA Tour and achieved a career-high doubles ranking of No. 23 in August 1995.

== WTA career finals ==
=== Singles: 1 (runner-up) ===
Legend
Tier I	0
Tier II	0
Tier III	0
Tier IV & V	0

Result	W/L	Date	Tournament	Tier	Surface	Opponent	Score
Loss	0–1	Aug 1988	Athens, Greece	Tier V	Clay	(West Germany) Isabel Cueto	0–6, 1–6

=== Doubles: 14 (6 titles, 8 runner-ups) ===
Legend
Tier I	0
Tier II	1
Tier III	2
Tier IV & V	3

Titles by surface
Hard	2
Clay	3
Grass	0
Carpet	1

Result	W/L	Date	Tournament	Tier	Surface	Partner	Opponents	Score
Win	1–0	Aug 1989	Sofia, Bulgaria	Cat 1	Clay	(Italy) Laura Garrone	(West Germany) Silke Meier (Bulgaria) Elena Pampoulova	6–4, 7–5
Loss	1–1	May 1990	Rome, Italy	Tier I	Clay	(Italy) Laura Garrone	(Canada) Helen Kelesi (Socialist Federal Republic of Yugoslavia) Monica Seles	3–6, 4–6
Win	2–1	Apr 1991	Bol, Yugoslavia	Tier III	Clay	(Bulgaria) Magdalena Maleeva	(Italy) Sandra Cecchini (Italy) Laura Garrone	Walkover
Loss	2–2	May 1991	Taranto, Italy	Tier V	Carpet	(United States) Ann Grossman	(France) Alexia Dechaume (Argentina) Florencia Labat	2–6, 5–7
Loss	2–3	Jul 1993	Prague, Czech Republic	Tier III	Hard	(Netherlands) Caroline Vis	(Argentina) Inés Gorrochategui (Argentina) Patricia Tarabini	2–6, 1–6
Win	3–3	Oct 1993	Brigton, UK	Tier II	Carpet (i)	(Ukraine) Natalia Medvedeva	(West Germany) Anke Huber (Soviet Union) Larisa Savchenko	6–3, 1–6, 6–4
Win	4–3	Jan 1994	Brisbane, Australia	Tier III	Hard	(Ukraine) Natalia Medvedeva	(Australia) Jenny Byrne (Australia) Rachel McQuillan	6–3, 6–1
Loss	4–4	May 1994	Prague, Czech Republic	Tier III	Clay	(Netherlands) Kristie Boogert	(South Africa) Amanda Coetzer (United States) Linda Wild	4–6, 6–3, 2–6
Loss	4–5	Sep 1994	Moscow, Russia	Tier I	Carpet (i)	(Netherlands) Caroline Vis	(Russia) Elena Makarova (Russia) Eugenia Maniokova	6–7^{(3–7)}, 4–6
Loss	4–6	Feb 1995	Auckland, New Zealand	Tier IV	Hard	(Netherlands) Caroline Vis	(Canada) Jill Hetherington (South Africa) Elna Reinach	6–7^{(5–7)}, 2–6
Win	5–6	Feb 1995	Oklahoma, U.S.	Tier III	Hard (i)	(United States) Nicole Arendt	(United States) Katrina Adams (Netherlands) Brenda Schultz	6–4, 6–3
Loss	5–7	Mar 1995	Puerto Rico, US	Tier III	Hard	(United States) Linda Wild	(Germany) Karin Kschwendt (Canada) Rene Simpson	2–6, 6–0, 4–6
Loss	5–8	Apr 1995	Zagreb, Croatia	Tier III	Clay	(Romania) Irina Spîrlea	(Argentina) Mercedes Paz (Canada) Rene Simpson	5–7, 2–6
Win	6–8	May 1999	Antwerp. Belgium	Tier IV	Clay	(Slovenia) Katarina Srebotnik	(Australia) Louise Pleming (United States) Meghann Shaughnessy	6–4, 6–2

== ITF Circuit finals ==
$100,000 tournaments
$75,000 tournaments
$50,000 tournaments
$25,000 tournaments
$10,000 tournaments

=== Singles (6–4) ===
Result	No.	Date	Location	Surface	Opponent	Score
Loss	1.	15 April 1985	Caserta, Italy	Clay	(Italy) Laura Garrone	7–5, 2–6, 4–6
Win	2.	22 April 1985	Monviso, Italy	Clay	(Argentina) Patricia Tarabini	6–4, 6–3
Win	3.	9 September 1985	Manhasset, United States	Clay	(Switzerland) Eva Krapl	7–6^{(4)}, 6–2
Loss	4.	28 July 1986	Sezze, Italy	Clay	(Italy) Barbara Romanò	2–6, 2–6
Win	5.	12 September 1988	Arzachena, Italy	Clay	(Spain) Rosa Bielsa	6–2, 6–2
Loss	6.	10 April 1989	Palermo, Italy	Clay	(Australia) Janine Thompson	2–6, 7–6, 4–6
Win	7.	9 April 1990	Bari, Italy	Clay	(Soviet Union) Viktoria Milvidskaia	6–3, 6–4
Win	8.	3 September 1990	Arzachena, Italy	Clay	(West Germany) Sabine Gerke	7–6^{(10)}, 7–6^{(6)}
Loss	9.	10 August 1997	Salt Lake City, United States	Hard	(China) Li Fang	3–6, 2–6
Win	10.	7 December 1997	Cergy-Pontoise, France	Hard (i)	(France) Anne-Gaëlle Sidot	4–6, 7–5, 7–6

=== Doubles (3–3) ===
Result	No.	Date	Location	Surface	Partner	Opponents	Score
Loss	1.	15 September 1986	Sofia, Bulgaria	Clay	(Netherlands) Marianne van der Torre	(Soviet Union) Natalia Egorova (Soviet Union) Viktoria Milvidskaia	0–6, 2–6
Win	2.	7 September 1992	Arzachena, Italy	Clay	(Italy) Laura Garrone	(Italy) Linda Ferrando (Italy) Silvia Farina Elia	6–4, 4–6, 6–4
Win	3.	25 February 1996	Redbridge, United Kingdom	Hard	(United States) Julie Steven	(Netherlands) Yvette Basting (Netherlands) Kim de Weille	6–3, 6–4
Loss	4.	26 February 1996	Southampton, United Kingdom	Carpet (i)	(Slovenia) Tina Križan	(United Kingdom) Valda Lake (United Kingdom) Clare Wood	4–6, 6–4, 3–6
Win	5.	27 July 1997	İstanbul, Turkey	Hard	(Argentina) Mercedes Paz	(Italy) Sylvia Plischke (Germany) Marlene Weingärtner	3–6, 6–3, 6–3
Loss	6.	7 March 1999	Dubai, United Arab Emirates	Hard	(Kazakhstan) Irina Selyutina	(Sweden) Åsa Carlsson (Belgium) Laurence Courtois	3–6, 7–6, 0–6
