= Meike Babel =

German tennis player

- Country (sports): Germany
- Born: 22 November 1974 (age 51) Langen, West Germany
- Height: 1.73 m (5 ft 8 in)
- Turned pro: 1991
- Retired: 2000
- Plays: Right-handed (one-handed backhand)
- Prize money: $546,425

Singles
- Career record: 132–113
- Career titles: 0 WTA, 2 ITF
- Highest ranking: No. 27

Grand Slam singles results
- Australian Open: 3R (1993)
- French Open: 3R (1997)
- Wimbledon: 2R (1994, 1995)
- US Open: 2R (1993, 1997)

Doubles
- Career record: 67–80
- Career titles: 1 WTA, 2 ITF
- Highest ranking: No. 45

Grand Slam doubles results
- Australian Open: 2R (1992, 1995)
- French Open: 3R (1998)
- Wimbledon: 2R (1995, 1998)
- US Open: 2R (1997, 1998)

Meike Babel (born 22 November 1974) is a former tennis player from Germany.

== Career ==
In her ten years on the WTA Tour, she ranked as high as world number 27 in singles and 45 in doubles.

== Coaching career ==
She was a women's tennis assistant coach at Tulane University and Vanderbilt University.

== WTA career finals ==
Tournament (W–R)	Singles	Doubles
Grand Slam tournaments	0–0	0–0
WTA Championships	0–0	0–0
Tier I	0–0	0–0
Tier II	0–0	0–0
Tier III	0–1	0–2
Tier IV	0–2	1–0

Surface (W–R)	Singles	Doubles
Hard	0–0	1–0
Clay	0–2	0–1
Grass	0–0	0–0
Carpet	0–1	0–1

=== Singles: 3 (3 runner-ups) ===
Result	W/L	Date	Tournament	Surface	Opponent	Score
Loss	0–1	May 1992	Waregem, Belgium	Clay	(Germany) Wiltrud Probst	2–6, 3–6
Loss	0–2	Jul 1993	Prague, Czech Republic	Clay	(Ukraine) Natalia Medvedeva	3–6, 2–6
Loss	0–3	Feb 1994	Linz, Austria	Carpet (i)	(Belgium) Sabine Appelmans	1–6, 6–4, 6–7

=== Doubles: 3 (1 title, 2 runner-ups) ===
Result	W/L	Date	Tournament	Surface	Partner	Opponents	Score
Loss	0–1	Jul 1997	Warsaw, Poland	Clay	(Australia) Catherine Barclay	(Romania) Ruxandra Dragomir (Argentina) Inés Gorrochategui	4–6, 0–6
Loss	0–2	Oct 1997	Luxembourg	Carpet (i)	(Belgium) Laurence Courtois	(Latvia) Larisa Neiland (Czech Republic) Helena Suková	2–6, 4–6
Win	1–2	Aug 1998	Istanbul, Turkey	Hard	(Belgium) Laurence Courtois	(Sweden) Åsa Carlsson (Argentina) Florencia Labat	6–0, 6–2

== ITF Circuit finals ==
$100,000 tournaments
$75,000 tournaments
$50,000 tournaments
$25,000 tournaments
$10,000 tournaments

=== Singles (2–1) ===
Result	No.	Date	Tournament	Surface	Opponent	Score
Win	1.	5 August 1991	Paderborn, Germany	Clay	(Germany) Eva-Maria Schürhoff	6–3, 7–6
Loss	1.	16 September 1991	Sofia, Bulgaria	Clay	(Netherlands) Monique Kiene	5–7, 3–6
Win	2.	28 October 1991	Madeira, Portugal	Hard	(Slovenia) Barbara Mulej	6–0, 6–2

=== Doubles (2–3) ===
Result	No.	Date	Tournament	Surface	Partner	Opponents	Score
Loss	1.	10 February 1991	Helsinki, Finland	Carpet (i)	(Germany) Nadja Beik	(Bulgaria) Lubomira Bacheva (Soviet Union) Elena Pogorelova	2–6, 6–3, 3–6
Loss	2.	29 July 1991	Rheda, Germany	Clay	(Romania) Irina Spîrlea	(Sweden) Catarina Bernstein (Sweden) Annika Narbe	4–6, 5–7
Loss	3.	5 August 1991	Paderborn, Germany	Clay	(Germany) Nadja Beik	(Czechoslovakia) Ivana Havrlíková (Czechoslovakia) Pavlína Rajzlová	4–6, 0–6
Win	1.	16 September 1991	Sofia, Bulgaria	Clay	(United Kingdom) Valda Lake	(Czechoslovakia) Ivana Havrlíková (Czech Republic) Kateřina Šišková	7–5, 6–0
Win	2.	28 October 1991	Madeira, Portugal	Hard	(Netherlands) Carin Bakkum	(Spain) Rosa Bielsa (Spain) Janet Souto	6–3, 6–2
