= 1998 Japan Open Tennis Championships – Women's singles =

Women's singles
- 1998 Japan Open Tennis Championships

Final
- Champion: (Japan) Ai Sugiyama
- Runner-up: (United States) Corina Morariu
- Score: 6–3, 6–3

Details
- Draw: 30 (4 Q / 2 WC )
- Seeds: 8

Events
Singles	men	women
Doubles	men	women
← 1997 ·	Japan Open	· 1999 →

First-seeded Ai Sugiyama was the defending champion and won in the final 6–3, 6–3 against Corina Morariu.

== Seeds ==
A champion seed is indicated in bold text while text in italics indicates the round in which that seed was eliminated. The top two seeds received a bye to the second round.

1. (Japan) **Ai Sugiyama (champion)**
2. (Japan) Naoko Sawamatsu (quarterfinals)
3. (Thailand) Tamarine Tanasugarn (second round)
4. (United States) Amy Frazier (semifinals)
5. (United States) Corina Morariu (final)
6. (Chinese Taipei) Shi-Ting Wang (semifinals)
7. (Japan) Miho Saeki (first round)
8. (Japan) Yuka Yoshida (second round)

== Draw ==
=== Key ===
- Q = Qualifier
- WC = Wild card
- LL = Lucky loser
- Alt = Alternate
- ITF = ITF entry
- PR = Protected ranking
- SR = Special ranking
- SE = Special exempt
- JE = Junior exempt
- JR = Junior Accelerator Programme entrant
- CO = College Accelerator Programme entrant
- NG = Next Gen Accelerator Program entrant
- w/o = Walkover
- r = Retired
- d = Defaulted

=== Final ===
Final
1	(Japan) **Ai Sugiyama**	**6**	**6**
5	(United States) Corina Morariu	3	3

=== Section 1 ===
First round
(Japan) **N Miyagi**	**6**	3	**7**
(United States) L Osterloh	0	**6**	6
Q	(South Africa) S De Beer	4	4
(United States) **E deLone**	**6**	**6**
(Japan) N Kijimuta	1	**6**	1
8	(Japan) **Y Yoshida**	**6**	4	**6**
3	(Thailand) **T Tanasugarn**	4	**7**	**6**
(South Korea) E-H Kim	**6**	5	0
(South Korea) M-R Jeon	4	1
(United States) **L McNeil**	**6**	**6**
Q	(Japan) S Hisamatsu	2	2
(Japan) **R Hiraki**	**6**	**6**
WC	(Japan) S Asagoe	**6**	3	1
6	(Chinese Taipei) **S-T Wang**	3	**6**	**6**

Second round
1	(Japan) **A Sugiyama**	**6**	**6**
(Chinese Taipei) S-T Wang	3	2
(United States) **E deLone**	**6**	2	**6**
8	(Japan) Y Yoshida	3	**6**	2
3	(Thailand) T Tanasugarn	2	3
(United States) **L McNeil**	**6**	**6**
(Japan) R Hiraki	3	2
6	(Chinese Taipei) **S-T Wang**	**6**	**6**

Quarterfinals
1	(Japan) **A Sugiyama**	4	**6**	**6**
(United States) E deLone	**6**	1	1
(United States) L McNeil	**6**	4	1
6	(Chinese Taipei) **S-T Wang**	4	**6**	**6**

Semifinals
1	(Japan) **A Sugiyama**	**6**	**6**
6	(Chinese Taipei) S-T Wang	3	2

=== Section 2 ===
First round
7	(Japan) M Saeki	6	2
(United States) **G Helgeson-Nielsen**	**7**	**6**
WC	(Japan) S Obata	5	1
(Australia) **N Pratt**	**7**	**6**
(Australia) K Kunce	**7**	4	1
Q	(Japan) **M Endo**	6	**6**	**6**
Q	(South Korea) Y-J Choi	4	2
4	(United States) **A Frazier**	**6**	**6**
5	(United States) **C Morariu**	**6**	**6**
(South Korea) S-H Park	4	2
(United States) **M Shaughnessy**	3	**6**	**6**
(Chinese Taipei) J Lee	**6**	2	4
(Japan) **H Inoue**	**6**	**6**
(Netherlands) S Noorlander	4	1

Second round
(United States) G Helgeson-Nielsen	3	2
(Australia) **N Pratt**	**6**	**6**
Q	(Japan) M Endo	0	1
4	(United States) **A Frazier**	**6**	**6**
5	(United States) **C Morariu**	**6**	**6**
(United States) M Shaughnessy	3	2
(Japan) H Inoue	**6**	4	6
2	(Japan) **N Sawamatsu**	4	**6**	**7**

Quarterfinals
(Australia) N Pratt	2	**6**	2
4	(United States) **A Frazier**	**6**	4	**6**
5	(United States) **C Morariu**	**7**	**6**
2	(Japan) N Sawamatsu	5	3

Semifinals
4	(United States) A Frazier	**6**	6	4
5	(United States) **C Morariu**	4	**7**	**6**
