= 1997 Japan Open Tennis Championships – Women's doubles =

Women's doubles
- 1997 Japan Open Tennis Championships

Final
- Champions: (France) Alexia Dechaume-Balleret (Japan) Rika Hiraki
- Runners-up: (Australia) Kerry-Anne Guse (United States) Corina Morariu
- Score: 6–4, 6–2

Details
- Draw: 16
- Seeds: 4

Events
Singles	men	women
Doubles	men	women
← 1996 ·	Japan Open Tennis Championships	· 1998 →

Kimiko Date and Ai Sugiyama were the defending champions but only Sugiyama competed that year with Shinobu Asagoe.

Asagoe and Sugiyama lost in the semifinals to Kerry-Anne Guse and Corina Morariu.

Alexia Dechaume-Balleret and Rika Hiraki won in the final 6–4, 6–2 against Guse and Morariu.

== Seeds ==
Champion seeds are indicated in bold text while text in italics indicates the round in which those seeds were eliminated.

1. (Japan) Naoko Kijimuta / (Japan) Nana Miyagi (semifinals)
2. (United States) Amy Frazier / (United States) Kimberly Po (quarterfinals)
3. (France) **Alexia Dechaume-Balleret** / (Japan) **Rika Hiraki (champions)**
4. (Chinese Taipei) Janet Lee / (Chinese Taipei) Shi-Ting Wang (quarterfinals)

== Draw ==
=== Key ===
- Q = Qualifier
- WC = Wild card
- LL = Lucky loser
- Alt = Alternate
- ITF = ITF entry
- PR = Protected ranking
- SR = Special ranking
- SE = Special exempt
- JE = Junior exempt
- JR = Junior Accelerator Programme entrant
- CO = College Accelerator Programme entrant
- NG = Next Gen Accelerator Program entrant
- w/o = Walkover
- r = Retired
- d = Defaulted

First round
1	(Japan) **N Kijimuta** (Japan) **N Miyagi**	**6**	**6**
(Japan) H Mochizuki (Japan) K Takuma	3	1
(Italy) **R Grande** (United States) **G Helgeson-Nielsen**	**6**	6	**6**
(South Korea) S-H Park (Thailand) T Tanasugarn	2	**7**	3
3	(France) **A Dechaume-Balleret** (Japan) **R Hiraki**	**6**	**6**
(Japan) T Hotta (Japan) Y Yamagishi	1	2
(Japan) **M Saeki** (Japan) **Y Yoshida**	**6**	**6**
Q	(Japan) H Inoue (Japan) M Inoue	1	3
(Japan) **S Asagoe** (Japan) **A Sugiyama**	**7**	**6**
(Germany) S Haas (Ukraine) E Tatarkova	5	1
(Australia) A Ellwood (Austria) K Kschwendt	2	3
4	(Chinese Taipei) **J Lee** (Chinese Taipei) **S-T Wang**	**6**	**6**
(Australia) **K-A Guse** (United States) **C Morariu**	**6**	**6**
(United States) M Tu (India) N Vaidyanathan	1	3
(Japan) Y Hosoki (Japan) K Nagatomi	5	3
2	(United States) **A Frazier** (United States) **K Po**	**7**	**6**

Quarterfinals
1	(Japan) **N Kijimuta** (Japan) **N Miyagi**	**6**	**6**
(Italy) R Grande (United States) G Helgeson-Nielsen	4	3
3	(France) **A Dechaume-Balleret** (Japan) **R Hiraki**	**6**	**6**
(Japan) M Saeki (Japan) Y Yoshida	2	1
(Japan) **S Asagoe** (Japan) **A Sugiyama**	**6**	**6**
4	(Chinese Taipei) J Lee (Chinese Taipei) S-T Wang	3	3
(Australia) **K-A Guse** (United States) **C Morariu**	4	**6**	**6**
2	(United States) A Frazier (United States) K Po	**6**	2	2

Semifinals
1	(Japan) N Kijimuta (Japan) N Miyagi	**6**	1	3
3	(France) **A Dechaume-Balleret** (Japan) **R Hiraki**	3	**6**	**6**
(Japan) S Asagoe (Japan) A Sugiyama	4	3
(Australia) **K-A Guse** (United States) **C Morariu**	**6**	**6**

Final
3	(France) **Alexia Dechaume-Balleret** (Japan) **Rika Hiraki**	**6**	**6**
(Australia) Kerry-Anne Guse (United States) Corina Morariu	4	2
