= 1998 Japan Open Tennis Championships – Men's singles =

Men's singles
- 1998 Japan Open Tennis Championships

Final
- Champion: (Romania) Andrei Pavel
- Runner-up: (Zimbabwe) Byron Black
- Score: 6–3, 6–4

Details
- Draw: 56
- Seeds: 16

Events
Singles	men	women
Doubles	men	women
← 1997 ·	Japan Open	· 1999 →

The 1998 Japan Open Tennis Championships was a tennis tournament played on outdoor hard courts at the Ariake Coliseum in Tokyo in Japan that was part of the International Series Gold of the 1998 ATP Tour and of Tier III of the 1998 WTA Tour. The tournament was held from April 13 through April 19, 1998.

== Seeds ==
Champion seeds are indicated in bold text while text in italics indicates the round in which those seeds were eliminated.

1. (Australia) Patrick Rafter (second round)
2. (United States) Michael Chang (third round)
3. (United States) Jan-Michael Gambill (quarterfinals)
4. (Sweden) Thomas Johansson (second round)
5. (United States) Vince Spadea (second round)
6. (Czech Republic) Martin Damm (second round)
7. (Italy) Gianluca Pozzi (second round)
8. (Denmark) Kenneth Carlsen (second round)
9. (United States) Steve Campbell (second round)
10. (Zimbabwe) Byron Black (final)
11. (United States) Jan-Michael Gambill (semifinals)
12. (Czech Republic) Byron Black (semifinals)
13. (Sweden) Mikael Tillström (third round)
14. (France) Jérôme Golmard (third round)
15. (France) Arnaud Clément (first round)
16. (Romania) **Andrei Pavel (champions)**

== Draw ==
=== Key ===
- Q = Qualifier
- WC = Wild card
- LL = Lucky loser
- Alt = Alternate
- SE = Special exempt
- PR = Protected ranking
- ITF = ITF entry
- JE = Junior exempt
- w/o = Walkover
- r = Retired
- d = Defaulted
- SR = Special ranking

=== Finals ===
Semifinals
**(Romania) Andrei Pavel**	**6**	**6**
11	(United States) Jan-Michael Gambill	4	3
10	**(Zimbabwe) Byron Black**	**6**	**7**
12	(Czech Republic) Daniel Vacek	3	5

Final
16	**(Romania) Andrei Pavel**	**6**	**6**
10	(Zimbabwe) Byron Black	3	4

=== Top half ===
==== Section 1 ====
First round
**(United States) B MacPhie**	**7**	**6**
(Sweden) K Flygt	6	4
**(Czech Republic) R Vašek**	**6**	4	**7**
(Canada) S Lareau	4	**6**	6
16	**(Romania) A Pavel**	**6**	**6**
(France) O Delaître	3	0
9	**(United States) S Campbell**	**6**	**7**
(United Kingdom) A Richardson	1	6
**(Switzerland) I Heuberger**	**6**	**6**
(Japan) S Matsuoka	3	3
**(United States) D DiLucia**	**6**	3	**6**
(United States) David Wheaton	3	**6**	3

Second round
1	(Australia) P Rafter	3	6
**(United States) B MacPhie**	**6**	**7**
(Czech Republic) R Vašek	**7**	0	5
16	**(Romania) A Pavel**	5	**6**	**7**
9	(United States) S Campbell	3	6
**(Switzerland) I Heuberger**	**6**	**7**
**(United States) D DiLucia**	4	**6**	**6**
8	(Denmark) K Carlsen	**6**	3	3

Third round
(United States) B MacPhie	**6**	3	4
16	**(Romania) A Pavel**	3	**6**	**6**
(Switzerland) I Heuberger	3	**6**	3
**(United States) D DiLucia**	**6**	0	**6**

Quarterfinals
16	**(Romania) A Pavel**	**6**	**7**
(United States) D DiLucia	3	6

==== Section 2 ====
First round
**(Canada) D Nestor**	**6**	**6**
(South Africa) N Godwin	2	2
**(Japan) S Iwabuchi**	**7**	0
(United Kingdom) D Sapsford	5	1^{r}
14	**(France) J Golmard**	**6**	3	**6**
(Japan) T Chaen	2	**6**	1
11	**(United States) J-M Gambill**	**6**	**6**
(Italy) S Pescosolido	3	2
**(Japan) K Miyachi**	**6**	**6**
(Australia) A Belobrajdic	2	1
**(Germany) R Schüttler**	**6**	3	**6**
(Germany) C Vinck	4	**6**	3

Second round
3	**(United Kingdom) T Henman**	**6**	**7**
(Canada) D Nestor	2	5
(Japan) S Iwabuchi	4	4
14	**(France) J Golmard**	**6**	**6**
11	**(United States) J-M Gambill**	**6**	**6**
(Japan) K Miyachi	0	;3
**(Germany) R Schüttler**	**6**	**6**
6	(Czech Republic) M Damm	2	4

Third round
3	**(United Kingdom) T Henman**	**6**	**6**
14	(France) J Golmard	4	1
11	**(United States) J-M Gambill**	**6**	**6**
(Germany) R Schüttler	0	0

Quarterfinals
3	(United Kingdom) T Henman	3	**6**	3
11	**(United States) J-M Gambill**	**6**	4	**6**

=== Bottom half ===
==== Section 3 ====
First round
**(Australia) S Stolle**	**6**	**6**
(Japan) T Suzuki	2	3
**(Japan) G Motomura**	4	**6**	**7**
(United Kingdom) C Wilkinson	**6**	4	5
12	**(Czech Republic) D Vacek**	**6**	**6**
(Italy) V Santopadre	1	1
13	**(Sweden) M Tillström**	4	**6**	**6**
(Japan) K Masuda	**6**	3	0
**(United States) A O'Brien**	**6**	**6**
(Spain) Ó Burrieza	2	0
**(Germany) D Prinosil**	**6**	**6**
(United States) M Sell	2	1

Second round
5	(United States) V Spadea	3	0
**(Australia) S Stolle**	**6**	**6**
(Japan) G Motomura	2	2
12	**(Czech Republic) D Vacek**	**6**	**6**
13	**(Sweden) M Tillström**	5	**6**	**6**
(United States) A O'Brien	**7**	4	4
**(Germany) D Prinosil**	**6**	**6**
4	(Sweden) T Johansson	3	3

Third round
(Australia) S Stolle	5	3
12	**(Czech Republic) D Vacek**	**7**	**6**
13	(Sweden) M Tillström	4	6
**(Germany) D Prinosil**	**6**	**7**

Quarterfinals
12	**(Czech Republic) D Vacek**	**6**	**6**
(Germany) D Prinosil	4	1

==== Section 4 ====
First round
**(Italy) C Caratti**	**6**	**7**
(Australia) B Ellwood	0	6
**(Germany) L Burgsmüller**	**6**	**6**
(Austria) S Koubek	4	1
10	**(Zimbabwe) B Black**	3	**7**	**6**
(United States) J Stark	**6**	6	4
**(Germany) H Dreekmann**	**6**	**6**
15	(France) A Clément	3	4
**(Finland) T Ketola**	**6**	**6**
(Australia) M Tebbutt	4	4
**(Netherlands) J van Lottum**	**6**	0	**7**
(Japan) H Kaneko	4	**6**	5

Second round
7	(Italy) G Pozzi	3	6
**(Italy) C Caratti**	**6**	**7**
(Germany) L Burgsmüller	4	2
10	**(Zimbabwe) B Black**	**6**	**6**
**(Germany) H Dreekmann**	**7**	**7**
(Finland) T Ketola	6	6
(Netherlands) J van Lottum	4	1
2	**(United States) M Chang**	**6**	**6**

Third round
(Italy) C Caratti	3	4
10	**(Zimbabwe) B Black**	**6**	**6**
**(Germany) H Dreekmann**	**6**	5	**6**
2	(United States) M Chang	2	**7**	4

Quarterfinals
10	**(Zimbabwe) B Black**	**6**	**6**
(Germany) H Dreekmann	2	3
