= 1998 Japan Open Tennis Championships =

- Date: 13–19 April
- Edition: 25th
- Surface: Hard / outdoor
- Location: Tokyo, Japan
- Venue: Ariake Coliseum

Champions

Men's singles
- (Romania) Andrei Pavel

Women's singles
- (Japan) Ai Sugiyama

Men's doubles
- (Canada) Sébastien Lareau / (Canada) Daniel Nestor

Women's doubles
- (Japan) Naoko Kijimuta / (Japan) Nana Miyagi
← 1997 ·	Japan Open	· 1999 →

The 1998 Japan Open Tennis Championships was a tennis tournament played on outdoor hard courts at the Ariake Coliseum in Tokyo in Japan that was part of the International Series Gold of the 1998 ATP Tour and of Tier III of the 1998 WTA Tour. The tournament was held from April 13 through April 19, 1998. Andrei Pavel and Ai Sugiyama won the singles titles.

== Finals ==
=== Men's singles ===
(Romania) Andrei Pavel defeated (Zimbabwe) Byron Black, 6–3, 6–4.

- It was Pavel's 1st title of the year and the 1st of his career.

=== Women's singles ===
(Japan) Ai Sugiyama defeated (United States) Corina Morariu, 6–3, 6–3.

- It was Sugiyama's 3rd title of the year and the 7th of her career.

=== Men's doubles ===
(Canada) Sébastien Lareau / (Canada) Daniel Nestor defeated (France) Olivier Delaître / (Italy) Stefano Pescosolido, 6–3, 6–4.

- It was Lareau's 1st title of the year and the 6th of his career. It was Nestor's 1st title of the year and the 9th of his career.

=== Women's doubles ===
(Japan) Naoko Kijimuta / (Japan) Nana Miyagi defeated (United States) Amy Frazier / (Japan) Rika Hiraki, 6–3, 4–6, 6–4.

- It was Kijimuta's only title of the year and the 5th of her career. It was Miyagi's 2nd title of the year and the 9th of her career.
