= 2005 Hansol Korea Open – Singles =

Singles
- 2005 Hansol Korea Open

Final
- Champion: (Czech Republic) Nicole Vaidišová
- Runner-up: (Serbia and Montenegro) Jelena Janković
- Score: 7–5, 6–3

Details
- Draw: 32
- Seeds: 8

Events
Singles	Doubles
← 2004 ·	Korea Open	· 2006 →

Maria Sharapova was the defending champion from 2004, but decided not to compete in 2005.

Nicole Vaidišová won the title.

== Seeds ==
1. (Serbia and Montenegro) Jelena Janković (final)
2. (Czech Republic) Nicole Vaidišová (Winner)
3. (France) Tatiana Golovin (semifinals)
4. (Argentina) Gisela Dulko (second round)
5. (Japan) Ai Sugiyama (quarterfinals)
6. (Russia) Vera Dushevina (quarterfinals)
7. (Japan) Shinobu Asagoe (withdrew due to injury)
8. (France) Marion Bartoli (quarterfinals)
9. (Israel) Shahar Pe'er (first round)

== Draw ==
=== Key ===
- Q = Qualifier
- WC = Wild card
- LL = Lucky loser
- Alt = Alternate
- SE = Special exempt
- PR = Protected ranking
- ITF = ITF entry
- JE = Junior exempt
- w/o = Walkover
- r = Retired
- d = Defaulted
- SR = Special ranking

=== Finals ===
Semifinals
1	(Serbia and Montenegro) Jelena Janković	6	5	6
3	(France) Tatiana Golovin	4	7	4
(Colombia) Catalina Castaño	5	4
2	(Czech Republic) Nicole Vaidišová	7	6

Final
1	(Serbia and Montenegro) Jelena Janković	5	3
2	(Czech Republic) Nicole Vaidišová	7	6

=== Top half ===
First round
1	(Serbia and Montenegro) J Janković	6	6
(France) S Brémond	3	1
(United States) M Shaughnessy	6	7
(Russia) T Panova	1	6^{4}
WC	(South Korea) K-m Chang	3	1
(Japan) A Nakamura	6	6
(United States) A Spears	4	2
6	(Russia) V Dushevina	6	6
3	(France) T Golovin	6	5	6
LL	(Romania) E Gallovits	2	7	1
(United States) M Washington	6	5	3
(Argentina) M Díaz Oliva	0	7	6
Q	(Germany) M Müller	4	6	6
(Sweden) S Arvidsson	6	1	2
(United States) J Craybas	7	3	1
5	(Japan) A Sugiyama	5	6	6

Second round
1	(Serbia and Montenegro) J Janković	7	6
(United States) M Shaughnessy	6^{2}	2
(Japan) A Nakamura	3	6^{5}
6	(Russia) V Dushevina	6	7
3	(France) T Golovin	6	6
(Argentina) M Díaz Oliva	1	2
Q	(Germany) M Müller	4	3
5	(Japan) A Sugiyama	6	6

Quarterfinals
1	(Serbia and Montenegro) J Janković	5	6	6
6	(Russia) V Dushevina	7	3	3
3	(France) T Golovin	6	6
5	(Japan) A Sugiyama	3	2

Semifinals
1	(Serbia and Montenegro) J Janković	6	5	6
3	(France) T Golovin	4	7	4

=== Bottom half ===
First round
9	(Israel) S Pe'er	6	5	4
(United States) L Granville	3	7	6
(Australia) N Pratt	6	2	6
WC	(South Korea) S-j Kim	2	6	4
(Colombia) C Castaño	6	6
Q	(Puerto Rico) V Castellvi	1	3
Q	(Czech Republic) E Hrdinová	4	3
4	(Argentina) G Dulko	6	6
8	(France) M Bartoli	6	6
(Thailand) T Tanasugarn	0	1
(Venezuela) M Vento-Kabchi	6^{6}	1
Q	(Japan) S Obata	7	6
(France) C Pin	4	6	2
(Japan) A Morigami	6	3	6
LL	(Finland) E Laine	4	0
2	(Czech Republic) N Vaidišová	6	6

Second round
(United States) L Granville	6	6
(Australia) N Pratt	2	1
(Colombia) C Castaño	6	6
4	(Argentina) G Dulko	3	0
8	(France) M Bartoli	6	6
Q	(Japan) S Obata	2	3
(Japan) A Morigami	2	1
2	(Czech Republic) N Vaidišová	6	6

Quarterfinals
(United States) L Granville	6	1	1
(Colombia) C Castaño	2	6	6
8	(France) M Bartoli	4	1
2	(Czech Republic) N Vaidišová	6	6

Semifinals
(Colombia) C Castaño	5	4
2	(Czech Republic) N Vaidišová	7	6
