= 2004 Hansol Korea Open – Singles =

Singles
- 2004 Hansol Korea Open

Final
- Champion: (Russia) Maria Sharapova
- Runner-up: (Poland) Marta Domachowska
- Score: 6–1, 6–1

Details
- Draw: 32
- Seeds: 8

Events
Singles	Doubles
Korea Open	· 2005 →

This was the tournament's first edition.

Maria Sharapova won the title, defeating Marta Domachowska in straight sets in the final. This was Sharapova's third WTA Tour title of the year and fifth of her career.

== Seeds ==
1. (Russia) Maria Sharapova (champion)
2. (Japan) Shinobu Asagoe (second round)
3. (Germany) Marlene Weingärtner (first round)
4. (United States) Mashona Washington (first round)
5. (Slovenia) Katarina Srebotnik (second round)
6. (Slovakia) Ľubomíra Kurhajcová (first round)
7. (Japan) Saori Obata (first round)
8. (Australia) Samantha Stosur (quarterfinals)

== Draw ==
=== Key ===
- Q = Qualifier
- WC = Wild card
- LL = Lucky loser
- Alt = Alternate
- SE = Special exempt
- PR = Protected ranking
- ITF = ITF entry
- JE = Junior exempt
- w/o = Walkover
- r = Retired
- d = Defaulted
- SR = Special ranking

=== Finals ===
Semifinals
1	(Russia) Maria Sharapova	6	6
(Luxembourg) Anne Kremer	0	2
(Poland) Marta Domachowska	7	6
(United States) Abigail Spears	6^{5}	1

Final
1	(Russia) Maria Sharapova	6	6
(Poland) Marta Domachowska	1	1

=== Section 1 ===
First round
1	(Russia) M Sharapova	6	6
(Switzerland) E Gagliardi	1	3
LL	(Japan) M Saeki	6	4	7
Q	(United States) S Rao	3	6	6^{5}
(Russia) G Voskoboeva	6	4	7
(Venezuela) M Sequera	2	6	6^{7}
(South Korea) Y-j Cho	6^{1}	4
8	(Australia) S Stosur	7	6
4	(United States) M Washington	7	4	4
(Colombia) C Castaño	5	6	6
WC	(South Korea) J-h Kim	3	0
(Croatia) S Mamić	6	6
LL	(Japan) R Fujiwara	6	6
WC	(South Korea) S-j Kim	0	4
(Luxembourg) A Kremer	4	6	6
6	(Slovakia) Ľ Kurhajcová	6	1	3

Second round
1	(Russia) M Sharapova	6	6
LL	(Japan) M Saeki	3	1
(Russia) G Voskoboeva	2	4
8	(Australia) S Stosur	6	6
(Colombia) C Castaño	5	4
(Croatia) S Mamić	7	6
LL	(Japan) R Fujiwara	6^{4}	0
(Luxembourg) A Kremer	7	6

Quarterfinals
1	(Russia) M Sharapova	6	6
8	(Australia) S Stosur	2	1
(Croatia) S Mamić	6	4	1
(Luxembourg) A Kremer	2	6	6

Semifinals
1	(Russia) M Sharapova	6	6
(Luxembourg) A Kremer	0	2

=== Section 2 ===
First round
7	(Japan) S Obata	7	3	0^{r}
(Japan) Y Yoshida	5	6	2
(Italy) Ad Serra Zanetti	3	4
(Croatia) S Talaja	6	6
Q	(Chinese Taipei) C-j Chuang	7	3	6
(Czech Republic) K Böhmová	5	6	3
(Poland) M Domachowska	6	6
3	(Germany) M Weingärtner	1	3
5	(Slovenia) K Srebotnik	6	6
(Italy) An Serra Zanetti	1	1
(Czech Republic) L Němečková	1	2
Q	(Israel) S Pe'er	6	6
(Russia) L Skavronskaia	2	3
(United States) A Spears	6	6
Q	(Japan) S Okamoto	0	2
2	(Japan) S Asagoe	6	6

Second round
(Japan) Y Yoshida	6	3	0
(Croatia) S Talaja	4	6	6
Q	(Chinese Taipei) C-j Chuang	5	1
(Poland) M Domachowska	7	6
5	(Slovenia) K Srebotnik	3	3
Q	(Israel) S Pe'er	6	6
(United States) A Spears	6	1	6
2	(Japan) S Asagoe	3	6	3

Quarterfinals
(Croatia) S Talaja	6^{2}	6	0
(Poland) M Domachowska	7	2	6
Q	(Israel) S Pe'er	3	2
(United States) A Spears	6	6

Semifinals
(Poland) M Domachowska	7	6
(United States) A Spears	6^{5}	1
