= 1997 Danamon Open – Doubles =

Doubles
- 1997 Danamon Open

Final
- Champions: (Australia) Kerry-Anne Guse (Australia) Kristine Radford
- Runners-up: (Czech Republic) Lenka Němečková (Japan) Yuka Yoshida
- Score: 6–4, 5–7, 7–5

Details
- Draw: 16
- Seeds: 4

Events
Singles	Doubles
← 1996 ·	Danamon Open

Rika Hiraki and Naoko Kijimuta were the defending champions but they competed with different partners that year, Hiraki with Alexia Dechaume-Balleret and Kijimuta with Nana Miyagi.

Hiraki and Dechaume-Balleret lost in the first round to Lenka Němečková and Yuka Yoshida.

Kijimuta and Miyagi lost in the semifinals to Kerry-Anne Guse and Kristine Radford.

Guse and Radford won in the final 6–4, 5–7, 7–5 against Nemeckova and Yoshida.

== Seeds ==
Champion seeds are indicated in bold text while text in italics indicates the round in which those seeds were eliminated.

1. (Japan) Naoko Kijimuta / (Japan) Nana Miyagi (semifinals)
2. (France) Alexia Dechaume-Balleret / (Japan) Rika Hiraki (first round)
3. (South Korea) Sung-Hee Park / (Chinese Taipei) Shi-Ting Wang (first round)
4. (Australia) **Kerry-Anne Guse** / (Australia) **Kristine Radford (champions)**

== Draw ==
=== Key ===
- Q = Qualifier
- WC = Wild card
- LL = Lucky loser
- Alt = Alternate
- ITF = ITF entry
- PR = Protected ranking
- SR = Special ranking
- SE = Special exempt
- JE = Junior exempt
- JR = Junior Accelerator Programme entrant
- CO = College Accelerator Programme entrant
- NG = Next Gen Accelerator Program entrant
- w/o = Walkover
- r = Retired
- d = Defaulted

First round
1	(Japan) **N Kijimuta** (Japan) **N Miyagi**	**6**	**6**
WC	(Indonesia) M Chernovita (Indonesia) M Gunawan	1	2
(Germany) **S Haas** (India) **N Vaidyanathan**	**6**	5	**6**
(Japan) Y Hosoki (Japan) K Nagatomi	4	**7**	3
4	(Australia) **K-A Guse** (Australia) **K Radford**	**6**	**6**
(Japan) T Hotta (Japan) Y Yamagishi	3	4
(United States) **J Lee** (Thailand) **T Tanasugarn**	4	**6**	**6**
(United States) J Chi (United States) M Tu	**6**	2	1
LL	(Indonesia) **L Andriyani** (Indonesia) **I Iskandar**	**7**	**6**
Q	(South Korea) E-H Kim (Japan) M Kuki	5	3
(Belgium) **N Feber** (United States) **G Helgeson-Nielsen**	**6**	5	**6**
3	(South Korea) S-H Park (Chinese Taipei) S-T Wang	4	**7**	3
(Japan) **K Takuma** (Japan) **K Yazawa**	5	**7**	**6**
(South Korea) M-R Jeon (Thailand) B Sangaram	**7**	6	3
(Czech Republic) **L Němečková** (Japan) **Y Yoshida**	**6**	**6**
2	(France) A Dechaume-Balleret (Japan) R Hiraki	4	3

Quarterfinals
1	(Japan) **N Kijimuta** (Japan) **N Miyagi**	**6**	**6**
(Germany) S Haas (India) N Vaidyanathan	3	3
4	(Australia) **K-A Guse** (Australia) **K Radford**	**7**	**6**
(United States) J Lee (Thailand) T Tanasugarn	5	3
LL	(Indonesia) L Andriyani (Indonesia) I Iskandar	3	6
(Belgium) **N Feber** (United States) **G Helgeson-Nielsen**	**6**	**7**
(Japan) K Takuma (Japan) K Yazawa	0	2
(Czech Republic) **L Němečková** (Japan) **Y Yoshida**	**6**	**6**

Semifinals
1	(Japan) N Kijimuta (Japan) N Miyagi	5	3
4	(Australia) **K-A Guse** (Australia) **K Radford**	**7**	**6**
(Belgium) N Feber (United States) G Helgeson-Nielsen
(Czech Republic) **L Němečková** (Japan) **Y Yoshida**	**w/o**

Final
4	(Australia) **Kerry-Anne Guse** (Australia) **Kristine Radford**	**6**	5	**7**
(Czech Republic) Lenka Němečková (Japan) Yuka Yoshida	4	**7**	5
