= 1996 Danamon Open =

- Date: 9–14 April
- Edition: 4th
- Category: Tier III
- Draw: 32S / 16D
- Prize money: $164,250
- Surface: Hard / outdoor
- Location: Jakarta, Indonesia
- Venue: Gelora Senayan Stadium

Champions

Singles
- (United States) Linda Wild

Doubles
- (Japan) Rika Hiraki / (Japan) Naoko Kijimuta
← 1995 ·	Danamon Open	· 1997 →

The 1996 Danamon Open was a women's tennis tournament played on outdoor hard courts at the Gelora Senayan Stadium in Jakarta in Indonesia and was part of the Tier III category of the 1996 WTA Tour. It was the fourth edition of the tournament and ran from 9 April through 14 April 1996. Fifth-seeded Linda Wild won the singles title.

== Finals ==
=== Singles ===
(United States) Linda Wild defeated (Indonesia) Yayuk Basuki by walkover

- It was Wild's only singles title of the year and the 5th and last of her career.

=== Doubles ===
(Japan) Rika Hiraki / (Japan) Naoko Kijimuta defeated (Belgium) Laurence Courtois / (Belgium) Nancy Feber 7–6^{(7–2)}, 7–5

- It was Hiraki's only doubles title of the year and the 3rd of her career. It was Kijimuta's 1st doubles title of the year and of her career.
