= 1997 Japan Open Tennis Championships – Women's singles =

Women's singles
- 1997 Japan Open Tennis Championships

Final
- Champion: (Japan) Ai Sugiyama
- Runner-up: (United States) Amy Frazier
- Score: 4–6, 6–4, 6–4

Details
- Draw: 28 (4 Q / 1 WC )
- Seeds: 8

Events
Singles	men	women
Doubles	men	women
← 1996 ·	Japan Open	· 1998 →

Kimiko Date was the defending champion but did not compete that year.

Ai Sugiyama won in the final 4–6, 6–4, 6–4 against Amy Frazier.

== Seeds ==
A champion seed is indicated in bold text while text in italics indicates the round in which that seed was eliminated. The top two seeds received a bye to the second round.

1. n/a
2. (United States) Kimberly Po (semifinals)
3. (United States) Amy Frazier (final)
4. (Japan) **Ai Sugiyama (champion)**
5. (Chinese Taipei) Shi-Ting Wang (quarterfinals)
6. (Japan) Naoko Sawamatsu (quarterfinals)
7. (Japan) Naoko Kijimuta (second round)
8. (Thailand) Tamarine Tanasugarn (first round)
9. (Australia) Annabel Ellwood (semifinals)

== Draw ==
=== Key ===
- Q = Qualifier
- WC = Wild card
- LL = Lucky loser
- Alt = Alternate
- ITF = ITF entry
- PR = Protected ranking
- SR = Special ranking
- SE = Special exempt
- JE = Junior exempt
- JR = Junior Accelerator Programme entrant
- CO = College Accelerator Programme entrant
- NG = Next Gen Accelerator Program entrant
- w/o = Walkover
- r = Retired
- d = Defaulted

=== Final ===
Final
3	(United States) Amy Frazier	**6**	4	4
4	(Japan) **Ai Sugiyama**	4	**6**	**6**

=== Section 1 ===
First round
(Japan) **R Hiraki**	**6**	5	**6**
(Italy) R Grande	1	**7**	3
Q	(Chinese Taipei) **J Lee**	4	**6**	**6**
LL	(Japan) M Miyauchi	**6**	3	3
(Japan) **M Saeki**	**6**	**6**
8	(Thailand) T Tanasugarn	3	4
3	(United States) **A Frazier**	**6**	**6**
Q	(Japan) Y Hosoki	1	2
(Germany) A Glass	1	1	r
(Japan) **Y Yoshida**	**6**	**4**
(Japan) N Miyagi	0	2
(Japan) **M Endo**	**6**	**6**
LL	(United States) J Chi	3	4
6	(Japan) **N Sawamatsu**	**6**	**6**

Second round
9	(Australia) **A Ellwood**	**6**	3	**6**
(Japan) R Hiraki	0	**6**	4
Q	(Chinese Taipei) **J Lee**	**6**	**6**
(Japan) M Saeki	3	1
3	(United States) **A Frazier**	**6**	**6**
(Japan) Y Yoshida	4	3
(Japan) M Endo	1	**6**	4
6	(Japan) **N Sawamatsu**	**6**	4	**6**

Quarterfinals
9	(Australia) **A Ellwood**	**6**	**6**
Q	(Chinese Taipei) J Lee	1	4
3	(United States) **A Frazier**	**7**	**7**
6	(Japan) N Sawamatsu	6	6

Semifinals
9	(Australia) A Ellwood	2	3
3	(United States) **A Frazier**	**6**	**6**

=== Section 2 ===
First round
7	(Japan) **N Kijimuta**	**6**	**6**
LL	(South Korea) E-H Kim	3	2
(South Korea) S-H Park	3	2
(United States) **C Morariu**	**6**	**6**
(France) A Dechaume-Balleret	4	0
(United States) **M Tu**	**6**	**6**
(United States) G Helgeson-Nielsen	3	5
4	(Japan) **A Sugiyama**	**6**	**7**
5	(Chinese Taipei) **S-T Wang**	**6**	**6**
WC	(Japan) H Inoue	1	1
Q	(Ukraine) E Tatarkova	3	1
(Austria) **K Kschwendt**	**6**	**6**
(United States) **J Watanabe**	**7**	4	**6**
Q	(India) N Vaidyanathan	5	**6**	0

Second round
7	(Japan) N Kijimuta	4	6
(United States) **C Morariu**	**6**	**7**
(United States) M Tu	2	2
4	(Japan) **A Sugiyama**	**6**	**6**
5	(Chinese Taipei) **S-T Wang**	**6**	**6**
(Austria) K Kschwendt	2	4
(United States) J Watanabe	2	2
2	(United States) **K Po**	**6**	**6**

Quarterfinals
(United States) C Morariu	6	2
4	(Japan) **A Sugiyama**	**7**	**6**
5	(Chinese Taipei) S-T Wang	**6**	3	3
2	(United States) **K Po**	4	**6**	**6**

Semifinals
4	(Japan) **A Sugiyama**	5	**6**	**6**
2	(United States) K Po	**7**	4	1
