= 2005 Hansol Korea Open =

- Date: September 26 – October 2
- Edition: 2nd
- Category: WTA Tier IV
- Draw: 32S / 16D
- Prize money: $140,000
- Surface: Hard / outdoor
- Location: Seoul, South Korea

Champions

Singles
- (Czech Republic) Nicole Vaidišová

Doubles
- (Chinese Taipei) Chan Yung-jan / (Chinese Taipei) Chuang Chia-jung
| ← 2004 · | Hansol Korea Open | · 2006 → |

The 2005 Hansol Korea Open Tennis Championships was a women's professional tennis tournament played on hard courts. It was the 3rd edition of the tournament, and part of the 2005 WTA Tour. It took place in Seoul, South Korea between 26 September and 2 October 2005. The prize money was $140,000. Second-seeded Nicole Vaidišová won the singles title.

== Finals ==
=== Singles ===
(Russia) Nicole Vaidišová defeated (Serbia and Montenegro) Jelena Janković 7–5, 6–3

=== Doubles ===
(Chinese Taipei) Chan Yung-jan / (Chinese Taipei) Chuang Chia-jung defeated (United States) Jill Craybas / (South Africa) Natalie Grandin 6–2, 6–4

== Entrants ==
| Country | Player | Rank^{1} | Seed |
|---|---|---|---|
| SCG | Jelena Janković | 17 | 1 |
| CZE | Nicole Vaidišová | 24 | 2 |
| FRA | Tatiana Golovin | 25 | 3 |
| ARG | Gisela Dulko | 29 | 4 |
| JPN | Ai Sugiyama | 32 | 5 |
| RUS | Vera Dushevina | 36 | 6 |
| JPN | ~~Shinobu Asagoe~~ | 39 | 7 |
| FRA | Marion Bartoli | 44 | 8 |
| ISR | Shahar Pe'er | 48 | 9 |

- ^{1} Seeds are based on the rankings of September 19, 2005.

=== Other entrants ===
The following players received wildcards into the singles main draw:

- (South Korea) Chang Kyung-mi
- (South Korea) Kim So-jung

The following players received entry from the qualifying draw:

- (Puerto Rico) Vilmarie Castellvi
- (Czech Republic) Eva Hrdinová
- (Germany) Martina Müller
- (Japan) Saori Obata

=== Withdrawals ===
- (Japan) Shinobu Asagoe (muscle injury during practice)
- (South Korea) Cho Yoon-jeong (back injury during practice)
- (France) Émilie Loit
