= 1998 Japan Open Tennis Championships – Women's doubles =

Women's doubles
- 1998 Japan Open Tennis Championships

Final
- Champions: (Japan) Naoko Kijimuta (Japan) Nana Miyagi
- Runners-up: (United States) Amy Frazier (Japan) Rika Hiraki
- Score: 6–3, 4–6, 6–4

Events
Singles	men	women
Doubles	men	women
← 1997 ·	Japan Open Tennis Championships	· 1999 →

Alexia Dechaume-Balleret and Rika Hiraki were the defending champions but only Hiraki competed that year with Amy Frazier.

Frazier and Hiraki lost in the final 6–3, 4–6, 6–4 against Naoko Kijimuta and Nana Miyagi.

== Seeds ==
Champion seeds are indicated in bold text while text in italics indicates the round in which those seeds were eliminated.

1. (Japan) **Naoko Kijimuta** / (Japan) **Nana Miyagi (champions)**
2. (United States) Amy Frazier / (Japan) Rika Hiraki (final)
3. (Australia) Catherine Barclay / (United States) Lori McNeil (first round)
4. (Australia) Kristine Kunce / (United States) Corina Morariu (semifinals)

== Draw ==
=== Key ===
- Q = Qualifier
- WC = Wild card
- LL = Lucky loser
- Alt = Alternate
- ITF = ITF entry
- PR = Protected ranking
- SR = Special ranking
- SE = Special exempt
- JE = Junior exempt
- JR = Junior Accelerator Programme entrant
- CO = College Accelerator Programme entrant
- NG = Next Gen Accelerator Program entrant
- w/o = Walkover
- r = Retired
- d = Defaulted

First round
1	(Japan) **N Kijimuta** (Japan) **N Miyagi**	**6**	**7**
(South Korea) E-H Kim (Thailand) T Tanasugarn	3	5
(South Africa) **S de Beer** (United States) **G Helgeson-Nielsen**	**6**	2	**7**
(Japan) S Obata (Japan) K Shibata	3	**6**	6
4	(Australia) **K Kunce** (United States) **C Morariu**	**6**	5	**6**
Q	(Australia) G Biggs (Japan) T Hotta	2	**7**	4
WC	(Japan) A Morigami (Japan) K Nagatomi	2	**6**	0
(United States) **E deLone** (Australia) **N Pratt**	**6**	2	**6**
LL	(Japan) R Kawamata (Japan) Y Sasano	1	4
(Chinese Taipei) **J Lee** (Chinese Taipei) **S-T Wang**	**6**	**6**
(South Korea) **M-R Jeon** (Netherlands) **S Noorlander**	5	**7**	**6**
3	(Australia) C Barclay (United States) L McNeil	**7**	6	4
(Japan) H Inoue (Japan) M Inoue	2	4
(Japan) **S Asagoe** (South Korea) **S-H Park**	**6**	**6**
(South Korea) Y-J Cho (South Korea) Y-J Choi	3	2
2	(United States) **A Frazier** (Japan) **R Hiraki**	**6**	**6**

Quarterfinals
1	(Japan) **N Kijimuta** (Japan) **N Miyagi**	**7**	5	**7**
(South Africa) S de Beer (United States) G Helgeson-Nielsen	5	**7**	6
4	(Australia) **K Kunce** (United States) **C Morariu**	**6**	**6**
(United States) E deLone (Australia) N Pratt	4	1
(Chinese Taipei) J Lee (Chinese Taipei) S-T Wang	**7**	5	5
(South Korea) **M-R Jeon** (Netherlands) **S Noorlander**	6	**7**	**7**
(Japan) S Asagoe (South Korea) S-H Park	2	5
2	(United States) **A Frazier** (Japan) **R Hiraki**	**6**	**7**

Semifinals
1	(Japan) **N Kijimuta** (Japan) **N Miyagi**	**6**	**6**
4	(Australia) K Kunce (United States) C Morariu	4	3
(South Korea) M-R Jeon (Netherlands) S Noorlander	2	3
2	(United States) **A Frazier** (Japan) **R Hiraki**	**6**	**6**

Final
1	(Japan) **Naoko Kijimuta** (Japan) **Nana Miyagi**	**6**	4	**6**
2	(United States) Amy Frazier (Japan) Rika Hiraki	3	**6**	4
