= 1996 Danamon Open – Doubles =

Doubles
- 1996 Danamon Open

Final
- Champions: (Japan) Rika Hiraki (Japan) Naoko Kijimuta
- Runners-up: (Belgium) Laurence Courtois (Belgium) Nancy Feber
- Score: 7–6, 7–5

Details
- Draw: 16
- Seeds: 4

Events
Singles	Doubles
← 1995 ·	Danamon Open	· 1997 →

Claudia Porwik and Irina Spîrlea were the defending champions but did not compete that year.

Rika Hiraki and Naoko Kijimuta won in the final 7–6, 7–5 against Laurence Courtois and Nancy Feber.

== Seeds ==
Champion seeds are indicated in bold text while text in italics indicates the round in which those seeds were eliminated.

1. (Australia) Kerry-Anne Guse / (Australia) Kristine Radford (semifinals)
2. (Indonesia) Yayuk Basuki / (United States) Linda Wild (semifinals)
3. (Belgium) Laurence Courtois / (Belgium) Nancy Feber (final)
4. (Germany) Karin Kschwendt / (Canada) Rene Simpson (first round)

== Draw ==
=== Key ===
- Q = Qualifier
- WC = Wild card
- LL = Lucky loser
- Alt = Alternate
- ITF = ITF entry
- PR = Protected ranking
- SR = Special ranking
- SE = Special exempt
- JE = Junior exempt
- JR = Junior Accelerator Programme entrant
- CO = College Accelerator Programme entrant
- NG = Next Gen Accelerator Program entrant
- w/o = Walkover
- r = Retired
- d = Defaulted

First round
1	(Australia) **K-A Guse** (Australia) **K Radford**	**7**	**6**
(United States) C Morariu (Czech Republic) L Varmužová	5	4
Q	(United States) **J Lee** (Thailand) **T Tanasugarn**	**6**	**6**
(Japan) H Nagano (South Korea) S-H Park	3	4
4	(Germany) K Kschwendt (Canada) R Simpson	**6**	3	2
(Japan) **R Hiraki** (Japan) **N Kijimuta**	4	**6**	**6**
(United States) **A Grossman** (United States) **M Werdel-Witmeyer**	**6**	**6**
(Australia) G Biggs (Thailand) B Sangaram	2	1
(Australia) **C Barclay** (United States) **E deLone**	5	**6**	**6**
(Netherlands) P Kamstra (Netherlands) S Noorlander	**7**	3	3
WC	(Indonesia) W Prakusya (Indonesia) E Sulistyowati	2	4
3	(Belgium) **L Courtois** (Belgium) **N Feber**	**6**	**6**
(Finland) N Dahlman (Slovakia) K Studeníková	4	4
(China) **L-L Chen** (Chinese Taipei) **S-T Wang**	**6**	**6**
(Australia) A Ellwood (Australia) R McQuillan	0	**6**	1
2	(Indonesia) **Y Basuki** (United States) **L Wild**	**6**	4	**6**

Quarterfinals
1	(Australia) **K-A Guse** (Australia) **K Radford**	**7**	**6**
Q	(United States) J Lee (Thailand) T Tanasugarn	5	3
(Japan) **R Hiraki** (Japan) **N Kijimuta**	**7**	**6**
(United States) A Grossman (United States) M Werdel-Witmeyer	6	1
(Australia) C Barclay (United States) E deLone	6	3
3	(Belgium) **L Courtois** (Belgium) **N Feber**	**7**	**6**
(China) L-L Chen (Chinese Taipei) S-T Wang	6	4
2	(Indonesia) **Y Basuki** (United States) **L Wild**	**7**	**6**

Semifinals
1	(Australia) K-A Guse (Australia) K Radford	4	2
(Japan) **R Hiraki** (Japan) **N Kijimuta**	**6**	**6**
3	(Belgium) **L Courtois** (Belgium) **N Feber**	**w/o**
2	(Indonesia) Y Basuki (United States) L Wild

Final
(Japan) **Rika Hiraki** (Japan) **Naoko Kijimuta**	**7**	**7**
3	(Belgium) Laurence Courtois (Belgium) Nancy Feber	6	5
