= 1999 Japan Open Tennis Championships – Men's doubles =

Men's doubles
- 1999 Japan Open Tennis Championships

Final
- Champions: (United States) Jeff Tarango (Czech Republic) Daniel Vacek
- Runners-up: (Zimbabwe) Wayne Black (United States) Brian MacPhie
- Score: 4–3, retired

Details
- Draw: 28 (2Q / 3WC)
- Seeds: 8

Events
Singles	men	women
Doubles	men	women
- Japan Open

The 1999 Japan Open Tennis Championships was a tennis tournament played on outdoor hard courts at the Ariake Coliseum in Tokyo, Japan that was part of the International Series Gold of the 1999 ATP Tour. The tournament was held from April 12 through April 18, 1999.

== Seeds ==
Champion seeds are indicated in bold text while text in italics indicates the round in which those seeds were eliminated.

1. (The Bahamas) Mark Knowles / (Canada) Daniel Nestor (second round)
2. (Sweden) Jonas Björkman / (Australia) Mark Woodforde (quarterfinals)
3. (United States) **Jeff Tarango** / (Czech Republic) **Daniel Vacek (champions)**
4. (Czech Republic) Martin Damm / (United States) Patrick Galbraith (quarterfinals)
5. (Australia) Wayne Arthurs / (Canada) Sébastien Lareau (second round)
6. (Zimbabwe) Wayne Black / (United States) Brian MacPhie (final)
7. (Zimbabwe) Byron Black / (South Africa) Wayne Ferreira (first round)
8. (South Africa) Marius Barnard / (South Africa) Brent Haygarth (semifinals)

== Draw ==
Key

- Q = Qualifier
- WC = Wild card
- LL = Lucky loser
- Alt = Alternate
- ITF = ITF entry
- PR = Protected ranking
- SR = Special ranking
- SE = Special exempt
- JE = Junior exempt
- JR = Junior Accelerator Programme entrant
- CO = College Accelerator Programme entrant
- NG = Next Gen Accelerator Program entrant
- w/o = Walkover
- r = Retired
- d = Defaulted

=== Finals ===
Semifinals
(Australia) Michael Hill (United States) Scott Humphries	**6**	3	4
6	(Zimbabwe) **Wayne Black** **(United States) Brian MacPhie**	3	**6**	**6**
3	(United States) **Jeff Tarango** **(Czech Republic) Daniel Vacek**	3	**6**	**7**
8	(South Africa) Marius Barnard (South Africa) Brent Haygarth	**6**	3	5

Final
6	(Zimbabwe) Wayne Black (United States) Brian MacPhie	3^{r}
3	(United States) **Jeff Tarango** **(Czech Republic) Daniel Vacek**	4

=== Top half ===
First round
(Czech Republic) P Luxa (Italy) V Santopadre	3	4
(Netherlands) **S Groen** **(Italy) L Tieleman**	**6**	**6**
(South Africa) **B Talbot** **(South Africa) M Wakefield**	**6**	**7**
WC	(United States) J Salzenstein (Japan) M Takada	3	6
(Australia) **M Hill** **(United States) S Humphries**	**7**	**6**
7	(Zimbabwe) B Black (South Africa) W Ferreira	6	2
Q	(Denmark) **K Carlsen** **(Netherlands) S Schalken**	**7**	6	**6**
WC	(Japan) T Suzuki (Netherlands) P Wessels	6	**7**	4
(New Zealand) J Greenhalgh (Australia) G Silcock	6	2
(Sweden) **T Johansson** **(Sweden) M Tillström**	**7**	**6**
(Japan) Y Ishii (Japan) S Iwabuchi	3	6
6	(Zimbabwe) **W Black** **(United States) B MacPhie**	**6**	**7**

Second round
1	(The Bahamas) M Knowles (Canada) D Nestor	**6**	3	4
(Netherlands) **S Groen** **(Italy) L Tieleman**	3	**6**	**6**
(South Africa) B Talbot (South Africa) M Wakefield	4	6
(Australia) **M Hill** **(United States) S Humphries**	**6**	**7**
4	(Czech Republic) **M Damm** **(United States) P Galbraith**	2	**6**	**7**
Q	(Denmark) K Carlsen (Netherlands) S Schalken	**6**	2	5
(Sweden) T Johansson (Sweden) M Tillström	6	6
6	(Zimbabwe) **W Black** **(United States) B MacPhie**	**7**	**7**

Quarterfinals
(Netherlands) S Groen (Italy) L Tieleman	1	6
(Australia) **M Hill** **(United States) S Humphries**	**6**	**7**
4	(Czech Republic) M Damm (United States) P Galbraith	4	2
6	(Zimbabwe) **W Black** **(United States) B MacPhie**	**6**	**6**

Semifinals
(Australia) M Hill (United States) S Humphries	**6**	3	4
6	(Zimbabwe) **W Black** **(United States) B MacPhie**	3	**6**	**6**

=== Bottom half ===
First round
5	(Australia) **W Arthurs** **(Canada) S Lareau**	**6**	**6**
(Argentina) M Rodríguez (Czech Republic) R Štěpánek	1	4
(Spain) **JI Carrasco** **(Spain) J Velasco Jr.**	**6**	**6**
(Germany) N Kiefer (Germany) D Prinosil	3	2
(United States) **G Grant** **(United States) TJ Middleton**	**6**	**6**
(Germany) M Kohlmann (Switzerland) F Veglio	4	4
8	(South Africa) **M Barnard** **(South Africa) B Haygarth**	**7**	**6**
(Australia) B Ellwood (Australia) M Tebbutt	5	4
WC	(Philippines) **C Mamiit** **(Japan) G Motomura**	3	**7**	**7**
(United States) M Keil (Germany) J Knippschild	**6**	6	6
Q	(Netherlands) D van Scheppingen (Netherlands) R Wassen	6	**7**	3
(United States) **D DiLucia** **(United States) M Sell**	**7**	6	**6**

Second round
5	(Australia) W Arthurs (Canada) S Lareau	6	**7**	6
(Spain) **JI Carrasco** **(Spain) J Velasco Jr.**	**7**	6	**7**
(United States) G Grant (United States) TJ Middleton	**6**	6	2
3	(United States) **J Tarango** **(Czech Republic) D Vacek**	2	**7**	**6**
8	(South Africa) **M Barnard** **(South Africa) B Haygarth**	**7**	**6**
WC	(Philippines) C Mamiit (Japan) G Motomura	5	3
(United States) D DiLucia (United States) M Sell	1	1
2	(Sweden) **J Björkman** **(Australia) M Woodforde**	**6**	**6**

Quarterfinals
(Spain) JI Carrasco (Spain) J Velasco Jr.	**7**	3	6
3	(United States) **J Tarango** **(Czech Republic) D Vacek**	6	**6**	**7**
8	(South Africa) **M Barnard** **(South Africa) B Haygarth**	4	**6**	**6**
2	(Sweden) J Björkman (Australia) M Woodforde	**6**	3	4

Semifinals
3	(United States) **J Tarango** **(Czech Republic) D Vacek**	3	**6**	**7**
8	(South Africa) M Barnard (South Africa) B Haygarth	**6**	3	5
