= 2005 Hansol Korea Open – Doubles =

Doubles
- 2005 Hansol Korea Open

Final
- Champion: (Chinese Taipei) Chan Yung-jan (Chinese Taipei) Chuang Chia-jung
- Runner-up: (United States) Jill Craybas (South Africa) Natalie Grandin
- Score: 6–2, 6–4

Details
- Draw: 16
- Seeds: 4

Events
Singles	Doubles
← 2004 ·	Korea Open	· 2006 →

Jeon Mi-ra and Cho Yoon-jeong were the defending champions from 2004, but both decided not to compete in 2005.

Chan Yung-jan and Chuang Chia-jung won the title.

== Seeds ==
1. (Argentina) Gisela Dulko / (Venezuela) María Vento-Kabchi (first round)
2. (Australia) Lisa McShea / (Australia) Bryanne Stewart (first round)
3. (United States) Laura Granville / (United States) Abigail Spears (semifinals)
4. (France) Marion Bartoli / (Thailand) Tamarine Tanasugarn (first round)

== Draw ==
=== Key ===
- Q = Qualifier
- WC = Wild card
- LL = Lucky loser
- Alt = Alternate
- SE = Special exempt
- PR = Protected ranking
- ITF = ITF entry
- JE = Junior exempt
- w/o = Walkover
- r = Retired
- d = Defaulted
- SR = Special ranking

=== Results ===
First round
1	(Argentina) G Dulko (Venezuela) M Vento-Kabchi	2	2
(Russia) V Douchevina (Israel) S Pe'er	6	6
(Latvia) L Dekmeijere (Germany) M Müller	3	2
Q	(Japan) A Nakamura (Japan) S Obata	6	6
4	(France) M Bartoli (Thailand) T Tanasugarn	4	1	r
WC	(South Korea) K-m Chang (South Korea) M-o Kim	6	4
(France) T Golovin (Serbia and Montenegro) J Janković	4	6	4
(United States) J Craybas (South Africa) N Grandin	6	1	6
(Chinese Taipei) C-w chan (Chinese Taipei) S-w Hsieh	4	4
(South Korea) S-j Kim (Japan) A Sugiyama	6	6
(United States) J Hopkins (United States) M Washington	6^{5}	2
3	(United States) L Granville (United States) A Spears	7	6
(Japan) R Fuda (Japan) S Okamoto	5	1
(Czech Republic) E Hrdinová (Finland) E Laine	7	6
(Chinese Taipei) Y-j Chan (Chinese Taipei) C-j Chuang	6	6
2	(Australia) L McShea (Australia) B Stewart	2	2

Quarterfinals
(Russia) V Douchevina (Israel) S Pe'er	6	6
Q	(Japan) A Nakamura (Japan) S Obata	1	1
WC	(South Korea) K-m Chang (South Korea) M-o Kim	2	5
(United States) J Craybas (South Africa) N Grandin	6	7
(South Korea) S-j Kim (Japan) A Sugiyama	4	5
3	(United States) L Granville (United States) A Spears	6	7
(Czech Republic) E Hrdinová (Finland) E Laine	5	1
(Chinese Taipei) Y-j Chan (Chinese Taipei) C-j Chuang	7	6

Semifinals
(Russia) V Douchevina (Israel) S Pe'er	3	r
(United States) J Craybas (South Africa) N Grandin	6
3	(United States) L Granville (United States) A Spears	4	3
(Chinese Taipei) Y-j Chan (Chinese Taipei) C-j Chuang	6	6

Final
(United States) J Craybas (South Africa) N Grandin	2	4
(Chinese Taipei) Y-j Chan (Chinese Taipei) C-j Chuang	6	6
