= 1999 Japan Open Tennis Championships – Women's singles =

Women's singles
- 1999 Japan Open Tennis Championships

Final
- Champion: (United States) Amy Frazier
- Runner-up: (Japan) Ai Sugiyama
- Score: 6–2, 6–2

Details
- Draw: 32 (4 Q / 2 WC )
- Seeds: 8

Events
Singles	men	women
Doubles	men	women
- Japan Open

The 1999 Japan Open Tennis Championships women's singles was the women's singles event of the twenty-fifth edition of the Japan Open; a WTA Tier III tournament held in Tokyo, Japan. Ai Sugiyama was the defending champion but lost in the final 6–2, 6–2 against Amy Frazier.

== Seeds ==
1. (Japan) Ai Sugiyama (final)
2. (United States) Amy Frazier (champion)
3. (United States) Corina Morariu (semifinals)
4. (United States) Kimberly Po (second round)
5. (Puerto Rico) Kristina Brandi (first round)
6. (United States) Meghann Shaughnessy (first round)
7. (United States) Jane Chi (semifinals)
8. (Chinese Taipei) Wang Shi-ting (quarterfinals)

== Draw ==
Key

- Q = Qualifier
- WC = Wild card
- LL = Lucky loser
- Alt = Alternate
- ITF = ITF entry
- PR = Protected ranking
- SR = Special ranking
- SE = Special exempt
- JE = Junior exempt
- JR = Junior Accelerator Programme entrant
- CO = College Accelerator Programme entrant
- NG = Next Gen Accelerator Program entrant
- w/o = Walkover
- r = Retired
- d = Defaulted

=== Finals ===
Semifinals
1	(Japan) Ai Sugiyama	7^{7}	6
7	(United States) Jane Chi	6^{5}	3
3	(United States) Corina Morariu	4	7	3
2	(United States) Amy Frazier	6	5	6

Final
1	(Japan) Ai Sugiyama	2	2
2	(United States) Amy Frazier	6	6

=== Top half ===
First round
1	(Japan) A Sugiyama	6	6
LL	(Indonesia) W Prakusya	1	3
(Czech Republic) L Němečková	7	6
Q	(United States) K Schlukebir	5	4
(United States) S Reeves	2	2
(Chinese Taipei) J Lee	6	6
(United States) J Watanabe	6	6
5	(Puerto Rico) K Brandi	4	2
4	(United States) K Po	7	6
(Japan) M Saeki	5	2
(South Korea) S-h Park	4	2
(Czech Republic) S Kleinová	6	6
Q	(Japan) M Miyauchi	6	3	4
(South Africa) S de Beer	4	6	6
Q	(South Korea) Y-j Cho	4	1
7	(United States) J Chi	6	6

Second round
1	(Japan) A Sugiyama	6	6
(Czech Republic) L Němečková	4	1
(Chinese Taipei) J Lee	7^{7}	6
(United States) J Watanabe	6^{4}	3
4	(United States) K Po	5	6	3
(Czech Republic) S Kleinová	7	4	6
(South Africa) S de Beer	4	3
7	(United States) J Chi	6	6

Quarterfinals
1	(Japan) A Sugiyama	6	6
(Chinese Taipei) J Lee	4	0
(Czech Republic) S Kleinová	2	0^{r}
7	(United States) J Chi	6	3

Semifinals
1	(Japan) A Sugiyama	7^{7}	6
7	(United States) J Chi	6^{5}	3

=== Bottom half ===
First round
8	(Chinese Taipei) S-t Wang	6	6
WC	(Japan) S Obata	4	2
(Netherlands) S Noorlander	4	6^{5}
(Japan) Y Yoshida	6	7^{7}
(United States) M Washington	6	6
Q	(United Kingdom) H Collin	3	4
(Austria) M Maruska	3	2
3	(United States) C Morariu	6	6
6	(United States) M Shaughnessy	3	5
(United States) M Tu	6	7
(United States) L Wild	3	1
WC	(Japan) S Asagoe	6	6
(France) L Andretto	4	3
(Australia) K-A Guse	6	6
(Japan) H Inoue	0	3
2	(United States) A Frazier	6	6

Second round
8	(Chinese Taipei) S-t Wang	6	6
(Japan) Y Yoshida	1	4
(United States) M Washington	2	0
3	(United States) C Morariu	6	6
(United States) M Tu	2	6	6
WC	(Japan) S Asagoe	6	3	3
(Australia) K-A Guse	6^{3}	0
2	(United States) A Frazier	7^{7}	6

Quarterfinals
8	(Chinese Taipei) S-t Wang	7^{7}	3	4
3	(United States) C Morariu	6^{3}	6	6
(United States) M Tu	7	4	4
2	(United States) A Frazier	5	6	6

Semifinals
3	(United States) C Morariu	4	7	3
2	(United States) A Frazier	6	5	6

== Qualifying ==
=== Seeds ===
1. (Indonesia) Wynne Prakusya (qualifying competition, lucky loser)
2. (South Korea) Kim Eun-ha (second round)
3. (South Korea) Cho Yoon-jeong (qualifier)
4. (United States) Katie Schlukebir (qualifier)
5. (Japan) Misumi Miyauchi (qualifier)
6. (Japan) Akiko Morigami (second round)
7. (Japan) Tomoe Hotta (first round)
8. (Hungary) Adrienn Hegedűs (first round)

=== Qualifiers ===
1. (Japan) Misumi Miyauchi
2. (South Korea) Cho Yoon-jeong
3. (United States) Katie Schlukebir
4. (United Kingdom) Hannah Collin

=== Lucky losers ===
1. (Indonesia) Wynne Prakusya

== Qualifying draw ==
Key

- Q = Qualifier
- WC = Wild card
- LL = Lucky loser
- Alt = Alternate
- ITF = ITF entry
- PR = Protected ranking
- SR = Special ranking
- SE = Special exempt
- JE = Junior exempt
- JR = Junior Accelerator Programme entrant
- CO = College Accelerator Programme entrant
- NG = Next Gen Accelerator Program entrant
- w/o = Walkover
- r = Retired
- d = Defaulted

=== First qualifier ===
First round
1	(Indonesia) Wynne Prakusya	6	6
(Japan) Keiko Tameishi	0	0
(Japan) Yoshiko Sasano	6	7
(Japan) Miyako Ataka	1	5
(Japan) Shiho Hisamatsu	2
(Japan) Akiko Gunji	1^{r}
(Japan) Sachie Umehara	6	4	1
5	(Japan) Misumi Miyauchi	2	6	6

Second round
1	(Indonesia) Wynne Prakusya	6	7^{9}
(Japan) Yoshiko Sasano	4	6^{7}
(Japan) Shiho Hisamatsu	7	2	1
5	(Japan) Misumi Miyauchi	5	6	6

Qualifying competition
1	(Indonesia) Wynne Prakusya	3	2
5	(Japan) Misumi Miyauchi	6	6

=== Second qualifier ===
First round
3	(South Korea) Cho Yoon-jeong	6	6
(Japan) Madoka Kuki	2	0
(Japan) Maiko Inoue	6	6
(Japan) Kazue Takuma	2	0
(Japan) Keiko Nagatomi	6	6
WC	(Japan) Yumi Yokoi	3	2
(Uzbekistan) Iroda Tulyaganova	6	6
8	(Hungary) Adrienn Hegedűs	3	2

Second round
3	(South Korea) Cho Yoon-jeong	6	6
(Japan) Maiko Inoue	2	4
(Japan) Keiko Nagatomi	0	4
(Uzbekistan) Iroda Tulyaganova	6	6

Qualifying competition
3	(South Korea) Cho Yoon-jeong	6	6
(Uzbekistan) Iroda Tulyaganova	4	3

=== Third qualifier ===
First round
7	(Japan) Tomoe Hotta	6	2	6^{3}
(Japan) Akiko Kinebuchi	4	6	7^{7}
(Japan) Hiroko Mochizuki	1	6	6
(Japan) Riei Otakeyama	6	3	4
(Japan) Seiko Okamoto	4	6	6
(Thailand) Benjamas Sangaram	6	4	1
(Japan) Nami Urabe	3	3
4	(United States) Katie Schlukebir	6	6

Second round
(Japan) Akiko Kinebuchi	6	6
(Japan) Hiroko Mochizuki	1	3
(Japan) Seiko Okamoto	3	0
4	(United States) Katie Schlukebir	6	6

Qualifying competition
(Japan) Akiko Kinebuchi	5	4
4	(United States) Katie Schlukebir	7	6

=== Fourth qualifier ===
First round
6	(Japan) Akiko Morigami	6	6
(Japan) Keiko Ishida	0	2
(United Kingdom) Hannah Collin	6	6
WC	(Japan) Eri Ohmi	0	2
(Japan) Chiaki Nakajima	1	7^{9}	3
WC	(Japan) Keiko Taguchi	6	6^{7}	6
WC	(Japan) Kaori Goto	4	1
2	(South Korea) Kim Eun-ha	6	6

Second round
6	(Japan) Akiko Morigami	6	4	1
(United Kingdom) Hannah Collin	1	6	6
WC	(Japan) Keiko Taguchi	6	2	6
2	(South Korea) Kim Eun-ha	4	6	4

Qualifying competition
(United Kingdom) Hannah Collin	6	6
WC	(Japan) Keiko Taguchi	0	2
