= 2004 Hansol Korea Open =

- Date: 27 September – 3 October
- Edition: 1st
- Category: Tier IV
- Draw: 32S / 16D
- Prize money: $140,000
- Surface: Hard / outdoor
- Location: Seoul, South Korea

Champions

Singles
- (Russia) Maria Sharapova

Doubles
- (South Korea) Cho Yoon-jeong / (South Korea) Jeon Mi-ra
Hansol Korea Open	· 2005 →

The 2004 Hansol Korea Open Tennis Championships was a women's professional tennis tournament played on hard courts. It was the first edition of the tournament, and part of the Tier IV category of the 2004 WTA Tour. It took place in Seoul, South Korea between 27 September and 32 October 2004. The prize money was $140,000. First-seeded Maria Sharapova won the inaugural edition of the tournament.

== Finals ==
=== Singles ===
(Russia) Maria Sharapova defeated (Poland) Marta Domachowska 6–1, 6–1

- It was Sharapova's 3rd singles title of the year and the 5th of her career.

=== Doubles ===
(South Korea) Cho Yoon-jeong / (South Korea) Jeon Mi-ra defeated (Chinese Taipei) Chuang Chia-jung / (Chinese Taipei) Hsieh Su-wei 6–3, 1–6, 7–5
