= 1997 Danamon Open – Singles =

Singles
- 1997 Danamon Open

Final
- Champion: (Japan) Naoko Sawamatsu
- Runner-up: (Japan) Yuka Yoshida
- Score: 6–3, 6–2

Details
- Draw: 32
- Seeds: 8

Events
Singles	Doubles
← 1996 ·	Danamon Open

Linda Wild was the defending champion but did not compete that year.

Naoko Sawamatsu won in the final 6–3, 6–2 against Yuka Yoshida.

== Seeds ==
A champion seed is indicated in bold text while text in italics indicates the round in which that seed was eliminated.

1. (Chinese Taipei) Shi-Ting Wang (quarterfinals)
2. (Japan) **Naoko Sawamatsu (champion)**
3. (Thailand) Tamarine Tanasugarn (first round)
4. (Japan) Naoko Kijimuta (second round)
5. (Australia) Annabel Ellwood (first round)
6. (Italy) Rita Grande (semifinals)
7. (Japan) Yuka Yoshida (final)
8. (United States) Meilen Tu (first round)

== Draw ==
=== Key ===
- Q = Qualifier
- WC = Wild card
- LL = Lucky loser
- Alt = Alternate
- ITF = ITF entry
- PR = Protected ranking
- SR = Special ranking
- SE = Special exempt
- JE = Junior exempt
- JR = Junior Accelerator Programme entrant
- CO = College Accelerator Programme entrant
- NG = Next Gen Accelerator Program entrant
- w/o = Walkover
- r = Retired
- d = Defaulted

First round
1	(Chinese Taipei) **S-T Wang**	**6**	**6**
(Japan) M Endo	2	1
Q	(Australia) J Taylor	4	5
WC	(Indonesia) **L Andriyani**	**6**	**7**
(United States) **J Chi**	**6**	**6**
WC	(Ukraine) D Chernova	1	0
(India) N Vaidyanathan	3	2
7	(Japan) **Y Yoshida**	**6**	**6**
4	(Japan) **N Kijimuta**	**6**	**6**
(Chinese Taipei) J Lee	1	3
Q	(South Korea) M-R Jeon	4	1
(France) **A D-Balleret**	**6**	**6**
(United States) G Helgeson-Nielsen	2	4
Q	(South Korea) **E-H Kim**	**6**	**6**
LL	(Japan) **Y Hosoki**	**6**	0	**6**
5	(Australia) A Ellwood	2	**6**	3
6	(Italy) **R Grande**	**6**	4	**6**
(Australia) K Radford	3	**6**	2
(South Korea) S-H Park	1	2
(Czech Republic) **L Němečková**	**6**	**6**
(Germany) M Weingärtner	3	**6**	2
(Japan) **H Inoue**	**6**	4	**6**
(Belgium) **N Feber**	**7**	**6**
3	(Thailand) T Tanasugarn	6	1
8	(United States) M Tu	4	**6**	3
(Japan) **R Hiraki**	**6**	1	**6**
(Japan) **N Miyagi**	**7**	**6**
(Ukraine) E Tatarkova	6	3
Q	(Japan) M Miyauchi	5	2
(Australia) **K-A Guse**	**7**	**6**
(United States) C Morariu	0	**6**	4
2	(Japan) **N Sawamatsu**	**6**	3	**6**

Second round
1	(Chinese Taipei) **S-T Wang**	**6**	4	**6**
WC	(Indonesia) L Andriyani	1	**6**	3
(United States) J Chi	6	3
7	(Japan) **Y Yoshida**	**7**	**6**
4	(Japan) N Kijimuta	0	4
(France) **A D-Balleret**	**6**	**6**
Q	(South Korea) **E-H Kim**	**6**	**6**
LL	(Japan) Y Hosoki	2	1
6	(Italy) **R Grande**	**6**	**6**
(Czech Republic) L Němečková	4	0
(Japan) H Inoue	4	6
(Belgium) **N Feber**	**6**	**7**
(Japan) R Hiraki	4	**6**	2
(Japan) **N Miyagi**	**6**	3	**6**
(Australia) K-A Guse	3	0
2	(Japan) **N Sawamatsu**	**6**	**6**

Quarterfinals
1	(Chinese Taipei) S-T Wang	4	2	r
7	(Japan) **Y Yoshida**	**6**	**3**
(France) **A D-Balleret**	**6**	**6**
Q	(South Korea) E-H Kim	4	2
6	(Italy) **R Grande**	**w/o**
(Belgium) N Feber
(Japan) N Miyagi	5	1
2	(Japan) **N Sawamatsu**	**7**	**6**

Semifinals
7	(Japan) **Y Yoshida**	3	**7**	**6**
(France) A D-Balleret	**6**	6	1
6	(Italy) R Grande	6	**6**	1
2	(Japan) **N Sawamatsu**	**7**	3	**6**

Final
7	(Japan) Yuka Yoshida	3	2
2	(Japan) **Naoko Sawamatsu**	**6**	**6**
