= 1999 Japan Open Tennis Championships – Women's doubles =

Women's doubles
- 1999 Japan Open Tennis Championships

Final
- Champions: (United States) Corina Morariu (United States) Kimberly Po
- Runners-up: (Australia) Catherine Barclay (Australia) Kerry-Anne Guse
- Score: 6–3, 6–2

Events
Singles	men	women
Doubles	men	women
- Japan Open Tennis Championships

The 1999 Japan Open Tennis Championships women's doubles was the women's doubles event of the twenty-fifth edition of the Japan Open; a WTA Tier III tournament held in Tokyo, Japan. Naoko Kijimuta and Nana Miyagi were the defending champions but did not compete that year.

Corina Morariu and Kimberly Po won in the final 6–3, 6–2 against Catherine Barclay and Kerry-Anne Guse.

== Seeds ==
1. (United States) Corina Morariu / (United States) Kimberly Po (champions)
2. (Australia) Catherine Barclay / (Australia) Kerry-Anne Guse (final)
3. (United States) Amy Frazier / (United States) Katie Schlukebir (semifinals)
4. (Japan) Miho Saeki / (Japan) Yuka Yoshida (semifinals)

== Draw ==
Key

- Q = Qualifier
- WC = Wild card
- LL = Lucky loser
- Alt = Alternate
- ITF = ITF entry
- PR = Protected ranking
- SR = Special ranking
- SE = Special exempt
- JE = Junior exempt
- JR = Junior Accelerator Programme entrant
- CO = College Accelerator Programme entrant
- NG = Next Gen Accelerator Program entrant
- w/o = Walkover
- r = Retired
- d = Defaulted

=== Finals ===
First round
1	(United States) C Morariu (United States) K Po	7^{9}	6
(Chinese Taipei) J Lee (United States) L Wild	6^{7}	2
(Japan) K Ishida (Japan) K Nagatomi	6	6
(United States) J Chi (United States) M Washington	3	3
4	(Japan) M Saeki (Japan) Y Yoshida	7^{7}	6
(South Africa) S de Beer (Thailand) B Sangaram	6^{5}	1
(South Korea) S-h Park (Chinese Taipei) S-t Wang	7	6
(South Korea) Y-j Cho (Indonesia) W Prakusya	5	2
WC	(Japan) H Inoue (Japan) M Inoue	1	4
(Czech Republic) L Němečková (United States) M Tu	6	6
(Japan) H Mochizuki (Japan) K Takuma	5	3
3	(United States) A Frazier (United States) K Schlukebir	7	6
(Japan) S Asagoe (Japan) S Obata	6	6
(United States) S Reeves (United States) J Watanabe	2	3
(Japan) T Hotta (South Korea) E-h Kim	2	3
2	(Australia) C Barclay (Australia) K-A Guse	6	6

Quarterfinals
1	(United States) C Morariu (United States) K Po	6	6
(Japan) K Ishida (Japan) K Nagatomi	1	1
4	(Japan) M Saeki (Japan) Y Yoshida	2	6	6
(South Korea) S-h Park (Chinese Taipei) S-t Wang	6	2	2
(Czech Republic) L Němečková (United States) M Tu	3	3
3	(United States) A Frazier (United States) K Schlukebir	6	6
(Japan) S Asagoe (Japan) S Obata	1	3
2	(Australia) C Barclay (Australia) K-A Guse	6	6

Semifinals
1	(United States) C Morariu (United States) K Po	6	6
4	(Japan) M Saeki (Japan) Y Yoshida	2	3
3	(United States) A Frazier (United States) K Schlukebir	4	0
2	(Australia) C Barclay (Australia) K-A Guse	6	6

Final
1	(United States) C Morariu (United States) K Po	6	6
2	(Australia) C Barclay (Australia) K-A Guse	3	2
