= 1997 Japan Open Tennis Championships – Men's doubles =

Men's doubles
- 1997 Japan Open Tennis Championships

Final
- Champions: (Czech Republic) Martin Damm (Czech Republic) Daniel Vacek
- Runners-up: (United States) Justin Gimelstob (Australia) Patrick Rafter
- Score: 2–6, 6–2, 7–6

Details
- Draw: 28 (1Q / 4WC)
- Seeds: 8

Events
| Singles | men | women |
| Doubles | men | women |
- Japan Open

Todd Woodbridge and Mark Woodforde were the defending champions, but lost in the quarterfinals to tournament runners-up Justin Gimelstob and Patrick Rafter.

Martin Damm and Daniel Vacek won the title by defeating Gimelstob and Rafter 2–6, 6–2, 7–6 in the final.

== Seeds ==
The first four seeds received a bye to the second round.

1. (Australia) Todd Woodbridge / (Australia) Mark Woodforde (quarterfinals)
2. (United States) Rick Leach / (United States) Jonathan Stark (second round)
3. (South Africa) David Adams / (Russia) Andrei Olhovskiy (second round)
4. (Czech Republic) Martin Damm / (Czech Republic) Daniel Vacek (champion)
5. (Australia) Joshua Eagle / (Australia) Andrew Florent (semifinals)
6. (United States) Jim Grabb / (United States) Brian MacPhie (quarterfinals)
7. (United States) Justin Gimelstob / (Australia) Patrick Rafter (final)
8. (Belarus) Max Mirnyi / (Zimbabwe) Kevin Ullyett (first round)

== Draw ==
Key

- Q = Qualifier
- WC = Wild card
- LL = Lucky loser
- Alt = Alternate
- ITF = ITF entry
- PR = Protected ranking
- SR = Special ranking
- SE = Special exempt
- JE = Junior exempt
- JR = Junior Accelerator Programme entrant
- CO = College Accelerator Programme entrant
- NG = Next Gen Accelerator Program entrant
- w/o = Walkover
- r = Retired
- d = Defaulted

=== Finals ===
Semifinals
7 | (United States) Justin Gimelstob (Australia) Patrick Rafter | 4 | 6 | 6
5 | (Australia) Joshua Eagle (Australia) Andrew Florent | 6 | 3 | 3
4 | (Czech Republic) Martin Damm (Czech Republic) Daniel Vacek | 6 | 6
(Australia) Wayne Arthurs (Australia) Andrew Kratzmann | 4 | 4

Final
7 | (United States) Justin Gimelstob (Australia) Patrick Rafter | 6 | 2 | 6
4 | (Czech Republic) Martin Damm (Czech Republic) Daniel Vacek | 2 | 6 | 7

=== Top half ===
First round
(Sweden) M Norman (Sweden) T Nydahl | 3 | 7 | 6
Q | (United Kingdom) J Delgado (Germany) A Thoms | 6 | 6 | 4
WC | (Germany) B Becker (Germany) P Kühnen | 6 | 6 | 4
WC | (Japan) Hiroki Ishii (Japan) M Onoda | 1 | 7 | 6
(United Kingdom) A Richardson (United Kingdom) D Sapsford | 4 | 6 | 3
7 | (United States) J Gimelstob (Australia) P Rafter | 6 | 3 | 6
(Austria) G Blumauer (United Kingdom) A Foster | 4 | 3
(France) JP Fleurian (France) S Simian | 6 | 6
(Netherlands) F Wibier (Netherlands) J Winnink | 4 | 3
(India) L Paes (The Bahamas) R Smith | 6 | 6
(United States) K Jones (United States) S Melville | 2 | 5
5 | (Australia) J Eagle (Australia) A Florent | 6 | 7

Second round
1 | (Australia) T Woodbridge (Australia) M Woodforde | 6 | 2
(Sweden) M Norman (Sweden) T Nydahl | 1 | 0^{r}
WC | (Japan) Hiroki Ishii (Japan) M Onoda | 2 | 7 | 3
7 | (United States) J Gimelstob (Australia) P Rafter | 6 | 6 | 6
3 | (South Africa) D Adams (Russia) A Olhovskiy | 5 | 5
(France) JP Fleurian (France) S Simian | 7 | 7
(India) L Paes (The Bahamas) R Smith | 2 | 4
5 | (Australia) J Eagle (Australia) A Florent | 6 | 6

Quarterfinals
1 | (Australia) T Woodbridge (Australia) M Woodforde | 3 | 7 | 6
7 | (United States) J Gimelstob (Australia) P Rafter | 6 | 6 | 7
(France) JP Fleurian (France) S Simian | 4 | 5
5 | (Australia) J Eagle (Australia) A Florent | 6 | 7

Semifinals
7 | (United States) J Gimelstob (Australia) P Rafter | 4 | 6 | 6
5 | (Australia) J Eagle (Australia) A Florent | 6 | 3 | 3

=== Bottom half ===
First round
6 | (United States) J Grabb (United States) B MacPhie | 6 | 5 | 6
(Germany) K Braasch (United States) J Tarango | 4 | 7 | 4
(South Africa) N Godwin (Sweden) H Holm | 6 | 7
(Romania) A Pavel (Israel) E Ran | 3 | 6
WC | (United States) M Joyce (Japan) S Matsuoka | 6 | 4 | 7
(South Africa) C Ferreira (France) J Golmard | 1 | 6 | 6
8 | (Belarus) M Mirnyi (Zimbabwe) K Ullyett | 6 | 3 | 2
(United States) D Flach (United States) K Kinnear | 1 | 6 | 6
WC | (Japan) G Motomura (Japan) T Shimada | 6 | 2
(Australia) W Arthurs (Australia) A Kratzmann | 7 | 6
(France) O Delaître (France) L Roux | 7 | 1 | 1
(Japan) S Iwabuchi (Japan) T Suzuki | 6 | 6 | 6

Second round
6 | (United States) J Grabb (United States) B MacPhie | 6 | 6
(South Africa) N Godwin (Sweden) H Holm | 4 | 2
WC | (United States) M Joyce (Japan) S Matsuoka | 6 | 3 | 2
4 | (Czech Republic) M Damm (Czech Republic) D Vacek | 4 | 6 | 6
(United States) D Flach (United States) K Kinnear | 6 | 3 | 6
(Australia) W Arthurs (Australia) A Kratzmann | 4 | 6 | 7
(Japan) S Iwabuchi (Japan) T Suzuki | 6 | 6
2 | (United States) R Leach (United States) J Stark | 2 | 4

Quarterfinals
6 | (United States) J Grabb (United States) B MacPhie | 6 | 6 | 6
4 | (Czech Republic) M Damm (Czech Republic) D Vacek | 3 | 7 | 7
(Australia) W Arthurs (Australia) A Kratzmann | 7 | 4 | 6
(Japan) S Iwabuchi (Japan) T Suzuki | 5 | 6 | 3

Semifinals
4 | (Czech Republic) M Damm (Czech Republic) D Vacek | 6 | 6
(Australia) W Arthurs (Australia) A Kratzmann | 4 | 4
