= 2004 Hansol Korea Open – Doubles =

Doubles
- 2004 Hansol Korea Open

Final
- Champions: (South Korea) Cho Yoon-jeong (South Korea) Jeon Mi-ra
- Runners-up: (Chinese Taipei) Chuang Chia-jung (Chinese Taipei) Hsieh Su-wei
- Score: 6–3, 1–6, 7–5

Details
- Draw: 16
- Seeds: 4

Events
Singles	Doubles
Korea Open	· 2005 →

This was the tournament's first edition.

Cho Yoon-jeong and Jeon Mi-ra won the title, by defeating Chuang Chia-jung and Hsieh Su-wei 6–3, 1–6, 7–5 in the final. It was the 1st and only title for both players in their respective careers.

== Seeds ==
1. (Japan) Shinobu Asagoe / (Slovenia) Katarina Srebotnik (quarterfinals)
2. (Venezuela) Milagros Sequera / (United States) Mashona Washington (semifinals)
3. (Australia) Bryanne Stewart / (Australia) Samantha Stosur (quarterfinals)
4. (Italy) Adriana Serra Zanetti / (Croatia) Silvija Talaja (first round)

== Draw ==
=== Key ===
- Q = Qualifier
- WC = Wild card
- LL = Lucky loser
- Alt = Alternate
- SE = Special exempt
- PR = Protected ranking
- ITF = ITF entry
- JE = Junior exempt
- w/o = Walkover
- r = Retired
- d = Defaulted
- SR = Special ranking

=== Draw ===
First round
1	(Japan) S Asagoe (Slovenia) K Srebotnik	6	6
(Japan) S Obata (United States) S Rao	2	1
(Poland) M Domachowska (Italy) An Serra Zanetti	6	6
(United States) A Spears (Russia) G Voskoboeva	2	3
4	(Italy) Ad Serra Zanetti (Croatia) S Talaja	6^{2}	0
(South Korea) Y-j Cho (South Korea) M-r Jeon	7^{7}	6
(South Korea) K-m Chang (South Korea) J-h Kim	6	4	4
(Chinese Taipei) C-w Chan (Japan) A Takase	2	6	6
(Chinese Taipei) C-j Chuang (Chinese Taipei) S-w Hsieh	4	6	6
WC	(South Korea) S-j Kim (South Korea) S-m Yoo	6	1	3
(Slovakia) Ľ Kurhajcová (Czech Republic) L Němečková	4	6	0
3	(Australia) B Stewart (Australia) S Stosur	6	2	6
(Poland) K Jans (Poland) A Rosolska	2	7	3
(Japan) S Okamoto (Japan) M Saeki	6	5	6
Q	(Luxembourg) A Kremer (Israel) A Pe'er	2	2
2	(Venezuela) M Sequera (United States) M Washington	6	6

Quarterfinals
1	(Japan) S Asagoe (Slovenia) K Srebotnik	6	1	7^{7}
(Poland) M Domachowska (Italy) An Serra Zanetti	2	6	6^{5}
(South Korea) Y-j Cho (South Korea) M-r Jeon	6	7
(Chinese Taipei) C-w Chan (Japan) A Takase	2	5
(Chinese Taipei) C-j Chuang (Chinese Taipei) S-w Hsieh	6	7
3	(Australia) B Stewart (Australia) S Stosur	2	5
(Japan) S Okamoto (Japan) M Saeki	3	6^{10}
2	(Venezuela) M Sequera (United States) M Washington	6	7^{12}

Semifinals
(Poland) M Domachowska (Italy) An Serra Zanetti	4	7^{7}	3
(South Korea) Y-j Cho (South Korea) M-r Jeon	6	6^{5}	6
(Chinese Taipei) C-j Chuang (Chinese Taipei) S-w Hsieh	7^{7}	6
2	(Venezuela) M Sequera (United States) M Washington	6^{5}	2

Final
(South Korea) Y-j Cho (South Korea) M-r Jeon	6	1	7
(Chinese Taipei) C-j Chuang (Chinese Taipei) S-w Hsieh	3	6	5
