= 2006 Hansol Korea Open – Doubles =

Doubles
- 2006 Hansol Korea Open

Final
- Champions: (Spain) Virginia Ruano Pascual (Argentina) Paola Suárez
- Runners-up: (Chinese Taipei) Chuang Chia-jung (Argentina) Mariana Díaz Oliva
- Score: 6–2, 6–3

Details
- Draw: 16
- Seeds: 4

Events
Singles	Doubles
← 2005 ·	Korea Open	· 2007 →

Chan Yung-jan and Chuang Chia-jung were the defending doubles champions at the Korea Open, but Chan did not compete this year. Chuang teamed up with Mariana Díaz Oliva and lost in the final to Virginia Ruano Pascual and Paola Suárez, 6–2, 6–3.

== Seeds ==
1. (Spain) Virginia Ruano Pascual / (Argentina) Paola Suárez (champions)
2. (Russia) Vera Dushevina / (Russia) Vera Zvonareva (semifinals)
3. (Argentina) Gisela Dulko / (Finland) Emma Laine (quarterfinals)
4. (France) Séverine Brémond / (Greece) Eleni Daniilidou (first round, retired due to an abdominal strain on Brémond)

== Draw ==
=== Key ===
- Q = Qualifier
- WC = Wild card
- LL = Lucky loser
- Alt = Alternate
- SE = Special exempt
- PR = Protected ranking
- ITF = ITF entry
- JE = Junior exempt
- w/o = Walkover
- r = Retired
- d = Defaulted
- SR = Special ranking

=== Draw ===
First round
1	(Spain) V Ruano Pascual (Argentina) P Suárez	6	6
(Romania) R Olaru (Denmark) C Wozniacki	2	0
(South Africa) N Grandin (Japan) A Nakamura	3	2
(South Korea) K-m Chang (South Korea) Y-r Lee	6	6
4	(France) S Brémond (Greece) E Daniilidou	6^{7}	1^{r}
(Colombia) C Castaño (United States) J Craybas	7^{9}	3
(Croatia) S Ančić (United States) J Elie	1	6^{3}
(Venezuela) M Vento-Kabchi (Indonesia) A Widjaja	6	7^{7}
(South Korea) J-h Kim (South Korea) S-h Han	2	1
(Chinese Taipei) C-j Chuang (Argentina) M Díaz Oliva	6	6
(South Korea) S-j Kim (Japan) A Sugiyama	4	6^{2}
3	(Argentina) G Dulko (Finland) E Laine	6	7^{7}
(Poland) M Domachowska (Czech Republic) L Šafářová	4	2
(Japan) A Morigami (United States) M Tu	6	6
(United States) L Osterloh (France) C Pin	2	1
2	(Russia) V Dushevina (Russia) V Zvonareva	6	6

Quarterfinals
1	(Spain) V Ruano Pascual (Argentina) P Suárez	6	6
(South Korea) K-m Chang (South Korea) Y-r Lee	1	3
(Colombia) C Castaño (United States) J Craybas	3	6	6^{6}
(Venezuela) M Vento-Kabchi (Indonesia) A Widjaja	6	4	7^{8}
(Chinese Taipei) C-j Chuang (Argentina) M Díaz Oliva	6	6
3	(Argentina) G Dulko (Finland) E Laine	4	4
(Japan) A Morigami (United States) M Tu	3	3
2	(Russia) V Dushevina (Russia) V Zvonareva	6	6

Semifinals
1	(Spain) V Ruano Pascual (Argentina) P Suárez	5	6	6
(Venezuela) M Vento-Kabchi (Indonesia) A Widjaja	7	1	1
(Chinese Taipei) C-j Chuang (Argentina) M Díaz Oliva	6	3	6
2	(Russia) V Dushevina (Russia) V Zvonareva	3	6	4

Final
1	(Spain) V Ruano Pascual (Argentina) P Suárez	6	6
(Chinese Taipei) C-j Chuang (Argentina) M Díaz Oliva	2	3
