= 1996 Danamon Open – Singles =

Singles
- 1996 Danamon Open

Final
- Champion: (United States) Linda Wild
- Runner-up: (Indonesia) Yayuk Basuki
- Score: Walkover

Details
- Draw: 32
- Seeds: 8

Events
Singles	Doubles
← 1995 ·	Danamon Open	· 1997 →

Sabine Hack was the defending champion but did not compete that year.

Linda Wild won the final on a walkover against Yayuk Basuki.

== Seeds ==
A champion seed is indicated in bold text while text in italics indicates the round in which that seed was eliminated.

1. (Belgium) Sabine Appelmans (quarterfinals)
2. (Chinese Taipei) Shi-Ting Wang (first round)
3. (Indonesia) Yayuk Basuki (final)
4. (United States) Marianne Werdel-Witmeyer (second round)
5. (United States) **Linda Wild (champion)**
6. (Germany) Karin Kschwendt (second round)
7. (Belgium) Laurence Courtois (semifinals)
8. (United States) Ann Grossman (second round)

== Draw ==
=== Key ===
- Q = Qualifier
- WC = Wild card
- LL = Lucky loser
- Alt = Alternate
- ITF = ITF entry
- PR = Protected ranking
- SR = Special ranking
- SE = Special exempt
- JE = Junior exempt
- JR = Junior Accelerator Programme entrant
- CO = College Accelerator Programme entrant
- NG = Next Gen Accelerator Program entrant
- w/o = Walkover
- r = Retired
- d = Defaulted

First round
1	(Belgium) **S Appelmans**	**7**	**6**
(Austria) B Reinstadler	6	1
(Canada) **J Nejedly**	**7**	**6**
(France) N Dechy	5	3
(Australia) R McQuillan	2	4
(Japan) **N Kijimuta**	**6**	**6**
(Netherlands) P Kamstra	**6**	2	2
8	(United States) **A Grossman**	2	**6**	**6**
4	(United States) **M Werdel-Witmeyer**	2	**6**	**6**
(Hong Kong) M Tang	**6**	4	3
(Japan) **R Hiraki**	**7**	**7**
(Finland) N Dahlman	5	6
(Slovakia) **K Studeníková**	**6**	**6**
(South Korea) S-H Park	4	3
Q	(Japan) M Saeki	3	4
5	(United States) **L Wild**	**6**	**6**
6	(Germany) **K Kschwendt**	**6**	**6**
(China) L-L Chen	1	0
Q	(United States) C Morariu	4	3
LL	(Germany) **C Porwik**	**6**	**6**
(Australia) A Ellwood	5	2
(Venezuela) **M Vento**	**7**	**6**
Q	(United States) J Lee	4	6
3	(Indonesia) **Y Basuki**	**6**	**7**
7	(Belgium) **L Courtois**	**6**	4	**6**
Q	(United States) K Po	2	**6**	4
(Belgium) **N Feber**	**6**	**6**
WC	(Indonesia) A Limanto	0	1
WC	(Indonesia) E Sulistyowati	5	3
(United States) **E deLone**	**7**	**6**
(Japan) **K Nagatsuka**	**6**	**6**
2	(Chinese Taipei) S-T Wang	1	4

Second round
1	(Belgium) **S Appelmans**	2	**6**	**6**
(Canada) J Nejedly	**6**	4	4
(Japan) **N Kijimuta**	**6**	**7**
8	(United States) A Grossman	4	5
4	(United States) M Werdel-Witmeyer	4	3
(Japan) **R Hiraki**	**6**	**6**
(Slovakia) K Studeníková	6	**6**	1
5	(United States) **L Wild**	**7**	3	**6**
6	(Germany) K Kschwendt	2	4
LL	(Germany) **C Porwik**	**6**	**6**
(Venezuela) M Vento	3	0
3	(Indonesia) **Y Basuki**	**6**	**6**
7	(Belgium) **L Courtois**	3	**6**	**6**
(Belgium) N Feber	**6**	1	1
(United States) E deLone	3	**6**	3
(Japan) **K Nagatsuka**	**6**	4	**6**

Quarterfinals
1	(Belgium) S Appelmans	**6**	2	6
(Japan) **N Kijimuta**	3	**6**	**7**
(Japan) R Hiraki	5	3
5	(United States) **L Wild**	**7**	**6**
LL	(Germany) C Porwik	0	r
3	(Indonesia) **Y Basuki**	**4**
7	(Belgium) **L Courtois**	**6**	**6**
(Japan) K Nagatsuka	4	3

Semifinals
(Japan) N Kijimuta	**7**	3	4
5	(United States) **L Wild**	5	**6**	**6**
3	(Indonesia) **Y Basuki**	**7**	5	**7**
7	(Belgium) L Courtois	6	**7**	5

Final
5	(United States) **Linda Wild**	**w/o**
3	(Indonesia) Yayuk Basuki
