= 1998 Japan Open Tennis Championships – Men's doubles =

Men's doubles
- 1998 Japan Open Tennis Championships

Final
- Champions: (Canada) Sébastien Lareau (Canada) Daniel Nestor
- Runners-up: (France) Olivier Delaître (Italy) Stefano Pescosolido
- Score: 6–3, 6–4

Details
- Draw: 28 (2Q / 5WC)
- Seeds: 8

Events
Singles	men	women
Doubles	men	women
- Japan Open

The 1998 Japan Open Tennis Championships was a tennis tournament played on outdoor hard courts at the Ariake Coliseum in Tokyo in Japan that was part of the International Series Gold of the 1998 ATP Tour and of Tier III of the 1998 WTA Tour. The tournament was held from April 13 through April 19, 1998.

== Seeds ==
Champion seeds are indicated in bold text while text in italics indicates the round in which those seeds were eliminated.

1. Unknown (withdrew)
2. (United States) Alex O'Brien / (United States) Jonathan Stark (semifinals)
3. (Canada) **Sébastien Lareau** / (Canada) **Daniel Nestor (champions)**
4. (Zimbabwe) Byron Black / (Australia) Patrick Rafter (quarterfinals)
5. (United States) Brian MacPhie / (Australia) Sandon Stolle (quarterfinals)
6. (Australia) Michael Tebbutt / (Sweden) Mikael Tillström (first round)
7. (Sweden) Peter Nyborg / (Germany) David Prinosil (semifinals)
8. (United States) Kent Kinnear / (United Kingdom) Chris Wilkinson (first round)

== Draw ==
Key

- Q = Qualifier
- WC = Wild card
- LL = Lucky loser
- Alt = Alternate
- ITF = ITF entry
- PR = Protected ranking
- SR = Special ranking
- SE = Special exempt
- JE = Junior exempt
- JR = Junior Accelerator Programme entrant
- CO = College Accelerator Programme entrant
- NG = Next Gen Accelerator Program entrant
- w/o = Walkover
- r = Retired
- d = Defaulted

=== Finals ===
Semifinals
7	(Sweden) Peter Nyborg (Germany) David Prinosil	3	**7**	1
3	(Canada) **Sébastien Lareau** **(Canada) Daniel Nestor**	**6**	6	**6**
(France) **Olivier Delaître** **(Italy) Stefano Pescosolido**	**6**	**7**
2	(United States) Alex O'Brien (United States) Jonathan Stark	4	5

Final
3	(Canada) **Sébastien Lareau** **(Canada) Daniel Nestor**	**6**	**6**
(France) Olivier Delaître (Italy) Stefano Pescosolido	3	4

=== Top half ===
First round
(Australia) **J Holmes** **(Mexico) B Martínez**	**6**	**6**
WC	(Japan) H Ishii (United Kingdom) D Sapsford	4	3
(Japan) **S Iwabuchi** **(Japan) M Takada**	**7**	**6**
(Australia) B Ellwood (Japan) G Motomura	6	2
7	(Sweden) **P Nyborg** **(Germany) D Prinosil**	**6**	**7**
(South Africa) C Haggard (South Africa) P Rosner	3	5
(Romania) **A Pavel** **(Sweden) L-A Wahlgren**	6	**6**	**6**
WC	(Italy) G Pozzi (Japan) T Suzuki	**7**	3	2
(United States) **D DiLucia** **(United States) M Sell**	**6**	**6**
Q	(United States) S Campbell (United States) M Joyce	1	2
5	(United States) **B MacPhie** **(Australia) S Stolle**	**7**	**7**
(Spain) Ó Burrieza (Czech Republic) R Vašek	5	5

Second round
(Australia) J Holmes (Mexico) B Martínez	**7**	2	2
(Czech Republic) **M Damm** **(Czech Republic) D Vacek**	6	**6**	**6**
(Japan) S Iwabuchi (Japan) M Takada	4	4
7	(Sweden) **P Nyborg** **(Germany) D Prinosil**	**6**	**6**
(Romania) A Pavel (Sweden) L-A Wahlgren	2^{r}
3	(Canada) **S Lareau** **(Canada) D Nestor**	4
(United States) D DiLucia (United States) M Sell	**6**	6	5
5	(United States) **B MacPhie** **(Australia) S Stolle**	3	**7**	**7**

Quarterfinals
(Czech Republic) M Damm (Czech Republic) D Vacek	4	5
7	(Sweden) **P Nyborg** **(Germany) D Prinosil**	**6**	**7**
3	(Canada) **S Lareau** **(Canada) D Nestor**	**6**	**6**
5	(United States) B MacPhie (Australia) S Stolle	4	0

Semifinals
7	(Sweden) P Nyborg (Germany) D Prinosil	3	**7**	1
3	(Canada) **S Lareau** **(Canada) D Nestor**	**6**	6	**6**

=== Bottom half ===
First round
(France) **O Delaître** **(Italy) S Pescosolido**	6	**6**	**7**
6	(Australia) M Tebbutt (Sweden) M Tillström	**7**	3	6
(France) **A Clément** **(France) J Golmard**	**6**	**6**
WC	(Japan) Y Ishii (Japan) H Sato	4	3
(South Africa) **N Godwin** **(Finland) T Ketola**	5	**6**	**6**
(Sweden) F Bergh (Sweden) T Johansson	**7**	3	4
(Italy) **V Santopadre** **(United States) V Spadea**	**7**	**6**
8	(United States) K Kinnear (United Kingdom) C Wilkinson	6	2
Q	(Japan) **T Chaen** **(Japan) R Tsujino**	3	**6**	**6**
WC	(United States) M Keil (United States) T. J. Middleton	**6**	3	4
(United States) **S Davis** **(United Kingdom) A Richardson**	**7**	6	**7**
WC	(Japan) S Matsuoka (Japan) M Onoda	6	**7**	6

Second round
(France) **O Delaître** **(Italy) S Pescosolido**	3	**6**	**6**
(France) A Clément (France) J Golmard	**6**	3	4
(South Africa) N Godwin (Finland) T Ketola	6	4
4	(Zimbabwe) **B Black** **(Australia) P Rafter**	**7**	**6**
(Italy) **V Santopadre** **(United States) V Spadea**	**7**	**6**
Q	(Japan) T Chaen (Japan) R Tsujino	5	4
(United States) S Davis (United Kingdom) A Richardson	5	1
2	(United States) **A O'Brien** **(United States) J Stark**	**7**	**6**

Quarterfinals
(France) **O Delaître** **(Italy) S Pescosolido**	**6**	3	**6**
4	(Zimbabwe) B Black (Australia) P Rafter	4	**6**	4
(Italy) V Santopadre (United States) V Spadea	4	0
2	(United States) **A O'Brien** **(United States) J Stark**	**6**	**6**

Semifinals
(France) **O Delaître** **(Italy) S Pescosolido**	**6**	**7**
2	(United States) A O'Brien (United States) J Stark	4	5
