= 1997 Japan Open Tennis Championships =

- Date: 14–21 April
- Edition: 24th
- Surface: Hard / outdoor
- Location: Tokyo, Japan
- Venue: Ariake Coliseum

Champions

Men's singles
- (Netherlands) Richard Krajicek

Women's singles
- (Japan) Ai Sugiyama

Men's doubles
- (Czech Republic) Martin Damm / (Czech Republic) Daniel Vacek

Women's doubles
- (France) Alexia Dechaume-Balleret / (Japan) Rika Hiraki
- Japan Open

The 1997 Japan Open Tennis Championships was a tennis tournament played on outdoor hard courts at the Ariake Coliseum in Tokyo in Japan that was part of the Championship Series of the 1997 ATP Tour and of Tier III of the 1997 WTA Tour. The tournament was held from April 14 through April 21, 1997. Richard Krajicek and Ai Sugiyama won the singles titles.

== Finals ==
=== Men's singles ===
(Netherlands) Richard Krajicek defeated (France) Lionel Roux 6–2, 3–6, 6–1

- It was Krajicek's 2nd title of the year and the 15th of his career.

=== Women's singles ===
(Japan) Ai Sugiyama defeated (United States) Amy Frazier 4–6, 6–4, 6–4

- It was Sugiyama's 1st title of the year and the 4th of her career.

=== Men's doubles ===
(Czech Republic) Martin Damm / (Czech Republic) Daniel Vacek defeated (United States) Justin Gimelstob / (Australia) Patrick Rafter 2–6, 6–2, 7–6

- It was Damm's 2nd title of the year and the 10th of his career. It was Vacek's 2nd title of the year and the 16th of his career.

=== Women's doubles ===
(France) Alexia Dechaume-Balleret / (Japan) Rika Hiraki defeated (Australia) Kerry-Anne Guse / (United States) Corina Morariu 6–4, 6–2

- It was Dechaume-Balleret's only title of the year and the 6th of her career. It was Hiraki's 2nd title of the year and the 5th of her career.
