= 2006 Hansol Korea Open =

- Date: 25 September – 1 October
- Edition: 3rd
- Category: WTA Tier IV
- Draw: 32S / 16D
- Prize money: $145,000
- Surface: Hard
- Location: Seoul, South Korea
- Venue: Seoul Olympic Park Tennis Center

Champions

Singles
- (Greece) Eleni Daniilidou

Doubles
- (Spain) Virginia Ruano Pascual / (Argentina) Paola Suárez
- Korea Open

The 2006 Hansol Korea Open Tennis Championships was a women's professional tennis tournament played on hard courts. It was the 3rd edition of the tournament, and part of the 2006 WTA Tour. It took place in Seoul, South Korea between 25 September and 1 October 2006. Unseeded Eleni Daniilidou won the singles title.

== Finals ==
=== Singles ===
(Greece) Eleni Daniilidou defeated (Japan) Ai Sugiyama, 6–3, 2–6, 7–6^{(7–3)}

- It was Daniilidou's first title of the year and her fourth overall

=== Doubles ===
(Spain) Virginia Ruano Pascual / (Argentina) Paola Suárez defeated (Chinese Taipei) Chuang Chia-jung / (Argentina) Mariana Díaz Oliva, 6–2, 6–3

- It was Ruano Pascual's 3rd title of the year and the 37th of her career; it was Suárez's 3rd title of the year and the 42nd of her career

== Singles main-draw entrants ==
=== Seeds ===
Country	Player	Rank^{1}	Seed
SUI	Martina Hingis	9	1
RUS	Maria Kirilenko	25	2
FRA	Marion Bartoli	26	3
JPN	Ai Sugiyama	28	4
RUS	Vera Zvonareva	29	5
SWE	Sofia Arvidsson	35	6
ARG	Gisela Dulko	39	7
CZE	Lucie Šafářová	40	8

- ^{1} Rankings are as of September 18, 2006

=== Other entrants ===
The following players received wildcards into the singles main draw:

- (South Korea) Kim So-jung
- (South Korea) Lee Ye-ra
- (Indonesia) Angelique Widjaja

The following players received entry from the qualifying draw:

- (South Africa) Natalie Grandin
- (Romania) Raluca Olaru
- (Russia) Anastasia Rodionova
- (Denmark) Caroline Wozniacki

=== Withdrawals ===
Before the tournament

- (United States) Ansley Cargill
- (Czech Republic) Iveta Benešová
- (United States) Shenay Perry

== Doubles main-draw entrants ==
=== Seeds ===
Country	Player	Country	Player	Rank^{1}	Seed
ESP	Virginia Ruano Pascual	ARG	Paola Suárez	26	1
RUS	Vera Dushevina	RUS	Vera Zvonareva	65	2
ARG	Gisela Dulko	FIN	Emma Laine	107	3
FRA	Séverine Brémond	GRE	Eleni Daniilidou	151	4

- ^{1} Rankings are as of September 18, 2006
