= 1999 Japan Open Tennis Championships – Men's singles =

Men's singles
- 1999 Japan Open Tennis Championships

Final
- Champion: (Germany) Nicolas Kiefer
- Runner-up: (South Africa) Wayne Ferreira
- Score: 7–6^{(7–5)}, 7–5

Details
- Draw: 56 (7 Q )
- Seeds: 16

Events
Singles	men	women
Doubles	men	women
- Japan Open

The 1999 Japan Open Tennis Championships was a tennis tournament played on outdoor hard courts at the Ariake Coliseum in Tokyo, Japan that was part of the International Series Gold of the 1999 ATP Tour. The tournament was held from April 12 through April 18, 1999.

== Seeds ==
Champion seeds are indicated in bold text while text in italics indicates the round in which those seeds were eliminated.

1. (Netherlands) Richard Krajicek (quarterfinals)
2. (United States) Andre Agassi (withdrew)
3. (Sweden) Thomas Enqvist (quarterfinals)
4. (Sweden) Wayne Ferreira (semifinals)
5. (Germany) **Nicolas Kiefer (champion)**
6. (Zimbabwe) Byron Black (second round)
7. (South Africa) Wayne Ferreira (final)
8. (Sweden) Jonas Björkman (semifinals)
9. (United States) Michael Chang (second round)
10. (Czech Republic) Daniel Vacek (second round)
11. (Australia) Mark Woodforde (first round)
12. (Netherlands) Sjeng Schalken (third round)
13. (Slovakia) Ján Krošlák (first round)
14. (Italy) Gianluca Pozzi (third round)
15. (Germany) Rainer Schüttler (first round)
16. (Germany) David Prinosil (third round)

== Draw ==
Key

- Q = Qualifier
- WC = Wild card
- LL = Lucky loser
- Alt = Alternate
- ITF = ITF entry
- PR = Protected ranking
- SR = Special ranking
- SE = Special exempt
- JE = Junior exempt
- JR = Junior Accelerator Programme entrant
- CO = College Accelerator Programme entrant
- NG = Next Gen Accelerator Program entrant
- w/o = Walkover
- r = Retired
- d = Defaulted

=== Finals ===
Semifinals
8	(Sweden) Jonas Björkman	**6**	1	4
5	**(Germany) Nicolas Kiefer**	4	**6**	**6**
4	(Sweden) Thomas Johansson	3	2
7	**(South Africa) Wayne Ferreira**	**6**	**6**

Final
5	**(Germany) Nicolas Kiefer**	**7**	**7**
7	(South Africa) Wayne Ferreira	6	5

=== Top half ===
==== Section 1 ====
First round
**(Netherlands) J van Lottum**	**6**	**6**
(France) N Escudé	2	4
**(Philippines) C Mamiit**	**7**	**6**
(United States) B MacPhie	6	2
16	**(Germany) D Prinosil**	**6**	**6**
(Czech Republic) M Damm	1	3
9	**(United States) M Chang**	**7**	6	**7**
(Australia) M Hill	6	**7**	6
**(Germany) J Knippschild**	**6**	**7**
(New Zealand) B Steven	2	5
**(Italy) L Tieleman**	**6**	**7**
(Germany) M Kohlmann	3	6

Second round
1	**(Netherlands) R Krajicek**	**3**	1
(Netherlands) J van Lottum	1	0^{r}
(Philippines) C Mamiit	2	3
16	**(Germany) D Prinosil**	**6**	**6**
9	(United States) M Chang	3	4
**(Germany) J Knippschild**	**6**	**6**
(Italy) L Tieleman	3	3
8	**(Sweden) J Björkman**	**6**	**6**

Third round
1	**(Netherlands) R Krajicek**	**6**	**6**
16	(Germany) D Prinosil	4	4
(Germany) J Knippschild	**7**	4	4
8	**(Sweden) J Björkman**	6	**6**	**6**

Quarterfinals
1	(Netherlands) R Krajicek	**6**	5	1
8	**(Sweden) J Björkman**	3	**7**	**6**

==== Section 2 ====
First round
**(Czech Republic) R Štěpánek**	**7**	**6**
(United States) J Tarango	5	4
**(Canada) D Nestor**	4	**6**	**6**
(Germany) C Vinck	**6**	3	3
**(Sweden) M Tillström**	**7**	**6**
13	(Slovakia) J Krošlák	6	4
**(United States) M Sell**	**7**	2	**6**
11	(Australia) M Woodforde	6	**6**	3
**(Japan) G Motomura**	**6**	**6**
(Japan) S Iwabuchi	2	4
**(Thailand) P Srichaphan**	**6**	**7**
(Italy) V Santopadre	3	6

Second round
3	**(Sweden) T Enqvist**	**7**	**6**
(Czech Republic) R Štěpánek	6	4
**(Canada) D Nestor**	**6**	**6**
(Sweden) M Tillström	2	2
**(United States) M Sell**	6	**6**	**6**
(Japan) G Motomura	**7**	;4	3
(Thailand) P Srichaphan	2	3
5	**(Germany) N Kiefer**	**6**	**6**

Third round
3	**(Sweden) T Enqvist**	**6**	**6**
(Canada) D Nestor	2	2
(United States) M Sell	**6**	3	2
5	**(Germany) N Kiefer**	3	**6**	**6**

Quarterfinals
3	(Sweden) T Enqvist	**7**	5	4
5	**(Germany) N Kiefer**	6	**7**	**6**

=== Bottom half ===
==== Section 3 ====
First round
**(Canada) S Lareau**	6	**6**	**6**
(Japan) T Suzuki	**7**	3	2
**(Germany) O Gross**	**6**	**6**
(Japan) Y Yamamoto	4	4
12	**(Netherlands) S Schalken**	**6**	**6**
(Zimbabwe) W Black	4	1
14	**(Italy) G Pozzi**	**6**	**6**
(Netherlands) R Wassen	2	3
**(United States) P Goldstein**	**7**	**6**
(Germany) H Dreekmann	5	4
**(Japan) H Kaneko**	**6**	**6**
(The Bahamas) M Knowles	3	4

Second round
6	(Zimbabwe) B Black	3	5
**(Canada) S Lareau**	**6**	**7**
(Germany) O Gross	4	2
12	**(Netherlands) S Schalken**	**6**	**6**
14	**(Italy) G Pozzi**	**6**	4	**6**
(United States) P Goldstein	4	**6**	4
(Japan) H Kaneko	3	3
4	**(Sweden) T Johansson**	**6**	**6**

Third round
**(Canada) S Lareau**	2	**7**	**7**
12	(Netherlands) S Schalken	**6**	6	6
14	(Italy) G Pozzi	4	**6**	4
4	**(Sweden) T Johansson**	**6**	3	**6**

Quarterfinals
(Canada) S Lareau	1	4
4	**(Sweden) T Johansson**	**6**	**6**

==== Section 4 ====
First round
**(Netherlands) D van Scheppingen**	**6**	**6**
(Bulgaria) O Stanoytchev	2	1
**(Germany) L Burgsmüller**	**6**	3	**6**
(Netherlands) P Wessels	3	**6**	2
10	**(Czech Republic) D Vacek**	**6**	**6**
(United States) G Grant	1	1
**(Denmark) K Carlsen**	**6**	**6**
15	(Germany) R Schüttler	2	4
**(Australia) W Arthurs**	**6**	**6**
(Argentina) M Rodríguez	4	3
**(Germany) B Karbacher**	**6**	**7**
(United States) S Campbell	2	6

Second round
7	**(South Africa) W Ferreira**	**7**	**6**
(Netherlands) D van Scheppingen	6	3
**(Germany) L Burgsmüller**	**6**	**7**
10	(Czech Republic) D Vacek	2	5
**(Denmark) K Carlsen**	**6**	**6**
(Australia) W Arthurs	4	2
**(Germany) B Karbacher**	**7**	**6**
(United States) D DiLucia	6	2

Third round
7	**(South Africa) W Ferreira**	**6**	**6**
(Germany) L Burgsmüller	3	4
**(Denmark) K Carlsen**	**7**	**6**
(Germany) B Karbacher	5	2

Quarterfinals
7	**(South Africa) W Ferreira**	3	**6**	**6**
(Denmark) K Carlsen	**6**	2	3
