= 1999 Japan Open Tennis Championships =

- Date: 12–18 April
- Edition: 26th
- Category: Championship Series; Tier III
- Surface: Hard / outdoor
- Location: Tokyo, Japan
- Venue: Ariake Coliseum

Champions

Men's singles
- (Germany) Nicolas Kiefer

Women's singles
- (United States) Amy Frazier

Men's doubles
- (United States) Jeff Tarango / (Czech Republic) Daniel Vacek

Women's doubles
- (United States) Corina Morariu / (United States) Kimberly Po
- Japan Open

The 1999 Japan Open Tennis Championships was a tennis tournament played on outdoor hard courts at the Ariake Coliseum in Tokyo, Japan that was part of the International Series Gold of the 1999 ATP Tour and of Tier III of the 1999 WTA Tour. The tournament was held from April 12 through April 18, 1999. Fifth-seeded Nicolas Kiefer and second-seeded Amy Frazier won the singles titles.

== Finals ==
=== Men's singles ===
(Germany) Nicolas Kiefer defeated (South Africa) Wayne Ferreira, 7–6^{(7–5)}, 7–5

- It was Kiefer's 1st title of the year and the 3rd of his career.

=== Women's singles ===
(United States) Amy Frazier defeated (Japan) Ai Sugiyama, 6–2, 6–2

- It was Frazier's 1st title of the year and the 9th of her career.

=== Men's doubles ===
(United States) Jeff Tarango / (Czech Republic) Daniel Vacek defeated (Zimbabwe) Wayne Black / (United States) Brian MacPhie, 4–3, retired

=== Women's doubles ===
(United States) Corina Morariu / (United States) Kimberly Po defeated (Australia) Catherine Barclay / (Australia) Kerry-Anne Guse, 6–3, 6–2

== Entrants ==
=== Seeds ===
Country	Player	Rank	Seed
JPN	Ai Sugiyama	27	1
USA	Amy Frazier	35	2
USA	Corina Morariu	36	3
USA	Kimberly Po	58	4
PUR	Kristina Brandi	65	5
USA	Meghann Shaughnessy	68	6
USA	Jane Chi	75	7
TPE	Wang Shi-ting	77	8

=== Other entrants ===
The following players received wildcards into the singles main draw:

- (Japan) Saori Obata
- (Japan) Shinobu Asagoe

The following players received wildcards into the doubles main draw:

- (Japan) Haruka Inoue / (Japan) Maiko Inoue

The following players received entry from the singles qualifying draw:

- (United States) Katie Schlukebir
- (Japan) Misumi Miyauchi
- (South Korea) Cho Yoon-jeong
- (United Kingdom) Hannah Collin

The following players received entry as lucky losers:

- (Indonesia) Wynne Prakusya
