= 1997 Japan Open Tennis Championships – Men's singles =

Men's singles
- 1997 Japan Open Tennis Championships

Final
- Champion: (Netherlands) Richard Krajicek
- Runner-up: (France) Lionel Roux
- Score: 6–2, 3–6, 6–1

Details
- Draw: 56 (7 Q / 5 WC )
- Seeds: 16

Events
Singles	men	women
Doubles	men	women
- Japan Open

Pete Sampras was the defending champion, but did not participate.

Richard Krajicek won the title, defeating Lionel Roux 6–2, 3–6, 6–1 in the final.

== Seeds ==
The top eight seeds received a bye into the second round.

1. (Netherlands) Richard Krajicek (champion)
2. (Germany) Boris Becker (third round)
3. (Switzerland) Marc Rosset (third round)
4. (Australia) Todd Woodbridge (quarterfinals)
5. (Sweden) Thomas Johansson (semifinals)
6. (Australia) Patrick Rafter (semifinals)
7. (Czech Republic) Martin Damm (quarterfinals)
8. (Germany) David Prinosil (quarterfinals)
9. (Czech Republic) Daniel Vacek (first round)
10. (United States) Jonathan Stark (third round)
11. (Germany) Alex Rădulescu (first round)
12. (Sweden) Mikael Tillström (second round)
13. (Australia) Mark Woodforde (quarterfinals)
14. (United States) Jeff Tarango (third round)
15. (Sweden) Magnus Norman (third round)
16. (France) Lionel Roux (final)

== Draw ==
Key

- Q = Qualifier
- WC = Wild card
- LL = Lucky loser
- Alt = Alternate
- ITF = ITF entry
- PR = Protected ranking
- SR = Special ranking
- SE = Special exempt
- JE = Junior exempt
- JR = Junior Accelerator Programme entrant
- CO = College Accelerator Programme entrant
- NG = Next Gen Accelerator Program entrant
- w/o = Walkover
- r = Retired
- d = Defaulted

=== Finals ===
Quarterfinals
1	(Netherlands) Richard Krajicek	6	6
8	(Germany) David Prinosil	4	3
4	(Australia) Todd Woodbridge	4	6^{3}
6	(Australia) Patrick Rafter	6	7^{7}
5	(Sweden) Thomas Johansson	6	6
13	(Australia) Mark Woodforde	3	4
7	(Czech Republic) Martin Damm	3	1
16	(France) Lionel Roux	6	6

Semifinals
1	(Netherlands) Richard Krajicek	7^{7}	6
6	(Australia) Patrick Rafter	6^{5}	3
5	(Sweden) Thomas Johansson	6	5	3
16	(France) Lionel Roux	4	7	6

Final
1	(Netherlands) Richard Krajicek	6	3	6
16	(France) Lionel Roux	2	6	1

=== Top half ===
==== Section 1 ====
First round
(Romania) A Pavel	4	4
(South Africa) N Godwin	6	6
(Netherlands) F Wibier	4	6^{4}
(United States) J Gimelstob	6	7^{7}
(India) L Paes	6^{4}	1
15	(Sweden) M Norman	7^{7}	6
10	(United States) J Stark	6	3	6
(Bulgaria) O Stanoytchev	3	6	1
(Denmark) F Fetterlein	3	6	6
(Japan) G Motomura	6	4	3
(United States) D Flach	2	4
(France) J Golmard	6	6

Second round
1	(Netherlands) R Krajicek	6	6
(South Africa) N Godwin	3	4
(United States) J Gimelstob	4	2
15	(Sweden) M Norman	6	6
10	(United States) J Stark	4	6	7
(Denmark) F Fetterlein	6	3	5
(France) J Golmard	5	1
8	(Germany) D Prinosil	7	6

Third round
1	(Netherlands) R Krajicek	7	6
15	(Sweden) M Norman	5	0
10	(United States) J Stark	7^{7}	6^{6}	5
8	(Germany) D Prinosil	6^{4}	7^{8}	7

Quarterfinals
1	(Netherlands) R Krajicek	6	6
8	(Germany) D Prinosil	4	3

==== Section 2 ====
First round
WC	(Japan) T Shimada	2	2
(Romania) R Sabău	6	6
WC	(Japan) T Suzuki	6	6
(Germany) A Thoms	4	2
Q	(Netherlands) J Winnink	3	2
14	(United States) J Tarango	6	6
12	(Sweden) M Tillström	7^{7}	7
(Zimbabwe) K Ullyett	6^{3}	5
(Sweden) H Holm	4	6	7
(United States) M Joyce	6	3	5
(Sweden) L Jönsson	3	2
(Israel) E Ran	6	6

Second round
4	(Australia) T Woodbridge	6	6
(Romania) R Sabău	3	4
WC	(Japan) T Suzuki	3	2
14	(United States) J Tarango	6	6
12	(Sweden) M Tillström	4	6	4
(Sweden) H Holm	6	3	6
(Israel) E Ran	0	4
6	(Australia) P Rafter	6	6

Third round
4	(Australia) T Woodbridge	7	6
14	(United States) J Tarango	5	2
(Sweden) H Holm	1	2
6	(Australia) P Rafter	6	6

Quarterfinals
4	(Australia) T Woodbridge	4	6^{3}
6	(Australia) P Rafter	6	7^{7}

=== Bottom half ===
==== Section 3 ====
First round
(Czech Republic) D Škoch	1	7^{7}	3
(Canada) D Nestor	6	6^{2}	6
WC	(Japan) H Kaneko	6	6
(Egypt) T El-Sawy	1	1
(Japan) S Matsuoka	7^{7}	6^{3}	6
11	(Germany) A Rădulescu	6^{0}	7^{7}	4
13	(Australia) M Woodforde	6	6
WC	(Japan) S Iwabuchi	1	3
(Germany) M Sinner	6	6
(Russia) A Olhovskiy	3	4
(Sweden) T Nydahl	6	2	4
Q	(United Kingdom) A Richardson	3	6	6

Second round
5	(Sweden) T Johansson	6	6
(Canada) D Nestor	4	4
WC	(Japan) H Kaneko	3	4
(Japan) S Matsuoka	6	6
13	(Australia) M Woodforde	6	6
(Germany) M Sinner	1	4
Q	(United Kingdom) A Richardson	6^{6}	6	2
3	(Switzerland) M Rosset	7^{8}	2	6

Third round
5	(Sweden) T Johansson	6	6
(Japan) S Matsuoka	2	2
13	(Australia) M Woodforde	6	6
3	(Switzerland) M Rosset	2	3

Quarterfinals
5	(Sweden) T Johansson	6	6
13	(Australia) M Woodforde	3	4

==== Section 4 ====
First round
Q	(The Bahamas) R Smith	7^{7}	3	3
Q	(France) O Delaître	6^{5}	6	6
WC	(Japan) Y Yamamoto	2	5
Q	(Germany) C Arriens	6	7
(Russia) A Cherkasov	6	7^{7}
9	(Czech Republic) D Vacek	3	6^{3}
16	(France) L Roux	6	6
Q	(South Africa) D Adams	1	4
Q	(United States) J Grabb	3	2
(France) J-P Fleurian	6	6
(Canada) S Lareau	6	6
(France) S Simian	3	2

Second round
7	(Czech Republic) M Damm	7	4	6
Q	(France) O Delaître	5	6	4
Q	(Germany) C Arriens	1	6	5
(Russia) A Cherkasov	6	4	7
16	(France) L Roux	7^{7}	6
(France) J-P Fleurian	6^{3}	4
(Canada) S Lareau	2	6	2
2	(Germany) B Becker	6	4	6

Third round
7	(Czech Republic) M Damm	7^{7}	7
(Russia) A Cherkasov	6^{2}	5
16	(France) L Roux	4	6	6
2	(Germany) B Becker	6	3	1

Quarterfinals
7	(Czech Republic) M Damm	3	1
16	(France) L Roux	6	6
