= Sabine Haas =

German tennis player

- Country (sports): Germany
- Born: 24 April 1975 (age 50)
- Prize money: $31,419

Singles
- Career titles: 1 ITF
- Highest ranking: No. 315 (7 October 1996)

Doubles
- Career titles: 1 ITF
- Highest ranking: No. 209 (7 July 1997)

Sabine Haas (born 24 April 1975) is a German former professional tennis player.

Haas, a German Youth Champion at age 13, trained as a junior with Nick Bollettieri in Florida, as did her younger brother, future world number two Tommy Haas.

On the professional tour, Haas reached a best singles ranking of 315 and won an ITF title in San Antonio in 1995. She featured in four WTA Tour main draws as a doubles player, which included a quarter-final appearance at the Jakarta held 1997 Danamon Open, before retiring from the tour in 1998.

== ITF finals ==
$25,000 tournaments
$10,000 tournaments

=== Singles: 3 (1–2) ===
Outcome	No.	Date	Tournament	Surface	Opponent	Score
Runner-up	1.	28 September 1992	Mali Lošinj, Yugoslavia	Clay	(Czechoslovakia) Ivana Havrlíková	3–6, 2–6
Winner	1.	22 January 1995	San Antonio, United States	Hard	(United States) Lindsay Lee-Waters	7–6^{(8–6)}, 6–0
Runner-up	2.	27 November 1995	São Paulo, Brazil	Hard	(Germany) Angelika Rösch	1–6, 7–5, 2–6

=== Doubles: 5 (1–4) ===
Outcome	No.	Date	Tournament	Surface	Partner	Opponents	Score
Runner-up	1.	16 May 1993	Basingstoke, United Kingdom	Hard	(South Africa) Liezel Horn	(United Kingdom) Valda Lake (Australia) Robyn Mawdsley	6–3, 4–6, 1–6
Winner	1.	20 June 1994	Zagreb, Croatia	Clay	(Croatia) Ivona Horvat	(Croatia) Ivana Ivanek (Austria) Sabine Resch	6–2, 6–3
Runner-up	2.	19 June 1995	Cureglia, Switzerland	Clay	(Denmark) Sandra Olsen	(Netherlands) Henriëtte van Aalderen (Netherlands) Stephanie Gomperts	5–7, 3–6
Runner-up	3.	14 July 1996	Puchheim, Germany	Clay	(Czech Republic) Pavlína Rajzlová	(Czech Republic) Eva Martincová (Czech Republic) Alena Vašková	2–6, 7–5, 1–6
Runner-up	4.	17 March 1997	Woodlands, United States	Hard	(Sweden) Kristina Triska	(Belgium) Nancy Feber (South Africa) Liezel Horn	1–6, 2–6
