= 2006 Hansol Korea Open – Singles =

Singles
- 2006 Hansol Korea Open

Final
- Champion: (Greece) Eleni Daniilidou
- Runner-up: (Japan) Ai Sugiyama
- Score: 6–3, 2–6, 7–6^{(7–3)}

Details
- Draw: 32
- Seeds: 8

Events
| Singles | Doubles |
- Korea Open

Nicole Vaidišová was the defending champion from 2005, but decided not to compete in 2006.

Eleni Daniilidou won the title, defeating Ai Sugiyama in the final, 6–3, 2–6, 7–6^{(7–3)}.

== Seeds ==
1. (Switzerland) Martina Hingis (second round)
2. (Russia) Maria Kirilenko (first round)
3. (France) Marion Bartoli (semifinals)
4. (Japan) Ai Sugiyama (finals)
5. (Russia) Vera Zvonareva (quarterfinals)
6. (Sweden) Sofia Arvidsson (first round)
7. (Argentina) Gisela Dulko (second round)
8. (Czech Republic) Lucie Šafářová (first round)

== Draw ==
Key

- Q = Qualifier
- WC = Wild card
- LL = Lucky loser
- Alt = Alternate
- ITF = ITF entry
- PR = Protected ranking
- SR = Special ranking
- SE = Special exempt
- JE = Junior exempt
- JR = Junior Accelerator Programme entrant
- CO = College Accelerator Programme entrant
- NG = Next Gen Accelerator Program entrant
- w/o = Walkover
- r = Retired
- d = Defaulted

=== Finals ===
Semifinals
(Spain) Virginia Ruano Pascual | 0 | 3
4 | (Japan) Ai Sugiyama | 6 | 6
3 | (France) Marion Bartoli | 1 | 0
(Greece) Eleni Daniilidou | 6 | 6

Final
4 | (Japan) Ai Sugiyama | 3 | 6 | 6^{3}
(Greece) Eleni Daniilidou | 6 | 2 | 7^{7}

=== Top half ===
First round
1 | (Switzerland) M Hingis | 6 | 6
Q | (Denmark) C Wozniacki | 3 | 2
(India) S Mirza | 3 | 6 | 6
WC | (South Korea) Y-r Lee | 6 | 0 | 0
Q | (South Africa) N Grandin | 6 | 3 | 6^{5}
WC | (Indonesia) A Widjaja | 4 | 6 | 7^{7}
(Spain) V Ruano Pascual | 7 | 6
8 | (Czech Republic) L Šafářová | 5 | 4
4 | (Japan) A Sugiyama | 1 | 6 | 6
Q | (Romania) IR Olaru | 6 | 2 | 4
(Poland) M Domachowska | 4 | 3
Q | (Russia) A Rodionova | 6 | 6
(Colombia) C Castaño | 6 | 6
(Croatia) S Ančić | 3 | 2
(Argentina) P Suárez | 6 | 6
7 | (Argentina) G Dulko | 1 | 3

Second round
1 | (Switzerland) M Hingis | 6 | 0 | 4
(India) S Mirza | 4 | 6 | 6
WC | (Indonesia) A Widjaja | 4 | 3
(Spain) V Ruano Pascual | 6 | 6
4 | (Japan) A Sugiyama | 6 | 6
Q | (Russia) A Rodionova | 3 | 1
(Colombia) C Castaño | 4 | 3
(Argentina) P Suárez | 6 | 6

Quarterfinals
(India) S Mirza | 6^{3} | 6 | 6^{3}
(Spain) V Ruano Pascual | 7^{7} | 4 | 7^{7}
4 | (Japan) A Sugiyama | 6 | 6
(Argentina) P Suárez | 2 | 3

Semifinals
(Spain) V Ruano Pascual | 0 | 3
4 | (Japan) A Sugiyama | 6 | 6

=== Bottom half ===
First round
6 | (Sweden) S Arvidsson | 0 | 4
(Japan) A Morigami | 6 | 6
(Argentina) M Díaz Oliva | 6^{3} | 3
(Japan) A Nakamura | 7 | 6
(France) S Brémond | 6 | 6^{5} | 6
(United States) M Tu | 4 | 7 | 1
(United States) J Craybas | 4 | 1
3 | (France) M Bartoli | 6 | 6
5 | (Russia) V Zvonareva | 6 | 6
(France) C Pin | 1 | 2
WC | (South Korea) S-J Kim | 3 | 2
(Finland) E Laine | 6 | 6
(United States) J Jackson | 5 | 4
(Greece) E Daniilidou | 7 | 6
(Russia) V Dushevina | 6 | 5 | 7
2 | (Russia) M Kirilenko | 3 | 7 | 5

Second round
(Japan) A Morigami | 7 | 6
(Japan) A Nakamura | 5 | 2
(France) S Brémond | 6^{1} | 1
3 | (France) M Bartoli | 7 | 6
5 | (Russia) V Zvonareva | 6 | 6
(Finland) E Laine | 4 | 0
(Greece) E Daniilidou | 1 | 6 | 6
(Russia) V Dushevina | 6 | 1 | 0

Quarterfinals
(Japan) A Morigami | 3 | 6 | 2
3 | (France) M Bartoli | 6 | 1 | 6
5 | (Russia) V Zvonareva | 6^{3} | 4
(Greece) E Daniilidou | 7 | 6

Semifinals
3 | (France) M Bartoli | 1 | 0
(Greece) E Daniilidou | 6 | 6

== Qualifying ==
=== Seeds ===
1. (Russia) Anastasia Rodionova (qualified)
2. (United States) Lilia Osterloh (qualifying competition)
3. (France) Youlia Fedossova (qualifying competition)
4. (Chinese Taipei) Chuang Chia-jung (second round)
5. (South Africa) Natalie Grandin (qualified)
6. (Denmark) Caroline Wozniacki (qualified)
7. (Venezuela) María Vento-Kabchi (qualifying competition)
8. (Romania) Ioana Raluca Olaru (qualified)

=== Qualifiers ===
1. (Russia) Anastasia Rodionova
2. (South Africa) Natalie Grandin
3. (Romania) Ioana Raluca Olaru
4. (Denmark) Caroline Wozniacki

=== Qualifying draw ===
==== First qualifier ====
First round
(South Korea) Lee Jin-a | 6 | 6^{5} | 6
(South Korea) Shin Jung-yoon | 1 | 7^{7} | 4
WC | (South Korea) Kim Ju-eun | 4 | 3
(China) Lu Jingjing | 6 | 6
(South Korea) Chae Kyung-yee | 6^{5} | 2
7 | (Venezuela) María Vento-Kabchi | 7^{7} | 6

Second round
1 | (Russia) Anastasia Rodionova | 6 | 6
(South Korea) Lee Jin-a | 3 | 3
(China) Lu Jingjing | 2 | 2
7 | (Venezuela) María Vento-Kabchi | 6 | 6

Qualifying competition
1 | (Russia) Anastasia Rodionova | 6 | 5 | 6
7 | (Venezuela) María Vento-Kabchi | 1 | 7 | 2

==== Second qualifier ====
| First round | | | | Second round | | | | Qualifying competition |
| | | | | 2 | (United States) Lilia Osterloh | 6 | 6 |
| | (South Korea) Bae Hae-youm | 6 | 6 | | (South Korea) Bae Hae-youm | 0 | 1 |
| WC | (South Korea) Mun Ye-ji | 0 | 1 | | | | | 2 | (United States) Lilia Osterloh | 2 | 6 | 1 |
| WC | (South Korea) Kim Joohyoung | 6 | 7^{7} | | | | | 5 | (South Africa) Natalie Grandin | 6 | 3 | 6 |
| WC | (South Korea) Lee Ji-young | 1 | 6^{4} | WC | (South Korea) Kim Joohyoung | 0 | 1 |
| | | | | 5 | (South Africa) Natalie Grandin | 6 | 6 |

==== Third qualifier ====
First round
WC | (South Korea) Chang Kyung-mi | 7 | 6
(South Korea) Seo Soon-mi | 5 | 3
(South Korea) Lyoo-suh Hee-sun | 6 | 6
WC | (South Korea) Shin Hong-kyung | 1 | 0
WC | (South Korea) Hong Da-jung | 2 | 3
8 | (Romania) Ioana Raluca Olaru | 6 | 6

Second round
3 | (France) Youlia Fedossova | 6 | 6
WC | (South Korea) Chang Kyung-mi | 3 | 1
(South Korea) Lyoo-suh Hee-sun | 0 | 1
8 | (Romania) Ioana Raluca Olaru | 6 | 6

Qualifying competition
3 | (France) Youlia Fedossova | 6 | 6^{3} | 3
8 | (Romania) Ioana Raluca Olaru | 4 | 7^{7} | 6

==== Fourth qualifier ====
| First round | | | | | Second round | | | | Qualifying competition |
| | | | | | 4 | (Chinese Taipei) Chuang Chia-jung | 0 | 4 |
| WC | (South Korea) Han Sung-hee | 6 | 6 | | WC | (South Korea) Han Sung-hee | 6 | 6 |
| WC | (South Korea) Kim Ji-sook | 1 | 2 | | | | | | WC | (South Korea) Han Sung-hee | 3 | 1 |
| (South Korea) Yoo Mi | | 2 | 7 | 6 | | | | | 6 | (Denmark) Caroline Wozniacki | 6 | 6 |
| (United States) Jennifer Elie | | 6 | 5 | 2 | | (South Korea) Yoo Mi | 0 | 5 |
| | | | | | 6 | (Denmark) Caroline Wozniacki | 6 | 7 |
