= 1997 Danamon Open =

- Date: 22–27 April
- Edition: 5th
- Category: Tier IV
- Draw: 32S / 16D
- Prize money: $107,500
- Surface: Hard / outdoor
- Location: Jakarta, Indonesia
- Venue: Gelora Senayan Stadium

Champions

Singles
- (Japan) Naoko Sawamatsu

Doubles
- (Australia) Kerry-Anne Guse / (Australia) Kristine Radford
- Danamon Open

The 1997 Danamon Open was a women's tennis tournament played on outdoor hardcourts at the Gelora Senayan Stadium in Jakarta, Indonesia and was part of the Tier IV category of the 1997 WTA Tour. It was the fifth and last edition of the tournament and was held from 22 April through 27 April 1997. Second-seeded Naoko Sawamatsu won the singles title.

== Finals ==
=== Singles ===
(Japan) Naoko Sawamatsu defeated (Japan) Yuka Yoshida 6–3, 6–2

- It was Sawamatsu's only singles title of the year and the 4th and last of her career.

=== Doubles ===
(Australia) Kerry-Anne Guse / (Australia) Kristine Radford defeated (Czech Republic) Lenka Němečková / (Japan) Yuka Yoshida 6–4, 5–7, 7–5

- It was Guse's 1st title of the year and the 4th of her career. It was Radford's 1st title of the year and the 5th of her career.
