= Yuka Kaneko =

Japanese tennis player (born 1976)

Yuka Yoshida 吉田友佳
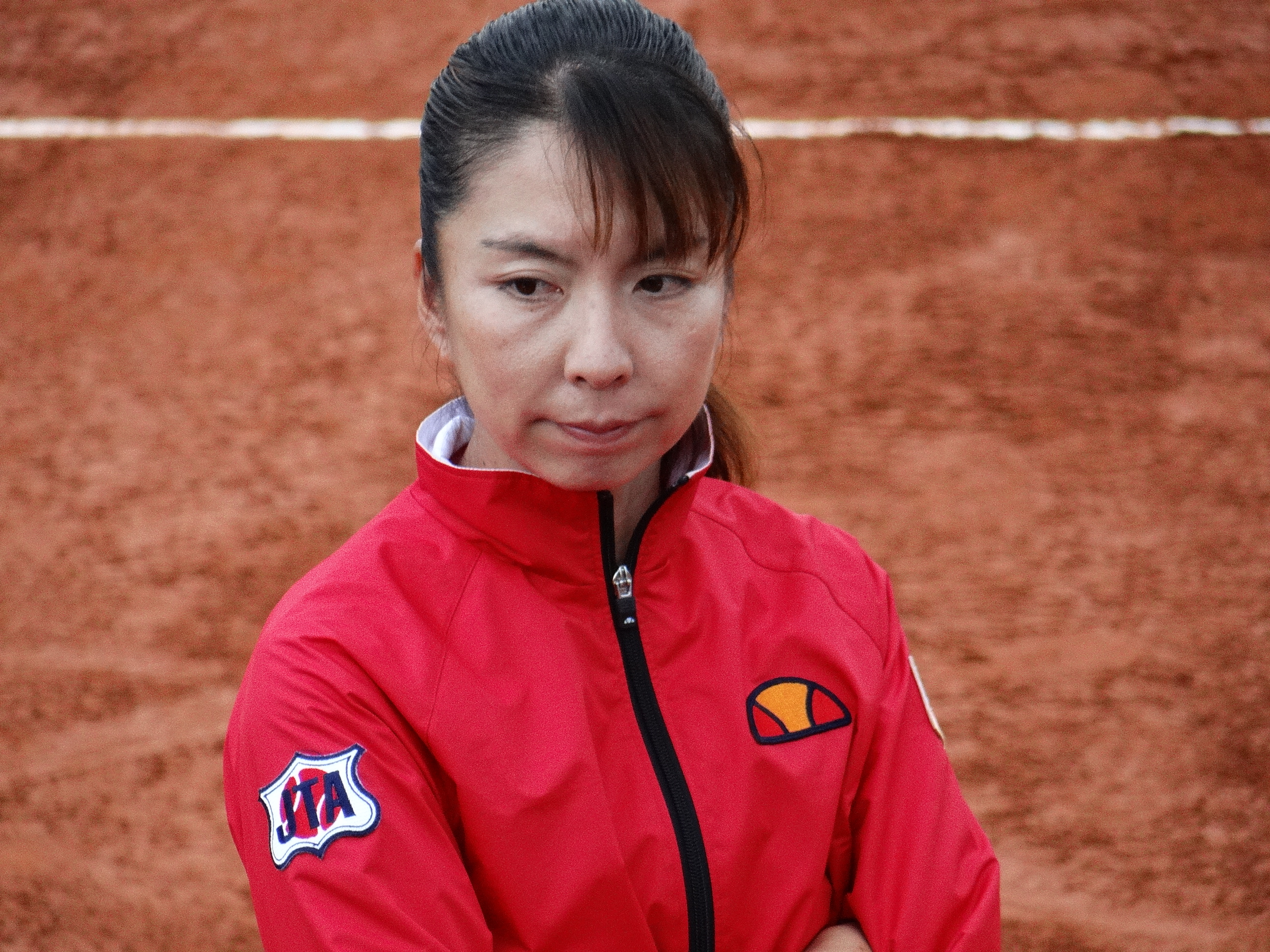
- Country (sports): Japan
- Residence: Yokohama, Japan
- Born: 1 April 1976 (age 49) Tottori Prefecture, Japan
- Height: 1.61 m (5 ft 3 in)
- Turned pro: 1994
- Plays: Right-handed (two-handed backhand)
- Prize money: $669,605

Singles
- Career record: 274–262
- Career titles: 5 ITF
- Highest ranking: No. 52 (8 September 1997)

Grand Slam singles results
- Australian Open: 2R (1997, 1998)
- French Open: 2R (1997)
- Wimbledon: 2R (1997)
- US Open: 2R (1997)

Doubles
- Career record: 188–174
- Career titles: 3 WTA, 7 ITF
- Highest ranking: No. 51 (3 May 1999)

Yuka Kaneko (née Yuka Yoshida, Japanese: 吉田友佳, born 1 April 1976) is a former professional tennis player from Japan.

In her career, she won three doubles titles on the WTA Tour: 1995 in Tokyo, 1996 in Pattaya, and 2005 in Memphis.

Kaneko also won five singles and seven doubles titles on the ITF Circuit.

Her best Grand Slam performance came in 1998 when she reached the quarterfinals of the doubles tournament of the US Open.

== WTA career finals ==
Legend	Singles	Doubles
Grand Slam	0–0	0–0
Tier I	0–0	0–0
Tier II	0–0	0–0
Tier III	0–0	2–1
Tier IV & V	0–1	1–1

=== Singles: 1 (runner-up) ===
Result	No.	Date	Tournament	Surface	Opponent	Score
Loss	1.	Apr 1997	Danamon Open, Indonesia	Clay	(Japan) Naoko Sawamatsu	3–6, 2–6

=== Doubles: 5 (3 titles, 2 runner-ups) ===
Result	No.	Date	Tournament	Surface	Partner	Opponents	Score
Win	1.	Apr 1995	Japan Open, Tokyo	Hard	(Japan) Miho Saeki	(Japan) Kyoko Nagatsuka (Japan) Ai Sugiyama	6–7^{(5–7)}, 6–4, 7–6^{(7–5)}
Win	2.	Nov 1996	Pattaya Open, Thailand	Hard	(Japan) Miho Saeki	(Slovenia) Tina Križan (Japan) Nana Miyagi	6–2, 6–3
Loss	3.	Apr 1997	Danamon Open, Indonesia	Hard	(Czech Republic) Lenka Němečková	(Australia) Kerry-Anne Guse (Australia) Kristine Radford	4–6, 7–5, 5–7
Loss	4.	Nov 1999	Kuala Lumpur, Malaysia	Clay	(Japan) Rika Hiraki	(Croatia) Jelena Kostanić (Slovenia) Tina Pisnik	6–3, 2–6, 4–6
Win	5.	Feb 2005	Memphis Indoors, United States	Hard (i)	(Japan) Miho Saeki	(United States) Laura Granville (United States) Abigail Spears	6–3, 6–4

== ITF Circuit finals ==
$100,000 tournaments
$75,000 tournaments
$50,000 tournaments
$25,000 tournaments
$10,000 tournaments

=== Singles: 10 (5–5) ===
Result	No.	Date	Tournament	Surface	Opponent	Score
Win	1.	10 October 1993	ITF Ibaraki, Japan	Hard (i)	(Australia) Lisa McShea	3–6, 6–2, 7–5
Loss	2.	15 March 1996	ITF Rockford, United States	Hard	(Russia) Anna Kournikova	1–6, 4–6
Loss	3.	20 February 2000	ITF Midland, United States	Hard	(Australia) Nicole Pratt	4–6, 3–6
Loss	4.	24 September 2000	ITF Kirkland, United States	Hard	(United States) Brie Rippner	3–6, 2–6
Win	5.	3 March 2002	ITF Bendigo, Australia	Hard	(Australia) Cindy Watson	6–1, 7–6
Loss	6.	3 March 2003	ITF Bendigo	Hard	(Australia) Rachel McQuillan	0–6, 2–6
Win	7.	20 April 2003	ITF Ho Chi Minh City, Vietnam	Hard	(Japan) Shiho Hisamatsu	6–3, 5–7, 6–2
Win	8.	19 October 2003	ITF Haibara, Japan	Hard	(Japan) Seiko Okamoto	6–1, 6–4
Win	9.	2 November 2003	ITF Beijing, China	Hard (i)	(China) Xie Yanze	6–1, 7–6^{(2)}
Loss	10.	24 October 2004	ITF Haibara, Japan	Carpet	(Japan) Aiko Nakamura	1–6, 4–6

=== Doubles: 15 (7–8) ===
Result	No.	Date	Tournament	Surface	Partner	Opponents	Score
Loss	1.	7 June 1993	ITF Seoul, South Korea	Hard	(Japan) Kazue Takuma	(Indonesia) Mimma Chernovita (Indonesia) Irawati Moerid	5–7, 6–2, 3–6
Win	2.	5 July 1993	ITF Lohja, Finland	Clay	(Japan) Hiroko Mochizuki	(Netherlands) Stephanie Gomperts (Netherlands) Annemarie Mikkers	6–2, 6–7, 6–4
Loss	3.	7 March 1994	ITF Offenbach, Germany	Carpet	(Japan) Hiroko Mochizuki	(Germany) Sandra Wächtershäuser (Germany) Petra Winzenhöller	6–7, 3–6
Win	4.	21 August 1994	ITF Fayetteville, United States	Hard	(Japan) Ai Sugiyama	(United States) Andrea Leand (United States) Eleni Rossides	6–4, 7–5
Loss	5.	6 August 1995	ITF Austin, United States	Hard	(Japan) Naoko Kijimuta	(United States) Shannan McCarthy (United States) Julie Steven	4–6, 3–6
Loss	6.	21 March 1999	ITF Noda, Japan	Hard	(Japan) Shinobu Asagoe	(South Korea) Cho Yoon-jeong (South Korea) Park Sung-hee	3–6, 3–6
Loss	7.	24 October 1999	ITF Nashville, United States	Hard	(Japan) Shinobu Asagoe	(United States) Nicole Arendt (United States) Katie Schlukebir	1–6, 6–7
Win	8.	3 April 2000	ITF West Palm Beach, United States	Clay	(Japan) Rika Hiraki	(United States) Erika deLone (Australia) Nicole Pratt	1–6, 6–0, 7–6^{(5)}
Win	9.	7 May 2000	ITF Gifu, Japan	Hard	(Japan) Shinobu Asagoe	(South Africa) Nannie de Villiers (South Africa) Surina De Beer	6–3, 6–1
Loss	10.	8 July 2001	Los Gatos, United States	Hard	(Japan) Ryoko Takemura	(United States) Dawn Buth (Canada) Vanessa Webb	2–6, 6–7
Loss	11.	30 June 2002	ITF Edmond, United States	Hard	(Japan) Satomi Kinjo	(United States) Lauren Kalvaria (United States) Gabriela Lastra	1–6, 4–6
Loss	12.	7 July 2002	ITF Los Gatos, United States	Hard	(Japan) Ryoko Takemura	(United States) Teryn Ashley (Canada) Vanessa Webb	3–6, 4–6
Win	13.	14 July 2002	ITF College Park, United States	Hard	(Japan) Miho Saeki	(United States) Teryn Ashley (United States) Jennifer Russell	7–5, 6–1
Win	14.	20 October 2002	ITF Haibara, Japan	Carpet	(Japan) Remi Tezuka	(Japan) Haruka Inoue (Japan) Maiko Inoue	6–0, 6–2
Win	15.	6 July 2003	ITF Los Gatos, United States	Hard	(Japan) Shiho Hisamatsu	(United States) Tanner Cochran (United States) Shenay Perry	6–4, 3–6, 6–2
