= 1996 Nokia Open – Doubles =

Doubles
- 1996 Salem Open Beijing and the Nokia Open
- 1995 Champions: (Germany) Claudia Porwik (United States) Linda Wild

Final
- Champions: (Japan) Naoko Kijimuta (Japan) Miho Saeki
- Runners-up: (Japan) Yuko Hosoki (Japan) Kazue Takuma
- Score: 7–5, 6–4

Details
- Seeds: 4

Events
Singles	men	women
Doubles	men	women
← 1995 ·	Salem Open Beijing	· 1997 →
← 1995 ·	Nokia Open	· 1997 →

Claudia Porwik and Linda Wild were the defending champions but did not compete that year.

Naoko Kijimuta and Miho Saeki lost in the final 7–5, 6–4 against Yuko Hosoki and Kazue Takuma.

== Seeds ==
Champion seeds are indicated in bold text while text in italics indicates the round in which those seeds were eliminated.

1. (Japan) Rika Hiraki / (Japan) Nana Miyagi (first round)
2. (South Korea) Sung-Hee Park / (Chinese Taipei) Shi-Ting Wang (semifinals)
3. (Japan) **Naoko Kijimuta** / (Japan) **Miho Saeki (champions)**
4. (Germany) Silke Meier / (Australia) Louise Pleming (quarterfinals)

== Draw ==
=== Key ===
- Q = Qualifier
- WC = Wild card
- LL = Lucky loser
- Alt = Alternate
- SE = Special exempt
- PR = Protected ranking
- ITF = ITF entry
- JE = Junior exempt
- w/o = Walkover
- r = Retired
- d = Defaulted
- SR = Special ranking

First round
1	(Japan) R Hiraki (Japan) N Miyagi	5	**6**	5
(Slovenia) **T Križan** (France) **N van Lottum**	**7**	3	**7**
(Japan) **Y Hosoki** (Japan) **K Takuma**	**6**	**6**
(China) L-L Chen (China) J-Q Yi	3	1
4	(Germany) **S Meier** (Australia) **L Pleming**	**7^{7}**	**7**
(China) J Chen (China) L Li	6^{3}	5
(Israel) H Rosen (Chinese Taipei) T-T Weng	2	3
(Japan) **H Nagano** (Japan) **K Shibata**	**6**	**6**
Q	(Italy) F Lubiani (Austria) M Schnell	4	3
(Thailand) **B Sangaram** (Thailand) **T Tanasugarn**	**6**	**6**
(Japan) H Mochizuki (Japan) S Obata	3	**7^{8}**	4
3	(Japan) **N Kijimuta** (Japan) **M Saeki**	**6**	6^{6}	**6**
(France) **N Dechy** (Germany) **S Klösel**	5	**6**	**6**
(South Korea) Y-J Choi (South Korea) M-R Jeon	**7**	4	2
WC	(China) Y Chen (China) L Liu	1	**6**	2
2	(South Korea) **S-H Park** (Chinese Taipei) **S-T Wang**	**6**	4	**6**

Quarterfinals
(Slovenia) T Križan (France) N van Lottum	5	2
(Japan) **Y Hosoki** (Japan) **K Takuma**	**7**	**6**
4	(Germany) S Meier (Australia) L Pleming	3	3
(Japan) **H Nagano** (Japan) **K Shibata**	**6**	**6**
(Thailand) B Sangaram (Thailand) T Tanasugarn	4	1
3	(Japan) **N Kijimuta** (Japan) **M Saeki**	**6**	**6**
(France) N Dechy (Germany) S Klösel	**6**	2	1
2	(South Korea) **S-H Park** (Chinese Taipei) **S-T Wang**	4	**6**	**6**

Semifinals
(Japan) **Y Hosoki** (Japan) **K Takuma**	**7^{7}**	**6**
(Japan) H Nagano (Japan) K Shibata	6^{3}	1
3	(Japan) **N Kijimuta** (Japan) **M Saeki**	**6**	4	**6**
2	(South Korea) S-H Park (Chinese Taipei) S-T Wang	3	**6**	3

Final
(Japan) Yuko Hosoki (Japan) Kazue Takuma	5	4
3	(Japan) **Naoko Kijimuta** (Japan) **Miho Saeki**	**7**	**6**
