= 1995 Nokia Open – Women's doubles =

Women's doubles
- 1995 Nokia Open

Final
- Champions: (Germany) Claudia Porwik (United States) Linda Wild
- Runners-up: (Netherlands) Stephanie Rottier (Chinese Taipei) Wang Shi-ting
- Score: 6–1, 6–0

Events
Singles	men	women
Doubles	men	women
← 1994 ·	China Open	· 1996 →

Chen Li and Li Fang were the defending champions, but lost in the quarterfinals to tournament winners Claudia Porwik and Linda Wild.

Porwik and Wild won the title by defeating Stephanie Rottier and Wang Shi-ting 6–1, 6–0 in the final.

== Seeds ==
1. (Germany) Claudia Porwik / (United States) Linda Wild (champions)
2. (Indonesia) Yayuk Basuki / (Germany) Karin Kschwendt (semifinals, withdrew)
3. (Australia) Kristin Godridge / (United States) Laxmi Poruri (first round)
4. (United States) Ann Grossman / (United States) Shaun Stafford (quarterfinals)

== Draw ==
=== Key ===
- Q = Qualifier
- WC = Wild card
- LL = Lucky loser
- Alt = Alternate
- SE = Special exempt
- PR = Protected ranking
- ITF = ITF entry
- JE = Junior exempt
- w/o = Walkover
- r = Retired
- d = Defaulted
- SR = Special ranking

=== Draw ===
First round
1	(Germany) C Porwik (United States) L Wild	6	6
(South Korea) E-h Kim (South Korea) Kim Il-sook	0	1
WC	(China) L Chen (China) F Li	w/o
(South Africa) L Horn (Belgium) D Monami
3	(Australia) K Godridge (United States) L Poruri	4	6	3
(Romania) C Cristea (Netherlands) P Kamstra	6	4	6
(United States) M Tu (United States) J Watanabe	2	5
(France) L Ghirardi-Rubbi (France) S Pitkowski	6	7
(Netherlands) S Rottier (Chinese Taipei) S-t Wang	5	7^{7}	6
(Australia) V Lake (United Kingdom) L Pleming	7	6^{5}	0
Q	(China) Y Bi (China) Liu Li	4	1
4	(United States) A Grossman (United States) S Stafford	6	6
(United States) S Reece (United States) D Scott	6	6
(Netherlands) K de Weille (Ukraine) E Tatarkova	2	3
(Ukraine) E Brioukhovets (South Africa) T Price	2	4
2	(Indonesia) Y Basuki (Germany) K Kschwendt	6	6

Quarterfinals
1	(Germany) C Porwik (United States) L Wild	6	6
WC	(China) L Chen (China) F Li	3	3
(Romania) C Cristea (Netherlands) P Kamstra	0	6^{7}
(France) L Ghirardi-Rubbi (France) S Pitkowski	6	7^{9}
(Netherlands) S Rottier (Chinese Taipei) S-t Wang	6	6
4	(United States) A Grossman (United States) S Stafford	3	3
(United States) S Reece (United States) D Scott	6	3	2
2	(Indonesia) Y Basuki (Germany) K Kschwendt	2	6	6

Semifinals
1	(Germany) C Porwik (United States) L Wild	6	6
(France) L Ghirardi-Rubbi (France) S Pitkowski	3	0
(Netherlands) S Rottier (Chinese Taipei) S-t Wang	w/o
2	(Indonesia) Y Basuki (Germany) K Kschwendt

Final
1	(Germany) C Porwik (United States) L Wild	6	6
(Netherlands) S Rottier (Chinese Taipei) S-t Wang	1	0
