= 1995 Nokia Open – Men's doubles =

Men's doubles
- 1995 Nokia Open

Final
- Champions: (United States) Tommy Ho (Canada) Sébastien Lareau
- Runners-up: (Belgium) Dick Norman (Netherlands) Fernon Wibier
- Score: 7–6, 7–6

Details
- Draw: 16
- Seeds: 4

Events
Singles	men	women
Doubles	men	women
← 1994 ·	Nokia Open	· 1996 →

Tommy Ho and Kent Kinnear were the defending champions, but Kinnear did not participate this year. Ho partnered Sébastien Lareau, successfully defending his title.

Ho and Lareau won the title, defeating Dick Norman and Fernon Wibier 7–6, 7–6 in the final.

== Seeds ==
1. (United States) Tommy Ho / (Canada) Sébastien Lareau (champions)
2. (South Africa) David Adams / (India) Leander Paes (quarterfinals)
3. (Australia) Joshua Eagle / (Australia) Andrew Florent (first round)
4. (Australia) Andrew Kratzmann / (Australia) Paul Kilderry (quarterfinals)

== Draw ==
=== Key ===
- Q = Qualifier
- WC = Wild card
- LL = Lucky loser
- Alt = Alternate
- SE = Special exempt
- PR = Protected ranking
- ITF = ITF entry
- JE = Junior exempt
- w/o = Walkover
- r = Retired
- d = Defaulted
- SR = Special ranking

=== Draw ===
First round
1	(United States) T Ho (Canada) S Lareau	6	6
WC	(Canada) A Chang (United States) C Chang	3	3
WC	(China) B Pan (China) J Xia	2	6
(United Kingdom) M Petchey (United States) B Shelton	6	7
4	(Australia) A Kratzmann (Australia) P Kilderry	7	6
Q	(South Korea) H-t Lee (South Korea) Y-i Yoon	6	3
(United States) K Flach (United States) K Jones	6	6
(Australia) S Draper (Australia) P Tramacchi	3	3
(United Kingdom) A Foster (United Kingdom) D Sapsford	3	4
(Japan) S Matsuoka (Australia) M Tebbutt	6	6
(Belgium) D Norman (Netherlands) F Wibier	7	7
3	(Australia) J Eagle (Australia) A Florent	6	6
WC	(China) Guo Jian (China) Xu Xin	6	3
(United Kingdom) T Henman (United Kingdom) A Richardson	7	6
(South Africa) D Nainkin (Israel) E Ran	3	4
2	(South Africa) D Adams (India) L Paes	6	6

Quarterfinals
1	(United States) T Ho (Canada) S Lareau	6	3	7
(United Kingdom) M Petchey (United States) B Shelton	4	6	6
4	(Australia) A Kratzmann (Australia) P Kilderry	3	6
(United States) K Flach (United States) K Jones	6	7
(Japan) S Matsuoka (Australia) M Tebbutt	4	6
(Belgium) D Norman (Netherlands) F Wibier	6	7
(United Kingdom) T Henman (United Kingdom) A Richardson	4	6	6
2	(South Africa) D Adams (India) L Paes	6	3	4

Semifinals
1	(United States) T Ho (Canada) S Lareau	6	6
(United States) K Flach (United States) K Jones	3	4
(Belgium) D Norman (Netherlands) F Wibier	6	1	6
(United Kingdom) T Henman (United Kingdom) A Richardson	3	6	3

Final
1	(United States) T Ho (Canada) S Lareau	7	7
(Belgium) D Norman (Netherlands) F Wibier	6	6
