= 1996 Salem Open Beijing and the Nokia Open =

1996 Salem Open Beijing and Nokia Open
- Date: October 7–13 (men); October 14–20 (women)
- Edition: 4th (men) / 3rd (women)
- Location: Beijing, China

Champions

Men's singles
- (United Kingdom) Greg Rusedski

Women's singles
- (Chinese Taipei) Wang Shi-ting

Men's doubles
- (Czech Republic) Martin Damm / (Russia) Andrei Olhovskiy

Women's doubles
- (Japan) Naoko Kijimuta / (Japan) Miho Saeki
- Salem Open Beijing Nokia Open

The 1996 Salem Open Beijing and the Nokia Open were tennis tournaments. The men's tournament was played on indoor carpet courts while the women's tournament was played on indoor hard courts. Both events were held in Beijing, China and were part of the World Series of the 1996 ATP Tour and of Tier IV of the 1996 WTA Tour. The men's tournament was held from October 7 through October 13, 1996, while the women's tournament was held from October 14 through October 20, 1996. Greg Rusedski and Wang Shi-ting won the singles titles.

== Finals ==
=== Men's singles ===
(United Kingdom) Greg Rusedski defeated (Czech Republic) Martin Damm 7–6^{(7–5)}, 6–4

- It was Rusedski's 2nd title of the year and the 5th of his career.

=== Women's singles ===
(Chinese Taipei) Wang Shi-ting defeated (China) Chen Li-Ling 6–3, 6–4

- It was Wang's 2nd title of the year and the 6th of her career.

=== Men's doubles ===
(Czech Republic) Martin Damm / (Russia) Andrei Olhovskiy defeated (Germany) Patrik Kühnen / (South Africa) Gary Muller 6–4, 7–5

- It was Damm's only title of the year and the 8th of his career. It was Olhovskiy's 4th title of the year and the 14th of his career.

=== Women's doubles ===
(Japan) Naoko Kijimuta / (Japan) Miho Saeki defeated (Japan) Yuko Hosoki / (Japan) Kazue Takuma 7–5, 6–4

- It was Kijimuta's 2nd title of the year and the 2nd of her career. It was Saeki's 1st title of the year and the 2nd of her career.
