= 1995 Nokia Open – Women's singles =

Women's singles
- 1995 Nokia Open

Final
- Champion: (United States) Linda Wild
- Runner-up: (Chinese Taipei) Wang Shi-ting
- Score: 7–5, 6–2

Details
- Draw: 32 (2WC/4Q)
- Seeds: 8

Events
Singles	men	women
Doubles	men	women
← 1994 ·	China Open	· 1996 →

Yayuk Basuki was the defending champion, but lost in the second round to tournament winner Linda Wild.

Wild won the tournament by defeating Wang Shi-ting 7–5, 6–2 in the final.

== Seeds ==
1. (Indonesia) Yayuk Basuki (second round)
2. (Belgium) Dominique Monami (first round, retired)
3. (Chinese Taipei) Wang Shi-ting (final)
4. (Germany) Karin Kschwendt (first round)
5. (France) Lea Ghirardi-Rubbi (second round)
6. (Netherlands) Petra Kamstra (quarterfinals)
7. (United States) Shaun Stafford (semifinals)
8. (Netherlands) Stephanie Rottier (second round)

== Draw ==
=== Key ===
- Q = Qualifier
- WC = Wild card
- LL = Lucky loser
- Alt = Alternate
- SE = Special exempt
- PR = Protected ranking
- ITF = ITF entry
- JE = Junior exempt
- w/o = Walkover
- r = Retired
- d = Defaulted
- SR = Special ranking

=== Finals ===
Semifinals
(United States) Linda Wild	6	6
(Australia) Kristin Godridge	2	0
3	(Chinese Taipei) Wang Shi-ting	6	2	6
7	(United States) Shaun Stafford	4	6	3

Final
(United States) Linda Wild	7	6
3	(Chinese Taipei) Wang Shi-ting	5	2

=== Top half ===
First round
1	(Indonesia) Y Basuki	3	6	6
(Hong Kong) M Tang	6	3	3
(United States) L Poruri	5	2
(United States) L Wild	7	6
Q	(South Korea) M-r Jeon	2	6	7^{7}
(United States) M Tu	6	4	6^{5}
(Germany) C Porwik	6	5	6^{3}
5	(France) L Ghirardi-Rubbi	0	7	7^{7}
4	(Germany) K Kschwendt	7	4	5
WC	(China) J Chen	5	6	7
(Australia) K Godridge	6	6
Q	(Ukraine) E Brioukhovets	1	2
(United States) A Grossman	6	6
Q	(South Korea) E-h Kim	0	4
(China) J-Q Yi	4	6^{6}
8	(Netherlands) S Rottier	6	7^{8}

Second round
1	(Indonesia) Y Basuki	0	5
(United States) L Wild	6	7
Q	(South Korea) M-r Jeon	6	6
5	(France) L Ghirardi-Rubbi	2	2
WC	(China) J Chen	2	2
(Australia) K Godridge	6	6
(United States) A Grossman	6	7
8	(Netherlands) S Rottier	3	5

Quarterfinals
(United States) L Wild	6	6
Q	(South Korea) M-r Jeon	1	4
(Australia) K Godridge	6^{3}	6	7^{7}
(United States) A Grossman	7^{7}	2	6^{4}

Semifinals
(United States) L Wild	6	6
(Australia) K Godridge	2	0

=== Bottom half ===
First round
6	(Netherlands) P Kamstra	6	5	6
(Romania) C Cristea	1	7	2
(United States) J Watanabe	7^{7}	7
(China) L Chen	6^{3}	5
(South Korea) J-y Choi	6	2	2
(South Africa) T Price	4	6	6
(France) S Pitkowski	0	6	1
3	(Chinese Taipei) S-t Wang	6	4	6
7	(United States) S Stafford	6	6
(Germany) P Winzenhöller	2	3
(China) F Li	6	6
(United States) E Rossides	3	0
(Netherlands) K de Weille	3	3
WC	(China) L Li	6	6
Q	(Ukraine) E Tatarkova	7^{7}	6
2	(Belgium) D Monami	6^{5}	5^{r}

Second round
6	(Netherlands) P Kamstra	6	6
(United States) J Watanabe	1	0
(South Africa) T Price	5	2
3	(Chinese Taipei) S-t Wang	7	6
7	(United States) S Stafford	6	6
(China) F Li	4	1
WC	(China) L Li	6^{5}	6^{6}
Q	(Ukraine) E Tatarkova	7^{7}	7^{8}

Quarterfinals
6	(Netherlands) P Kamstra	3	4
3	(Chinese Taipei) S-t Wang	6	6
7	(United States) S Stafford	6	6
Q	(Ukraine) E Tatarkova	1	4

Semifinals
3	(Chinese Taipei) S-t Wang	6	2	6
7	(United States) S Stafford	4	6	3
