= 1996 Salem Open Beijing – Doubles =

Doubles
- 1996 Salem Open Beijing and the Nokia Open

Final
- Champions: (Czech Republic) Martin Damm (Russia) Andrei Olhovskiy
- Runners-up: (Germany) Patrik Kühnen (South Africa) Gary Muller
- Score: 6–4, 7–5

Details
- Draw: 16
- Seeds: 4

Events
Singles	men	women
Doubles	men	women
← 1995 ·	Salem Open Beijing	· 1997 →
← 1995 ·	Nokia Open	· 1997 →

Tommy Ho and Sébastien Lareau were the defending champions but only Lareau competed that year with Brian MacPhie.

Lareau and MacPhie lost in the quarterfinals to Joshua Eagle and Andrew Florent.

Martin Damm and Andrei Olhovskiy won in the final 6–4, 7–5 against Patrik Kühnen and Gary Muller.

== Seeds ==
1. (Czech Republic) Martin Damm / (Russia) Andrei Olhovskiy (champions)
2. (South Africa) David Adams / (Netherlands) Sjeng Schalken (quarterfinals)
3. (Canada) Sébastien Lareau / (United States) Brian MacPhie (quarterfinals)
4. (United States) Kent Kinnear / (United States) Jonathan Stark (semifinals)

== Draw ==
=== Key ===
- Q = Qualifier
- WC = Wild card
- LL = Lucky loser
- Alt = Alternate
- SE = Special exempt
- PR = Protected ranking
- ITF = ITF entry
- JE = Junior exempt
- w/o = Walkover
- r = Retired
- d = Defaulted
- SR = Special ranking

First round
1	(Czech Republic) M Damm (Russia) A Olhovskiy	7	6
(Argentina) J Frana (Venezuela) N Pereira	6	1
WC	(China) Y-W Wang (China) Y Zhang	0	3
(United States) D DiLucia (United States) S Humphries	6	6
3	(Canada) S Lareau (United States) B MacPhie	7	7
WC	(China) B Pan (China) J Xia	5	5
(France) J-P Fleurian (The Bahamas) R Smith	1	3
(Australia) J Eagle (Australia) A Florent	6	6
(Zimbabwe) B Black (United States) V Spadea	7	4	3
(United Kingdom) M Petchey (Italy) L Tieleman	6	6	6
WC	(China) L Lu (China) X Xu	4	2
4	(United States) K Kinnear (United States) J Stark	6	6
(India) M Bhupathi (India) L Paes	3	7	6
(Germany) P Kühnen (South Africa) G Muller	6	6	7
Q	(Australia) S Draper (South Africa) C Haggard	2	4
2	(South Africa) D Adams (Netherlands) S Schalken	6	6

Quarterfinals
1	(Czech Republic) M Damm (Russia) A Olhovskiy	6	6
(United States) D DiLucia (United States) S Humphries	4	3
3	(Canada) S Lareau (United States) B MacPhie	5	7	4
(Australia) J Eagle (Australia) A Florent	7	5	6
(United Kingdom) M Petchey (Italy) L Tieleman	6	4	6
4	(United States) K Kinnear (United States) J Stark	2	6	7
(Germany) P Kühnen (South Africa) G Muller	6	6	6
2	(South Africa) D Adams (Netherlands) S Schalken	3	7	4

Semifinals
1	(Czech Republic) M Damm (Russia) A Olhovskiy	7	3	6
(Australia) J Eagle (Australia) A Florent	6	6	3
4	(United States) K Kinnear (United States) J Stark	3	4
(Germany) P Kühnen (South Africa) G Muller	6	6

Final
1	(Czech Republic) M Damm (Russia) A Olhovskiy	6	7
(Germany) P Kühnen (South Africa) G Muller	4	5
