= 1994 Salem Open-Beijing =

1994 Salem Open-Beijing and Nokia Open
- Date: October 17–23
- Edition: 2nd
- Prize money: $295,000 (men) $100,000 (women)
- Surface: Carpet / indoor
- Location: Beijing, China

Champions

Men's singles
- (United States) Michael Chang

Women's singles
- (Indonesia) Yayuk Basuki

Men's doubles
- (United States) Tommy Ho / (United States) Kent Kinnear

Women's doubles
- (China) Chen Li-Ling / (China) Fang Li
| ← 1993 · | Salem Open-Beijing | · 1995 → |
| ← 1993 · | Nokia Open | · 1995 → |

The 1994 Salem Open-Beijing was a tennis tournament played on indoor carpet courts in Beijing, China the men's event was part of the World Series of the 1994 ATP Tour, the women's event was part of the Tier IV of the 1994 WTA Tour. The men's tournament was held from October 17 to October 23, 1994 while the women's was held from February 14 to February 20, 1994.

== Finals ==
=== Men's singles ===
(United States) Michael Chang defeated (Sweden) Anders Järryd, 7–5, 7–5

=== Women's singles ===
(Indonesia) Yayuk Basuki defeated (Japan) Kyōko Nagatsuka, 6–4, 6–2

=== Men's doubles ===
(United States) Tommy Ho / (United States) Kent Kinnear defeated (South Africa) David Adams / (Russia) Andrei Olhovskiy, 7–6, 6–3

=== Women's doubles ===
(China) Chen Li-Ling / (China) Fang Li defeated (Australia) Kerry-Anne Guse / (United Kingdom) Valda Lake, 6–0, 6–2
