= 1997 Australian Open – Women's singles qualifying =

Women's singles qualifying
- 1997 Australian Open

Events
Singles	men	women		boys	girls
Doubles	men	women	mixed	boys	girls
WC Singles	men	women	quad
WC Doubles	men	women	quad
Legends	men	women	mixed

Qualification
Singles	men	women
- Australian Open

This article displays the qualifying draw for women's singles at the 1997 Australian Open.

== Seeds ==
1. (Austria) Marion Maruska (first round)
2. (Japan) Yuka Yoshida (qualified)
3. (Spain) Magüi Serna (qualified)
4. (Germany) Andrea Glass (second round)
5. (Japan) Miho Saeki (qualified)
6. (France) Noëlle van Lottum (qualifying competition, lucky loser)
7. (United States) Debbie Graham (first round)
8. (Argentina) Mercedes Paz (first round)
9. (Canada) Jana Nejedly (first round)
10. (Czech Republic) Sandra Kleinová (qualifying competition, lucky loser)
11. (Italy) Laura Golarsa (qualified)
12. (Israel) Anna Smashnova (first round)
13. (Poland) Magdalena Grzybowska (qualified)
14. (United States) Erika deLone (first round)
15. (Argentina) Mariana Díaz Oliva (qualifying competition)
16. (United Kingdom) Samantha Smith (second round)

== Qualifiers ==
1. (Poland) Magdalena Grzybowska
2. (Italy) Laura Golarsa
3. (Spain) Magüi Serna
4. (United States) Kristina Brandi
5. (Japan) Miho Saeki
6. (Germany) Marketa Kochta
7. (United States) Meilen Tu
8. (Japan) Yuka Yoshida

== Lucky losers ==
1. (France) Noëlle van Lottum
2. (Czech Republic) Sandra Kleinová

== Qualifying draw ==
Key

- Q = Qualifier
- WC = Wild card
- LL = Lucky loser
- Alt = Alternate
- ITF = ITF entry
- PR = Protected ranking
- SR = Special ranking
- SE = Special exempt
- JE = Junior exempt
- JR = Junior Accelerator Programme entrant
- CO = College Accelerator Programme entrant
- NG = Next Gen Accelerator Program entrant
- w/o = Walkover
- r = Retired
- d = Defaulted

=== First qualifier ===
First round
1	(Austria) Marion Maruska	6	5	4
(Japan) Haruka Inoue	4	7	6
(Italy) Natalia Baudone-Furlan	6	6
WC	(Australia) Trudi Musgrave	3	4
(Georgia (country)) Nino Louarsabishvili	6	2	6
WC	(Australia) Melissa Beadman	3	6	4
(Slovenia) Tina Križan	5	0
13	(Poland) Magdalena Grzybowska	7	6

Second round
(Japan) Haruka Inoue	6	6
(Italy) Natalia Baudone-Furlan	1	1
(Georgia (country)) Nino Louarsabishvili	4	4
13	(Poland) Magdalena Grzybowska	6	6

Qualifying competition
(Japan) Haruka Inoue	3	0
13	(Poland) Magdalena Grzybowska	6	6

=== Second qualifier ===
First round
11	(Italy) Laura Golarsa	6	6
(United States) Lilia Osterloh	2	1
(Germany) Sandra Klösel	1	4
WC	(Australia) Catherine Barclay	6	6
(France) Amélie Mauresmo	6	7
WC	(Australia) Renee Reid	3	5
(Israel) Hila Rosen	6^{4}	0
6	(France) Noëlle van Lottum	7^{7}	6

Second round
11	(Italy) Laura Golarsa	6	6
WC	(Australia) Catherine Barclay	3	3
(France) Amélie Mauresmo	1	1
6	(France) Noëlle van Lottum	6	6

Qualifying competition
11	(Italy) Laura Golarsa	6	6
6	(France) Noëlle van Lottum	0	2

=== Third qualifier ===
First round
3	(Spain) Magüi Serna	6	6
(Hungary) Virág Csurgó	0	3
(Japan) Kazue Takuma	7^{7}	4	5
(Czech Republic) Eva Martincová	6^{2}	6	7
WC	(Australia) Nicole Pratt	6	6
(Czech Republic) Alena Vašková	3	1
(Greece) Christína Papadáki	6	3	5
10	(Czech Republic) Sandra Kleinová	3	6	7

Second round
3	(Spain) Magüi Serna	6	6
(Czech Republic) Eva Martincová	2	1
WC	(Australia) Nicole Pratt	0	1
10	(Czech Republic) Sandra Kleinová	6	6

Qualifying competition
3	(Spain) Magüi Serna	4	6	6
10	(Czech Republic) Sandra Kleinová	6	3	4

=== Fourth qualifier ===
First round
16	(United Kingdom) Samantha Smith	6	6^{5}	6
(Belgium) Daphne van de Zande	2	7^{7}	2
(Australia) Kerry-Anne Guse	1	4
(Belarus) Olga Barabanschikova	6	6
(China) Yi Jing-Qian	4	2
(Czech Republic) Ludmila Varmužová	6	6
(United States) Kristina Brandi	6	6
7	(United States) Debbie Graham	2	1

Second round
16	(United Kingdom) Samantha Smith	1	1
(Belarus) Olga Barabanschikova	6	6
(Czech Republic) Ludmila Varmužová	0	0^{r}
(United States) Kristina Brandi	6	3

Qualifying competition
(Belarus) Olga Barabanschikova	6	2	2
(United States) Kristina Brandi	4	6	6

=== Fifth qualifier ===
First round
5	(Japan) Miho Saeki	6	6
(Mexico) Angélica Gavaldón	4	3
(United States) Janet Lee	6	5	6
(United States) Meghann Shaughnessy	4	7	2
(South Korea) Choi Young-ja	6	5	2
(United States) Jane Chi	1	7	6
(Germany) Marlene Weingärtner	3	5
15	(Argentina) Mariana Díaz Oliva	6	7

Second round
5	(Japan) Miho Saeki	4	6	6
(United States) Janet Lee	6	2	3
(United States) Jane Chi	3	3
15	(Argentina) Mariana Díaz Oliva	6	6

Qualifying competition
5	(Japan) Miho Saeki	6^{5}	7	6
15	(Argentina) Mariana Díaz Oliva	7^{7}	5	3

=== Sixth qualifier ===
First round
14	(United States) Erika deLone	2	3
(Germany) Veronika Martinek	6	6
(Canada) Sonya Jeyaseelan	6	6
WC	(Australia) Lisa McShea	2	1
(Germany) Marketa Kochta	7	6
(Romania) Raluca Sandu	5	1
WC	(Australia) Amanda Grahame	4	2
4	(Germany) Andrea Glass	6	6

Second round
(Germany) Veronika Martinek	4	2
(Canada) Sonya Jeyaseelan	6	6
(Germany) Marketa Kochta	6	6
4	(Germany) Andrea Glass	3	1

Qualifying competition
(Canada) Sonya Jeyaseelan	6	3	3
(Germany) Marketa Kochta	4	6	6

=== Seventh qualifier ===
First round
8	(Argentina) Mercedes Paz	4	2
(Germany) Silke Meier	6	6
(United States) Meilen Tu	6	6
(Hungary) Petra Gáspár	2	3
(Slovakia) Denisa Krajčovičová	3	7	1
(Argentina) María José Gaidano	6	5	6
(Canada) Rene Simpson	6	3	6
9	(Canada) Jana Nejedly	3	6	2

Second round
(Germany) Silke Meier	0	4
(United States) Meilen Tu	6	6
(Argentina) María José Gaidano	6	2	2
(Canada) Rene Simpson	3	6	6

Qualifying competition
(United States) Meilen Tu	6	7
(Canada) Rene Simpson	3	5

=== Eighth qualifier ===
First round
12	(Israel) Anna Smashnova	3	3
(Venezuela) Melissa Mazzotta	6	6
(Russia) Tatiana Panova	5	6	2
(Czech Republic) Lenka Němečková	7	4	6
(India) Nirupama Sanjeev	7	6
(Hungary) Petra Mandula	5	2
WC	(Australia) Jenny Byrne	6	2	3
2	(Japan) Yuka Yoshida	2	6	6

Second round
(Venezuela) Melissa Mazzotta	4	6	6
(Czech Republic) Lenka Němečková	6	3	2
(India) Nirupama Sanjeev	3	4
2	(Japan) Yuka Yoshida	6	6

Qualifying competition
(Venezuela) Melissa Mazzotta	3	6^{4}
2	(Japan) Yuka Yoshida	6	7^{7}
