= Mimma Chernovita =

Indonesian tennis player

- Country (sports): Indonesia
- Born: 11 November 1974 (age 51)
- Prize money: $20,576

Singles
- Career record: 47–71
- Highest ranking: No. 435 (21 June 1993)

Doubles
- Career record: 42–55
- Career titles: 1 ITF
- Highest ranking: No. 335 (12 July 1993)
Medal record
Southeast Asian Games
Gold medal – first place	1995 Chiang Mai	Women's team
Bronze medal – third place	1995 Chiang Mai	Women's doubles
Bronze medal – third place	1995 Chiang Mai	Mixed doubles

Mimma Chernovita (born 11 November 1974) is an Indonesian former professional tennis player.

Chernovita had a career high singles ranking of 435 in the world while competing on the professional tour. She featured in the main draw of WTA Tour tournaments in Jakarta and Surabaya during her career.

At the 1995 Southeast Asian Games in Chiang Mai, Chernovita won three medals for Indonesia, including a gold in the team event.

In 1997 she represented the Indonesia Fed Cup team in a total of four ties. She lost her only singles rubber, to Wang Shi-ting, but won two of her three doubles rubbers, both partnering Eny Sulistyowati.

== ITF finals ==
=== Doubles: 3 (1–2) ===
Result	No.	Date	Tournament	Surface	Partner	Opponents	Score
Loss	1.	1 March 1992	Solo, Indonesia	Hard	(Indonesia) Natalia Soetrisno	(China) Yi Jing-Qian (China) Chen Li	2–6, 2–6
Loss	2.	11 April 1993	Nonthaburi, Thailand	Hard	(Indonesia) Irawati Moerid	(Australia) Nicole Pratt (Indonesia) Suzanna Wibowo	w/o
Win	1.	13 June 1993	Seoul, South Korea	Hard	(Indonesia) Irawati Moerid	(Japan) Kazue Takuma (Japan) Yuka Yoshida	7–5, 2–6, 6–3
