= 1996 Nokia Open – Singles =

Singles
- 1996 Salem Open Beijing and the Nokia Open
- 1995 Champion: (United States) Linda Wild

Final
- Champion: (Chinese Taipei) Wang Shi-ting
- Runner-up: (China) Chen Li-Ling
- Score: 6–3, 6–4

Details
- Seeds: 8

Events
Singles	men	women
Doubles	men	women
← 1995 ·	Salem Open Beijing	· 1997 →
← 1995 ·	Nokia Open	· 1997 →

Linda Wild was the defending champion but lost in the quarterfinals to Tamarine Tanasugarn.

Fifth-seeded Wang Shi-ting won in the final 6–3, 6–4 against Chen Li-Ling.

== Seeds ==
A champion seed is indicated in bold text while text in italics indicates the round in which that seed was eliminated.

1. (United States) Linda Wild (quarterfinals)
2. (Indonesia) Yayuk Basuki (quarterfinals)
3. (France) Sandrine Testud (semifinals)
4. (Japan) Naoko Kijimuta (quarterfinals)
5. (Chinese Taipei) **Wang Shi-ting (champion)**
6. (Japan) Mana Endo (quarterfinals)
7. (Japan) Nana Miyagi (second round)
8. (Italy) Francesca Lubiani (second round)

== Draw ==
=== Key ===
- Q = Qualifier
- WC = Wild card
- LL = Lucky loser
- Alt = Alternate
- SE = Special exempt
- PR = Protected ranking
- ITF = ITF entry
- JE = Junior exempt
- w/o = Walkover
- r = Retired
- d = Defaulted
- SR = Special ranking

First round
1	(United States) **L Wild**	**6**	**6**
(Israel) H Rosen	3	0
Q	(Japan) **Y Hosoki**	**6**	**6**
(Japan) R Hiraki	4	4
(Thailand) **T Tanasugarn**	**6**	**7^{7}**
(South Korea) Y-J Choi	2	6^{4}
WC	(China) J Chen	2	3
7	(Japan) **N Miyagi**	**6**	**6**
4	(Japan) **N Kijimuta**	**6**	**6**
(Japan) H Inoue	1	4
WC	(China) **L Li**	**7**	**6**
(United States) C Morariu	5	3
(Japan) Y Yoshida	4	5
(China) **J-Q Yi**	**6**	**7**
Q	(Japan) H Mochizuki	4	4
5	(Chinese Taipei) **S-T Wang**	**6**	**6**
6	(Japan) **M Endo**	**6**	**7**
(Japan) M Saeki	1	5
(South Korea) **S-H Park**	**6**	4	**6**
(France) N Dechy	3	**6**	3
(South Korea) **M-R Jeon**	3	**7**	**7^{7}**
Q	(Japan) S Obata	**6**	5	6^{3}
(Germany) S Klösel	3	0
3	(France) **S Testud**	**6**	**6**
8	(Italy) **F Lubiani**	**7**	**6**
(France) N van Lottum	5	1
(China) **L-L Chen**	**6**	**7^{7}**
(Slovenia) T Križan	4	6^{1}
(Austria) M Schnell	**6**	3	4
Q	(Germany) **S Meier**	3	**6**	**6**
(Italy) A Serra Zanetti	1	6^{2}
2	(Indonesia) **Y Basuki**	**6**	**7^{7}**

Second round
1	(United States) **L Wild**	**6**	**6**
Q	(Japan) Y Hosoki	3	1
(Thailand) **T Tanasugarn**	**6**	**6**
7	(Japan) N Miyagi	1	1
4	(Japan) **N Kijimuta**	**6**	**6**
WC	(China) L Li	1	1
(China) J-Q Yi	5	2
5	(Chinese Taipei) **S-T Wang**	**7**	**6**
6	(Japan) **M Endo**	**7**	**6**
(South Korea) S-H Park	5	0
(South Korea) M-R Jeon	**6**	5	3
3	(France) **S Testud**	2	**7**	**6**
8	(Italy) F Lubiani	3	3
(China) **L-L Chen**	**6**	**6**
Q	(Germany) S Meier	2	1
2	(Indonesia) **Y Basuki**	**6**	**6**

Quarterfinals
1	(United States) L Wild	4	4
(Thailand) **T Tanasugarn**	**6**	**6**
4	(Japan) N Kijimuta	3	4
5	(Chinese Taipei) **S-T Wang**	**6**	**6**
6	(Japan) M Endo	2	**6**	5
3	(France) **S Testud**	**6**	4	**7**
(China) **L-L Chen**	**6**	**6**
2	(Indonesia) Y Basuki	2	2

Semifinals
(Thailand) T Tanasugarn	4	3
5	(Chinese Taipei) **S-T Wang**	**6**	**6**
3	(France) S Testud	**7**	4	4
(China) **L-L Chen**	5	**6**	**6**

Final
5	(Chinese Taipei) **Wang Shi-ting**	**6**	**6**
(China) Chen Li-Ling	3	4
