= 1996 Salem Open Beijing – Singles =

Singles
- 1996 Salem Open Beijing and the Nokia Open

Final
- Champion: (United Kingdom) Greg Rusedski
- Runner-up: (Czech Republic) Martin Damm
- Score: 7–6^{(7–5)}, 6–4

Details
- Draw: 32
- Seeds: 8

Events
Singles	men	women
Doubles	men	women
- Salem Open Beijing Nokia Open

Michael Chang was the defending champion but lost in the second round to Martin Damm.

Greg Rusedski won in the final 7–6^{(7–5)}, 6–4 against Damm.

It was the last ATP tournament in the career of former world number one Mats Wilander.

== Seeds ==
1. (United States) Michael Chang (second round)
2. (Australia) Todd Woodbridge (first round)
3. (Germany) Hendrik Dreekmann (quarterfinals)
4. (Zimbabwe) Byron Black (semifinals)
5. (Netherlands) Sjeng Schalken (quarterfinals)
6. (Australia) Patrick Rafter (first round)
7. (United States) Vince Spadea (second round)
8. (Denmark) Kenneth Carlsen (first round)

== Draw ==
Key

- Q = Qualifier
- WC = Wild card
- LL = Lucky loser
- Alt = Alternate
- ITF = ITF entry
- PR = Protected ranking
- SR = Special ranking
- SE = Special exempt
- JE = Junior exempt
- JR = Junior Accelerator Programme entrant
- CO = College Accelerator Programme entrant
- NG = Next Gen Accelerator Program entrant
- w/o = Walkover
- r = Retired
- d = Defaulted

=== Finals ===
Semifinals
(Czech Republic) Martin Damm	7^{7}	3	6
(Sweden) Thomas Johansson	6^{5}	6	3
4	(Zimbabwe) Byron Black	2	2
(United Kingdom) Greg Rusedski	6	6

Final
(Czech Republic) Martin Damm	6^{5}	4
(United Kingdom) Greg Rusedski	7^{7}	6

=== Top half ===
First round
1	(United States) M Chang	6	6
(Venezuela) N Pereira	1	4
(Czech Republic) M Damm	6	6
WC	(Sweden) M Wilander	4	3
WC	(India) L Paes	4	2
(Australia) S Draper	6	6
Q	(United States) B MacPhie	4	6	7^{7}
8	(Denmark) K Carlsen	6	4	6^{2}
3	(Germany) H Dreekmann	7^{7}	4	7^{7}
(United States) J Stark	6^{5}	6	6^{0}
(Canada) S Lareau	6	7
(South Africa) G Stafford	2	5
(Argentina) J Frana	3	5
(Sweden) T Johansson	6	7
(Uzbekistan) O Ogorodov	7	7
6	(Australia) P Rafter	5	5

Second round
1	(United States) M Chang	3	4
(Czech Republic) M Damm	6	6
(Australia) S Draper	7^{9}	6
Q	(United States) B MacPhie	6^{7}	3
3	(Germany) H Dreekmann	6	6
(Canada) S Lareau	4	2
(Sweden) T Johansson	6	6
(Uzbekistan) O Ogorodov	4	3

Quarterfinals
(Czech Republic) M Damm	6	6^{4}	6
(Australia) S Draper	4	7^{7}	3
3	(Germany) H Dreekmann	6	3	1
(Sweden) T Johansson	2	6	6

Semifinals
(Czech Republic) M Damm	7^{7}	3	6
(Sweden) T Johansson	6^{5}	6	3

=== Bottom half ===
First round
5	(Netherlands) S Schalken	6	7
WC	(China) J Xia	2	5
Q	(Germany) P Kühnen	5	6	6
(South Africa) N Godwin	7	3	3
Q	(Argentina) G Cañas	4	7^{7}	4
(Netherlands) D van Scheppingen	6	6^{2}	6
(United States) M Joyce	6^{9}	6	6^{3}
4	(Zimbabwe) B Black	7^{11}	4	7^{7}
7	(United States) V Spadea	6	6
Q	(Australia) J Eagle	2	2
(Brazil) G Kuerten	5	7^{7}	6
(Sweden) P Fredriksson	7	6^{4}	4
(United Kingdom) G Rusedski	6	6
(Russia) A Olhovskiy	3	0
(France) J-P Fleurian	6	6
2	(Australia) T Woodbridge	2	3

Second round
6	(Netherlands) S Schalken	6	7^{7}
Q	(Germany) P Kühnen	4	6^{4}
(Netherlands) D van Scheppingen	1	3
4	(Zimbabwe) B Black	6	6
7	(United States) V Spadea	6	6^{1}	4
(Brazil) G Kuerten	1	7^{7}	6
(United Kingdom) G Rusedski	6^{4}	7^{7}	6
(France) J-P Fleurian	7^{7}	6^{3}	1

Quarterfinals
6	(Netherlands) S Schalken	6^{3}	4
4	(Zimbabwe) B Black	7^{7}	6
(Brazil) G Kuerten	3	4
(United Kingdom) G Rusedski	6	6

Semifinals
4	(Zimbabwe) B Black	2	2
(United Kingdom) G Rusedski	6	6
