= 1995 Nokia Open – Men's singles =

Men's singles
- 1995 Nokia Open

Final
- Champion: (United States) Michael Chang
- Runner-up: (Italy) Renzo Furlan
- Score: 7–5, 6–3

Details
- Draw: 32
- Seeds: 8

Events
Singles	men	women
Doubles	men	women
- Nokia Open

Two-time defending champion Michael Chang defeated Renzo Furlan in the final, 7–5, 6–3 to win the men's singles tennis title at the 1995 China Open.

== Seeds ==
1. (United States) Michael Chang (champion)
2. (Italy) Renzo Furlan (final)
3. (Denmark) Kenneth Carlsen (second round)
4. (Japan) Shuzo Matsuoka (semifinals)
5. (United States) Michael Joyce (first round)
6. (Australia) Scott Draper (quarterfinals)
7. (Australia) Michael Tebbutt (quarterfinals)
8. (United States) Tommy Ho (second round)

== Draw ==
Key

- Q = Qualifier
- WC = Wild card
- LL = Lucky loser
- Alt = Alternate
- ITF = ITF entry
- PR = Protected ranking
- SR = Special ranking
- SE = Special exempt
- JE = Junior exempt
- JR = Junior Accelerator Programme entrant
- CO = College Accelerator Programme entrant
- NG = Next Gen Accelerator Program entrant
- w/o = Walkover
- r = Retired
- d = Defaulted

=== Finals ===
Semifinals
1	(United States) Michael Chang	6	6
(South Africa) David Nainkin	1	2
4	(Japan) Shuzo Matsuoka	6	3	4
2	(Italy) Renzo Furlan	3	6	6

Final
1	(United States) Michael Chang	7	6
2	(Italy) Renzo Furlan	5	3

=== Top half ===
First round
1	(United States) M Chang	6	6
(Poland) W Kowalski	3	4
(United Kingdom) J Bates	6	6
(Canada) A Chang	2	4
(Belgium) D Norman	6	6
WC	(China) J Xia	3	3
(Kenya) P Wekesa	3	2
7	(Australia) M Tebbutt	6	6
3	(Denmark) K Carlsen	6	7^{7}
(Italy) C Caratti	4	6^{5}
(India) L Paes	6^{7}	7^{7}	6
Q	(Australia) J Eagle	7^{9}	6^{2}	1
WC	(United States) C Chang	3	4
(United Kingdom) M Petchey	6	6
(South Africa) D Nainkin	6	5	6
5	(United States) M Joyce	3	7	1

Second round
1	(United States) M Chang	6	6
(United Kingdom) J Bates	3	2
(Belgium) D Norman	7^{7}	2	6^{2}
7	(Australia) M Tebbutt	6^{0}	6	7^{7}
3	(Denmark) K Carlsen	3	2
(India) L Paes	6	6
(United Kingdom) M Petchey	6^{7}	5
(South Africa) D Nainkin	7^{9}	7

Quarterfinals
1	(United States) M Chang	7^{7}	6
7	(Australia) M Tebbutt	6^{5}	2
(India) L Paes	7^{9}	4	5
(South Africa) D Nainkin	6^{7}	6	7

Semifinals
1	(United States) M Chang	6	6
(South Africa) D Nainkin	1	2

=== Bottom half ===
First round
6	(Australia) S Draper	6	6
(Australia) P Kilderry	3	4
Q	(United Kingdom) A Richardson	6^{5}	0
(Germany) H Dreekmann	7^{7}	6
(Canada) S Lareau	6	6
(Israel) E Ran	2	3
(Germany) L Rehmann	4	0
4	(Japan) S Matsuoka	6	6
8	(United States) T Ho	6	6^{8}	6
WC	(China) B Pan	1	7^{10}	2
(Italy) G Pozzi	7	6
Q	(United States) K Jones	5	3
(United Kingdom) T Henman	3	6	6
Q	(United Kingdom) D Sapsford	6	4	4
(United States) B Shelton	6	4	5
2	(Italy) R Furlan	3	6	7

Second round
6	(Australia) S Draper	4	6	6
(Germany) H Dreekmann	6	3	4
(Canada) S Lareau	3	6^{7}
4	(Japan) S Matsuoka	6	7^{9}
8	(United States) T Ho	5	2
(Italy) G Pozzi	7	6
(United Kingdom) T Henman	7	3	3
2	(Italy) R Furlan	5	6	6

Quarterfinals
6	(Australia) S Draper	5	3
4	(Japan) S Matsuoka	7	6
(Italy) G Pozzi	6	3	4
2	(Italy) R Furlan	4	6	6

Semifinals
4	(Japan) S Matsuoka	6	3	4
2	(Italy) R Furlan	3	6	6
