= Yoriko Yamagishi =

Japanese tennis player (born 1972)

- Country (sports): Japan
- Born: 11 March 1972 (age 53)
- Prize money: $40,902

Singles
- Career titles: 0
- Highest ranking: No. 352 (10 November 1997)

Doubles
- Career titles: 8 ITF
- Highest ranking: No. 159 (3 November 1997)

Yoriko Yamagishi (born 11 March 1972) is a Japanese former professional tennis player.

Yamagishi was most successful in doubles, with a best world ranking of 159 and eight ITF title wins. She was a doubles semifinalist at the WTA Tour tournament in Surabaya in 1997.

== ITF finals ==
$25,000 tournaments
$10,000 tournaments

=== Doubles: 13 (8–5) ===
Result	No.	Date	Tournament	Surface	Partner	Opponents	Score
Win	1.	22 June 1992	Leiria, Portugal	Hard	(Japan) Emiko Sakaguchi	(Netherlands) Nancy van Erp (Japan) Hiroko Mochizuki	6–2, 7–5
Loss	1.	14 February 1994	Faro, Portugal	Hard	(Japan) Keiko Ishida	(Bulgaria) Antoaneta Pandjerova (Bulgaria) Teodora Nedeva	1–6, 3–6
Win	2.	3 October 1994	Ibaraki, Japan	Hard	(South Korea) Kim Il-soon	(Japan) Shinobu Asagoe (Japan) Haruka Inoue	6–2, 6–1
Loss	2.	24 July 1995	Istanbul 2, Turkey	Hard	(Czech Republic) Ludmila Varmužová	(Italy) Emanuela Brusati (Italy) Maria Paola Zavagli	6–7^{(5)}, 3–6
Win	3.	11 March 1996	Taipei, Taiwan	Hard	(Japan) Kazue Takuma	(Chinese Taipei) Hsu Hsueh-li (Chinese Taipei) Weng Tzu-ting	7–5, 6–7^{(5)}, 7–6^{(4)}
Win	4.	24 June 1996	Orbetello, Italy	Clay	(Japan) Tomoe Hotta	(Italy) Cristina Salvi (Romania) Andreea Ehritt-Vanc	3–6, 7–5, 6–2
Win	5.	4 November 1996	Manila, Philippines	Hard	(Japan) Ayami Takase	(South Korea) Won Kyung-joo (Malaysia) Khoo Chin-bee	6–3, 6–4
Win	6.	6 April 1997	Bandung 1, Indonesia	Hard	(Japan) Tomoe Hotta	(Indonesia) Wynne Prakusya (Indonesia) Eny Sulistyowati	2–6, 7–6, 7–5
Win	7.	23 June 1997	Milan, Italy	Grass	(Japan) Tomoe Hotta	(Russia) Anna Linkova (Russia) Maria Goloviznina	6–3, 5–7, 6–4
Loss	3.	21 July 1997	Jakarta, Indonesia	Clay	(Japan) Tomoe Hotta	(Chinese Taipei) Hsu Hsueh-li (Chinese Taipei) Wang Shi-ting	4–6, 4–6
Loss	4.	28 July 1997	Bandung 2, Indonesia	Hard	(Japan) Tomoe Hotta	(Japan) Keiko Ishida (Thailand) Benjamas Sangaram	2–6, 6–3, 4–6
Loss	5.	23 February 1998	Mumbai, India	Hard	(Japan) Nami Urabe	(China) Chen Jingjing (China) Yang Qin	6–7^{(5)}, 2–6
Win	8.	30 November 1998	Mallorca, Spain	Clay	(Portugal) Ana Catarina Nogueira	(Slovakia) Silvia Sosnarová (Germany) Marie Vrba	6–4, 3–6, 6–1
