= Kazue Takuma =

Japanese tennis player (born 1974)

- Country (sports): Japan
- Born: 4 August 1974 (age 51)
- Prize money: $47,563

Singles
- Highest ranking: No. 233 (5 August 1996)

Grand Slam singles results
- Australian Open: Q1 (1997)

Doubles
- Career titles: 1 ITF
- Highest ranking: No. 151 (7 July 1997)

Kazue Takuma (born 4 August 1974) is a Japanese former professional tennis player.

Takuma, who had a career high singles ranking of 233, made her WTA Tour main draw debut at Nagoya in 1995 and also twice qualified for the main draw of the Japan Open. As a doubles player she had her best year in 1996 when she won a $25,000 ITF title in Taipei and was runner-up in a WTA Tour tournament, the China Open. She featured in the singles qualifying draw for the 1997 Australian Open.

== WTA Tour finals ==
=== Doubles (0-1) ===
Result	Date	Tournament	Tier	Surface	Partner	Opponents	Score
Loss	Oct 1996	Beijing, China	Tier IV	Hard	(Japan) Yuko Hosoki	(Japan) Naoko Kijimuta (Japan) Miho Saeki	5–7, 4–6

== ITF finals ==
$25,000 tournaments
$10,000 tournaments

=== Singles: 2 (0–2) ===
Result	No.	Date	Tournament	Surface	Opponent	Score
Loss	1.	31 October 1993	Kyoto, Japan	Hard	(Australia) Lisa McShea	3–6, 2–6
Loss	2.	28 October 1996	Saga, Japan	Grass	(Thailand) Tamarine Tanasugarn	4–6, 1–6

=== Doubles: 2 (1–1) ===
Result	No.	Date	Tournament	Surface	Partner	Opponents	Score
Loss	1.	7 June 1993	Seoul, South Korea	Hard	(Japan) Yuka Yoshida	(Indonesia) Mimma Chernovita (Indonesia) Irawati Moerid	5–7, 6–2, 3–6
Win	1.	11 March 1996	Taipei, Taiwan	Hard	(Japan) Yoriko Yamagishi	(Chinese Taipei) Hsu Hsueh-li (Chinese Taipei) Weng Tzu-ting	7–5, 6–7^{(5)}, 7–6^{(4)}
