= Hsu Hsueh-li =

Taiwanese tennis player (born 1977)

- Country (sports): Chinese Taipei
- Born: 8 April 1977 (age 48)
- Prize money: $9,540

Singles
- Career record: 30–37
- Career titles: 0
- Highest ranking: No. 547 (15 December 1997)

Doubles
- Career record: 28–28
- Career titles: 2 ITF
- Highest ranking: No. 343 (30 March 1998)
Medal record
Representing Chinese Taipei
Women's Tennis
Asian Games
Gold medal – first place	1998 Bangkok	Women's Team
Universiade
Gold medal – first place	1997 Sicily	Women's Doubles

Hsu Hsueh-li (Chinese: 徐雪麗; born 8 April 1977) is a Taiwanese former professional tennis player.

From 1996 to 1999, Hsu played in a total of 14 Fed Cup ties for Chinese Taipei, securing three singles and five doubles wins (overall 8–9). Her appearances included three World Group II play-off ties in 1999, against Romania, Australia and Argentina.

Hsu was a member of Chinese Taipei's gold medal winning team at the 1998 Asian Games in Bangkok.

== ITF Circuit finals ==
$25,000 tournaments
$10,000 tournaments

=== Doubles: 4 (2 titles, 2 runner-ups) ===
Outcome	No.	Date	Tournament	Surface	Partner	Opponents	Score
Runner-up	1.	11 March 1996	ITF Taipei, Taiwan	Hard	(Chinese Taipei) Weng Tzu-ting	(Japan) Kazue Takuma (Japan) Yoriko Yamagishi	5–7, 7–6^{(5)}, 6–7^{(4)}
Winner	1.	21 July 1997	ITF Jakarta, Indonesia	Clay	(Chinese Taipei) Wang Shi-ting	(Japan) Tomoe Hotta (Japan) Yoriko Yamagishi	6–4, 6–4
Winner	2.	14 September 1998	ITF Ibaraki, Japan	Hard	(Japan) Yuko Hosoki	(Japan) Riei Kawamata (Japan) Yoshiko Sasano	6–4, 4–6, 7–5
Runner-up	2.	22 November 1998	ITF Manila, Philippines	Hard	(Chinese Taipei) Chen Yu-an	(Indonesia) Irawati Iskandar (Indonesia) Liza Andriyani	6–2, 3–6, 3–6
