= Irawati Iskandar =

Indonesian tennis player (born 1969)

Irawati Moerid
- Country (sports): Indonesia
- Born: 31 October 1969 (age 56)
- Turned pro: 1986
- Retired: 2000
- Prize money: $28,324

Singles
- Career record: 82–60
- Career titles: 1 ITF
- Highest ranking: No. 328 (13 April 1992)

Doubles
- Career record: 100–49
- Career titles: 8 ITF
- Highest ranking: No. 274 (4 May 1992)

Medal record

Women's tennis

Representing Indonesia

Asian Games
Silver medal – second place	1990 Beijing	Women's Teams
Bronze medal – third place	1990 Beijing	Women's Doubles
Bronze medal – third place	1998 Bangkok	Women's Teams

Irawati Iskandar (born Irawati Moerid; 31 October 1969) is a former Indonesian tennis player.

She made her debut as a professional in August 1989, aged 19, at the Indonesia Open in Jakarta.

Together with partner Lukky Tedjamukti, she won the bronze medal in women's doubles at the 1990 Asian Games in Beijing.

She was part of Indonesia Fed Cup team in 1990, 1999 and 2000.

== ITF finals ==
Legend
$50,000 tournaments
$25,000 tournaments
$10,000 tournaments

=== Singles (1–4) ===
Result	No.	Date	Location	Surface	Opponent	Score
Loss	1.	18 June 1990	Semarang, Indonesia	Clay	(Indonesia) Joice-Riana Sutedja	6–4, 4–6, 1–6
Win	2.	17 February 1992	Bandung, Indonesia	Hard	(China) Chen Li	5–7, 6–4, 6–3
Loss	3.	9 May 1994	Bandar Seri, Brunei	Hard	(Japan) Ayako Hirose	4–6, 1–6
Loss	4.	27 July 1997	Jakarta, Indonesia	Hard	(Indonesia) Wukirasih Sawondari	0–6, 3–6
Loss	5.	18 October 1999	Jakarta, Indonesia	Hard	(Thailand) Suchanun Viratprasert	4–6, 1–6

=== Doubles (8–9) ===
Result	No.	Date	Location	Surface	Partner	Opponents	Score
Loss	1.	28 May 1990	Francaville, Italy	Clay	(Indonesia) Tanti Trayono	(Italy) Lorenza Jachia (Czechoslovakia) Zuzana Witzová	3–6, 6–3, 5–7
Loss	2.	18 June 1990	Semarang, Indonesia	Clay	(Indonesia) Tanti Trayono	(Netherlands) Colette Sely (Indonesia) Lukky Tedjamukti	4–6, 6–4, 6–7^{(3–7)}
Loss	3.	12 August 1990	Jakarta, Indonesia	Hard	(Indonesia) Justi Kuswara	(Indonesia) Yayuk Basuki (Indonesia) Suzanna Wibowo	5–7, 3–6
Loss	4.	6 May 1991	Manila, Philippines	Hard	(Indonesia) Lukky Tedjamukti	(China) Li Fang (China) Tang Min	6–7, 7–6, 6–7
Win	5.	9 September 1991	Bangkok, Thailand	Hard	(Indonesia) Lukky Tedjamukti	(China) Li Fang (China) Tang Min	4–6, 7–5, 6–4
Loss	6.	29 March 1993	Bangkok, Thailand	Hard	(Indonesia) Mimma Chernovita	(Australia) Nicole Pratt (Indonesia) Suzanna Wibowo	w/o
Win	7.	7 June 1993	Seoul, South Korea	Hard	(Indonesia) Mimma Chernovita	(Japan) Kazue Takuma (Japan) Yuka Yoshida	7–5, 2–6, 6–3
Loss	8.	9 May 1994	Bandar Seri, Brunei	Hard	(Thailand) Benjamas Sangaram	(Japan) Anori Fukuda (Japan) Keiko Nagatomi	6–7, 3–6
Win	9.	22 November 1998	Manila, Philippines	Hard	(Indonesia) Liza Andriyani	(Chinese Taipei) Chen Yu-an (Chinese Taipei) Hsu Hsueh-li	2–6, 6–3, 6–3
Loss	10.	29 November 1998	Manila, Philippines	Hard	(Indonesia) Liza Andriyani	(South Korea) Chang Kyung-mi (South Korea) Kim Jin-hee	3–6, 6–7
Win	11.	18 April 1999	Jakarta, Indonesia	Hard	(Indonesia) Liza Andriyani	(South Korea) Chang Kyung-mi (Indonesia) Wukirasih Sawondari	6–4, 6–4
Win	12.	25 April 1999	Jakarta, Indonesia	Hard	(Indonesia) Wynne Prakusya	(Switzerland) Dianne Asensio (Netherlands) Jolanda Mens	6–1, 6–3
Loss	13.	13 June 1999	Shenzhen, China	Hard	(Indonesia) Liza Andriyani	(China) Li Na (China) Li Ting	1–6, 3–6
Win	14.	17 October 1999	Jakarta, Indonesia	Hard	(Indonesia) Wukirasih Sawondari	(Indonesia) Mudarwati Mudarwatı (Indonesia) Dea Sumantri	7–5, 6–3
Win	15.	20 February 2000	Jakarta, Indonesia	Hard	(Indonesia) Yayuk Basuki	(South Korea) Choi Young-ja (South Korea) Kim Eun-sook	7–5, 7–5
Loss	16.	27 February 2000	Jakarta, Indonesia	Hard	(Indonesia) Wukirasih Sawondari	(Indonesia) Yayuk Basuki (Indonesia) Wynne Prakusya	4–6, 2–6
Win	17.	16 July 2000	Jakarta, Indonesia	Hard	(Indonesia) Wukirasih Sawondari	(South Korea) Chae Kyung-yee (South Korea) Jeon Mi-ra	w/o
