= Amélie Mauresmo =

French former tennis player (born 1979)

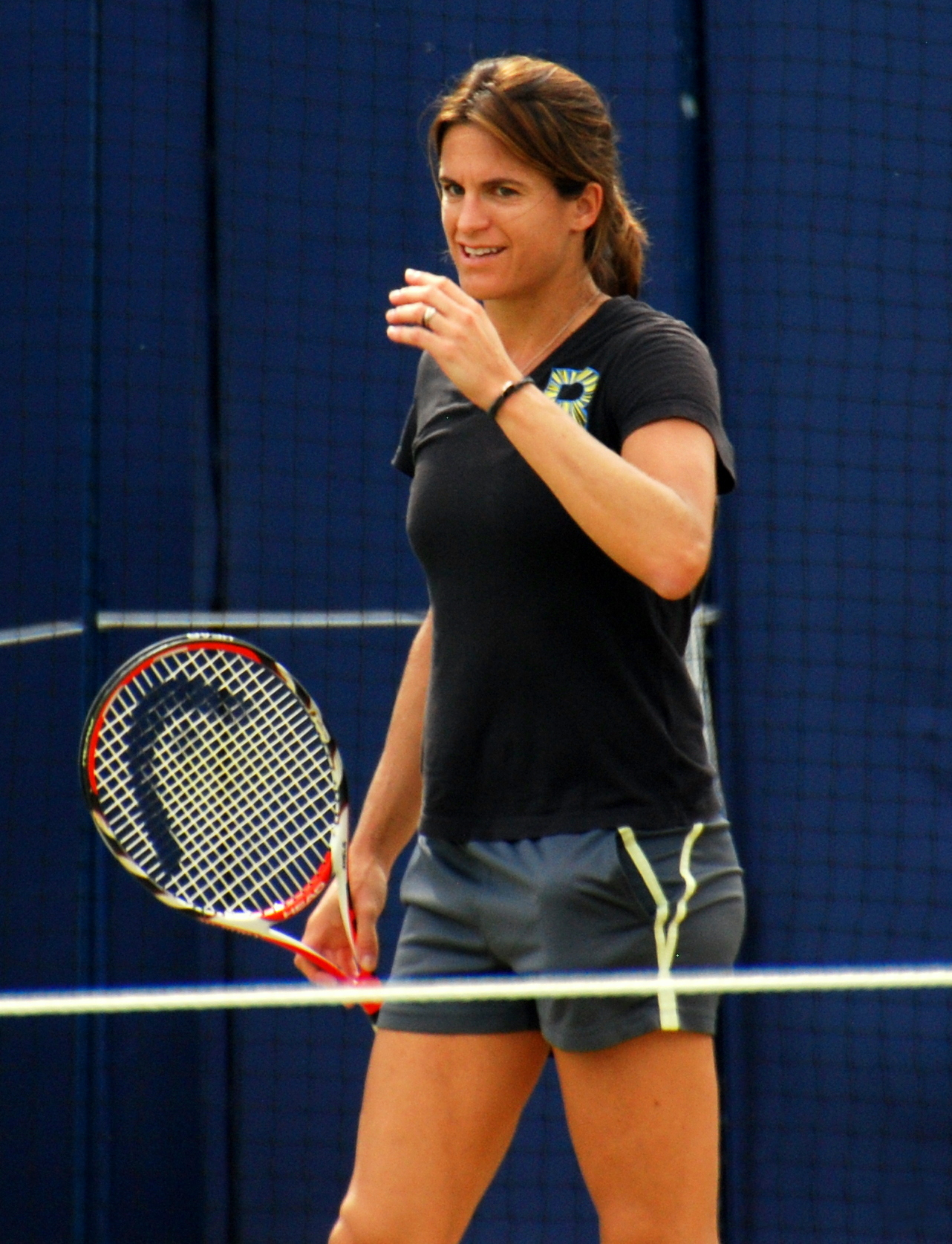
- Mauresmo in June 2014
- Full name: Amélie Simone Mauresmo
- Country (sports): France
- Born: 5 July 1979 (age 47) Saint-Germain-en-Laye, France
- Height: 1.75 m (5 ft 9 in)
- Turned pro: 1993
- Retired: 3 December 2009
- Plays: Right-handed (one-handed backhand)
- Coach: Loïc Courteau (2002–2008); Hugo Lecoq (2008–2009)
- Prize money: US$15,022,476: 40th in all-time rankings
- Int. Tennis HoF: 2015 (member page)

Singles
- Career record: 545–227 (70.6%)
- Career titles: 25
- Highest ranking: No. 1 (13 September 2004)

Grand Slam singles results
- Australian Open: W (2006)
- French Open: QF (2003, 2004)
- Wimbledon: W (2006)
- US Open: SF (2002, 2006)

Other tournaments
- Grand Slam Cup: QF (1999)
- Tour Finals: W (2005)

Doubles
- Career record: 92–62
- Career titles: 3
- Highest ranking: No. 29 (26 June 2006)

Grand Slam doubles results
- Australian Open: QF (1999)
- French Open: 2R (1997, 1998)
- Wimbledon: F (2005)
- US Open: 3R (1999)

Team competitions
- Fed Cup: W (2003)

Coaching career (2013–)
- Michaël Llodra (2010) (coach-consultant); Victoria Azarenka (2012) (coach-consultant); Marion Bartoli (2013); Andy Murray (2014–2016); Lucas Pouille (2019–2020)

Coaching achievements
- Coachee singles titles total: 8
- List of notable tournaments (with champion) Wimbledon (Bartoli); 2x ATP World Tour Masters 1000 (Murray)
Medal record
Women's tennis
Representing France
Silver medal – second place	2004 Athens	Singles

Amélie Simone Mauresmo (French pronunciation: [ameli simɔn moʁɛsmo]; born 5 July 1979) is a French former professional tennis player, tennis coach, and tournament director. She was ranked as the world No. 1 in women's singles by the Women's Tennis Association (WTA) for 39 weeks. Mauresmo won 25 WTA Tour-level singles titles, including two majors, at the 2006 Australian Open and the 2006 Wimbledon Championships, as well as the 2005 WTA Tour Championships. She also won an Olympic silver medal in singles at the 2004 Athens Olympics. Mauresmo was known for her powerful one-handed backhand and strong net play.

Mauresmo officially announced her retirement from professional tennis on 3 December 2009, ending a career of 15 years. The following year, she started her coaching career, covering both WTA and ATP players, including ATP world No. 1 Andy Murray. She was inducted into the International Tennis Hall of Fame in 2015. In 2021, Mauresmo was named the director of the French Open.

== Early life ==
Mauresmo was born in Saint-Germain-en-Laye, slightly northwest of Paris. She began playing tennis at the age of four, after being inspired by Yannick Noah's win in the 1983 French Open on television. It was after his win that Mauresmo's parents bought her her first tennis racket. In 1998 Noah picked her on the French team for the Fed Cup. Her mother Françoise is a housewife and her father Francis, who died in March 2004, was an engineer. She has a brother, Fabien, who is an engineer.

In 1996, Mauresmo won both the junior French Open and Wimbledon singles titles. She was later named 1996 Junior World Champion by the International Tennis Federation.

== Playing career ==
The unseeded Mauresmo reached the Australian Open final in 1999 with wins over three seeded players, including world No. 1, Lindsay Davenport, before falling to world No. 2, Martina Hingis. Mauresmo was only the second Frenchwoman ever to reach the Australian Open final; (Mary Pierce was the first, winning the championship in 1995). She was only the third Frenchwoman to reach any Grand Slam final during the Open Era.

Mauresmo defeated Hingis later in the year, en route to the final of the Paris indoor event.

=== 2004: Olympic silver, world No. 1 ===
Mauresmo reached the semifinals at Wimbledon, where she lost to Serena Williams in three sets after winning the first set and up a break in the second set. She reached the quarterfinals of the three other Grand Slam tournaments and won three Tier I titles in Rome, Berlin, and Montreal.

Mauresmo won a silver medal in singles at the Olympic Games in Athens, where she was defeated by Justine Henin in the final.

On 13 September 2004, Mauresmo became the first French tennis player to become world No. 1 since the computer rankings began in the 1970s. She held that ranking for five weeks and was the second woman, after Kim Clijsters, to have attained the top spot without having won a Grand Slam title.

=== 2005: WTA Tour Championships crown ===
Mauresmo reached the quarterfinals of the Australian Open, but was defeated there by eventual champion Serena Williams.

At the French Open, seeded third, Mauresmo was upset in the third round by the then little-known 17-year-old Ana Ivanovic, in three sets. Mauresmo had, at the Australian Open earlier in the year, become the first player to defeat the Serb in the main draw of a Grand Slam tournament, winning in straight sets also in the third round.

At the US Open, Mauresmo lost in the quarterfinals to Mary Pierce, in straight sets. That followed a semifinal loss to Lindsay Davenport at Wimbledon.

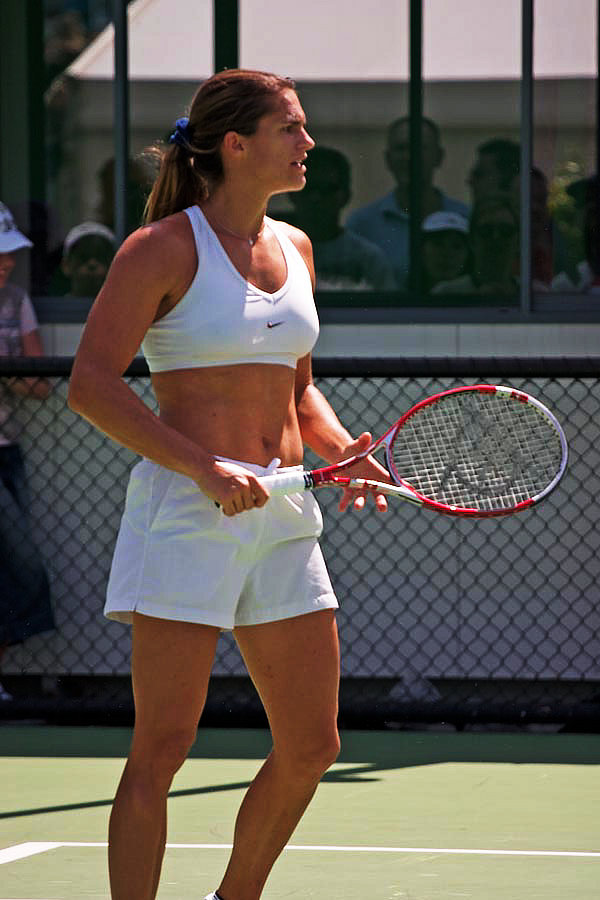
Mauresmo at the 2005 Australian Open

Mauresmo claimed her first singles title at the WTA Tour Championships. She defeated Pierce in the final after losing to Pierce in a round-robin match at that tournament, in three sets.

=== 2006: Two Grand Slam titles, back to No. 1 ===
At the Australian Open, Mauresmo captured her first Grand Slam singles title, defeating Belgian former world No. 1 players, Kim Clijsters and Justine Henin, en route. Both opponents retired from their respective matches, Clijsters with a right ankle sprain in the third set of their semifinal and Henin from gastroenteritis in the final. Mauresmo was leading in both matches at the time of the retirements, by 6–1, 2–0 against Henin.

Mauresmo then won her next two tournaments, the Open Gaz de France tournament in Paris (defeating Mary Pierce in the final) and the Proximus Diamond Games in Antwerp, Belgium (defeating Clijsters in the final).

At the Qatar Open in Doha, Mauresmo defeated Martina Hingis in a semifinal, 6–2, 6–2, but lost to Nadia Petrova in the final. Had she won the final, she would have immediately regained the world No. 1 ranking from Clijsters. Nonetheless, the outcome was sufficient to ensure Mauresmo's return to the world number-one ranking on 20 March 2006.

Mauresmo then reached the semifinals of the Miami Open in Key Biscayne, Florida, where she lost to the eventual champion Svetlana Kuznetsova.

Mauresmo lost in the fourth round of the French Open to Czech teenager Nicole Vaidišová, 6–7, 6–1, 6–2. Mauresmo next suffered a first-round loss at the Wimbledon warm-up tournament in Eastbourne. However, Mauresmo and Kuznetsova won the doubles title there, their first as a team and Mauresmo's second overall.

Mauresmo was the top seed at Wimbledon. She defeated Anastasia Myskina in a quarterfinal and Maria Sharapova in a semifinal, and then came back from one set down to defeat Henin in the final 2–6, 6–3, 6–4. The victory was Mauresmo's second Grand Slam singles title and the first on grass. She was also the first Frenchwoman since Suzanne Lenglen to win Wimbledon. She remains the most recent woman to win Wimbledon with a single-handed backhand. The Wimbledon final was notable because it was the first and only time in the decade that neither Williams sister qualified for the final.

She then pulled out of the Fed Cup World Group I playoff tie against the Czech Republic due to a groin injury sustained during Wimbledon. She also withdrew from the Rogers Cup in Montreal.

Her next tournament was the Pilot Pen Tennis tournament in New Haven, Connecticut, where she lost in the quarterfinals to Lindsay Davenport, 4–6, 5–7.

At the US Open, Mauresmo lost to Sharapova in the semifinals 0–6, 6–4, 0–6. This was the first time in the open era that a female had lost two sets at love in a US Open semifinal.

Mauresmo then reached the final of the China Open, losing to Kuznetsova. During the tournament, Mauresmo won 137 ranking points to help preserve her world no. 1 ranking and ended a nine-match losing streak to Davenport stretching back to January 2000 in Sydney.

To conclude the year, Mauresmo reached the final of the WTA Tour Championships in Madrid, losing to Henin, 4–6, 3–6. Mauresmo finished the year ranked world No. 3, behind Henin and Sharapova.

=== 2007: Out of the top 5 ===
Mauresmo started the year in Australia with a quarterfinal loss to Jelena Janković at the Sydney International. At the Australian Open, Mauresmo lost in the fourth round to Lucie Šafářová, 4–6, 3–6, after winning her first three matches in straight sets.

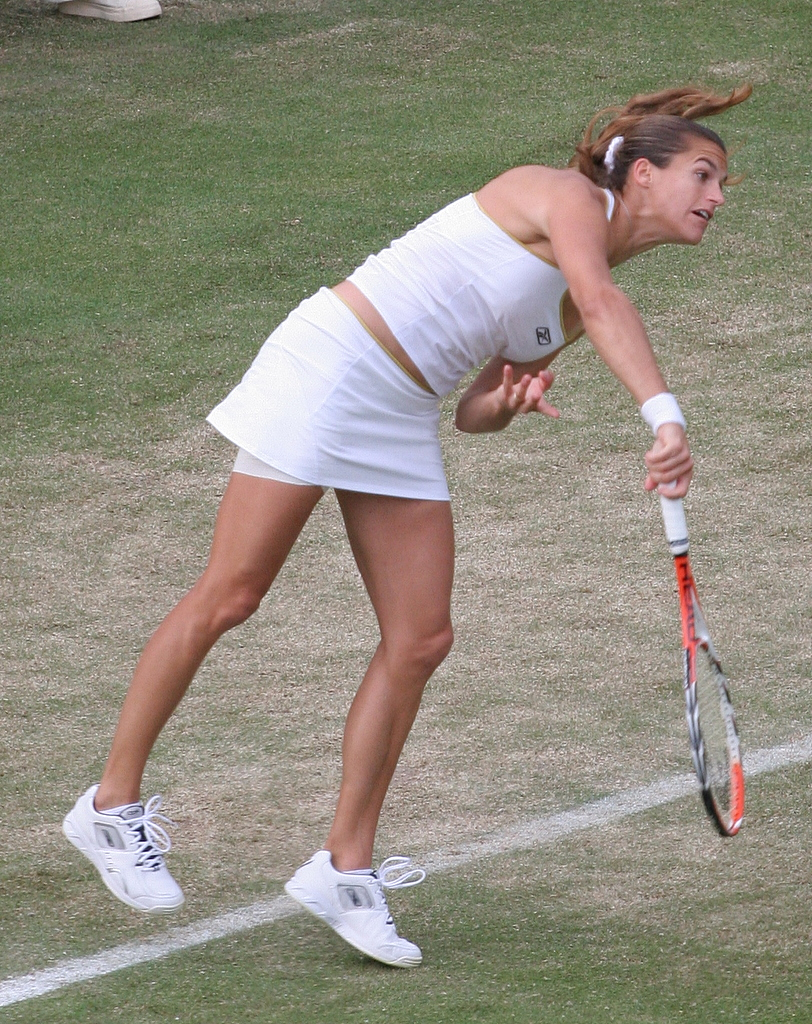
Mauresmo at Wimbledon 2007

Mauresmo's next tournament was the Open Gaz de France, where she lost in the semifinals to Nadia Petrova, 7–5, 4–6, 6–7, after Mauresmo led 4–1 in the final set and had a match point in the tiebreak. This was Mauresmo's third loss in the last four matches with Petrova. In her next tournament at the Proximus Diamond Games in Antwerp, Mauresmo defeated Kim Clijsters in the final. This was Mauresmo's third consecutive title there, earning her the diamond-encrusted racquet that comes with winning the title at least three times in five years. The trophy cost US$1.3 million. Mauresmo then played the Dubai Open, where she lost to Justine Henin in the final.

On 16 March 2007, Mauresmo received the Chevalier of the Légion d'honneur from President Jacques Chirac.

Mauresmo was scheduled to play the Miami Open but was forced to withdraw because of acute appendicitis. She also withdrew from the Bausch & Lomb Championships in Amelia Island, Florida, for the same reason. Although she had resumed training, she was not fit enough to compete at the J & S Cup in Warsaw, Poland.

At the German Open in Berlin, Mauresmo lost in the third round to Julia Vakulenko of Ukraine, and at the Rome Masters, she lost in the second round to Samantha Stosur, 7–5, 7–6, 6–7, after Mauresmo led 5–3 in the third set. Going into the French Open, Mauresmo had played only three tournaments since the end of February. Mauresmo lost to Czech Lucie Šafářová in the third round, 3–6, 6–7, committing eight double faults and 49 unforced errors.

After losing to Henin in the final of the International Women's Open in Eastbourne, 5–7, 7–6, 6–7, after being up 4–1 in the deciding set, defending champion Mauresmo went into Wimbledon saying that she was ready to win another major title. However, she lost her fourth-round match against Czech teen Nicole Vaidišová, 6–7, 6–4, 1–6. The loss dropped her to world No. 6, her first time outside the top five since November 2003.

Mauresmo withdrew from the US Open, because of a lack of fitness.

She made her return to the tour at the China Open in Beijing. However, she lost in the quarterfinals to home-crowd favourite Peng Shuai. She then entered the Porsche Tennis Grand Prix, where she lost to Elena Dementieva in straight sets. At the Kremlin Cup in Moscow, Mauresmo lost in the first round to Vera Zvonareva. In Zürich, Mauresmo lost in the second round to Alona Bondarenko in three sets.

Mauresmo left Dunlop for HEAD racquets. The partnership was to run through 2010.

=== 2008: Shadow of the champion ===
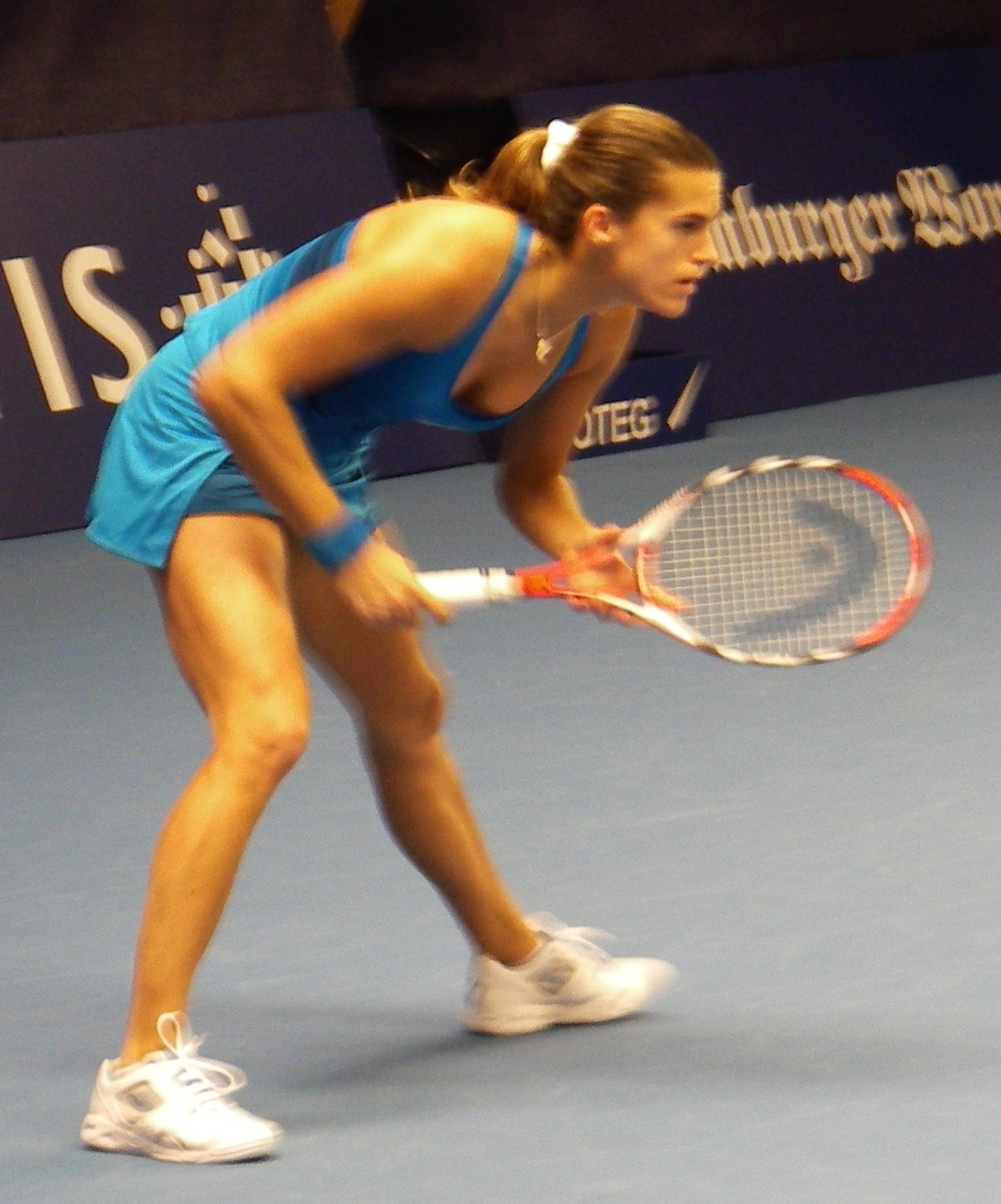
Mauresmo at Fortis Championships 2008

Her first tournament of the year was the Tier III Australian Hardcourts in Gold Coast, where she lost in the quarterfinals to fourth-seeded Patty Schnyder. At the Australian Open in Melbourne, Mauresmo lost in the third round to Casey Dellacqua, 6–3, 4–6, 4–6.

At her next tournament, the Tier II Open Gaz de France in Paris, Mauresmo lost in the quarterfinals to Anna Chakvetadze, 6–3, 3–6, 3–6.

Mauresmo played both tournaments in the Middle East. At the Tier I Qatar Open, she lost in the second round to Tamarine Tanasugarn, 6–7, 5–7. At the Tier II Dubai Tennis Championships, Mauresmo reached her third quarterfinal of the year but was unable to hold off the second seed and eventual finalist Svetlana Kuznetsova, losing 1–6, 6–7.

Mauresmo then lost in the third round of Tier-I events, the Pacific Life Open in Indian Wells and the Miami Open in Key Biscayne.

On clay at the Bausch & Lomb Championships in Amelia Island, Mauresmo lost in the quarterfinals to eventual runner-up Dominika Cibulková.

At the French Open, Mauresmo lost in the second round to Spanish qualifier Carla Suárez Navarro, 3–6, 4–6.

At the Eastbourne International, Mauresmo defeated sixth-seeded French woman Alizé Cornet in the first round, 6–1, 4–6, 7–5, but lost in the second round after retiring due to injury from her match with Sam Stosur while Mauresmo was leading 2–1.

At Wimbledon, Mauresmo lost in the third round to two-time former champion Serena Williams, 6–7, 1–6. Hampered by a thigh injury, Mauresmo trailed 5–0 in the second set before breaking Williams's serve, only to be broken herself in the next game and lose the match. Mauresmo said after the match, "I was not 100% in my movement but overall I thought there were some good moments in the first set. But I really started to feel the injury in the tiebreak, and I'm not going to talk about the second set."

Mauresmo declined the nomination by the French Tennis Federation to play in the Olympic Games after Mary Pierce withdrew. Pauline Parmentier was then nominated.

Mauresmo, after a two-month hiatus from tennis due to a thigh injury sustained at Wimbledon, lost in the semifinals of the Cincinnati Open to Nathalie Dechy, 4–6, 6–3, 2–6. After the match, Mauresmo, sounding optimistic about her chances at the upcoming US Open, said "I got four matches in this week, which is what I was looking for. It would have been great to play five but I'll go to New Haven (Connecticut) hoping to find a little more rhythm and build-up to the US Open." Mauresmo then lost in the semifinals of the Pilot Pen Tennis tournament (in New Haven) to top-seeded Chakvetadze 3–6, 6–3, 1–6. At the US Open, Mauresmo lost in the fourth round to 16th-seeded Flavia Pennetta 3–6, 0–6.

On 29 September, Mauresmo announced that she would split from her long-time coach, Loïc Courteau.

Mauresmo lost in the first round at Tokyo and Beijing, both times in long three-set defeats by Dominika Cibulková. She reached the second round in Moscow, falling to Dinara Safina, 7–6, 4–6, 4–6, and fell in the first round at Zurich to Belarusian teenager Victoria Azarenka.

She ended her year with a quarterfinal result at Luxembourg, losing to eventual champion Elena Dementieva. Mauresmo ended the year ranked world No. 24, with a singles record of 32–19.

=== 2009: Final year and retirement ===
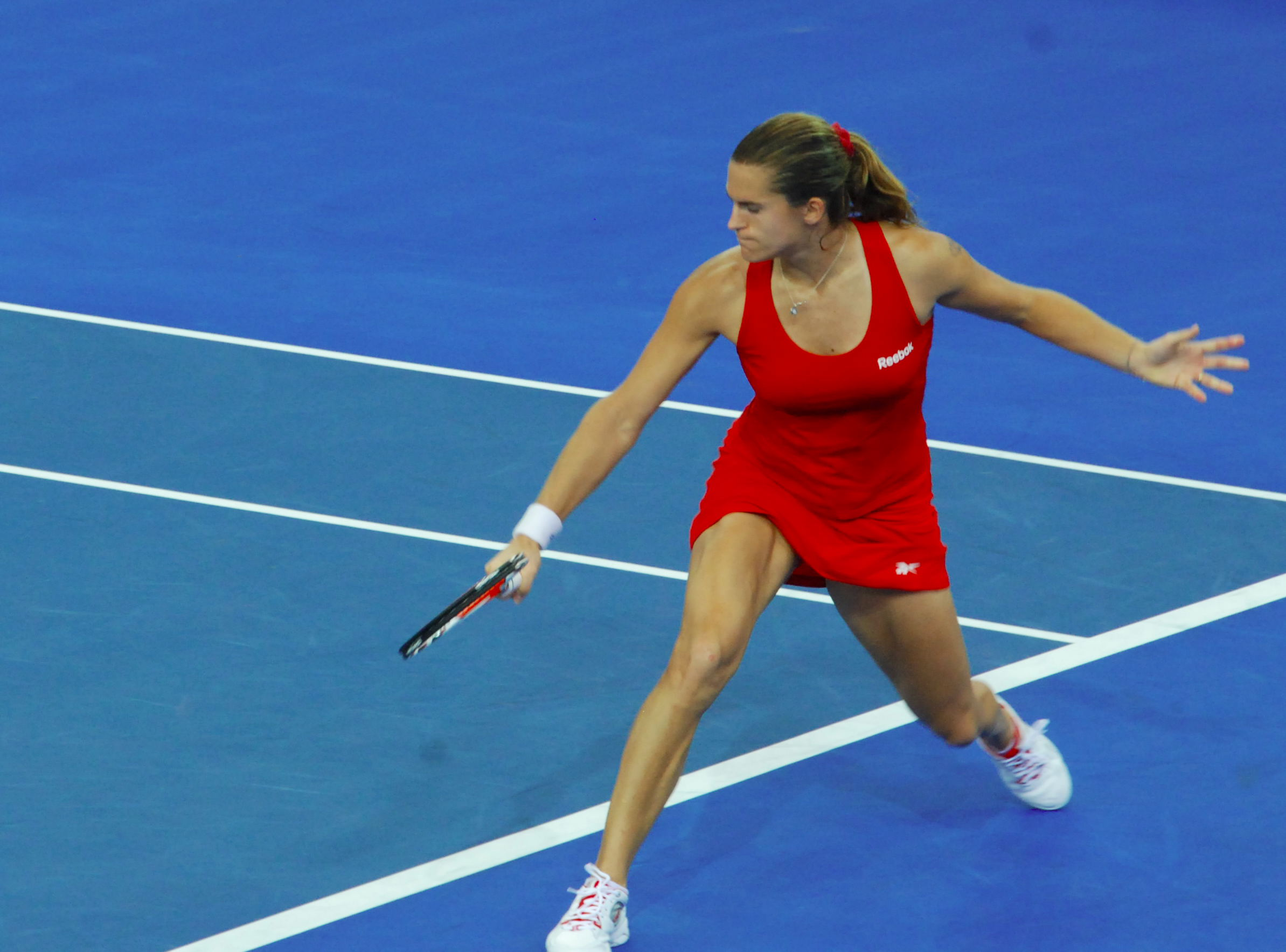
Mauresmo at the Brisbane International in 2009

At the Brisbane International tournament, Mauresmo defeated world no. 177 Jelena Dokić in the first round, 7–6, 7–6, before defeating French compatriot Julie Coin in the second round, 5–7, 6–2, 7–6 in 3 hours, 14 minutes. The fifth-seeded Mauresmo then defeated top-seeded Ana Ivanovic in the quarterfinals, before retiring in her semifinal match against third-seeded Marion Bartoli, while trailing 0–4 in the first set. At the Australian Open, Mauresmo lost in the third round to Victoria Azarenka.

Mauresmo won her first tournament since 2007 by defeating Elena Dementieva in the final of the Open Gaz de France tournament in Paris.

Mauresmo lost in the third round of the Indian Wells Open in California, the first Premier Mandatory event of the year, to Li Na, 5–7, 2–6. The next event on the WTA Tour was another Premier Mandatory tournament at Key Biscayne. Mauresmo was seeded 20th there and lost in the fourth round to unseeded Sam Stosur, 4–6, 4–6, but ended up winning the doubles event with her tennis partner Svetlana Kuznetsova, after ousting the world champions on their way to the cup.

At the Madrid Masters, Mauresmo defeated Zheng Jie in the second round, 6–2, 7–5. She then came from behind to defeat Elena Dementieva, 1–6, 6–4, 6–2, and Ágnes Szávay, 5–7, 6–1, 6–1, in the third round and quarterfinal respectively. She lost against fast-rising teenager star Caroline Wozniacki, 6–7, 3–6, in the semifinals.

Mauresmo lost against Anna-Lena Grönefeld, 4–6, 3–6, in the first round of the French Open.

Mauresmo was the 17th seed at the 2009 Wimbledon Championships. She opened with a 6–1, 4–6, 6–2 win over Melinda Czink. She then defeated Kristína Kučová and Flavia Pennetta. Her fourth-round match against the first seed Dinara Safina became a part of tennis history as it was the first competitive match in which the new, multimillion-pound roof closed due to rain. Mauresmo went on to lose the match, 6–4, 3–6, 4–6.

At the 2009 US Open, Mauresmo was the 17th seed but lost to unseeded Aleksandra Wozniak, 4–6, 0–6, in the second round.

Mauresmo announced at a press conference on 8 October 2009 that she was considering retiring from tennis. On 3 December 2009, she officially announced her retirement at a press conference in Paris. She ended her career ranked world No. 21.

== Coaching career ==
=== 2010–2011 ===
In June and July 2010, Mauresmo temporarily coached fellow French player Michaël Llodra during the grass season. On 7 November, Mauresmo ran her first marathon at the 2010 New York City Marathon, finishing 3hr: 40m: 20s.

At the 2011 French Open, Mauresmo was set to be reunited with Llodra, making her professional return in the mixed doubles competition, but was disqualified before competing, as she had not re-registered for the anti-doping procedures required to compete on the tour.

=== 2012 ===
In 2012, Mauresmo joined forces with 2012 Australian Open champion and then-world No. 1, Victoria Azarenka, and her team as a support coach to help the Belarusian in defending her world No. 1 ranking and launching an assault on the remaining three Grand Slams of 2012 and the 2012 Olympics.

=== 2013 ===
In 2013, Mauresmo started coaching French No. 1, Marion Bartoli, joining forces with her shortly before the 2013 Wimbledon Championships. Under her tutelage, Bartoli would win her first Grand Slam title there without dropping a set (or even playing a tiebreak set), and credited her for her career revival (entering these Championships, Bartoli had yet to even reach a semi-final in 2013).

=== 2014–2016 ===
On 8 June 2014, Mauresmo was announced as the new coach of Andy Murray. In December 2014, the FFT announced that it was extending Mauresmo's Fed Cup contract for another two years. Under her coaching Murray reached the 2015 Australian Open final but he lost to Novak Djokovic in four sets. In May 2015, Mauresmo oversaw Murray's first career titles on clay, including the 2015 Madrid Open, which culminated in a first-ever clay-court victory over Rafael Nadal. Murray also reached the semi-finals of the French Open and Wimbledon. Mauresmo gave birth to a son in August 2015, and was on maternity leave after Wimbledon until late in the year, with Murray coached by Jonas Björkman in Mauresmo's absence. In 2016, Mauresmo was back coaching Murray as he reached his fifth Australian Open final before losing to Djokovic in straight sets. Murray reached a semi-final at Monte Carlo where he lost to Nadal. Mauresmo's last tournament as Murray's coach was the 2016 Madrid Open, where Murray beat Nadal in the semi-final but then lost a close final to Djokovic. The next day, 9 May 2016, Mauresmo announced in Rome that she had stepped down as Murray's coach.

Simultaneously, she had captained the France Fed Cup team since 2013. After the 2016 final, which they lost to the Czech Republic, she announced she was quitting that post due to her second pregnancy.

=== 2018 ===
In June 2018, she was appointed captain of the France Davis Cup team for the following season. Nevertheless, she never came to fulfill this position, since at the end of the year she renounced in order to coach French player Lucas Pouille during the 2019 season.

=== 2019 ===
Under Mauresmo's coaching, Pouille, who had never previously won a match at the Australian Open, reached the semifinals of the 2019 edition, where he lost to eventual champion Novak Djokovic. Mauresmo and Pouille parted ways in October 2020, largely influenced by the changes in the tennis world and beyond following the COVID-19 pandemic.

== Playing style ==
Mauresmo was an aggressive player with an all-court game, who was noted for her technical mastery. Her strongest groundstroke was her one-handed backhand, which was one of the most effective on the WTA tour. Mauresmo could hit her backhand flat and with depth, with topspin, or with slice; her backhand was responsible for most of the winners she accumulated on court. Her forehand was more erratic, and players acquainted with Mauresmo's game would hit relentlessly to her forehand to try to force an error. Throughout her career, however, Mauresmo made improvements to her forehand, and, by 2005, it became a stroke she utilised more frequently and with more success. Her serve was powerful, with her first serve averaging 107 mph (172 km/h), and being recorded as high as 116 mph (187 km/h), enabling her to serve aces regularly. A reliable second serves, typically delivered at 92 mph (148 km/h), meant that double faults were uncommon. Mauresmo was one of the strongest net players on the WTA Tour, and would frequently choose to finish points at the net. An exceptional volleyer, she had deft touch at the net and had a complete repertoire of shots to perform there. Although not a net-rusher like Martina Navratilova or Billie Jean King, Mauresmo was a proficient serve and volleyer; this tactic was especially effective on grass courts. She was an aggressive returner, standing on the baseline to receive first serves, neutralising them effectively with a backhand down-the-line or an inside-out forehand. She would stand several feet within the baseline to receive second serves and could hit return winners frequently. Despite her exceptional skill, Mauresmo's greatest weakness was her lack of confidence, nerves, and inconsistency; these were discussed at length by the media throughout her career. Mauresmo's game was effective on all surfaces, and she won tournaments on all four surfaces.

== Performance at Grand Slam tournaments ==
Although Mauresmo had been one of the top singles players for several years, she did not have success in winning Grand Slam tournaments until 2006. Mauresmo was criticized for her mental strength after succumbing to nerves in those events. In consecutive Wimbledon semifinals, she lost to Serena Williams and Lindsay Davenport after leading comfortably. Before her 2006 Australian Open title, Mauresmo was often touted as "the greatest women's player never to win a Grand Slam." After winning the 2006 Wimbledon title, Mauresmo openly joked, "I don't want anyone to talk about my nerves anymore."

Mauresmo is one of several tennis players, male or female, to have reached the top ranking without first winning a Grand Slam singles title. Other players who had done so were Kim Clijsters, Ivan Lendl, Marcelo Ríos, Jelena Janković, Dinara Safina, Caroline Wozniacki, Karolina Pliskova and Simona Halep.

== Personal life ==
In April 2015, Mauresmo announced via Twitter that she was pregnant and expecting the baby in August. On 16 August 2015, it was announced that she had given birth to a baby boy named Aaron. She gave birth to her daughter, Ayla, on 26 April 2017.

Mauresmo was one of the final torch runners at the 2024 Summer Olympics opening ceremony.

During the 1999 Australia Open, Mauresmo, 19 at the time, came out as gay to the international press. She "attributed her success on the court to coming to terms with her sexuality and finding love."

== Equipment and endorsements ==
Mauresmo's apparel and footwear on court was manufactured by Nike, and later Reebok. In the early 2000s, she used Dunlop 200G+1.00 racquet.

== Career statistics ==
=== Grand Slam singles performance timeline ===
Key
W	F	SF	QF	#R	RR	Q#	DNQ	A	NH

(W) winner; (F) finalist; (SF) semifinalist; (QF) quarterfinalist; (#R) rounds 4, 3, 2, 1; (RR) round-robin stage; (Q#) qualification round; (DNQ) did not qualify; (A) absent; (NH) not held; (SR) strike rate (events won / competed); (W–L) win–loss record.

Tournament	1995	1996	1997	1998	1999	2000	2001	2002	2003	2004	2005	2006	2007	2008	2009	SR	W–L
Grand Slam tournaments
Australian Open	A	Q2	Q2	3R	F	2R	4R	QF	A	QF^{1}	QF	W	4R	3R	3R	1 / 11	38–9
French Open	1R^{2}	2R	2R	1R	2R	4R	1R	4R	QF	QF	3R	4R	3R	2R	1R	0 / 15	25–15
Wimbledon	A	A	Q3	2R	A	1R	3R	SF	A	SF	SF	W	4R	3R	4R	1 / 10	33–9
US Open	A	A	A	3R	4R	A	QF	SF	QF	QF	QF	SF	A	4R	2R	0 / 10	35–10
Win–loss	3–1	2–2	4–3	5–4	10–3	4–3	9–4	17–4	8–2	17–3	15–4	22–2	8–3	8–4	6–4	2 / 46	131–43

- ^{1} Mauresmo withdrew prior to the quarterfinal match, which does not count as a loss.
- ^{2} Mauresmo won three qualifying matches to enter the main draw.

=== Grand Slam finals ===
==== Singles: 3 (2 titles, 1 runner-up) ====
Result	Year	Championship	Surface	Opponent	Score
Loss	1999	Australian Open	Hard	(Switzerland) Martina Hingis	2–6, 3–6
Win	2006	Australian Open	Hard	(Belgium) Justine Henin	6–1, 2–0 ret.
Win	2006	Wimbledon	Grass	(Belgium) Justine Henin	2–6, 6–3, 6–4

==== Doubles: 1 (runner-up) ====
Result	Year	Championship	Surface	Partner	Opponents	Score
Loss	2005	Wimbledon	Grass	(Russia) Svetlana Kuznetsova	(Zimbabwe) Cara Black (South Africa) Liezel Huber	2–6, 1–6

=== Olympic finals ===
==== Singles: 1 (silver medal) ====
Result	Year	Location	Surface	Opponent	Score
Silver	2004	Athens Olympics	Hard	(Belgium) Justine Henin	3–6, 3–6

== Fed Cup and Olympic teams ==
- French Fed Cup team: 1998–99, 2001–05.
- French Olympic team: 2000, 2004

== See also ==
- List of Grand Slam Women's Singles champions

Sporting positions
Preceded by (Belgium) Justine Henin (Belgium) Kim Clijsters	World No. 1; 13 September 2004 – 17 October 2004; 20 March 2006 – 12 November 2006	Succeeded by (United States) Lindsay Davenport (Belgium) Justine Henin
