= Yuko Hosoki =

Japanese tennis player (born 1968)

- Country (sports): Japan
- Born: 12 November 1968 (age 57) Osaka, Japan
- Prize money: $47,576

Singles
- Career record: 92–80
- Career titles: 0
- Highest ranking: No. 167 (21 July 1997)

Grand Slam singles results
- Wimbledon: Q2 (1997)
- US Open: Q1 (1997)

Doubles
- Career record: 89–60
- Career titles: 10 ITF
- Highest ranking: No. 134 (22 September 1997)

Grand Slam doubles results
- Wimbledon: Q1 (1997)

Yuko Hosoki (born 12 November 1968) is a Japanese former professional tennis player.

Hosoki had a best singles ranking of 167 in the world and won ten ITF doubles titles.

Her best WTA Tour performance came at the 1996 China Open, where she reached the second round of the singles and was a losing doubles finalist, partnering Kazue Takuma. She also made the second round of the 1997 Danamon Open in Jakarta, where she had a first-round upset win over fifth seed and world No. 57, Annabel Ellwood.

== WTA career finals ==
=== Doubles: 1 (0–1) ===
Result	Date	Tournament	Tier	Surface	Partner	Opponents	Score
Loss	Oct 1996	China Open, Beijing	Tier IV	Hard	(Japan) Kazue Takuma	(Japan) Naoko Kijimuta (Japan) Miho Saeki	5–7, 4–6

== ITF Circuit finals ==
$25,000 tournaments
$10,000 tournaments

=== Singles: 2 (0–2) ===
Result	No.	Date	Tournament	Surface	Opponent	Score
Loss	1.	23 October 1989	ITF Sekisho, Japan	Hard	(South Korea) Han Eun-ju	6–3, 3–6, 5–7
Loss	2.	26 May 1997	ITF Salzburg, Austria	Carpet	(Austria) Sabine Lutter	6–3, 1–6, 1–6

=== Doubles: 16 (10–6) ===
Result	No.	Date	Tournament	Surface	Partner	Opponents	Score
Win	1.	24 October 1988	ITF Ibaraki, Japan	Hard	(Japan) Kimiko Date	(Japan) Maya Kidowaki (Hong Kong) Paulette Moreno	6–4, 4–6, 9–7
Loss	1.	31 October 1988	ITF Saga, Japan	Grass	(Japan) Kimiko Date	(Japan) Maya Kidowaki (Japan) Naoko Sato	4–6, 5–7
Win	2.	7 November 1988	ITF Matsuyama, Japan	Hard	(Japan) Kimiko Date	(Japan) Yasuyo Kajita (Japan) Maya Kidowaki	7–5, 3–6, 7–5
Loss	2.	14 November 1988	ITF Kyoto, Japan	Hard	(Japan) Kimiko Date	(Japan) Kazuko Ito (Japan) Yasuyo Kajita	4–6, 5–7
Win	3.	19 February 1990	ITF Melbourne, Australia	Hard	(Japan) Ayako Hirose	(Australia) Danielle Jones (Australia) Sharon McNamara	6–3, 6–2
Loss	3.	5 March 1990	ITF Newcastle, Australia	Grass	(Japan) Ayako Hirose	(Australia) Kirrily Sharpe (Australia) Angie Woolcock	6–3, 5–7, 4–6
Win	4.	28 September 1992	ITF Ibaraki, Japan	Hard	(Japan) Naoko Kijimuta	(Japan) Lisa McShea (United States) Amy deLone	6–3, 2–2 ret.
Win	5.	5 October 1992	ITF Kuroshio, Japan	Hard	(Japan) Naoko Kijimuta	(Japan) Yuka Tanaka (Japan) Mami Donoshiro	6–2, 6–4
Win	6.	19 October 1992	ITF Kyoto, Japan	Hard	(Japan) Naoko Kijimuta	(United States) Varalee Sureephong (Japan) Masako Yanagi	6–3, 6–3
Loss	4.	28 June 1993	ITF Columbia, United States	Hard	(Japan) Naoko Kijimuta	(Japan) Keiko Nagatomi (Japan) Mika Todo	5–7, 4–6
Win	7.	5 July 1993	ITF Indianapolis, United States	Hard	(Japan) Naoko Kijimuta	(Australia) Kate McDonald (United States) Stephanie Reece	7–5, 6–3
Loss	5.	27 March 1995	ITF Jakarta, Indonesia	Hard	(South Korea) Park In-sook	(Thailand) Benjamas Sangaram (China) Lisa Tang	7–5, 5–7, 3–6
Win	8.	16 October 1995	ITF Kugayama, Japan	Hard	(Japan) Shinobu Asagoe	(Australia) Natalie Frawley (Australia) Jenny Anne Fetch	6–4, 7–6^{(3)}
Loss	6.	6 May 1996	ITF Seoul, South Korea	Clay	(Japan) Yuka Tanaka	(Australia) Catherine Barclay-Reitz (Australia) Kerry-Anne Guse	6–4, 0–6, 3–6
Win	9.	17 March 1997	ITF Noda, Japan	Hard	(Japan) Keiko Nagatomi	(South Korea) Choi Young-ja (South Korea) Jeon Mi-ra	6–2, 6–2
Win	10.	14 September 1998	ITF Ibaraki, Japan	Hard	(Chinese Taipei) Hsu Hsueh-li	(Japan) Riei Kawamata (Japan) Yoshiko Sasano	6–4, 4–6, 7–5
