= 1995 Nokia Open =

- Date: October 16–22 (men); September 25 – October 1 (women)
- Edition: 3rd (men) / 2nd (women)
- Surface: Hard / indoor
- Location: Beijing, China

Champions

Men's singles
- (United States) Michael Chang

Women's singles
- (United States) Linda Wild

Men's doubles
- (Canada) Sébastien Lareau / (United States) Tommy Ho

Women's doubles
- (Germany) Claudia Porwik / (United States) Linda Wild
- Nokia Open

The 1995 Nokia Open was a tennis tournament played on indoor hard courts in Beijing, China that was part of the World Series of the 1995 ATP Tour and of Tier IV of the 1995 WTA Tour. The men's tournament was held from October 16 through October 22, 1995, while the women's tournament was held from September 25 through October 1, 1995.

== Finals ==
=== Men's singles ===
(United States) Michael Chang defeated (Italy) Renzo Furlan 7–5, 6–3

- It was Chang's 4th title of the year and the 23rd of his career.

=== Women's singles ===
(United States) Linda Wild defeated (Chinese Taipei) Shi-Ting Wang 7–5, 6–2

- It was Wild's 3rd title of the year and the 7th of her career.

=== Men's doubles ===
(United States) Tommy Ho / (Canada) Sébastien Lareau defeated (Belgium) Dick Norman / (Netherlands) Fernon Wibier 7–6, 7–6

- It was Ho's 3rd title of the year and the 4th of his career. It was Lareau's 2nd career title.

=== Women's doubles ===
(Germany) Claudia Porwik / (United States) Linda Wild defeated (Netherlands) Stephanie Rottier / (Chinese Taipei) Shi-Ting Wang 6–1, 6–0

- It was Porwik's 2nd title of the year and the 6th of her career. It was Wild's 4th title of the year and the 8th of her career.
