= Miho Saeki =

Japanese tennis player (born 1976)

Miho Saeki 佐伯美穂
- Country (sports): Japan
- Residence: Tokyo, Japan
- Born: 18 March 1976 (age 50) New York, United States
- Height: 1.68 m (5 ft 6 in)
- Turned pro: 1998
- Plays: Right-handed (two-handed backhand)
- Prize money: $600,516

Singles
- Career record: 291–227
- Career titles: 16 ITF
- Highest ranking: No. 56 (8 June 1998)

Grand Slam singles results
- Australian Open: 2R (1998, 1999)
- French Open: 3R (1998)
- Wimbledon: 2R (1999)
- US Open: 2R (1998)

Doubles
- Career record: 138–121
- Career titles: 4 WTA, 8 ITF
- Highest ranking: No. 49 (7 July 1997)

Grand Slam doubles results
- Australian Open: 2R (1996)
- French Open: 2R (1997, 1999)
- Wimbledon: 2R (1997, 1998)
- US Open: QF (1998)

Miho Saeki (佐伯美穂, Saeki Miho) (born 18 March 1976) is a Japanese former tennis player, winner of professional tournaments in doubles and singles, and a representative of Japan in the Federation Cup.

== Career ==
Saeki's career began officially in April 1994. As a junior finale, she boasts a doubles tournament in the youth edition of the Japan Open. In senior tennis, she began mainly outside the main cycle of the WTA Tour, winning a total of 16 singles and eight doubles titles belonging to the ITF Women's Circuit. She gained four wins in doubles on WTA Tour, with her partners - Yuka Yoshida and Naoko Kijimuta. Her career-high ranking was at No. 56 in singles (June 1998) and No. 49 in doubles (July 1997).

In 1998-1999 she appeared in the Japanese team for the Federation Cup (only singles). Defeated, among others well-known Dutch woman Miriam Oremans, and the total balance of the performances is a tie - three wins and three defeats.

== Performance timeline ==
Key
W	F	SF	QF	#R	RR	Q#	DNQ	A	NH

(W) winner; (F) finalist; (SF) semifinalist; (QF) quarterfinalist; (#R) rounds 4, 3, 2, 1; (RR) round-robin stage; (Q#) qualification round; (DNQ) did not qualify; (A) absent; (NH) not held; (SR) strike rate (events won / competed); (W–L) win–loss record.

=== Singles ===
Tournament	1998	1999	W–L	Win %
Grand Slam tournaments
Australian Open	2R	2R	0–0	–
French Open	3R		0–0	–
Wimbledon		2R	0–0	–
US Open	2R		0–0	–
Win–loss		0–0	–	

=== Doubles ===
Tournament	1996	1997	1998	1999	W–L	Win %
Grand Slam tournaments
Australian Open	2R				0–0	–
French Open					0–0	–
Wimbledon					0–0	–
US Open					0–0	–
Win–loss			0–0	0–0	0–0	–

== WTA career finals ==
=== Doubles: 4 (4 titles) ===
Legend
Tier I (0–0)
Tier II (0–0)
Tier III (2–0)
Tier IV & V (2–0)

Result	Date	Tournament	Surface	Partner	Opponents	Score
Win	Apr 1995	Japan Open	Hard	(Japan) Yuka Yoshida	(Japan) Kyōko Nagatsuka (Japan) Ai Sugiyama	6–7^{(5–7)}, 6–4, 7–6^{(7–5)}
Win	Oct 1996	China Open	Hard	(Japan) Naoko Kijimuta	(Japan) Yuko Hosoki (Japan) Kazue Takuma	7–5, 6–4
Win	Nov 1996	Thailand Open	Hard	(Japan) Yuka Yoshida	(Slovenia) Tina Križan (Japan) Nana Miyagi	6–2, 6–3
Win	Feb 2005	National Indoor Championships, US	Hard (i)	(Japan) Yuka Yoshida	(United States) Laura Granville (United States) Abigail Spears	6–3, 6–4

== ITF Circuit finals ==
Legend
$75,000 tournaments
$50,000 tournaments
$25,000 tournaments
$10,000 tournaments

=== Singles: 18 (16–2) ===
Result	No.	Date	Tournament	Surface	Opponent	Score
Loss	1.	17 October 1994	ITF Kugayama, Japan	Hard	(South Korea) Kim Il-soon	4–6, 0–6
Win	2.	6 March 1995	ITF Alicante, Spain	Clay	(Spain) Patricia Aznar	7–5, 4–6, 6–2
Win	3.	20 March 1995	ITF Castellón, Spain	Clay	(Serbia) Dragana Zarić	6–1, 1–6, 7–6^{(2)}
Win	4.	21 July 1996	ITF Wilmington, United States	Hard	(United States) Debbie Graham	4–6, 6–4, 6–4
Win	5.	6 October 1997	ITF Indian Wells, United States	Hard	(Israel) Anna Smashnova	6–1, 6–4
Win	6.	13 November 2000	ITF Manila, Philippines	Hard	(Indonesia) Romana Tedjakusuma	4–0, 4–0
Win	7.	18 February 2001	ITF Faro, Portugal	Hard	(Italy) Alberta Brianti	6–3, 6–1
Win	8.	11 March 2001	ITF Warrnambool, Australia	Grass	(Australia) Samantha Stosur	6–4, 6–4
Win	9.	18 March 2001	ITF Benalla, Australia	Grass	(Australia) Kristen van Elden	3–6, 6–1, 6–2
Win	10.	1 April 2001	ITF Corowa, Australia	Grass	(Australia) Kristen van Elden	6–1, 6–2
Win	11.	29 July 2001	ITF Vancouver, Canada	Hard	(Canada) Mélanie Marois	6–1, 6–4
Win	12.	5 August 2001	ITF Vancouver, Canada	Hard	(United States) Sarah Taylor	6–4, 6–1
Win	13.	18 February 2001	ITF Seoul, South Korea	Hard	(South Korea) Cho Yoon-jeong	6–3, 6–0
Win	14.	27 July 2003	Lexington Challenger, United States	Hard	(Georgia (country)) Salome Devidze	6–4, 2–6, 7–5
Win	15.	19 July 2005	ITF Hammond, United States	Hard	(Romania) Anda Perianu	6–3, 2–6, 6–1
Win	16.	9 August 2005	ITF Wuxi, China	Hard	(China) Sun Shengnan	6–2, 7–6^{(1)}
Win	17.	21 August 2005	ITF Nanjing, China	Hard	(Chinese Taipei) Hsu Wen-hsin	6–2, 6–2
Loss	18.	5 November 2005	ITF Shenzhen, China	Hard	(Thailand) Tamarine Tanasugarn	2–6, 4–6

=== Doubles: 10 (8–2) ===
Result	No.	Date	Tournament	Surface	Partner	Opponents	Score
Win	1.	21 November 1993	ITF Nonthaburi, Thailand	Hard	(Chinese Taipei) Weng Tzu-ting	(South Korea) Choi Ju-yeon (South Korea) Yoo Kyung-sook	3–6, 6–3, 6–3
Win	2.	15 May 1994	ITF Bracknell, United Kingdom	Hard	(Spain) Gemma Magin	(United Kingdom) Michele Mair (South Africa) Karen van der Merwe	4–6, 6–3, 6–4
Win	3.	27 March 1995	ITF Alicante, Spain	Clay	(Bulgaria) Teodora Nedeva	(Spain) Patricia Aznar (Spain) Elisa Penalvo Lopez	6–3, 6–1
Win	4.	27 October 1997	ITF Austin, United States	Hard	(South Korea) Park Sung-hee	(United States) Debbie Graham (United States) Meredith McGrath	6–4, 5–7, 6–2
Win	5.	25 October 1998	ITF Houston, United States	Hard	(Japan) Nana Smith	(Japan) Rika Hiraki (South Korea) Kim Eun-ha	6–1, 4–6, 6–1
Loss	6.	20 November 2000	ITF Manila, Philippines	Hard	(Japan) Remi Uda	(India) Rushmi Chakravarthi (India) Sai Jayalakshmy Jayaram	3–5, 1–4, 2–4
Win	7.	11 June 2001	ITF Tallinn, Estonia	Clay	(Japan) Akiko Morigami	(Russia) Natalia Egorova (Russia) Ekaterina Sysoeva	6–2, 7–6^{(7)}
Win	8.	29 July 2001	ITF Vancouver, Canada	Hard	(Japan) Kaori Aoyama	(United States) Annica Cooper (United States) Elizabeth Schmidt	5–7, 6–3, 7–6
Win	9.	14 July 2002	ITF College Park, United States	Hard	(Japan) Yuka Yoshida	(United States) Teryn Ashley (United States) Jennifer Russell	7–5, 6–1
Loss	10.	28 July 2002	ITF Louisville, United States	Hard	(Czech Republic) Renata Voráčová	(Japan) Nana Miyagi (Kazakhstan) Irina Selyutina	7–5, 1–6, 5–7
