= Chen Li (tennis) =

Chinese tennis player

Chen Li (陳 莉)
- Country (sports): China
- Born: 13 March 1971 (age 54); Xiangtan, Hunan
- Height: 1.65 m (5 ft 5 in)
- Prize money: $92,814

Singles
- Career record: 145–88
- Career titles: 0 WTA, 6 ITF
- Highest ranking: No. 112 (21 October 1996)

Grand Slam singles results
- Australian Open: 1R (1997)

Doubles
- Career record: 62–47
- Career titles: 1 WTA
- Highest ranking: No. 135 (13 February 1995)

Grand Slam doubles results
- US Open: 1R (1994)

Team competitions
- Fed Cup: 7–14
Medal record
Women's tennis
Asian Games
Gold medal – first place	1998 Bangkok	Women's doubles
Silver medal – second place	1990 Beijing	Women's singles
Silver medal – second place	1994 Hiroshima	Women's doubles
Silver medal – second place	1998 Bangkok	Women's team
Bronze medal – third place	1990 Beijing	Women's team
Bronze medal – third place	1994 Hiroshima	Women's singles
Bronze medal – third place	1994 Hiroshima	Women's team

Chen Li (born 13 March 1971) is a former professional tennis player from China.

== Career ==
Chen, who comes from the city of Xiangtan in Hunan, played on the WTA Tour in the 1990s and won one title, the doubles at the 1994 China Open, with Li Fang as her partner. In 1996 she was runner-up in the singles at the Nokia Open in Beijing. En route to the final, which she lost to Wang Shi-ting, she accounted for three seeded players, Francesca Lubiani, Yayuk Basuki and Sandrine Testud. She competed as a wildcard at the 1997 Australian Open and was beaten in the first round by Natalia Medvedeva.

A two-time Olympian, Chen represented China at the 1992 Summer Olympics in Barcelona and 1996 Summer Olympics in Atlanta. At the Barcelona Olympics she lost in the first round to eventual bronze medalist Mary Joe Fernández. In Atlanta she competed in both the singles and doubles draws. She lost to top seed Monica Seles in the singles but her and Yi Jing-Qian made the second round of the doubles competition. They progressed in a walkover after fifth seeded Australian pairing had to withdraw when Rennae Stubbs was taken ill to hospital. In the second round the Chinese pair were beaten in three sets by the team from Thailand.

Chen won a total of seven medals for China at the Asian Games. This includes a gold medal in the women's doubles with Li Fang at the 1998 Asian Games in Bangkok.

In Fed Cup competition, Chen featured in 17 ties for a record 7–14 overall. One of these ties was against the United States in the second round of the World Group in the 1993 Federation Cup.

== WTA Tour finals ==
=== Singles: 1 (runner-up) ===
Result	Date	Tournament	Tier	Surface	Opponent	Score
Loss	Oct 1996	China Open, Beijing	Tier IV	Hard	(Chinese Taipei) Wang Shi-ting	3–6, 4–6

=== Doubles: 1 (title) ===
Result	Date	Tournament	Tier	Surface	Partner	Opponents	Score
Win	Feb 1994	China Open, Beijing	Tier IV	Hard	(China) Li Fang	(Australia) Kerry-Anne Guse (United Kingdom) Valda Lake	6–0, 6–2

== ITF finals ==
$25,000 tournaments
$10,000 tournaments

=== Singles (6–7) ===
Result	No.	Date	Location	Surface	Opponent	Score
Loss	1.	31 October 1988	Saga, Japan	Grass	(Japan) Maya Kidowaki	4–6, 6–3, 3–6
Loss	2.	7 May 1990	Manila, Philippines	Hard	(China) Tang Min	6–7, 0–6
Win	3.	30 September 1991	Sekisho, Japan	Hard	(South Korea) Park Sung-hee	6–2, 6–4
Loss	4.	7 October 1991	Matsuyama, Japan	Hard	(China) Li Fang	4–6, 3–6
Loss	5.	10 February 1992	Bangkok, Thailand	Hard	(China) Yi Jingqian	7–6, 3–6, 0–6
Loss	6.	17 February 1992	Bandung, Indonesia	Hard	(Indonesia) Irawati Iskandar	7–5, 4–6, 3–6
Loss	7.	24 February 1992	Solo, Indonesia	Hard	(China) Yi Jingqian	3–6, 4–6
Win	8.	21 June 1993	Tianjin, China	Hard	(China) Yi Jingqian	7–5, 2–6, 7–5
Win	9.	12 December 1994	Manila, Philippines	Hard	(South Korea) Choi Ju-yeon	6–1, 6–4
Win	10.	31 July 1995	Austin, United States	Hard	(China) Yi Jingqian	6–1, 2–6, 6–4
Win	11.	2 September 1996	Beijing, China	Hard	(China) Chen Jingjing	7–6, 4–6, 6–1
Win	12.	9 March 1997	Blenheim, New Zealand	Hard	(Thailand) Benjamas Sangaram	6–2, 6–2
Loss	13.	23 April 2000	Dalian, China	Hard	(China) Li Na	4–6, 4–6

=== Doubles (7–2) ===
Result	No.	Date	Location	Surface	Partner	Opponents	Score
Win	1.	7 May 1990	Manila, Philippines	Hard	(China) Li Fang	(China) Lin Ning (China) Tang Min	6–3, 6–0
Win	2.	17 February 1992	Bandung, Indonesia	Hard	(China) Yi Jingqian	(Japan) Mami Donoshiro (Japan) Ai Sugiyama	4–6, 6–3, 6–4
Win	3.	24 February 1992	Solo, Indonesia	Hard	(China) Yi Jingqian	(Indonesia) Mimma Chernovita (Indonesia) Natalia Soetrisno	6–2, 6–2
Win	4.	6 July 1992	Erlangen, Germany	Clay	(Japan) Miki Yokobori	(Germany) Caroline Schneider (Australia) Angie Woolcock	6–4, 6–2
Win	5.	14 June 1993	Beijing, China	Hard	(China) Yi Jingqian	(South Korea) Kim Yeon-sook (South Korea) Kim Ih-sook	6–4, 6–1
Loss	6.	21 June 1993	Tianjin, China	Hard	(China) Yi Jingqian	(South Korea) Kim Hye-jeong (South Korea) Seo Hye-jin	2–6, 2–6
Win	7.	19 December 1994	Manila, Philippines	Hard	(China) Yi Jingqian	(Japan) Keiko Ishida (South Korea) Park In-sook	6–2, 7–5
Win	8.	4 September 1995	Tianjin, China	Hard	(China) Li Fang	(Germany) Kirstin Freye (South Africa) Tessa Price	6–2, 6–3
Loss	9.	2 September 1996	Beijing, China	Hard	(China) Yi Jingqian	(China) Chen Jingjing (China) Li Li	6–2, 5–7, ret.
