= Wang Shi-ting =

Taiwanese tennis player (born 1973)

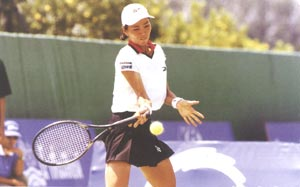
- Native name: 王思婷
- Country (sports): Chinese Taipei
- Residence: Tainan
- Born: 19 October 1973 (age 51); Tainan
- Height: 1.70 m (5 ft 7 in)
- Turned pro: 1991
- Retired: 2000
- Plays: Right (two-handed backhand)
- Prize money: $775,006

Singles
- Career record: 218–130
- Career titles: 6 WTA, 8 ITF
- Highest ranking: No. 26 (1 November 1993)

Grand Slam singles results
- Australian Open: 3R (1997)
- French Open: 3R (1994, 1995)
- Wimbledon: 2R (1997, 1998)
- US Open: 3R (1994)

Doubles
- Career record: 74–87
- Career titles: 1 ITF
- Highest ranking: No. 39 (23 February 1998)

Grand Slam doubles results
- Australian Open: 3R (1997, 1998)
- French Open: 3R (1996)
- Wimbledon: 2R (1997, 1998)
- US Open: 3R (1996, 1998)

Team competitions
- Fed Cup: 51–25
Medal record
Representing Chinese Taipei
Women's Tennis
Asian Games
Gold medal – first place	1998 Bangkok	Women's Team
Bronze medal – third place	1994 Hiroshima	Women's Team
Universiade
Gold medal – first place	1999 Palma de Majorca	Women's Doubles
Silver medal – second place	1999 Palma de Majorca	Women's Singles
Silver medal – second place	1999 Palma de Majorca	Mixed Doubles
Gold medal – first place	1997 Sicily	Women's Singles
Gold medal – first place	1997 Sicily	Women's Doubles
Silver medal – second place	1997 Sicily	Mixed Doubles
Gold medal – first place	1995 Fukuoka	Mixed Doubles
Silver medal – second place	1995 Fukuoka	Women's Doubles
Bronze medal – third place	1995 Fukuoka	Women's Singles

Wang Shi-Ting (Chinese: 王思婷; pinyin: Wáng Sītíng; born 19 October 1973) is a former tennis player from Taiwan.

She turned professional in 1991. In her career, she won six singles titles on the WTA Tour. She played 49 times over 11 years for Chinese Taipei Fed Cup team, earning a 51–25 overall record and setting many team records.

Wang retired from the tour in 2000. Since 2006, she has been the captain of the Chinese Taipei Fed Cup team.

== WTA Tour finals ==
=== Singles: 7 (6 titles, 1 runner-up) ===
Outcome	No.	Date	Tournament	Surface	Opponent	Score
Winner	1.	Sep 1993	Hong Kong Open	Hard	(United States) Marianne Witmeyer	6–4, 3–6, 7–5
Winner	2.	Oct 1993	Taipei Open, Taiwan	Hard	(United States) Linda Wild	6–1, 7–6^{(7–4)}
Winner	3.	Nov 1994	Taipei Open, Taiwan	Hard	(Japan) Kyoko Nagatsuka	6–1, 6–3
Runner-up	1.	Sep 1995	China Open	Hard	(United States) Linda Wild	5–7, 2–6
Winner	4.	Oct 1995	Surabaya Classic, Indonesia	Hard	(China) Yi Jingqian	6–1, 6–1
Winner	5.	Oct 1996	Surabaya Classic, Indonesia	Hard	(Japan) Nana Miyagi	6–4, 6–0
Winner	6.	Oct 1996	China Open	Hard	(China) Chen Li	6–3, 6–4

=== Doubles: 3 (runner-ups) ===
Outcome	No.	Date	Tournament	Surface	Partner	Opponents	Score
Runner-up	1.	Sep 1995	China Open	Hard	(Netherlands) Stephanie Rottier	(Germany) Claudia Porwik (United States) Linda Wild	1–6, 0–6
Runner-up	2.	Sep 1996	Tokyo International, Japan	Hard	(South Korea) Park Sung-hee	(South Africa) Amanda Coetzer (France) Mary Pierce	3–6, 6–7
Runner-up	3.	Jan 1998	Australian Women's Hardcourts	Hard	(South Korea) Park Sung-hee	(Russia) Elena Likhovtseva (Japan) Ai Sugiyama	6–1, 3–6, 4–6

== ITF finals ==
Legend
$50,000 tournaments
$25,000 tournaments
$10,000 tournaments

=== Singles (8–1) ===
Outcome	No.	Date	Tournament	Surface	Opponent	Score
Winner	1.	29 April 1991	ITF Kuala Lumpur, Malaysia	Hard	(China) Li Fang	6–4, 6–2
Winner	2.	12 May 1991	ITF Manila, Philippines	Hard	(China) Yang Li Hua	6–1, 4–6, 6–3
Winner	3.	5 August 1991	ITF Taipei, Taiwan	Hard	(South Korea) Kim Il-soon	4–6, 6–4, 6–4
Winner	4.	18 August 1991	ITF Taipei, Taiwan	Hard	(South Korea) Sohn Mi-ae	6–2, 6–3
Winner	5.	19 August 1991	ITF Taipei, Taiwan	Clay	(South Korea) Kim Il-soon	6–2, 2–6, 6–2
Winner	6.	26 August 1991	ITF Taipei, Taiwan	Clay	(South Korea) Kim Yeon-sook	3–6, 6–3, 6–1
Runner-up	7.	10 November 1991	ITF Kofu, Japan	Hard	(Japan) Mana Endo	4–6, 0–6
Winner	8.	10 August 1997	ITF Jakarta, Indonesia	Clay	(Argentina) Geraldine Aizenberg	6–1, 6–4
Winner	9.	2 May 1999	Kōfu International Open, Japan	Grass	(South Korea) Park Sung-hee	6–7, 7–5, 6–2

=== Doubles (1–1) ===
Outcome	No.	Date	Tournament	Surface	Partner	Opponents	Score
Winner	1.	21 July 1997	ITF Jakarta, Indonesia	Clay	(Chinese Taipei) Hsu Hsueh-li	(Japan) Tomoe Hotta (Japan) Yoriko Yamagishi	6–4, 6–4
Runner-up	2.	14 September 1997	ITF Seoul, South Korea	Hard	(South Korea) Park Sung-hee	(Australia) Catherine Barclay (Australia) Kerry-Anne Guse	6–4, 4–6, 1–6
