= China Open (tennis) =

Annual tennis tournament in Beijing, China

Coordinates: 40.019°N 116.373°E

- 2026 China Open (tennis)
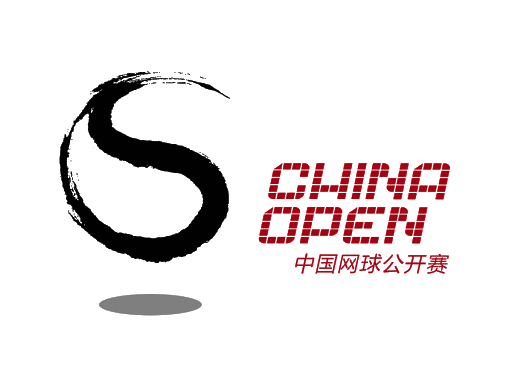

Tournament information
- Event name: 中国网球公开赛
- Founded: 1993; 33 years ago
- Location: Beijing (1993–present); China
- Venue: Beijing International Tennis Center (1993–1997); Beijing Tennis Center (2004–2008); National Tennis Center (2009–present)
- Surface: Carpet / indoor (1993–1997); Hard / outdoor (2004–current)
- Website: chinaopen.com/en/

Current champions (2026)
- Men's singles: (Serbia) Novak Djokovic
- Women's singles: (China) Zheng Qinwen
- Men's doubles: (Finland) Harri Heliövaara (United Kingdom) Henry Patten
- Women's doubles: (Canada) Gabriela Dabrowski (Brazil) Luisa Stefani
ATP Tour
- Category: ATP Tour 500; 2009–current ATP International Series / ATP World Series; 1993–2008
- Draw: 32S/16Q/16D
- Prize money: US$4,089,385 (2026)
WTA Tour
- Category: WTA 1000
- Draw: 96S/48Q/32D
- Prize money: US$9,415,725 (2026)

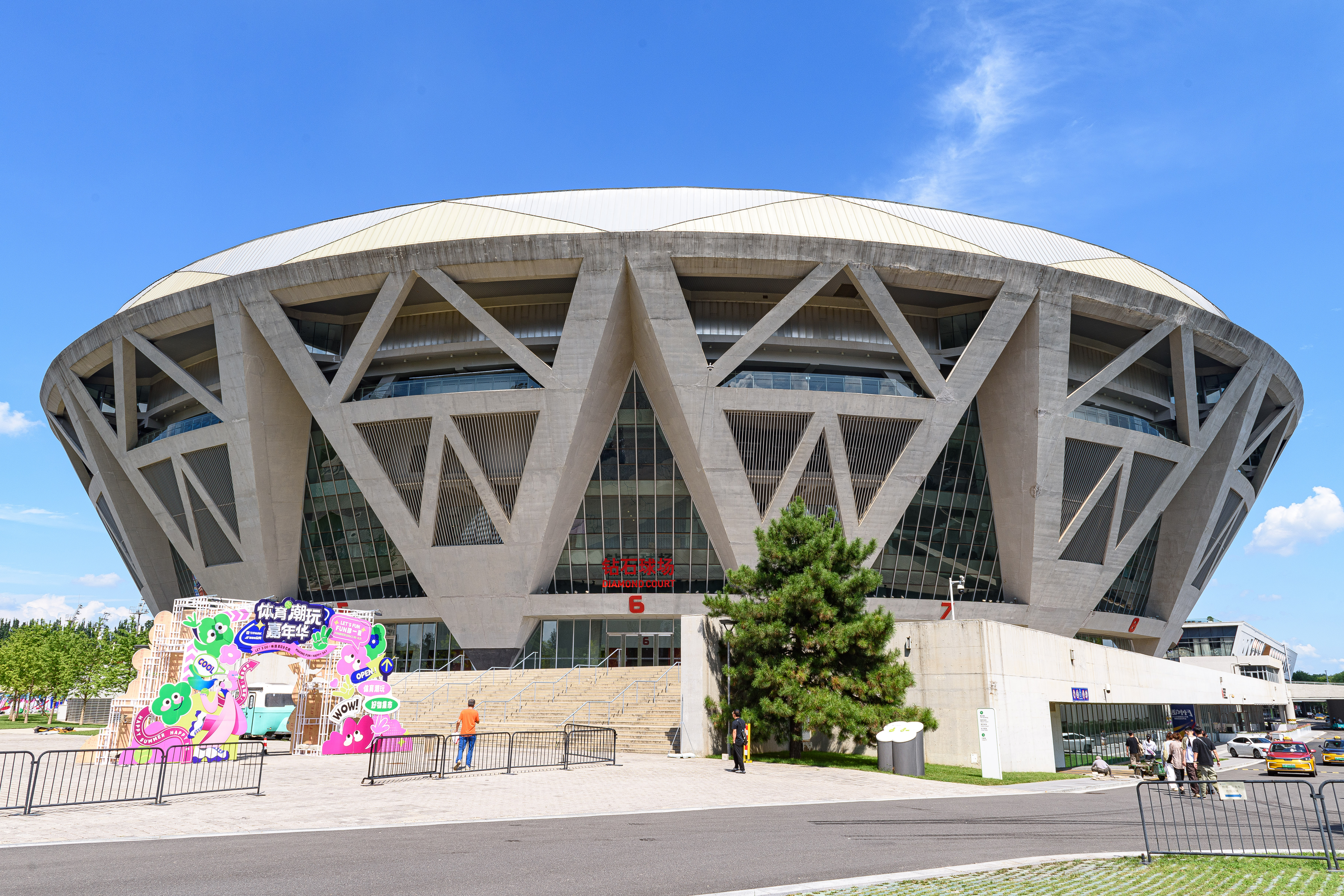
The central court of the China Open

The China Open (Chinese: 中国网球公开赛) is a hardcourt tennis tournament organized by the Chinese Tennis Association annually at the China National Tennis Center in Beijing, China. It is held in late September and early October. The women's event is a WTA 1000 event on the WTA Tour, while the men's is an ATP 500 event on the ATP Tour.

The tournament was first held in 1993, discontinued in 1998, and reinstated in 2004. In 2006, the China Open became the first tournament outside the United States to use the Hawk-Eye system in match play.

In 2025 the combined total prize money was close to US$13 million, the highest for tournaments of the same level.

== Past finals ==
=== Women's singles ===
Year	Champions	Runners-up	Score
↓ WTA Tier IV ↓
1994	(Indonesia) Yayuk Basuki (1/1)	(Japan) Kyōko Nagatsuka	6–4, 6–2
1995	(United States) Linda Wild (1/1)	(Chinese Taipei) Wang Shi-ting	7–5, 6–2
1996	(Chinese Taipei) Wang Shi-ting (1/1)	(China) Chen Li	6–3, 6–4
1997– 2003	Not held		
↓ WTA Tier II ↓
2004	(United States) Serena Williams (1/2)	(Russia) Svetlana Kuznetsova	4–6, 7–5, 6–4
2005	(Russia) Maria Kirilenko (1/1)	(Germany) Anna-Lena Grönefeld	6–3, 6–4
2006	(Russia) Svetlana Kuznetsova (1/2)	(France) Amélie Mauresmo	6–4, 6–0
2007	(Hungary) Ágnes Szávay (1/1)	(Serbia) Jelena Janković	6–7^{(7–9)}, 7–5, 6–2
2008	(Serbia) Jelena Janković (1/1)	(Russia) Svetlana Kuznetsova	6–3, 6–2
↓ WTA Premier Mandatory ↓
2009	(Russia) Svetlana Kuznetsova (2/2)	(Poland) Agnieszka Radwańska	6–2, 6–4
2010	(Denmark) Caroline Wozniacki (1/2)	(Russia) Vera Zvonareva	6–3, 3–6, 6–3
2011	(Poland) Agnieszka Radwańska (1/2)	(Germany) Andrea Petkovic	7–5, 0–6, 6–4
2012	(Belarus) Victoria Azarenka (1/1)	(Russia) Maria Sharapova	6–3, 6–1
2013	(United States) Serena Williams (2/2)	(Serbia) Jelena Janković	6–2, 6–2
2014	(Russia) Maria Sharapova (1/1)	(Czech Republic) Petra Kvitová	6–4, 2–6, 6–3
2015	(Spain) Garbiñe Muguruza (1/1)	(Switzerland) Timea Bacsinszky	7–5, 6–4
2016	(Poland) Agnieszka Radwańska (2/2)	(United Kingdom) Johanna Konta	6–4, 6–2
2017	(France) Caroline Garcia (1/1)	(Romania) Simona Halep	6–4, 7–6^{(7–3)}
2018	(Denmark) Caroline Wozniacki (2/2)	(Latvia) Anastasija Sevastova	6–3, 6–3
2019	(Japan) Naomi Osaka (1/1)	(Australia) Ashleigh Barty	3–6, 6–3, 6–2
2020– 2022	No competition (due to COVID-19 pandemic)		
↓ WTA 1000 ↓
2023	(Poland) Iga Świątek (1/1)	(Note: Competed under no flag due to the Russian invasion of Ukraine.) Liudmila Samsonova	6–2, 6–2
2024	(United States) Coco Gauff (1/1)	(Czech Republic) Karolína Muchová	6–1, 6–3
2025	(United States) Amanda Anisimova (1/1)	(Czech Republic) Linda Nosková	6–0, 2–6, 6–2
2026	(China) Zheng Qinwen (1/1)	Mirra Andreeva	7–5, 6–4

=== Men's singles ===
Year	Champions	Runners-up	Score
↓ ATP Tour 250 (Note: Known as World Series from 1990 till 1999. Championship Series from 2000 till 2008.) ↓
1993	(United States) Michael Chang (1/3)	(Canada) Greg Rusedski	7–6^{(7–5)}, 6–7^{(6–8)}, 6–4
1994	(United States) Michael Chang (2/3)	(Sweden) Anders Järryd	7–5, 7–5
1995	(United States) Michael Chang (3/3)	(Italy) Renzo Furlan	7–5, 6–3
1996	(United Kingdom) Greg Rusedski (1/1)	(Czech Republic) Martin Damm	7–6^{(7–5)}, 6–4
1997	(United States) Jim Courier (1/1)	(Sweden) Magnus Gustafsson	7–6^{(12–10)}, 3–6, 6–3
1998– 2003	Not held		
2004	(Russia) Marat Safin (1/1)	(Russia) Mikhail Youzhny	7–6^{(7–4)}, 7–5
2005	(Spain) Rafael Nadal (1/2)	(Argentina) Guillermo Coria	5–7, 6–1, 6–2
2006	(Cyprus) Marcos Baghdatis (1/1)	(Croatia) Mario Ančić	6–4, 6–0
2007	(Chile) Fernando González (1/1)	(Spain) Tommy Robredo	6–1, 3–6, 6–1
2008	(United States) Andy Roddick (1/1)	(Israel) Dudi Sela	6–4, 6–7^{(6–8)}, 6–3
↓ ATP Tour 500 ↓
2009	(Serbia) Novak Djokovic (1/7)	(Croatia) Marin Čilić	6–2, 7–6^{(7–4)}
2010	(Serbia) Novak Djokovic (2/7)	(Spain) David Ferrer	6–2, 6–4
2011	(Czech Republic) Tomáš Berdych (1/1)	(Croatia) Marin Čilić	3–6, 6–4, 6–1
2012	(Serbia) Novak Djokovic (3/7)	(France) Jo-Wilfried Tsonga	7–6^{(7–4)}, 6–2
2013	(Serbia) Novak Djokovic (4/7)	(Spain) Rafael Nadal	6–3, 6–4
2014	(Serbia) Novak Djokovic (5/7)	(Czech Republic) Tomáš Berdych	6–0, 6–2
2015	(Serbia) Novak Djokovic (6/7)	(Spain) Rafael Nadal	6–2, 6–2
2016	(United Kingdom) Andy Murray (1/1)	(Bulgaria) Grigor Dimitrov	6–4, 7–6^{(7–2)}
2017	(Spain) Rafael Nadal (2/2)	(Australia) Nick Kyrgios	6–2, 6–1
2018	(Georgia (country)) Nikoloz Basilashvili (1/1)	(Argentina) Juan Martín del Potro	6–4, 6–4
2019	(Austria) Dominic Thiem (1/1)	(Greece) Stefanos Tsitsipas	3–6, 6–4, 6–1
2020– 2022	No competition (due to COVID-19 pandemic)		
2023	(Italy) Jannik Sinner (1/2)	Daniil Medvedev	7–6^{(7–2)}, 7–6^{(7–2)}
2024	(Spain) Carlos Alcaraz (1/1)	(Italy) Jannik Sinner	6–7^{(6–8)}, 6–4, 7–6^{(7–3)}
2025	(Italy) Jannik Sinner (2/2)	(United States) Learner Tien	6–2, 6–2
2026	(Serbia) Novak Djokovic (7/7)	(Australia) Alex de Minaur	7–6^{(7–3)}, 0–1 ret.

=== Women's doubles ===
Year	Champions	Runners-up	Score
↓ WTA Tier II ↓
2004	(Switzerland) Emmanuelle Gagliardi (Russia) Dinara Safina	(Argentina) Gisela Dulko (Venezuela) María Vento-Kabchi	6–4, 6–4
2005	(Spain) Nuria Llagostera Vives (Venezuela) María Vento-Kabchi	(China) Yan Zi (China) Zheng Jie	6–2, 6–4
2006	(Spain) Virginia Ruano Pascual (Argentina) Paola Suárez	(Russia) Anna Chakvetadze (Russia) Elena Vesnina	6–2, 6–4
2007	(Chinese Taipei) Chuang Chia-jung (Chinese Taipei) Hsieh Su-wei	(China) Han Xinyun (China) Xu Yifan	7–6^{(7–1)}, 6–3
2008	(Spain) Anabel Medina Garrigues (Denmark) Caroline Wozniacki	(China) Han Xinyun (China) Xu Yifan	6–1, 6–3
↓ WTA Premier Mandatory ↓
2009	(Chinese Taipei) Hsieh Su-wei (2) (China) Peng Shuai	(Russia) Alla Kudryavtseva (Russia) Ekaterina Makarova	6–3, 6–1
2010	(Belarus) Olga Govortsova (Chinese Taipei) Chuang Chia-jung	(Argentina) Gisela Dulko (Italy) Flavia Pennetta	7–6^{(7–2)}, 1–6, [10–7]
2011	(Czech Republic) Květa Peschke (Slovenia) Katarina Srebotnik	(Argentina) Gisela Dulko (Italy) Flavia Pennetta	6–3, 6–4
2012	(Russia) Ekaterina Makarova (Russia) Elena Vesnina	(Spain) Nuria Llagostera Vives (India) Sania Mirza	7–5, 7–5
2013	(Zimbabwe) Cara Black (India) Sania Mirza	(Russia) Vera Dushevina (Spain) Arantxa Parra Santonja	6–2, 6–2
2014	(Czech Republic) Andrea Hlaváčková (China) Peng Shuai (2)	(Zimbabwe) Cara Black (India) Sania Mirza	6–4, 6–4
2015	(Switzerland) Martina Hingis (India) Sania Mirza (2)	(Chinese Taipei) Chan Hao-ching (Chinese Taipei) Chan Yung-jan	6–7^{(9–11)}, 6–1, [10–8]
2016	(United States) Bethanie Mattek-Sands (Czech Republic) Lucie Šafářová	(France) Caroline Garcia (France) Kristina Mladenovic	6–4, 6–4
2017	(Chinese Taipei) Chan Yung-jan (Switzerland) Martina Hingis (2)	(Hungary) Tímea Babos (Czech Republic) Andrea Hlaváčková	6–1, 6–4
2018	(Czech Republic) Andrea Sestini Hlaváčková (2) (Czech Republic) Barbora Strýcová	(Canada) Gabriela Dabrowski (China) Xu Yifan	4–6, 6–4, [10–8]
2019	(United States) Sofia Kenin (United States) Bethanie Mattek-Sands (2)	(Latvia) Jeļena Ostapenko (Ukraine) Dayana Yastremska	6–3, 6–7^{(5–7)}, [10–7]
2020– 2022	No competition (due to COVID-19 pandemic)		
↓ WTA 1000 ↓
2023	(Czech Republic) Marie Bouzková (Spain) Sara Sorribes Tormo	(Chinese Taipei) Chan Hao-ching (Mexico) Giuliana Olmos	3–6, 6–0, [10–4]
2024	(Italy) Sara Errani (Italy) Jasmine Paolini	(Chinese Taipei) Chan Hao-ching; Veronika Kudermetova	6–4, 6–4
2025	(Italy) Sara Errani (2) (Italy) Jasmine Paolini (2)	(Japan) Miyu Kato (Hungary) Fanny Stollár	6–7^{(1–7)}, 6–3, [10–2]
2026	(Canada) Gabriela Dabrowski (Brazil) Luisa Stefani	(Czech Republic) Kateřina Siniaková (China) Zhang Shuai	6–1, 6–2

=== Men's doubles ===
Year	Champions	Runners-up	Score
↓ ATP Tour 250 ↓
2004	(United States) Justin Gimelstob (United States) Graydon Oliver	(United States) Alex Bogomolov Jr. (United States) Taylor Dent	4–6, 6–4, 7–6
2005	(United States) Justin Gimelstob (2) (Australia) Nathan Healey	(Russia) Dmitry Tursunov (Russia) Mikhail Youzhny	4–6, 6–3, 6–2
2006	(India) Mahesh Bhupathi (Croatia) Mario Ančić	(Germany) Michael Berrer (Denmark) Kenneth Carlsen	6–4, 6–3
2007	(South Africa) Rik de Voest (Australia) Ashley Fisher	(South Africa) Chris Haggard (Chinese Taipei) Lu Yen-hsun	6–7, 6–0, [10–6]
2008	(Australia) Stephen Huss (United Kingdom) Ross Hutchins	(Australia) Ashley Fisher (United States) Bobby Reynolds	7–5, 6–4
↓ ATP Tour 500 ↓
2009	(United States) Bob Bryan (United States) Mike Bryan	(The Bahamas) Mark Knowles (United States) Andy Roddick	6–4, 6–2
2010	(United States) Bob Bryan (2) (United States) Mike Bryan (2)	(Poland) Mariusz Fyrstenberg (Poland) Marcin Matkowski	6–1, 7–6^{(7–5)}
2011	(France) Michaël Llodra (Serbia) Nenad Zimonjić	(Sweden) Robert Lindstedt (Romania) Horia Tecău	7–6^{(7–2)}, 7–6^{(7–4)}
2012	(United States) Bob Bryan (3) (United States) Mike Bryan (3)	(Argentina) Carlos Berlocq (Uzbekistan) Denis Istomin	6–3, 6–2
2013	(Belarus) Max Mirnyi (Romania) Horia Tecău	(Italy) Fabio Fognini (Italy) Andreas Seppi	6–4, 6–2
2014	(Netherlands) Jean-Julien Rojer (Romania) Horia Tecău (2)	(France) Julien Benneteau (Canada) Vasek Pospisil	6–7^{(6–8)}, 7–5, [10–5]
2015	(Canada) Vasek Pospisil (United States) Jack Sock	(Canada) Daniel Nestor (France) Édouard Roger-Vasselin	3–6, 6–3, [10–6]
2016	(Spain) Pablo Carreño Busta (Spain) Rafael Nadal	(United States) Jack Sock (Australia) Bernard Tomic	6–7^{(6–8)}, 6–2, [10–8]
2017	(Finland) Henri Kontinen (Australia) John Peers	(United States) John Isner (United States) Jack Sock	6–3, 3–6, [10–7]
2018	(Poland) Łukasz Kubot (Brazil) Marcelo Melo	(Austria) Oliver Marach (Croatia) Mate Pavić	6–1, 6–4
2019	(Croatia) Ivan Dodig (Slovakia) Filip Polášek	(Poland) Łukasz Kubot (Brazil) Marcelo Melo	6–3, 7–6^{(7−4)}
2020– 2022	No competition (due to COVID-19 pandemic)		
2023	(Croatia) Ivan Dodig (2) (United States) Austin Krajicek	(Netherlands) Wesley Koolhof (United Kingdom) Neal Skupski	6–7^{(12–14)}, 6–3, [10–5]
2024	(Italy) Simone Bolelli (Italy) Andrea Vavassori	(Finland) Harri Heliövaara (United Kingdom) Henry Patten	4–6, 6–3, [10–5]
2025	(Finland) Harri Heliövaara (United Kingdom) Henry Patten	Karen Khachanov; Andrey Rublev	4–6, 6–3, [10–8]
2026	(United Kingdom) Julian Cash (United Kingdom) Lloyd Glasspool	(Netherlands) Sander Arends (Netherlands) David Pel	6–3, 3–6, [10–6]

== See also ==
- Tennis in China
