= 1994 Danamon Indonesia Women's Open – Singles =

Singles
- 1994 Danamon Indonesia Women's Open

Final
- Champion: (Indonesia) Yayuk Basuki
- Runner-up: (Argentina) Florencia Labat
- Score: 6–4, 3–6, 7–6^{(7–1)}

Details
- Draw: 32 (2WC/4Q/2LL)
- Seeds: 8

Events
Singles	Doubles
← 1993 ·	Danamon Open	· 1995 →

Yayuk Basuki was the defending champion and successfully defended her title, by defeating Florencia Labat 6–4, 3–6, 7–6^{(7–1)} in the final.

== Seeds ==
1. (Chinese Taipei) Wang Shi-ting (semifinals)
2. (Argentina) Florencia Labat (final)
3. (Indonesia) Yayuk Basuki (champion)
4. (Australia) Kristine Radford (semifinals)
5. (Australia) Rachel McQuillan (quarterfinals)
6. (France) ~~Sandrine Testud~~ (withdrew)
7. (Indonesia) Romana Tedjakusuma (first round)
8. (United States) Nicole Arendt (quarterfinals)

== Draw ==
=== Key ===
- Q = Qualifier
- WC = Wild card
- LL = Lucky loser
- Alt = Alternate
- ITF = ITF entry
- PR = Protected ranking
- SR = Special ranking
- SE = Special exempt
- JE = Junior exempt
- JR = Junior Accelerator Programme entrant
- CO = College Accelerator Programme entrant
- NG = Next Gen Accelerator Program entrant
- w/o = Walkover
- r = Retired
- d = Defaulted

=== Finals ===
Semifinals
1	(Chinese Taipei) Wang Shi-ting	2	7^{7}	3
3	(Indonesia) Yayuk Basuki	6	6^{5}	6
4	(Australia) Kristine Radford	7	6^{6}	3
2	(Argentina) Florencia Labat	5	7^{8}	6

Final
3	(Indonesia) Yayuk Basuki	6	3	7^{7}
2	(Argentina) Florencia Labat	4	6	6^{1}

=== Top half ===
First round
1	(Chinese Taipei) S-t Wang	6	6
(Netherlands) K de Weille	3	2
(United States) A Henricksson	0	5
LL	(Netherlands) L Niemantsverdriet	6	7
(Australia) R Stubbs	6	3	6
(Spain) C Torrens Valero	4	6	3
Q	(United States) J Ingram	1	1
LL	(Japan) N Miyagi	6	6
3	(Indonesia) Y Basuki	6	6
WC	(Indonesia) N Soetrisno	2	1
(Australia) K Godridge	6	6
(United States) E deLone	3	4
(South Africa) T Price	6	7^{7}
(Austria) B Paulus	2	6^{5}
Q	(France) A Dechaume-Balleret	2	3
8	(United States) N Arendt	6	6

Second round
1	(Chinese Taipei) S-t Wang	7^{7}	3
LL	(Netherlands) L Niemantsverdriet	6^{0}	1^{r}
(Australia) R Stubbs	5	5
LL	(Japan) N Miyagi	7	7
3	(Indonesia) Y Basuki	6^{6}	7^{7}	7
(Australia) K Godridge	7^{8}	6^{1}	5
(South Africa) T Price	4	2
8	(United States) N Arendt	6	6

Quarterfinals
1	(Chinese Taipei) S-t Wang	4	7	6
LL	(Japan) N Miyagi	6	5	1
3	(Indonesia) Y Basuki	6^{5}	7^{10}	6
8	(United States) N Arendt	7^{7}	6^{8}	3

Semifinals
1	(Chinese Taipei) S-t Wang	2	7^{7}	3
3	(Indonesia) Y Basuki	6	6^{5}	6

=== Bottom half ===
First round
5	(Australia) R McQuillan	6	6
LL	(Japan) H Nagano	2	3
(Australia) J Byrne	7^{8}	7
(Australia) M Jaggard-Lai	6^{6}	5
Q	(South Korea) M-r Jeon	2	3
(Czech Republic) A Strnadová	6	6
(Czech Republic) E Švíglerová	3	3
4	(Australia) K Radford	6	6
7	(Indonesia) R Tedjakusuma	2	2
(South Korea) S-h Park	6	6
WC	(Indonesia) M Chernovita	3	0
Q	(South Africa) D Van Rensburg	6	6
(Netherlands) P Kamstra	2	6	4
(Belgium) N Feber	6	4	6
(Japan) N Kijimuta	5	4
2	(Argentina) F Labat	7	6

Second round
5	(Australia) R McQuillan	2	6	6
(Australia) J Byrne	6	2	4
(Czech Republic) A Strnadová	7^{7}	3	3
4	(Australia) K Radford	6^{4}	6	6
(South Korea) S-h Park	6^{3}	2
Q	(South Africa) D Van Rensburg	7^{7}	6
(Belgium) N Feber	3	4
2	(Argentina) F Labat	6	6

Quarterfinals
5	(Australia) R McQuillan	6	6^{6}	3
4	(Australia) K Radford	4	7^{8}	6
Q	(South Africa) D Van Rensburg	2	1
2	(Argentina) F Labat	6	6

Semifinals
4	(Australia) K Radford	7	6^{6}	3
2	(Argentina) F Labat	5	7^{8}	6
