= 1995 Danamon Open – Doubles =

Doubles
- 1995 Danamon Open
- 1994 Champions: (United States) Nicole Arendt (Australia) Kristine Radford

Final
- Champions: (Germany) Claudia Porwik (Romania) Irina Spîrlea
- Runners-up: (Belgium) Laurence Courtois (Belgium) Nancy Feber
- Score: 6–2, 6–3

Details
- Draw: 28
- Seeds: 8

Events
Singles	Doubles
← 1994 ·	Danamon Open	· 1996 →

Nicole Arendt and Kristine Radford were the defending champions but did not compete that year.

Claudia Porwik and Irina Spîrlea won in the final 6–2, 6–3 against Laurence Courtois and Nancy Feber.

== Seeds ==
Champion seeds are indicated in bold text while text in italics indicates the round in which those seeds were eliminated. The top four seeded teams received byes into the second round.

1. (Indonesia) Yayuk Basuki / (Japan) Nana Miyagi (semifinals)
2. (Italy) Laura Golarsa / (Argentina) Mercedes Paz (second round)
3. (Australia) ~~Jenny Byrne~~ / (Australia) ~~Michelle Jaggard-Lai~~ (withdrew)
4. (Sweden) Maria Lindström / (Sweden) Maria Strandlund (semifinals)
5. (Ukraine) Olga Lugina / (Bulgaria) Elena Pampoulova (first round)
6. (Germany) Karin Kschwendt / (France) Noëlle van Lottum (first round)
7. (Belgium) Laurence Courtois / (Belgium) Nancy Feber (final)
8. (France) ~~Alexandra Fusai~~ / (South Africa) ~~Tessa Price~~ (withdrew)

== Draw ==
=== Key ===
- Q = Qualifier
- WC = Wild card
- LL = Lucky loser
- Alt = Alternate
- SE = Special exempt
- PR = Protected ranking
- ITF = ITF entry
- JE = Junior exempt
- w/o = Walkover
- r = Retired
- d = Defaulted
- SR = Special ranking

=== Final ===
Final
7	(Belgium) Laurence Courtois (Belgium) Nancy Feber	2	3
	(Germany) **Claudia Porwik** (Romania) **Irina Spîrlea**	**6**	**6**

=== Top half ===
First round
(France) A Olivier (Indonesia) N Soetrisno	1	6
(United States) **Ra Jensen** (United States) **Re Jensen**	**6**	**7**
(Germany) A Kerek (Germany) M Zivec-Skulj	**6**	4	3
(Japan) **M Miyauchi** (Czech Republic) **L Varmužová**	3	**6**	**6**
(Romania) **C Cristea** (Netherlands) **P Kamstra**	**6**	**7**
6	(Germany) K Kschwendt (France) N van Lottum	1	6
(Indonesia) **R Tedjakusuma** (Japan) **H Nagano**	5	**6**	**6**
Q	(Netherlands) Y Basting (Czech Republic) L Richterová	**7**	2	3
WC	(Indonesia) A Limanto (Indonesia) D Wijayanthi	1	3
(Slovenia) **T Križan** (Ukraine) **E Tatarkova**	**6**	**6**
WC	(Indonesia) M Chernovita (Indonesia) E Sulistyowati	3	6
7	(Belgium) **L Courtois** (Belgium) **N Feber**	**6**	**7**

Second round
1	(Indonesia) **Y Basuki** (Japan) **N Miyagi**	**6**	**6**
(United States) Ra Jensen (United States) Re Jensen	1	4
(Japan) M Miyauchi (Czech Republic) L Varmužová	1	1
(Romania) **C Cristea** (Netherlands) **P Kamstra**	**6**	**6**
LL	(United States) J Lee (United States) L Poruri	2	**6**	3
(Indonesia) **R Tedjakusuma** (Japan) **H Nagano**	**6**	3	**6**
(Slovenia) T Križan (Ukraine) E Tatarkova	6	2
7	(Belgium) **L Courtois** (Belgium) **N Feber**	**7**	**6**

Quarterfinals
1	(Indonesia) **Y Basuki** (Japan) **N Miyagi**	**6**	**7**
(Romania) C Cristea (Netherlands) P Kamstra	4	5
(Indonesia) R Tedjakusuma (Japan) H Nagano	4	2
7	(Belgium) **L Courtois** (Belgium) **N Feber**	**6**	**6**

Semifinals
1	(Indonesia) Y Basuki (Japan) N Miyagi
7	(Belgium) **L Courtois** (Belgium) **N Feber**	**w/o**

=== Bottom half ===
First round
LL	(Indonesia) **I Moerid** (Thailand) **T Tanasugarn**	**w/o**
(South Korea) I-S Kim (South Korea) S-H Park
(Netherlands) **M Koutstaal** (Belgium) **D Monami**	**6**	**6**
(Netherlands) C Bakkum (Japan) E Iida	1	4
(United States) K Brandi (United States) A Miller	3	4
(Chinese Taipei) **S-T Wang** (Japan) **Y Yoshida**	**6**	**6**
5	(Ukraine) O Lugina (Bulgaria) E Pampoulova	6	3
(Japan) **R Hiraki** (Argentina) **F Labat**	**7**	**6**
(Germany) **S Hack** (Germany) **C Schneider**	4	**6**	**6**
(United States) A Grossman (United States) J Steven	**6**	3	3
(Japan) H Mochizuki (Japan) Y Tanaka	4	**7**	3
(Germany) **C Porwik** (Romania) **I Spîrlea**	**6**	6	**6**

Second round
LL	(Indonesia) I Moerid (Thailand) T Tanasugarn	6	2
(Netherlands) **M Koutstaal** (Belgium) **D Monami**	**7**	**6**
(Chinese Taipei) S-T Wang (Japan) Y Yoshida	4	1
4	(Sweden) **M Lindström** (Sweden) **M Strandlund**	**6**	**6**
(Japan) **R Hiraki** (Argentina) **F Labat**	**6**	**6**
(Germany) S Hack (Germany) C Schneider	0	3
(Germany) **C Porwik** (Romania) **I Spîrlea**	**6**	3	**7**
2	(Italy) L Golarsa (Argentina) M Paz	4	**6**	6

Quarterfinals
(Netherlands) M Koutstaal (Belgium) D Monami	1	2
4	(Sweden) **M Lindström** (Sweden) **M Strandlund**	**6**	**6**
(Japan) R Hiraki (Argentina) F Labat	5	1
(Germany) **C Porwik** (Romania) **I Spîrlea**	**7**	**6**

Semifinals
4	(Sweden) M Lindström (Sweden) M Strandlund	3	1
(Germany) **C Porwik** (Romania) **I Spîrlea**	**6**	**6**
