= 1995 Danamon Open – Singles =

Singles
- 1995 Danamon Open
- 1994 Champion: (Indonesia) Yayuk Basuki

Final
- Champion: (Germany) Sabine Hack
- Runner-up: (Romania) Irina Spîrlea
- Score: 2–6, 7–6^{(8–6)}, 6–4

Details
- Draw: 56 (3WC/8Q/2LL)
- Seeds: 16

Events
Singles	Doubles
← 1994 ·	Danamon Open	· 1996 →

Yayuk Basuki was the defending champion but lost in the semifinals to Irina Spîrlea.

Sabine Hack won in the final 2–6, 7–6^{(8–6)}, 6–4 against Spîrlea.

== Seeds ==
A champion seed is indicated in bold text while text in italics indicates the round in which that seed was eliminated. The top eight seeds received a bye to the second round.

1. (Germany) **Sabine Hack (champion)**
2. (Indonesia) Yayuk Basuki (semifinals)
3. (United States) Ann Grossman (second round)
4. (Argentina) Florencia Labat (third round)
5. (Chinese Taipei) Shi-Ting Wang (quarterfinals)
6. (Romania) Irina Spîrlea (final)
7. (Japan) Nana Miyagi (quarterfinals)
8. (Bulgaria) Elena Pampoulova (second round)
9. (Austria) ~~Beate Reinstadler~~ (withdrew)
10. (France) Alexandra Fusai (second round)
11. (Netherlands) Stephanie Rottier (third round)
12. (Germany) Petra Begerow (first round)
13. (Germany) Karin Kschwendt (third round)
14. (South Korea) Sung-Hee Park (second round)
15. (Belgium) Laurence Courtois (first round)
16. (France) Noëlle van Lottum (second round)

== Draw ==
=== Key ===
- Q = Qualifier
- WC = Wild card
- LL = Lucky loser
- Alt = Alternate
- SE = Special exempt
- PR = Protected ranking
- ITF = ITF entry
- JE = Junior exempt
- w/o = Walkover
- r = Retired
- d = Defaulted
- SR = Special ranking

=== Finals ===
Semifinals
1	(Germany) **Sabine Hack**	**6**	**6**
(Sweden) Maria Strandlund	0	1
6	(Romania) **Irina Spîrlea**	3	**6**	0
2	(Indonesia) Yayuk Basuki	**6**	4	0^{r}

Final
1	(Germany) **Sabine Hack**	2	**7**	**6**
6	(Romania) Irina Spîrlea	**6**	6	4

=== Top half ===
==== Section 1 ====
First round
(Germany) **M Zivec-Skulj**	**6**	4	**6**
(Venezuela) M Vento	4	**6**	4
WC	(Indonesia) E Sulistyowati	2	3
(United States) **J Steven**	**6**	**6**
Q	(Ukraine) O Lugina	**6**	3	3
10	(France) **A Fusai**	3	**6**	**6**
13	(Germany) **K Kschwendt**	**6**	2
Q	(South Korea) I-S Kim	1	0^{r}
(Japan) H Nagano	4	2
(Czech Republic) **L Varmužová**	**6**	**6**
(Australia) J Byrne	1	0
(Canada) **J Nejedly**	**6**	**6**

Second round
1	(Germany) **S Hack**	**6**	**6**
(Germany) M Zivec-Skulj	4	3
(United States) **J Steven**	**6**	**6**
10	(France) A Fusai	3	2
13	(Germany) **K Kschwendt**	**7**	**6**
(Czech Republic) L Varmužová	6	2
(Canada) **J Nejedly**	**6**	**6**
8	(Bulgaria) E Pampoulova	3	4

Third round
1	(Germany) **S Hack**	**6**	**6**
(United States) J Steven	3	3
13	(Germany) K Kschwendt	1	4
(Canada) **J Nejedly**	**6**	**6**

Quarterfinals
1	(Germany) **S Hack**	**6**	**6**
(Canada) J Nejedly	2	4

==== Section 2 ====
First round
Q	(Japan) H Mochizuki	3	4
(Australia) **N Bradtke**	**6**	**6**
(Netherlands) Y Basting	**6**	3	2
(Italy) **M Grossi**	1	**6**	**6**
(Sweden) **M Strandlund**	**6**	**7**
15	(Belgium) L Courtois	2	6
11	(Netherlands) **S Rottier**	**6**	**6**
Q	(Netherlands) M Koutstaal	1	3
WC	(Indonesia) M Chernovita	**6**	3	4
LL	(United States) **K Brandi**	4	**6**	**6**
Q	(Thailand) **T Tanasugarn**	4	**7**	**6**
(Italy) L Golarsa	**6**	6	4

Second round
4	(Argentina) **F Labat**	2	**6**	**6**
(Australia) N Bradtke	**6**	2	4
(Italy) M Grossi	2	**7**	1
(Sweden) **M Strandlund**	**6**	6	**6**
11	(Netherlands) **S Rottier**	**6**	**6**
LL	(United States) K Brandi	4	2
Q	(Thailand) T Tanasugarn	1	3
5	(Chinese Taipei) **S-T Wang**	**6**	**6**

Third round
4	(Argentina) F Labat	4	**6**	5
(Sweden) **M Strandlund**	**6**	4	**7**
11	(Netherlands) S Rottier	**6**	3	4
5	(Chinese Taipei) **S-T Wang**	2	**6**	**6**

Quarterfinals
(Sweden) **M Strandlund**	**6**	4	**6**
5	(Chinese Taipei) S-T Wang	2	**6**	4

=== Bottom half ===
==== Section 3 ====
First round
(Japan) **R Hiraki**	**6**	**6**
Q	(Hungary) R Vidáts	4	3
(Belgium) **D Monami**	**6**	**6**
(Czech Republic) L Richterová	2	1
WC	(Indonesia) N Soetrisno	1	3
14	(South Korea) **S-H Park**	**6**	**6**
12	(Germany) P Begerow	3	2
(Argentina) **M Paz**	**6**	**6**
Q	(United States) **A Miller**	**6**	**6**
(Belgium) N Feber	0	3
(Slovenia) **T Križan**	**6**	**6**
(South Africa) D Van Rensburg	1	4

Second round
6	(Romania) **I Spîrlea**	**6**	**6**
(Japan) R Hiraki	1	2
(Belgium) **D Monami**	5	**6**	**6**
14	(South Korea) S-H Park	**7**	1	3
(Argentina) **M Paz**	**6**	**6**
Q	(United States) A Miller	3	1
(Slovenia) **T Križan**	4	**6**	**6**
3	(United States) A Grossman	**6**	0	0

Third round
6	(Romania) **I Spîrlea**	4	**6**	**6**
(Belgium) D Monami	**6**	2	2
(Argentina) M Paz	5	5
(Slovenia) **T Križan**	**7**	**7**

Quarterfinals
6	(Romania) **I Spîrlea**	**6**	**6**
(Slovenia) T Križan	2	1

==== Section 4 ====
First round
(Netherlands) **P Kamstra**	1	**6**	**6**
(Japan) Y Yoshida	**6**	4	3
(Japan) M Miyauchi	1	4
(Germany) **C Porwik**	**6**	**6**
(South Africa) T Price	5	**7**	1/r
16	(France) **N van Lottum**	**7**	5	**2**
LL	(Japan) **E Iida**	**6**	**6**
Q	(Ukraine) E Tatarkova	4	2
(Indonesia) **R Tedjakusuma**	**6**	**6**
(Netherlands) K de Weille	2	0
(United States) L Poruri	4	4
(Romania) **C Cristea**	**6**	**6**

Second round
7	(Japan) **N Miyagi**	**7**	**6**
(Netherlands) P Kamstra	6	3
(Germany) **C Porwik**	**7**	**6**
16	(France) N van Lottum	5	3
LL	(Japan) **E Iida**	**7**	**6**
(Indonesia) R Tedjakusuma	6	4
(Romania) C Cristea	4	3
2	(Indonesia) **Y Basuki**	**6**	**6**

Third round
7	(Japan) **N Miyagi**	**6**	0	**6**
(Germany) C Porwik	1	**6**	1
LL	(Japan) E Iida	3	1
2	(Indonesia) **Y Basuki**	**6**	**6**

Quarterfinals
7	(Japan) N Miyagi	5	**6**	4
2	(Indonesia) **Y Basuki**	**7**	1	**6**
