= 1993 Indonesian Women's Open Tennis Championships – Singles =

Singles
- 1993 Indonesian Women's Open Tennis Championships

Final
- Champion: (Indonesia) Yayuk Basuki
- Runner-up: (United States) Ann Grossman
- Score: 6–4, 6–4

Details
- Draw: 32 (2WC/4Q)
- Seeds: 8

Events
Singles	Doubles
Danamon Open	· 1994 →

In the first edition of the tournament, Yayuk Basuki won the title by defeating Ann Grossman 6–4, 6–4 in the final.

== Seeds ==
1. (Indonesia) Yayuk Basuki (champion)
2. (United States) Ann Grossman (final)
3. (United States) Nicole Arendt (semifinals)
4. (Australia) Michelle Jaggard-Lai (semifinals)
5. (Japan) Kyōko Nagatsuka (first round)
6. (Germany) Claudia Porwik (second round)
7. (Netherlands) Kristie Boogert (quarterfinals)
8. (Slovakia) Katarína Studeníková (quarterfinals)

== Draw ==
=== Key ===
- Q = Qualifier
- WC = Wild card
- LL = Lucky loser
- Alt = Alternate
- SE = Special exempt
- PR = Protected ranking
- ITF = ITF entry
- JE = Junior exempt
- w/o = Walkover
- r = Retired
- d = Defaulted
- SR = Special ranking

=== Finals ===
Semifinals
1	(Indonesia) Yayuk Basuki	6	4	6
3	(United States) Nicole Arendt	4	6	4
4	(Australia) Michelle Jaggard-Lai	0	0
2	(United States) Ann Grossman	6	6

Final
1	(Indonesia) Yayuk Basuki	6	6
2	(United States) Ann Grossman	4	4

=== Top half ===
First round
1	(Indonesia) Y Basuki	6	6
(South Korea) S-h Park	0	2
Q	(Kazakhstan) E Likhovtseva	6	6
(Australia) J Byrne	2	3
(Czech Republic) E Švíglerová	6	4	4
(Japan) M Yanagi	2	6	6
Q	(United States) C MacGregor	5	2
7	(Netherlands) K Boogert	7	6
3	(United States) N Arendt	4	6	6
(Australia) T Morton	6	3	1
(Australia) K Radford	2	2
(Romania) R Dragomir	6	6
Q	(Australia) JA Faull	3	5
Q	(Netherlands) L Niemantsverdriet	6	7
(Finland) P Thorén	6^{6}	2
(Germany) C Porwik	7^{8}	6

Second round
1	(Indonesia) Y Basuki	6	6
Q	(Kazakhstan) E Likhovtseva	1	2
(Japan) M Yanagi	7	2	3
7	(Netherlands) K Boogert	5	6	6
3	(United States) N Arendt	6	6
(Romania) R Dragomir	2	1
Q	(Netherlands) L Niemantsverdriet	4	6	7
(Germany) C Porwik	6	1	5

Quarterfinals
1	(Indonesia) Y Basuki	6	7
7	(Netherlands) K Boogert	2	5
3	(United States) N Arendt	1	6	6
Q	(Netherlands) L Niemantsverdriet	6	2	4

Semifinals
1	(Indonesia) Y Basuki	6	4	6
3	(United States) N Arendt	4	6	4

=== Bottom half ===
First round
(Japan) K Nagatsuka	6	2	1
(Australia) K Godridge	2	6	6
(Belgium) S Wasserman	6	6
(Netherlands) M Kiene	1	3
WC	(Indonesia) J Sutedja	6	2	3
(France) K Quentrec	4	6	6
(Germany) A Kerek	2	0
4	(Australia) M Jaggard-Lai	6	6
8	(Slovakia) K Studeníková	6	2
(New Zealand) J Richardson	3	0^{r}
WC	(Indonesia) R Tedjakusuma	7^{7}	6
(United States) E deLone	6^{5}	3
(Japan) A Sugiyama	4	2
(United Kingdom) M Javer	6	6
(Japan) N Miyagi	6^{9}	3
2	(United States) A Grossman	7^{11}	6

Second round
(Australia) K Godridge	7	2	6
(Belgium) S Wasserman	5	6	4
(France) K Quentrec	3	6^{4}
4	(Australia) M Jaggard-Lai	6	7^{7}
8	(Slovakia) K Studeníková	6	7
WC	(Indonesia) R Tedjakusuma	2	5
(United Kingdom) M Javer	1	6	3
2	(United States) A Grossman	6	2	6

Quarterfinals
(Australia) K Godridge	3	7	0
4	(Australia) M Jaggard-Lai	6	5	6
8	(Slovakia) K Studeníková	3	4
2	(United States) A Grossman	6	6

Semifinals
4	(Australia) M Jaggard-Lai	0	0
2	(United States) A Grossman	6	6
