= 1994 Danamon Indonesia Women's Open – Doubles =

Doubles
- 1994 Danamon Indonesia Women's Open

Final
- Champions: (United States) Nicole Arendt (Australia) Kristine Radford
- Runners-up: (Australia) Kerry-Anne Guse (Czech Republic) Andrea Strnadová
- Score: 6–2, 6–2

Details
- Draw: 16
- Seeds: 4

Events
Singles	Doubles
← 1993 ·	Danamon Open	· 1995 →

Nicole Arendt and Kristine Radford were the defending champions and successfully defended their title, by defeating Kerry-Anne Guse and Andrea Strnadová 6–2, 6–2 in the final.

== Seeds ==
1. (Indonesia) Yayuk Basuki / (Japan) Nana Miyagi (semifinals)
2. (Australia) Jenny Byrne / (Australia) Rachel McQuillan (semifinals)
3. (United States) Nicole Arendt / (Australia) Kristine Radford (champions)
4. (Australia) Kerry-Anne Guse / (Czech Republic) Andrea Strnadová (final)

== Draw ==
=== Key ===
- Q = Qualifier
- WC = Wild card
- LL = Lucky loser
- Alt = Alternate
- SE = Special exempt
- PR = Protected ranking
- ITF = ITF entry
- JE = Junior exempt
- w/o = Walkover
- r = Retired
- d = Defaulted
- SR = Special ranking

=== Draw ===
First round
1	(Indonesia) Y Basuki (Japan) N Miyagi	6	6
WC	(Indonesia) R Tedjakusuma (Indonesia) N Soetrisno	4	4
(France) A Dechaume-Balleret (Argentina) F Labat	6	6
LL	(Indonesia) L Andriyani (Indonesia) M Chernovita	0	0
4	(Australia) KA Guse (Czech Republic) A Strnadová	7^{7}	6
(Australia) D Jones (South Africa) T Price	6^{4}	2
(Australia) L Field (United States) A Henricksson	0	6^{4}
(Japan) E Iida (Australia) T Morton-Rodgers	6	7^{7}
(Japan) Y Kamio (Japan) N Kijimuta	6	6
(South Africa) M Joubert (United States) S Reece	3	1
Q	(South Korea) S-h Park (Chinese Taipei) S-t Wang	6	4	4
3	(United States) N Arendt (Australia) K Radford	4	6	6
LL	(Netherlands) P Kamstra (Netherlands) L Niemantsverdriet	7	6
(Canada) M Bernard (Canada) C Delisle	5	2
(United States) E deLone (Australia) N Pratt	4	1
2	(Australia) J Byrne (Australia) R McQuillan	6	6

Quarterfinals
1	(Indonesia) Y Basuki (Japan) N Miyagi	6	6
(France) A Dechaume-Balleret (Argentina) F Labat	1	4
4	(Australia) KA Guse (Czech Republic) A Strnadová	6	6
(Japan) E Iida (Australia) T Morton-Rodgers	3	4
(Japan) Y Kamio (Japan) N Kijimuta	0	2
3	(United States) N Arendt (Australia) K Radford	6	6
LL	(Netherlands) P Kamstra (Netherlands) L Niemantsverdriet	d
2	(Australia) J Byrne (Australia) R McQuillan

Semifinals
1	(Indonesia) Y Basuki (Japan) N Miyagi	6^{6}	2
4	(Australia) KA Guse (Czech Republic) A Strnadová	7^{8}	6
3	(United States) N Arendt (Australia) K Radford	6	6
2	(Australia) J Byrne (Australia) R McQuillan	3	4

Final
4	(Australia) KA Guse (Czech Republic) A Strnadová	2	2
3	(United States) N Arendt (Australia) K Radford	6	6
