= 1993 Indonesian Women's Open Tennis Championships – Doubles =

Doubles
- 1993 Indonesian Women's Open Tennis Championships

Final
- Champions: (United States) Nicole Arendt; (Australia) Kristine Radford
- Runners-up: (United States) Amy deLone; (United States) Erika deLone
- Score: 6–3, 6–4

Details
- Draw: 16
- Seeds: 4

Events
Singles	Doubles
Danamon Open	· 1994 →

In the first edition of the tournament, Nicole Arendt and Kristine Radford won the title by defeating Amy deLone and Erika deLone 6–2, 6–2 in the final.

== Seeds ==
1. (Indonesia) Yayuk Basuki / (Japan) Nana Miyagi (semifinals)
2. (Australia) Jo-Anne Faull / (Australia) Angie Woolcock (quarterfinals)
3. (Netherlands) Monique Kiene / (Mexico) Lupita Novelo (first round)
4. (United States) Nicole Arendt / (Australia) Kristine Radford (champions)

== Draw ==
=== Key ===
- Q = Qualifier
- WC = Wild card
- LL = Lucky loser
- Alt = Alternate
- SE = Special exempt
- PR = Protected ranking
- ITF = ITF entry
- JE = Junior exempt
- w/o = Walkover
- r = Retired
- d = Defaulted
- SR = Special ranking

=== Draw ===
First round

Quarterfinals

Semifinals

Final

1
(Indonesia) Y Basuki
(Japan) N Miyagi
6
4
6

Q
- (Indonesia) N Soetrisno
- (Indonesia) J Sutedja
1
6
1

1
(Indonesia) Y Basuki
(Japan) N Miyagi
6
7^{7}

- (South Korea) S-h Park
- (Japan) A Sugiyama
5
6
3

- (United States) A Grossman
- (Australia) N Pratt
3
6^{2}

(United States) A Grossman
(Australia) N Pratt
7
4
6

1
- (Indonesia) Y Basuki
- (Japan) N Miyagi
3
6
2

4
(United States) N Arendt
(Australia) K Radford
7^{7}
6

4
(United States) N Arendt
(Australia) K Radford
6
4
6

- (Australia) K Godridge
- (Australia) T Morton
6^{3}
2

4
(United States) N Arendt
(Australia) K Radford
6
6

(Germany) A Kerek
(Czech Republic) E Švíglerová
6
6

- (Germany) A Kerek
- (Czech Republic) E Švíglerová
2
2

- (Indonesia) Pingkan Lumenta
- (Indonesia) M-V Widyadharma
2
2

4
(United States) N Arendt
(Australia) K Radford
6
6

- (Japan) H Nagano
- (Japan) K Nagatsuka
2
4

Q
- (United States) A deLone
- (United States) E deLone
3
4

(Australia) J Byrne
(Australia) K McDonald
6
6

(Australia) J Byrne
(Australia) K McDonald
6
6

(Slovakia) K Studeníková
(Finland) P Thorén
6
7

- (Slovakia) K Studeníková
- (Finland) P Thorén
3
4

3
- (Netherlands) M Kiene
- (Mexico) L Novelo
0
5

- (Australia) J Byrne
- (Australia) K McDonald
6
1
6^{4}

- (Indonesia) R Tedjakusuma
- (Indonesia) S Wibowo
5
4

Q
(United States) A deLone
(United States) E deLone
3
6
7^{7}

Q
(United States) A deLone
(United States) E deLone
7
6

Q
(United States) A deLone
(United States) E deLone
2
6
6

- (Japan) M Yanagi
- (Japan) M Yokobori
3
2

2
- (Australia) JA Faull
- (Australia) A Woolcock
6
4
2

2
(Australia) JA Faull
(Australia) A Woolcock
6
6
