= 1993 Indonesian Women's Open Tennis Championships =

- Date: 26 April – 2 May
- Edition: 1st
- Category: Tier IV
- Draw: 32S / 16D
- Prize money: $100,000
- Surface: Hard / outdoor
- Location: Jakarta, Indonesia
- Venue: Gelora Senayan Stadium

Champions

Singles
- (Indonesia) Yayuk Basuki

Doubles
- (United States) Nicole Arendt / (Australia) Kristine Radford
Danamon Open	· 1994 →

The 1993 Indonesian Women's Open Tennis Championships was a women's tennis tournament played on outdoor hard courts at the Gelora Senayan Stadium in Jakarta, Indonesia and was part of Tier IV of the 1993 WTA Tour. It was the inaugural edition of the tournament and was held from 26 April through 2 May 1993. First-seeded Yayuk Basuki won the singles title and earned $18,000 first-prize money.

== Finals ==
=== Singles ===
(Indonesia) Yayuk Basuki defeated (United States) Ann Grossman 6–4, 6–4

- It was Basuki's 2nd singles title of the year and the 4th and last of her career.

=== Doubles ===
(United States) Nicole Arendt / (Australia) Kristine Radford defeated (United States) Amy deLone / (United States) Erika deLone 6–3, 6–4

- It was Arendt's first doubles title her career. It was Radford's first doubles title of her career.
