= 1994 Danamon Indonesia Women's Open =

- Date: 25 April – 1 May
- Edition: 2nd
- Category: Tier IV
- Draw: 32S / 16D
- Prize money: $100,000
- Surface: Hard / outdoor
- Location: Jakarta, Indonesia
- Venue: Gelora Senayan Stadium

Champions

Singles
- (Indonesia) Yayuk Basuki

Doubles
- (United States) Nicole Arendt / (Australia) Kristine Radford
← 1993 ·	Danamon Open	· 1995 →

The 1994 Danamon Indonesia Open was a women's tennis tournament played on outdoor hard courts at the Gelora Senayan Stadium in Jakarta, Indonesia and was part of Tier IV of the 1994 WTA Tour. It was the second edition of the tournament and was held from 25 April through 1 May 1994. Third-seeded Yayuk Basuki won the singles title and earned $18,000 first-prize money.

== Finals ==
=== Singles ===
(Indonesia) Yayuk Basuki defeated (Argentina) Florencia Labat 6–4, 3–6, 7–6^{(7–1)}

- It was Basuki's 2nd singles title of the year and the 6th and last of her career.

=== Doubles ===
(United States) Nicole Arendt / (Australia) Kristine Radford defeated (Australia) Kerry-Anne Guse / (Czech Republic) Andrea Strnadová 6–2, 6–2

- It was Arendt's only doubles title of the year and the 2nd of her career. It was Radford's only doubles title of the year and the 2nd of her career.
