= 1993 US Open – Women's doubles =

Women's doubles
- 1993 US Open

Final
- Champions: (Spain) Arantxa Sánchez Vicario (Czech Republic) Helena Suková
- Runners-up: (South Africa) Amanda Coetzer (Argentina) Inés Gorrochategui
- Score: 6–4, 6–2

Details
- Draw: 64 (3 WC )
- Seeds: 16

Events
Singles	men	women		boys	girls
Doubles	men	women	mixed	boys	girls
WC Singles	men	women	quad
WC Doubles	men	women	quad
Legends	men	women	mixed
← 1992 ·	US Open	· 1994 →

Arantxa Sánchez Vicario and Helena Suková won in the final 6–4, 6–2 against Amanda Coetzer and Inés Gorrochategui.

Gigi Fernández and Natasha Zvereva were the defending champions but lost in the semifinals to Sánchez Vicario and Suková. With this loss, they missed out on the 1993 Calendar Grand Slam in Women's Doubles, as well as ended their streak of 6 consecutive grand slam Women’s Doubles titles won from the 1992 French Open to 1993 Wimbledon.

== Seeds ==
Champion seeds are indicated in bold text while text in italics indicates the round in which those seeds were eliminated.

1. (United States) Gigi Fernández / (Belarus) Natasha Zvereva (semifinals)
2. (Latvia) Larisa Neiland / (Czech Republic) Jana Novotná (third round)
3. (Spain) **Arantxa Sánchez Vicario** / (Czech Republic) **Helena Suková (champions)**
4. (United States) Lori McNeil / (Australia) Rennae Stubbs (quarterfinals)
5. (United States) Pam Shriver / (Australia) Elizabeth Smylie (third round)
6. n/a
7. (Canada) Jill Hetherington / (United States) Kathy Rinaldi (second round)
8. (United States) Katrina Adams / (Netherlands) Manon Bollegraf (third round)
9. (South Africa) Amanda Coetzer / (Argentina) Inés Gorrochategui (final)
10. (Italy) Sandra Cecchini / (Argentina) Patricia Tarabini (quarterfinals)
11. (United States) Patty Fendick / (United States) Meredith McGrath (third round)
12. (Bulgaria) Magdalena Maleeva / (Switzerland) Manuela Maleeva-Fragnière (first round)
13. (Russia) Eugenia Maniokova / (Georgia (country)) Leila Meskhi (second round)
14. (United States) Debbie Graham / (Netherlands) Brenda Schultz (third round)
15. (South Africa) Elna Reinach / (New Zealand) Julie Richardson (quarterfinals)
16. (Argentina) Mercedes Paz / (Netherlands) Caroline Vis (first round)

== Draw ==
=== Key ===
- Q = Qualifier
- WC = Wild card
- LL = Lucky loser
- Alt = Alternate
- ITF = ITF entry
- PR = Protected ranking
- SR = Special ranking
- SE = Special exempt
- JE = Junior exempt
- JR = Junior Accelerator Programme entrant
- CO = College Accelerator Programme entrant
- NG = Next Gen Accelerator Program entrant
- w/o = Walkover
- r = Retired
- d = Defaulted

=== Finals ===
Semifinals
1	(United States) Gigi Fernández (Belarus) Natasha Zvereva	6	3	4
3	(Spain) Arantxa Sánchez Vicario (Czech Republic) Helena Suková	1	6	6
9	(South Africa) Amanda Coetzer (Argentina) Inés Gorrochategui	6	6
(Indonesia) Yayuk Basuki (Japan) Nana Miyagi	3	2

Final
3	(Spain) Arantxa Sánchez Vicario (Czech Republic) Helena Suková	6	6
9	(South Africa) Amanda Coetzer (Argentina) Inés Gorrochategui	4	2

=== Top half ===
==== Section 1 ====
First round
1	(United States) G Fernández (Belarus) N Zvereva	7	6
(United Kingdom) V Lake (United Kingdom) C Wood	6	2
(Netherlands) I Driehuis (Mexico) L Novelo	6	6	6
(United States) S McCarthy (United States) K Po	7	3	0
(United States) L Allen (United States) A Henricksson	2	2
(Argentina) F Labat (Germany) B Rittner	6	6
(United States) E Hakami (United States) S Reece	4	4
14	(United States) D Graham (Netherlands) B Schultz	6	6
10	(Italy) S Cecchini (Argentina) P Tarabini	6	6
(United States) L Davenport (United States) M Werdel	4	4
WC	(United States) A Creek (United Kingdom) M Oldham	2	3
(Australia) N Provis (United States) L Raymond	6	6
(United States) C MacGregor (United States) S Stafford	6	6
(Sweden) M Lindström (Sweden) M Strandlund	2	4
(France) P Paradis-Mangon (France) S Testud	1	1
5	(United States) P Shriver (Australia) E Smylie	6	6

Second round
1	(United States) G Fernández (Belarus) N Zvereva	7	6
(Netherlands) I Driehuis (Mexico) L Novelo	6	1
(Argentina) F Labat (Germany) B Rittner	7	3	6
14	(United States) D Graham (Netherlands) B Schultz	5	6	7
10	(Italy) S Cecchini (Argentina) P Tarabini	2	6	6
(Australia) N Provis (United States) L Raymond	6	4	3
(United States) C MacGregor (United States) S Stafford	6	4
5	(United States) P Shriver (Australia) E Smylie	7	6

Third round
1	(United States) G Fernández (Belarus) N Zvereva	6	6
14	(United States) D Graham (Netherlands) B Schultz	2	3
10	(Italy) S Cecchini (Argentina) P Tarabini	6	7
5	(United States) P Shriver (Australia) E Smylie	3	6

Quarterfinals
1	(United States) G Fernández (Belarus) N Zvereva	6	6
10	(Italy) S Cecchini (Argentina) P Tarabini	4	4

==== Section 2 ====
First round
3	(Spain) A Sánchez Vicario (Czech Republic) H Suková	6	6
(Croatia) I Majoli (United States) B Nagelsen	3	0
(United States) M L Daniels (United States) G Magers	6	7
(Slovakia) K Habšudová (Netherlands) N Muns-Jagerman	2	6
(Czech Republic) R Bobková (Czech Republic) P Langrová	6	7
(France) N van Lottum (Australia) A Woolcock	3	5
(France) J Halard (Germany) A Huber	1	7	5
11	(United States) P Fendick (United States) M McGrath	6	6	7
15	(South Africa) E Reinach (New Zealand) J Richardson	6	6
(United States) J Emmons (South Africa) T Price	4	0
WC	(United States) J Steven (United States) T Whitlinger	4	6	2
(Ukraine) E Brioukhovets (Ukraine) N Medvedeva	6	4	6
WC	(United States) C Moros (United States) S Nickitas	4	3
(Bulgaria) K Maleeva (France) N Tauziat	6	6
(France) A Fusai (Argentina) M J Gaidano	4	6
8	(United States) K Adams (Netherlands) M Bollegraf	6	7

Second round
3	(Spain) A Sánchez Vicario (Czech Republic) H Suková	6	6
(United States) M L Daniels (United States) G Magers	3	1
(Czech Republic) R Bobková (Czech Republic) P Langrová	1	1
11	(United States) P Fendick (United States) M McGrath	6	6
15	(South Africa) E Reinach (New Zealand) J Richardson	6	6
(Ukraine) E Brioukhovets (Ukraine) N Medvedeva	4	0
(Bulgaria) K Maleeva (France) N Tauziat	2	4
8	(United States) K Adams (Netherlands) M Bollegraf	6	6

Third round
3	(Spain) A Sánchez Vicario (Czech Republic) H Suková	6	5	6
11	(United States) P Fendick (United States) M McGrath	3	7	4
15	(South Africa) E Reinach (New Zealand) J Richardson	6	4	6
8	(United States) K Adams (Netherlands) M Bollegraf	0	6	2

Quarterfinals
3	(Spain) A Sánchez Vicario (Czech Republic) H Suková	6	6
15	(South Africa) E Reinach (New Zealand) J Richardson	3	3

=== Bottom half ===
==== Section 3 ====
First round
ALT	(France) I Demongeot (United States) R White	7	3	6
(United States) A Frazier (Japan) R Hiraki	5	6	7
(Belgium) D Monami (Germany) M Zivec-Skulj	3	0
(Netherlands) M Oremans (Czech Republic) A Strnadová	6	6
(Japan) Y Kamio (Japan) K Nagatsuka	6	6	2
(United Kingdom) J Durie (United States) G Helgeson	7	3	6
(Japan) E Iida (Japan) M Kidowaki	7	3	1
9	(South Africa) A Coetzer (Argentina) I Gorrochategui	5	6	6
16	(Argentina) M Paz (Netherlands) C Vis	3	6	3
(Australia) R McQuillan (Germany) C Porwik	6	4	6
(Germany) W Probst (Germany) C Singer	1	1
(Italy) S Farina (Italy) L Ferrando	6	6
(Romania) R Dragomir (Slovakia) J Husárová	7	6	1
(Japan) K Date (Slovakia) R Zrubáková	5	7	6
(United States) A Keller (Australia) N Pratt	3	4
4	(United States) L McNeil (Australia) R Stubbs	6	6

Second round
(United States) A Frazier (Japan) R Hiraki	6	6
(Netherlands) M Oremans (Czech Republic) A Strnadová	2	2
(United Kingdom) J Durie (United States) G Helgeson	6	3	6
9	(South Africa) A Coetzer (Argentina) I Gorrochategui	2	6	7
(Australia) R McQuillan (Germany) C Porwik	6	3	6
(Italy) S Farina (Italy) L Ferrando	1	6	3
(Japan) K Date (Slovakia) R Zrubáková	1	4
4	(United States) L McNeil (Australia) R Stubbs	6	6

Third round
(United States) A Frazier (Japan) R Hiraki	4	3
9	(South Africa) A Coetzer (Argentina) I Gorrochategui	6	6
(Australia) R McQuillan (Germany) C Porwik	6	6	4
4	(United States) L McNeil (Australia) R Stubbs	7	4	6

Quarterfinals
9	(South Africa) A Coetzer (Argentina) I Gorrochategui	6	5	7
4	(United States) L McNeil (Australia) R Stubbs	2	7	5

==== Section 4 ====
First round
7	(Canada) J Hetherington (United States) K Rinaldi	6	6
(Peru) L Gildemeister (United States) H Ludloff	3	3
(Indonesia) Y Basuki (Japan) N Miyagi	6	7
(United States) A Grossman (Canada) P Hy	1	5
(Italy) L Golarsa (France) C Suire	5	6
(Australia) M Jaggard-Lai (Canada) R Simpson-Alter	7	7
(South Africa) R Nideffer (United States) C Rubin	3	6	2
13	(Russia) E Maniokova (Georgia (country)) L Meskhi	6	1	6
12	(Bulgaria) M Maleeva (Switzerland) M Maleeva-Fragnière	2	r
(United States) A deLone (United States) E deLone	1
(Australia) L Field (Germany) K Kschwendt	7	6
(United States) B Bowes (United States) P O'Reilly	6	3
(United States) N Arendt (Australia) K Radford	6	6	3
(United States) S Collins (South Africa) M de Swardt	3	7	6
(United States) L Harvey-Wild (Austria) J Wiesner	2	2
2	(Latvia) L Neiland (Czech Republic) J Novotná	6	6

Second round
7	(Canada) J Hetherington (United States) K Rinaldi	6	7	3
(Indonesia) Y Basuki (Japan) N Miyagi	7	5	6
(Australia) M Jaggard-Lai (Canada) R Simpson-Alter	6	4	6
13	(Russia) E Maniokova (Georgia (country)) L Meskhi	4	6	2
(United States) A deLone (United States) E deLone	6	1
(Australia) L Field (Germany) K Kschwendt	7	6
(United States) S Collins (South Africa) M de Swardt	4	6	6
2	(Latvia) L Neiland (Czech Republic) J Novotná	6	2	1

Third round
(Indonesia) Y Basuki (Japan) N Miyagi	3	6	6
(Australia) M Jaggard-Lai (Canada) R Simpson-Alter	6	1	3
(Australia) L Field (Germany) K Kschwendt	2	4
(United States) S Collins (South Africa) M de Swardt	6	6

Quarterfinals
(Indonesia) Y Basuki (Japan) N Miyagi	7	6
(United States) S Collins (South Africa) M de Swardt	6	2
