= 1995 Danamon Indonesia Open =

1995 Danamon Open
- Date: 2–8 January
- Edition: 3rd
- Category: Tier III
- Draw: 56S / 28D
- Prize money: $161,250
- Surface: Hard / outdoor
- Location: Jakarta, Indonesia
- Venue: Gelora Senayan Stadium

Champions

Singles
- (Germany) Sabine Hack

Doubles
- (Germany) Claudia Porwik / (Romania) Irina Spîrlea
← 1994 ·	Danamon Open	· 1996 →

The 1995 Danamon Indonesia Open was a women's tennis tournament played on outdoor hard courts at the Gelora Senayan Stadium in Jakarta, Indonesia and was part of Tier III of the 1995 WTA Tour. It was the third edition of the tournament and was held from 2 January through 8 January 1995. First-seeded Sabine Hack won the singles title and earned $26,500 first-prize money.

== Finals ==
=== Singles ===
(Germany) Sabine Hack defeated (Romania) Irina Spîrlea 2–6, 7–6^{(8–6)}, 6–4

- It was Hack's only singles title of the year and the 4th and last of her career.

=== Doubles ===
(Germany) Claudia Porwik / (Romania) Irina Spîrlea defeated (Belgium) Laurence Courtois / (Belgium) Nancy Feber 6–2, 6–3

- It was Porwik's 1st title of the year and the 5th of her career. It was Spîrlea's 1st title of the year and the 3rd of her career.
