= Maaike Koutstaal =

Dutch tennis player

- Full name: Maaike Koutstaal
- Country (sports): Netherlands
- Born: 20 June 1975 (age 49); Rotterdam, Netherlands
- Prize money: $76,974

Singles
- Career record: 152–152
- Career titles: 1 ITF
- Highest ranking: No. 189 (24 April 1995)

Doubles
- Career record: 103–78
- Career titles: 9 ITF
- Highest ranking: No. 86 (30 October 1995)

Grand Slam doubles results
- Australian Open: 1R (1995)
- French Open: 2R (1995)
- Wimbledon: 3R (1995)
- US Open: 1R (1995)

Maaike Koutstaal (born 20 June 1975) is a former professional tennis player from the Netherlands.

== Biography ==
Born in Rotterdam, Koutstaal competed on the ITF junior circuit in the early 1990s and most notably was runner-up in the girls' doubles at the 1993 French Open.

As a professional player she was most successful in the doubles format, with a best ranking of 86 in the world.

Her best performance on the WTA Tour came at the 1995 Indonesia Open, where she qualified for the singles main draw and was a quarterfinalist in the doubles, partnering Dominique Monami.

In 1995, she competed in the main draw of the women's doubles at all four Grand Slam tournaments, which included a round of 16 appearance at the Wimbledon Championships.

== ITF finals ==
$25,000 tournaments
$10,000 tournaments

=== Singles (1–3) ===
Result	No.	Date	Tournament	Surface	Opponent	Score
Loss	1.	29 May 1994	Barcelona, Spain	Clay	(Paraguay) Larissa Schaerer	7–6, 3–6, 3–6
Win	1.	18 July 1994	Bilbao, Spain	Clay	(France) Catherine Mothes-Jobkel	6–3, 6–1
Loss	2.	13 October 1996	Nicosia, Cyprus	Clay	(Czech Republic) Eva Krejčová	2–6, 6–7
Loss	3.	17 May 1998	Le Touquet, France	Clay	(Poland) Katarzyna Nowak	6–7, 2–6

=== Doubles (9–8) ===
Result	No.	Date	Tournament	Surface	Partner	Opponents	Score
Win	1.	15 February 1993	Amadora, Portugal	Hard	(Netherlands) Lara Bitter	(Bulgaria) Virág Csurgó (Bulgaria) Teodora Nedeva	6–0, 3–6, 6–2
Win	2.	22 February 1993	Lisbon, Portugal	Hard	(Netherlands) Linda Niemantsverdriet	(Netherlands) Lara Bitter (Netherlands) Kim de Weille	6–4, 6–3
Loss	1.	22 November 1993	Nuriootpa, Australia	Hard	(Australia) Melissa Beadman	(United States) Susan Gilchrist (United States) Vickie Paynter	6–7, 2–6
Win	3.	20 February 1994	Newcastle, England	Carpet (i)	(Netherlands) Linda Niemantsverdriet	(Republic of Ireland) Karen Nugent (United Kingdom) Joanne Ward	2–6, 7–5, 6–2
Win	4.	13 March 1994	Prostějov, Czech Republic	Hard	(Netherlands) Lara Bitter	(Czech Republic) Květa Peschke (Czech Republic) Jana Pospíšilová	7–5, 6–3
Loss	2.	28 May 1994	Barcelona, Spain	Clay	(Australia) Kirrily Sharpe	(Spain) Eva Bes (Spain) Silvia Ramón-Cortés	1–6, 3–6
Win	5.	3 July 1994	Vaihingen, Germany	Hard	(Netherlands) Lara Bitter	(Australia) Nicole Pratt (Australia) Kirrily Sharpe	6–1, 6–2
Loss	3.	29 August 1994	Istanbul, Turkey	Hard	(Netherlands) Carin Bakkum	(Czech Republic) Petra Kučová (Czech Republic) Lenka Němečková	2–6, 3–6
Loss	4.	17 June 1995	Getxo, Spain	Clay	(Netherlands) Seda Noorlander	(Poland) Magdalena Grzybowska (Argentina) María Fernanda Landa	2–6, 4–6
Win	6.	17 November 1996	Cairo, Egypt	Clay	(Netherlands) Andrea van den Hurk	(Slovenia) Katarina Srebotnik (South Africa) Jessica Steck	w/o
Loss	5.	18 January 1997	Helsinki, Finland	Hard (i)	(Russia) Anna Linkova	(Czech Republic) Olga Blahotová (Czech Republic) Gabriela Navrátilová	2–6, 1–6
Loss	6.	7 September 1997	Bad Nauheim, Germany	Clay	(Netherlands) Debby Haak	(Sweden) Annica Lindstedt (Argentina) Luciana Masante	2–6, 2–6
Win	7.	22 November 1997	Jaffa, Israel	Hard	(Israel) Nataly Cahana	(Israel) Tzipora Obziler (Israel) Anna Smashnova	6–2, 6–1
Win	8.	6 September 1998	Sofia, Bulgaria	Clay	(Netherlands) Lubomira Bacheva	(Romania) Magda Mihalache (Slovakia) Zuzana Váleková	6–1, 7–5
Loss	7.	15 August 1999	Rebecq, Belgium	Clay	(Netherlands) Natalia Galouza	(China) Li Na (China) Li Ting	1–6, 4–6
Loss	8.	20 November 1999	Deauville, France	Clay (i)	(Czech Republic) Magdalena Zděnovcová	(France) Chloé Carlotti (France) Virginie Pichet	5–7, 4–6
Win	9.	27 February 2000	Buchen, Germany	Carpet (i)	(Hungary) Adrienn Hegedűs	(Germany) Magdalena Kučerová (Czech Republic) Ludmila Richterová	6–4, 6–2

== Junior Grand Slam finals ==
=== Doubles (0–1) ===
Result	Year	Championship	Surface	Partner	Opponents	Score
Loss	1993	French Open	Clay	(Netherlands) Lara Bitter	(Belgium) Laurence Courtois (Belgium) Nancy Feber	6–3, 1–6, 3–6
