= Linda Niemantsverdriet =

Dutch tennis player

- Country (sports): Netherlands
- Born: 10 December 1974 (age 50)
- Prize money: $35,951

Singles
- Career record: 67–39
- Career titles: 5 ITF
- Highest ranking: No. 166 (11 April 1994)

Grand Slam singles results
- French Open: Q1 (1994)
- Wimbledon: Q1 (1993)
- US Open: Q1 (1993)

Doubles
- Career record: 29–13
- Career titles: 5 ITF
- Highest ranking: No. 195 (19 December 1994)

Linda Niemantsverdriet (born 10 December 1974) is a Dutch former professional tennis player.

Niemantsverdriet, who at the age of 15 became the youngest Dutchwoman to win the senior national title, was a member of her country's World Youth Cup winning team in 1990. She turned professional in 1992 after graduating from high school.

On the WTA Tour, Niemantsverdriet performed best at the 1993 Indonesian Open, where she made it through to the quarterfinals. In 1994 she won a match in Tokyo against Yayuk Basuki, then the world's 35th ranked player.

== ITF finals ==
$25,000 tournaments
$10,000 tournaments

=== Singles: 6 (5–1) ===
Result	No.	Date	Tournament	Surface	Opponent	Score
Win	1.	31 August 1992	Burgas, Bulgaria	Clay	(Romania) Isabela Martin	5–7, 6–1, 6–4
Win	2.	7 September 1992	Varna, Bulgaria	Clay	(Russia) Elena Likhovtseva	6–2, 6–3
Win	3.	15 February 1993	Amadora, Portugal	Hard	(Germany) Svenja Truelsen	6–4, 6–3
Win	4.	22 February 1993	Oliveira de Azeméis, Portugal	Hard	(Netherlands) Lara Bitter	6–7^{(5)}, 6–3, 6–2
Win	5.	20 February 1994	Newcastle, England	Carpet (i)	(Austria) Marion Maruska	7–6, 6–4
Loss	1.	18 July 1994	Rheda-Wiedenbrück, Germany	Clay	(Russia) Tatiana Panova	0–6, 3–6

=== Doubles (5–1) ===
Result	No.	Date	Tournament	Surface	Partner	Opponents	Score
Win	1.	6 June 1992	Velp, Netherlands	Clay	(Netherlands) Nicolette Rooimans	(Czech Republic) Petra Raclavská (United States) Tara Collins	6–4, 6–1
Win	2.	8 February 1993	Faro, Portugal	Clay	(Croatia) Maja Murić	(Croatia) Darija Dešković (Czech Republic) Monika Kratochvílová	6–3, 6–3
Win	3.	22 February 1993	Lisbon, Portugal	Hard	(Netherlands) Maaike Koutstaal	(Netherlands) Lara Bitter (Netherlands) Kim de Weille	6–4, 6–3
Win	4.	28 March 1993	Brest, France	Hard	(Netherlands) Kristie Boogert	(Russia) Elena Likhovtseva (Russia) Elena Makarova	4–6, 7–5, 7–5
Loss	1.	12 July 1993	Vigo, Spain	Hard	(Netherlands) Petra Kamstra	(Argentina) María Fernanda Landa (Portugal) Sofia Prazeres	6–7, 6–3, 6–7
Win	5.	19 February 1994	Newcastle, England	Carpet (i)	(Netherlands) Maaike Koutstaal	(Republic of Ireland) Karen Nugent (United Kingdom) Joanne Ward	2–6, 7–5, 6–2
