= Amy deLone =

American tennis player

- Full name: Amy deLone
- Country (sports): United States
- Born: October 8, 1968 (age 56)
- Prize money: $25,853

Singles
- Highest ranking: No. 432 (January 31, 1994)

Doubles
- Highest ranking: No. 122 (October 4, 1993)

Grand Slam doubles results
- Australian Open: 1R (1994)
- US Open: 2R (1993)

Amy deLone (born October 8, 1968) is a former professional tennis player from the United States.

== Biography ==
Growing up in Lincoln, Massachusetts, deLone attended the nearby Concord Academy. She played collegiate tennis for Harvard University, then after graduating in 1991 turned professional.

In 1993 and 1994 she featured on the WTA Tour, as a doubles specialist. Her doubles partner was younger sister Erika deLone. The pair were runners-up at the Indonesian Women's Open in 1993, competing as qualifiers.

At the 1993 US Open, the deLone sisters made it past their first round match against the 12th seeded Maleeva sisters, Magdalena and Manuela, who had to retire hurt in the first set.

== WTA Tour finals ==
=== Doubles (0-1) ===
| Result | Date | Tournament | Tier | Surface | Partner | Opponents | Score |
|---|---|---|---|---|---|---|---|
| Loss | April 1993 | Jakarta, Indonesia | Tier IV | Hard | (United States) Erika deLone | (United States) Nicole Arendt (Australia) Kristine Kunce | 3–6, 4–6 |
