= Angela Kerek =

German tennis player

- Country (sports): Germany
- Born: 25 January 1972 (age 54)
- Prize money: $84,658

Singles
- Career record: 106–105
- Career titles: 1 ITF
- Highest ranking: No. 149 (23 March 1992)

Doubles
- Career record: 33–44
- Career titles: 1 ITF
- Highest ranking: No. 147 (29 April 1996)

Angela Kerek (born 25 January 1972) is a former professional tennis player from Germany. A lawyer by profession, she is now a partner with Morrison & Foerster in Berlin.

Kerek, who emigrated to Germany from Romania, played professional tennis with the Women's Tennis Association (WTA) for 8 years and German Bundesliga for 11 years. She achieved a career high singles ranking of 149 in the world and was featured in the qualifying draws of all four grand slam tournaments. Her best performance on the WTA Tour was a quarter-final appearance at Auckland in 1993.

== ITF finals ==
$50,000 tournaments
$25,000 tournaments
$10,000 tournaments

=== Singles (1–2) ===
Result	No.	Date	Location	Surface	Opponent	Score
Loss	1.	27 February 1989	Jaffa, Israel	Hard	(Israel) Yael Segal	2–6, 1–6
Win	1.	1 August 1994	Munich, Germany	Clay	(South Africa) Nannie de Villiers	7–6^{(7–5)}, 6–3
Loss	2.	27 February 1995	Southampton, Great Britain	Carpet (i)	(Belgium) Dominique Monami	6–0, 4–6, 3–6

=== Doubles (1–4) ===
Result	No.	Date	Location	Surface	Partner	Opponents	Score
Loss	1.	30 November 1992	Le Havre, France	Clay (i)	(Germany) Sabine Lohmann	(Romania) Irina Spîrlea (Romania) Ruxandra Dragomir	3–6, 6–7
Loss	2.	14 June 1993	Brindisi, Italy	Clay	(Romania) Irina Spîrlea	(Netherlands) Lara Bitter (Netherlands) Petra Kamstra	5–7, 6–4, 2–6
Loss	3.	29 November 1993	Ramat HaSharon, Israel	Hard	(Ukraine) Olga Lugina	(Russia) Natalia Egorova (Russia) Svetlana Parkhomenko	2–6, 3–6
Loss	4.	24 July 1994	Rheda-Wiedenbrück, Germany	Clay	(Germany) Kirstin Freye	(Netherlands) Seda Noorlander (Netherlands) Annemarie Mikkers	3–6, 2–6
Win	1.	1 October 1995	Bucharest, Romania	Clay	(Germany) Maja Živec-Škulj	(Bulgaria) Dora Djilianova (Bulgaria) Pavlina Nola	6–2, 6–7^{(5–7)}, 6–3
