= Laurence Courtois =

Belgian tennis player

- Country (sports): Belgium
- Born: 18 January 1976 (age 50) Kortrijk, Belgium
- Height: 1.72 m (5 ft 8 in)
- Turned pro: 1993
- Retired: 2002
- Plays: Right-handed
- Prize money: US$ 739,366

Singles
- Career record: 220–177
- Career titles: 3 ITF
- Highest ranking: No. 37 (18 November 1996)

Grand Slam singles results
- Australian Open: 3R (1996)
- French Open: 2R (1995, 1996)
- Wimbledon: 2R (1995, 1996)
- US Open: 2R (1996)

Other tournaments
- Olympic Games: 2R (1996)

Doubles
- Career record: 183–131
- Career titles: 4 WTA, 13 ITF
- Highest ranking: No. 32 (10 April 2000)

Grand Slam doubles results
- Australian Open: 3R (2001)
- French Open: 3R (1999, 2001)
- Wimbledon: 3R (1999)
- US Open: 3R (1995, 1998, 2000, 2001)

Other doubles tournaments
- Olympic Games: 2R (1996)

Team competitions
- Fed Cup: W (2001)

Laurence Courtois (French pronunciation: [lɔʁɑ̃s kuʁtwa]; born 18 January 1976) is a former professional female tennis player from Belgium.

Courtois, who was born in Kortrijk, won four doubles titles on the WTA Tour during her career.

== WTA Tour finals ==
=== Singles 2 ===
Legend
Grand Slam	0
WTA Championships	0
Tier I	0
Tier II	0
Tier III	0
Tier IV & V	0

Result	W/L	Date	Tournament	Surface	Opponent	Score
Loss	0–1	May 1996	Cardiff, Wales	Clay	(Belgium) Dominique Van Roost	4–6, 2–6
Loss	0–2	Jun 1999	Tashkent, Uzbekistan	Hard	(Israel) Anna Smashnova	3–6, 3–6

=== Doubles 9 (4–5) ===
Legend
Grand Slam	0
WTA Championships	0
Tier I	0
Tier II	1
Tier III	1
Tier IV & V	2

Titles by surface
Hard	3
Clay	1
Grass	0
Carpet	0

Result	W/L	Date	Tournament	Surface	Partner	Opponents	Score
Win	1–0	Feb 1994	Paris, France	Carpet (i)	(Belgium) Sabine Appelmans	(France) Mary Pierce (Hungary) Andrea Temesvári	6–4, 6–4
Loss	1–1	Jan 1995	Jakarta, Indonesia	Hard	(Belgium) Nancy Feber	(Germany) Claudia Porwik (Romania) Irina Spîrlea	2–6, 3–6
Loss	1–2	Apr 1996	Jakarta, Indonesia	Hard	(Belgium) Nancy Feber	(Japan) Rika Hiraki (Japan) Naoko Kijimuta	6–7, 5–7
Loss	1–3	May 1996	Cardiff, Wales	Clay	(Belgium) Els Callens	(United States) Katrina Adams (South Africa) Mariaan de Swardt	0–6, 4–6
Loss	1–4	Oct 1997	Luxembourg	Carpet (i)	(Germany) Meike Babel	(Latvia) Larisa Neiland (Czech Republic) Helena Suková	2–6, 4–6
Win	2–4	Aug 1998	Istanbul, Turkey	Hard	(Germany) Meike Babel	(Sweden) Åsa Carlsson (Argentina) Florencia Labat	6–0, 6–2
Win	3–4	Apr 1999	Cairo, Egypt	Clay	(Spain) Arantxa Sánchez Vicario	(Romania) Irina Spîrlea (Netherlands) Caroline Vis	5–7, 6–1, 7–6
Win	4–4	Oct 1999	Bratislava, Slovakia	Hard (i)	(Belgium) Kim Clijsters	(Belarus) Olga Barabanschikova (United States) Lilia Osterloh	6–2, 3–6, 7–5
Loss	4–5	Nov 2000	Leipzig, Germany	Carpet (i)	(Belgium) Kim Clijsters	(Spain) Arantxa Sánchez Vicario (France) Anne-Gaëlle Sidot	7–6^{(8–6)}, 5–7, 3–6

== ITF finals ==
=== Singles: 5 (3–2) ===
$100,000 tournaments
$75,000 tournaments
$50,000 tournaments
$25,000 tournaments
$10,000 tournaments

Result	No.	Date	Tournament	Surface	Opponent	Score
Win	1.	17 August 1992	Koksijde, Belgium	Clay	(Ukraine) Olga Lugina	6–3, 3–6, 6–3
Loss	2.	5 April 1993	Limoges, France	Carpet	(Italy) Silvia Farina Elia	3–6, 3–6
Win	3.	13 September 1993	Sofia, Bulgaria	Clay	(Bulgaria) Svetlana Krivencheva	6–1, 6–1
Win	4.	27 September 1993	Kirchheim, Austria	Clay	(Austria) Barbara Paulus	6–1, 6–3
Loss	5.	22 October 2000	Cardiff, United Kingdom	Carpet (i)	(Serbia and Montenegro) Dragana Zarić	5–7, 7–5, 4–6

=== Doubles: 16 (13-3) ===
Result	No.	Date	Tournament	Surface	Partner	Opponents	Score
Win	1.	25 August 1991	Koksijde, Belgium	Clay	(Belgium) Nancy Feber	(Israel) Nelly Barkan (Ukraine) Olga Lugina	4–6, 6–0, 6–4
Win	2.	27 October 1991	Flensburg, Germany	Carpet (i)	(Belgium) Nancy Feber	(Czech Republic) Alena Havrlíková (Czech Republic) Ivana Havrlíková	6–2, 6–3
Win	3.	10 November 1991	Ljusdal, Sweden	Carpet (i)	(Belgium) Nancy Feber	(Germany) Cora Linneman (Sweden) Eva Lena Olsson	6–2, 7–6^{(7–3)}
Win	4.	1 February 1992	Danderyd, Sweden	Carpet (i)	(Belgium) Nancy Feber	(Belgium) Katrien de Craemer (Ukraine) Olga Lugina	7–6^{(7–0)}, 6–3
Win	5.	19 April 1993	Bari, Italy	Clay	(Czech Republic) Eva Martincová	(Israel) Yael Segal (Australia) Kirrily Sharpe	2–6, 6–4, 6–1
Win	6.	17 August 1997	Bratislava, Slovakia	Clay	(Slovakia) Henrieta Nagyová	(Bulgaria) Pavlina Nola (Bulgaria) Svetlana Krivencheva	6–1, 6–0
Win	7.	5 July 1998	Vaihingen, Germany	Clay	(Croatia) Maja Murić	(Germany) Julia Abe (Bulgaria) Lubomira Bacheva	6–1, 6–4
Win	8.	13 July 1998	Darmstadt, Germany	Clay	(France) Noëlle van Lottum	(Hungary) Virág Csurgó (Hungary) Nóra Köves	7–5, 6–2
Win	9.	18 October 1998	Southampton, United Kingdom	Carpet (i)	(Belgium) Els Callens	(France) Amélie Cocheteux (France) Émilie Loit	6–2, 6–2
Win	10.	25 October 1998	Welwyn, United Kingdom	Carpet (i)	(Slovenia) Tina Križan	(Australia) Louise Pleming (United Kingdom) Samantha Smith	7–6, 6–4
Win	11.	7 March 1999	Dubai, United Arab Emirates	Hard	(Sweden) Åsa Carlsson	(Italy) Laura Golarsa (Kazakhstan) Irina Selyutina	6–3, 5–7, 6–0
Loss	12.	22 October 2000	Cardiff, United Kingdom	Carpet (i)	(Italy) Giulia Casoni	(United Kingdom) Julie Pullin (United Kingdom) Lorna Woodroffe	6–0, 1–6, 3–6
Loss	13.	4 March 2001	Minneapolis, United States	Hard (i)	(Australia) Alicia Molik	(Netherlands) Yvette Basting (Ukraine) Elena Tatarkova	5–7, 6–7^{(0–7)}
Win	14.	2 April 2001	Dubai, United Arab Emirates	Hard	(Netherlands) Seda Noorlander	(France) Caroline Dhenin (Hungary) Katalin Marosi	6–3, 6–0
Loss	15.	8 July 2001	Orbetello, Italy	Clay	(Bulgaria) Lubomira Bacheva	(Argentina) María Emilia Salerni (Argentina) Patricia Tarabini	6–7^{(5–7)}, 6–3, 1–6
Win	16.	14 October 2001	Poitiers, France	Hard (i)	(Netherlands) Kristie Boogert	(Bulgaria) Lubomira Bacheva (Netherlands) Amanda Hopmans	6–1, 7–5
