= Andrea Strnadová =

Czech tennis player

- Country (sports): Czech Republic
- Born: 28 May 1972 (age 53) Prague, Czechoslovakia
- Height: 1.75 m (5 ft 9 in)
- Turned pro: 1988
- Retired: 1995
- Prize money: US$ 504,157

Singles
- Career record: 4 ITF
- Highest ranking: No. 33 (16 September 1991)

Grand Slam singles results
- Australian Open: 3R (1991)
- French Open: 3R (1992)
- Wimbledon: 3R (1991)
- US Open: 3R (1992)

Doubles
- Career record: 105–84
- Career titles: 3 WTA, 2 ITF
- Highest ranking: No. 14 (19 April 1993)

Andrea Strnadová (born on 28 May 1972) is a Czech retired tennis player. She is married to Australian former tennis player Jason Stoltenberg.

Strnadová was awarded the WTA Most Impressive Newcomer in 1991.

== WTA career finals ==
=== Singles: 5 (5 runner-ups) ===
Result	W/L	Date	Tournament	Surface	Opponent	Score
Loss	0–1	Feb 1991	Auckland Open, New Zealand	Hard	(Czechoslovakia) Eva Švíglerová	2–6, 6–0, 1–6
Loss	0–2	Feb 1991	Wellington Classic, New Zealand	Hard	(Soviet Union) Leila Meskhi	6–3, 6–7^{(3–7)}, 2–6
Loss	0–3	Feb 1992	Auckland Open, New Zealand	Hard	(United States) Robin White	6–2, 4–6, 3–6
Loss	0–4	Apr 1992	Pattaya Open, Thailand	Hard	(Belgium) Sabine Appelmans	5–7, 6–3, 5–7
Loss	0–5	Apr 1992	Malaysia Open	Hard	(Indonesia) Yayuk Basuki	3–6, 0–6

=== Doubles: 6 (3 titles, 3 runner-ups) ===
Result	W/L	Date	Tournament	Surface	Partner	Opponents	Score
Win	1–0	Oct 1991	Zurich Open, Switzerland	Carpet	(Czechoslovakia) Jana Novotná	(United States) Zina Garrison (United States) Lori McNeil	6–4, 6–3
Loss	1–1	Mar 1992	U.S. Hard Court Championships	Hard	(United States) Patty Fendick	(United States) Martina Navratilova (United States) Pam Shriver	6–3, 2–6, 6–7
Win	2–1	May 1992	Internationaux de Strasbourg, France	Clay	(United States) Patty Fendick	(United States) Lori McNeil (Argentina) Mercedes Paz	6–3, 6–4
Loss	2–2	Oct 1992	Leipzig Cup, Germany	Carpet (i)	(United States) Patty Fendick	(Latvia) Larisa Neiland (Czech Republic) Jana Novotná	5–7, 6–7^{(4–7)}
Win	3–2.	Feb 1993	Paris Indoor, France	Hard	(Czechoslovakia) Jana Novotná	(United Kingdom) Jo Durie (France) Catherine Suire	7–6, 6–2
Loss	3–3	May 1994	Indonesia Open	Hard	(Australia) Kerry-Anne Guse	(United States) Nicole Arendt (Australia) Kristine Kunce	2–6, 2–6

== ITF Circuit finals ==
$25,000 tournaments
$10,000 tournaments

=== Singles (4–0) ===
Result	No.	Date	Tournament	Surface	Opponent	Score
Win	1.	19 September 1988	ITF Bol, Yugoslavia	Clay	(Czechoslovakia) Jitka Dubcová	3–6, 6–3, 6–3
Win	2.	19 September 1988	ITF Makarska, Yugoslavia	Clay	(Netherlands) Judith Warringa	6–2, 1–0 ret.
Win	3.	17 July 1989	ITF Darmstadt, West Germany	Clay	(Switzerland) Emanuela Zardo	6–1, 6–1
Win	4.	13 August 1990	ITF Karlovy Vary, Czechoslovakia	Clay	(Czechoslovakia) Karina Habšudová	6–3, 6–4

=== Doubles (2–2) ===
Result	No.	Date	Tournament	Surface	Partner	Opponents	Score
Win	1.	26 September 1988	ITF Šibenik, Yugoslavia	Clay	(Czechoslovakia) Alice Noháčová	(Czechoslovakia) Denisa Claassen (Netherlands) Judith Warringa	7–6, 6–0
Loss	2.	10 October 1988	ITF Rabac, Yugoslavia	Clay	(Czechoslovakia) Alice Noháčová	(Australia) Kate McDonald (Australia) Rennae Stubbs	0–6, 4–6
Loss	3.	6 November 1988	ITF Lengnau, Switzerland	Carpet (i)	(Czechoslovakia) Karin Baleková	(Australia) Kate McDonald (Australia) Rennae Stubbs	4–6, 6–2, 0–6
Win	4.	25 March 1990	ITF Moulins, France	Carpet (i)	(Bulgaria) Magdalena Maleeva	(France) Valerie Ledroff (France) Pascale Paradis	3–6, 6–1, 6–1

Preceded by Jennifer Capriati	WTA Newcomer of the Year; 1991	Succeeded by Debbie Graham
