= Nancy Feber =

Belgian tennis player

- Country (sports): Belgium
- Born: 5 February 1976 (age 49); Antwerp, Belgium
- Height: 1.60 m (5 ft 3 in)
- Turned pro: 1991
- Retired: 1998
- Plays: Left-handed (two-handed backhand)
- Prize money: US$ 314,809

Singles
- Career record: 127–98
- Career titles: 3 ITF
- Highest ranking: No. 79 (5 February 1996)

Grand Slam singles results
- Australian Open: 2R (1996)
- French Open: 2R (1995, 1996)
- Wimbledon: 3R (1994, 1995, 1996)
- US Open: 1R (1994, 1995)

Doubles
- Career record: 106–72
- Career titles: 8 ITF
- Highest ranking: No. 46 (10 April 1995)

Grand Slam doubles results
- Australian Open: 2R (1995)
- French Open: 2R (1997)
- Wimbledon: 1R (1995, 1996, 1997)
- US Open: 3R (1995)

Nancy Feber (born 5 February 1976) is a retired Belgian tennis player. As a junior player, she won four Grand Slam titles – one in singles and three in doubles. Feber won French Open twice, in 1992 and 1993, both times in doubles with Laurence Courtois. At the 1993 Wimbledon Championships, she triumphed in both singles and doubles.

Feber competed as a professional tennis player from 1991 to 1998. Her best Grand Slam singles performance is the third round of the 1994 Wimbledon Championships, the result she achieved in 1995 and 1996. In doubles, Feber reached three WTA Tour finals, one with Alexandra Fusai and two with Laurence Courtois, but won none.

During her career, Feber defeated players such as Helena Suková, Irina Spîrlea, Jo Durie, Rita Grande and Meghann Shaughnessy. She enjoyed success on the ITF Women's Circuit, winning three singles and eight doubles titles. Her highest rankings were No. 79 in singles and No. 46 in doubles.

She also played for Belgium Fed Cup team, with the score of 2–2 in singles and 9–1 in doubles.

== WTA career finals ==
=== Doubles: 3 (3 runner-ups) ===
Grand Slam
Tier I
Tier II
Tier III
Tier IV

Result	W–L	Date	Tournament	Tier	Surface	Partner	Opponents	Score
Loss	0–1	Nov 1994	Taipei Open, Taiwan	Tier IV	Hard	(France) Alexandra Fusai	(Australia) Michelle Jaggard-Lai (Canada) Rene Simpson	6–0, 7–6^{(12–10)}
Loss	0–2	Jan 1995	Jakarta Open, Indonesia	Tier III	Hard	(Belgium) Laurence Courtois	(Germany) Claudia Porwik (Romania) Irina Spîrlea	6–2, 6–3
Loss	0–3	Apr 1996	Jakarta Open, Indonesia	Tier III	Hard	(Belgium) Laurence Courtois	(Japan) Rika Hiraki (Japan) Naoko Kijimuta	7–6^{(7–2)}, 7–5

== ITF finals ==
Legend
$100,000 tournaments
$75,000 tournaments
$50,000 tournaments
$25,000 tournaments
$10,000 tournaments

=== Singles: 7 (3–4) ===
Result	No.	Date	Tournament	Surface	Opponent	Score
Loss	1.	November 1991	ITF Flensburg, Germany	Carpet (i)	(Germany) Heike Thoms	6–7^{(3)}, 4–6
Win	1.	November 1992	ITF Manchester, England	Carpet (i)	(Russia) Elena Makarova	7–5, 4–6, 6–2
Loss	2.	March 1993	ITF Brest, France	Hard	(France) Sylvie Sabas	3–6, 4–6
Loss	3.	February 1994	ITF Coburg, Germany	Carpet (i)	(Czech Republic) Ludmila Richterová	6–7^{(5)}, 2–6
Win	2.	March 1998	ITF Biel, Switzerland	Hard (i)	(Czech Republic) Květa Peschke	6–7^{(6)}, 6–3, 6–4
Loss	4.	April 1998	ITF Calvi, France	Hard	(Germany) Gabriela Kučerová	5–7, 1–6
Win	3.	April 1998	Open de Cagnes-sur-Mer, France	Hard	(France) Carine Bornu	6–0, 6–1

=== Doubles: 13 (8–5) ===
Result	No.	Date	Tournament	Surface	Partner	Opponents	Score
Win	1.	25 August 1991	ITF Koksijde, Belgium	Clay	(Belgium) Laurence Courtois	(Israel) Nelly Barkan (Ukraine) Olga Lugina	4–6, 6–0, 6–4
Win	2.	27 October 1991	ITF Flensburg, Germany	Carpet (i)	(Belgium) Laurence Courtois	(Czech Republic) Alena Havrlíková (Czech Republic) Ivana Havrlíková	6–2, 6–3
Win	3.	10 November 1991	ITF Ljusdal, Sweden	Carpet (i)	(Belgium) Laurence Courtois	(Germany) Cora Linneman (Sweden) Eva Lena Olsson	6–2, 7–6^{(3)}
Win	4.	1 February 1992	ITF Danderyd, Sweden	Carpet (i)	(Belgium) Laurence Courtois	(Belgium) Katrien de Craemer (Ukraine) Olga Lugina	7–6^{(0)}, 6–3
Loss	1.	9 February 1992	ITF Horsholm, Denmark	Carpet (i)	(Belgium) Katrien de Craemer	(Denmark) Sofie Albinus (Denmark) Tine Scheuer-Larsen	3–6, 4–6
Loss	2.	31 October 1993	ITF Poitiers, France	Hard (i)	(Belgium) Els Callens	(Ukraine) Olga Lugina (Germany) Elena Wagner	4–6, 6–3, 3–6
Win	5.	23 March 1997	ITF Woodlands, United States	Hard	(South Africa) Liezel Horn	(Germany) Sabine Haas (Sweden) Kristina Triska	6–1, 6–2
Win	6.	1 November 1997	ITF Poitiers, France	Hard (i)	(Czech Republic) Petra Langrová	(France) Lea Ghirardi (Bulgaria) Svetlana Krivencheva	3–6, 6–3, 6–1
Loss	3.	15 March 1998	ITF Biel, Switzerland	Hard (i)	(Slovenia) Tina Križan	(Germany) Kirstin Freye (France) Noëlle van Lottum	3–6, 6–3, 6–7^{(4)}
Win	7.	12 April 1998	ITF Calvi, France	Hard	(Germany) Jasmin Wöhr	(France) Emmanuelle Curutchet (France) Sophie Georges	4–1 ret.
Loss	4.	10 May 1998	ITF Cardiff, United Kingdom	Clay	(Czech Republic) Petra Langrová	(South Africa) Liezel Horn (Slovenia) Katarina Srebotnik	4–6, 3–6
Win	8.	17 May 1998	ITF Porto, Portugal	Clay	(Slovenia) Katarina Srebotnik	(South Africa) Surina De Beer (United States) Rebecca Jensen	5–7, 6–1, 6–4
Loss	5.	4 July 2011	ITF Brussels, Belgium	Clay	(Belgium) Els Callens	(Netherlands) Marcella Koek (Netherlands) Eva Wacanno	5–7, 6–3, [5–10]

== Junior Grand Slam finals ==
=== Singles (1–0) ===
Outcome	Year	Tournament	Surface	Opponent	Result
Winner	1993	Wimbledon	Grass	(Italy) Rita Grande	7–6^{(5)}, 1–6, 6–2

=== Doubles (3–0) ===
Outcome	Year	Tournament	Surface	Partner	Opponents	Result
Winner	1992	French Open (1)	Clay	(Belgium) Laurence Courtois	(United States) Lindsay Davenport (United States) Chanda Rubin	6–1, 5–7, 6–4
Winner	1993	French Open (2)	Clay	(Belgium) Laurence Courtois	(Netherlands) Lara Bitter (Netherlands) Maaike Koutstaal	3–6, 6–1, 6–3
Winner	1993	Wimbledon	Grass	(Belgium) Laurence Courtois	(Japan) Hiroko Mochizuki (Japan) Yuka Yoshida	6–3, 6–4
