= Petra Kamstra =

Dutch tennis player

- Country (sports): Netherlands
- Residence: Rotterdam, Netherlands
- Born: 18 March 1974 (age 51); Rotterdam, Netherlands
- Turned pro: 1989
- Retired: 1998
- Prize money: $184,407

Singles
- Career record: 144–94
- Career titles: 2 ITF
- Highest ranking: No. 70 (2 October 1995)

Grand Slam singles results
- Australian Open: 3R (1991)
- French Open: 2R (1996)
- Wimbledon: 4R (1995)
- US Open: 1R (1993, 1995)

Doubles
- Career record: 29–27
- Career titles: 1 WTA, 2 ITF
- Highest ranking: No. 97 (6 November 1995)

Petra Kamstra (born 18 March 1974) is a former professional tennis player from the Netherlands who won one WTA Tour-title in doubles during her career. She reached her individual career-high singles ranking on 2 October 1995, when Kamstra became the No. 70 of the world. Twice she was named the Rotterdam Sportswoman of the Year (1990 and 1992).

== WTA Tour finals ==
=== Doubles: 1 (title) ===
Legend
Tier I
Tier II
Tier III
Tier IV & V

Outcome	Date	Tournament	Surface	Partner	Opponents	Score
Winner	8 October 1995	Surabaya, Indonesia	Hard	(Slovenia) Tina Križan	(Japan) Nana Miyagi (United States) Stephanie Reece	2–6, 6–4, 6–1

== ITF finals ==
$25,000 tournaments
$10,000 tournaments

=== Singles (2–4) ===
Result	No.	Date	Tournament	Surface	Opponent	Score
Win	1.	17 July 1989	Koksijde, Belgium	Clay	(Netherlands) Heleen van den Berg	7–5, 7–5
Loss	2.	15 October 1990	Madeira, Portugal	Hard	(Germany) Sabine Gerke	1–6, 1–6
Win	3.	22 October 1990	Benin City, Nigeria	Hard	(United Kingdom) Sarah Bentley	6–0, 7–5
Loss	4.	24 May 1993	Brindisi, Italy	Clay	(Romania) Irina Spîrlea	1–6, 7–5, 3–6
Loss	5.	7 June 1993	Le Havre, France	Clay	(Czech Republic) Ludmila Richterová	7–6, 3–6, 4–6
Loss	6.	14 August 1995	Carthage, Tunisia	Clay	(Argentina) María Fernanda Landa	2–3 ret.

=== Doubles (2–2) ===
Result	No.	Date	Tournament	Surface	Partner	Opponent	Score
Loss	1.	15 October 1990	Madeira, Portugal	Hard	(Canada) Monica Mraz	(Germany) Cora Linneman (Brazil) Stephanie Mayorkis	4–6, 5–7
Win	2.	25 May 1992	Ashkelon, Israel	Hard	(Israel) Ilana Berger	(South Africa) Michelle Anderson (Israel) Limor Zaltz	6–2, 2–6, 6–4
Win	3.	24 May 1993	Brindisi, Italy	Clay	(Netherlands) Lara Bitter	(Germany) Angela Kerek (Romania) Irina Spîrlea	7–5, 4–6, 6–2
Loss	4.	12 July 1993	Vigo, Spain	Hard	(Netherlands) Linda Niemantsverdriet	(Argentina) María Fernanda Landa (Portugal) Sofia Prazeres	6–7, 6–3, 6–7

Awards
Preceded by Elly van Hulst	Rotterdam Sportswoman of the Year; 1990	Succeeded by Letitia Vriesde
Preceded by Letitia Vriesde	Rotterdam Sportswoman of the Year; 1992	Succeeded by Jacqueline Goormachtigh
