= Claudia Porwik =

German tennis player

- Country (sports): West Germany; Germany
- Born: 14 November 1968 (age 56) Coburg, West Germany
- Retired: 1997
- Prize money: $702,409

Singles
- Career record: 195–191
- Career titles: 3 ITF
- Highest ranking: No. 29 (2 April 1990)

Grand Slam singles results
- Australian Open: SF (1990)
- French Open: 3R (1986)
- Wimbledon: 3R (1982)
- US Open: 3R (1982)

Doubles
- Career record: 157–151
- Career titles: 6 WTA, 1 ITF
- Highest ranking: No. 24 (25 April 1994)

Grand Slam doubles results
- Australian Open: QF (1989)
- French Open: 3R (1988, 1992, 1993)
- Wimbledon: QF (1988)
- US Open: QF (1992)

Team competitions
- Fed Cup: 3–2

Claudia Porwik, born on 14 November 1968, is a former professional tennis player.

She played on the WTA Tour from 1986 to 1996 and reached the quarterfinals of the Australian Open in 1988 and the semifinals in 1990. Porwik retired with a 195–191 career record, including wins over Gabriela Sabatini and Conchita Martínez.

== Career ==
She won the German National Indoor Championships two times in 1990 and 1992. Porwik first played for West Germany in the Federation Cup in 1986. She played two singles matches in the Federation Cup, both for Germany in 1990, and won them both. She played her last Fed Cup match in 1995.

== WTA career finals ==
=== Singles: 1 runner-up ===
Result	W/L	Date	Tournament	Surface	Opponent	Score
Loss	0–1	Apr 1987	Taipei Championships, Taiwan	Carpet (i)	(Australia) Anne Minter	4–6, 1–6

=== Doubles: 10 (6 titles, 4 runner-ups) ===
Legend
Grand Slam	0
Tier I	0
Tier II	1
Tier III	3
Tier IV & V	1

Titles by surface
Hard	4
Clay	2
Grass	0
Carpet	0

Result	W/L	Date	Tournament	Surface	Partner	Opponents	Score
Win	1–0	May 1988	Taranto Trophy, Italy	Clay	(West Germany) Andrea Betzner	(Italy) Laura Garrone (Canada) Helen Kelesi	6–1, 6–2
Loss	1–1	May 1988	Swiss Open	Clay	(Sweden) Maria Lindström	(Switzerland) Christiane Jolissaint (South Africa) Dinky Van Rensburg	1–6, 3–6
Loss	1–2	Nov 1989	Virginia Slims of Indianapolis, US	Hard	(Soviet Union) Larisa Savchenko	(United States) Katrina Adams (United States) Lori McNeil	4–6, 4–6
Win	2–2	Aug 1991	Schenectady Open, US	Hard	(Australia) Rachel McQuillan	(United States) Nicole Arendt (United States) Shannan McCarthy	6–2, 6–4
Loss	2–3	Feb 1992	Essen Grand Prix, Germany	Carpet	(Belgium) Sabine Appelmans	(Bulgaria) Katerina Maleeva (Germany) Barbara Rittner	5–7, 3–6
Loss	2–4	Feb 1992	Generali Ladies Linz, Austria	Hard (i)	(Italy) Raffaella Reggi-Concato	(Netherlands) Miriam Oremans (Netherlands) Monique Kiene	6–4, 6–2
Win	3–4	Aug 1993	Schenectady Open, US	Hard	(Australia) Rachel McQuillan	(Argentina) Florencia Labat (Germany) Barbara Rittner	4–6, 6–4, 6–2
Win	4–4	Oct 1993	Montpellier Open, France	Carpet	(United States) Meredith McGrath	(Slovakia) Janette Husárová (Belgium) Dominique Monami	3–6, 6–2, 7–6
Win	5–4	Jan 1995	Jakarta Open, Indonesia	Hard	(Romania) Irina Spîrlea	(Belgium) Laurence Courtois (Belgium) Nancy Feber	6–2, 6–3
Win	6–4	Sep 1995	China Open	Hard	(United States) Linda Wild	(Netherlands) Stephanie Rottier (Chinese Taipei) Wang Shi-ting	6–1, 6–0

== ITF finals ==
=== Singles (3–0) ===
Legend
$50,000 tournaments
$25,000 tournaments
$10,000 tournaments

Result	No.	Date	Tournament	Surface	Opponent	Score
Win	1.	25 November 1985	ITF Telford, United Kingdom	Hard	(Netherlands) Nicole Muns-Jagerman	6–3, 6–4
Win	2.	3 March 1986	ITF Stockholm, Sweden	Clay	(Czechoslovakia) Petra Tesarová	6–1, 6–0
Win	3.	24 July 1995	ITF Valladolid, Spain	Clay	(Spain) María Sánchez Lorenzo	6–4, 6–2

=== Doubles (1–3) ===
Result	No.	Date	Tournament	Surface	Partner	Opponents	Score
Win	1.	5 August 1985	ITF Rheda, West Germany	Clay	(West Germany) Silke Meier	(United Kingdom) Belinda Borneo (United Kingdom) Lorrayne Gracie	4–6, 7–6, 6–1
Loss	2.	28 October 1985	ITF Peterborough, United Kingdom	Hard	(West Germany) Wiltrud Probst	(Czechoslovakia) Regina Rajchrtová (Czechoslovakia) Jana Novotná	7–5, 3–6, 4–6
Loss	3.	11 November 1985	ITF Queens, United Kingdom	Hard	(West Germany) Wiltrud Probst	(West Germany) Christina Singer-Bath (Czechoslovakia) Petra Tesarová	7–5, 4–6, 3–6
Loss	4.	3 March 1986	ITF Stockholm, Sweden	Clay	(West Germany) Silke Meier	(Czechoslovakia) Hana Fukárková (Czechoslovakia) Jana Novotná	4–6, 6–4, 3–6
