= Nicole Arendt =

American tennis player

- Country (sports): United States
- Residence: Sydney, Australia
- Born: August 26, 1969 (age 56) Somerville, New Jersey, U.S.
- Height: 5 ft 9.5 in (1.77 m)
- Turned pro: 1991
- Retired: 2003
- Plays: Left-handed
- College: University of Florida
- Prize money: US$ 1,642,964

Singles
- Career record: 172–131
- Career titles: 0
- Highest ranking: No. 49 (June 16, 1997)

Grand Slam singles results
- Australian Open: 3R (1996)
- French Open: 4R (1997)
- Wimbledon: 3R (1996, 1997)
- US Open: 3R (1995)

Doubles
- Career record: 324–171
- Career titles: 16
- Highest ranking: No. 3 (August 25, 1997)

Grand Slam doubles results
- Australian Open: SF (1996, 2001)
- French Open: SF (1995, 2002)
- Wimbledon: F (1997)
- US Open: SF (1997)

Nicole J. Arendt (born August 26, 1969) is an American retired professional tennis player. Arendt won sixteen doubles titles in her career. The left-hander reached her highest singles ranking on the WTA Tour on June 16, 1997, when she was ranked 49th in the world. Arendt reached her career-high doubles ranking of No. 3 in the world on August 25, 1997.

Arendt was born in Somerville, New Jersey. She attended the Hun School of Princeton for her high school education.

Arendt received an athletic scholarship to attend the University of Florida in Gainesville, Florida, where she played for coach Andy Brandi's Florida Gators women's tennis team in National Collegiate Athletic Association (NCAA) competition from 1988 to 1991. She was a key member of the Gators' NCAA national championship runners-up teams in 1988 and 1990, and received eight All-American honors during her college career.

She turned professional in 1991. Arendt's best Grand Slam doubles result was reaching the finals of the 1997 Wimbledon Championships, partnering with Manon Bollegraf. She and her mixed doubles partner Luke Jensen were the runners-up in the 1996 Australian Open and 1996 French Open. Her highest world doubles ranking was No. 3 on August 25, 1997.

Arendt was inducted into the University of Florida Athletic Hall of Fame in 2001; she graduated from the university with a bachelor's degree in public relations in 2003.

== Grand Slam finals ==
=== Doubles: 1 runner-up ===
Result	Year	Championship	Surface	Partner	Opponents	Score
Loss	1997	Wimbledon	Gras	(Netherlands) Manon Bollegraf	(United States) Gigi Fernández (Belarus) Natasha Zvereva	6–7, 4–6

=== Mixed doubles: 2 runner-ups ===
Result	Year	Championship	Surface	Partner	Opponents	Score
Loss	1996	Australian Open	Hard	(United States) Luke Jensen	(Latvia) Larisa Savchenko Neiland (Australia) Mark Woodforde	6–4, 5–7, 0–6
Loss	1996	French Open	Clay	(United States) Luke Jensen	(Argentina) Patricia Tarabini (Argentina) Javier Frana	2–6, 2–6

== WTA career finals ==
=== Doubles titles: 16 ===
Legend
WTA Championships (2)
Tier I (4)
Tier II (4)
Tier III (3)
Tier IV & V (3)

No.	Date	Tournament	Surface	Partner	Opponents	"Score
1.	Apr 1993	Jakarta Open, Indonesia	Hard	(Australia) Kristine Radford	(United States) Amy deLone (United States) Erika deLone	6–3, 6–4
2.	Apr 1994	Jakarta Open, Indonesia	Hard	(Australia) Kristine Radford	(Australia) Kerry Anne Guse (Czech Republic) Andrea Strnadová	6–2, 6–2
3.	Feb 1995	U.S. National Indoors	Hard (i)	(Italy) Laura Golarsa	(United States) Katrina Adams (Netherlands) Brenda Schultz	6–4, 6–3
4.	Mar 1995	Family Circle Cup, U.S.	Clay	(Netherlands) Manon Bollegraf	(United States) Gigi Fernández (Belarus) Natasha Zvereva	0–6, 6–3, 6–4
5.	Apr 1995	Virginia Slims of Houston, U.S.	Clay	(Netherlands) Manon Bollegraf	(Germany) Wiltrud Probst (Canada) Rene Simpson	6–4, 6–2
6.	Oct 1995	Zurich Open, Switzerland	Carpet (i)	(Netherlands) Manon Bollegraf	(United States) Chanda Rubin (Netherlands) Caroline Vis	6–4, 6–7^{(4–7)}, 6–4
7.	Oct 1995	Tournoi de Québec, Canada	Hard (i)	(Netherlands) Manon Bollegraf	(United States) Lisa Raymond (Australia) Rennae Stubbs	7–6^{(8–6)}, 4–6, 6–2
8.	May 1996	World Doubles Cup, Edinburgh	Clay	(Netherlands) Manon Bollegraf	(United States) Gigi Fernández (Belarus) Natasha Zvereva	6–3, 2–6, 7–6^{(8–6)}
9.	Oct 1996	Porsche Tennis Grand Prix, Germany	Hard (i)	(Czech Republic) Jana Novotná	(Switzerland) Martina Hingis (Czech Republic) Helena Suková	6–2, 6–3
10.	Feb 1997	Hanover Grand Prix, Germany	Carpet (i)	(Netherlands) Manon Bollegraf	(Latvia) Larisa Neiland (Netherlands) Brenda Schultz	4–6, 6–3, 7–6^{(7–4)}
11.	May 1997	Rome Masters, Italy	Clay	(Netherlands) Manon Bollegraf	(Spain) Conchita Martínez (Argentina) Patricia Tarabini	6–2, 6–4
12.	May 1997	World Doubles Cup, Edinburgh	Clay	(Netherlands) Manon Bollegraf	(Australia) Rachel McQuillan (Japan) Nana Miyagi	6–1, 3–6, 7–5
13.	Aug 1997	Connecticut Open, U.S.	Hard	(Netherlands) Manon Bollegraf	(France) Alexandra Fusai (France) Nathalie Tauziat	6–7^{(5–7)}, 6–3, 6–2
14.	Jan 2001	Canberra International, Australia	Hard	(Japan) Ai Sugiyama	(South Africa) Nannie De Villiers (Australia) Annabel Ellwood	6–4, 7–6^{(7–2)}
15.	Mar 2001	Indian Wells Masters, U.S.	Hard	(Japan) Ai Sugiyama	(Spain) Virginia Ruano Pascual (Argentina) Paola Suárez	6–4, 6–4
16.	Dec 2001	Auckland Open, New Zealand	Hard	(South Africa) Liezel Huber	(Czech Republic) Květa Hrdličková (Slovakia) Henrieta Nagyová	7–5, 6–4

=== Doubles runner-ups: 16 ===
No.	Date	Tournament	Surface	Partner	Opponents	"Score
1.	Aug 1991	Schenectady, U.S.	Hard	(United States) Shannan McCarthy	(Australia) Rachel McQuillan (Germany) Claudia Porwik	2–6, 4–6
2.	Apr 1993	Malaysian Open	Hard (i)	(Australia) Kristine Radford	(United States) Patty Fendick (United States) Meredith McGrath	4–6, 6–7^{(2–7)}
3.	Apr 1994	Kallang, Singapore	Hard	(Australia) Kristine Radford	(United States) Patty Fendick (United States) Meredith McGrath	4–6, 1–6
4.	Apr 1995	Amelia Island Championships, U.S.	Clay	(Netherlands) Manon Bollegraf	(South Africa) Amanda Coetzer (Argentina) Inés Gorrochategui	2–6, 6–3, 2–6
5.	Oct 1996	Zurich Open, Switzerland	Carpet (i)	(Belarus) Natasha Zvereva	(Switzerland) Martina Hingis (Czech Republic) Helena Suková	5–7, 4–6
6.	Nov 1996	Philadelphia Championships, U.S.	Carpet (i)	(United States) Lori McNeil	(United States) Lisa Raymond (Australia) Rennae Stubbs	4–6, 6–3, 3–6
7.	Apr 1997	Amelia Island Championships, U.S.	Clay	(Netherlands) Manon Bollegraf	(United States) Lindsay Davenport (Czech Republic) Jana Novotná	3–6, 0–6
8.	Jun 1997	Eastbourne International, UK	Grass	(Netherlands) Manon Bollegraf	(United States) Lori McNeil (Czech Republic) Helena Suková	Not played
9.	Jun 1997	Wimbledon, UK	Grass	(Netherlands) Manon Bollegraf	(United States) Gigi Fernández (Belarus) Natasha Zvereva	6–7, 4–6
10.	Aug 1997	Canadian Open,	Hard	(Netherlands) Manon Bollegraf	(Indonesia) Yayuk Basuki (Netherlands) Caroline Vis	6–3, 5–7, 4–6
11.	Mar 2000	Miami Masters, U.S.	Hard	(Netherlands) Manon Bollegraf	(France) Julie Halard (Japan) Ai Sugiyama	6–4, 5–7, 4–6
12.	May 2000	Hamburg Cup, Germany	Clay	(Netherlands) Manon Bollegraf	(Russia) Anna Kournikova (Belarus) Natasha Zvereva	7–6^{(7–5)}, 2–6, 4–6
13.	Nov 2000	WTA Championships, New York	Carpet (i)	(Netherlands) Manon Bollegraf	(Switzerland) Martina Hingis (Russia) Anna Kournikova	2–6, 3–6
14.	Jul 2001	Stanford Classic, U.S.	Hard	(Netherlands) Caroline Vis	(Chinese Taipei) Janet Lee (Indonesia) Wynne Prakusya	6–3, 3–6, 3–6
15.	Aug 2001	Manhattan Beach Classic, U.S.	Hard	(Netherlands) Caroline Vis	(United States) Kimberly Po-Messerli (France) Nathalie Tauziat	3–6, 5–7
16.	Sep 2001	Bahia, Brazil	Hard	(Argentina) Patricia Tarabini	(South Africa) Amanda Coetzer (United States) Lori McNeil	7–6^{(10–8)}, 2–6, 4–6

== Performance timeline ==
Key
W	F	SF	QF	#R	RR	Q#	DNQ	A	NH

(W) winner; (F) finalist; (SF) semifinalist; (QF) quarterfinalist; (#R) rounds 4, 3, 2, 1; (RR) round-robin stage; (Q#) qualification round; (DNQ) did not qualify; (A) absent; (NH) not held; (SR) strike rate (events won / competed); (W–L) win–loss record.

=== Doubles ===
Tournament	1987	1988	1989	1990	1991	1992	1993	1994	1995	1996	1997	1998	1999	2000	2001	2002	2003	SR	W–L
Australian Open	A	A	A	A	A	2R	1R	3R	2R	SF	QF	A	QF	1R	SF	3R	A	0 / 10	19–10
French Open	A	A	A	A	A	A	A	A	SF	QF	QF	A	2R	3R	QF	SF	2R	0 / 8	20–8
Wimbledon	A	A	A	A	A	1R	1R	SF	QF	3R	F	A	QF	2R	2R	2R	1R	0 / 11	20–11
US Open	A	A	A	A	1R	A	1R	3R	2R	QF	SF	A	QF	1R	1R	2R	A	0 / 10	14–10
Win–loss	0–0	0–0	0–0	0–0	0–1	1–2	0–3	8–3	9–4	11–4	15–4	0–0	10–4	3–4	7–4	8–4	1–2	0 / 39	73–39
Year-end championships
Tour Championships	A	A	A	A	A	A	A	A	SF	A	SF	A	A	F	A	QF	A	0 / 4	4–4
Tier I tournaments
Tokyo	Not Tier I						A	A	A	SF	A	A	A	QF	SF	1R	A	0 / 4	5–3
Indian Wells	Not Held		Not Tier I							A	A	A	A	QF	W	QF	A	1 / 3	9–2
Miami	Not Tier I			A	A	1R	1R	2R	2R	QF	QF	A	2R	F	1R	SF	A	0 / 10	14–10
Charleston	Not Tier I			A	A	A	A	A	W	SF	SF	A	2R	2R	SF	1R	A	1 / 7	12–6
Rome	Not Tier I			A	A	A	A	A	A	A	W	A	1R	1R	2R	1R	A	1 / 5	4–4
Berlin	Not Tier I			A	A	A	A	A	A	2R	A	A	QF	SF	2R	A	A	0 / 4	6–4
Montreal / Toronto	Not Tier I			A	A	A	1R	SF	A	2R	F	A	1R	1R	2R	SF	A	0 / 8	9–7
Zürich	Not Tier I						A	1R	W	F	A	A	A	1R	A	1R	A	1 / 5	7–4
Moscow	Not Held									NTI	A	A	A	1R	A	1R	A	0 / 2	0–2
Boca Raton	Not Tier I				A	2R	Not Tier I			Not Held								0 / 1	1–1
Philadelphia	Not Held				Not Tier I		A	A	QF	Not Tier I					Not Held			0 / 1	1–1
Career statistics
Year-end ranking	—	426	—	—	127	146	85	24	11	11	8	—	32	11	10	19	313		

== See also ==
- Florida Gators
- List of Florida Gators tennis players
- List of University of Florida alumni
- List of University of Florida Athletic Hall of Fame members

Awards
Preceded by (Canada) Jill Hetherington	Karen Krantzcke Sportsmanship Award; 1993	Succeeded by (United States) Kimberly Po
