= Erika deLone =

American tennis player

- Country (sports): United States
- Residence: Lincoln, Massachusetts
- Born: October 14, 1972 (age 52); Boston, Massachusetts
- Height: 1.70 m (5 ft 7 in)
- Turned pro: June 9, 1992
- Plays: Right-handed (two-handed backhand)
- Prize money: US$ 766,020

Singles
- Career record: 345–296
- Career titles: 9 ITF
- Highest ranking: 65 (April 10, 2000)

Grand Slam singles results
- Australian Open: 2R (1990, 2000)
- French Open: 2R (2000)
- Wimbledon: 1R (1991, 1999, 2000)
- US Open: 2R (1991, 1995)

Doubles
- Career record: 170–190
- Career titles: 1 WTA, 9 ITF
- Highest ranking: 45 (December 4, 2000)

Erika deLone (born October 14, 1972) is an American retired tennis player who turned professional in 1992. She reached one WTA Tour singles final in her career, finishing runner-up to Åsa Svensson at the Wismilak International in 1999. In April 2000, she reached her career-high singles ranking of world No. 65.

DeLone won one WTA Tour doubles title in her career, winning the 2000 Rosmalen Grass Court Championships in 's-Hertogenbosch, partnering Australian Nicole Pratt. She reached her career-high doubles ranking of world No. 45 in December 2000. In 2003, she retired from professional tennis. Her sister Amy was a professional tennis player as well.

== WTA career finals ==
Legend
Tier I (0–0)
Tier II (0–0)
Tier III (1–)
Tier IV (0–1)

=== Singles: 1 (1 runner-up) ===
Result	Date	Tournament	Surface	Opponent	Score
Loss	Nov 1999	Kuala Lumpur Classic, Malaysia	Hard	(Sweden) Åsa Carlsson	2–6, 4–6

=== Doubles: 2 (1 title, 1 runner-up) ===
Result	Date	Tournament	Surface	Partner	Opponents	Score
Loss	Apr 1993	Jakarta Open, Indonesia	Hard	(United States) Amy deLone	(United States) Nicole Arendt (Australia) Kristine Kunce	3–6, 4–6
Win	Jun 2000	Rosmalen Open, Netherlands	Grass	(Australia) Nicole Pratt	(Australia) Catherine Barclay-Reitz (Slovakia) Karina Habšudová	7–6^{(7–4)}, 4–3 ret.

== ITF Circuit finals ==
$100,000 tournaments
$75,000 tournaments
$50,000 tournaments
$25,000 tournaments
$10,000 tournaments

=== Singles: 12 (9–3) ===
Result	No.	Date	Tournament	Surface	Opponent	Score
Win	1.	14 December 1992	ITF Kooyong, Australia	Grass	(Australia) Elizabeth Smylie	7–5, 7–5
Loss	2.	21 May 1995	ITF Bordeaux, France	Clay	(Slovakia) Henrieta Nagyová	1–6, 3–6
Win	3.	17 July 1995	ITF Wilmington, U.S.	Hard	(United States) Christine Neumann	3–6, 6–1, 6–3
Loss	4.	11 August 1997	ITF Bronx, U.S.	Hard	(Australia) Rachel McQuillan	1–6, 4–6
Win	5.	12 April 1999	ITF Las Vegas, U.S.	Hard	(Israel) Hila Rosen	6–3, 6–2
Win	6.	3 May 1999	ITF Sarasota, U.S.	Clay	(Australia) Nicole Pratt	7–6^{(8–6)}, 6–7^{(7–9)}, 7–5
Win	7.	10 May 1999	ITF Midlothian, U.S.	Clay	(Australia) Annabel Ellwood	6–3, 6–4
Win	8.	12 July 1999	ITF Morristown, U.S.	Hard	(Australia) Nicole Pratt	7–5, 7–6^{(7–1)}
Loss	9.	19 July 1999	ITF Peachtree City, U.S.	Hard	(Russia) Alina Jidkova	7–6^{(7–1)}, 6–7^{(0–7)}, 4–6
Win	10.	22 August 1999	ITF Bronx, U.S.	Hard	(Belgium) Els Callens	6–1, ret.
Win	11.	29 January 2002	ITF Rockford, U.S.	Hard (i)	(United States) Brie Rippner	2–6, 6–4, 7–6^{(7–1)}
Win	12.	19 May 2002	ITF Charlottesville, U.S.	Hard	(Federal Republic of Yugoslavia) Jelena Janković	6–2, 6–4

=== Doubles: 17 (9–8) ===
Result	No.	Date	Tournament	Surface	Partner	Opponents	Score
Loss	1.	24 October 1988	ITF Montevideo, Uruguay	Clay	(United States) Alix Creek	(Netherlands) Marielle Rooimans (Netherlands) Nicolette Rooimans	2–6, 2–6
Win	2.	19 June 1989	ITF Brindisi, Italy	Clay	(Argentina) Florencia Labat	(Finland) Nanne Dahlman (Australia) Rennae Stubbs	6–3, 7–6
Loss	3.	21 May 1995	ITF Bordeaux, France	Clay	(Australia) Nicole Pratt	(Netherlands) Seda Noorlander (Czech Republic) Helena Vildová	3–6, 1–6
Win	4.	15 July 1996	ITF Wilmington, U.S.	Hard	(Australia) Nicole Pratt	(Canada) Maureen Drake (United States) Meilen Tu	7–5, 7–6^{(7–2)}
Loss	5.	30 September 1996	ITF Newport Beach, U.S.	Hard	(Australia) Nicole Pratt	(Argentina) Mercedes Paz (Canada) Rene Simpson	3–6, 1–6
Win	6.	21 April 1997	ITF Monterrey, Mexico	Hard	(Australia) Louise Pleming	(United States) Stephanie Mabry (United States) Brie Rippner	7–6^{(7–3)}, 3–6, 7–6^{(7–3)}
Win	7.	2 June 1997	ITF Tashkent, Uzbekistan	Hard	(Australia) Nicole Pratt	(Spain) Alicia Ortuño (Israel) Hila Rosen	6–3, 6–1
Loss	8.	15 February 1998	ITF Midland, U.S.	Hard (i)	(Belarus) Olga Barabanschikova	(Australia) Catherine Barclay (Australia) Kerry-Anne Guse	2–6, 4–6
Win	9.	20 April 1998	ITF Indian Hill, U.S.	Hard	(United States) Katie Schlukebir	(South Africa) Kim Grant (United States) Jolene Watanabe	6–4, 4–6, 6–3
Loss	10.	5 October 1998	ITF Albuquerque, U.S.	Hard	(Australia) Nicole Pratt	(Australia) Rachel McQuillan (Japan) Nana Miyagi	6–7^{(5–7)}, 2–6
Loss	11.	12 October 1998	ITF Indian Wells, U.S.	Hard	(United States) Katie Schlukebir	(United States) Lindsay Lee-Waters (New Zealand) Pavlina Nola	0–6, 7–6^{(7–4)}, 1–6
Win	12.	5 April 1999	ITF Fresno, U.S.	Hard	(Australia) Annabel Ellwood	(South Africa) Kim Grant (Sweden) Kristina Triska	7–5, 7–5
Win	13.	18 April 1999	ITF Las Vegas, U.S.	Hard	(Australia) Annabel Ellwood	(Japan) Rika Hiraki (Australia) Lisa McShea	7–6^{(7–4)}, 6–2
Loss	14.	16 May 1999	ITF Midlothian, U.S.	Clay	(Australia) Annabel Ellwood	(South Africa) Nannie de Villiers (South Africa) Jessica Steck	4–6, 0–6
Loss	15.	3 April 2000	ITF West Palm Beach, U.S.	Clay	(Australia) Nicole Pratt	(Japan) Rika Hiraki (Japan) Yuka Yoshida	6–1, 0–6, 6–7^{(5–7)}
Win	16.	30 July 2001	ITF Vancouver, Canada	Hard	(Canada) Renata Kolbovic	(Slovenia) Petra Rampre (Canada) Vanessa Webb	2–6, 6–4, 6–4
Winner	17.	19 May 2002	ITF Charlottesville, U.S.	Clay	(South Africa) Jessica Steck	(United States) Teryn Ashley (United States) Kristen Schlukebir	6–2, 2–6, 7–5

== Unplayed final ==
Outcome	No.	Date	Tournament	Surface	Partner	Opponents	Score
NP	—	21 October 2001	ITF Largo, U.S.	Hard	(Switzerland) Emmanuelle Gagliardi	(New Zealand) Leanne Baker (India) Manisha Malhotra	NP
