= Yayuk Basuki =

Indonesian tennis player

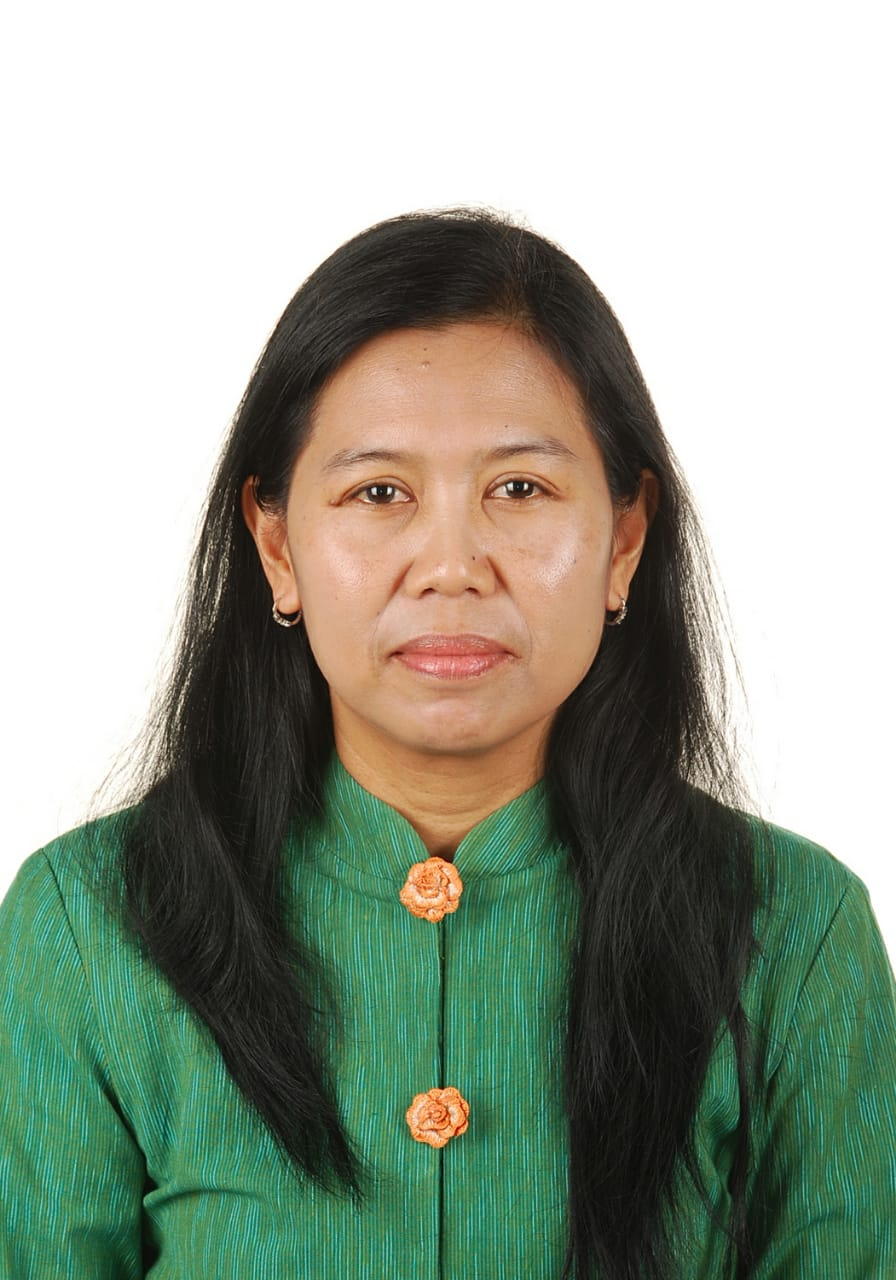
- Full name: Nany Rahayu Basuki
- Country (sports): Indonesia
- Born: 30 November 1970 (age 55) Yogyakarta, Indonesia
- Height: 1.64 m (5 ft 5 in)
- Turned pro: 1990
- Retired: 2013
- Plays: Right-handed (one-handed backhand)
- Prize money: $1,665,152

Singles
- Career record: 238–171
- Career titles: 6 WTA, 5 ITF
- Highest ranking: No. 19 (6 October 1997)

Grand Slam singles results
- Australian Open: 4R (1998)
- French Open: 3R (1996)
- Wimbledon: QF (1997)
- US Open: 2R (1991, 1997)

Doubles
- Career record: 378–206
- Career titles: 9 WTA, 25 ITF
- Highest ranking: No. 9 (6 July 1998)

Grand Slam doubles results
- Australian Open: QF (1996, 1999)
- French Open: QF (1997)
- Wimbledon: QF (1996)
- US Open: SF (1993)

Grand Slam mixed doubles results
- Australian Open: 2R (2000)
- French Open: QF (1995)
- Wimbledon: QF (1997)
- US Open: 2R (1997)

Team competitions
- Fed Cup: 62–28
- Political party: PAN
Medal record
Women's Tennis
Representing Indonesia
Asian Games
Gold medal – first place	1986 Seoul	Doubles
Gold medal – first place	1990 Beijing	Doubles
Gold medal – first place	1990 Beijing	Mixed doubles
Gold medal – first place	1998 Bangkok	Singles
Silver medal – second place	1990 Beijing	Team
Silver medal – second place	1994 Hiroshima	Team
Bronze medal – third place	1986 Seoul	Team
Bronze medal – third place	1994 Hiroshima	Singles
Bronze medal – third place	1998 Bangkok	Team
SEA Games
Gold medal – first place	1985 Bangkok	Team
Gold medal – first place	1987 Jakarta	Singles
Gold medal – first place	1987 Jakarta	Doubles
Gold medal – first place	1987 Jakarta	Team
Gold medal – first place	1989 Kuala Lumpur	Singles
Gold medal – first place	1989 Kuala Lumpur	Team
Gold medal – first place	1995 Chiang Mai	Doubles
Gold medal – first place	1995 Chiang Mai	Mixed doubles
Gold medal – first place	1995 Chiang Mai	Team
Gold medal – first place	2001 Kuala Lumpur	Doubles
Gold medal – first place	2001 Kuala Lumpur	Team
Silver medal – second place	1989 Kuala Lumpur	Doubles
Silver medal – second place	2001 Kuala Lumpur	Mixed doubles
Bronze medal – third place	1985 Bangkok	Singles

Yayuk Basuki (born 30 November 1970) is an Indonesian former professional tennis player who is now a politician. She was the highest-ever ranked tennis player from Indonesia, having reached No. 19 in singles in the WTA rankings in October 1997. She retired from playing singles in 2000, but remained an active doubles player on the circuit until 2013.

She sat in the Indonesian House of Representatives between 2014 and 2019. In January 2018, she was elected Chair of the Indonesian Olympian Association (IOA) for a four-year term. She unsuccessfully ran for re-election in 2019.

== Sporting career ==
She began playing tennis at the age of seven and turned professional in 1990. In 1991, she became the first Indonesian player to win a major professional tennis event when she captured the singles titles at Pattaya. She won six WTA Tour singles titles during her career (all of them in Asia). Her best singles performance at a Grand Slam event came at Wimbledon in 1997, where she reached the quarterfinals by defeating Ai Sugiyama, Inés Gorrochategui, Naoko Kijimuta and Patricia Hy-Boulais before losing to Jana Novotná.

During her career, she has recorded wins over Amélie Mauresmo, Mary Joe Fernández, Lindsay Davenport, Gabriela Sabatini, Magdalena Maleeva, Anke Huber, Iva Majoli, Anna Kournikova, Zina Garrison, and Mary Pierce. She also became only the second Indonesian woman to win the Asian Games singles gold medal, after Lita Liem Sugiarto in 1974, when she defeated Tamarine Tanasugarn in Bangkok at the 1998 games. She was the first player to be beaten by Lindsay Davenport in the main draw of a Grand Slam tournament, at the US Open in 1992.

She represented Indonesia at the Summer Olympic Games in 1988, 1992, 1996 and 2000. 1992 in Barcelona, she defeated Mercedes Paz and Mary Pierce to reach the third round of the singles competition, where she was beaten by Jennifer Capriati.

She is also a successful doubles player, often pairing with Nana Miyagi and later Caroline Vis, and reached the top 10 (No. 9 on 6 July 1998). She won nine tour doubles titles, the most significant of which was the Canadian Open in 1997 and qualified for the season-ending WTA Championships as one of the best eight teams of the year three times, 1996–98. Her best result in doubles competition at a Grand Slam event was in the 1993 US Open, where she and partner Nana Miyagi reached the semifinals.

In the mixed doubles, Basuki reached the quarterfinals at the French Open in 1995 with Kenny Thorne as her partner. In 1997, she reached the same stage at Wimbledon, this time paired with Tom Nijssen.

Her career-high world rankings were world No. 19 in singles and No. 9 in doubles.

Basuki is now a coach, tennis commentator for TV and print media and a consultant to the sports minister. She also was a WTA Tour mentor to rising Indonesian star Angelique Widjaja.

Basuki retired from the professional circuit in 2004, but in March 2008 she made a return to the ITF Circuit playing exclusively in doubles, and has since won six more ITF titles. She won the $10k event at Bangkok in June with Indonesian-born Australian Tiffany Welford. In August, she won the Hechingen, Germany with compatriot Romana Tedjakusuma and yet another $25k title, this time in Augusta, Georgia, in October, again with Tedjakusuma. In the first tournament she played in 2009, the $25k Balikpapan event in Indonesia, she and Tedjakusuma won the doubles competition. In May 2009, she won consecutive $25k events in Goyang and then Gimhae, both in the Korean Republic, and again, both with Tedjakusuma.

Basuki played in the doubles at the 2010 Australian Open, partnering Kimiko Date-Krumm, losing in the first round to Sania Mirza and Virginia Ruano Pascual.

In 2011, Basuki played in three WTA and five ITF tournaments. She successfully represented Indonesia in the Fed Cup, winning four matches with partner Jessy Rompies to see Indonesia back into the Asia/Oceania Group I. Her most recent appearance in a WTA Tour event was in September 2011 at the Guangzhou International Open, in which she and partner Lu Jingjing reached the quarterfinals.

As of December 2012, her most recent appearance in a professional tournament was in the $25k event in Phuket in March 2012. She and partner Kao Shao-yuan reached the quarterfinals of the doubles competition. In 2013, she retired from the tour to pursue a career as a politician.

== Political career ==
In the 2014 Indonesian parliamentary election, she stood for a seat in the DPR with the National Mandate Party (PAN) from Central Java I electoral district. She was elected and sat on Commission X focusing on education, sports, and history. In the 2019 election, Basuki again ran as a legislative candidate in the same electoral district. However, the party did not win enough votes and therefore she lost her seat in the parliament.

== Awards ==
- WTA Sportsmanship Award, 1996 and 1998
- Female Rookie of the Year 1991, TENNIS Magazine
- Indonesian Athlete of the Year 1991
- Nominated as Most Impressive Newcomer 1991, WTA Tour
- Special Award from President Soeharto of Indonesia for outstanding contribution to sports, 1991

== Personal life ==
She married her coach and mixed-doubles partner Hary Suharyadi, with whom she won gold at the 1990 Asian Games, on 31 January 1994. On 23 September 1999, she gave birth to her first child. She returned to playing on the tour the following year.

== WTA career finals ==
Legend
Grand Slam tournaments (0)
Tier I (3)
Tier II (4)
Tier III (5)
Tier IV & V (13)

=== Singles: 8 (6 titles, 2 runner-ups) ===
Result	W/L	Date	Tournament	Surface	Opponent	Score
Win	1–0	Apr 1991	Pattaya Open, Thailand	Hard	(Japan) Naoko Sawamatsu	6–2, 6–2
Win	2–0	Apr 1992	Malaysia Open	Hard	(Czech Republic) Andrea Strnadová	6–3, 6–0
Win	3–0	Apr 1993	Pattaya Open, Thailand	Hard	(United States) Marianne Werdel	6–3, 6–1
Win	4–0	May 1993	Indonesian Open	Hard	(United States) Ann Grossman	6–4, 6–4
Win	5–0	Feb 1994	China Open	Hard (i)	(Japan) Kyōko Nagatsuka	6–4, 6–2
Win	6–0	May 1994	Indonesian Open	Hard	(Argentina) Florencia Labat	6–4, 3–6, 7–6
Loss	6–1	Apr 1996	Indonesian Open	Hard	(United States) Linda Wild	w/o
Loss	6–2	Jun 1997	Birmingham Classic, UK	Grass	(France) Nathalie Tauziat	6–2, 2–6, 2–6

=== Doubles: 17 (9 titles, 8 runner-ups) ===
Result	W/L	Date	Tournament	Surface	Partner	Opponents	Score
Loss	0–1	Nov 1991	VS Brentwood, United States	Hard (i)	(Netherlands) Caroline Vis	(United States) Sandy Collins (South Africa) Elna Reinach	7–5, 4–6, 6–7
Loss	0–2	Sep 1992	Tokyo Championships, Japan	Hard	(Japan) Nana Miyagi	(United States) Mary Joe Fernández (United States) Robin White	4–6, 4–6
Win	1–2	Oct 1993	Sapporo Open, Japan	Carpet (i)	(Japan) Nana Miyagi	(Japan) Yone Kamio (Japan) Naoko Kijimuta	6–4, 6–2
Win	2–2	Oct 1993	Taiwan Open	Hard	(Japan) Nana Miyagi	(Australia) Jo-Anne Faull (Australia) Kristine Kunce	6–4, 6–2
Loss	2–3	Apr 1994	Japan Open	Hard	(Japan) Nana Miyagi	(Japan) Mami Donoshiro (Japan) Ai Sugiyama	4–6, 1–6
Loss	2–4	Apr 1994	Pattaya Open, Thailand	Hard	(Japan) Nana Miyagi	(United States) Patty Fendick (United States) Meredith McGrath	6–7, 6–3, 3–6
Win	3–4	Nov 1994	Surabaya Classic, Indonesia	Hard	(Indonesia) Romana Tedjakusuma	(Japan) Kyōko Nagatsuka (Japan) Ai Sugiyama	w/o
Win	4–4	Jan 1996	Hobart International, Australia	Hard	(Japan) Kyōko Nagatsuka	(Australia) Kerry-Anne Guse (South Korea) Park Sung-hee	7–6, 6–3
Win	5–4	May 1996	Internationaux de Strasbourg, France	Clay	(Australia) Nicole Bradtke	(United States) Marianne Werdel-Witmeyer (United States) Tami Whitlinger-Jones	5–7, 6–4, 6–4
Win	6–4	Aug 1997	LA Tennis Championships, United States	Hard	(Netherlands) Caroline Vis	(Latvia) Larisa Savchenko-Neiland (Czech Republic) Helena Suková	7–6, 6–3
Win	7–4	Aug 1997	Canadian Open	Hard	(Netherlands) Caroline Vis	(United States) Nicole Arendt (Netherlands) Manon Bollegraf	3–6, 7–5, 6–4
Loss	7–5	Sep 1997	Sparkassen Cup Leipzig, Germany	Carpet (i)	(Czech Republic) Helena Suková	(Switzerland) Martina Hingis (Czech Republic) Jana Novotná	2–6, 2–6
Loss	7–6	Nov 1997	Kremlin Cup, Russia	Carpet (i)	(Netherlands) Caroline Vis	(Spain) Arantxa Sánchez Vicario (Belarus) Natasha Zvereva	3–5 def.
Loss	7–7	May 1998	Internationaux de Strasbourg, France	Clay	(Netherlands) Caroline Vis	(France) Alexandra Fusai (France) Nathalie Tauziat	4–6, 3–6
Loss	7–8	Aug 1998	Canadian Open	Hard	(Netherlands) Caroline Vis	(Switzerland) Martina Hingis (Czech Republic) Jana Novotná	3–6, 4–6
Win	8–8	Nov 2000	Pattaya Open, Thailand	Hard	(Netherlands) Caroline Vis	(Slovenia) Tina Križan (Slovenia) Katarina Srebotnik	6–3, 6–3
Win	9–8	Feb 2001	Dubai Championships, U.A.E.	Hard	(Netherlands) Caroline Vis	(Sweden) Åsa Carlsson (Slovakia) Karina Habšudová	6–0, 4–6, 6–2

== ITF Circuit finals ==
Legend
$100,000 tournaments
$75,000 tournaments
$50,000 tournaments
$25,000 tournaments
$10,000 tournaments

=== Singles: 5 (5 titles) ===
Result	No.	Date	Tournament	Surface	Opponent	Score
Win	1.	6 August 1989	ITF Jakarta, Indonesia	Hard	(Indonesia) Suzanna Wibowo	7–6^{(5)}, 1–6, 6–4
Win	2.	24 September 1989	ITF Bangkok, Thailand	Hard	(China) Tang Min	6–3, 6–3
Win	3.	21 January 1990	ITF Jakarta, Indonesia	Hard	(Netherlands) Judith Warringa	6–2, 6–4
Win	4.	12 August 1990	ITF Jakarta, Indonesia	Hard	(Indonesia) Suzanna Wibowo	5–7, 6–4, 6–3
Win	5.	10 February 1991	ITF Jakarta, Indonesia	Hard	(Japan) Misumi Miyauchi	6–2, 6–2

=== Doubles: 36 (25 titles, 11 runner–ups) ===
Result	No.	Date	Tournament	Surface	Partner	Opponents	Score
Win	1.	6 July 1986	ITF Brindisi, Italy	Clay	(Indonesia) Suzanna Wibowo	(China) Li Xinyi (China) Zhong Ni	6–4, 4–6, 6–2
Win	2.	27 October 1986	ITF Saga, Japan	Grass	(Indonesia) Suzanna Wibowo	(Netherlands) Marianne van der Torre (Brazil) Themis Zambrzycki	6–2, 6–3
Win	3.	10 November 1986	ITF Matsuyama, Japan	Hard	(Indonesia) Suzanna Wibowo	(New Zealand) Belinda Cordwell (United States) Wendy Wood	0–6, 6–4, 6–2
Win	4.	24 November 1986	ITF Kyoto, Japan	Hard	(Indonesia) Suzanna Wibowo	(Japan) Kazuko Ito (Japan) Junko Kimura	6–3, 6–3
Win	5.	12 July 1987	ITF Paliano, Italy	Clay	(Indonesia) Suzanna Wibowo	(Italy) Laura Lapi (Italy) Barbara Romanò	6–4, 2–6, 6–0
Win	6.	19 July 1987	ITF Subiaco, Italy	Clay	(Indonesia) Suzanna Wibowo	(Netherlands) Ilonka Leyten (Netherlands) Brigette Pardoel	7–5, 7–5
Win	7.	25 October 1987	ITF Ibaraki, Japan	Hard	(Indonesia) Suzanna Wibowo	(Australia) Alison Scott (United States) Stephanie Savides	6–2, 4–6, 6–0
Win	8.	1 November 1987	ITF Matsuyama, Japan	Hard	(Indonesia) Suzanna Wibowo	(United States) Jennifer Fuchs (United States) Jill Smoller	6–4, 3–6, 6–1
Loss	1.	12 June 1988	ITF Modena, Italy	Clay	(Japan) Ei Iida	(Soviet Union) Eugenia Maniokova (Soviet Union) Viktoria Milvidskaia	3–6, 6–4, 0–6
Loss	2.	19 June 1988	ITF Salerno, Italy	Clay	(Finland) Anne Aallonen	(Soviet Union) Eugenia Maniokova (Soviet Union) Viktoria Milvidskaia	6–1, 5–7, 4–6
Loss	3.	26 June 1988	ITF Arezzo, Italy	Clay	(Netherlands) Titia Wilmink	(Soviet Union) Eugenia Maniokova (Soviet Union) Viktoria Milvidskaia	6–0, 5–7, 1–6
Loss	4.	3 July 1988	ITF Brindisi, Italy	Clay	(Japan) Ei Iida	(France) Frédérique Martin (France) Virginie Paquet	7–5, 2–6, 2–6
Win	9.	16 October 1988	ITF Chiba, Japan	Hard	(Japan) Ei Iida	(Japan) Naoko Sato (Japan) Maya Kidowaki	6–2, 7–6
Win	10.	11 June 1989	ITF Milan, Italy	Clay	(Indonesia) Suzanna Wibowo	(New Zealand) Claudine Toleafoa (New Zealand) Ruth Seeman	5–7, 6–4, 6–2
Win	11.	6 August 1989	ITF Jakarta, Indonesia	Hard	(Indonesia) Suzanna Wibowo	(Indonesia) Patricia Budiono (Indonesia) Lukky Tedjamukti	4–6, 6–0, 6–3
Win	12.	12 November 1989	ITF Nuriootpa, Australia	Hard	(Indonesia) Suzanna Wibowo	(Australia) Justine Hodder (Australia) Kelli-Ann Johnston	6–3, 6–4
Win	13.	21 January 1990	ITF Jakarta, Indonesia	Hard	(Indonesia) Suzanna Wibowo	(United Kingdom) Alexandra Niepel (United Kingdom) Caroline Billingham	w/o
Loss	5.	15 April 1990	ITF Bari, Italy	Clay	(Indonesia) Suzanna Wibowo	(Latvia) Agnese Blumberga (West Germany) Barbara Rittner	4–6, 6–4, 2–6
Loss	6.	10 June 1990	ITF Mantua, Italy	Clay	(Indonesia) Suzanna Wibowo	(Czechoslovakia) Ivana Jankovská (Czechoslovakia) Eva Melicharová	3–6, 5–7
Win	14.	12 August 1990	ITF Jakarta, Indonesia	Hard	(Indonesia) Suzanna Wibowo	(Indonesia) Irawati Moerid (Indonesia) Justi Kuswara	7–5, 6–3
Win	15.	28 October 1990	ITF Nagasaki, Japan	Hard	(Indonesia) Suzanna Wibowo	(Australia) Kerry-Anne Guse (Australia) Kristine Kunce	6–2, 7–6^{(8)}
Win	16.	4 November 1990	ITF Saga, Japan	Grass	(Indonesia) Suzanna Wibowo	(Australia) Kerry-Anne Guse (Australia) Kristine Kunce	6–3, 6–2
Win	17.	18 November 1990	ITF Nuriootpa, Australia	Hard	(Indonesia) Suzanna Wibowo	(Netherlands) Ingelise Driehuis (Australia) Louise Pleming	7–6, 6–1
Win	18.	20 February 2000	ITF Jakarta, Indonesia	Hard	(Indonesia) Irawati Iskandar	(South Korea) Choi Young-ja (South Korea) Kim Eun-sook	7–5, 7–5
Win	19.	27 February 2000	ITF Jakarta, Indonesia	Hard	(Indonesia) Wynne Prakusya	(Indonesia) Irawati Iskandar (Indonesia) Wukirasih Sawondari	6–4, 6–2
Win	20.	31 May 2008	ITF Bangkok, Thailand	Hard	(Australia) Tiffany Welford	(Russia) Elina Gasanova (Indonesia) Lavinia Tananta	2–6, 7–6^{(7)}, [10–4]
Win	21.	10 August 2008	ITF Hechingen, Germany	Clay	(Indonesia) Romana Tedjakusuma	(Germany) Carmen Klaschka (Croatia) Darija Jurak	2–6, 6–2, [10–6]
Loss	7.	19 October 2008	ITF Lawrenceville, United States	Hard	(Indonesia) Romana Tedjakusuma	(United States) Julie Ditty (United States) Carly Gullickson	6–3, 4–6, [10–12]
Win	22.	25 October 2008	ITF Augusta, United States	Hard	(Indonesia) Romana Tedjakusuma	(Argentina) Mailen Auroux (Brazil) Roxane Vaisemberg	6–3, 4–6, [10–5]
Win	23.	4 May 2009	ITF Balikpapan, Indonesia	Hard	(Indonesia) Romana Tedjakusuma	(Hong Kong) Zhang Ling (United Kingdom) Emily Webley-Smith	6–3, 6–3
Win	24.	31 May 2009	ITF Goyang, South Korea	Hard	(Indonesia) Romana Tedjakusuma	(China) Sun Shengnan (China) Lu Jingjing	6–7^{(5)}, 6–3, [10–8]
Win	25.	2 June 2009	ITF Gimhae, South Korea	Hard	(Indonesia) Romana Tedjakusuma	(China) Liang Chen (China) Sun Shengnan	7–5, 6–1
Loss	8.	28 September 2009	ITF Hamanako, Japan	Carpet	(Chinese Taipei) Hwang I-hsuan	(United States) Carly Gullickson (Australia) Nicole Kriz	6–4, 6–7, [5–10]
Loss	9.	2 November 2009	ITF Taipei, Taiwan	Hard (i)	(United States) Riza Zalameda	(Chinese Taipei) Chan Yung-jan (Chinese Taipei) Chuang Chia-jung	3–6, 6–3, [7–10]
Loss	10.	2 April 2010	ITF Monzón, Spain	Hard	(United States) Riza Zalameda	(Romania) Alexandra Dulgheru (Thailand) Tamarine Tanasugarn	2–6, 0–6
Loss	11.	5 June 2010	ITF Bukhara, Uzbekistan	Hard	(Indonesia) Jessy Rompies	(Georgia (country)) Tatia Mikadze (Georgia (country)) Sofia Shapatava	3–6, 3–6

== National representation ==
=== Multi-sport event (Individual) ===
Basuki made her debut in multi-sport event at the 1985 SEA Games, she won the women's singles bronze medal.

==== Singles: 5 (3 gold medals, 2 bronze medals) ====
Result	Date	Tournament	Surface	Opponent	Score
Bronze	December 1985	SEA Games, Bangkok	Hard	(Thailand) Sakolwan Kacharoen	
Gold	September 1987	SEA Games, Jakarta	Hard	(Indonesia) Suzanna Anggarkusuma	
Gold	August 1989	SEA Games, Kuala Lumpur	Hard	(Indonesia) Suzanna Anggarkusuma	
Bronze	October 1994	Asian Games, Hiroshima	Hard	(Japan) Kimiko Date	0–6, 7–5, 0–6
Gold	December 1998	Asian Games, Bangkok	Hard	(Thailand) Tamarine Tanasugarn	6–4, 6–2

==== Doubles: 6 (5 gold medals, 1 silver medal) ====
Result	Date	Tournament	Surface	Partner	Opponents	Score
Gold	October 1986	Asian Games, Seoul	Hard	(Indonesia) Suzanna Anggarkusuma	(South Korea) Lee Jeong-soon (South Korea) Kim Il-soon	
Gold	September 1987	SEA Games, Jakarta	Hard	(Indonesia) Suzanna Anggarkusuma	(Philippines) Dyan Castillejo (Philippines) Nina Castillejo	
Silver	August 1989	SEA Games, Kuala Lumpur	Hard	(Indonesia) Suzanna Anggarkusuma	(Indonesia) Waya Walalangi (Indonesia) Lukky Tedjamukti	
Gold	November 1990	Asian Games, Beijing	Hard	(Indonesia) Suzanna Wibowo	(South Korea) Lee Jeong-myung (South Korea) Kim Il-soon	
Gold	December 1995	SEA Games, Chiang Mai	Hard	(Indonesia) Romana Tedjakusuma	(Thailand) Tamarine Tanasugarn (Thailand) Suvimol Duangchan	
Gold	September 2001	SEA Games, Kuala Lumpur	Hard	(Indonesia) Wynne Prakusya	(Indonesia) Romana Tedjakusuma (Indonesia) Angelique Widjaja	6–2, 6–1

==== Mixed doubles: 3 (2 gold medals, 1 silver medal) ====
Result	Date	Tournament	Surface	Partner	Opponents	Score
Gold	November 1990	Asian Games, Beijing	Hard	(Indonesia) Hary Suharyadi	(South Korea) Yoo Jin-sun (South Korea) Kim Il-soon	
Gold	December 1995	SEA Games, Chiang Mai	Hard	(Indonesia) Sulistyo Wibowo	(Indonesia) Bonit Wiryawan (Indonesia) Romana Tedjakusuma	
Silver	September 2001	SEA Games, Kuala Lumpur	Hard	(Indonesia) Suwandi	(Indonesia) Bonit Wiryawan (Indonesia) Angelique Widjaja	w/o

== Performance timelines ==
Key
W	F	SF	QF	#R	RR	Q#	DNQ	A	NH

(W) winner; (F) finalist; (SF) semifinalist; (QF) quarterfinalist; (#R) rounds 4, 3, 2, 1; (RR) round-robin stage; (Q#) qualification round; (DNQ) did not qualify; (A) absent; (NH) not held; (SR) strike rate (events won / competed); (W–L) win–loss record.

=== Singles ===
Tournament	1986	1987	1988	1989	1990	1991	1992	1993	1994	1995	1996	1997	1998	1999	2000	Win–loss
Grand Slam tournaments
Australian Open	A	A	A	A	A	A	3R	1R	2R	3R	1R	2R	4R	1R	A	9–8
French Open	A	A	A	A	Q1	1R	A	2R	A	1R	3R	2R	1R	A	A	4–7
Wimbledon	A	A	A	A	Q2	3R	4R	4R	4R	4R	1R	QF	3R	A	3R	23–10
US Open	A	A	A	A	A	2R	1R	1R	1R	1R	1R	2R	1R	A	A	2–8
Grand Slam Win–loss	0–0	0–0	0–0	0–0	1–2	3–3	5–3	4–4	4–3	5–4	2–4	7–4	5–4	0–1	2–1	38–33
Olympic Games
Summer Olympics	Not held		1R	Not held			3R	Not held			1R	Not held			A	2–3
Career statistics
Tournaments won^{1}	0	0	0	2	2	2	1	2	2	0	0	0	0	0	0	N/A
Overall win–loss^{1}	2–3	5–6	21–13	17–5	18–12	27–12	18–16	21–16	23–14	20–12	22–18	30–22	11–16	0–1	3–5	243–184^{2}
Win %	40%	45%	62%	77%	60%	69%	53%	57%	62%	62%	55%	58%	41%	0%	37%	57%
Year-end ranking	unknown	488	284	377	266	35	48	43	29	24	26	21	56	unknown	264	N/A

- ^{1} includes ITF tournaments.
- ^{2} The sum of wins/losses by year records from the WTA website does not add up to the career record presented on the same website.

=== Doubles ===
Tournament	1986	1987	1988	1989	1990	1991	1992	1993	1994	1995	1996	1997	1998	1999	2000	2001	2002	2003	2004	2005	2006	2007	2008	2009	2010	2011	Win–loss
Grand Slam tournaments
Australian Open	A	A	A	A	A	1R	2R	3R	1R	1R	QF	2R	3R	QF	1R	1R	A	A	A	A	A	A	A	A	1R	A	12–12
French Open	A	A	A	A	A	2R	A	1R	A	1R	3R	QF	3R	A	A	A	A	A	A	A	A	A	A	A	A	A	8–6
Wimbledon	A	A	A	A	A	1R	2R	3R	3R	1R	QF	3R	3R	A	A	1R	A	A	A	A	A	A	A	A	A	A	13–9
US Open	A	A	A	A	A	QF	2R	SF	2R	1R	3R	QF	2R	A	A	1R	A	A	A	A	A	A	A	A	A	A	15–9
GS Win–loss	–	–	–	–	–	4–4	3–3	8–4	3–3	0–4	10–4	9–4	7–4	3–1	0–1	1–3	–	–	–	–	–	–	–	–	0–1	–	48–36
Olympic Games
Summer Olympics	Not held		A	Not held			1R	Not held			2R	Not held			1R	Not held			A	Not held			A	Not held			1–3
Career statistics
Tournaments won^{1}	4	4	1	3	5	0	0	2	1	0	2	2	0	0	3	1	0	0	0	0	0	0	3	3	0	0	34
Overall W–L^{1}	14–0	19–2	17–8	13–4	28–6	19–14	17–16	24–18	20–13	12–11	34–16	38–23	24–26	3–1	15–7	10–8	0–0	0–1	1–1	0–0	0–0	0–0	22–11	25–7	14–13	12–8	381–214 ^{2}
Win %	100%	90%	68%	76%	82%	58%	52%	57%	61%	52%	68%	62%	48%	75%	68%	56%	N/A	0%	50%	N/A	N/A	N/A	67%	78%	52%	60%	64%
Year-end ranking	unknown	unknown	unknown	284	173	46	56	41	38	53	20	15	19	unknown	139	90	–	–	unknown	–	–	–	287	191	160	352	N/A

- ^{1} includes ITF tournaments.
- ^{2} The sum of wins/losses by year records from the |WTA website does not add up to the career record presented on the same website.

=== Grand Slam mixed doubles ===
Tournament	1994	1995	1996	1997	1998	1999	2000	Win–loss
Australian Open	A	A	A	1R	1R	1R	2R	1–4
French Open	A	QF	2R	2R	2R	A	A	6–4
Wimbledon	3R	1R	1R	QF	1R	A	A	5–5
US Open	1R	1R	1R	2R	1R	A	A	1–5
Win–loss	2–2	3–3	1–3	5–4	1–4	0–1	1–1	13–18

== Career earnings ==
Year	Earnings (US$)	Money list rank
1986	$2,950	
1987	$3,775	
1988	$7,772	
1989	$6,600	
1990	$12,429	
1991	$92,631	55
1992	$111,748	50
1993	$168,118	38
1994	$141,290 #	
1995	$137,235	
1996	$254,784	28
1997	$385,824	19
1998	Unknown	31
1999	$15,134 #	
2000	$43,509 #	
2001	$30,710	
2003	$437	
2004	$50	2293
2008	$3,248	852
Career*	$1,648,297	118

* as of 12 April 2009
# does not include mixed-doubles earnings (which are included in the career total)

Awards
Preceded by (South Africa) Amanda Coetzer	Karen Krantzcke Sportsmanship Award; 1996	Succeeded by (South Africa) Amanda Coetzer
Preceded by (South Africa) Amanda Coetzer	Karen Krantzcke Sportsmanship Award; 1998	Succeeded by (Japan) Ai Sugiyama
