= Danamon Open =

Defunct tennis tournament
- Event name: Indonesian Championships (1993); Danamon Open (1994–97)
- Tour: WTA Tour (1993–97)
- Founded: 1993
- Abolished: 1997
- Editions: 5
- Surface: Hard (1993–97)

The Danamon Open is a defunct WTA Tour affiliated tennis tournament played from 1993 to 1997. It was held at the Gelora Senayan Stadium in Jakarta in Indonesia and was played on outdoor hardcourts.

== Finals ==
=== Singles ===
Year	Champion	Runner-up	Score
1993	(Indonesia) Yayuk Basuki	(United States) Ann Grossman	6–4, 6–4
1994	(Indonesia) Yayuk Basuki	(Argentina) Florencia Labat	6–4, 3–6, 7–6^{(7–1)}
1995	(Germany) Sabine Hack	(Romania) Irina Spîrlea	2–6, 7–6^{(8–6)}, 6–4
1996	(United States) Linda Wild	(Indonesia) Yayuk Basuki	walkover
1997	(Japan) Naoko Sawamatsu	(Japan) Yuka Yoshida	6–3, 6–2

=== Doubles ===
Year	Champions	Runners-up	Score
1993	(United States) Nicole Arendt (Australia) Kristine Radford	(United States) Amy deLone (United States) Erika deLone	6–3, 6–4
1994	(United States) Nicole Arendt (Australia) Kristine Radford	(Australia) Kerry-Anne Guse (Czech Republic) Andrea Strnadová	6–2, 6–2
1995	(Germany) Claudia Porwik (Romania) Irina Spîrlea	(Belgium) Laurence Courtois (Belgium) Nancy Feber	6–2, 6–3
1996	(Japan) Rika Hiraki (Japan) Naoko Kijimuta	(Belgium) Laurence Courtois (Belgium) Nancy Feber	7–6^{(7–2)}, 7–5
1997	(Australia) Kerry-Anne Guse (Australia) Kristine Radford	(Czech Republic) Lenka Němečková (Japan) Yuka Yoshida	6–4, 5–7, 7–5

== See also ==
- Jakarta Open – men's tournament
