= 1995 Wismilak Open – Singles =

Singles
- 1995 Wismilak Open

Final
- Champion: (Chinese Taipei) Wang Shi-ting
- Runner-up: (China) Yi Jing-Qian
- Score: 6–1, 6–1

Details
- Draw: 32 (2WC/4Q/3LL)
- Seeds: 8

Events
| Singles | Doubles |
| ← 1994 · | Commonwealth Bank Tennis Classic | · 1996 → |

Elena Wagner was the defending champion, but did not compete this year.

Wang Shi-ting won the title by defeating Yi Jing-Qian 6–1, 6–1 in the final.

== Seeds ==
1. (South Korea) Park Sung-hee (second round)
2. (Chinese Taipei) Wang Shi-ting (champion)
3. (n/a)
4. (France) Lea Ghirardi (second round)
5. (United States) Ann Grossman (first round)
6. (Romania) Cătălina Cristea (first round)
7. (France) Sarah Pitkowski (quarterfinals)
8. (Japan) Nana Miyagi (first round)

== Draw ==
=== Key ===
- Q = Qualifier
- WC = Wild card
- LL = Lucky loser
- Alt = Alternate
- SE = Special exempt
- PR = Protected ranking
- ITF = ITF entry
- JE = Junior exempt
- w/o = Walkover
- r = Retired
- d = Defaulted
- SR = Special ranking

=== Finals ===
Semifinals
(Slovenia) Tina Križan | 2 | 2
(China) Yi Jing-Qian | 6 | 6
(Australia) Annabel Ellwood | 0 | 2
2 | (Chinese Taipei) Wang Shi-ting | 6 | 6

Final
(China) Yi Jing-Qian | 1 | 1
2 | (Chinese Taipei) Wang Shi-ting | 6 | 6

=== Top half ===
First round
1 | (South Korea) S-h Park | 7 | 6
(Thailand) T Tanasugarn | 5 | 1
(Slovenia) T Križan | 6 | 6
LL | (Chinese Taipei) T-t Weng | 3 | 2
(Japan) R Hiraki | 3 | 2
(Ukraine) E Brioukhovets | 6 | 6
(Ukraine) E Tatarkova | 7 | 3 | 6
5 | (United States) A Grossman | 6 | 6 | 4
4 | (France) L Ghirardi | 6 | 6
(United States) S Reece | 3 | 2
(Monaco) E Gagliardi | 2 | 6 | 0
(China) F Li | 6 | 3 | 6
WC | (Indonesia) N Soetrisno | 6 | 6
WC | (Indonesia) M-V Widyadharma | 3 | 1
(China) J-Q Yi | 6 | 6
8 | (Japan) N Miyagi | 3 | 1

Second round
1 | (South Korea) S-h Park | 2 | 2
(Slovenia) T Križan | 6 | 6
(Ukraine) E Brioukhovets | 6 | 6
(Ukraine) E Tatarkova | 2 | 4
4 | (France) L Ghirardi | 1 | 1
(China) F Li | 6 | 6
WC | (Indonesia) N Soetrisno | 6 | 3 | 1
(China) J-Q Yi | 2 | 6 | 6

Quarterfinals
(Slovenia) T Križan | 6 | 6
(Ukraine) E Brioukhovets | 2 | 4
(China) F Li | 2 | 0
(China) J-Q Yi | 6 | 6

Semifinals
(Slovenia) T Križan | 2 | 2
(China) J-Q Yi | 6 | 6

=== Bottom half ===
First round
6 | (Romania) C Cristea | 4 | 1
(China) L Chen | 6 | 6
LL | (Australia) L Pleming | 3 | 1
(Australia) K Godridge | 6 | 6
(United States) E Rossides | 3 | 6
Q | (Thailand) B Sangaram | 6 | 7
(Australia) A Ellwood | 6 | 6
LL | (Indonesia) A Limanto | 2 | 3
7 | (France) S Pitkowski | 6 | 6
Q | (Netherlands) A Snijders | 3 | 3
(China) M Tang | 6 | 6
(Czech Republic) L Varmužová | 4 | 2
Q | (Japan) K Shibata | 1 | 6 | 6
(Australia) K Radford | 6 | 4 | 4
Q | (Australia) A Klim | 2 | 2
2 | (Chinese Taipei) S-t Wang | 6 | 6

Second round
(China) L Chen | 6 | 4 | 7
(Australia) K Godridge | 3 | 6 | 6
Q | (Thailand) B Sangaram | 3 | 1
(Australia) A Ellwood | 6 | 6
7 | (France) S Pitkowski | 1 | 6 | 6
(China) M Tang | 6 | 2 | 3
Q | (Japan) K Shibata | 3 | 2
2 | (Chinese Taipei) S-t Wang | 6 | 6

Quarterfinals
(China) L Chen | 3 | 1
(Australia) A Ellwood | 6 | 6
7 | (France) S Pitkowski | 4 | 5
2 | (Chinese Taipei) S-t Wang | 6 | 7

Semifinals
(Australia) A Ellwood | 0 | 2
2 | (Chinese Taipei) S-t Wang | 6 | 6
