= 1997 Wismilak International – Singles =

Singles
- 1997 Wismilak International
- 1996 Champion: (Chinese Taipei) Shi-Ting Wang

Final
- Champion: (Belgium) Dominique Van Roost
- Runner-up: (Czech Republic) Lenka Němečková
- Score: 6–1, 6–3

Details
- Draw: 32
- Seeds: 8

Events
Singles	Doubles
← 1996 ·	Wismilak International	· 1999 →

Shi-Ting Wang was the defending champion but lost in the first round to Maria Vento.

Dominique Van Roost won in the final 6–1, 6–3 against Lenka Němečková.

== Seeds ==
A champion seed is indicated in bold text while text in italics indicates the round in which that seed was eliminated.

1. (Belgium) **Dominique Van Roost (champion)**
2. (Slovakia) Henrieta Nagyová (second round)
3. (Thailand) Tamarine Tanasugarn (second round)
4. (Chinese Taipei) Shi-Ting Wang (first round)
5. (Japan) Yuka Yoshida (second round)
6. (France) Sarah Pitkowski (quarterfinals)
7. (Australia) Rachel McQuillan (semifinals)
8. (Czech Republic) Adriana Gerši (first round)

== Draw ==
=== Key ===
- Q = Qualifier
- WC = Wild card
- LL = Lucky loser
- Alt = Alternate
- ITF = ITF entry
- PR = Protected ranking
- SR = Special ranking
- SE = Special exempt
- JE = Junior exempt
- JR = Junior Accelerator Programme entrant
- CO = College Accelerator Programme entrant
- NG = Next Gen Accelerator Program entrant
- w/o = Walkover
- r = Retired
- d = Defaulted

First round
1	(Belgium) **D Van Roost**	**6**	**6**
Q	(Indonesia) W Prakusya	4	4
(Japan) **M Saeki**	**7**	**6**
(Australia) A Ellwood	6	3
Q	(Indonesia) M Chernovita	1	3
WC	(Madagascar) **D Randriantefy**	**6**	**6**
Q	(Canada) M Drake	6	1
5	(Japan) **Y Yoshida**	**7**	**6**
3	(Thailand) **T Tanasugarn**	6	**7**	**6**
(Japan) R Hiraki	**7**	5	4
(Australia) **N Pratt**	**6**	**6**
(Poland) A Olsza	3	1
(Japan) **N Miyagi**	**6**	**6**
(United States) J Watanabe	4	3
(Australia) S Drake-Brockman	2	3
7	(Australia) **R McQuillan**	**6**	**6**
6	(France) **S Pitkowski**	**6**	**3**
(Netherlands) S Noorlander	3	0	r
Q	(Japan) S Obata	0	2
(Australia) **K-A Guse**	**6**	**6**
(France) **N Dechy**	**6**	**6**
(South Korea) S-H Park	2	4
(Venezuela) **M Vento**	**6**	3	**6**
4	(Chinese Taipei) S-T Wang	4	**6**	4
8	(Czech Republic) A Gerši	3	**7**	1
(Czech Republic) **L Němečková**	**6**	6	**6**
WC	(United States) **E deLone**	**6**	**6**
(Japan) M Endo	3	2
(Germany) M Kochta	2	1
(Japan) **H Inoue**	**6**	**6**
(Spain) C Torrens Valero	2	2
2	(Slovakia) **H Nagyová**	**6**	**6**

Second round
1	(Belgium) **D Van Roost**	**7**	**6**
(Japan) M Saeki	6	3
WC	(Madagascar) **D Randriantefy**	**6**	**6**
5	(Japan) Y Yoshida	2	4
3	(Thailand) T Tanasugarn	5	2
(Australia) **N Pratt**	**7**	**6**
(Japan) N Miyagi	4	**7**	1
7	(Australia) **R McQuillan**	**6**	6	**6**
6	(France) **S Pitkowski**	**6**	4	**6**
(Australia) K-A Guse	3	**6**	3
(France) N Dechy	3	5
(Venezuela) **M Vento**	**6**	**7**
(Czech Republic) **L Němečková**	**6**	**3**
WC	(United States) E deLone	1	0	r
(Japan) **H Inoue**	**6**	5	**7**
2	(Slovakia) H Nagyová	3	**7**	5

Quarterfinals
1	(Belgium) **D Van Roost**	**6**	**6**
WC	(Madagascar) D Randriantefy	2	0
(Australia) N Pratt	**6**	2	2
7	(Australia) **R McQuillan**	3	**6**	**6**
6	(France) S Pitkowski	3	2
(Venezuela) **M Vento**	**6**	**6**
(Czech Republic) **L Němečková**	**6**	**6**
(Japan) H Inoue	2	3

Semifinals
1	(Belgium) **D Van Roost**	**6**	**7**
7	(Australia) R McQuillan	2	5
(Venezuela) M Vento	4	3
(Czech Republic) **L Němečková**	**6**	**6**

Final
1	(Belgium) **D Van Roost**	**6**	**6**
(Czech Republic) Lenka Němečková	1	3
