= 1995 Wismilak Open – Doubles =

Doubles
- 1995 Wismilak Open

Final
- Champions: (Netherlands) Petra Kamstra (Slovenia) Tina Križan
- Runners-up: (Japan) Nana Miyagi (United States) Stephanie Reece
- Score: 2–6, 6–4, 6–1

Events
Singles	Doubles
← 1994 ·	Commonwealth Bank Tennis Classic	· 1996 →

Yayuk Basuki and Romana Tedjakusuma were the defending champions, but none competed this year.

Petra Kamstra and Tina Križan won the title by defeating Nana Miyagi and Stephanie Reece 2–6, 6–4, 6–1 in the final.

== Seeds ==
1. (United States) Ann Grossman / (Australia) Kristine Radford (first round)
2. (Japan) Nana Miyagi / (United States) Stephanie Reece (final)
3. (United Kingdom) Valda Lake / (Australia) Louise Pleming (semifinals)
4. (South Korea) Park Sung-hee / (Chinese Taipei) Wang Shi-ting (first round)

== Draw ==
Key

- Q = Qualifier
- WC = Wild card
- LL = Lucky loser
- Alt = Alternate
- ITF = ITF entry
- PR = Protected ranking
- SR = Special ranking
- SE = Special exempt
- JE = Junior exempt
- JR = Junior Accelerator Programme entrant
- CO = College Accelerator Programme entrant
- NG = Next Gen Accelerator Program entrant
- w/o = Walkover
- r = Retired
- d = Defaulted

=== Draw ===
First round
1	(United States) A Grossman (Australia) K Radford	6	3	6
(France) L Ghirardi (France) S Pitkowski	4	6	7
(Netherlands) P Kamstra (Slovenia) T Križan	6	6
(China) M Tang (Czech Republic) L Varmužová	2	2
4	(South Korea) S-h Park (Chinese Taipei) S-t Wang	6	4	2
(Romania) C Cristea (Netherlands) A Snijders	1	6	6
(Ukraine) E Brioukhovets (Ukraine) E Tatarkova	6	6
(Monaco) E Gagliardi (Japan) K Shibata	4	2
(Malaysia) C-b Khoo (Chinese Taipei) T-t Weng	w	/	o
(Indonesia) Marieke Gunawan (Thailand) T Tanasugarn
(Australia) A Ellwood (United States) E Rossides	3	7	5
3	(United Kingdom) V Lake (Australia) L Pleming	6	5	7
(Australia) Lara Howes (Australia) A Klim	3	3
(Thailand) B Sangaram (Indonesia) N Soetrisno	6	6
(Indonesia) A Limanto (Indonesia) M-V Widyadharma	1	0
2	(Japan) N Miyagi (United States) S Reece	6	6

Quarterfinals
(France) L Ghirardi (France) S Pitkowski
(Netherlands) P Kamstra (Slovenia) T Križan	w	/	o
(Romania) C Cristea (Netherlands) A Snijders	4	2	r
(Ukraine) E Brioukhovets (Ukraine) E Tatarkova	6	4
(Malaysia) C-b Khoo (Chinese Taipei) T-t Weng	2	4
3	(United Kingdom) V Lake (Australia) L Pleming	6	6
(Thailand) B Sangaram (Indonesia) N Soetrisno	1	2
2	(Japan) N Miyagi (United States) S Reece	6	6

Semifinals
(Netherlands) P Kamstra (Slovenia) T Križan	w	/	o
(Ukraine) E Brioukhovets (Ukraine) E Tatarkova
3	(United Kingdom) V Lake (Australia) L Pleming	2	4
2	(Japan) N Miyagi (United States) S Reece	6	6

Final
(Netherlands) P Kamstra (Slovenia) T Križan	2	6	6
2	(Japan) N Miyagi (United States) S Reece	6	4	1
