= 1997 Wismilak International – Doubles =

Doubles
- 1997 Wismilak International
- 1996 Champions: (France) Alexandra Fusai (Australia) Kerry-Anne Guse

Final
- Champions: (Australia) Kerry-Anne Guse (Japan) Rika Hiraki
- Runners-up: (Canada) Maureen Drake (Canada) Renata Kolbovic
- Score: 6–1, 7–6

Details
- Draw: 16
- Seeds: 4

Events
Singles	Doubles
← 1996 ·	Wismilak International	· 1999 →

Alexandra Fusai and Kerry-Anne Guse were the defending champions but only Guse competed that year with Rika Hiraki.

Guse and Hiraki won in the final 6–1, 7–6 against Maureen Drake and Renata Kolbovic.

== Seeds ==
Champion seeds are indicated in bold text while text in italics indicates the round in which those seeds were eliminated.

1. (Australia) Rachel McQuillan / (Japan) Nana Miyagi (first round)
2. (Australia) **Kerry-Anne Guse** / (Japan) **Rika Hiraki (champions)**
3. (South Korea) Sung-Hee Park / (Chinese Taipei) Shi-Ting Wang (quarterfinals)
4. (Slovakia) Henrieta Nagyová / (Belgium) Dominique Van Roost (first round)

== Draw ==
=== Key ===
- Q = Qualifier
- WC = Wild card
- LL = Lucky loser
- Alt = Alternate
- ITF = ITF entry
- PR = Protected ranking
- SR = Special ranking
- SE = Special exempt
- JE = Junior exempt
- JR = Junior Accelerator Programme entrant
- CO = College Accelerator Programme entrant
- NG = Next Gen Accelerator Program entrant
- w/o = Walkover
- r = Retired
- d = Defaulted

First round
1	(Australia) R McQuillan (Japan) N Miyagi	1	4
Q	(Japan) **H Inoue** (Japan) **M Inoue**	**6**	**6**
(Australia) G Biggs (Hungary) N Köves	4	2
(Malaysia) **C-B Khoo** (Japan) **Y Yamagishi**	**6**	**6**
4	(Slovakia) H Nagyová (Belgium) D Van Roost
(United States) **E deLone** (Australia) **N Pratt**	**w/o**
WC	(Indonesia) W Prakusya (Indonesia) W Sawondari	5	6
(Canada) **M Drake** (Canada) **R Kolbovic**	**7**	**7**
(Australia) S Drake-Brockman (Australia) A Ellwood	**6**	2	3
(France) **N Dechy** (France) **S Pitkowski**	3	**6**	**6**
(Czech Republic) L Němečková (Poland) A Olsza	1	0
3	(South Korea) **S-H Park** (Chinese Taipei) **S-T Wang**	**6**	**6**
(Japan) M Endo (Germany) M Kochta	1	4
(Australia) **C Barclay** (Thailand) **T Tanasugarn**	**6**	**6**
(Australia) D Jones (Japan) S Obata	1	4
2	(Australia) **K-A Guse** (Japan) **R Hiraki**	**6**	**6**

Quarterfinals
(Japan) H Inoue (Japan) M Inoue	**7**	5	4
(Malaysia) **C-B Khoo** (Japan) **Y Yamagishi**	5	**7**	**6**
(United States) E deLone (Australia) N Pratt	**7**	3	5
(Canada) **M Drake** (Canada) **R Kolbovic**	5	**6**	**7**
(France) **N Dechy** (France) **S Pitkowski**	**6**	**6**
3	(South Korea) S-H Park (Chinese Taipei) S-T Wang	4	2
(Australia) C Barclay (Thailand) T Tanasugarn	4	2
2	(Australia) **K-A Guse** (Japan) **R Hiraki**	**6**	**6**

Semifinals
(Malaysia) C-B Khoo (Japan) Y Yamagishi	**7**	4	3
(Canada) **M Drake** (Canada) **R Kolbovic**	5	**6**	**6**
(France) N Dechy (France) S Pitkowski	6	**6**	2
2	(Australia) **K-A Guse** (Japan) **R Hiraki**	**7**	0	**6**

Final
(Canada) Maureen Drake (Canada) Renata Kolbovic	1	6
2	(Australia) **Kerry-Anne Guse** (Japan) **Rika Hiraki**	**6**	**7**
