= 1996 Wismilak International – Doubles =

Doubles
- 1996 Wismilak International
- 1995 Champions: (Netherlands) Petra Kamstra (Slovenia) Tina Križan

Final
- Champions: (France) Alexandra Fusai (Australia) Kerry-Anne Guse
- Runners-up: (Slovenia) Tina Križan (France) Noëlle van Lottum
- Score: 6–4, 6–4

Details
- Draw: 16
- Seeds: 4

Events
| Singles | Doubles |
| ← 1995 · | Wismilak International | · 1997 → |

Petra Kamstra and Tina Križan were the defending champions but only Križan competed that year with Noëlle van Lottum.

Križan and van Lottum lost in the final 6–4, 6–4 against Alexandra Fusai and Kerry-Anne Guse.

== Seeds ==
Champion seeds are indicated in bold text while text in italics indicates the round in which those seeds were eliminated.

1. (Japan) Rika Hiraki / (Japan) Nana Miyagi (semifinals)
2. (France) **Alexandra Fusai** / (Australia) **Kerry-Anne Guse (champions)**
3. (Slovakia) Janette Husárová / (France) Sandrine Testud (semifinals)
4. (South Korea) Sung-Hee Park / (Chinese Taipei) Shi-Ting Wang (first round)

== Draw ==
=== Key ===
- Q = Qualifier
- WC = Wild card
- LL = Lucky loser
- Alt = Alternate
- SE = Special exempt
- PR = Protected ranking
- ITF = ITF entry
- JE = Junior exempt
- w/o = Walkover
- r = Retired
- d = Defaulted
- SR = Special ranking

First round
1 | (Japan) **R Hiraki** (Japan) **N Miyagi** | **6** | 4 | **6**
(Japan) Y Hosoki (Japan) K Takuma | 3 | **6** | 3
Q | (Hungary) **P Gáspár** (Mexico) **A Gavaldón** | **7** | 5 | **7**
(Malaysia) C-B Khoo (Chinese Taipei) T-T Weng | 5 | **7** | 5
4 | (South Korea) S-H Park (Chinese Taipei) S-T Wang | 5 | 2
(Slovenia) **T Križan** (France) **N van Lottum** | **7** | **6**
(Germany) **S Meier** (France) **S Pitkowski** | 2 | **6** | **6**
(South Korea) M-R Jeon (Thailand) T Tanasugarn | **6** | 4 | 1
(Australia) A Ellwood (Australia) L Pleming | **6** | 4 | 3
(Japan) **M Saeki** (Thailand) **B Sangaram** | 2 | **6** | **6**
(Austria) M Schnell (Italy) A Serra Zanetti | 2 | 5
3 | (Slovakia) **J Husárová** (France) **S Testud** | **6** | **7**
LL | (France) N Dechy (Germany) S Klösel | 4 | **7** | 1
(Czech Republic) **A Gerši** (Czech Republic) **L Richterová** | **6** | 6 | **6**
WC | (Indonesia) A Limanto (Indonesia) W Prakusya | 1 | 5
2 | (France) **A Fusai** (Australia) **K-A Guse** | **6** | **7**

Quarterfinals
1 | (Japan) **R Hiraki** (Japan) **N Miyagi** | **w/o**
Q | (Hungary) P Gáspár (Mexico) A Gavaldón
(Slovenia) **T Križan** (France) **N van Lottum** | **w/o**
(Germany) S Meier (France) S Pitkowski
(Japan) M Saeki (Thailand) B Sangaram | 3 | 4
3 | (Slovakia) **J Husárová** (France) **S Testud** | **6** | **6**
(Czech Republic) A Gerši (Czech Republic) L Richterová
2 | (France) **A Fusai** (Australia) **K-A Guse** | **w/o**

Semifinals
1 | (Japan) R Hiraki (Japan) N Miyagi | **6** | 4 | 2
(Slovenia) **T Križan** (France) **N van Lottum** | 2 | **6** | **6**
3 | (Slovakia) J Husárová (France) S Testud | 1 | 0
2 | (France) **A Fusai** (Australia) **K-A Guse** | **6** | **6**

Final
(Slovenia) Tina Križan (France) Noëlle van Lottum | 4 | 4
2 | (France) **Alexandra Fusai** (Australia) **Kerry-Anne Guse** | **6** | **6**
