= 1995 Wismilak Open =

- Date: 2–8 October
- Edition: 2nd
- Category: Tier IV
- Draw: 32S / 16D
- Prize money: $107,500
- Surface: Hard / outdoor
- Location: Surabaya, Indonesia
- Venue: Embong Sawo Sports Club

Champions

Singles
- (Chinese Taipei) Shi-Ting Wang

Doubles
- (Netherlands) Petra Kamstra / (Slovenia) Tina Križan
← 1994 ·	Wismilak International	· 1996 →

The 1995 Wismilak Open, also known as the Surabaya Women's Open, was a women's tennis tournament played on outdoor hard courts at the Embong Sawo Sports Club in Surabaya, Indonesia that was part of Tier IV of the 1995 WTA Tour. It was the second edition of the tournament and was held from 2 October until 8 October 1995. Second-seeded Shi-Ting Wang won the singles title.

== Finals ==
=== Singles ===
(Chinese Taipei) Shi-Ting Wang defeated (China) Jing-Qian Yi 6–1, 6–1

- It was Wang's first singles title of the year and the fourth of her career.

=== Doubles ===
(Netherlands) Petra Kamstra / (Slovenia) Tina Križan defeated (Japan) Nana Miyagi / (United States) Stephanie Reece 2–6, 6–4, 6–1

- It was Kamstra's only doubles title of her career. It was Križan's first doubles title of her career.
