= 2006 Wismilak International =

- Date: September 11–17
- Edition: 12th
- Category: Tier III Series
- Surface: Hard / outdoor
- Location: Bali, Indonesia

Champions

Singles
- (Russia) Svetlana Kuznetsova

Doubles
- (United States) Lindsay Davenport / (United States) Corina Morariu
← 2005 ·	Commonwealth Bank Tennis Classic	· 2007 →

The 2006 Commonwealth Bank Tennis Classic was a women's tennis tournament played on outdoor hard courts. It was the 12th edition of the Commonwealth Bank Tennis Classic, and was part of the Tier III Series of the 2006 WTA Tour. It took place at the Grand Hyatt Bali in Bali, Indonesia, from 11 through 17 September 2007.

== Finals ==
=== Singles ===
- (Russia) Svetlana Kuznetsova defeated (France) Marion Bartoli, 7–5, 6–2

It was the 2nd title of the season for Kuznetsova and the 7th title in her singles career.

=== Doubles ===
- (United States) Lindsay Davenport / (United States) Corina Morariu defeated (South Africa) Natalie Grandin / (Australia) Trudi Musgrave, 6–3, 6–4

It was the 36th title for Davenport and the 13th title for Morariu in their respective doubles careers.

== Points and prize money ==
=== Point distribution ===
Event	W	F	SF	QF	Round of 16	Round of 32	Q	Q2	Q1
Singles	145	103	66	37	19	1	4.5	2.75	1
Doubles	145	103	66	37	1	—	—	—	—

=== Prize money ===
Event	W	F	SF	QF	Round of 16	Round of 32	Q2	Q1
Singles	$35,000	$19,000	$10,300	$5,615	$3,050	$1,665	$900	$490
Doubles *	$10,500	$5,700	$3,100	$1,685	$915	—	—	—

_{* per team}

== Singles main-draw entrants ==
=== Seeds ===
Country	Player	Rank^{1}	Seed
RUS	Svetlana Kuznetsova	7	1
SUI	Patty Schnyder	8	2
USA	Lindsay Davenport	11	3
SCG	Ana Ivanovic	17	4
SVK	Daniela Hantuchová	18	5
FRA	Marion Bartoli	25	6
~~ITA~~	~~Maria Elena Camerin~~	~~45~~	~~7~~
FRA	Séverine Brémond	66	8
JPN	Aiko Nakamura	76	9

^{1} Rankings as of 28 August 2006.

=== Other entrants ===
The following players received wildcards into the singles main draw:

- (South Korea) Kim So-jung
- (Venezuela) María Vento-Kabchi
- (Indonesia) Angelique Widjaja

The following players received entry from the qualifying draw:

- (Indonesia) Ayu Fani Damayanti
- (Indonesia) Sandy Gumulya
- (Slovenia) Andreja Klepač
- (Australia) Trudi Musgrave

The following players received entry as lucky losers:

- (Indonesia) Vivien Silfany
- (Indonesia) Lavinia Tananta

=== Withdrawals ===
- (Italy) Maria Elena Camerin (left leg injury)
- (Tunisia) Selima Sfar (left leg injury)

== Doubles main-draw entrants ==
=== Seeds ===
Country	Player	Country	Player	Rank^{1}	Seed
VEN	María Vento-Kabchi	INA	Angelique Widjaja	217	1
RSA	Natalie Grandin	AUS	Trudi Musgrave	234	2
HUN	Melinda Czink	IND	Shikha Uberoi	262	3
FRA	Séverine Brémond	RUS	Galina Voskoboeva	269	4

^{1} Rankings as of 28 August 2006.
