= 1996 Wismilak International – Singles =

Singles
- 1996 Wismilak International
- 1995 Champion: (Chinese Taipei) Shi-Ting Wang

Final
- Champion: (Chinese Taipei) Shi-Ting Wang
- Runner-up: (Japan) Nana Miyagi
- Score: 6–4, 6–0

Details
- Draw: 32
- Seeds: 8

Events
Singles	Doubles
← 1995 ·	Wismilak International	· 1997 →

Shi-Ting Wang was the defending champion and won in the final 6–4, 6–0 against Nana Miyagi.

== Seeds ==
A champion seed is indicated in bold text while text in italics indicates the round in which that seed was eliminated.

1. (France) Sandrine Testud (second round)
2. (Chinese Taipei) **Shi-Ting Wang (champion)**
3. (France) Alexandra Fusai (first round)
4. (Japan) Nana Miyagi (final)
5. (France) Sarah Pitkowski (quarterfinals)
6. (Czech Republic) Ludmila Richterová (quarterfinals)
7. (Italy) Francesca Lubiani (first round)
8. (France) Nathalie Dechy (quarterfinals)

== Draw ==
=== Key ===
- Q = Qualifier
- WC = Wild card
- LL = Lucky loser
- Alt = Alternate
- SE = Special exempt
- PR = Protected ranking
- ITF = ITF entry
- JE = Junior exempt
- w/o = Walkover
- r = Retired
- d = Defaulted
- SR = Special ranking

First round
1	(France) **S Testud**	**6**	**6**
(Slovenia) T Križan	0	1
(Hungary) P Gáspár	5	2
(Czech Republic) **A Gerši**	**7**	**6**
(Australia) K-A Guse	1	3
(Italy) **A Serra Zanetti**	**6**	**6**
WC	(United Kingdom) M Javer	3	1
6	(Czech Republic) **L Richterová**	**6**	**6**
4	(Japan) **N Miyagi**	3	**6**	**6**
(France) N van Lottum	**6**	1	1
WC	(Indonesia) W Prakusya	3	**6**	1
(South Korea) **S-H Park**	**6**	4	**6**
(Slovakia) **J Husárová**	**6**	6	**6**
Q	(Japan) K Shibata	2	**7**	3
Q	(Mexico) A Gavaldón	6	4
8	(France) **N Dechy**	**7**	**6**
7	(Italy) F Lubiani	6	2
Q	(Chinese Taipei) **T-T Weng**	**7**	**6**
(South Korea) M-R Jeon	3	4
Q	(Japan) **H Inoue**	**6**	**6**
(Japan) **Y Yoshida**	**7**	**6**
(Australia) A Ellwood	5	4
(Japan) **R Hiraki**	**6**	**6**
3	(France) A Fusai	2	4
5	(France) **S Pitkowski**	**6**	**6**
(France) A Dechaume-Balleret	2	2
(Germany) S Klösel	2	3
(Thailand) **T Tanasugarn**	**6**	**6**
(Austria) M Schnell	6	1
(Japan) **M Saeki**	**7**	**6**
LL	(Israel) H Rosen	5	3
2	(Chinese Taipei) **S-T Wang**	**7**	**6**

Second round
1	(France) S Testud	4	4
(Czech Republic) **A Gerši**	**6**	**6**
(Italy) A Serra Zanetti	6	4
6	(Czech Republic) **L Richterová**	**7**	**6**
4	(Japan) **N Miyagi**	**6**	3	**6**
(South Korea) S-H Park	4	**6**	4
(Slovakia) J Husárová	5	1
8	(France) **N Dechy**	**7**	**6**
Q	(Chinese Taipei) T-T Weng	0	1
Q	(Japan) **H Inoue**	**6**	**6**
(Japan) **Y Yoshida**	**6**	**4**
(Japan) R Hiraki	3	3	r
5	(France) **S Pitkowski**	**6**	1	**6**
(Thailand) T Tanasugarn	2	**6**	3
(Japan) M Saeki	3	2
2	(Chinese Taipei) **S-T Wang**	**6**	**6**

Quarterfinals
(Czech Republic) **A Gerši**	**6**	**6**
6	(Czech Republic) L Richterová	1	1
4	(Japan) **N Miyagi**	**6**	4	**6**
8	(France) N Dechy	1	**6**	3
Q	(Japan) H Inoue	2	4
(Japan) **Y Yoshida**	**6**	**6**
5	(France) S Pitkowski	6	3
2	(Chinese Taipei) **S-T Wang**	**7**	**6**

Semifinals
(Czech Republic) A Gerši	5	2
4	(Japan) **N Miyagi**	**7**	**6**
(Japan) Y Yoshida	2	4
2	(Chinese Taipei) **S-T Wang**	**6**	**6**

Final
4	(Japan) Nana Miyagi	4	0
2	(Chinese Taipei) **Shi-Ting Wang**	**6**	**6**
