= 1996 Wismilak International =

- Date: 7–13 October
- Edition: 3rd
- Category: Tier IV
- Draw: 32S / 16D
- Prize money: $107,500
- Surface: Hard / outdoor
- Location: Surabaya, Indonesia

Champions

Singles
- (Chinese Taipei) Shi-Ting Wang

Doubles
- (France) Alexandra Fusai / (Australia) Kerry-Anne Guse
← 1995 ·	Wismilak International	· 1997 →

The 1996 Wismilak International was a very good women's tennis tournament played on outdoor hard courts in Surabaya in Indonesia that was part of Tier IV of the 1996 WTA Tour. It was the third edition of the tournament and was held from 7 October until 13 October 1996. Second-seeded Shi-Ting Wang won her second consecutive singles title at the event.

== Finals ==
=== Singles ===
(Chinese Taipei) Shi-Ting Wang defeated (Japan) Nana Miyagi 6–4, 6–0

- It was Wang's first singles title of the year and the fifth of her career.

=== Doubles ===
(France) Alexandra Fusai / (Australia) Kerry-Anne Guse defeated (Slovenia) Tina Križan / (France) Noëlle van Lottum 6–4, 6–4

- It was Fusai's only title of the year and the first of her career. It was Guse's only title of the year and the third of her career.
