= 1994 Surabaya Women's Open – Doubles =

Doubles
- 1994 Surabaya Women's Open

Final
- Champions: (Indonesia) Yayuk Basuki (Indonesia) Romana Tedjakusuma
- Runners-up: (Japan) Kyōko Nagatsuka (Japan) Ai Sugiyama
- Score: Walkover

Details
- Draw: 16
- Seeds: 4

Events
Singles	Doubles
Commonwealth Bank Tennis Classic	· 1995 →

In the first edition of the tournament, Yayuk Basuki and Romana Tedjakusuma won the title by walkover, as Ai Sugiyama (one of their opponents) was injured during the singles final, which was played previously.

== Seeds ==
1. (South Africa) Mariaan de Swardt / (Australia) Kerry-Anne Guse (quarterfinals)
2. (Japan) Kyōko Nagatsuka / (Japan) Ai Sugiyama (final, withdrew)
3. (Australia) Michelle Jaggard-Lai / (Canada) Rene Simpson-Alter (semifinals)
4. (Slovakia) Janette Husárová / (Belgium) Dominique Monami (quarterfinals)

== Draw ==
=== Key ===
- Q = Qualifier
- WC = Wild card
- LL = Lucky loser
- Alt = Alternate
- SE = Special exempt
- PR = Protected ranking
- ITF = ITF entry
- JE = Junior exempt
- w/o = Walkover
- r = Retired
- d = Defaulted
- SR = Special ranking

=== Draw ===
First round
1	(South Africa) M de Swardt (Australia) KA Guse	6	6
(Indonesia) L Andriyani (Czech Republic) L Varmužová	1	1
(Czech Republic) P Rajzlová (Austria) M Schnell	7	6	6
Q	(Germany) P Begerow (Czech Republic) L Richterová	6	7	4
4	(Slovakia) J Husárová (Belgium) D Monami	6	7
WC	(Indonesia) A Limanto (Indonesia) M-V Widyadharma	4	5
(Belgium) N Feber (Slovakia) K Studeníková	3	1
(Indonesia) Y Basuki (Indonesia) R Tedjakusuma	6	6
(Germany) V Martinek (Bulgaria) E Wagner	2	6	3
(France) A Fusai (Japan) M Miyauchi	6	4	6
(South Korea) S-h Park (Indonesia) N Soetrisno	3	2
3	(Australia) M Jaggard-Lai (Canada) R Simpson-Alter	6	6
(Italy) R Grande (Germany) M Živec-Škulj	7	6
(Australia) K Godridge (Germany) P Winzenhöller	6	3
(Russia) T Panova (Indonesia) S Anggarkusuma	3	6
2	(Japan) K Nagatsuka (Japan) A Sugiyama	6	7

Quarterfinals
1	(South Africa) M de Swardt (Australia) KA Guse	6	4	6
(Czech Republic) P Rajzlová (Austria) M Schnell	1	6	7
4	(Slovakia) J Husárová (Belgium) D Monami	2	3
(Indonesia) Y Basuki (Indonesia) R Tedjakusuma	6	6
(France) A Fusai (Japan) M Miyauchi	6	3	3
3	(Australia) M Jaggard-Lai (Canada) R Simpson-Alter	4	6	6
(Italy) R Grande (Germany) M Živec-Škulj	2	4
2	(Japan) K Nagatsuka (Japan) A Sugiyama	6	6

Semifinals
(Czech Republic) P Rajzlová (Austria) M Schnell	5	1
(Indonesia) Y Basuki (Indonesia) R Tedjakusuma	7	6
3	(Australia) M Jaggard-Lai (Canada) R Simpson-Alter	4	3
2	(Japan) K Nagatsuka (Japan) A Sugiyama	6	6

Final
(Indonesia) Y Basuki (Indonesia) R Tedjakusuma	w/o
2	(Japan) K Nagatsuka (Japan) A Sugiyama
