= 1994 Surabaya Women's Open – Singles =

Singles
- 1994 Surabaya Women's Open

Final
- Champion: (Bulgaria) Elena Wagner
- Runner-up: (Japan) Ai Sugiyama
- Score: 2–6, 6–0, retired

Details
- Draw: 32
- Seeds: 8

Events
Singles	Doubles
Commonwealth Bank Tennis Classic	· 1995 →

In the first edition of the tournament, Elena Wagner won the title after her opponent Ai Sugiyama was forced to retire before the start of the third set.

== Seeds ==
1. (Indonesia) Yayuk Basuki (second round)
2. (Chinese Taipei) Wang Shi-ting (second round)
3. (France) Alexandra Fusai (first round)
4. (Japan) Kyōko Nagatsuka (first round)
5. (Germany) Veronika Martinek (second round, retired)
6. (Austria) Barbara Schett (first round, retired)
7. (Czech Republic) Radka Bobková (quarterfinals)
8. (Japan) Ai Sugiyama (final, retired)

== Draw ==
=== Key ===
- Q = Qualifier
- WC = Wild card
- LL = Lucky loser
- Alt = Alternate
- SE = Special exempt
- PR = Protected ranking
- ITF = ITF entry
- JE = Junior exempt
- w/o = Walkover
- r = Retired
- d = Defaulted
- SR = Special ranking

=== Finals ===
Semifinals
(Bulgaria) Elena Wagner	6	6
(Australia) Michelle Jaggard-Lai	1	2
8	(Japan) Ai Sugiyama	6	4	6
(South Korea) Park Sung-hee	3	6	3

Final
(Bulgaria) Elena Wagner	2	6	0
8	(Japan) Ai Sugiyama	6	0	0^{r}

=== Top half ===
First round
1	(Indonesia) Y Basuki	6	7
(South Africa) M de Swardt	4	5
(Belgium) N Feber	4	2
(Bulgaria) E Wagner	6	6
Q	(Czech Republic) L Varmužová	6	6
Q	(Australia) K Godridge	3	4
Q	(Australia) KA Guse	6	6	1
7	(Czech Republic) R Bobková	7	3	6
4	(Japan) K Nagatsuka	5	4
(Australia) M Jaggard-Lai	7	6
(Indonesia) R Tedjakusuma	7	6
(Japan) N Kijimuta	6	4
(Germany) P Winzenhöller	4	3
(Slovakia) K Studeníková	6	6
(Austria) B Paulus	7	0
6	(Austria) B Schett	6	0^{r}

Second round
1	(Indonesia) Y Basuki	7	0	2
(Bulgaria) E Wagner	6	6	6
Q	(Czech Republic) L Varmužová	2	0^{r}
7	(Czech Republic) R Bobková	6	0
(Australia) M Jaggard-Lai	6	6
(Indonesia) R Tedjakusuma	4	1
(Slovakia) K Studeníková	6	6
(Austria) B Paulus	2	3

Quarterfinals
(Bulgaria) E Wagner	6	7
7	(Czech Republic) R Bobková	2	5
(Australia) M Jaggard-Lai	7	7
(Slovakia) K Studeníková	5	6

Semifinals
(Bulgaria) E Wagner	6	6
(Australia) M Jaggard-Lai	1	2

=== Bottom half ===
First round
8	(Japan) A Sugiyama	3	6	6
(Belgium) D Monami	6	2	4
(Germany) M Živec-Škulj	6	6
WC	(Indonesia) N Soetrisno	1	3
(Japan) M Miyauchi	0	3
Q	(Canada) R Simpson-Alter	6	6
(Slovakia) J Husárová	6	6	6
3	(France) A Fusai	7	3	4
5	(Germany) V Martinek	6	6
WC	(Indonesia) M Chernovita	0	0
(Czech Republic) L Richterová	6	4	3
(Germany) P Begerow	3	6	6
(Italy) R Grande	6	2
(South Korea) S-h Park	7	6
(Russia) T Panova	1	4
2	(Chinese Taipei) S-t Wang	6	6

Second round
8	(Japan) A Sugiyama	6	5	6
(Germany) M Živec-Škulj	2	7	2
Q	(Canada) R Simpson-Alter	1	6	1
(Slovakia) J Husárová	6	1	6
5	(Germany) V Martinek	7	6	0^{r}
(Germany) P Begerow	5	7	4
(South Korea) S-h Park	7	0	6
2	(Chinese Taipei) S-t Wang	5	6	3

Quarterfinals
8	(Japan) A Sugiyama	7	6
(Slovakia) J Husárová	5	3
(Germany) P Begerow	2	2
(South Korea) S-h Park	6	6

Semifinals
8	(Japan) A Sugiyama	6	4	6
(South Korea) S-h Park	3	6	3
