= 2007 Commonwealth Bank Tennis Classic – Singles =

Singles
- 2007 Commonwealth Bank Tennis Classic

Final
- Champion: (United States) Lindsay Davenport
- Runner-up: (Slovakia) Daniela Hantuchová
- Score: 6–4, 3–6, 6–2

Events
Singles	Doubles
← 2006 ·	Commonwealth Bank Tennis Classic	· 2008 →

Svetlana Kuznetsova was the defending champion, but chose not to play that year.

Lindsay Davenport won the title, beating Daniela Hantuchová 6–4, 3–6, 6–2 in the final. It was her first tournament in 51 weeks.

== Seeds ==
The top two seeds received a bye into the second round.

1. (Serbia) Jelena Janković (quarterfinals)
2. (Slovakia) Daniela Hantuchová (final)
3. (Switzerland) Patty Schnyder (second round)
4. (Spain) Anabel Medina Garrigues (second round)
5. (Greece) Eleni Daniilidou (first round)
6. (Germany) Martina Müller (second round)
7. (Japan) Aiko Nakamura (quarterfinals)
8. (Russia) Yaroslava Shvedova (first round)

== Draw ==
=== Key ===
- Q = Qualifier
- WC = Wild card
- LL = Lucky loser
- Alt = Alternate
- SE = Special exempt
- PR = Protected ranking
- ITF = ITF entry
- JE = Junior exempt
- w/o = Walkover
- r = Retired
- d = Defaulted
- SR = Special ranking

=== Finals ===
Semifinals
PR	(United States) Lindsay Davenport	6	6
(Italy) Sara Errani	1	3
Q	(Romania) Sorana Cîrstea	5	1
2	(Slovakia) Daniela Hantuchová	7	6

Final
PR	(United States) Lindsay Davenport	6	3	6
2	(Slovakia) Daniela Hantuchová	4	6	2

=== Top half ===
First round
(Denmark) C Wozniacki	6	1	3
(Australia) C Dellacqua	1	6	6
(Czech Republic) H Šromová	2	1
Q	(United States) J Ditty	6	6
PR	(United States) L Davenport	6	6
5	(Greece) E Daniilidou	2	2
4	(Spain) A Medina Garrigues	6	6
WC	(Indonesia) S Gumulya	1	1
(Uzbekistan) A Amanmuradova	3	7	6^{4}
(Italy) S Errani	6	6^{1}	7
(France) Y Fedossova	6	6
(Chinese Taipei) S-w Hsieh	0	0
(Thailand) T Tanasugarn	1	7	5
7	(Japan) A Nakamura	6	6^{5}	7

Second round
1	(Serbia) J Janković	6	6
(Australia) C Dellacqua	4	4
Q	(United States) J Ditty	1	4
PR	(United States) L Davenport	6	6
4	(Spain) A Medina Garrigues	5	6	4
(Italy) S Errani	7	4	6
(France) Y Fedossova	2	2
7	(Japan) A Nakamura	6	6

Quarterfinals
1	(Serbia) J Janković	4	6	2
PR	(United States) L Davenport	6	2	6
(Italy) S Errani	6	6
7	(Japan) A Nakamura	1	2

Semifinals
PR	(United States) L Davenport	6	6
(Italy) S Errani	1	3

=== Bottom half ===
First round
8	(Russia) Y Shvedova	0	1
Q	(China) M Yuan	6	6
(Slovakia) J Gajdošová	1	0
(Romania) E Gallovits	6	6
Q	(Romania) S Cîrstea	6	6
(Russia) A Rodionova	2	4
(China) S Zhang	4	2
3	(Switzerland) P Schnyder	6	6
6	(Germany) M Müller	6	6
(Belarus) T Poutchek	3	3
Q	(Japan) A Morita	6	6
WC	(New Zealand) M Erakovic	4	4
(United States) J Craybas	6	6^{4}	2
WC	(Netherlands) E Tamaëla	4	7	6

Second round
Q	(China) M Yuan	2	4
(Romania) E Gallovits	6	6
Q	(Romania) S Cîrstea	6	5	7
3	(Switzerland) P Schnyder	2	7	5
6	(Germany) M Müller	4	0
Q	(Japan) A Morita	6	6
WC	(Netherlands) E Tamaëla	5	3
2	(Slovakia) D Hantuchová	7	6

Quarterfinals
(Romania) E Gallovits	6	4	6^{3}
Q	(Romania) S Cîrstea	3	6	7
Q	(Japan) A Morita	2	1
2	(Slovakia) D Hantuchová	6	6

Semifinals
Q	(Romania) S Cîrstea	5	1
2	(Slovakia) D Hantuchová	7	6
