= 2006 Wismilak International – Doubles =

Doubles
- 2006 Wismilak International

Final
- Champions: (United States) Lindsay Davenport (United States) Corina Morariu
- Runners-up: (South Africa) Natalie Grandin (Australia) Trudi Musgrave
- Score: 6–3, 6–4

Events
Singles	Doubles
← 2005 ·	Commonwealth Bank Tennis Classic	· 2007 →

Anna-Lena Grönefeld and Meghann Shaughnessy were the defending champions, but none competed this year.

Lindsay Davenport and Corina Morariu won the title by defeating Natalie Grandin and Trudi Musgrave 6–3, 6–4 in the final.

== Seeds ==
The top three seeds received a bye into the second round.

1. (Venezuela) María Vento-Kabchi / (Indonesia) Angelique Widjaja (semifinals)
2. (South Africa) Natalie Grandin / (Australia) Trudi Musgrave (final)
3. (Hungary) Melinda Czink / (India) Shikha Uberoi (quarterfinals)
4. (France) Séverine Brémond / (Russia) Galina Voskoboeva (quarterfinals)

== Draw ==
=== Key ===
- Q = Qualifier
- WC = Wild card
- LL = Lucky loser
- Alt = Alternate
- ITF = ITF entry
- PR = Protected ranking
- SR = Special ranking
- SE = Special exempt
- JE = Junior exempt
- JR = Junior Accelerator Programme entrant
- CO = College Accelerator Programme entrant
- NG = Next Gen Accelerator Program entrant
- w/o = Walkover
- r = Retired
- d = Defaulted

=== Draw ===
First round
(Indonesia) L-A Budiharto (Singapore) Lee Wei-ping	2	0
(Indonesia) V Silfany (Indonesia) L Tananta	6	6
4	(France) S Brémond (Russia) G Voskoboeva	7^{7}	6
(Netherlands) K Kilsdonk (Netherlands) E Tamaëla	6^{2}	4
(United States) L Davenport (United States) C Morariu	6	6
(Australia) C Dellacqua (United States) S Rao	3	1
(Slovenia) A Klepač (Czech Republic) H Šromová	1	3
(Japan) A Morigami (Japan) A Nakamura	6	6
(Indonesia) AF Damayanti (Indonesia) S Gumulya	6	6
(Indonesia) B Gumulya (Indonesia) J Rompies	1	1

Quarterfinals
1	(Venezuela) M Vento-Kabchi (Indonesia) A Widjaja	6	6
(Indonesia) V Silfany (Indonesia) L Tananta	4	4
4	(France) S Brémond (Russia) G Voskoboeva	6^{3}	1
(United States) L Davenport (United States) C Morariu	7^{7}	6
(Japan) A Morigami (Japan) A Nakamura	7	3	6
3	(Hungary) M Czink (India) S Uberoi	5	6	3
(Indonesia) AF Damayanti (Indonesia) S Gumulya	3	1
2	(South Africa) N Grandin (Australia) T Musgrave	6	6

Semifinals
1	(Venezuela) M Vento-Kabchi (Indonesia) A Widjaja	3	2
(United States) L Davenport (United States) C Morariu	6	6
(Japan) A Morigami (Japan) A Nakamura	6^{5}	3
2	(South Africa) N Grandin (Australia) T Musgrave	7^{7}	6

Final
(United States) L Davenport (United States) C Morariu	6	6
2	(South Africa) N Grandin (Australia) T Musgrave	3	4
