= 2008 Commonwealth Bank Tennis Classic – Singles =

Singles
- 2008 Commonwealth Bank Tennis Classic

Final
- Champion: (Switzerland) Patty Schnyder
- Runner-up: (Austria) Tamira Paszek
- Score: 6–3, 6–0

Details
- Draw: 30
- Seeds: 8

Events
Singles	Doubles
← 2007 ·	Commonwealth Bank Tennis Classic

Lindsay Davenport was the defending champion, but chose not to participate that year.

Patty Schnyder won in the final 6–3, 6–0, against Tamira Paszek.

== Seeds ==
The top two seeds received a bye into the second round.

1. (Slovakia) Daniela Hantuchová (semifinals)
2. (Switzerland) Patty Schnyder (champion)
3. (Italy) Flavia Pennetta (quarterfinals)
4. (Russia) Nadia Petrova (semifinals)
5. (Italy) Francesca Schiavone (quarterfinals)
6. (China) Li Na (withdrew due to a right knee injury)
7. (Italy) Sara Errani (second round)
8. (Canada) Aleksandra Wozniak (first round)
9. (China) Peng Shuai (second round)

== Draw ==
=== Key ===
- Q = Qualifier
- WC = Wild card
- LL = Lucky loser
- Alt = Alternate
- SE = Special exempt
- PR = Protected ranking
- ITF = ITF entry
- JE = Junior exempt
- w/o = Walkover
- r = Retired
- d = Defaulted
- SR = Special ranking

=== Finals ===
Semifinals
1	(Slovakia) Daniela Hantuchová	2	7	4
(Austria) Tamira Paszek	6	5	6
4	(Russia) Nadia Petrova	5	1
2	(Switzerland) Patty Schnyder	7	6

Final
(Austria) Tamira Paszek	3	0
2	(Switzerland) Patty Schnyder	6	6

=== Top half ===
First round
Q	(Ukraine) O Savchuk	7	6
(Russia) A Kudryavtseva	5	2
(Chinese Taipei) Y-j Chan	6	6
(Russia) V Bardina	2	1
WC	(Japan) A Morita	2	1
9	(China) S Peng	6	6
3	(Italy) F Pennetta	7	6
(United States) V King	6^{7}	1
(Ukraine) J Vakulenko	2	0	r
(Russia) A Rodionova	6	3
(Austria) T Paszek	7	6
WC	(Germany) A-L Grönefeld	5	4
Q	(South Africa) N Grandin	2	1
7	(Italy) S Errani	6	6

Second round
1	(Slovakia) D Hantuchová	6	7
Q	(Ukraine) O Savchuk	1	5
(Chinese Taipei) Y-j Chan	6	7
9	(China) S Peng	1	5
3	(Italy) F Pennetta	6	7
(Russia) A Rodionova	3	5
(Austria) T Paszek	6	7
7	(Italy) S Errani	0	6^{2}

Quarterfinals
1	(Slovakia) D Hantuchová	7	4	6
(Chinese Taipei) Y-j Chan	6^{4}	6	2
3	(Italy) F Pennetta	6	0	2
(Austria) T Paszek	4	6	6

Semifinals
1	(Slovakia) D Hantuchová	2	7	4
(Austria) T Paszek	6	5	6

=== Bottom half ===
First round
5	(Italy) F Schiavone	6	6
Q	(Indonesia) S Gumulya	2	0
(Uzbekistan) A Amanmuradova	6	6
Q	(Indonesia) AF Damayanti	2	1
(Italy) T Garbin	6	7
(Hungary) M Czink	2	6^{3}
(Japan) A Nakamura	3	1
4	(Russia) N Petrova	6	6
8	(Canada) A Wozniak	6	3	2
(United States) J Craybas	3	6	6
(Poland) M Domachowska	6	6
LL	(Indonesia) L Tananta	2	3
(China) M Yuan	5	6	7
WC	(Kazakhstan) Y Shvedova	7	2	5

Second round
5	(Italy) F Schiavone	6	6
(Uzbekistan) A Amanmuradova	3	2
(Italy) T Garbin	1	1
4	(Russia) N Petrova	6	6
(United States) J Craybas	3	7	4
(Poland) M Domachowska	6	6^{5}	6
(China) M Yuan	2	5
2	(Switzerland) P Schnyder	6	7

Quarterfinals
5	(Italy) F Schiavone	4	3
4	(Russia) N Petrova	6	6
(Poland) M Domachowska	2	2
2	(Switzerland) P Schnyder	6	6

Semifinals
4	(Russia) N Petrova	5	1
2	(Switzerland) P Schnyder	7	6
