= 2006 Wismilak International – Singles =

Singles
- 2006 Wismilak International

Final
- Champion: (Russia) Svetlana Kuznetsova
- Runner-up: (France) Marion Bartoli
- Score: 7–5, 6–2

Events
Singles	Doubles
← 2005 ·	Commonwealth Bank Tennis Classic	· 2007 →

Lindsay Davenport was the defending champion, but was eliminated in the semifinals by Svetlana Kuznetsova.

Kuznetsova went on to win the title, defeating Marion Bartoli 7–5, 6–2 in the final.

== Seeds ==
The top two seeds received a bye into the second round.

1. (Russia) Svetlana Kuznetsova (champion)
2. (Switzerland) Patty Schnyder (semifinals)
3. (United States) Lindsay Davenport (semifinals)
4. (Serbia) Ana Ivanovic (first round)
5. (Slovakia) Daniela Hantuchová (first round)
6. (France) Marion Bartoli (finals)
7. (Italy) Maria Elena Camerin (withdrew due to a left leg injury)
8. (France) Séverine Brémond (quarterfinals)
9. (Japan) Aiko Nakamura (second round)

== Draw ==
=== Key ===
- Q = Qualifier
- WC = Wild card
- LL = Lucky loser
- Alt = Alternate
- SE = Special exempt
- PR = Protected ranking
- ITF = ITF entry
- JE = Junior exempt
- w/o = Walkover
- r = Retired
- d = Defaulted
- SR = Special ranking

=== Finals ===
Semifinals
1	(Russia) Svetlana Kuznetsova	7^{7}	7^{7}
3	(United States) Lindsay Davenport	6^{4}	6^{5}
6	(France) Marion Bartoli	6	6
2	(Switzerland) Patty Schnyder	4	4

Final
1	(Russia) Svetlana Kuznetsova	7	6
6	(France) Marion Bartoli	5	2

=== Top half ===
First round
(Japan) E Takao	6	6
LL	(Indonesia) V Silfany-Tony	3	1
Q	(Indonesia) S Gumulya	7	6
WC	(South Korea) S-j Kim	5	4
Q	(Australia) T Musgrave	2	2
8	(France) S Brémond	6	6
3	(United States) L Davenport	7	6
(Russia) G Voskoboeva	5	1
(South Africa) N Grandin	2	1
(Japan) A Morigami	6	6
(Japan) J Namigata	3	1
(Czech Republic) H Šromová	6	6
(Thailand) S Viratprasert	6^{2}	4
9	(Japan) A Nakamura	7^{7}	6

Second round
1	(Russia) S Kuznetsova	6	6
(Japan) E Takao	1	2
Q	(Indonesia) S Gumulya	3	6^{6}
8	(France) S Brémond	6	7^{8}
3	(United States) L Davenport	6	6
(Japan) A Morigami	2	3
(Czech Republic) H Šromová	6	7
9	(Japan) A Nakamura	3	5

Quarterfinals
1	(Russia) S Kuznetsova	6	6
8	(France) S Brémond	3	2
3	(United States) L Davenport	6	6
(Czech Republic) H Šromová	1	0

Semifinals
1	(Russia) S Kuznetsova	7^{7}	7^{7}
3	(United States) L Davenport	6^{4}	6^{5}

=== Bottom half ===
First round
6	(France) M Bartoli	6	6
Q	(Indonesia) AF Damayanti	1	0
(Australia) C Dellacqua	6	6
LL	(Indonesia) L Tananta	0	2
Q	(Slovenia) A Klepač	6^{5}	6	6
(India) S Uberoi	7^{7}	1	3
(Russia) O Poutchkova	6	4	6
4	(Serbia) A Ivanovic	3	6	2
5	(Slovakia) D Hantuchová	5	2
(Hungary) M Czink	7	6
(United States) S Rao	3	4
WC	(Indonesia) A Widjaja	6	6
(Netherlands) E Tamaëla	6	6
(Venezuela) M Vento-Kabchi	2	0

Second round
6	(France) M Bartoli	6	6
(Australia) C Dellacqua	1	3
Q	(Slovenia) A Klepač	5	3
(Russia) O Poutchkova	7	6
(Hungary) M Czink	7^{7}	6
WC	(Indonesia) A Widjaja	6^{1}	1
(Netherlands) E Tamaëla	4	1
2	(Switzerland) P Schnyder	6	6

Quarterfinals
6	(France) M Bartoli	6	6
(Russia) O Poutchkova	2	4
(Hungary) M Czink	2	2
2	(Switzerland) P Schnyder	6	6

Semifinals
6	(France) M Bartoli	6	6
2	(Switzerland) P Schnyder	4	4
