= 1997 Wismilak International =

- Date: 22–28 September
- Edition: 4th
- Category: Tier IV
- Draw: 32S / 16D
- Prize money: $107,500
- Surface: Hard / outdoor
- Location: Surabaya, Indonesia

Champions

Singles
- (Belgium) Dominique Van Roost

Doubles
- (Australia) Kerry-Anne Guse / (Japan) Rika Hiraki
← 1996 ·	Wismilak International	· 1999 →

The 1997 Wismilak International was a women's tennis tournament played on outdoor hardcourts in Surabaya in Indonesia that was part of the Tier IV category of the 1997 WTA Tour. It was the fourth edition of the tournament and was held from 22 September through 28 September 1997. First-seeded Dominique Van Roost won the singles title.

== Finals ==
=== Singles ===
(Belgium) Dominique Van Roost defeated (Czech Republic) Lenka Němečková 6–1, 6–3

- It was Van Roost's 2nd and last singles title of the year and the 3rd of her career.

=== Doubles ===
(Australia) Kerry-Anne Guse / (Japan) Rika Hiraki defeated (Canada) Maureen Drake / (Canada) Renata Kolbovic 6–1, 7–6

- It was Guse's 3rd title of the year and the 6th of her career. It was Hiraki's 4th title of the year and the 7th of her career.
