= 2005 Wismilak International – Doubles =

Doubles
- 2005 Wismilak International

Final
- Champions: (Germany) Anna-Lena Grönefeld (United States) Meghann Shaughnessy
- Runners-up: (China) Yan Zi (China) Zheng Jie
- Score: 6–3, 6–3

Events
Singles	Doubles
← 2004 ·	Commonwealth Bank Tennis Classic	· 2006 →

Anastasia Myskina and Ai Sugiyama were the defending champions, but none competed this year, with Myskina competing at the Fed Cup final during the same week.

Anna-Lena Grönefeld and Meghann Shaughnessy won the title by defeating Yan Zi and Zheng Jie 6–3, 6–3 in the final.

== Seeds ==
1. (Germany) Anna-Lena Grönefeld / (United States) Meghann Shaughnessy (champions)
2. (Italy) Flavia Pennetta / (Spain) Virginia Ruano Pascual (semifinals)
3. (China) Li Ting / (China) Sun Tiantian (quarterfinals)
4. (China) Yan Zi / (China) Zheng Jie (final)

== Draw ==
=== Key ===
- Q = Qualifier
- WC = Wild card
- LL = Lucky loser
- Alt = Alternate
- ITF = ITF entry
- PR = Protected ranking
- SR = Special ranking
- SE = Special exempt
- JE = Junior exempt
- JR = Junior Accelerator Programme entrant
- CO = College Accelerator Programme entrant
- NG = Next Gen Accelerator Program entrant
- w/o = Walkover
- r = Retired
- d = Defaulted

=== Draw ===
First round
1	(Germany) A-L Grönefeld (United States) M Shaughnessy	2	6	6
(Japan) R Fujiwara (Australia) T Musgrave	6	1	3
(Spain) N Llagostera Vives (Germany) M Müller	3	5
(Chinese Taipei) J Lee (Indonesia) W Prakusya	6	7
3	(China) T Li (China) T Sun	6	3	6
(Poland) M Domachowska (India) S Mirza	4	6	4
WC	(Italy) F Schiavone (Croatia) K Šprem	6	6
(Ukraine) A Bondarenko (Ukraine) V Bondarenko	1	4
(United Kingdom) C Curran (South Africa) N Grandin	1	6	6
Q	(Japan) R Fuda (Japan) A Nakamura	6	2	3
WC	(South Korea) Y-j Cho (China) N Li	3	2
4	(China) Z Yan (China) J Zheng	6	6
(Italy) ME Camerin (Venezuela) M Vento-Kabchi	6	7^{7}
(Russia) E Bychkova (Netherlands) K Kilsdonk	3	6^{3}
(Argentina) MJ Argeri (Brazil) L Sobral	1	5
2	(Italy) F Pennetta (Spain) V Ruano Pascual	6	7

Quarterfinals
1	(Germany) A-L Grönefeld (United States) M Shaughnessy	6	6
(Chinese Taipei) J Lee (Indonesia) W Prakusya	3	3
3	(China) T Li (China) T Sun	3	6	2
WC	(Italy) F Schiavone (Croatia) K Šprem	6	3	6
(United Kingdom) C Curran (South Africa) N Grandin	0	7^{8}	2
4	(China) Z Yan (China) J Zheng	6	6^{6}	6
(Italy) ME Camerin (Venezuela) M Vento-Kabchi	3	2
2	(Italy) F Pennetta (Spain) V Ruano Pascual	6	6

Semifinals
1	(Germany) A-L Grönefeld (United States) M Shaughnessy	6	6
WC	(Italy) F Schiavone (Croatia) K Šprem	3	2
4	(China) Z Yan (China) J Zheng	4	7^{7}	6
2	(Italy) F Pennetta (Spain) V Ruano Pascual	6	6^{5}	1

Final
1	(Germany) A-L Grönefeld (United States) M Shaughnessy	6	6
4	(China) Z Yan (China) J Zheng	3	3
