= 2005 Wismilak International =

- Date: 12–18 September
- Edition: 12th
- Category: WTA Tier III
- Draw: 30S / 16D
- Prize money: USD225,000
- Surface: Hard / outdoor
- Location: Bali, Indonesia

Champions

Singles
- (United States) Lindsay Davenport

Doubles
- (Germany) Anna-Lena Grönefeld / (United States) Meghann Shaughnessy
- Commonwealth Bank Tennis Classic

The 2005 Wismilak International was a women's tennis tournament played on outdoor hard courts. It was the 12th edition of the Commonwealth Bank Tennis Classic, and was part of the Tier III Series of the 2005 WTA Tour. It took place at the Grand Hyatt Bali in Bali, Indonesia, from 12 through 18 September 2005. Lindsay Davenport won the singles title.

== Finals ==
=== Singles ===
- (United States) Lindsay Davenport defeated (Italy) Francesca Schiavone, 6–2, 6–4.

It was the 4th title of the season for Davenport and the 49th title in her singles career.

=== Doubles ===
- (Germany) Anna-Lena Grönefeld / (United States) Meghann Shaughnessy defeated (China) Yan Zi / (China) Zheng Jie, 6–3, 6–3.

It was the 3rd title for Grönefeld and the 12th title for Shaughnessy in their respective doubles careers.

== Points and prize money ==
=== Point distribution ===
Event	W	F	SF	QF	Round of 16	Round of 32	Q	Q2	Q1
Singles	145	103	66	37	19	1	4.5	2.75	1
Doubles	145	103	66	37	1	—N/a	4.5	—N/a	—N/a

=== Prize money ===
Event	W	F	SF	QF	Round of 16	Round of 32	Q2	Q1
Singles	$35,000	$19,000	$10,300	$5,615	$3,050	$1,665	$900	$490
Doubles *	$10,500	$5,700	$3,100	$1,685	$915	—N/a	—N/a	—N/a

_{* per team}

== Singles main-draw entrants ==
=== Seeds ===
Country	Player	Rank	Seed
USA	Lindsay Davenport	1	1
SUI	Patty Schnyder	11	2
AUS	Alicia Molik	14	3
ITA	Francesca Schiavone	26	4
GER	Anna-Lena Grönefeld	31	5
ITA	Flavia Pennetta	32	6
CHN	Li Na	40	7
IND	Sania Mirza	42	8

Rankings are as of 29 August 2005

=== Other entrants ===
The following players received wildcards into the singles main draw:

- (Indonesia) Wynne Prakusya
- (Spain) Virginia Ruano Pascual

The following players received entry from the qualifying draw:

- (Germany) Martina Müller
- (China) Sun Tiantian
- (China) Yan Zi
- (Japan) Tomoko Yonemura

=== Retirements ===
- (Switzerland) Patty Schnyder (illness)

== Doubles main-draw entrants ==
=== Seeds ===
Country	Player	Country	Player	Seed
GER	Anna-Lena Grönefeld	USA	Meghann Shaughnessy	1
ITA	Flavia Pennetta	ESP	Virginia Ruano Pascual	2
CHN	Li Ting	CHN	Sun Tiantian	3
CHN	Yan Zi	CHN	Zheng Jie	4

=== Other entrants ===
The following pairs received wildcards into the doubles main draw:

- (South Korea) Cho Yoon-jeong / (China) Li Na
- (Italy) Francesca Schiavone / (Croatia) Karolina Šprem

The following pair received entry from the qualifying draw:

- (Japan) Ryōko Fuda / (Japan) Aiko Nakamura
