= Palm Beach Gardens Challenger =

Women's professional tennis tournament

ITF Women's Tour
- Event name: Palm Beach Gardens Challenger
- Location: Palm Beach Gardens, Florida, United States
- Venue: Palm Beach Gardens Tennis Center
- Category: ITF $50,000 tournaments (2003–2005); ITF $25,000 tournaments (2006–2008)
- Surface: Clay / Outdoor
- Draw: 32S/32Q/16D
- Prize money: US$50,000 (2003–2005); US$25,000 (2006–2008)

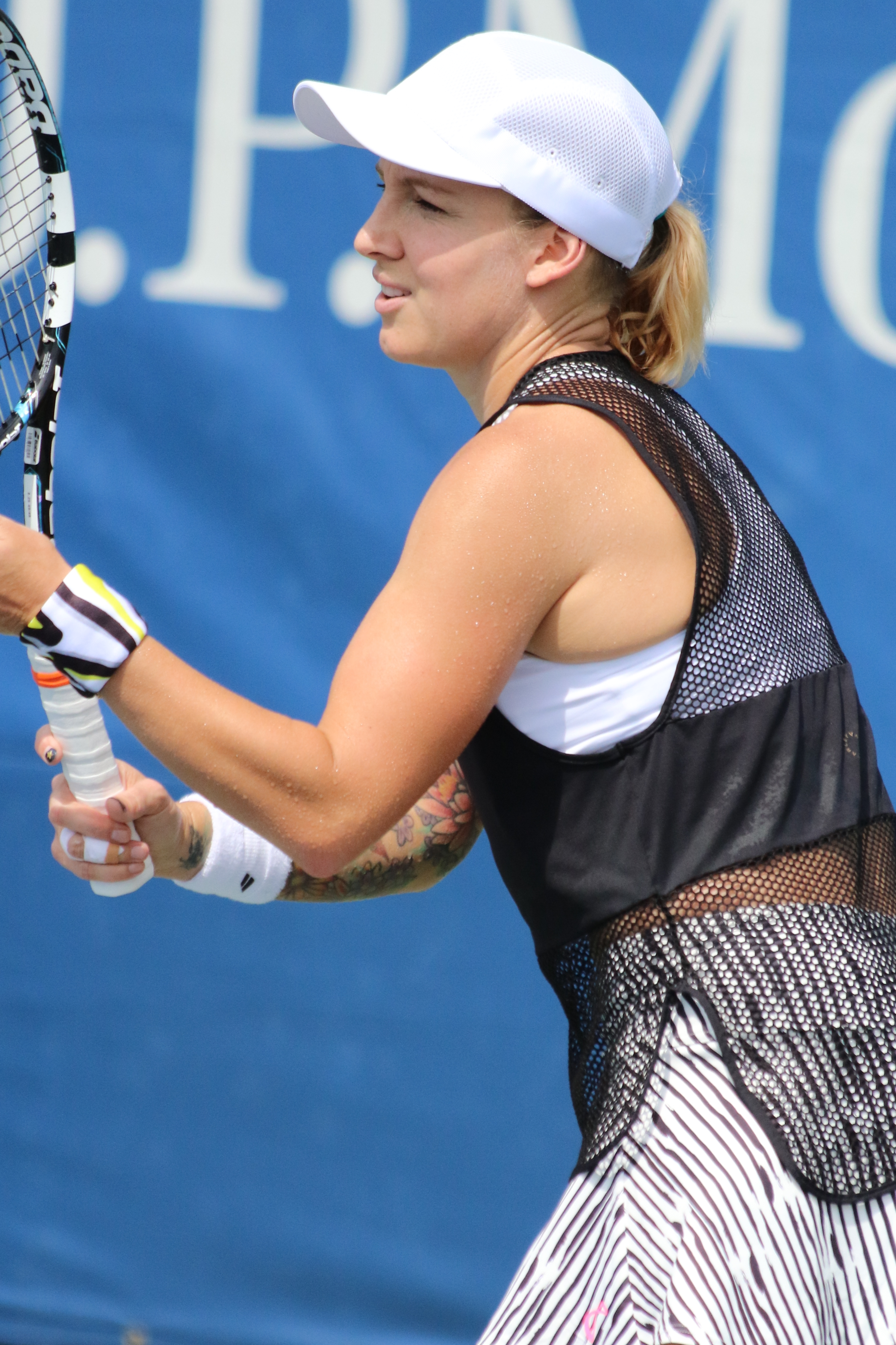
Bethanie Mattek lifted the singles trophy in 2005

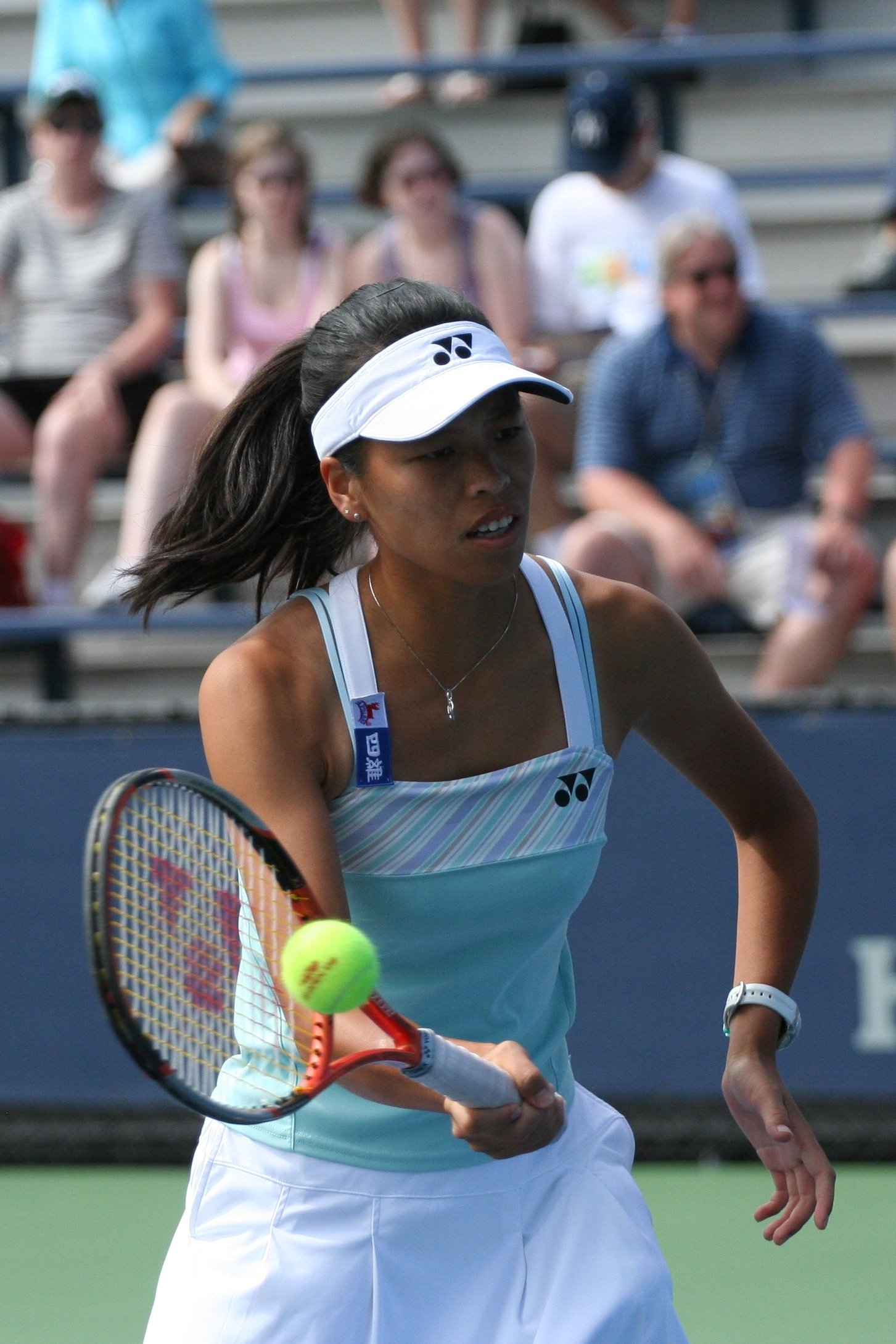
Hsieh Su-wei lifted the doubles trophy in 2005

The Palm Beach Gardens Challenger was a tournament for female professional tennis players played on outdoor clay courts. The event was classified as an ITF $50,000 Tournament from 2003 to 2005 and ITF $25,000 Tournament from 2006 to 2008. It was held annually in Palm Beach Gardens, Florida, United States, from 2003 through to 2008. It was part of the ITF Women's Circuit from 2003 to 2008; a tier below the Women's Tennis Association.

== History ==
The tournament made was downgraded in 2006 due to sponsorship reasons, and was shut down in 2008.

== Past finals ==
=== Singles ===
Year	Champion	Runner-up	Score
2008	(Argentina) Soledad Esperón	(Bulgaria) Sesil Karatantcheva	6–4, 6–1
2007	(Paraguay) Rossana de los Ríos	(Netherlands) Brenda Schultz-McCarthy	7–5, 6–4
2006	(Argentina) Jorgelina Cravero	(Paraguay) Rossana de los Ríos	6–4, 6–4
2005	(United States) Bethanie Mattek	(Hungary) Melinda Czink	4–6, 6–4, 6–4
2004	(Bulgaria) Sesil Karatantcheva	(India) Sania Mirza	3–6, 6–2, 7–5
2003	(United States) Lindsay Lee-Waters	(Spain) Marta Marrero	6–3, 6–3

=== Doubles ===
Year	Champions	Runners-up	Score
2008	(Brazil) Maria Fernanda Alves (Czech Republic) Michaela Paštiková	(Russia) Ekaterina Afinogenova (United States) Lauren Albanese	3–6, 6–3, 10–5
2007	(Australia) Monique Adamczak (United States) Aleke Tsoubanos	(Uruguay) Estefanía Craciún (Argentina) Betina Jozami	7–5, 2–6, 6–3
2006	(United States) Angela Haynes (United States) Raquel Kops-Jones	(United States) Ansley Cargill (Canada) Marie-Ève Pelletier	6–3, 6–3
2005	(Chinese Taipei) Chan Chin-wei (Chinese Taipei) Hsieh Su-wei	(Czech Republic) Olga Vymetálková (Czech Republic) Kateřina Böhmová	7–6^{(7–2)}, 7–5
2004	(Latvia) Līga Dekmeijere (Japan) Nana Miyagi	(United States) Kelly McCain (United States) Kaysie Smashey	6–3, 6–2
2003	(Hungary) Melinda Czink (Argentina) Erica Krauth	(Russia) Alina Jidkova (Russia) Tatiana Panova	6–1, 6–2
