= 2008 Commonwealth Bank Tennis Classic – Doubles =

Doubles
- 2008 Commonwealth Bank Tennis Classic

Final
- Champions: (Chinese Taipei) Su-wei Hsieh (China) Shuai Peng
- Runners-up: (Poland) Marta Domachowska (Russia) Nadia Petrova
- Score: 6–7^{(4–7)}, 7–6^{(7–3)}, [10–7]

Events
Singles	Doubles
← 2007 ·	Commonwealth Bank Tennis Classic

Shengnan Sun and Chunmei Ji were the defending champions, but chose not to participate that year.

Su-wei Hsieh and Shuai Peng won in the final 6–7^{(4–7)}, 7–6^{(7–3)}, [10–7], against Marta Domachowska and Nadia Petrova.

== Seeds ==
1. (Slovakia) Daniela Hantuchová / (Italy) Flavia Pennetta (quarterfinals)
2. (United States) Vania King / (Russia) Alla Kudryavtseva (quarterfinals)
3. (Chinese Taipei) Hsieh Su-wei / (China) Peng Shuai (champions)
4. (Uzbekistan) Akgul Amanmuradova / (Kazakhstan) Yaroslava Shvedova (quarterfinals)

== Draw ==
=== Key ===
- Q = Qualifier
- WC = Wild card
- LL = Lucky loser
- Alt = Alternate
- SE = Special exempt
- PR = Protected ranking
- ITF = ITF entry
- JE = Junior exempt
- w/o = Walkover
- r = Retired
- d = Defaulted
- SR = Special ranking

=== Draw ===
First round
1	(Slovakia) D Hantuchová (Italy) F Pennetta	6	6
(Indonesia) S Gumulya (Indonesia) L Tananta	3	4
(Chinese Taipei) Y-j Chan (Chinese Taipei) H-c Chan	5	6	[4]
(Ukraine) O Savchuk (Turkey) I Şenoğlu	7	3	[10]
3	(Chinese Taipei) S-w Hsieh (China) S Peng	6	6
(Japan) A Morita (Japan) A Nakamura	2	3
(Germany) A-L Grönefeld (Switzerland) P Schnyder	w/o
(Russia) A Rodionova (Ukraine) J Vakulenko
(United States) J Craybas (South Africa) N Grandin	2	7	[12]
(Italy) S Errani (Italy) T Garbin	6	6^{5}	[10]
WC	(Hungary) M Czink (Austria) T Paszek	4	2
4	(Uzbekistan) A Amanmuradova (Kazakhstan) Y Shvedova	6	6
(India) S Uberoi (Canada) A Wozniak	6	1	[4]
(Poland) M Domachowska (Russia) N Petrova	3	6	[10]
(Russia) M Kondratieva (France) S Lefèvre	2	4
2	(United States) V King (Russia) A Kudryavtseva	6	6

Quarterfinals
1	(Slovakia) D Hantuchová (Italy) F Pennetta	6	2	[6]
(Ukraine) O Savchuk (Turkey) I Şenoğlu	4	6	[10]
3	(Chinese Taipei) S-w Hsieh (China) S Peng	6	6
(Germany) A-L Grönefeld (Switzerland) P Schnyder	3	2
(United States) J Craybas (South Africa) N Grandin	7	3	[14]
4	(Uzbekistan) A Amanmuradova (Kazakhstan) Y Shvedova	6^{6}	6	[12]
(Poland) M Domachowska (Russia) N Petrova	7	6
2	(United States) V King (Russia) A Kudryavtseva	6^{5}	3

Semifinals
(Ukraine) O Savchuk (Turkey) I Şenoğlu	3	3
3	(Chinese Taipei) S-w Hsieh (China) S Peng	6	6
(United States) J Craybas (South Africa) N Grandin	4	7	[9]
(Poland) M Domachowska (Russia) N Petrova	6	5	[11]

Final
3	(Chinese Taipei) S-w Hsieh (China) S Peng	6^{4}	7	[10]
(Poland) M Domachowska (Russia) N Petrova	7	6^{3}	[7]
