= 2004 Palm Beach Gardens Challenger =

- Date: November 29 – December 5
- Edition: 2nd
- Surface: Clay (o)
- Location: Palm Beach Gardens, Florida, United States

Champions

Singles
- (Bulgaria) Sessil Karatantcheva

Doubles
- (Latvia) Līga Dekmeijere / (Japan) Nana Miyagi
- Palm Beach Gardens Challenger

The 2004 Palm Beach Gardens Challenger was a women's professional tennis tournament played on clay courts. It was the 2nd edition of the Palm Beach Gardens Challenger, and was an ITF $50,000 tournament from 2003 to 2005. It took place at the Palm Beach Gardens Tennis Center in Florida from November 29 to Dec 5, 2004.

== WTA entrants ==
=== Seeds ===
Country	Player	Rank^{1}	Seed
GER	Anna-Lena Grönefeld	43	1
USA	Lilia Osterloh	61	2
KAZ	Sessil Karatantcheva	72	3
USA	Kelly McCain	76	4
HUN	Melinda Czink	95	5
VEN	Milagros Sequera	110	6
IND	Shikha Uberoi	112	7
ROU	Edina Gallovits	133	8

- Rankings as of October 25, 2010.

=== Other entrants ===
The following players received wildcards into the singles main draw:

- (United States) Megan Falcon
- (United States) Carly Gullickson
- (United States) Milangela Morales

The following players received entry from the qualifying draw:

- (Russia) Ekaterina Afinogenova
- (Georgia (country)) Salome Devidze
- (Slovenia) Petra Rampre
- (United States) Neha Uberoi

The following players received entry via the Lucky loser spot:

- (Ukraine) Kateryna Bondarenko
- (Luxembourg) Mandy Minella
- (Australia) Christina Wheeler

== Champions ==
=== Singles ===
(Bulgaria) Sessil Karatantcheva def. (India) Sania Mirza, 3–6, 6–2, 7–5.

- It was Karatantcheva's 1st title of the year and the 4th of her career.

=== Doubles ===
(Latvia) Līga Dekmeijere / (Japan) Nana Miyagi def. (United States) Kelly McCain / (United States) Kaysie Smashey, 6–3, 6–2.

- It was Dekmeijere's 6th title of the year and 12th of her career
- It was Miyagi's 1st title of the year and 31st of her career
