= 2008 Commonwealth Bank Tennis Classic =

- Date: 8–14 September
- Edition: 14th
- Category: Tier III Series
- Draw: 30S / 16D
- Prize money: $225,000
- Surface: Hard / outdoor
- Location: Bali, Indonesia

Champions

Singles
- (Switzerland) Patty Schnyder

Doubles
- (Chinese Taipei) Su-wei Hsieh / (China) Shuai Peng
← 2007 ·	Commonwealth Bank Tennis Classic

The 2008 Commonwealth Bank Tennis Classic was a women's tennis tournament played on outdoor hard courts. It was the 14th edition of the Commonwealth Bank Tennis Classic, and was part of the Tier III Series of the 2008 WTA Tour. It took place at the Grand Hyatt Bali in Bali, Indonesia, from 8 September through 14 September 2008. Second-seeded Patty Schnyder won the singles title.

== Finals ==
=== Singles ===
(Switzerland) Patty Schnyder defeated (Austria) Tamira Paszek, 6–3, 6–0

- It was Schnyder's 1st singles title of the year, and the 11th and last of her career.

=== Doubles ===
(Chinese Taipei) Hsieh Su-wei / (China) Peng Shuai defeated (Poland) Marta Domachowska / (Russia) Nadia Petrova, 6–7^{(4–7)}, 7–6^{(7–3)}, [10–7]
