= 2007 Commonwealth Bank Tennis Classic =

- Date: 10–16 September
- Edition: 13th
- Category: Tier III Series
- Draw: 30S / 16D
- Prize money: $225,000
- Surface: Hard / outdoor
- Location: Bali, Indonesia

Champions

Singles
- (United States) Lindsay Davenport

Doubles
- (China) Ji Chunmei / (China) Sun Shengnan
| ← 2006 · | Commonwealth Bank Tennis Classic | · 2008 → |

The 2007 Commonwealth Bank Tennis Classic was a women's tennis tournament played on outdoor hard courts. It was the 13th edition of the Commonwealth Bank Tennis Classic, and was part of the Tier III Series of the 2007 WTA Tour. It took place at the Grand Hyatt Bali in Bali, Indonesia, from 10 September through 16 September 2007. Unseeded Lindsay Davenport won the singles title and earned $32,240 first-prize money.

== Return of Lindsay Davenport ==
Lindsay Davenport, the former world number one, returned after the birth of her son. Davenport competed in her first singles tournament this year, and had not played a professional match in 51 weeks. However, Davenport immediately found form and defeated Eleni Daniilidou in straight sets. After this, Davenport raced through her match with Julie Ditty and then stunned rising world number 3 star Jelena Janković, 6–2, 2–6, 6–4. Davenport defeated Sara Errani in straight sets in the semifinals before taking the title by defeating her doubles partner Daniela Hantuchová in the final.

== Finals ==
=== Singles ===
(United States) Lindsay Davenport defeated (Slovakia) Daniela Hantuchová 6–4, 3–6, 6–2

=== Doubles ===
(China) Sun Shengnan / (China) Ji Chunmei defeated (United States) Jill Craybas / (South Africa) Natalie Grandin 6–3, 6–2
