= 1994 Surabaya Women's Open =

- Date: 7–13 November
- Edition: 1st
- Category: Tier IV
- Draw: 32S / 16D
- Prize money: $100,000
- Surface: Hard / outdoor
- Location: Surabaya, Indonesia
- Venue: Embong Sawo Sports Club

Champions

Singles
- (Bulgaria) Elena Wagner

Doubles
- (Indonesia) Yayuk Basuki / (Indonesia) Romana Tedjakusuma
- Wismilak International

The 1994 Surabaya Women's Open, also known as the Digital Open, was a women's tennis tournament played on outdoor hard courts at the Embong Sawo Sports Club in Surabaya, Indonesia that was part of Tier IV of the 1994 WTA Tour. It was the inaugural edition of the tournament and was held from 7 November until 13 November 1994. Unseeded Elena Wagner won the singles title and earned $18,000 first-prize money.

== Finals ==
=== Singles ===
(Bulgaria) Elena Wagner defeated (Japan) Ai Sugiyama 2–6, 6–0, retired

- It was Wagner's only singles title of her career.

=== Doubles ===
(Indonesia) Yayuk Basuki / (Indonesia) Romana Tedjakusuma defeated (Japan) Kyōko Nagatsuka / (Japan) Ai Sugiyama walkover

- It was Basuki's 1st doubles title of the year and the 3rd of her career. It was Tedjakusuma's only doubles title of her career.
