= 2007 Commonwealth Bank Tennis Classic – Doubles =

Doubles
- 2007 Commonwealth Bank Tennis Classic

Final
- Champions: (China) Ji Chunmei (China) Sun Shengnan
- Runners-up: (United States) Jill Craybas (South Africa) Natalie Grandin
- Score: 6–3, 6–2

Events
Singles	Doubles
← 2006 ·	Commonwealth Bank Tennis Classic	· 2008 →

The doubles Tournament at the 2007 Commonwealth Bank Tennis Classic took place between 10 and 16 December on outdoor hard courts in Bali, Indonesia. Ji Chunmei and Sun Shengnan won the title, defeating Jill Craybas and Natalie Grandin in the final.

== Seeds ==
1. (Greece) Eleni Daniilidou / (Germany) Jasmin Wöhr (first round)
2. (Belarus) Tatiana Poutchek / (Russia) Anastasia Rodionova (first round)
3. (China) Ji Chunmei / (China) Sun Shengnan (champions)
4. (Germany) Martina Müller / (Czech Republic) Gabriela Navrátilová (semifinals)

== Draw ==
=== Key ===
- Q = Qualifier
- WC = Wild card
- LL = Lucky loser
- Alt = Alternate
- SE = Special exempt
- PR = Protected ranking
- ITF = ITF entry
- JE = Junior exempt
- w/o = Walkover
- r = Retired
- d = Defaulted
- SR = Special ranking

First round
1	(Greece) E Daniilidou (Germany) J Wöhr	2	3
(Italy) S Errani (Spain) A Medina Garrigues	6	6
(United States) J Craybas (South Africa) N Grandin	2	6	[10]
(Hungary) M Czink (Czech Republic) H Šromová	6	3	[3]
4	(Germany) M Müller (Czech Republic) G Navrátilová	7	6
(Chinese Taipei) S-w Hsieh (Japan) A Nakamura	6^{4}	4
(Slovakia) J Gajdošová (Romania) E Gallovits	5	6	[10]
(Australia) C Dellacqua (Thailand) T Tanasugarn	7	2	[12]
(Uzbekistan) A Amanmuradova (India) S Rao	0	6	[10]
(Slovenia) A Klepač (Denmark) C Wozniacki	6	3	[8]
WC	(Indonesia) W Prakusya (Indonesia) A Widjaja	2	6	[7]
3	(China) C Ji (China) S Sun	6	2	[10]
WC	(United States) L Davenport (Slovakia) D Hantuchová	6	6
WC	(France) S Lefèvre (Turkey) İ Şenoğlu	3	1
(United States) J Ditty (Russia) A Jidkova	7	6^{5}	[10]
2	(Belarus) T Poutchek (Russia) A Rodionova	6^{7}	7	[8]

Quarterfinals
1	(Italy) S Errani (Spain) A Medina Garrigues
(United States) J Craybas (South Africa) N Grandin	w/o
4	(Germany) M Müller (Czech Republic) G Navrátilová	6	0	[10]
(Australia) C Dellacqua (Thailand) T Tanasugarn	3	6	[8]
(Uzbekistan) A Amanmuradova (India) S Rao	3	6	[5]
3	(China) C Ji (China) S Sun	6	1	[10]
(United States) L Davenport (Slovakia) D Hantuchová	6	6
2	(United States) J Ditty (Russia) A Jidkova	4	4

Semifinals
(United States) J Craybas (South Africa) N Grandin	6	6
4	(Germany) M Müller (Czech Republic) G Navrátilová	3	4
3	(China) C Ji (China) S Sun	w/o
(United States) L Davenport (Slovakia) D Hantuchová

Final
(United States) J Craybas (South Africa) N Grandin	3	2
3	(China) C Ji (China) S Sun	6	6
