= Anique Snijders =

Dutch tennis player

- Country (sports): Netherlands
- Born: 15 September 1973 (age 51)
- Prize money: $30,708

Singles
- Career titles: 1 ITF
- Highest ranking: No. 261 20 June 1994)

Doubles
- Career titles: 1 ITF
- Highest ranking: No. 161 (22 April 1996)

Anique Snijders (born 15 September 1973) is a Dutch former professional tennis player.

Snijders competed on the professional tour in the 1990s, reaching a best singles ranking of 261 in the world. She qualified for three WTA Tour main draws, at the 1994 Eastbourne International, 1995 Surabaya Open and the 1996 Bol Ladies Open.

== ITF finals ==
$25,000 tournaments
$10,000 tournaments

=== Singles: 1 (1–0) ===
Result	No.	Date	Tournament	Surface	Opponent	Score
Win	1.	21 June 1993	ITF Covilhã, Portugal	Clay	(Paraguay) Magalí Benítez	7–6^{(4)}, 1–6, 6–3

=== Doubles: 8 (1–7) ===
Result	No.	Date	Tournament	Surface	Partner	Opponents	Score
Loss	1.	8 June 1992	Oliveira, Portugal	Hard	(Netherlands) Annemarie Mikkers	(Australia) Shareen Bottrell (Australia) Maria Purcell	6–4, 3–6, 2–6
Loss	2.	25 January 1993	Austin, United States	Hard	(Netherlands) Annemarie Mikkers	(United States) Elly Hakami (United States) Anne Mall	7–6^{(4)}, 2–6, 1–6
Win	1.	28 February 1994	Buchen, Germany	Carpet	(Netherlands) Caroline Stassen	(Poland) Isabela Listowska (Germany) Petra Winzenhöller	6–4, 6–4
Loss	3.	6 March 1995	Buchen, Germany	Carpet	(Netherlands) Marielle Bruens	(Czech Republic) Olga Hostáková (Germany) Sabine Gerke	1–6, 2–6
Loss	4.	31 July 1995	Mississauga, Canada	Hard	(Germany) Kirstin Freye	(Canada) Rene Simpson (Canada) Caroline Delisle	3–6, 2–6
Loss	5.	20 October 1996	Samara, Russia	Carpet	(Germany) Maja Živec-Škulj	(Russia) Natalia Egorova (Russia) Olga Ivanova	6–4, 2–6, 3–6
Loss	6.	28 October 1996	Poitiers, France	Hard	(France) Noëlle van Lottum	(Belarus) Olga Barabanschikova (India) Nirupama Sanjeev	2–6, 3–6
Loss	7.	10 November 1996	Ramat Hasharon, Israel	Hard	(France) Noëlle van Lottum	(Germany) Kirstin Freye (Netherlands) Seda Noorlander	2–6, 5–7
