= 2005 Wismilak International – Singles =

Singles
- 2005 Wismilak International

Final
- Champion: (United States) Lindsay Davenport
- Runner-up: (Italy) Francesca Schiavone
- Score: 6–2, 6–4

Events
Singles	Doubles
- Commonwealth Bank Tennis Classic

Svetlana Kuznetsova was the defending champion, but had to withdraw due to a back injury.

Lindsay Davenport won the title, defeating Francesca Schiavone 6–2, 6–4 in the final.

== Seeds ==
The top two seeds received a bye into the second round.

1. (United States) Lindsay Davenport (champion)
2. (Switzerland) Patty Schnyder (semifinals, retired due to heat exhaustion)
3. (Australia) Alicia Molik (second round)
4. (Italy) Francesca Schiavone (final)
5. (Germany) Anna-Lena Grönefeld (second round)
6. (Italy) Flavia Pennetta (quarterfinals)
7. (China) Li Na (semifinals)
8. (India) Sania Mirza (first round)

== Draw ==
Key

- Q = Qualifier
- WC = Wild card
- LL = Lucky loser
- Alt = Alternate
- ITF = ITF entry
- PR = Protected ranking
- SR = Special ranking
- SE = Special exempt
- JE = Junior exempt
- JR = Junior Accelerator Programme entrant
- CO = College Accelerator Programme entrant
- NG = Next Gen Accelerator Program entrant
- w/o = Walkover
- r = Retired
- d = Defaulted

=== Finals ===
Semifinals
1	(United States) Lindsay Davenport	6	6
7	(China) Li Na	2	2
4	(Italy) Francesca Schiavone	1	6	0
2	(Switzerland) Patty Schnyder	6	4	0^{r}

Final
1	(United States) Lindsay Davenport	6	6
4	(Italy) Francesca Schiavone	2	4

=== Top half ===
First round
(Japan) R Fujiwara	6	2	7^{7}
(South Africa) N Grandin	4	6	6^{5}
(Italy) ME Camerin	6	3	6
(Poland) M Domachowska	2	6	4
(Russia) E Bychkova	6	6
8	(India) S Mirza	3	2
3	(Australia) A Molik	7^{8}	6
(Argentina) M Díaz Oliva	6^{6}	3
(Ukraine) A Bondarenko	6	6
(South Korea) Y-j Cho	4	4
Q	(China) Z Yan	6	7
WC	(Indonesia) W Prakusya	2	5
(Spain) N Llagostera Vives	3	1
7	(China) N Li	6	6

Second round
1	(United States) L Davenport	6	6
(Japan) R Fujiwara	3	2
(Italy) ME Camerin	6	6
(Russia) E Bychkova	4	3
3	(Australia) A Molik	4	2
(Ukraine) A Bondarenko	6	6
Q	(China) Z Yan	3	4
7	(China) N Li	6	6

Quarterfinals
1	(United States) L Davenport	6	6
(Italy) ME Camerin	3	1
(Ukraine) A Bondarenko	4	6	2
7	(China) N Li	6	3	6

Semifinals
1	(United States) L Davenport	6	6
7	(China) N Li	2	2

=== Bottom half ===
First round
6	(Italy) F Pennetta	6	6
Q	(Germany) M Müller	3	1
(Venezuela) M Vento-Kabchi	3	4
(China) J Zheng	6	6
(Spain) L Pous Tió	6	4	6
(United States) M Shaughnessy	4	6	1
(United States) J Jackson	4	6	4
4	(Italy) F Schiavone	6	3	6
5	(Germany) A-L Grönefeld	7	5	6
(Croatia) K Šprem	5	7	3
(Japan) A Nakamura	7^{9}	7
Q	(Japan) T Yonemura	6^{7}	5
WC	(Spain) V Ruano Pascual	6	6
Q	(China) T Sun	2	2

Second round
6	(Italy) F Pennetta	4	6	6
(China) J Zheng	6	3	3
(Spain) L Pous Tió	3	2
4	(Italy) F Schiavone	6	6
5	(Germany) A-L Grönefeld	3	6	1
(Japan) A Nakamura	6	1	6
WC	(Spain) V Ruano Pascual	2	3
2	(Switzerland) P Schnyder	6	6

Quarterfinals
6	(Italy) F Pennetta	7	3	5
4	(Italy) F Schiavone	5	6	7
(Japan) A Nakamura	4	1
2	(Switzerland) P Schnyder	6	6

Semifinals
4	(Italy) F Schiavone	1	6	0
2	(Switzerland) P Schnyder	6	4	0^{r}
