= Stephanie Reece =

American tennis player

- Full name: Stephanie Reece
- Country (sports): United States
- Born: April 24, 1970 (age 56)
- Prize money: $80,769

Singles
- Highest ranking: No. 219 (October 10, 1994)

Doubles
- Highest ranking: No. 79 (August 26, 1996)

Grand Slam doubles results
- Australian Open: 2R (1996)
- French Open: 1R (1994, 1996)
- Wimbledon: 2R (1996)
- US Open: 1R (1993, 1996)

Stephanie Reece (born April 24, 1970) is a former professional tennis player from the United States.

== Biography ==
Reece grew up in Indianapolis, where she attended North Central High School and featured in three IHSAA state championship winning teams. She played collegiate tennis at Indiana University for four years, earning five All-American selections.

As a professional player, Reece was most successful in the doubles format, with a top ranking of 79 in the world. She was doubles runner-up partnering Nana Miyagi at the Surabaya Open WTA Tour tournament in 1995 and appeared in the women's doubles main draw of all four grand slam tournaments in 1996, which was her final season on tour.

She is still involved in tennis as a coach at Zionsville High School in Indiana.

In September 2018, her ex-husband Michael Hunn shot dead their two children in a murder-suicide.

== WTA Tour finals ==
=== Doubles (0-1) ===
Result	Date	Tournament	Tier	Surface	Partner	Opponents	Score
Loss	October, 1995	Surabaya, Indonesia	Tier IV	Hard	(Japan) Nana Miyagi	(Netherlands) Petra Kamstra (Slovenia) Tina Križan	6–2, 4–6, 1–6
