= Kerry-Anne Guse =

Australian tennis player (born 1972)

- Country (sports): Australia
- Residence: Brisbane
- Born: 4 December 1972 (age 53) Brisbane
- Height: 1.59 m (5 ft 2 1/2 in)
- Plays: Right-handed
- Prize money: US$ 621,389

Singles
- Career record: 19–47
- Career titles: 0
- Highest ranking: No. 60 (3 November 1997)

Grand Slam singles results
- Australian Open: 1R (1989, 1993–96, 1998, 2000)
- French Open: 1R (1998)
- Wimbledon: 2R (1996, 1997)
- US Open: 1R (1997, 1998)

Doubles
- Career record: 110–120
- Career titles: 6 WTA
- Highest ranking: No. 26 (6 April 1998)

Kerry-Anne Guse (4 December 1972) is an Australian tennis player. Born in Brisbane, Queensland, she turned professional at the age of 15. She was coached by her father, Mauri Guse.

Playing for Australia in Fed Cup, she has a win-loss record of 3–2.

== WTA Tour finals ==
=== Doubles: 13 (6–7) ===
Legend
Grand Slam	0
WTA Championships	0
Tier I	0
Tier II	0
Tier III	0
Tier IV & V	5

Titles by surface
Hard	3
Clay	2
Grass	0
Carpet	1

Result	No.	Date	Tournament	Surface	Partner	Opponents	Score
Win	1.	Jul 1991	San Marino	Clay	(Japan) Akemi Nishiya	(Italy) Laura Garrone (Argentina) Mercedes Paz	6–0, 6–3
Loss	2.	Feb 1994	Beijing, China	Hard (i)	(United Kingdom) Valda Lake	(China) Chen Li (China) Li Fang	0–6, 2–6
Loss	3.	May 1994	Jakarta, Indonesia	Hard	(Czech Republic) Andrea Strnadová	(United States) Nicole Arendt (Australia) Kristine Kunce	2–6, 2–6
Loss	4.	Jun 1994	Birmingham, England	Grass	(Australia) Catherine Barclay	(United States) Zina Garrison (Soviet Union) Larisa Savchenko	4–6, 4–6
Loss	5.	May 1995	Bournemouth, England	Clay	(Canada) Patricia Hy	(South Africa) Mariaan de Swardt (Romania) Ruxandra Dragomir	3–6, 5–7
Win	6.	Sep 1995	Nagoya, Japan	Carpet (i)	(Australia) Kristine Radford	(Japan) Rika Hiraki (South Korea) Park Sung-hee	6–4, 6–4
Loss	7.	Jan 1996	Hobart, Australia	Grass	(South Korea) Park Sung-hee	(Indonesia) Yayuk Basuki (Japan) Kyōko Nagatsuka	6–7, 3–6
Win	8.	Oct 1996	Surabaya, Indonesia	Hard	(France) Alexandra Fusai	(Slovenia) Tina Križan (France) Noëlle van Lottum	6–4, 6–4
Loss	9.	Apr 1997	Tokyo, Japan	Hard	(United States) Corina Morariu	(France) Alexia Dechaume-Balleret (Japan) Rika Hiraki	4–6, 2–6
Win	10.	Apr 1997	Jakarta, Indonesia	Hard	(Australia) Kristine Kunce	(Czech Republic) Lenka Němečková (Japan) Yuka Yoshida	6–4, 5–7, 7–5
Win	11.	May 1997	Cardiff, Wales	Clay	(United States) Debbie Graham	(United Kingdom) Julie Pullin (United Kingdom) Lorna Woodroffe	6–3, 6–4
Win	12.	Sep 1997	Surabaya, Indonesia	Hard	(Japan) Rika Hiraki	(Canada) Maureen Drake (Canada) Renata Kolbovic	6–1, 7–6
Loss	13.	Apr 1999	Tokyo, Japan	Hard	(Australia) Catherine Barclay	(United States) Corina Morariu (United States) Kimberly Po	3–6, 2–6

== ITF finals ==
=== Singles (7–6) ===
Legend
$75,000 tournaments
$50,000 tournaments
$25,000 tournaments
$10,000 tournaments

Result	No.	Date	Location	Surface	Opponent	Score
Loss	1.	5 December 1994	Nuriootpa, Australia	Hard	(Croatia) Maja Murić	5–7, 1–6
Loss	2.	12 December 1994	Mildura, Australia	Grass	(France) Sandrine Testud	1–6, 3–6
Win	1.	23 March 1997	Noda, Japan	Hard	(South Korea) Choi Young-ja	0–6, 6–4, 6–2
Win	2.	4 May 1997	Gifu, Japan	Grass	(South Korea) Jeon Mi-ra	7–5, 7–5
Loss	3.	11 May 1996	Seoul, South Korea	Clay	(Japan) Misumi Miyauchi	6–1, 3–6, 1–6
Loss	4.	14 September 1997	Seoul, South Korea	Hard	(South Korea) Park Sung-hee	3–6, 4–6
Win	3.	21 September 1997	Taipei, Chinese Taipei	Hard	(Australia) Catherine Barclay	6–4, 7–6
Win	4.	28 February 1999	Bendigo, Australia	Hard	(Australia) Lisa McShea	6–1, 4–6, 6–4
Win	5.	7 March 1999	Warrnambool, Australia	Grass	(Australia) Lisa McShea	6–2, 7–6^{(8–6)}
Win	6.	14 March 1999	Wodonga, Australia	Grass	(Australia) Trudi Musgrave	6–4, 6–1
Loss	5.	21 March 1999	Wodonga, Australia	Grass	(Australia) Trudi Musgrave	3–6, 1–6
Win	7.	30 August 1999	Kuroshio, Japan	Hard	(Japan) Akiko Morigami	6–4, 6–3
Loss	6.	5 December 1999	Port Pirie, Australia	Hard	(United States) Holly Parkinson	3–6, 4–6

=== Doubles (34–11) ===
Result	No	Date	Tournament	Surface	Partner	Opponents	Score
Win	1.	12 February 1990	Adelaide, Australia	Hard	(Australia) Catherine Barclay	(Australia) Maija Avotins (Australia) Joanne Limmer	6–0, 6–0
Loss	1.	14 May 1990	Ramat Hasharon, Israel	Hard	(United Kingdom) Julie Salmon	(South Africa) Michelle Anderson (South Africa) Robyn Field	3–6, 2–6
Win	2.	2 July 1990	Stuttgart-Vaihingen, West Germany	Clay	(Australia) Danielle Jones	(Czechoslovakia) Ivana Jankovská (Czechoslovakia) Eva Melicharová	6–4, 6–7, 6–3
Win	3.	7 October 1990	Tokyo, Japan	Hard	(Australia) Kristine Kunce	(Japan) Rika Hiraki (Japan) Yasuyo Kajita	4–6, 6–1, 7–5
Win	4.	14 October 1990	Matsuyama, Japan	Clay	(Australia) Kristine Kunce	(Australia) Angie Cunningham (Australia) Catherine Barclay	6–7, 6–3, ret.
Win	5.	21 October 1990	Kyoto, Japan	Hard	(Australia) Kristine Kunce	(Japan) Rika Hiraki (Japan) Yasuyo Kajita	6–3, 6–4
Loss	2.	28 October 1990	Nagasaki, Japan	Hard	(Australia) Kristine Kunce	(Indonesia) Yayuk Basuki (Indonesia) Suzanna Wibowo	2–6, 6–7^{(8–10)}
Loss	3.	4 November 1990	Saga, Japan	Grass	(Australia) Kristine Kunce	(Indonesia) Yayuk Basuki (Indonesia) Suzanna Wibowo	3–6, 2–6
Loss	4.	12 November 1990	Mount Gambier, Australia	Hard	(Australia) Justine Hodder	(Australia) Jo-Anne Faull (France) Noëlle van Lottum	5–7, 4–6
Win	6.	4 February 1991	Jakarta, Indonesia	Clay	(Australia) Justine Hodder	(Japan) Ei Iida (Japan) Misumi Miyauchi	7–6^{(2)}, 7–5
Loss	5.	4 November 1991	Port Pirie, Australia	Hard	(Australia) Justine Hodder	(Australia) Jo-Anne Faull (Australia) Michelle Jaggard-Lai	2–6, 5–7
Win	7.	27 April 1992	Jakarta, Indonesia	Clay	(Australia) Kristine Kunce	(Australia) Tracey Morton-Rodgers (New Zealand) Julie Richardson	7–6, 6–2
Win	8.	23 November 1992	Nuriootpa, Australia	Hard	(Australia) Angie Cunningham	(Poland) Magdalena Feistel (Australia) Kirrily Sharpe	4–6, 7–6, 6–2
Loss	6.	20 December 1992	Brisbane, Australia	Grass	(Australia) Kristine Kunce	(Australia) Angie Cunningham (Australia) Justine Hodder	4–6, 6–3, 2–6
Win	9.	14 November 1993	Bendigo, Australia	Hard	(Australia) Catherine Barclay	(Australia) Jo-Anne Faull (Australia) Kirrily Sharpe	6–2, 3–6, 7–6
Win	10.	5 December 1993	Mildura, Australia	Hard	(Australia) Catherine Barclay	(Australia) Jo-Anne Faull (Australia) Kirrily Sharpe	6–3, 6–2
Win	11.	30 October 1994	Tarakan, Indonesia	Hard	(Australia) Catherine Barclay	(Japan) Yone Kamio (Japan) Naoko Kijimuta	6–2, 6–3
Loss	7.	11 December 1994	Nuriootpa, Australia	Hard	(Australia) Catherine Barclay	(Australia) Kristin Godridge (Australia) Kirrily Sharpe	2–6, 7–6, 4–6
Win	12.	5 May 1996	Seoul, South Korea	Hard	(Australia) Catherine Barclay	(Thailand) Benjamas Sangaram (South Korea) Choi Young-ja	6–1, 6–2
Win	13.	6 May 1996	Seoul, South Korea	Clay	(Australia) Catherine Barclay	(Japan) Yuko Hosoki (Japan) Yuka Tanaka	4–6, 6–0, 6–3
Win	14.	11 August 1996	Tarakan, Indonesia	Hard	(Australia) Annabel Ellwood	(South Korea) Jeon Mi-ra (Thailand) Benjamas Sangaram	6–3, 6–2
Win	15.	15 December 1996	Hope Island, Australia	Hard	(Australia) Catherine Barclay	(Australia) Lisa McShea (Australia) Joanne Limmer	6–4, 6–4
Loss	8.	17 February 1997	Redbridge, United Kingdom	Hard (i)	(United Kingdom) Clare Wood	(United Kingdom) Julie Pullin (United Kingdom) Lorna Woodroffe	6–2, 4–6, 4–6
Win	16.	8 June 1997	Surbiton, United Kingdom	Grass	(Australia) Catherine Barclay	(United States) Debbie Graham (Australia) Kristine Kunce	3–6, 6–4, 7–6
Loss	9.	4 August 1997	Jakarta, Indonesia	Clay	(Australia) Kristine Kunce	(South Korea) Choi Young-ja (South Korea) Kim Eun-ha	3–6, 4–6
Win	17.	14 September 1997	Seoul, South Korea	Hard	(Australia) Catherine Barclay	(South Korea) Park Sung-hee (Chinese Taipei) Wang Shi-ting	4–6, 6–4, 6–1
Loss	10.	15 September 1997	Taipei, Taiwan	Hard	(Australia) Catherine Barclay	(South Korea) Choi Young-ja (South Korea) Kim Eun-ha	6–1, 4–6, 3–6
Win	18.	30 November 1997	Nuriootpa, Australia	Hard	(Australia) Catherine Barclay	(South Africa) Nannie de Villiers (Australia) Lisa McShea	6–3, 7–5
Win	19.	15 February 1998	Midland, United States	Hard (i)	(Australia) Catherine Barclay	(Belarus) Olga Barabanschikova (United States) Erika deLone	6–2, 6–4
Win	20.	22 February 1998	Rochester, United States	Hard (i)	(Australia) Catherine Barclay	(South Africa) Nannie de Villiers (United States) Ginger Helgeson-Nielsen	6–4, 6–4
Win	21.	3 May 1998	Gifu, Japan	Grass	(Australia) Catherine Barclay	(South Korea) Cho Yoon-jeong (South Korea) Park Sung-hee	7–6^{(7–3)}, 6–4
Win	22.	25 October 1998	Gold Coast, Australia	Hard	(Australia) Catherine Barclay	(Australia) Lisa McShea (Australia) Trudi Musgrave	6–4, 6–2
Win	23.	15 November 1998	Bendigo, Australia	Hard	(Australia) Catherine Barclay	(United States) Dawn Buth (Canada) Vanessa Webb	6–7, 6–3, 6–1
Win	24.	28 February 1999	Bendigo, Australia	Hard	(Australia) Lisa McShea	(Australia) Trudi Musgrave (Australia) Cindy Watson	6–4, 6–1
Win	25.	1 March 1998	Warrnambool, Australia	Grass	(Australia) Trudi Musgrave	(South Africa) Mareze Joubert (United Kingdom) Kate Warne Holland	6–4, 6–4
Win	26.	7 March 1999	Wodonga, Australia	Grass	(Australia) Trudi Musgrave	(South Africa) Natalie Grandin (South Africa) Alicia Pillay	6–3, 6–2
Win	27.	15 March 1998	Albury, Australia	Grass	(Australia) Trudi Musgrave	(South Africa) Mareze Joubert (United Kingdom) Kate Warne Holland	7–6, 6–3
Win	28.	22 March 1998	Corowa, Australia	Grass	(Australia) Trudi Musgrave	(South Africa) Mareze Joubert (United Kingdom) Kate Warne Holland	6–2, 1–6, 6–3
Win	29.	30 August 1999	Kuroshio, Japan	Hard	(Japan) Maiko Inoue	(South Africa) Mareze Joubert (United Kingdom) Kate Warne Holland	6–4, 7–6
Win	30.	10 October 1999	Dalby, Australia	Hard	(Australia) Lisa McShea	(Australia) Kylie Hunt (Indonesia) Wynne Prakusya	6–3, 5–7, 6–4
Win	31.	17 October 1999	Queensland, Australia	Hard	(Australia) Lisa McShea	(Australia) Alicia Molik (Australia) Bryanne Stewart	6–1, 3–6, 7–5
Win	32.	24 October 1999	Gold Coast, Australia	Hard	(Australia) Lisa McShea	(Japan) Rika Hiraki (Australia) Trudi Musgrave	6–2, 6–3
Win	33.	5 December 1999	Port Pirie, Australia	Hard	(Australia) Lisa McShea	(Czech Republic) Eva Martincová (Czech Republic) Alena Vašková	6–4, 6–1
Loss	11.	20 October 2000	Brisbane, Australia	Hard	(Australia) Rachel McQuillan	(Australia) Annabel Ellwood (South Africa) Nannie de Villiers	5–3, 2–4, 3–5, 1–4
Win	34.	29 October 2000	Dalby, Australia	Hard	(Australia) Rachel McQuillan	(Australia) Melanie Clayton (United States) Nadia Johnston	3–0 ret.
