= Nana Smith =

American tennis player

- Native name: 宮城ナナ
- Country (sports): Japan; United States
- Residence: San Diego, California, U.S.
- Born: 10 April 1971 (age 55) Seattle, Washington, U.S.
- Height: 1.63 m (5 ft 4 in)
- Turned pro: 1 March 1988
- Retired: 21 March 2006
- Plays: Right (two-handed both sides)
- Prize money: $1,234,067

Singles
- Career record: 273–265
- Career titles: 4 ITF
- Highest ranking: No. 51 (27 February 1995)

Grand Slam singles results
- Australian Open: 2R (1990, 1991, 1996, 1998)
- French Open: 2R (1990)
- Wimbledon: 2R (1994, 1998)
- US Open: 2R (1997)

Doubles
- Career record: 452–288
- Career titles: 10 WTA, 31 ITF
- Highest ranking: No. 12 (26 May 1997)

Grand Slam doubles results
- Australian Open: QF (1997, 1998, 2000)
- French Open: 3R (1997)
- Wimbledon: 3R (1994, 1997, 1998)
- US Open: SF (1993)

Team competitions
- Fed Cup: 10–6

Nana Smith (born Nana Miyagi (Japanese: 宮城ナナ); 10 April 1971) is an American-born tennis player who played for Japan.

== Career ==
Miyagi, a former top-15 player in doubles, played at all Grand Slam tournaments in both singles and doubles – the Australian Open, French Open, Wimbledon and the US Open. She scored her first top-10 win in singles in 1994, over then-world No. 8, Lindsay Davenport, and also scored wins over many top-20 ranked players, including Martina Hingis. Her highest ranking in singles is 51, which she reached in February 1995. She won four singles titles on the ITF Circuit.

She had a more successful doubles career, reaching a career-high ranking of 12 in 1997, winning 10 WTA titles and an additional 31 ITF Circuit titles. Also, she reached the semifinals of the 1993 US Open with Yayuk Basuki, and scored a notable win over Serena and Venus Williams at the 1998 Australian Open, with Naoko Kijimuta.

Nana also won two medals at the 1998 Asian Games in Bangkok, gold in mixed-doubles with Satoshi Iwabuchi and bronze in women's doubles with Rika Hiraki.

== WTA career finals ==
Legend
Tier I
Tier II
Tier III
Tier IV & V

=== Singles: 1 (runner-up) ===
Result	No.	Date	Tournament	Surface	Opponent	Score
Loss	1.	Oct 1996	Surabaya Classic, Indonesia	Hard	(Chinese Taipei) Wang Shi-ting	4–6, 0–6

=== Doubles: 22 (10 titles, 12 runner-ups) ===
Result	W/L	Date	Tournament	Surface	Partner	Opponents	Score
Loss	1.	Apr 1989	Taipei Championship, Taiwan	Hard	(Sweden) Cecilia Dahlman	(Sweden) Maria Lindström (United States) Heather Ludloff	6–4, 5–7, 3–6
Win	2.	Aug 1990	Schenectady Open, United States	Hard	(United States) Alysia May	(Italy) Linda Ferrando (West Germany) Wiltrud Probst	6–4, 5–7, 6–3
Win	3.	Apr 1991	Pattaya Open, Thailand	Hard	(Indonesia) Suzanna Anggarkusuma	(Japan) Rika Hiraki (Japan) Akemi Nishiya	6–1, 6–4
Loss	4.	Sep 1992	Tokyo Championships, Japan	Hard	(Indonesia) Yayuk Basuki	(United States) Mary Joe Fernandez (United States) Robin White	4–6, 4–6
Win	5.	Oct 1993	Sapporo Open, Tokyo	Hard	(Indonesia) Yayuk Basuki	(Japan) Yone Kamio (Japan) Naoko Kijimuta	6–4, 6–2
Win	6.	Oct 1993	Taipei Championship, Taiwan	Hard	(Indonesia) Yayuk Basuki	(Australia) Jo-Anne Faull (Australia) Kristine Kunce	6–4, 6–2
Loss	7.	Apr 1994	Tokyo Outdoor, Japan	Hard	(Indonesia) Yayuk Basuki	(Japan) Mami Donoshiro (Japan) Ai Sugiyama	4–6, 1–6
Loss	8.	Apr 1994	Pattaya Open, Thailand	Hard	(Indonesia) Yayuk Basuki	(United States) Patty Fendick (United States) Meredith McGrath	6–7, 6–3, 3–6
Loss	9.	Oct 1995	Surabaya Classic, Indonesia	Hard	(United States) Stephanie Reece	(Netherlands) Petra Kamstra (Slovenia) Tina Križan	6–2, 4–6, 1–6
Loss	10.	Nov 1995	Pattaya Open, Thailand	Hard	(Australia) Kristin Godridge	(Canada) Jill Hetherington (Australia) Kristine Kunce	6–2, 4–6, 3–6
Loss	11.	Nov 1996	Ameritech Cup Chicago, United States	Carpet (i)	(United States) Angela Lettiere	(United States) Lisa Raymond (Australia) Rennae Stubbs	1–6, 1–6
Loss	12.	Nov 1996	Pattaya Open, Thailand	Hard	(Slovenia) Tina Križan	(Japan) Miho Saeki (Japan) Yuka Yoshida	2–6, 3–6
Win	13.	Jan 1997	Gold Coast Classic, Australia	Hard	(Japan) Naoko Kijimuta	(Romania) Ruxandra Dragomir (Italy) Silvia Farina	7–6, 6–1
Win	14.	Jan 1997	Hobart International, Australia	Hard	(Japan) Naoko Kijimuta	(Germany) Barbara Rittner (Belgium) Dominique Van Roost	6–3, 6–1
Win	15.	Feb 1997	National Indoors, United States	Hard (i)	(Japan) Rika Hiraki	(United States) Marianne Werdel (United States) Tami Whitlinger	6–4, 6–1
Loss	16.	May 1997	World Doubles Cup, United Kingdom	Clay	(Australia) Rachel McQuillan	(United States) Nicole Arendt (Netherlands) Manon Bollegraf	1–6, 6–3, 7–5
Win	17.	Jan 1998	Auckland Open, New Zealand	Hard	(Thailand) Tamarine Tanasugarn	(France) Julie Halard-Decugis (Slovakia) Janette Husárová	7–6, 6–4
Win	18.	Apr 1998	Japan Women's Open	Hard	(Japan) Naoko Kijimuta	(United States) Amy Frazier (Japan) Rika Hiraki	6–3, 4–6, 6–4
Loss	19.	Oct 2000	Toyota Princess Cup, Japan	Hard	(Argentina) Paola Suárez	(France) Julie Halard-Decugis (Japan) Ai Sugiyama	0–6, 2–6
Win	20.	Oct 2002	Japan Women's Open	Hard	(Japan) Shinobu Asagoe	(Russia) Svetlana Kuznetsova (Spain) Arantxa Sánchez Vicario	6–4, 4–6, 6–4
Loss	21.	Mar 2003	Miami Open, United States	Hard	(Japan) Shinobu Asagoe	(South Africa) Liezel Huber (Bulgaria) Magdalena Maleeva	4–6, 6–3, 5–7
Loss	22.	Apr 2003	Sarasota Classic, United States	Clay	(Japan) Shinobu Asagoe	(South Africa) Liezel Huber (United States) Martina Navratilova	6–7^{(8–10)}, 3–6

== ITF Circuit finals ==
$75,000 tournaments
$50,000 tournaments
$25,000 tournaments
$10,000 tournaments

=== Singles: 11 (4–7) ===
Result	No.	Date	Tournament	Surface	Opponent	Score
Loss	1.	7 August 1988	ITF Roanoke, United States	Hard	(United States) Sandra Birch	6–4, 1–6, 1–6
Win	2.	21 August 1988	ITF Chatham, United States	Hard	(United States) Eleni Rossides	6–0, 7–5
Loss	3.	26 September 1986	ITF Detroit, United States	Hard	(Canada) Patricia Hy-Boulais	2–6, 2–6
Loss	4.	2 August 1992	ITF Williamsburg, United States	Hard	(United States) Stephanie Rehe	2–6, 6–0, 3–6
Win	5.	16 August 1992	ITF Virginia Beach, United States	Hard	(United States) Nicole Arendt	6–2, 6–4
Loss	6.	5 November 1995	ITF Saga, Japan	Grass	(Australia) Kirrily Sharpe	3–6, 6–4, 1–6
Loss	7.	2 November 1997	ITF Austin, United States	Hard	(Switzerland) Emmanuelle Gagliardi	2–6, 6–3, 4–6
Loss	8.	4 April 1999	ITF Clermont, United States	Hard	(Japan) Shinobu Asagoe	7–5, 4–6, 1–6
Win	9.	31 October 1999	ITF Austin, United States	Hard	(United States) Meghann Shaughnessy	4–6, 6–2, 3–1 ret.
Win	10.	17 June 2001	ITF Mt. Pleasant, United States	Hard	(United States) Megan Bradley	6–4, 6–3
Loss	11.	14 October 2001	ITF Saga, Japan	Grass	(Japan) Akiko Morigami	4–6, 5–7

=== Doubles: 46 (31–15) ===
Result	No.	Date	Tournament	Surface	Partner	Opponents	Score
Loss	1.	9 October 1988	ITF Corpus Christi, United States	Hard	(United States) Vincenza Procacci	(United States) Eleni Rossides (United States) Shaun Stafford	3–6, 6–3, 5–7
Win	2.	25 October 1993	ITF Jakarta, Indonesia	Hard	(Japan) Ei Iida	(Australia) Robyn Mawdsley (United Kingdom) Julie Pullin	6–4, 7–5
Win	3.	11 August 1996	ITF Austin, United States	Hard	(United States) Laxmi Poruri	(United States) Audra Keller (Australia) Tracey Morton-Rodgers	5–7, 7–5, 6–2
Win	4.	10 February 1997	Midland Classic, United States	Hard (i)	(United States) Angela Lettiere	(Chinese Taipei) Janet Lee (United States) Lindsay Lee-Waters	6–3, 6–2
Loss	5.	4 August 1997	ITF Salt Lake City, United States	Hard	(Australia) Rachel McQuillan	(United States) Debbie Graham (South Africa) Mariaan de Swardt	6–7, 5–7
Loss	6.	5 October 1997	ITF Santa Clara, United States	Hard	(Australia) Rachel McQuillan	(Australia) Lisa McShea (South Africa) Nannie de Villiers	6–7, 6–7
Win	7.	26 October 1997	ITF Houston, United States	Hard	(Australia) Rachel McQuillan	(United States) Ginger Helgeson-Nielsen (Australia) Kristine Kunce	6–0, 3–6, 6–2
Win	8.	5 October 1998	Albuquerque Championships, United States	Hard	(Australia) Rachel McQuillan	(United States) Erika deLone (Australia) Nicole Pratt	7–6^{(7–5)}, 6–2
Win	9.	25 October 1998	ITF Houston, United States	Hard	(Japan) Miho Saeki	(Japan) Rika Hiraki (South Korea) Kim Eun-ha	6–1, 4–6, 6–1
Win	10.	4 April 1999	ITF Claremont, United States	Hard	(Australia) Rachel McQuillan	(Japan) Rika Hiraki (South Africa) Nannie de Villiers	6–2, 6–3
Loss	11.	2 May 1999	Kangaroo Cup, Japan	Carpet	(Japan) Shiho Hisamatsu	(South Korea) Chae Kyung-yee (South Korea) Cho Yoon-jeong	2–6, 6–4, 2–6
Win	12.	25 July 1999	ITF Peachtree City, United States	Hard	(Japan) Rika Hiraki	(Australia) Annabel Ellwood (Australia) Bryanne Stewart	6–4, 6–1
Win	13.	21 August 1999	Bronx Open, United States	Hard	(South Africa) Surina De Beer	(Netherlands) Seda Noorlander (Austria) Patricia Wartusch	3–6, 6–0, 6–3
Win	14.	26 September 1999	ITF Kirkland, United States	Hard	(United States) Debbie Graham	(Australia) Rachel McQuillan (Australia) Kristine Kunce	6–3, 6–1
Win	15.	3 October 1999	ITF Santa Clara, United States	Hard	(United States) Debbie Graham	(South Africa) Nannie de Villiers (Australia) Nicole Pratt	6–4, 6–4
Win	16.	10 October 1999	Albuquerque Championships, United States	Hard	(United States) Debbie Graham	(Austria) Marion Maruska (India) Nirupama Sanjeev	6–4, 7–5
Win	17.	17 October 1999	ITF Largo, United States	Hard	(United States) Nicole Arendt	(Italy) Francesca Lubiani (United States) Samantha Reeves	6–2, 6–3
Win	18.	19 August 2000	Bronx Open, United States	Hard	(South Africa) Surina De Beer	(France) Alexandra Fusai (France) Émilie Loit	5–7, 6–4, 6–4
Loss	19.	23 October 2000	ITF Dallas, United States	Hard	(India) Nirupama Sanjeev	(United States) Brie Rippner (Ukraine) Elena Tatarkova	3–6, 6–3, 3–6
Win	20.	30 October 2000	ITF Hayward, United States	Hard	(India) Nirupama Sanjeev	(Republic of Ireland) Kelly Liggan (Venezuela) Milagros Sequera	4–2, 4–2
Win	21.	6 November 2000	ITF Pittsburgh, United States	Hard (i)	(India) Nirupama Sanjeev	(Netherlands) Seda Noorlander (Germany) Kirstin Freye	5–7, 6–4, 6–0
Win	22.	19 November 2000	ITF Naples, United States	Clay	(Ukraine) Elena Tatarkova	(Estonia) Maret Ani (Italy) Valentina Sassi	5–3, 2–4, 2–4, 5–3, 4–1
Loss	23.	8 April 2001	ITF West Palm Beach, United States	Clay	(Japan) Rika Hiraki	(Australia) Rachel McQuillan (Australia) Lisa McShea	3–6, 3–6
Win	24.	13 May 2001	Fukuoka International, Japan	Hard	(Japan) Rika Hiraki	(United Kingdom) Julie Pullin (United Kingdom) Lorna Woodroffe	6–0, 7–6^{(7–3)}
Win	25.	15 July 2001	ITF College Park, United States	Hard	(Australia) Lisa McShea	(United States) Dawn Buth (Canada) Vanessa Webb	6–1, 6–4
Win	26.	22 July 2001	ITF Mahwah, United States	Hard	(Australia) Lisa McShea	(United States) Dawn Buth (Canada) Vanessa Webb	6–1, 3–6, 6–2
Win	27.	5 August 2001	Lexington Challenger, United States	Hard	(Australia) Lisa McShea	(United States) Julie Ditty (Venezuela) Milagros Sequera	6–0, 6–4
Loss	28.	30 September 2001	Albuquerque Championships, United States	Hard	(Australia) Lisa McShea	(United States) Marissa Irvin (United States) Katie Schlukebir	4–6, 6–1, 4–6
Win	29.	14 October 2001	ITF Saga, Japan	Grass	(Japan) Rika Hiraki	(Japan) Shiho Hisamatsu (Japan) Maiko Inoue	6–0, 6–1
Win	30.	28 October 2001	ITF Dallas, United States	Hard	(Japan) Rika Hiraki	(Kazakhstan) Irina Selyutina (South Africa) Nannie de Villiers	7–6^{(7–4)}, 6–2
Loss	31.	12 November 2001	ITF Hattiesburg, United States	Hard	(Japan) Rika Hiraki	(Russia) Alina Jidkova (United States) Abigail Spears	3–6, 1–6
Loss	32.	26 November 2002	ITF Minneapolis, United States	Hard (i)	(Japan) Rika Hiraki	(Japan) Shinobu Asagoe (Belgium) Els Callens	6–7^{(3–7)}, 6–7^{(3–7)}
Win	33.	14 April 2002	ITF Naples, United States	Clay	(Japan) Rika Hiraki	(Argentina) Gisela Dulko (Russia) Vera Zvonareva	7–5, 4–6, 7–5
Loss	34.	21 July 2002	ITF Oyster Bay, United States	Hard	(Kazakhstan) Irina Selyutina	(United States) Jennifer Embry (United States) Jessica Lehnhoff	6–4, 4–6, 3–6
Win	35.	28 July 2002	ITF Louisville, United States	Hard	(Kazakhstan) Irina Selyutina	(Japan) Miho Saeki (Czech Republic) Renata Voráčová	5–7, 6–1, 7–5
Win	36.	3 August 2002	Lexington Challenger, United States	Hard	(Kazakhstan) Irina Selyutina	(Australia) Rachel McQuillan (Australia) Lisa McShea	6–7^{(2–7)}, 6–2, 7–5
Loss	37.	18 August 2002	Bronx Open, United States	Hard	(Japan) Shinobu Asagoe	(Estonia) Maret Ani (Italy) Flavia Pennetta	4–6, 1–6
Win	38.	27 October 2002	ITF Frisco, United States	Hard	(United States) Brie Rippner	(United States) Teryn Ashley (United States) Abigail Spears	4–6, 6–4, 6–1
Loss	39.	10 November 2002	ITF Pittsburgh, United States	Hard	(Venezuela) Milagros Sequera	(United States) Amy Frazier (United States) Jennifer Russell	4–6, 2–6
Win	40.	17 November 2002	ITF Eugene, United States	Hard	(Venezuela) Milagros Sequera	(Russia) Evgenia Kulikovskaya (Ukraine) Elena Tatarkova	3–6, 6–2, 6–4
Loss	41.	27 April 2003	Kangaroo Cup, Japan	Grass	(Japan) Shinobu Asagoe	(Japan) Rika Fujiwara (Japan) Saori Obata	6–1, 5–7, 3–6
Win	42.	6 May 2003	Fukuoka International, Japan	Clay	(Latvia) Līga Dekmeijere	(Japan) Saori Obata (Japan) Rika Fujiwara	6–2, 2–6, 6–4
Win	43.	8 June 2003	Surbiton Trophy, United Kingdom	Grass	(Japan) Shinobu Asagoe	(United States) Bethanie Mattek (United States) Lilia Osterloh	7–6, 3–6, 6–4
Loss	44.	4 July 2004	ITF Los Gatos, United States	Hard	(United States) Lilia Osterloh	(Sweden) Sofia Arvidsson (Turkey) İpek Şenoğlu	1–6, 6–2, 4–6
Loss	45.	24 October 2004	ITF Cary, United States	Clay	(Canada) Maureen Drake	(Romania) Ruxandra Dragomir (United States) Samantha Reeves	6–4, 3–6, 3–6
Win	46.	30 November 2004	Palm Beach Gardens Challenger, United States	Clay	(Latvia) Līga Dekmeijere	(United States) Kelly McCain (United States) Kaysie Smashey	6–3, 6–2
