= Commonwealth Bank Tennis Classic =

Defunct tennis tournament
- Founded: 1994
- Abolished: 2008
- Editions: 14
- Location: Bali; Indonesia
- Category: Tier III
- Surface: Hard / outdoors
- Draw: 32S/16Q/16D
- Prize money: $225,000

The Commonwealth Bank Tennis Classic was a tennis tournament on the WTA Tour held in Bali, Indonesia in 2007 and 2008. During the period 1994–2006 it was known as Wismilak International, organized in Surabaya (1994–1997), Kuala Lumpur (1999–2000) and Bali (2001–2006). The tournament was played on outdoor hardcourts. In 2009 the tournament was replaced with the Commonwealth Bank Tournament of Champions.

== Finals ==
=== Singles ===
| Location | Year | Champions | Runners-up | Score |
|---|---|---|---|---|
| Surabaya (Indonesia) | 1994 | (Bulgaria) Elena Wagner | (Japan) Ai Sugiyama | 2–6, 6–0, retired |
| Surabaya (Indonesia) | 1995 | (Chinese Taipei) Wang Shi-ting | (China) Yi Jingqian | 6–1, 6–1 |
| Surabaya (Indonesia) | 1996 | (Chinese Taipei) Wang Shi-ting | (Japan) Nana Miyagi | 6–4, 6–0 |
| Surabaya (Indonesia) | 1997 | (Belgium) Dominique van Roost | (Czech Republic) Lenka Nemecková | 6–1, 6–3 |
| Surabaya (Indonesia) | 1998 | Not held | | |
| Kuala Lumpur (Malaysia) | 1999 | (Sweden) Åsa Carlsson | (United States) Erika deLone | 6–2, 6–4 |
| Kuala Lumpur (Malaysia) | 2000 | (Slovakia) Henrieta Nagyová | (Croatia) Iva Majoli | 6–4, 6–2 |
| Bali (Indonesia) | 2001 | (Indonesia) Angelique Widjaja | (South Africa) Joannette Kruger | 7–6^{(7–2)}, 7–6^{(7–4)} |
| Bali (Indonesia) | 2002 | (Russia) Svetlana Kuznetsova | (Spain) Conchita Martínez | 3–6, 7–6^{(7–4)}, 7–5 |
| Bali (Indonesia) | 2003 | (Russia) Elena Dementieva | (United States) Chanda Rubin | 6–2, 6–1 |
| Bali (Indonesia) | 2004 | (Russia) Svetlana Kuznetsova | (Germany) Marlene Weingärtner | 6–1, 6–4 |
| Bali (Indonesia) | 2005 | (United States) Lindsay Davenport | (Italy) Francesca Schiavone | 6–2, 6–4 |
| Bali (Indonesia) | 2006 | (Russia) Svetlana Kuznetsova | (France) Marion Bartoli | 7–5, 6–2 |
| Bali (Indonesia) | 2007 | (United States) Lindsay Davenport | (Slovakia) Daniela Hantuchová | 6–4, 3–6, 6–2 |
| Bali (Indonesia) | 2008 | (Switzerland) Patty Schnyder | (Austria) Tamira Paszek | 6–3, 6–0 |

=== Doubles ===
| Location | Year | Champions | Runners-up | Score |
|---|---|---|---|---|
| Surabaya (Indonesia) | 1994 | (Indonesia) Yayuk Basuki (Indonesia) Romana Tedjakusuma | (Japan) Kyōko Nagatsuka (Japan) Ai Sugiyama | walkover |
| Surabaya (Indonesia) | 1995 | (Netherlands) Petra Kamstra (Slovenia) Tina Križan | (Japan) Nana Miyagi (United States) Stephanie Reece | 2–6, 6–4, 6–1 |
| Surabaya (Indonesia) | 1996 | (France) Alexandra Fusai (Australia) Kerry-Anne Guse | (Slovenia) Tina Križan (France) Noëlle van Lottum | 6–4, 6–4 |
| Surabaya (Indonesia) | 1997 | (Australia) Kerry-Anne Guse (Japan) Rika Hiraki | (Canada) Maureen Drake (Canada) Renata Kolbovic | 6–1, 7–6 |
| Surabaya (Indonesia) | 1998 | Not held | | |
| Kuala Lumpur (Malaysia) | 1999 | (Croatia) Jelena Kostanić (Slovenia) Tina Pisnik | (Japan) Rika Hiraki (Japan) Yuka Yoshida | 3–6, 6–2, 6–4 |
| Kuala Lumpur (Malaysia) | 2000 | (Slovakia) Henrieta Nagyová (Austria) Sylvia Plischke | (South Africa) Liezel Horn (Canada) Vanessa Webb | 6–4, 7–6^{(7–4)} |
| Bali (Indonesia) | 2001 | (Australia) Evie Dominikovic (Thailand) Tamarine Tanasugarn | (Chinese Taipei) Janet Lee (Indonesia) Wynne Prakusya | 6–7^{(4–7)}, 6–2, 6–3 |
| Bali (Indonesia) | 2002 | (Zimbabwe) Cara Black (Spain) Virginia Ruano Pascual | (Russia) Svetlana Kuznetsova (Spain) Arantxa Sánchez Vicario | 6–2, 6–3 |
| Bali (Indonesia) | 2003 | (Venezuela) María Vento-Kabchi (Indonesia) Angelique Widjaja | (France) Émilie Loit (Australia) Nicole Pratt | 7–5, 6–2 |
| Bali (Indonesia) | 2004 | (Russia) Anastasia Myskina (Japan) Ai Sugiyama | (Russia) Svetlana Kuznetsova (Spain) Arantxa Sánchez Vicario | 6–3, 7–5 |
| Bali (Indonesia) | 2005 | (Germany) Anna-Lena Grönefeld (United States) Meghann Shaughnessy | (China) Yan Zi (China) Zheng Jie | 6–3, 6–3 |
| Bali (Indonesia) | 2006 | (United States) Lindsay Davenport (United States) Corina Morariu | (South Africa) Natalie Grandin (Australia) Trudi Musgrave | 6–3, 6–4 |
| Bali (Indonesia) | 2007 | (China) Sun Shengnan (China) Ji Chunmei | (United States) Jill Craybas (South Africa) Natalie Grandin | 6–3, 6–2 |
| Bali (Indonesia) | 2008 | (Chinese Taipei) Hsieh Su-wei (China) Peng Shuai | (Poland) Marta Domachowska (Russia) Nadia Petrova | 6–7^{(4–7)}, 7–6^{(7–3)}, [10–7] |
