= 1998 WTA Tour =

Women's tennis circuit

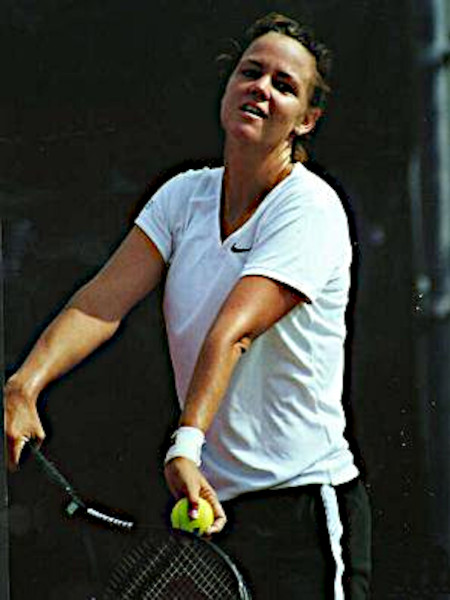
- Lindsay Davenport finished the year as world No. 1 for the first time in her career. She won six tournaments during the season, including a major at the US Open. She also won two Tier I events.

Details
- Duration: January 5 – November 23, 1998
- Edition: 28th
- Tournaments: 52
- Categories: Grand Slam (4); WTA Championships; Grand Slam Cup; WTA Tier I (9); WTA Tier II (15); WTA Tier III (12); WTA Tier IV (11)

Achievements (singles)
- Most titles: (United States) Lindsay Davenport (6)
- Most finals: (United States) Lindsay Davenport (10)
- Prize money leader: (Switzerland) Martina Hingis (US$3,375,989)
- Points leader: (United States) Lindsay Davenport (5,654)

Awards
- Player of the year: (United States) Lindsay Davenport
- Doubles team of the year: (Switzerland) Martina Hingis (Czech Republic) Jana Novotná
- Most improved player of the year: (Switzerland) Patty Schnyder
- Newcomer of the year: (United States) Serena Williams
- Comeback player of the year: (United States) Monica Seles

The WTA Tour is the elite tour for professional women's tennis organised by the Women's Tennis Association (WTA). The WTA Tour includes the four Grand Slam tournaments, the WTA Tour Championships and the WTA Tier I, Tier II, Tier III and Tier IV events. ITF tournaments are not part of the WTA Tour, although they award points for the WTA World Ranking.

== Schedule ==
This is the complete schedule of events on the 1998 WTA Tour, with player progression documented from the quarter-final stage.

=== Key ===
Grand Slam events
Year-end championships
WTA Tier I tournaments
WTA Tier II events
WTA Tier III events
WTA Tier IV events
Team events

=== January ===
Week	Tournament	Champions	Runners-up	Semifinalists	Quarterfinalists
5 Jan	Hyundai Hopman Cup; Perth, Australia; ITF Mixed Teams Championships; Hard (i) – A$1,000,000 – 8 teams (RR)	Slovakia; 2–1	France	Round robin (Group A) Australia; Sweden; Spain	Round robin (Group B) South Africa; United States; Germany
5 Jan	Thalgo Hardcourt Championships; Gold Coast, Australia; Tier III event Hard – $164,250 – 30S/32Q/16D; Singles – Doubles	(Japan) Ai Sugiyama; 7–5, 6–0	(Venezuela) María Vento	(Austria) Sylvia Plischke (Chinese Taipei) Wang Shi-ting	(Netherlands) Brenda Schultz-McCarthy (South Africa) Mariaan de Swardt (France) Sarah Pitkowski (Romania) Ruxandra Dragomir
5 Jan	Thalgo Hardcourt Championships; Gold Coast, Australia; Tier III event Hard – $164,250 – 30S/32Q/16D; Singles – Doubles	(Russia) Elena Likhovtseva (Japan) Ai Sugiyama; 1–6, 6–3, 6–4	(South Korea) Park Sung-hee (Chinese Taipei) Wang Shi-ting	(Austria) Sylvia Plischke (Chinese Taipei) Wang Shi-ting	(Netherlands) Brenda Schultz-McCarthy (South Africa) Mariaan de Swardt (France) Sarah Pitkowski (Romania) Ruxandra Dragomir
5 Jan	ASB Bank Classic; Auckland, New Zealand; Tier IV event Hard – $107,500 – 32S/32Q/16D; Singles – Doubles	(Belgium) Dominique Van Roost; 4–6, 7–6^{(11–9)}, 7–5	(Italy) Silvia Farina	(France) Sandrine Testud (United States) Anne Miller	(United States) Sandra Cacic (France) Julie Halard-Decugis (Thailand) Tamarine Tanasugarn (United States) Lisa Raymond
5 Jan	ASB Bank Classic; Auckland, New Zealand; Tier IV event Hard – $107,500 – 32S/32Q/16D; Singles – Doubles	(Japan) Nana Miyagi (Thailand) Tamarine Tanasugarn; 7–6^{(7–1)}, 6–4	(France) Julie Halard-Decugis (Slovakia) Janette Husárová	(France) Sandrine Testud (United States) Anne Miller	(United States) Sandra Cacic (France) Julie Halard-Decugis (Thailand) Tamarine Tanasugarn (United States) Lisa Raymond
12 Jan	Adidas International; Sydney, Australia; Tier II event Hard – $342,500 – 28S/32Q/16D; Singles – Doubles	(Spain) Arantxa Sánchez Vicario; 6–1, 6–3	(United States) Venus Williams	(Japan) Ai Sugiyama (United States) Serena Williams	(Bulgaria) Magdalena Maleeva (Austria) Barbara Paulus (Belarus) Natasha Zvereva (United States) Lindsay Davenport
12 Jan	Adidas International; Sydney, Australia; Tier II event Hard – $342,500 – 28S/32Q/16D; Singles – Doubles	(Switzerland) Martina Hingis (Czech Republic) Helena Suková; 6–1, 6–2	(United States) Katrina Adams (United States) Meredith McGrath	(Japan) Ai Sugiyama (United States) Serena Williams	(Bulgaria) Magdalena Maleeva (Austria) Barbara Paulus (Belarus) Natasha Zvereva (United States) Lindsay Davenport
12 Jan	ANZ Tasmanian International; Hobart, Australia; Tier IV event Hard – $107,500 – 32S/32Q/16D; Singles – Doubles	(Switzerland) Patty Schnyder; 6–3, 6–2	(Belgium) Dominique Van Roost	(Poland) Magdalena Grzybowska (South Africa) Joannette Kruger	(China) Li Fang (Slovakia) Henrieta Nagyová (France) Anne-Gaëlle Sidot (Austria) Barbara Schett
12 Jan	ANZ Tasmanian International; Hobart, Australia; Tier IV event Hard – $107,500 – 32S/32Q/16D; Singles – Doubles	(Spain) Virginia Ruano Pascual (Argentina) Paola Suárez; 7–6^{(8–6)}, 6–3	(France) Julie Halard-Decugis (Slovakia) Janette Husárová	(Poland) Magdalena Grzybowska (South Africa) Joannette Kruger	(China) Li Fang (Slovakia) Henrieta Nagyová (France) Anne-Gaëlle Sidot (Austria) Barbara Schett
19 Jan; 26 Jan	Australian Open; Melbourne, Australia; Grand Slam; Hard – $3,217,298 – 128S/64Q/64D/32X; Singles – Doubles – Mixed doubles	(Switzerland) Martina Hingis; 6–3, 6–3	(Spain) Conchita Martínez	(Germany) Anke Huber (United States) Lindsay Davenport	(France) Mary Pierce (Spain) Arantxa Sánchez Vicario (France) Sandrine Testud (United States) Venus Williams
19 Jan; 26 Jan	Australian Open; Melbourne, Australia; Grand Slam; Hard – $3,217,298 – 128S/64Q/64D/32X; Singles – Doubles – Mixed doubles	(Switzerland) Martina Hingis (Croatia) Mirjana Lučić; 6–4, 2–6, 6–3	(United States) Lindsay Davenport (Belarus) Natasha Zvereva	(Germany) Anke Huber (United States) Lindsay Davenport	(France) Mary Pierce (Spain) Arantxa Sánchez Vicario (France) Sandrine Testud (United States) Venus Williams
19 Jan; 26 Jan	Australian Open; Melbourne, Australia; Grand Slam; Hard – $3,217,298 – 128S/64Q/64D/32X; Singles – Doubles – Mixed doubles	(United States) Justin Gimelstob (United States) Venus Williams; 6–2, 6–1	(Czech Republic) Cyril Suk (Czech Republic) Helena Suková	(Germany) Anke Huber (United States) Lindsay Davenport	(France) Mary Pierce (Spain) Arantxa Sánchez Vicario (France) Sandrine Testud (United States) Venus Williams

=== February ===
Week	Tournament	Champions	Runners-up	Semifinalists	Quarterfinalists
2 Feb	Toray Pan Pacific Open; Tokyo, Japan; Tier I event Carpet (i) – $926,250 – 28S/32Q/16D; Singles – Doubles	(United States) Lindsay Davenport; 6–3, 6–3	(Switzerland) Martina Hingis	(Croatia) Iva Majoli (South Africa) Amanda Coetzer	(Italy) Rita Grande (Japan) Miho Saeki (Japan) Ai Sugiyama (Romania) Irina Spîrlea
2 Feb	Toray Pan Pacific Open; Tokyo, Japan; Tier I event Carpet (i) – $926,250 – 28S/32Q/16D; Singles – Doubles	(Switzerland) Martina Hingis (Croatia) Mirjana Lučić; 7–5, 6–4	(United States) Lindsay Davenport (Belarus) Natasha Zvereva	(Croatia) Iva Majoli (South Africa) Amanda Coetzer	(Italy) Rita Grande (Japan) Miho Saeki (Japan) Ai Sugiyama (Romania) Irina Spîrlea
9 Feb	Open Gaz de France; Paris, France; Tier II event Hard (i) – $450,000 – 28S/32Q/16D; Singles – Doubles	(France) Mary Pierce; 6–3, 7–5	(Belgium) Dominique Van Roost	(Czech Republic) Jana Novotná (France) Nathalie Tauziat	(Austria) Barbara Paulus (Germany) Anke Huber (France) Sarah Pitkowski (Croatia) Iva Majoli
9 Feb	Open Gaz de France; Paris, France; Tier II event Hard (i) – $450,000 – 28S/32Q/16D; Singles – Doubles	(Belgium) Sabine Appelmans (Netherlands) Miriam Oremans; 1–6, 6–3, 7–6^{(7–3)}	(Russia) Anna Kournikova (Latvia) Larisa Savchenko	(Czech Republic) Jana Novotná (France) Nathalie Tauziat	(Austria) Barbara Paulus (Germany) Anke Huber (France) Sarah Pitkowski (Croatia) Iva Majoli
16 Feb	Faber Grand Prix; Hanover, Germany; Tier II event Hard (i) – $450,000 – 28S/32Q/16D; Singles – Doubles	(Switzerland) Patty Schnyder; 6–0, 2–6, 7–5	(Czech Republic) Jana Novotná	(Russia) Anna Kournikova (Belgium) Sabine Appelmans	(United States) Lisa Raymond (Germany) Anke Huber (France) Nathalie Tauziat (Germany) Steffi Graf
16 Feb	Faber Grand Prix; Hanover, Germany; Tier II event Hard (i) – $450,000 – 28S/32Q/16D; Singles – Doubles	(United States) Lisa Raymond (Australia) Rennae Stubbs; 6–1, 6–7^{(4–7)}, 6–3	(Russia) Elena Likhovtseva (Netherlands) Caroline Vis	(Russia) Anna Kournikova (Belgium) Sabine Appelmans	(United States) Lisa Raymond (Germany) Anke Huber (France) Nathalie Tauziat (Germany) Steffi Graf
16 Feb	Copa Colsanitas; Bogotá, Colombia; Tier IV event Clay (red) – $107,500 – 32S/32Q/16D; Singles – Doubles	(Argentina) Paola Suárez; 6–3, 6–4	(Canada) Sonya Jeyaseelan	(Paraguay) Larissa Schaerer (Spain) Conchita Martínez Granados	(United States) Corina Morariu (Slovakia) Janette Husárová (Colombia) Fabiola Zuluaga (Belgium) Laurence Courtois
16 Feb	Copa Colsanitas; Bogotá, Colombia; Tier IV event Clay (red) – $107,500 – 32S/32Q/16D; Singles – Doubles	(Slovakia) Janette Husárová (Argentina) Paola Suárez; 3–6, 6–2, 6–3	(United States) Melissa Mazzotta (Russia) Ekaterina Sysoeva	(Paraguay) Larissa Schaerer (Spain) Conchita Martínez Granados	(United States) Corina Morariu (Slovakia) Janette Husárová (Colombia) Fabiola Zuluaga (Belgium) Laurence Courtois
23 Feb	Generali Ladies Tennis Grand Prix; Linz, Austria; Tier II event Carpet (i) – $450,000 – 28S/32Q/16D; Singles – Doubles	(Czech Republic) Jana Novotná; 6–1, 7–6^{(7–2)}	(Belgium) Dominique Van Roost	(Italy) Silvia Farina (Croatia) Iva Majoli	(Russia) Anna Kournikova (France) Nathalie Tauziat (Belgium) Sabine Appelmans (United States) Lisa Raymond
23 Feb	Generali Ladies Tennis Grand Prix; Linz, Austria; Tier II event Carpet (i) – $450,000 – 28S/32Q/16D; Singles – Doubles	(France) Alexandra Fusai (France) Nathalie Tauziat; 6–3, 3–6, 6–4	(Russia) Anna Kournikova (Latvia) Larisa Savchenko	(Italy) Silvia Farina (Croatia) Iva Majoli	(Russia) Anna Kournikova (France) Nathalie Tauziat (Belgium) Sabine Appelmans (United States) Lisa Raymond
23 Feb	IGA Tennis Classic; Oklahoma City, United States; Tier III event $164, 250 – hard (i) – 30S/32Q/16D; Singles – Doubles	(United States) Venus Williams; 6–3, 6–2	(South Africa) Joannette Kruger	(United States) Lindsay Davenport (France) Sarah Pitkowski	(France) Lea Ghirardi (Italy) Francesca Lubiani (United States) Serena Williams (France) Sandrine Testud
23 Feb	IGA Tennis Classic; Oklahoma City, United States; Tier III event $164, 250 – hard (i) – 30S/32Q/16D; Singles – Doubles	(United States) Serena Williams (United States) Venus Williams; 7–5, 6–2	(Romania) Cătălina Cristea (Australia) Kristine Kunce	(United States) Lindsay Davenport (France) Sarah Pitkowski	(France) Lea Ghirardi (Italy) Francesca Lubiani (United States) Serena Williams (France) Sandrine Testud

=== March ===
Week	Tournament	Champions	Runners-up	Semifinalists	Quarterfinalists
2 Mar; 9 Mar	State Farm Evert Cup; Indian Wells, United States; Tier I event Hard – $1,250,000 – 56S/32Q/28D; Singles – Doubles	(Switzerland) Martina Hingis; 6–3, 6–4	(United States) Lindsay Davenport	(United States) Venus Williams (Germany) Steffi Graf	(Spain) Conchita Martínez (South Africa) Joannette Kruger (Belarus) Natasha Zvereva (United States) Sandra Cacic
2 Mar; 9 Mar	State Farm Evert Cup; Indian Wells, United States; Tier I event Hard – $1,250,000 – 56S/32Q/28D; Singles – Doubles	(United States) Lindsay Davenport (Belarus) Natasha Zvereva; 6–4, 2–6, 6–4	(France) Alexandra Fusai (France) Nathalie Tauziat	(United States) Venus Williams (Germany) Steffi Graf	(Spain) Conchita Martínez (South Africa) Joannette Kruger (Belarus) Natasha Zvereva (United States) Sandra Cacic
16 Mar; 23 Mar	Lipton Championships; Key Biscayne, United States; Tier I event Hard – $1,900,000 – 96S/64Q/48D; Singles – Doubles	(United States) Venus Williams; 2–6, 6–4, 6–1	(Russia) Anna Kournikova	(Switzerland) Martina Hingis (Spain) Arantxa Sánchez Vicario	(United States) Serena Williams (Italy) Silvia Farina (Czech Republic) Jana Novotná (United States) Lindsay Davenport
16 Mar; 23 Mar	Lipton Championships; Key Biscayne, United States; Tier I event Hard – $1,900,000 – 96S/64Q/48D; Singles – Doubles	(Switzerland) Martina Hingis (Czech Republic) Jana Novotná; 6–2, 3–6, 6–3	(Spain) Arantxa Sánchez Vicario (Belarus) Natasha Zvereva	(Switzerland) Martina Hingis (Spain) Arantxa Sánchez Vicario	(United States) Serena Williams (Italy) Silvia Farina (Czech Republic) Jana Novotná (United States) Lindsay Davenport
30 Mar	Family Circle Magazine Cup; Hilton Head Island, United States; Tier I event Clay – $926,250 (green) – 56S/32Q/28D; Singles – Doubles	(South Africa) Amanda Coetzer; 6–3, 6–4	(Romania) Irina Spîrlea	(United States) Monica Seles (United States) Lisa Raymond	(United States) Lindsay Davenport (Switzerland) Patty Schnyder (Germany) Andrea Glass (Spain) Magüi Serna
30 Mar	Family Circle Magazine Cup; Hilton Head Island, United States; Tier I event Clay – $926,250 (green) – 56S/32Q/28D; Singles – Doubles	(Spain) Conchita Martínez (Argentina) Patricia Tarabini; 3–6, 6–4, 6–4	(United States) Lisa Raymond (Australia) Rennae Stubbs	(United States) Monica Seles (United States) Lisa Raymond	(United States) Lindsay Davenport (Switzerland) Patty Schnyder (Germany) Andrea Glass (Spain) Magüi Serna

=== April ===
Week	Tournament	Champions	Runners-up	Semifinalists	Quarterfinalists
6 Apr	Bausch & Lomb Championships; Amelia Island, United States; Tier II event Clay – $450,000 (green) – 56S/32Q/28D; Singles – Doubles	(France) Mary Pierce; 6–7^{(8–10)}, 6–0, 6–2	(Spain) Conchita Martínez	(United States) Lindsay Davenport (South Africa) Amanda Coetzer	(Russia) Anna Kournikova (Croatia) Iva Majoli (United States) Lisa Raymond (United States) Tara Snyder
6 Apr	Bausch & Lomb Championships; Amelia Island, United States; Tier II event Clay – $450,000 (green) – 56S/32Q/28D; Singles – Doubles	(United States) Sandra Cacic (France) Mary Pierce; 7–6^{(7–5)}, 4–6, 7–6^{(7–5)}	(Austria) Barbara Schett (Switzerland) Patty Schnyder	(United States) Lindsay Davenport (South Africa) Amanda Coetzer	(Russia) Anna Kournikova (Croatia) Iva Majoli (United States) Lisa Raymond (United States) Tara Snyder
13 Apr	Japan Open; Tokyo, Japan; Tier III event Hard – $164,250 – 32S/32Q/16D; Singles – Doubles	(Japan) Ai Sugiyama; 6–3, 6–3	(United States) Corina Morariu	(Chinese Taipei) Wang Shi-ting (United States) Amy Frazier	(United States) Erika deLone (United States) Lori McNeil (Australia) Nicole Pratt (Japan) Naoko Sawamatsu
13 Apr	Japan Open; Tokyo, Japan; Tier III event Hard – $164,250 – 32S/32Q/16D; Singles – Doubles	(Japan) Naoko Kijimuta (Japan) Nana Miyagi; 6–3, 4–6, 6–4	(United States) Amy Frazier (Japan) Rika Hiraki	(Chinese Taipei) Wang Shi-ting (United States) Amy Frazier	(United States) Erika deLone (United States) Lori McNeil (Australia) Nicole Pratt (Japan) Naoko Sawamatsu
13 Apr	Makarska International Championships; Makarska, Croatia; Tier IV event Clay (red) – $107,500 – 32S/32Q/16D; Singles – Doubles	(Czech Republic) Květa Hrdličková; 6–3, 6–1	(China) Li Fang	(Spain) Gala León García (Czech Republic) Lenka Němečková	(Argentina) Paola Suárez (Spain) Ana Alcázar (Germany) Sandra Klösel (Ukraine) Olga Lugina
13 Apr	Makarska International Championships; Makarska, Croatia; Tier IV event Clay (red) – $107,500 – 32S/32Q/16D; Singles – Doubles	(Slovenia) Tina Križan (Slovenia) Katarina Srebotnik; 7–6^{(7–3)}, 6–1	(Russia) Evgenia Kulikovskaya (Germany) Karin Kschwendt	(Spain) Gala León García (Czech Republic) Lenka Němečková	(Argentina) Paola Suárez (Spain) Ana Alcázar (Germany) Sandra Klösel (Ukraine) Olga Lugina
13 Apr	Fed Cup: Quarterfinals; Ghent, Belgium – hard (i); Brno, Czech Republic – carpet (i); Saarbrücken, Germany – carpet (i); Kiawah Island, United States – clay (red)	Quarterfinals Winners; France 3–2; Switzerland 4–1; Spain 3–2; United States 5–0	Quarterfinals Losers; Belgium; Czech Republic; Germany; Netherlands		
20 Apr	Lotto-Westel 900 Budapest Open; Budapest, Hungary; Tier IV event Clay (red) – $107,500 – 32S/32Q/16D; Singles – Doubles	(Spain) Virginia Ruano Pascual; 6–4, 4–6, 6–3	(Italy) Silvia Farina	(China) Li Fang (France) Sarah Pitkowski	(France) Sandrine Testud (Spain) María Sánchez Lorenzo (France) Julie Halard-Decugis (Hungary) Rita Kuti-Kis
20 Apr	Lotto-Westel 900 Budapest Open; Budapest, Hungary; Tier IV event Clay (red) – $107,500 – 32S/32Q/16D; Singles – Doubles	(Spain) Virginia Ruano Pascual (Argentina) Paola Suárez; 4–6, 6–1, 6–1	(Romania) Cătălina Cristea (Argentina) Laura Montalvo	(China) Li Fang (France) Sarah Pitkowski	(France) Sandrine Testud (Spain) María Sánchez Lorenzo (France) Julie Halard-Decugis (Hungary) Rita Kuti-Kis
27 Apr	Intersport Ladies GP; Hamburg, Germany; Tier II event Clay (red) – $450,000 – 28S/32Q/16D; Singles – Doubles	(Switzerland) Martina Hingis; 6–3, 7–5	(Czech Republic) Jana Novotná	(Austria) Barbara Schett (Switzerland) Patty Schnyder	(United States) Jennifer Capriati (Spain) Virginia Ruano Pascual (Spain) Arantxa Sánchez Vicario (Germany) Julia Abe
27 Apr	Intersport Ladies GP; Hamburg, Germany; Tier II event Clay (red) – $450,000 – 28S/32Q/16D; Singles – Doubles	(Austria) Barbara Schett (Switzerland) Patty Schnyder; 7–6^{(7–3)}, 3–6, 6–3	(Switzerland) Martina Hingis (Czech Republic) Jana Novotná	(Austria) Barbara Schett (Switzerland) Patty Schnyder	(United States) Jennifer Capriati (Spain) Virginia Ruano Pascual (Spain) Arantxa Sánchez Vicario (Germany) Julia Abe
27 Apr	Croatian Bol Ladies Open; Bol, Croatia; Tier IV event Clay (red) – $107,500 – 32S/32Q/16D; Singles – Doubles	(Croatia) Mirjana Lučić; 6–2, 6–4	(United States) Corina Morariu	(South Africa) Joannette Kruger (Croatia) Silvija Talaja	(Romania) Raluca Sandu (Argentina) Mariana Díaz Oliva (France) Lea Ghirardi (Italy) Anna-Maria Cecchini
27 Apr	Croatian Bol Ladies Open; Bol, Croatia; Tier IV event Clay (red) – $107,500 – 32S/32Q/16D; Singles – Doubles	(Argentina) Laura Montalvo (Argentina) Paola Suárez walkover	(South Africa) Joannette Kruger (Croatia) Mirjana Lučić	(South Africa) Joannette Kruger (Croatia) Silvija Talaja	(Romania) Raluca Sandu (Argentina) Mariana Díaz Oliva (France) Lea Ghirardi (Italy) Anna-Maria Cecchini

=== May ===
Week	Tournament	Champions	Runners-up	Semifinalists	Quarterfinalists
4 May	Campionati Internazionali d'Italia; Rome, Italy; Tier I event Clay (red) – $926,250 – 56S/32Q/28D; Singles – Doubles	(Switzerland) Martina Hingis; 6–3, 2–6, 6–3	(United States) Venus Williams	(Croatia) Mirjana Lučić (Spain) Arantxa Sánchez Vicario	(Russia) Anna Kournikova (France) Sandrine Testud (United States) Lisa Raymond (United States) Serena Williams
4 May	Campionati Internazionali d'Italia; Rome, Italy; Tier I event Clay (red) – $926,250 – 56S/32Q/28D; Singles – Doubles	(Spain) Virginia Ruano Pascual (Argentina) Paola Suárez; 7–6^{(7–1)}, 6–4	(South Africa) Amanda Coetzer (Spain) Arantxa Sánchez Vicario	(Croatia) Mirjana Lučić (Spain) Arantxa Sánchez Vicario	(Russia) Anna Kournikova (France) Sandrine Testud (United States) Lisa Raymond (United States) Serena Williams
11 May	German Open; Berlin, Germany; Tier I event Clay (red) – $926,250 – 56S/32Q/28D; Singles – Doubles	(Spain) Conchita Martínez; 6–4, 6–4	(France) Amélie Mauresmo	(Russia) Anna Kournikova (Czech Republic) Jana Novotná	(Switzerland) Martina Hingis (Japan) Ai Sugiyama (Romania) Irina Spîrlea (Austria) Barbara Paulus
11 May	German Open; Berlin, Germany; Tier I event Clay (red) – $926,250 – 56S/32Q/28D; Singles – Doubles	(United States) Lindsay Davenport (Belarus) Natasha Zvereva; 6–3, 6–0	(France) Alexandra Fusai (France) Nathalie Tauziat	(Russia) Anna Kournikova (Czech Republic) Jana Novotná	(Switzerland) Martina Hingis (Japan) Ai Sugiyama (Romania) Irina Spîrlea (Austria) Barbara Paulus
18 May	Páginas Amarillas Open; Madrid, Spain; Tier III event Clay (red) – $164,250 – 30S/32Q/16D; Singles – Doubles	(Switzerland) Patty Schnyder; 3–6, 6–4, 6–0	(Belgium) Dominique Van Roost	(France) Sandrine Testud (Austria) Barbara Schett	(United States) Chanda Rubin (Spain) Magüi Serna (United States) Tara Snyder (Netherlands) Kristie Boogert
18 May	Páginas Amarillas Open; Madrid, Spain; Tier III event Clay (red) – $164,250 – 30S/32Q/16D; Singles – Doubles	(Argentina) Florencia Labat (Belgium) Dominique Van Roost; 6–3, 6–1	(Australia) Rachel McQuillan (Australia) Nicole Pratt	(France) Sandrine Testud (Austria) Barbara Schett	(United States) Chanda Rubin (Spain) Magüi Serna (United States) Tara Snyder (Netherlands) Kristie Boogert
18 May	Internationaux de Strasbourg; Strasbourg, France; Tier III event Clay (red) – $200,000 – 30S/32Q/16D; Singles – Doubles	(Romania) Irina Spîrlea; 7–6^{(7–5)}, 6–3	(France) Julie Halard-Decugis	(Russia) Elena Likhovtseva (France) Alexandra Fusai	(South Africa) Amanda Coetzer (France) Nathalie Tauziat (Japan) Ai Sugiyama (Slovakia) Henrieta Nagyová
18 May	Internationaux de Strasbourg; Strasbourg, France; Tier III event Clay (red) – $200,000 – 30S/32Q/16D; Singles – Doubles	(France) Alexandra Fusai (France) Nathalie Tauziat; 6–4, 6–3	(Indonesia) Yayuk Basuki (Netherlands) Caroline Vis	(Russia) Elena Likhovtseva (France) Alexandra Fusai	(South Africa) Amanda Coetzer (France) Nathalie Tauziat (Japan) Ai Sugiyama (Slovakia) Henrieta Nagyová
25 May; 1 Jun	French Open; Paris, France; Grand Slam; Clay (red) – $4,105,011 – 128S/64Q/64D/48X; Singles – Doubles – Mixed doubles	(Spain) Arantxa Sánchez Vicario; 7–6^{(7–5)}, 0–6, 6–2	(United States) Monica Seles	(Switzerland) Martina Hingis (United States) Lindsay Davenport	(United States) Venus Williams (Czech Republic) Jana Novotná (Switzerland) Patty Schnyder (Croatia) Iva Majoli
25 May; 1 Jun	French Open; Paris, France; Grand Slam; Clay (red) – $4,105,011 – 128S/64Q/64D/48X; Singles – Doubles – Mixed doubles	(Switzerland) Martina Hingis (Czech Republic) Jana Novotná; 6–1, 7–6^{(7–4)}	(United States) Lindsay Davenport (Belarus) Natasha Zvereva	(Switzerland) Martina Hingis (United States) Lindsay Davenport	(United States) Venus Williams (Czech Republic) Jana Novotná (Switzerland) Patty Schnyder (Croatia) Iva Majoli
25 May; 1 Jun	French Open; Paris, France; Grand Slam; Clay (red) – $4,105,011 – 128S/64Q/64D/48X; Singles – Doubles – Mixed doubles	(United States) Justin Gimelstob (United States) Venus Williams; 6–4, 6–4	(Argentina) Luis Lobo (United States) Serena Williams	(Switzerland) Martina Hingis (United States) Lindsay Davenport	(United States) Venus Williams (Czech Republic) Jana Novotná (Switzerland) Patty Schnyder (Croatia) Iva Majoli

=== June ===
Week	Tournament	Champions	Runners-up	Semifinalists	Quarterfinalists
8 Jun	DFS Classic; Birmingham, Great Britain; Tier III event Grass – $164,250 – 48S/32Q/16D; Singles – Doubles	Cancelled due to rain		(Germany) Steffi Graf (France) Nathalie Tauziat (Russia) Elena Likhovtseva (Indonesia) Yayuk Basuki	(Spain) Magüi Serna (Australia) Kerry-Anne Guse (Belgium) Dominique Van Roost (Romania) Irina Spîrlea
8 Jun	DFS Classic; Birmingham, Great Britain; Tier III event Grass – $164,250 – 48S/32Q/16D; Singles – Doubles	(Belgium) Els Callens (France) Julie Halard-Decugis; 2–6, 6–4, 6–4	(United States) Lisa Raymond (Australia) Rennae Stubbs	(Germany) Steffi Graf (France) Nathalie Tauziat (Russia) Elena Likhovtseva (Indonesia) Yayuk Basuki	(Spain) Magüi Serna (Australia) Kerry-Anne Guse (Belgium) Dominique Van Roost (Romania) Irina Spîrlea
15 Jun	Direct Line Insurance Championships; Eastbourne, Great Britain; Tier II event Grass – $450,000 – 28S/32Q/16D; Singles – Doubles	(Czech Republic) Jana Novotná; 6–1, 7–5	(Spain) Arantxa Sánchez Vicario	(Belarus) Natasha Zvereva (Russia) Anna Kournikova	(Romania) Irina Spîrlea (Spain) Magüi Serna (United States) Serena Williams (Germany) Steffi Graf
15 Jun	Direct Line Insurance Championships; Eastbourne, Great Britain; Tier II event Grass – $450,000 – 28S/32Q/16D; Singles – Doubles	(South Africa) Mariaan de Swardt (Czech Republic) Jana Novotná; 6–1, 6–3	(Spain) Arantxa Sánchez Vicario (Belarus) Natasha Zvereva	(Belarus) Natasha Zvereva (Russia) Anna Kournikova	(Romania) Irina Spîrlea (Spain) Magüi Serna (United States) Serena Williams (Germany) Steffi Graf
15 Jun	Heineken Trophy 's-Hertogenbosch, Netherlands; Tier III event Grass – $164,250 – 30S/16D; Singles – Doubles	(France) Julie Halard-Decugis; 6–3, 6–4	(Netherlands) Miriam Oremans	(United States) Kimberly Po (France) Sandrine Testud	(United States) Chanda Rubin (Netherlands) Kristie Boogert (Belgium) Sabine Appelmans (Spain) Gala León García
15 Jun	Heineken Trophy 's-Hertogenbosch, Netherlands; Tier III event Grass – $164,250 – 30S/16D; Singles – Doubles	(Belgium) Sabine Appelmans (Netherlands) Miriam Oremans; 6–7^{(4–7)}, 7–6^{(8–6)}, 7–6^{(7–5)}	(Romania) Cătălina Cristea (Czech Republic) Eva Melicharová	(United States) Kimberly Po (France) Sandrine Testud	(United States) Chanda Rubin (Netherlands) Kristie Boogert (Belgium) Sabine Appelmans (Spain) Gala León García
22 Jun; 29 Jun	Wimbledon Championships; London, Great Britain; Grand Slam; Grass – $4,404,163 – 128S/64QS/64D/16QD/64X; Singles – Doubles – Mixed doubles	(Czech Republic) Jana Novotná; 6–4, 7–6^{(7–2)}	(France) Nathalie Tauziat	(Switzerland) Martina Hingis (Belarus) Natasha Zvereva	(Spain) Arantxa Sánchez Vicario (United States) Venus Williams (United States) Monica Seles (United States) Lindsay Davenport
22 Jun; 29 Jun	Wimbledon Championships; London, Great Britain; Grand Slam; Grass – $4,404,163 – 128S/64QS/64D/16QD/64X; Singles – Doubles – Mixed doubles	(Switzerland) Martina Hingis (Czech Republic) Jana Novotná; 6–3, 3–6, 8–6	(United States) Lindsay Davenport (Belarus) Natasha Zvereva	(Switzerland) Martina Hingis (Belarus) Natasha Zvereva	(Spain) Arantxa Sánchez Vicario (United States) Venus Williams (United States) Monica Seles (United States) Lindsay Davenport
22 Jun; 29 Jun	Wimbledon Championships; London, Great Britain; Grand Slam; Grass – $4,404,163 – 128S/64QS/64D/16QD/64X; Singles – Doubles – Mixed doubles	(Belarus) Max Mirnyi (United States) Serena Williams; 6–4, 6–4	(India) Mahesh Bhupathi (Croatia) Mirjana Lučić	(Switzerland) Martina Hingis (Belarus) Natasha Zvereva	(Spain) Arantxa Sánchez Vicario (United States) Venus Williams (United States) Monica Seles (United States) Lindsay Davenport

=== July ===
Week	Tournament	Champions	Runners-up	Semifinalists	Quarterfinalists
6 Jul	Skoda Czech Open; Prague, Czech Republic; Tier III event Clay (red) – $160,000 – 32S/32Q/16D; Singles – Doubles	(Czech Republic) Jana Novotná; 6–3, 6–0	(France) Sandrine Testud	(Slovakia) Henrieta Nagyová (Belarus) Natasha Zvereva	(France) Sarah Pitkowski (United States) Meghann Shaughnessy (France) Amélie Mauresmo (Italy) Silvia Farina
6 Jul	Skoda Czech Open; Prague, Czech Republic; Tier III event Clay (red) – $160,000 – 32S/32Q/16D; Singles – Doubles	(Italy) Silvia Farina (Slovakia) Karina Habšudová; 2–6, 6–1, 6–2	(Czech Republic) Květa Hrdličková (Czech Republic) Michaela Paštiková	(Slovakia) Henrieta Nagyová (Belarus) Natasha Zvereva	(France) Sarah Pitkowski (United States) Meghann Shaughnessy (France) Amélie Mauresmo (Italy) Silvia Farina
6 Jul	Piberstein Styria Open; Maria Lankowitz, Austria; Tier IV event Clay (red) – $107,500 – 32S/32Q/16D; Singles – Doubles	(Switzerland) Patty Schnyder; 6–2, 4–6, 6–3	(Spain) Gala León García	(Switzerland) Emmanuelle Gagliardi (France) Amélie Cocheteux	(Austria) Sylvia Plischke (Austria) Barbara Schett (Austria) Barbara Paulus (Germany) Meike Babel
6 Jul	Piberstein Styria Open; Maria Lankowitz, Austria; Tier IV event Clay (red) – $107,500 – 32S/32Q/16D; Singles – Doubles	(Argentina) Laura Montalvo (Argentina) Paola Suárez; 6–1, 6–2	(Slovenia) Tina Križan (Slovenia) Katarina Srebotnik	(Switzerland) Emmanuelle Gagliardi (France) Amélie Cocheteux	(Austria) Sylvia Plischke (Austria) Barbara Schett (Austria) Barbara Paulus (Germany) Meike Babel
13 Jul	Warsaw Cup; Warsaw, Poland; Tier III event Clay (red) – $164,250 – 30S/32Q/16D; Singles – Doubles	(Spain) Conchita Martínez; 6–0, 6–3	(Italy) Silvia Farina	(Slovakia) Henrieta Nagyová (Poland) Magdalena Grzybowska	(Slovakia) Karina Habšudová (Romania) Cătălina Cristea (Germany) Andrea Glass (South Africa) Joannette Kruger
13 Jul	Warsaw Cup; Warsaw, Poland; Tier III event Clay (red) – $164,250 – 30S/32Q/16D; Singles – Doubles	(Slovakia) Karina Habšudová (Ukraine) Olga Lugina; 7–6^{(7–2)}, 7–5	(South Africa) Liezel Horn (Austria) Karin Kschwendt	(Slovakia) Henrieta Nagyová (Poland) Magdalena Grzybowska	(Slovakia) Karina Habšudová (Romania) Cătălina Cristea (Germany) Andrea Glass (South Africa) Joannette Kruger
13 Jul	XI Internazionali Femminili di Tennis; Palermo, Italy; Tier IV event Clay (red) – $107,500 – 32S/32Q/16D; Singles – Doubles	(Switzerland) Patty Schnyder; 6–1, 5–7, 6–2	(Austria) Barbara Schett	(Netherlands) Miriam Oremans (Germany) Barbara Rittner	(Italy) Maria Paola Zavagli (Bulgaria) Elena Pampoulova (Czech Republic) Radka Bobková (United States) Jennifer Capriati
13 Jul	XI Internazionali Femminili di Tennis; Palermo, Italy; Tier IV event Clay (red) – $107,500 – 32S/32Q/16D; Singles – Doubles	(Bulgaria) Pavlina Nola (Bulgaria) Elena Pampoulova; 6–4, 6–2	(Austria) Barbara Schett (Switzerland) Patty Schnyder	(Netherlands) Miriam Oremans (Germany) Barbara Rittner	(Italy) Maria Paola Zavagli (Bulgaria) Elena Pampoulova (Czech Republic) Radka Bobková (United States) Jennifer Capriati
20 July	Fed Cup: Semifinals; Sion, Switzerland – clay (red); Madrid, Spain – clay (red)	Semifinal Winners; Switzerland 5–0; Spain 3–2	Semifinal Losers; France; United States		
27 Jul	Bank of the West Classic; Stanford, United States; Tier II event Hard – $450,000 – 28S/32Q/16D; Singles – Doubles	(United States) Lindsay Davenport; 6–4, 5–7, 6–4	(United States) Venus Williams	(Germany) Steffi Graf (United States) Monica Seles	(Thailand) Tamarine Tanasugarn (Belarus) Natasha Zvereva (Russia) Elena Likhovtseva (France) Anne-Gaëlle Sidot
27 Jul	Bank of the West Classic; Stanford, United States; Tier II event Hard – $450,000 – 28S/32Q/16D; Singles – Doubles	(United States) Lindsay Davenport (Belarus) Natasha Zvereva; 6–4, 6–4	(Latvia) Larisa Savchenko (Ukraine) Elena Tatarkova	(Germany) Steffi Graf (United States) Monica Seles	(Thailand) Tamarine Tanasugarn (Belarus) Natasha Zvereva (Russia) Elena Likhovtseva (France) Anne-Gaëlle Sidot
27 Jul	Prokom Polish Open; Sopot, Poland; Tier IV event Clay (red) – $107,500 – 32S/32Q/16D; Singles – Doubles	(Slovakia) Henrieta Nagyová; 6–3, 5–7, 6–1	(Bulgaria) Elena Pampoulova	(Spain) Gala León García (Israel) Anna Smashnova	(Spain) Cristina Torrens Valero (Germany) Barbara Rittner (Czech Republic) Květa Hrdličková (Germany) Marlene Weingärtner
27 Jul	Prokom Polish Open; Sopot, Poland; Tier IV event Clay (red) – $107,500 – 32S/32Q/16D; Singles – Doubles	(Czech Republic) Květa Hrdličková (Czech Republic) Helena Vildová; 6–3, 6–2	(Sweden) Åsa Carlsson (Netherlands) Seda Noorlander	(Spain) Gala León García (Israel) Anna Smashnova	(Spain) Cristina Torrens Valero (Germany) Barbara Rittner (Czech Republic) Květa Hrdličková (Germany) Marlene Weingärtner

=== August ===
Week	Tournament	Champions	Runners-up	Semifinalists	Quarterfinalists
3 Aug	Toshiba Classic; San Diego, United States; Tier II event Hard – $450,000 – 28S/32Q/16D; Singles – Doubles	(United States) Lindsay Davenport; 6–3, 6–1	(France) Mary Pierce	(Switzerland) Martina Hingis (United States) Monica Seles	(South Africa) Joannette Kruger (United States) Venus Williams (Japan) Ai Sugiyama (France) Nathalie Tauziat
3 Aug	Toshiba Classic; San Diego, United States; Tier II event Hard – $450,000 – 28S/32Q/16D; Singles – Doubles	(United States) Lindsay Davenport (Belarus) Natasha Zvereva; 6–2, 6–1	(France) Alexandra Fusai (France) Nathalie Tauziat	(Switzerland) Martina Hingis (United States) Monica Seles	(South Africa) Joannette Kruger (United States) Venus Williams (Japan) Ai Sugiyama (France) Nathalie Tauziat
3 Aug	ENKA Ladies Open; Istanbul, Turkey; Tier IV event Hard – $107,500 – 32S/32Q/16D; Singles – Doubles	(Slovakia) Henrieta Nagyová; 6–4, 3–6, 7–6^{(11–9)}	(Belarus) Olga Barabanschikova	(Argentina) Florencia Labat (Italy) Laura Golarsa	(United States) Meghann Shaughnessy (Japan) Haruka Inoue (Italy) Francesca Lubiani (Israel) Anna Smashnova
3 Aug	ENKA Ladies Open; Istanbul, Turkey; Tier IV event Hard – $107,500 – 32S/32Q/16D; Singles – Doubles	(Germany) Meike Babel (Belgium) Laurence Courtois; 6–0, 6–2	(Sweden) Åsa Carlsson (Argentina) Florencia Labat	(Argentina) Florencia Labat (Italy) Laura Golarsa	(United States) Meghann Shaughnessy (Japan) Haruka Inoue (Italy) Francesca Lubiani (Israel) Anna Smashnova
10 Aug	Acura Classic; Manhattan Beach, United States; Tier II event Hard – $450,000 – 28S/32Q/16D; Singles – Doubles	(United States) Lindsay Davenport; 4–6, 6–4, 6–3	(Switzerland) Martina Hingis	(Spain) Arantxa Sánchez Vicario (United States) Monica Seles	(United States) Serena Williams (Ukraine) Elena Tatarkova (France) Nathalie Tauziat (Belarus) Natasha Zvereva
10 Aug	Acura Classic; Manhattan Beach, United States; Tier II event Hard – $450,000 – 28S/32Q/16D; Singles – Doubles	(Switzerland) Martina Hingis (Belarus) Natasha Zvereva; 6–4, 6–2	(Thailand) Tamarine Tanasugarn (Ukraine) Elena Tatarkova	(Spain) Arantxa Sánchez Vicario (United States) Monica Seles	(United States) Serena Williams (Ukraine) Elena Tatarkova (France) Nathalie Tauziat (Belarus) Natasha Zvereva
10 Aug	Boston Cup; Boston, United States; Tier III event Hard – $164,250 – 30S/32Q/16D; Singles – Doubles	(South Africa) Mariaan de Swardt; 3–6, 7–6^{(7–4)}, 7–5	(Austria) Barbara Schett	(Zimbabwe) Cara Black (United States) Lisa Raymond	(South Africa) Amanda Coetzer (Russia) Elena Likhovtseva (United States) Corina Morariu (Germany) Anke Huber
10 Aug	Boston Cup; Boston, United States; Tier III event Hard – $164,250 – 30S/32Q/16D; Singles – Doubles	(United States) Lisa Raymond (Australia) Rennae Stubbs; 6–4, 6–4	(South Africa) Mariaan de Swardt (United States) Mary Joe Fernández	(Zimbabwe) Cara Black (United States) Lisa Raymond	(South Africa) Amanda Coetzer (Russia) Elena Likhovtseva (United States) Corina Morariu (Germany) Anke Huber
17 Aug	du Maurier Open; Montreal, Canada; Tier I event Hard – $926,250 – 56S/32Q/28D; Singles – Doubles	(United States) Monica Seles; 6–3, 6–2	(Spain) Arantxa Sánchez Vicario	(Switzerland) Martina Hingis (Czech Republic) Jana Novotná	(France) Sandrine Testud (Germany) Anke Huber (Spain) Conchita Martínez (Spain) Magüi Serna
17 Aug	du Maurier Open; Montreal, Canada; Tier I event Hard – $926,250 – 56S/32Q/28D; Singles – Doubles	(Switzerland) Martina Hingis (Czech Republic) Jana Novotná; 6–3, 6–4	(Indonesia) Yayuk Basuki (Netherlands) Caroline Vis	(Switzerland) Martina Hingis (Czech Republic) Jana Novotná	(France) Sandrine Testud (Germany) Anke Huber (Spain) Conchita Martínez (Spain) Magüi Serna
24 Aug	Pilot Pen International; New Haven, United States; Tier II event Hard – $450,000 – 28S/32Q/16D; Singles – Doubles	(Germany) Steffi Graf; 6–4, 6–1	(Czech Republic) Jana Novotná	(United States) Lindsay Davenport (France) Julie Halard-Decugis	(Germany) Anke Huber (South Africa) Amanda Coetzer (United States) Mary Joe Fernández (France) Amélie Mauresmo
24 Aug	Pilot Pen International; New Haven, United States; Tier II event Hard – $450,000 – 28S/32Q/16D; Singles – Doubles	(France) Alexandra Fusai (France) Nathalie Tauziat; 6–1, 6–0	(South Africa) Mariaan de Swardt (Czech Republic) Jana Novotná	(United States) Lindsay Davenport (France) Julie Halard-Decugis	(Germany) Anke Huber (South Africa) Amanda Coetzer (United States) Mary Joe Fernández (France) Amélie Mauresmo
31 Aug; 7 Sep	U.S. Open; New York City, United States; Grand Slam; Hard – $6,012,000 – 128S/128QS/64D/16QD/32X; Singles – Doubles – Mixed doubles	(United States) Lindsay Davenport; 6–3, 7–5	(Switzerland) Martina Hingis	(Czech Republic) Jana Novotná (United States) Venus Williams	(United States) Monica Seles (Switzerland) Patty Schnyder (Spain) Arantxa Sánchez Vicario (South Africa) Amanda Coetzer
31 Aug; 7 Sep	U.S. Open; New York City, United States; Grand Slam; Hard – $6,012,000 – 128S/128QS/64D/16QD/32X; Singles – Doubles – Mixed doubles	(Switzerland) Martina Hingis (Czech Republic) Jana Novotná; 6–3, 6–3	(United States) Lindsay Davenport (Belarus) Natasha Zvereva	(Czech Republic) Jana Novotná (United States) Venus Williams	(United States) Monica Seles (Switzerland) Patty Schnyder (Spain) Arantxa Sánchez Vicario (South Africa) Amanda Coetzer
31 Aug; 7 Sep	U.S. Open; New York City, United States; Grand Slam; Hard – $6,012,000 – 128S/128QS/64D/16QD/32X; Singles – Doubles – Mixed doubles	(Belarus) Max Mirnyi (United States) Serena Williams; 6–2, 6–2	(United States) Patrick Galbraith (United States) Lisa Raymond	(Czech Republic) Jana Novotná (United States) Venus Williams	(United States) Monica Seles (Switzerland) Patty Schnyder (Spain) Arantxa Sánchez Vicario (South Africa) Amanda Coetzer

=== September ===
Week	Tournament	Champions	Runners-up	Semifinalists	Quarterfinalists
14 Sep	Fed Cup: Final; Geneva, Switzerland – hard (i)	Spain; 3–2	Switzerland		
21 Sep	Toyota Princess Cup; Tokyo, Japan; Tier II event Hard – $450,000 – 28S/32Q/16D; Singles – Doubles	(United States) Monica Seles; 4–6, 6–3, 6–4	(Spain) Arantxa Sánchez Vicario	(Germany) Anke Huber (Thailand) Tamarine Tanasugarn	(Russia) Anna Kournikova (Belarus) Olga Barabanschikova (United States) Amy Frazier (France) Julie Halard-Decugis
21 Sep	Toyota Princess Cup; Tokyo, Japan; Tier II event Hard – $450,000 – 28S/32Q/16D; Singles – Doubles	(Russia) Anna Kournikova (United States) Monica Seles; 6–4, 6–4	(United States) Mary Joe Fernández (Spain) Arantxa Sánchez Vicario	(Germany) Anke Huber (Thailand) Tamarine Tanasugarn	(Russia) Anna Kournikova (Belarus) Olga Barabanschikova (United States) Amy Frazier (France) Julie Halard-Decugis
28 Sep	Compaq Grand Slam Cup; Munich, Germany; Year-end championships Hard (i) – $2,450,000 – 8S; Singles	(United States) Venus Williams; 6–2, 3–6, 6–2	(Switzerland) Patty Schnyder	(Switzerland) Martina Hingis (France) Nathalie Tauziat	(Spain) Conchita Martínez (Czech Republic) Jana Novotná (Spain) Arantxa Sánchez Vicario (United States) Lindsay Davenport

=== October ===
Week	Tournament	Champions	Runners-up	Semifinalists	Quarterfinalists
5 Oct	Porsche Tennis Grand Prix; Filderstadt, Germany; Tier II event Hard (i) – $450,000 – 28S/32Q/16D; Singles – Doubles	(France) Sandrine Testud; 7–5, 6–3	(United States) Lindsay Davenport	(Belgium) Dominique Van Roost (Spain) Arantxa Sánchez Vicario	(Switzerland) Martina Hingis (United States) Serena Williams (United States) Lisa Raymond (France) Nathalie Tauziat
5 Oct	Porsche Tennis Grand Prix; Filderstadt, Germany; Tier II event Hard (i) – $450,000 – 28S/32Q/16D; Singles – Doubles	(United States) Lindsay Davenport (Belarus) Natasha Zvereva; 6–4, 6–2	(Russia) Anna Kournikova (Spain) Arantxa Sánchez Vicario	(Belgium) Dominique Van Roost (Spain) Arantxa Sánchez Vicario	(Switzerland) Martina Hingis (United States) Serena Williams (United States) Lisa Raymond (France) Nathalie Tauziat
12 Oct	European Championships; Zürich, Switzerland; Tier I event Hard – $926,250 – 28S/32Q/16D; Singles – Doubles	(United States) Lindsay Davenport; 7–5, 6–3	(United States) Venus Williams	(Romania) Irina Spîrlea (France) Nathalie Tauziat	(South Africa) Amanda Coetzer (Belgium) Dominique Van Roost (Austria) Barbara Schett (France) Mary Pierce
12 Oct	European Championships; Zürich, Switzerland; Tier I event Hard – $926,250 – 28S/32Q/16D; Singles – Doubles	(United States) Serena Williams (United States) Venus Williams; 5–7, 6–1, 6–3	(South Africa) Mariaan de Swardt (Ukraine) Elena Tatarkova	(Romania) Irina Spîrlea (France) Nathalie Tauziat	(South Africa) Amanda Coetzer (Belgium) Dominique Van Roost (Austria) Barbara Schett (France) Mary Pierce
19 Oct	MGTS Kremlin Cup; Moscow, Russia; Tier I event Carpet (i) – $1,000,000 – 28S/32Q/16D; Singles – Doubles	(France) Mary Pierce; 7–6^{(7–2)}, 6–3	(United States) Monica Seles	(United States) Venus Williams (France) Sandrine Testud	(Slovakia) Katarína Studeníková (Spain) Magüi Serna (Spain) Conchita Martínez (Italy) Silvia Farina
19 Oct	MGTS Kremlin Cup; Moscow, Russia; Tier I event Carpet (i) – $1,000,000 – 28S/32Q/16D; Singles – Doubles	(France) Mary Pierce (Belarus) Natasha Zvereva; 6–3, 6–4	(United States) Lisa Raymond (Australia) Rennae Stubbs	(United States) Venus Williams (France) Sandrine Testud	(Slovakia) Katarína Studeníková (Spain) Magüi Serna (Spain) Conchita Martínez (Italy) Silvia Farina
26 Oct	SEAT Open; Kockelscheuer, Luxembourg; Tier III event Carpet (i) – $164,250 – 30S/32Q/16D; Singles – Doubles	(France) Mary Pierce; 6–0, 2–0 ret.	(Italy) Silvia Farina	(France) Nathalie Tauziat (Russia) Elena Likhovtseva	(Germany) Anke Huber (Romania) Irina Spîrlea (Russia) Evgenia Kulikovskaya (Japan) Ai Sugiyama
26 Oct	SEAT Open; Kockelscheuer, Luxembourg; Tier III event Carpet (i) – $164,250 – 30S/32Q/16D; Singles – Doubles	(Russia) Elena Likhovtseva (Japan) Ai Sugiyama; 6–7^{(3–7)}, 6–3, 2–0 ret.	(Latvia) Larisa Savchenko (Ukraine) Elena Tatarkova	(France) Nathalie Tauziat (Russia) Elena Likhovtseva	(Germany) Anke Huber (Romania) Irina Spîrlea (Russia) Evgenia Kulikovskaya (Japan) Ai Sugiyama
26 Oct	Bell Challenge; Quebec City, Canada; Tier III event Carpet (i) – $164,250 – 28S/32Q/16D; Singles – Doubles	(United States) Tara Snyder; 4–6, 6–4, 7–6^{(8–6)}	(United States) Chanda Rubin	(France) Nathalie Dechy (United States) Jane Chi	(Belgium) Dominique Van Roost (United States) Alexandra Stevenson (Romania) Cătălina Cristea (France) Sandrine Testud
26 Oct	Bell Challenge; Quebec City, Canada; Tier III event Carpet (i) – $164,250 – 28S/32Q/16D; Singles – Doubles	(United States) Lori McNeil (United States) Kimberly Po; 6–7^{(3–7)}, 7–5, 6–4	(United States) Chanda Rubin (France) Sandrine Testud	(France) Nathalie Dechy (United States) Jane Chi	(Belgium) Dominique Van Roost (United States) Alexandra Stevenson (Romania) Cătălina Cristea (France) Sandrine Testud

=== November ===
Week	Tournament	Champions	Runners-up	Semifinalists	Quarterfinalists
2 Nov	Sparkassen Cup International; Leipzig, Germany; Tier II event Carpet (i) – $450,000 – 28S/32Q/16D; Singles – Doubles	(Germany) Steffi Graf; 6–3, 6–4	(France) Nathalie Tauziat	(Belgium) Dominique Van Roost (Romania) Irina Spîrlea	(France) Anne-Gaëlle Sidot (Belarus) Natasha Zvereva (France) Sarah Pitkowski (Germany) Anke Huber
2 Nov	Sparkassen Cup International; Leipzig, Germany; Tier II event Carpet (i) – $450,000 – 28S/32Q/16D; Singles – Doubles	(Russia) Elena Likhovtseva (Japan) Ai Sugiyama; 6–3, 6–7^{(2–7)}, 6–1	(Netherlands) Manon Bollegraf (Romania) Irina Spîrlea	(Belgium) Dominique Van Roost (Romania) Irina Spîrlea	(France) Anne-Gaëlle Sidot (Belarus) Natasha Zvereva (France) Sarah Pitkowski (Germany) Anke Huber
9 Nov	Advanta Championships; Philadelphia, United States; Tier II event Carpet (i) – $450,000 – 28S/32Q/16D; Singles – Doubles	(Germany) Steffi Graf; 4–6, 6–3, 6–4	(United States) Lindsay Davenport	(United States) Monica Seles (France) Nathalie Tauziat	(United States) Amy Frazier (Belarus) Natasha Zvereva (South Africa) Amanda Coetzer (Switzerland) Martina Hingis
9 Nov	Advanta Championships; Philadelphia, United States; Tier II event Carpet (i) – $450,000 – 28S/32Q/16D; Singles – Doubles	(Russia) Elena Likhovtseva (Japan) Ai Sugiyama; 7–5, 4–6, 6–2	(United States) Monica Seles (Belarus) Natasha Zvereva	(United States) Monica Seles (France) Nathalie Tauziat	(United States) Amy Frazier (Belarus) Natasha Zvereva (South Africa) Amanda Coetzer (Switzerland) Martina Hingis
16 Nov	Chase Championships; New York City, United States; Year-end championships Carpet (i) – $2,000,000 – 16S/8D; Single Draw – Doubles	(Switzerland) Martina Hingis; 7–5, 6–4, 4–6, 6–2	(United States) Lindsay Davenport	(Germany) Steffi Graf (Romania) Irina Spîrlea	(France) Nathalie Tauziat (United States) Monica Seles (Belgium) Dominique Van Roost (France) Mary Pierce
16 Nov	Chase Championships; New York City, United States; Year-end championships Carpet (i) – $2,000,000 – 16S/8D; Single Draw – Doubles	(United States) Lindsay Davenport (Belarus) Natasha Zvereva; 6–7^{(6–8)}, 7–5, 6–3	(France) Alexandra Fusai (France) Nathalie Tauziat	(Germany) Steffi Graf (Romania) Irina Spîrlea	(France) Nathalie Tauziat (United States) Monica Seles (Belgium) Dominique Van Roost (France) Mary Pierce
16 Nov	Volvo Women's Open; Pattaya, Thailand; Tier IV event Hard – $107,500 – 32S/32Q/16D; Single Draw – Doubles	(France) Julie Halard-Decugis; 6–1, 6–2	(China) Li Fang	(Croatia) Silvija Talaja (United States) Kristina Brandi	(Belarus) Olga Barabanschikova (Thailand) Tamarine Tanasugarn (United States) Meilen Tu (Chinese Taipei) Wang Shi-ting
16 Nov	Volvo Women's Open; Pattaya, Thailand; Tier IV event Hard – $107,500 – 32S/32Q/16D; Single Draw – Doubles	(Belgium) Els Callens (France) Julie Halard-Decugis; 3–6, 6–2, 6–2	(Japan) Rika Hiraki (Poland) Aleksandra Olsza	(Croatia) Silvija Talaja (United States) Kristina Brandi	(Belarus) Olga Barabanschikova (Thailand) Tamarine Tanasugarn (United States) Meilen Tu (Chinese Taipei) Wang Shi-ting

== Statistical information ==
List of players and titles won, last name alphabetically:

- (United States) Lindsay Davenport – Tokyo (Tier I), Stanford, San Diego, Los Angeles, US Open, Zurich (6)
- (Switzerland) Martina Hingis – Australian Open, Indian Wells, Hamburg, Rome, WTA Championships (5)
- (Switzerland) Patty Schnyder – Hobart, Hanover, Madrid, Maria Lankowitz, Palermo (5)
- (Czech Republic) Jana Novotná – Linz, Eastbourne, Wimbledon, Prague (4)
- (France) Mary Pierce – Paris, Amelia Island, Moscow, Luxembourg (4)
- (Germany) Steffi Graf – New Haven, Leipzig, Philadelphia (3)
- (United States) Venus Williams – Oklahoma City, Miami and Grand Slam Cup (3)
- (France) Julie Halard-Decugis – 's-Hertogenbosch and Pattaya City (2)
- (Spain) Conchita Martínez – Berlin, Warsaw (2)
- (Slovakia) Henrieta Nagyová – Sopot, Istanbul (2)
- (Spain) Arantxa Sánchez Vicario – Sydney, French Open (2)
- (United States) Monica Seles – Montreal, Tokyo (Tier II) (2)
- (Japan) Ai Sugiyama – Gold Coast, Tokyo (Tier III) (2)
- (South Africa) Amanda Coetzer – Hilton Head (1)
- (South Africa) Mariaan de Swardt – Boston (1)
- (Czech Republic) Květa Hrdličková – Makarska (1)
- (Croatia) Mirjana Lučić – Bol (1)
- (Spain) Virginia Ruano Pascual – Budapest (1)
- (United States) Tara Snyder – Quebec City (1)
- (Romania) Irina Spîrlea – Strasbourg (1)
- (Argentina) Paola Suárez – Bogotá (1)
- (France) Sandrine Testud – Filderstadt (1)
- (Belgium) Dominique Van Roost – Auckland (1)

The following players won their first title:

- (Switzerland) Patty Schnyder
- (Argentina) Paola Suárez
- (United States) Venus Williams
- (Czech Republic) Květa Hrdličková
- (South Africa) Mariaan de Swardt
- (United States) Tara Snyder

List of titles won by country:

- United States – 12 – Tokyo (Tier I), Oklahoma City, Miami, Stanford, San Diego, Los Angeles, Montreal, US Open, Tokyo (Tier II), Grand Slam Cup, Zurich, Quebec City
- Switzerland – 10 – Hobart, Australian Open, Hanover, Indian Wells, Hamburg, Rome, Madrid, Maria Lankowitz, Palermo, WTA Championships
- France – 7 – Paris, Amelia Island, 's-Hertogenbosch, Filderstadt, Moscow, Luxembourg, Pattaya City
- Czech Republic – 5 – Linz, Makarska, Eastbourne, Wimbledon, Prague
- Spain – 5 – Sydney, Budapest, Berlin, French Open, Warsaw
- Germany – 3 – New Haven, Leipzig, Philadelphia
- Japan – 2 – Gold Coast, Tokyo (Tier III)
- South Africa – 2 – Hilton Head, Boston
- Slovakia – 1 – Sopot, Istanbul
- Argentina – 1 – Bogotá
- Belgium – 1 – Auckland
- Croatia – 1 – Bol
- Romania – 1 – Strasbourg

== Rankings ==
Below are the 1998 WTA year-end rankings in both singles and doubles competition:

Singles Year-end Ranking
No	Player Name	Points	1997	Change
1	Lindsay Davenport (USA)	5,654	3	+2
2	Martina Hingis (SUI)	5,366	1	-1
3	Jana Novotná (CZE)	3,734	2	-1
4	Arantxa Sánchez Vicario (ESP)	3,417	9	+5
5	Venus Williams (USA)	3,262	22	+17
6	Monica Seles (USA)	3,226	5	-1
7	Mary Pierce (FRA)	2,414	7	=
8	Conchita Martínez (ESP)	2,331	12	+4
9	Steffi Graf (GER)	2,261	28	+19
10	Nathalie Tauziat (FRA)	2,259	11	+1
11	Patty Schnyder (SUI)	2,256	26	+15
12	Dominique Van Roost (BEL)	2,073	18	+6
13	Anna Kournikova (RUS)	1,971	32	+19
14	Sandrine Testud (FRA)	1,898	13	-1
15	Irina Spîrlea (ROM)	1,830	8	-7
16	Natasha Zvereva (BLR)	1,770	25	+9
17	Amanda Coetzer (RSA)	1,752	4	-13
18	Ai Sugiyama (JPN)	1,398	20	+2
19	Silvia Farina (ITA)	1,389	43	+24
20	Serena Williams (USA)	1,301	99	+79

Doubles Year-end Ranking
No	Player Name	Points	1997	Change
1	Natasha Zvereva (BLR)	4,994	1	=
2	Martina Hingis (SUI)	4,816	3	+1
3	Jana Novotná (CZE)	4,022	6	+3
4	Lindsay Davenport (USA)	3,945	2	-2
5	Rennae Stubbs (AUS)	2,617	34	+29
5	Lisa Raymond (USA)	2,617	12	+7
7	Nathalie Tauziat (FRA)	2,386	13	+6
8	Alexandra Fusai (FRA)	2,386	14	+6
9	Elena Likhovtseva (RUS)	2,101	24	+15
10	Anna Kournikova (RUS)	2,067	40	+30
11	Larisa Neiland (LAT)	2,010	9	-2
12	Arantxa Sánchez Vicario (ESP)	1,925	5	-7
13	Ai Sugiyama (JPN)	1,857	25	+12
14	Patricia Tarabini (ARG)	1,773	17	+3
15	Caroline Vis (NED)	1,687	11	-4
16	Conchita Martínez (ESP)	1,605	19	+3
17	Mariaan de Swardt (RSA)	1,525	63	+46
18	Manon Bollegraf (NED)	1,480	7	-11
19	Yayuk Basuki (INA)	1,444	15	-4
20	Mirjana Lučić (CRO)	1,405	NR	N/A

== See also ==
- 1998 ATP Tour
