= 1998 Boston Cup =

- Date: August 10–16
- Edition: Only
- Category: Tier III
- Draw: 30S / 16D
- Prize money: $164,250
- Surface: Hard / outdoor
- Location: Chestnut Hill, MA, U.S.
- Venue: Longwood Cricket Club

Champions

Singles
- (South Africa) Mariaan de Swardt

Doubles
- (United States) Lisa Raymond / (Australia) Rennae Stubbs
- Boston Cup

The 1998 Boston Cup was a tennis tournament played on outdoor hard courts at the Longwood Cricket Club in Chestnut Hill, Massachusetts in the United States that was part of Tier III of the 1998 WTA Tour. It was the only edition of the tournament and was held from August 10 through August 16, 1998. Unseeded Mariaan de Swardt won the singles title and earned $27,000 first-prize money.

== Finals ==
=== Singles ===
(South Africa) Mariaan de Swardt defeated (Austria) Barbara Schett 3–6, 7–6, 7–5

- It was de Swardt's 2nd title of the year and the 4th of her career.

=== Doubles ===
(United States) Lisa Raymond / (Australia) Rennae Stubbs defeated (South Africa) Mariaan de Swardt / (United States) Mary Joe Fernández 6–4, 6–4

- It was Raymond's 2nd title of the year and the 11th of her career. It was Stubbs' 2nd title of the year and the 15th of her career.
