= 1998 Swisscom Challenge =

- Date: October 12–18
- Edition: 15th
- Category: Tier I
- Surface: Hard / indoor
- Location: Zürich, Switzerland
- Venue: Schluefweg

Champions

Singles
- (United States) Lindsay Davenport

Doubles
- (United States) Serena Williams / (United States) Venus Williams
← 1997 ·	Swisscom Challenge	· 1999 →

The 1998 Swisscom Challenge was a women's tennis tournament played on indoor hard courts at the Schluefweg in Zürich, Switzerland that was part of Tier I of the 1998 WTA Tour. It was the 15th edition of the tournament and was held from October 12 through October 18, 1998.

== Finals ==
=== Singles ===
(United States) Lindsay Davenport defeated (United States) Venus Williams 7–5, 6–3

- It was Davenport's 6th title of the year and the 19th of her career.

=== Doubles ===
(United States) Serena Williams / (United States) Venus Williams defeated (South Africa) Mariaan de Swardt / (Ukraine) Elena Tatarkova 5–7, 6–1, 6–3

- It was Serena Williams' 4th title of the year and the 4th of her career. It was Venus Williams' 7th title of the year and the 7th of her career.
