= 1998 Boston Cup – Singles =

Singles
- 1998 Boston Cup

Final
- Champion: (South Africa) Mariaan de Swardt
- Runner-up: (Austria) Barbara Schett
- Score: 3–6, 7–6^{(7–4)}, 7–5

Details
- Draw: 30 (3WC/4Q/1LL)
- Seeds: 8

Events
Singles	Doubles
- Boston Cup

Mariaan de Swardt won in the final 3–6, 7–6^{(7–4)}, 7–5 against Barbara Schett.

== Seeds ==
A champion seed is indicated in bold text while text in italics indicates the round in which that seed was eliminated. The top two seeds received a bye to the second round.

1. (South Africa) Amanda Coetzer (quarterfinals)
2. (Germany) Anke Huber (quarterfinals)
3. (United States) Lisa Raymond (semifinals)
4. (Italy) Silvia Farina (second round)
5. (Russia) Elena Likhovtseva (quarterfinals)
6. (South Africa) ~~Joannette Kruger~~ (withdrew)
7. (Austria) Barbara Schett (final)
8. (United States) Corina Morariu (quarterfinals)

== Draw ==
Key

- Q = Qualifier
- WC = Wild card
- LL = Lucky loser
- Alt = Alternate
- ITF = ITF entry
- PR = Protected ranking
- SR = Special ranking
- SE = Special exempt
- JE = Junior exempt
- JR = Junior Accelerator Programme entrant
- CO = College Accelerator Programme entrant
- NG = Next Gen Accelerator Program entrant
- w/o = Walkover
- r = Retired
- d = Defaulted

=== Final ===
Final
7	(Austria) Barbara Schett	**6**	6^{4}	5
	(South Africa) **Mariaan de Swardt**	3	**7^{7}**	**7**

=== Top half ===
First round
(Australia) R McQuillan	4	2
Q	(Japan) **N Miyagi**	**6**	**6**
Q	(South Africa) L Horn	4	1
(Romania) **C Cristea**	**6**	**6**
Q	(Puerto Rico) K Brandi	4	0
7	(Austria) **B Schett**	**6**	**6**
4	(Italy) **S Farina**	1	**6**	**7**
(United States) M J Fernández	**6**	2	5
(Austria) S Plischke	6^{5}	**6**	1
(Zimbabwe) **C Black**	**7^{7}**	3	**6**
(Chinese Taipei) **S-T Wang**	**6**	**6**
(Czech Republic) S Kleinová	0	0
(Germany) A Glass	1	2	r
5	(Russia) **E Likhovtseva**	**6**	**4**

Second round
1	(South Africa) **A Coetzer**	**6**	**6**
Q	(Japan) N Miyagi	3	3
(Romania) C Cristea	0	5
7	(Austria) **B Schett**	**6**	**7**
4	(Italy) S Farina	**6**	4	2
(Zimbabwe) **C Black**	4	**6**	**6**
(Chinese Taipei) S-T Wang	4	2
5	(Russia) **E Likhovtseva**	**6**	**6**

Quarterfinals
1	(South Africa) A Coetzer	**7^{7}**	4	1
7	(Austria) **B Schett**	6^{3}	**6**	**6**
(Zimbabwe) **C Black**	1	**6**	**6**
5	(Russia) E Likhovtseva	**6**	1	2

Semifinals
7	(Austria) **B Schett**	**6**	2	**6**
(Zimbabwe) C Black	2	**6**	2

=== Bottom half ===
First round
8	(United States) **C Morariu**	**6**	**6**
(Japan) M Saeki	1	2
WC	(United States) **M Shaughnessy**	**6**	**6**
Q	(Australia) N Pratt	2	0
WC	(Romania) **R Dragomir**	**6**	**6**
(Russia) T Panova	1	1
(United States) A Frazier	4	2
3	(United States) **L Raymond**	**6**	**6**
LL	(Japan) Y Yoshida	2	4
(France) **N Dechy**	**6**	**6**
(United Kingdom) S Smith	**6**	3	2
(South Africa) **M de Swardt**	2	**6**	**6**
(Belarus) **O Barabanschikova**	**6**	**6**
WC	(United States) E deLone	1	2

Second round
8	(United States) **C Morariu**	3	**6**	**6**
WC	(United States) M Shaughnessy	**6**	1	2
WC	(Romania) R Dragomir	3	3
3	(United States) **L Raymond**	**6**	**6**
(France) N Dechy	1	6^{1}
(South Africa) **M de Swardt**	**6**	**7^{7}**
(Belarus) O Barabanschikova
2	(Germany) **A Huber**	w/o

Quarterfinals
8	(United States) C Morariu	6^{5}	2
3	(United States) **L Raymond**	**7^{7}**	**6**
(South Africa) **M de Swardt**	**6**	**7^{7}**
2	(Germany) A Huber	3	6^{4}

Semifinals
3	(United States) L Raymond	**6**	4	5
(South Africa) **M de Swardt**	4	**6**	**7**
