= 1998 Boston Cup – Doubles =

Doubles
- 1998 Boston Cup

Final
- Champions: (United States) Lisa Raymond (Australia) Rennae Stubbs
- Runners-up: (South Africa) Mariaan de Swardt (United States) Mary Joe Fernández
- Score: 6–4, 6–4

Events
Singles	Doubles
- Boston Cup

Lisa Raymond and Rennae Stubbs won in the final 6–4, 6–4 against Mariaan de Swardt and Mary Joe Fernández.

== Seeds ==
Champion seeds are indicated in bold text while text in italics indicates the round in which those seeds were eliminated.

1. (United States) **Lisa Raymond** / (Australia) **Rennae Stubbs (champions)**
2. (Japan) Naoko Kijimuta / (Japan) Nana Miyagi (first round)
3. (South Africa) Amanda Coetzer / (Austria) Barbara Schett (first round)
4. (Australia) Kristine Kunce / (United States) Corina Morariu (first round)

== Draw ==
Key

- Q = Qualifier
- WC = Wild card
- LL = Lucky loser
- Alt = Alternate
- ITF = ITF entry
- PR = Protected ranking
- SR = Special ranking
- SE = Special exempt
- JE = Junior exempt
- JR = Junior Accelerator Programme entrant
- CO = College Accelerator Programme entrant
- NG = Next Gen Accelerator Program entrant
- w/o = Walkover
- r = Retired
- d = Defaulted

First round
1	(United States) **L Raymond** (Australia) **R Stubbs**	**6**	**6**
(United States) E deLone (Chinese Taipei) S-T Wang	3	1
(South Africa) N de Villiers (Australia) L McShea	**6**	1	4
(Italy) **S Farina** (Germany) **A Huber**	1	**6**	**6**
4	(Australia) K Kunce (United States) C Morariu	2	2
Q	(Zimbabwe) **C Black** (Kazakhstan) **I Selyutina**	**6**	**6**
(Australia) **A Ellwood** (Australia) **T Musgrave**	**w/o**
(Belarus) O Barabanschikova (Russia) E Likhovtseva
(South Africa) L Horn (Argentina) M Paz	4	3
(Australia) **R McQuillan** (Australia) **N Pratt**	**6**	**6**
(Romania) **C Cristea** (Romania) **R Dragomir**	1	**7**	**6**
3	(South Africa) A Coetzer (Austria) B Schett	**6**	6	2
(Germany) **K Freye** (Japan) **Y Yoshida**	**6**	**6**
WC	(Czech Republic) S Kleinová (United States) B Rippner	2	1
(South Africa) **M de Swardt** (United States) **M J Fernández**	**6**	**7**
2	(Japan) N Kijimuta (Japan) N Miyagi	1	6

Quarterfinals
1	(United States) **L Raymond** (Australia) **R Stubbs**	**6**	**6**
(Italy) S Farina (Germany) A Huber	4	3
Q	(Zimbabwe) **C Black** (Kazakhstan) **I Selyutina**	**6**	4	**6**
(Australia) A Ellwood (Australia) T Musgrave	2	**6**	2
(Australia) R McQuillan (Australia) N Pratt	3	3
(Romania) **C Cristea** (Romania) **R Dragomir**	**6**	**6**
(Germany) K Freye (Japan) Y Yoshida	3	3
(South Africa) **M de Swardt** (United States) **M J Fernández**	**6**	**6**

Semifinals
1	(United States) **L Raymond** (Australia) **R Stubbs**	**7**	**6**
Q	(Zimbabwe) C Black (Kazakhstan) I Selyutina	6	1
(Romania) C Cristea (Romania) R Dragomir	3	**7**	4
(South Africa) **M de Swardt** (United States) **M J Fernández**	**6**	5	**6**

Final
1	(United States) **Lisa Raymond** (Australia) **Rennae Stubbs**	**6**	**6**
(South Africa) Mariaan de Swardt (United States) Mary Joe Fernández	4	4
