= 1998 IGA Tennis Classic =

- Date: February 23 – March 1
- Edition: 13th
- Category: Tier III
- Draw: 30S / 16D
- Prize money: $164,250
- Surface: Hard / indoor
- Location: Oklahoma City, OK, U.S.

Champions

Singles
- (United States) Venus Williams

Doubles
- (United States) Serena Williams / (United States) Venus Williams
- IGA Tennis Classic

The 1998 IGA Tennis Classic was a women's tennis tournament played on indoor hard courts at The Greens Country Club in Oklahoma City, Oklahoma in the United States that was part of Tier III of the 1998 WTA Tour. It was the 13th edition of the tournament and was held from February 23 through March 1, 1998.

== Finals ==
=== Singles ===
(United States) Venus Williams defeated (South Africa) Joannette Kruger 6–3, 6–2

- It was Williams' first singles title of her career.

=== Doubles ===
(United States) Serena Williams / (United States) Venus Williams defeated (Romania) Cătălina Cristea / (Australia) Kristine Kunce 7–5, 6–2

- It was Serena Williams' 1st doubles title of her career. It was Venus Williams' 1st doubles title of her career.
