= 1998 IGA Tennis Classic – Doubles =

Doubles
- 1998 IGA Classic

Final
- Champions: (United States) Serena Williams (United States) Venus Williams
- Runners-up: (Romania) Cătălina Cristea (Australia) Kristine Kunce
- Score: 7–5, 6–2

Details
- Draw: 16
- Seeds: 4

Events
Singles	Doubles
- IGA Classic

Rika Hiraki and Nana Miyagi were the defending champions but they competed with different partners that year, Hiraki with Amy Frazier and Miyagi with Rachel McQuillan.

Frazier and Hiraki lost in the first round to Laura Golarsa and Liezel Horn.

McQuillan and Miyagi lost in the quarterfinals to Kristie Boogert and Julie Halard-Decugis.

Serena Williams and Venus Williams won in the final 7–5, 6–2 against Cătălina Cristea and Kristine Kunce.

== Seeds ==
Champion seeds are indicated in bold text while text in italics indicates the round in which those seeds were eliminated.

1. (United States) Katrina Adams / (United States) Debbie Graham (quarterfinals)
2. (Australia) Rachel McQuillan / (Japan) Nana Miyagi (quarterfinals)
3. (United States) Amy Frazier / (Japan) Rika Hiraki (first round)
4. (Australia) Catherine Barclay / (Australia) Kerry-Anne Guse (first round)

== Draw ==
Key

- Q = Qualifier
- WC = Wild card
- LL = Lucky loser
- Alt = Alternate
- ITF = ITF entry
- PR = Protected ranking
- SR = Special ranking
- SE = Special exempt
- JE = Junior exempt
- JR = Junior Accelerator Programme entrant
- CO = College Accelerator Programme entrant
- NG = Next Gen Accelerator Program entrant
- w/o = Walkover
- r = Retired
- d = Defaulted

First round
1	(United States) **K Adams** (United States) **D Graham**	**6**	**6**
(Japan) M Saeki (United States) A Wunderlich	2	2
Q	(South Africa) S de Beer (United States) L Lee	4	5
(United States) **S Williams** (United States) **V Williams**	**6**	**7**
3	(United States) A Frazier (Japan) R Hiraki	4	4
(Italy) **L Golarsa** (South Africa) **L Horn**	**6**	**6**
(Czech Republic) E Martincová (Poland) A Olsza	6	4
(South Africa) **N de Villiers** (United States) **G Helgeson-Nielsen**	**7**	**6**
(France) A Dechaume-Balleret (France) S Testud	3	4
(United States) **E deLone** (Australia) **N Pratt**	**6**	**6**
(Romania) **C Cristea** (Australia) **K Kunce**	**7**	**6**
4	(Australia) C Barclay (Australia) K-A Guse	5	1
(Netherlands) **K Boogert** (France) **J Halard-Decugis**	**6**	**7**
(South Africa) M de Swardt (United States) M McGrath	4	5
WC	(United States) L Davenport (United States) J Steven	3	2
2	(Australia) **R McQuillan** (Japan) **N Miyagi**	**6**	**6**

Quarterfinals
1	(United States) K Adams (United States) D Graham	4	3	r
(United States) **S Williams** (United States) **V Williams**	**6**	**4**
(Italy) **L Golarsa** (South Africa) **L Horn**	**6**	**7**
(South Africa) N de Villiers (United States) G Helgeson-Nielsen	3	5
(United States) E deLone (Australia) N Pratt	2	3
(Romania) **C Cristea** (Australia) **K Kunce**	**6**	**6**
(Netherlands) **K Boogert** (France) **J Halard-Decugis**	**6**	**6**
2	(Australia) R McQuillan (Japan) N Miyagi	4	1

Semifinals
(United States) **S Williams** (United States) **V Williams**	**6**	**6**
(Italy) L Golarsa (South Africa) L Horn	2	2
(Romania) **C Cristea** (Australia) **K Kunce**	**6**	**6**
(Netherlands) K Boogert (France) J Halard-Decugis	1	3

Final
(United States) **Serena Williams** (United States) **Venus Williams**	**7**	**6**
(Romania) Cătălina Cristea (Australia) Kristine Kunce	5	2
