= 1998 Skoda Czech Open =

- Date: 6–12 July
- Edition: 7th
- Category: Tier III
- Draw: 32S / 32Q / 16D
- Prize money: $160,000
- Surface: Clay / outdoor
- Location: Prague, Czech Republic
- Venue: I. Czech Lawn Tennis Club

Champions

Singles
- (Czech Republic) Jana Novotná

Doubles
- (Italy) Silvia Farina / (Slovakia) Karina Habšudová
- Skoda Czech Open

The 1998 Skoda Czech Open was a women's tennis tournament played on outdoor clay courts at the I. Czech Lawn Tennis Club in Prague in the Czech Republic that was part of Tier III of the 1998 WTA Tour. The tournament was held from 6 July through 12 July 1998. First-seeded Jana Novotná won the singles title.

== Finals ==
=== Singles ===
(Czech Republic) Jana Novotná defeated (France) Sandrine Testud 6–3, 6–0

- It was Novotná's 4th singles title of the year and the 23rd of her career.

=== Doubles ===
(Italy) Silvia Farina / (Slovakia) Karina Habšudová defeated (Czech Republic) Květa Hrdličková / (Czech Republic) Michaela Paštiková 2–6, 6–1, 6–1

- It was Farina's only title of the year and the 3rd of her career. It was Habšudová's 1st title of the year and the 3rd of her career.

== See also ==
- 1998 Paegas Czech Open – men's tournament
