= 1998 Acura Classic =

- Date: August 10–16
- Edition: 25th
- Category: Tier II
- Draw: 28S / 16D
- Prize money: $450,000
- Surface: Hard / outdoor
- Location: Manhattan Beach, California, U.S.
- Venue: Manhattan Country Club

Champions

Singles
- (United States) Lindsay Davenport

Doubles
- (Switzerland) Martina Hingis / (Belarus) Natasha Zvereva
- WTA Los Angeles

The 1998 Acura Classic was a women's tennis tournament played on outdoor hard courts at the Manhattan Country Club in Manhattan Beach, California in the United States that was part of Tier II of the 1998 WTA Tour. The tournament was held from August 10 through August 16, 1998. Second-seeded Lindsay Davenport won the singles title. The victory was Davenport's third consecutive WTA Tour title and extended her winning streak to 12 matches.

== Finals ==
=== Singles ===
(United States) Lindsay Davenport defeated (Switzerland) Martina Hingis 4–6, 6–4, 6–3

- It was Davenport's 4th title of the year and the 17th of her career.

=== Doubles ===
(Switzerland) Martina Hingis / (Belarus) Natasha Zvereva defeated (Thailand) Tamarine Tanasugarn / (Ukraine) Elena Tatarkova 6–4, 6–2

- It was Hingis' 11th title of the year and the 36th of her career. It was Zvereva's 5th title of the year and the 78th of her career.
