= 1998 IGA Tennis Classic – Singles =

Singles
- 1998 IGA Classic

Final
- Champion: (United States) Venus Williams
- Runner-up: (South Africa) Joannette Kruger
- Score: 6–3, 6–2

Details
- Draw: 30
- Seeds: 8

Events
Singles	Doubles
- IGA Classic

Lindsay Davenport was the defending champion but lost in the semifinals to Venus Williams.

Williams won in the final 6–3, 6–2 against Joannette Kruger.

== Seeds ==
A champion seed is indicated in bold text while text in italics indicates the round in which that seed was eliminated. The top two seeds received a bye to the second round.

1. (United States) Lindsay Davenport (semifinals)
2. (France) Sandrine Testud (quarterfinals)
3. (United States) **Venus Williams (champion)**
4. (South Africa) Joannette Kruger (final)
5. (United States) Serena Williams (quarterfinals)
6. (United States) Amy Frazier (second round)
7. (France) Sarah Pitkowski (semifinals)
8. (China) Li Fang (first round)

== Draw ==
Key

- Q = Qualifier
- WC = Wild card
- LL = Lucky loser
- Alt = Alternate
- ITF = ITF entry
- PR = Protected ranking
- SR = Special ranking
- SE = Special exempt
- JE = Junior exempt
- JR = Junior Accelerator Programme entrant
- CO = College Accelerator Programme entrant
- NG = Next Gen Accelerator Program entrant
- w/o = Walkover
- r = Retired
- d = Defaulted

=== Final ===
Final
3	(United States) **Venus Williams**	**6**	**6**
4	(South Africa) Joannette Kruger	3	2

=== Top half ===
First round
(France) **J Halard-Decugis**	**6**	**6**
(Netherlands) K Boogert	3	2
Q	(France) **L Ghirardi**	2	**6**	**6**
(Switzerland) E Gagliardi	**6**	2	4
(Australia) K-A Guse	**6**	5	5
6	(United States) **A Frazier**	4	**7**	**7**
3	(United States) **V Williams**	**6**	**6**
Q	(Japan) N Miyagi	3	2
WC	(South Africa) **M de Swardt**	**7**	**6**
(Belarus) O Barabanschikova	6	2
(Italy) **F Lubiani**	4	**7**	**6**
(Japan) R Hiraki	**6**	5	1
(Japan) **Y Yoshida**	**6**	**6**
8	(China) F Li	3	2

Second round
1	(United States) **L Davenport**	**6**	**6**
(France) J Halard-Decugis	3	3
Q	(France) **L Ghirardi**	2	**6**	**6**
6	(United States) A Frazier	**6**	3	3
3	(United States) **V Williams**	**6**	**6**
WC	(South Africa) M de Swardt	1	3
(Italy) **F Lubiani**	**6**	**6**
(Japan) Y Yoshida	2	4

Quarterfinals
1	(United States) **L Davenport**	**6**	**6**
Q	(France) L Ghirardi	1	4
3	(United States) **V Williams**	**7**	**6**
(Italy) F Lubiani	6	4

Semifinals
1	(United States) L Davenport	**7**	2	3
3	(United States) **V Williams**	6	**6**	**6**

=== Bottom half ===
First round
5	(United States) **S Williams**	**6**	**6**
WC	(United States) K Adams	1	2
Q	(Australia) **A Ellwood**	**6**	**6**
(United States) A Stevenson	4	4
(Canada) P Hy-Boulais	3	**7**	2
(United States) **M McGrath**	**6**	5	**6**
(Australia) R McQuillan	**6**	2	5
4	(South Africa) **J Kruger**	3	**6**	**7**
7	(France) **S Pitkowski**	**7**	**7**
(France) A Dechaume-Balleret	6	6
Q	(United States) **T Snyder**	**6**	**7**
(United States) S Cacic	4	6
(Italy) L Golarsa	2	**6**	5
(Japan) **M Saeki**	**6**	3	**7**

Second round
5	(United States) **S Williams**	**6**	**6**
Q	(Australia) A Ellwood	1	3
(United States) M McGrath
4	(South Africa) **J Kruger**	**w/o**
7	(France) **S Pitkowski**	**6**	**6**
Q	(United States) T Snyder	3	4
(Japan) M Saeki	3	2
2	(France) **S Testud**	**6**	**6**

Quarterfinals
5	(United States) S Williams	1	1
4	(South Africa) **J Kruger**	**6**	**6**
7	(France) **S Pitkowski**	3	**6**	**6**
2	(France) S Testud	**6**	3	4

Semifinals
4	(South Africa) **J Kruger**	3	**6**	**6**
7	(France) S Pitkowski	**6**	3	4
