= 1998 Skoda Czech Open – Doubles =

Doubles
- 1998 Skoda Czech Open

Final
- Champions: (Italy) Silvia Farina; (Slovakia) Karina Habšudová
- Runners-up: (Czech Republic) Květa Hrdličková; (Czech Republic) Michaela Paštiková
- Score: 2–6, 6–1, 6–2

Details
- Draw: 16
- Seeds: 4

Events
Singles	Doubles
← 1997 ·	Skoda Czech Open	· 2005 →

The women's doubles of the 1998 Skoda Czech Open tournament was played on clay in Prague, Czech Republic.

Ruxandra Dragomir and Karina Habšudová were the defending champions but they competed with different partners that year, Dragomir with Åsa Carlsson and Habšudová with Silvia Farina.

Carlsson and Dragomir lost in the first round to Cătălina Cristea and Eva Melicharová.

Farina and Habšudová won in the final 2–6, 6–1, 6–2 against Květa Hrdličková and Michaela Paštiková.

== Seeds ==
Champion seeds are indicated in bold text while text in italics indicates the round in which those seeds were eliminated.

1. (Romania) Cătălina Cristea / (Czech Republic) Eva Melicharová (quarterfinals)
2. (Italy) **Silvia Farina** / (Slovakia) **Karina Habšudová (champions)**
3. (Ukraine) Olga Lugina / (Czech Republic) Helena Vildová (first round)
4. (Slovakia) Janette Husárová / (Spain) Virginia Ruano Pascual (quarterfinals)

== Draw ==
=== Key ===
- Q = Qualifier
- WC = Wild card
- LL = Lucky loser
- Alt = Alternate
- SE = Special exempt
- PR = Protected ranking
- ITF = ITF entry
- JE = Junior exempt
- w/o = Walkover
- r = Retired
- d = Defaulted
- SR = Special ranking

First round

Quarterfinals

Semifinals

Final

1
- (Romania) **C Cristea**
- (Czech Republic) **E Melicharová**
3
**7**
**7**

- (Sweden) Å Carlsson
- (Romania) R Dragomir
**6**
5
5

1
- (Romania) C Cristea
- (Czech Republic) E Melicharová
3
1

- (Czech Republic) K Kroupová
- (Czech Republic) E Martincová
5
**6**
4

- (South Korea) **E-H Kim**
- (France) **É Loit**
**6**
**6**

- (South Korea) **E-H Kim**
- (France) **É Loit**
**7**
3
**6**

- (South Korea) E-H Kim
- (France) É Loit
0
4

3
- (Ukraine) O Lugina
- (Czech Republic) H Vildová
2
0

WC
- (Czech Republic) **K Hrdličková**
- (Czech Republic) **M Paštiková**
**6**
**6**

Q
- (Russia) **E Kulikovskaya**
- (Russia) **E Makarova**
**6**
**6**

Q
- (Russia) E Kulikovskaya
- (Russia) E Makarova
1
4

WC
- (Czech Republic) **K Hrdličková**
- (Czech Republic) **M Paštiková**
**6**
**6**

WC
- (Czech Republic) **K Hrdličková**
- (Czech Republic) **M Paštiková**
**6**
**6**

- (South Africa) L Horn
- (South Africa) J Kruger
4
2

WC
- (Czech Republic) Květa Hrdličková
- (Czech Republic) Michaela Paštiková
**6**
1
1

- (Netherlands) S Noorlander
- (Australia) L Pleming
4
1

2
- (Italy) **Silvia Farina**
- (Slovakia) **Karina Habšudová**
2
**6**
**6**

- (Czech Republic) **R Bobková**
- (Germany) **C Schneider**
**6**
**6**

- (Czech Republic) **R Bobková**
- (Germany) **C Schneider**
**w/o**

- (France) A Mauresmo
- (France) S Pitkowski
2
5

4
- (Slovakia) J Husárová
- (Spain) V Ruano Pascual

4
- (Slovakia) **J Husárová**
- (Spain) **V Ruano Pascual**
**6**
**7**

- (Czech Republic) R Bobková
- (Germany) C Schneider
2
**6**
2

- (Argentina) C Contín
- (Spain) M Ramón Climent
4
3

2
- (Italy) **S Farina**
- (Slovakia) **K Habšudová**
**6**
4
**6**

- (United States) **R Jensen**
- (Australia) **D Jones**
**6**
**6**

- (United States) R Jensen
- (Australia) D Jones
3
4

- (Bulgaria) S Krivencheva
- (Czech Republic) P Langrová
4
**6**
6

2
- (Italy) **S Farina**
- (Slovakia) **K Habšudová**
**6**
**6**

2
- (Italy) **S Farina**
- (Slovakia) **K Habšudová**
**6**
3
**7**
