= 1998 Acura Classic – Singles =

Singles
- 1998 Acura Classic
- 1997 Champion: (United States) Monica Seles

Final
- Champion: (United States) Lindsay Davenport
- Runner-up: (Switzerland) Martina Hingis
- Score: 4–6, 6–4, 6–3

Details
- Draw: 28
- Seeds: 8

Events
Singles	Doubles
- WTA Los Angeles

Monica Seles was the defending champion but lost in the semifinals to Lindsay Davenport.

Davenport won in the final 4–6, 6–4, 6–3 against Martina Hingis.

== Seeds ==
A champion seed is indicated in bold text while text in italics indicates the round in which that seed was eliminated. The top four seeds received a bye to the second round.

1. (Switzerland) Martina Hingis (final)
2. (United States) **Lindsay Davenport (champion)**
3. (Spain) Arantxa Sánchez Vicario (semifinals)
4. (United States) Monica Seles (semifinals)
5. (France) Nathalie Tauziat (quarterfinals)
6. (Romania) Irina Spîrlea (second round)
7. (France) Sandrine Testud (second round)
8. (Belarus) Natasha Zvereva (quarterfinals)

== Draw ==
Key

- Q = Qualifier
- WC = Wild card
- LL = Lucky loser
- Alt = Alternate
- ITF = ITF entry
- PR = Protected ranking
- SR = Special ranking
- SE = Special exempt
- JE = Junior exempt
- JR = Junior Accelerator Programme entrant
- CO = College Accelerator Programme entrant
- NG = Next Gen Accelerator Program entrant
- w/o = Walkover
- r = Retired
- d = Defaulted

=== Final ===
Final
1	(Switzerland) Martina Hingis	**6**	4	3
2	(United States) **Lindsay Davenport**	4	**6**	**6**

=== Top half ===
First round
(Croatia) **I Majoli**	1	**6**	**6**
(Italy) R Grande	**6**	2	4
(United States) **S Williams**	**6**	**6**
Q	(Latvia) L Neiland	0	0
Q	(Italy) A Serra Zanetti	3	5
7	(France) **S Testud**	**6**	**7**
WC	(France) A-G Sidot	4	3
(Japan) **A Sugiyama**	**6**	**6**
LL	(Ukraine) **E Tatarkova**	4	**6**	**6**
(Indonesia) Y Basuki	**6**	3	3
(China) F Li	0	2
6	(Romania) **I Spîrlea**	**6**	**6**

Second round
1	(Switzerland) **M Hingis**	**6**	**6**
(Croatia) I Majoli	3	3
(United States) **S Williams**	**6**	3	**6**
7	(France) S Testud	4	**6**	1
3	(Spain) **A Sánchez Vicario**	4	**6**	**6**
(Japan) A Sugiyama	**6**	4	4
LL	(Ukraine) **E Tatarkova**	**6**	**6**
6	(Romania) I Spîrlea	2	2

Quarterfinals
1	(Switzerland) **M Hingis**	**6**	**6**
(United States) S Williams	4	1
3	(Spain) **A Sánchez Vicario**	**6**	**6**
LL	(Ukraine) E Tatarkova	3	3

Semifinals
1	(Switzerland) **M Hingis**	**6**	**6**
3	(Spain) A Sánchez Vicario	4	4

=== Bottom half ===
First round
5	(France) **N Tauziat**	**6**	**7**
WC	(United States) C Rubin	4	5
(France) **A Fusai**	**6**	**6**
Q	(United States) A Stevenson	3	3
(Japan) N Sawamatsu	**6**	3	2
(Austria) **B Paulus**	3	**6**	**6**
8	(Belarus) **N Zvereva**	**7**	**6**
Q	(Luxembourg) A Kremer	5	2
(Spain) **M Serna**	6	**7**	**6**
WC	(Thailand) T Tanasugarn	**7**	5	2
(France) **J Halard-Decugis**	**6**	**6**
(United States) K Po	2	4

Second round
5	(France) **N Tauziat**	**6**	**6**
(France) A Fusai	3	3
(Austria) B Paulus	1	2
4	(United States) **M Seles**	**6**	**6**
8	(Belarus) **N Zvereva**	**6**	**6**
(Spain) M Serna	2	1
(France) J Halard-Decugis	0	4
2	(United States) **L Davenport**	**6**	**6**

Quarterfinals
5	(France) N Tauziat	4	4
4	(United States) **M Seles**	**6**	**6**
8	(Belarus) N Zvereva	2	3
2	(United States) **L Davenport**	**6**	**6**

Semifinals
4	(United States) M Seles	4	2
2	(United States) **L Davenport**	**6**	**6**
