= 1998 Swisscom Challenge – Singles =

Singles
- 1998 Swisscom Challenge

Final
- Champion: (United States) Lindsay Davenport
- Runner-up: (United States) Venus Williams
- Score: 7–5, 6–3

Details
- Draw: 28
- Seeds: 8

Events
Singles	Doubles
- Swisscom Challenge

Defending champion Lindsay Davenport defeated Venus Williams in the final, 7–5, 6–3 to win the singles tennis title at the 1998 European Indoor Championships.

== Seeds ==
A champion seed is indicated in bold text while text in italics indicates the round in which that seed was eliminated. The top four seeds received a bye to the second round.

1. (United States) **Lindsay Davenport (champion)**
2. (United States) Venus Williams (final)
3. (Spain) Conchita Martínez (second round)
4. (France) Nathalie Tauziat (semifinals)
5. (Switzerland) Patty Schnyder (second round)
6. (South Africa) Amanda Coetzer (quarterfinals)
7. (France) Mary Pierce (quarterfinals)
8. (Belgium) Dominique Van Roost (quarterfinals)

== Draw ==
Key

- Q = Qualifier
- WC = Wild card
- LL = Lucky loser
- Alt = Alternate
- ITF = ITF entry
- PR = Protected ranking
- SR = Special ranking
- SE = Special exempt
- JE = Junior exempt
- JR = Junior Accelerator Programme entrant
- CO = College Accelerator Programme entrant
- NG = Next Gen Accelerator Program entrant
- w/o = Walkover
- r = Retired
- d = Defaulted

=== Final ===
Final
1	(United States) **Lindsay Davenport**	**7**	**6**
2	(United States) Venus Williams	5	3

=== Top half ===
First round
(Japan) A Sugiyama	5	1
Q	(France) **J Halard-Decugis**	**7**	**6**
(Romania) **R Dragomir**	3	**6**	**6**
(Germany) A Huber	**6**	4	4
(Belarus) N Zvereva	5	4
6	(South Africa) **A Coetzer**	**7**	**6**
(Romania) **I Spîrlea**	**7**	**6**
Q	(Netherlands) M Oremans	6	2
Q	(Austria) S Plischke	**6**	4	1
WC	(France) **A Mauresmo**	4	**6**	**6**
(Russia) A Kournikova	3	1
8	(Belgium) **D Van Roost**	**6**	**6**

Second round
1	(United States) **L Davenport**	**6**	**6**
Q	(France) J Halard-Decugis	4	2
(Romania) R Dragomir	3	1
6	(South Africa) **A Coetzer**	**6**	**6**
3	(Spain) C Martínez	2	6
(Romania) **I Spîrlea**	**6**	**7**
WC	(France) A Mauresmo	3	4
8	(Belgium) **D Van Roost**	**6**	**6**

Quarterfinals
1	(United States) **L Davenport**	**6**	**6**
6	(South Africa) A Coetzer	3	1
(Romania) **I Spîrlea**	**6**	**6**
8	(Belgium) D Van Roost	4	0

Semifinals
1	(United States) **L Davenport**	**6**	**6**
(Romania) I Spîrlea	2	3

=== Bottom half ===
First round
5	(Switzerland) **P Schnyder**	**6**	**6**
(Italy) S Farina	2	3
WC	(Austria) **B Schett**	**6**	**6**
(United States) K Po	3	3
LL	(Romania) C Cristea	4	4
(United States) **L Raymond**	**6**	**6**
7	(France) **M Pierce**	**7**	2	**6**
WC	(United States) C Rubin	5	**6**	3
LL	(Czech Republic) K Hrdličková	**6**	4	2
LL	(South Africa) **J Kruger**	2	**6**	**6**
Q	(United States) **C Morariu**	**6**	2	**6**
(France) S Testud	3	**6**	4

Second round
5	(Switzerland) P Schnyder	4	**6**	6
WC	(Austria) **B Schett**	**6**	1	**7**
(United States) L Raymond	2	3
4	(France) **N Tauziat**	**6**	**6**
7	(France) **M Pierce**	**7**	**6**
LL	(South Africa) J Kruger	6	1
Q	(United States) C Morariu	5	3
2	(United States) **V Williams**	**7**	**6**

Quarterfinals
WC	(Austria) B Schett	**6**	5	1
4	(France) **N Tauziat**	4	**7**	**6**
7	(France) M Pierce	4	1
2	(United States) **V Williams**	**6**	**6**

Semifinals
4	(France) N Tauziat	3	4
2	(United States) **V Williams**	**6**	**6**
