= 1998 Skoda Czech Open – Singles =

Singles
- 1998 Skoda Czech Open
- 1997 Champion: (South Africa) Joannette Kruger

Final
- Champion: (Czech Republic) Jana Novotná
- Runner-up: (France) Sandrine Testud
- Score: 6–3, 6–0

Details
- Draw: 32
- Seeds: 8

Events
Singles	Doubles
← 1997 ·	Skoda Czech Open	· 2005 →

The women's singles of the 1998 Skoda Czech Open tournament was played on clay in Prague, Czech Republic.

Joannette Kruger was the defending champion but lost in the first round to Virginia Ruano Pascual.

Jana Novotná won in the final 6–3, 6–0 against Sandrine Testud.

== Seeds ==
A champion seed is indicated in bold text while text in italics indicates the round in which that seed was eliminated.

1. (Czech Republic) **Jana Novotná (champion)**
2. (France) Sandrine Testud (final)
3. (South Africa) Joannette Kruger (first round)
4. (Belarus) Natasha Zvereva (semifinals)
5. (Slovakia) Henrieta Nagyová (semifinals)
6. (Italy) Silvia Farina (quarterfinals)
7. (Romania) Ruxandra Dragomir (second round)
8. (France) Amélie Mauresmo (quarterfinals)

== Draw ==
=== Key ===
- Q = Qualifier
- WC = Wild card
- LL = Lucky loser
- Alt = Alternate
- SE = Special exempt
- PR = Protected ranking
- ITF = ITF entry
- JE = Junior exempt
- w/o = Walkover
- r = Retired
- d = Defaulted
- SR = Special ranking

First round
1	(Czech Republic) **J Novotná**	**6**	**7**
(Slovakia) J Husárová	2	6
(Germany) A Glass	4	6
Q	(Czech Republic) **R Bobková**	**6**	**7**
(France) **S Pitkowski**	**6**	3	**6**
(Slovakia) K Habšudová	4	**6**	1
(Czech Republic) K Hrdličková	4	3
7	(Romania) **R Dragomir**	**6**	**6**
3	(South Africa) J Kruger	2	4
(Spain) **V Ruano Pascual**	**6**	**6**
(Ukraine) O Lugina	**7**	4	0
(United States) **M Shaughnessy**	6	**6**	**6**
(Israel) **A Smashnova**	**6**	**7**
Q	(Czech Republic) A Vašková	4	6
(Russia) T Panova	2	4
5	(Slovakia) **H Nagyová**	**6**	**6**
WC/8	(France) **A Mauresmo**	6	**7**	**6**
Q	(Russia) E Dementieva	**7**	6	1
(Netherlands) S Noorlander	4	1
(Russia) **E Makarova**	**6**	**6**
WC	(Czech Republic) **M Paštiková**	**6**	**6**
Q	(Czech Republic) J Hlaváčková	2	1
(Spain) M Sánchez Lorenzo	4	2
4	(Belarus) **N Zvereva**	**6**	**6**
6	(Italy) **S Farina**	**6**	**6**
(Romania) C Cristea	1	3
(Sweden) **Å Carlsson**	**6**	**6**
(Czech Republic) L Němečková	4	4
(Czech Republic) **D Chládková**	**7**	**6**
(Argentina) M Díaz Oliva	6	0
(Czech Republic) A Gerši	0	r
2	(France) **S Testud**	**1**

Second round
1	(Czech Republic) **J Novotná**	**6**	**7**
Q	(Czech Republic) R Bobková	2	6
(France) **S Pitkowski**	**7**	**6**
7	(Romania) R Dragomir	5	3
(Spain) V Ruano Pascual	**6**	3	5
(United States) **M Shaughnessy**	4	**6**	**7**
(Israel) A Smashnova	5	**6**	4
5	(Slovakia) **H Nagyová**	**7**	4	**6**
WC/8	(France) **A Mauresmo**	**7**	**6**
(Russia) E Makarova	5	1
WC	(Czech Republic) M Paštiková	5	**6**	1
4	(Belarus) **N Zvereva**	**7**	3	**6**
6	(Italy) **S Farina**	**7**	4	**6**
(Sweden) Å Carlsson	5	**6**	1
(Czech Republic) D Chládková	6	5
2	(France) **S Testud**	**7**	**7**

Quarterfinals
1	(Czech Republic) **J Novotná**	**6**	**6**
(France) S Pitkowski	2	3
(United States) M Shaughnessy	1	2
5	(Slovakia) **H Nagyová**	**6**	**6**
WC/8	(France) A Mauresmo	3	2
4	(Belarus) **N Zvereva**	**6**	**6**
6	(Italy) S Farina	**6**	3	2
2	(France) **S Testud**	2	**6**	**6**

Semifinals
1	(Czech Republic) **J Novotná**	2	**6**	**7**
5	(Slovakia) H Nagyová	**6**	3	5
4	(Belarus) N Zvereva	3	**6**	4
2	(France) **S Testud**	**6**	4	**6**

Final
1	(Czech Republic) **Jana Novotná**	**6**	**6**
2	(France) Sandrine Testud	3	0
