= 1998 Acura Classic – Doubles =

Doubles
- 1998 Acura Classic

Final
- Champions: (Switzerland) Martina Hingis (Belarus) Natasha Zvereva
- Runners-up: (Thailand) Tamarine Tanasugarn (Ukraine) Elena Tatarkova
- Score: 6–4, 6–2

Details
- Draw: 16
- Seeds: 4

Events
Singles	Doubles
- WTA Los Angeles

Yayuk Basuki and Caroline Vis were the defending champions but lost in the first round to Chanda Rubin and Irina Spîrlea.

Martina Hingis and Natasha Zvereva won in the final 6–4, 6–2 against Tamarine Tanasugarn and Elena Tatarkova.

== Seeds ==
Champion seeds are indicated in bold text while text in italics indicates the round in which those seeds were eliminated.

1. (Switzerland) **Martina Hingis** / (Belarus) **Natasha Zvereva (champions)**
2. (France) Alexandra Fusai / (France) Nathalie Tauziat (first round)
3. (Indonesia) Yayuk Basuki / (Netherlands) Caroline Vis (first round)
4. (Spain) Arantxa Sánchez Vicario / (Argentina) Patricia Tarabini (quarterfinals)

== Draw ==
Key

- Q = Qualifier
- WC = Wild card
- LL = Lucky loser
- Alt = Alternate
- ITF = ITF entry
- PR = Protected ranking
- SR = Special ranking
- SE = Special exempt
- JE = Junior exempt
- JR = Junior Accelerator Programme entrant
- CO = College Accelerator Programme entrant
- NG = Next Gen Accelerator Program entrant
- w/o = Walkover
- r = Retired
- d = Defaulted

First round
1	(Switzerland) **M Hingis** (Belarus) **N Zvereva**	**6**	**6**
(France) J Halard-Decugis (Latvia) L Neiland	1	3
WC	(United States) L Osterloh (United States) M Washington	4	**7**	4
(Australia) **C Barclay** (Australia) **K-A Guse**	**6**	6	**6**
4	(Spain) **A Sánchez Vicario** (Argentina) **P Tarabini**	**6**	1	**6**
LL	(Chinese Taipei) J Lee (United States) L Lee	2	**6**	2
(United States) **L McNeil** (United States) **K Po**	**6**	**6**
Q	(United States) M Mazzotta (Italy) A Serra Zanetti	3	4
(United States) **K Adams** (Netherlands) **M Bollegraf**	**7**	**6**
(Austria) K Kschwendt (Croatia) I Majoli	6	0
(United States) **C Rubin** (Romania) **I Spîrlea**	**6**	**6**
3	(Indonesia) Y Basuki (Netherlands) C Vis	2	1
(Italy) R Grande (France) S Testud	3	3
(Thailand) **T Tanasugarn** (Ukraine) **E Tatarkova**	**6**	**6**
(Argentina) **I Gorrochategui** (United States) **D Graham**	**6**	1	**6**
2	(France) A Fusai (France) N Tauziat	4	**6**	3

Quarterfinals
1	(Switzerland) **M Hingis** (Belarus) **N Zvereva**	**w/o**
(Australia) C Barclay (Australia) K-A Guse
4	(Spain) A Sánchez Vicario (Argentina) P Tarabini	3	4
(United States) **L McNeil** (United States) **K Po**	**6**	**6**
(United States) K Adams (Netherlands) M Bollegraf	**6**	6	5
(United States) **C Rubin** (Romania) **I Spîrlea**	1	**7**	**7**
(Thailand) **T Tanasugarn** (Ukraine) **E Tatarkova**	**6**	5	**6**
(Argentina) I Gorrochategui (United States) D Graham	4	**7**	2

Semifinals
1	(Switzerland) **M Hingis** (Belarus) **N Zvereva**	**6**	**6**
(United States) L McNeil (United States) K Po	2	3
(United States) C Rubin (Romania) I Spîrlea	4	2
(Thailand) **T Tanasugarn** (Ukraine) **E Tatarkova**	**6**	**6**

Final
1	(Switzerland) **Martina Hingis** (Belarus) **Natasha Zvereva**	**6**	**6**
(Thailand) Tamarine Tanasugarn (Ukraine) Elena Tatarkova	4	2
