= 1998 Swisscom Challenge – Doubles =

Doubles
- 1998 Swisscom Challenge

Final
- Champions: (United States) Serena Williams (United States) Venus Williams
- Runners-up: (South Africa) Mariaan de Swardt (Ukraine) Elena Tatarkova
- Score: 5–7, 6–1, 6–3

Details
- Draw: 16
- Seeds: 4

Events
Singles	Doubles
- Swisscom Challenge

Martina Hingis and Arantxa Sánchez Vicario were the reigning champions but did not compete that year.

Serena Williams and Venus Williams won in the final 5–7, 6–1, 6–3 against Mariaan de Swardt and Elena Tatarkova.

== Seeds ==
Champion seeds are indicated in bold text while text in italics indicates the round in which those seeds were eliminated.

1. (United States) Lindsay Davenport / (Belarus) Natasha Zvereva (first round)
2. (France) Alexandra Fusai / (France) Nathalie Tauziat (first round)
3. (United States) Lisa Raymond / (Australia) Rennae Stubbs (quarterfinals)
4. (Indonesia) Yayuk Basuki / (Netherlands) Caroline Vis (first round)

== Draw ==
Key

- Q = Qualifier
- WC = Wild card
- LL = Lucky loser
- Alt = Alternate
- ITF = ITF entry
- PR = Protected ranking
- SR = Special ranking
- SE = Special exempt
- JE = Junior exempt
- JR = Junior Accelerator Programme entrant
- CO = College Accelerator Programme entrant
- NG = Next Gen Accelerator Program entrant
- w/o = Walkover
- r = Retired
- d = Defaulted

First round
1	(United States) L Davenport (Belarus) N Zvereva	6	2
WC	(United States) **S Williams** (United States) **V Williams**	**7**	**6**
Q	(Italy) S Farina (Slovakia) K Habšudová	1	2
(South Africa) **A Coetzer** (Russia) **A Kournikova**	**6**	**6**
3	(United States) **L Raymond** (Australia) **R Stubbs**	**6**	**6**
(Austria) B Schett (Switzerland) P Schnyder	4	3
(Netherlands) **M Bollegraf** (United States) **D Graham**	3	**6**	**6**
(Argentina) F Labat (Belgium) D Van Roost	**6**	4	4
(Germany) M Babel (United States) C Rubin	4	1
(Russia) **E Likhovtseva** (Japan) **A Sugiyama**	**6**	**6**
(United States) **K Adams** (Latvia) **L Neiland**	**6**	**6**
4	(Indonesia) Y Basuki (Netherlands) C Vis	3	4
(United States) K Po (Romania) I Spîrlea	3	1
(Spain) **C Martínez** (Argentina) **P Tarabini**	**6**	**6**
(South Africa) **M de Swardt** (Ukraine) **E Tatarkova**	**6**	4	**6**
2	(France) A Fusai (France) N Tauziat	3	**6**	1

Quarterfinals
WC	(United States) **S Williams** (United States) **V Williams**	4	**6**	**6**
(South Africa) A Coetzer (Russia) A Kournikova	**6**	1	2
3	(United States) L Raymond (Australia) R Stubbs	6	**6**	4
(Netherlands) **M Bollegraf** (United States) **D Graham**	**7**	2	**6**
(Russia) E Likhovtseva (Japan) A Sugiyama	3	**6**	3
(United States) **K Adams** (Latvia) **L Neiland**	**6**	3	**6**
(Spain) C Martínez (Argentina) P Tarabini	**7**	3	5
2	(South Africa) **M de Swardt** (Ukraine) **E Tatarkova**	6	**6**	**7**

Semifinals
WC	(United States) **S Williams** (United States) **V Williams**	**7**	**6**
(Netherlands) M Bollegraf (United States) D Graham	6	2
(United States) K Adams (Latvia) L Neiland	3	3
(South Africa) **M de Swardt** (Ukraine) **E Tatarkova**	**6**	**6**

Final
WC	(United States) **Serena Williams** (United States) **Venus Williams**	5	**6**	**6**
(South Africa) Mariaan de Swardt (Ukraine) Elena Tatarkova	**7**	1	3
