= Boston Cup =

Defunct tennis tournament
- Event name: Boston Cup (1998)
- Tour: WTA Tour
- Founded: 1998
- Abolished: 1998
- Editions: 1
- Surface: Hard

The Boston Cup is a defunct WTA Tour affiliated women's tennis tournament played in 1998. It was held at the Longwood Cricket Club in Chestnut Hill, Massachusetts in the United States and played on outdoor hard courts.

== Results ==
=== Singles ===
Year	Champions	Runners-up	Score
1998	(South Africa) Mariaan de Swardt	(Austria) Barbara Schett	3–6, 7–6, 7–5

=== Doubles ===
Year	Champions	Runners-up	Score
1998	(United States) Lisa Raymond (Australia) Rennae Stubbs	(South Africa) Mariaan de Swardt (United States) Mary Joe Fernández	6–4, 6–4
