= Mary Joe Fernandez =

American tennis player

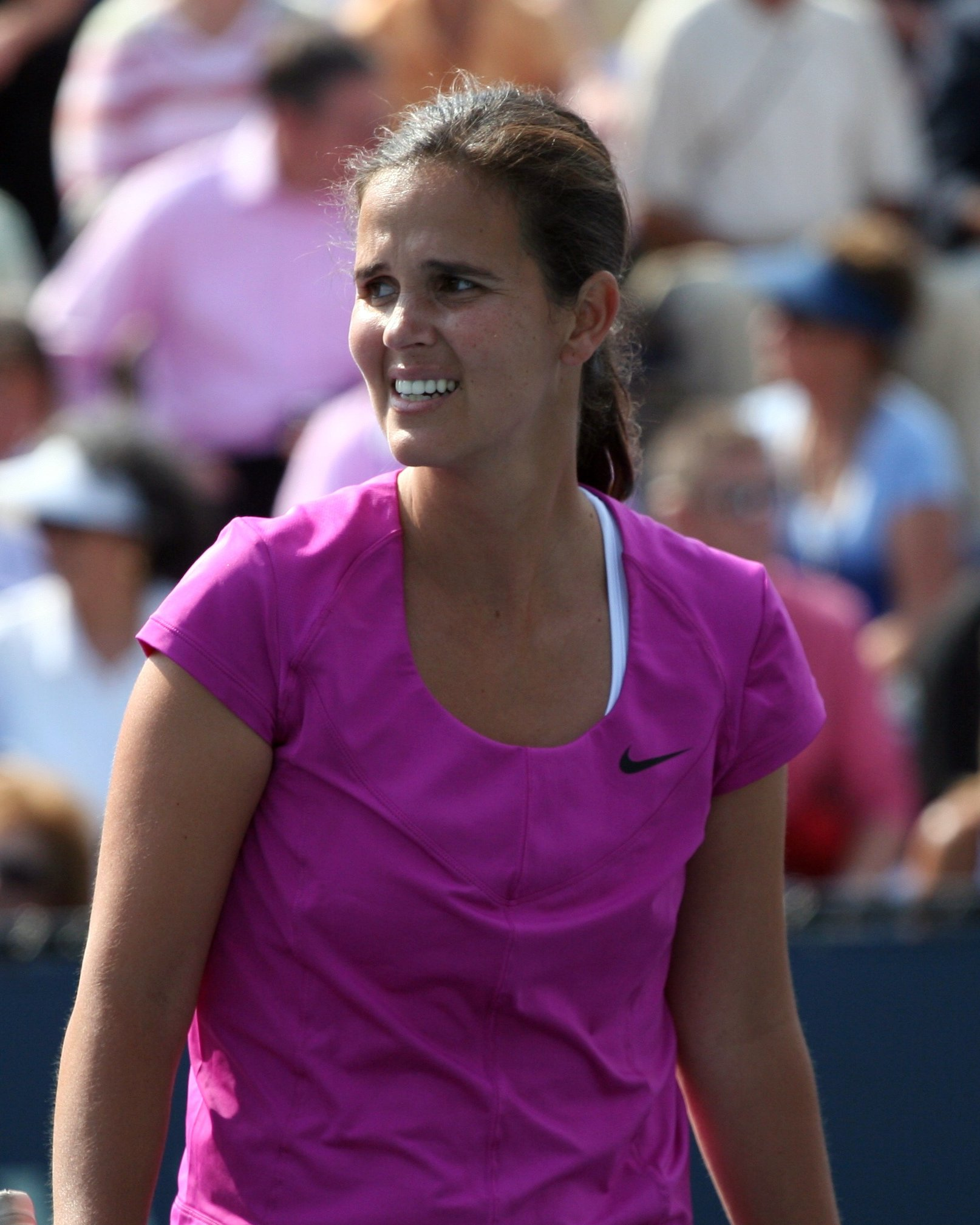
- Country (sports): United States
- Residence: Miami, Florida, U.S.
- Born: August 19, 1971 (age 55) Santo Domingo, Dominican Republic
- Height: 1.75 m (5 ft 9 in)
- Turned pro: 1986
- Retired: 2000
- Plays: Right-handed (two-handed backhand)
- Prize money: $5,258,471

Singles
- Career record: 437–203
- Career titles: 7 WTA
- Highest ranking: No. 4 (October 22, 1990)

Grand Slam singles results
- Australian Open: F (1990, 1992)
- French Open: F (1993)
- Wimbledon: SF (1991)
- US Open: SF (1990, 1992)

Doubles
- Career record: 344–141
- Career titles: 17 WTA, 2 ITF
- Highest ranking: No. 4 (February 18, 1991)

Grand Slam doubles results
- Australian Open: W (1991)
- French Open: W (1996)
- Wimbledon: SF (1991, 1993)
- US Open: F (1989)

Other doubles tournaments
- Tour Finals: W (1996)
Medal record
Women's tennis
Representing United States
Olympic Games
Gold medal – first place	1992 Barcelona	Women's doubles
Gold medal – first place	1996 Atlanta	Women's doubles
Bronze medal – third place	1992 Barcelona	Women's singles

Mary Joe Fernandez Godsick (born María José Fernández; August 19, 1971) is a Dominican-born tennis Olympic gold medalist. A former professional tennis player, who reached a career-high ranking of world No. 4 in both singles and doubles. In singles, Fernandez was the runner-up at the 1990 and 1992 Australian Open, and the 1993 French Open. She also won a bronze medal at the 1992 Summer Olympics. In doubles, she won the 1991 Australian Open with Patty Fendick and the 1996 French Open with Lindsay Davenport, plus two Olympic gold medals.

== Career ==
Fernandez first came to the tennis world's attention as an outstanding junior player who won four straight Orange Bowl junior titles. In 1985, aged 14 years and eight days, she became the youngest player to win a main draw match at the US Open when she defeated Sara Gomer in the first round.

Turning professional in 1986, she won her first tour doubles title in 1989 at Dallas, partnering Betsy Nagelsen. She was also semifinalist at the 1989 French Open, losing to Arantxa Sánchez Vicario 2–6, 2–6.

She reached her first Grand Slam singles final in 1990 at the Australian Open, where she was defeated by Steffi Graf 3–6, 4–6 (having held a 4–1 lead herself in the second set). She won her first WTA Tour singles title the same year at the Tokyo Indoor championships, and finished the year ranked a career-high world No. 4 in singles.

In 1991, Fernandez reached the semifinals of the Australian Open, where she was match point up against Monica Seles, before eventually losing 3–6, 6–0, 7–9. She teamed with Patty Fendick to win the women's Australian Open doubles title. At Wimbledon, she reached the semifinals, losing to Steffi Graf in straight sets.

She reached the Australian Open singles final again in 1992, beating world No. 3, Gabriela Sabatini, in the semifinals before losing to Seles, 2–6, 3–6. She also reached the semifinals of the US Open, beating Sabatini in the quarterfinals and losing once again to Seles. At the 1992 Olympic Games in Barcelona, Fernandez was selected to represent the United States and won both a gold medal in women's doubles (with Gigi Fernández; no relation) and a bronze medal in singles.

In 1993, she won the title in Indian Wells, defeating Amanda Coetzer in the final. At the French Open, she defeated world No. 5 Sabatini in the quarterfinals and world No. 3 Sánchez Vicario in the semifinals. In the final against Steffi Graf, Fernandez held several points to lead 3–0 in the final set, but eventually lost 4-6, 6-2, 6-4.

Fernandez won her second Grand Slam doubles title in 1996 at the French Open, partnering with Lindsay Davenport. The pair went on to capture the year-end WTA Tour Championships doubles title later that year.

She was a late replacement for Chanda Rubin on the United States team for the 1996 Olympic Games in Atlanta. She won a second straight women's doubles gold medal, again in partnership with Gigi Fernández. She was also entered in the singles competition (owing to a withdrawal), and reached the semifinals, defeating world No. 2, Conchita Martínez, in the quarterfinals. She was defeated for the bronze medal by Jana Novotná. Later that year, Fernandez was a member of the U.S. team that won the Fed Cup.

Fernandez reached the semifinals of the Australian Open in 1997, losing to Martina Hingis 1–6, 3–6. In May, she won her first and only Tier I tournament in Berlin, beating Jana Novotná in the semifinals and Mary Pierce in the final. At the end-of-year WTA Finals, she defeated world No. 2, Lindsay Davenport.

In 1999, she defeated Serena Williams in the third round of the French Open and in her last Grand Slam appearance she lost to Venus Williams in the fourth round of the US Open the same year.

She retired from the tour in 2000, having won a total of 24 titles: seven WTA singles titles and 17 doubles titles.

== Post-retirement ==
Fernandez coached the US Fed Cup team from 2008 to 2016 and served as the woman's coach for the 2012 U.S. Olympic tennis team in London.

She currently works as an analyst and commentator for ESPN.

== Personal life ==
Fernandez was born in the Dominican Republic; her parents were immigrants to the country. Her father José is from Asturias, Spain, and her mother Silvia Pino is from Cuba. She completed her high school education at the Carrollton School of the Sacred Heart in Miami, Florida.

In April 2000, Fernandez married Anthony (Tony) Godsick, a sports agent with International Management Group. Monica Seles was a bridesmaid at the wedding. They have two children. Her husband is the current agent of Roger Federer. One of their children, Nicholas Godsick, is also a tennis player.

She has homes in Cleveland, Ohio, and Key Biscayne, Florida.

== Significant finals ==
=== Grand Slam tournaments ===
==== Singles: 3 (3 runner-ups) ====
Result	Year	Championship	Surface	Opponent	Score
Loss	1990	Australian Open	Hard	(West Germany) Steffi Graf	3–6, 4–6
Loss	1992	Australian Open	Hard	Monica Seles	2–6, 3–6
Loss	1993	French Open	Clay	(West Germany) Steffi Graf	6–4, 2–6, 4–6

==== Doubles: 7 (2 titles, 5 runner-ups) ====
Result	Year	Championship	Surface	Partner	Opponents	Score
Loss	1989	US Open	Hard	(United States) Pam Shriver	(Australia) Hana Mandlíková (United States) Martina Navratilova	7–5, 4–6, 4–6
Loss	1990	Australian Open	Hard	(United States) Patty Fendick	(Czechoslovakia) Jana Novotná (Czechoslovakia) Helena Suková	6–7^{(5–7)}, 6–7^{(6–8)}
Win	1991	Australian Open	Hard	(United States) Patty Fendick	(United States) Gigi Fernández (Czechoslovakia) Jana Novotná	7–6^{(7–4)}, 6–1
Loss	1992	Australian Open	Hard	(United States) Zina Garrison	(Spain) Arantxa Sánchez Vicario (Czechoslovakia) Helena Suková	4–6, 6–7^{(4–7)}
Loss	1996	Australian Open	Hard	(United States) Lindsay Davenport	(United States) Chanda Rubin (Spain) Arantxa Sánchez Vicario	5–7, 6–2, 4–6
Win	1996	French Open	Clay	(United States) Lindsay Davenport	(United States) Gigi Fernández (Belarus) Natasha Zvereva	6–2, 6–1
Loss	1997	French Open	Clay	(United States) Lisa Raymond	(United States) Gigi Fernández (Belarus) Natasha Zvereva	2–6, 3–6

=== Olympics ===
==== Singles: 1 (bronze medal) ====
Result	Year	Location	Surface	Opponent	Score
Bronze	1992	Barcelona	Clay	Tied	DNP

Mary Joe Fernandez lost in the semifinals to Steffi Graf, 4–6, 2–6. In 1992, there was no bronze medal play-off match, both beaten semifinal players received bronze medals.

==== Doubles: 2 (2 gold medals) ====
Result	Year	Location	Surface	Partner	Opponents	Score
Gold	1992	Barcelona	Clay	(United States) Gigi Fernández	(Spain) Conchita Martínez (Spain) Arantxa Sánchez Vicario	7–5, 2–6, 6–2
Gold	1996	Atlanta	Hard	(United States) Gigi Fernández	(Czech Republic) Jana Novotná (Czech Republic) Helena Suková	7–6^{(9–7)}, 6–4

=== Year-end championships ===
==== Doubles: 1 title ====
Result	Year	Location	Surface	Partner	Opponents	Score
Win	1996	New York	Carpet (i)	(United States) Lindsay Davenport	(Czech Republic) Jana Novotná (Spain) Arantxa Sánchez Vicario	6–3, 6–2

== WTA career finals ==
=== Singles: 16 (7–9) ===
Finals by surface
Hard (2–4)
Grass (0–1)
Clay (2–2)
Carpet (3–2)

Result	W/L	Date	Tournament	Surface	Opponent	Score
Loss	0–1	Oct 1989	Porsche Tennis Grand Prix	Carpet (i)	(Argentina) Gabriela Sabatini	6–7^{(5–7)}, 4–6
Loss	0–2	Jan 1990	Australian Open	Hard	(West Germany) Steffi Graf	3–6, 4–6
Win	1–2	Sep 1990	Tokyo Championships	Carpet (i)	(United States) Amy Frazier	3–6, 6–2, 6–3
Win	2–2	Oct 1990	Porsche Tennis Grand Prix	Carpet (i)	(Austria) Barbara Paulus	6–1, 6–3
Loss	2–3	Apr 1991	VS Houston	Clay	(Socialist Federal Republic of Yugoslavia) Monica Seles	4–6, 3–6
Loss	2–4	Sep 1991	Tokyo Championships	Hard	(Socialist Federal Republic of Yugoslavia) Monica Seles	1–6, 1–6
Loss	2–5	Jan 1992	Australian Open	Hard	(Socialist Federal Republic of Yugoslavia) Monica Seles	2–6, 3–6
Loss	2–6	Feb 1992	Essen Grand Prix	Carpet (i)	(Socialist Federal Republic of Yugoslavia) Monica Seles	0–6, 3–6
Win	3–6	Feb 1993	Indian Wells Masters	Hard	(South Africa) Amanda Coetzer	3–6, 6–1, 7–6^{(8–6)}
Loss	3–7	May 1993	French Open	Clay	(Germany) Steffi Graf	6–4, 2–6, 4–6
Loss	3–8	Jun 1994	Sydney International	Hard	(Japan) Kimiko Date	4–6, 2–6
Win	4–8	May 1994	Internationaux de Strasbourg	Clay	(Argentina) Gabriela Sabatini	2–6, 6–4, 6–0
Win	5–8	Feb 1995	Indian Wells Masters	Hard	(Belarus) Natasha Zvereva	6–4, 6–3
Win	6–8	Oct 1995	Brighton International	Carpet (i)	(South Africa) Amanda Coetzer	6–4, 7–5
Loss	6–9	Jun 1996	Eastbourne International	Grass	(United States) Monica Seles	0–6, 2–6
Win	7–9	May 1997	German Open	Clay	(France) Mary Pierce	6–4, 6–2

=== Doubles: 41 (17–24) ===
Legend Grand Slam tournaments (2–5) WTA Championships (1–0) Tier I (2–5) Tier II (8–11) Tier III (4–3) Tier IV (0–0) Tier V (0–0)	Finals by surface Hard (7–14) Grass (0–1) Clay (5–4) Carpet (5–5)

Result	W/L	Date	Tournament	Surface	Partner	Opponents	Score
Loss	1.	Jan 1989	Pan Pacific Open, Japan	Carpet (i)	(West Germany) Claudia Kohde-Kilsch	(United States) Katrina Adams (United States) Zina Garrison	3–6, 6–3, 6–7^{(5–7)}
Loss	2.	Mar 1989	VS Boca Raton, U.S.	Hard	(United Kingdom) Jo Durie	(Czechoslovakia) Jana Novotná (Czechoslovakia) Helena Suková	4–6, 2–6
Loss	3.	Aug 1989	LA Championships, U.S.	Hard	(West Germany) Claudia Kohde-Kilsch	(United States) Martina Navratilova (Australia) Wendy Turnbull	2–5 ret.
Loss	4.	Aug 1989	US Open	Hard	(United States) Pam Shriver	(Australia) Hana Mandlíková (United States) Martina Navratilova	7–5, 4–6, 4–6
Win	1.	Sep 1989	VS Dallas, U.S.	Carpet (i)	(United States) Betsy Nagelsen	(United States) Elise Burgin (South Africa) Rosalyn Fairbank	7–6^{(7–5)}, 6–3
Loss	5.	Jan 1990	Australian Open	Hard	(United States) Patty Fendick	(Czechoslovakia) Jana Novotná (Czechoslovakia) Helena Suková	6–7^{(5–7)}, 6–7^{(3–7)}
Win	2.	Sep 1990	Tokyo Championships, Japan	Carpet (i)	(United States) Robin White	(United States) Gigi Fernández (United States) Martina Navratilova	4–6, 6–3, 7–6^{(7–4)}
Win	3.	Oct 1990	Porsche Tennis Grand Prix, Germany	Carpet (i)	(United States) Zina Garrison	(Argentina) Mercedes Paz (Spain) Arantxa Sánchez Vicario	7–5, 6–3
Loss	6.	Nov 1990	VS Worcester, U.S.	Carpet (i)	(Czechoslovakia) Jana Novotná	(United States) Gigi Fernández (Czechoslovakia) Helena Suková	6–3, 3–6, 3–6
Win	4.	Jan, 1991	Australian Open	Hard	(United States) Patty Fendick	(United States) Gigi Fernández (Czechoslovakia) Jana Novotná	7–6^{(7–4)}, 6–1
Loss	7.	Jan 1991	Pan Pacific Open, Japan	Carpet (i)	(United States) Robin White	(United States) Kathy Jordan (Australia) Elizabeth Smylie	6–4, 0–6, 3–6
Win	5.	Mar 1991	Miami Masters, U.S.	Hard	(United States) Zina Garrison	(United States) Gigi Fernández (Czechoslovakia) Jana Novotná	7–5, 6–2
Loss	8.	Apr 1991	VS Houston, U.S.	Clay	(United States) Patty Fendick	(Canada) Jill Hetherington (United States) Kathy Rinaldi	1–6, 6–2, 1–6
Win	6.	Sep 1991	Tokyo Championships, Japan	Hard	(United States) Pam Shriver	(United States) Carrie Cunningham (Peru) Laura Gildemeister	6–3, 6–3
Loss	9.	Nov 1991	Championships of Philadelphia, U.S.	Carpet (i)	(United States) Zina Garrison	(Soviet Union) Larisa Neiland (Czechoslovakia) Jana Novotná	2–6, 4–6
Loss	10.	Jan 1992	Sydney International, Australia	Hard	(United States) Zina Garrison	(Spain) Arantxa Sánchez Vicario (Czechoslovakia) Helena Suková	6–7^{(4–7)}, 7–6^{(4–7)}, 2–6
Loss	11.	Jan 1992	Australian Open	Hard	(United States) Zina Garrison	(Spain) Arantxa Sánchez Vicario (Czechoslovakia) Helena Suková	4–6, 6–7^{(3–7)}
Loss	12.	Jun 1992	Eastbourne International, UK	Grass	(United States) Zina Garrison	(Latvia) Larisa Neiland (Czechoslovakia) Jana Novotná	0–6, 3–6
Win	7.	Sep 1992	Tokyo Championships, Japan	Hard	(United States) Robin White	(Indonesia) Yayuk Basuki (Japan) Nana Miyagi	6–4, 6–4
Loss	13.	Mar 1993	Italian Open	Clay	(United States) Zina Garrison	(Czech Republic) Jana Novotná (Spain) Arantxa Sánchez Vicario	4–6, 2–6
Win	8.	May 1993	European Open, Switzerland	Clay	(Czech Republic) Helena Suková	(United States) Lindsay Davenport (United States) Marianne Werdel	6–2, 6–4
Loss	14.	Oct 1994	Brighton International, UK	Carpet (i)	(Czech Republic) Jana Novotná	(Netherlands) Manon Bollegraf (Latvia) Larisa Neiland	6–4, 2–6, 3–6
Loss	15.	Jan 1995	Sydney International, Australia	Hard	(United States) Patty Fendick	(United States) Lindsay Davenport (Czech Republic) Jana Novotná	5–7, 6–2, 4–6
Win	9.	Mar 1995	VS Delray Beach, U.S.	Hard	(Czech Republic) Jana Novotná	(United States) Lori McNeil (Latvia) Larisa Neiland	6–2, 6–4
Win	10.	May 1995	Internationaux de Strasbourg, France	Clay	(United States) Lindsay Davenport	(Belgium) Sabine Appelmans (Netherlands) Miriam Oremans	6–2, 6–3
Win	11.	Sep 1995	Tokyo Championships, Japan	Hard	(United States) Lindsay Davenport	(South Africa) Amanda Coetzer (United States) Linda Wild	6–3, 6–2
Win	12.	Jan 1996	Sydney International, Australia	Hard	(United States) Lindsay Davenport	(United States) Lori McNeil (Czech Republic) Helena Suková	6–3, 6–3
Loss	16.	Jan 1996	Australian Open	Hard	(United States) Lindsay Davenport	(United States) Chanda Rubin (Spain) Arantxa Sánchez Vicario	5–7, 6–2, 4–6
Loss	17.	Apr 1996	Hilton Head Cup, U.S.	Clay	(United States) Gigi Fernández	(Czech Republic) Jana Novotná (Spain) Arantxa Sánchez Vicario	2–6, 3–6
Win	13.	May 1996	French Open	Clay	(United States) Lindsay Davenport	(United States) Gigi Fernández (Belarus) Natasha Zvereva	6–2, 6–1
Loss	18.	Aug 1996	Canadian Open	Hard	(Czech Republic) Helena Suková	(Latvia) Larisa Neiland (Spain) Arantxa Sánchez Vicario	6–7^{(1–7)}, 1–6
Win	14.	Nov 1996	Oakland Classic, U.S.	Carpet (i)	(United States) Lindsay Davenport	(Romania) Irina Spîrlea (France) Nathalie Tauziat	6–1, 6–3
Win	15.	Nov 1996	WTA Tour Championships, New York	Carpet (i)	(United States) Lindsay Davenport	(Czech Republic) Jana Novotná (Spain) Arantxa Sánchez Vicario	6–3, 6–2
Win	16.	Mar 1997	Hilton Head Cup, U.S.	Clay	(Switzerland) Martina Hingis	(United States) Lindsay Davenport (Czech Republic) Jana Novotná	7–5, 4–6, 6–1
Win	17.	May 1997	Madrid Open, Spain	Clay	(Spain) Arantxa Sánchez Vicario	(Argentina) Inés Gorrochategui (Romania) Irina Spîrlea	6–3, 6–2
Loss	19.	May 1997	French Open	Clay	(United States) Lisa Raymond	(United States) Gigi Fernández (Belarus) Natasha Zvereva	2–6, 3–6
Loss	20.	Aug 1998	Boston Cup, U.S.	Hard	(South Africa) Mariaan de Swardt	(United States) Lisa Raymond (Australia) Rennae Stubbs	4–6, 4–6
Loss	21.	Sep 1998	Tokyo Cup, Japan	Hard	(Spain) Arantxa Sánchez Vicario	(Russia) Anna Kournikova (United States) Monica Seles	4–6, 4–6
Loss	22.	Jan 1999	Sydney International, Australia	Hard	(Germany) Anke Huber	(Russia) Elena Likhovtseva (Japan) Ai Sugiyama	3–6, 6–2, 0–6
Loss	23.	Mar 1999	Indian Wells Masters, U.S.	Hard	(Czech Republic) Jana Novotná	(Switzerland) Martina Hingis (Russia) Anna Kournikova	2–6, 2–6
Loss	24.	Mar 1999	Miami Masters, U.S.	Hard	(United States) Monica Seles	(Switzerland) Martina Hingis (Czech Republic) Jana Novotná	6–0, 4–6, 6–7^{(1–7)}

== Grand Slam performance timelines ==
Key
W	F	SF	QF	#R	RR	Q#	DNQ	A	NH

(W) winner; (F) finalist; (SF) semifinalist; (QF) quarterfinalist; (#R) rounds 4, 3, 2, 1; (RR) round-robin stage; (Q#) qualification round; (DNQ) did not qualify; (A) absent; (NH) not held; (SR) strike rate (events won / competed); (W–L) win–loss record.

=== Singles ===
Tournament	1985	1986	1987	1988	1989	1990	1991	1992	1993	1994	1995	1996	1997	1998	1999	Career SR
Australian Open	A	NH	A	A	3R	F	SF	F	QF	4R	4R	4R	SF	A	3R	0 / 10
French Open	1R	QF	2R	A	SF	QF	QF	3R	F	3R	1R	4R	QF	A	4R	0 / 13
Wimbledon	A	1R	4R	4R	4R	A	SF	3R	3R	3R	QF	QF	4R	A	1R	0 / 12
US Open	2R	3R	3R	3R	1R	SF	3R	SF	A	3R	QF	A	4R	3R	4R	0 / 13
SR	0 / 2	0 / 3	0 / 3	0 / 2	0 / 4	0 / 3	0 / 4	0 / 4	0 / 3	0 / 4	0 / 4	0 / 3	0 / 4	0 / 1	0 / 4	0 / 48
Career statistics
Year-end ranking	99	27	20	15	12	4	8	6	7	14	8	16	10	76	38	

=== Doubles ===
Tournament	1986	1987	1988	1989	1990	1991	1992	1993	1994	1995	1996	1997	1998	1999	Career SR
Australian Open	NH	A	A	QF	F	W	F	QF	QF	QF	F	2R	A	2R	1 / 10
French Open	A	1R	A	2R	A	QF	1R	3R	3R	SF	W	F	A	2R	1 / 10
Wimbledon	A	1R	A	A	A	SF	QF	SF	1R	1R	QF	QF	A	QF	0 / 9
US Open	1R	2R	2R	F	A	SF	QF	A	A	A	A	3R	3R	QF	0 / 9
SR	0 / 1	0 / 3	0 / 1	0 / 3	0 / 1	1 / 4	0 / 4	0 / 3	0 / 3	0 / 3	1 / 3	0 / 4	0 / 1	0 / 4	2 / 38
Career statistics
Year-end ranking	131	85	63	8	6	5	11	15	26	10	5	16	89	26	

Sporting positions
Preceded by (Argentina) Gabriela Sabatini	Orange Bowl Girls' Singles Champion; Category: 18 and under 1985	Succeeded by (Argentina) Patricia Tarabini
