= Mariaan de Swardt =

South African tennis player

- Country (sports): South Africa
- Residence: Houston, Texas, U.S.
- Born: 18 March 1971 (age 55) Johannesburg, South Africa
- Height: 1.77 m (5 ft 10 in)
- Turned pro: 1988
- Retired: 2001
- Plays: Right (one handed-backhand)
- Prize money: $1,127,365

Singles
- Career record: 204–136
- Career titles: 1
- Highest ranking: No. 28 (8 April 1996)

Grand Slam singles results
- Australian Open: 1R (1995, 1996, 1999)
- French Open: 3R (1999)
- Wimbledon: 4R (1995)
- US Open: 3R (1994)

Doubles
- Career record: 196–131
- Career titles: 4
- Highest ranking: No. 11 (19 October 1998)

Grand Slam doubles results
- Australian Open: 3R (1996, 1999)
- French Open: QF (1996)
- Wimbledon: F (1999)
- US Open: QF (1996)

Grand Slam mixed doubles results
- Australian Open: W (1999)
- French Open: W (2000)

Mariaan de Swardt (born 18 March 1971) is a former professional tennis player from South Africa, who was active from 1988 to 2001. She twice represented her native country at the Summer Olympics, in 1992 and 1996, and was a member of the South Africa Fed Cup team in 1992 and from 1994 to 1997. In 2006, de Swardt became a U.S. citizen.

De Swardt won two Grand Slam titles in mixed-doubles competition, the 1999 Australian Open and the 2000 French Open with partner David Adams. She also won four women's doubles titles and reached as high as world No. 11 in the doubles WTA rankings. She has one WTA Tour singles title from 1998 and reached a career-high singles ranking of world No. 28 in 1996.

Since retiring from tennis, she has been a commentator for Eurosport and South African television, and has coached at professional, collegiate and recreational level with her base being at Atlanta, Georgia. She resides in Houston, Texas, and is a teaching professional at The Houstonian Club. In 2004, she set up a non-profit charity, the Pet Care Fund, to help animals.

== Grand Slam tournament finals ==
=== Doubles: 1 (runner-up) ===
Result	Year	Championship	Surface	Partner	Opponents	Score
Loss	1999	Wimbledon	Grass	(Ukraine) Elena Tatarkova	(United States) Lindsay Davenport (United States) Corina Morariu	4–6, 4–6

=== Mixed doubles: 2 (titles) ===
Result	Year	Championship	Surface	Partner	Opponents	Score
Win	1999	Australian Open	Hard	(South Africa) David Adams	(Belarus) Max Mirnyi (United States) Serena Williams	6–4, 4–6, 7–6^{(5)}
Win	2000	French Open	Clay	(South Africa) David Adams	(Australia) Todd Woodbridge (Australia) Rennae Stubbs	6–3, 3–6, 6–3

== WTA Tour finals ==
=== Singles: 1 (1 title) ===
Legend (singles)
Tier I (0–0)
Tier II (0–0)
Tier III (1–0)
Tier IV & V (0–0)

Result	W-L	Date	Tournament	Tier	Surface	Opponent	Score
Win	1–0	Aug 1998	Boston Cup, US	Tier III	Hard	(Austria) Barbara Schett	3–6, 7–6^{(7–4)}, 7–5

=== Doubles: 9 (4 titles, 5 runner-ups) ===
Result	W-L	Date	Tournament	Tier	Surface	Partner	Opponents	Score
Loss	0–1	Apr 1995	Barcelona, Spain	Tier II	Clay	(Croatia) Iva Majoli	(Latvia) Larisa Savchenko (Spain) Arantxa Sánchez Vicario	5–7, 6–4, 5–7
Win	1–1	May 1995	Bournemouth, UK	Tier IV/V	Clay	(Romania) Ruxandra Dragomir	(Australia) Kerry-Anne Guse (Canada) Patricia Hy	6–3, 6–5
Loss	1–2	Feb 1996	Tokyo, Japan	Tier I	Carpet (i)	(Romania) Irina Spîrlea	(United States) Gigi Fernández (Belarus) Natasha Zvereva	6–7^{(7–9)}, 3–6
Win	2–2	May 1996	Welsh Open, UK	Tier IV/V	Clay	(United States) Katrina Adams	(Belgium) Els Callens (Belgium) Laurence Courtois	6–0, 6–4
Win	3–2	Jun 1998	Eastbourne, UK	Tier II	Grass	(Czech Republic) Jana Novotná	(Spain) Arantxa Sánchez Vicario (Belarus) Natasha Zvereva	6–1, 6–3
Loss	3–3	Aug 1998	Boston, US	Tier III	Hard	(United States) Mary Joe Fernández	(United States) Lisa Raymond (Australia) Rennae Stubbs	4–6, 4–6
Loss	3–4	Aug 1998	Connecticut, US	Tier II	Hard	(Czech Republic) Jana Novotná	(France) Alexandra Fusai (France) Nathalie Tauziat	1–6, 0–6
Loss	3–5	Oct 1998	Zurich, Switzerland	Tier I	Hard (i)	(Ukraine) Elena Tatarkova	(United States) Venus Williams (United States) Serena Williams	7–5, 1–6, 3–6
Win	4–5	Jan 1999	Hobart, Australia	Tier IV/V	Hard	(Ukraine) Elena Tatarkova	(France) Alexia Dechaume-Balleret (France) Émilie Loit	6–1, 6–2

== ITF Circuit finals ==
$100,000 tournaments
$75,000 tournaments
$50,000 tournaments
$25,000 tournaments
$10,000 tournaments

=== Singles (9–2) ===
Result	No.	Date	Tournament	Surface	Opponent	Score
Win	1.	1 December 1986	ITF Vereeniging, South Africa	Hard	(France) Marie-Christine Damas	6–2, 6–4
Win	2.	11 January 1988	ITF Vereeniging	Hard	(South Africa) Linda Barnard	6–2, 3–6, 6–4
Loss	1.	18 January 1988	ITF Pretoria, South Africa	Hard	(South Africa) Elna Reinach	3–6, 4–6
Loss	2.	20 November 1989	ITF Tel Aviv, Israel	Clay	(Israel) Yael Segal	3–6, 3–6
Win	3.	23 April 1990	ITF Ramat HaSharon, Israel	Hard	(Finland) Petra Thorén	6–1, 6–4
Win	4.	28 May 1990	ITF Francavilla, Italy	Clay	(Czechoslovakia) Zuzana Witzová	6–7, 7–6, 6–2
Win	5.	4 June 1990	ITF Mantua, Italy	Hard	(Italy) Federica Bonsignori	6–3, 6–7, 6–3
Win	6.	22 April 1991	ITF Ramat HaSharon, Israel	Hard	(Israel) Ilana Berger	6–3, 4–6, 6–2
Win	7.	6 May 1991	ITF Porto, Portugal	Clay	(Argentina) Inés Gorrochategui	6–1, 6–2
Win	8.	8 May 1994	ITF San Luis Potosí, Mexico	Hard	(United States) Michelle Jackson-Nobrega	6–3, 7–6
Win	9.	2 August 1998	ITF Salt Lake City, United States	Hard	(Puerto Rico) Kristina Brandi	6–2, 6–2

=== Doubles (7–3) ===
Result	No.	Date	Tournament	Surface	Partner	Opponents	Score
Win	1.	8 December 1986	ITF Johannesburg, South Africa	Hard	(South Africa) Linda Barnard	(United Kingdom) Valda Lake (United Kingdom) Katie Rickett	6–4, 7–6
Loss	2.	16 November 1987	ITF Johannesburg	Hard	(South Africa) Rene Mentz	(United States) Barbara Gerken (United States) Beth Herr	6–7, 2–6
Win	3.	14 December 1987	ITF Port Elizabeth, South Africa	Hard	(South Africa) Linda Barnard	(South Africa) Ralene Fourie (South Africa) Benita Haycock	6–4, 6–2
Win	4.	4 January 1988	ITF Johannesburg	Hard	(South Africa) Linda Barnard	(United States) Anne Grousbeck (United States) Vincenza Procacci	7–5, 6–2
Win	5.	11 January 1988	ITF Vereeniging, South Africa	Hard	(South Africa) Linda Barnard	(West Germany) Cora Linneman (United States) Margaret Redfearn	6–2, 7–5
Loss	6.	18 January 1988	ITF Pretoria, South Africa	Hard	(South Africa) Linda Barnard	(South Africa) Elna Reinach (South Africa) Dianne Van Rensburg	6–3, 4–6, 4–6
Loss	7.	6 May 1991	ITF Porto, Portugal	Clay	(Israel) Yael Segal	(Spain) Eva Bes (Spain) Virginia Ruano Pascual	3–6, 5–7
Win	8.	8 May 1994	ITF San Luis Potosí, Mexico	Hard	(United States) Liezel Huber	(United States) Michelle Jackson-Nobrega (Poland) Katarzyna Teodorowicz	4–6, 6–3, 6–4
Win	9.	4 August 1997	ITF Salt Lake City, United States	Hard	(United States) Debbie Graham	(Australia) Rachel McQuillan (Japan) Nana Smith	7–6, 7–5
Win	10.	2 August 1998	ITF Salt Lake City	Hard	(United Kingdom) Samantha Smith	(United States) Liezel Huber (Austria) Karin Kschwendt	6–2, 6–2

=== Head-to-head records ===
- Anna Kournikova 0-1
- Martina Hingis 0-1
- Lindsay Davenport 0-2
- Venus Williams 0-1
- Steffi Graf 1–2
- Anke Huber 2–2
- Monica Seles 0-2
- Dominique Monami 2-1
