= Barbara Schett career statistics =

Career finals
Discipline	Type	Won	Lost	Total
Singles	Grand Slam	–	–	–
Singles	Summer Olympics	–	–	–
Singles	WTA Finals (Note: Formerly known as: Virginia Slims Championships (until 1995); WTA Tour Championships (until 2014))	–	–	–
Singles	WTA 1000 (Note: Formerly known as: Category 4 & 5 & 6 (until 1990); Tier I (until 2009); WTA Premier Mandatory and 5 (until 2021))	0	1	1
Singles	WTA 500 (Note: Formerly known as: Category 3 (until 1990); Tier II (until 2009); WTA Premier (until 2021))	–	–	–
Singles	WTA 250 (Note: Formerly known as: Category 1 & 2 (until 1990); Tier III & IV & V (until 2009); WTA International (until 2021))	3	2	5
Singles	Total	3	3	6
Doubles	Grand Slam	–	–	–
Doubles	Summer Olympics	–	–	–
Doubles	WTA Finals	–	–	–
Doubles	WTA 1000	0	1	1
Doubles	WTA 500	5	2	7
Doubles	WTA 250	5	6	11
Doubles	Total	10	9	19
Mixed doubles	Grand Slam	0	1	1
Mixed doubles	Total	0	1	1
Total		13	13	26

This is a list of the main career statistics of Austrian professional tennis player Barbara Schett.

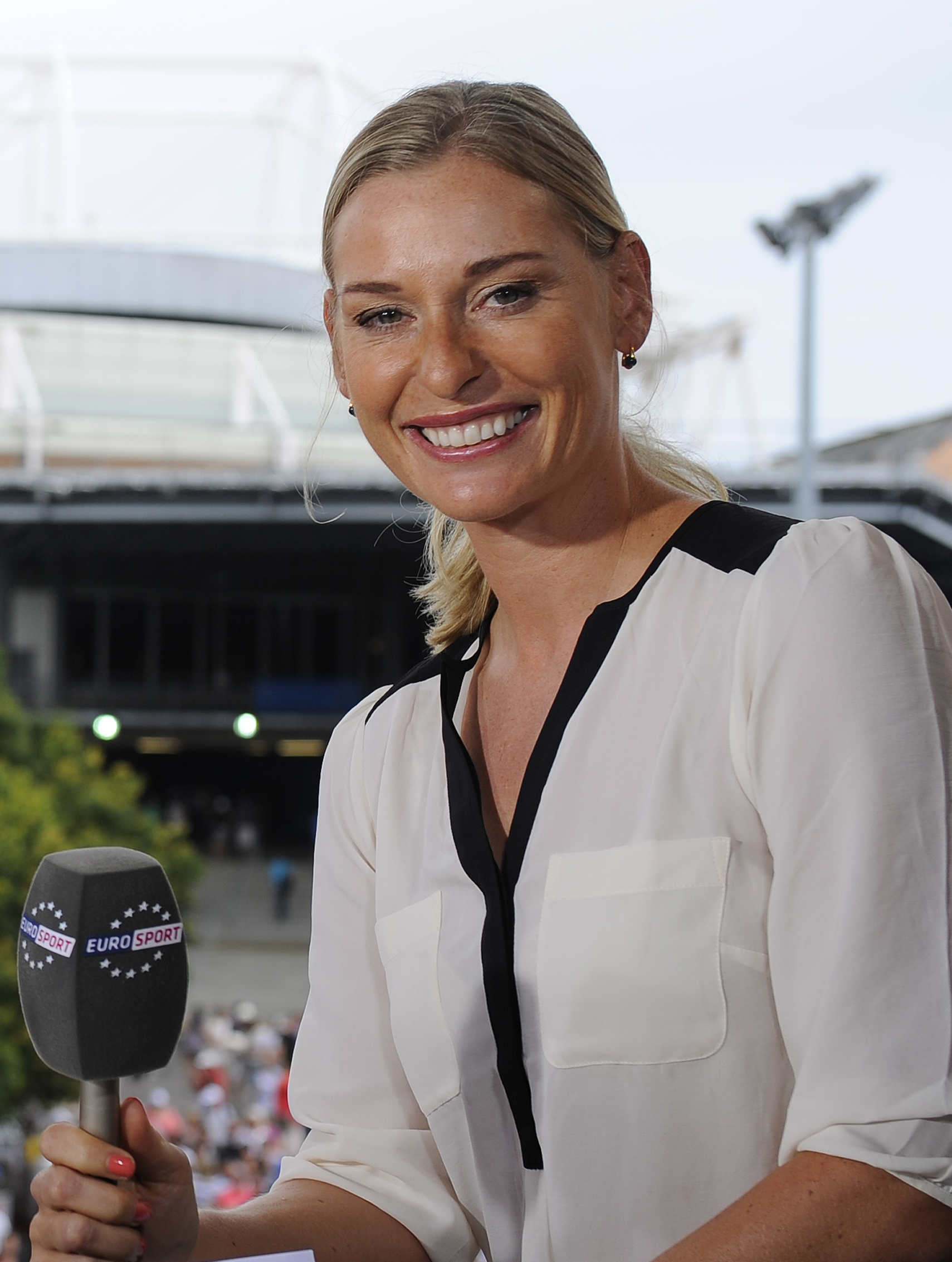
Schett in 2014

== Performance timeline ==
Key
W	F	SF	QF	#R	RR	Q#	P#	DNQ	A	Z#	PO	G	S	B	NMS	NTI	P	NH

(W) winner; (F) finalist; (SF) semifinalist; (QF) quarterfinalist; (#R) rounds 4, 3, 2, 1; (RR) round-robin stage; (Q#) qualification round; (P#) preliminary round; (DNQ) did not qualify; (A) absent; (Z#) Davis/Fed Cup Zonal Group (with number indication) or (PO) play-off; (G) gold, (S) silver or (B) bronze Olympic/Paralympic medal; (NMS) not a Masters tournament; (NTI) not a Tier I tournament; (P) postponed; (NH) not held; (SR) strike rate (events won / competed); (W–L) win–loss record.
To avoid confusion and double counting, these charts are updated at the conclusion of a tournament or when the player's participation has ended.

Only main-draw results in WTA Tour, Grand Slam tournaments, Billie Jean King Cup (Fed Cup), Hopman Cup and Olympic Games are included in win–loss records.

=== Singles ===
Tournament	1991	1992	1993	1994	1995	1996	1997	1998	1999	2000	2001	2002	2003	2004	2005	SR	W–L	Win%
Australian Open	A	A	A	Q2	1R	4R	3R	4R	4R	4R	3R	3R	1R	2R	2R	0 / 11	20–11	65%
French Open	A	A	A	1R	1R	1R	1R	1R	3R	4R	4R	2R	3R	1R	A	0 / 11	11–11	50%
Wimbledon	A	A	A	1R	A	2R	2R	2R	4R	1R	3R	2R	2R	1R	A	0 / 10	10–10	50%
US Open	A	A	A	1R	1R	2R	2R	3R	QF	2R	4R	2R	2R	1R	A	0 / 11	14–11	56%
Win–loss	0–0	0–0	0–0	0–3	0–3	5–4	4–4	6–4	12–4	7–4	10–4	5–4	4–4	1–4	1–1	0 / 43	55–43	56%
WTA 1000 + former^{†} tournaments
Indian Wells Open	NMS						1R	2R	1R	4R	4R	3R	1R	4R	A	0 / 8	9–8	53%
Miami Open	A	A	A	A	3R	2R	3R	2R	QF	2R	2R	3R	1R	1R	A	0 / 10	9–10	47%
Italian Open	A	A	A	A	A	3R	2R	2R	A	A	1R	2R	2R	1R	A	0 / 7	6–7	46%
Canadian Open	A	A	A	A	A	1R	A	1R	QF	1R	3R	QF	1R	A	A	0 / 7	8–7	53%
Pan Pacific Open^{†}	NMS		A	A	A	A	A	A	A	A	A	2R	A	A	A	0 / 1	1–1	50%
Charleston Open^{†}	A	A	A	A	A	A	3R	1R	3R	2R	A	A	1R	A	A	0 / 5	4–5	44%
Berlin Open^{†}	A	A	A	A	A	1R	2R	2R	QF	A	2R	2R	2R	2R	A	0 / 8	9–8	53%
Southern California Open^{†}	NMS													2R	A	0 / 1	1–1	50%
Kremlin Cup^{†}	NH/NMS						A	2R	F	QF	QF	Q1	A	A	A	0 / 4	8–4	67%
Zurich Open^{†}	NMS		A	A	A	2R	1R	QF	2R	SF	2R	A	A	A	A	0 / 6	8–6	57%
Win–loss								6–8										
Career statistics
Year-end ranking	758	233	136	100	83	38	38	23	8	23	21	40	79	88	N/A			

== Significant finals ==
=== Grand Slams ===
==== Mixed doubles: 1 runner-up ====
Result	Year	Tournament	Surface	Partner	Opponents	Score
Loss	2001	Australian Open	Hard	(Australia) Joshua Eagle	(United States) Corina Morariu (South Africa) Ellis Ferreira	1–6, 3–6

=== WTA 1000 ===
==== Singles: 1 runner-up ====
Result	Year	Tournament	Surface	Opponent	Score
Loss	1999	Kremlin Cup	Carpet (i)	(France) Nathalie Tauziat	6–2, 4–6, 1–6

==== Doubles: 1 runner-up ====
Result	Year	Tournament	Surface	Partner	Opponents	Score
Loss	1999	Charleston Open	Clay	(Switzerland) Patty Schnyder	(Czech Republic) Jana Novotná (Russia) Elena Likhovtseva	1–6, 4–6

== WTA Tour finals ==
=== Singles: 6 (3 titles, 3 runners-up) ===
Legend
WTA 1000 (Tier I) (0–1)
WTA 250 (Tier III / Tier IV) (3–2)

Result	W–L	Date	Tournament	Tier	Surface	Opponent	Score
Win	1–0	Jul 1996	Palermo International, Italy	Tier IV	Clay	(Germany) Sabine Hack	6–3, 6–3
Win	2–0	Aug 1997	Austrian Open, Austria	Tier IV	Clay	(Slovakia) Henrieta Nagyová	3–6, 6–2, 6–3
Loss	2–1	Jul 1998	Palermo International, Italy	Tier IV	Clay	(Switzerland) Patty Schnyder	1–6, 7–5, 2–6
Loss	2–2	Aug 1998	Boston Cup, United States	Tier III	Hard	(South Africa) Mariaan de Swardt	6–3, 6–7^{(4–7)}, 5–7
Loss	2–3	Oct 1999	Kremlin Cup, Russia	Tier I	Carpet (i)	(France) Nathalie Tauziat	6–2, 4–6, 1–6
Win	3–3	Jul 2000	Austrian Open, Austria (2)	Tier III	Clay	(Switzerland) Patty Schnyder	5–7, 6–4, 6–4

=== Doubles: 19 (10 titles, 9 runner-ups) ===
Legend WTA 1000 (0–1) WTA 500 (Tier II) (5–2) WTA 250 (Tier IV / Tier IVb / Tier V) (5–6)	Finals by surface Hard (3–4) Clay (5–4) Carpet (2–1)

Result	W–L	Date	Tournament	Tier	Surface	Partner	Opponent	Score
Win	1–0	Jul 1996	Palermo International, Italy	Tier IV	Clay	(Slovakia) Janette Husárová	(Argentina) Florencia Labat (Germany) Barbara Rittner	6–1, 6–2
Loss	1–1	Nov 1996	Kremlin Cup, Russia	Tier III	Carpet	(Italy) Silvia Farina Elia	(Ukraine) Natalia Medvedeva (Latvia) Larisa Savchenko	6–7^{(5–7)}, 6–4, 1–6
Win	2–1	Jul 1997	Palermo International, Italy (2)	Tier IV	Clay	(Italy) Silvia Farina Elia	(Argentina) Florencia Labat (Argentina) Mercedes Paz	2–6, 6–1, 6–4
Loss	2–2	Apr 1998	Amelia Island Championships, United States	Tier II	Clay	(Switzerland) Patty Schnyder	(United States) Sandra Cacic (France) Mary Pierce	6–7, 6–4, 6–7
Win	3–2	May 1998	Hamburg Open, Germany	Tier II	Clay	(Switzerland) Patty Schnyder	(Switzerland) Martina Hingis (Czech Republic) Jana Novotná	7–6^{(7–3)}, 3–6, 6–3
Loss	3–3	Jul 1998	Palermo International, Italy	Tier IV	Clay	(Switzerland) Patty Schnyder	(Bulgaria) Pavlina Nola (Germany) Elena Wagner	4–6, 2–6
Win	4–3	Jan 1999	Auckland Open, New Zealand	Tier IVb	Hard	(Italy) Silvia Farina Elia	(Netherlands) Seda Noorlander (Germany) Marlene Weingärtner	6–2, 7–6^{(7–2)}
Loss	4–4	Apr 1999	Charleston Open, United States	Tier I	Clay	(Switzerland) Patty Schnyder	(Czech Republic) Jana Novotná (Russia) Elena Likhovtseva	1–6, 4–6
Loss	4–5	Jul 2000	Austrian Open, Austria	Tier III	Clay	(Switzerland) Patty Schnyder	(Argentina) Laura Montalvo (Argentina) Paola Suárez	6–7^{(5–7)}, 1–6
Loss	4–6	Oct 2000	Stuttgart Open, Germany	Tier II	Hard	(Spain) Arantxa Sánchez Vicario	(Switzerland) Martina Hingis (Russia) Anna Kournikova	4–6, 2–6
Loss	4–7	Jan 2001	Auckland Open, New Zealand	Tier V	Hard	(Switzerland) Emmanuelle Gagliardi	(France) Alexandra Fusai (Italy) Rita Grande	6–7^{(4–7)}, 3–6
Win	5–7	Jan 2001	Sydney International, Australia	Tier II	Hard	(Russia) Anna Kournikova	(United States) Lisa Raymond (Australia) Rennae Stubbs	6–2, 7–5
Win	6–7	May 2002	Hamburg Open, Germany (2)	Tier II	Clay	(Switzerland) Martina Hingis	(Slovakia) Daniela Hantuchová (Spain) Arantxa Sánchez-Vicario	6–1, 6–1
Loss	6–8	Jan 2003	Hobart International, Australia	Tier V	Hard	(Austria) Patricia Wartusch	(Zimbabwe) Cara Black (Russia) Elena Likhovtseva	5–7, 6–7^{(1-7)}
Win	7–8	Feb 2003	Open GDF Suez, France	Tier II	Carpet (i)	(Switzerland) Patty Schnyder	(France) Marion Bartoli (France) Stéphanie Cohen-Aloro	2–6, 6–2, 7–6^{(7–5)}
Loss	7–9	Jan 2004	Hobart International, Australia	Tier V	Hard	(Belgium) Els Callens	(Japan) Shinobu Asagoe (Japan) Seiko Okamoto	6–2, 4–6, 3–6
Win	8–9	Feb 2004	Open GDF Suez, France (2)	Tier II	Carpet (i)	(Switzerland) Patty Schnyder	(Italy) Silvia Farina Elia (Italy) Francesca Schiavone	6–3, 6–2
Win	9–9	May 2004	Budapest Grand Prix, Hungary	Tier V	Clay	(Hungary) Petra Mandula	(Hungary) Virág Németh (Hungary) Ágnes Szávay	6–3, 6–2
Win	10–9	Aug 2004	Nordic Light Open, Sweden	Tier IV	Hard	(Australia) Alicia Molik	(Switzerland) Emmanuelle Gagliardi (Germany) Anna-Lena Grönefeld	6–3, 6–3

== ITF Circuit finals ==
=== Singles: 2 (1 title, 1 runner-up) ===
Legend
$10,000 tournaments

Result	W–L	Date	Tournament	Tier	Surface	Opponent	Score
Win	1–0	Mar 1992	ITF Zaragoza, Spain	10,000	Clay	(Spain) Eva Jiménez	6–4, 6–4
Loss	1–1	Aug 1992	ITF Paderborn, Germany	10,000	Clay	(Germany) Svenja Truelsen	4–6, 6–3, 6–7^{(7–9)}

== Top 10 wins ==
Season	1996	1997	1998	1999	2000	2001	2002	Total
Wins	1	1	3	5	1	2	1	14

#	Player	vsRank	Event	Surface	Round	Score
1996
1.	(Bulgaria) Magdalena Maleeva	8	Amelia Island Championships, United States	Clay	2R	6–1, 6–3
1997
2.	(Germany) Anke Huber	8	Hamburg Open, Germany	Clay	2R	6–4, 7–6
1998
3.	(Croatia) Iva Majoli	9	Hamburg Open, Germany	Clay	2R	7–5, 6–2
4.	(South Africa) Amanda Coetzer	8	Boston Cup, United States	Hard	QF	6–7, 6–4, 6–1
5.	(Switzerland) Patty Schnyder	10	Zurich Open, Switzerland	Hard (i)	2R	6–4, 1–6, 7–6
1999
6.	(Spain) Conchita Martínez	9	Sydney International, Australia	Hard	2R	6–3, 7–6^{(9–7)}
7.	(Spain) Arantxa Sánchez Vicario	4	Sydney International, Australia	Hard	QF	1–6, 6–1, 6–0
8.	(Spain) Arantxa Sánchez Vicario	5	Australian Open, Australia	Hard	2R	6–2, 6–2
9.	(Czech Republic) Jana Novotná	4	Hamburg Open, Germany	Clay	QF	6–4, 6–3
10.	(France) Nathalie Tauziat	9	Berlin Open, Germany	Clay	3R	6–1, 4–6, 7–6^{(7-5)}
2000
11.	(France) Nathalie Tauziat	7	Zurich Open, Switzerland	Carpet (i)	QF	3–6, 6–3, 6–3
2001
12.	(United States) Venus Williams	2	French Open, France	Clay	1R	6–4, 6–4
13.	(Belgium) Justine Henin	8	Kremlin Cup, Russia	Carpet (i)	2R	5–7, 7–6^{(8–6)}, 6–2
2002
14.	(Belgium) Kim Clijsters	7	Canadian Open, Canada	Hard	3R	6–4, 6–4
