= 1999 Torneo Internazionali Femminili di Palermo – Singles =

Singles
- 1999 Torneo Internazionali Femminili di Palermo

Final
- Champion: (Russia) Anastasia Myskina
- Runner-up: (Spain) Ángeles Montolio
- Score: 3–6, 7–6^{(7–3)}, 6–2

Details
- Draw: 32
- Seeds: 8

Events
Singles	Doubles
← 1998 ·	Torneo Internazionali Femminili di Palermo	· 2000 →

The 1999 Torneo Internazionali Femminili di Palermo singles was the singles event of the twelfth edition of the second most prestigious women's tennis tournament held in Italy. Patty Schnyder was the defending champion, but she did not compete this year.

Qualifier and World No. 196 Anastasia Myskina won in the final, 3–6, 7–6^{(7–3)}, 6–2, against Ángeles Montolio, to win her first WTA title.

== Seeds ==
1. (France) Sarah Pitkowski (quarterfinals)
2. (Spain) Magüi Serna (first round)
3. (Spain) Virginia Ruano Pascual (first round)
4. (Switzerland) Emmanuelle Gagliardi (first round)
5. (Slovenia) Katarina Srebotnik (semifinals)
6. (Germany) Elena Wagner (first round)
7. (Belgium) Laurence Courtois (quarterfinals)
8. (Netherlands) Miriam Oremans (first round)

== Draw ==
=== Key ===
- Q = Qualifier
- WC = Wild card
- LL = Lucky loser
- Alt = Alternate
- SE = Special exempt
- PR = Protected ranking
- ITF = ITF entry
- JE = Junior exempt
- w/o = Walkover
- r = Retired
- d = Defaulted
- SR = Special ranking

=== Finals ===
Semifinals
(Russia) Elena Dementieva	6	3	2
Q	(Russia) Anastasia Myskina	3	6	6
5	(Slovenia) Katarina Srebotnik	2	6	2
(Spain) Ángeles Montolio	6	4	6

Final
Q	(Russia) Anastasia Myskina	3	7^{7}	6
(Spain) Ángeles Montolio	6	6^{3}	2

=== Top half ===
First round
1	(France) S Pitkowski	6	6
(France) A Fusai	2	1
(Netherlands) K Boogert	1	4
(Italy) A Serra Zanetti	6	6
(Russia) E Dementieva	6	6
(Austria) P Wartusch	1	2
LL	(United States) S Reeves	6	5	6
6	(Germany) E Wagner	3	7	3
4	(Switzerland) E Gagliardi	5	3
(Hungary) R Kuti-Kis	7	6
Q	(Switzerland) M Vavrinec	6	7
(Germany) P Begerow	3	5
(China) F Li	3	1
(Bulgaria) L Bacheva	6	6
Q	(Russia) A Myskina	7^{7}	6
8	(Netherlands) M Oremans	6^{5}	3

Second round
1	(France) S Pitkowski	6	6
(Italy) A Serra Zanetti	4	1
(Russia) E Dementieva	6	6
LL	(United States) S Reeves	3	3
(Hungary) R Kuti-Kis	7	6
Q	(Switzerland) M Vavrinec	5	3
(Bulgaria) L Bacheva	1	0
Q	(Russia) A Myskina	6	6

Quarterfinals
1	(France) S Pitkowski	4	2
(Russia) E Dementieva	6	6
(Hungary) R Kuti-Kis	2	4
Q	(Russia) A Myskina	6	6

Semifinals
(Russia) E Dementieva	6	3	2
Q	(Russia) A Myskina	3	6	6

=== Bottom half ===
First round
5	(Slovenia) K Srebotnik	6	6
(Italy) L Golarsa	1	2
(Italy) T Garbin	2^{r}
Q	(Italy) A Canepa	5
Q	(Italy) G Casoni	6	6
LL	(Belgium) P Van Acker	4	2
(Netherlands) S Noorlander	3	7	6
3	(Spain) V Ruano Pascual	6	5	2
7	(Belgium) L Courtois	7^{7}	7
WC	(Italy) MP Zavagli	6^{4}	5
(Argentina) M Díaz Oliva	6^{2}	6	6
(South Africa) J Kruger	7^{7}	4	4
(Spain) Á Montolio	6	6
WC	(Italy) F Perfetti	4	1
(Sweden) Å Carlsson	6^{3}	6	6
2	(Spain) M Serna	7^{7}	3	4

Second round
5	(Slovenia) K Srebotnik	6	6
Q	(Italy) A Canepa	2	4
Q	(Italy) G Casoni	6	7
(Netherlands) S Noorlander	3	5
7	(Belgium) L Courtois	2	6	7
(Argentina) M Díaz Oliva	6	2	5
(Spain) Á Montolio	6	4	7
(Sweden) Å Carlsson	4	6	5

Quarterfinals
5	(Slovenia) K Srebotnik	7	3	6
Q	(Italy) G Casoni	5	6	2
7	(Belgium) L Courtois	4	4
(Spain) Á Montolio	6	6

Semifinals
5	(Slovenia) K Srebotnik	2	6	2
(Spain) Á Montolio	6	4	6

== Qualifying ==
=== Seeds ===
1. (Switzerland) Miroslava Vavrinec (qualifier)
2. (United States) Samantha Reeves (qualifying competition, lucky loser)
3. (Romania) Andreea Vanc (second round)
4. (Paraguay) Larissa Schaerer (second round)
5. (Belgium) Patty Van Acker (qualifying competition, lucky loser)
6. (France) Lea Ghirardi (first round)
7. (Hungary) Katalin Marosi (first round)
8. (Italy) Germana Di Natale (first round)

=== Qualifiers ===
1. (Switzerland) Miroslava Vavrinec
2. (Italy) Alice Canepa
3. (Russia) Anastasia Myskina
4. (Italy) Giulia Casoni

=== Lucky losers ===
1. (United States) Samantha Reeves
2. (Belgium) Patty Van Acker

== Qualifying draw ==
=== Key ===
- Q = Qualifier
- WC = Wild card
- LL = Lucky loser
- Alt = Alternate
- SE = Special exempt
- PR = Protected ranking
- ITF = ITF entry
- JE = Junior exempt
- w/o = Walkover
- r = Retired
- d = Defaulted
- SR = Special ranking

=== First qualifier ===
First round
1	(Switzerland) Miroslava Vavrinec	6	6
(Argentina) María José Gaidano	2	4
(Morocco) Bahia Mouhtassine	2	6	7
(Germany) Adriana Barna	6	2	5
(Japan) Maiko Inoue	6	3	6
WC	(Germany) Caroline Schneider	3	6	3
(France) Camille Pin	w/o
7	(Hungary) Katalin Marosi

Second round
1	(Switzerland) Miroslava Vavrinec	7	6
(Morocco) Bahia Mouhtassine	5	4
(Japan) Maiko Inoue	6^{3}	4
(France) Camille Pin	7^{7}	6

Qualifying competition
1	(Switzerland) Miroslava Vavrinec	6	2	6
(France) Camille Pin	0	6	3

=== Second qualifier ===
First round
4	(Paraguay) Larissa Schaerer	6	6
WC	(Federal Republic of Yugoslavia) Branka Bojović	0	0
(Italy) Alice Canepa	6	6
(Thailand) Benjamas Sangaram	1	3
(Japan) Keiko Nagatomi	6	4	6
(Germany) Nina Nittinger	1	6	1
(Argentina) María Fernanda Landa	2	2^{r}
5	(Belgium) Patty Van Acker	6	4

Second round
4	(Paraguay) Larissa Schaerer	2	5
(Italy) Alice Canepa	6	7
(Japan) Keiko Nagatomi	3	4
5	(Belgium) Patty Van Acker	6	6

Qualifying competition
(Italy) Alice Canepa	2	6	6
5	(Belgium) Patty Van Acker	6	4	4

=== Third qualifier ===
First round
6	(France) Lea Ghirardi	2	6	4
(Australia) Mireille Dittmann	6	3	6
(Russia) Anastasia Myskina	6	6
(Italy) Laura Dell'Angelo	2	3
(Austria) Sandra Dopfer	1	4
(Bulgaria) Desislava Topalova	6	6
WC	(Italy) Silvia Schiavetti	2	0
3	(Romania) Andreea Vanc	6	6

Second round
(Australia) Mireille Dittmann	3	3
(Russia) Anastasia Myskina	6	6
(Bulgaria) Desislava Topalova	6	6
3	(Romania) Andreea Vanc	2	3

Qualifying competition
(Russia) Anastasia Myskina	6	6
(Bulgaria) Desislava Topalova	1	0

=== Fourth qualifier ===
First round
8	(Italy) Germana Di Natale	6	5	6
(Russia) Maria Goloviznina	4	7	3
(Italy) Valentina Sassi	5	1
(Italy) Giulia Casoni	7	6
(Italy) Flavia Pennetta	6	6
WC	(Italy) Clelia Anfuso	3	3
(France) Sophie Lefèvre	6	3	2
2	(United States) Samantha Reeves	2	6	6

Second round
8	(Italy) Germana Di Natale	2^{r}
(Italy) Giulia Casoni	5
(Italy) Flavia Pennetta	5	6	2
2	(United States) Samantha Reeves	7	2	6

Qualifying competition
(Italy) Giulia Casoni	7^{7}	6
2	(United States) Samantha Reeves	6^{4}	4
