= 1999 Torneo Internazionali Femminili di Palermo – Doubles =

Doubles
- 1999 Torneo Internazionali Femminili di Palermo

Final
- Champions: (Slovenia) Tina Križan (Slovenia) Katarina Srebotnik
- Runners-up: (Sweden) Åsa Carlsson (Canada) Sonya Jeyaseelan
- Score: 4–6, 6–3, 6–0

Details
- Draw: 16
- Seeds: 4

Events
Singles	Doubles
← 1998 ·	Torneo Internazionali Femminili di Palermo	· 2000 →

The 1999 Internazionali Femminili di Palermo doubles was the doubles event of the twelfth edition of the second most prestigious women's tennis tournament held in Italy. Pavlina Stoyanova and Elena Wagner were the defending champions, but Stoyanova did not compete this year. Wagner partnered with Laurence Courtois as the third seed, and was defeated in the semifinals by second seeds Tina Križan and Katarina Srebotnik.

Križan and Srebotnik then ended up winning the tournament by defeating Åsa Carlsson and Sonya Jeyaseelan in the final.

== Seeds ==
1. (France) Alexandra Fusai / (Spain) Virginia Ruano Pascual (quarterfinals)
2. (Slovenia) Tina Križan / (Slovenia) Katarina Srebotnik (champions)
3. (Belgium) Laurence Courtois / (Germany) Elena Wagner (semifinals)
4. (Sweden) Åsa Carlsson / (Canada) Sonya Jeyaseelan (final)

== Draw ==
=== Key ===
- Q = Qualifier
- WC = Wild card
- LL = Lucky loser
- Alt = Alternate
- SE = Special exempt
- PR = Protected ranking
- ITF = ITF entry
- JE = Junior exempt
- w/o = Walkover
- r = Retired
- d = Defaulted
- SR = Special ranking

First round
1	(France) A Fusai (Spain) V Ruano Pascual	6	6
(Thailand) B Sangaram (Romania) A Vanc	2	1
(Italy) G Casoni (Italy) M P Zavagli	6	6
(Japan) M Inoue (Japan) K Nagatomi	3	3
4	(Sweden) Å Carlsson (Canada) S Jeyaseelan	7	6
(Italy) L Golarsa (Argentina) M-F Landa	5	3
WC	(Italy) F Pennetta (Italy) A Serra Zanetti	3	6	6
(Germany) A Barna (Germany) C Schneider	6	0	1
Q	(South Africa) J Kruger (China) F Li	6	6
(Argentina) MJ Gaidano (Paraguay) L Schaerer	3	1
LL	(Germany) N Nittinger (Spain) M Serna	3	1
3	(Belgium) L Courtois (Germany) E Wagner	6	6
(Netherlands) K Boogert (Netherlands) M Oremans	w/o
(Switzerland) E Gagliardi (United States) S Reeves
(Bulgaria) L Bacheva (Austria) P Wartusch	6^{6}	2
2	(Slovenia) T Križan (Slovenia) K Srebotnik	7^{8}	6

Quarterfinals
1	(France) A Fusai (Spain) V Ruano Pascual	6	3	4
(Italy) G Casoni (Italy) M P Zavagli	3	6	6
4	(Sweden) Å Carlsson (Canada) S Jeyaseelan	4	6	6
WC	(Italy) F Pennetta (Italy) A Serra Zanetti	6	2	2
Q	(South Africa) J Kruger (China) F Li	6^{5}	3
3	(Belgium) L Courtois (Germany) E Wagner	7^{7}	6
(Netherlands) K Boogert (Netherlands) M Oremans	3	2
2	(Slovenia) T Križan (Slovenia) K Srebotnik	6	6

Semifinals
(Italy) G Casoni (Italy) M P Zavagli	3	4
4	(Sweden) Å Carlsson (Canada) S Jeyaseelan	6	6
3	(Belgium) L Courtois (Germany) E Wagner	3	6	3
2	(Slovenia) T Križan (Slovenia) K Srebotnik	6	2	6

Final
4	(Sweden) Å Carlsson (Canada) S Jeyaseelan	6	3	0
2	(Slovenia) T Križan (Slovenia) K Srebotnik	4	6	6

== Qualifying ==
=== Seeds ===
1. (Russia) Maria Goloviznina / (Russia) Anastasia Myskina (first round)
2. (Germany) Nina Nittinger / (Spain) Magüi Serna (qualifying competition, lucky loser)

=== Qualifiers ===
1. (South Africa) Joannette Kruger / (China) Li Fang

=== Lucky losers ===
1. (Germany) Nina Nittinger / (Spain) Magüi Serna

== Qualifying draw ==
=== Key ===
- Q = Qualifier
- WC = Wild card
- LL = Lucky loser
- Alt = Alternate
- SE = Special exempt
- PR = Protected ranking
- ITF = ITF entry
- JE = Junior exempt
- w/o = Walkover
- r = Retired
- d = Defaulted
- SR = Special ranking

First round
1	(Russia) Maria Goloviznina (Russia) Anastasia Myskina	5
(South Africa) Joannette Kruger (China) Li Fang	8
(Germany) Petra Begerow (Austria) Sandra Dopfer	1
2	(Germany) Nina Nittinger (Spain) Magüi Serna	8

Qualifying competition
(South Africa) Joannette Kruger (China) Li Fang	8
2	(Germany) Nina Nittinger (Spain) Magüi Serna	4
