= 1999 Torneo Internazionali Femminili di Palermo =

- Date: 12–18 July
- Edition: 12th
- Category: Tier IV Series
- Draw: 32S / 16D
- Prize money: $142,500
- Surface: Clay / outdoor
- Location: Palermo, Italy

Champions

Singles
- (Russia) Anastasia Myskina

Doubles
- (Slovenia) Tina Križan / (Slovenia) Katarina Srebotnik
← 1998 ·	Torneo Internazionali Femminili di Palermo	· 2000 →

The 1999 Torneo Internazionali Femminili di Palermo was a women's tennis tournament played on outdoor clay courts in Palermo, Italy that was part of the Tier IV Series of the 1999 WTA Tour. It was the 12th edition of the Internazionali Femminili di Palermo and took place from 12 July until 18 July 1999. Qualifier Anastasia Myskina won the singles title.

== Finals ==
=== Singles ===
(Russia) Anastasia Myskina defeated (Spain) Ángeles Montolio, 3–6, 7–6^{(7–3)}, 6–2

- It was Myskina's first WTA final and career title.

=== Doubles ===
(Slovenia) Tina Križan / (Slovenia) Katarina Srebotnik defeated (Italy) Giulia Casoni / (Italy) Maria Paola Zavagli, 4–6, 6–3, 6–0

== Entrants ==
=== Seeds ===
Country	Player	Rank	Seed
FRA	Sarah Pitkowski	35	1
ESP	Magüi Serna	38	2
ESP	Virginia Ruano Pascual	64	3
SUI	Emmanuelle Gagliardi	65	4
SLO	Katarina Srebotnik	68	5
GER	Elena Wagner	74	6
BEL	Laurence Courtois	76	7
NED	Miriam Oremans	75	8

=== Other entrants ===
The following players received wildcards into the singles main draw:

- (Italy) Maria Paola Zavagli
- (Italy) Flora Perfetti

The following players received wildcards into the doubles main draw:

- (Italy) Flavia Pennetta / (Italy) Adriana Serra Zanetti

The following players received entry from the singles qualifying draw:

- (Switzerland) Miroslava Vavrinec
- (Russia) Anastasia Myskina
- (Italy) Alice Canepa
- (Italy) Giulia Casoni

The following players received entry to the singles main drawn as a lucky loser:

- (United States) Samantha Reeves
- (Belgium) Patty Van Acker

The following players received entry from the doubles qualifying draw:

- (South Africa) Joannette Kruger / (China) Li Fang

The following players received entry to the doubles main draw as a lucky loser:

- (Germany) Nina Nittinger / (Spain) Magüi Serna
