= 1997 Internazionali Femminili di Palermo =

- Date: 14–20 July
- Edition: 10th
- Category: Tier IV
- Draw: 32S / 16D
- Prize money: $163,000
- Surface: Clay / outdoor
- Location: Palermo, Italy

Champions

Singles
- (France) Sandrine Testud

Doubles
- (Italy) Silvia Farina / (Austria) Barbara Schett
← 1996 ·	Internazionali Femminili di Palermo	· 1998 →

The 1997 Internazionali Femminili di Palermo was a women's tennis tournament played on outdoor clay courts in Palermo, Italy that was part of the Tier IV category of the 1997 WTA Tour. It was the tenth edition of the tournament and was held from 14 July until 20 July 1997. Second-seeded Sandrine Testud won the singles title.

== Finals ==
=== Singles ===
(France) Sandrine Testud defeated (Russia) Elena Makarova 7–5, 6–3

- It was Testud's only singles title of the year and the 1st of her career.

=== Doubles ===
(Italy) Silvia Farina / (Austria) Barbara Schett defeated (Argentina) Florencia Labat / (Argentina) Mercedes Paz 2–6, 6–1, 6–4

- It was Farina's only doubles title of the year and the 2nd of her career. It was Schett's only doubles title of the year and the 2nd of her career.
