= 1997 Internazionali Femminili di Palermo – Singles =

Singles
- 1997 Internazionali Femminili di Palermo
- 1996 Champion: (Austria) Barbara Schett

Final
- Champion: (France) Sandrine Testud
- Runner-up: (Russia) Elena Makarova
- Score: 7–5, 6–3

Details
- Draw: 32
- Seeds: 8

Events
Singles	Doubles
← 1996 ·	Internazionali Femminili di Palermo	· 1998 →

Barbara Schett was the defending champion but lost in the semifinals to Sandrine Testud.

Testud won in the final 7–5, 6–3 against Elena Makarova.

== Seeds ==
A champion seed is indicated in bold text while text in italics indicates the round in which that seed was eliminated.

1. (Austria) Barbara Paulus (semifinals)
2. (France) **Sandrine Testud (champion)**
3. (Austria) Barbara Schett (semifinals)
4. (Argentina) Florencia Labat (second round)
5. (Italy) Silvia Farina (quarterfinals)
6. (Spain) Virginia Ruano-Pascual (quarterfinals)
7. (Italy) Francesca Lubiani (first round)
8. (Italy) Flora Perfetti (first round)

== Draw ==
=== Key ===
- Q = Qualifier
- WC = Wild card
- LL = Lucky loser
- Alt = Alternate
- ITF = ITF entry
- PR = Protected ranking
- SR = Special ranking
- SE = Special exempt
- JE = Junior exempt
- JR = Junior Accelerator Programme entrant
- CO = College Accelerator Programme entrant
- NG = Next Gen Accelerator Program entrant
- w/o = Walkover
- r = Retired
- d = Defaulted

First round
1	(Austria) **B Paulus**	**7**	**2**
(Austria) S Dopfer	5	1	r
(Argentina) M-J Gaidano	4	3
(Italy) **S Cecchini**	**6**	**6**
(Germany) **P Begerow**	**6**	4	**6**
Q	(France) L Ghirardi	4	**6**	2
(Argentina) **I Gorrochategui**	**6**	**7**
7	(Italy) F Lubiani	4	5
4	(Argentina) **F Labat**	3	**6**	**6**
LL	(Colombia) F Zuluaga	**6**	2	0
WC	(Sweden) K Triska	3	2
(Russia) **E Makarova**	**6**	**6**
(Belgium) **S Devillé**	**6**	**7**
Q	(Italy) L Dell'Angelo	2	6
(Germany) E Wagner	**6**	4	2
5	(Italy) **S Farina**	2	**6**	**6**
6	(Spain) **V Ruano-Pascual**	**7**	**6**
(Czech Republic) L Němečková	6	3
(Italy) **G Pizzichini**	**7**	**6**
Q	(Germany) A Barna	6	3
(France) **N van Lottum**	**6**	**6**
(Germany) M Kochta	0	3
Q	(Germany) S Meier	1	0	r
3	(Austria) **B Schett**	**6**	**1**
8	(Italy) F Perfetti	0	3
(Switzerland) **E Gagliardi**	**6**	**6**
(Russia) T Panova	2	4
(Mexico) **A Gavaldón**	**6**	**6**
WC	(Italy) **L Garrone**	6	**6**	**6**
(Czech Republic) L Cenková	**7**	2	4
(Austria) K Kschwendt	2	2
2	(France) **S Testud**	**6**	**6**

Second round
1	(Austria) **B Paulus**	**6**	**6**
(Italy) S Cecchini	1	4
(Germany) P Begerow	**6**	4	1
(Argentina) **I Gorrochategui**	2	**6**	**6**
4	(Argentina) F Labat	2	**6**	1
(Russia) **E Makarova**	**6**	4	**6**
(Belgium) S Devillé	5	3
5	(Italy) **S Farina**	**7**	**6**
6	(Spain) **V Ruano-Pascual**	**6**	**6**
(Italy) G Pizzichini	4	4
(France) N van Lottum	1	3
3	(Austria) **B Schett**	**6**	**6**
(Switzerland) **E Gagliardi**	**6**	**6**
(Mexico) A Gavaldón	2	1
WC	(Italy) L Garrone	**6**	4	2
2	(France) **S Testud**	1	**6**	**6**

Quarterfinals
1	(Austria) **B Paulus**	2	**6**	**6**
(Argentina) I Gorrochategui	**6**	3	2
(Russia) **E Makarova**	**7**	**7**
5	(Italy) S Farina	5	6
6	(Spain) V Ruano-Pascual	3	**7**	6
3	(Austria) **B Schett**	**6**	5	**7**
(Switzerland) E Gagliardi	**7**	2	3
2	(France) **S Testud**	6	**6**	**6**

Semifinals
1	(Austria) B Paulus	4	5
(Russia) **E Makarova**	**6**	**7**
3	(Austria) B Schett	**6**	3	6
2	(France) **S Testud**	0	**6**	**7**

Final
(Russia) Elena Makarova	5	3
2	(France) **Sandrine Testud**	**7**	**6**
