= 1997 WTA Tour =

Women's tennis circuit

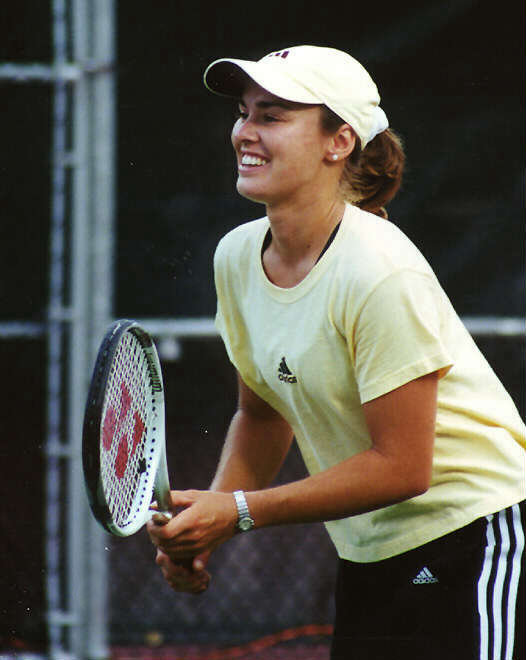
- Martina Hingis finished the year as world No. 1 for the first time in her career, becoming the youngest woman to do so. She won twelve tournaments during the season, including three majors at the Australian Open, the Wimbledon Championships, and the US Open. She also won three Tier I events and finished runner-up at the fourth major, the French Open.

Details
- Duration: December 30, 1996 – November 24, 1997
- Edition: 27th
- Tournaments: 51
- Categories: Grand Slam (4); WTA Championships; WTA Tier I (9); WTA Tier II (15); WTA Tier III (11); WTA Tier IV (11)

Achievements (singles)
- Most titles: (Switzerland) Martina Hingis (12)
- Most finals: (Switzerland) Martina Hingis (13)
- Prize money leader: (Switzerland) Martina Hingis (US$3,400,196)
- Points leader: (Switzerland) Martina Hingis (6,264)

Awards
- Player of the year: (Switzerland) Martina Hingis
- Doubles team of the year: (United States) Gigi Fernández (Belarus) Natasha Zvereva
- Most improved player of the year: (South Africa) Amanda Coetzer
- Newcomer of the year: (United States) Venus Williams
- Comeback player of the year: (France) Mary Pierce

The WTA Tour is the elite tour for professional women's tennis organised by the Women's Tennis Association (WTA). The WTA Tour includes the four Grand Slam tournaments, the WTA Tour Championships and the WTA Tier I, Tier II, Tier III and Tier IV events. ITF tournaments are not part of the WTA Tour, although they award points for the WTA World Ranking.

== Schedule ==
The table below shows the 1997 WTA Tour schedule.

Key

Grand Slam events
Year-end championships
WTA Tier I tournaments
WTA Tier II events
WTA Tier III events
WTA Tier IV events
Team events

=== January ===
Week	Tournament	Champions	Runners-up	Semifinalists	Quarterfinalists
30 Dec	Hyundai Hopman Cup; Perth, Australia; ITF Mixed Teams Championships; Hard (i) – A$1,000,000 – 8 teams (RR)	United States; 2–1	South Africa	Round robin (Group A) Croatia; Australia; France	Round robin (Group B) Switzerland; Romania; Germany
30 Dec	Gold Coast Classic; Hope Island, Australia; Tier III event Hard – $164,250 – 30S/32Q/16D; Singles – Doubles	(Russia) Elena Likhovtseva; 3–6, 7–6^{(9–7)}, 6–3	(Japan) Ai Sugiyama	(Netherlands) Brenda Schultz-McCarthy (France) Anne-Gaëlle Sidot	(Spain) Magüi Serna (Australia) Rachel McQuillan (Belgium) Sabine Appelmans (Sweden) Åsa Carlsson
30 Dec	Gold Coast Classic; Hope Island, Australia; Tier III event Hard – $164,250 – 30S/32Q/16D; Singles – Doubles	(Japan) Naoko Kijimuta (Japan) Nana Miyagi; 7–6^{(7–3)}, 6–1	(Romania) Ruxandra Dragomir (Italy) Silvia Farina	(Netherlands) Brenda Schultz-McCarthy (France) Anne-Gaëlle Sidot	(Spain) Magüi Serna (Australia) Rachel McQuillan (Belgium) Sabine Appelmans (Sweden) Åsa Carlsson
30 Dec	ASB Bank Classic; Auckland, New Zealand; Tier IV event Hard – $107,500 – 32S/32Q/16D; Singles – Doubles	(Austria) Marion Maruska; 6–3, 6–1	(Austria) Judith Wiesner	(Thailand) Tamarine Tanasugarn (Bulgaria) Elena Pampoulova	(Germany) Anke Huber (United States) Sandra Cacic (Japan) Rika Hiraki (France) Alexia Dechaume-Balleret
30 Dec	ASB Bank Classic; Auckland, New Zealand; Tier IV event Hard – $107,500 – 32S/32Q/16D; Singles – Doubles	(Slovakia) Janette Husárová (Belgium) Dominique Van Roost; 6–2, 6–7^{(5–7)}, 6–3	(Poland) Aleksandra Olsza (Bulgaria) Elena Pampoulova	(Thailand) Tamarine Tanasugarn (Bulgaria) Elena Pampoulova	(Germany) Anke Huber (United States) Sandra Cacic (Japan) Rika Hiraki (France) Alexia Dechaume-Balleret
6 Jan	Sydney International; Sydney, Australia; Tier II event Hard – $342,500 – 28S/32Q/16D; Singles – Doubles	(Switzerland) Martina Hingis; 6–1, 5–7, 6–1	(United States) Jennifer Capriati	(United States) Lindsay Davenport (United States) Mary Joe Fernández	(United States) Amy Frazier (Japan) Naoko Sawamatsu (Croatia) Iva Majoli (Indonesia) Yayuk Basuki
6 Jan	Sydney International; Sydney, Australia; Tier II event Hard – $342,500 – 28S/32Q/16D; Singles – Doubles	(United States) Gigi Fernández (Spain) Arantxa Sánchez Vicario; 6–3, 6–1	(United States) Lindsay Davenport (Belarus) Natasha Zvereva	(United States) Lindsay Davenport (United States) Mary Joe Fernández	(United States) Amy Frazier (Japan) Naoko Sawamatsu (Croatia) Iva Majoli (Indonesia) Yayuk Basuki
6 Jan	ANZ Tasmanian International; Hobart, Australia; Tier IV event Hard – $107,500 – 32S/32Q/16D; Singles – Doubles	(Belgium) Dominique Van Roost; 6–3, 6–3	(United States) Marianne Werdel Witmeyer	(Belgium) Els Callens (Japan) Mana Endo	(France) Anne-Gaëlle Sidot (Chinese Taipei) Wang Shi-ting (Czech Republic) Lenka Cenková (Australia) Annabel Ellwood
6 Jan	ANZ Tasmanian International; Hobart, Australia; Tier IV event Hard – $107,500 – 32S/32Q/16D; Singles – Doubles	(Japan) Naoko Kijimuta (Japan) Nana Miyagi; 6–3, 6–1	(Germany) Barbara Rittner (Belgium) Dominique Van Roost	(Belgium) Els Callens (Japan) Mana Endo	(France) Anne-Gaëlle Sidot (Chinese Taipei) Wang Shi-ting (Czech Republic) Lenka Cenková (Australia) Annabel Ellwood
13 Jan; 20 Jan	Ford Australian Open; Melbourne, Australia; Grand Slam; Hard – $3,451,626 – 128S/64Q/64D/32X; Singles – Doubles – Mixed doubles	(Switzerland) Martina Hingis; 6–2, 6–2	(France) Mary Pierce	(South Africa) Amanda Coetzer (United States) Mary Joe Fernández	(United States) Kimberly Po (Belgium) Sabine Appelmans (Romania) Irina Spîrlea (Belgium) Dominique Van Roost
13 Jan; 20 Jan	Ford Australian Open; Melbourne, Australia; Grand Slam; Hard – $3,451,626 – 128S/64Q/64D/32X; Singles – Doubles – Mixed doubles	(Switzerland) Martina Hingis (Belarus) Natasha Zvereva; 6–2, 6–2	(United States) Lindsay Davenport (United States) Lisa Raymond	(South Africa) Amanda Coetzer (United States) Mary Joe Fernández	(United States) Kimberly Po (Belgium) Sabine Appelmans (Romania) Irina Spîrlea (Belgium) Dominique Van Roost
13 Jan; 20 Jan	Ford Australian Open; Melbourne, Australia; Grand Slam; Hard – $3,451,626 – 128S/64Q/64D/32X; Singles – Doubles – Mixed doubles	(United States) Rick Leach (Netherlands) Manon Bollegraf; 6–3, 6–7^{(5–7)}, 7–5	(South Africa) John-Laffnie de Jager (Latvia) Larisa Savchenko	(South Africa) Amanda Coetzer (United States) Mary Joe Fernández	(United States) Kimberly Po (Belgium) Sabine Appelmans (Romania) Irina Spîrlea (Belgium) Dominique Van Roost
27 Jan	Toray Pan Pacific Open; Tokyo, Japan; Tier I event Hard (i) – $926,250 – 28S/32Q/16D; Singles – Doubles	(Switzerland) Martina Hingis; W/O	(Germany) Steffi Graf	(Netherlands) Brenda Schultz-McCarthy (Germany) Anke Huber	(Croatia) Iva Majoli (Spain) Conchita Martínez (United States) Lindsay Davenport (South Africa) Amanda Coetzer
27 Jan	Toray Pan Pacific Open; Tokyo, Japan; Tier I event Hard (i) – $926,250 – 28S/32Q/16D; Singles – Doubles	(United States) Lindsay Davenport (Belarus) Natasha Zvereva; 6–4, 6–3	(United States) Gigi Fernández (Switzerland) Martina Hingis	(Netherlands) Brenda Schultz-McCarthy (Germany) Anke Huber	(Croatia) Iva Majoli (Spain) Conchita Martínez (United States) Lindsay Davenport (South Africa) Amanda Coetzer

=== February ===
Week	Tournament	Champions	Runners-up	Semifinalists	Quarterfinalists
3 Feb	EA-Generali Austrian Open; Linz, Austria; Tier III event Carpet (i) – $164,250 – 28S/32Q/16D; Singles – Doubles	(United States) Chanda Rubin; 6–4, 6–2	(Slovakia) Karina Habšudová	(Czech Republic) Jana Novotná (Austria) Judith Wiesner	(Bulgaria) Magdalena Maleeva (Germany) Barbara Rittner (France) Nathalie Tauziat (Sweden) Åsa Carlsson
3 Feb	EA-Generali Austrian Open; Linz, Austria; Tier III event Carpet (i) – $164,250 – 28S/32Q/16D; Singles – Doubles	(France) Alexandra Fusai (France) Nathalie Tauziat; 4–6, 6–3, 6–1	(Czech Republic) Eva Melicharová (Czech Republic) Helena Vildová	(Czech Republic) Jana Novotná (Austria) Judith Wiesner	(Bulgaria) Magdalena Maleeva (Germany) Barbara Rittner (France) Nathalie Tauziat (Sweden) Åsa Carlsson
10 Feb	Open Gaz de France; Paris, France; Tier II event Hard (i) – $450,000 – 28S/32Q/16D; Singles – Doubles	(Switzerland) Martina Hingis; 6–3, 3–6, 6–3	(Germany) Anke Huber	(Croatia) Iva Majoli (Czech Republic) Jana Novotná	(France) Nathalie Tauziat (Indonesia) Yayuk Basuki (Romania) Irina Spîrlea (France) Mary Pierce
10 Feb	Open Gaz de France; Paris, France; Tier II event Hard (i) – $450,000 – 28S/32Q/16D; Singles – Doubles	(Switzerland) Martina Hingis (Czech Republic) Jana Novotná; 6–3, 6–0	(France) Alexandra Fusai (Italy) Rita Grande	(Croatia) Iva Majoli (Czech Republic) Jana Novotná	(France) Nathalie Tauziat (Indonesia) Yayuk Basuki (Romania) Irina Spîrlea (France) Mary Pierce
17 Feb	Faber Grand Prix; Hanover, Germany; Tier II event Hard (i) – $450,000 – 28S/32Q/16D; Singles – Doubles	(Croatia) Iva Majoli; 4–6, 7–6^{(7–2)}, 6–4	(Czech Republic) Jana Novotná	(Bulgaria) Magdalena Maleeva (Austria) Barbara Paulus	(Russia) Elena Likhovtseva (France) Sandrine Testud (France) Anne-Gaëlle Sidot (Netherlands) Miriam Oremans
17 Feb	Faber Grand Prix; Hanover, Germany; Tier II event Hard (i) – $450,000 – 28S/32Q/16D; Singles – Doubles	(United States) Nicole Arendt (Netherlands) Manon Bollegraf; 4–6, 6–3, 7–6^{(7–4)}	(Latvia) Larisa Savchenko (Netherlands) Brenda Schultz-McCarthy	(Bulgaria) Magdalena Maleeva (Austria) Barbara Paulus	(Russia) Elena Likhovtseva (France) Sandrine Testud (France) Anne-Gaëlle Sidot (Netherlands) Miriam Oremans
17 Feb	IGA Tennis Classic; Oklahoma City, United States; Tier III event Hard (i) – $164,250 – 30S/32Q/16D; Singles – Doubles	(United States) Lindsay Davenport; 6–4, 6–2	(United States) Lisa Raymond	(United States) Kimberly Po (Italy) Francesca Lubiani	(United States) Jennifer Capriati (United States) Sandra Cacic (United States) Pam Shriver (South Africa) Amanda Coetzer
17 Feb	IGA Tennis Classic; Oklahoma City, United States; Tier III event Hard (i) – $164,250 – 30S/32Q/16D; Singles – Doubles	(Japan) Rika Hiraki (Japan) Nana Miyagi; 6–4, 6–1	(United States) Marianne Werdel (United States) Tami Whitlinger Jones	(United States) Kimberly Po (Italy) Francesca Lubiani	(United States) Jennifer Capriati (United States) Sandra Cacic (United States) Pam Shriver (South Africa) Amanda Coetzer
24 Feb	Fed Cup: Quarterfinals; Haarlem, Netherlands – carpet (i); Mannheim, Germany – hard (i); Tokyo, Japan – hard (i); Sprimont, Belgium – hard (i)	Quarterfinals Winners; Netherlands 3–2; Czech Republic 3–2; France 4–1; Belgium 5–0	Quarterfinals Losers; United States; Germany; Japan; Spain		

=== March ===
Week	Tournament	Champions	Runners-up	Semifinalists	Quarterfinalists
3 Mar; 10 Mar	State Farm Evert Cup; Indian Wells, United States; Tier I event Hard – $1,250,000 – 56S/32Q/28D; Singles – Doubles	(United States) Lindsay Davenport; 6–2, 6–1	(Romania) Irina Spîrlea	(Spain) Arantxa Sánchez Vicario (United States) Mary Joe Fernández	(France) Sandrine Testud (France) Nathalie Tauziat (United States) Venus Williams (Spain) Conchita Martínez
3 Mar; 10 Mar	State Farm Evert Cup; Indian Wells, United States; Tier I event Hard – $1,250,000 – 56S/32Q/28D; Singles – Doubles	(United States) Lindsay Davenport (Belarus) Natasha Zvereva; 6–3, 6–2	(United States) Lisa Raymond (France) Nathalie Tauziat	(Spain) Arantxa Sánchez Vicario (United States) Mary Joe Fernández	(France) Sandrine Testud (France) Nathalie Tauziat (United States) Venus Williams (Spain) Conchita Martínez
17 Mar; 24 Mar	The Lipton Championships; Key Biscayne, United States; Tier I event Hard – $1,750,000 – 96S/64Q/48D; Singles – Doubles	(Switzerland) Martina Hingis; 6–2, 6–1	(United States) Monica Seles	(Czech Republic) Jana Novotná (Austria) Barbara Paulus	(United States) Mary Joe Fernández (Croatia) Iva Majoli (Romania) Irina Spîrlea (France) Sandrine Testud
17 Mar; 24 Mar	The Lipton Championships; Key Biscayne, United States; Tier I event Hard – $1,750,000 – 96S/64Q/48D; Singles – Doubles	(Spain) Arantxa Sánchez Vicario (Belarus) Natasha Zvereva; 6–2, 6–3	(Belgium) Sabine Appelmans (Netherlands) Miriam Oremans	(Czech Republic) Jana Novotná (Austria) Barbara Paulus	(United States) Mary Joe Fernández (Croatia) Iva Majoli (Romania) Irina Spîrlea (France) Sandrine Testud
31 Mar	Family Circle Magazine Cup; Hilton Head Island, United States; Tier I event Clay – $926,250 (green) – 56S/32Q/28D; Singles – Doubles	(Switzerland) Martina Hingis; 3–6, 6–3, 7–6^{(7–5)}	(United States) Monica Seles	(Netherlands) Brenda Schultz-McCarthy (Spain) Conchita Martínez	(Germany) Wiltrud Probst (United States) Lindsay Davenport (Germany) Anke Huber (South Africa) Amanda Coetzer
31 Mar	Family Circle Magazine Cup; Hilton Head Island, United States; Tier I event Clay – $926,250 (green) – 56S/32Q/28D; Singles – Doubles	(United States) Mary Joe Fernández (Switzerland) Martina Hingis; 7–5, 4–6, 6–1	(United States) Lindsay Davenport (Czech Republic) Jana Novotná	(Netherlands) Brenda Schultz-McCarthy (Spain) Conchita Martínez	(Germany) Wiltrud Probst (United States) Lindsay Davenport (Germany) Anke Huber (South Africa) Amanda Coetzer

=== April ===
Week	Tournament	Champions	Runners-up	Semifinalists	Quarterfinalists
7 Apr	Bausch & Lomb Championships; Amelia Island, United States; Tier II event Clay – $450,000 (green) – 56S/32Q/28D; Singles – Doubles	(United States) Lindsay Davenport; 6–2, 6–3	(France) Mary Pierce	(South Africa) Amanda Coetzer (Croatia) Iva Majoli	(United States) Mary Joe Fernández (Germany) Jana Kandarr (Spain) Conchita Martínez (Spain) Arantxa Sánchez Vicario
7 Apr	Bausch & Lomb Championships; Amelia Island, United States; Tier II event Clay – $450,000 (green) – 56S/32Q/28D; Singles – Doubles	(United States) Lindsay Davenport (Czech Republic) Jana Novotná; 6–3, 6–0	(United States) Nicole Arendt (Netherlands) Manon Bollegraf	(South Africa) Amanda Coetzer (Croatia) Iva Majoli	(United States) Mary Joe Fernández (Germany) Jana Kandarr (Spain) Conchita Martínez (Spain) Arantxa Sánchez Vicario
14 Apr	Japan Open; Tokyo, Japan; Tier III event Hard – $164,250 – 32S/32Q/16D; Singles – Doubles	(Japan) Ai Sugiyama; 4–6, 6–4, 6–4	(United States) Amy Frazier	(Australia) Annabel Ellwood (United States) Kimberly Po	(United States) Janet Lee (Japan) Naoko Sawamatsu (United States) Corina Morariu (Chinese Taipei) Wang Shi-ting
14 Apr	Japan Open; Tokyo, Japan; Tier III event Hard – $164,250 – 32S/32Q/16D; Singles – Doubles	(France) Alexia Dechaume-Balleret (Japan) Rika Hiraki; 6–4, 6–2	(Australia) Kerry-Anne Guse (United States) Corina Morariu	(Australia) Annabel Ellwood (United States) Kimberly Po	(United States) Janet Lee (Japan) Naoko Sawamatsu (United States) Corina Morariu (Chinese Taipei) Wang Shi-ting
21 Apr	Budapest Lotto Open; Budapest, Hungary; Tier IV event Clay – $107,500 – 32S/32Q/16D; Singles – Doubles	(South Africa) Amanda Coetzer; 6–1, 6–3	(Belgium) Sabine Appelmans	(Slovakia) Karina Habšudová (Slovakia) Henrieta Nagyová	(France) Alexandra Fusai (Spain) Cristina Torrens Valero (South Africa) Joannette Kruger (Bulgaria) Elena Pampoulova
21 Apr	Budapest Lotto Open; Budapest, Hungary; Tier IV event Clay – $107,500 – 32S/32Q/16D; Singles – Doubles	(South Africa) Amanda Coetzer (France) Alexandra Fusai; 6–3, 6–1	(Czech Republic) Eva Martincová (Bulgaria) Elena Pampoulova	(Slovakia) Karina Habšudová (Slovakia) Henrieta Nagyová	(France) Alexandra Fusai (Spain) Cristina Torrens Valero (South Africa) Joannette Kruger (Bulgaria) Elena Pampoulova
21 Apr	Danamon Open; Jakarta, Indonesia; Tier IV event Hard – $107,500 – 32S/32Q/16D; Singles – Doubles	(Japan) Naoko Sawamatsu; 6–3, 6–2	(Japan) Yuka Yoshida	(France) Alexia Dechaume-Balleret (Italy) Rita Grande	(Chinese Taipei) Wang Shi-ting (South Korea) Kim Eun-ha (Belgium) Nancy Feber (Japan) Nana Miyagi
21 Apr	Danamon Open; Jakarta, Indonesia; Tier IV event Hard – $107,500 – 32S/32Q/16D; Singles – Doubles	(Australia) Kerry-Anne Guse (Australia) Kristine Radford; 6–4, 5–7, 7–5	(Czech Republic) Lenka Němečková (Japan) Yuka Yoshida	(France) Alexia Dechaume-Balleret (Italy) Rita Grande	(Chinese Taipei) Wang Shi-ting (South Korea) Kim Eun-ha (Belgium) Nancy Feber (Japan) Nana Miyagi
28 April	Rexona Cup; Hamburg, Germany; Tier II event Clay – $450,000 – 28S/32Q/16D; Singles – Doubles	(Croatia) Iva Majoli; 6–3, 6–2	(Romania) Ruxandra Dragomir	(France) Anne-Gaëlle Sidot (Spain) María Sánchez Lorenzo	(Czech Republic) Petra Langrová (Austria) Barbara Schett (France) Mary Pierce (Spain) Conchita Martínez
28 April	Rexona Cup; Hamburg, Germany; Tier II event Clay – $450,000 – 28S/32Q/16D; Singles – Doubles	(Germany) Anke Huber (France) Mary Pierce; 2–6, 7–6^{(7–1)}, 6–2	(Romania) Ruxandra Dragomir (Croatia) Iva Majoli	(France) Anne-Gaëlle Sidot (Spain) María Sánchez Lorenzo	(Czech Republic) Petra Langrová (Austria) Barbara Schett (France) Mary Pierce (Spain) Conchita Martínez
28 April	Croatian Bol Ladies Open; Bol, Croatia; Tier IV event Clay – $107,500 – 32S/32Q/16D; Singles – Doubles	(Croatia) Mirjana Lučić; 7–5, 6–7^{(4–7)}, 7–6^{(7–5)}	(United States) Corina Morariu	(South Africa) Amanda Coetzer (Monaco) Emmanuelle Gagliardi	(France) Sarah Pitkowski (Slovakia) Katarína Studeníková (South Africa) Joannette Kruger (Austria) Marion Maruska
28 April	Croatian Bol Ladies Open; Bol, Croatia; Tier IV event Clay – $107,500 – 32S/32Q/16D; Singles – Doubles	(Argentina) Laura Montalvo (Slovakia) Henrieta Nagyová; 6–3, 6–1	(Argentina) María José Gaidano (Austria) Marion Maruska	(South Africa) Amanda Coetzer (Monaco) Emmanuelle Gagliardi	(France) Sarah Pitkowski (Slovakia) Katarína Studeníková (South Africa) Joannette Kruger (Austria) Marion Maruska

=== May ===
Week	Tournament	Champions	Runners-up	Semifinalists	Quarterfinalists
5 May	Italian Open; Rome, Italy; Tier I event Clay – $926,250 – 56S/32Q/28D; Singles – Doubles	(France) Mary Pierce; 6–4, 6–0	(Spain) Conchita Martínez	(Austria) Barbara Paulus (Switzerland) Patty Schnyder	(Romania) Ruxandra Dragomir (Romania) Irina Spîrlea (South Africa) Joannette Kruger (Spain) Arantxa Sánchez Vicario
5 May	Italian Open; Rome, Italy; Tier I event Clay – $926,250 – 56S/32Q/28D; Singles – Doubles	(United States) Nicole Arendt (Netherlands) Manon Bollegraf; 6–2, 6–4	(Spain) Conchita Martínez (Argentina) Patricia Tarabini	(Austria) Barbara Paulus (Switzerland) Patty Schnyder	(Romania) Ruxandra Dragomir (Romania) Irina Spîrlea (South Africa) Joannette Kruger (Spain) Arantxa Sánchez Vicario
12 May	German Open; Berlin, Germany; Tier I event Clay – $926,250 – 56S/32Q/16D; Singles – Doubles	(United States) Mary Joe Fernández; 6–4, 6–2	(France) Mary Pierce	(South Africa) Amanda Coetzer (Czech Republic) Jana Novotná	(Germany) Steffi Graf (Croatia) Iva Majoli (Russia) Anna Kournikova (Belgium) Sabine Appelmans
12 May	German Open; Berlin, Germany; Tier I event Clay – $926,250 – 56S/32Q/16D; Singles – Doubles	(United States) Lindsay Davenport (Czech Republic) Jana Novotná; 6–3, 3–6, 6–2	(United States) Gigi Fernández (Belarus) Natasha Zvereva	(South Africa) Amanda Coetzer (Czech Republic) Jana Novotná	(Germany) Steffi Graf (Croatia) Iva Majoli (Russia) Anna Kournikova (Belgium) Sabine Appelmans
12 May	Welsh International Open; Cardiff, Great Britain; Tier IV event Clay – $107,500 – 56S/32Q/28D; Singles – Doubles	(Spain) Virginia Ruano Pascual; 6–1, 3–6, 6–2	(France) Alexia Dechaume-Balleret	(Italy) Rita Grande (France) Sarah Pitkowski	(Belgium) Dominique Van Roost (Czech Republic) Petra Langrová (Italy) Francesca Lubiani (Sweden) Åsa Carlsson
12 May	Welsh International Open; Cardiff, Great Britain; Tier IV event Clay – $107,500 – 56S/32Q/28D; Singles – Doubles	(United States) Debbie Graham (Australia) Kerry-Anne Guse; 6–3, 6–4	(United Kingdom) Julie Pullin (United Kingdom) Lorna Woodroffe	(Italy) Rita Grande (France) Sarah Pitkowski	(Belgium) Dominique Van Roost (Czech Republic) Petra Langrová (Italy) Francesca Lubiani (Sweden) Åsa Carlsson
19 May	Open Páginas Amarillas; Madrid, Spain; Tier III event Clay – $175,000 – 56S/32Q/28D; Singles – Doubles	(Czech Republic) Jana Novotná; 7–5, 6–1	(United States) Monica Seles	(Argentina) Florencia Labat (Spain) Arantxa Sánchez Vicario	(Spain) Virginia Ruano Pascual (Romania) Irina Spîrlea (United States) Ann Grossman (Spain) Gala León García
19 May	Open Páginas Amarillas; Madrid, Spain; Tier III event Clay – $175,000 – 56S/32Q/28D; Singles – Doubles	(United States) Mary Joe Fernández (Spain) Arantxa Sánchez Vicario; 6–3, 6–2	(Argentina) Inés Gorrochategui (Romania) Irina Spîrlea	(Argentina) Florencia Labat (Spain) Arantxa Sánchez Vicario	(Spain) Virginia Ruano Pascual (Romania) Irina Spîrlea (United States) Ann Grossman (Spain) Gala León García
19 May	Internationaux de Strasbourg; Strasbourg, France; Tier III event Clay – $250,000 – 30S/32Q/16D; Singles – Doubles	(Germany) Steffi Graf; 6–2, 7–5	(Croatia) Mirjana Lučić	(South Africa) Amanda Coetzer (Austria) Judith Wiesner	(France) Sandrine Testud (Japan) Naoko Kijimuta (Belgium) Sabine Appelmans (Belarus) Natasha Zvereva
19 May	Internationaux de Strasbourg; Strasbourg, France; Tier III event Clay – $250,000 – 30S/32Q/16D; Singles – Doubles	(Czech Republic) Helena Suková (Belarus) Natasha Zvereva; 6–1, 6–1	(Russia) Elena Likhovtseva (Japan) Ai Sugiyama	(South Africa) Amanda Coetzer (Austria) Judith Wiesner	(France) Sandrine Testud (Japan) Naoko Kijimuta (Belgium) Sabine Appelmans (Belarus) Natasha Zvereva
26 May; 2 Jun	French Open; Paris, France; Grand Slam; Clay – $4,566,003 – 128S/64D/48X; Singles – Doubles – Mixed doubles	(Croatia) Iva Majoli; 6–4, 6–2	(Switzerland) Martina Hingis	(United States) Monica Seles (South Africa) Amanda Coetzer	(Spain) Arantxa Sánchez Vicario (United States) Mary Joe Fernández (Romania) Ruxandra Dragomir (Germany) Steffi Graf
26 May; 2 Jun	French Open; Paris, France; Grand Slam; Clay – $4,566,003 – 128S/64D/48X; Singles – Doubles – Mixed doubles	(United States) Gigi Fernández (Belarus) Natasha Zvereva; 6–2, 6–3	(United States) Mary Joe Fernández (United States) Lisa Raymond	(United States) Monica Seles (South Africa) Amanda Coetzer	(Spain) Arantxa Sánchez Vicario (United States) Mary Joe Fernández (Romania) Ruxandra Dragomir (Germany) Steffi Graf
26 May; 2 Jun	French Open; Paris, France; Grand Slam; Clay – $4,566,003 – 128S/64D/48X; Singles – Doubles – Mixed doubles	(India) Mahesh Bhupathi (Japan) Rika Hiraki; 6–4, 6–1	(United States) Patrick Galbraith (United States) Lisa Raymond	(United States) Monica Seles (South Africa) Amanda Coetzer	(Spain) Arantxa Sánchez Vicario (United States) Mary Joe Fernández (Romania) Ruxandra Dragomir (Germany) Steffi Graf

=== June ===
Week	Tournament	Champions	Runners-up	Semifinalists	Quarterfinalists
9 Jun	DFS Classic; Birmingham, Great Britain; Tier III event Grass – $164,250 – 56S/32Q/16D; Singles – Doubles	(France) Nathalie Tauziat; 2–6, 6–2, 6–2	(Indonesia) Yayuk Basuki	(Romania) Irina Spîrlea (Australia) Kristine Kunce	(Belgium) Dominique Van Roost (Bulgaria) Magdalena Maleeva (United States) Lisa Raymond (Belarus) Natasha Zvereva
9 Jun	DFS Classic; Birmingham, Great Britain; Tier III event Grass – $164,250 – 56S/32Q/16D; Singles – Doubles	(United States) Katrina Adams (Latvia) Larisa Savchenko; 6–2, 6–3	(France) Nathalie Tauziat (United States) Linda Wild	(Romania) Irina Spîrlea (Australia) Kristine Kunce	(Belgium) Dominique Van Roost (Bulgaria) Magdalena Maleeva (United States) Lisa Raymond (Belarus) Natasha Zvereva
16 Jun	Aegon International; Eastbourne, Great Britain; Tier II event Grass – $450,000 – 28S/32Q/16D; Singles – Doubles	(Spain) Arantxa Sánchez Vicario vs. (Czech Republic) Jana Novotná (cancelled due to rain)		(Netherlands) Brenda Schultz-McCarthy (Belarus) Natasha Zvereva	(United States) Monica Seles (Romania) Irina Spîrlea (France) Nathalie Tauziat (Japan) Ai Sugiyama
16 Jun	Aegon International; Eastbourne, Great Britain; Tier II event Grass – $450,000 – 28S/32Q/16D; Singles – Doubles	(United States) Lori McNeil / (Czech Republic) Helena Suková vs. (United States) Nicole Arendt / (Netherlands) Manon Bollegraf (cancelled due to rain)		(Netherlands) Brenda Schultz-McCarthy (Belarus) Natasha Zvereva	(United States) Monica Seles (Romania) Irina Spîrlea (France) Nathalie Tauziat (Japan) Ai Sugiyama
16 Jun	Heineken Trophy 's-Hertogenbosch, Netherlands; Tier III event Grass – $164,250 – 30S/16D; Singles – Doubles	(Romania) Ruxandra Dragomir; 5–7, 6–2, 6–4	(Netherlands) Miriam Oremans	(Germany) Anke Huber (Sweden) Åsa Carlsson	(Belgium) Sabine Appelmans (Slovakia) Karina Habšudová (Belgium) Dominique Van Roost (France) Mary Pierce
16 Jun	Heineken Trophy 's-Hertogenbosch, Netherlands; Tier III event Grass – $164,250 – 30S/16D; Singles – Doubles	(Czech Republic) Eva Melicharová (Czech Republic) Helena Vildová; 6–3, 7–6^{(8–6)}	(Slovakia) Karina Habšudová (Argentina) Florencia Labat	(Germany) Anke Huber (Sweden) Åsa Carlsson	(Belgium) Sabine Appelmans (Slovakia) Karina Habšudová (Belgium) Dominique Van Roost (France) Mary Pierce
23 Jun; 30 Jun	Wimbledon Championships; London, Great Britain; Grand Slam; Grass – $4,083,056 – 128S/64D/32X; Singles – Doubles – Mixed doubles	(Switzerland) Martina Hingis; 2–6, 6–3, 6–3	(Czech Republic) Jana Novotná	(Russia) Anna Kournikova (Spain) Arantxa Sánchez Vicario	(Czech Republic) Denisa Chládková (Croatia) Iva Majoli (Indonesia) Yayuk Basuki (France) Nathalie Tauziat
23 Jun; 30 Jun	Wimbledon Championships; London, Great Britain; Grand Slam; Grass – $4,083,056 – 128S/64D/32X; Singles – Doubles – Mixed doubles	(United States) Gigi Fernández (Belarus) Natasha Zvereva; 7–6^{(7–4)}, 6–4	(United States) Nicole Arendt (Netherlands) Manon Bollegraf	(Russia) Anna Kournikova (Spain) Arantxa Sánchez Vicario	(Czech Republic) Denisa Chládková (Croatia) Iva Majoli (Indonesia) Yayuk Basuki (France) Nathalie Tauziat
23 Jun; 30 Jun	Wimbledon Championships; London, Great Britain; Grand Slam; Grass – $4,083,056 – 128S/64D/32X; Singles – Doubles – Mixed doubles	(Czech Republic) Cyril Suk (Czech Republic) Helena Suková; 4–6, 6–3, 6–4	(Russia) Andrei Olhovskiy (Latvia) Larisa Savchenko	(Russia) Anna Kournikova (Spain) Arantxa Sánchez Vicario	(Czech Republic) Denisa Chládková (Croatia) Iva Majoli (Indonesia) Yayuk Basuki (France) Nathalie Tauziat

=== July ===
Week	Tournament	Champions	Runners-up	Semifinalists	Quarterfinalists
7 Jul	Fed Cup: Semifinals; Prague, Czech Republic – Clay; Nice, France – Clay	Semifinals Winners; Netherlands 3–2; France 3–2	Semifinals Losers; Czech Republic; Belgium		
14 Jul	Torneo Internazionale; Palermo, Italy; Tier IV event Clay – $163,000 – 32S/32Q/16D; Singles – Doubles	(France) Sandrine Testud; 7–5, 6–3	(Russia) Elena Makarova	(Austria) Barbara Paulus (Austria) Barbara Schett	(Argentina) Inés Gorrochategui (Italy) Silvia Farina (Spain) Virginia Ruano Pascual (Monaco) Emmanuelle Gagliardi
14 Jul	Torneo Internazionale; Palermo, Italy; Tier IV event Clay – $163,000 – 32S/32Q/16D; Singles – Doubles	(Italy) Silvia Farina (Austria) Barbara Schett; 2–6, 6–1, 6–4	(Argentina) Florencia Labat (Argentina) Mercedes Paz	(Austria) Barbara Paulus (Austria) Barbara Schett	(Argentina) Inés Gorrochategui (Italy) Silvia Farina (Spain) Virginia Ruano Pascual (Monaco) Emmanuelle Gagliardi
14 Jul	Skoda Czech Open; Prague, Czech Republic; Tier IV event Clay – $160,000 – 32S/32Q/16D; Singles – Doubles	(South Africa) Joannette Kruger; 6–1, 6–1	(Austria) Marion Maruska	(Germany) Veronika Martinek (Romania) Cătălina Cristea	(France) Alexia Dechaume-Balleret (Czech Republic) Denisa Chládková (Slovakia) Karina Habšudová (Czech Republic) Ludmila Richterová
14 Jul	Skoda Czech Open; Prague, Czech Republic; Tier IV event Clay – $160,000 – 32S/32Q/16D; Singles – Doubles	(Romania) Ruxandra Dragomir (Slovakia) Karina Habšudová; 6–1, 5–7, 6–2	(Czech Republic) Eva Martincová (Czech Republic) Helena Vildová	(Germany) Veronika Martinek (Romania) Cătălina Cristea	(France) Alexia Dechaume-Balleret (Czech Republic) Denisa Chládková (Slovakia) Karina Habšudová (Czech Republic) Ludmila Richterová
21 Jul	Bank of the West Classic; Stanford, United States; Tier II event Hard – $450,000 – 28S/32Q/16D; Singles – Doubles	(Switzerland) Martina Hingis; 6–0, 6–2	(Spain) Conchita Martínez	(United States) Lindsay Davenport (South Africa) Amanda Coetzer	(United States) Linda Wild (Russia) Elena Likhovtseva (United States) Kimberly Po (United States) Monica Seles
21 Jul	Bank of the West Classic; Stanford, United States; Tier II event Hard – $450,000 – 28S/32Q/16D; Singles – Doubles	(United States) Lindsay Davenport (Switzerland) Martina Hingis; 6–1, 6–3	(Spain) Conchita Martínez (Argentina) Patricia Tarabini	(United States) Lindsay Davenport (South Africa) Amanda Coetzer	(United States) Linda Wild (Russia) Elena Likhovtseva (United States) Kimberly Po (United States) Monica Seles
21 Jul	Warsaw Cup by Heros; Warsaw, Poland; Tier III event Clay – $164,250 – 32S/32Q/16D; Singles – Doubles	(Austria) Barbara Paulus; 6–4, 6–4	(Slovakia) Henrieta Nagyová	(Spain) Virginia Ruano Pascual (Romania) Ruxandra Dragomir	(Spain) Gala León García (South Africa) Joannette Kruger (Spain) Cristina Torrens Valero (Slovakia) Katarína Studeníková
21 Jul	Warsaw Cup by Heros; Warsaw, Poland; Tier III event Clay – $164,250 – 32S/32Q/16D; Singles – Doubles	(Romania) Ruxandra Dragomir (Argentina) Inés Gorrochategui; 6–4, 6–0	(Germany) Meike Babel (Australia) Catherine Barclay	(Spain) Virginia Ruano Pascual (Romania) Ruxandra Dragomir	(Spain) Gala León García (South Africa) Joannette Kruger (Spain) Cristina Torrens Valero (Slovakia) Katarína Studeníková
28 Jul	Toshiba Classic; San Diego, United States; Tier II event Hard – $450,000 – 28S/32Q/16D; Singles – Doubles	(Switzerland) Martina Hingis; 7–6^{(7–4)}, 6–4	(United States) Monica Seles	(France) Mary Pierce (South Africa) Amanda Coetzer	(Spain) Conchita Martínez (France) Sandrine Testud (Indonesia) Yayuk Basuki (Belarus) Natasha Zvereva
28 Jul	Toshiba Classic; San Diego, United States; Tier II event Hard – $450,000 – 28S/32Q/16D; Singles – Doubles	(Switzerland) Martina Hingis (Spain) Arantxa Sánchez Vicario; 6–3, 7–5	(United States) Amy Frazier (United States) Kimberly Po	(France) Mary Pierce (South Africa) Amanda Coetzer	(Spain) Conchita Martínez (France) Sandrine Testud (Indonesia) Yayuk Basuki (Belarus) Natasha Zvereva
28 Jul	Styria Open; Maria Lankowitz, Austria; Tier IV event Clay – $107,500 – 32S/32Q/16D; Singles – Doubles	(Austria) Barbara Schett; 3–6, 6–2, 6–3	(Slovakia) Henrieta Nagyová	(Spain) María Sánchez Lorenzo (Germany) Meike Babel	(Austria) Barbara Paulus (Austria) Judith Wiesner (Switzerland) Patty Schnyder (Spain) Gala León García
28 Jul	Styria Open; Maria Lankowitz, Austria; Tier IV event Clay – $107,500 – 32S/32Q/16D; Singles – Doubles	(Czech Republic) Eva Melicharová (Czech Republic) Helena Vildová; 6–2, 6–2	(Czech Republic) Radka Bobková (Germany) Wiltrud Probst	(Spain) María Sánchez Lorenzo (Germany) Meike Babel	(Austria) Barbara Paulus (Austria) Judith Wiesner (Switzerland) Patty Schnyder (Spain) Gala León García

=== August ===
Week	Tournament	Champions	Runners-up	Semifinalists	Quarterfinalists
4 Aug	Acura Classic; Manhattan Beach, United States; Tier II event Hard – $450,000 – 30S/32Q/16D; Singles – Doubles	(United States) Monica Seles; 5–7, 7–5, 6–4	(United States) Lindsay Davenport	(Switzerland) Martina Hingis (United States) Amy Frazier	(Germany) Anke Huber (France) Nathalie Tauziat (Spain) Arantxa Sánchez Vicario (Belarus) Natasha Zvereva
4 Aug	Acura Classic; Manhattan Beach, United States; Tier II event Hard – $450,000 – 30S/32Q/16D; Singles – Doubles	(Indonesia) Yayuk Basuki (Netherlands) Caroline Vis; 7–6^{(9–7)}, 6–3	(Latvia) Larisa Savchenko (Czech Republic) Helena Suková	(Switzerland) Martina Hingis (United States) Amy Frazier	(Germany) Anke Huber (France) Nathalie Tauziat (Spain) Arantxa Sánchez Vicario (Belarus) Natasha Zvereva
11 Aug	du Maurier Open; Toronto, Canada; Tier I event Hard – $926,250 – 56S/32Q/16D; Singles – Doubles	(United States) Monica Seles; 6–2, 6–4	(Germany) Anke Huber	(Spain) Conchita Martínez (United States) Mary Joe Fernández	(Italy) Rita Grande (United States) Lindsay Davenport (South Africa) Amanda Coetzer (Bulgaria) Magdalena Maleeva
11 Aug	du Maurier Open; Toronto, Canada; Tier I event Hard – $926,250 – 56S/32Q/16D; Singles – Doubles	(Indonesia) Yayuk Basuki (Netherlands) Caroline Vis; 3–6, 7–5, 6–4	(United States) Nicole Arendt (Netherlands) Manon Bollegraf	(Spain) Conchita Martínez (United States) Mary Joe Fernández	(Italy) Rita Grande (United States) Lindsay Davenport (South Africa) Amanda Coetzer (Bulgaria) Magdalena Maleeva
18 Aug	U.S. Hardcourt Championships; Atlanta, United States; Tier II event Hard – $450,000 – 28S/32Q/16D; Singles – Doubles	(United States) Lindsay Davenport; 6–4, 6–1	(France) Sandrine Testud	(South Africa) Amanda Coetzer (Croatia) Iva Majoli	(Czech Republic) Jana Novotná (Belgium) Dominique Van Roost (Netherlands) Brenda Schultz-McCarthy (United States) Monica Seles
18 Aug	U.S. Hardcourt Championships; Atlanta, United States; Tier II event Hard – $450,000 – 28S/32Q/16D; Singles – Doubles	(United States) Nicole Arendt (Netherlands) Manon Bollegraf; 6–7^{(5–7)}, 6–3, 6–2	(France) Alexandra Fusai (France) Nathalie Tauziat	(South Africa) Amanda Coetzer (Croatia) Iva Majoli	(Czech Republic) Jana Novotná (Belgium) Dominique Van Roost (Netherlands) Brenda Schultz-McCarthy (United States) Monica Seles
25 Aug; 1 Sep	US Open; New York City, United States; Grand Slam; Hard – $4,976,000 – 128S/64D/32X; Singles – Doubles – Mixed doubles	(Switzerland) Martina Hingis; 6–0, 6–4	(United States) Venus Williams	(United States) Lindsay Davenport (Romania) Irina Spîrlea	(Spain) Arantxa Sánchez Vicario (Czech Republic) Jana Novotná (France) Sandrine Testud (United States) Monica Seles
25 Aug; 1 Sep	US Open; New York City, United States; Grand Slam; Hard – $4,976,000 – 128S/64D/32X; Singles – Doubles – Mixed doubles	(United States) Lindsay Davenport (Czech Republic) Jana Novotná; 6–3, 6–4	(United States) Gigi Fernández (Belarus) Natasha Zvereva	(United States) Lindsay Davenport (Romania) Irina Spîrlea	(Spain) Arantxa Sánchez Vicario (Czech Republic) Jana Novotná (France) Sandrine Testud (United States) Monica Seles
25 Aug; 1 Sep	US Open; New York City, United States; Grand Slam; Hard – $4,976,000 – 128S/64D/32X; Singles – Doubles – Mixed doubles	(United States) Rick Leach (Netherlands) Manon Bollegraf; 3–6, 7–5, 7–6^{(7–3)}	(Argentina) Pablo Albano (Argentina) Mercedes Paz	(United States) Lindsay Davenport (Romania) Irina Spîrlea	(Spain) Arantxa Sánchez Vicario (Czech Republic) Jana Novotná (France) Sandrine Testud (United States) Monica Seles

=== September ===
Week	Tournament	Champions	Runners-up	Semifinalists	Quarterfinalists
15 Sep	Toyota Princess Cup; Tokyo, Japan; Tier II event Hard – $450,000 – 28S/32Q/16D; Singles – Doubles	(United States) Monica Seles; 6–1, 3–6, 7–6^{(7–5)}	(Spain) Arantxa Sánchez Vicario	(Japan) Naoko Sawamatsu (Indonesia) Yayuk Basuki	(Belarus) Natasha Zvereva (Spain) Conchita Martínez (United States) Kimberly Po (China) Li Fang
15 Sep	Toyota Princess Cup; Tokyo, Japan; Tier II event Hard – $450,000 – 28S/32Q/16D; Singles – Doubles	(United States) Monica Seles (Japan) Ai Sugiyama; 6–1, 6–0	(France) Julie Halard-Decugis (United States) Chanda Rubin	(Japan) Naoko Sawamatsu (Indonesia) Yayuk Basuki	(Belarus) Natasha Zvereva (Spain) Conchita Martínez (United States) Kimberly Po (China) Li Fang
22 Sep	Sparkassen Cup International GP; Leipzig, Germany; Tier II event Carpet (i) – $450,000 – 28S/32Q/16D; Singles – Doubles	(Czech Republic) Jana Novotná; 6–2, 4–6, 6–3	(South Africa) Amanda Coetzer	(Switzerland) Martina Hingis (Germany) Anke Huber	(Belgium) Sabine Appelmans (Poland) Magdalena Grzybowska (Croatia) Iva Majoli (Czech Republic) Sandra Kleinová
22 Sep	Sparkassen Cup International GP; Leipzig, Germany; Tier II event Carpet (i) – $450,000 – 28S/32Q/16D; Singles – Doubles	(Switzerland) Martina Hingis (Czech Republic) Jana Novotná; 6–2, 6–2	(Indonesia) Yayuk Basuki (Czech Republic) Helena Suková	(Switzerland) Martina Hingis (Germany) Anke Huber	(Belgium) Sabine Appelmans (Poland) Magdalena Grzybowska (Croatia) Iva Majoli (Czech Republic) Sandra Kleinová
22 Sep	Wismilak International; Surabaya, Indonesia; Tier IV event Hard – $155,340 – 32S/28Q/16D; Singles – Doubles	(Belgium) Dominique Van Roost; 6–1, 6–3	(Czech Republic) Lenka Němečková	(Australia) Rachel McQuillan (Venezuela) María Vento	(Madagascar) Dally Randriantefy (Australia) Nicole Pratt (France) Sarah Pitkowski (Japan) Haruka Inoue
22 Sep	Wismilak International; Surabaya, Indonesia; Tier IV event Hard – $155,340 – 32S/28Q/16D; Singles – Doubles	(Australia) Kerry-Anne Guse (Japan) Rika Hiraki; 6–1, 7–6^{(7–5)}	(Canada) Maureen Drake (Canada) Renata Kolbovic	(Australia) Rachel McQuillan (Venezuela) María Vento	(Madagascar) Dally Randriantefy (Australia) Nicole Pratt (France) Sarah Pitkowski (Japan) Haruka Inoue
29 Sep	Fed Cup: Final 's-Hertogenbosch, Netherlands; Carpet (i)	France; 4–1	Netherlands		

=== October ===
Week	Tournament	Champions	Runners-up	Semifinalists	Quarterfinalists
6 Oct	Porsche Tennis Grand Prix; Filderstadt, Germany; Tier II event Hard (i) – $450,000 – 28S/32Q/16D; Singles – Doubles	(Switzerland) Martina Hingis; 6–4, 6–2	(United States) Lisa Raymond	(South Africa) Amanda Coetzer (Romania) Irina Spîrlea	(Bulgaria) Magdalena Maleeva (Switzerland) Patty Schnyder (Spain) Arantxa Sánchez Vicario (Japan) Naoko Sawamatsu
6 Oct	Porsche Tennis Grand Prix; Filderstadt, Germany; Tier II event Hard (i) – $450,000 – 28S/32Q/16D; Singles – Doubles	(Switzerland) Martina Hingis (Spain) Arantxa Sánchez Vicario; 7–6^{(7–4)}, 3–6, 7–6^{(7–3)}	(United States) Lindsay Davenport (Czech Republic) Jana Novotná	(South Africa) Amanda Coetzer (Romania) Irina Spîrlea	(Bulgaria) Magdalena Maleeva (Switzerland) Patty Schnyder (Spain) Arantxa Sánchez Vicario (Japan) Naoko Sawamatsu
13 Oct	European Indoor Championships; Zürich, Switzerland; Tier I event Hard – $926,250 – 28S/32Q/16D; Singles – Doubles	(United States) Lindsay Davenport; 7–6^{(7–3)}, 7–5	(France) Nathalie Tauziat	(United States) Lisa Raymond (Czech Republic) Jana Novotná	(Switzerland) Martina Hingis (Belgium) Sabine Appelmans (United States) Venus Williams (Czech Republic) Sandra Kleinová
13 Oct	European Indoor Championships; Zürich, Switzerland; Tier I event Hard – $926,250 – 28S/32Q/16D; Singles – Doubles	(Switzerland) Martina Hingis (Spain) Arantxa Sánchez Vicario; 4–6, 6–4, 6–1	(Latvia) Larisa Savchenko (Czech Republic) Helena Suková	(United States) Lisa Raymond (Czech Republic) Jana Novotná	(Switzerland) Martina Hingis (Belgium) Sabine Appelmans (United States) Venus Williams (Czech Republic) Sandra Kleinová
20 Oct	SEAT Open; Kockelscheuer, Luxembourg; Tier III event Carpet (i) – $164,250 – 30S/32Q/16D; Singles – Doubles	(South Africa) Amanda Coetzer; 6–4, 3–6, 7–5	(Austria) Barbara Paulus	(Slovakia) Katarína Studeníková (France) Anne-Gaëlle Sidot	(Netherlands) Miriam Oremans (South Africa) Joannette Kruger (Belgium) Sabine Appelmans (Slovakia) Henrieta Nagyová
20 Oct	SEAT Open; Kockelscheuer, Luxembourg; Tier III event Carpet (i) – $164,250 – 30S/32Q/16D; Singles – Doubles	(Latvia) Larisa Savchenko (Czech Republic) Helena Suková; 6–2, 6–4	(Germany) Meike Babel (Belgium) Laurence Courtois	(Slovakia) Katarína Studeníková (France) Anne-Gaëlle Sidot	(Netherlands) Miriam Oremans (South Africa) Joannette Kruger (Belgium) Sabine Appelmans (Slovakia) Henrieta Nagyová
20 Oct	Bell Challenge; Quebec City, Canada; Tier III event Carpet (i) – $164,250 – 28S/32Q/16D; Singles – Doubles	(Netherlands) Brenda Schultz-McCarthy; 6–4, 6–7^{(4–7)}, 7–5	(Belgium) Dominique Van Roost	(United States) Chanda Rubin (United States) Lisa Raymond	(United States) Corina Morariu (Venezuela) María Vento (United States) Jolene Watanabe (Poland) Magdalena Grzybowska
20 Oct	Bell Challenge; Quebec City, Canada; Tier III event Carpet (i) – $164,250 – 28S/32Q/16D; Singles – Doubles	(United States) Lisa Raymond (Australia) Rennae Stubbs; 6–4, 5–7, 7–5	(France) Alexandra Fusai (France) Nathalie Tauziat	(United States) Chanda Rubin (United States) Lisa Raymond	(United States) Corina Morariu (Venezuela) María Vento (United States) Jolene Watanabe (Poland) Magdalena Grzybowska
27 Oct	Kremlin Cup; Moscow, Russia; Tier I event Carpet (i) – $926,250 – 28S/32Q/16D; Singles – Doubles	(Czech Republic) Jana Novotná; 6–3, 6–4	(Japan) Ai Sugiyama	(Spain) Conchita Martínez (Belgium) Dominique Van Roost	(United States) Venus Williams (France) Sandrine Testud (Spain) Arantxa Sánchez Vicario (Romania) Irina Spîrlea
27 Oct	Kremlin Cup; Moscow, Russia; Tier I event Carpet (i) – $926,250 – 28S/32Q/16D; Singles – Doubles	(Spain) Arantxa Sánchez Vicario (Belarus) Natasha Zvereva; 5-3 def.	(Indonesia) Yayuk Basuki (Netherlands) Caroline Vis	(Spain) Conchita Martínez (Belgium) Dominique Van Roost	(United States) Venus Williams (France) Sandrine Testud (Spain) Arantxa Sánchez Vicario (Romania) Irina Spîrlea

=== November ===
Week	Tournament	Champions	Runners-up	Semifinalists	Quarterfinalists
3 Nov	Ameritech Cup; Chicago, United States; Tier II event Carpet (i) – $450,000 – 28S/32Q/16D; Singles – Doubles	(United States) Lindsay Davenport; 6–0, 7–5	(France) Nathalie Tauziat	(Croatia) Iva Majoli (United States) Serena Williams	(Czech Republic) Jana Novotná (Indonesia) Yayuk Basuki (United States) Lisa Raymond (United States) Monica Seles
3 Nov	Ameritech Cup; Chicago, United States; Tier II event Carpet (i) – $450,000 – 28S/32Q/16D; Singles – Doubles	(France) Alexandra Fusai (France) Nathalie Tauziat; 6–3, 6–2	(United States) Lindsay Davenport (United States) Monica Seles	(Croatia) Iva Majoli (United States) Serena Williams	(Czech Republic) Jana Novotná (Indonesia) Yayuk Basuki (United States) Lisa Raymond (United States) Monica Seles
10 Nov	Advanta Championships; Philadelphia, United States; Tier II event Carpet (i) – $450,000 – 30S/32Q/16D; Singles – Doubles	(Switzerland) Martina Hingis; 7–5, 6–7^{(7–9)}, 7–6^{(7–4)}	(United States) Lindsay Davenport	(Spain) Arantxa Sánchez Vicario (Romania) Irina Spîrlea	(Germany) Anke Huber (South Africa) Amanda Coetzer (United States) Monica Seles (Czech Republic) Jana Novotná
10 Nov	Advanta Championships; Philadelphia, United States; Tier II event Carpet (i) – $450,000 – 30S/32Q/16D; Singles – Doubles	(United States) Lisa Raymond (Australia) Rennae Stubbs; 6–3, 7–5	(United States) Lindsay Davenport (Czech Republic) Jana Novotná	(Spain) Arantxa Sánchez Vicario (Romania) Irina Spîrlea	(Germany) Anke Huber (South Africa) Amanda Coetzer (United States) Monica Seles (Czech Republic) Jana Novotná
17 Nov	Chase Championships; New York City, United States; Year-End Championships; Carpet (i) – $2,000,000 – 16S/8D; Singles – Doubles	(Czech Republic) Jana Novotná; 7–6^{(7–4)}, 6–2, 6–3	(France) Mary Pierce	(France) Nathalie Tauziat (Romania) Irina Spîrlea	(Switzerland) Martina Hingis (Croatia) Iva Majoli (United States) Mary Joe Fernández (Spain) Arantxa Sánchez Vicario
17 Nov	Chase Championships; New York City, United States; Year-End Championships; Carpet (i) – $2,000,000 – 16S/8D; Singles – Doubles	(United States) Lindsay Davenport (Czech Republic) Jana Novotná; 6–7^{(5–7)}, 6–3, 6–2	(France) Alexandra Fusai (France) Nathalie Tauziat	(France) Nathalie Tauziat (Romania) Irina Spîrlea	(Switzerland) Martina Hingis (Croatia) Iva Majoli (United States) Mary Joe Fernández (Spain) Arantxa Sánchez Vicario
17 Nov	Volvo Women's Open; Pattaya, Thailand; Tier IV event Hard – $107,500 – 30S/32Q/16D; Singles – Doubles	(Slovakia) Henrieta Nagyová; 7–5, 6–7^{(6–8)}, 7–5	(Belgium) Dominique Van Roost	(Romania) Ruxandra Dragomir (Belarus) Olga Barabanschikova	(United States) Corina Morariu (Czech Republic) Sandra Kleinová (Australia) Nicole Pratt (Belgium) Laurence Courtois
17 Nov	Volvo Women's Open; Pattaya, Thailand; Tier IV event Hard – $107,500 – 30S/32Q/16D; Singles – Doubles	(Australia) Kristine Kunce (United States) Corina Morariu; 6–3, 6–4	(Argentina) Florencia Labat (Belgium) Dominique Van Roost	(Romania) Ruxandra Dragomir (Belarus) Olga Barabanschikova	(United States) Corina Morariu (Czech Republic) Sandra Kleinová (Australia) Nicole Pratt (Belgium) Laurence Courtois

== Statistical Information ==
List of players and titles won, last name alphabetically:

- (Switzerland) Martina Hingis – Sydney, Australian Open, Tokyo (Tier I), Paris, Miami, Hilton Head, Wimbledon, Stanford, San Diego, US Open, Filderstadt, Philadelphia (12)
- (United States) Lindsay Davenport – Oklahoma City, Indian Wells, Amelia Island, Atlanta, Zurich, Chicago (6)
- (Czech Republic) Jana Novotná – Madrid, Leipzig, Moscow, Season-Ending Championships (4)
- (Croatia) Iva Majoli – Hanover, Hamburg, French Open (3)
- (United States) Monica Seles – Los Angeles, Toronto, Tokyo (Tier II) (3)
- (South Africa) Amanda Coetzer – Budapest, Luxembourg (2)
- (Belgium) Dominique Van Roost – Hobart, Surabaya (2)
- (Romania) Ruxandra Dragomir – Rosmalen (1)
- (United States) Mary Joe Fernández – Berlin (1)
- (Germany) Steffi Graf – Strasbourg (1)
- (South Africa) Joannette Kruger – Prague (1)
- (Russia) Elena Likhovtseva – Hope Island (1)
- (Croatia) Mirjana Lučić – Bol (1)
- (Austria) Marion Maruska – Auckland (1)
- (Slovakia) Henrieta Nagyová – Pattaya (1)
- (Austria) Barbara Paulus – Warsaw (1)
- (France) Mary Pierce – Rome (1)
- (Spain) Virginia Ruano Pascual – Cardiff (1)
- (United States) Chanda Rubin – Linz (1)
- (Japan) Naoko Sawamatsu – Jakarta (1)
- (Austria) Barbara Schett – Maria Lankowitz (1)
- (Netherlands) Brenda Schultz-McCarthy – Quebec City (1)
- (Japan) Ai Sugiyama – Tokyo (Tier III)
- (France) Nathalie Tauziat – Birmingham (1)
- (France) Sandrine Testud – Palermo (1)

The following players won their first title:

- (Austria) Marion Maruska – Auckland
- (United States) Chanda Rubin – Linz
- (Japan) Ai Sugiyama – Tokyo (Tier III)
- (Croatia) Mirjana Lučić – Bol
- (Spain) Virginia Ruano Pascual – Cardiff
- (France) Sandrine Testud – Palermo

List of titles won by country:

- Switzerland 12 – Sydney, Australian Open, Tokyo (Tier I), Paris, Miami, Hilton Head, Wimbledon, Stanford, San Diego, US Open, Filderstadt, Philadelphia
- USA 11 – Linz, Oklahoma City, Indian Wells, Amelia Island, Berlin, Los Angeles, Toronto, Atlanta, Tokyo (Tier II), Zurich, Chicago
- Croatia 4 – Hanover, Hamburg, Bol, French Open
- Czech Republic 4 – Madrid, Leipzig, Moscow, Season-Ending Championships
- Austria 3 – Auckland, Warsaw, Maria Lankowitz
- France 3 – Rome, Birmingham, Palermo
- South Africa 3 – Budapest, Prague, Luxembourg
- Belgium 2 – Hobart, Surabaya
- (Japan) 2 – Tokyo (Tier III), Jakarta
- (Germany) 1 – Strasbourg
- Russia 1 – Hope Island
- Netherlands 1 – Quebec City
- Romania 1 – Rosmalen
- Slovakia 1 – Pattaya
- (Spain) 1 – Cardiff

== Rankings ==
Below are the 1997 WTA year-end rankings in both singles and doubles competition:

Singles Year-end Ranking
No	Player Name	Points	1996	Change
1	Martina Hingis (SUI)	6,264	6	+5
2	Jana Novotná (CZE)	3,754	5	+3
3	Lindsay Davenport (USA)	3,696	9	+6
4	Amanda Coetzer (RSA)	3,360	14	+10
5	Monica Seles (USA)	2,988	2	-3
6	Iva Majoli (CRO)	2,874	8	+2
7	Mary Pierce (FRA)	2,861	24	+17
8	Irina Spîrlea (ROU)	2,577	10	+2
9	Arantxa Sánchez Vicario (ESP)	2,361	3	-6
10	Mary Joe Fernández (USA)	2,114	32	+19
11	Nathalie Tauziat (FRA)	2,003	16	+5
12	Conchita Martínez (ESP)	1988	4	-8
13	Sandrine Testud (FRA)	1,841	41	+28
14	Anke Huber (GER)	1,829	7	-7
15	Brenda Schultz-McCarthy (NED)	1,543	12	-3
16	Sabine Appelmans (BEL)	1,502	21	+5
17	Lisa Raymond (USA)	1,437	27	+10
18	Dominique Van Roost (BEL)	1,394	48	+30
19	Ruxandra Dragomir (ROM)	1,333	25	+6
20	Ai Sugiyama (JPN)	1,252	28	+8

Doubles Year-end Ranking
No	Player Name	Points	1996	Change
1	Natasha Zvereva (BLR)	5,435	9	+8
2	Lindsay Davenport (USA)	5,377	7	+5
3	Martina Hingis (SUI)	4,409	10	+7
4	Gigi Fernández (USA)	4,175	4	=
5	Arantxa Sánchez Vicario (ESP)	4,129	1	-4
6	Jana Novotná (CZE)	3,997	3	-3
7	Manon Bollegraf (NED)	3,982	15	+8
8	Nicole Arendt (USA)	3,720	11	+3
9	Larisa Neiland (LAT)	3,327	2	-7
10	Helena Suková (CZE)	3,046	6	-4
11	Caroline Vis (NED)	2,963	19	+8
12	Lisa Raymond (USA)	2,853	12	=
13	Nathalie Tauziat (FRA)	2,842	14	+1
14	Alexandra Fusai (FRA)	2,820	35	+21
15	Yayuk Basuki (INA)	2,721	20	+5
16	Mary Joe Fernández (USA)	2,463	5	-11
17	Patricia Tarabini (ARG)	2,322	30	+13
18	Nana Miyagi (JPN)	2,102	29	+11
19	Conchita Martínez (ESP)	1,928	28	+9
20	Naoko Kijimuta (JPN)	1,787	46	+26

== See also ==
- 1997 ATP Tour
