= 1992 Federation Cup World Group play-offs =

Women's tennis tournament results

The World Group play-offs for the 1992 Federation Cup was held from 16–17 July at the Waldstadion T.C. in Frankfurt, Germany, on clay courts.

The sixteen teams that were defeated in the first round of the World Group played off a two-stage knockout round, with the four teams winning two matches remaining in the World Group for 1993.

== Draw ==
First Round
Mexico	2
Indonesia	1
Belgium	1
South Africa	2
Hungary	3
Italy	0
Romania	1
Bulgaria	2

Play-off Round
Mexico	0
South Africa	3
Hungary	1
Bulgaria	2

First Round
Switzerland	3
Israel	0
Paraguay	3
New Zealand	0
Great Britain	3
Chile	0
Finland	2
China	1

Play-off Round
Switzerland	3
Paraguay	0
Great Britain	1
Finland	2

== First round ==
=== Mexico vs. Indonesia ===
Mexico
2
Waldstadion T.C., Frankfurt, Germany
16 July 1992
Clay (outdoors)

Indonesia
1

			1	2	3
1	(Mexico) (Indonesia)	Lupita Novelo; Romana Tedjakusuma	6; 3	7^{7} 6^{4}
2	(Mexico) (Indonesia)	Angélica Gavaldón; Yayuk Basuki	6; 4	0; 6	8; 6
3	(Mexico) (Indonesia)	Angélica Gavaldón / Lupita Novelo; Yayuk Basuki / Suzanna Anggarkusuma	5; 7	6; 3	2; 6

=== Belgium vs. South Africa ===
Belgium
1
Waldstadion T.C., Frankfurt, Germany
16 July 1992
Clay (outdoors)

South Africa
2

			1	2	3
1	(Belgium) (South Africa)	Dominique Monami; Elna Reinach	3; 6	1; 6
2	(Belgium) (South Africa)	Sabine Appelmans; Amanda Coetzer	6; 3	6; 3
3	(Belgium) (South Africa)	Sabine Appelmans / Sandra Wasserman; Mariaan de Swardt / Elna Reinach	0; 6	4; 6

=== Hungary vs. Italy ===
Hungary
3
Waldstadion T.C., Frankfurt, Germany
16 July 1992
Clay (outdoors)

Italy
0

			1	2	3
1	(Hungary) (Italy)	Anna Földényi; Raffaella Reggi	6; 3	4; 6	6; 4
2	(Hungary) (Italy)	Andrea Temesvári; Sandra Cecchini	6; 1	1; 0		retired
3	(Hungary) (Italy)	Virág Csurgó / Andrea Temesvári; Linda Ferrando / Laura Garrone	6; 3	6; 0

=== Romania vs. Bulgaria ===
Romania
1
Waldstadion T.C., Frankfurt, Germany
16 July 1992
Clay (outdoors)

Bulgaria
2

			1	2	3
1	(Romania) (Bulgaria)	Ruxandra Dragomir; Magdalena Maleeva	0; 6	1; 6
2	(Romania) (Bulgaria)	Irina Spîrlea; Katerina Maleeva	1; 6	0; 6
3	(Romania) (Bulgaria)	Ruxandra Dragomir / Irina Spîrlea; Magdalena Maleeva / Elena Pampoulova	7^{7} 6^{5}	6; 2

=== Switzerland vs. Israel ===
Switzerland
3
Waldstadion T.C., Frankfurt, Germany
16 July 1992
Clay (outdoors)

Israel
0

			1	2	3
1	(Switzerland) (Israel)	Christelle Fauche; Yael Segal	6; 1	6; 0
2	(Switzerland) (Israel)	Manuela Maleeva-Fragniere; Anna Smashnova	6; 1	6; 0
3	(Switzerland) (Israel)	Christelle Fauche / Emanuela Zardo; Anna Smashnova / Limor Zaltz	6; 3	6; 1

=== Paraguay vs. New Zealand ===
Paraguay
3
Waldstadion T.C., Frankfurt, Germany
16 July 1992
Clay (outdoors)

New Zealand
0

			1	2	3
1	(Paraguay) (New Zealand)	Larissa Schaerer; Hana Guy	3; 6	6; 2	6; 3
2	(Paraguay) (New Zealand)	Rossana de los Ríos; Julie Richardson	6; 3	6; 2
3	(Paraguay) (New Zealand)	Rossana de los Ríos / Viviana Valdovinos; Claudine Toleafoa / Amanda Trail	6; 1	6; 1

=== Great Britain vs. Chile ===
Great Britain
3
Waldstadion T.C., Frankfurt, Germany
16 July 1992
Clay (outdoors)

Chile
0

			1	2	3
1	(United Kingdom) (Chile)	Sara Gomer; Bárbara Castro	6; 2	6; 0
2	(United Kingdom) (Chile)	Jo Durie; Paula Cabezas	6^{5} 7^{7}	6; 0	6; 1
3	(United Kingdom) (Chile)	Sara Gomer / Clare Wood; Macarena Miranda / Paulina Sepúlveda	6; 3	6; 1

=== Finland vs. China ===
Finland
2
Waldstadion T.C., Frankfurt, Germany
16 July 1992
Clay (outdoors)

China
1

			1	2	3
1	(Finland) (China)	Nanne Dahlman; Chen Li-Ling	7; 5	7^{7} 6^{5}
2	(Finland) (China)	Petra Thorén; Li Fang	7; 5	3; 6	5; 7
3	(Finland) (China)	Anne Aallonen / Nanne Dahlman; Li Fang / Tang Min	2; 6	6; 2	6; 1

== Play-off Round ==
=== Mexico vs. South Africa ===
Mexico
0
Waldstadion T.C., Frankfurt, Germany
17 July 1992
Clay (outdoors)

South Africa
3

			1	2	3
1	(Mexico) (South Africa)	Lupita Novelo; Mariaan de Swardt	1; 6	6^{2} 7^{7}
2	(Mexico) (South Africa)	Angélica Gavaldón; Amanda Coetzer	2; 6	1; 6
3	(Mexico) (South Africa)	Angélica Gavaldón / Isabela Petrov; Mariaan de Swardt / Elna Reinach	0; 6	0; 6

=== Hungary vs. Bulgaria ===
Hungary
1
Waldstadion T.C., Frankfurt, Germany
17 July 1992
Clay (outdoors)

Bulgaria
2

			1	2	3
1	(Hungary) (Bulgaria)	Anna Földényi; Elena Pampoulova	6; 4	6; 2
2	(Hungary) (Bulgaria)	Andrea Temesvári; Katerina Maleeva	3; 6	4; 6
3	(Hungary) (Bulgaria)	Virág Csurgó / Kata Györke; Katerina Maleeva / Elena Pampoulova	6^{6} 7^{8}	6; 4	1; 6

=== Switzerland vs. Paraguay ===
Switzerland
3
Waldstadion T.C., Frankfurt, Germany
17 July 1992
Clay (outdoors)

Paraguay
0

			1	2	3
1	(Switzerland) (Paraguay)	Christelle Fauche; Larissa Schaerer	3; 6	6; 2	6; 1
2	(Switzerland) (Paraguay)	Manuela Maleeva-Fragniere; Rossana de los Ríos	6; 2	6; 2
3	(Switzerland) (Paraguay)	Michèle Strebel / Emanuela Zardo; Rossana de los Ríos / Viviana Valdovinos	6; 2	6; 2

=== Great Britain vs. Finland ===
Great Britain
1
Waldstadion T.C., Frankfurt, Germany
17 July 1992
Clay (outdoors)

Finland
2

			1	2	3
1	(United Kingdom) (Finland)	Sara Gomer; Nanne Dahlman	4; 6	0; 6
2	(United Kingdom) (Finland)	Jo Durie; Petra Thorén	3; 6	5; 7
3	(United Kingdom) (Finland)	Sara Gomer / Clare Wood; Anne Aallonen / Nanne Dahlman	6; 1	6; 4
