= 1998 Internazionali Femminili di Palermo =

- Date: 13–19 July
- Edition: 11th
- Category: Tier IV
- Draw: 32S / 16D
- Prize money: $107,500
- Surface: Clay / outdoor
- Location: Palermo, Italy

Champions

Singles
- (Switzerland) Patty Schnyder

Doubles
- (Bulgaria) Pavlina Stoyanova / (Germany) Elena Wagner
← 1997 ·	Internazionali Femminili di Palermo	· 1999 →

The 1998 Internazionali Femminili di Palermo was a women's tennis tournament played on outdoor clay courts in Palermo, Italy that was part of the Tier IV category of the 1998 WTA Tour. It was the 11th edition of the tournament and was held from 13 July until 19 July 1998. First-seeded Patty Schnyder won the singles title and earned $17,700 first-prize money.

== Finals ==
=== Singles ===
(Switzerland) Patty Schnyder defeated (Austria) Barbara Schett 6–1, 5–7, 6–2

- It was Schnyder's 5th singles title of the year and the 5th of her career.

=== Doubles ===
(Bulgaria) Pavlina Stoyanova / (Germany) Elena Wagner defeated (Austria) Barbara Schett / (Switzerland) Patty Schnyder 6–4, 6–2

- It was Stoyanova's only title of the year and the 1st of her career. It was Wagner's only title of the year and the 3rd of her career.
