= 1997 Internazionali Femminili di Palermo – Doubles =

Doubles
- 1997 Internazionali Femminili di Palermo
- 1996 Champions: (Slovakia) Janette Husárová (Austria) Barbara Schett

Final
- Champions: (Italy) Silvia Farina (Austria) Barbara Schett
- Runners-up: (Argentina) Florencia Labat (Argentina) Mercedes Paz
- Score: 2–6, 6–1, 6–4

Details
- Draw: 16
- Seeds: 4

Events
Singles	Doubles
← 1996 ·	Internazionali Femminili di Palermo	· 1998 →

Janette Husárová and Barbara Schett were the defending champions but only Schett competed that year with Silvia Farina.

Farina and Schett won in the final 2–6, 6–1, 6–4 against Florencia Labat and Mercedes Paz.

== Seeds ==
Champion seeds are indicated in bold text while text in italics indicates the round in which those seeds were eliminated.

1. (Italy) **Silvia Farina** / (Austria) **Barbara Schett (champions)**
2. (Argentina) Florencia Labat / (Argentina) Mercedes Paz (final)
3. (Argentina) Inés Gorrochategui / (France) Sandrine Testud (semifinals)
4. (Italy) Flora Perfetti / (Italy) Gloria Pizzichini (semifinals)

== Draw ==
=== Key ===
- Q = Qualifier
- WC = Wild card
- LL = Lucky loser
- Alt = Alternate
- ITF = ITF entry
- PR = Protected ranking
- SR = Special ranking
- SE = Special exempt
- JE = Junior exempt
- JR = Junior Accelerator Programme entrant
- CO = College Accelerator Programme entrant
- NG = Next Gen Accelerator Program entrant
- w/o = Walkover
- r = Retired
- d = Defaulted

First round
1	(Italy) **S Farina** (Austria) **B Schett**	**6**	4	**6**
(Argentina) L Montalvo (Spain) V Ruano-Pascual	3	**6**	2
(Italy) **S Cecchini** (Italy) **L Garrone**	3	**6**	**6**
Q	(Italy) Adriana Serra Zanetti (Italy) Antonella Serra Zanetti	**6**	4	3
3	(Argentina) **I Gorrochategui** (France) **S Testud**	**6**	**6**
(Russia) E Makarova (Germany) E Wagner	3	3
WC	(Switzerland) **E Gagliardi** (Italy) **F Lubiani**	**6**	**6**
(France) L Ghirardi (Austria) E Habeler	2	3
(Austria) S Dopfer (Germany) M Kochta	1	r
(Germany) **S Meier** (Germany) **S Schmidle**	**4**
(Germany) Adriana Barna (Germany) Anca Barna	3	3
4	(Italy) **F Perfetti** (Italy) **G Pizzichini**	**6**	**6**
(Austria) K Kschwendt (Czech Republic) L Němečková	5	2
LL	(Italy) **G Casoni** (Sweden) **K Triska**	**7**	**6**
(Belgium) S Devillé (Argentina) M-J Gaidano	3	3
2	(Argentina) **F Labat** (Argentina) **M Paz**	**6**	**6**

Quarterfinals
1	(Italy) **S Farina** (Austria) **B Schett**	**6**	**6**
(Italy) S Cecchini (Italy) L Garrone	4	1
3	(Argentina) **I Gorrochategui** (France) **S Testud**	**7**	**6**
WC	(Switzerland) E Gagliardi (Italy) F Lubiani	5	3
(Germany) S Meier (Germany) S Schmidle	1	**6**	2
4	(Italy) **F Perfetti** (Italy) **G Pizzichini**	**6**	4	**6**
LL	(Italy) G Casoni (Sweden) K Triska	3	0
2	(Argentina) **F Labat** (Argentina) **M Paz**	**6**	**6**

Semifinals
1	(Italy) **S Farina** (Austria) **B Schett**	3	**6**	**6**
3	(Argentina) I Gorrochategui (France) S Testud	**6**	4	3
4	(Italy) F Perfetti (Italy) G Pizzichini	3	4
2	(Argentina) **F Labat** (Argentina) **M Paz**	**6**	**6**

Final
1	(Italy) **Silvia Farina** (Austria) **Barbara Schett**	2	**6**	**6**
2	(Argentina) Florencia Labat (Argentina) Mercedes Paz	**6**	1	4
