= 1998 Internazionali Femminili di Palermo – Singles =

Singles
- 1998 Internazionali Femminili di Palermo

Final
- Champion: (Switzerland) Patty Schnyder
- Runner-up: (Austria) Barbara Schett
- Score: 6–1, 5–7, 6–2

Details
- Draw: 32
- Seeds: 8

Events
Singles	Doubles
- Internazionali Femminili di Palermo

Sandrine Testud was the defending champion but lost in the first round to Barbara Rittner.

Patty Schnyder won in the final 6–1, 5–7, 6–2 against Barbara Schett.

== Seeds ==
A champion seed is indicated in bold text while text in italics indicates the round in which that seed was eliminated.

1. (Switzerland) **Patty Schnyder (champion)**
2. (France) Sandrine Testud (first round)
3. (Spain) Magüi Serna (first round)
4. (Austria) Barbara Schett (final)
5. (Italy) Rita Grande (second round)
6. (Netherlands) Miriam Oremans (semifinals)
7. (Austria) Sylvia Plischke (first round)
8. (Russia) Tatiana Panova (first round)

== Draw ==
Key

- Q = Qualifier
- WC = Wild card
- LL = Lucky loser
- Alt = Alternate
- ITF = ITF entry
- PR = Protected ranking
- SR = Special ranking
- SE = Special exempt
- JE = Junior exempt
- JR = Junior Accelerator Programme entrant
- CO = College Accelerator Programme entrant
- NG = Next Gen Accelerator Program entrant
- w/o = Walkover
- r = Retired
- d = Defaulted

First round
1	(Switzerland) **P Schnyder**	**6**	**3**
(Netherlands) K Boogert	1	1	r
Q	(Italy) A Canepa	3	2
(France) **A D-Balleret**	**6**	**6**
Q	(Italy) **M P Zavagli**	**6**	**7**
(Italy) F Perfetti	3	5
(Italy) **S Cecchini**	**6**	**6**
7	(Austria) S Plischke	2	4
3	(Spain) M Serna	**6**	3	3
(Germany) **E Wagner**	2	**6**	**6**
(Argentina) M Díaz Oliva	2	4
(France) **A Cocheteux**	**6**	**6**
(Canada) **J Nejedly**	3	**7**	**7**
WC	(Sweden) K Triska	**6**	5	5
Q	(Spain) E Bes Ostariz	4	3
6	(Netherlands) **M Oremans**	**6**	**6**
8	(Russia) T Panova	**6**	1	4
(Austria) **M Maruska**	2	**6**	**6**
WC	(Italy) A Serra Zanetti	**7**	5	2
(Czech Republic) **R Bobková**	6	**7**	**6**
Q	(Italy) T Garbin	1	2
(Slovakia) **K Studeníková**	**6**	**6**
(Switzerland) E Gagliardi	0	3
4	(Austria) **B Schett**	**6**	**6**
5	(Italy) **R Grande**	**7**	**6**
(Italy) F Lubiani	6	2
(Czech Republic) L Němečková	1	4
(United States) **J Capriati**	**6**	**6**
(Germany) J Kandarr	**6**	0	2
(Bulgaria) **P Stoyanova**	4	**6**	**6**
(Germany) **B Rittner**	4	**5**
2	(France) S Testud	**6**	6	r

Second round
1	(Switzerland) **P Schnyder**	5	**6**	**6**
(France) A D-Balleret	**7**	4	0
Q	(Italy) **M P Zavagli**	**6**	4	**6**
(Italy) S Cecchini	1	**6**	1
(Germany) **E Wagner**	**6**	**7**
(France) A Cocheteux	4	5
(Canada) J Nejedly	1	6
6	(Netherlands) **M Oremans**	**6**	**7**
(Austria) M Maruska	4	**6**	5
(Czech Republic) **R Bobková**	**6**	1	**7**
(Slovakia) K Studeníková	0	2
4	(Austria) **B Schett**	**6**	**6**
5	(Italy) R Grande	**6**	2	0
(United States) **J Capriati**	4	**6**	**6**
(Bulgaria) P Stoyanova	1	3
(Germany) **B Rittner**	**6**	**6**

Quarterfinals
1	(Switzerland) **P Schnyder**	**6**	**6**
Q	(Italy) M P Zavagli	2	3
(Germany) E Wagner	0	2
6	(Netherlands) **M Oremans**	**6**	**6**
(Czech Republic) R Bobková	**6**	6	2
4	(Austria) **B Schett**	4	**7**	**6**
(United States) J Capriati	**6**	4	2
(Germany) **B Rittner**	2	**6**	**6**

Semifinals
1	(Switzerland) **P Schnyder**	**6**	**6**
6	(Netherlands) M Oremans	1	3
4	(Austria) **B Schett**	4	**6**	**6**
(Germany) B Rittner	**6**	4	4

Final
1	(Switzerland) **Patty Schnyder**	**6**	5	**6**
4	(Austria) Barbara Schett	1	**7**	2
