= 1998 Internazionali Femminili di Palermo – Doubles =

Doubles
- 1998 Internazionali Femminili di Palermo

Final
- Champions: (Bulgaria) Pavlina Stoyanova (Germany) Elena Wagner
- Runners-up: (Austria) Barbara Schett (Switzerland) Patty Schnyder
- Score: 6–4, 6–2

Details
- Draw: 16
- Seeds: 4

Events
Singles	Doubles
- Internazionali Femminili di Palermo

Silvia Farina and Barbara Schett were the reigning champions but only Schett competed that year with Patty Schnyder.

Schett and Schnyder lost in the final 6–4, 6–2 against Pavlina Stoyanova and Elena Wagner.

== Seeds ==
Champion seeds are indicated in bold text while text in italics indicates the round in which those seeds were eliminated.

1. (Austria) Barbara Schett / (Switzerland) Patty Schnyder (final)
2. (Netherlands) Kristie Boogert / (Netherlands) Miriam Oremans (quarterfinals)
3. (Czech Republic) Radka Bobková / (Germany) Caroline Schneider (first round)
4. (Bulgaria) **Pavlina Stoyanova** / (Germany) **Elena Wagner (champions)**

== Draw ==
Key

- Q = Qualifier
- WC = Wild card
- LL = Lucky loser
- Alt = Alternate
- ITF = ITF entry
- PR = Protected ranking
- SR = Special ranking
- SE = Special exempt
- JE = Junior exempt
- JR = Junior Accelerator Programme entrant
- CO = College Accelerator Programme entrant
- NG = Next Gen Accelerator Program entrant
- w/o = Walkover
- r = Retired
- d = Defaulted

First round
1	(Austria) **B Schett** (Switzerland) **P Schnyder**	**6**	**6**
(Italy) S Cecchini (Argentina) L Montalvo	2	2
(United States) M Mazzotta (Colombia) F Zuluaga	4	3
(Italy) **A Canepa** (Italy) **T Garbin**	**6**	**6**
3	(Czech Republic) R Bobková (Germany) C Schneider	1	4
(Paraguay) **L Schaerer** (Italy) **M P Zavagli**	**6**	**6**
(Switzerland) **E Gagliardi** (Italy) **A Serra Zanetti**	**6**	**6**
(France) A Dechaume-Balleret (Germany) B Rittner	1	0
(Austria) **S Plischke** (Sweden) **K Triska**	**6**	**6**
(Italy) G Casoni (Italy) F Perfetti	2	1
(Czech Republic) L Němečková (Slovakia) K Studeníková	2	2
4	(Bulgaria) **P Stoyanova** (Germany) **E Wagner**	**6**	**6**
(Croatia) **M Murić** (Greece) **C Papadáki**	**6**	**6**
(Argentina) G Aizenberg (Spain) E Bes Ostariz	2	4
Q	(Italy) L Dell'Angelo (Italy) F Schiavone	**7**	2	1
2	(Netherlands) **K Boogert** (Netherlands) **M Oremans**	5	**6**	**6**

Quarterfinals
1	(Austria) **B Schett** (Switzerland) **P Schnyder**	**w/o**
(Italy) A Canepa (Italy) T Garbin
(Paraguay) L Schaerer (Italy) M P Zavagli	3	2
(Switzerland) **E Gagliardi** (Italy) **A Serra Zanetti**	**6**	**6**
(Austria) S Plischke (Sweden) K Triska	4	4
4	(Bulgaria) **P Stoyanova** (Germany) **E Wagner**	**6**	**6**
(Croatia) **M Murić** (Greece) **C Papadáki**	**w/o**
2	(Netherlands) K Boogert (Netherlands) M Oremans

Semifinals
1	(Austria) **B Schett** (Switzerland) **P Schnyder**	**7**	**6**
(Switzerland) E Gagliardi (Italy) A Serra Zanetti	6	3
4	(Bulgaria) **P Stoyanova** (Germany) **E Wagner**	**6**	5	**6**
(Croatia) M Murić (Greece) C Papadáki	2	**7**	3

Final
1	(Austria) Barbara Schett (Switzerland) Patty Schnyder	4	2
4	(Bulgaria) **Pavlina Stoyanova** (Germany) **Elena Wagner**	**6**	**6**
