= Maria Paola Zavagli =

Italian tennis player

- Country (sports): Italy
- Born: 4 June 1977 (age 47); Bibbiena, Arezzo
- Plays: Right-handed
- Prize money: $113,050

Singles
- Career record: 174–177
- Career titles: 4 ITF
- Highest ranking: No. 161 (21 December 1998)

Doubles
- Career record: 96–91
- Career titles: 5 ITF
- Highest ranking: No. 125 (12 June 2000)

Grand Slam doubles results
- French Open: 2R (2000)
- Wimbledon: 1R (2000)

Maria Paola Zavagli (born 4 June 1977) is a former professional tennis player from Italy.

== Biography ==
Zavagli, a right-handed player, was born in the Tuscan town of Bibbiena. One of two sisters, her father is a doctor and her mother a teacher. She began playing tennis at the age of 10, under the tuition of her uncle.

As a junior, she twice won the doubles event at the Orange Bowl competition, with Alice Canepa in 1994, then partnering Giulia Casoni in 1995.

In 1997, she won three ITF singles titles and won two medals at the 1997 Mediterranean Games.

Her best performance on the WTA Tour was a quarterfinal appearance at the 1998 Internazionali Femminili di Palermo, with wins over Flora Perfetti and Sandra Cecchini.

She featured in the doubles main draws at both the 2000 French Open and 2000 Wimbledon Championships, partnering Slovak player Janette Husárová in each tournament.

== ITF Circuit finals ==
Legend
$50,000 tournaments
$25,000 tournaments
$10,000 tournaments

=== Singles: 6 (4 titles, 2 runner-ups) ===
Result	No.	Date	Tournament	Surface	Opponent	Score
Win	1.	Jan 1995	ITF İstanbul, Turkey	Hard	(Czech Republic) Jindra Gabrisová	7–5, 6–1
Win	2.	Feb 1997	ITF Mallorca, Spain	Clay	(Spain) Paula García	6–2, 6–2
Loss	3.	Jun 1997	ITF Sezze, Italy	Clay	(Romania) Andreea Ehritt-Vanc	4–6, 6–0, 2–6
Win	4.	Aug 1997	ITF Catania, Italy	Clay	(Italy) Laura Dell'Angelo	5–7, 7–6^{(1)}, 6–3
Win	5.	Dec 1997	ITF Espinho, Portugal	Clay	(Italy) Giulia Casoni	7–5, 7–6^{(8)}
Loss	6.	May 1998	ITF Midlothian, United States	Clay	(Greece) Christína Papadáki	5–7, 4–6

=== Doubles: 13 (5 titles, 8 runner-ups) ===
Result	No.	Date	Tournament	Surface	Partner	Opponents	Score
Win	1.	Aug 1994	ITF Koksijde, Belgium	Clay	(Italy) Francesca Lubiani	(Italy) Giulia Casoni (Italy) Sara Ventura	7–6^{(0)}, 7–5
Win	2.	Jul 1995	ITF İstanbul, Turkey	Hard	(Italy) Emanuela Brusati	(Japan) Yoriko Yamagishi (Czech Republic) Ludmila Varmužová	7–6^{(5)}, 6–3
Loss	3.	Apr 1997	ITF San Severo, Italy	Clay	(Romania) Andreea Ehritt-Vanc	(Italy) Sabina Da Ponte (Italy) Laura Dell'Angelo	4–6, 6–4, 4–6
Loss	4.	Jun 1997	ITF Camucia, Italy	Hard	(Italy) Antonella Serra Zanetti	(Italy) Cristina Salvi (Romania) Andreea Ehritt-Vanc	4–6, 1–6
Win	5.	Dec 1997	ITF Espinho, Portugal	Clay	(Italy) Giulia Casoni	(Spain) Tamara Aranda (Spain) Julia Carballal	6–2, 6–4
Loss	6.	Nov 1998	ITF Hull, United Kingdom	Hard (i)	(Italy) Francesca Lubiani	(Austria) Barbara Schwartz (Germany) Jasmin Wöhr	2–6, 3–6
Loss	7.	Apr 1999	ITF Espinho, Portugal	Clay	(Italy) Francesca Lubiani	(Hungary) Katalin Marosi (Spain) Alicia Ortuño	3–6, 4–6
Loss	8.	Jun 1999	ITF Galatina, İtaly	Clay	(Italy) Giulia Casoni	(Argentina) Mariana Díaz Oliva (Argentina) Erica Krauth	1–6, 3–6
Win	9.	Apr 2000	ITF Maglie, Italy	Clay	(Italy) Alice Canepa	(Bulgaria) Svetlana Krivencheva (Belarus) Tatiana Poutchek	6–1, 6–4
Win	10.	Jul 2000	ITF Darmstadt, Germany	Clay	(Slovenia) Maja Matevžič	(Germany) Adriana Barna (Ukraine) Anna Zaporozhanova	7–6^{(4)}, 6–7^{(4)}, 6–4
Loss	11.	Sep 2000	ITF Reggio di Calabria, Italy	Clay	(Romania) Andreea Ehritt-Vanc	(Ukraine) Tatiana Kovalchuk (Germany) Syna Schmidle	w/o
Loss	12.	Sep 2001	ITF Lecce, Italy	Clay	(Italy) Andreea Ehritt-Vanc	(Spain) Mariam Ramón Climent (Germany) Angelika Rösch	6–7^{(6)}, 6–7^{(6)}
Loss	13.	Oct 2001	Open de Touraine, France	Hard (i)	(Italy) Flavia Pennetta	(Madagascar) Dally Randriantefy (Madagascar) Natacha Randriantefy	4–6, 6–3, 3–6
