= Elena Pampoulova =

Bulgarian tennis player (1972–2023)

Elena Pampoulova Елена Пампулова
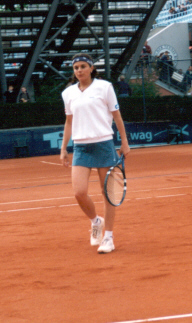
- Elena Wagner (2006)
- Country (sports): Bulgaria (1972–1996); Germany (1997–2001)
- Born: 17 May 1972 Sofia, Bulgaria
- Died: 19 April 2023 (aged 50)
- Turned pro: 1988
- Retired: 2001
- Prize money: US$ 704,882

Singles
- Career record: 243–179
- Career titles: 1
- Highest ranking: No. 62 (9 September 1996)

Grand Slam singles results
- Australian Open: 2R (1990, 1998, 1999)
- French Open: 2R (1990, 1998, 1999)
- Wimbledon: 3R (1999)
- US Open: 3R (1997)

Other tournaments
- Olympic Games: 1R (1992)

Doubles
- Career record: 163–146
- Career titles: 3
- Highest ranking: No. 38 (23 September 1996)

Grand Slam doubles results
- Australian Open: 2R (1995, 1998)
- French Open: 3R (1990, 1996, 1999)
- Wimbledon: 2R (1997)
- US Open: 2R (1995)

Grand Slam mixed doubles results
- French Open: 1R (1997)

Team competitions
- Fed Cup: 8–8 (singles 5–6)

Elena Pampoulova (also Elena Wagner, Elena Pampoulova-Bergomi, Bulgarian: Елена Пампулова; 17 May 1972 – 19 April 2023) was a Bulgarian tennis player. In her career, she won one singles title and three doubles titles on the WTA Tour.

Her tennis career spanned from 1988 to 2001. Pampoulova's career-high singles ranking is world No. 62, her best doubles ranking is No. 38, both achieved in September 1996.

== Tennis career ==
Pampoulova played for Bulgaria and the Bulgaria Fed Cup team from 1988 to 1992. Pampoulova was one of only three players to represent Bulgaria in tennis at the 1992 Olympics in Barcelona (together with Katerina Maleeva and Magdalena Maleeva).

From 1997 to 1999, Elena played for the Germany Fed Cup team. She won 13 career titles in singles (one WTA Tour) and 11 titles in doubles (three of them from WTA Tour).

Her first tennis coach was her own mother, Bulgarian tennis player Lubka Radkova. Elena's father, Emilian Pampoulov, is also a tennis player.

== Personal life ==
On 11 July 2006, Pampoulova married her long-time boyfriend, Swiss banker Christian Bergomi. Their son Alex was born in early 2008. The couple lived in Switzerland, where Elena was an asset manager. In June 2022 she was found guilty of money laundering offences together with Credit Suisse and three other defendants. Prior to the trial, Credit Suisse unreservedly rejected as meritless all allegations raised against her and [was] convinced that she [was] innocent. Both the bank and Pampoulova announced their intentions to appeal the court decision.

Pampoulova died on 19 April 2023, at the age of 50 after an illness.

== WTA Tour finals ==
=== Singles: 2 (1 title, 1 runner–up) ===
Legend Tier I Tier II Tier III Tier IV (1–1)	Finals by surface Hard (1–0) Clay (0–1) Grass (0–0) Carpet (0–0)

Result	W–L	Date	Tournament	Tier	Surface	Opponent	Score
Win	1–0	Nov 1994	Surabaya Classic, Indonesia	Tier IV	Hard	(Japan) Ai Sugiyama	2–6, 6–0, ret.
Loss	1–1	Aug 1998	Sopot Open, Poland	Tier IV	Clay	(Slovakia) Henrieta Nagyová	3–6, 7–5, 1–6

=== Doubles: 8 (3 titles, 5 runner-ups) ===
Legend Tier II Tier III (1–0) Tier IV (2–3) Tier V (0–2)	Finals by surface Hard (0–1) Clay (3–4) Grass (0–0) Carpet (0–0)

Result	W–L	Date	Tournament	Tier	Surface	Partner	Opponents	Score
Loss	0–1	Aug 1989	Sofia Open, Bulgaria	Tier V	Clay	(West Germany) Silke Meier	(Italy) Laura Garrone (Italy) Laura Golarsa	4–6, 5–7
Loss	0–2	Sep 1989	Athens Trophy, Greece	Tier V	Clay	(West Germany) Silke Meier	(Italy) Sandra Cecchini (Argentina) Patricia Tarabini	6–4, 4–6, 2–6
Loss	0–3	Sep 1996	Karlovy Vary, Czech Republic	Tier IV	Clay	(Czech Republic) Eva Martincová	(Slovakia) Karina Habšudová (Czech Republic) Helena Suková	6–3, 3–6, 2–6
Win	1–3	Sep 1996	Warsaw Open, Poland	Tier III	Clay	(Ukraine) Olga Lugina	(France) Alexandra Fusai (Italy) Laura Garrone	1–6, 6–4, 7–5
Loss	1–4	Jan 1997	Auckland Open, New Zealand	Tier IV	Hard	(Poland) Aleksandra Olsza	(Slovakia) Janette Husárová (Belgium) Dominique Monami	2–6, 7–6^{(7–5)}, 3–6
Loss	1–5	Apr 1997	Hungarian Ladies Open, Hungary	Tier IV	Clay	(Czech Republic) Eva Martincová	(South Africa) Amanda Coetzer (France) Alexandra Fusai	3–6, 1–6
Win	2–5	Jul 1998	Palermo Ladies Open, Italy	Tier IV	Clay	(Bulgaria) Pavlina Nola	(Austria) Barbara Schett (Switzerland) Patty Schnyder	6–4, 6–2
Win	3–5	Aug 1999	Knokke-Heist, Belgium	Tier IV	Clay	(Czech Republic) Eva Martincová	(Russia) Evgenia Kulikovskaya (Federal Republic of Yugoslavia) Sandra Načuk	3–6, 6–3, 6–3

== ITF Circuit finals ==
=== Singles: 14 (12 titles, 2 runner–ups) ===
Legend $75,000 tournaments $50,000 tournaments $25,000 tournaments $10,000 tournaments	Finals by surface Hard (6–0) Clay (5–1) Carpet (1–1)

Result	W–L	Date	Tournament	Tier	Surface	Opponent	Score
Win	1–0	Oct 1988	ITF Baden, Switzerland	10,000	Hard (i)	(Poland) Katarzyna Nowak	6–1, 6–1
Win	2–0	Dec 1988	ITF Melbourne, Australia	10,000	Hard	(Mexico) Xóchitl Escobedo	7–6^{(7–3)}, 6–2
Win	3–0	May 1989	ITF Athens, Greece	10,000	Clay	(Bulgaria) Dora Rangelova	6–1, 6–7, 6–1
Win	4–0	Jul 1989	ITF Erlangen, West Germany	25,000	Clay	(West Germany) Wiltrud Probst	6–1, 2–6, 6–3
Win	5–0	Aug 1989	ITF Budapest, Hungary	25,000	Clay	(West Germany) Silke Frankl	6–4, 6–7, 6–0
Win	6–0	Jul 1990	ITF Stuttgart-Vaihingen, West Germany	25,000	Clay	(Czechoslovakia) Denisa Krajčovičová	6–3, 6–3
Loss	6–1	Nov 1992	ITF Nottingham, UK	25,000	Carpet (i)	(Russia) Elena Makarova	6–3, 2–6, 5–7
Loss	6–2	Mar 1994	ITF Reims, France	25,000	Clay (i)	(France) Catherine Mothes-Jobkel	1–6, 2–6
Win	7–2	Oct 1994	ITF Jakarta, Indonesia	50,000	Clay	(Japan) Hiromi Nagano	6–4, 6–1
Win	8–2	Dec 1995	Open de Limoges, France	50,000	Hard (i)	(Spain) Paula Hermida	7–5, 6–3
Win	9–2	Feb 1996	ITF Redbridge, UK	25,000	Hard (i)	(Japan) Haruka Inoue	6–4, 6–4
Win	10–2	Mar 1996	ITF Southampton, UK	50,000	Carpet (i)	(France) Isabelle Demongeot	6–3, 4–6, 6–4
Win	11–2	Apr 1996	ITF Murcia, Spain	75,000	Clay	(Switzerland) Patty Schnyder	6–4, 6–3
Win	12–2	Mar 1998	ITF Woodlands, United States	25,000	Hard	(Israel) Anna Smashnova	2–6, 6–1, 7–5

=== Doubles: 13 (8 titles, 5 runner–ups) ===
Legend $75,000 tournaments $50,000 tournaments $25,000 tournaments $10,000 tournaments	Finals by surface Hard (3–2) Clay (3–2) Carpet (2–1)

Result	W–L	Date	Tournament	Tier	Surface	Partner	Opponents	Score
Loss	0–1	Dec 1988	ITF Melbourne, Australia	10,000	Hard	(Australia) Kristin Godridge	(Australia) Natalia Leipus (Australia) Bernadette Randall	4–6, 7–6^{(7–5)}, 2–6
Win	1–1	Apr 1989	ITF Bari, Italy	10,000	Clay	(Austria) Marion Maruska	(Hungary) Andrea Noszály (West Germany) Eva-Maria Schürhoff	w/o
Win	2–1	Jun 1992	ITF Modena, Italy	25,000	Clay	(Romania) Ruxandra Dragomir	(France) Alexandra Fusai (Switzerland) Natalie Tschan	6–3, 7–6^{(7–5)}
Loss	2–2	Jul 1992	ITF Stuttgart-Vaihingen, Germany	25,000	Clay	(South Africa) Joannette Kruger	(Czechoslovakia) Eva Martincová (Czechoslovakia) Pavlína Rajzlová	4–6, 0–6
Loss	2–3	Nov 1992	ITF Manchester, UK	25,000	Carpet (i)	(Switzerland) Natalie Tschan	(Russia) Elena Likhovtseva (Russia) Elena Makarova	3–6, 4–6
Win	3–3	Nov 1992	ITF Nottingham, UK	25,000	Carpet (i)	(Belgium) Els Callens	(Romania) Ruxandra Dragomir (Romania) Irina Spîrlea	7–6^{(7–3)}, 6–4
Win	4–3	Apr 1993	Open de Limoges, France	25,000	Carpet (i)	(Italy) Silvia Farina Elia	(United States) Stephanie Reece (United States) Danielle Scott	6–2, 6–7^{(5–7)}, 6–2
Win	5–3	Oct 1993	ITF Poitiers, France	25,000	Hard (i)	(Ukraine) Olga Lugina	(Belgium) Els Callens (Belgium) Nancy Feber	6–4, 3–6, 6–3
Win	6–3	Dec 1994	ITF Cergy-Pontoise, France	50,000	Hard (i)	(France) Angelique Olivier	(Czech Republic) Kateřina Sisková (Czech Republic) Eva Melicharová	6–1, 6–4
Win	7–3	Oct 1995	ITF Lakeland, United States	50,000	Hard	(Czech Republic) Eva Martincová	(United States) Sandra Cacic (Australia) Tracey Morton-Rodgers	1–6, 6–2, 6–1
Loss	7–4	Dec 1995	Open de Limoges, France	50,000	Hard (i)	(Czech Republic) Eva Martincová	(Czech Republic) Eva Melicharová (Czech Republic) Helena Vildová	3–6, 6–0, 4–6
Win	8–4	Aug 1997	Makarska International, Croatia	75,000	Clay	(Ukraine) Olga Lugina	(Russia) Maria Goloviznina (Russia) Evgenia Kulikovskaya	5–7, 7–5, 7–5
Loss	8–5	Apr 1998	ITF Prostějov, Czech Republic	75,000	Clay	(Ukraine) Olga Lugina	(Czech Republic) Lenka Cenková (Czech Republic) Kateřina Sisková	4–6, 6–4, 4–6

== Fed Cup ==
Elena Pampoulova debuted for the Bulgaria Fed Cup team in 1988. She has a 5–6 singles record and a 3–2 doubles record (8–8 overall).

=== Singles (5–6) ===
Edition	Round	Date	Against	Surface	Opponent	W/L	Result
1988 World Group I	QR	4 December 1988	Philippines	Hard	(Philippines) Sarah Rafael	W	6–3, 6–2
1988 World Group I	R1	5 December 1988	Sweden	Hard	(Sweden) Catarina Lindqvist	L	5–7, 3–6
1988 World Group I	PO	6 December 1988	Malta	Hard	(Malta) Carol Cassar-Torreggiani	W	7–6^{(7–5)}, 6–3
1988 World Group I	PO	7 December 1988	Netherlands	Hard	(Netherlands) Brenda Schultz-McCarthy	L	6–4, 6–7^{(5–7)}, 5–7
1990 World Group I	QR	21 July 1990	Philippines	Hard	(Philippines) Sarah Castillejo	W	6–2, 6–0
1990 World Group I	R1	22 July 1990	Austria	Hard	(Austria) Judith Wiesner	L	0–6, 0–6
1990 World Group I	PO	23 July 1990	Norway	Hard	(Norway) Amy Jonsson-Råholt	W	6–4, 6–3
1990 World Group I	PO	24 July 1990	Brazil	Hard	(Brazil) Cláudia Chabalgoity	L	2–6, 6–2, 4–6
1992 World Group I play-offs	PO	17 July 1992	Hungary	Clay	(Hungary) Anna Földényi	L	4–6, 2–6
↓ Representing Germany ↓
1999 World Group II	QF	24 April 1999	Japan	Clay	(Japan) Shinobu Asagoe	L	6–7^{(6–8)}, 1–6
1999 World Group II	QF	25 April 1999	Japan	Clay	(Japan) Miho Saeki	W	7–6^{(10–8)}, 6–3

=== Doubles (3–2) ===
Edition	Round	Date	Partner	Against	Surface	Opponents	W/L	Result
1988 World Group I	R1	5 December 1988	(Bulgaria) Galia Angelova	Sweden	Hard	(Sweden) Jonna Jonerup (Sweden) Maria Lindström	L	6–2, 6–7^{(5–7)}, 1–6
1990 World Group I	PO	23 July 1990	(Bulgaria) Dora Rangelova	Norway	Hard	(Norway) Amy Jonsson-Råholt (Norway) Astrid Sunde	W	4–6, 6–2, 6–3
1992 World Group I play-offs	RPO	16 July 1992	(Bulgaria) Magdalena Maleeva	Romania	Hard	(Romania) Ruxandra Dragomir (Romania) Irina Spîrlea	L	6–7^{(5–7)}, 2–6
1992 World Group I play-offs	RPO	17 July 1992	(Bulgaria) Katerina Maleeva	Hungary	Hard	(Hungary) Virág Csurgó (Hungary) Kata Györke	W	7–6^{(8–6)}, 4–6, 6–1
↓ Representing Germany ↓
1997 World Group I	QF	2 March 1997	(Germany) Barbara Rittner	Czech Republic	Hard (I)	(Czech Republic) Eva Martincová (Czech Republic) Ludmila Richterová	W	7–6^{(7–3)}, 6–2

== Grand Slam singles performance timeline ==
Key
W	F	SF	QF	#R	RR	Q#	DNQ	A	NH

(W) winner; (F) finalist; (SF) semifinalist; (QF) quarterfinalist; (#R) rounds 4, 3, 2, 1; (RR) round-robin stage; (Q#) qualification round; (DNQ) did not qualify; (A) absent; (NH) not held; (SR) strike rate (events won / competed); (W–L) win–loss record.

Tournament	1988	1989	1990	1991	1992	1993	1994	1995	1996	1997	1998	1999	2000	2001	Career W–L
Australian Open	A	A	2R	A	A	A	A	1R	A	1R	2R	2R	A	A	3–5
French Open	A	A	2R	1R	A	Q1	Q1	1R	1R	1R	2R	2R	Q3	A	3–7
Wimbledon	A	A	A	2R	A	A	A	1R	1R	A	1R	3R	A	A	3–5
US Open	A	A	1R	A	A	A	A	1R	2R	3R	1R	1R	A	A	3–6
Win–loss	0–0	0–0	2–3	1–2	0–0	0–0	0–0	0–4	1–3	2–3	2–4	4–4	0–0	0–0	12–23
