= 1999 Warsaw Cup by Heros =

- Date: 3–9 May
- Edition: 5th
- Category: Tier IVb
- Draw: 32S / 16D
- Prize money: $112,500
- Surface: Clay / outdoor
- Location: Warsaw, Poland
- Venue: Warszawianka Courts

Champions

Singles
- (Spain) Cristina Torrens Valero

Doubles
- (Romania) Cătălina Cristea / (Kazakhstan) Irina Selyutina
← 1998 ·	Warsaw Cup by Heros	· 2000 →

The 1999 Warsaw Cup by Heros was a tennis tournament played on outdoor clay courts in Warsaw, Poland that was part of Tier IVb of the 1999 WTA Tour. The tournament was held from 3 May until 9 May 1999. Cristina Torrens Valero won the singles title.

== Finals ==
=== Singles ===
(Spain) Cristina Torrens Valero defeated (Argentina) Inés Gorrochategui, 7–5, 7–6^{(7–3)}

- It was Torrens Valero's first title of the year and her career, after having reached her first final a fortnight earlier.

=== Doubles ===
(Romania) Cătălina Cristea / (Kazakhstan) Irina Selyutina defeated (France) Amélie Cocheteux / (Slovakia) Janette Husárová, 6–1, 6–2

== Entrants ==
=== Seeds ===
Country	Player	Rank	Seed
AUT	Barbara Schett	20	1
FRA	Julie Halard-Decugis	21	2
SVK	Henrieta Nagyová	24	3
FRA	Amélie Cocheteux	57	4
USA	Jane Chi	62	5
FRA	Émilie Loit	63	6
USA	Meghann Shaughnessy	64	7
ROU	Cătălina Cristea	68	8

=== Other entrants ===
The following players received wildcards into the singles main draws:

- (France) Karolina Jagieniak
- (Australia) Jelena Dokić

The following players received entry from the singles qualifying draw:

- (Spain) Rosa María Andrés Rodríguez
- (Kazakhstan) Irina Selyutina
- (Slovenia) Tina Pisnik
- (Argentina) Inés Gorrochategui

The following players received entry from the doubles qualifying draw:

- (Slovenia) Tina Pisnik / (Croatia) Silvija Talaja
