= 1999 Warsaw Cup by Heros – Singles =

Singles
- 1999 Warsaw Cup by Heros
- 1998 Champion: (Spain) Conchita Martínez

Final
- Champion: (Spain) Cristina Torrens Valero
- Runner-up: (Argentina) Inés Gorrochategui
- Score: 7–5, 7–6^{(7–3)}

Details
- Draw: 32
- Seeds: 8

Events
Singles	Doubles
← 1998 ·	Warsaw Cup by Heros	· 2000 →

The 1999 Warsaw Cup by Heros singles was the singles event of the fifth edition of the Warsaw Open; a WTA Tier IV tournament held in Warsaw, Poland. Conchita Martínez won the tournament last year when it was a Tier III event. She did not compete this year.

Cristina Torrens Valero won her first WTA tournament, defeating Inés Gorrochategui in the final 7–5, 7–6^{(7–3)}.

== Seeds ==
1. (Austria) Barbara Schett (second round)
2. (France) Julie Halard-Decugis (second round, withdrew)
3. (Slovakia) Henrieta Nagyová (quarterfinals)
4. (France) Amélie Cocheteux (quarterfinals)
5. (United States) Jane Chi (first round)
6. (France) Émilie Loit (first round)
7. (United States) Meghann Shaughnessy (first round)
8. (Romania) Cătălina Cristea (second round)

== Draw ==
=== Key ===
- Q = Qualifier
- WC = Wild card
- LL = Lucky loser
- Alt = Alternate
- SE = Special exempt
- PR = Protected ranking
- ITF = ITF entry
- JE = Junior exempt
- w/o = Walkover
- r = Retired
- d = Defaulted
- SR = Special ranking

=== Finals ===
Semifinals
(Croatia) Silvija Talaja	6	2	2
(Spain) Cristina Torrens Valero	3	6	6
Q	(Slovenia) Tina Pisnik	0	5
Q	(Argentina) Inés Gorrochategui	6	7

Final
(Spain) Cristina Torrens Valero	7	7^{7}
Q	(Argentina) Inés Gorrochategui	5	6^{3}

=== Top half ===
First round
1	(Austria) B Schett	6	6
WC	(France) K Jagieniak	1	1
(Sweden) Å Carlsson	6	6^{3}	1
(Belarus) O Barabanschikova	2	7^{7}	6
(Croatia) S Talaja	6	6
(Germany) P Begerow	1	2
Q	(Spain) RM Andrés Rodríguez	6	7
5	(United States) J Chi	2	5
4	(France) A Cocheteux	7^{7}	3	6
(Netherlands) A Hopmans	6^{3}	6	0
(Slovakia) K Studeníková	6	6
Q	(Kazakhstan) I Selyutina	4	2
(Romania) R Sandu	3	4
(Bulgaria) P Stoyanova	6	6
(Spain) C Torrens Valero	7^{7}	6
7	(United States) M Shaughnessy	6^{0}	2

Second round
1	(Austria) B Schett	6	5	0
(Belarus) O Barabanschikova	2	7	6
(Croatia) S Talaja	3	6	6
Q	(Spain) RM Andrés Rodríguez	6	2	0
4	(France) A Cocheteux	6	6
(Slovakia) K Studeníková	0	3
(Bulgaria) P Stoyanova	7	2	4
(Spain) C Torrens Valero	5	6	6

Quarterfinals
(Belarus) O Barabanschikova	2	6^{10}
(Croatia) S Talaja	6	7^{12}
4	(France) A Cocheteux	4	3
(Spain) C Torrens Valero	6	6

Semifinals
(Croatia) S Talaja	6	2	2
(Spain) C Torrens Valero	3	6	6

=== Bottom half ===
First round
6	(France) É Loit	6^{4}	6	1
(Argentina) M Díaz Oliva	7^{7}	4	6
Q	(Slovenia) T Pisnik	6	6^{1}	6
(Hungary) R Kuti-Kis	3	7^{7}	4
(Federal Republic of Yugoslavia) S Naćuk	6	6
(Canada) J Nejedly	0	3
(Slovakia) J Husárová	1	4
3	(Slovakia) H Nagyová	6	6
8	(Romania) C Cristea	6	4	7
(Poland) A Olsza	2	6	5
(Chinese Taipei) J Lee	1	2
Q	(Argentina) I Gorrochategui	6	6
WC	(Australia) J Dokić	3	7	6
(Switzerland) E Gagliardi	6	5	4
(Germany) E Wagner	6^{4}	2
2	(France) J Halard-Decugis	7^{7}	6

Second round
(Argentina) M Díaz Oliva	2	5
Q	(Slovenia) T Pisnik	6	7
(Federal Republic of Yugoslavia) S Naćuk	6	1	4
3	(Slovakia) H Nagyová	1	6	6
8	(Romania) C Cristea	6	2	2
Q	(Argentina) I Gorrochategui	4	6	6
WC	(Australia) J Dokić	w/o
2	(France) J Halard-Decugis

Quarterfinals
Q	(Slovenia) T Pisnik	6	6
3	(Slovakia) H Nagyová	4	4
Q	(Argentina) I Gorrochategui	6	4	6
(Australia) J Dokić	4	6	2

Semifinals
Q	(Slovenia) T Pisnik	0	5
Q	(Argentina) I Gorrochategui	6	7

== Qualifying ==
=== Seeds ===
1. (Argentina) Inés Gorrochategui (Qualifier)
2. (Kazakhstan) Irina Selyutina (Qualifier)
3. (Spain) Rosa María Andrés Rodríguez (Qualifier)
4. (United Kingdom) Lucie Ahl (first round)
5. (Czech Republic) Eva Martincová (second round)
6. (Czech Republic) Michaela Paštiková (first round, withdrew)
7. (Czech Republic) Zuzana Ondrášková (first round, retired)
8. (Slovenia) Tina Pisnik (Qualifier)

=== Qualifiers ===
1. (Argentina) Inés Gorrochategui
2. (Slovenia) Tina Pisnik
3. (Spain) Rosa María Andrés Rodríguez
4. (Kazakhstan) Irina Selyutina

== Qualifying draw ==
=== Key ===
- Q = Qualifier
- WC = Wild card
- LL = Lucky loser
- Alt = Alternate
- SE = Special exempt
- PR = Protected ranking
- ITF = ITF entry
- JE = Junior exempt
- w/o = Walkover
- r = Retired
- d = Defaulted
- SR = Special ranking

=== First qualifier ===
First round
1	(Argentina) Inés Gorrochategui
Bye
WC	(Poland) Joanna Sakowicz	6	6
(Poland) Anną Dolińską	2	0
(Poland) Agata Cioroch	3	0
(Argentina) María José Gaidano	6	6
WC	(Poland) Paulina Janus	2	2
5	(Czech Republic) Eva Martincová	6	6

Second round
1	(Argentina) Inés Gorrochategui	6	6
WC	(Poland) Joanna Sakowicz	2	0
(Argentina) María José Gaidano	7^{7}	1	6
5	(Czech Republic) Eva Martincová	6^{3}	6	3

Qualifying competition
1	(Argentina) Inés Gorrochategui	6	6
(Argentina) María José Gaidano	3	1

=== Second qualifier ===
First round
4	(United Kingdom) Lucie Ahl	4	4
(Czech Republic) Zuzana Hejdová	6	6
(Poland) Anna Żarska	6	6
WC	(Poland) Patrycja Bandurowska	2	0
(Australia) Amanda Grahame	6	6
(Russia) Maria Goloviznina	4	2
WC	(Sweden) Aleksandra Srndovic	4	2
8	(Slovenia) Tina Pisnik	6	6

Second round
(Czech Republic) Zuzana Hejdová	6	4	6^{3}
(Poland) Anna Żarska	2	6	7^{7}
(Australia) Amanda Grahame	4	1
8	(Slovenia) Tina Pisnik	6	6

Qualifying competition
(Poland) Anna Żarska	2	2
8	(Slovenia) Tina Pisnik	6	6

=== Third qualifier ===
First round
7	(Czech Republic) Zuzana Ondrášková	0^{r}
WC	(Croatia) Lana Miholček	5
(Czech Republic) Gabriela Navrátilová	6	6
WC	(Poland) Agata Kurowska	3	2
(United Kingdom) Joanne Moore	3	5
(Poland) Katarzyna Strączy	6	7
Bye
3	(Spain) Rosa María Andrés Rodríguez

Second round
WC	(Croatia) Lana Miholček	6	6
(Czech Republic) Gabriela Navrátilová	3	2
(Poland) Katarzyna Strączy	3	7	4
3	(Spain) Rosa María Andrés Rodríguez	6	5	6

Qualifying competition
WC	(Croatia) Lana Miholček	2	5
3	(Spain) Rosa María Andrés Rodríguez	6	7

=== Fourth qualifier ===
First round
6	(Czech Republic) Michaela Paštiková
(Poland) Agnieszka Abram	w/o
(Australia) Louise Pleming	6	6
(Poland) Emilia Kopczyńska	0	0
(Hungary) Zsófia Gubacsi	6	7
(Poland) Anna Mogilnicka	3	5
Bye
2	(Kazakhstan) Irina Selyutina

Second round
(Poland) Agnieszka Abram	4	6	4
(Australia) Louise Pleming	6	4	6
(Hungary) Zsófia Gubacsi	1	4
2	(Kazakhstan) Irina Selyutina	6	6

Qualifying competition
(Australia) Louise Pleming	0	1
2	(Kazakhstan) Irina Selyutina	6	6
