= 1998 Warsaw Cup by Heros – Doubles =

Doubles
- 1998 Warsaw Cup by Heros

Final
- Champions: (Slovakia) Karina Habšudová (Ukraine) Olga Lugina
- Runners-up: (South Africa) Liezel Horn (Austria) Karin Kschwendt
- Score: 7–6^{(7–2)}, 7–5

Details
- Draw: 16
- Seeds: 4

Events
Singles	Doubles
← 1997 ·	Warsaw Open	· 1999 →

Ruxandra Dragomir and Inés Gorrochategui were the defending champions of the Warsaw Cup by Heros, a tennis tournament, but did not compete in 1998.

Karina Habšudová and Olga Lugina won in the final 7–6^{(7–2)}, 7–5 against Liezel Horn and Karin Kschwendt.

== Seeds ==
Champion seeds are indicated in bold text while text in italics indicates the round in which those seeds were eliminated.

1. (Belgium) Sabine Appelmans / (Italy) Silvia Farina (first round)
2. (Romania) Cătălina Cristea / (Czech Republic) Eva Melicharová (quarterfinals)
3. (Germany) Meike Babel / (Germany) Wiltrud Probst (semifinals)
4. (Slovakia) **Karina Habšudová** / (Ukraine) **Olga Lugina (champions)**

== Draw ==
=== Key ===
- Q = Qualifier
- WC = Wild card
- LL = Lucky loser
- Alt = Alternate
- SE = Special exempt
- PR = Protected ranking
- ITF = ITF entry
- JE = Junior exempt
- w/o = Walkover
- r = Retired
- d = Defaulted
- SR = Special ranking

First round
1	(Belgium) S Appelmans (Italy) S Farina
(South Africa) **L Horn** (Austria) **K Kschwendt**	**w/o**
(Spain) **M Escobar** (Spain) **C Martínez Granados**	**6**	3	**6**
(South Korea) E-H Kim (Poland) A Olsza	4	**6**	3
3	(Germany) **M Babel** (Germany) **W Probst**	**6**	**6**
Q	(Czech Republic) S Kleinová (Russia) N Petrova	1	4
(Belarus) O Barabanschikova (Poland) M Grzybowska	6	6
(Sweden) **Å Carlsson** (Netherlands) **S Noorlander**	**7**	**7**
(Czech Republic) **E Martincová** (Czech Republic) **H Vildová**	**6**	**6**
(United States) R Jensen (Australia) D Jones	3	4
(Russia) E Kulikovskaya (Federal Republic of Yugoslavia) S Načuk	**7**	1	6
4	(Slovakia) **K Habšudová** (Ukraine) **O Lugina**	6	**6**	**7**
(Bulgaria) **S Krivencheva** (Czech Republic) **P Langrová**	3	**6**	**6**
WC	(Poland) M Feistel (Poland) K Teodorowicz	**6**	0	2
(Spain) G León García (Spain) C Torrens Valero	**6**	3	4
2	(Romania) **C Cristea** (Czech Republic) **E Melicharová**	3	**6**	**6**

Quarterfinals
(South Africa) **L Horn** (Austria) **K Kschwendt**	4	**6**	**6**
(Spain) M Escobar (Spain) C Martínez Granados	**6**	4	3
3	(Germany) **M Babel** (Germany) **W Probst**	**6**	**6**
(Sweden) Å Carlsson (Netherlands) S Noorlander	4	3
(Czech Republic) E Martincová (Czech Republic) H Vildová	1	2
4	(Slovakia) **K Habšudová** (Ukraine) **O Lugina**	**6**	**6**
(Bulgaria) **S Krivencheva** (Czech Republic) **P Langrová**	**6**	**6**
2	(Romania) C Cristea (Czech Republic) E Melicharová	2	4

Semifinals
(South Africa) **L Horn** (Austria) **K Kschwendt**	**6**	4	**6**
3	(Germany) M Babel (Germany) W Probst	3	**6**	3
4	(Slovakia) **K Habšudová** (Ukraine) **O Lugina**	4	**6**	**6**
(Bulgaria) S Krivencheva (Czech Republic) P Langrová	**6**	4	1

Final
(South Africa) Liezel Horn (Austria) Karin Kschwendt	6	5
4	(Slovakia) **Karina Habšudová** (Ukraine) **Olga Lugina**	**7**	**7**
