= 1999 Warsaw Cup by Heros – Doubles =

Doubles
- 1999 Warsaw Cup by Heros

Final
- Champion: (Romania) Cătălina Cristea (Kazakhstan) Irina Selyutina
- Runner-up: (France) Amélie Cocheteux (Slovakia) Janette Husárová
- Score: 6–1, 6–2

Details
- Draw: 16
- Seeds: 4

Events
Singles	Doubles
← 1998 ·	Warsaw Open	· 2000 →

The 1999 Warsaw Cup by Heros doubles was the doubles event of the fifth edition of the Warsaw Open; a WTA Tier IV tournament held in Warsaw, Poland. Olga Lugina and Karina Habšudová were the champions last year when it was a Tier III event. Habšudová did not compete this year, while Lugina teamed up with Sandra Načuk. She was defeated in the quarterfinals.

First seeds Cătălina Cristea and Irina Selyutina won the tournament, defeating Amélie Cocheteux and Janette Husárová in the final.

== Seeds ==
1. (Romania) Cătălina Cristea / (Kazakhstan) Irina Selyutina (champions)
2. (Sweden) Åsa Carlsson / (France) Émilie Loit (quarterfinals, withdrew)
3. (Poland) Aleksandra Olsza / (Bulgaria) Pavlina Stoyanova (semifinals)
4. (Ukraine) Olga Lugina / (Federal Republic of Yugoslavia) Sandra Načuk (quarterfinals)

== Draw ==
=== Key ===
- Q = Qualifier
- WC = Wild card
- LL = Lucky loser
- Alt = Alternate
- SE = Special exempt
- PR = Protected ranking
- ITF = ITF entry
- JE = Junior exempt
- w/o = Walkover
- r = Retired
- d = Defaulted
- SR = Special ranking

First round
1	(Romania) C Cristea (Kazakhstan) I Selyutina	3	6	6
(Spain) RM Andrés Rodríguez (Argentina) MJ Gaidano	6	1	3
(Australia) L Pleming (France) C Tanvier	6	7^{7}
(United States) J Chi (Chinese Taipei) J Lee	2	6^{4}
4	(Ukraine) O Lugina (Federal Republic of Yugoslavia) S Načuk	6	6
(Australia) A Grahame (Hungary) Z Gubacsi	3	1
(Czech Republic) E Martincová (Germany) E Wagner	6	6
(Australia) J Dokić (Switzerland) E Gagliardi	1	3
(United Kingdom) H Crook (United Kingdom) V Davies	6	6
(Russia) M Goloviznina (Czech Republic) Z Hejdová	2	1
Q	(Slovenia) T Pisnik (Croatia) S Talaja	3	2
3	(Poland) A Olsza (Bulgaria) P Stoyanova	6	6
(France) A Cocheteux (Slovakia) J Husárová	4	7^{7}	6
(Poland) K Teodorowicz (Poland) A Żarska	6	6^{0}	1
(Czech Republic) O Blahotová (Czech Republic) G Navrátilová	4	2
2	(Sweden) Å Carlsson (France) É Loit	6	6

Quarterfinals
1	(Romania) C Cristea (Kazakhstan) I Selyutina	6	5	6
(Australia) L Pleming (France) C Tanvier	4	7	2
4	(Ukraine) O Lugina (Federal Republic of Yugoslavia) S Načuk	6	4	4
(Czech Republic) E Martincová (Germany) E Wagner	2	6	6
(United Kingdom) H Crook (United Kingdom) V Davies	3	6	0
3	(Poland) A Olsza (Bulgaria) P Stoyanova	6	3	6
(France) A Cocheteux (Slovakia) J Husárová	w/o
2	(Sweden) Å Carlsson (France) É Loit

Semifinals
1	(Romania) C Cristea (Kazakhstan) I Selyutina	6	4	7^{7}
(Czech Republic) E Martincová (Germany) E Wagner	3	6	6^{4}
3	(Poland) A Olsza (Bulgaria) P Stoyanova	3	3
(France) A Cocheteux (Slovakia) J Husárová	6	6

Final
1	(Romania) C Cristea (Kazakhstan) I Selyutina	6	6
(France) A Cocheteux (Slovakia) J Husárová	1	2

== Qualifying ==
=== Seeds ===
1. (Slovenia) Tina Pisnik / (Croatia) Silvija Talaja (Qualifiers)
2. (Croatia) Lana Miholček / (Sweden) Aleksandra Srndovic (qualifying competition)

=== Qualifiers ===
1. (Slovenia) Tina Pisnik / (Croatia) Silvija Talaja

== Qualifying draw ==
=== Key ===
- Q = Qualifier
- WC = Wild card
- LL = Lucky loser
- Alt = Alternate
- SE = Special exempt
- PR = Protected ranking
- ITF = ITF entry
- JE = Junior exempt
- w/o = Walkover
- r = Retired
- d = Defaulted
- SR = Special ranking

First round
1	(Slovenia) Tina Pisnik (Croatia) Silvija Talaja	8
WC	(Poland) Agata Cioroch (Poland) Paulina Janus	0
(Poland) Agnieszka Abram (Poland) Anna Mogilnicka	1
2	(Croatia) Lana Miholček (Sweden) Aleksandra Srndovic	8

Qualifying competition
1	(Slovenia) Tina Pisnik (Croatia) Silvija Talaja	8
2	(Croatia) Lana Miholček (Sweden) Aleksandra Srndovic	0
