= 2000 Warsaw Cup by Heros – Doubles =

Doubles
- 2000 Warsaw Cup by Heros

Final
- Champions: (Italy) Tathiana Garbin (Slovakia) Janette Husárová
- Runners-up: (Uzbekistan) Iroda Tulyaganova (Ukraine) Anna Zaporozhanova
- Score: 6–3, 6–1

Details
- Draw: 16
- Seeds: 4

Events
| Singles | Doubles |
| ← 1999 · | Warsaw Open | · 2002 → |

Cătălina Cristea and Irina Selyutina were the defending champions, but both players decided to compete in Berlin at the same week, with different partners.

Tathiana Garbin and Janette Husárová won the title by defeating Iroda Tulyaganova and Anna Zaporozhanova 6–3, 6–1 in the final.

== Seeds ==
1. (Russia) Elena Likhovtseva / (Ukraine) Elena Tatarkova (semifinals)
2. (Netherlands) Kristie Boogert / (Netherlands) Miriam Oremans (quarterfinals)
3. (Italy) Tathiana Garbin / (Slovakia) Janette Husárová (champions)
4. (Australia) Annabel Ellwood / (Australia) Bryanne Stewart (first round)

== Draw ==
=== Key ===
- Q = Qualifier
- WC = Wild card
- LL = Lucky loser
- Alt = Alternate
- SE = Special exempt
- PR = Protected ranking
- ITF = ITF entry
- JE = Junior exempt
- w/o = Walkover
- r = Retired
- d = Defaulted
- SR = Special ranking

=== Draw ===
First round
1 | (Russia) E Likhovtseva (Ukraine) E Tatarkova | 6 | 3 | 7^{7}
(Croatia) J Kostanić (Czech Republic) M Paštiková | 2 | 6 | 6^{5}
(Russia) E Kulikovskaya (Federal Republic of Yugoslavia) S Načuk | 7^{7} | 6
(Czech Republic) E Martincová (Spain) M Sánchez Lorenzo | 6^{4} | 4
3 | (Italy) T Garbin (Slovakia) J Husárová | 6 | 6
(South Africa) K Grant (United States) R Jensen | 2 | 3
(Italy) A Canepa (Germany) K Freye | 4 | 2
Q | (Italy) F Pennetta (Italy) An Serra Zanetti | 6 | 6
WC | (Argentina) M Díaz Oliva (Poland) A Żarska | 6 | 3 | 1
(Germany) M Babel (Germany) J Kandarr | 1 | 6 | 6
(Poland) M Grzybowska (Slovakia) H Nagyová | 5 | 6 | 7^{7}
4 | (Australia) A Ellwood (Australia) B Stewart | 7 | 0 | 6^{3}
(Czech Republic) M Maštalířová (Czech Republic) G Navrátilová | 6 | 4 | 6^{3}
(Uzbekistan) I Tulyaganova (Ukraine) A Zaporozhanova | 4 | 6 | 7^{7}
(Bulgaria) L Bacheva (Spain) C Torrens Valero | 6 | 3 | 3
2 | (Netherlands) K Boogert (Netherlands) M Oremans | 3 | 6 | 6

Quarterfinals
1 | (Russia) E Likhovtseva (Ukraine) E Tatarkova | 4 | 6 | 6
(Russia) E Kulikovskaya (Federal Republic of Yugoslavia) S Načuk | 6 | 2 | 4
3 | (Italy) T Garbin (Slovakia) J Husárová | w/o
Q | (Italy) F Pennetta (Italy) An Serra Zanetti
(Germany) M Babel (Germany) J Kandarr | 3 | 6^{3}
(Poland) M Grzybowska (Slovakia) H Nagyová | 6 | 7^{7}
(Uzbekistan) I Tulyaganova (Ukraine) A Zaporozhanova | 6 | 2 | 6
2 | (Netherlands) K Boogert (Netherlands) M Oremans | 4 | 6 | 3

Semifinals
1 | (Russia) E Likhovtseva (Ukraine) E Tatarkova | 5 | 2
3 | (Italy) T Garbin (Slovakia) J Husárová | 7 | 6
(Poland) M Grzybowska (Slovakia) H Nagyová | 6 | 1 | 3
(Uzbekistan) I Tulyaganova (Ukraine) A Zaporozhanova | 3 | 6 | 6

Final
3 | (Italy) T Garbin (Slovakia) J Husárová | 6 | 6
(Uzbekistan) I Tulyaganova (Ukraine) A Zaporozhanova | 3 | 1

== Qualifying ==
=== Qualifying seeds ===
The top seed received a bye to the final round.

1. (Italy) Flavia Pennetta / (Italy) Antonella Serra Zanetti (qualified)
2. (France) Stéphanie Foretz / (Austria) Melanie Schnell (qualifying competition)

=== Qualifiers ===
1. (Italy) Flavia Pennetta / (Italy) Antonella Serra Zanetti

=== Qualifying draw ===
| First round | | | Qualifying competition |
| | | | 1 | (Italy) Flavia Pennetta (Italy) Antonella Serra Zanetti | 8 |
| | (United States) Kristina Brandi (United States) Jennifer Hopkins | 2 | 2 | (France) Stéphanie Foretz (Austria) Melanie Schnell | 4 |
| 2 | (France) Stéphanie Foretz (Austria) Melanie Schnell | 8 |
