= 1997 Warsaw Cup by Heros – Singles =

Singles
- 1997 Warsaw Cup by Heros
- 1996 Champion: (Slovakia) Henrieta Nagyová

Final
- Champion: (Austria) Barbara Paulus
- Runner-up: (Slovakia) Henrieta Nagyová
- Score: 6–4, 6–4

Details
- Draw: 30
- Seeds: 8

Events
Singles	Doubles
← 1996 ·	Warsaw Cup by Heros	· 1998 →

Henrieta Nagyová was the defending champion but lost in the final 6–4, 6–4 against Barbara Paulus.

== Seeds ==
A champion seed is indicated in bold text while text in italics indicates the round in which that seed was eliminated. The top two seeds received a bye to the second round.

1. (Austria) **Barbara Paulus (champion)**
2. (Romania) Ruxandra Dragomir (semifinals)
3. (Slovakia) Karina Habšudová (first round)
4. (Switzerland) Patty Schnyder (second round)
5. (Austria) Barbara Schett (first round)
6. (Slovakia) Henrieta Nagyová (final)
7. (Czech Republic) Denisa Chládková (second round)
8. (Slovakia) Katarína Studeníková (quarterfinals)

== Draw ==
=== Key ===
- Q = Qualifier
- WC = Wild card
- LL = Lucky loser
- Alt = Alternate
- ITF = ITF entry
- PR = Protected ranking
- SR = Special ranking
- SE = Special exempt
- JE = Junior exempt
- JR = Junior Accelerator Programme entrant
- CO = College Accelerator Programme entrant
- NG = Next Gen Accelerator Program entrant
- w/o = Walkover
- r = Retired
- d = Defaulted

=== Final ===
Final
1	(Austria) **Barbara Paulus**	**6**	**6**
6	(Slovakia) Henrieta Nagyová	4	4

=== Section 1 ===
First round
(Belgium) S Devillé	**6**	3	2/r
(Germany) **M Babel**	4	**6**	**5**
Q	(Spain) **G León García**	**6**	**6**
WC	(Poland) A Olsza	2	1
(Germany) J Kandarr	6	6
7	(Czech Republic) **D Chládková**	**7**	**7**
3	(Slovakia) K Habšudová	3	**6**	4
(South Africa) **J Kruger**	**6**	2	**6**
(Netherlands) **K Boogert**	**6**	5	**7**
(Italy) F Perfetti	4	**7**	6
Q	(Czech Republic) **L Němečková**	**6**	5	**6**
(Belgium) L Courtois	4	**7**	4
(Spain) **V Ruano-Pascual**	**6**	5	**7**
5	(Austria) B Schett	1	**7**	5

Second round
1	(Austria) **B Paulus**	**6**	**6**
(Germany) M Babel	0	0
(Spain) **G León García**	**6**	**6**
7	(Czech Republic) D Chládková	4	3
(South Africa) **J Kruger**	**6**	**6**
(Netherlands) K Boogert	4	2
Q	(Czech Republic) L Němečková	4	**6**	1
(Spain) **V Ruano-Pascual**	**6**	4	**6**

Quarterfinals
1	(Austria) **B Paulus**	**6**	**6**
(Spain) G León García	2	0
(South Africa) J Kruger	5	5
(Spain) **V Ruano-Pascual**	**7**	**7**

Semifinals
1	(Austria) **B Paulus**	**6**	**6**
(Spain) V Ruano Pascual	2	1

=== Section 2 ===
First round
6	(Slovakia) **H Nagyová**	**6**	**6**
(Czech Republic) S Kleinová	4	4
Q	(Ukraine) **O Lugina**	**6**	**6**
(Austria) M Maruska	3	2
(Spain) **C Torrens Valero**	**6**	**6**
Q	(Ukraine) E Tatarkova	4	4
(Argentina) I Gorrochategui	3	2
4	(Switzerland) **P Schnyder**	**6**	**6**
8	(Slovakia) **K Studeníková**	**6**	**6**
WC	(Poland) M Grzybowska	3	2
(Italy) **S Cecchini**	**6**	**6**
(Czech Republic) P Langrová	3	2
(Spain) **M Sánchez Lorenzo**	2	**6**	**6**
(France) A Dechaume-Balleret	**6**	4	2

Second round
6	(Slovakia) **H Nagyová**	**6**	**6**
Q	(Ukraine) O Lugina	2	1
(Spain) **C Torrens Valero**	2	**6**	**6**
4	(Switzerland) P Schnyder	**6**	2	2
8	(Slovakia) **K Studeníková**	1	**6**	**6**
(Italy) S Cecchini	**6**	3	3
(Spain) M Sánchez Lorenzo	3	**6**	1
2	(Romania) **R Dragomir**	**6**	2	**6**

Quarterfinals
6	(Slovakia) **H Nagyová**	**6**	**6**
(Spain) C Torrens Valero	3	1
8	(Slovakia) K Studeníková	2	3
2	(Romania) **R Dragomir**	**6**	**6**

Semifinals
6	(Slovakia) **H Nagyová**	**6**	**7**
2	(Romania) R Dragomir	4	5
