= 1998 Warsaw Cup by Heros – Singles =

Singles
- 1998 Warsaw Cup by Heros
- 1997 Champion: (Austria) Barbara Paulus

Final
- Champion: (Spain) Conchita Martínez
- Runner-up: (Italy) Silvia Farina
- Score: 6–0, 6–3

Details
- Draw: 30
- Seeds: 8

Events
Singles	Doubles
← 1997 ·	Warsaw Cup by Heros	· 1999 →

Barbara Paulus was the defending champion, of this tennis competition, but lost in the second round to Andrea Glass.

Conchita Martínez won in the final 6–0, 6–3 against Silvia Farina.

== Seeds ==
A champion seed is indicated in bold text while text in italics indicates the round in which that seed was eliminated. The top two seeds received a bye to the second round.

1. (Spain) **Conchita Martínez (champion)**
2. (South Africa) Joannette Kruger (quarterfinals)
3. (Slovakia) Henrieta Nagyová (semifinals)
4. (Italy) Silvia Farina (final)
5. (Belgium) Sabine Appelmans (first round)
6. (Austria) Barbara Paulus (second round)
7. (Poland) Magdalena Grzybowska (semifinals)
8. (Spain) Virginia Ruano Pascual (first round)

== Draw ==
=== Key ===
- Q = Qualifier
- WC = Wild card
- LL = Lucky loser
- Alt = Alternate
- SE = Special exempt
- PR = Protected ranking
- ITF = ITF entry
- JE = Junior exempt
- w/o = Walkover
- r = Retired
- d = Defaulted
- SR = Special ranking

=== Final ===
Final
WC/1	(Spain) **Conchita Martínez**	**6**	**6**
4	(Italy) Silvia Farina	0	3

=== Section 1 ===
First round
(Czech Republic) **K Hrdličková**	**6**	**6**
(Germany) M Babel	0	3
(Spain) G León García	6	1
Q	(Croatia) **S Talaja**	**7**	**6**
(Slovakia) **K Habšudová**	0	**6**	**6**
8	(Spain) V Ruano Pascual	**6**	3	2
3	(Slovakia) **H Nagyová**	**6**	**6**
(Spain) C Torrens Valero	3	0
(Spain) M Sánchez Lorenzo	2	2
Q	(Czech Republic) **E Martincová**	**6**	**6**
(Israel) **A Smashnova**	**7**	**7**
WC	(Poland) A Olsza	6	6
(Romania) **C Cristea**	4	**6**	**6**
5	(Belgium) S Appelmans	**6**	2	3

Second round
WC/1	(Spain) **C Martínez**	**6**	4	**7**
(Czech Republic) K Hrdličková	1	**6**	5
Q	(Croatia) S Talaja	3	**7**	5
(Slovakia) **K Habšudová**	**6**	5	**7**
3	(Slovakia) **H Nagyová**	**6**	**6**
Q	(Czech Republic) E Martincová	3	1
(Israel) A Smashnova	**6**	2	2
(Romania) **C Cristea**	3	**6**	**6**

Quarterfinals
WC/1	(Spain) **C Martínez**	**6**	**6**
(Slovakia) K Habšudová	2	4
3	(Slovakia) **H Nagyová**	**6**	**6**
(Romania) C Cristea	0	1

Semifinals
WC/1	(Spain) **C Martínez**	**6**	4	**6**
3	(Slovakia) H Nagyová	2	**6**	2

=== Section 2 ===
First round
6	(Austria) **B Paulus**	1	**7**	**7**
(Russia) E Makarova	**6**	5	5
(Germany) **A Glass**	2	**7**	**6**
(Belarus) O Barabanschikova	**6**	5	3
(Czech Republic) D Chládková	4	2
(Ukraine) **O Lugina**	**6**	**6**
(Sweden) Å Carlsson	4	3
4	(Italy) **S Farina**	**6**	**6**
7	(Poland) **M Grzybowska**	**6**	**6**
(Netherlands) S Noorlander	3	2
Q	(Slovakia) **Ľ Cervanová**	**6**	**6**
Q	(Romania) R Sandu	0	3
(Czech Republic) S Kleinová	3	**6**	4
WC	(Russia) **N Petrova**	**6**	1	**6**

Second round
6	(Austria) B Paulus	4	2
(Germany) **A Glass**	**6**	**6**
(Ukraine) O Lugina	1	6
4	(Italy) **S Farina**	**6**	**7**
7	(Poland) **M Grzybowska**	**6**	**6**
Q	(Slovakia) Ľ Cervanová	2	0
WC	(Russia) N Petrova	3	5
2	(South Africa) **J Kruger**	**6**	**7**

Quarterfinals
(Germany) A Glass	3	2
4	(Italy) **S Farina**	**6**	**6**
7	(Poland) **M Grzybowska**	**6**	**6**
2	(South Africa) J Kruger	3	2

Semifinals
4	(Italy) **S Farina**	4	**6**	**4**
7	(Poland) M Grzybowska	**6**	4	2/r
