= 1998 Warsaw Cup by Heros =

- Date: 13–19 July
- Edition: 4th
- Category: Tier III
- Draw: 30S / 16D
- Surface: Clay / outdoor
- Location: Warsaw, Poland
- Venue: Warszawianka Courts

Champions

Singles
- (Spain) Conchita Martínez

Doubles
- (Slovakia) Karina Habšudová / (Ukraine) Olga Lugina
← 1997 ·	Warsaw Cup by Heros	· 1999 →

The 1998 Warsaw Cup by Heros was a women's tennis tournament played on outdoor clay courts at the Warszawianka Courts in Warsaw, Poland that was part of Tier III of the 1998 WTA Tour. The tournament was held from 13 July until 19 July 1998. First-seeded Conchita Martínez won the singles title and earned $27,000 first-prize money.

== Finals ==
=== Singles ===
(Spain) Conchita Martínez defeated (Italy) Silvia Farina 6–0, 6–3

- It was Martínez's 3rd title of the year and the 36th of her career.

=== Doubles ===
(Slovakia) Karina Habšudová / (Ukraine) Olga Lugina defeated (South Africa) Liezel Horn / (Austria) Karin Kschwendt 7–6^{(7–2)}, 7–5

- It was Habšudová's 2nd title of the year and the 4th of her career. It was Lugina's only title of the year and the 2nd of her career.
