= 1997 Warsaw Cup by Heros =

- Date: 21–27 July
- Edition: 3rd
- Category: Tier III
- Draw: 30S / 16D
- Prize money: $164,250
- Surface: Clay
- Location: Warsaw, Poland
- Venue: Warszawianka Courts

Champions

Singles
- (Austria) Barbara Paulus

Doubles
- (Romania) Ruxandra Dragomir / (Argentina) Inés Gorrochategui
← 1996 ·	Warsaw Cup by Heros	· 1998 →

The 1997 Warsaw Cup by Heros was a women's tennis tournament played on outdoor clay courts at the Warszawianka Courts in Warsaw, Poland that was part of the Tier III category of the 1997 WTA Tour. It was the third edition of the tournament and was held from 21 July until 27 July 1997. Top-seeded Barbara Paulus won the singles title.

== Finals ==
=== Singles ===
(Austria) Barbara Paulus defeated (Slovakia) Henrieta Nagyová 6–4, 6–4

- It was Paulus' only singles title of the year and the 6th and last of her career.

=== Doubles ===
(Romania) Ruxandra Dragomir / (Argentina) Inés Gorrochategui defeated (Germany) Meike Babel / (Australia) Catherine Barclay 6–4, 6–0

- It was Dragomir's third title of the year and the eighth of her career. It was Gorrochategui's only title of the year and the seventh of her career.
