= 1997 Warsaw Cup by Heros – Doubles =

Doubles
- 1997 Warsaw Cup by Heros
- 1996 Champions: (Ukraine) Olga Lugina (Bulgaria) Elena Pampoulova

Final
- Champions: (Romania) Ruxandra Dragomir (Argentina) Inés Gorrochategui
- Runners-up: (Germany) Meike Babel (Australia) Catherine Barclay
- Score: 6–4, 6–0

Details
- Draw: 16
- Seeds: 4

Events
Singles	Doubles
← 1996 ·	Warsaw Open	· 1998 →

Olga Lugina and Elena Pampoulova were the defending champions but only Lugina competed that year with Nino Louarsabishvili.

Louarsabishvili and Lugina lost in the first round to Ruxandra Dragomir and Inés Gorrochategui.

Dragomir and Gorrochategui won in the final 6–4, 6–0 against Meike Babel and Catherine Barclay.

== Seeds ==
Champion seeds are indicated in bold text while text in italics indicates the round in which those seeds were eliminated.

1. (Netherlands) Kristie Boogert / (Slovakia) Karina Habšudová (semifinals)
2. (Romania) **Ruxandra Dragomir** / (Argentina) **Inés Gorrochategui (champions)**
3. (Czech Republic) Eva Melicharová / (Czech Republic) Helena Vildová (quarterfinals)
4. (Slovakia) Henrieta Nagyová / (Switzerland) Patty Schnyder (semifinals)

== Draw ==
=== Key ===
- Q = Qualifier
- WC = Wild card
- LL = Lucky loser
- Alt = Alternate
- ITF = ITF entry
- PR = Protected ranking
- SR = Special ranking
- SE = Special exempt
- JE = Junior exempt
- JR = Junior Accelerator Programme entrant
- CO = College Accelerator Programme entrant
- NG = Next Gen Accelerator Program entrant
- w/o = Walkover
- r = Retired
- d = Defaulted

First round
1	(Netherlands) **K Boogert** (Slovakia) **K Habšudová**	**6**	**6**
(Argentina) B Fulco-Villella (Portugal) S Prazeres	2	1
(Belgium) S Devillé (Hungary) K Marosi	**7**	1	1
(Poland) **A Olsza** (Slovakia) **K Studeníková**	6	**6**	**6**
3	(Czech Republic) **E Melicharová** (Czech Republic) **H Vildová**	**7**	4	**7**
(Czech Republic) P Langrová (Czech Republic) L Němečková	6	**6**	5
(Belgium) L Courtois (Spain) V Ruano-Pascual	5	**6**	3
(Germany) **M Babel** (Australia) **C Barclay**	**7**	3	**6**
(Italy) S Cecchini (Italy) A Serra Zanetti	2	4
(Poland) **M Grzybowska** (Ukraine) **E Tatarkova**	**6**	**6**
WC	(Poland) M Feistel (Poland) K Teodorowicz	3	3
4	(Slovakia) **H Nagyová** (Switzerland) **P Schnyder**	**6**	**6**
(Austria) **E Habeler** (United States) **R Jensen**	2	**7**	**6**
(Spain) M Sánchez Lorenzo (Spain) C Torrens Valero	**6**	5	4
(Georgia (country)) N Louarsabishvili (Ukraine) O Lugina	**6**	0	1
2	(Romania) **R Dragomir** (Argentina) **I Gorrochategui**	2	**6**	**6**

Quarterfinals
1	(Netherlands) **K Boogert** (Slovakia) **K Habšudová**	**7**	**6**
(Poland) A Olsza (Slovakia) K Studeníková	5	1
3	(Czech Republic) E Melicharová (Czech Republic) H Vildová	5	1
(Germany) **M Babel** (Australia) **C Barclay**	**7**	**6**
(Poland) M Grzybowska (Ukraine) E Tatarkova	**6**	1	3
4	(Slovakia) **H Nagyová** (Switzerland) **P Schnyder**	3	**6**	**6**
(Austria) E Habeler (United States) R Jensen	0	1
2	(Romania) **R Dragomir** (Argentina) **I Gorrochategui**	**6**	**6**

Semifinals
1	(Netherlands) K Boogert (Slovakia) K Habšudová
(Germany) **M Babel** (Australia) **C Barclay**	**w/o**
4	(Slovakia) H Nagyová (Switzerland) P Schnyder	1	4
2	(Romania) **R Dragomir** (Argentina) **I Gorrochategui**	**6**	**6**

Final
(Germany) Meike Babel (Australia) Catherine Barclay	4	0
2	(Romania) **Ruxandra Dragomir** (Argentina) **Inés Gorrochategui**	**6**	**6**
