= 2009 Warsaw Open – Doubles =

Doubles
- 2009 Warsaw Open

Final
- Champions: (United States) Raquel Kops-Jones (United States) Bethanie Mattek-Sands
- Runners-up: (China) Yan Zi (China) Zheng Jie
- Score: 6–1, 6–1

Details
- Draw: 16
- Seeds: 4

Events
Singles	Doubles
- Warsaw Open

== Seeds ==
1. (Czech Republic) Květa Peschke / (United States) Lisa Raymond (semifinals, retired)
2. (China) Yan Zi / (China) Zheng Jie (final)
3. (United States) Raquel Kops-Jones / (United States) Bethanie Mattek-Sands (champions)
4. (Ukraine) Alona Bondarenko / (Ukraine) Kateryna Bondarenko (semifinals)

== Draw ==
Key

- Q = Qualifier
- WC = Wild card
- LL = Lucky loser
- Alt = Alternate
- ITF = ITF entry
- PR = Protected ranking
- SR = Special ranking
- SE = Special exempt
- JE = Junior exempt
- JR = Junior Accelerator Programme entrant
- CO = College Accelerator Programme entrant
- NG = Next Gen Accelerator Program entrant
- w/o = Walkover
- r = Retired
- d = Defaulted

=== Brackets ===
First round
1	(Czech Republic) K Peschke (United States) L Raymond	7	5	[10]
(Italy) S Errani (Italy) T Garbin	5	7	[8]
(Latvia) L Dekmeijere (Turkey) İ Şenoğlu	5	4
(Germany) J Görges (Romania) IR Olaru	7	6
3	(United States) R Kops-Jones (United States) B Mattek-Sands	7	6
(France) S Lefèvre (Romania) A Szatmári	6^{7}	4
(Poland) K Jans (Poland) Ali Rosolska	4	3
(Ukraine) M Koryttseva (Kazakhstan) G Voskoboeva	6	6
(Czech Republic) N Fraňková (Germany) V Henke	5	7	[4]
(Hungary) M Czink (South Africa) N Grandin	7	5	[10]
WC	(Poland) K Kosińska (Poland) Ale Rosolska	3	0
4	(Ukraine) A Bondarenko (Ukraine) K Bondarenko	6	6
(Ukraine) V Kapshay (Slovakia) L Tvarošková	1	1
(Uzbekistan) A Amanmuradova (Belarus) D Kustova	6	6
(Romania) E Gallovits (Belarus) O Govortsova	1	2
2	(China) Z Yan (China) J Zheng	6	6

Quarterfinals
1	(Czech Republic) K Peschke (United States) L Raymond	6	1	[10]
(Germany) J Görges (Romania) IR Olaru	3	6	[8]
3	(United States) R Kops-Jones (United States) B Mattek-Sands	6	6
(Ukraine) M Koryttseva (Kazakhstan) G Voskoboeva	1	3
(Hungary) M Czink (South Africa) N Grandin	3	6	[3]
4	(Ukraine) A Bondarenko (Ukraine) K Bondarenko	6	4	[10]
(Uzbekistan) A Amanmuradova (Belarus) D Kustova	3	2
2	(China) Z Yan (China) J Zheng	6	6

Semifinals
1	(Czech Republic) K Peschke (United States) L Raymond	5	r
3	(United States) R Kops-Jones (United States) B Mattek-Sands	6
4	(Ukraine) A Bondarenko (Ukraine) K Bondarenko	6^{4}	3
2	(China) Z Yan (China) J Zheng	7	6

Final
3	(United States) R Kops-Jones (United States) B Mattek-Sands	6	6
2	(China) Z Yan (China) J Zheng	1	1
