= 2000 Warsaw Cup by Heros – Singles =

Singles
- 2000 Warsaw Cup by Heros
- 1999 Champion: (Spain) Cristina Torrens Valero

Final
- Champion: (Slovakia) Henrieta Nagyová
- Runner-up: (Netherlands) Amanda Hopmans
- Score: 2–6, 6–4, 7–5

Details
- Draw: 32 (2WC/4Q/1LL)
- Seeds: 8

Events
Singles	Doubles
← 1999 ·	Warsaw Open	· 2002 →

Cristina Torrens Valero was the defending champion, but lost in quarterfinals to Jennifer Hopkins.

Henrieta Nagyová won the title by defeating Amanda Hopmans 2–6, 6–4, 7–5 in the final.

== Seeds ==
1. (Russia) Elena Likhovtseva (first round)
2. (United States) Kristina Brandi (first round)
3. (Italy) Tathiana Garbin (quarterfinals)
4. (Russia) Nadia Petrova (first round)
5. (Netherlands) Kristie Boogert (second round)
6. (Czech Republic) Adriana Gerši (second round)
7. (Austria) Patricia Wartusch (second round)
8. (Belarus) Olga Barabanschikova (quarterfinals)

== Draw ==
=== Key ===
- Q = Qualifier
- WC = Wild card
- LL = Lucky loser
- Alt = Alternate
- SE = Special exempt
- PR = Protected ranking
- ITF = ITF entry
- JE = Junior exempt
- w/o = Walkover
- r = Retired
- d = Defaulted
- SR = Special ranking

=== Finals ===
Semifinals
(United States) Jennifer Hopkins	0	4
(Slovakia) Henrieta Nagyová	6	6
(Netherlands) Amanda Hopmans	2	7	6
(Netherlands) Miriam Oremans	6	5	0

Final
(Slovakia) Henrieta Nagyová	2	6	7
(Netherlands) Amanda Hopmans	6	4	5

=== Top half ===
First round
1	(Russia) E Likhovtseva	6	3	4
(Spain) C Torrens Valero	4	6	6
Q	(Austria) M Schnell	6	6
(Argentina) M Díaz Oliva	2	1
(United States) J Hopkins	7	6
LL	(Bulgaria) D Topalova	5	2
(Switzerland) M Vavrinec	7^{7}	2	2
7	(Austria) P Wartusch	6^{5}	6	6
3	(Italy) T Garbin	4	6	6
(Australia) A Ellwood	6	4	1
Q	(Czech Republic) L Průšová	7	6
(Spain) M Sánchez Lorenzo	5	4
(Slovakia) H Nagyová	7	6
(Federal Republic of Yugoslavia) S Načuk	5	2
WC	(Poland) M Grzybowska	1	2
5	(Netherlands) K Boogert	6	6

Second round
(Spain) C Torrens Valero	6	7^{8}
Q	(Austria) M Schnell	1	6^{6}
(United States) J Hopkins	6	2	6
7	(Austria) P Wartusch	4	6	4
3	(Italy) T Garbin	7	2	6
Q	(Czech Republic) L Průšová	5	6	3
(Slovakia) H Nagyová	6	6
5	(Netherlands) K Boogert	0	3

Quarterfinals
(Spain) C Torrens Valero	0	7^{7}	2
(United States) J Hopkins	6	6^{4}	6
3	(Italy) T Garbin	3	6^{2}
(Slovakia) H Nagyová	6	7^{7}

Semifinals
(United States) J Hopkins	0	4
(Slovakia) H Nagyová	6	6

=== Bottom half ===
First round
8	(Belarus) O Barabanschikova	7^{7}	7^{7}
(Venezuela) M Vento	6^{4}	6^{2}
Q	(France) É Loit	4	6	1
Q	(Slovakia) J Husárová	6	2	6
(Croatia) J Kostanić	6	6
WC	(Poland) A Żarska	4	3
(Netherlands) A Hopmans	7	6
4	(Russia) N Petrova	5	3
6	(Czech Republic) A Gerši	6	6
(Belgium) L Courtois	3	4
(Germany) J Kandarr	6	6
(Germany) M Babel	2	4
(Hungary) P Mandula	6	6
(Bulgaria) L Bacheva	4	3
(Netherlands) M Oremans	2	6	7^{7}
2	(United States) K Brandi	6	2	6^{3}

Second round
8	(Belarus) O Barabanschikova	6	6
Q	(Slovakia) J Husárová	4	1
(Croatia) J Kostanić	2	3
(Netherlands) A Hopmans	6	6
6	(Czech Republic) A Gerši	4	1
(Germany) J Kandarr	6	6
(Hungary) P Mandula	3	1
(Netherlands) M Oremans	6	6

Quarterfinals
8	(Belarus) O Barabanschikova	3	3
(Netherlands) A Hopmans	6	6
(Germany) J Kandarr	5	6	3
(Netherlands) M Oremans	7	1	6

Semifinals
(Netherlands) A Hopmans	2	7	6
(Netherlands) M Oremans	6	5	0

== Qualifying ==
=== Qualifying seeds ===
1. (Italy) Francesca Schiavone (first round)
2. (Hungary) Anna Földényi (first round)
3. (Ukraine) Elena Tatarkova (first round)
4. (Uzbekistan) Iroda Tulyaganova (second round)
5. (Bulgaria) Desislava Topalova (qualifying competition, lucky loser)
6. (Italy) Alice Canepa (first round)
7. (France) Stéphanie Foretz (first round)
8. (Australia) Bryanne Stewart (second round)

=== Qualifiers ===
1. (France) Émilie Loit
2. (Slovakia) Janette Husárová
3. (Czech Republic) Libuše Průšová
4. (Austria) Melanie Schnell

=== Lucky loser ===
1. (Bulgaria) Desislava Topalova

=== Qualifying seeds ===
==== First qualifier ====
First round
1	(Italy) Francesca Schiavone	4	1
(France) Émilie Loit	6	6
WC	(Australia) Monique Adamczak	3	3
(Ukraine) Tatiana Kovalchuk	6	6
(Czech Republic) Eva Martincová	6	6
WC	(Poland) Monika Schneider	0	2
(France) Karolina Jagieniak	3	6	6
7	(France) Stéphanie Foretz	6	1	3

Second round
(France) Émilie Loit	6	7
(Ukraine) Tatiana Kovalchuk	2	5
(Czech Republic) Eva Martincová	1	6	7^{7}
(France) Karolina Jagieniak	6	3	6^{1}

Qualifying competition
(France) Émilie Loit	6	6
(Czech Republic) Eva Martincová	4	4

==== Second qualifier ====
First round
3	(Ukraine) Elena Tatarkova	4	6	5
(Germany) Veronika Martinek	6	0	7
(Austria) Sybille Bammer	3	2
(Slovakia) Janette Husárová	6	6
WC	(Poland) Joanna Sakowicz-Kostecka	2	3
(Czech Republic) Michaela Paštiková	6	6
(Italy) Flavia Pennetta	3	6	6
6	(Italy) Alice Canepa	6	0	0

Second round
(Germany) Veronika Martinek	2	2
(Slovakia) Janette Husárová	6	6
(Czech Republic) Michaela Paštiková	4	4
(Italy) Flavia Pennetta	6	6

Qualifying competition
(Slovakia) Janette Husárová	6	4	6
(Italy) Flavia Pennetta	2	6	3

==== Third qualifier ====
First round
5	(Bulgaria) Desislava Topalova	6	6
(Hungary) Kira Nagy	3	2
(Ukraine) Anna Zaporozhanova	6^{3}	6	6
(Czech Republic) Renata Kučerová	7^{7}	2	1
(Russia) Evgenia Kulikovskaya	2	4
(Czech Republic) Libuše Průšová	6	6
(Czech Republic) Alena Neštická	3	2
4	(Uzbekistan) Iroda Tulyaganova	6	6

Second round
5	(Bulgaria) Desislava Topalova	6	6
(Ukraine) Anna Zaporozhanova	4	3
(Czech Republic) Libuše Průšová	6	4	6
4	(Uzbekistan) Iroda Tulyaganova	4	6	4

Qualifying competition
5	(Bulgaria) Desislava Topalova	4	2
(Czech Republic) Libuše Průšová	6	6

==== Fourth qualifier ====
First round
8	(Australia) Bryanne Stewart	6	5	6
(Poland) Katarzyna Strączy	3	7	3
(Italy) Antonella Serra Zanetti	4	6	7
WC	(Croatia) Lana Miholček	6	4	5
(Austria) Melanie Schnell	6	6
(Italy) Laura Dell'Angelo	3	0
(Italy) Gloria Pizzichini	6	3	6
2	(Hungary) Anna Földényi	4	6	4

Second round
8	(Australia) Bryanne Stewart	6	5	2
(Italy) Antonella Serra Zanetti	1	7	6
(Austria) Melanie Schnell	6	6^{3}	6
(Italy) Gloria Pizzichini	4	7^{7}	3

Qualifying competition
(Italy) Antonella Serra Zanetti	3	6^{3}
(Austria) Melanie Schnell	6	7^{7}
