= 2009 Warsaw Open – Singles =

Singles
- 2009 Warsaw Open

Final
- Champion: (Romania) Alexandra Dulgheru
- Runner-up: (Ukraine) Alona Bondarenko
- Score: 7–6^{(7–3)}, 3–6, 6–0

Details
- Draw: 32
- Seeds: 8

Events
Singles	Doubles
- Warsaw Open

Unseeded Alexandra Dulgheru defeated Alona Bondarenko in the final, 7–6^{(7–3)}, 3–6, 6–0 to win the singles tennis title at the 2009 Warsaw Open.

== Seeds ==
1. (Denmark) Caroline Wozniacki (withdrew due to back injury)
2. (Poland) Agnieszka Radwańska (withdrew due to back injury)
3. (China) Zheng Jie (second round)
4. (Canada) Aleksandra Wozniak (first round)
5. (Italy) Sara Errani (second round)
6. (Slovakia) Daniela Hantuchová (semifinals)
7. (United States) Bethanie Mattek-Sands (first round)
8. (Ukraine) Alona Bondarenko (final)
9. (Bulgaria) Tsvetana Pironkova (first round)

== Draw ==
Key

- Q = Qualifier
- WC = Wild card
- LL = Lucky loser
- Alt = Alternate
- ITF = ITF entry
- PR = Protected ranking
- SR = Special ranking
- SE = Special exempt
- JE = Junior exempt
- JR = Junior Accelerator Programme entrant
- CO = College Accelerator Programme entrant
- NG = Next Gen Accelerator Program entrant
- w/o = Walkover
- r = Retired
- d = Defaulted

=== Finals ===
Semifinals
8	(Ukraine) Alona Bondarenko	6	7
(United Kingdom) Anne Keothavong	2	5
Q	(Romania) Alexandra Dulgheru	6	6^{2}	6
6/WC	(Slovakia) Daniela Hantuchová	4	7	1

Final
8	(Ukraine) Alona Bondarenko	6^{3}	6	0
Q	(Romania) Alexandra Dulgheru	7	3	6

=== Top half ===
First round
LL	(Belarus) D Kustova	6	6
LL	(Slovakia) L Tvarošková	4	1
(Italy) T Garbin	1	7	3
WC	(Russia) M Sharapova	6	6^{6}	6
(Poland) M Domachowska	6	6
(Uzbekistan) A Amanmuradova	2	1
WC	(Poland) K Piter	0	0
8	(Ukraine) A Bondarenko	6	6
4	(Canada) A Wozniak	6^{5}	3
(Germany) J Görges	7	6
(Australia) J Dokić	4	3
Q	(Romania) IR Olaru	6	6
(Romania) E Gallovits	6	5	3
(United States) J Craybas	3	7	6
(United Kingdom) A Keothavong	6	7
7	(United States) B Mattek-Sands	2	6^{4}

Second round
LL	(Belarus) D Kustova	2	0
WC	(Russia) M Sharapova	6	6
(Poland) M Domachowska	3	1
8	(Ukraine) A Bondarenko	6	6
(Germany) J Görges	3	6	6^{3}
Q	(Romania) IR Olaru	6	0	7
(United States) J Craybas	6	3	1
(United Kingdom) A Keothavong	3	6	6

Quarterfinals
WC	(Russia) M Sharapova	2	2
8	(Ukraine) A Bondarenko	6	6
Q	(Romania) IR Olaru	0	1
(United Kingdom) A Keothavong	6	6

Semifinals
8	(Ukraine) A Bondarenko	6	7
(United Kingdom) A Keothavong	2	5

=== Bottom half ===
First round
9	(Bulgaria) T Pironkova	5	2
(Ukraine) K Bondarenko	7	6
(Austria) P Mayr	4	1
(Kazakhstan) G Voskoboeva	6	6
Q	(Romania) A Szatmári	3	4
Q	(Romania) A Dulgheru	6	6
Q	(Hungary) G Arn	2	6	6^{2}
5	(Italy) S Errani	6	1	7
6/WC	(Slovakia) D Hantuchová	3	6	6
(Spain) N Llagostera Vives	6	3	3
(Poland) U Radwańska	6	3	6
(Ukraine) M Koryttseva	3	6	3
(Czech Republic) K Zakopalová	3	6	6
(Hungary) M Czink	6	4	3
(Belarus) O Govortsova	6	6^{0}	3
3	(China) J Zheng	4	7	6

Second round
(Ukraine) K Bondarenko	4	6^{5}
(Kazakhstan) G Voskoboeva	6	7
Q	(Romania) A Dulgheru	6	6
5	(Italy) S Errani	4	3
6/WC	(Slovakia) D Hantuchová	6	6
(Poland) U Radwańska	3	1
(Czech Republic) K Zakopalová	6	6
3	(China) J Zheng	0	4

Quarterfinals
(Kazakhstan) G Voskoboeva	1	5
Q	(Romania) A Dulgheru	6	7
6/WC	(Slovakia) D Hantuchová	6	4	6
(Czech Republic) K Zakopalová	3	6	4

Semifinals
Q	(Romania) A Dulgheru	6	6^{2}	6
6/WC	(Slovakia) D Hantuchová	4	7	1
