= 2000 Warsaw Cup by Heros =

- Date: 8–14 May
- Edition: 6th
- Category: Tier IV
- Draw: 32S / 16D
- Prize money: $110,000
- Surface: Clay
- Location: Warsaw, Poland
- Venue: Warszawianka Courts

Champions

Singles
- (Slovakia) Henrieta Nagyová

Doubles
- (Italy) Tathiana Garbin / (Slovakia) Janette Husárová
← 1999 ·	Warsaw Cup by Heros	· 2002 →

The 2000 Warsaw Cup by Heros was a Tier IV event on the 2000 WTA Tour that ran from 8 May until 14 May 2000. It was held on outdoor clay courts in Warsaw, Poland, and was the sixth edition of the tournament. Unseeded Henrieta Nagyová of Slovakia reached her third Warsaw Cup by Heros final and won the second singles title. The doubles tournament was won by Tathiana Garbin of Italy and Janette Husárová from Slovakia.

== Finals ==
=== Singles ===
(Slovakia) Henrieta Nagyová defeated (Netherlands) Amanda Hopmans 2–6, 6–4, 7–5

=== Doubles ===
(Italy) Tathiana Garbin / (Slovakia) Janette Husárová defeated (Uzbekistan) Iroda Tulyaganova / (Ukraine) Anna Zaporozhanova 6–3, 6–1
