= 2009 Warsaw Open =

- Date: 18–23 May
- Edition: 13th
- Category: WTA Premier
- Draw: 32S / 16D
- Prize money: $600,000
- Surface: Clay / outdoor
- Location: Warsaw, Poland
- Venue: Legia Tennis Centre

Champions

Singles
- (Romania) Alexandra Dulgheru

Doubles
- (United States) Raquel Kops-Jones / (United States) Bethanie Mattek-Sands
- Warsaw Open

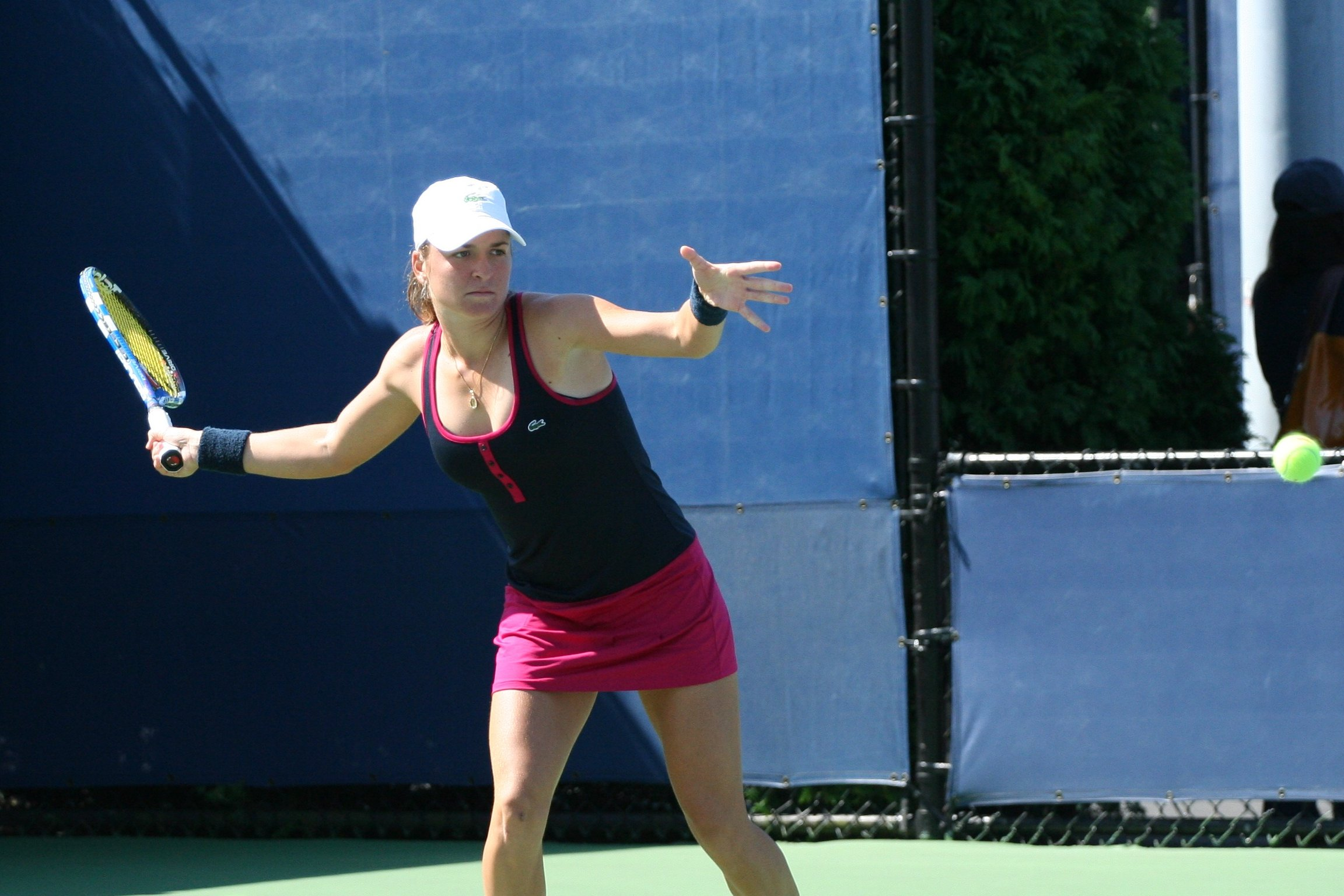

The 2009 Warsaw Open was a women's tennis tournament played on outdoor clay courts. It was the 13th edition of the Warsaw Open, part of the Premier-level tournaments of the 2009 WTA Tour. It took place at the Legia Tennis Centre in Warsaw, Poland, from 18 May until 23 May 2009. Unseeded Alexandra Dulgheru, who entered the main draw as a qualifier, won the singles title.

== Finals ==
=== Singles ===
(Romania) Alexandra Dulgheru defeated (Ukraine) Alona Bondarenko, 7–6^{(7–3)}, 3–6, 6–0

- It was Dulgheru's only singles title of the year and the 1st of her career.

=== Doubles ===
(United States) Raquel Kops-Jones / (United States) Bethanie Mattek-Sands defeated (China) Yan Zi / (China) Zheng Jie, 6–1, 6–1

== Entrants ==
=== Seeds ===
Player	Nationality	Ranking*	Seeding
Caroline Wozniacki	Denmark	11	1
Agnieszka Radwańska	Poland	12	2
Zheng Jie	China	17	3
Aleksandra Wozniak	Canada	25	4
Sara Errani	Italy	36	5
Daniela Hantuchová	Slovakia	39	6
Bethanie Mattek-Sands	United States	44	7
Alona Bondarenko	Ukraine	46	8
Tsvetana Pironkova	Bulgaria	47	9

- Seedings are based on the rankings of May 11, 2009.
- Agnieszka Radwańska withdrew due to a back injury, so Tsvetana Pironkova became the No. 9 seed.

=== Other entrants ===
The following players received wildcards into the main draw:

- (Slovakia) Daniela Hantuchová
- (Russia) Maria Sharapova
- (Poland) Katarzyna Piter

The following players received entry from the qualifying draw:

- (Romania) Ioana Raluca Olaru
- (Romania) Ágnes Szatmári
- (Romania) Alexandra Dulgheru
- (Hungary) Gréta Arn

The following players received entry as lucky losers:

- (Belarus) Darya Kustova
- (Slovakia) Lenka Tvarošková
