= Irina Selyutina =

Kazakhstani tennis player (born 1979)

Irina Selyutina Ирина Селютина
- Country (sports): Kazakhstan
- Residence: Alma-Ata, Kazakhstan
- Born: 7 November 1979 (age 46) Alma-Ata, Soviet Union
- Height: 1.78 m (5 ft 10 in)
- Turned pro: December 1996
- Retired: 2004
- Plays: Right-handed
- Prize money: $420,868

Singles
- Career record: 183–128
- Career titles: 8 ITF
- Highest ranking: No. 85 (14 January 2002)

Grand Slam singles results
- Australian Open: 1R (2002)
- French Open: 1R (2002)
- Wimbledon: 1R (2002)

Doubles
- Career record: 192–117
- Career titles: 3 WTA, 20 ITF
- Highest ranking: No. 31 (20 November 2000)

Grand Slam doubles results
- Australian Open: 2R (2001)
- French Open: 2R (2000)
- Wimbledon: 3R (2002)
- US Open: 3R (2000)

Team competitions
- Fed Cup: 2–4

Irina Gennadyevna Selyutina (Ирина Геннадьевна Селютина; born 7 November 1979) is a former tennis player from Kazakhstan.

She is a former world No. 1 in junior doubles, winning French Open and Wimbledon in 1997, partnering with Cara Black. Black and Selyutina were also crowned ITF Junior Girls Doubles World Champion in 1997. Selyutina won three doubles titles on the WTA Tour – J&S Cup with Cătălina Cristea in 1999, Canberra Women's Classic with Nannie De Villiers and Porto Open with Black in 2002. She also enjoyed success on the ITF Women's Circuit, winning eight singles and 20 doubles events.

== Personal life ==
Selyutina was born to Gennady and Tatyana Selyutina in Alma-Ata (Soviet Union then, Kazakhstan now). She has a brother, Nickolay. Selyutina began playing tennis at the age of eight, and has been coached by her first coach Valery Kovalyov for her entire career. She graduated from high school in 1996.

== WTA career finals ==
=== Doubles: 5 (3 titles, 2 runner-ups) ===
Legend
Grand Slam (0/0)
Tier I (0/0)
Tier II (0/0)
Tier III (0/1)
Tier IV & V (3/1)

Result	No.	Date	Tournament	Surface	Partner	Opponents	Score
Win	1.	May 1999	Warsaw, Poland	Clay	(Romania) Cătălina Cristea	(France) Amélie Cocheteux (Slovakia) Janette Husárová	6–1, 6–2
Loss	1.	Jun 2000	Birmingham, Great Britain	Grass	(Zimbabwe) Cara Black	(Australia) Rachel McQuillan (Australia) Lisa McShea	6–2, 2–6, 6–3
Win	2.	Jan 2002	Canberra, Australia	Hard	(South Africa) Nannie de Villiers	(United States) Samantha Reeves (Italy) Adriana Serra Zanetti	6–2, 6–3
Win	3.	Apr 2002	Porto, Portugal	Clay	(Zimbabwe) Cara Black	(Netherlands) Kristie Boogert (Spain) Magüi Serna	7–6^{(8–6)}, 6–4
Loss	2.	Sep 2002	Waikoloa, United States	Hard	(South Africa) Nannie de Villiers	(United States) Meilen Tu (Venezuela) María Vento-Kabchi	1–6, 6–2, 6–3

== ITF Circuit finals ==
$100,000 tournaments
$75,000 tournaments
$50,000 tournaments
$25,000 tournaments
$10,000 tournaments

=== Singles: 13 (8–5) ===
Outcome	No.	Date	Tournament	Surface	Opponent	Score
Winner	1.	24 November 1996	ITF São Paulo, Brazil	Clay	(Czech Republic) Zdeňka Málková	6–2, 6–4
Runner-up	1.	12 April 1998	ITF Dubai, United Arab Emirates	Hard	(Hungary) Kyra Nagy	4–6, 1–6
Runner-up	2.	24 May 1998	ITF Azeméis, Portugal	Hard	(Spain) Paula Hermida	1–6, 1–6
Runner-up	3.	21 November 1999	ITF Mount Gambier, Australia	Hard	(United States) Holly Parkinson	4–6, 0–6
Winner	2.	18 February 2001	ITF Sutton, Great Britain	Hard (i)	(Federal Republic of Yugoslavia) Dragana Zarić	6–3, 6–1
Winner	3.	22 April 2001	ITF Allentown, United States	Hard	(Russia) Evgenia Kulikovskaya	6–4, 6–1
Winner	4.	29 April 2001	ITF Jackson, United States	Clay	(Slovakia) Gabriela Voleková	6–1, 6–4
Winner	5.	6 May 2001	ITF Dothan, United States	Clay	(United States) Ashley Harkleroad	6–4, 6–2
Winner	6.	21 October 2001	ITF Southampton, Great Britain	Hard (i)	(Denmark) Eva Dyrberg	2–6, 6–4, 6–3
Runner-up	4.	28 October 2001	ITF Dallas, United States	Hard	(Venezuela) Milagros Sequera	7–5, 2–6, 0–6
Winner	7.	4 November 2001	ITF Hayward, United States	Hard	(Venezuela) Milagros Sequera	7–5, 6–4
Winner	8.	18 November 2001	ITF Hattiesburg, United States	Hard	(Netherlands) Seda Noorlander	6–2, 6–1
Runner-up	5.	21 July 2002	ITF Oyster Bay, United States	Hard	(South Korea) Cho Yoon-jeong	6–7^{(5–7)}, 4–6

=== Doubles: 28 (20–8) ===
Outcome	No.	Date	Tournament	Surface	Partner	Opponents	Score
Winner	1.	17 November 1996	ITF São Paulo, Brazil	Clay	(Zimbabwe) Cara Black	(Slovakia) Ľudmila Cervanová (Slovakia) Zuzana Váleková	4–6, 6–4, 6–3
Winner	2.	24 November 1996	ITF São Paulo, Brazil	Clay	(Zimbabwe) Cara Black	(Brazil) Miriam D'Agostini (Brazil) Vanessa Menga	3–6, 6–3, 6–2
Winner	3.	12 January 1997	ITF Delray Beach, United States	Hard	(Zimbabwe) Cara Black	(United States) Brie Rippner (United States) Paige Yaroshuk	6–3, 6–3
Winner	4.	12 April 1997	ITF Athens, Greece	Clay	(Zimbabwe) Cara Black	(Hungary) Virág Csurgó (Bulgaria) Svetlana Krivencheva	6–3, 6–4
Winner	5.	24 August 1997	ITF Kyiv, Ukraine	Clay	(Zimbabwe) Cara Black	(Russia) Natalia Egorova (Russia) Olga Ivanova	6–2, 6–4
Winner	6.	28 September 1997	ITF Tucumán, Argentina	Clay	(Zimbabwe) Cara Black	(Brazil) Miriam D'Agostini (Brazil) Vanessa Menga	6–3, 6–1
Runner-up	1.	24 May 1998	ITF Azeméis, Portugal	Hard	(Republic of Ireland) Kelly Liggan	(Portugal) Cristina Correia (Brazil) Bruna Colósio	2–6, 4–6
Winner	7.	4 October 1998	ITF Santa Clara, United States	Hard	(Zimbabwe) Cara Black	(Canada) Maureen Drake (United States) Lindsay Lee-Waters	6–4, 5–7, 6–3
Runner-up	2.	7 March 1999	ITF Dubai, United Arab Emirates	Hard	(Italy) Laura Golarsa	(Sweden) Åsa Carlsson (Belgium) Laurence Courtois	3–6, 7–6, 0–6
Winner	8.	31 October 1999	ITF Dallas, United States	Hard	(Switzerland) Emmanuelle Gagliardi	(United States) Samantha Reeves (South Africa) Jessica Steck	6–3, 6–3
Winner	9.	28 November 1999	ITF Nurioopta, Australia	Hard	(Australia) Louise Pleming	(Australia) Rachel McQuillan (Australia) Trudi Musgrave	6–4, 6–4
Runner-up	3.	22 July 2000	ITF Mahwah, United States	Hard	(Australia) Lisa McShea	(Australia) Evie Dominikovic (India) Nirupama Sanjeev	4–6, 4–6
Winner	10.	30 July 2000	ITF Salt Lake City, United States	Hard	(Australia) Lisa McShea	(United States) Samantha Reeves (South Africa) Jessica Steck	w/o
Runner-up	4.	11 February 2001	ITF Redbridge, Great Britain	Hard (i)	(Slovenia) Tina Križan	(United Kingdom) Julie Pullin (United Kingdom) Lorna Woodroffe	1–6, 3–6
Winner	11.	15 April 2001	ITF Columbus, United States	Hard (i)	(Australia) Lisa McShea	(United States) Amanda Augustus (United States) Sarah Taylor	6–1, 7–5
Winner	12.	22 April 2001	ITF Allentown, United States	Hard (i)	(Australia) Lisa McShea	(United States) Amanda Augustus (Czech Republic) Zuzana Lešenarová	7–5, 6–3
Winner	13.	29 April 2001	ITF Jackson, United States	Clay	(United States) Amanda Augustus	(Czech Republic) Zuzana Lešenarová (Austria) Nicole Melch	6–3, 6–3
Runner-up	5.	28 July 2001	ITF Ettenheim, Germany	Clay	(Hungary) Katalin Marosi	(Denmark) Eva Dyrberg (Slovenia) Maja Matevžič	w/o
Winner	14.	4 August 2001	ITF Saint-Gaudens, France	Clay	(France) Sarah Pitkowski-Malcor	(Spain) Lourdes Domínguez Lino (Spain) Gisela Riera	6–2, 6–3
Winner	15.	9 September 2001	ITF Denain, France	Clay	(France) Émilie Loit	(Netherlands) Debby Haak (Netherlands) Jolanda Mens	6–1, 6–3
Winner	16.	21 October 2001	ITF Southampton, Great Britain	Hard (i)	(South Africa) Nannie de Villiers	(Bulgaria) Lubomira Bacheva (Ukraine) Elena Tatarkova	7–6^{(7–5)}, 2–6, 6–2
Runner-up	6.	28 October 2001	ITF Dallas, United States	Hard	(South Africa) Nannie de Villiers	(Japan) Rika Hiraki (Japan) Nana Miyagi	6–7^{(4–7)}, 2–6
Winner	17.	4 November 2001	ITF Hayward, United States	Hard	(South Africa) Nannie de Villiers	(United States) Amanda Augustus (United States) Abigail Spears	6–0, 7–5
Runner-up	7.	9 June 2002	ITF Surbiton, Great Britain	Grass	(South Africa) Nannie de Villiers	(United Kingdom) Julie Pullin (United Kingdom) Lorna Woodroffe	2–6, 2–6
Runner-up	8.	21 July 2002	ITF Oyster Bay, United States	Hard	(Japan) Nana Miyagi	(United States) Jennifer Embry (United States) Jessica Lehnhoff	6–4, 4–6, 3–6
Winner	18.	28 July 2002	ITF Louisville, United States	Hard	(Japan) Nana Miyagi	(Japan) Miho Saeki (Czech Republic) Renata Voráčová	5–7, 6–1, 7–5
Winner	19.	3 August 2002	ITF Lexington, United States	Hard	(Japan) Nana Miyagi	(Australia) Rachel McQuillan (Australia) Lisa McShea	6–7^{(2–7)}, 6–2, 7–5
Winner	20.	22 September 2002	ITF Columbus, United States	Hard	(Australia) Lisa McShea	(United States) Teryn Ashley (United States) Ashley Harkleroad	w/o

== Awards ==
- 1997 – ITF Junior Girls Doubles World Champion (with Cara Black)

== Junior Grand Slam finals ==
=== Girls' doubles (2–0) ===
Outcome	Year	Tournament	Surface	Partner	Opponents	Score
Winner	1997	French Open	Clay	(Zimbabwe) Cara Black	(Slovenia) Maja Matevžič (Slovenia) Katarina Srebotnik	6–0, 5–7, 7–5
Winner	1997	Wimbledon	Grass	(Zimbabwe) Cara Black	(Slovenia) Maja Matevžič (Slovenia) Katarina Srebotnik	3–6, 7–5, 6–3

Preceded by Michaela Paštiková	ITF Junior Girls Doubles World Champion (with Cara Black); 1997	Succeeded by Eva Dyrberg
