= Amélie Cocheteux =

French tennis player

- Country (sports): France
- Born: 27 March 1978 (age 46); Amiens, France
- Height: 170 cm (5 ft 7 in)
- Turned pro: 1993
- Retired: 2001
- Prize money: $422.851

Singles
- Career record: 165–145
- Career titles: 4 ITF
- Highest ranking: No. 55 (10 May 1999)

Grand Slam singles results
- Australian Open: 2R (2000)
- French Open: 2R (1997)
- Wimbledon: 2R (1999)
- US Open: 3R (1999)

Doubles
- Career record: 52–69
- Highest ranking: No. 61 (18 September 2000)

Grand Slam doubles results
- Australian Open: 1R (2000)
- French Open: QF (2000)
- Wimbledon: QF (2000)
- US Open: 1R (1999)

Amélie Cocheteux (born 27 March 1978) is a former professional tennis player from France. She reached her career-high ranking of No. 55 in the world on 10 May 1999. She defeated world No. 10, Nathalie Tauziat in the Prostějov tournament in 1999. As a junior, she won the 1995 French Open title.

In 2000, Cocheteux and another French player, Anne-Gaëlle Sidot, were accused of racism by Alexandra Stevenson. Cocheteux allegedly used a racial remark to Stevenson whilst bumping into her in the locker room. Cocheteux denied the claims, and no action was taken by the WTA Tour.

Her results seriously deteriorated throughout the year, ending it with an 8–26 record and dropping out of the top 100. In 2001, she played just three events on the ITF Circuit, losing first round in all of them, and stopped playing on the women's tour at the age of just 23.

== WTA Tour finals ==
=== Doubles: 1 (runner-up) ===
Legend
Grand Slam (0/0)
Tier I (0/0)
Tier II (0/0)
Tier III (0/0)
Tier IV & V (0/1)

Result	Date	Tournament	Surface	Partner	Opponents	Score
Loss	9 May 1999	Warsaw, Poland	Clay	(Slovakia) Janette Husárová	(Romania) Cătălina Cristea (Kazakhstan) Irina Selyutina	1–6, 2–6

== ITF finals ==
=== Singles (4–5) ===
$100,000 tournaments
$75,000 tournaments
$50,000 tournaments
$25,000 tournaments
$10,000 tournaments

Result	No.	Date	Tournament	Surface	Opponent	Score
Loss	1.	17 April 1995	Murcia, Spain	Clay	(Spain) Ana Alcázar	0–6, 1–6
Win	2.	14 May 1995	Le Touquet, France	Clay	(Belgium) Patty Van Acker	6–2, 6–1
Loss	3.	11 February 1996	Mar del Plata, Argentina	Clay	(Italy) Gloria Pizzichini	2–6, 4–6
Loss	4.	3 November 1996	Poitiers, France	Hard (i)	(France) Noëlle van Lottum	6–1, 3–6, 2–6
Win	5.	22 June 1997	Marseille, France	Clay	(Croatia) Mirjana Lučić-Baroni	4–6, 7–5, 6–4
Loss	6.	2 November 1997	Poitiers, France	Clay	(Netherlands) Kristie Boogert	4–6, 5–7
Win	7.	7 June 1998	Surbiton, United Kingdom	Grass	(Netherlands) Seda Noorlander	6–2, 6–4
Loss	8.	18 October 1998	Southampton, United Kingdom	Carpet (i)	(France) Anne-Gaëlle Sidot	5–7, 4–6
Win	9.	25 October 1998	Joué-lès-Tours, France	Hard (i)	(France) Stéphanie Foretz	6–1, 6–1

=== Doubles (0–3) ===
Result	No	Date	Tournament	Surface	Partner	Opponents	Score
Loss	1.	7 November 1994	Giza, Egypt	Clay	(France) Caroline Toyre	(Hungary) Ágnes Muzamel (Greece) Christina Zachariadou	7–6^{(8–6)}, 2–6, 3–6
Loss	2.	18 October 1998	Southampton, United Kingdom	Carpet (i)	(France) Émilie Loit	(Belgium) Els Callens (Belgium) Laurence Courtois	2–6, 2–6
Loss	3.	25 October 1998	Joué-lès-Tours, France	Hard (i)	(France) Émilie Loit	(Czech Republic) Lenka Cenková (Czech Republic) Eva Martincová	6–3, 4–6, 5–7
