= Inés Gorrochategui =

Argentine tennis player

- Country (sports): Argentina
- Born: 13 June 1973 (age 53) Córdoba, Argentina
- Height: 1.69 m (5 ft 6 1/2 in)
- Plays: Right-handed (one handed-backhand)
- Prize money: $976,039

Singles
- Career record: 210–117
- Career titles: 0
- Highest ranking: No. 19 (17 October 1994)

Grand Slam singles results
- Australian Open: 3R (1993, 1997)
- French Open: QF (1994)
- Wimbledon: 4R (1995)
- US Open: 3R (1996)

Doubles
- Career record: 182–111
- Career titles: 7
- Highest ranking: No. 9 (22 May 1995)

Grand Slam doubles results
- Australian Open: 3R (1993, 1994)
- French Open: SF (1993, 1994)
- Wimbledon: 2R (1995, 1996, 1999)
- US Open: F (1993)

Inés Gorrochategui (born 13 June 1973) is a former professional female tennis player from Argentina. She reached her career-high singles ranking world No. 19 on October 17, 1994. Her best performance at a Grand Slam championship came when she got to the quarterfinals of the 1994 French Open, defeating Michelle Jaggard-Lai, Naoko Sawamatsu, Helena Suková and Iva Majoli before losing to Steffi Graf. Inés Gorrochategui represented her country regularly in the Fed Cup from 1990 to 1999, reaching the semi-finals in 1993 with Labat and Tarabini.

== WTA career finals ==
=== Doubles: 14 (7 titles, 7 runner-ups) ===
Legend Grand Slam tournaments (0–1) Tier I (1–0) Tier II (1–5) Tier III, IV & V (4–2)	Finals by surface Hard (0–1) Grass (0–2) Clay (5–4) Carpet (1–1)

Result	W/L	Date	Tournament	Surface	Partner	Opponents	Score
Win	1–0	Dec 1991	São Paulo, Brazil	Clay	(Argentina) Mercedes Paz	(United States) Renata Baranski (United States) Laura Glitz	6–2, 6–2
Win	2–0	Apr 1992	Taranto, Italy	Clay	(South Africa) Amanda Coetzer	(Australia) Rachel McQuillan (Czechoslovakia) Radka Zrubáková	4–6, 6–3, 7–6^{(0)}
Loss	2–1	Apr 1993	Amelia Island, US	Clay	(South Africa) Amanda Coetzer	(Switzerland) Manuela Maleeva-Fragniere (Georgia (country)) Leila Meskhi	6–3, 3–6, 4–6
Win	3–1	Jul 1993	Prague, Czech Republic	Clay	(Argentina) Patricia Tarabini	(Italy) Laura Golarsa (Netherlands) Caroline Vis	6–2, 6–1
Loss	3–2	Aug 1993	US Open	Hard	(South Africa) Amanda Coetzer	(Spain) Arantxa Sánchez Vicario (Czech Republic) Helena Suková	4–6, 2–6
Win	4–2	Oct 1993	Budapest, Hungary	Carpet (i)	(Netherlands) Caroline Vis	(Italy) Sandra Cecchini (Argentina) Patricia Tarabini	6–1, 6–3
Loss	4–3	Nov 1993	San Jose, US	Carpet (i)	(South Africa) Amanda Coetzer	(United States) Patty Fendick (United States) Meredith McGrath	2–6, 0–6
Loss	4–4	Apr 1994	Amelia Island, US	Clay	(South Africa) Amanda Coetzer	(Latvia) Larisa Neiland (Spain) Arantxa Sánchez Vicario	2–6, 7–6^{(6)}, 4–6
Loss	4–5	Jun 1994	Eastbourne, UK	Grass	(Czech Republic) Helena Suková	(United States) Gigi Fernández (Belarus) Natasha Zvereva	7–6^{(7–4)}, 4–6, 3–6
Win	5–5	Apr 1995	Amelia Island, US	Clay	(South Africa) Amanda Coetzer	(United States) Nicole Arendt (Netherlands) Manon Bollegraf	6–2, 3–6, 6–2
Win	6–5	May 1995	Berlin, Germany	Clay	(South Africa) Amanda Coetzer	(Latvia) Larisa Neiland (Argentina) Gabriela Sabatini	4–6, 7–6^{(3)}, 6–2
Loss	6–6	May 1997	Madrid, Spain	Clay	(Romania) Irina Spîrlea	(United States) Mary Joe Fernández (Spain) Arantxa Sánchez Vicario	3–6, 2–6
Win	7–6	Jul 1997	Warsaw, Poland	Clay	(Romania) Ruxandra Dragomir	(Australia) Catherine Barclay (Germany) Meike Babel	6–4, 6–0
Loss	7–7	Jun 1999	Birmingham, UK	Grass	(France) Alexandra Fusai	(United States) Corina Morariu (Latvia) Larisa Neiland	4–6, 4–6

=== Singles (3 runner-ups) ===
Result	W/L	Date	Tournament	Tier	Surface	Opponent	Score
Loss	0–1	Feb 1991	Paris, France	Tier IV	Clay	(Spain) Conchita Martínez	0–6, 3–6
Loss	0–2	Feb 1994	Auckland, New Zealand	Tier IV	Hard	(United States) Ginger Helgeson-Nielsen	6–7^{(4–7)}, 3–6
Loss	0–3	May 1999	Warsaw Open, Poland	Tier IV	Clay	(Spain) Cristina Torrens Valero	5–7, 6–7^{(3–7)}

== ITF finals ==
$100,000 tournaments
$75,000 tournaments
$50,000 tournaments
$25,000 tournaments
$10,000 tournaments

=== Singles: 8 (7–1) ===
Result	No.	Date	Tournament	Surface	Opponent	Score
Win	1.	23 October 1989	ITF São Paulo, Brazil	Clay	(Brazil) Rita Cruz Lima	7–5, 6–0
Win	2.	13 November 1989	ITF Lima, Peru	Clay	(Brazil) Tatiana Buss	6–2, 6–4
Win	3.	8 October 1990	ITF Lima, Peru	Clay	(Chile) Macarena Miranda	6–4, 6–3
Win	4.	15 October 1990	ITF La Paz, Bolivia	Hard	(United States) Jolene Watanabe	6–2, 3–6, 6–1
Win	5.	22 October 1990	ITF Santiago, Chile	Clay	(Chile) Macarena Miranda	6–2, 6–2
Win	6.	29 October 1990	ITF Buenos Aires, Argentina	Clay	(Argentina) Gabriela Mosca	3–6, 6–2, 6–4
Loss	7.	6 May 1991	ITF Porto, Portugal	Clay	(South Africa) Mariaan de Swardt	1–6, 2–6
Win	8.	27 May 1991	ITF Brindisi, Italy	Clay	(Italy) Flora Perfetti	7–5, 6–3

=== Doubles: 8 (7–1) ===
Result	No.	Date	Tournament	Surface	Partner	Opponents	Score
Win	1.	23 October 1989	ITF São Paulo, Brazil	Clay	(United States) Karen Buchholz	(Brazil) Sabrina Giusto (Brazil) Maria Pilar Valls	6–3, 2–6, 7–6
Win	2.	13 November 1989	ITF Lima, Peru	Clay	(United States) Karen Buchholz	(Brazil) Roberta Borrelli (Brazil) Lucia Peria	7–5, 6–3
Win	3.	27 November 1989	ITF Buenos Aires, Argentina	Clay	(Argentina) María Eugenia Vago	(Argentina) Florencia Labat (Argentina) Andrea Tiezzi	6–3, 2–6, 6–4
Loss	4.	15 October 1990	ITF La Paz, Bolivia	Hard	(Argentina) Paula Boccia	(Chile) Paula Cabezas (Paraguay) Sandra Ugarriza	2–6, 6–4, 5–7
Win	5.	22 October 1990	ITF Santiago, Chile	Clay	(Uruguay) Patricia Miller	(Chile) Paula Cabezas (Paraguay) Sandra Ugarriza	3–6, 6–1, 7–5
Win	6.	29 October 1990	ITF Buenos Aires, Argentina	Clay	(Argentina) Gabriela Mosca	(Argentina) Vanessa Falter (Paraguay) Valeria Falter	6–2, 6–0
Win	7.	15 April 1991	ITF Caserta, Italy	Clay	(Brazil) Andrea Vieira	(United States) Jennifer Fuchs (Sweden) Maria Strandlund	6–2, 6–2
Win	8.	29 May 1991	ITF Brindisi, Italy	Clay	(Uruguay) Patricia Miller	(Slovakia) Katarína Studeníková (Romania) Irina Spîrlea	6–1, 7–6
