= WTA Tier III tournaments =

Tennis tournament category

The WTA Tier III tournaments were Women's Tennis Association tennis third-level tournaments held from 1990 until the end of the 2008 season. The line-up of events varied over the years due to tournaments being promoted, demoted or cancelled.

From 2009, most Tier III and Tier IV tournaments from previous seasons became WTA International Tournaments owing to a category change. The main reason for the changes was to ease the pressure on players in terms of the number of tournaments that they were required to play.

== Events ==
Tournament	Complete sponsored name	City(s)	Country ^{A}	Court surface	Tier III from	Years	Current/ Defunct
VS of Houston	Virginia Slims of Houston	Houston	United States	Clay	1990	1	
Tampa	Eckerd Open	Tampa, Florida	United States	Clay	1990	1	
Newport	Virginia Slims of Newport	Newport	United States	Grass	1990	1	
San Diego	Toshiba Classic	San Diego	United States	Hard	1990–91	2	
San Antonio	New Haven Open at Yale	San Antonio	United States	Hard	1990–92	3	
Sydney	New South Wales Open	Sydney	Australia	Hard	1990–92	3	Current
Leipzig	Sparkassen Cup	Leipzig	Germany	Carpet (i)	1990–92	3	
Barcelona	Barcelona Ladies Open	Barcelona	Spain	Clay	1991–92	2	Current
Lucerne	European Open	Lucerne	Switzerland	Clay	1992–94	3	
Osaka	Asian Open	Osaka	Japan	Carpet (i)	1992–94	3	
Budapest	GDF Suez Grand Prix	Budapest	Hungary	Carpet (i) (1993); Clay (2007–08)	1993; 2007–08	3	Current
Kitzbühel	WTA Austrian Open	Kitzbühel	Austria	Clay	1993	1	
Schenectady	OTB International Open	Schenectady	United States	Hard	1993–94	2	
Brisbane	Danone Hardcourt Championships	Brisbane	Australia	Hard	1993–94	2	
Linz	Generali Ladies Linz	Linz	Austria	Carpet (i)	1993–97	5	Current
Oklahoma City; Memphis	Cellular South Cup	Oklahoma City (1993–2001); Memphis (2002–08)	United States	Hard (i)	1993–2008	16	
Strasbourg	Internationaux de Strasbourg	Strasbourg	France	Clay	1993–2008	16	Current
Tokyo Outdoor	Rakuten Japan Open Tennis Championships	Tokyo	Japan	Hard	1993–2008	16	
Birmingham	Aegon Classic	Birmingham	United Kingdom	Grass	1993–2008	16	Current
Quebec City	Challenge Bell	Quebec City	Canada	Carpet (i)	1993–2008	16	Current
Moscow	Kremlin Cup	Moscow	Russia	Carpet (i)	1994–96	3	Current
San Juan	Puerto Rico Open	San Juan	Puerto Rico, USA	Hard	1995	1	
Zagreb; Bol	Croatian Bol Ladies Open	Zagreb (1995); Bol (2000–03)	Croatia	Clay	1995; 2000–2003	5	
Jakarta	Danamon Open	Jakarta	Indonesia	Hard	1995–96	2	
Warsaw	Warsaw Open	Warsaw	Poland	Clay	1995–98; 2002–10	5	
Luxembourg City	BGL Luxembourg Open	Luxembourg City	Luxembourg	Carpet (i) (1996–2000); Hard (i) (2001–04, 2008)	1996–2004; 2008	10	Current
's-Hertogenbosch	Ordina Open	's-Hertogenbosch	Netherlands	Grass	1996–2008	13	Current
Madrid	Madrid Open	Madrid	Spain	Clay	1997–2003	7	
Gold Coast	Brisbane International	Gold Coast	Australia	Hard	1997–2008	12	
Prague	ECM Prague Open	Prague	Czech Republic	Clay	1998	1	
VS of Boston	Virginia Slims of Boston	Boston, Massachusetts	United States	Hard	1998	1	
Cairo	Dreamland Egypt Classic	Cairo	Egypt	Clay	1999	1	
Sopot	Orange Warsaw Open	Sopot	Poland	Clay	1999–2004	6	
Kuala Lumpur; Bali	Wismilak International (1999–2006); Commonwealth Bank Tennis Classic (2007–08)	Kuala Lumpur (1999–2000); Bali (2001–08)	Malaysia; Indonesia	Hard	1999–2008	10	
Vienna	WTA Austrian Open	Klagenfurt (2000); Vienna (2001–04)	Austria	Clay	2000–04	5	
Canberra	Canberra International	Canberra	Australia	Hard	2001	1	
Doha	Qatar Ladies Open	Doha	Qatar	Hard	2001–03	3	
Bogotá	Copa Sony Ericsson Colsanitas	Bogotá	Colombia	Clay	2001–08	8	Current
Acapulco	Abierto Mexicano Telcel HSBC	Acapulco	Mexico	Clay	2001–08	8	Current
Hasselt	Gaz de France Stars	Hasselt	Belgium	Hard (i)	2004–06	3	
Cincinnati	Western & Southern Open	Cincinnati	United States	Hard	2004–2008	5	Current
Guangzhou	Guangzhou International Women's Open	Guangzhou	China	Hard	2004–08	5	Current
Bangkok	PTT Bangkok Open	Bangkok	Thailand	Hard	2005–07	3	
Kolkata	Sunfeast Open	Kolkata	India	Hard (i)	2005–07	3	
Istanbul	İstanbul Cup	Istanbul	Turkey	Clay	2005–08	4	Current
Bangalore	Bangalore Open	Bangalore	India	Hard	2006–08	3	
Bad Gastein	Gastein Ladies	Bad Gastein	Austria	Clay	2007–08	2	Current
Viña del Mar	Cachantún Cup	Viña del Mar	Chile	Clay	2008	1	

== Results ==
=== 1990 ===
Tournament	Winner	Runner-up	Score
Sydney	(Soviet Union) Natasha Zvereva	(Austria) Barbara Paulus	6–4, 6–0
San Antonio	(Socialist Federal Republic of Yugoslavia) Monica Seles	(Switzerland) Manuela Maleeva-Fragniere	6–4, 6–3
Houston	(Bulgaria) Katerina Maleeva	(Spain) Arantxa Sánchez Vicario	6–1, 1–6, 6–4
Tampa	(Socialist Federal Republic of Yugoslavia) Monica Seles	(Bulgaria) Katerina Maleeva	6–1, 6–0
Newport	(Spain) Arantxa Sánchez Vicario	(United Kingdom) Jo Durie	7–6^{(7–2)}, 4–6, 7–5
San Diego	(Germany) Steffi Graf	(Switzerland) Manuela Maleeva-Fragniere	6–3, 6–2
Leipzig	(Germany) Steffi Graf	(Spain) Arantxa Sánchez Vicario	6–1, 6–1

=== 1991 ===
Tournament	Winner	Runner-up	Score
Sydney	(Czechoslovakia) Jana Novotná	(Spain) Arantxa Sánchez Vicario	6–4, 6–2
San Antonio	(Germany) Steffi Graf	(Socialist Federal Republic of Yugoslavia) Monica Seles	6–4, 6–3
Barcelona	(Spain) Conchita Martínez	(Switzerland) Manuela Maleeva-Fragniere	6–4, 6–1
San Diego	(United States) Jennifer Capriati	(Socialist Federal Republic of Yugoslavia) Monica Seles	4–6, 6–1, 7–6^{(7–2)}
Leipzig	(Germany) Steffi Graf	(Czechoslovakia) Jana Novotná	6–3, 6–3
Milan	(Socialist Federal Republic of Yugoslavia) Monica Seles	(United States) Martina Navratilova	6–3, 3–6, 6–4

=== 1992 ===
Tournament	Winner	Runner-up	Score
Sydney	(Argentina) Gabriela Sabatini	(Spain) Arantxa Sánchez Vicario	6–1, 6–1
San Antonio	(United States) Martina Navratilova	(France) Nathalie Tauziat	6–2, 6–1
Barcelona	(Socialist Federal Republic of Yugoslavia) Monica Seles	(Spain) Arantxa Sánchez Vicario	3–6, 6–2, 6–3
San Diego	(United States) Jennifer Capriati	(Spain) Conchita Martínez	6–3, 6–2
Leipzig	(Germany) Steffi Graf	(Czechoslovakia) Jana Novotná	6–3, 1–6, 6–4

=== 1993 ===
Tournament	Winner	Runner-up	Score
Brisbane	(Spain) Conchita Martínez	(Bulgaria) Magdalena Maleeva	6–3, 6–4
Osaka	(Czech Republic) Jana Novotná	(Japan) Kimiko Date	6–3, 6–2
Oklahoma City	(United States) Zina Garrison-Jackson	(United States) Patty Fendick	6–2, 6–2
Linz	(Switzerland) Manuela Maleeva-Fragnière	(Spain) Conchita Martínez	6–3, 1–0 ret.
Tokyo	(Japan) Kimiko Date	(Netherlands) Stephanie Rottier	6–1, 6–3
Lucerne	(United States) Lindsay Davenport	(Australia) Nicole Provis	6–1, 4–6, 6–2
Strasbourg	(Japan) Naoko Sawamatsu	(Austria) Judith Wiesner	4–6, 6–1, 6–3
Birmingham	(United States) Lori McNeil	(United States) Zina Garrison-Jackson	6–4, 2–6, 6–3
Kitzbühel	(Germany) Anke Huber	(Austria) Judith Wiesner	6–4, 6–1
Schenectady	(Latvia) Larisa Neiland	(Ukraine) Natalia Medvedeva	6–3, 7–5
Budapest	(United States) Zina Garrison-Jackson	(Belgium) Sabine Appelmans	7–5, 6–2
Quebec City	(France) Nathalie Tauziat	(Bulgaria) Katerina Maleeva	6–4, 6–1

=== 1994 ===
Tournament	Winner	Runner-up	Score
Brisbane	(United States) Lindsay Davenport	(Argentina) Florencia Labat	6–1, 2–6, 6–3
Linz	(Belgium) Sabine Appelmans	(Germany) Meike Babel	6–1, 4–6, 7–6^{(7–3)}
Osaka	(Switzerland) Manuela Maleeva-Fragnière	(Croatia) Iva Majoli	6–1, 4–6, 7–5
Oklahoma City	(United States) Meredith McGrath	(Netherlands) Brenda Schultz	7–6^{(8–6)}, 7–6^{(7–4)}
Tokyo	(Japan) Kimiko Date	(United States) Amy Frazier	7–5, 6–0
Lucerne	(United States) Lindsay Davenport	(United States) Lisa Raymond	7–6^{(7–3)} , 6–4
Strasbourg	(United States) Mary Joe Fernández	(Argentina) Gabriela Sabatini	2–6, 6–4, 6–0
Birmingham	(United States) Lori McNeil	(United States) Zina Garrison-Jackson	6–2, 6–2
Schenectady	(Austria) Judith Wiesner	(Latvia) Larisa Neiland	7–5, 3–6, 6–4
Moscow	(Bulgaria) Magdalena Maleeva	(Italy) Sandra Cecchini	7–5, 6–1
Quebec City	(Bulgaria) Katerina Maleeva	(Netherlands) Brenda Schultz	6–3, 6–3

=== 1995 ===
Tournament	Winner	Runner-up	Score
Jakarta	(Germany) Sabine Hack	(Romania) Irina Spîrlea	2–6, 7–6^{(8–6)}, 6–4
Oklahoma City	(Netherlands) Brenda Schultz	(Kazakhstan) Elena Likhovtseva	6–1, 6–2
Linz	(Czech Republic) Jana Novotná	(Germany) Barbara Rittner	6–7^{(6–8)}, 6–3, 6–4
San Juan	(South Africa) Joannette Kruger	(Japan) Kyōko Nagatsuka	7–6^{(7–5)}, 6–3
Tokyo	(United States) Amy Frazier	(Japan) Kimiko Date	7–6^{(7–5)}, 7–5
Zagreb	(Belgium) Sabine Appelmans	(Germany) Silke Meier	6–4, 6–3
Strasbourg	(United States) Lindsay Davenport	(Japan) Kimiko Date	3–6, 6–1, 6–2
Birmingham	(United States) Zina Garrison-Jackson	(United States) Lori McNeil	6–3, 6–3
Warsaw	(Austria) Barbara Paulus	(France) Alexandra Fusai	7–6^{(7–4)}, 4–6, 6–1
Moscow	(Bulgaria) Magdalena Maleeva	(Russia) Elena Makarova	6–4, 6–2
Quebec City	(Netherlands) Brenda Schultz-McCarthy	(Belgium) Dominique Monami	7–6^{(7–5)}, 6–2

=== 1996 ===
Tournament	Winner	Runner-up	Score
Oklahoma City	(Netherlands) Brenda Schultz-McCarthy	(South Africa) Amanda Coetzer	6–3, 6–2
Linz	(Belgium) Sabine Appelmans	(France) Julie Halard-Decugis	6–2, 6–4
Jakarta	(United States) Linda Wild	(Indonesia) Yayuk Basuki	walkover
Tokyo	(Japan) Kimiko Date	(United States) Amy Frazier	7–5, 6–4
Strasbourg	(United States) Lindsay Davenport	(Austria) Barbara Paulus	6–3, 7–6^{(8–6)}
Birmingham	(United States) Meredith McGrath	(France) Nathalie Tauziat	2–6, 6–4, 6–4
Rosmalen	(Germany) Anke Huber	(Czech Republic) Helena Suková	6–4, 7–6^{(7–2)}
Warsaw	(Slovakia) Henrieta Nagyová	(Austria) Barbara Paulus	3–6, 6–2, 6–1
Quebec City	(United States) Lisa Raymond	(Belgium) Els Callens	6–4, 6–4
Kockelscheuer	(Germany) Anke Huber	(Slovakia) Karina Habšudová	6–3, 6–0
Moscow	(Spain) Conchita Martínez	(Austria) Barbara Paulus	6–1, 4–6, 6–4

=== 1997 ===
Tournament	Winner	Runner-up	Score
Hope Island	(Russia) Elena Likhovtseva	(Japan) Ai Sugiyama	3–6, 7–6^{(9–7)}, 6–3
Linz	(United States) Chanda Rubin	(Slovakia) Karina Habšudová	6–4, 6–2
Oklahoma City	(United States) Lindsay Davenport	(United States) Lisa Raymond	6–4, 6–2
Tokyo	(Japan) Ai Sugiyama	(United States) Amy Frazier	4–6, 6–4, 6–4
Madrid	(Czech Republic) Jana Novotná	(United States) Monica Seles	7–5, 6–1
Strasbourg	(Germany) Steffi Graf	(Croatia) Mirjana Lučić	6–2, 7–5
Birmingham	(France) Nathalie Tauziat	(Indonesia) Yayuk Basuki	2–6, 6–2, 6–2
's-Hertogenbosch	(Romania) Ruxandra Dragomir	(Netherlands) Miriam Oremans	5–7, 6–2, 6–4
Warsaw	(Austria) Barbara Paulus	(Slovakia) Henrieta Nagyová	6–4, 6–4
Kockelscheuer	(South Africa) Amanda Coetzer	(Austria) Barbara Paulus	6–4, 3–6, 7–5
Quebec City	(Netherlands) Brenda Schultz-McCarthy	(Belgium) Dominique Van Roost	6–4, 6–7^{(4–7)}, 7–5

=== 1998 ===
Tournament	Winner	Runner-up	Score
Gold Coast	(Japan) Ai Sugiyama	(Venezuela) María Vento	7–5, 6–0
Oklahoma City	(United States) Venus Williams	(South Africa) Joannette Kruger	6–3, 6–2
Tokyo	(Japan) Ai Sugiyama	(United States) Corina Morariu	6–3, 6–3
Madrid	(Switzerland) Patty Schnyder	(Belgium) Dominique Van Roost	3–6, 6–4, 6–0
Strasbourg	(Romania) Irina Spîrlea	(France) Julie Halard-Decugis	7–6^{(7–5)}, 6–3
Birmingham	Final and semifinals cancelled due to rain		
's-Hertogenbosch	(France) Julie Halard-Decugis	(Netherlands) Miriam Oremans	6–3, 6–4
Prague	(Czech Republic) Jana Novotná	(France) Sandrine Testud	6–3, 6–0
Warsaw	(Spain) Conchita Martínez	(Italy) Silvia Farina	6–0, 6–3
Boston	(South Africa) Mariaan de Swardt	(Austria) Barbara Schett	3–6, 7–6^{(7–4)}, 7–5
Kockelscheuer	(France) Mary Pierce	(Italy) Silvia Farina	6–0, 2–0 ret.
Quebec City	(United States) Tara Snyder	(United States) Chanda Rubin	4–6, 6–4, 7–6^{(8–6)}

=== 1999 ===
Tournament	Winner	Runner-up	Score
Gold Coast	(Switzerland) Patty Schnyder	(France) Mary Pierce	4–6, 7–6^{(7–5)}, 6–2
Oklahoma City	(United States) Venus Williams	(South Africa) Amanda Coetzer	6–4, 6–0
Tokyo	(United States) Amy Frazier	(Japan) Ai Sugiyama	6–2, 6–2
Cairo	(Spain) Arantxa Sánchez Vicario	(Romania) Irina Spîrlea	6–1, 6–0
Strasbourg	(United States) Jennifer Capriati	(Russia) Elena Likhovtseva	6–1, 6–3
Madrid	(United States) Lindsay Davenport	(Argentina) Paola Suárez	6–1, 6–3
Birmingham	(France) Julie Halard-Decugis	(France) Nathalie Tauziat	6–2, 3–6, 6–4
's-Hertogenbosch	(Puerto Rico) Kristina Brandi	(Croatia) Silvija Talaja	6–0, 3–6, 6–1
Warsaw	(Spain) Conchita Martínez	(Slovakia) Karina Habšudová	6–1, 6–1
Kockelscheuer	(Belgium) Kim Clijsters	(Belgium) Dominique van Roost	6–2, 6–2
Quebec City	(United States) Jennifer Capriati	(United States) Chanda Rubin	4–6, 6–1, 6–2
Kuala Lumpur	(Sweden) Åsa Carlsson	(United States) Erika deLone	6–2, 6–4

=== 2000 ===
Tournament	Winner	Runner-up	Score
Gold Coast	(Croatia) Silvija Talaja	(Spain) Conchita Martínez	6–0, 0–6, 6–4
Oklahoma City	(United States) Monica Seles	(France) Nathalie Dechy	6–1, 7–6^{(7–3)}
Bol	(Croatia) Tina Pisnik	(France) Amélie Mauresmo	7–6^{(7–4)}, 7–6^{(7–2)}
Strasbourg	(Croatia) Silvija Talaja	(Hungary) Rita Kuti-Kis	7–5, 4–6, 6–3
Madrid	(Spain) Gala León García	(Colombia) Fabiola Zuluaga	4–6, 6–2, 6–2
Birmingham	(United States) Lisa Raymond	(Thailand) Tamarine Tanasugarn	6–2, 6–7^{(7–9)}, 6–4
's-Hertogenbosch	(Switzerland) Martina Hingis	(Romania) Ruxandra Dragomir	6–2, 3–0 ret.
Klagenfurt	(Austria) Barbara Schett	(Switzerland) Patty Schnyder	5–7, 6–4, 6–4
Sopot	(Germany) Anke Huber	(Spain) Gala León García	7–6^{(7–4)}, 6–3
Kockelscheuer	(United States) Jennifer Capriati	(Bulgaria) Magdalena Maleeva	4–6, 6–1, 6–4
Tokyo	(France) Julie Halard-Decugis	(United States) Amy Frazier	5–7, 7–5, 6–4
Quebec City	(United States) Chanda Rubin	(United States) Jennifer Capriati	6–4, 6–2
Kuala Lumpur	(Slovakia) Henrieta Nagyová	(Croatia) Iva Majoli	6–4, 6–2

=== 2001 ===
Tournament	Winner	Runner-up	Score
Gold Coast	(Belgium) Justine Henin	(Italy) Silvia Farina Elia	7–6^{(7–5)}, 6–4
Canberra	(Belgium) Justine Henin	(France) Sandrine Testud	6–2, 6–2
Doha	(Switzerland) Martina Hingis	(France) Sandrine Testud	6–3, 6–2
Bogotá	(Argentina) Paola Suárez	(Hungary) Rita Kuti-Kis	6–2, 6–4
Oklahoma City	(United States) Monica Seles	(United States) Jennifer Capriati	6–3, 5–7, 6–2
Acapulco	(South Africa) Amanda Coetzer	(Russia) Elena Dementieva	2–6, 6–1, 6–2
Bol	(Spain) Ángeles Montolio	(Argentina) Mariana Díaz Oliva	3–6, 6–2, 6–4
Strasbourg	(Italy) Silvia Farina Elia	(Germany) Anke Huber	7–5, 0–6, 6–4
Madrid	(Spain) Arantxa Sánchez Vicario	(Spain) Ángeles Montolio	7–5, 6–0
Birmingham	(France) Nathalie Tauziat	(Netherlands) Miriam Oremans	6–3, 7–5
's-Hertogenbosch	(Belgium) Justine Henin	(Belgium) Kim Clijsters	6–4, 3–6, 6–3
Vienna	(Uzbekistan) Iroda Tulyaganova	(Switzerland) Patty Schnyder	6–3, 6–2
Sopot	(Spain) Cristina Torrens Valero	(Spain) Gala León García	6–2, 6–2
Quebec City	(United States) Meghann Shaughnessy	(Croatia) Iva Majoli	6–1, 6–3
Bali	(Indonesia) Angelique Widjaja	(South Africa) Joannette Kruger	7–6^{(7–2)}, 7–6^{(7–4)}
Tokyo	(United States) Monica Seles	(Thailand) Tamarine Tanasugarn	6–3, 6–2
Kockelscheuer	(Belgium) Kim Clijsters	(United States) Lisa Raymond	6–2, 6–2

=== 2002 ===
Tournament	Winner	Runner-up	Score
Gold Coast	(United States) Venus Williams	(Belgium) Justine Henin	7–5, 6–2
Doha	(United States) Monica Seles	(Thailand) Tamarine Tanasugarn	7–6^{(8–6)}, 6–3
Memphis	(United States) Lisa Raymond	(United States) Alexandra Stevenson	4–6, 6–3, 7–6^{(11–9)}
Bogotá	(Colombia) Fabiola Zuluaga	(Slovenia) Katarina Srebotnik	6–1, 6–4
Acapulco	(Slovenia) Katarina Srebotnik	(Argentina) Paola Suárez	6–7^{(1–7)}, 6–4, 6–2
Bol	(Sweden) Åsa Svensson	(Croatia) Iva Majoli	6–3, 4–6, 6–1
Warsaw	(Russia) Elena Bovina	(Slovakia) Henrieta Nagyová	6–3, 6–1
Madrid	(United States) Monica Seles	(United States) Chanda Rubin	6–4, 6–2
Strasbourg	(Italy) Silvia Farina Elia	(Federal Republic of Yugoslavia) Jelena Dokić	6–4, 3–6, 6–3
Birmingham	(Federal Republic of Yugoslavia) Jelena Dokić	(Russia) Anastasia Myskina	6–2, 6–3
Vienna	(Israel) Anna Smashnova	(Uzbekistan) Iroda Tulyaganova	6–4, 6–1
's-Hertogenbosch	(Greece) Eleni Daniilidou	(Russia) Elena Dementieva	3–6, 6–2, 6–3
Sopot	(Russia) Dinara Safina	(Slovakia) Henrieta Nagyová	6–3, 4–0 ret.
Quebec City	(Russia) Elena Bovina	(Switzerland) Marie-Gayanay Mikaelian	6–3, 6–4
Bali	(Russia) Svetlana Kuznetsova	(Spain) Conchita Martínez	3–6, 7–6^{(7–4)}, 7–5
Tokyo	(United States) Jill Craybas	(Croatia) Silvija Talaja	2–6, 6–4, 6–4
Kockelscheuer	(Belgium) Kim Clijsters	(Bulgaria) Magdalena Maleeva	6–1, 6–2

=== 2003 ===
Tournament	Winner	Runner-up	Score
Gold Coast	(France) Nathalie Dechy	(Switzerland) Marie-Gayanay Mikaelian	6–3, 3–6, 6–3
Doha	(Russia) Anastasia Myskina	(Russia) Elena Likhovtseva	6–3, 6–1
Memphis	(United States) Lisa Raymond	(South Africa) Amanda Coetzer	6–3, 6–2
Bogotá	(Colombia) Fabiola Zuluaga	(Spain) Anabel Medina Garrigues	6–3, 6–2
Acapulco	(South Africa) Amanda Coetzer	(Argentina) Mariana Díaz Oliva	7–5, 6–3
Bol	(Russia) Vera Zvonareva	(Spain) Conchita Martínez Granados	6–1, 6–3
Strasbourg	(Italy) Silvia Farina Elia	(Croatia) Karolina Šprem	6–3, 4–6, 6–4
Madrid	(United States) Chanda Rubin	(Spain) María Sánchez Lorenzo	6–4, 5–7, 6–4
Birmingham	(Bulgaria) Magdalena Maleeva	(Japan) Shinobu Asagoe	6–1, 6–4
Vienna	(Argentina) Paola Suárez	(Croatia) Karolina Šprem	7–6^{(7–0)}, 2–6, 6–4
's-Hertogenbosch	(Belgium) Kim Clijsters	(Belgium) Justine Henin-Hardenne	6–7^{(4–7)}, 3–0 ret.
Sopot	(Israel) Anna Pistolesi	(Czech Republic) Klára Koukalová	6–2, 6–0
Bali	(Russia) Elena Dementieva	(United States) Chanda Rubin	6–2, 6–1
Tokyo	(Russia) Maria Sharapova	(Hungary) Anikó Kapros	2–6, 6–2, 7–6^{(7–5)}
Kockelscheuer	(Belgium) Kim Clijsters	(United States) Chanda Rubin	6–2, 7–5
Quebec City	(Russia) Maria Sharapova	(Venezuela) Milagros Sequera	6–2 ret.

=== 2004 ===
Tournament	Winner	Runner-up	Score
Gold Coast	(Japan) Ai Sugiyama	(Russia) Nadia Petrova	1–6, 6–1, 6–4
Memphis	(Russia) Vera Zvonareva	(United States) Lisa Raymond	4–6, 6–4, 7–5
Bogotá	(Colombia) Fabiola Zuluaga	(Spain) María Sánchez Lorenzo	3–6, 6–4, 6–2
Acapulco	(Czech Republic) Iveta Benešová	(Italy) Flavia Pennetta	7–6^{(7–5)}, 6–4
Strasbourg	(Luxembourg) Claudine Schaul	(United States) Lindsay Davenport	2–6, 6–0, 6–3
Vienna	(Israel) Anna Smashnova-Pistolesi	(Australia) Alicia Molik	6–2, 3–6, 6–2
Birmingham	(Russia) Maria Sharapova	(France) Tatiana Golovin	4–6, 6–2, 6–1
's-Hertogenbosch	(France) Mary Pierce	(Czech Republic) Klára Koukalová	7–6^{(8–6)}, 6–2
Sopot	(Italy) Flavia Pennetta	(Czech Republic) Klára Koukalová	7–5, 3–6, 6–3
Mason	(United States) Lindsay Davenport	(Russia) Vera Zvonareva	6–3, 6–2
Bali	(Russia) Svetlana Kuznetsova	(United States) Marlene Weingärtner	6–1, 6–4
Hasselt	(Russia) Elena Dementieva	(Russia) Elena Bovina	0–6, 6–0, 6–4
Guangzhou	(China) Li Na	(Slovakia) Martina Suchá	6–3, 6–4
Tokyo	(Russia) Maria Sharapova	(United States) Mashona Washington	6–0, 6–1
Kockelscheuer	(Australia) Alicia Molik	(Russia) Dinara Safina	6–3, 6–4
Quebec City	(Slovakia) Martina Suchá	(United States) Abigail Spears	7–5, 3–6, 6–2

=== 2005 ===
Tournament	Winner	Runner-up	Score
Gold Coast	(Switzerland) Patty Schnyder	(Australia) Samantha Stosur	1–6, 6–3, 7–5
Memphis	(Russia) Vera Zvonareva	(United States) Meghann Shaughnessy	7–6^{(7–3)}, 6–2
Bogotá	(Italy) Flavia Pennetta	(Spain) Lourdes Domínguez Lino	7–6^{(7–4)}, 6–4
Acapulco	(Italy) Flavia Pennetta	(Slovakia) Ľudmila Cervanová	3–6, 7–5, 6–3
Istanbul	(United States) Venus Williams	(Czech Republic) Nicole Vaidišová	6–3, 6–2
Strasbourg	(Spain) Anabel Medina Garrigues	(Poland) Marta Domachowska	6–4, 6–3
Birmingham	(Russia) Maria Sharapova	(Serbia and Montenegro) Jelena Janković	6–2, 4–6, 6–1
's-Hertogenbosch	(Czech Republic) Klára Koukalová	(Czech Republic) Lucie Šafářová	3–6, 6–2, 6–2
Mason	(Switzerland) Patty Schnyder	(Japan) Akiko Morigami	6–4, 6–0
Bali	(United States) Lindsay Davenport	(Italy) Francesca Schiavone	6–2, 6–4
Kolkata	(Russia) Anastasia Myskina	(Croatia) Karolina Šprem	6–2, 6–2
Guangzhou	(China) Yan Zi	(Spain) Nuria Llagostera Vives	6–4, 4–0 ret.
Tokyo	(Czech Republic) Nicole Vaidišová	(France) Tatiana Golovin	7–6^{(7–4)}, 3–2 ret.
Bangkok	(Czech Republic) Nicole Vaidišová	(Russia) Nadia Petrova	6–1, 6–7^{(5–7)}, 7–5
Hasselt	(Belgium) Kim Clijsters	(Italy) Francesca Schiavone	6–2, 6–3
Quebec City	(United States) Amy Frazier	(Sweden) Sofia Arvidsson	6–1, 7–5

=== 2006 ===
Tournament	Winner	Runner-up	Score
Gold Coast	(Czech Republic) Lucie Šafářová	(Italy) Flavia Pennetta	6–3, 6–4
Bangalore	(Italy) Mara Santangelo	(Croatia) Jelena Kostanić	3–6, 7–6^{(7–5)}, 6–3
Memphis	(Sweden) Sofia Arvidsson	(Poland) Marta Domachowska	6–2, 2–6, 6–3
Bogotá	(Spain) Lourdes Domínguez Lino	(Italy) Flavia Pennetta	7–6^{(7–3)}, 6–4
Acapulco	(Germany) Anna-Lena Grönefeld	(Italy) Flavia Pennetta	6–1, 4–6, 6–2
Istanbul	(Israel) Shahar Pe'er	(Russia) Anastasia Myskina	1–6, 6–3, 7–6^{(7–3)}
Strasbourg	(Czech Republic) Nicole Vaidišová	(China) Peng Shuai	7–6^{(9–7)}, 6–3
Birmingham	(Russia) Vera Zvonareva	(United States) Jamea Jackson	7–6^{(14–12)}, 7–6^{(7–5)}
's-Hertogenbosch	(Netherlands) Michaëlla Krajicek	(Russia) Dinara Safina	6–3, 6–4
Mason	(Russia) Vera Zvonareva	(Slovenia) Katarina Srebotnik	6–2, 6–4
Bali	(Russia) Svetlana Kuznetsova	(France) Marion Bartoli	7–5, 6–2
Kolkata	(Switzerland) Martina Hingis	(Russia) Olga Puchkova	6–0, 6–4
Guangzhou	(Russia) Anna Chakvetadze	(Spain) Anabel Medina Garrigues	6–1, 6–4
Tokyo	(France) Marion Bartoli	(Japan) Aiko Nakamura	2–6, 6–2, 6–2
Bangkok	(United States) Vania King	(Thailand) Tamarine Tanasugarn	2–6, 6–4, 6–4
Quebec City	(France) Marion Bartoli	(Russia) Olga Puchkova	6–0, 6–0
Hasselt	(Belgium) Kim Clijsters	(Estonia) Kaia Kanepi	6–3, 3–6, 6–4

=== 2007 ===
Tournament	Winner	Runner-up	Score
Gold Coast	(Russia) Dinara Safina	(Switzerland) Martina Hingis	6–3, 3–6, 7–5
Bangalore	(Russia) Yaroslava Shvedova	(Italy) Mara Santangelo	6–4, 6–4
Memphis	(United States) Venus Williams	(Israel) Shahar Pe'er	6–1, 6–1
Bogotá	(Italy) Roberta Vinci	(Italy) Tathiana Garbin	6–7^{(5–7)}, 6–4, 0–3 ret.
Acapulco	(France) Émilie Loit	(Italy) Flavia Pennetta	7–6^{(7–0)}, 6–4
Budapest	(Argentina) Gisela Dulko	(Romania) Sorana Cîrstea	6–7^{(2–7)}, 6–2, 6–2
Istanbul	(Russia) Elena Dementieva	(France) Aravane Rezaï	7–6^{(7–5)}, 3–0 ret.
Strasbourg	(Spain) Anabel Medina Garrigues	(France) Amélie Mauresmo	6–4, 4–6, 6–4
Birmingham	(Serbia) Jelena Janković	(Russia) Maria Sharapova	4–6, 6–3, 7–5
's-Hertogenbosch	(Russia) Anna Chakvetadze	(Serbia) Jelena Janković	7–6^{(7–2)}, 3–6, 6–3
Mason	(Russia) Anna Chakvetadze	(Japan) Akiko Morigami	6–1, 6–3
Bad Gastein	(Italy) Francesca Schiavone	(Austria) Yvonne Meusburger	6–1, 6–4
Bali	(United States) Lindsay Davenport	(Slovakia) Daniela Hantuchová	6–4, 3–6, 6–2
Kolkata	(Russia) Maria Kirilenko	(Ukraine) Mariya Koryttseva	6–0, 6–2
Guangzhou	(France) Virginie Razzano	(Israel) Tzipora Obziler	6–0, 6–3
Tokyo	(France) Virginie Razzano	(United States) Venus Williams	4–6, 7–6^{(9–7)}, 6–4
Bangkok	(Italy) Flavia Pennetta	(Chinese Taipei) Chan Yung-jan	6–1, 6–3
Quebec City	(United States) Lindsay Davenport	(Ukraine) Julia Vakulenko	6–4, 6–1

=== 2008 ===
Tournament	Winner	Runner-up	Score
Gold Coast	(China) Li Na	(Belarus) Victoria Azarenka	4–6, 6–3, 6–4
Viña del Mar	(Italy) Flavia Pennetta	(Czech Republic) Klára Zakopalová	6–4, 5–4 ret.
Bogotá	(Spain) Nuria Llagostera Vives	(Argentina) María Emilia Salerni	6–0, 6–4.
Acapulco	(Italy) Flavia Pennetta	(France) Alizé Cornet	6–0, 4–6, 6–1
Memphis	(United States) Lindsay Davenport	(Belarus) Olga Govortsova	6–2, 6–1
Istanbul	(Poland) Agnieszka Radwańska	(Russia) Elena Dementieva	6–3, 6–2
Strasbourg	(Spain) Anabel Medina Garrigues	(Slovenia) Katarina Srebotnik	4–6, 7–6^{(7–4)}, 6–0
Birmingham	(Ukraine) Kateryna Bondarenko	(Belgium) Yanina Wickmayer	7–6^{(9–7)}, 3–6, 7–6^{(7–4)}
's-Hertogenbosch	(Thailand) Tamarine Tanasugarn	(Russia) Dinara Safina	7–5, 6–3
Budapest	(France) Alizé Cornet	(Slovenia) Andreja Klepač	7–6^{(7–5)}, 6–3
Bad Gastein	(France) Pauline Parmentier	(Czech Republic) Lucie Hradecká	6–4, 6–4
Mason	(Russia) Nadia Petrova	(France) Nathalie Dechy	6–2, 6–1
Bali	(Switzerland) Patty Schnyder	(Austria) Tamira Paszek	6–3, 6–0
Guangzhou	(Russia) Vera Zvonareva	(China) Peng Shuai	6–7^{(4–7)}, 6–0, 6–2
Tokyo	(Denmark) Caroline Wozniacki	(Estonia) Kaia Kanepi	6–2, 3–6, 6–1
Kockelscheuer	(Russia) Elena Dementieva	(Denmark) Caroline Wozniacki	2–6, 6–4, 7–6^{(7–4)}
Quebec City	(Russia) Nadia Petrova	(United States) Bethanie Mattek	4–6, 6–4, 6–1

== Notes ==
^A a Years in the "surface" or "country" columns only refer to the period that the tournament was played on the surface or in that country as a Tier III tournament.
