= Cătălina Cristea =

Romanian tennis player

- Country (sports): Romania
- Born: 2 June 1975 (age 50) Bucharest, Romania
- Turned pro: 1990
- Retired: 2005
- Plays: Right-handed (two–handed backhand)
- Prize money: $663,007

Singles
- Career record: 239–225
- Career titles: 0 WTA, 1 ITF
- Highest ranking: No. 59 (21 July 1997)

Grand Slam singles results
- Australian Open: 2R (1994, 1999)
- French Open: 3R (1995)
- Wimbledon: 2R (2000)
- US Open: 1R (1995, 1997–2000)

Doubles
- Career record: 129–158
- Career titles: 1 WTA, 6 ITF
- Highest ranking: No. 40 (17 August 1998)

Grand Slam doubles results
- Australian Open: 3R (1999)
- French Open: 2R (1998, 1999, 2000)
- Wimbledon: 2R (1997, 2000)
- US Open: 2R (1997, 1999)

Cătălina Cristea (born 2 June 1975) is a former tennis player from Romania. She was ranked No. 59 in singles (21 July 1997) and No. 40 in doubles (17 August 1998). She retired from professional tennis in September 2001, before returning in 2005; she ultimately retired September 2005 aged 30.

Playing for Romania Fed Cup team, Cristea has a win–loss record of 20–13.

== Junior Grand Slam finals ==
=== Doubles (0–1) ===
Result	Year	Championship	Surface	Partner	Opponents	Score
Loss	1993	Australian Open	Hard	(Sweden) Åsa Carlsson	(Switzerland) Joana Manta (Czech Republic) Ludmila Richterová	3–6, 2–6

== WTA career finals ==
=== Doubles: 4 (1–3) ===
Legend
Tier I
Tier II
Tier III (0–2)
Tier IV & V (1–1)

Result	W/L	Date	Tournament	Surface	Partners	Opponents	Score
Loss	0–1	Feb 1998	Oklahoma City, U.S.	Hard (i)	(Australia) Kristine Kunce	(United States) Serena Williams (United States) Venus Williams	5–7, 2–6
Loss	0–2	Apr 1998	Budapest, Hungary	Clay	(Argentina) Laura Montalvo	(Spain) Virginia Ruano Pascual (Argentina) Paola Suárez	6–4, 1–6, 1–6
Loss	0–3	Jun 1998	Rosmalen, Netherlands	Grass	(Czech Republic) Eva Melicharova	(Belgium) Sabine Appelmans (Netherlands) Miriam Oremans	7–6^{(7–4)}, 6–7^{(6–8)}, 6–7^{(5–7)}
Win	1–3	May 1999	Warsaw, Poland	Clay	(Kazakhstan) Irina Selyutina	(France) Amélie Cocheteux (Slovakia) Janette Husárová	6–1, 6–2

== ITF Circuit finals ==
Legend
$100,000 tournaments
$75,000 tournaments
$50,000 tournaments
$25,000 tournaments
$10,000 tournaments

=== Singles (1–3) ===
Result	No.	Date	Tournament	Surface	Opponent	Score
Loss	1.	16 September 1991	Cluj, Romania	Hard	(France) Lea Ghirardi	2–6, 3–6
Win	2.	29 September 1996	Bucharest, Romania	Clay	(Argentina) Mariana Díaz Oliva	7–5, 3–6, 7–6
Loss	3.	15 April 2001	Dinan, France	Clay (i)	(Netherlands) Seda Noorlander	4–6, 2–6
Loss	4.	25 July 2004	Balș, Romania	Clay	(Romania) Simona Matei	1–6, 2–6

=== Doubles (6–1) ===
Result	No.	Date	Tournament	Surface	Partner	Opponents	Score
Win	1.	16 September 1991	Cluj, Romania	Hard	(Romania) Diane Samungi	(Romania) Mirela Buciu (France) Lea Ghirardi	6–1, 6–1
Win	2.	27 July 1992	Lohja, Finland	Clay	(Austria) Andrea Tunko	(Japan) Miyako Ataka (Poland) Monika Starosta	6–2, 7–6^{(4)}
Win	3.	18 July 1994	Bilbao, Spain	Clay	(Netherlands) Hanneke Ketelaars	(Spain) Yolanda Clemot (Spain) Cristina Torrens Valero	6–2, 6–1
Win	4.	20 November 1994	Bad Gögging, Germany	Carpet (i)	(Serbia and Montenegro) Tatjana Ječmenica	(Czech Republic) Kateřina Kroupová (Czech Republic) Jana Pospíšilová	3–6, 6–3, 6–2
Win	5.	25 August 1996	Athens, Greece	Clay	(Czech Republic) Helena Vildová	(France) Virginie Massart (Switzerland) Emanuela Zardo	6–2, 6–4
Win	6.	12 October 1997	Sedona, United States	Hard	(United States) Corina Morariu	(United States) Liezel Huber (Argentina) Paola Suárez	7–5, 6–2
Loss	7.	9 October 1999	Batumi, Georgia	Carpet	(South Africa) Surina De Beer	(Romania) Magda Mihalache (Slovakia) Zuzana Váleková	4–6, 6–3, 4–6

== Head-to-head record ==
Players who have been ranked world No. 1 are in boldface.

- Lindsay Davenport 0–2
- Mary Pierce 0–3
- Conchita Martínez 0–1
- Natasha Zvereva 1–0
- Jana Novotná 0–1
- Elena Likhovtseva 0–4
- Alexandra Fusai 0–2
- Nathalie Tauziat 0–1
- Corina Morariu 1–2
- Lisa Raymond 0–1
- **Karina Habšudová** 1–1
- Ai Sugiyama 1–2
- Amélie Mauresmo 1–0
- Nadia Petrova 1–0
