= Olga Lugina =

Ukrainian tennis player

- Country (sports): Ukraine
- Born: 8 January 1974 (age 52)
- Height: 173 cm (5 ft 8 in)
- Turned pro: 1989
- Retired: 1999
- Plays: Right (two-handed backhand)
- Prize money: $285,179

Singles
- Career record: 156–130
- Career titles: 0 WTA, 1 ITF
- Highest ranking: No. 96 (27 April 1998)

Grand Slam singles results
- Australian Open: 1R (1998)
- French Open: 1R (1998)
- Wimbledon: 1R (1998)
- US Open: 1R (1997)

Doubles
- Career record: 129–111
- Career titles: 2 WTA, 10 ITF
- Highest ranking: No. 45 (31 October 1994)

Grand Slam doubles results
- Australian Open: 2R (1995)
- French Open: 3R (1996)
- Wimbledon: 2R (1994, 1997)
- US Open: 2R (1998)

Olga Lugina (born 8 January 1974) is a Ukrainian former professional tennis player. She competed in the Fed Cup a number of times, from 1993 to 1995.

== Career ==
Lugina won two doubles titles on the WTA Tour. She also won one singles title and ten doubles titles on the ITF Circuit in her career. On 27 April 1998, she reached her best singles ranking of world No. 96. On 31 October 1994, she peaked at No. 45 in the doubles rankings.

Lugina retired from the pro tour in 1999.

== WTA Tour finals ==
=== Doubles: 3 (2 titles, 1 runner-up) ===
Legend
Tier III (2–0)
Tier IV (0–1)
Tier V (0–0)

Result	Date	Tournament	Surface	Partner	Opponents	Score
Win	Sep 1996	Warsaw Open, Poland	Clay	(Bulgaria) Elena Pampoulova	(France) Alexandra Fusai (Italy) Laura Garrone	1–6, 6–4, 7–5
Win	Jul 1998	Warsaw Open, Poland	Clay	(Slovakia) Karina Habšudová	(South Africa) Liezel Horn (Austria) Karin Kschwendt	7–6, 7–5
Loss	Jul 1999	Pörtschach, Austria	Clay	(Argentina) Laura Montalvo	(Italy) Silvia Farina (Slovakia) Karina Habšudová	4–6, 4–6

== ITF Circuit finals ==
Legend
$100,000 tournaments
$75,000 tournaments
$50,000 tournaments
$25,000 tournaments
$10,000 tournaments

=== Singles (1–4) ===
Result	No.	Date	Tournament	Surface	Opponent	Score
Loss	1.	17 September 1990	Supetar, Yugoslavia	Clay	(Socialist Federal Republic of Yugoslavia) Ivona Horvat	1–6, 5–7
Win	2.	25 August 1991	Koksijde, Belgium	Clay	(Netherlands) Amy van Buuren	6–4, 5–7, 6–1
Loss	3.	1 February 1992	Danderyd, Sweden	Carpet (i)	(Czech Republic) Jindra Gabrisová	4–6, 6–7
Loss	4.	17 August 1992	Koksijde, Belgium	Clay	(Belgium) Laurence Courtois	3–6, 6–3, 3–6
Loss	5.	23 October 1995	Lakeland, United States	Hard	(United States) Sandra Cacic	5–7, 3–6

=== Doubles (10–7) ===
Result	No.	Date	Tournament	Surface	Partner	Opponents	Score
Win	1.	29 July 1991	A Coruña, Spain	Clay	(Israel) Nelly Barkan	(Netherlands) Hanneke Ketelaars (Greece) Christina Zachariadou	7–6^{(4)}, 6–3
Loss	2.	25 August 1991	Koksijde, Belgium	Clay	(Israel) Nelly Barkan	(Belgium) Laurence Courtois (Belgium) Nancy Feber	6–4, 0–6, 4–6
Win	3.	14 October 1991	Burgdorf, Switzerland	Carpet (i)	(Israel) Nelly Barkan	(Switzerland) Michèle Strebel (Switzerland) Natalie Tschan	6–4, 1–6, 6–4
Loss	4.	19 January 1992	Bamberg, Germany	Carpet (i)	(Czech Republic) Markéta Štusková	(Commonwealth of Independent States) Elena Likhovtseva (Netherlands) Dorien Wamelink	6–4, 1–6, 2–6
Loss	5.	1 February 1992	Danderyd, Sweden	Carpet (i)	(Belgium) Katrien de Craemer	(Belgium) Laurence Courtois (Belgium) Nancy Feber	6–7^{(0)}, 3–6
Win	6.	25 May 1992	Putignano, Italy	Hard	(Commonwealth of Independent States) Elena Makarova	(Commonwealth of Independent States) Aida Khalatian (Commonwealth of Independent States) Karina Kuregian	6–2, 6–4
Loss	7.	24 March 1993	Reims, France	Clay	(Moldova) Svetlana Komleva	(Italy) Marzia Grossi (Italy) Rita Grande	4–6, 4–6
Win	8.	9 August 1993	Rebecq, Belgium	Clay	(Israel) Nelly Barkan	(Argentina) Mariana Diaz-Oliva (Argentina) Valentina Solari	6–1, 7–6^{(7–1)}
Win	9.	6 September 1993	Spoleto, Italy	Clay	(Paraguay) Larissa Schaerer	(Italy) Susanna Attili (Italy) Elena Savoldi	7–5, 7–6^{(5)}
Win	10.	31 October 1993	Poitiers, France	Hard (i)	(Germany) Elena Wagner	(Belgium) Els Callens (Belgium) Nancy Feber	6–4, 3–6, 6–3
Loss	11.	29 November 1993	Ramat HaSharon, Israel	Hard	(Germany) Angela Kerek	(Russia) Natalia Egorova (Russia) Svetlana Parkhomenko	2–6, 3–6
Loss	12.	4 March 1996	Prostějov, Czech Republic	Hard (i)	(Bulgaria) Svetlana Krivencheva	(Czech Republic) Denisa Chládková (Czech Republic) Helena Vildová	6–7^{(5–7)}, 6–4, 5–7
Win	13.	14 July 1996	Istanbul, Turkey	Hard	(Slovenia) Tina Križan	(Italy) Laura Garrone (Italy) Flora Perfetti	6–4, 6–2
Win	14.	24 February 1997	Bushey, United Kingdom	Carpet (i)	(United Kingdom) Clare Wood	(Germany) Kirstin Freye (Ukraine) Elena Tatarkova	7–6^{(6)}, 6–7^{(6)}, 6–1
Win	15.	28 July 1997	Makarska, Croatia	Clay	(Germany) Elena Wagner	(Russia) Maria Goloviznina (Russia) Evgenia Kulikovskaya	5–7, 7–5, 7–5
Loss	16.	26 April 1998	Prostějov, Czech Republic	Clay	(Germany) Elena Wagner	(Czech Republic) Lenka Cenková (Czech Republic) Kateřina Šišková	4–6, 6–4, 4–6
Win	17.	1 November 1998	Poitiers, France	Hard (i)	(Russia) Elena Makarova	(Germany) Gabriela Kučerová (Czech Republic) Radka Pelikánová	6–0, 6–1
