= Warsaw Open =

Coordinates: 52.2200°N 21.0375°E

Polsat Warsaw Open

Defunct tennis tournament
- Founded: 1995
- Abolished: 2010
- Editions: 14
- Location: Warsaw; Poland
- Venue: Warszawianka Courts; Legia Tennis Centre
- Category: Premier
- Surface: Clay / outdoors
- Draw: 32M / 16D
- Prize money: $600,000
- Website: www.pwo.polsat.pl

The Warsaw Open, formerly the J&S Cup, was a women's tennis tournament on the WTA Tour held in Warsaw, Poland. Held since 1995, the tournament was played on outdoor clay courts. The event returned for two years to the WTA Tour in 2009 after a year's hiatus but its slot on the tour calendar was taken over by the Brussels Open from 2011.

== Past finals ==
=== Singles ===
Year	Tournament name	Tier	Champion	Runner-up	Score
1995	Warsaw Cup by Heros	Tier III	(Austria) Barbara Paulus	(France) Alexandra Fusai	7–6, 4–6, 6–1
1996	Warsaw Cup	Tier III	(Slovakia) Henrieta Nagyová	(Austria) Barbara Paulus	3–6, 6–2, 6–1
1997	Warsaw Cup by Heros	Tier III	(Austria) Barbara Paulus (2)	(Slovakia) Henrieta Nagyová	6–4, 6–4
1998	Warsaw Cup by Heros	Tier III	(Spain) Conchita Martínez	(Italy) Silvia Farina Elia	6–0, 6–3
1999	Warsaw Cup by Heros	Tier IV	(Spain) Cristina Torrens Valero	(Argentina) Inés Gorrochategui	7–5, 7–6^{(3)}
2000	Warsaw Cup by Heros	Tier IV	(Slovakia) Henrieta Nagyová (2)	(Netherlands) Amanda Hopmans	2–6, 6–4, 7–5
2001	Not held				
2002	J&S Cup	Tier III	(Russia) Elena Bovina	(Slovakia) Henrieta Nagyová	6–3, 6–1
2003	J&S Cup	Tier II	(France) Amélie Mauresmo	(United States) Venus Williams	6–7, 6–0, 3–0 ret.
2004	J&S Cup	Tier II	(United States) Venus Williams	(Russia) Svetlana Kuznetsova	6–1, 6–4
2005	J&S Cup	Tier II	(Belgium) Justine Henin-Hardenne	(Russia) Svetlana Kuznetsova	3–6, 6–2, 7–5
2006	J&S Cup	Tier II	(Belgium) Kim Clijsters	(Russia) Svetlana Kuznetsova	7–5, 6–2
2007	J&S Cup	Tier II	(Belgium) Justine Henin (2)	(Ukraine) Alona Bondarenko	6–1, 6–3
2008	Not held				
2009	Warsaw Open	Premier	(Romania) Alexandra Dulgheru	(Ukraine) Alona Bondarenko	7–6^{3}, 3–6, 6–0
2010	Polsat Warsaw Open	Premier	(Romania) Alexandra Dulgheru (2)	(China) Zheng Jie	6–3, 6–4
2011	replaced by Brussels Open				

=== Doubles ===
Year	Tournament name	Tier	Champion	Runner-up	Score
1995	Warsaw Cup by Heros	Tier III	(Italy) Sandra Cecchini (Italy) Laura Garrone	(Slovakia) Henrieta Nagyová (Slovakia) Denisa Krajčovičová	5–7, 6–2, 6–3
1996	Warsaw Cup	Tier III	(Ukraine) Olga Lugina (Germany) Elena Wagner	(France) Alexandra Fusai (Italy) Laura Garrone	1–6, 6–4, 7–5
1997	Warsaw Cup by Heros	Tier III	(Romania) Ruxandra Dragomir (Argentina) Inés Gorrochategui	(Germany) Meike Babel (Australia) Catherine Barclay-Reitz	6–4, 6–0
1998	Warsaw Cup by Heros	Tier III	(Ukraine) Olga Lugina (2) (Slovakia) Karina Habšudová	(South Africa) Liezel Huber (Austria) Karin Kschwendt	7–6, 7–5
1999	Warsaw Cup by Heros	Tier IV	(Romania) Cătălina Cristea (Kazakhstan) Irina Selyutina	(France) Amélie Cocheteux (Slovakia) Janette Husárová	6–1, 6–2
2000	Warsaw Cup by Heros	Tier IV	(Italy) Tathiana Garbin (Slovakia) Janette Husárová	(Uzbekistan) Iroda Tulyaganova (Ukraine) Anna Zaporozhanova	6–3, 6–1
2001	Not held				
2002	J&S Cup	Tier III	(Croatia) Jelena Kostanić (Slovakia) Henrieta Nagyová	(Russia) Evgenia Kulikovskaya (Croatia) Silvija Talaja	6–1, 6–1
2003	J&S Cup	Tier II	(South Africa) Liezel Huber (Bulgaria) Magdalena Maleeva	(Greece) Eleni Daniilidou (Italy) Francesca Schiavone	3–6, 6–4, 6–2
2004	J&S Cup	Tier II	(Italy) Silvia Farina Elia (Italy) Francesca Schiavone	(Argentina) Gisela Dulko (Argentina) Patricia Tarabini	3–6, 6–2, 6–1
2005	J&S Cup	Tier II	(Ukraine) Tatiana Perebiynis (Czech Republic) Barbora Strýcová	(Poland) Klaudia Jans (Poland) Alicja Rosolska	6–1, 6–4
2006	J&S Cup	Tier II	(Russia) Elena Likhovtseva (Russia) Anastasia Myskina	(Spain) Anabel Medina (Slovenia) Katarina Srebotnik	6–3, 6–4
2007	J&S Cup	Tier II	(Russia) Vera Dushevina (Ukraine) Tatiana Perebiynis (2)	(Russia) Elena Likhovtseva (Russia) Elena Vesnina	7–5, 3–6, [10–2]
2008	Not held				
2009	Warsaw Open	Premier	(United States) Raquel Kops-Jones (United States) Bethanie Mattek-Sands	(China) Yan Zi (China) Zheng Jie	6–1, 6–1
2010	Polsat Warsaw Open	Premier	(Spain) Virginia Ruano Pascual (United States) Meghann Shaughnessy	(Zimbabwe) Cara Black (China) Yan Zi	6–3, 6–4
2011	replaced by Brussels Open				

== See also ==
- List of tennis tournaments
