= 1996 Meta Styrian Open – Doubles =

Doubles
- 1996 Meta Styrian Open
- 1995 Champions: (Italy) Silvia Farina (Hungary) Andrea Temesvári

Final
- Champions: (Slovakia) Janette Husárová (Ukraine) Natalia Medvedeva
- Runners-up: (Czech Republic) Lenka Cenková (Czech Republic) Kateřina Šišková
- Score: 6–4, 7–5

Details
- Draw: 16
- Seeds: 4

Events
Singles	Doubles
← 1995 ·	Meta Styrian Open	· 1997 →

Silvia Farina and Andrea Temesvári were the defending champions but did not compete that year.

Janette Husárová and Natalia Medvedeva won in the final 6–4, 7–5 against Lenka Cenková and Kateřina Šišková.

== Seeds ==
Champion seeds are indicated in bold text while text in italics indicates the round in which those seeds were eliminated.

1. (Germany) Wiltrud Probst / (Bulgaria) Elena Pampoulova (quarterfinals)
2. (Italy) Sandra Cecchini / (Italy) Laura Garrone (semifinals)
3. (Czech Republic) Radka Bobková / (Czech Republic) Eva Melicharová (semifinals)
4. (Romania) Cătălina Cristea / (Italy) Flora Perfetti (first round)

== Draw ==
=== Key ===
- Q = Qualifier
- WC = Wild card
- LL = Lucky loser
- Alt = Alternate
- SE = Special exempt
- PR = Protected ranking
- ITF = ITF entry
- JE = Junior exempt
- w/o = Walkover
- r = Retired
- d = Defaulted
- SR = Special ranking

First round
1	(Germany) **W Probst** (Bulgaria) **E Pampoulova**	6	**6**	**6**
(Germany) A Barna (Austria) E Habeler	**7**	0	2
(Austria) M Maruska (Austria) B Schwartz	**6**	2	2
(Czech Republic) **L Cenková** (Czech Republic) **K Šišková**	2	**6**	**6**
3	(Czech Republic) **R Bobková** (Czech Republic) **E Melicharová**	**6**	**6**
(Austria) S Dopfer (Austria) M Schnell	1	3
(Germany) **A Glass** (Germany) **V Martinek**	**7**	**6**
(Spain) Á Montolio (Spain) M Sánchez Lorenzo	6	2
(Slovakia) **J Husárová** (Ukraine) **N Medvedeva**	**6**	**6**
(Hungary) K Miskolczi (Austria) N Murn	0	2
(Argentina) **B Fulco-Villella** (Spain) **C Torrens Valero**	**6**	**6**
4	(Romania) C Cristea (Italy) F Perfetti	2	0
(Austria) S Moser (Austria) N Ninaus	1	2
(Italy) **A Canepa** (Belgium) **S Devillé**	**6**	**6**
(Israel) A Smashnova (Germany) M Zivec-Skulj	2	2
2	(Italy) **S Cecchini** (Italy) **L Garrone**	**6**	**6**

Quarterfinals
1	(Germany) W Probst (Bulgaria) E Pampoulova	**6**	3	2
(Czech Republic) **L Cenková** (Czech Republic) **K Šišková**	3	**6**	**6**
3	(Czech Republic) **R Bobková** (Czech Republic) **E Melicharová**	**6**	**7**
(Germany) A Glass (Germany) V Martinek	2	6
(Slovakia) **J Husárová** (Ukraine) **N Medvedeva**	**6**	**6**
(Argentina) B Fulco-Villella (Spain) C Torrens Valero	4	2
(Italy) A Canepa (Belgium) S Devillé	3	2
2	(Italy) **S Cecchini** (Italy) **L Garrone**	**6**	**6**

Semifinals
(Czech Republic) **L Cenková** (Czech Republic) **K Šišková**	**6**	3	**7**
3	(Czech Republic) R Bobková (Czech Republic) E Melicharová	4	**6**	6
(Slovakia) **J Husárová** (Ukraine) **N Medvedeva**	5	**6**	**6**
2	(Italy) S Cecchini (Italy) L Garrone	**7**	4	3

Final
(Czech Republic) Lenka Cenková (Czech Republic) Kateřina Šišková	4	5
(Slovakia) **Janette Husárová** (Ukraine) **Natalia Medvedeva**	**6**	**7**
