= 1998 Prokom Polish Open =

- Date: 27 July – 2 August
- Edition: 1st
- Category: Tier IV
- Draw: 32S / 16D
- Prize money: $107,500
- Surface: Clay / outdoor
- Location: Sopot, Poland

Champions

Singles
- (Slovakia) Henrieta Nagyová

Doubles
- (Czech Republic) Květa Hrdličková / (Czech Republic) Helena Vildová
Prokom Polish Open	· 1999 →

The 1998 Prokom Polish Open was a women's tennis tournament played on outdoor clay courts in Sopot, Poland that was part of the Tier IV category of the 1998 WTA Tour. It was the inaugural edition of the tournament and was held from 27 July until 2 August 1998. First-seeded Henrieta Nagyová won the singles title and earned $17,700 first-prize money.

== Finals ==
=== Singles ===
(Slovakia) Henrieta Nagyová defeated (Germany) Elena Wagner 6–3, 5–7, 6–1

- It was Nagyová's 1st title of the year and the 4th of her career.

=== Doubles ===
(Czech Republic) Květa Hrdličková / (Czech Republic) Helena Vildová defeated (Sweden) Åsa Carlsson / (Netherlands) Seda Noorlander 6–3, 6–2

- It was Hrdličková's 2nd title of the year and the 2nd of her career. It was Vildova's only title of the year and the 3rd of her career.
