= 1995 Styrian Open – Singles =

1995 Austrian tennis singles tournament

Singles
- 1995 Styrian Open
- 1994 Champion: (Germany) Anke Huber

Final
- Champion: (Austria) Judith Wiesner
- Runner-up: (Romania) Ruxandra Dragomir
- Score: 7–6, 6–3

Details
- Draw: 32
- Seeds: 8

Events
Singles	Doubles
← 1994 ·	Styrian Open	· 1996 →

Anke Huber was the defending champion but did not compete that year.

Judith Wiesner won in the final 7–6, 6–3 against Ruxandra Dragomir.

== Seeds ==
A champion seed is indicated in bold text while text in italics indicates the round in which that seed was eliminated.

1. (Austria) **Judith Wiesner (champion)**
2. n/a
3. (Italy) Silvia Farina (quarterfinals)
4. (Italy) Sandra Cecchini (quarterfinals)
5. (Romania) Ruxandra Dragomir (final)
6. (Spain) Virginia Ruano Pascual (second round)
7. (Germany) Veronika Martinek (first round)
8. (Hungary) Andrea Temesvári (first round)
9. (Germany) Jana Kandarr (first round)

== Draw ==
=== Key ===
- Q = Qualifier
- WC = Wild card
- LL = Lucky loser
- Alt = Alternate
- SE = Special exempt
- PR = Protected ranking
- ITF = ITF entry
- JE = Junior exempt
- w/o = Walkover
- r = Retired
- d = Defaulted
- SR = Special ranking

First round
1	(Austria) **J Wiesner**	**6**	**6**
(Slovakia) K Studeníková	1	1
(Slovenia) T Križan	3	1
(Germany) **K Kschwendt**	**6**	**6**
(Spain) **Á Montolio**	**7**	**6**
WC	(Austria) M Schnell	5	3
WC	(Austria) S Reichel	1	0
6	(Spain) **V Ruano-Pascual**	**6**	**6**
3	(Italy) **S Farina**	**6**	**6**
Q	(Hungary) V Csurgo	3	3
(Czech Republic) R Bobková	4	**6**	3
LL	(Argentina) **B Fulco-Villella**	**6**	4	**6**
(Federal Republic of Yugoslavia) **T Ječmenica**	**6**	3	**6**
Q	(Croatia) N Ercegović	4	**6**	3
(Germany) **S Meier**	**7**	2	**6**
8	(Hungary) A Temesvári	5	**6**	2
5	(Romania) **R Dragomir**	**7**	**6**
(Austria) S Dopfer	5	3
(Austria) B Schett	**6**	3	4
(Austria) **P Schwarz**	3	**6**	**6**
WC	(Germany) **M Weingärtner**	**6**	**6**
(Italy) F Perfetti	3	3
LL	(Czech Republic) A Vašková	**6**	3	4
4	(Italy) **S Cecchini**	4	**6**	**6**
7	(Germany) V Martinek	2	0
Q	(Italy) **L Garrone**	**6**	**6**
Q	(Croatia) S Talaja	1	3
(Austria) **B Paulus**	**6**	**6**
(Germany) W Probst	6	2
(Spain) **S Ramón-Cortés**	**7**	**6**
(Czech Republic) **L Richterová**	**6**	**6**
9	(Germany) J Kandarr	1	2

Second round
1	(Austria) **J Wiesner**	**6**	5	**6**
(Germany) K Kschwendt	3	**7**	1
(Spain) **Á Montolio**	**6**	1	**6**
6	(Spain) V Ruano-Pascual	2	**6**	3
3	(Italy) **S Farina**	**6**	**6**
LL	(Argentina) B Fulco-Villella	1	3
(Federal Republic of Yugoslavia) **T Ječmenica**	**6**	4	**6**
(Germany) S Meier	4	**6**	1
5	(Romania) **R Dragomir**	**6**	**6**
(Austria) P Schwarz	3	4
WC	(Germany) M Weingärtner	**6**	2	2
4	(Italy) **S Cecchini**	2	**6**	**6**
Q	(Italy) L Garrone	3	2
(Austria) **B Paulus**	**6**	**6**
(Spain) **S Ramón-Cortés**	**7**	**6**
(Czech Republic) L Richterová	6	3

Quarterfinals
1	(Austria) **J Wiesner**	4	**6**	**7**
(Spain) Á Montolio	**6**	2	6
3	(Italy) S Farina	2	2
(Federal Republic of Yugoslavia) **T Ječmenica**	**6**	**6**
5	(Romania) **R Dragomir**	**6**	**6**
4	(Italy) S Cecchini	1	2
(Austria) **B Paulus**	**6**	**6**
(Spain) S Ramón-Cortés	1	4

Semifinals
1	(Austria) **J Wiesner**	5	**6**	**6**
(Federal Republic of Yugoslavia) T Ječmenica	**7**	1	0
5	(Romania) **R Dragomir**	**6**	**6**
(Austria) B Paulus	0	3

Final
1	(Austria) **Judith Wiesner**	**7**	**6**
5	(Romania) Ruxandra Dragomir	6	3
