= 1997 Meta Styrian Open – Singles =

Singles
- 1997 Meta Styrian Open
- 1996 Champion: (Austria) Barbara Paulus

Final
- Champion: (Austria) Barbara Schett
- Runner-up: (Slovakia) Henrieta Nagyová
- Score: 3–6, 6–2, 6–3

Details
- Draw: 32
- Seeds: 8

Events
Singles	Doubles
← 1996 ·	Meta Styrian Open	· 1998 →

Barbara Paulus was the defending champion but lost in the quarterfinals to María Sánchez Lorenzo.

Barbara Schett won in the final 3–6, 6–2, 6–3 against Henrieta Nagyová.

== Seeds ==
A champion seed is indicated in bold text while text in italics indicates the round in which that seed was eliminated.

1. (Austria) Barbara Paulus (quarterfinals)
2. (Slovakia) Karina Habšudová (first round)
3. (Austria) Judith Wiesner (quarterfinals)
4. (Switzerland) Patty Schnyder (quarterfinals)
5. (Austria) **Barbara Schett (champion)**
6. (Slovakia) Henrieta Nagyová (final)
7. (Czech Republic) Denisa Chládková (second round)
8. (Spain) Virginia Ruano Pascual (second round)

== Draw ==
=== Key ===
- Q = Qualifier
- WC = Wild card
- LL = Lucky loser
- Alt = Alternate
- SE = Special exempt
- PR = Protected ranking
- ITF = ITF entry
- JE = Junior exempt
- w/o = Walkover
- r = Retired
- d = Defaulted
- SR = Special ranking

First round
1	(Austria) **B Paulus**	**6**	3	**6**
Q	(Georgia (country)) N Louarsabishvili	2	**6**	1
(Czech Republic) P Langrová	3	3
Q	(Italy) **L Garrone**	**6**	**6**
(Spain) **M Sánchez Lorenzo**	**7**	**6**
(Germany) J Kandarr	5	0
(Italy) F Perfetti	4	2
8	(Spain) **V Ruano-Pascual**	**6**	**6**
3	(Austria) **J Wiesner**	**6**	**6**
(Belgium) S Devillé	2	2
WC	(Austria) P Schwarz	5	5
(France) **A Cocheteux**	**7**	**7**
(Spain) **C Torrens Valero**	**6**	**6**
(Italy) S Cecchini	2	2
WC	(Austria) E Fauth	3	2
5	(Austria) **B Schett**	**6**	**6**
6	(Slovakia) **H Nagyová**	3	**6**	**3**
(Germany) P Begerow	**6**	4	2/r
(Slovakia) K Studeníková	2	2
(Argentina) **I Gorrochategui**	**6**	**6**
(Czech Republic) A Gerši	**6**	4	5
LL	(Poland) **M Grzybowska**	3	**6**	**7**
(Czech Republic) S Kleinová	5	3
4	(Switzerland) **P Schnyder**	**7**	**6**
7	(Czech Republic) **D Chládková**	**6**	**6**
(Austria) M Maruska	0	4
Q	(Portugal) S Prazeres	3	4
Q	(Spain) **G León García**	**6**	**6**
(Austria) K Kschwendt	4	0
(Germany) **M Babel**	**6**	**6**
(South Africa) **J Kruger**	6	**6**	**6**
2	(Slovakia) K Habšudová	**7**	4	3

Second round
1	(Austria) **B Paulus**	**6**	**6**
Q	(Italy) L Garrone	3	4
(Spain) **M Sánchez Lorenzo**	**7**	3	**6**
8	(Spain) V Ruano-Pascual	6	**6**	2
3	(Austria) **J Wiesner**	**6**	**6**
(France) A Cocheteux	3	0
(Spain) C Torrens Valero
5	(Austria) **B Schett**	**w/o**
6	(Slovakia) **H Nagyová**	**7**	**6**
(Argentina) I Gorrochategui	5	4
LL	(Poland) M Grzybowska	1	0	r
4	(Switzerland) **P Schnyder**	**6**	**2**
7	(Czech Republic) D Chládková	0	3
(Spain) **G León García**	**6**	**6**
(Germany) **M Babel**	**6**	**6**
(South Africa) J Kruger	4	1

Quarterfinals
1	(Austria) B Paulus
(Spain) **M Sánchez Lorenzo**	**w/o**
3	(Austria) J Wiesner	**6**	5	0
5	(Austria) **B Schett**	3	**7**	**6**
6	(Slovakia) **H Nagyová**	0	**6**	**6**
4	(Switzerland) P Schnyder	**6**	4	2
(Spain) G León García	3	1
(Germany) **M Babel**	**6**	**6**

Semifinals
(Spain) M Sánchez Lorenzo	4	1
5	(Austria) **B Schett**	**6**	**6**
6	(Slovakia) **H Nagyová**	**6**	**7**
(Germany) M Babel	1	6

Final
5	(Austria) **Barbara Schett**	3	**6**	**6**
6	(Slovakia) Henrieta Nagyová	**6**	2	3
