= 2002 Proximus Diamond Games – Doubles =

Doubles
- 2002 Proximus Diamond Games

Final
- Champions: (Bulgaria) Magdalena Maleeva (Switzerland) Patty Schnyder
- Runners-up: (France) Nathalie Dechy (United States) Meilen Tu
- Score: 6–3, 6–7^{(3–7)}, 6–3

Details
- Draw: 15
- Seeds: 4

Events
Singles	Doubles
Diamond Games	· 2003 →

In the inaugural edition of the tournament, Magdalena Maleeva and Patty Schnyder won the title by defeating Nathalie Dechy and Meilen Tu 6–3, 6–7^{(3–7)}, 6–3 in the final.

== Seeds ==
1. (Federal Republic of Yugoslavia) ~~Jelena Dokic~~ / (Slovakia) ~~Daniela Hantuchová~~ (withdrew die to a right adductor strain on Dokic)
2. (Belgium) Els Callens / (Netherlands) Miriam Oremans (semifinals)
3. (France) Nathalie Dechy / (United States) Meilen Tu (final)
4. (Czech Republic) Dája Bedáňová / (Russia) Elena Bovina (semifinals)
5. (Bulgaria) Magdalena Maleeva / (Switzerland) Patty Schnyder (champions)

== Draw ==
Key

- Q = Qualifier
- WC = Wild card
- LL = Lucky loser
- Alt = Alternate
- ITF = ITF entry
- PR = Protected ranking
- SR = Special ranking
- SE = Special exempt
- JE = Junior exempt
- JR = Junior Accelerator Programme entrant
- CO = College Accelerator Programme entrant
- NG = Next Gen Accelerator Program entrant
- w/o = Walkover
- r = Retired
- d = Defaulted

=== Draw ===
First round
3	(France) N Dechy (United States) M Tu	6	6
(Germany) G Arn (Germany) A Barna	1	1
(France) C Dhenin (Paraguay) R de los Ríos	6	2	7^{10}
(Spain) M Marrero (France) V Razzano	4	6	6^{8}
4	(Czech Republic) D Bedáňová (Russia) E Bovina	7	6
(Belgium) L Butkiewicz (Belgium) P Van Acker	5	2
(France) S Foretz (Luxembourg) A Kremer	7	6
(Denmark) E Dyrberg (Croatia) M Palaveršić	5	3
(Germany) K Freye (Netherlands) S Noorlander	5	6	6
WC	(Belgium) K Flipkens (Belgium) C Maes	7	4	4
(United States) L Osterloh (Germany) M Weingärtner	4	4
5	(Bulgaria) M Maleeva (Switzerland) P Schnyder	6	6
(South Africa) J Kruger (Italy) F Schiavone
2	(Belgium) E Callens (Netherlands) M Oremans	w/o

Quarterfinals
3	(France) N Dechy (United States) M Tu	7	6
(France) C Dhenin (Paraguay) R de los Ríos	5	1
4	(Czech Republic) D Bedáňová (Russia) E Bovina	7	6^{3}	6
(France) S Foretz (Luxembourg) A Kremer	5	7^{7}	3
(Germany) K Freye (Netherlands) S Noorlander	2	1
5	(Bulgaria) M Maleeva (Switzerland) P Schnyder	6	6
(Belgium) E Clijsters (Belgium) L Courtois	3	4
2	(Belgium) E Callens (Netherlands) M Oremans	6	6

Semifinals
3	(France) N Dechy (United States) M Tu	7^{7}	6
4	(Czech Republic) D Bedáňová (Russia) E Bovina	6^{2}	3
5	(Bulgaria) M Maleeva (Switzerland) P Schnyder	6	6
2	(Belgium) E Callens (Netherlands) M Oremans	4	1

Final
3	(France) N Dechy (United States) M Tu	3	7^{7}	3
5	(Bulgaria) M Maleeva (Switzerland) P Schnyder	6	6^{3}	6
