= 1997 Meta Styrian Open – Doubles =

Doubles
- 1997 Meta Styrian Open
- 1996 Champions: (Slovakia) Janette Husárová; (Ukraine) Natalia Medvedeva

Final
- Champions: (Czech Republic) Eva Melicharová; (Czech Republic) Helena Vildová
- Runners-up: (Czech Republic) Radka Bobková; (Germany) Wiltrud Probst
- Score: 6–2, 6–2

Details
- Draw: 16
- Seeds: 4

Events
Singles	Doubles
← 1996 ·	Meta Styrian Open	· 1998 →

Janette Husárová and Natalia Medvedeva were the defending champions but did not compete that year.

Eva Melicharová and Helena Vildová won in the final 6–2, 6–2 against Radka Bobková and Wiltrud Probst.

== Seeds ==
Champion seeds are indicated in bold text while text in italics indicates the round in which those seeds were eliminated.

1. (Austria) Barbara Schett / (Switzerland) Patty Schnyder (semifinals)
2. (Czech Republic) **Eva Melicharová** / (Czech Republic) **Helena Vildová (champions)**
3. (Italy) Laura Garrone / (Italy) Gloria Pizzichini (quarterfinals)
4. (Australia) Catherine Barclay / (Poland) Magdalena Grzybowska (quarterfinals)

== Draw ==
=== Key ===
- Q = Qualifier
- WC = Wild card
- LL = Lucky loser
- Alt = Alternate
- SE = Special exempt
- PR = Protected ranking
- ITF = ITF entry
- JE = Junior exempt
- w/o = Walkover
- r = Retired
- d = Defaulted
- SR = Special ranking

First round

Quarterfinals

Semifinals

Final

1
- (Austria) **B Schett**
- (Switzerland) **P Schnyder**
**6**
**6**

- (Czech Republic) K Kroupová
- (Germany) V Martinek
0
4

1
- (Austria) **B Schett**
- (Switzerland) **P Schnyder**
**6**
**6**

- (Hungary) **K Marosi**
- (Italy) **A Serra Zanetti**
**6**
**7**

- (Hungary) K Marosi
- (Italy) A Serra Zanetti
0
1

Q
- (Czech Republic) S Kleinová
- (Argentina) L Masante
2
6

1
- (Austria) B Schett
- (Switzerland) P Schnyder

3
- (Italy) **L Garrone**
- (Italy) **G Pizzichini**
**6**
**6**

- (Czech Republic) **R Bobková**
- (Germany) **W Probst**
**w/o**

- (Hungary) V Csurgo
- (Germany) C Schneider
1
4

3
- (Italy) L Garrone
- (Italy) G Pizzichini
1
6

- (Germany) M Babel
- (Slovakia) H Nagyová
0
3

- (Czech Republic) **R Bobková**
- (Germany) **W Probst**
**6**
**7**

- (Czech Republic) **R Bobková**
- (Germany) **W Probst**
**6**
**6**

- (Czech Republic) Radka Bobková
- (Germany) Wiltrud Probst
2
2

- (Czech Republic) **P Langrová**
- (Slovakia) **R Zrubáková**
**6**
**7**

2
- (Czech Republic) **Eva Melicharová**
- (Czech Republic) **Helena Vildová**
**6**
**6**

- (Germany) Adriana Barna
- (Germany) Anca Barna
3
6

- (Czech Republic) **P Langrová**
- (Slovakia) **R Zrubáková**
**w/o**

WC
- (Austria) M Schnell
- (Austria) P Schwarz
4
2

4
- (Australia) C Barclay
- (Poland) M Grzybowska

4
- (Australia) **C Barclay**
- (Poland) **M Grzybowska**
**6**
**6**

- (Czech Republic) P Langrová
- (Slovakia) R Zrubáková
3
1

- (France) **C Dhenin**
- (Georgia (country)) **N Louarsabishvili**
**6**
**6**

2
- (Czech Republic) **E Melicharová**
- (Czech Republic) **H Vildová**
**6**
**6**

- (Italy) S Cecchini
- (Italy) F Perfetti
3
2

- (France) C Dhenin
- (Georgia (country)) N Louarsabishvili
3
3

- (Czech Republic) M Nekvapilova
- (Czech Republic) H Šromová
5
3

2
- (Czech Republic) **E Melicharová**
- (Czech Republic) **H Vildová**
**6**
**6**

2
- (Czech Republic) **E Melicharová**
- (Czech Republic) **H Vildová**
**7**
**6**
