= 1998 Prokom Polish Open – Singles =

Singles
- 1998 Prokom Polish Open

Final
- Champion: (Slovakia) Henrieta Nagyová
- Runner-up: (Germany) Elena Wagner
- Score: 6–3, 5–7, 6–1

Details
- Draw: 32
- Seeds: 8

Events
Singles	Doubles
Prokom Polish Open	· 1999 →

Henrieta Nagyová won in the final 6–3, 5–7, 6–1 against Elena Wagner.

== Seeds ==
A champion seed is indicated in bold text, while text in italics indicates the round in which that seed was eliminated.

1. (Slovakia) **Henrieta Nagyová (champion)**
2. (Poland) Magdalena Grzybowska (withdrew)
3. (Spain) Virginia Ruano Pascual (withdrew)
4. (France) Sarah Pitkowski (second round)
5. (Spain) Gala León García (semifinals)
6. (Israel) Anna Smashnova (semifinals)
7. (Russia) Tatiana Panova (first round)
8. (Netherlands) Kristie Boogert (second round)
9. (Czech Republic) Květa Hrdličková (quarterfinals)

== Draw ==
=== Key ===
- Q = Qualifier
- WC = Wild card
- LL = Lucky loser
- Alt = Alternate
- ITF = ITF entry
- PR = Protected ranking
- SR = Special ranking
- SE = Special exempt
- JE = Junior exempt
- JR = Junior Accelerator Programme entrant
- CO = College Accelerator Programme entrant
- NG = Next Gen Accelerator Program entrant
- w/o = Walkover
- r = Retired
- d = Defaulted

First round
1	(Slovakia) **H Nagyová**	**6**	**6**
(Netherlands) S Noorlander	2	2
(Slovakia) **J Husárová**	**6**	**6**
WC	(Poland) A Olsza	2	1
(Slovakia) K Studeníková	2	3
(Italy) **F Perfetti**	**6**	**6**
(Spain) **C Torrens Valero**	**7**	**7**
7	(Russia) T Panova	5	6
4	(France) **S Pitkowski**	**6**	**6**
(Italy) L Golarsa	4	3
(Germany) **B Rittner**	3	**6**	**6**
Q	(Germany) S Schmidle	**6**	3	2
(United States) **M Shaughnessy**	**6**	**6**
(Italy) S Cecchini	3	0
WC	(France) K Jagieniak	2	2
5	(Spain) **G León García**	**6**	**6**
6	(Israel) **A Smashnova**	**7**	**6**
LL	(Czech Republic) A Vašková	6	3
Q	(Czech Republic) R Pelikánová	**6**	6	6
LL	(Bulgaria) **S Krivencheva**	3	**7**	**7**
Q	(Belgium) L Courtois	1	4
(Austria) **M Maruska**	**6**	**6**
(Sweden) Å Carlsson	**6**	4	3
9	(Czech Republic) **K Hrdličková**	3	**6**	**6**
8	(Netherlands) **K Boogert**	**6**	**6**
(Czech Republic) D Chládková	3	3
LL	(Czech Republic) H Šromová	2	1
(Germany) **E Wagner**	**6**	**6**
Q	(Germany) **M Weingärtner**	**6**	**6**
(Czech Republic) L Němečková	1	0
LL	(Italy) **G Di Natale**	4	**7**	**6**
LL	(Czech Republic) B Kumbárová	**6**	5	2

Second round
1	(Slovakia) **H Nagyová**	**6**	**6**
(Slovakia) J Husárová	0	4
(Italy) F Perfetti	3	2
(Spain) **C Torrens Valero**	**6**	**6**
4	(France) S Pitkowski	1	3
(Germany) **B Rittner**	**6**	**6**
(United States) M Shaughnessy	3	2
5	(Spain) **G León García**	**6**	**6**
6	(Israel) **A Smashnova**	**6**	**6**
LL	(Bulgaria) S Krivencheva	4	2
(Austria) M Maruska	0	**6**	5
9	(Czech Republic) **K Hrdličková**	**6**	2	**7**
8	(Netherlands) K Boogert	**6**	1	4
(Germany) **E Wagner**	4	**6**	**6**
(Germany) **M Weingärtner**	1	**6**	**7**
LL	(Italy) G Di Natale	**6**	4	5

Quarterfinals
1	(Slovakia) **H Nagyová**	**6**	**6**
(Spain) C Torrens Valero	4	1
(Germany) B Rittner	**6**	4	4
5	(Spain) **G León García**	3	**6**	**6**
6	(Israel) **A Smashnova**	**6**	**7**
9	(Czech Republic) K Hrdličková	3	6
(Germany) **E Wagner**	**6**	**7**
(Germany) M Weingärtner	2	6

Semifinals
1	(Slovakia) **H Nagyová**	1	**6**	**6**
5	(Spain) G León García	**6**	4	1
6	(Israel) A Smashnova	3	**6**	4
(Germany) **E Wagner**	**6**	0	**6**

Final
1	(Slovakia) **Henrieta Nagyová**	**6**	5	**6**
(Germany) Elena Wagner	3	**7**	1
