= 1997 Meta Styrian Open =

- Date: 28 July – 3 August
- Edition: 25th
- Category: Tier IV
- Draw: 32S / 16D
- Prize money: $107,500
- Surface: Clay / outdoor
- Location: Maria Lankowitz, Austria

Champions

Singles
- (Austria) Barbara Schett

Doubles
- (Czech Republic) Eva Melicharová / (Czech Republic) Helena Vildová
- WTA Austrian Open

The 1997 Meta Styrian Open was a women's tennis tournament played on outdoor clay courts at the Sportpark Piberstein in Maria Lankowitz in Austria that was part of the Tier IV category of the 1997 WTA Tour. It was the 25th edition of the tournament and was held from 28 July through 3 August 1997. Fifth-seeded Barbara Schett won the singles title.

== Finals ==
=== Singles ===
(Austria) Barbara Schett defeated (Slovakia) Henrieta Nagyová 3–6, 6–2, 6–3

- It was Schett's only singles title of the year and the 2nd of her career.

=== Doubles ===
(Czech Republic) Eva Melicharová / (Czech Republic) Helena Vildová defeated (Czech Republic) Radka Bobková / (Germany) Wiltrud Probst 6–2, 6–2

- It was Melicharova's 2nd and last doubles title of the year and of her career. It was Vildova's 2nd and last doubles title of the year and the 2nd of her career.
