= 2003 Proximus Diamond Games – Doubles =

Doubles
- 2003 Proximus Diamond Games

Final
- Champions: (Belgium) Kim Clijsters (Japan) Ai Sugiyama
- Runners-up: (France) Nathalie Dechy (France) Émilie Loit
- Score: 6–2, 6–0

Events
Singles	Doubles
← 2002 ·	Diamond Games	· 2004 →

Magdalena Maleeva and Patty Schnyder were the defending champions, but Maleeva did not compete this year, as she was competing in Doha at the same week. Schnyder teamed up with Maja Matevžič and lost in semifinals to Nathalie Dechy and Émilie Loit.

Kim Clijsters and Ai Sugiyama won the title by defeating Nathalie Dechy and Émilie Loit 6–2, 6–0 in the final.

== Seeds ==
1. (Belgium) Kim Clijsters / (Japan) Ai Sugiyama (champions)
2. (France) Nathalie Dechy / (France) Émilie Loit (final)
3. (Czech Republic) Dája Bedáňová / (Federal Republic of Yugoslavia) Jelena Dokic (semifinals)
4. (Slovenia) Maja Matevžič / (Switzerland) Patty Schnyder (semifinals)

== Draw ==
=== Key ===
- Q = Qualifier
- WC = Wild card
- LL = Lucky loser
- Alt = Alternate
- SE = Special exempt
- PR = Protected ranking
- ITF = ITF entry
- JE = Junior exempt
- w/o = Walkover
- r = Retired
- d = Defaulted
- SR = Special ranking

=== Draw ===
First round
1	(Belgium) K Clijsters (Japan) A Sugiyama	6	6
(Germany) V Henke (Luxembourg) C Schaul	0	0
(Netherlands) K Boogert (Spain) M Serna	6	6
(Ukraine) Y Beygelzimer (Russia) A Rodionova	2	4
3	(Czech Republic) D Bedáňová (Federal Republic of Yugoslavia) J Dokic	6	6
(Netherlands) A Hopmans (Belgium) P Van Acker	1	4
WC	(Belgium) E Clijsters (Belgium) K Flipkens	5	6	6
(Hungary) Z Gubacsi (Ukraine) T Perebiynis	7	3	3
LL	(Belgium) C Maes (Ukraine) J Vakulenko	6^{5}	7^{9}	6^{6}
(Spain) M Marrero (Germany) A Roesch	7^{7}	6^{7}	7^{8}
(Netherlands) D Haak (Netherlands) S Noorlander	1	0
4	(Slovenia) M Matevžič (Switzerland) P Schnyder	6	6
(France) C Dhenin (Ukraine) E Tatarkova	7^{9}	6
Q	(Belgium) L Butkiewicz (Netherlands) K Kilsdonk	6^{7}	3
(Bulgaria) L Bacheva (Germany) K Freye	1	2
2	(France) N Dechy (France) É Loit	6	6

Quarterfinals
1	(Belgium) K Clijsters (Japan) A Sugiyama	6	6
(Netherlands) K Boogert (Spain) M Serna	2	1
3	(Czech Republic) D Bedáňová (Federal Republic of Yugoslavia) J Dokic	6	6
WC	(Belgium) E Clijsters (Belgium) K Flipkens	3	4
(Spain) M Marrero (Germany) A Roesch	2	6	4
4	(Slovenia) M Matevžič (Switzerland) P Schnyder	6	3	6
(France) C Dhenin (Ukraine) E Tatarkova	2	2
2	(France) N Dechy (France) É Loit	6	6

Semifinals
1	(Belgium) K Clijsters (Japan) A Sugiyama	6	6
3	(Czech Republic) D Bedáňová (Federal Republic of Yugoslavia) J Dokic	2	0
4	(Slovenia) M Matevžič (Switzerland) P Schnyder	3	2
2	(France) N Dechy (France) É Loit	6	6

Final
1	(Belgium) K Clijsters (Japan) A Sugiyama	6	6
2	(France) N Dechy (France) É Loit	2	0
