= 1996 Meta Styrian Open – Singles =

Singles
- 1996 Meta Styrian Open
- 1995 Champion: (Austria) Judith Wiesner

Final
- Champion: (Austria) Barbara Paulus
- Runner-up: (Italy) Sandra Cecchini
- Score: (Cecchini retired)

Details
- Draw: 32
- Seeds: 8

Events
Singles	Doubles
- Meta Styrian Open

Judith Wiesner was the defending champion but lost in the first round to Lenka Cenková.

Barbara Paulus won when Sandra Cecchini was forced to retire in the first game of the final.

== Seeds ==
A champion seed is indicated in bold text while text in italics indicates the round in which that seed was eliminated.

1. (Austria) **Barbara Paulus (champion)**
2. (Austria) Judith Wiesner (first round)
3. (Bulgaria) Elena Pampoulova (first round)
4. (Slovakia) Henrieta Nagyová (second round)
5. (Austria) Sandra Dopfer (second round)
6. (Italy) Flora Perfetti (second round)
7. (Spain) María Sánchez Lorenzo (first round)
8. (Slovakia) Janette Husárová (second round)

== Draw ==
Key

- Q = Qualifier
- WC = Wild card
- LL = Lucky loser
- Alt = Alternate
- ITF = ITF entry
- PR = Protected ranking
- SR = Special ranking
- SE = Special exempt
- JE = Junior exempt
- JR = Junior Accelerator Programme entrant
- CO = College Accelerator Programme entrant
- NG = Next Gen Accelerator Program entrant
- w/o = Walkover
- r = Retired
- d = Defaulted

First round
1	(Austria) **B Paulus**	**6**	4	**6**
(Spain) Á Montolio	0	**6**	4
Q	(Hungary) **K Miskolczi**	**7**	**6**
(Israel) A Smashnova	5	4
Q	(Romania) **C Cristea**	**6**	0	**6**
(Austria) M Schnell	1	**6**	0
(Czech Republic) **P Langrová**	**6**	**6**
7	(Spain) M Sánchez Lorenzo	4	4
4	(Slovakia) **H Nagyová**	**6**	**6**
(Czech Republic) R Bobková	2	4
(Czech Republic) K Kroupová	4	**6**	2
(Belgium) **S Devillé**	**6**	3	**6**
(Germany) A Glass	**6**	4	1
(Spain) **C Torrens Valero**	3	**6**	**6**
(Germany) W Probst	3	2
5	(Austria) **S Dopfer**	**6**	**6**
6	(Italy) **F Perfetti**	5	**7**	**6**
(Austria) M Maruska	**7**	6	4
(Argentina) **B Fulco-Villella**	**6**	**6**
(Ukraine) N Medvedeva	4	1
WC	(Austria) N Ninaus	1	0
Q	(Germany) **M Zivec-Skulj**	**6**	**6**
(Croatia) **S Talaja**	2	**6**	**6**
3	(Bulgaria) E Pampoulova	**6**	4	3
8	(Slovakia) **J Husárová**	**6**	**6**
WC	(Austria) B Schwartz	3	4
(Germany) A Barna	**6**	3	4
(Italy) **S Cecchini**	2	**6**	**6**
Q	(Italy) **L Garrone**	**6**	**6**
(Germany) V Martinek	3	1
(Czech Republic) **L Cenková**	**6**	**7**
2	(Austria) J Wiesner	4	6

Second round
1	(Austria) **B Paulus**	**6**	**6**
Q	(Hungary) K Miskolczi	2	3
Q	(Romania) C Cristea	**6**	5	1
(Czech Republic) **P Langrová**	3	**7**	**6**
4	(Slovakia) H Nagyová	6	3
(Belgium) **S Devillé**	**7**	**6**
(Spain) **C Torrens Valero**	1	**6**	**6**
5	(Austria) S Dopfer	**6**	1	3
6	(Italy) F Perfetti	4	**7**	6
(Argentina) **B Fulco-Villella**	**6**	6	**7**
Q	(Germany) M Zivec-Skulj	1	2
(Croatia) **S Talaja**	**6**	**6**
8	(Slovakia) J Husárová	**6**	4	4
(Italy) **S Cecchini**	4	**6**	**6**
Q	(Italy) L Garrone	4	0
(Czech Republic) **L Cenková**	**6**	**6**

Quarterfinals
1	(Austria) **B Paulus**	**6**	**6**
(Czech Republic) P Langrová	3	2
(Belgium) **S Devillé**	**6**	**6**
(Spain) C Torrens Valero	3	2
(Argentina) B Fulco-Villella	3	**6**	4
(Croatia) **S Talaja**	**6**	2	**6**
(Italy) **S Cecchini**	**6**	5	**6**
(Czech Republic) L Cenková	3	**7**	2

Semifinals
1	(Austria) **B Paulus**	**6**	**7**
(Belgium) S Devillé	1	5
(Croatia) S Talaja	3	2
(Italy) **S Cecchini**	**6**	**6**

Final
1	(Austria) **Barbara Paulus**	0(40)
(Italy) Sandra Cecchini	0(15)r
