= 1998 Piberstein Styrian Open – Doubles =

Doubles
- 1998 Piberstein Styrian Open

Final
- Champions: (Argentina) Laura Montalvo (Argentina) Paola Suárez
- Runners-up: (Slovenia) Tina Križan (Slovenia) Katarina Srebotnik
- Score: 6–1, 6–2

Details
- Draw: 16
- Seeds: 4

Events
Singles	Doubles
- Piberstein Styrian Open

Eva Melicharová and Helena Vildová were the defending champions but did not compete that year.

Laura Montalvo and Paola Suárez won in the final 6–1, 6–2 against Tina Križan and Katarina Srebotnik.

== Seeds ==
Champion seeds are indicated in bold text while text in italics indicates the round in which those seeds were eliminated.

1. (Austria) Barbara Schett / (Switzerland) Patty Schnyder (first round)
2. (Belgium) Sabine Appelmans / (Netherlands) Kristie Boogert (semifinals)
3. (Argentina) **Laura Montalvo** / (Argentina) **Paola Suárez (champions)**
4. (Germany) Meike Babel / (Germany) Elena Wagner (quarterfinals)

== Draw ==
Key

- Q = Qualifier
- WC = Wild card
- LL = Lucky loser
- Alt = Alternate
- ITF = ITF entry
- PR = Protected ranking
- SR = Special ranking
- SE = Special exempt
- JE = Junior exempt
- JR = Junior Accelerator Programme entrant
- CO = College Accelerator Programme entrant
- NG = Next Gen Accelerator Program entrant
- w/o = Walkover
- r = Retired
- d = Defaulted

First round
1	(Austria) B Schett (Switzerland) P Schnyder	4	6
(Slovenia) **T Križan** (Slovenia) **K Srebotnik**	**6**	**7**
WC	(Austria) S Plischke (Austria) B Schwartz
(Italy) **S Cecchini** (Austria) **M Maruska**	**w/o**
4	(Germany) **M Babel** (Germany) **E Wagner**	**6**	**6**
(Italy) G Casoni (Romania) R Sandu	3	3
(Germany) S Klösel (Croatia) M Murić	4	2
(France) **A Dechaume-Balleret** (Germany) **B Rittner**	**6**	**6**
(Austria) K Kschwendt (Italy) F Perfetti	4	1
(Japan) **S Obata** (Thailand) **B Sangaram**	**6**	**6**
(Spain) G León García (Spain) C Torrens Valero	**6**	2	2
3	(Argentina) **L Montalvo** (Argentina) **P Suárez**	4	**6**	**6**
(Switzerland) **E Gagliardi** (Italy) **A Serra Zanetti**	**6**	2	**6**
Q	(Argentina) G Aizenberg (Czech Republic) S Kleinová	4	**6**	4
(France) A Cocheteux (Paraguay) L Schaerer	1	4
2	(Belgium) **S Appelmans** (Netherlands) **K Boogert**	**6**	**6**

Quarterfinals
(Slovenia) **T Križan** (Slovenia) **K Srebotnik**	**6**	**6**
(Italy) S Cecchini (Austria) M Maruska	1	2
4	(Germany) M Babel (Germany) E Wagner	6	4
(France) **A Dechaume-Balleret** (Germany) **B Rittner**	**7**	**6**
(Japan) S Obata (Thailand) B Sangaram	**6**	3	2
3	(Argentina) **L Montalvo** (Argentina) **P Suárez**	4	**6**	**6**
(Switzerland) E Gagliardi (Italy) A Serra Zanetti	2	5
2	(Belgium) **S Appelmans** (Netherlands) **K Boogert**	**6**	**7**

Semifinals
(Slovenia) **T Križan** (Slovenia) **K Srebotnik**	**6**	**6**
(France) A Dechaume-Balleret (Germany) B Rittner	4	2
3	(Argentina) **L Montalvo** (Argentina) **P Suárez**	**6**	**6**
2	(Belgium) S Appelmans (Netherlands) K Boogert	4	4

Final
(Slovenia) Tina Križan (Slovenia) Katarina Srebotnik	1	2
3	(Argentina) **Laura Montalvo** (Argentina) **Paola Suárez**	**6**	**6**
