= 2004 Proximus Diamond Games – Doubles =

Doubles
- 2004 Proximus Diamond Games

Final
- Champions: (Zimbabwe) Cara Black (Belgium) Els Callens
- Runners-up: (Switzerland) Myriam Casanova (Greece) Eleni Daniilidou
- Score: 6–2, 6–1

Events
Singles	Doubles
← 2003 ·	Diamond Games	· 2005 →

Kim Clijsters and Ai Sugiyama were the defending champions, but Sugiyama did not compete this year. Clijsters teamed up with her sister Elke Clijsters and lost in quarterfinals to Émilie Loit and Petra Mandula.

Cara Black and Els Callens won the title by defeating Myriam Casanova and Eleni Daniilidou 6–2, 6–1 in the final.

== Seeds ==
1. (Zimbabwe) Cara Black / (Belgium) Els Callens (champions)
2. (France) Émilie Loit / (Hungary) Petra Mandula (semifinals)
3. (Estonia) Maret Ani / (Slovakia) Janette Husárová (quarterfinals, withdrew due to a right shoulder strain on Husárová)
4. (Switzerland) Myriam Casanova / (Greece) Eleni Daniilidou (final)

== Draw ==
=== Key ===
- Q = Qualifier
- WC = Wild card
- LL = Lucky loser
- Alt = Alternate
- SE = Special exempt
- PR = Protected ranking
- ITF = ITF entry
- JE = Junior exempt
- w/o = Walkover
- r = Retired
- d = Defaulted
- SR = Special ranking

=== Draw ===
First round
1	(Zimbabwe) C Black (Belgium) E Callens	7^{8}	7^{7}
(Spain) A Parra Santonja (Spain) M Serna	6^{6}	6^{3}
(Germany) An Barna (Germany) C Schneider	2	6	6
WC	(Belgium) C Maes (Switzerland) MG Mikaelian	6	1	3
3	(Estonia) M Ani (Slovakia) J Husárová	6	2	6
(Bulgaria) L Bacheva (Germany) A Rösch	2	6	4
(France) S Foretz (Luxembourg) C Schaul	6	3	2
(France) C Dhenin (Hungary) K Marosi	3	6	6
(Czech Republic) D Chládková (Russia) E Dementieva
Q	(Germany) Ad Barna (Canada) M Drake	w/o
(Austria) D Klemenschits (Austria) S Klemenschits	2	1
4	(Switzerland) M Casanova (Greece) E Daniilidou	6	6
(Tunisia) S Sfar (Netherlands) C Vis	1	0
(Belgium) E Clijsters (Belgium) K Clijsters	6	6
(Latvia) L Dekmeijere (Ukraine) J Vakulenko	7^{7}	1	1
2	(France) É Loit (Hungary) P Mandula	6^{3}	6	6

Quarterfinals
1	(Zimbabwe) C Black (Belgium) E Callens	6	6
(Germany) An Barna (Germany) C Schneider	4	4
3	(Estonia) M Ani (Slovakia) J Husárová
(France) C Dhenin (Hungary) K Marosi	w/o
Q	(Germany) Ad Barna (Canada) M Drake	3	2
4	(Switzerland) M Casanova (Greece) E Daniilidou	6	6
(Belgium) E Clijsters (Belgium) K Clijsters	2	2
2	(France) É Loit (Hungary) P Mandula	6	6

Semifinals
1	(Zimbabwe) C Black (Belgium) E Callens	6	6
(France) C Dhenin (Hungary) K Marosi	3	3
4	(Switzerland) M Casanova (Greece) E Daniilidou	6	2	7^{7}
2	(France) É Loit (Hungary) P Mandula	3	6	6^{5}

Final
1	(Zimbabwe) C Black (Belgium) E Callens	6	6
4	(Switzerland) M Casanova (Greece) E Daniilidou	2	1
