= 1995 Styrian Open – Doubles =

Doubles
- 1995 Styrian Open
- 1994 Champions: (Italy) Sandra Cecchini; (Argentina) Patricia Tarabini

Final
- Champions: (Italy) Silvia Farina; (Hungary) Andrea Temesvári
- Runners-up: (France) Alexandra Fusai; (Germany) Wiltrud Probst
- Score: 6–2, 6–2

Details
- Draw: 16
- Seeds: 4

Events
Singles	Doubles
- Styrian Open

Sandra Cecchini and Patricia Tarabini were the defending champions but only Cecchini competed that year with Laura Garrone.

Cecchini and Garrone lost in the quarterfinals to Virag Csurgo and Flora Perfetti.

Silvia Farina and Andrea Temesvári won in the final 6–2, 6–2 against Alexandra Fusai and Wiltrud Probst.

== Seeds ==
Champion seeds are indicated in bold text while text in italics indicates the round in which those seeds were eliminated.

1. (France) Alexandra Fusai / (Germany) Wiltrud Probst (final)
2. (Italy) **Silvia Farina** / (Hungary) **Andrea Temesvári (champions)**
3. (Austria) Petra Schwarz / (Slovakia) Katarína Studeníková (semifinals)
4. (Italy) Sandra Cecchini / (Italy) Laura Garrone (quarterfinals)

== Draw ==
Key

- Q = Qualifier
- WC = Wild card
- LL = Lucky loser
- Alt = Alternate
- ITF = ITF entry
- PR = Protected ranking
- SR = Special ranking
- SE = Special exempt
- JE = Junior exempt
- JR = Junior Accelerator Programme entrant
- CO = College Accelerator Programme entrant
- NG = Next Gen Accelerator Program entrant
- w/o = Walkover
- r = Retired
- d = Defaulted

First round

Quarterfinals

Semifinals

Final

1
- (France) **A Fusai**
- (Germany) **W Probst**
0
**6**
**6**

- (Federal Republic of Yugoslavia) T Ječmenica
- (Moldova) S Komleva
**6**
2
4

1
- (France) **A Fusai**
- (Germany) **W Probst**
**6**
**6**

WC
- (Austria) E Fauth
- (Austria) N Murn
1
3

- (Germany) J Kandarr
- (Germany) S Meier
2
3

- (Germany) **J Kandarr**
- (Germany) **S Meier**
**6**
**6**

1
- (France) **A Fusai**
- (Germany) **W Probst**
**6**
**6**

4
- (Italy) **S Cecchini**
- (Italy) **L Garrone**
**6**
0
**6**

- (Hungary) V Csurgó
- (Italy) F Perfetti
4
2

- (Spain) Á Montolio
- (Spain) S Ramón-Cortés
4
**6**
3

4
- (Italy) S Cecchini
- (Italy) L Garrone
5
3

Q
- (Spain) N Ávila Bonastre
- (Austria) S Moser
2
0

- (Hungary) **V Csurgó**
- (Italy) **F Perfetti**
**7**
**6**

- (Hungary) **V Csurgó**
- (Italy) **F Perfetti**
**6**
**6**

1
- (France) Alexandra Fusai
- (Germany) Wiltrud Probst
2
2

- (Czech Republic) **R Pelikánová**
- (Czech Republic) **A Vašková**
**6**
3
**7**

2
- (Italy) **Silvia Farina**
- (Hungary) **Andrea Temesvári**
**6**
**6**

- (Austria) S Dopfer
- (Austria) B Schett
2
**6**
5

- (Czech Republic) R Pelikánová
- (Czech Republic) A Vašková
6
4

- (Argentina) B Fulco-Villella
- (Slovenia) T Križan
1
2

3
- (Austria) **P Schwarz**
- (Slovakia) **K Studeníková**
**7**
**6**

3
- (Austria) **P Schwarz**
- (Slovakia) **K Studeníková**
**6**
**6**

3
- (Austria) P Schwarz
- (Slovakia) K Studeníková
6
6

LL
- (Austria) S Resch
- (Croatia) P Rihtaric
0
1

2
- (Italy) **S Farina**
- (Hungary) **A Temesvári**
**7**
**7**

- (Chinese Taipei) **J Lee**
- (Croatia) **S Talaja**
**6**
**6**

- (Chinese Taipei) J Lee
- (Croatia) S Talaja
2
1

- (Czech Republic) E Martincová
- (Czech Republic) J Pospíšilová
5
3

2
- (Italy) **S Farina**
- (Hungary) **A Temesvári**
**6**
**6**

2
- (Italy) **S Farina**
- (Hungary) **A Temesvári**
**7**
**6**
