= 2003 Proximus Diamond Games – Singles =

Singles
- 2003 Proximus Diamond Games

Final
- Champion: (United States) Venus Williams
- Runner-up: (Belgium) Kim Clijsters
- Score: 6–2, 6–4

Details
- Draw: 28
- Seeds: 8

Events
Singles	Doubles
- Diamond Games

Venus Williams was the defending champion. and successfully retained her title by defeating Kim Clijsters 6–2, 6–4 in the final.

== Seeds ==
The top four seeds receive a bye into the second round.

1. (United States) Venus Williams (champion)
2. (Belgium) Kim Clijsters (final)
3. (Belgium) Justine Henin-Hardenne (semifinals)
4. (Slovakia) Daniela Hantuchová (semifinals)
5. (France) ~~Amélie Mauresmo~~ (withdrew due to an adductor strain)
6. (Federal Republic of Yugoslavia) Jelena Dokic (first round)
7. (Switzerland) Patty Schnyder (quarterfinals)
8. (France) Nathalie Dechy (quarterfinals)
9. (United States) Alexandra Stevenson (first round)

== Draw ==
Key

- Q = Qualifier
- WC = Wild card
- LL = Lucky loser
- Alt = Alternate
- ITF = ITF entry
- PR = Protected ranking
- SR = Special ranking
- SE = Special exempt
- JE = Junior exempt
- JR = Junior Accelerator Programme entrant
- CO = College Accelerator Programme entrant
- NG = Next Gen Accelerator Program entrant
- w/o = Walkover
- r = Retired
- d = Defaulted

=== Finals ===
Semifinals
1	(United States) Venus Williams	6	6
4	(Slovakia) Daniela Hantuchová	1	4
3	(Belgium) Justine Henin-Hardenne	2	6^{3}
2	(Belgium) Kim Clijsters	6	7^{7}

Final
1	(United States) Venus Williams	6	6
2	(Belgium) Kim Clijsters	2	4

=== Top half ===
First round
(Czech Republic) D Bedáňová	2	3
(Slovenia) M Matevžič	6	6
(Slovenia) T Pisnik	6	4	6
(Italy) R Grande	3	6	3
Q	(France) V Razzano	6	6
9	(United States) A Stevenson	3	2
(Belgium) E Callens	6	6
Q	(Madagascar) D Randriantefy	1	2
Q	(Germany) V Henke	1	1
(Slovakia) J Husárová	6	6
LL	(Luxembourg) C Schaul	4	3
8	(France) N Dechy	6	6

Second round
1	(United States) V Williams	6	6
(Slovenia) M Matevžič	1	1
(Slovenia) T Pisnik	4	6	6
Q	(France) V Razzano	6	3	0
4	(Slovakia) D Hantuchová	5	6	6
(Belgium) E Callens	7	4	3
(Slovakia) J Husárová	6	3	0
8	(France) N Dechy	1	6	6

Quarterfinals
1	(United States) V Williams	6	6
(Slovenia) T Pisnik	1	4
4	(Slovakia) D Hantuchová	7^{7}	7^{8}
8	(France) N Dechy	6^{4}	6^{6}

Semifinals
1	(United States) V Williams	6	6
4	(Slovakia) D Hantuchová	1	4

=== Bottom half ===
First round
6	(Federal Republic of Yugoslavia) J Dokic	5	7	3
(Japan) A Sugiyama	7	5	6
(Spain) M Serna	7^{7}	1	1
(Germany) A Roesch	6^{3}	6	6
Q	(Czech Republic) Z Ondrášková	6	6^{5}	6
(France) É Loit	2	7^{7}	3
7	(Switzerland) P Schnyder	6	6
WC	(Belgium) E Clijsters	2	3
(Czech Republic) D Chládková	6	4	6
(Czech Republic) I Benešová	3	6	2
WC	(Belgium) K Flipkens	3	5
(Switzerland) M Casanova	6	7

Second round
(Japan) A Sugiyama	6	6
(Germany) A Roesch	1	1
Q	(Czech Republic) Z Ondrášková	4	6^{2}
3	(Belgium) J Henin-Hardenne	6	7^{7}
7	(Switzerland) P Schnyder	7	6
(Czech Republic) D Chládková	5	0
(Switzerland) M Casanova	3	2
2	(Belgium) K Clijsters	6	6

Quarterfinals
(Japan) A Sugiyama	2	4
3	(Belgium) J Henin-Hardenne	6	6
7	(Switzerland) P Schnyder	5	1
2	(Belgium) K Clijsters	7	6

Semifinals
3	(Belgium) J Henin-Hardenne	2	6^{3}
2	(Belgium) K Clijsters	6	7^{7}
