= 2002 Proximus Diamond Games =

Tennis tournament

- Date: 11–17 February
- Edition: 1st
- Category: Tier II
- Draw: 28S / 16D
- Prize money: $585,000
- Surface: Carpet / indoor
- Location: Antwerp, Belgium
- Venue: Sportpaleis

Champions

Singles
- (United States) Venus Williams

Doubles
- (Bulgaria) Magdalena Maleeva / (Switzerland) Patty Schnyder
| Proximus Diamond Games | · 2003 → |

The 2002 Proximus Diamond Games was a women's professional tennis tournament played on indoor carpet courts at the Sportpaleis in Antwerp, Belgium that was part of the Tier II category of the 2002 WTA Tour. It was the inaugural edition of the tournament and was held from 11 February until 17 February 2002. First-seeded Venus Williams won the singles title and earned $93,000 first-prize money.

== Finals ==
=== Singles ===
(United States) Venus Williams defeated (Belgium) Justine Henin, 6–3, 5–7, 6–3

=== Doubles ===
(Bulgaria) Magdalena Maleeva / (Switzerland) Patty Schnyder defeated (France) Nathalie Dechy / (United States) Meilen Tu, 6–3, 6–7^{(3–7)}, 6–3
