= 1998 Piberstein Styrian Open – Singles =

Singles
- 1998 Piberstein Styrian Open

Final
- Champion: (Switzerland) Patty Schnyder
- Runner-up: (Spain) Gala León García
- Score: 6–2, 4–6, 6–3

Details
- Draw: 32
- Seeds: 8

Events
Singles	Doubles
- Piberstein Styrian Open

Barbara Schett was the defending champion but lost in the quarterfinals to Emmanuelle Gagliardi.

Patty Schnyder won in the final 6–2, 4–6, 6–3 against Gala León García.

== Seeds ==
A champion seed is indicated in bold text while text in italics indicates the round in which that seed was eliminated.

1. (Switzerland) **Patty Schnyder (champion)**
2. (Belgium) Sabine Appelmans (first round)
3. (Austria) Barbara Paulus (quarterfinals)
4. (Austria) Barbara Schett (quarterfinals)
5. (Spain) Gala León García (final)
6. (Austria) Sylvia Plischke (quarterfinals)
7. (Czech Republic) Sandra Kleinová (first round)
8. (Switzerland) Emmanuelle Gagliardi (semifinals)

== Draw ==
Key

- Q = Qualifier
- WC = Wild card
- LL = Lucky loser
- Alt = Alternate
- ITF = ITF entry
- PR = Protected ranking
- SR = Special ranking
- SE = Special exempt
- JE = Junior exempt
- JR = Junior Accelerator Programme entrant
- CO = College Accelerator Programme entrant
- NG = Next Gen Accelerator Program entrant
- w/o = Walkover
- r = Retired
- d = Defaulted

First round
1	(Switzerland) **P Schnyder**	**6**	**6**
(Canada) J Nejedly	4	1
(Austria) **M Maruska**	4	**7**	**6**
(Germany) B Rittner	**6**	5	3
(Netherlands) **K Boogert**	**6**	3	**6**
WC	(Austria) P Wartusch	3	**6**	3
(Italy) F Perfetti	**6**	2	2
6	(Austria) **S Plischke**	4	**6**	**6**
4	(Austria) **B Schett**	**6**	**6**
WC	(Austria) E Fauth	1	1
(Spain) **C Torrens Valero**	**6**	**6**
(Bulgaria) P Stoyanova	2	1
(Slovakia) **K Studeníková**	6	**6**	**7**
(Italy) F Lubiani	**7**	4	5
(Germany) S Klösel	6	0
8	(Switzerland) **E Gagliardi**	**7**	**6**
5	(Spain) **G León García**	**6**	1	**7**
Q	(Croatia) S Talaja	1	**6**	5
(Germany) **E Wagner**	**6**	**6**
(Argentina) P Suárez	4	0
Q	(Italy) **A Serra Zanetti**	**7**	**6**
(Austria) B Schwartz	6	3
(France) A Dechaume-Balleret	1	2
3	(Austria) **B Paulus**	**6**	**6**
7	(Czech Republic) S Kleinová	4	2
(France) **A Cocheteux**	**6**	**6**
Q	(Austria) **S Dopfer**	**6**	**7**
(Germany) J Kandarr	3	5
Q	(Romania) R Sandu	4	1
(Italy) **S Cecchini**	**6**	**6**
(Germany) **M Babel**	**6**	**6**
2	(Belgium) S Appelmans	3	2

Second round
1	(Switzerland) **P Schnyder**	**6**	**6**
(Austria) M Maruska	0	1
(Netherlands) K Boogert	5	**6**	6
6	(Austria) **S Plischke**	**7**	3	**7**
4	(Austria) **B Schett**	**6**	**7**
(Spain) C Torrens Valero	4	5
(Slovakia) K Studeníková	6	4
8	(Switzerland) **E Gagliardi**	**7**	**6**
5	(Spain) **G León García**	5	**6**	**6**
(Germany) E Wagner	**7**	2	3
Q	(Italy) A Serra Zanetti	2	3
3	(Austria) **B Paulus**	**6**	**6**
(France) **A Cocheteux**	**7**	**7**
Q	(Austria) S Dopfer	5	6
(Italy) S Cecchini	1	1
(Germany) **M Babel**	**6**	**6**

Quarterfinals
1	(Switzerland) **P Schnyder**	**6**	**6**
6	(Austria) S Plischke	2	2
4	(Austria) B Schett	**6**	2	6
8	(Switzerland) **E Gagliardi**	0	**6**	**7**
5	(Spain) **G León García**	4	**6**	**6**
3	(Austria) B Paulus	**6**	4	3
(France) **A Cocheteux**	**6**	**6**
(Germany) M Babel	1	4

Semifinals
1	(Switzerland) **P Schnyder**	**6**	**6**
8	(Switzerland) E Gagliardi	2	4
5	(Spain) **G León García**	**6**	**6**
(France) A Cocheteux	0	3

Final
1	(Switzerland) **Patty Schnyder**	**6**	4	**6**
5	(Spain) Gala León García	2	**6**	3
