= 2002 Proximus Diamond Games – Singles =

Singles
- 2002 Proximus Diamond Games

Final
- Champion: (United States) Venus Williams
- Runner-up: (Belgium) Justine Henin
- Score: 6–3, 5–7, 6–3

Details
- Draw: 28
- Seeds: 8

Events
Singles	Doubles
- Diamond Games

In the inaugural edition of the tournament, Venus Williams won the title by defeating Justine Henin 6–3, 5–7, 6–3 in the final.

== Seeds ==
The first four seeds received a bye into the second round.

1. (United States) Venus Williams (champion)
2. (Belgium) Justine Henin (final)
3. (France) Amélie Mauresmo (semifinals)
4. (Federal Republic of Yugoslavia) Jelena Dokic (second round, retired due to a right adductor strain)
5. (Italy) Silvia Farina Elia (quarterfinals, retired due to a left foot inflammation)
6. (Bulgaria) Magdalena Maleeva (quarterfinals)
7. (Luxembourg) Anne Kremer (second round)
8. (Slovakia) Daniela Hantuchová (second round)

== Draw ==
Key

- Q = Qualifier
- WC = Wild card
- LL = Lucky loser
- Alt = Alternate
- ITF = ITF entry
- PR = Protected ranking
- SR = Special ranking
- SE = Special exempt
- JE = Junior exempt
- JR = Junior Accelerator Programme entrant
- CO = College Accelerator Programme entrant
- NG = Next Gen Accelerator Program entrant
- w/o = Walkover
- r = Retired
- d = Defaulted

=== Finals ===
Semifinals
1	(United States) Venus Williams	7^{7}	6
3	(France) Amélie Mauresmo	6^{4}	0
(Switzerland) Patty Schnyder	6	3	4
2	(Belgium) Justine Henin	1	6	6

Finals
1	(United States) Venus Williams	6	5	6
2	(Belgium) Justine Henin	3	7	3

=== Top half ===
First round
(Russia) A Kournikova	6	6
(Germany) M Weingärtner	2	1
Q	(Switzerland) MG Mikaelian	6	3	6
(France) N Dechy	4	6	4
(Spain) M Marrero	1	2
5	(Italy) S Farina Elia	6	6
(Paraguay) R de los Ríos	6^{3}	6	5
Q	(Hungary) Z Gubacsi	7^{7}	3	7
(Czech Republic) D Bedáňová	6^{4}	6	7^{7}
(United States) L Osterloh	7^{7}	4	6^{5}
(Spain) C Torrens Valero	3	2
8	(Slovakia) D Hantuchová	6	6

Second round
1	(United States) V Williams	7	6
(Russia) A Kournikova	5	0
Q	(Switzerland) MG Mikaelian	6	5	2
5	(Italy) S Farina Elia	3	7	6
3	(France) A Mauresmo	6	6
Q	(Hungary) Z Gubacsi	3	3
(Czech Republic) D Bedáňová	3	7^{7}	6
8	(Slovakia) D Hantuchová	6	6^{5}	4

Quarterfinals
1	(United States) V Williams	6	0
5	(Italy) S Farina Elia	3	1^{r}
3	(France) A Mauresmo	6	7
(Czech Republic) D Bedáňová	4	5

Semifinals
1	(United States) V Williams	7^{7}	6
3	(France) A Mauresmo	6^{4}	0

=== Bottom half ===
First round
7	(Luxembourg) A Kremer	6	6
(Italy) F Schiavone	4	1
Q	(Denmark) E Dyrberg	3	6	6
(South Africa) J Kruger	6	1	3
WC	(Belgium) E Clijsters	3	6^{5}
(Switzerland) P Schnyder	6	7^{7}
6	(Bulgaria) M Maleeva	6	6
(Slovakia) M Suchá	1	1
(Russia) E Bovina	4	6	5
(United States) M Tu	6	3	7
Q	(Germany) A Barna	5	6^{10}
WC	(Belgium) E Callens	7	7^{12}

Second round
7	(Luxembourg) A Kremer	6^{5}	6^{11}
Q	(Denmark) E Dyrberg	7^{7}	7^{13}
(Switzerland) P Schnyder	4	6	1
4	(Federal Republic of Yugoslavia) J Dokic	6	4	1^{r}
6	(Bulgaria) M Maleeva	6	6
(United States) M Tu	4	3
WC	(Belgium) E Callens	1	4
2	(Belgium) J Henin	6	6

Quarterfinals
Q	(Denmark) E Dyrberg	6	3	6^{3}
(Switzerland) P Schnyder	4	6	7^{7}
6	(Bulgaria) M Maleeva	6^{1}	1
2	(Belgium) J Henin	7^{7}	6

Semifinals
(Switzerland) P Schnyder	6	3	4
2	(Belgium) J Henin	1	6	6
