= 1998 Prokom Polish Open – Doubles =

Doubles
- 1998 Prokom Polish Open

Final
- Champions: (Czech Republic) Květa Hrdličková (Czech Republic) Helena Vildová
- Runners-up: (Sweden) Åsa Carlsson (Netherlands) Seda Noorlander
- Score: 6–3, 6–2

Details
- Draw: 16
- Seeds: 4

Events
Singles	Doubles
Prokom Polish Open	· 1999 →

Květa Hrdličková and Helena Vildová won in the final 6–3, 6–2 against Åsa Carlsson and Seda Noorlander.

== Seeds ==
Champion seeds are indicated in bold text while text in italics indicates the round in which those seeds were eliminated.

1. (Hungary) Virág Csurgó / (Italy) Laura Golarsa (withdrew)
2. (Bulgaria) Svetlana Krivencheva / (Czech Republic) Petra Langrová (quarterfinals)
3. (Germany) Barbara Rittner / (Germany) Elena Wagner (quarterfinals)
4. (Poland) Aleksandra Olsza / (Germany) Caroline Schneider (first round)

== Draw ==
=== Key ===
- Q = Qualifier
- WC = Wild card
- LL = Lucky loser
- Alt = Alternate
- ITF = ITF entry
- PR = Protected ranking
- SR = Special ranking
- SE = Special exempt
- JE = Junior exempt
- JR = Junior Accelerator Programme entrant
- CO = College Accelerator Programme entrant
- NG = Next Gen Accelerator Program entrant
- w/o = Walkover
- r = Retired
- d = Defaulted

First round
LL	(Czech Republic) B Kumbárová (Poland) S Rynarzewska	3	4
Q	(France) **K Jagieniak** (France) **S Pitkowski**	**6**	**6**
(Argentina) G Aizenberg (Spain) M Ramón Climent	3	2
(Italy) **S Cecchini** (Italy) **F Perfetti**	**6**	**6**
4	(Poland) A Olsza (Germany) C Schneider	0	**7**	0
(Sweden) **Å Carlsson** (Netherlands) **S Noorlander**	**6**	5	**6**
(Czech Republic) **H Šromová** (Poland) **A Żarska**	**7**	**6**
(Czech Republic) L Němečková (Slovakia) K Studeníková	5	4
(Czech Republic) J Pospíšilová (Czech Republic) A Vašková	2	1
(Czech Republic) **K Hrdličková** (Czech Republic) **H Vildová**	**6**	**6**
(Germany) S Schmidle (Germany) M Weingärtner	**7**	3	1
3	(Germany) **B Rittner** (Germany) **E Wagner**	5	**6**	**6**
(Spain) **G León García** (Spain) **C Torrens Valero**	2	**6**	**7**
WC	(Poland) M Feistel (Poland) K Teodorowicz	**6**	1	5
(United States) R Jensen (Australia) D Jones	3	4
2	(Bulgaria) **S Krivencheva** (Czech Republic) **P Langrová**	**6**	**6**

Quarterfinals
Q	(France) **K Jagieniak** (France) **S Pitkowski**	2	**7**	**6**
(Italy) S Cecchini (Italy) F Perfetti	**6**	6	4
(Sweden) **Å Carlsson** (Netherlands) **S Noorlander**	**6**	6	**6**
(Czech Republic) H Šromová (Poland) A Żarska	3	**7**	1
(Czech Republic) **K Hrdličková** (Czech Republic) **H Vildová**	2	**7**	**6**
3	(Germany) B Rittner (Germany) E Wagner	**6**	5	3
(Spain) **G León García** (Spain) **C Torrens Valero**	**7**	**6**
2	(Bulgaria) S Krivencheva (Czech Republic) P Langrová	6	2

Semifinals
Q	(France) K Jagieniak (France) S Pitkowski	2	4
(Sweden) **Å Carlsson** (Netherlands) **S Noorlander**	**6**	**6**
(Czech Republic) **K Hrdličková** (Czech Republic) **H Vildová**	**6**	**6**
(Spain) G León García (Spain) C Torrens Valero	3	1

Final
(Sweden) Åsa Carlsson (Netherlands) Seda Noorlander	3	2
(Czech Republic) **Květa Hrdličková** (Czech Republic) **Helena Vildová**	**6**	**6**
