= 2003 Proximus Diamond Games =

- Date: 10-16 February
- Edition: 2nd
- Category: Tier II
- Draw: 28S / 16D
- Prize money: $585,000
- Surface: Carpet / indoor
- Location: Antwerp, Belgium
- Venue: Sportpaleis

Champions

Singles
- (United States) Venus Williams

Doubles
- (Belgium) Kim Clijsters / (Japan) Ai Sugiyama
← 2002 ·	Proximus Diamond Games	· 2004 →

The 2003 Proximus Diamond Games was a women's professional tennis tournament played on indoor s at the Sportpaleis in Antwerp, Belgium that was part of the Tier II category of the 2003 WTA Tour. It was the second edition of the tournament and was held from 10 February until 16 February 2002. First-seeded Venus Williams won her second consecutive singles title at the event and earned $93,000 first-prize money.

== Finals ==
=== Singles ===
(United States) Venus Williams defeated (Belgium) Kim Clijsters, 6–2, 6–4

=== Doubles ===
(Belgium) Kim Clijsters / (Japan) Ai Sugiyama defeated (France) Nathalie Dechy / (France) Émilie Loit, 6–2, 6–0
