= 2004 Proximus Diamond Games =

Tennis tournament

- Date: 16–22 February
- Edition: 3rd
- Category: Tier II
- Draw: 28S / 16D
- Prize money: $585,000
- Surface: Carpet / indoor
- Location: Antwerp, Belgium
- Venue: Sportpaleis

Champions

Singles
- (Belgium) Kim Clijsters

Doubles
- (Zimbabwe) Cara Black / (Belgium) Els Callens
← 2003 ·	Proximus Diamond Games	· 2005 →

The 2004 Proximus Diamond Games was a women's professional tennis tournament played on indoor carpet courts at the Sportpaleis in Antwerp, Belgium that was part of the Tier II category of the 2004 WTA Tour. It was the third edition of the tournament and was held from 16 February until 22 February 2002. First-seeded Kim Clijsters won the singles title and earned $93,000 first-prize money.

== Finals ==
=== Singles ===
(Belgium) Kim Clijsters defeated (Italy) Silvia Farina Elia, 6–3, 6–0

=== Doubles ===
(Zimbabwe) Cara Black / (Belgium) Els Callens defeated (Switzerland) Myriam Casanova / (Greece) Eleni Daniilidou, 6–2, 6–1
