= 2004 Proximus Diamond Games – Singles =

Singles
- 2004 Proximus Diamond Games

Final
- Champion: (Belgium) Kim Clijsters
- Runner-up: (Italy) Silvia Farina Elia
- Score: 6–3, 6–0

Events
Singles	Doubles
- Diamond Games

Venus Williams was the defending champion, but did not compete this year.

Kim Clijsters won the title by defeating Silvia Farina Elia 6–3, 6–0 in the final.

== Seeds ==
Two out of the first five seeds (plus two lucky losers) received a bye into the second round.

1. (Belgium) Justine Henin-Hardenne (withdrew)
2. (Belgium) Kim Clijsters (champion)
3. (United States) Venus Williams (withdrew)
4. (Russia) Elena Dementieva (withdrew)
5. (Switzerland) Patty Schnyder (quarterfinals)
6. (Italy) Francesca Schiavone (withdrew)
7. (Israel) Anna Smashnova-Pistolesi (first round)
8. (Italy) Silvia Farina Elia (final)
9. (Bulgaria) Magdalena Maleeva (quarterfinals)
10. (Spain) Magüi Serna (first round)

== Draw ==
Key

- Q = Qualifier
- WC = Wild card
- LL = Lucky loser
- Alt = Alternate
- ITF = ITF entry
- PR = Protected ranking
- SR = Special ranking
- SE = Special exempt
- JE = Junior exempt
- JR = Junior Accelerator Programme entrant
- CO = College Accelerator Programme entrant
- NG = Next Gen Accelerator Program entrant
- w/o = Walkover
- r = Retired
- d = Defaulted

=== Finals ===
Semifinals
(Croatia) Karolina Šprem	4	5
8	(Italy) Silvia Farina Elia	6	7
LL	(Switzerland) Myriam Casanova	1	2
2	(Belgium) Kim Clijsters	6	6

Final
8	(Italy) Silvia Farina Elia	3	0
2	(Belgium) Kim Clijsters	6	6

=== Top half ===
First round
(Czech Republic) D Chládková	6	6
(Switzerland) E Gagliardi	0	0
(Zimbabwe) C Black	6	4	6
Q	(Czech Republic) Z Ondrášková	4	6	3
(Croatia) K Šprem	6	7
7	(Israel) A Smashnova-Pistolesi	1	5
Q	(United States) A Stevenson	3	1
LL	(Ukraine) J Vakulenko	6	6
WC	(Belgium) E Callens	6	7^{7}
(France) É Loit	1	6^{3}
(Spain) M Sánchez Lorenzo	3	0
8	(Italy) S Farina Elia	6	6

Second round
LL	(France) S Foretz	7^{7}	4	4
(Czech Republic) D Chládková	6^{2}	6	6
(Zimbabwe) C Black	4	3
(Croatia) K Šprem	6	6
5	(Switzerland) P Schnyder	6^{5}	6	7
LL	(Ukraine) J Vakulenko	7^{7}	4	5
WC	(Belgium) E Callens	6	2	1
8	(Italy) S Farina Elia	3	6	6

Quarterfinals
(Czech Republic) D Chládková	4	3
(Croatia) K Šprem	6	6
5	(Switzerland) P Schnyder	6^{6}	0^{r}
8	(Italy) S Farina Elia	7^{8}	1

Semifinals
(Croatia) K Šprem	4	5
8	(Italy) S Farina Elia	6	7

=== Bottom half ===
First round
10	(Spain) M Serna	4	2
Q	(Czech Republic) K Koukalová	6	6
(Russia) D Safina	6	6
(Germany) A Barna	4	4
(Slovenia) T Pisnik	6	3	6
(Hungary) P Mandula	1	6	2
9	(Bulgaria) M Maleeva	6	6
(France) M Pierce	4	4
Q	(Czech Republic) I Benešová	7	6
(Greece) E Daniilidou	5	4
LL	(Spain) A Parra Santonja	6	6
WC	(Belgium) E Clijsters	3	2

Second round
(Czech Republic) K Koukalová	6	7^{7}
(Russia) D Safina	4	6^{2}
(Slovenia) T Pisnik	1	7^{7}	4
LL	(Switzerland) M Casanova	6	6^{4}	6
9	(Bulgaria) M Maleeva	6	6
Q	(Czech Republic) I Benešová	4	4
LL	(Spain) A Parra Santonja	3	2
2	(Belgium) K Clijsters	6	6

Quarterfinals
(Czech Republic) K Koukalová	6	3	4
LL	(Switzerland) M Casanova	4	6	6
9	(Bulgaria) M Maleeva	6^{2}	2
2	(Belgium) K Clijsters	7^{7}	6

Semifinals
LL	(Switzerland) M Casanova	1	2
2	(Belgium) K Clijsters	6	6
