= Silvia Ramón-Cortés =

Spanish tennis player (born 1972)

Silvia Ramón Cortés
- Full name: Silvia Ramón Cortés Montaner
- Country (sports): Spain
- Born: 9 August 1972 (age 52); Barcelona, Spain
- Height: 1.61 m (5 ft 3 in)
- Plays: Right-handed
- Prize money: $78,764

Singles
- Career record: 105–95
- Career titles: 3 ITF
- Highest ranking: No. 125 (19 June 1995)

Doubles
- Career record: 56–43
- Career titles: 3 ITF
- Highest ranking: No. 147 (1 May 1995)

Silvia Ramón-Cortés Montaner (born 9 August 1972) is a former professional tennis player from Spain.

== Biography ==
A right-handed player from Barcelona, Ramón-Cortés represented the Spanish national team as a junior and was runner-up to countrywoman Pilar Pérez in the 1990 Orange Bowl.

Ramón-Cortés reached a highest singles ranking of 125 on the professional tour. Her biggest title win was a $25k tournament in Vigo in 1994. On the WTA Tour, she was a quarterfinalist at the 1995 Styrian Open and also made the round of 16 that year at Amelia Island, beating world No. 39, Miriam Oremans en route.

She retired from pro circuit in 1996 and now works as a communications consultant.

== ITF Circuit finals ==
=== Singles: 3 (3–0) ===
Legend
$50,000 tournaments
$25,000 tournaments
$10,000 tournaments

| Result | No. | Date | Tournament | Surface | Opponent | Score |
|---|---|---|---|---|---|---|
| Win | 1. | 23 July 1990 | ITF La Coruña, Spain | Clay | (Netherlands) Stephanie Rottier | 7–5, 6–3 |
| Win | 2. | 5 November 1990 | ITF Lerida, Spain | Hard | (Spain) Pilar Pérez | 6–3, 6–4 |
| Win | 3. | 11 July 1994 | ITF Vigo, Spain | Hard | (Spain) Noelia Pérez Peñate | 6–3, 6–1 |

=== Doubles: 10 (3–7) ===
| Result | No. | Date | Tournament | Surface | Partner | Opponents | Score |
|---|---|---|---|---|---|---|---|
| Loss | 1. | 16 April 1990 | ITF Marsa, Malta | Clay | (Spain) Eva Bes | (Soviet Union) Viktoria Milvidskaia (Soviet Union) Anna Mirza | 2–6, 6–7 |
| Loss | 2. | 5 November 1990 | ITF Lerida, Spain | Hard | (Spain) Ana Larrakoetxea | (Spain) Eva Bes (Spain) Virginia Ruano Pascual | 2–6, 6–1, 5–7 |
| Win | 3. | 18 March 1991 | ITF Alicante, Spain | Clay | (Spain) Rosa Bielsa | (Spain) Eva Bes (Spain) Virginia Ruano Pascual | 6–3, 0–6, 7–5 |
| Win | 4. | 25 November 1991 | ITF Porto Alegre, Brazil | Clay | (France) Sybille Niox-Château | (Brazil) Luciana Corsato-Owsianka (Brazil) Andrea Vieira | 6–4, 6–3 |
| Loss | 5. | 15 March 1993 | ITF Zaragoza, Spain | Hard | (Spain) Gala León García | (Czech Republic) Dominika Gorecká (Czech Republic) Lenka Němečková | 4–6, 1–6 |
| Loss | 6. | 19 July 1993 | ITF Bilbao, Spain | Clay | (Spain) Inmaculada Varas | (Argentina) Maria Fernanda Landa (Portugal) Sofia Prazeres | 4–6, 4–6 |
| Win | 7. | 23 May 1994 | ITF Barcelona, Spain | Clay | (Spain) Eva Bes | (Netherlands) Maaike Koutstaal (Australia) Kirrily Sharpe | 6–1, 6–3 |
| Loss | 8. | 13 June 1994 | ITF Sezze, Italy | Clay | (Argentina) Laura Montalvo | (Italy) Laura Garrone (Italy) Rita Grande | 4–6, 4–6 |
| Loss | 9. | 1 August 1994 | ITF Munich, Germany | Clay | (Spain) Cristina Torrens Valero | (Italy) Carin Bakkum (Czech Republic) Helena Vildová | 6–7, 0–6 |
| Loss | 10. | 12 June 1995 | ITF Barcelona, Spain | Clay | (Argentina) Laura Montalvo | (Spain) Patricia Aznar (Spain) Eva Bes | 3–6, 6–2, 4–6 |
