= 1995 Styrian Open =

- Date: 24–30 July
- Edition: 23rd
- Category: Tier IV
- Draw: 32S / 16D
- Surface: Clay / outdoor
- Location: Maria Lankowitz, Austria
- Venue: Sportpark Piberstein

Champions

Singles
- (Austria) Judith Wiesner

Doubles
- (Italy) Silvia Farina / (Hungary) Andrea Temesvári
- WTA Austrian Open

The 1995 Styrian Open was a women's tennis tournament played on outdoor clay courts at the Sportpark Piberstein in Maria Lankowitz, Austria that was part of Tier IV of the 1995 WTA Tour. It was the 23rd edition of the tournament and was held from 24 July until 30 July 1995. First-seeded Judith Wiesner won the singles title and earned $17,500 first-prize money.

== Finals ==
=== Singles ===
(Austria) Judith Wiesner defeated (Romania) Ruxandra Dragomir 7–6, 6–3

- It was Wiesner's only singles title of the year and the 5th of her career.

=== Doubles ===
(Italy) Silvia Farina / (Hungary) Andrea Temesvári defeated (France) Alexandra Fusai / (Germany) Wiltrud Probst 6–2, 6–2

- It was Farina's only title of the year and the 1st of her career. It was Temesvári's only title of the year and the 11th of her career.
