= Katalin Miskolczi =

Hungarian tennis player

- Country (sports): Hungary
- Born: 6 August 1976 (age 48)
- Prize money: $40,567

Singles
- Career record: 144–145
- Career titles: 2 ITF
- Highest ranking: No. 221 (7 April 1997)

Doubles
- Career record: 37–50
- Career titles: 1 ITF
- Highest ranking: No. 338 (24 July 2000)

Katalin Miskolczi (born 6 August 1976) is a Hungarian former professional tennis player.

Miskolczi had a career-high singles ranking of 221, and won two ITF titles, both in 1995. At WTA Tour level, her best performance came when she qualified for the main draw of the 1996 Meta Styrian Open and had a first round win over Anna Smashnova.

== ITF finals ==
=== Singles (2–3) ===
Result	No.	Date	Location	Surface	Opponent	Score
Win	1.	23 January 1995	Båstad, Sweden	Hard	(Switzerland) Miroslava Vavrinec	1–6, 6–2, 7–5
Win	2.	5 June 1995	Dublin, Ireland	Clay	(Australia) Robyn Mawdsley	6–2, 6–2
Loss	1.	29 October 1997	Joué-lès-Tours, France	Hard	(Poland) Katarzyna Nowak	1–6, 2–6
Loss	2.	17 August 1998	Maribor, Slovenia	Clay	(Hungary) Adrienn Hegedűs	5–7, 2–6
Loss	3.	27 September 1999	Fiumicino, Italy	Clay	(Czech Republic) Olga Vymetálková	2–6, 4–6

=== Doubles (1–3) ===
Result	No.	Date	Location	Surface	Partner	Opponents	Score
Loss	1.	16 November 1998	Biel, Switzerland	Hard	(Germany) Gréta Arn	(Czech Republic) Dája Bedáňová (Germany) Lydia Steinbach	2–6, 1–6
Win	1.	27 June 1999	Velp, Netherlands	Clay	(Netherlands) Natasha Galouza	(Australia) Evie Dominikovic (Netherlands) Jolanda Mens	6–3, 7–5
Loss	2.	27 September 1999	Fiumicino, Italy	Clay	(Austria) Stefanie Haidner	(Czech Republic) Olga Vymetálková (Czech Republic) Gabriela Navrátilová	3–6, 3–6
Loss	3.	26 June 2000	Velp, Netherlands	Clay	(Germany) Camilla Kremer	(Australia) Jenny Belobrajdic (Australia) Kristen van Elden	1–6, 2–6
