= Niki Ninaus =

Australian tennis player

- Country (sports): Austria; Australia
- Born: February 22, 1974 (age 51)

Singles
- Highest ranking: No 741 (24 May 1999)

Doubles
- Highest ranking: No. 490 (19 Apr 1999)

Niki Ninaus (born 22 February 1974) is an Australian former professional tennis player of Austrian descent.

Ninaus, who grew up in Sydney, is the daughter of Austrian-born football player Herbert Ninaus. Her father was a member of the Austrian squad for the 1958 FIFA World Cup and played for Australia's "B" team after emigrating.

Active on the professional tour in the 1990s, Ninaus made a WTA Tour singles main draw appearance as a wildcard at the 1996 Meta Styrian Open, held in Austria. She had best career rankings of 741 in singles and 490 in doubles.
