= Elisabeth Habeler =

Austrian tennis player

- Country (sports): Austria
- Born: 18 November 1974 (age 50)
- Prize money: $23,456

Singles
- Career record: 55–56
- Career titles: 1 ITF
- Highest ranking: No. 241 (11 September 1995)

Grand Slam singles results
- Wimbledon: Q1 (1996)

Doubles
- Career record: 19–25
- Career titles: 2 ITF
- Highest ranking: No. 212 (14 July 1997)

Elisabeth Habeler (born 18 November 1974) is an Austrian former professional tennis player.

Habeler reached a best singles ranking on tour of 241 in the world and won an ITF title in Katowice in 1994. She played in the qualifiers for the 1996 Wimbledon Championships.

Her WTA Tour main-draw appearances came as a doubles player and included two quarterfinals, at Palermo in 1996 and Warsaw in 1997.

== ITF finals ==
$25,000 tournaments
$10,000 tournaments

=== Singles (1–0) ===
Result	Date	Tournament	Surface	Opponent	Score
Win	16 May 1994	Katowice, Poland	Clay	(Czech Republic) Lenka Cenková	6–1, 6–4

=== Doubles (2–0) ===
Result	Date	Tournament	Surface	Partner	Opponents	Score
Win	15 August 1994	Bergisch Gladbach, Germany	Clay	(Germany) Sabine Gerke	(South Africa) Nannie de Villiers (Colombia) Carmiña Giraldo	6–3, 6–2
Win	22 July 1996	Rostock, Germany	Clay	(Poland) Katarzyna Teodorowicz-Lisowska	(Czech Republic) Denisa Chládková (Czech Republic) Eva Martincová	6–4, 4–6, 6–1
