= 1996 Meta Styrian Open =

- Date: 5–11 August
- Edition: 24th
- Category: Tier IV
- Draw: 32S / 16D
- Prize money: $107,500
- Surface: Clay / outdoor
- Location: Maria Lankowitz, Austria

Champions

Singles
- (Austria) Barbara Paulus

Doubles
- (Slovakia) Janette Husárová / (Ukraine) Natalia Medvedeva
- WTA Austrian Open

The 1996 Meta Styrian Open was a tennis tournament played on outdoor clay courts at the Sportpark Piberstein in Maria Lankowitz in Austria that was part of Tier IV of the 1996 WTA Tour. It was the 24th edition of the tournament was held from 5 August until 11 August 1996. First-seeded Barbara Paulus won the singles title.

== Finals ==
=== Singles ===
(Austria) Barbara Paulus defeated (Italy) Sandra Cecchini (Cecchini retired)

- It was Paulus' only title of the year and the 6th of her career.

=== Doubles ===
(Slovakia) Janette Husárová / (Ukraine) Natalia Medvedeva defeated (Czech Republic) Lenka Cenková / (Czech Republic) Kateřina Kroupová 6–4, 7–5

- It was Husárová's 2nd title of the year and the 2nd of her career. It was Medvedeva's 1st title of the year and the 15th of her career.
