= Lenka Cenková =

Czech tennis player

- Country (sports): Czech Republic
- Born: 24 January 1977 (age 48); Třinec, Czechoslovakia
- Height: 1.75 m (5 ft 9 in)
- Turned pro: 1992
- Retired: 2002
- Plays: Right-handed (two-handed backhand)
- Prize money: $140,669

Singles
- Career record: 148–114
- Career titles: 4 ITF
- Highest ranking: No. 95 (13 January 1997)

Grand Slam singles results
- Australian Open: 1R (1997)
- French Open: 1R (1997)
- Wimbledon: Q1 (1997, 1998)
- US Open: Q1 (1995, 1996, 1997, 1998, 1999)

Doubles
- Career record: 91–51
- Career titles: 9 ITF
- Highest ranking: No. 105 (11 November 1996)

Grand Slam doubles results
- Australian Open: 1R (1997)
- Wimbledon: Q3 (1997)
- US Open: 2R (1996)

Lenka Cenková (born 24 January 1977) is a former professional Czech tennis player.

== Career ==
=== Singles ===
In 1996, she achieved her best WTA Tour result by reaching the semifinals at the ECM Prague Open held at Karlovy Vary. She lost the semifinal match to Patty Schnyder in a third-set tiebreak. She also reached the quarterfinals at the 1996 Austrian Open held at Maria Lankowitz, beating the No. 2 seed, Judith Wiesner in the first round, and eventually losing to Sandra Cecchini in three sets.

In 1997, Cenková played in her first Grand Slam singles draws at the Australian Open and French Open, losing in the first round of both to Meilen Tu and Brenda Schultz-McCarthy, respectively. She did, however, reach the quarterfinals at the Hobart International in Australia, after wins over Barbara Rittner and Florencia Labat, succumbing to Dominique Van Roost in the quarterfinals in straight sets. Van Roost eventually went on to win the tournament.

She also played at the Birmingham Classic in 1997, losing in the second round to Magdalena Maleeva.

=== Doubles ===
She managed to reach a WTA Tour doubles final at the 1996 Austrian Open with Kateřina Kroupová-Šišková. She also reached the second round at the 1996 US Open.

== WTA career finals ==
=== Doubles: 1 (runner-up) ===
Result	Date	Tournament	Tier	Surface	Partner	Opponents	Score
Loss	11 August 1996	Austrian Open	Tier IV	Clay	(Czech Republic) Kateřina Šišková	(Ukraine) Natalia Medvedeva (Slovakia) Janette Husárová	4–6, 5–7

== ITF finals ==
$75,000 tournaments
$50,000 tournaments
$25,000 tournaments
$10,000 tournaments

=== Singles: 9 (4–5) ===
Result	No.	Date	Tournament	Surface	Opponent	Score
Loss	1.	11 October 1993	ITF Burgdorf, Switzerland	Carpet (i)	(Netherlands) Kim de Weille	2–6, 1–6
Loss	2.	16 May 1994	ITF Katowice, Poland	Clay	(Austria) Elisabeth Habeler	1–6, 4–6
Loss	3.	13 June 1994	ITF Prostějov, Czech Republic	Clay	(Georgia (country)) Nino Louarsabishvili	2–6, 0–6
Win	4.	31 October 1994	ITF Nicosia, Cyprus	Clay	(Hungary) Kira Nagy	2–6, 3–6
Win	5.	11 December 1994	ITF Vítkovice, Czech Republic	Hard (i)	(Czech Republic) Alena Vašková	6–4, 5–7, 6–4
Win	6.	9 July 1995	ITF Stuttgart, Germany	Clay	(Germany) Julia Jehs	6–4, 6–1
Win	7.	5 May 1996	ITF Szczecin, Poland	Clay	(Spain) Cristina Torrens Valero	6–2, 6–4
Loss	8.	8 September 1997	ITF Samara, Russia	Carpet (i)	(Russia) Tatiana Panova	0–6, 2–6
Loss	9.	26 July 1999	ITF Les Contamines, France	Hard	(Germany) Adriana Barna	6–7, 2–6

=== Doubles: 19 (9–10) ===
Result	No.	Date	Tournament	Surface	Partner	Opponents	Score
Win	1.	11 October 1993	ITF Burgdorf, Switzerland	Hard	(Czech Republic) Alena Vašková	(Switzerland) Geraldine Dondit (Switzerland) Natalie Tschan	1–6, 6–4, 6–3
Win	2.	16 May 1994	ITF Katowice, Poland	Clay	(Czech Republic) Alena Vašková	(Slovakia) Nora Kovařčíková (Slovakia) Zuzana Nemšáková	w/o
Loss	3.	13 June 1994	ITF Prostějov, Czech Republic	Clay	(Czech Republic) Alena Vašková	(Czech Republic) Martina Hautová (Czech Republic) Monika Kratochvílová	4–6, 2–6
Win	4.	10 October 1994	ITF Burgdorf, Switzerland	Carpet (i)	(Czech Republic) Adriana Gerši	(Israel) Ilana Berger (Israel) Tzipora Obziler	4–6, 6–3, 6–4
Win	5.	31 October 1994	ITF Nicosia, Cyprus	Clay	(Czech Republic) Gabriela Netíková	(Hungary) Kati Kocsis (Bulgaria) Borislava Tzvetkova	6–2, 6–4
Loss	6.	6 May 1996	ITF Szczecin, Poland	Clay	(Czech Republic) Adriana Gerši	(Ukraine) Elena Brioukhovets (Ukraine) Elena Tatarkova	2–6, 1–6
Win	7.	7 July 1996	ITF Vaihingen, Germany	Clay	(Czech Republic) Adriana Gerši	(Netherlands) Amanda Hopmans (Netherlands) Seda Noorlander	6–2, 3–6, ret.
Loss	8.	21 July 1996	ITF Darmstadt, Germany	Clay	(Czech Republic) Pavlína Rajzlová	(Germany) Adriana Barna (Germany) Anca Barna	6–4, 3–6, 3–6
Win	9.	4 October 1997	ITF Otočec, Slovenia	Clay	(Czech Republic) Kateřina Šišková	(Hungary) Petra Mandula (Hungary) Katalin Marosi	7–5, 7–6^{(3)}
Loss	10.	19 October 1997	ITF Southampton, England	Carpet (i)	(Serbia and Montenegro) Sandra Načuk	(United Kingdom) Julie Pullin (United Kingdom) Lorna Woodroffe	2–6, 1–6
Win	11.	26 April 1998	ITF Prostějov, Czech Republic	Clay	(Czech Republic) Kateřina Šišková	(Ukraine) Olga Lugina (Germany) Elena Wagner	6–4, 4–6, 6–4
Loss	12.	21 September 1998	ITF Bucharest, Romania	Clay	(Austria) Karin Kschwendt	(Spain) Eva Bes (Spain) Rosa María Andrés Rodríguez	6–4, 6–7^{(6)}, 0–6
Win	13.	25 October 1998	ITF Joué-lès-Tours, France	Hard (i)	(Czech Republic) Eva Martincová	(France) Amélie Cocheteux (France) Émilie Loit	3–6, 6–4, 7–5
Win	14.	5 December 1998	ITF New Delhi, India	Hard	(Netherlands) Amanda Hopmans	(Slovenia) Tina Križan (Austria) Karin Kschwendt	w/o
Loss	15.	21 June 1999	ITF Sopot, Poland	Clay	(Belarus) Nadejda Ostrovskaya	(Romania) Magda Mihalache (Slovakia) Zuzana Váleková	2–6, 4–6
Loss	16.	25 July 1999	ITF Valladolid, Spain	Hard	(Germany) Meike Fröhlich	(Netherlands) Debby Haak (Netherlands) Andrea van den Hurk	6–2, 3–6, 6–7
Loss	17.	11 October 1999	ITF Rhodes, Greece	Clay	(Spain) Alicia Ortuño	(Italy) Tathiana Garbin (Netherlands) Amanda Hopmans	6–4, 0–6, 6–7^{(3)}
Loss	18.	28 January 2001	ITF Båstad, Sweden	Hard (i)	(Germany) Adriana Jerabek	(Czech Republic) Blanka Kumbárová (Czech Republic) Helena Vildová	1–6, 3–6
Loss	19.	26 May 2001	ITF Guimarães, Portugal	Hard	(Czech Republic) Magdalena Zděnovcová	(Russia) Galina Fokina (Brazil) Vanessa Menga	2–6, 1–6
