= 1998 Piberstein Styrian Open =

- Date: 6–12 July
- Edition: 26th
- Category: Tier IV
- Draw: 32S / 16D
- Surface: Clay / outdoor
- Location: Maria Lankowitz, Austria
- Venue: Sportpark Piberstein

Champions

Singles
- (Switzerland) Patty Schnyder

Doubles
- (Argentina) Laura Montalvo / (Argentina) Paola Suárez
- WTA Austrian Open

The 1998 Piberstein Styrian Open was a women's tennis tournament played on outdoor clay courts at the Sportpark Piberstein in Maria Lankowitz, Austria that was part of Tier IV of the 1998 WTA Tour. It was the 26th edition of the tournament and was held from 6 July until 12 July 1998. First-seeded Patty Schnyder won the singles title.

== Finals ==
=== Singles ===
(Switzerland) Patty Schnyder defeated (Spain) Gala León García 6–2, 4–6, 6–3

- It was Schnyder's 5th title of the year and the 5th of her career.

=== Doubles ===
(Argentina) Laura Montalvo / (Argentina) Paola Suárez defeated (Slovenia) Tina Križan / (Slovenia) Katarina Srebotnik 6–1, 6–2

- It was Montalvo's 2nd title of the year and the 4th of her career. It was Suárez's 6th title of the year and the 7th of her career.
