= Helena Vildová =

Czech tennis player

- Country (sports): Czech Republic
- Born: 19 March 1972 (age 54)
- Turned pro: 1989
- Retired: 2001
- Plays: Right-handed (two-handed backhand)
- Prize money: $197,156

Singles
- Career record: 159–140
- Career titles: 3 ITF
- Highest ranking: 188 (15 January 1996)

Doubles
- Career record: 239–140
- Career titles: 3 WTA, 28 ITF
- Highest ranking: 39 (3 November 1997)

Grand Slam doubles results
- Australian Open: 2R (1996, 1997, 1999)
- French Open: 2R (1995, 1998)
- Wimbledon: 1R (1995, 1996, 1997, 1998, 1999)
- US Open: 2R (1995, 1998)

Helena Vildová (born 19 March 1972) is a retired Czech tennis player.

In her career, she won three doubles titles on the WTA Tour. On 15 January 1996, she reached her best singles ranking of world No. 188. On 3 November 1997, she peaked at No. 39 in the WTA doubles rankings.

Vildová retired from professional tennis in 2001.

== WTA career finals ==
=== Doubles: 6 (3 titles, 3 runner-ups) ===
Legend
Grand Slam (0–0)
Tier I (0–0)
Tier II (0–0)
Tier III (1–1)
Tier IV & V (2–2)

Result	W/L	Date	Tournament	Surface	Partner	Opponents	Score
Loss	0–1	Feb 1997	Linz Open, Austria	Carpet	(Czech Republic) Eva Melicharová	(France) Alexandra Fusai (France) Nathalie Tauziat	6–4, 3–6, 1–6
Win	1–1	Jun 1997	Rosmalen Open, Netherlands	Grass	(Czech Republic) Eva Melicharová	(Slovakia) Karina Habšudová (Argentina) Florencia Labat	6–3, 7–6^{(8–6)}
Loss	1–2	Jul 1997	Prague Open, Czech Republic	Clay	(Czech Republic) Eva Martincová	(Slovakia) Ruxandra Dragomir (Slovakia) Karina Habšudová	1–6, 7–5, 2–6
Win	2–2	Aug 1997	Gastein Ladies, Austria	Clay	(Czech Republic) Eva Melicharová	(Czech Republic) Radka Bobková (Germany) Wiltrud Probst	6–2, 6–2
Win	3–2	Aug 1998	Warsaw Open, Poland	Clay	(Czech Republic) Květa Peschke	(Sweden) Åsa Carlsson (Netherlands) Seda Noorlander	6–3, 6–2
Loss	3–3.	Feb 1999	Nokia Cup, Czech Republic	Clay	(Czech Republic) Květa Peschke	(France) Alexandra Fusai (France) Nathalie Tauziat	6–3, 2–6, 1–6

== ITF Circuit finals ==
Legend
$100,000 tournaments
$75,000 tournaments
$50,000 tournaments
$25,000 tournaments
$10,000 tournaments

=== Singles: 6 (3–3) ===
Result	No.	Date	Tournament	Surface	Opponent	Score
Win	1.	26 November 1990	ITF Érd, Hungary	Clay	(Czechoslovakia) Klára Bláhová	6–2, 6–3
Loss	2.	5 February 1995	ITF Coburg, Germany	Hard (i)	(Finland) Nanne Dahlman	6–3, 3–6, 3–6
Win	3.	6 October 1996	ITF Langenthal, Switzerland	Carpet (i)	(Germany) Kerstin Taube	6–3, 3–6, 6–1
Loss	4.	7 April 1997	ITF Hvar, Croatia	Clay	(Czech Republic) Milena Nekvapilová	6–7^{(2)}, 4–6
Win	5.	5 October 1997	ITF Langenthal, Switzerland	Carpet (i)	(Germany) Gabriela Kučerová	6–3, 6–2
Loss	6.	30 January 2000	ITF Båstad, Sweden	Hard (i)	(Czech Republic) Magdalena Zděnovcová	3–6, 6–0, 4–6

=== Doubles: 44 (28–16) ===
Result	No.	Date	Tournament	Surface	Partner	Opponents	Score
Win	1.	23 April 1990	ITF Sutton, England	Clay	(Czechoslovakia) Radka Bobková	(Australia) Lisa Keller (Australia) Robyn Mawdsley	7–6^{(8)}, 6–3
Win	2.	17 September 1990	ITF Napoli, Italy	Hard	(Czechoslovakia) Lucie Ludvigová	(Spain) Marta Alastrue (Uruguay) Patricia Miller	3–6, 6–1, 6–0
Win	3.	24 September 1990	ITF Napoli, Italy	Clay	(Czechoslovakia) Lucie Ludvigová	(Czechoslovakia) Klára Bláhová (Switzerland) Natalie Tschan	6–3, 6–2
Loss	4.	26 November 1990	ITF Érd, Hungary	Clay	(Czechoslovakia) Lucie Ludvigová	(Poland) Magdalena Feistel (Poland) Katarzyna Teodorowicz	7–5, 4–6, 2–6
Loss	5.	8 April 1991	ITF Turin, Italy	Clay	(Czechoslovakia) Lucie Steflová	(Spain) Eva Bes (Spain) Virginia Ruano Pascual	7–6, 1–6, 3–6
Win	6.	20 May 1991	ITF Katowice, Poland	Clay	(Poland) Magdalena Feistel	(Czechoslovakia) Ivana Jankovská (Czechoslovakia) Eva Melicharová	6–4, 6–7^{(9)}, 6–0
Loss	7.	1 February 1993	ITF Newcastle, England	Carpet (i)	(Czechoslovakia) Pavlína Rajzlová	(Russia) Natalia Egorova (Russia) Svetlana Parkhomenko	4–6, 6–7, 0–6
Loss	8.	8 February 1993	ITF Sunderland, England	Carpet (i)	(Czech Republic) Pavlína Rajzlová	(Russia) Natalia Egorova (Russia) Svetlana Parkhomenko	6–2, 1–6, 6–7
Loss	9.	1 March 1993	ITF Cascais, Portugal	Clay	(Czech Republic) Pavlína Rajzlová	(Netherlands) Lara Bitter (Netherlands) Amy van Buuren	1–6, 6–2, 3–6
Loss	10.	20 September 1993	ITF Rabac, Croatia	Clay	(Czech Republic) Petra Holubová	(Czech Republic) Monika Kratochvílová (Czech Republic) Olga Hostáková	4–6, 4–6
Win	11.	27 September 1993	ITF Mali Lošinj, Croatia	Clay	(Poland) Aleksandra Olsza	(Croatia) Ivona Horvat (Slovenia) Tina Vukasovič	6–0, 6–7^{(5)}, 6–3
Win	12.	17 January 1994	ITF Turku, Finland	Carpet (i)	(Czech Republic) Radka Suraková	(Finland) Linda Jansson (Finland) Katrina Saarinen	7–5, 6–3
Win	13.	6 February 1994	ITF Coburg, Germany	Carpet (i)	(Poland) Katarzyna Teodorowicz	(Czech Republic) Ivana Jankovská (Czech Republic) Eva Melicharová	6–2, 7–6
Win	14.	15 May 1994	ITF Budapest, Hungary	Clay	(Czech Republic) Eva Melicharová	(Hungary) Virág Csurgó (Hungary) Andrea Temesvári	6–2, 6–4
Win	15.	1 August 1994	ITF Munich, Germany	Clay	(Netherlands) Carin Bakkum	(Spain) Silvia Ramón-Cortés (Spain) Cristina Torrens Valero	7–6^{(4)}, 6–0
Loss	16.	29 August 1994	ITF Maribor, Slovenia	Clay	(Poland) Katharzyna Teodorowicz	(Germany) Adriana Barna (Hungary) Andrea Noszály	7–5, 6–0
Win	17.	24 October 1994	ITF Poitiers, France	Hard (i)	(Czech Republic) Ludmila Richterová	(Serbia and Montenegro) Tatjana Ječmenica (Bulgaria) Svetlana Krivencheva	7–6, 6–1
Loss	18.	5 February 1995	ITF Coburg, Germany	Hard (i)	(Poland) Magdalena Feistel	(Netherlands) Seda Noorlander (Germany) Marlene Weingärtner	2–6, 7–6, 2–6
Win	19.	24 April 1995	ITF Budapest, Hungary	Clay	(Czech Republic) Eva Melicharová	(France) Alexandra Fusai (Australia) Kristin Godridge	6–3, 6–4
Win	20.	21 May 1995	ITF Bordeaux, France	Clay	(Netherlands) Seda Noorlander	(United States) Erika deLone (Australia) Nicole Pratt	6–3, 6–1
Loss	21.	17 July 1995	ITF Darmstadt, Germany	Clay	(Poland) Magdalena Feistel	(Bulgaria) Svetlana Krivencheva (Czech Republic) Květa Peschke	6–7^{(4)}, 2–6
Loss	22.	6 August 1995	ITF Budapest, Hungary	Clay	(Poland) Magdalena Feistel	(Serbia and Montenegro) Tatjana Ječmenica (Bulgaria) Svetlana Krivencheva	4–6, 3–6
Loss	23.	14 August 1995	ITF Maribor, Slovenia	Clay	(Czech Republic) Eva Melicharová	(Italy) Laura Garrone (Slovenia) Tina Križan	4–6, 6–3, 2–6
Win	24.	13 November 1995	ITF Bad Gögging, Germany	Carpet (i)	(Czech Republic) Eva Melicharová	(Czech Republic) Jana Macurová (Czech Republic) Olga Vymetálková	7–5, 6–3
Win	25.	3 December 1995	ITF Limoges, France	Hard (i)	(Czech Republic) Eva Melicharová	(Czech Republic) Eva Martincová (Bulgaria) Elena Pampoulova	6–3, 0–6, 6–4
Win	26.	4 March 1996	ITF Prostějov, Czech Republic	Hard (i)	(Czech Republic) Denisa Chládková	(Bulgaria) Svetlana Krivencheva (Ukraine) Olga Lugina	7–6^{(5)}, 4–6, 7–5
Win	27.	26 May 1996	ITF Novi Sad, Serbia	Clay	(Netherlands) Seda Noorlander	(Brazil) Miriam D'Agostini (Paraguay) Larissa Schaerer	4–6, 6–1, 6–1
Win	28.	11 August 1996	ITF Sopot, Poland	Clay	(Czech Republic) Lenka Němečková	(Germany) Kirstin Freye (Germany) Silke Meier	6–0, 6–0
Win	29.	25 August 1996	ITF Athens, Greece	Clay	(Romania) Cătălina Cristea	(France) Virginie Massart (Switzerland) Emanuela Zardo	6–2, 6–4
Win	30.	6 October 1996	ITF Langenthal, Switzerland	Carpet (i)	(Russia) Alina Jidkova	(Switzerland) Caecilia Charbonnier (Switzerland) Andrea Schwarz	6–4, 6–4
Win	31.	3 November 1996	ITF Stockholm, Sweden	Hard (i)	(Czech Republic) Sandra Kleinová	(Finland) Nanne Dahlman (Sweden) Maria Strandlund	7–5, 6–4
Loss	32.	31 March 1997	ITF Makarska, Croatia	Clay	(Hungary) Nóra Köves	(Russia) Evgenia Kulikovskaya (Germany) Caroline Schneider	1–6, 6–4, 4–6
Win	33.	5 October 1997	ITF Langenthal, Switzerland	Carpet (i)	(Germany) Magdalena Kučerová	(Switzerland) Diane Asensio (Switzerland) Angela Bürgis	7–5, 6–4
Loss	34.	5 April 1998	ITF Hvar, Croatia	Clay	(Bulgaria) Antoaneta Pandjerova	(Croatia) Jelena Kostanić Tošić (Slovenia) Katarina Srebotnik	5–7, 3–6
Win	35.	12 April 1998	ITF Dubrovnik, Croatia	Clay	(Czech Republic) Eva Melicharová	(Czech Republic) Blanka Kumbárová (Czech Republic) Michaela Paštiková	5–7, 6–4, 6–4
Win	36.	9 December 1998	ITF Titisee-Neustadt, Germany	Carpet (i)	(Czech Republic) Květa Peschke	(Germany) Anca Barna (Germany) Adriana Barna	6–4, 6–3
Win	37.	20 December 1998	ITF Průhonice, Czech Republic	Carpet (i)	(Czech Republic) Eva Melicharová	(Slovakia) Ľudmila Cervanová (Germany) Magdalena Kučerová	4–6, 6–3, 6–4
Loss	38.	15 November 1999	ITF Schlieren, Switzerland	Carpet (i)	(Czech Republic) Hana Šromová	(Czech Republic) Gabriela Chmelinová (Czech Republic) Olga Vymetálková	2–6, 6–4, 5–7
Win	39.	13 December 1999	ITF Průhonice, Czech Republic	Hard (i)	(Slovakia) Martina Suchá	(Belarus) Nadejda Ostrovskaya (Belarus) Tatiana Poutchek	6–3, 2–6, 6–2
Win	40.	29 January 2000	ITF Båstad, Sweden	Hard (i)	(Czech Republic) Magdalena Zděnovcová	(Sweden) Frida Engblom (Sweden) Erika Ohlsson	6–4, 6–2
Loss	41.	2 April 2000	ITF Quartu Sant'Elena, Italy	Clay	(Czech Republic) Michaela Paštiková	(Bulgaria) Svetlana Krivencheva (Bulgaria) Antoaneta Pandjerova	5–7, 6–7^{(7)}
Loss	42.	23 April 2000	ITF Prostějov, Czech Republic	Clay	(Czech Republic) Magdalena Zděnovcová	(Czech Republic) Michaela Paštiková (Germany) Jasmin Wöhr	6–3, 1–6, 6–7^{(10)}
Win	43.	3 September 2000	ITF Plzen, Czech Republic	Clay	(Czech Republic) Eva Krejčová	(Czech Republic) Gabriela Chmelinová (Czech Republic) Alena Vašková	5–3, 4–1, 4–2
Win	44.	28 January 2001	ITF Båstad, Sweden	Hard (i)	(Czech Republic) Blanka Kumbárová	(Czech Republic) Lenka Cenková (Germany) Adriana Jerabek	6–1, 6–3
