= Seda Noorlander =

Dutch tennis player

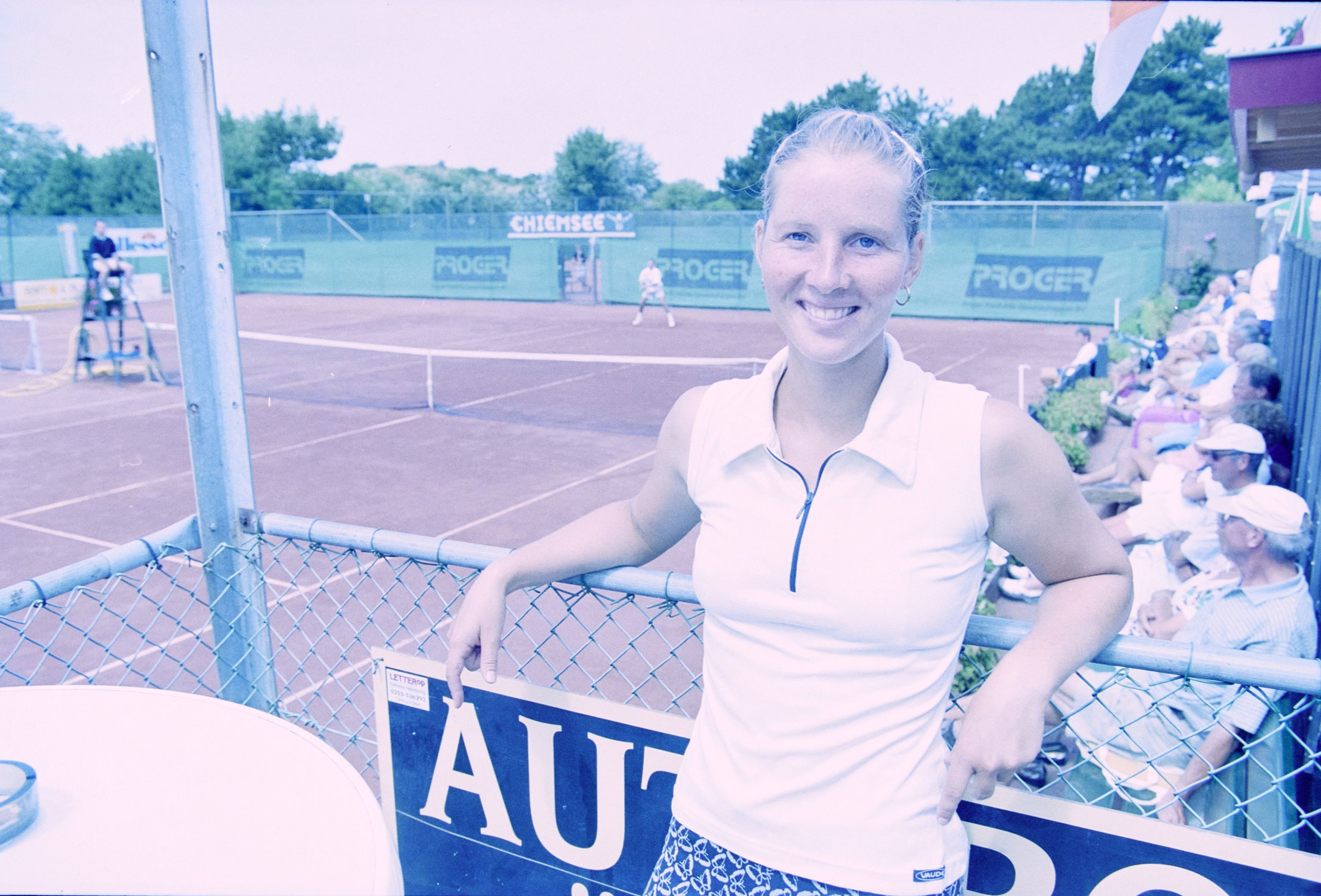
- Seda Noorlander, Z'voort 2001
- Country (sports): Netherlands
- Residence: The Hague, Netherlands
- Born: 22 May 1974 (age 52) The Hague
- Turned pro: 1993
- Retired: 2006
- Plays: Right (two-handed backhand)
- Prize money: $623,689

Singles
- Career record: 347–343
- Career titles: 0 WTA, 3 ITF
- Highest ranking: No. 80 (3 December 1999)

Grand Slam singles results
- Australian Open: 2R (1999)
- French Open: 1R (1999, 2000, 2002)
- Wimbledon: 3R (1999)
- US Open: 2R (1999)

Doubles
- Career record: 220–162
- Career titles: 1 WTA, 22 ITF
- Highest ranking: No. 47 (22 February 1999)

Grand Slam doubles results
- Australian Open: 2R (1997, 1998, 1999, 2001)
- French Open: 2R (1999)
- Wimbledon: 2R (1997, 2000)
- US Open: 2R (1996, 1998, 1999)

Seda Noorlander (born 22 May 1974) is a former tennis player from the Netherlands.

She turned professional in 1993, and reached the final of the 2001 Tashkent Open in singles losing to Bianka Lamade. In her career, Noorlander won one doubles titles with Christina Papadáki. Her career-high ranking is No. 80 in the world, which she achieved on 13 December 1999. Her best Grand Slam performance was reaching the third round of Wimbledon in 1999.

== WTA Tour finals ==
Legend
Tier I
Tier II
Tier III
Tier IV & V

=== Singles: 1 (runner-up) ===
Result	Date	Tournament	Surface	Opponent	Score
Loss	Jun 2001	Tashkent Open, Uzbekistan	Hard	(Germany) Bianka Lamade	3–6, 6–2, 2–6

=== Doubles: 3 (1 title, 2 runner-ups) ===
Result	No.	Date	Tournament	Surface	Partner	Opponents	Score
Loss	1.	Aug 1998	Warsaw Open, Poland	Clay	(Sweden) Åsa Carlsson	(Czech Republic) Kveta Peschke (Czech Republic) Helena Vildová	2–6, 4–6
Loss	2.	Jan 1999	Auckland Open, New Zealand	Hard	(Germany) Marlene Weingärtner	(Italy) Silvia Farina Elia (Austria) Barbara Schett	2–6, 6–7^{(2–7)}
Win	3.	Feb 1999	Copa Colsanitas, Colombia	Clay	(Greece) Christína Papadáki	(Argentina) Laura Montalvo (Argentina) Paola Suárez	6–4, 7–6^{(7–5)}

== ITF finals ==
Legend
$75,000 tournaments
$50,000 tournaments
$25,000 tournaments
$10,000 tournaments

=== Singles (3–10) ===
Result	No.	Date	Tournament	Surface	Opponent	Score
Win	1.	13 November 1995	ITF Edinburgh, Great Britain	Carpet (i)	(Russia) Julia Lutrova	6–3, 4–6, 7–5
Loss	2.	27 July 1997	ITF İstanbul, Turkey	Hard	(Italy) Gloria Pizzichini	6–0, 4–6, 6–7
Loss	3.	12 October 1997	ITF Tampico, Mexico	Hard	(Greece) Christína Papadáki	3–6, 4–6
Loss	4.	7 June 1998	Surbiton Trophy, Great Britain	Grass	(France) Amélie Cocheteux	2–6, 4–6
Loss	5.	13 September 1998	ITF Mexico City	Hard	(Greece) Christína Papadáki	3–6, 1–6
Loss	6.	5 December 1999	ITF Cergy, France	Hard (i)	(Bulgaria) Magdalena Maleeva	1–6, 4–6
Loss	7.	7 January 2001	ITF São Paulo, Brazil	Hard	(Argentina) Clarisa Fernández	3–6, 1–6
Win	8.	15 April 2001	ITF Dinan, France	Clay	(Romania) Cătălina Cristea	6–4, 6–2
Win	9.	22 July 2001	ITF São José dos Campos, Brazil	Hard	(Brazil) Vanessa Menga	6–1, 6–3
Loss	10.	23 September 2001	ITF São José dos Campos	Clay	(Spain) Conchita Martínez Granados	5–7, 4–6
Loss	11.	18 November 2001	ITF Hattiesburg, United States	Hard	(Kazakhstan) Irina Selyutina	2–6, 1–6
Loss	12.	3 November 2002	Internationaux de Poitiers, France	Hard (i)	(France) Marion Bartoli	1–6, 0–6
Loss	13.	26 January 2003	ITF Fullerton, United States	Hard	(United States) Bethanie Mattek-Sands	4–6, 6–3, 4–6

=== Doubles (22–10) ===
Result	No.	Date	Tournament	Surface	Partner	Opponents	Score
Win	1.	7 July 1991	ITF Båstad, Sweden	Clay	(Netherlands) Sandra van der Aa	(Hungary) Antonia Homolya (Denmark) Karin Ptaszek	6–3, 6–4
Loss	2.	12 August 1991	ITF Rebecq, Belgium	Clay	(Netherlands) Sandra van der Aa	(Poland) Katarzyna Teodorowicz (Poland) Agata Werblińska	2–6, 7–5, 2–6
Win	3.	9 February 1992	ITF Swansea, Great Britain	Hard (i)	(Netherlands) Eva Haslinghuis	(Switzerland) Susanna Locher (United Kingdom) Alison Smith	6–3, 4–6, 6–4
Win	4.	13 June 1993	ITF Ashkelon, Israel	Hard	(Netherlands) Sandra van der Aa	(Israel) Yael Segal (Finland) Petra Thorén	6–4, 6–4
Win	5.	27 February 1994	ITF Rocafort, Spain	Hard (i)	(Netherlands) Hanneke Ketelaars	(Spain) Gala León García (Spain) Janet Souto	6–4, 6–4
Win	6.	24 July 1994	Rheda-Wiedenbrück, Germany	Clay	(Netherlands) Annemarie Mikkers	(Germany) Kirstin Freye (Germany) Angela Kerek	6–3, 6–2
Win	7.	5 February 1995	ITF Coburg, Germany	Hard (i)	(Germany) Marlene Weingärtner	(Poland) Magdalena Feistel (Czech Republic) Helena Vildová	6–2, 6–7, 6–2
Win	8.	20 February 1995	ITF Newcastle, Great Britain	Carpet (i)	(Greece) Christína Papadáki	(Czech Republic) Sandra Kleinová (Czech Republic) Ludmila Varmužová	7–6^{(7–3)}, 6–3
Loss	9.	27 February 1995	ITF Southampton, Great Britain	Carpet (i)	(Greece) Christína Papadáki	(Belgium) Dominique Monami (Hungary) Andrea Temesvari	4–6, 2–6
Win	10.	21 May 1995	ITF Bordeaux, France	Clay	(Czech Republic) Helena Vildová	(United States) Erika deLone (Australia) Nicole Pratt	6–3, 6–1
Loss	11.	17 June 1995	ITF Getxo, Spain	Clay	(Netherlands) Maaike Koutstaal	(Poland) Magdalena Grzybowska (Argentina) María Fernanda Landa	2–6, 4–6
Win	12.	29 October 1995	Internationaux de Poitiers, France	Hard (i)	(Germany) Kirstin Freye	(Netherlands) Kim de Weille (Netherlands) Nathalie Thijssen	6–4, 6–4
Win	13.	26 May 1996	ITF Novi Sad, Yugoslavia	Clay	(Czech Republic) Helena Vildová	(Brazil) Miriam D'Agostini (Paraguay) Larissa Schaerer	4–6, 6–1, 6–1
Loss	14.	7 July 1996	ITF Stuttgart, Germany	Clay	(Netherlands) Amanda Hopmans	(Czech Republic) Lenka Cenková (Czech Republic) Adriana Gerši	6–2, 3–6, ret.
Win	15.	10 November 1996	ITF Ramat Hasharon, Israel	Hard	(Germany) Kirstin Freye	(Netherlands) Anique Snijders (Netherlands) Noëlle van Lottum	6–2, 7–5
Win	16.	23 February 1997	Copa Colsanitas, Colombia	Clay	(Greece) Christína Papadáki	(Argentina) Laura Montalvo (Argentina) Mercedes Paz	7–6, 4–6, 7–5
Win	17.	6 July 1997	ITF Stuttgart, Germany	Clay	(India) Nirupama Vaidyanathan	(Argentina) María Fernanda Landa (Germany) Marlene Weingärtner	6–3, 6–1
Loss	18.	13 July 1997	ITF Puchheim, Germany	Clay	(Argentina) María Fernanda Landa	(Germany) Kirstin Freye (Netherlands) Noëlle van Lottum	1–6, 2–6
Loss	19.	2 November 1997	ITF Edinburgh, Great Britain	Hard (i)	(Netherlands) Amanda Hopmans	(United Kingdom) Julie Pullin (United Kingdom) Lorna Woodroffe	3–6, 1–6
Loss	20.	8 March 1998	ITF Rockford, United States	Hard (i)	(Georgia (country)) Nino Louarsabishvili	(South Africa) Surina De Beer (United States) Lindsay Lee-Waters	2–6, 4–6
Win	21.	12 September 1998	ITF Mexico City	Hard	(Greece) Christína Papadáki	(Argentina) Celeste Contín (Mexico) Jessica Fernández	6–3, 6–1
Win	22.	4 October 1998	ITF Caracas, Venezuela	Hard	(Argentina) María Fernanda Landa	(South Africa) Nannie de Villiers (Slovakia) Janette Husárová	6–4, 5–7, 7–6
Win	23.	18 October 1998	ITF São Paulo, Brazil	Clay	(Greece) Christína Papadáki	(Italy) Alice Canepa (Italy) Antonella Serra Zanetti	6–3, 6–7, 7–6
Win	24.	22 November 1998	ITF Buenos Aires, Argentina	Clay	(Slovenia) Katarina Srebotnik	(Spain) Eva Bes (Argentina) María Fernanda Landa	7–6^{(7–5)}, 6–3
Loss	25.	22 August 1999	Bronx Open, United States	Hard	(Austria) Patricia Wartusch	(South Africa) Surina De Beer (Japan) Nana Smith	6–3, 0–6, 3–6
Win	26.	30 September 2000	ITF Santa Clara, United States	Hard	(Germany) Kirstin Freye	(United States) Dawn Buth (Slovenia) Petra Rampre	6–1, 6–4
Loss	27.	12 November 2000	ITF Pittsburgh, United States	Hard (i)	(Germany) Kirstin Freye	(India) Nirupama Sanjeev (Japan) Nana Smith	7–5, 4–6, 0–6
Win	28.	8 April 2001	Dubai Tennis Challenge, United Arab Emirates	Hard	(Belgium) Laurence Courtois	(France) Caroline Dhenin (Hungary) Katalin Marosi	6–3, 6–0
Win	29.	7 April 2002	Dubai Tennis Challenge	Hard	(Germany) Kirstin Freye	(Morocco) Bahia Mouhtassine (Indonesia) Angelique Widjaja	6–2, 6–4
Win	30.	2 February 2003	ITF Rockford, United States	Hard (i)	(Netherlands) Debby Haak	(Czech Republic) Michaela Paštiková (Italy) Valentina Sassi	7–5, 6–4
Win	31.	2 April 2005	ITF Poza Rica, Mexico	Hard	(Italy) Mara Santangelo	(Austria) Daniela Klemenschits (Austria) Sandra Klemenschits	6–2, 4–6, 6–3
Loss	32.	10 September 2005	ITF Madrid, Spain	Hard	(Republic of Ireland) Kelly Liggan	(Slovenia) Andreja Klepač (Croatia) Nika Ožegović	3–6, 3–6
