= 1993 Torneo Internazionale Femminile di Palermo – Doubles =

Doubles
- 1993 Torneo Internazionale Femminile di Palermo

Final
- Champions: (Germany) Karin Kschwendt (Ukraine) Natalia Medvedeva
- Runners-up: (Italy) Silvia Farina (Netherlands) Brenda Schultz
- Score: 6–4, 7–6^{(7–4)}

Details
- Draw: 16 (1WC/1Q)
- Seeds: 4

Events
Singles	Doubles
← 1992 ·	Palermo Ladies Open	· 1994 →

Halle Cioffi and María José Gaidano were the defending champions, but both players competed this year with different partners. Cioffi teamed up with Caroline Schneider and lost in the first round to Karin Kschwendt and Natalia Medvedeva, while Gaidano teamed up with Radka Bobková and also lost in the first round to Susanna Attili and Elena Savoldi.

Kschwendt and Medvedeva won the title by defeating Silvia Farina and Brenda Schultz 6–4, 7–6^{(7–4)} in the final.

== Seeds ==
1. (Italy) Sandra Cecchini / (Argentina) Patricia Tarabini (semifinals)
2. (Italy) Silvia Farina / (Netherlands) Brenda Schultz (final)
3. (Germany) Karin Kschwendt / (Ukraine) Natalia Medvedeva (champions)
4. (Czech Republic) Radka Bobková / (Argentina) María José Gaidano (first round)

== Draw ==
=== Key ===
- Q = Qualifier
- WC = Wild card
- LL = Lucky loser
- Alt = Alternate
- SE = Special exempt
- PR = Protected ranking
- ITF = ITF entry
- JE = Junior exempt
- w/o = Walkover
- r = Retired
- d = Defaulted
- SR = Special ranking

=== Draw ===
First round
1	(Italy) S Cecchini (Argentina) P Tarabini	2
WC	(Italy) MF Bentivolgio (Italy) Ad Serra Zanetti	1^{r}
(Spain) V Ruano Pascual (Romania) I Spîrlea	4	1
(China) F Li (Poland) M Mróz	6	6
3	(Germany) K Kschwendt (Ukraine) N Medvedeva	6	6
(United States) H Cioffi (Germany) C Schneider	1	2
(Australia) K Godridge (Czech Republic) P Langrová	6	6
(Italy) N Baudone (Italy) L Garrone	3	0
(Netherlands) S Noorlander (Netherlands) S van der Aa	5	6	7^{7}
(Italy) M Grossi (Italy) G Pizzichini	7	3	6^{5}
(Netherlands) I Driehuis (Mexico) L Novelo	5	6	7^{7}
4	(Czech Republic) R Bobková (Argentina) MJ Gaidano	7	3	6^{5}
(Italy) S Attili (Italy) E Savoldi	7	6
Q	(Croatia) N Ercegović (Germany) S Meier	5	2
(Germany) M Babel (Austria) P Ritter	0	2
2	(Italy) S Farina (Netherlands) B Schultz	6	6

Quarterfinals
1	(Italy) S Cecchini (Argentina) P Tarabini	1	6	6
(China) F Li (Poland) M Mróz	6	3	4
3	(Germany) K Kschwendt (Ukraine) N Medvedeva	1	7^{8}	6
(Australia) K Godridge (Czech Republic) P Langrová	6	6^{6}	0
(Netherlands) S Noorlander (Netherlands) S van der Aa	3	2
(Netherlands) I Driehuis (Mexico) L Novelo	6	6
(Italy) S Attili (Italy) E Savoldi	6	4	3
2	(Italy) S Farina (Netherlands) B Schultz	1	6	6

Semifinals
1	(Italy) S Cecchini (Argentina) P Tarabini	5	5
3	(Germany) K Kschwendt (Ukraine) N Medvedeva	7	7
(Netherlands) I Driehuis (Mexico) L Novelo	2	3
2	(Italy) S Farina (Netherlands) B Schultz	6	6

Final
3	(Germany) K Kschwendt (Ukraine) N Medvedeva	6	7^{7}
2	(Italy) S Farina (Netherlands) B Schultz	4	6^{4}
