= 1993 Torneo Internazionale Femminile di Palermo – Singles =

Singles
- 1993 Torneo Internazionale Femminile di Palermo

Final
- Champion: (Czech Republic) Radka Bobková
- Runner-up: (France) Mary Pierce
- Score: 6–3, 6–2

Details
- Draw: 32 (1WC/4Q/1LL)
- Seeds: 8

Events
Singles	Doubles
← 1992 ·	Palermo Ladies Open	· 1994 →

Two-time tournament winner Mary Pierce lost in the final against Radka Bobková. The score was 6–3, 6–2.

== Seeds ==
1. (France) Mary Pierce (final)
2. (Netherlands) Brenda Schultz (second round)
3. (Italy) Sandra Cecchini (semifinals)
4. (Germany) Karin Kschwendt (first round)
5. (Argentina) Patricia Tarabini (semifinals)
6. (Italy) Federica Bonsignori (first round)
7. (Croatia) Nadin Ercegović (first round)
8. (Italy) Nathalie Baudone (second round)

== Draw ==
=== Key ===
- Q = Qualifier
- WC = Wild card
- LL = Lucky loser
- Alt = Alternate
- SE = Special exempt
- PR = Protected ranking
- ITF = ITF entry
- JE = Junior exempt
- w/o = Walkover
- r = Retired
- d = Defaulted
- SR = Special ranking

=== Finals ===
Semifinals
1	(France) Mary Pierce	6	6
3	(Italy) Sandra Cecchini	2	2
(Czech Republic) Radka Bobková	7^{7}	6
5	(Argentina) Patricia Tarabini	6^{3}	1

Final
1	(France) Mary Pierce	3	2
(Czech Republic) Radka Bobková	6	6

=== Top half ===
First round
1	(France) M Pierce	7^{7}	6
(Italy) G Pizzichini	6^{3}	2
(Italy) MF Bentivoglio	6	2	6
(Czech Republic) P Langrová	3	6	2
(Belgium) D Monami	6	6
(United States) H Cioffi	2	0
Q	(Poland) M Mróz	1	2
8	(Italy) N Baudone	6	6
3	(Italy) S Cecchini	6	7
(Italy) S Farina	4	5
Q	(Austria) P Ritter	2	6	6
WC	(Italy) L Garrone	6	3	4
Q	(Italy) M Grossi	6	6
(Italy) K Piccolini	4	2
(Germany) M Babel	6	6^{8}	6
6	(Italy) F Bonsignori	1	7^{10}	0

Second round
1	(France) M Pierce	6	6
(Italy) MF Bentivoglio	0	3
(Belgium) D Monami	2	6	6
8	(Italy) N Baudone	6	1	2
3	(Italy) S Cecchini	6	7
Q	(Austria) P Ritter	4	5
Q	(Italy) M Grossi	6	6
(Germany) M Babel	4	2

Quarterfinals
1	(France) M Pierce	6	6
(Belgium) D Monami	0	4
3	(Italy) S Cecchini	6	6
Q	(Italy) M Grossi	0	3

Semifinals
1	(France) M Pierce	6	6
3	(Italy) S Cecchini	2	2

=== Bottom half ===
First round
7	(Croatia) N Ercegović	6	1	2
(Romania) I Spîrlea	4	6	6
(Germany) S Meier	3	6	7
(Germany) M Živec-Škulj	6	4	5
(Czech Republic) R Bobková	6	6
(Belgium) S Wasserman	3	1
Q	(Italy) Ad Serra Zanetti	7	7^{8}
4	(Germany) K Kschwendt	5	6^{6}
5	(Argentina) P Tarabini	6	7
(Ukraine) N Medvedeva	3	5
(Argentina) MJ Gaidano	6	6^{3}	4
(China) F Li	4	7^{7}	6
(Spain) V Ruano Pascual	2	6^{9}
(Switzerland) E Zardo	6	7^{11}
LL	(Italy) E Savoldi	4	0
2	(Netherlands) B Schultz	6	6

Second round
(Romania) I Spîrlea	6	6
(Germany) S Meier	4	0
(Czech Republic) R Bobková	6	6
Q	(Italy) Ad Serra Zanetti	2	1
5	(Argentina) P Tarabini	6	6
(China) F Li	4	4
(Switzerland) E Zardo	6	6
2	(Netherlands) B Schultz	4	2

Quarterfinals
(Romania) I Spîrlea	3	5
(Czech Republic) R Bobková	6	7
5	(Argentina) P Tarabini	6	7^{8}
(Switzerland) E Zardo	4	6^{6}

Semifinals
(Czech Republic) R Bobková	7^{7}	6
5	(Argentina) P Tarabini	6^{3}	1
