= 1996 Internazionali Femminili di Palermo – Doubles =

Doubles
- 1996 Internazionali Femminili di Palermo
- 1995 Champions: (Czech Republic) Radka Bobková (Czech Republic) Petra Langrová

Final
- Champions: (Slovakia) Janette Husárová (Austria) Barbara Schett
- Runners-up: (Argentina) Florencia Labat (Germany) Barbara Rittner
- Score: 6–1, 6–2

Details
- Draw: 16
- Seeds: 4

Events
Singles	Doubles
← 1995 ·	Internazionali Femminili di Palermo	· 1997 →

Radka Bobková and Petra Langrová were the defending champions but only Bobkova competed that year with Flora Perfetti.

Bobkova and Perfetti lost in the quarterfinals to Florencia Labat and Barbara Rittner.

Janette Husárová and Barbara Schett won in the final 6–1, 6–2 against Labat and Rittner.

== Seeds ==
Champion seeds are indicated in bold text while text in italics indicates the round in which those seeds were eliminated.

1. (Italy) Sandra Cecchini / (Italy) Laura Garrone (first round)
2. (Germany) Silke Meier / (Slovakia) Henrieta Nagyová (quarterfinals)
3. (Czech Republic) Radka Bobková / (Italy) Flora Perfetti (quarterfinals)
4. (United States) Corina Morariu / (France) Sarah Pitkowski (semifinals)

== Draw ==
=== Key ===
- Q = Qualifier
- WC = Wild card
- LL = Lucky loser
- Alt = Alternate
- SE = Special exempt
- PR = Protected ranking
- ITF = ITF entry
- JE = Junior exempt
- w/o = Walkover
- r = Retired
- d = Defaulted
- SR = Special ranking

First round
1	(Italy) S Cecchini (Italy) L Garrone	**7**	4	0
(Slovakia) **J Husárová** (Austria) **B Schett**	5	**6**	**6**
(Austria) **S Dopfer** (Austria) **E Habeler**	**6**	2	**6**
(San Marino) F Guardigli (Italy) M Guglielmi	1	**6**	1
4	(United States) **C Morariu** (France) **S Pitkowski**	**6**	4	**6**
(Italy) A Risuleo (Italy) A Serra Zanetti	2	**6**	1
(Italy) E Brusati (Italy) M P Zavagli	0	2
(Argentina) **B Fulco-Villella** (Spain) **Á Montolio**	**6**	**6**
(Argentina) **F Labat** (Germany) **B Rittner**	2	**6**	**6**
(Czech Republic) S Kleinová (Czech Republic) R Pelikánová	**6**	3	1
(Netherlands) P Kamstra (Germany) V Martinek	6	5
3	(Czech Republic) **R Bobková** (Italy) **F Perfetti**	**7**	**7**
(Italy) **A Canepa** (Belgium) **S Devillé**	**6**	**6**
(Italy) C Salvi (Italy) E Savoldi	4	0
(Germany) J Kandarr (Czech Republic) J Pospíšilová	0	3
2	(Germany) **S Meier** (Slovakia) **H Nagyová**	**6**	**6**

Quarterfinals
(Slovakia) **J Husárová** (Austria) **B Schett**	**6**	**6**
(Austria) S Dopfer (Austria) E Habeler	2	2
4	(United States) **C Morariu** (France) **S Pitkowski**	**7**	**6**
(Argentina) B Fulco-Villella (Spain) Á Montolio	5	0
(Argentina) **F Labat** (Germany) **B Rittner**	**6**	**6**
3	(Czech Republic) R Bobková (Italy) F Perfetti	4	2
(Italy) **A Canepa** (Belgium) **S Devillé**	**6**	**6**
2	(Germany) S Meier (Slovakia) H Nagyová	4	4

Semifinals
(Slovakia) **J Husárová** (Austria) **B Schett**	**6**	**6**
4	(United States) C Morariu (France) S Pitkowski	3	1
(Argentina) **F Labat** (Germany) **B Rittner**	**7**	**6**
(Italy) A Canepa (Belgium) S Devillé	6	1

Final
(Slovakia) **Janette Husárová** (Austria) **Barbara Schett**	**6**	**6**
(Argentina) Florencia Labat (Germany) Barbara Rittner	1	2
