= 1995 Internazionali Femminili di Palermo – Doubles =

Doubles
- 1995 Internazionali Femminili di Palermo
- 1994 Champions: (Romania) Ruxandra Dragomir; (Italy) Laura Garrone

Final
- Champions: (Czech Republic) Radka Bobková; (Czech Republic) Petra Langrová
- Runners-up: (Austria) Petra Schwarz; (Slovakia) Katarína Studeníková
- Score: 6–4, 6–1

Details
- Draw: 16
- Seeds: 4

Events
Singles	Doubles
← 1994 ·	Internazionali Femminili di Palermo	· 1996 →

Ruxandra Dragomir and Laura Garrone were the defending champions; only Garrone competed that year, with Sandra Cecchini. They lost a semifinal to Petra Schwarz and Katarína Studeníková, who lost the final to Radka Bobková and Petra Langrová, 6–4, 6–1.

== Seeds ==
Champion seeds are indicated in bold text while text in italics indicates the round in which those seeds were eliminated.

1. (Slovakia) Karina Habšudová / (Ukraine) Natalia Medvedeva (first round)
2. (Italy) Silvia Farina / (Germany) Karin Kschwendt (quarterfinals)
3. (Italy) Sandra Cecchini / (Italy) Laura Garrone (semifinals)
4. (Czech Republic) **Radka Bobková** / (Czech Republic) **Petra Langrová (champions)**

== Draw ==
=== Key ===
- Q = Qualifier
- WC = Wild card
- LL = Lucky loser
- Alt = Alternate
- SE = Special exempt
- PR = Protected ranking
- ITF = ITF entry
- JE = Junior exempt
- w/o = Walkover
- r = Retired
- d = Defaulted
- SR = Special ranking

First round

Quarterfinals

Semifinals

Final

1
- (Slovakia) K Habšudová
- (Ukraine) N Medvedeva
3
6

- (Italy) **A Canepa**
- (Italy) **G Casoni**
**6**
**7**

- (Italy) **A Canepa**
- (Italy) **G Casoni**
2
**7**
**6**

- (Switzerland) G Dondit
- (Spain) M Ramón Climent
3
1

LL
- (Finland) N Dahlman
- (Germany) S Hack
**6**
6
1

LL
- (Finland) **N Dahlman**
- (Germany) **S Hack**
**6**
**6**

- (Italy) A Canepa
- (Italy) G Casoni
5
6

4
- (Czech Republic) **R Bobková**
- (Czech Republic) **P Langrová**
2
**6**
**6**

4
- (Czech Republic) **R Bobková**
- (Czech Republic) **P Langrová**
**7**
**7**

- (Italy) F Lubiani
- (Italy) M P Zavagli
**6**
3
4

4
- (Czech Republic) **R Bobková**
- (Czech Republic) **P Langrová**
**7**
**7**

- (Germany) S Meier
- (Germany) M Weingärtner
4
2

- (Italy) F Perfetti
- (Italy) G Pizzichini
5
5

- (Italy) **F Perfetti**
- (Italy) **G Pizzichini**
**6**
**6**

4
- (Czech Republic) **Radka Bobková**
- (Czech Republic) **Petra Langrová**
**6**
**6**

- (Chinese Taipei) J Lee
- (United States) A Miller
2
3

- (Austria) Petra Schwarz
- (Slovakia) Katarína Studeníková
4
1

- (Netherlands) **K de Weille**
- (Switzerland) **E Gagliardi**
**6**
**6**

- (Netherlands) K de Weille
- (Switzerland) E Gagliardi
2
3

- (Czech Republic) E Martincová
- (Germany) V Martinek
4
1

3
- (Italy) **S Cecchini**
- (Italy) **L Garrone**
**6**
**6**

3
- (Italy) **S Cecchini**
- (Italy) **L Garrone**
**6**
**6**

3
- (Italy) S Cecchini
- (Italy) L Garrone
4
**6**
2

Q
- (Argentina) B Fulco-Villella
- (Spain) V Ruano-Pascual
4
**6**
6

- (Austria) **P Schwarz**
- (Slovakia) **K Studeníková**
**6**
2
**6**

- (Austria) **P Schwarz**
- (Slovakia) **K Studeníková**
**6**
3
**7**

- (Austria) **P Schwarz**
- (Slovakia) **K Studeníková**
**7**
2
**7**

- (Italy) M Grossi
- (Italy) M Guglielmi
1
3

2
- (Italy) S Farina
- (Germany) K Kschwendt
6
**6**
5

2
- (Italy) **S Farina**
- (Germany) **K Kschwendt**
**6**
**6**
