= 1995 Internazionali Femminili di Palermo – Singles =

Singles
- 1995 Internazionali Femminili di Palermo
- 1994 Champion: (Romania) Irina Spîrlea

Final
- Champion: (Romania) Irina Spîrlea
- Runner-up: (Germany) Sabine Hack
- Score: 7–6, 6–2

Details
- Draw: 32
- Seeds: 8

Events
Singles	Doubles
← 1994 ·	Internazionali Femminili di Palermo	· 1996 →

Irina Spîrlea was the defending champion and won in the final 7–6, 6–2 against Sabine Hack.

== Seeds ==
A champion seed is indicated in bold text while text in italics indicates the round in which that seed was eliminated.

1. (Slovakia) Karina Habšudová (quarterfinals)
2. (Romania) **Irina Spîrlea (champion)**
3. (Italy) Sandra Cecchini (first round)
4. (Germany) Barbara Rittner (first round)
5. (Germany) Sabine Hack (final)
6. (Italy) Silvia Farina (quarterfinals)
7. (Ukraine) Natalia Medvedeva (semifinals)
8. (Spain) Virginia Ruano Pascual (first round)

== Draw ==
=== Key ===
- Q = Qualifier
- WC = Wild card
- LL = Lucky loser
- Alt = Alternate
- SE = Special exempt
- PR = Protected ranking
- ITF = ITF entry
- JE = Junior exempt
- w/o = Walkover
- r = Retired
- d = Defaulted
- SR = Special ranking

First round
1	(Slovakia) **K Habšudová**	**6**	**6**
(Austria) S Dopfer	2	3
(Germany) **J Kandarr**	**6**	**7**
LL	(Netherlands) K de Weille	1	5
(Czech Republic) **P Langrová**	**6**	**7**
(Finland) N Dahlman	4	5
(Germany) K Kschwendt	5	4
7	(Ukraine) **N Medvedeva**	**7**	**6**
4	(Germany) B Rittner	3	0	r
LL	(Chinese Taipei) **J Lee**	**6**	**1**
(Italy) **F Perfetti**	**6**	**6**
WC	(Italy) L Garrone	2	1
WC	(Germany) M Weingärtner	3	0
Q	(Italy) **A Canepa**	**6**	**6**
(Spain) S Ramón-Cortés	2	1
5	(Germany) **S Hack**	**6**	**6**
8	(Spain) V Ruano-Pascual	4	3
(Germany) **V Martinek**	**6**	**6**
(Czech Republic) **R Bobková**	**6**	**6**
(Italy) G Casoni	1	4
(Austria) **P Schwarz**	3	**6**	**7**
Q	(Switzerland) G Dondit	**6**	2	6
(Austria) **B Schett**	**6**	3	**6**
3	(Italy) S Cecchini	1	**6**	4
6	(Italy) **S Farina**	6	**6**	**7**
(Spain) N Ávila Bonastre	**7**	4	6
(Slovakia) K Studeníková	3	5
Q	(Italy) **F Lubiani**	**6**	**7**
(Austria) **B Paulus**	**6**	5	**6**
Q	(Croatia) S Talaja	3	**7**	2
(Germany) S Meier	0	3
2	(Romania) **I Spîrlea**	**6**	**6**

Second round
1	(Slovakia) **K Habšudová**	**6**	**7**
(Germany) J Kandarr	3	6
(Czech Republic) P Langrová	2	2
7	(Ukraine) **N Medvedeva**	**6**	**6**
LL	(Chinese Taipei) J Lee	2	3
(Italy) **F Perfetti**	**6**	**6**
Q	(Italy) A Canepa	2	4
5	(Germany) **S Hack**	**6**	**6**
(Germany) **V Martinek**	**6**	**6**
(Czech Republic) R Bobková	4	4
(Austria) P Schwarz	3	1
(Austria) **B Schett**	**6**	**6**
6	(Italy) **S Farina**	**6**	**6**
Q	(Italy) F Lubiani	1	4
(Austria) B Paulus	4	2
2	(Romania) **I Spîrlea**	**6**	**6**

Quarterfinals
1	(Slovakia) K Habšudová	**6**	4	3
7	(Ukraine) **N Medvedeva**	3	**6**	**6**
(Italy) F Perfetti	3	0
5	(Germany) **S Hack**	**6**	**6**
(Germany) V Martinek	3	1
(Austria) **B Schett**	**6**	**6**
6	(Italy) S Farina	**6**	2	6
2	(Romania) **I Spîrlea**	4	**6**	**7**

Semifinals
7	(Ukraine) N Medvedeva	**6**	4	2
5	(Germany) **S Hack**	4	**6**	**6**
(Austria) B Schett	3	1
2	(Romania) **I Spîrlea**	**6**	**6**

Final
5	(Germany) Sabine Hack	6	2
2	(Romania) **Irina Spîrlea**	**7**	**6**
