= 1996 Internazionali Femminili di Palermo – Singles =

Singles
- 1996 Internazionali Femminili di Palermo
- 1995 Champion: (Romania) Irina Spîrlea

Final
- Champion: (Austria) Barbara Schett
- Runner-up: (Germany) Sabine Hack
- Score: 6–3, 6–3

Details
- Draw: 32
- Seeds: 8

Events
Singles	Doubles
← 1995 ·	Internazionali Femminili di Palermo	· 1997 →

Irina Spîrlea was the defending champion but lost in the second round to Stephanie Devillé.

Barbara Schett won in the final 6–3, 6–3 against Sabine Hack.

== Seeds ==
A champion seed is indicated in bold text while text in italics indicates the round in which that seed was eliminated.

1. (Romania) Irina Spîrlea (second round)
2. (Germany) Sabine Hack (final)
3. (Italy) Silvia Farina (semifinals)
4. (Austria) **Barbara Schett (champion)**
5. (Argentina) Florencia Labat (second round)
6. (Germany) Barbara Rittner (first round)
7. (Spain) Gala León García (first round)
8. (Slovakia) Henrieta Nagyová (quarterfinals)

== Draw ==
=== Key ===
- Q = Qualifier
- WC = Wild card
- LL = Lucky loser
- Alt = Alternate
- SE = Special exempt
- PR = Protected ranking
- ITF = ITF entry
- JE = Junior exempt
- w/o = Walkover
- r = Retired
- d = Defaulted
- SR = Special ranking

First round
1	(Romania) **I Spîrlea**	**6**	**6**
Q	(Germany) S Meier	4	0
(Italy) S Cecchini	2	1
Q	(Belgium) **S Devillé**	**6**	**6**
(Netherlands) **P Kamstra**	**6**	**6**
LL	(Austria) P Wartusch	0	4
(Germany) **J Kandarr**	2	**6**	**6**
7	(Spain) G León García	**6**	4	4
4	(Austria) **B Schett**	**6**	**6**
(Italy) N Baudone	2	1
(Germany) **A Glass**	3	**7**	**7**
WC	(Italy) L Garrone	**6**	5	6
(Austria) **S Dopfer**	3	**7**	**6**
(Slovakia) J Husárová	**6**	6	0
(Italy) **F Perfetti**	3	**6**	**6**
6	(Germany) B Rittner	**6**	4	1
5	(Argentina) **F Labat**	**6**	**6**
WC	(Italy) Ant. Serra Zanetti	3	3
(France) **S Pitkowski**	**6**	**6**
Q	(Argentina) B Fulco-Villella	0	4
Q	(Italy) C Salvi	4	1
(United States) **C Morariu**	**6**	**6**
(Czech Republic) R Bobková	0	6
3	(Italy) **S Farina**	**6**	**7**
8	(Slovakia) **H Nagyová**	**6**	4	**6**
(Spain) M Sánchez Lorenzo	2	**6**	3
(Spain) **Á Montolio**	**6**	**6**
(Czech Republic) S Kleinová	4	4
(Argentina) **I Gorrochategui**	**7**	**7**
(Italy) Adr. Serra Zanetti	5	5
(Germany) V Martinek	3	2
2	(Germany) **S Hack**	**6**	**6**

Second round
1	(Romania) I Spîrlea	**7**	6	d
Q	(Belgium) **S Devillé**	5	**7**
(Netherlands) P Kamstra
(Germany) **J Kandarr**	**w/o**
4	(Austria) **B Schett**	**6**	**6**
(Germany) A Glass	4	2
(Austria) **S Dopfer**	**6**	**6**
(Italy) F Perfetti	4	1
5	(Argentina) F Labat	5	6
(France) **S Pitkowski**	**7**	**7**
(United States) C Morariu	0	6
3	(Italy) **S Farina**	**6**	**7**
8	(Slovakia) **H Nagyová**	**6**	**6**
(Spain) Á Montolio	1	1
(Argentina) I Gorrochategui	4	r
2	(Germany) **S Hack**	**6**

Quarterfinals
Q	(Belgium) S Devillé	4	**6**	4
(Germany) **J Kandarr**	**6**	2	**6**
4	(Austria) **B Schett**	**6**	**6**
(Austria) S Dopfer	4	1
(France) S Pitkowski	6	1
3	(Italy) **S Farina**	**7**	**6**
8	(Slovakia) H Nagyová	4	1
2	(Germany) **S Hack**	**6**	**6**

Semifinals
(Germany) J Kandarr	1	**6**	2
4	(Austria) **B Schett**	**6**	3	**6**
3	(Italy) S Farina	0	1
2	(Germany) **S Hack**	**6**	**6**

Final
4	(Austria) **Barbara Schett**	**6**	**6**
2	(Germany) Sabine Hack	3	3
