= 1994 Torneo Internazional Femmin di Palermo – Singles =

Singles
- 1994 Torneo Internazional Femmin di Palermo
- 1993 Champion: (Czech Republic) Radka Bobková

Final
- Champion: (Romania) Irina Spîrlea
- Runner-up: (Netherlands) Brenda Schultz
- Score: 6–4, 1–6, 7–6^{(7–5)}

Details
- Draw: 32 (2WC/4Q)
- Seeds: 8

Events
| Singles | Doubles |
| ← 1993 · | Palermo Ladies Open | · 1995 → |

Radka Bobková was the defending champion, but lost in first round to Petra Begerow.

Irina Spîrlea won the title by defeating Brenda Schultz 6–4, 1–6, 7–6^{(7–5)} in the final.

== Seeds ==
1. (Netherlands) Brenda Schultz (final)
2. (Romania) Irina Spîrlea (champion)
3. (Germany) Barbara Rittner (first round)
4. (Italy) Sandra Cecchini (semifinals)
5. (Switzerland) Emanuela Zardo (first round)
6. (Austria) Beate Reinstadler (first round)
7. (Israel) Anna Smashnova (first round)
8. (Austria) Petra Ritter (quarterfinals)

== Draw ==
=== Key ===
- Q = Qualifier
- WC = Wild card
- LL = Lucky loser
- Alt = Alternate
- SE = Special exempt
- PR = Protected ranking
- ITF = ITF entry
- JE = Junior exempt
- w/o = Walkover
- r = Retired
- d = Defaulted
- SR = Special ranking

=== Finals ===
Semifinals
1 | (Netherlands) Brenda Schultz | 7^{7} | 6
4 | (Italy) Sandra Cecchini | 6^{3} | 4
(Austria) Sandra Dopfer | 5 | 4
2 | (Romania) Irina Spîrlea | 7 | 6

Final
1 | (Netherlands) Brenda Schultz | 4 | 6 | 6^{5}
2 | (Romania) Irina Spîrlea | 6 | 1 | 7^{7}

=== Top half ===
First round
1 | (Netherlands) B Schultz | 6 | 7
(Belgium) D Monami | 3 | 5
(Germany) P Begerow | 5 | 7^{7} | 6
(Czech Republic) R Bobková | 7 | 6^{5} | 2
WC | (Italy) L Garrone | 6 | 6
(Italy) M Grossi | 2 | 3
(China) F Li | 6 | 5 | 6
7 | (Israel) A Smashnova | 4 | 7 | 2
4 | (Italy) S Cecchini | 6 | 0 | 6
Q | (Greece) C Papadáki | 2 | 6 | 2
(Spain) Á Montolio | 3 | 1
(Italy) S Farina | 6 | 6
Q | (Italy) L Lapi | 5 | 4
(Argentina) B Fulco-Villella | 7 | 6
(Spain) N Ávila | 6 | 6
5 | (Switzerland) E Zardo | 4 | 4

Second round
1 | (Netherlands) B Schultz | 6 | 3 | 6^{3}
(Germany) P Begerow | 4 | 6 | 6^{3}r
WC | (Italy) L Garrone | 4 | 1
(China) F Li | 6 | 6
4 | (Italy) S Cecchini | 6 | 5 | 6
(Italy) S Farina | 2 | 7 | 3
(Argentina) B Fulco-Villella | 1 | 0
(Spain) N Ávila | 6 | 6

Quarterfinals
1 | (Netherlands) B Schultz | 6 | 4 | 6
(China) F Li | 4 | 6 | 4
4 | (Italy) S Cecchini | 3 | 6 | 6
(Spain) N Ávila | 6 | 4 | 0

Semifinals
1 | (Netherlands) B Schultz | 7^{7} | 6
4 | (Italy) S Cecchini | 6^{3} | 4

=== Bottom half ===
First round
8 | (Austria) P Ritter | 6 | 6^{5} | 6
(Argentina) P Tarabini | 4 | 7^{7} | 3
(Italy) E Savoldi | 6 | 6
(Romania) R Dragomir | 1 | 1
(Czech Republic) E Martincová | 6 | 3 | 6
WC | (Italy) R Grande | 3 | 6 | 4
(Austria) S Dopfer | 4 | 6 | 7
3 | (Germany) B Rittner | 6 | 2 | 5
6 | (Austria) B Reinstadler | 6 | 2 | 1
Q | (Croatia) S Talaja | 4 | 6 | 6
(Slovakia) K Studeníková | 6 | 7^{7}
(Slovenia) B Mulej | 4 | 6^{5}
(Belgium) L Courtois | 6 | 4 | 4
Q | (Hungary) A Temesvári | 4 | 6 | 6
(Czech Republic) P Langrová | 3 | 6 | 3
2 | (Romania) I Spîrlea | 6 | 3 | 6

Second round
8 | (Austria) P Ritter | 7^{7} | 6
(Italy) E Savoldi | 6^{4} | 4
(Czech Republic) E Martincová | 1 | 2
(Austria) S Dopfer | 6 | 6
Q | (Croatia) S Talaja | 1 | 2
(Slovakia) K Studeníková | 6 | 6
Q | (Hungary) A Temesvári | 2 | 0^{r}
2 | (Romania) I Spîrlea | 6 | 3

Quarterfinals
8 | (Austria) P Ritter | 3 | 6^{5}
(Austria) S Dopfer | 6 | 7^{7}
(Slovakia) K Studeníková | 1 | 3
2 | (Romania) I Spîrlea | 6 | 6

Semifinals
(Austria) S Dopfer | 5 | 4
2 | (Romania) I Spîrlea | 7 | 6
