= 1994 Torneo Internazional Femmin di Palermo – Doubles =

Doubles
- 1994 Torneo Internazional Femmin di Palermo

Final
- Champions: (Romania) Ruxandra Dragomir (Italy) Laura Garrone
- Runners-up: (Italy) Alice Canepa (Italy) Giulia Casoni
- Score: 6–1, 6–0

Details
- Draw: 16 (1WC/1Q)
- Seeds: 4

Events
Singles	Doubles
← 1993 ·	Internazionali Femminili di Palermo	· 1995 →

Karin Kschwendt and Natalia Medvedeva were the defending champions, but none competed this year.

Ruxandra Dragomir and Laura Garrone won the title by defeating qualifiers Alice Canepa and Giulia Casoni 6–1, 6–0 in the final.

== Seeds ==
1. (Germany) Barbara Rittner / (Argentina) Patricia Tarabini (first round)
2. (Italy) Silvia Farina / (Romania) Irina Spîrlea (first round)
3. (Belgium) Dominique Monami / (Austria) Petra Ritter (quarterfinals)
4. (Argentina) Bettina Fulco-Villella / (Ukraine) Olga Lugina (semifinals)

== Draw ==
=== Key ===
- Q = Qualifier
- WC = Wild card
- LL = Lucky loser
- Alt = Alternate
- SE = Special exempt
- PR = Protected ranking
- ITF = ITF entry
- JE = Junior exempt
- w/o = Walkover
- r = Retired
- d = Defaulted
- SR = Special ranking

=== Draw ===
First round
1	(Germany) B Rittner (Argentina) P Tarabini	2	3
(Argentina) L Montalvo (Italy) F Perfetti	6	6
(Romania) R Dragomir (Italy) L Garrone	6	6
(Slovakia) K Studeníková (Switzerland) E Zardo	1	1
3	(Belgium) D Monami (Austria) P Ritter	6	6
(Austria) S Dopfer (Germany) C Schneider	4	3
(Czech Republic) R Bobková (Czech Republic) P Langrová	6	6
(Belgium) L Courtois (Czech Republic) E Martincová	4	1
(Italy) S Attili (Italy) E Savoldi	6	7^{7}
(Greece) C Papadáki (Denmark) K Ptaszek	2	6^{4}
WC	(Italy) E Brusati (Italy) C Salvi	4	7	2
4	(Argentina) B Fulco-Villella (Ukraine) O Lugina	6	5	6
(China) F Li (Austria) B Reinstadler	6	7^{7}
(Italy) S Cecchini (Italy) R Grande	4	6^{1}
Q	(Italy) A Canepa (Italy) G Casoni	7^{7}	3	6
2	(Italy) S Farina (Romania) I Spîrlea	6^{5}	6	3

Quarterfinals
(Argentina) L Montalvo (Italy) F Perfetti	2	6	3
(Romania) R Dragomir (Italy) L Garrone	6	2	6
3	(Belgium) D Monami (Austria) P Ritter	6	3	4
(Czech Republic) R Bobková (Czech Republic) P Langrová	4	6	6
(Italy) S Attili (Italy) E Savoldi	0	2
4	(Argentina) B Fulco-Villella (Ukraine) O Lugina	6	6
(China) F Li (Austria) B Reinstadler	4	7	1
Q	(Italy) A Canepa (Italy) G Casoni	6	5	6

Semifinals
(Romania) R Dragomir (Italy) L Garrone	3	6	6
(Czech Republic) R Bobková (Czech Republic) P Langrová	6	4	2
4	(Argentina) B Fulco-Villella (Ukraine) O Lugina	3	5
Q	(Italy) A Canepa (Italy) G Casoni	6	7

Final
(Romania) R Dragomir (Italy) L Garrone	6	6
Q	(Italy) A Canepa (Italy) G Casoni	1	0
