= 1995 Internazionali Femminili di Palermo =

- Date: 10–16 July
- Edition: 8th
- Category: Tier IV
- Draw: 32S / 16D
- Prize money: $107,500
- Surface: Clay / outdoor
- Location: Palermo, Italy
- Venue: Country Time Club

Champions

Singles
- (Romania) Irina Spîrlea

Doubles
- (Czech Republic) Radka Bobková / (Czech Republic) Petra Langrová
← 1994 ·	Internazionali Femminili di Palermo	· 1996 →

The 1995 Internazionali Femminili di Palermo was a women's tennis tournament played on outdoor clay courts at the Country Time Club in Palermo, Italy that was part of the Tier IV category of the 1995 WTA Tour. It was the eighth edition of the tournament and was held from 10 July until 16 July 1995. Second-seeded Irina Spîrlea won her second consecutive singles title at the event and earned $17,500 first-prize money.

== Finals ==
=== Singles ===
(Romania) Irina Spîrlea defeated (Germany) Sabine Hack 7–6^{(7–1)}, 6–2

- It was Spîrlea's 1st singles title of the year and the 2nd of her career.

=== Doubles ===
(Czech Republic) Radka Bobková / (Czech Republic) Petra Langrová defeated (Austria) Petra Schwarz / (Slovakia) Katarína Studeníková 6–4, 6–1

- It was Bobkova's only title of the year and the 4th of her career. It was Langrová's only title of the year and the 6th of her career.
