= 1993 US Open – Women's singles =

Women's singles
- 1993 US Open

Final
- Champion: (Germany) Steffi Graf
- Runner-up: (Czech Republic) Helena Suková
- Score: 6–3, 6–3

Details
- Draw: 128
- Seeds: 16

Events
Singles	men	women		boys	girls
Doubles	men	women	mixed	boys	girls
WC Singles	men	women	quad
WC Doubles	men	women	quad
Legends	men	women	mixed
← 1992 ·	US Open	· 1994 →

Steffi Graf defeated Helena Suková in the final, 6–3, 6–3 to win the women's singles tennis title at the 1993 US Open. It was her third US Open title and 14th major singles title overall. This marked Suková's fourth and last appearance in a major final, finishing runner-up each time. With the win, Graf became the first player (male or female) to achieve the Surface Slam twice.

Monica Seles was the two-time reigning champion, but was unable to participate due to her on-court stabbing in April 1993.

== Seeds ==
The seeded players are listed below. Steffi Graf is the champion; others show the round in which they were eliminated.

1. (Germany) Steffi Graf (champion)
2. (Spain) Arantxa Sánchez Vicario (semifinalist)
3. (United States) Martina Navratilova (fourth round)
4. (Spain) Conchita Martínez (fourth round)
5. (Argentina) Gabriela Sabatini (quarterfinalist)
6. (United States) Mary Joe Fernández (withdrew)
7. (United States) Jennifer Capriati (first round)
8. (Czech Republic) Jana Novotná (fourth round)
9. (Germany) Anke Huber (third round)
10. (Bulgaria) Magdalena Maleeva (fourth round)
11. (Switzerland) Manuela Maleeva (semifinalist)
12. (Czech Republic) Helena Suková (finalist)
13. (France) Mary Pierce (fourth round)
14. (France) Nathalie Tauziat (fourth round)
15. (South Africa) Amanda Coetzer (third round)
16. (United States) Zina Garrison (third round)

== Draw ==
=== Key ===
- Q = Qualifier
- WC = Wild card
- LL = Lucky loser
- Alt = Alternate
- ITF = ITF entry
- PR = Protected ranking
- SR = Special ranking
- SE = Special exempt
- JE = Junior exempt
- JR = Junior Accelerator Programme entrant
- CO = College Accelerator Programme entrant
- NG = Next Gen Accelerator Program entrant
- w/o = Walkover
- r = Retired
- d = Defaulted

=== Finals ===
Quarterfinals
1	(Germany) Steffi Graf	6	5	6
5	(Argentina) Gabriela Sabatini	2	7	1
11	(Switzerland) Manuela Maleeva-Fragnière	7	7
(Japan) Kimiko Date	5	5
(Bulgaria) Katerina Maleeva	4	7^{7}	3
12	(Czech Republic) Helena Suková	6	6^{3}	6
(Belarus) Natasha Zvereva	0^{r}
2	(Spain) Arantxa Sánchez Vicario	3

Semifinals
1	(Germany) Steffi Graf	4	6	6
11	(Switzerland) Manuela Maleeva-Fragnière	6	1	0
12	(Czech Republic) Helena Suková	6^{7}	7	6
2	(Spain) Arantxa Sánchez Vicario	7^{9}	5	2

Finals
1	(Germany) Steffi Graf	6	6
12	(Czech Republic) Helena Suková	3	3

=== Top half ===
==== Section 1 ====
First round
1	(Germany) S Graf	6	6
(United States) R White	3	0
(United States) M McGrath	6	6^{4}	6
(France) P Paradis-Mangon	2	7^{7}	4
(Netherlands) C Wegink	5	6	6
(Italy) S Farina	7	4	2
(Austria) J Wiesner	7	4	6
(Australia) M Jaggard-Lai	5	6	4
(Germany) S Meier	6^{5}	6	6
(Croatia) N Ercegović	7^{7}	4	4
(Netherlands) B Schultz	6	7^{7}
(Paraguay) R de los Ríos	2	6^{5}
(United States) N Arendt	6	6
(Czech Republic) K Kroupova	0	3
13	(France) M Pierce	6	6^{2}	7^{7}
(Italy) N Baudone	0	7^{7}	6^{5}

Second round
1	(Germany) S Graf	6	6
(United States) M McGrath	3	1
(Netherlands) C Wegink	0	2
(Austria) J Wiesner	6	6
(Germany) S Meier	2	3
(Netherlands) B Schultz	6	6
(United States) N Arendt	2	4
13	(France) M Pierce	6	6

Third round
1	(Germany) S Graf
(Austria) J Wiesner	w/o
(Netherlands) B Schultz	5	6^{3}
13	(France) M Pierce	7	7^{7}

Fourth round
1	(Germany) S Graf	6	6
13	(France) M Pierce	1	0

==== Section 2 ====
First round
15	(South Africa) A Coetzer	6	6
(Australia) N Provis	3	2
(Chinese Taipei) S-t Wang	6	6
(Netherlands) S Rottier	0	2
(Canada) P Hy	4	6	7
(Japan) N Sawamatsu	6	1	5
(United States) L Davenport	6	6
(Germany) W Probst	4	2
(France) J Halard	6	7^{7}
Q	(Netherlands) P Kamstra	4	6^{4}
(United States) G Helgeson	7	6
WC	(United States) J Watanabe	5	4
(Canada) R Simpson-Alter	7^{7}	6
(Canada) H Kelesi	6^{5}	3
5	(Argentina) G Sabatini	6	6
(United States) P Fendick	3	1

Second round
15	(South Africa) A Coetzer	6	6
(Chinese Taipei) S-t Wang	1	3
(Canada) P Hy	4	2
(United States) L Davenport	6	6
(France) J Halard	5	1
(United States) G Helgeson	7	6
(Canada) R Simpson-Alter	3	0
5	(Argentina) G Sabatini	6	6

Third round
15	(South Africa) A Coetzer	1	2
(United States) L Davenport	6	6
(United States) G Helgeson	6	2	4
5	(Argentina) G Sabatini	4	6	6

Fourth round
(United States) L Davenport	7^{7}	4	4
5	(Argentina) G Sabatini	6^{1}	6	6

==== Section 3 ====
First round
4	(Spain) C Martínez	6	6
(France) S Testud	2	3
(United States) A Frazier	3	6	7
(United States) P Shriver	6	3	5
(Japan) K Nagatsuka	3	6	6
(Czech Republic) R Bobková	6	0	2
(Netherlands) N Krijger-Jagerman	6	6
(Czech Republic) A Strnadová	4	4
(Germany) S Hack	6	6
(Argentina) P Tarabini	0	2
(France) K Quentrec	6	1	6
(United Kingdom) J Durie	4	6	4
(United States) S Stafford	6	7^{7}
WC	(United States) H Cioffi	4	6^{1}
11	(Switzerland) M Maleeva-Fragnière	6	6
(Latvia) L Neiland	3	3

Second round
4	(Spain) C Martínez	6	6
(United States) A Frazier	1	0
(Japan) K Nagatsuka	4	2
(Netherlands) N Krijger-Jagerman	6	6
(Germany) S Hack	6	6
(France) K Quentrec	0	1
(United States) S Stafford	6^{4}	0
11	(Switzerland) M Man Maleeva-Fragnière	7^{7}	6

Third round
4	(Spain) C Martínez	6	6
(Netherlands) N Krijger-Jagerman	3	1
(Germany) S Hack	4	3
11	(Switzerland) M Man Maleeva-Fragnière	6	6

Fourth round
4	(Spain) C Martínez	6	0	2
11	(Switzerland) M Maleeva-Fragnière	1	6	6

==== Section 4 ====
First round
9	(Germany) A Huber	6	6
(Germany) K Kschwendt	2	2
(United Kingdom) C Wood	6	6
(Netherlands) M Oremans	3	1
(Japan) K Date	1	6	6
WC	(United States) K Adams	6	1	1
WC	(United States) A Keller	6^{5}	6	6
(Austria) B Reinstadler	7^{7}	2	0
(Italy) L Golarsa	6	6
(Romania) R Dragomir	2	3
(France) A Fusai	6	6
(United States) K Rinaldi	4	3
(Croatia) I Majoli	6	6
(Australia) R McQuillan	3	3
8	(Czech Republic) J Novotná	6	6
(Mexico) A Gavaldón	2	4

Second round
9	(Germany) A Huber	6	6
(United Kingdom) C Wood	4	4
(Japan) K Date	6	6
WC	(United States) A Keller	4	0
(Italy) L Golarsa	6	6
(France) A Fusai	3	1
(Croatia) I Majoli	3	0
8	(Czech Republic) J Novotná	6	6

Third round
9	(Germany) A Huber	3	2
(Japan) K Date	6	6
(Italy) L Golarsa	4	3
8	(Czech Republic) J Novotná	6	6

Fourth round
(Japan) K Date	6	6
8	(Czech Republic) J Novotná	4	4

=== Bottom half ===
==== Section 5 ====
First round
(Georgia (country)) L Meskhi	1	6	6
7	(United States) J Capriati	6	4	4
(Bulgaria) K Maleeva	3	6	6
(France) N van Lottum	6	3	0
(United States) G Fernández	2	6	6
(United States) D Graham	6	4	4
(United States) L McNeil	6	6
WC	(United States) J Steven	3	3
WC	(United States) S Cacic	2	6	6
(Germany) C Porwik	6	3	2
(United States) K Po	6	6
(South Africa) R Fairbank-Nideffer	3	4
(South Africa) E Reinach	7	6
(United States) A Grossman	5	2
10	(Bulgaria) M Maleeva	7	6
(United States) M Werdel	5	4

Second round
(Georgia (country)) L Meskhi	1	2
(Bulgaria) K Maleeva	6	6
(United States) G Fernández	6	6
(United States) L McNeil	2	3
WC	(United States) S Cacic	3	2
(United States) K Po	6	6
(South Africa) E Reinach	6	5	6^{5}
10	(Bulgaria) M Maleeva	1	7	7^{7}

Third round
(Bulgaria) K Maleeva	6	6
(United States) G Fernández	1	1
(United States) K Po	6	3	4
10	(Bulgaria) M Maleeva	2	6	6

Fourth round
(Bulgaria) K Maleeva	6	6
10	(Bulgaria) M Maleeva	2	3

==== Section 6 ====
First round
12	(Czech Republic) H Suková	6	3	7^{7}
Q	(Netherlands) M Bollegraf	4	6	6^{4}
(Ukraine) N Medvedeva	6	6
Q	(Japan) Y Kamio	1	4
Q	(Slovakia) K Habšudová	2	6	6
(Slovakia) R Zrubáková	6	3	2
(Belgium) D Monami	7^{7}	6
(Italy) MF Bentivoglio	6^{4}	2
(Italy) AM Cecchini	6	7^{7}
(Belgium) S Wasserman	4	6^{2}
(Germany) B Rittner	6	6
(China) F Li	3	0
(Belgium) S Appelmans	7	6
(Indonesia) Y Basuki	5	4
3	(United States) M Navratilova	6	6
(Italy) G Pizzichini	0	1

Second round
12	(Czech Republic) H Suková	6	6
(Ukraine) N Medvedeva	3	4
Q	(Slovakia) K Habšudová	6	6
(Belgium) D Monami	3	4
(Italy) AM Cecchini	1	2
(Germany) B Rittner	6	6
(Belgium) S Appelmans	1	3
3	(United States) M Navratilova	6	6

Third round
12	(Czech Republic) H Suková	3	6	6
Q	(Slovakia) K Habšudová	6	2	4
(Germany) B Rittner	4	6	2
3	(United States) M Navratilova	6	4	6

Fourth round
12	(Czech Republic) H Suková	7	6
3	(United States) M Navratilova	5	4

==== Section 7 ====
First round
LL	(Argentina) MJ Gaidano	6	5	6
Q	(Brazil) A Vieira	2	7	0
(Switzerland) E Zardo	6	6
(Greece) C Papadáki	1	1
(Australia) K Radford	3	7^{7}	6
(United States) C Kuhlman	6	6^{5}	3
Q	(Australia) J Byrne	7	6
(Peru) L Gildemeister	5	4
(Belarus) N Zvereva	6	6
(Australia) E Smylie	3	2
(United States) L Raymond	6	7^{8}
(Italy) L Ferrando	3	6^{6}
(United States) T Whitlinger	6	6
WC	(United States) J Lee	1	1
16	(United States) Z Garrison	6	6
(Spain) V Ruano Pascual	1	2

Second round
LL	(Argentina) MJ Gaidano	6	6
(Switzerland) E Zardo	4	1
(Australia) K Radford	6	1	4
Q	(Australia) J Byrne	3	6	6
(Belarus) N Zvereva	6	6
(United States) L Raymond	4	1
(United States) T Whitlinger	2	3
16	(United States) Z Garrison	6	6

Third round
LL	(Argentina) MJ Gaidano	2	6	6
Q	(Australia) Byrne	6	2	3
(Belarus) N Zvereva	6	6
16	(United States) Z Garrison	4	3

Fourth round
LL	(Argentina) MJ Gaidano	0	2
(Belarus) N Zvereva	6	6

==== Section 8 ====
First round
14	(France) N Tauziat	1	6	6
(Ukraine) E Brioukhovets	6	4	1
(Netherlands) K Boogert	6	6
Q	(United States) J Ingram	1	4
(Germany) C Singer	7^{7}	6
(Finland) N Dahlman	6^{5}	4
(Germany) M Babel	7	6
(Germany) S Frankl	5	1
(United States) C Rubin	6	6
(Germany) V Martinek	4	3
Q	(Kazakhstan) E Likhovtseva	6	6
WC	(United States) A Leand	3	2
(United States) L Harvey-Wild	6	6
(Argentina) I Gorrochategui	2	0
2	(Spain) A Sánchez Vicario	6	6
(Argentina) F Labat	4	3

Second round
14	(France) N Tauziat	6	6
(Netherlands) K Boogert	1	4
(Germany) C Singer	7^{7}	6
(Germany) M Babel	6^{4}	2
(United States) C Rubin	6	6
Q	(Kazakhstan) E Likhovtseva	4	3
(United States) L Harvey-Wild	2	2
2	(Spain) A Sánchez Vicario	6	6

Third round
14	(France) N Tauziat	6	6
(Germany) C Singer	3	2
(United States) C Rubin	0	1
2	(Spain) A Sánchez Vicario	6	6

Fourth round
14	(France) N Tauziat	4	3
2	(Spain) A Sánchez Vicario	6	6

Preceded by 1993 Wimbledon Championships – Women's singles	Grand Slam women's singles	Succeeded by 1994 Australian Open – Women's singles
