= 1992 Torneo Internazionale Femminile di Palermo – Singles =

Singles
- 1992 Torneo Internazionale Femminile di Palermo

Final
- Champion: (France) Mary Pierce
- Runner-up: (Netherlands) Brenda Schultz
- Score: 6–1, 6–7^{(3–7)}, 6–1

Details
- Draw: 32 (2WC/4Q/1LL)
- Seeds: 8

Events
Singles	Doubles
← 1991 ·	Palermo Ladies Open	· 1993 →

Mary Pierce successfully defended her title by defeating Brenda Schultz 6–1, 6–7^{(3–7)}, 6–1 in the final.

== Seeds ==
1. (France) Mary Pierce (champion)
2. (Netherlands) Brenda Schultz (final)
3. (Switzerland) Emanuela Zardo (second round)
4. (Argentina) Mercedes Paz (second round)
5. (Australia) Jenny Byrne (first round)
6. (Italy) Katia Piccolini (first round)
7. (France) Sandrine Testud (first round)
8. (France) Catherine Mothes (quarterfinals)

== Draw ==
=== Key ===
- Q = Qualifier
- WC = Wild card
- LL = Lucky loser
- Alt = Alternate
- SE = Special exempt
- PR = Protected ranking
- ITF = ITF entry
- JE = Junior exempt
- w/o = Walkover
- r = Retired
- d = Defaulted
- SR = Special ranking

=== Finals ===
Semifinals
1	(France) Mary Pierce	6	6
(Italy) Silvia Farina	2	2
Q	(Socialist Federal Republic of Yugoslavia) Nadin Ercegović	4	2
2	(Netherlands) Brenda Schultz	6	6

Final
1	(France) Mary Pierce	6	6^{3}	6
2	(Netherlands) Brenda Schultz	1	7^{7}	1

=== Top half ===
First round
1	(France) M Pierce	6	6
(Czechoslovakia) R Bobková	4	1
WC	(Italy) F Perfetti	4	7^{9}	4
(Czechoslovakia) K Kroupová	6	6^{7}	6
LL	(France) N Guerrée	1	1
(Italy) F Bonsignori	6	6
(Czechoslovakia) P Langrová	6^{6}	6	6
6	(Italy) K Piccolini	7^{8}	3	4
4	(Argentina) M Paz	6	6
(Socialist Federal Republic of Yugoslavia) B Mulej	1	4
Q	(Netherlands) E Hoogendoorn	6^{5}	6^{4}
(Italy) S Farina	7^{7}	7^{7}
(Bulgaria) E Pampoulova-Wagner	4	3
(Czechoslovakia) P Holubová	6	6
(France) S Niox-Château	7^{7}	3	1
8	(France) C Mothes	6^{3}	6	6

Second round
1	(France) M Pierce	6	7^{7}
(Czechoslovakia) K Kroupová	3	6^{5}
(Italy) F Bonsignori	2	7	3
(Czechoslovakia) P Langrová	6	5	6
4	(Argentina) M Paz	3	4
(Italy) S Farina	6	6
(Czechoslovakia) P Holubová	6	4	2
8	(France) C Mothes	2	6	6

Quarterfinals
1	(France) M Pierce	6	7^{7}
(Czechoslovakia) P Langrová	1	6^{3}
(Italy) S Farina	6	6
8	(France) C Mothes	1	1

Semifinals
1	(France) M Pierce	6	6
(Italy) S Farina	2	2

=== Bottom half ===
First round
5	(Australia) J Byrne	6^{8}	6	5
(Austria) P Ritter	7^{10}	2	7
(Germany) K Oeljeklaus	1	0
Q	(Socialist Federal Republic of Yugoslavia) N Ercegović	6	6
(United States) B Bowes	6	3	3
(United States) H Cioffi	4	6	6
(Argentina) P Tarabini	3	5
3	(Switzerland) E Zardo	6	7
7	(France) S Testud	1	6	1
Q	(Italy) F Romano	6	2	6
Q	(France) A Fusai	4	1
(Italy) N Baudone	6	6
(Italy) L Garrone	4	4
WC	(Italy) G Pizzichini	6	6
(Germany) M Živec-Škulj	1	6	3
2	(Netherlands) B Schultz	6	3	6

Second round
(Austria) P Ritter	6^{3}	6	4
Q	(Socialist Federal Republic of Yugoslavia) N Ercegović	7^{7}	2	6
(United States) H Cioffi	6	1	6
3	(Switzerland) E Zardo	1	6	1
Q	(Italy) F Romano	4	4
(Italy) N Baudone	6	6
WC	(Italy) G Pizzichini	2	3
2	(Netherlands) B Schultz	6	6

Quarterfinals
Q	(Socialist Federal Republic of Yugoslavia) N Ercegović	6	6
(United States) H Cioffi	1	3
(Italy) N Baudone	2	4
2	(Netherlands) B Schultz	6	6

Semifinals
Q	(Socialist Federal Republic of Yugoslavia) N Ercegović	4	2
2	(Netherlands) B Schultz	6	6
