= 1992 Torneo Internazionale Femminile di Palermo – Doubles =

Doubles
- 1992 Torneo Internazionale Femminile di Palermo

Final
- Champions: (United States) Halle Cioffi (Argentina) María José Gaidano
- Runners-up: (Czechoslovakia) Petra Langrová (Spain) Ana Segura
- Score: 6–3, 4–6, 6–3

Details
- Draw: 16
- Seeds: 4

Events
Singles	Doubles
← 1991 ·	Palermo Ladies Open	· 1993 →

Mary Pierce and Petra Langrová were the defending champions, but Pierce chose to focus on the singles tournament only, defeating Brenda Schultz in the final.

Langrová teamed up with Ana Segura and lost in the final to Halle Cioffi and María José Gaidano. The score was 6–3, 4–6, 6–3.

== Seeds ==
1. (Argentina) Mercedes Paz / (Argentina) Patricia Tarabini (semifinals)
2. (Italy) Silvia Farina / (France) Sandrine Testud (first round)
3. (United States) Beverly Bowes / (Italy) Laura Garrone (quarterfinals)
4. (Czechoslovakia) Petra Langrová / (Spain) Ana Segura (final)

== Draw ==
=== Key ===
- Q = Qualifier
- WC = Wild card
- LL = Lucky loser
- Alt = Alternate
- SE = Special exempt
- PR = Protected ranking
- ITF = ITF entry
- JE = Junior exempt
- w/o = Walkover
- r = Retired
- d = Defaulted
- SR = Special ranking

=== Draw ===
First round
1	(Argentina) M Paz (Argentina) P Tarabini	6	6
(Czechoslovakia) P Holubová (Czechoslovakia) K Kroupová	3	3
(Italy) N Baudone (Italy) K Piccolini	6	6
(France) S Niox-Château (Switzerland) E Zardo	2	3
4	(Czechoslovakia) P Langrová (Spain) A Segura	6	6^{5}	6
(United States) A Gooden (Australia) J Hodder	4	7^{7}	1
(Italy) C Cavina (Italy) G Mugnaini	3	2
(Italy) E Savoldi (Italy) Ad Serra Zanetti	6	6
(Germany) K Oeljeklaus (Germany) M Živec-Škulj	2	3
(Bulgaria) E Pampoulova-Wagner (Austria) P Ritter	6	6
(France) A Fusai (Switzerland) N Tschan	5	3
3	(United States) B Bowes (Italy) L Garrone	7	6
(Italy) F Perfetti (Italy) G Pizzichini	4	6	6
(Italy) F Bonsignori (Italy) F Romano	6	3	3
(United States) H Cioffi (Argentina) MJ Gaidano	6	6
2	(Italy) S Farina (France) S Testud	4	3

Quarterfinals
1	(Argentina) M Paz (Argentina) P Tarabini	6	6
(Italy) N Baudone (Italy) K Piccolini	4	2
4	(Czechoslovakia) P Langrová (Spain) A Segura	6	6
(Italy) E Savoldi (Italy) Ad Serra Zanetti	3	1
(Bulgaria) E Pampoulova-Wagner (Austria) P Ritter	7^{7}	6^{2}	6
3	(United States) B Bowes (Italy) L Garrone	6^{4}	7^{7}	4
(Italy) F Perfetti (Italy) G Pizzichini	6	5	3
(United States) H Cioffi (Argentina) MJ Gaidano	1	7	6

Semifinals
1	(Argentina) M Paz (Argentina) P Tarabini	6	6^{6}	4
4	(Czechoslovakia) P Langrová (Spain) A Segura	2	7^{8}	6
(Bulgaria) E Pampoulova-Wagner (Austria) P Ritter	4	4
(United States) H Cioffi (Argentina) MJ Gaidano	6	6

Final
4	(Czechoslovakia) P Langrová (Spain) A Segura	3	6	3
(United States) H Cioffi (Argentina) MJ Gaidano	6	4	6
