= 1994 Torneo Internazional Femmin di Palermo =

- Date: 5–10 July
- Edition: 7th
- Category: Tier IV
- Draw: 32S / 16D
- Prize money: $107,500
- Surface: Clay / outdoor
- Location: Palermo, Italy
- Venue: Country Time Club

Champions

Singles
- (Romania) Irina Spîrlea

Doubles
- (Romania) Ruxandra Dragomir / (Italy) Laura Garrone
← 1993 ·	Torneo Internazional Femmin di Palermo	· 1995 →

The 1994 Torneo Internazional Femmin di Palermo was a women's tennis tournament played on outdoor clay courts at the Country Time Club in Palermo, Italy that was part of the Tier IV category of the 1994 WTA Tour. It was the seventh edition of the tournament and was held from 5 July until 10 July 1994. Second-seeded Irina Spîrlea won the singles title and earned $18,000 first-prize money.

== Finals ==
=== Singles ===
(Romania) Irina Spîrlea defeated (Netherlands) Brenda Schultz 6–4, 1–6, 7–6^{(7–5)}

- It was Spîrlea's 1st singles title of her career.

=== Doubles ===
(Romania) Ruxandra Dragomir / (Italy) Laura Garrone defeated (Italy) Alice Canepa / (Italy) Giulia Casoni 6–1, 6–0
