= 1996 Internazionali Femminili di Palermo =

- Date: 15–21 July
- Edition: 9th
- Category: Tier IV
- Draw: 32S / 16D
- Prize money: $107,500
- Surface: Clay / outdoor
- Location: Palermo, Italy

Champions

Singles
- (Austria) Barbara Schett

Doubles
- (Slovakia) Janette Husárová / (Austria) Barbara Schett
← 1995 ·	Internazionali Femminili di Palermo	· 1997 →

The 1996 Internazionali Femminili di Palermo was a women's tennis tournament played on outdoor clay courts in Palermo, Italy that was part of Tier IV of the 1996 WTA Tour. It was the ninth edition of the tournament and was held from 15 July until 21 July 1996. Fourth-seeded Barbara Schett won the singles title.

== Finals ==
=== Singles ===
(Austria) Barbara Schett defeated (Germany) Sabine Hack 6–3, 6–3

- It was Schett's 1st title of the year and the 1st of her career.

=== Doubles ===
(Slovakia) Janette Husárová / (Austria) Barbara Schett defeated (Argentina) Florencia Labat / (Germany) Barbara Rittner 6–1, 6–2

- It was Husárová's 1st title of the year and the 1st of her career. It was Schett's 2nd title of the year and the 2nd of her career.
