= 1993 Torneo Internazionale Femminile di Palermo =

- Date: 6–11 July
- Edition: 6th
- Category: Tier IV
- Draw: 32S / 16D
- Prize money: $100,000
- Surface: Clay / outdoor
- Location: Palermo, Italy
- Venue: Country Time Club

Champions

Singles
- (Czechoslovakia) Radka Bobková

Doubles
- (Germany) Karin Kschwendt; (Ukraine) Natalia Medvedeva
← 1992 ·	Torneo Internazionale Femminile di Palermo	· 1994 →

The 1993 Torneo Internazionale Femminile di Palermo was a women's tennis tournament played on outdoor clay courts at the Country Time Club in Palermo, Italy that was part of the Tier IV category of the 1993 WTA Tour. It was the sixth edition of the tournament and was held from 6 July until 11 July 1993. Unseeded Radka Bobková won the singles title and earned $18,000 first-prize money.

== Finals ==
=== Singles ===
(Czechoslovakia) Radka Bobková defeated (France) Mary Pierce 6–3, 6–2

- It was Bobková's 2nd singles title of the year and of her career.

=== Doubles ===
(Germany) Karin Kschwendt / (Ukraine) Natalia Medvedeva defeated (Italy) Silvia Farina / (Netherlands) Brenda Schultz 6–4, 7–6^{(7–4)}
