= 1992 Torneo Internazionale Femminile di Palermo =

- Date: 6–12 July
- Edition: 5th
- Category: Tier V
- Draw: 32S / 16D
- Prize money: $100,000
- Surface: Clay / outdoor
- Location: Palermo, Italy
- Venue: Country Time Club

Champions

Singles
- (France) Mary Pierce

Doubles
- (United States) Halle Cioffi (Argentina) María José Gaidano
← 1991 ·	Torneo Internazionale Femminile di Palermo	· 1993 →

The 1992 Torneo Internazionale Femminile di Palermo was a women's tennis tournament played on outdoor clay courts at the Country Time Club in Palermo, Italy that was part of the Tier V category of the 1992 WTA Tour. It was the fifth edition of the tournament and was held from 6 July until 12 July 1992. First-seeded Mary Pierce won the singles title and earned $18,000 first-prize money.

== Finals ==
=== Singles ===
(France) Mary Pierce defeated (Netherlands) Brenda Schultz 6–1, 6–7^{(3–7)}, 6–1

- It was Pierce's 2nd singles title of the year and the 3rd of her career.

=== Doubles ===
(United States) Halle Cioffi / (Argentina) María José Gaidano defeated (Czechoslovakia) Petra Langrová / (Spain) Ana Segura 6–3, 4–6, 6–3
