= Sandra van der Aa =

Dutch tennis player

- Full name: Sandra van der Aa
- Country (sports): Netherlands
- Born: 28 June 1972 (age 52)
- Retired: 1995
- Prize money: $30,292

Singles
- Career record: 48–80
- Career titles: 0
- Highest ranking: No. 263 (16 November 1992)

Doubles
- Career record: 37–46
- Career titles: 2 ITF
- Highest ranking: No. 211 (6 June 1994)

Sandra van der Aa (born 28 June 1972) is a former professional tennis player from the Netherlands. On 16 November 1992, she reached her highest singles ranking of 263 by the Women's Tennis Association (WTA).

In 1993, her only WTA Tour main-draw appearance came at the Palermo Open, where she partnered with her countrywoman Seda Noorlander in the doubles event. They lost in the quarterfinals to the pair of the Dutch Ingelise Driehuis and the Mexican player Lupita Novelo.

== ITF finals ==
$25,000 tournaments
$10,000 tournaments

=== Singles: 1 (0-1) ===
Result	No.	Date	Tournament	Surface	Opponent	Score
Loss	1.	14 September 1992	Allianz Cup, Bulgaria	Clay	(Germany) Heike Rusch	3–6, 6–4, 3–6

=== Doubles: 6 (2–4) ===
Result	No.	Date	Tournament	Surface	Partner	Opponents	Score
Win	1.	7 July 1991	ITF Båstad, Sweden	Clay	(Netherlands) Seda Noorlander	(Hungary) Antonia Homolya (Denmark) Karin Ptaszek	6–3, 6–4
Loss	2.	12 August 1991	ITF Rebecq, Belgium	Clay	(Netherlands) Seda Noorlander	(Poland) Katarzyna Teodorowicz (Poland) Agata Werblińska	2–6, 7–5, 2–6
Loss	3.	5 April 1993	ITF Athens, Greece	Clay	(Netherlands) Annemarie Mikkers	(Croatia) Darija Dešković (Slovenia) Karin Lušnic	3–6, 6–7^{(5)}
Win	4.	13 June 1993	ITF Ashkelon, Israel	Hard	(Netherlands) Seda Noorlander	(Israel) Yael Segal (Finland) Petra Thorén	6–4, 6–4
Loss	5.	10 April 1994	ITF Athens, Greece	Clay	(Bulgaria) Lubomira Bacheva	(Slovakia) Patrícia Marková (Slovakia) Simona Nedorostová	3–6, 0–6
Loss	6.	8 August 1994	ITF Rebecq, Belgium	Clay	(Netherlands) Stephanie Gomperts	(Spain) Elisa Peñalvo López (Netherlands) Henriëtte van Aalderen	6–0, 6–7^{(3)}, 2–6
