= Stephanie Devillé =

Belgian tennis player

- Country (sports): Belgium
- Born: 24 July 1976 (age 48); Antwerp, Belgium
- Plays: Right-handed
- Prize money: $135,959

Singles
- Career record: 168–131
- Highest ranking: No. 61 (17 March 1997)

Grand Slam singles results
- Australian Open: 2R (1997)
- French Open: 1R (1997)
- Wimbledon: 1R (1997)
- US Open: 1R (1996)

Doubles
- Career record: 27–42
- Highest ranking: No. 182 (14 July 1997)

Stephanie Devillé (born 24 July 1976) is a former professional tennis player from Belgium.

== Biography ==
Born in Antwerp, Devillé began playing tennis at the age of six and was coached by Christophe Delzenne. She was a member of the Belgian team which won the 1992 World Youth Cup (now known as Junior Fed Cup), along with Laurence Courtois and Nancy Feber.

In 1996 she had her breakthrough year on tour. After winning ITF tournaments in Bordeaux and Budapest, she made her WTA Tour main draw debut in Palermo, as a qualifier. She defeated Sandra Cecchini in the first round, then was rewarded her second round match against Irina Spîrlea when the Romanian was defaulted for swearing in the first game of the deciding set. Her run ended with a three-set loss to Jana Kandarr in the quarter-finals. She improved on that performance by making the semi-finals of the Styrian Open later in the season, then made it through qualifying at the 1996 US Open to feature in the main draw of a grand slam for the first time. She won her third ITF title of the year at Sedona and improved her ranking from 279 to 74 by the end of the season.

At the 1997 Australian Open she overcame Denisa Chládková in the first round, 8–6 in the third set, then suffered the disappointment of having to retire injured against Arantxa Sánchez Vicario in the second round. With only one game completed, Devillé went down with a sprained ankle and was unable to carry on. She didn't return to action until March and that month reached her career best ranking of 61. From 1998 she played mainly on the ITF circuit.

Devillé has commentated on tennis for RTBF and also coaches tennis locally.

== ITF Circuit finals ==
$50,000 tournaments
$25,000 tournaments
$10,000 tournaments

=== Singles: 11 (8–3) ===
Result	No.	Date	Tournament	Surface	Opponent	Score
Win	1.	14 June 1993	Aveiro, Portugal	Clay	(France) Olivia de Camaret	6–3, 4–6, 6–7^{(7)}
Loss	2.	16 August 1993	Koksijde, Belgium	Clay	(Argentina) Mariana Díaz Oliva	1–6, 3–6
Loss	3.	8 August 1994	Rebecq, Belgium	Clay	(Hungary) Réka Vidáts	2–6, 6–3, 3–6
Loss	4.	21 August 1994	Koksijde, Belgium	Clay	(Luxembourg) Anne Kremer	1–6, 4–6
Win	5.	14 August 1995	Carthage, Tunisia	Clay	(Argentina) Cintia Tortorella	6–2, 7–5
Win	6.	13 May 1996	Bordeaux, France	Clay	(France) Anne-Gaëlle Sidot	6–4, 7–5
Winner	7.	16 July 1996	Budapest, Hungary	Clay	(Netherlands) Noëlle van Lottum	6–2, 6–2
Win	8.	7 October 1996	Sedona, United States	Hard	(United States) Laxmi Poruri	1–6, 6–2, 7–6^{(5)}
Win	9.	2 November 1998	Moulins, France	Hard	(France) Berengere Karpenschif	1–6, 6–4, 6–1
Win	10.	19 April 1999	Gelos, France	Clay	(Spain) Marta Marrero	3–6, 6–1, 7–5
Win	11.	26 June 2000	Velp, Netherlands	Clay	(Austria) Nicole Melch	7–6^{(4)}, 6–1

=== Doubles: 1 (1–0) ===
Result	No.	Date	Tournament	Surface	Partner	Opponents	Score
Winner	1.	20 July 1998	Brussels, Belgium	Clay	(Belgium) Kim Clijsters	(Russia) Maria Boboedova (Latvia) Elena Krutko	6–1, 7–5
