= Monica Guglielmi =

Italian tennis player

- Country (sports): Italy
- Born: 2 September 1974 (age 50)
- Plays: Right-handed
- Prize money: $12,882

Singles
- Career record: 44–56
- Highest ranking: No. 406 (11 Sep 1995)

Doubles
- Career record: 23–25
- Highest ranking: No. 431 (1 Apr 1996)

Monica Guglielmi (born 2 September 1974) is an Italian former professional tennis player.

Guglielmi was active on tour in the 1990s and had a best singles ranking of 406. She made her only WTA Tour main draw appearance in 1992 at the Cesena Championships, where she was beaten in the first round by Laura Golarsa.

== ITF finals ==
=== Singles: 2 (0–2) ===
Outcome	No.	Date	Tournament	Surface	Opponent	Score
Runner-up	1.	18 June 1995	Fontanafredda, Italy	Clay	(Italy) Giulia Casoni	6–7, 6–7
Runner-up	2.	3 September 1995	Marina di Massa, Italy	Clay	(Japan) Yuka Tanaka	6–1, 3–6, 2–6
