= Susanna Attili =

Italian tennis player

- Country (sports): Italy
- Born: 7 March 1973 (age 52)
- Prize money: $23,727

Singles
- Highest ranking: No. 407 (20 September 1993)

Doubles
- Career titles: 1 ITF
- Highest ranking: No. 131 (15 August 1994)

Grand Slam doubles results
- US Open: 1R (1994)

Susanna Attili (born 7 March 1973) is an Italian former professional tennis player.

In the early 1990s, Attili competed at WTA Tour level as a doubles specialist and reached a best doubles ranking of 131 in the world. She featured in the main draw of the 1994 US Open, with regular partner Elena Savoldi.

Attili is married to former ATP Tour player Francesco Cinà, who coached Roberta Vinci to the 2015 US Open final.

== ITF finals ==
$75,000 tournaments
$25,000 tournaments
$10,000 tournaments

=== Doubles: 5 (1–4) ===
Result	No.	Date	Tournament	Surface	Partner	Opponents	Score
Loss	1.	18 February 1991	Lisbon, Portugal	Clay	(Italy) Antonella Canapi	(Czechoslovakia) Klára Bláhová (Czechoslovakia) Monika Kratochvílová	6–7^{(2–7)}, 7–6^{(7–5)}, 5–7
Win	1.	18 January 1993	Helsinki, Finland	Carpet	(Italy) Elena Savoldi	(Sweden) Maria Ekstrand (Belgium) Vanessa Matthys	5–7, 6–3, 6–3
Loss	2.	10 May 1993	Putignano, Italy	Hard	(Italy) Elena Savoldi	(Czech Republic) Eva Melicharová (Czech Republic) Ivana Jankovská	3–6, 7–6^{(8–6)}, 4–6
Loss	3.	6 September 1993	Spoleto, Italy	Clay	(Italy) Elena Savoldi	(Ukraine) Olga Lugina (Paraguay) Larissa Schaerer	5–7, 6–7^{(5–7)}
Loss	4.	27 March 1994	Brest, France	Hard	(Italy) Elena Savoldi	(Denmark) Karin Ptaszek (Belgium) Els Callens	4–6, 1–6
