= María José Gaidano =

Argentine tennis player and coach

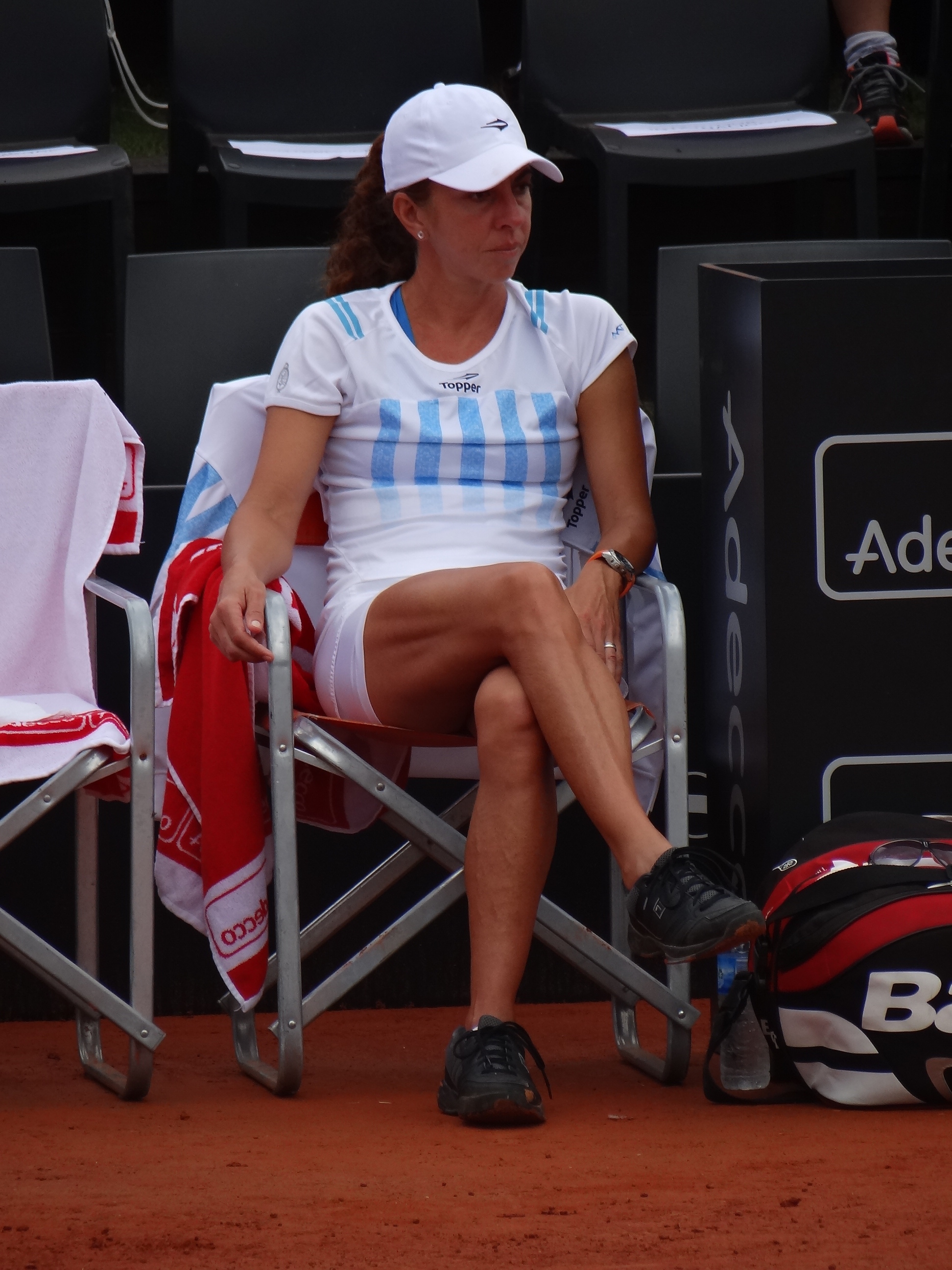
- Country (sports): Argentina
- Residence: Buenos Aires, Argentina
- Born: 25 May 1973 (age 52) Buenos Aires
- Height: 1.71 m (5 ft 7 1/2 in)
- Turned pro: 1992
- Retired: 2000
- Plays: Right-handed (two-handed backhand)
- Prize money: $299,016

Singles
- Career record: 214–171
- Career titles: 0
- Highest ranking: 85 (4 October 1993)

Grand Slam singles results
- Australian Open: 1R (1994, 1996)
- French Open: 2R (1995)
- Wimbledon: 2R (1994)
- US Open: 4R (1993)

Doubles
- Career record: 64–87
- Career titles: 2
- Highest ranking: 87 (5 July 1993)

Grand Slam doubles results
- Australian Open: 1R (1994)
- French Open: 2R (1993)
- US Open: 1R (1993)

María José Gaidano (born 25 March 1973) is an Argentine tennis coach and former professional tennis player.

She was born in Buenos Aires and played professionally from 1992 to 2000. Gaidona represented Argentina in the Fed Cup tournament in 1997.

== WTA career finals ==
=== Doubles 3 (2 titles, 1 runner-up) ===
Legend
Grand Slam
Tier I
Tier II
Tier III
Tier IV
Tier V

Result	Date	Tournament	Tier	Surface	Partner	Opponents	Score
Win	Jul 1992	Palermo Open, Italy	Tier V	Clay	(United States) Halle Cioffi	(Czechoslovakia) Petra Langrová (Spain) Ana Segura	6–3, 4–6, 6–3
Win	May 1993	Belgian Open	Tier IV	Clay	(Czech Republic) Radka Bobková	(Belgium) Ann Devries (Belgium) Dominique Monami	6–4, 2–6, 7–6
Loss	May 1997	Bol Open, Croatia	Tier IV	Clay	(Austria) Marion Maruska	(Argentina) Laura Montalvo (Slovakia) Henrieta Nagyová	3–6, 1–6

== ITF finals ==
$50,000 tournaments
$25,000 tournaments
$10,000 tournaments

=== Singles (1–4) ===
Result	No.	Date	Tournament	Surface	Opponent	Score
Win	1.	7 October 1990	ITF Bogotá, Colombia	Clay	(United States) Jolene Watanabe	0–6, 7–5, 6–2
Loss	1.	1 September 1991	ITF Belo Horizonte, Brazil	Clay	(Brazil) Andrea Vieira	3–6, 4–6
Loss	2.	21 October 1991	ITF Asunción, Paraguay	Clay	(Argentina) María Luciana Reynares	3–6, 1–6
Loss	3.	11 November 1991	ITF Rio de Janeiro, Brazil	Clay	(Austria) Ulrike Priller	3–6, 4–6
Loss	4.	4 August 1996	ITF Roanoke, United States	Hard	(United States) Karin Miller	6–1, 4–6, 0–6

=== Doubles (2–4) ===
Result	No.	Date	Tournament	Surface	Partner	Opponents	Score
Loss	1.	5 November 1990	ITF Asunción, Paraguay	Clay	(Uruguay) Patricia Miller	(Paraguay) Viviana Valdovinos (United States) Jolene Watanabe	6–3, 4–6, 6–7
Loss	2.	28 September 1991	ITF Biella, Italy	Clay	(Paraguay) Sandra Ugarriza	(Italy) Claudia Piccini (Italy) Elena Savoldi	1–6, 4–6
Win	1.	2 September 1991	ITF São Paulo, Brazil	Clay	(Argentina) Cintia Tortorella	(Paraguay) Rossana de los Ríos (Paraguay) Larissa Schaerer	7–6^{(2)}, 6–4
Win	2.	13 February 1995	ITF Bogotá, Colombia	Clay	(Brazil) Andrea Vieira	(United Kingdom) Joanne Moore (Colombia) Ximena Rodríguez	6–4, 1–6, 6–1
Loss	3.	31 March 1997	ITF Phoenix, United States	Hard	(Venezuela) María Vento-Kabchi	(France) Lea Ghirardi (Georgia (country)) Nino Louarsabishvili	0–6, 2–6
Loss	4.	6 September 1998	ITF Manaus, Brazil	Hard	(United Kingdom) Joanne Moore	(Brazil) Bruna Colósio (Brazil) Carla Tiene	6–3, 3–6, 4–6
