= Sabine Hack =

German tennis player

- Country (sports): West Germany; Germany
- Born: 12 July 1969 (age 55); Ulm, West Germany
- Height: 1.70 m (5 ft 7 in)
- Retired: 1997
- Prize money: US$941,566

Singles
- Career record: 235–172
- Career titles: 4 WTA, 1 ITF
- Highest ranking: No. 13 (16 January 1995)

Grand Slam singles results
- Australian Open: 4R (1994)
- French Open: QF (1994)
- Wimbledon: 2R (1992)
- US Open: 3R (1992, 1993)

Doubles
- Career record: 33–56
- Career titles: 1 WTA, 0 ITF
- Highest ranking: No. 94 (19 September 1994)

Grand Slam doubles results
- Australian Open: 3R (1991, 1995)
- French Open: 3R (1991, 1994)
- US Open: 3R (1994)

Sabine Hack (German pronunciation: [zaˈbiːnə ˈhak]; born 12 July 1969) is a former professional tennis player from Germany. She began her career on the WTA Tour in 1983. She won four singles and one doubles titles in her career. Her best Grand Slam performance was reaching the quarterfinals at the 1994 French Open. Hack reached a career-high ranking of No. 13 in the world in January 1995. She retired from the tour in 1997.

== WTA tour finals ==
=== Singles (4 titles, 4 runners-up) ===
Legend
Grand Slam (0)
WTA Championships (0)
Tier I (0)
Tier II (1)
Tier III (1)
Tier IV & V (2)

Result	W/L	Date	Tournament	Surface	Opponent	Score
Loss	0–1	Jul 1989	Båstad, Sweden	Clay	(Bulgaria) Katerina Maleeva	1–6, 3–6
Win	1–1	Dec 1991	São Paulo, Brazil	Clay	(Germany) Veronika Martinek	6–3, 7–5
Loss	1–2	Mar 1993	Houston, United States	Clay	(Spain) Conchita Martínez	3–6, 2–6
Win	2–2	Oct 1993	Curitiba, Brazil	Clay	(Argentina) Florencia Labat	6–2, 6–0
Win	3–2	Mar 1994	Houston, United States	Clay	(France) Mary Pierce	7–5, 6–4
Win	4–2	Jan 1995	Jakarta, Indonesia	Hard	(Romania) Irina Spîrlea	2–6, 7–6^{(8–6)}, 6–4
Loss	4–3	Jul 1995	Palermo, Italy	Clay	(Romania) Irina Spîrlea	6–7^{(1–7)}, 2–6
Loss	4–4	Jul 1996	Palermo, Italy	Clay	(Austria) Barbara Schett	3–6, 3–6

=== Doubles (1 title, 1 runner-up) ===
Result	W/L	Date	Tournament	Surface	Partner	Opponents	Score
Loss	0–1	Aug 1988	Athens, Greece	Clay	(West Germany) Silke Frankl	(Socialist Federal Republic of Yugoslavia) Sabrina Goleš (Austria) Judith Wiesner	2–6, 6–7^{(4–7)}
Win	1–1	Oct 1993	Curitiba, Brazil	Clay	(West Germany) Veronika Martinek	(Brazil) Cláudia Chabalgoity (Brazil) Andrea Vieira	6–2, 7–6^{(7–4)}

== ITF finals ==
=== Singles (1–3) ===
Legend
$10,000 tournaments

Outcome	No.	Date	Tournament	Surface	Opponent	Score
Runner-up	1.	15 October 1984	Haifa, Israel	Clay	(West Germany) Gabriela Dinu	6–3, 5–7, 4–6
Runner-up	2.	5 August 1985	Rheda, West Germany	Clay	(West Germany) Silke Meier	5–7, 4–6
Runner-up	3.	12 August 1985	Kitzbühel, Austria	Clay	(Netherlands) Nanette Schutte	4–6, 1–6
Winner	4.	23 September 1985	Sofia, Bulgaria	Clay	(Czechoslovakia) Hana Fukárková	6–1, 6–2

=== Doubles (0–1) ===
Outcome	No.	Date	Tournament	Surface	Partner	Opponents	Score
Runner-up	1.	2 November 1987	Telford, United Kingdom	Hard	(West Germany) Ingrid Peltzer	(Soviet Union) Eugenia Maniokova (Soviet Union) Natalia Medvedeva	0–6, 2–6
