= Alice Canepa =

Italian tennis player

- Country (sports): Italy
- Born: 30 April 1978 (age 47) Finale Ligure
- Height: 1.73 m (5 ft 8 in)
- Turned pro: July 1994
- Retired: July 2007
- Plays: Right-handed (two-handed backhand)
- Prize money: US$ 217,781

Singles
- Career record: 282–223
- Career titles: 5 ITF
- Highest ranking: No. 158 (17 April 2000)

Grand Slam singles results
- Australian Open: Q1 (1999, 2000, 2001, 2006)
- French Open: Q3 (2005)
- Wimbledon: Q1 (2000)
- US Open: Q2 (1998, 2005)

Doubles
- Career record: 194–124
- Career titles: 19 ITF
- Highest ranking: No. 93 (18 September 2000)

Grand Slam doubles results
- Australian Open: 2R (2001, 2003)
- French Open: 2R (2000)
- Wimbledon: 1R (2000)
- US Open: 2R (2000)

Alice Canepa (Italian pronunciation: [aˈliːtʃe ˈkaːnepa, - kaˈnɛː-]; born 30 April 1978) is a former professional tennis player from Italy.

Her highest singles and doubles rankings are No. 158 and No. 93, respectively.

== Biography ==
In her career, Canepa won a total of 24 titles (19 in doubles) on the ITF Women's Circuit. She has reached the doubles final of the WTA Tier IV tournament in Palermo three times. Her biggest ITF title came when she won the doubles of the $50k event in Marseille in 2000. She has also competed on the Grand Slam tournaments on numerous occasions, but was unable to make it past round two in doubles and qualifying in singles.

Canepa retired after losing in the doubles final of the event in Palermo on 22 July 2007. She had partnered compatriot Karin Knapp, losing the final to Mariya Koryttseva and Darya Kustova, in straight sets.

== WTA Tour finals ==
=== Doubles: 3 (runner-ups) ===
Legend
Grand Slam tournaments
Tier I
Tier II
Tier III, IV & V (0–3)

Finals by surface
Hard (0–0)
Grass (0–0)
Clay (0–3)
Carpet (0–0)

Result	No.	Date	Tournament	Surface	Partner	Opponents	Score
Loss	1.	Jul 1994	Palermo Ladies Open, Italy	Clay	(Italy) Giulia Casoni	(Romania) Ruxandra Dragomir (Italy) Laura Garrone	1–6, 0–6
Loss	2.	Jul 2006	Palermo Ladies Open, Italy	Clay	(Italy) Giulia Gabba	(Slovakia) Janette Husárová (Netherlands) Michaëlla Krajicek	0–6, 0–6
Loss	3.	Jul 2007	Palermo Ladies Open, Italy	Clay	(Italy) Karin Knapp	(Ukraine) Mariya Koryttseva (Belarus) Darya Kustova	4–6, 1–6

== ITF finals ==
$50,000 tournaments
$25,000 tournaments
$10,000 tournaments

=== Singles: 13 (5–8) ===
Result	No.	Date	Tournament	Surface	Opponent	Score
Win	1.	16 February 1997	ITF Mallorca, Spain	Clay	(Germany) Katrin Kilsch	6–2, 7–5
Win	2.	24 May 1998	ITF Modena, Italy	Clay	(Italy) Yasmin Angeli	4–6, 6–4, 6–2
Win	3.	22 June 1998	ITF Sezze, Italy	Clay	(Tunisia) Selima Sfar	7–5, 6–2
Loss	4.	26 July 1998	Lido di Camaiore, Italy	Clay	(Croatia) Marijana Kovačević	7–5, 4–6, 2–6
Loss	5.	19 September 1999	Reggio Calabria, Italy	Clay	(Ukraine) Tatiana Kovalchuk	3–6, 6–2, 2–6
Loss	6.	28 November 1999	Rio de Janeiro, Brazil	Clay	(Brazil) Miriam D'Agostini	6–3, 2–6, 3–6
Loss	7.	9 April 2000	Cagliari, Italy	Clay	(Spain) Laura Pena	2–6, 4–6
Win	8.	28 July 2003	Gardone Val Trompia, Italy	Clay	(Austria) Sandra Klemenschits	6–2, 6–3
Win	9.	28 March 2004	Rome, Italy	Clay	(Italy) Margot Torre	6–3, 6–1
Loss	10.	11 July 2004	Cuneo, Italy	Clay	(Italy) Flavia Pennetta	4–6, 1–6
Loss	11.	19 June 2005	Gorizia, Italy	Clay	(Croatia) Ivana Lisjak	2–6, 3–6
Loss	12.	26 June 2005	Fontanafredda, Italy	Clay	(Austria) Sybille Bammer	6–7^{(3)}, 2–6
Loss	13.	9 July 2006	Cuneo, Italy	Clay	(Kazakhstan) Galina Voskoboeva	1–6, 2–6

=== Doubles: 33 (19–14) ===
Result	No.	Date	Tournament	Surface	Partner	Opponents	Score
Win	1.	30 August 1993	ITF Massa, Italy	Clay	(Italy) Giulia Casoni	(Italy) Germana di Natale (Italy) Giulia Toschi	7–6, 6–1
Win	2.	24 April 1995	ITF Bari, Italy	Clay	(Italy) Giulia Casoni	(Federal Republic of Yugoslavia) Marina Gojković (Serbia) Dragana Zarić	6–0, 6–0
Loss	3.	12 June 1995	ITF Massa, Italy	Clay	(Italy) Giulia Casoni	(Switzerland) Emmanuelle Gagliardi (Italy) Marzia Grossi	6–3, 4–6, 5–7
Loss	4.	19 May 1996	Bordeaux, France	Clay	(Belarus) Olga Barabanschikova	(France) Karine Quentrec (France) Anne-Gaëlle Sidot	2–6, 3–6
Loss	5.	15 September 1996	Marseille, France	Clay	(Netherlands) Debby Haak	(Denmark) Sofie Albinus (Denmark) Karin Ptaszek	7–5, 5–7, 4–6
Loss	6.	3 February 1997	Mallorca, Spain	Clay	(Italy) Sara Ventura	(Italy) Cristina Salvi (Romania) Andreea Ehritt-Vanc	3–6, 6–3, 2–6
Win	7.	8 February 1998	Mallorca, Spain	Clay	(Italy) Katia Altilia	(Germany) Eva Belbl (Germany) Angelika Rösch	7–5, 7–6
Loss	8.	15 February 1998	Mallorca, Spain	Clay	(Spain) Conchita Martínez Granados	(Germany) Eva Belbl (Germany) Silke Frankl	3–6, 3–6
Win	9.	6 April 1998	Athens, Greece	Clay	(Italy) Tathiana Garbin	(Romania) Alice Pirsu (Romania) Andreea Ehritt-Vanc	5–7, 6–2, 6–4
Win	10.	24 May 1998	Modena, Italy	Clay	(Italy) Alessia Lombardi	(Croatia) Marijana Kovačević (Croatia) Kristina Pojatina	6–7^{(5)}, 6–3, 7–5
Loss	11.	31 May 1998	Warsaw, Poland	Clay	(Italy) Alessia Lombardi	(Czech Republic) Jana Ondrouchová (Czech Republic) Olga Vymetálková	6–7^{(4)}, 4–6
Win	12.	24 May 1998	Camucia, Italy	Clay	(Italy) Alessia Lombardi	(France) Berengere Karpenschif (Italy) Elena Pioppo	6–3, 6–2
Loss	13.	22 June 1998	Sezze, Italy	Clay	(Italy) Alessia Lombardi	(France) Vanina Casanova (Tunisia) Selima Sfar	3–6, 1–6
Win	14.	5 July 1998	Orbetello, Italy	Clay	(Italy) Tathiana Garbin	(Venezuela) Melissa Mazzotta (Colombia) Fabiola Zuluaga	6–2, 6–3
Loss	15.	18 October 1998	São Paulo, Brazil	Clay	(Italy) Antonella Serra Zanetti	(Netherlands) Seda Noorlander (Greece) Christína Papadáki	3–6, 7–6^{(4)}, 6–7^{(4)}
Loss	16.	23 November 1998	Lima, Peru	Clay	(Spain) Conchita Martínez Granados	(Slovenia) Katarina Srebotnik (Slovakia) Zuzana Váleková	7–6^{(4)}, 5–7, 4–6
Loss	17.	7 February 1999	Mallorca, Spain	Clay	(Argentina) María Fernanda Landa	(Spain) Rosa María Andrés Rodríguez (Spain) Lourdes Domínguez Lino	1–6, 1–6
Win	18.	24 May 1999	Budapest, Hungary	Clay	(Belarus) Tatiana Poutchek	(Spain) Eva Bes (Spain) Mariam Ramón Climent	6–3, 6–0
Loss	19.	19 September 1999	Reggio Calabria, Italy	Clay	(Italy) Tathiana Garbin	(Netherlands) Debby Haak (Netherlands) Andrea van den Hurk	1–6, 1–6
Loss	20.	14 November 1999	Monterrey, Mexico	Hard	(Argentina) Clarisa Fernández	(Paraguay) Rossana de los Ríos (Argentina) Mariana Díaz Oliva	6–4, 6–7^{(6)}, 3–6
Win	21.	21 November 1999	Campos, Brazil	Clay	(Argentina) Paula Racedo	(Argentina) Jorgelina Torti (Argentina) Melisa Arévalo	5–7, 6–4, 6–1
Win	22.	15 April 2000	Maglie, Italy	Clay	(Italy) Maria Paola Zavagli	(Bulgaria) Svetlana Krivencheva (Belarus) Tatiana Poutchek	6–1, 6–4
Win	23.	11 June 2000	Galatina, Italy	Clay	(Argentina) Mariana Díaz Oliva	(Brazil) Miriam D'Agostini (Brazil) Joana Cortez	6–4, 4–6, 6–4
Win	24.	18 June 2000	Marseille, France	Clay	(Argentina) Mariana Díaz Oliva	(Poland) Anna Bieleń-Żarska (Bulgaria) Svetlana Krivencheva	6–2, 6–3
Loss	25.	6 August 2000	Alghero, Italy	Clay	(Italy) Valentina Sassi	(Japan) Ayami Takase (Hong Kong) Tong Ka-po	6–3, 3–6, 1–6
Win	26.	1 September 2002	Spoleto, Italy	Clay	(Italy) Emily Stellato	(Austria) Stefanie Haidner (Italy) Silvia Disderi	6–2, 6–2
Win	27.	30 September 2002	Ciampino, Italy	Clay	(Italy) Emily Stellato	(Romania) Oana Elena Golimbioschi (Hungary) Eszter Molnár	6–1, 4–6, 6–2
Win	28.	29 March 2003	Parioli, Italy	Clay	(Italy) Emily Stellato	(Italy) Giulia Meruzzi (Italy) Silvia Disderi	6–3, 6–1
Loss	29.	25 August 2003	Rimini, Italy	Clay	(Italy) Emily Stellato	(Bosnia and Herzegovina) Mervana Jugić-Salkić (Croatia) Darija Jurak	6–7^{(3)}, 7–6^{(7)}, 5–7
Win	30.	8 March 2004	Rome, Italy	Clay	(Italy) Emily Stellato	(Austria) Daniela Klemenschits (Austria) Sandra Klemenschits	6–3, 2–6, 6–4
Win	31.	15 March 2004	Rome, Italy	Clay	(Italy) Emily Stellato	(Czech Republic) Zuzana Hejdová (Slovakia) Lenka Tvarošková	4–6, 6–1, 7–5
Win	32.	28 March 2004	Parioli, Italy	Clay	(Italy) Emily Stellato	(Italy) Giulia Meruzzi (Italy) Elisa Balsamo	7–6^{(0)}, 6–3
Win	33.	4 April 2005	Rome, Italy	Clay	(Italy) Emily Stellato	(Germany) Adriana Barna (Romania) Andreea Ehritt-Vanc	6–4, 6–0
