= Veronika Martinek =

German tennis player (born 1972)

- Country (sports): Germany
- Born: 3 April 1972 (age 54) Ústí nad Labem, Czechoslovakia
- Height: 1.60 m (5 ft 3 in)
- Turned pro: 1987
- Retired: 2001
- Prize money: US$410,132

Singles
- Career record: 164-177
- Career titles: 1 WTA, 1 ITF
- Highest ranking: No. 49 (25 March 1991)

Grand Slam singles results
- Australian Open: 2R (1991, 1993, 1995)
- French Open: 3R (1995)
- Wimbledon: 1R (1990-1996)
- US Open: 1R (1993-1995)

Doubles
- Career record: 50-76
- Career titles: 1 WTA, 3 ITF
- Highest ranking: No. 117 (12 September 1994)

Veronika Martinek (born 3 April 1972) is a former professional tennis player playing for Germany. On 25 March 1991, she reached a career high of No. 49 on the WTA rankings. Her career stretched from the end of the 1980s to 2001.

In 1995, she lost in the third round of Roland-Garros to Adriana Serra Zanetti, her best performance in Grand Slam tournaments.

== WTA Tour finals ==
=== Singles (1 titles, 1 runners-up) ===
Legend
Grand Slam (0)
WTA Championships (0)
Tier I (0)
Tier II (0)
Tier III (0)
Tier IV & V (0)

Result	W/L	Date	Tournament	Surface	Opponent	Score
Win	1–0	Nov 1990	São Paulo, Brazil	Clay	(United States) Donna Faber	6–2, 6–4
Loss	1–1	Dec 1991	São Paulo, Brazil	Clay	(Germany) Sabine Hack	3–6, 5–7

=== Doubles (1-0) ===
Result	W/L	Date	Tournament	Surface	Partner	Opponents	Score
Win	1–1	Oct 1993	Curitiba, Brazil	Clay	(Germany) Sabine Hack	(Brazil) Cláudia Chabalgoity (Brazil) Andrea Vieira	6–2, 7–6^{(7–4)}

== ITF finals ==
=== Singles (1–2) ===
Legend
$75,000 tournaments
$25,000 tournaments
$10,000 tournaments

Result	No.	Date	Tournament	Surface	Opponent	Score
Win	1.	3 July 1989	Cava de' Tirreni, Italy	Clay	(Netherlands) Hellas ter Riet	6–3, 6–4
Loss	2.	8 August 1994	Plovdiv, Bulgaria	Clay	(Germany) Petra Winzenhöller	4–6, 0–6
Loss	3.	13 June 1999	Doksy, Czech Republic	Clay	(Czech Republic) Milena Nekvapilová	1–6, 6–7

=== Doubles (3–0) ===
Result	No.	Date	Tournament	Surface	Partner	Opponents	Score
Win	1.	15 June 1987	Salerno, Italy	Clay	(Romania) Daniela Moise	(Australia) Kate McDonald (Czechoslovakia) Hana Adámková	7–6, 6–2
Win	2.	17 August 1987	Lisbon, Portugal	Clay	(Hungary) Réka Szikszay	(Italy) Stefania Dalla Valle (Austria) Bettina Diesner	7–6^{(4)}, 6–7^{(5)}, 7–6^{(5)}
Win	3.	7 September 1987	Madeira, Portugal	Clay	(West Germany) Martina Pawlik	(Australia) Jackie Masters (New Zealand) Michelle Parun	6–2, 6–4
