= Palermo Ladies Open =

WTA 125K series
- Founded: 1988
- Editions: 37
- Location: Palermo; Italy
- Venue: Country Time Club
- Category: WTA Tier V (1990–1992); WTA Tier IV (1993–2000); WTA Tier V (2001–2004); WTA Tier IV (2005–2008); WTA International (2009–2013), (2019–2020); WTA 250 (2021–2024), WTA 125 (2025-)
- Surface: Clay / outdoors
- Draw: 32M/16Q/14D
- Prize money: €100,000
- Website: palermoladiesopen.it

Current champions (2026)
- Singles: (United Kingdom) Francesca Jones
- Doubles: Anastasia Tikhonova (Slovenia) Tamara Zidanšek

The Palermo Ladies Open (Italian: Internazionali Femminili di Palermo), is a women's tennis tournament in Palermo, Italy that is played on outdoor clay courts at the Country Time Club. Since 2025, in its 36th edition, it became a WTA 125 event.

The first two editions were part of the Satellite Circuit, but since 1990 it has been part of the WTA Tour. In the past it has also been known as the "Palermo International" and the "Internazionali Femminili di Palermo." The tournament was categorized as either a WTA Tier IV or Tier V event from 1990 to 2008 and became an International Tournament in 2009. In 2014, the license for the event was sold to Kuala Lumpur's Malaysian Open for six years (contract for three years with an option for additional three). The tournament returned to Palermo in 2019 as a WTA International event, replacing Jiangxi International Women's Tennis Open which was moved to the autumn calendar as part of the China Open series.

== Past finals ==
=== Singles ===
Year	Champion	Runner-up	Score
↓ Tier V tournament ↓
1990	(Germany) Isabel Cueto	(Austria) Barbara Paulus	6–2, 6–3
1991	(France) Mary Pierce	(Italy) Sandra Cecchini	6–0, 6–3
1992	(France) Mary Pierce (2)	(Netherlands) Brenda Schultz	6–1, 6–7^{(3–7)}, 6–1
↓ Tier IV tournament ↓
1993	(Czech Republic) Radka Bobková	(France) Mary Pierce	6–3, 6–2
1994	(Romania) Irina Spîrlea	(Netherlands) Brenda Schultz	6–4, 1–6, 7–6^{(7–5)}
1995	(Romania) Irina Spîrlea (2)	(Germany) Sabine Hack	7–6^{(7–1)}, 6–2
1996	(Austria) Barbara Schett	(Germany) Sabine Hack	6–3, 6–3
1997	(France) Sandrine Testud	(Russia) Elena Makarova	7–5, 6–3
1998	(Switzerland) Patty Schnyder	(Austria) Barbara Schett	6–1, 5–7, 6–2
1999	(Russia) Anastasia Myskina	(Spain) Ángeles Montolio	3–6, 7–6^{(7–4)}, 6–2
2000	(Slovakia) Henrieta Nagyová	(Bulgaria) Pavlina Nola	6–3, 7–5
↓ Tier V tournament ↓
2001	(Spain) Anabel Medina Garrigues	(Spain) Cristina Torrens Valero	6–4, 6–4
2002	(Argentina) Mariana Díaz Oliva	(Russia) Vera Zvonareva	6–7^{(6–8)}, 6–1, 6–3
2003	(Russia) Dinara Safina	(Slovenia) Katarina Srebotnik	6–3, 6–4
2004	(Spain) Anabel Medina Garrigues (2)	(Italy) Flavia Pennetta	6–4, 6–4
↓ Tier IV tournament ↓
2005	(Spain) Anabel Medina Garrigues (3)	(Czech Republic) Klára Koukalová	6–4, 6–0
2006	(Spain) Anabel Medina Garrigues (4)	(Italy) Tathiana Garbin	6–4, 6–4
2007	(Hungary) Ágnes Szávay	(Germany) Martina Müller	6–0, 6–1
2008	(Italy) Sara Errani	(Ukraine) Mariya Koryttseva	6–2, 6–3
↓ International tournament ↓
2009	(Italy) Flavia Pennetta	(Italy) Sara Errani	6–1, 6–2
2010	(Estonia) Kaia Kanepi	(Italy) Flavia Pennetta	6–4, 6–3
2011	(Spain) Anabel Medina Garrigues (5)	(Slovenia) Polona Hercog	6–3, 6–2
2012	(Italy) Sara Errani (2)	(Czech Republic) Barbora Záhlavová-Strýcová	6–1, 6–3
2013	(Italy) Roberta Vinci	(Italy) Sara Errani	6–3, 3–6, 6–3
2014–18	Not held		
2019	(Switzerland) Jil Teichmann	(Netherlands) Kiki Bertens	7–6^{(7–3)}, 6–2
2020	(France) Fiona Ferro	(Estonia) Anett Kontaveit	6–2, 7–5
↓ WTA 250 tournament ↓
2021	(United States) Danielle Collins	(Romania) Elena-Gabriela Ruse	6–4, 6–2
2022	(Romania) Irina-Camelia Begu	(Italy) Lucia Bronzetti	6–2, 6–2
2023	(China) Zheng Qinwen	(Italy) Jasmine Paolini	6–4, 1–6, 6–1
2024	(China) Zheng Qinwen (2)	(Czech Republic) Karolína Muchová	6–4, 4–6, 6–2
↓ WTA 125 ↓
2025	(United Kingdom) Francesca Jones	(Netherlands) Anouk Koevermans	6–3, 6–2
2026	(United Kingdom) Francesca Jones (2)	(France) Fiona Ferro	6–0, 4–6, 7–6^{(8–6)}

=== Doubles ===
Year	Champion	Runner-up	Score
↓ Tier V tournament ↓
1990	(Italy) Laura Garrone (Austria) Karin Kschwendt	(Argentina) Florencia Labat (Italy) Barbara Romanò	6–2, 6–4
1991	(France) Mary Pierce (Czechoslovakia) Petra Langrová	(Italy) Laura Garrone (Argentina) Mercedes Paz	6–3, 6–7(5), 6–3
1992	(United States) Halle Cioffi (Argentina) María José Gaidano	(Czechoslovakia) Petra Langrová (Spain) Ana Segura	6–3, 4–6, 6–3
↓ Tier IV tournament ↓
1993	(Austria) Karin Kschwendt (Ukraine) Natalia Medvedeva	(Italy) Silvia Farina Elia (Netherlands) Brenda Schultz	6–4, 7–6
1994	(Romania) Ruxandra Dragomir (Italy) Laura Garrone (2)	(Italy) Alice Canepa (Italy) Giulia Casoni	6–1, 6–0
1995	(Czech Republic) Radka Bobková (Czech Republic) Petra Langrová (2)	(Austria) Petra Schwarz (Slovakia) Katarína Studeníková	6–4, 6–1
1996	(Slovakia) Janette Husárová (Austria) Barbara Schett	(Argentina) Florencia Labat (Germany) Barbara Rittner	7–6, 6–1
1997	(Italy) Silvia Farina Elia (Austria) Barbara Schett (2)	(Argentina) Florencia Labat (Argentina) Mercedes Paz	2–6, 6–1, 6–4
1998	(Bulgaria) Pavlina Nola (Germany) Elena Wagner	(Switzerland) Patty Schnyder (Austria) Barbara Schett	6–4, 6–2
1999	(Slovenia) Tina Križan (Slovenia) Katarina Srebotnik	(Sweden) Åsa Carlsson (Canada) Sonya Jeyaseelan	4–6, 6–3, 6–0
2000	(Italy) Silvia Farina Elia (2) (Italy) Rita Grande	(Romania) Ruxandra Dragomir (Spain) Virginia Ruano Pascual	6–4, 0–6, 7–6
↓ Tier V tournament ↓
2001	(Italy) Tathiana Garbin (Slovakia) Janette Husárová (2)	(Spain) María José Martínez Sánchez (Spain) Anabel Medina Garrigues	4–6, 6–2, 6–4
2002	(Russia) Evgenia Kulikovskaya (Russia) Ekaterina Sysoeva	(Bulgaria) Lubomira Bacheva (Germany) Angelika Rösch	6–4, 6–3
2003	(Italy) Adriana Serra Zanetti (Italy) Emily Stellato	(Spain) María José Martínez Sánchez (Spain) Arantxa Parra Santonja	6–4, 6–2
2004	(Spain) Anabel Medina Garrigues (Spain) Arantxa Sánchez-Vicario	(Slovakia) Ľubomíra Kurhajcová (Slovakia) Henrieta Nagyová	6–3, 7–6(4)
↓ Tier IV tournament ↓
2005	(Italy) Giulia Casoni (Ukraine) Mariya Koryttseva	(Poland) Klaudia Jans (Poland) Alicja Rosolska	4–6, 6–3, 7–5
2006	(Slovakia) Janette Husárová (3) (Netherlands) Michaëlla Krajicek	(Italy) Alice Canepa (Italy) Giulia Gabba	6–0, 6–0
2007	(Ukraine) Mariya Koryttseva (Belarus) Darya Kustova	(Italy) Alice Canepa (Italy) Karin Knapp	6–4, 6–1
2008	(Italy) Sara Errani (Spain) Nuria Llagostera Vives	(Russia) Alla Kudryavtseva (Russia) Anastasia Pavlyuchenkova	2–6, 7–6(1), 10–4
↓ International tournament ↓
2009	(Spain) Nuria Llagostera Vives (2) (Spain) María José Martínez Sánchez	(Ukraine) Mariya Koryttseva (Belarus) Darya Kustova	6–1, 6–2
2010	(Italy) Alberta Brianti (Italy) Sara Errani (2)	(United States) Jill Craybas (Germany) Julia Görges	6–4, 6–1
2011	(Italy) Sara Errani (3) (Italy) Roberta Vinci	(Czech Republic) Andrea Hlaváčková (Czech Republic) Klára Zakopalová	7–5, 6–1
2012	(Czech Republic) Renata Voráčová (Czech Republic) Barbora Záhlavová-Strýcová	(Croatia) Darija Jurak (Hungary) Katalin Marosi	7–6^{(7–5)}, 6–4
2013	(France) Kristina Mladenovic (Poland) Katarzyna Piter	(Czech Republic) Karolína Plíšková (Czech Republic) Kristýna Plíšková	6–1, 5–7, [10–8]
2014–18	Not held		
2019	(Sweden) Cornelia Lister (Czech Republic) Renata Voráčová	(Georgia (country)) Ekaterine Gorgodze (Netherlands) Arantxa Rus	7–6^{(7–2)}, 6–2
2020	(Netherlands) Arantxa Rus (Slovenia) Tamara Zidanšek	(Italy) Elisabetta Cocciaretto (Italy) Martina Trevisan	7–5, 7–5
↓ WTA 250 tournament ↓
2021	(New Zealand) Erin Routliffe (Belgium) Kimberley Zimmermann	(Russia) Natela Dzalamidze (Russia) Kamilla Rakhimova	7–6^{(7–5)}, 4–6, [10–4]
2022	(Hungary) Anna Bondár (Belgium) Kimberley Zimmermann (2)	Amina Anshba (Hungary) Panna Udvardy	6–3, 6–2
2023	Yana Sizikova (Belgium) Kimberley Zimmermann (3)	(Italy) Angelica Moratelli (Italy) Camilla Rosatello	6–2, 6–4
2024	Alexandra Panova; Yana Sizikova (2)	(Spain) Yvonne Cavallé Reimers (Italy) Aurora Zantedeschi	4–6, 6–3, [10–5]
↓ WTA 125 ↓
2025	(France) Estelle Cascino (China) Feng Shuo	(Japan) Momoko Kobori (Japan) Ayano Shimizu	6–2, 6–7^{(2–7)}, [10–7]
2026	Anastasia Tikhonova (Slovenia) Tamara Zidanšek (2)	(United States) Rasheeda McAdoo (Hungary) Adrienn Nagy	6–4, 6–4

== See also ==
- Campionati Internazionali di Sicilia – men's tournament (1935–2006)
- List of tennis tournaments
