= Nathalie Baudone =

Italian tennis player

- Full name: Nathalie Baudone-Furlan
- Country (sports): Italy
- Born: 12 July 1972 (age 52); Rocourt, Belgium
- Prize money: $311,013

Singles
- Highest ranking: No. 71 (5 July 1993)

Grand Slam singles results
- Australian Open: 2R (1993)
- French Open: 3R (1993, 1995)
- Wimbledon: 2R (1996)
- US Open: 3R (1995)

Doubles
- Highest ranking: No. 124 (27 April 1992)

Grand Slam doubles results
- Australian Open: 1R (1993)
Medal record
Mediterranean Games
Gold medal – first place	1991 Athens	Women's Doubles
Bronze medal – third place	1991 Athens	Women's Singles

Nathalie Baudone-Furlan (born 12 July 1972) is a former professional tennis player from Italy.

== Biography ==
Baudone was born in Belgium but represented Italy during her career. As a junior she reached the girls' doubles semi-finals at the 1990 US Open, with Silvia Farina Elia. She won two medals at the 1991 Mediterranean Games in Athens, a gold partnering Katia Piccolini in the doubles and a bronze in the singles event.

=== Professional tennis ===
Baudone's first WTA Tour quarter-final came in 1992, at the Internazionali Femminili di Palermo tournament in her home country. In 1993 she reached her highest ranking of 71 in the world, soon after reaching the third round of the French Open. At the 1993 US Open she lost a close match to 13th seed Mary Pierce in the first round, which was decided by a final set tie-break. She also was a quarter-finalist at Linz that year. At the 1994 Canadian Open she won three matches to make her third WTA Tour quarter-final. Her run in the tournament, which was a Tier I event, included wins over seeded players Nathalie Tauziat and Lori McNeil. She made the third round of both the French Open and US Open in 1995. Notably her performance at the French Open included becoming the first player to beat Amélie Mauresmo in a Grand Slam match and ended at the hands of eventual champion Steffi Graf. In 1996 she appeared in three Fed Cup ties for Italy, against Sweden, Norway and Belarus.

=== Personal life ===
Baudone has been married to former Italian tennis player Renzo Furlan since 1996.

== ITF finals ==
=== Singles (2–0) ===
$100,000 tournaments
$75,000 tournaments
$50,000 tournaments
$25,000 tournaments
$10,000 tournaments

Result	No.	Date	Tournament	Surface	Opponent	Score
Win	1.	29 October 1990	Putignano, Italy	Clay	(Italy) Silvia Farina Elia	6–2, 6–4
Win	2.	12 August 1991	Pisticci, Italy	Hard	(Poland) Katarzyna Nowak	6–0, 6–1

=== Doubles (3-1) ===
Result	No	Date	Tournament	Surface	Partner	Opponents	Score
Loss	1.	29 May 1989	Florence, Italy	Clay	(Italy) Caterina Nozzoli	(South Africa) Michelle Anderson (Finland) Nanne Dahlman	3–6, 3–6
Win	2.	29 October 1990	Putignano, Italy	Clay	(Italy) Silvia Farina Elia	(Socialist Federal Republic of Yugoslavia) Darija Dešković (Socialist Federal Republic of Yugoslavia) Karin Lušnic	6–1, 6–1
Win	3.	3 June 1991	Milan, Italy	Clay	(Italy) Francesca Romano	(Spain) Rosa Bielsa (Spain) Janet Souto	6–4, 7–5
Win	4.	1 June 1992	Brindisi, Italy	Clay	(Italy) Cristina Salvi	(Czechoslovakia) Ivana Jankovská (Czechoslovakia) Eva Melicharová	4–6, 6–3, 6–2
