= WTA Tier IV tournaments =

Tennis tournament category

The WTA Tier IV tournaments were Women's Tennis Association fourth-level tournaments held from 1990 until the end of the 2008 season. The line-up of events varied over the years, with tournaments being promoted, demoted or cancelled. Some of the tournaments became Tier V events between 1990 and 1992, and later from 2001 to 2005, before being integrated back into Tier IV.

From 2009 WTA Tour, WTA changed the tournament categories, so that most of the Tier III and Tier IV tournaments from 2008 were in one category, WTA International tournaments.

== Tournaments ==
| Tournament | Also known as | City(s) | Country | Court surface | Tier IV in | Years |
|---|---|---|---|---|---|---|
| Puerto Rico Open | Honda Classic | San Juan (1991–1993); Dorado (1990) | Puerto Rico, US | Hard | 1990–1993 | 4 |
| Kansas | Avon Championships of Kansas | Wichita, KS | United States | Hard | 1990 | 1 |
| Albuquerque | Virginia Slims of Albuquerque | Albuquerque, NM | United States | Hard | 1990–1991 | 2 |
| Nashville | Virginia Slims of Nashville | Nashville, TN | United States | Hard | 1990–1991 | 2 |
| Spanish Open | International Championships of Spain | Barcelona | Spain | Clay | 1990 | 1 |
| Birmingham Classic | Aegon Classic | Birmingham | United Kingdom | Grass | 1990–1992 | 3 |
| Brisbane International | Danone Hardcourt Championships | Brisbane | Australia | Hard | 1990–1992 | 3 |
| Swiss Open | European Open | Geneva (1990–1991); Lucerne (1992) | Switzerland | Clay | 1990–1992 | 3 |
| Indianapolis | Virginia Slims of Indianapolis | Indianapolis | United States | Hard | 1990–1992 | 3 |
| Memphis | Virginia Slims of Oklahoma | Memphis, TN | United States | Hard | 1990–1992 | 3 |
| Paris | Clarins Open | Paris | France | Clay | 1990–1992 | 3 |
| Strasbourg | Internationaux de Strasbourg | Strasbourg | France | Clay | 1990–1992 | 3 |
| Tokyo | Suntory Japan Open | Tokyo | Japan | Hard | 1990–1992 | 3 |
| Bayonne | Whirlpool Open | Bayonne | France | Carpet (i) | 1991–1992 | 2 |
| Kuala Lumpur | Malaysian Women's Open | Kuala Lumpur | Malaysia | Hard (i) | 1992–1993 | 2 |
| Taipei | P&G Taiwan Women's Open | Taipei | Taiwan | Hard | 1992–1994 | 3 |
