= Karin Kschwendt =

Austrian tennis player

- Country (sports): Luxembourg (–Nov 1991); Germany (Dec 1991–Sep 1996); Austria (Oct 1996–)
- Residence: Vienna, Austria
- Born: 14 September 1968 (age 57) Sorengo, Switzerland
- Height: 1.75 m (5 ft 9 in)
- Turned pro: 1986
- Retired: 2000
- Plays: Right-handed (two-handed backhand)
- Prize money: $674,599

Singles
- Career record: 244–221
- Career titles: 0 WTA, 2 ITF
- Highest ranking: No. 37 (12 August 1996)

Grand Slam singles results
- Australian Open: 3R (1991, 1996)
- French Open: 3R (1994)
- Wimbledon: 3R (1990)
- US Open: 2R (1990, 1995, 1996)

Doubles
- Career record: 158–181
- Career titles: 6 WTA, 3 ITF
- Highest ranking: No. 45 (19 February 1996)

Karin Kschwendt (born 14 September 1968) is a former professional tennis player who represented Luxembourg, Germany and Austria at various points in her career. She reached her career-high ranking of world No. 37 on 12 August 1996. In doubles, she went as high as No. 45 in February 1996.

Kschwendt was born in Switzerland to Austrian parents Heinz and Edith, but grew up in Luxembourg, where she lived for 23 years.

== Tennis career ==
Kschwendt made her professional debut in 1986, when she played for Luxembourg during a Fed Cup tie. She continued to represent Luxembourg in the early part of her career, and in 1990 became the first female player from that country to reach the third round of a Grand Slam tournament, a feat that she achieved at Wimbledon, before she lost to Martina Navratilova.

In 1991, she reached the third round of the Australian Open, a result that broke her into the top 100, and finished the year at No. 88, but soon left in early 1992 after a lengthy break with injury. She came back stronger and managed to finish 1992 as the No. 78 in the world.

Kschwendt began to achieve solid results in 1993; now playing for Germany, she reached the semifinals of Auckland, the quarterfinals of Paris, and made her first and only WTA Tour final at an event in Belgium (she lost to Radka Bobková). The following year, she reached the third round of a major once more, this time at the French Open, but fell to Iva Majoli.

1996 saw Kschwendt put together her best season, reaching the third round of the Australian Open and achieving consistent results in WTA Tour events. She finished that year at No. 47, but went as high as No. 37 in August.

In 1997, she played her only match for the Austria Fed Cup team, losing her doubles match against Croatia.

Her last few years were mostly spent playing on the ITF Women's Circuit and qualifying rounds of WTA events. In 2000, she played her last match on the professional tour.

== WTA career finals ==
Tournament (W–R)	Singles	Doubles
Grand Slam tournaments	0–0	0–0
Tier I	0–0	0–0
Tier II	0–0	0–0
Tier III	0–0	1–0
Tier IV	0–1	4–1

Surface (W–R)	Singles	Doubles
Hard	0–0	2–1
Clay	0–1	4–1
Grass	0–0	0–0
Carpet	0–0	0–0

=== Singles: 1 (runner-up) ===
Result	W–L	Date	Tournament	Surface	Opponent	Score
Loss	0–1	May 1993	Belgian Open	Clay	(Czechoslovakia) Radka Bobková	3–6, 6–4, 2–6

=== Doubles: 8 (6 titles, 2 runner-ups) ===
Result	W–L	Date	Tournament	Surface	Partner	Opponents	Score
Win	1–0	Jul 1990	Palermo Open, Italy	Clay	(Italy) Laura Garrone	(Argentina) Florencia Labat (Italy) Barbara Romanò	6–2, 6–4
Win	2–0	Sep 1990	Athens Trophy, Greece	Clay	(Italy) Laura Garrone	(Czechoslovakia) Leona Lásková (Czechoslovakia) Jana Pospíšilová	6–0, 1–6, 7–6^{(8–6)}
Win	3–0	Jul 1992	Prague Open, Czech Republic	Clay	(Germany) Petra Schwarz	(Czech Republic) Eva Švíglerová (France) Noëlle van Lottum	6–4, 2–6, 7–5
Win	4–0	Jul 1993	Palermo Open, Italy	Clay	(Ukraine) Natalia Medvedeva	(Italy) Silvia Farina (Netherlands) Brenda Schultz	6–4, 7–6^{(7–4)}
Win	5–0	Sep 1993	Hong Kong Open, China	Hard	(Australia) Rachel McQuillan	(United States) Debbie Graham (United States) Marianne Werdel	1–6, 7–6, 6–2
Win	6–0	Feb 1995	Puerto Rico Open	Hard	(Canada) Rene Simpson	(Italy) Laura Golarsa (United States) Linda Harvey-Wild	6–2, 0–6, 6–4
Loss	6–1	Apr 1998	Makarska International, Croatia	Clay	(Russia) Evgenia Kulikovskaya	(Slovenia) Tina Križan (Slovenia) Katarina Srebotnik	6–7^{(3–7)}, 1–6
Loss	6–2	Jul 1998	Warsaw Open, Poland	Hard	(South Africa) Liezel Horn	(Slovakia) Karina Habšudová (Ukraine) Olga Lugina	6–7^{(2–7)}, 5–7

== ITF finals ==
$100,000 tournaments
$75,000 tournaments
$50,000 tournaments
$25,000 tournaments
$10,000 tournaments

=== Singles: 5 (2–3) ===
Result	No.	Date	Tournament	Surface	Opponent	Score
Loss	1.	28 September 1987	Bol, Yugoslavia	Clay	(Czechoslovakia) Jana Pospíšilová	3–6, 3–6
Loss	2.	12 October 1987	Mali Lošinj, Yugoslavia	Clay	(Czechoslovakia) Jana Pospíšilová	4–6, 4–6
Win	3.	8 August 1988	Palermo, Italy	Clay	(Italy) Marzia Grossi	4–6, 6–0, 6–1
Loss	4.	26 February 1990	Wels, Austria	Clay	(Austria) Marion Maruska	6–3, 1–6, 4–6
Win	5.	6 July 1992	Erlangen, Germany	Clay	(Hungary) Anna Földényi	6–4, 6–2

=== Doubles: 7 (3–4) ===
Result	No.	Date	Tournament	Surface	Partner	Opponents	Score
Win	1.	4 October 1987	Rabac, Yugoslavia	Clay	(Netherlands) Amy van Buuren	(Netherlands) Marielle Rooimans (Netherlands) Nicolette Rooimans	6–3, 6–4
Win	2.	26 March 1990	Madrid, Spain	Clay	(Uruguay) Patricia Miller	(Soviet Union) Natalia Biletskaya (Soviet Union) Svetlana Komleva	4–6, 7–5, 6–3
Loss	3.	5 February 1996	Würzburg, Germany	Carpet (i)	(Czech Republic) Eva Martincová	(Netherlands) Stephanie Gomperts (Netherlands) Stephanie Rottier	2–6, 3–6
Win	4.	15 September 1997	Sofia, Bulgaria	Clay	(Germany) Sandra Klösel	(Federal Republic of Yugoslavia) Sandra Načuk (Federal Republic of Yugoslavia) Dragana Zarić	6–4, 6–4
Loss	5.	2 August 1998	Salt Lake City, United States	Hard	(South Africa) Liezel Horn	(South Africa) Mariaan de Swardt (United Kingdom) Samantha Smith	2–6, 2–6
Loss	6.	21 September 1998	Bucharest, Romania	Clay	(Czech Republic) Lenka Cenková	(Spain) Eva Bes (Spain) Rosa María Andrés Rodríguez	6–4, 6–7^{(6)}, 0–6
Loss	7.	5 December 1998	New Delhi, India	Hard	(Slovenia) Tina Križan	(Czech Republic) Lenka Cenková (Netherlands) Amanda Hopmans	w/o
