= Elena Savoldi =

Italian tennis player

- Full name: Elena Savoldi
- Country (sports): Italy
- Born: 11 November 1972 (age 53)
- Prize money: $93,224

Singles
- Highest ranking: No. 134 (1 August 1994)

Doubles
- Highest ranking: No. 129 (15 August 1994)

Grand Slam doubles results
- US Open: 1R (1994)
Medal record
Mediterranean Games
Silver medal – second place	1987 Latakia	Women's Doubles

Elena Savoldi (born 11 November 1972) is a former professional tennis player from Italy.

== Biography ==
Savoldi, who comes from Brescia, began her career on the ITF circuit in 1990.

At the 1991 Mediterranean Games in Athens she won a silver medal in the women's doubles event, partnering Francesca Romano.

She reached a career high singles ranking of 134 on the professional tour, with her best WTA Tour performances including a third round appearance at the 1993 Italian Open and a win over Miriam Oremans to make the round of 16 at Taranto in 1994. On the ITF circuit she won six singles titles.

It was as a doubles player that she made her only grand slam main draw appearance, at the 1994 US Open with partner Susanna Attili.

== ITF finals ==
$75,000 tournaments
$25,000 tournaments
$10,000 tournaments

=== Singles (6-1) ===
Result	No.	Date	Tournament	Surface	Opponent	Score
Win	1.	12 January 1992	Woodlands, United States	Hard	(Croatia) Iva Majoli	6–4, 6–4
Win	2.	8 March 1992	Granada, Spain	Hard	(Germany) Antonela Voina	7–5, 7–6
Win	3.	11 January 1993	Bergen, Norway	Carpet	(Moldova) Svetlana Komleva	6–2, 6–3
Win	4.	18 January 1993	Helsinki, Finland	Carpet	(Sweden) Maria Ekstrand	6–2, 6–0
Win	5.	22 February 1993	Valencia, Spain	Hard	(Italy) Federica Bonsignori	6–4, 6–1
Win	6.	8 August 1993	Winnipeg, Canada	Hard	(United States) Luanne Spadea	6–2, 6–4
Loss	1.	28 January 1998	Mission, United States	Hard	(United States) Karin Miller	3–6, 5–7

=== Doubles (4–4) ===
Result	No.	Date	Tournament	Surface	Partner	Opponents	Score
Loss	1.	30 July 1990	Catania, Italy	Clay	(Italy) Cristina Salvi	(Italy) Antonella Canapi (Italy) Claudia Piccini	3–6, 3–6
Win	1.	28 September 1991	Biella, Italy	Clay	(Italy) Claudia Piccini	(Argentina) María José Gaidano (Paraguay) Sandra Ugarriza	6–1, 6–4
Win	2.	18 January 1993	Helsinki, Finland	Carpet	(Italy) Susanna Attili	(Sweden) Maria Ekstrand (Belgium) Vanessa Matthys	5–7, 6–3, 6–3
Loss	2.	10 May 1993	Putignano, Italy	Hard	(Italy) Susanna Attili	(Czech Republic) Eva Melicharová (Czech Republic) Ivana Jankovská	3–6, 7–6^{(6)}, 4–6
Loss	3.	6 September 1993	Spoleto, Italy	Clay	(Italy) Susanna Attili	(Ukraine) Olga Lugina (Paraguay) Larissa Schaerer	5–7, 6–7^{(5)}
Loss	4.	27 March 1994	Brest, France	Hard	(Italy) Susanna Attili	(Denmark) Karin Ptaszek (Belgium) Els Callens	4–6, 1–6
Win	3.	4 September 1995	Spoleto, Italy	Clay	(Italy) Cristina Salvi	(Republic of Ireland) Karen Nugent (Australia) Angie Woolcock	1–6, 7–6, 6–2
Win	4.	30 June 1997	Sezze, Italy	Clay	(Italy) Laura Garrone	(Russia) Anna Linkova (Romania) Andreea Vanc	6–3, 6–0
