= Silke Meier =

German tennis player

- Country (sports): Germany
- Born: 13 July 1968 (age 57) Wiesbaden, West Germany
- Turned pro: 1985
- Retired: 2000
- Prize money: US$ 522,976

Singles
- Career record: 190–214
- Career titles: 0 WTA, 3 ITF
- Highest ranking: No. 40 (26 October 1987)

Grand Slam singles results
- Australian Open: 2R (1990, 1993, 1995, 1996)
- French Open: 2R (1986, 1988, 1989, 1992, 1994, 1995)
- Wimbledon: 2R (1987, 1988)
- US Open: 3R (1990)

Doubles
- Career record: 94–133
- Career titles: 1 WTA, 4 ITF
- Highest ranking: No. 85 (9 December 1996)

Grand Slam doubles results
- Australian Open: 2R (1989)
- French Open: 2R (1987, 1996)
- Wimbledon: 1R (1987, 1996, 1997)
- US Open: 1R (1987, 1990)

Mixed doubles
- Career record: 1–1

Grand Slam mixed doubles results
- French Open: 2R (1987)

Silke Meier (born 13 July 1968) is a former professional tennis player from Germany who played on the WTA tour from 1985 to 1999. She reached the third round of the US Open in 1990 and, over her career, recorded victories against Jana Novotná, Helena Suková and Manuela Maleeva.

== WTA Tour finals ==
=== Singles 1 ===
Legend
WTA Championships	0
Tier I	0
Tier II	0
Tier III	0
Tier IV & V	0

Result	W/L	Date	Tournament	Surface	Opponent	Score
Loss	0–1	Apr 1995	Zagreb, Croatia	Clay	(Belgium) Sabine Appelmans	4–6, 3–6

=== Doubles 4 (1–3) ===
Legend
WTA Championships	0
Tier I	0
Tier II	0
Tier III	0
Tier IV & V	1

Titles by surface
Hard	0
Clay	0
Grass	0
Carpet	1

Result	W/L	Date	Tournament	Surface	Partner	Opponents	Score
Loss	0–1	Sep 1986	Athens, Greece	Clay	(West Germany) Wiltrud Probst	(West Germany) Isabel Cueto (Spain) Arantxa Sánchez Vicario	6–4, 2–6, 4–6
Loss	0–2	Aug 1989	Sofia, Bulgaria	Clay	(Bulgaria) Elena Pampoulova	(Italy) Laura Garrone (Italy) Laura Golarsa	4–6, 5–7
Loss	0–3	Sep 1989	Athens, Greece	Clay	(Bulgaria) Elena Pampoulova	(Italy) Sandra Cecchini (Argentina) Patricia Tarabini	6–4, 4–6, 2–6
Win	1–3	Feb 1991	Oslo, Norway	Carpet (i)	(West Germany) Claudia Kohde-Kilsch	(Belgium) Sabine Appelmans (Italy) Raffaella Reggi	3–6, 6–2, 6–4

== ITF finals ==
=== Singles (3–0) ===
Legend
$75,000 tournaments
$25,000 tournaments
$10,000 tournaments

Outcome	No.	Date	Tournament	Surface	Opponent	Score
Winner	1.	5 August 1985	Rheda, West Germany	Clay	(West Germany) Sabine Hack	7–5, 6–4
Winner	2.	20 November 1994	Bad Gögging, Germany	Carpet (i)	(Serbia and Montenegro) Tatjana Ječmenica	4–6, 6–4, 6–3
Winner	3.	27 July 1997	Rostock, Germany	Clay	(Germany) Syna Schreiber	6–3, 7–5

=== Doubles (4–7) ===
Outcome	No.	Date	Tournament	Surface	Partner	Opponents	Score
Winner	1.	5 August 1985	Rheda, West Germany	Clay	(West Germany) Claudia Porwik	(United Kingdom) Belinda Borneo (United Kingdom) Lorrayne Gracie	4–6, 7–6, 6–1
Runner-up	2.	3 March 1986	Stockholm, Sweden	Clay	(West Germany) Claudia Porwik	(Czechoslovakia) Hana Fukárková (Czechoslovakia) Jana Novotná	4–6, 6–4, 3–6
Runner-up	3.	17 October 1994	Flensburg, Germany	Carpet	(Germany) Kirstin Freye	(Czech Republic) Kateřina Šišková (Czech Republic) Jana Pospíšilová	2–6, 6–4, 2–6
Winner	4.	11 February 1996	Murcia, Spain	Clay	(Austria) Petra Schwarz	(Netherlands) Kim de Weille (France) Noëlle van Lottum	6–3, 6–3
Runner-up	5.	11 August 1996	Sopot, Poland	Clay	(Germany) Kirstin Freye	(Czech Republic) Lenka Němečková (Czech Republic) Helena Vildová	0–6, 0–6
Runner-up	6.	17 November 1996	Bad Gögging, Germany	Carpet (i)	(Germany) Kirstin Freye	(India) Nirupama Sanjeev (Austria) Barbara Schwartz	4–6, 1–6
Runner-up	7.	17 March 1997	Reims, France	Clay (i)	(Austria) Petra Schwarz	(Bulgaria) Svetlana Krivencheva (Ukraine) Elena Tatarkova	2–6, 2–6
Winner	8.	25 August 1997	Orbatello, Italy	Clay	(Czech Republic) Kateřina Šišková	(Netherlands) Kim de Weille (Netherlands) Henriëtte van Aalderen	6–3, 2–6, 6–2
Runner-up	9.	26 April 1998	Espinho, Portugal	Carpet (i)	(Germany) Kirstin Freye	(Netherlands) Kim de Weille (France) Noëlle van Lottum	6–4, 3–6, 5–7
Runner-up	10.	6 July 1998	Puchheim, Germany	Clay	(Germany) Jasmin Wöhr	(Hungary) Virág Csurgó (Hungary) Nóra Köves	6–4, 0–6, 3–6
Winner	11.	31 August 1998	Hechingen, Germany	Clay	(Germany) Jasmin Wöhr	(Czech Republic) Linda Faltynková (Czech Republic) Blanka Kumbárová	6–2, 6–2
