= Petra Schwarz =

Austrian tennis player

- Country (sports): Austria
- Born: 24 May 1972 (age 54) Vienna, Austria
- Height: 1.74 m (5 ft 8 1/2 in)
- Turned pro: 1987
- Retired: 1997
- Plays: Right-handed
- Prize money: US$397,476

Singles
- Career record: 162–141
- Career titles: 0 WTA, 4 ITF
- Highest ranking: No. 52 (9 January 1995)

Grand Slam singles results
- Australian Open: 2R (1992)
- French Open: QF (1994)
- Wimbledon: 1R (1994 1995)
- US Open: 2R (1991)

Other tournaments
- Olympic Games: 1R (1992)

Doubles
- Career record: 75–112
- Career titles: 1 WTA, 2 ITF
- Highest ranking: No. 60 (10 May 1993)

Grand Slam doubles results
- Australian Open: 2R (1996)
- French Open: 1R (1993, 1994, 1995, 1996)
- Wimbledon: 1R (1994, 1995)
- US Open: 2R (1994, 1995)

Other doubles tournaments
- Olympic Games: 2R (1992)

Petra Schwarz (née Ritter; born 24 May 1972) is a former female professional tennis player from Austria, active from 1987 to 1997.

She reached the quarterfinals of the French Open in 1994, beating Lisa Raymond, Nathalie Tauziat, Miriam Oremans and Ruxandra Dragomir, before losing to Mary Pierce. It was the only time she passed the second round of a Grand Slam event.

Schwarz reached one WTA Tour final at the Ilva Trophy event in Italy. She also reached three doubles finals, winning one of them (Prague, partnering Karin Kschwendt). Her career high ranking was world No. 52 in singles and No. 60 in doubles.

== WTA career finals ==
=== Singles: 1 (0–1) ===
Legend: Before 2009	Legend: Starting in 2009
Grand Slam tournaments (0)
WTA Championships (0)
Tier I (0)	Premier Mandatory (0)
Tier II (0)	Premier 5 (0)
Tier III (0-0)	Premier (0)
Tier IV & V (0-1)	International (0)

Result	W-L	Date	Tournament	Surface	Opponent	Score
Loss	0–1	Apr 1991	Taranto, Italy	Clay	(Switzerland) Emanuela Zardo	5–7, 2–6

=== Doubles (1 titles, 2 runner-ups) ===
Result	W-L	Date	Tournament	Surface	Partner	Opponents	Score
Win	1–0	Jul 1992	Prague, Czech Republic	Clay	(Germany) Karin Kschwendt	(Czechoslovakia) Eva Švíglerová (France) Noëlle van Lottum	6–4, 2–6, 7–5
Loss	1–1	Feb 1995	Linz, Austria	Carpet (i)	(Croatia) Iva Majoli	(United States) Meredith McGrath (France) Nathalie Tauziat	1–6, 2–6
Loss	1–2	Jul 1995	Palermo, Italy	Clay	(Slovakia) Katarína Studeníková	(Czech Republic) Radka Bobková (Czech Republic) Petra Langrová	4–6, 1–6

== ITF finals ==
=== Singles (4-3) ===
$75,000 tournaments
$50,000 tournaments
$25,000 tournaments
$10,000 tournaments

Result	No.	Date	Tournament	Surface	Opponent	Score
Win	1.	31 May 1987	Bad Gastein, Austria	Hard (i)	(Netherlands) Hester Witvoet	2–6, 7–6, 6–1
Loss	1.	17 August 1987	Lisbon, Portugal	Clay	(Italy) Laura Lapi	4–6, 6–4, 5–7
Win	2.	10 April 1988	Bari, Italy	Clay	(Belgium) Sabine Appelmans	6–3, 6–4
Win	3.	7 August 1988	Wels, Austria	Hard (i)	(Austria) Karin Oberleitner	2–6, 6–0, 6–2
Win	4.	18 April 1993	Wels, Austria	Hard (i)	(Slovakia) Zuzana Nemšáková	6–2, 1–6, 6–4
Loss	2.	25 April 1994	Neudörfl, Austria	Clay	(Czechoslovakia) Zdeňka Málková	1–6, 2–6
Loss	3.	28 October 1996	Lakeland, United States	Hard	(United States) Meilen Tu	7–5, 0–6, 0–6

=== Doubles (2–2) ===
Result	No.	Date	Tournament	Surface	Partner	Opponents	Score
Loss	1.	16 November 1987	Wels, Austria	Hard (i)	(Austria) Barbara Paulus	(Austria) Petra Hentschl (West Germany) Eva-Maria Schürhoff	4–6, 4–6
Win	2.	24 October 1988	Linz, Austria	Hard (i)	(Austria) Marion Maruska	(Switzerland) Cristina Casini (Poland) Katarzyna Nowak	6–3, 6–4
Win	3.	11 February 1996	Murcia, Spain	Clay	(Germany) Silke Meier	(Netherlands) Kim de Weille (France) Noëlle van Lottum	6–3, 6–3
Loss	4.	17 March 1997	Reims, France	Clay (i)	(Germany) Silke Meier	(Bulgaria) Svetlana Krivencheva (Ukraine) Elena Tatarkova	2–6, 2–6
