= Laura Garrone =

Italian tennis player

- Country (sports): Italy
- Born: 15 November 1967 (age 58) Milan, Italy
- Plays: Right-handed
- Prize money: $491,547

Singles
- Career record: 225–198
- Career titles: 4 ITF
- Highest ranking: No. 32 (19 January 1987)

Grand Slam singles results
- French Open: 4R (1986)
- Wimbledon: 3R (1991)
- US Open: 2R (1985, 1988, 1990)

Doubles
- Career record: 142–138
- Career titles: 5 WTA, 5 ITF
- Highest ranking: No. 50 (6 May 1991)

Grand Slam doubles results
- Australian Open: 1R (1996)
- French Open: 2R (1988, 1991)
- Wimbledon: 2R (1990, 1997)
- US Open: 2R (1988, 1989)

Team competitions
- Fed Cup: 7–9
Medal record
Mediterranean Games
| Bronze medal – third place | 1983 Casablanca | Women's Doubles |

Laura Garrone (born 15 November 1967) is a former professional tennis player from Italy.

In her career, Garrone won five doubles titles on the WTA Tour. The right-hander reached her career-high ranking of world No. 32 on 19 January 1987. Her best Grand Slam finish was the fourth round at the 1986 French Open at Roland Garros.

== WTA career finals ==
=== Doubles: 7 (5 titles, 2 runners-up) ===
Legend
| Grand Slam | 0 |
| WTA Championships | 0 |
| Tier I | 0 |
| Tier II | 0 |
| Tier III | 1 |
| Tier IV & V | 4 |

Titles by surface
| Hard | 0 |
| Clay | 5 |
| Grass | 0 |
| Carpet | 0 |

| Result | W/L | Date | Tournament | Surface | Partner | Opponents | Score |
|---|---|---|---|---|---|---|---|
| Win | 1–0 | Aug 1989 | Sofia, Bulgaria | Clay | (Italy) Laura Golarsa | (West Germany) Silke Meier (Bulgaria) Elena Pampoulova | 6–4, 7–5 |
| Loss | 1–1 | May 1990 | Rome, Italy | Clay | (Italy) Laura Golarsa | (Canada) Helen Kelesi (Socialist Federal Republic of Yugoslavia) Monica Seles | 3–6, 4–6 |
| Win | 2–1 | Jul 1990 | Palermo, Italy | Clay | (Luxembourg) Karin Kschwendt | (Argentina) Florencia Labat (Italy) Barbara Romanò | 6–2, 6–4 |
| Win | 3–1 | Sep 1990 | Athens, Greece | Clay | (Luxembourg) Karin Kschwendt | (Czechoslovakia) Leona Lásková (Czechoslovakia) Jana Pospíšilová | 6–0, 1–6, 7–6^{(8–6)} |
| Loss | 3–2 | Apr 1991 | Bol, Yugoslavia | Clay | (Italy) Sandra Cecchini | (Italy) Laura Golarsa (Bulgaria) Magdalena Maleeva | Withdrew |
| Win | 4–2 | Jul 1994 | Palermo, Italy | Clay | (Romania) Ruxandra Dragomir | (Italy) Alice Canepa (Italy) Giulia Casoni | 6–1, 6–0 |
| Win | 5–2 | Sep 1995 | Warsaw, Poland | Clay | (Italy) Sandra Cecchini | (Slovakia) Henrieta Nagyová (Slovakia) Denisa Szabová | 5–7, 6–2, 6–3 |

== ITF Circuit finals ==
=== Singles: 5 (4–1) ===
$100,000 tournaments
$75,000 tournaments
$50,000 tournaments
$25,000 tournaments
$10,000 tournaments

| Result | No. | Date | Location | Surface | Opponent | Score |
|---|---|---|---|---|---|---|
| Loss | 1. | 16 April 1984 | Monviso, Italy | Clay | (Sweden) Carina Karlsson | 4–6, 5–7 |
| Win | 1. | 16 July 1984 | Cava de' Tirreni, Italy | Clay | (Bulgaria) Katerina Maleeva | 6–1, 7–5 |
| Win | 2. | 15 April 1985 | Caserta, Italy | Clay | (Italy) Laura Golarsa | 5–7, 6–2, 6–4 |
| Win | 3. | 10 May 1993 | Putignato, Italy | Hard | (Italy) Rita Grande | 2–6, 6–3, 6–1 |
| Win | 4. | 1 September 1997 | Spoleto, Italy | Clay | (Spain) Alicia Ortuño | w/o |

=== Doubles: 7 (5–2) ===
| Result | No. | Date | Location | Surface | Partner | Opponents | Score |
|---|---|---|---|---|---|---|---|
| Win | 1. | 7 September 1992 | Arzachena, Italy | Clay | (Italy) Laura Golarsa | (Italy) Linda Ferrando (Italy) Silvia Farina Elia | 6–4, 4–6, 6–4 |
| Loss | 1. | 12 July 1993 | Darmstadt, Germany | Clay | (Slovenia) Tina Križan | (Poland) Magdalena Feistel (Poland) Katarzyna Teodorowicz | 6–4, 4–6, 5–7 |
| Win | 2. | 13 June 1994 | Sezze, Italy | Clay | (Italy) Rita Grande | (Argentina) Laura Montalvo (Spain) Silvia Ramón-Cortés | 6–4, 6–4 |
| Win | 3. | 3 July 995 | Sezze, Italy | Clay | (Italy) Gloria Pizzichini | (Czech Republic) Lenka Němečková (Germany) Maja Živec-Škulj | 7–6, 6–2 |
| Win | 4. | 14 August 1995 | Maribor, Slovenia | Clay | (Slovenia) Tina Križan | (Czech Republic) Eva Melicharová (Czech Republic) Helena Vildová | 6–4, 3–6, 6–2 |
| Loss | 2. | 14 July 1996 | İstanbul, Turkey | Hard | (Italy) Flora Perfetti | (Slovenia) Tina Križan (Ukraine) Olga Lugina | 4–6, 2–6 |
| Win | 5. | 30 June 1997 | Sezze, Italy | Clay | (Italy) Elena Savoldi | (Russia) Anna Linkova (Romania) Andreea Vanc | 6–3, 6–0 |
