= Radka Bobková =

Czech tennis player

- Country (sports): Czech Republic
- Born: 12 February 1973 (age 52); Prague, Czechoslovakia
- Turned pro: 1987
- Retired: 2001
- Plays: Right-handed
- Prize money: $512,381

Singles
- Career record: 205–151
- Career titles: 2 WTA, 5 ITF
- Highest ranking: 47 (20 September 1993)

Grand Slam singles results
- Australian Open: 2R (1994, 1995)
- French Open: 2R (1994, 1996)
- Wimbledon: 2R (1994)
- US Open: 3R (1994)

Doubles
- Career record: 129–129
- Career titles: 2 WTA, 4 ITF
- Highest ranking: 59 (14 August 1995)

Grand Slam doubles results
- Australian Open: 1R (1992, 1994, 95, 96, 1998, 1999)
- French Open: 2R (1993, 1995)
- Wimbledon: 3R (1995)
- US Open: 2R (1993)

Radka Bobková (born 12 February 1973) is a former Czech professional tennis player.

Bobková has a career-high WTA singles ranking of 47, achieved on 20 September 1993. She also has a best doubles ranking of 59, reached on 14 August 1995. She won two singles titles and two doubles titles on the WTA Tour.

Bobková retired from professional tennis 2001.

== WTA career finals ==
=== Singles: 2 (2 titles) ===
Legend
Grand Slam	0
Tier I	0
Tier II	0
Tier III	0
Tier IV & V	2

Result	No.	Date	Tournament	Surface	Opponent	Score
Win	1.	May 1993	Belgian Open	Clay	(Germany) Karin Kschwendt	6–3, 4–6, 6–2
Win	2.	Jul 1993	Palermo Open, Italy	Clay	(France) Mary Pierce	6–3, 6–2

=== Doubles: 4 (2 titles, 2 runner-ups) ===
Result	No.	Date	Tournament	Surface	Partner	Opponents	Score
Win	1.	May 1993	Belgian Open	Clay	(Argentina) María José Gaidano	(Belgium) Ann Devries (Belgium) Dominique Monami	6–4, 2–6, 7–6
Win	2.	Jul 1995	Palermo Open, Italy	Clay	(Czech Republic) Petra Langrová	(Austria) Petra Schwarz (Slovakia) Katarina Studeniková	6–4, 6–1
Loss	3.	May 1996	Budapest Grand Prix, Hungary	Clay	(Czech Republic) Eva Melicharová	(United States) Katrina Adams (United States) Debbie Graham	3–6, 6–7
Loss	4.	Aug 1997	Gastein Ladies, Austria	Clay	(Germany) Wiltrud Probst	(Czech Republic) Eva Melicharová (Czech Republic) Helena Vildová	2–6, 2–6

== ITF finals ==
Legend
$75,000 tournaments
$50,000 tournaments
$25,000 tournaments
$10,000 tournaments

=== Singles (5–3) ===
Result	No.	Date	Tournament	Surface	Opponent	Score
Win	1.	23 April 1990	ITF Sutton, United Kingdom	Clay	(Czechoslovakia) Karina Habšudová	3–6, 7–5, 7–6^{(5)}
Win	2.	7 May 1990	Swansea, United Kingdom	Clay	(Czechoslovakia) Karina Habšudová	7–5, 7–5
Win	3.	20 May 1991	Katowice, Poland	Clay	(Austria) Nike Dobrovits	6–4, 4–6, 6–3
Loss	4.	10 June 1991	Mondorf-les-Bains, Luxembourg	Clay	(Socialist Federal Republic of Yugoslavia) Nadin Ercegović	6–7, 5–7
Loss	5.	6 April 1992	Caserta, Italy	Clay	(Czechoslovakia) Kateřina Šišková	4–6, 2–6
Winner	6.	10 August 1992	Sopot, Poland	Clay	(Sweden) Maria Strandlund	6–4, 4–6, 6–4
Winner	7.	25 August 1997	Orbetello, Italy	Clay	(Spain) Alicia Ortuño	6–2, 6–4
Loss	8.	10 August 1998	Bratislava, Slovakia	Clay	(Spain) María Sánchez Lorenzo	6–3, 2–6, 2–6

=== Doubles (5–6) ===
Result	No.	Date	Tournament	Surface	Partner	Opponents	Score
Loss	1.	2 October 1989	Šibenik, Yugoslavia	Clay	(Czechoslovakia) Petra Raclavská	(Sweden) Helen Jonsson (Sweden) Malin Nilsson	5–7, 7–5, 4–6
Loss	2.	9 October 1989	Bol, Yugoslavia	Clay	(Czechoslovakia) Petra Raclavská	(Czechoslovakia) Ivana Jankovská (Czechoslovakia) Eva Melicharová	3–6, 6–3, 2–6
Winner	3.	23 April 1990	Sutton, United Kingdom	Clay	(Czechoslovakia) Helena Vildová	(Australia) Lisa Keller (Australia) Robyn Mawdsley	7–6^{(8)}, 6–3
Winner	4.	10 June 1991	Mondorf-les-Bains, Luxembourg	Clay	(Spain) Ana Segura	(Czechoslovakia) Denisa Krajčovičová (Germany) Henrike Kadzidroga	6–1, 6–4
Winner	5.	15 July 1991	Karlovy Vary, Czechoslovakia	Clay	(Czechoslovakia) Karina Habšudová	(Czechoslovakia) Kateřina Šišková (Czechoslovakia) Markéta Štusková	6–1, 6–3
Loss	6.	30 March 1992	Moncalieri, Italy	Clay	(Czechoslovakia) Jana Pospíšilová	(Russia) Elena Makarova (Czechoslovakia) Kateřina Šišková	4–6, 6–2, 2–6
Win	7.	6 April 1992	Caserta, Italy	Clay	(Czechoslovakia) Jana Pospíšilová	(Spain) Estefanía Bottini (Spain) Virginia Ruano Pascual	6–3, 2–6, 7–6
Loss	8.	13 September 1993	Karlovy Vary, Czech Republic	Clay	(Czech Republic) Petra Langrová	(Slovakia) Karina Habšudová (Latvia) Larisa Neiland	3–6, 4–6
Loss	9.	4 August 1997	Sopot, Poland	Clay	(Czech Republic) Lenka Němečková	(Bulgaria) Svetlana Krivencheva (Ukraine) Elena Tatarkova	6–7, 3–6
Win	10.	22 September 1997	Thessaloniki, Greece	Clay	(Czech Republic) Jana Pospíšilová	(Russia) Maria Goloviznina (Russia) Evgenia Kulikovskaya	6–2, 6–3
Loss	11.	6 April 1998	Estoril, Portugal	Clay	(Germany) Caroline Schneider	(France) Caroline Dhenin (France) Émilie Loit	2–6, 3–6
