= 2003 Internazionali Femminili di Palermo =

- Date: 7–13 July
- Edition: 16th
- Category: Tier V
- Draw: 32S / 16D
- Prize money: $110,000
- Surface: Clay / outdoor
- Location: Palermo, Italy

Champions

Singles
- (Russia) Dinara Safina

Doubles
- (Italy) Adriana Serra Zanetti (Italy) Emily Stellato
← 2002 ·	Internazionali Femminili di Palermo	· 2004 →

The 2003 Internazionali Femminili di Palermo was a women's tennis tournament played on outdoor clay courts in Palermo, Italy that was part of the Tier V category of the 2003 WTA Tour. It was the 16th edition of the Internazionali Femminili di Palermo and took place from 7 July until 13 July 2003. Ninth-seeded Dinara Safina won the singles title and earned $16,000 first-prize money.

== Finals ==
=== Singles ===
(Russia) Dinara Safina defeated (Slovenia) Katarina Srebotnik, 6–3, 6–4

- It was Safina's only singles title of the year and the 2nd of her career.

=== Doubles ===
(Italy) Adriana Serra Zanetti / (Italy) Emily Stellato defeated (Spain) María José Martínez Sánchez / (Spain) Arantxa Parra Santonja, 6–4, 6–2
