= 2023 Marbella Master =

Padel championships

- Date: 30 May – 4 June
- Edition: 6th
- Category: Master
- Location: Marbella, Málaga, Andalusia, Spain
- Venue: Finca La Caridad

Champions
- Men's doubles: (Argentina) Agustín Tapia (Spain) Arturo Coello
- Women's doubles: (Spain) Ariana Sánchez (Spain) Paula Josemaría

Chronology

The WPT Marbella Master 2023 (officially WPT Cervezas Victoria Marbella Master 2023) was the tenth tournament of the eleventh edition of World Padel Tour, and the second Master tournament of the season. The final phase was played between May 30 and June 4, 2023 at the facilities of the Finca La Caridad in Marbella, Andalusia, Spain, while the preliminary phase was played between March 27 and 29.

In the women's category, Ariana Sánchez and Paula Josemaría won the tournament after defeating Virginia Riera and Tamara Icardo 6–1, 6–4 in the final, taking a significant step towards securing the number 1 ranking this year. The Spanish-Argentine duo, ranked number 6, reached their first final by defeating the number 2 seeds, Alejandra Salazar and Gemma Triay, in the quarterfinals.

In the men's category, Agustín Tapia and Arturo Coello won their ninth tournament out of nine played, defeating Momo González and Sanyo Gutiérrez in two sets in the final. Momo and Sanyo reached their second final as a pair, defeating the number two seeds, Franco Stupaczuk and Martín Di Nenno, in the semis.

== Registered teams ==
Male

Rnk.	Team	WPT Ranking Points
1	(Argentina) Agustín Tapia (Spain) Arturo Coello	31.125
2	(Argentina) Franco Stupaczuk (Argentina) Martín Di Nenno	20.525
3	(Spain) Alejandro Galán (Spain) Jon Sanz	19.250
4	(Spain) Momo González (Argentina) Sanyo Gutiérrez	16.330
5	(Argentina) Federico Chingotto (Spain) Paquito Navarro	13.960
6	(Spain) Alex Ruiz (Argentina) Juan Tello	13.005
7	(Argentina) Fernando Belasteguín (Spain) Miguel Yanguas	12.874
8	(Argentina) Lucho Capra (Argentina) Maxi Sánchez	8.373
9	(Spain) Iván Ramírez (Brazil) Pablo Lima	8.210
10	(Brazil) Lucas Campagnolo (Spain) Javi Garrido	7.544
11	(Spain) José García Diestro (Spain) Pincho Fernández	6.956
12	(Spain) Alejandro Arroyo (Spain) Gonzalo Rubio	5.908
13	(Spain) Coki Nieto (Spain) Pablo Cardona	5.135
14	(Spain) Francisco Gil (Argentina) Ramiro Moyano	4.862
15	(Argentina) Agustín Gutiérrez (Spain) Josete Rico	4.800
16	(Spain) Eduardo Alonso (Spain) Juanlu Esbri	4.748
17	(Brazil) Lucas Bergamini (Spain) Víctor Ruiz	4.131
18	(Spain) Jaime Muñoz (Argentina) Miguel Lamperti	3.879
19	(Spain) Javier Leal (Argentina) Juan Cruz Belluati	3.870
20	(Spain) Javier García Mora (Spain) Javier González Barahona	3.642
21	(Spain) Javi Rico (Argentina) Leo Augsburger	3.140
22	(Argentina) Agustín Gomez Silingo (Spain) Juan Martín Díaz	2.956
23	(Spain) Marc Quílez (Argentina) Valentino Libaak	2.956
24	(Spain) Antón Sans (Spain) Teodoro Zapata	2.881
25	(Spain) Ignacio Vilariño (Spain) Salvador Oria	2.821
26	(Spain) Rafael Méndez (Spain) Toni Bueno	2.708
27	(Spain) Mario del Castillo (Spain) Miguel Benítez	2.564
28	(Spain) Javier Martínez (Spain) Jorge Ruiz	2.322
Qualified from the preliminary rounds
A	(Spain) Álvaro Cepero (Spain) Mario Huete	1.627
B	(Spain) Francisco Jurado (Spain) Guillermo Collado	439
C	(Italy) Denis T. Perino (Italy) Facundo Domínguez	1.181
D	(Spain) Arnau Ayats (Spain) Francisco Guerrero	1.898

Female

Rnk.	Team	WPT Ranking Points
1	(Spain) Ariana Sánchez (Spain) Paula Josemaría	40.280
2	(Spain) Alejandra Salazar (Spain) Gemma Triay	36.980
3	(Spain) Bea González (Argentina) Delfina Brea	14.915
4	(Spain) Marta Ortega (Portugal) Sofia Araújo	13.228
5	(Argentina) Aranza Osoro (Spain) Lucía Sainz	11.672
6	(Spain) Tamara Icardo (Argentina) Virginia Riera	11.644
7	(Argentina) Claudia Jensen (Spain) Jessica Castelló	9.379
8	(Spain) Majo Sánchez Alayeto (Spain) Mapi Sánchez Alayeto	8.599
9	(France) Alix Collombon (Spain) Victoria Iglesias	7.396
10	(Italy) Carolina Orsi (Spain) Patty Llaguno	6.887
11	(Spain) Beatriz Caldera (Spain) Verónica Virseda	6.818
12	(Spain) Lorena Rufo (Spain) Marta Talaván	5.258
13	(Spain) Claudia Fernández (Argentina) Julieta Bidahorria	4.126
14	(Spain) Carla Mesa (Spain) Esther Carnicero	4.068
15	(Sweden) Carolina Navarro (Spain) Marina Guinart	3.851
16	(Spain) Nuria Rodríguez (Spain) Mª Carmen Villalba	3.784
17	(Spain) Carmen Goenaga (Spain) Marta Caparrós	3.730
18	(Spain) Lucía Martínez (Spain) Marta Barrera	3.175
19	(Spain) Eli Amatriaín (Spain) Sofía Saiz	3.071
20	(Portugal) Ana Catarina Nogueira (Spain) Melania Merino	2.940
21	(Spain) Marina Martínez (Spain) Teresa Navarro	2.872
22	(Spain) Araceli Martínez (France) Léa Godallier	2.833
23	(Spain) Arantxa Soriano (Spain) Sandra Bellver	2.652
24	(Spain) Águeda Pérez (Spain) Sara Ruiz	2.510
25	(Spain) Jimena Velasco (Spain) Noa Cánovas	2.501
26	(Italy) Emily Stellato (Italy) Giulia Sussarello	2.250
27	(Spain) Alicia Blanco (Spain) Raquel Segura	2.097
28	(Spain) Ana Fernandez de Ossó (Spain) Laia Rodríguez	1.865
Qualified from the preliminary rounds
A	(Spain) Martina Fassio (Spain) Sandra Hernández	1.769
B	(Spain) Ariadna Cañellas (Spain) Noemí Aguilar	1.009
C	(Italy) Chiara Pappacena (Italy) Giorgia Marchetti	1.229
D	(Spain) Alejandra Alonso (Spain) Andrea Ustero	1.482

Men's teams missing

Rnk.	Team	Ref.
	(Spain) Gonzalo Rubio (Spain) Javier Ruiz	(Note: Javi Ruiz was injured three tournaments ago. Gonzalo played with his former teammate Alex Arroyo until Javi recovered.)
	(Spain) Alejandro Galán (Spain) Juan Lebrón	(Note: Lebrón aggravated his arm injury two tournaments ago, at the Danish Open, forcing him to withdraw before his round of 16 match. Galán returned to action at this tournament playing with Jon Sanz, who would be his temporary partner until Lebrón recovered.)

== Schedule ==
The matches begin on Saturday with the qualifying rounds:

- Saturday 27th: Men's qualifying rounds 1 and 2.
- Sunday 28th: Men's qualifying rounds 2 and 3, and women's qualifying round 1.
- Monday 29th: Men's qualifying rounds 2 and 3 and women's qualifying rounds 2 and 3.

The main draw was played immediately afterward:

- Tuesday 30th: Round of 32.
- Wednesday 31st: Round of 32.
- Thursday 1st: Round of 16.
- Friday 2nd: Quarterfinals.
- Saturday 3rd: Semifinals.
- Sunday 4th: Finals.

== Results ==
=== Men's Bracket ===
Round of 32
1	(Spain) Coello / (Argentina) Tapia	6	6
13	(Spain) Coki / (Spain) P. Cardona	1	2
20	(Spain) J.G. Mora / (Spain) J.G. Barahona	7	3	6
28	(Spain) Martínez / (Spain) Ruiz	6	6	3
27	(Spain) Del Castillo / (Spain) Benítez	6	6
18	(Spain) J. Muñoz / (Argentina) Lamperti	1	3
21	(Spain) J. Rico / (Argentina) Augsburger	7	6
8	(Argentina) L. Capra / (Argentina) Maxi	6	4
5	(Argentina) Chingotto / (Spain) Paquito	6	7
B	(Spain) Jurado / (Spain) Collado	4	6
17	(Brazil) Bergamini / (Spain) Víctor R	6	3	6
9	(Spain) I. Ramirez / (Brazil) Lima	1	6	1
A	(Spain) A. Cepero / (Spain) M. Huete	3	4
C	(Italy) Domínguez / (Italy) Perino	6	6
16	(Spain) Edu Alonso / (Spain) J.L. Esbri	2	2
3	(Spain) Galán / (Spain) J. Sanz	6	6
4	(Spain) Momo / (Argentina) Sanyo	6	6
15	(Argentina) Agustín G. / (Spain) Josete R.	1	2
19	(Spain) J. Leal / (Argentina) J. Belluati	6	6
D	(Spain) A. Ayats / (Spain) F. Guerrero	4	2
23	(Spain) M. Quílez / (Argentina) V. Libaak	5	5
12	(Spain) A. Arroyo / (Spain) G. Rubio	7	7
25	(Spain) I. Vilariño / (Spain) S. Oria	2	5
6	(Spain) A. Ruiz / (Argentina) J. Tello	6	7
7	(Argentina) Belasteguín / (Spain) Yanguas	7	3	6
14	(Spain) F. Gil / (Argentina) R. Moyano	6	6	3
24	(Spain) A. Sans / (Spain) T. Zapata	1	3
10	(Brazil) L. Campagnolo / (Spain) J. Garrido	6	6
11	(Spain) J.G. Diestro / (Spain) Pincho F.	6	6
26	(Spain) R. Méndez / (Spain) T. Bueno	3	3
22	(Argentina) Silingo / (Spain) J.M. Díaz	2	3
2	(Argentina) Stupa / (Argentina) Di Nenno	6	6

Round of 16
1	(Spain) Coello / (Argentina) Tapia	6	7
20	(Spain) J.G. Mora / (Spain) J.G. Barahona	3	5
27	(Spain) Del Castillo / (Spain) Benítez	4	3
21	(Spain) J. Rico / (Argentina) L. Augsburger	6	6
5	(Argentina) Chingotto / (Spain) Paquito	6	6
7	(Brazil) L. Bergamini / (Spain) Víctor R	4	3
C	(Italy) Domínguez / (Italy) Perino	3	6
3	(Spain) Galán / (Spain) J. Sanz	6	7
4	(Spain) Momo / (Argentina) Sanyo	6	7
19	(Spain) J. Leal / (Argentina) J. Belluati	4	5
12	(Spain) A. Arroyo / (Spain) G. Rubio	6	6	6
6	(Spain) A. Ruiz / (Argentina) J. Tello	3	7	4
7	(Argentina) Belasteguín / (Spain) Yanguas	7	6
(Spain) J. Garrido / (Brazil) Campagnolo	6	4
11	(Spain) J.G. Diestro / (Spain) Pincho F.	2	2
2	(Argentina) Stupa / (Argentina) Di Nenno	6	6

Quarter-Final
1	(Spain) Coello / (Argentina) Tapia	6	6
21	(Argentina) Augsburger / (Spain) Javi Rico	4	4
5	(Argentina) Chingotto / (Spain) Paquito	6	6
3	(Spain) Galán / (Spain) J. Sanz	2	1
4	(Spain) Momo / (Argentina) Sanyo	7	3	6
12	(Spain) A. Arroyo / (Spain) G. Rubio	6	6	2
7	(Argentina) Belasteguín / (Spain) Yanguas	2	1
2	(Argentina) Stupa / (Argentina) Di Nenno	6	6

Semi-Finals
1	(Spain) Coello / (Argentina) Tapia	6	6
5	(Argentina) Chingotto / (Spain) Paquito	2	4
4	(Spain) Momo / (Argentina) Sanyo	3	7	6
2	(Argentina) Stupa / (Argentina) Di Nenno	6	5	4

Finals
1	(Spain) Coello / (Argentina) Tapia	6	6
4	(Spain) Momo / (Argentina) Sanyo	3	2

=== Women's Bracket ===
Round of 32
1	(Spain) Ariana / (Spain) Paula	6	6
19	(Spain) E. Amatriaín / (Spain) S. Saiz	1	1
14	(Spain) C. Mesa / (Spain) E. Carnicero	6	6
12	(Spain) L. Rufo / (Spain) M. Talaván	4	4
11	(Spain) B. Caldera / (Spain) V. Virseda	6	6	0
16	(Spain) M. Villalba / (Spain) Nuria R.	4	7	4
10	(Italy) C. Orsi / (Spain) Patty	4	7	6
5	(Argentina) Aranza / (Spain) L. Sainz	6	5	2
7	(Argentina) C. Jensen / (Spain) J. Castelló	6	6
20	(Portugal) A. Nogueira / (Spain) M. Merino	3	3
22	(Spain) A. Martínez / (France) L. Godallier	6	6
28	(Spain) Laia R. / (Spain) A.F. de Ossó	2	1
27	(Spain) A. Blanco / (Spain) R. Segura	2	1
26	(Italy) E. Stellato / (Italy) G. Sussarello	6	6
24	(Spain) Águeda P. / (Spain) Sara R.	4	3
4	(Portugal) S. Araújo / (Spain) Martita	6	6
3	(Spain) Bea G. / (Argentina) D. Brea	6	6
D	(Spain) A. Alonso / (Spain) A. Ustero	2	4
B	(Spain) A. Cañellas / (Spain) Noemí A.	3	2
21	(Spain) Marina M. / (Spain) Teresa N.	6	6
18	(Spain) Lucía M. / (Spain) M. Barrera	6	7
A	(Spain) M. Fassio / (Spain) Sandra H.	1	5
13	(Spain) Claudia F. / (Argentina) J. Bidahorria	6	5	0
8	(Spain) Majo / (Spain) Mapi	4	7	6
6	(Spain) Tamara / (Argentina) Virgínia R.	6	6
23	(Spain) Arantxa S. / (Spain) S. Bellver	3	0
17	(Spain) C. Goenaga / (Spain) M. Caparrós	6	6	0
9	(France) A. Collombon / (Spain) V. Iglesias	7	0	6
15	(Sweden) C. Navarro / (Spain) M. Guinart	6	6
(Spain) N. Cánovas / (Spain) Velasco	2	3
C	(Italy) Pappacena / (Italy) Marchetti	1	3
2	(Spain) Triay / (Spain) Salazar	6	6

Round of 16
1	(Spain) Ariana / (Spain) Paula	7	6
(Spain) Carla Mesa / (Spain) Carnicero	6	2
16	(Spain) M. Villalba / (Spain) Nuria R.	7	1	2
10	(Italy) C. Orsi / (Spain) Patty	5	6	6
7	(Argentina) C. Jensen / (Spain) J. Castelló	4	6	6
22	(Spain) A. Martínez / (France) L. Godallier	6	3	2
26	(Italy) E. Stellato / (Italy) G. Sussarello	3	5
4	(Spain) M. Ortega / (Portugal) S. Araújo	6	7
3	(Spain) Bea G. / (Argentina) D. Brea	6	6
21	(Spain) Marina M. / (Spain) Teresa N.	2	1
18	(Spain) Lucía M. / (Spain) M. Barrera	4	4
8	(Spain) Majo / (Spain) Mapi	6	6
6	(Spain) Tamara / (Argentina) Virgínia R.	7	6	6
9	(France) A. Collombon / (Spain) V. Iglesias	5	7	4
15	(Sweden) C. Navarro / (Spain) M. Guinart	2	0
2	(Spain) A. Salazar / (Spain) G. Triay	6	6

Quarter-Final
1	(Spain) Ariana / (Spain) Paula	6	6
(Italy) C. Orsi / (Spain) Patty	1	1
7	(Argentina) C. Jensen / (Spain) J. Castelló	7	4	1
4	(Spain) M. Ortega / (Portugal) S. Araújo	5	6	6
3	(Spain) Bea G. / (Argentina) D. Brea	4	5
8	(Spain) Majo / (Spain) Mapi	6	7
6	(Spain) Tamara / (Argentina) Virgínia R.	6	4	6
2	(Spain) A. Salazar / (Spain) G. Triay	1	6	4

Semi-Finals
1	(Spain) Ariana / (Spain) Paula	6	6
4	(Spain) M. Ortega / (Portugal) S. Araújo	3	1
8	(Spain) Majo / (Spain) Mapi	6	4	6
6	(Spain) Tamara / (Argentina) Virgínia R.	1	6	7

Finals
1	(Spain) Ariana / (Spain) Paula	6	6
6	(Spain) Tamara / (Argentina) Virgínia R.	1	4

=== Final qualifying round ===
Men's

Data	Qualified	WPT Ranking Point	Opponents	Result
A	(Spain) Mario Huete (Spain) Álvaro Cepero	1.627 vs 987	(Spain) Miguel A. Solbes (Spain) Miguel González	6–7 / 6–3 / 6–4
B	(Spain) Francisco Jurado (Spain) Guillermo Collado	439 vs 1.876	(Spain) Enrique Goenaga (Spain) Jairo Bautista	4–6 / 6–2 / 6–3
C	(Italy) Denis T. Perino (Italy) Facundo Domínguez	1.181 vs 495	(Italy) Martín Ariel (Spain) Pepe Aliaga	6–3 / 6–4
D	(Spain) Arnau Ayats (Spain) Francisco Guerrero	1.898 vs 1.155	(Spain) Daniel Santigosa (Spain) David Gala	4–6 / 6–3 / 6–3

Women's

Data	Qualified	WPT Ranking Point	Opponents	Result
A	(Spain) Martina Fassio (Spain) Sandra Hernández	1.769 vs 1.054	(Spain) Letizia Manquillo (Portugal) Patrícia Ribeiro	7–6 / 7–5
B	(Spain) Ariadna Cañellas (Spain) Noemí Aguilar	1.009 vs 1.108	(Spain) Aida González (Russia) Ksenia Sharifova	7–6 / 6–4
C	(Italy) Chiara Pappacena (Italy) Giorgia Marchetti	1.229 vs 822	(Brazil) Manuela Schuck (Spain) Marina Pinacho	6–4 / 7–5
D	(Spain) Alejandra Alonso (Spain) Andrea Ustero	1.482 vs 1.696	(Spain) Alicia Blanco (Spain) Lara Arruabarrena	6–2 / 6–0

=== Round of 32 ===
Men's

Date	Team A	Score	Team B	Refs.
30/5/2023	(Spain) Marc Quílez (Argentina) Valentino Libaak	5–7 / 5–7	(Spain) Alejandro Arroyo (Spain) Gonzalo Rubio	
30/5/2023	(Argentina) Federico Chingotto (Spain) Paquito Navarro	6–4 / 7–6	(Spain) Francisco Jurado (Spain) Guillermo Collado	
30/5/2023	(Spain) Mario del Castillo (Spain) Miguel Benítez	6–1 / 6–3	(Spain) Jaime Muñoz (Argentina) Miguel Lamperti	
30/5/2023	(Spain) Javi Rico (Argentina) Leo Augsburger	7–6 / 6–4	(Argentina) Lucho Capra (Argentina) Maxi Sánchez	
30/5/2023	(Spain) Ignacio Vilariño (Spain) Salvador Oria	2–6 / 5–7	(Spain) Alex Ruiz (Argentina) Juan Tello	
30/5/2023	(Brazil) Lucas Bergamini (Spain) Víctor Ruiz	6–1 / 3–6 / 6–1	(Spain) Iván Ramírez (Brazil) Pablo Lima	
30/5/2023	(Spain) Álvaro Cepero (Spain) Mario Huete	3–6 / 4–6	(Italy) Facundo Domínguez (Italy) Denis T. Perino	
30/5/2023	(Spain) Eduardo Alonso (Spain) Juanlu Esbri	2–6 / 2–6	(Spain) Alejandro Galán (Spain) Jon Sanz	
31/5/2023	(Spain) Antón Sans (Spain) Teodoro Zapata	1–6 / 3–6	(Brazil) Lucas Campagnolo (Spain) Javi Garrido	
31/5/2023	(Argentina) Agustín Gomez Silingo (Argentina) Juan Martín Díaz	2–6 / 3–6	(Argentina) Franco Stupaczuk (Argentina) Martín Di Nenno	
31/5/2023	(Argentina) Fernando Belasteguín (Spain) Miguel Yanguas	7–6 / 3–6 / 6–3	(Spain) Francisco Gil (Argentina) Ramiro Moyano	
31/5/2023	(Spain) José García Diestro (Spain) Pincho Fernández	6–3 / 6–3	(Spain) Rafael Méndez (Spain) Toni Bueno	
31/5/2023	(Spain) Momo González (Argentina) Sanyo Gutiérrez	6–1 / 6–2	(Argentina) Agustín Gutiérrez (Spain) Josete Rico	
31/5/2023	(Spain) Javier García Mora (Spain) Javier González Barahona	7–6 / 3–6 / 6–3	(Spain) Jorge Ruiz (Spain) Javier Martínez	
31/5/2023	(Spain) Javier Leal (Argentina) Juan Cruz Belluati	6–4 / 6–2	(Spain) Arnau Ayats (Spain) Francisco Guerrero	
31/5/2023	(Argentina) Agustín Tapia (Spain) Arturo Coello	6–1 / 6–2	(Spain) Coki Nieto (Spain) Pablo Cardona	

Women's

Date	Team A	Score	Team B	Refs.
30/5/2023	(Spain) Claudia Fernández (Argentina) Julieta Bidahorria	6–4 / 5–7 / 0–6	(Spain) Majo Sánchez Alayeto (Spain) Mapi Sánchez Alayeto	
30/5/2023	(Spain) Tamara Icardo (Argentina) Virginia Riera	6–3 / 60	(Spain) Arantxa Soriano (Spain) Sandra Bellver	
30/5/2023	(Spain) Carmen Goenaga (Spain) Marta Caparrós	6–7 / 6–0 / 0–6	(France) Alix Collombon (Spain) Victoria Iglesias	
30/5/2023	(Sweden) Carolina Navarro (Spain) Marina Guinart	6–2 / 6–3	(Spain) Jimena Velasco (Spain) Noa Cánovas	
30/5/2023	(Argentina) Claudia Jensen (Spain) Jessica Castelló	6–3 / 6–3	(Portugal) Ana Catarina Nogueira (Spain) Melania Merino	
30/5/2023	(Spain) Araceli Martínez (France) Léa Godallier	6–2 / 6–1	(Spain) Laia Rodríguez (Spain) Ana Fdez. de Ossó	
30/5/2023	(Spain) Beatriz Caldera (Spain) Verónica Virseda*	6–4 / 6–7 / 0–4 (*inj.)	(Spain) Mª Carmen Villalba (Spain) Nuria Rodríguez	
30/5/2023	(Spain) Alicia Blanco (Spain) Raquel Segura	2–6 / 1–6	(Italy) Emily Stellato (Italy) Giulia Sussarello	
31/5/2023	(Spain) Bea González (Argentina) Delfina Brea	6–2 / 6–4	(Spain) Alejandra Alonso (Spain) Andrea Ustero	
31/5/2023	(Spain) Ariadna Cañellas (Spain) Noemí Aguilar	3–6 / 2–6	(Spain) Marina Martínez (Spain) Teresa Navarro	
31/5/2023	(Spain) Lucía Martínez (Spain) Marta Barrera	6–1 / 7–5	(Spain) Martina Fassio (Spain) Sandra Hernández	
31/5/2023	(Italy) Chiara Pappacena (Italy) Giorgia Marchetti	1–6 / 3–6	(Spain) Alejandra Salazar (Spain) Gemma Triay	
31/5/2023	(Spain) Águeda Pérez (Spain) Sara Ruiz	4–6 / 3–6	(Spain) Marta Ortega (Portugal) Sofia Araújo	
31/5/2023	(Italy) Carolina Orsi (Spain) Patty Llaguno	4–6 / 7–5 / 6–2	(Argentina) Aranza Osoro (Spain) Lucía Sainz	
31/5/2023	(Spain) Ariana Sánchez (Spain) Paula Josemaría	6–1 / 6–1	(Spain) Eli Amatriaín (Spain) Sofía Saiz	
31/5/2023	(Spain) Carla Mesa (Spain) Esther Carnicero	6–4 / 6–4	(Spain) Lorena Rufo (Spain) Marta Talaván	

=== Round of 16 ===
Men's

Date	Team A	Score	Team B	Refs.
1/6/2023	(Argentina) Fernando Belasteguín (Spain) Miguel Yanguas	7–6 / 6–4	(Brazil) Lucas Campagnolo (Spain) Javi Garrido	
1/6/2023	(Spain) José García Diestro (Spain) Pincho Fernández	2–6 / 2–6	(Argentina) Franco Stupaczuk (Argentina) Martín Di Nenno	
1/6/2023	(Italy) Facundo Domínguez (Italy) Denis T. Perino	3–6 / 6–7	(Spain) Alejandro Galán (Spain) Jon Sanz	
1/6/2023	(Spain) Alejandro Arroyo (Spain) Gonzalo Rubio	6–3 / 6–7 / 6–4	(Spain) Alex Ruiz (Argentina) Juan Tello	
1/6/2023	(Spain) Momo González (Argentina) Sanyo Gutiérrez	6–4 / 7–5	(Spain) Javier Leal (Argentina) Juan Cruz Belluati	
1/6/2023	(Spain) Mario del Castillo (Spain) Miguel Benítez	4–6 / 3–6	(Spain) Javi Rico (Argentina) Leo Augsburger	
1/6/2023	(Argentina) Federico Chingotto (Spain) Paquito Navarro	6–4 / 6–3	(Brazil) Lucas Bergamini (Spain) Víctor Ruiz	
1/6/2023	(Argentina) Agustín Tapia (Spain) Arturo Coello	6—3 / 7—5	(Spain) Javier García Mora (Spain) Javier González Barahona	

Women's

Date	Team A	Score	Team B	Refs.
1/6/2023	(Sweden) Carolina Navarro (Spain) Marina Guinart	2–6 / 0–6	(Spain) Alejandra Salazar (Spain) Gemma Triay	
1/6/2023	(Spain) Lucía Martínez (Spain) Marta Barrera	4–6 / 4–6	(Spain) Majo Sánchez Alayeto (Spain) Mapi Sánchez Alayeto	
1/6/2023	(Spain) Tamara Icardo (Argentina) Virginia Riera	7–5 / 6–7 / 6–4	(France) Alix Collombon (Spain) Victoria Iglesias	
1/6/2023	(Spain) Bea González (Argentina) Delfina Brea	6–2 / 6–1	(Spain) Marina Martínez (Spain) Teresa Navarro	
1/6/2023	(Argentina) Claudia Jensen (Spain) Jessica Castelló	4–6 / 6–3 / 6–2	(Spain) Araceli Martínez (France) Léa Godallier	
1/6/2023	(Italy) Emily Stellato (Italy) Giulia Sussarello	3–6 / 5–7	(Spain) Marta Ortega (Portugal) Sofia Araújo	
1/6/2023	(Spain) Ariana Sánchez (Spain) Paula Josemaría	7–6 / 6–2	(Spain) Carla Mesa (Spain) Esther Carnicero	
1/6/2023	(Spain) Mª Carmen Villalba (Spain) Nuria Rodríguez	7–5 / 1–6 / 2–6	(Italy) Carolina Orsi (Spain) Patty Llaguno	

=== Quarter-Finals ===
Men's

Date	Team A	Score	Team B	Refs.
2/6/2023	(Argentina) Fernando Belasteguín (Spain) Miguel Yanguas	2–6 / 1–6	(Argentina) Franco Stupaczuk (Argentina) Martín Di Nenno	
2/6/2023	(Spain) Momo González (Argentina) Sanyo Gutiérrez	7–6 / 3–6 / 6–2	(Spain) Alejandro Arroyo (Spain) Gonzalo Rubio	
2/6/2023	(Argentina) Federico Chingotto (Spain) Paquito Navarro	6–2 / 6–1	(Spain) Alejandro Galán (Spain) Jon Sanz	
2/6/2023	(Argentina) Agustín Tapia (Spain) Arturo Coello	6–4 / 6–4	(Spain) Javi Rico (Argentina) Leo Augsburger	

Women's

Date	Team A	Score	Team B	Refs.
2/6/2023	(Spain) Bea González (Argentina) Delfina Brea	4–6 / 5–7	(Spain) Majo Sánchez Alayeto (Spain) Mapi Sánchez Alayeto	
2/6/2023	(Spain) Tamara Icardo (Argentina) Virginia Riera	6–1 / 4–6 / 6–4	(Spain) Alejandra Salazar (Spain) Gemma Triay	
2/6/2023	(Spain) Ariana Sánchez (Spain) Paula Josemaría	6–1 / 6–1	(Italy) Carolina Orsi (Spain) Patty Llaguno	
2/6/2023	(Argentina) Claudia Jensen (Spain) Jessica Castelló	7–5 / 4–6 / 1–6	(Spain) Marta Ortega (Portugal) Sofia Araújo	

=== Semi-Finals ===
Men's

Date	Team A	Score	Team B	Refs.
3/6/2023	(Argentina) Agustín Tapia (Spain) Arturo Coello	6–2 / 6–4	(Spain) Paquito Navarro (Argentina) Federico Chingotto	
3/6/2023	(Spain) Momo González (Argentina) Sanyo Gutiérrez	3–6 / 7–5 / 6–4	(Argentina) Franco Stupaczuk (Argentina) Martín Di Nenno	

Women's

Date	Team A	Score	Team B	Refs.
3/6/2023	(Spain) Majo Sánchez Alayeto (Spain) Mapi Sánchez Alayeto	6–1 / 4–6 / 6–7	(Spain) Tamara Icardo (Argentina) Virginia Riera	
3/6/2023	(Spain) Ariana Sánchez (Spain) Paula Josemaría	6–3 / 6–1	(Spain) Marta Ortega (Portugal) Sofia Araújo	

=== Finals ===
Men's

Date	Team A	Score	Team B	Refs.
4/6/2023	(Argentina) Agustín Tapia (Spain) Arturo Coello	6–3 / 6–2	(Spain) Momo González (Argentina) Sanyo Gutiérrez	

Women's

Date	Team A	Score	Team B	Refs.
4/6/2023	(Spain) Ariana Sánchez (Spain) Paula Josemaría	6–1 / 6–4	(Spain) Tamara Icardo (Argentina) Virginia Riera	
