= 2023 Vienna Open =

Padel championships

- Date: 20 May – 28 May
- Category: Open 1000
- Location: Vienna, Austria
- Venue: Steffl Arena

Champions

Men's doubles
- (Argentina) Agustín Tapia (Spain) Arturo Coello

Women's doubles
- (Spain) Ariana Sánchez (Spain) Paula Josemaría
- Vienna Open

The WPT Vienna Open 2023 (officially WPT Boss Danish Padel Open 1000 2023) was the ninth tournament of the eleventh edition of World Padel Tour. The final phase takes place between May 23 and 28, 2023 at the Steffl Arena in Vienna, Austria, while the preliminary phase was held between March 20 and 23.

In the women's category, the number 1 seeds, Ariana Sánchez and Paula Josemaría, secured their sixth title of the year by defeating the "Superpibas" Delfina Brea and Bea González 6–3, 6–1 in the final, thus avenging their semifinal loss at the previous tournament. Delfi and Bea, who reached the final after defeating Alejandra Salazar and Gemma Triay in the semifinals, broke their record streak of consecutive finals appearances.

In the men's category, the number 1 seeds Agustín Tapia and Arturo Coello once again defeated the "Superpibes" Franco Stupaczuk and Martín Di Nenno in the final, this time by a double 6–3. A confrontation that has already become "El clásico" (The Classic) of this season, having been played 8 times up to this tournament and with a record of 7–1 in favor of the "Golden Boys".

== Registered teams ==
Male

Rnk.	Team	WPT Ranking Points
1	(Argentina) Agustín Tapia (Spain) Arturo Coello	32.295
2	(Argentina) Franco Stupaczuk (Argentina) Martín Di Nenno	19.035
3	(Spain) Momo González (Argentina) Sanyo Gutiérrez	16.300
4	(Argentina) Federico Chingotto (Spain) Paquito Navarro	14.130
5	(Spain) Alex Ruiz (Argentina) Juan Tello	13.175
6	(Argentina) Fernando Belasteguín (Spain) Miguel Yanguas	12.409
7	(Argentina) Lucho Capra (Argentina) Maxi Sánchez	9.063
8	(Brazil) Lucas Campagnolo (Spain) Javi Garrido	7.004
9	(Spain) Coki Nieto (Spain) Jon Sanz	6.973
10	(Spain) José García Diestro (Spain) Pincho Fernández	6.826
11	(Spain) Alejandro Arroyo (Spain) Gonzalo Rubio	5.763
12	(Spain) Francisco Gil (Argentina) Ramiro Moyano	4.792
13	(Spain) Eduardo Alonso (Spain) Juanlu Esbri	4.773
14	(Brazil) Lucas Bergamini (Spain) Víctor Ruiz	4.121
15	(Spain) Javier Leal (Argentina) Juan Cruz Belluati	4.015
16	(Spain) Jaime Muñoz (Argentina); Miguel Lamperti	3.904
17	(Spain) Javier García Mora (Spain) Javier González Barahona	3.602
18	(Argentina) Agustín Gutiérrez (Spain) Álvaro Cepero	3.595
19	(Spain) Iván Ramírez (Spain) Pablo Cardona	3.410
20	(Spain) Javi Rico (Argentina) Leo Augsburger	3.095
21	(Argentina) Agustín Gomez Silingo (Spain) Juan Martín Díaz	2.936
22	(Spain) Josete Rico (Spain) Toni Bueno	2.855
23	(Spain) Antón Sans (Spain) Teodoro Zapata	2.809
24	(Spain) Ignacio Vilariño (Spain) Salvador Oria	2.806
25	(Spain) Marc Quílez (Argentina) Valentino Libaak	2.791
26	(Spain) Mario del Castillo (Spain) Miguel Benítez	2.579
WC	(Austria) Christoph Krenn (Austria) David Alten	50
WC	(Austria) Kristopher Sotiriu (Austria) Rainhard Boisits	0
Qualified from the preliminary rounds
A	(Chile) Javier Valdés (Spain) Joseda Sánchez	1.156
B	(Spain) Arnau Ayats (Spain) Francisco Guerrero	1.678
C	(Spain) Enrique Goenaga (Spain) Jairo Bautista	1.874
D	(Argentina) Aris Patiniotis (Spain) Emilio Sanchez Chamero	518

Female

Rnk.	Team	WPT Ranking Points
1	(Spain) Ariana Sánchez (Spain) Paula Josemaría	39.900
2	(Spain) Alejandra Salazar (Spain) Gemma Triay	36.460
3	(Spain) Marta Ortega (Portugal) Sofia Araújo	14.528
4	(Spain) Bea González (Argentina) Delfina Brea	14.125
5	(Argentina) Aranza Osoro (Spain) Lucía Sainz	12.022
6	(Spain) Tamara Icardo (Argentina) Virginia Riera	11.224
7	(Spain) Majo Sánchez Alayeto (Spain) Mapi Sánchez Alayeto	9.149
8	(Argentina) Claudia Jensen (Spain) Jessica Castelló	9.129
9	(Spain) Beatriz Caldera (Spain) Verónica Virseda	6.928
10	(Italy) Carolina Orsi (Spain) Patty Llaguno	6.662
11	(Spain) Lorena Rufo (Spain) Marta Talaván	5.188
12	(Spain) Carla Mesa (Spain) Esther Carnicero	4.168
13	(Spain) Claudia Fernández (Argentina) Julieta Bidahorria	3.966
14	(Spain) Carmen Goenaga (Spain) Marta Caparrós	3.727
15	(Spain) Mª Carmen Villalba (Spain) Nuria Rodríguez	3.714
16	(Sweden) Carolina Navarro (Spain) Marina Guinart	3.711
17	(Spain) Lucía Martínez (Spain) Marta Barrera	3.172
18	(Spain) Eli Amatriaín (Spain) Sofía Saiz	3.051
19	(Portugal) Ana Catarina Nogueira (Spain) Melania Merino	2.980
20	(Spain) Marina Martínez (Spain) Teresa Navarro	2.912
21	(Spain) Araceli Martínez (Spain) Noa Cánovas	2.898
22	(Spain) Arantxa Soriano (Spain) Sandra Bellver	2.677
23	(France) Léa Godallier (Spain) Sara Pujals	2.605
WC	(United Kingdom) Dawn Foxhall (Austria) Rebeca Fernández	16
Qualified from the preliminary rounds
A	(Spain) Águeda Pérez (Spain) Sara Ruiz	2.431
B	(Spain) Alicia Blanco (Spain) Lara Arruabarrena	1.715
C	(Russia) Ksenia Sharifova (Spain) Jimena Velasco	2.098
D	(Italy) Emily Stellato (Italy) Giulia Sussarello	2.209

Men's teams missing

Rnk.	Team	WPT Ranking Points
	(Argentina) Agustín Gutiérrez (Spain) Josete Rico	(Note: Josete Rico was injured at the Alicante Open 500 two weeks prior. Agustín would play with Álvaro Cepero in this tournament, just as he did in the previous one, the Danish Open.])
	(Brazil) Pablo Lima	(Note: Pablo Lima would also be unable to compete in this tournament due to a lingering injury. After his separation from Coki was confirmed a week prior, Pablo would play with Ivan Ramirez once he recovered.)
	(Spain) Gonzalo Rubio (Spain) Javier Ruiz	(Note: Javi Ruiz was injured two tournaments ago. Gonzalo playeed with his former teammate Alex Arroyo until Javi recovered)
	(Spain) Alejandro Galán (Spain) Juan Lebrón	(Note: Lebrón aggravated his arm injury in the previous tournament, forcing him to withdraw before his round of 16 match. Since registration for this tournament had already closed, Galán was not be able to compete, as his new temporary partner, Jon Sanz, had already registered with Coki.)

Women's teams missing

Rnk.	Team	Ref.
	(Spain) Victoria Iglesias (Spain) Patty Llaguno	(Note: Victoria Iglesias was injured at the Alicante Open 500. Patty played with Carolina Orsi.)

== Schedule ==
The matches begin on Saturday with the qualifying rounds:

- Saturday 20th: Men's qualifying rounds 1 and 2.
- Sunday 21st: Men's qualifying round 3.
- Monday 22nd: Men's qualifying round 2 and women's qualifying rounds 1 and 2.

The main draw was played immediately afterward:

- Tuesday 23rd: Round of 32 and women's qualifying round 2.
- Wednesday 24th: Round of 32.
- Thursday 25th: Round of 16.
- Friday 26th: Quarterfinals.
- Saturday 27th: Semifinals.
- Sunday 28th: Finals.

== Results ==
=== Men's Bracket ===
Round of 32
1	(Spain) Coello / (Argentina) Tapia	6	6
12	(Spain) F. Gil / (Argentina) Moyano	1	4
11	(Spain) Arroyo / (Spain) G. Rubio	3	2
14	(Brazil) Bergamini / (Spain) Víctor R.	6	6
13	(Spain) Edu Alonso / (Spain) J.L. Esbri	3	4
10	(Spain) J.G. Diestro / (Spain) Pincho	6	6
C	(Spain) Goenaga / (Spain) Bautista	1	7	4
8	(Spain) Garrido / (Brazil) Campagnolo	6	5	6
6	(Argentina) Belasteguín / (Spain) Yanguas	6	6
21	(Argentina) Silingo / (Spain) J.M. Díaz	3	3
25	(Spain) M. Quílez / (Argentina) V. Libaak	6	6	6
B	(Spain) A. Ayats / (Spain) Guerrero	3	7	3
9	(Spain) Coki / (Spain) Sanz	6	6
D	(Spain) Chamero / (Argentina) Patiniotis	3	2
26	(Spain) Benítez / (Spain) Del Castillo	3	4
3	(Spain) Momo / (Argentina) Sanyo	6	6
4	(Argentina) Chingotto / (Spain) Paquito	6	6
19	(Spain) I. Ramirez / (Spain) P. Cardona	3	1
17	(Spain) J.G. Mora / (Spain) J.G. Barahona	4	6	7
16	(Argentina) Lamperti / (Spain) J. Muñoz	6	4	6
20	(Argentina) L. Augsburger / (Spain) J. Rico	6	6
WC	(Austria) Boisits / (Austria) Sotiriu	1	3
15	(Spain) J. Leal / (Argentina) Belluati	6	7	3
5	(Spain) A. Ruiz / (Argentina) J. Tello	7	6	6
7	(Argentina) Maxi / (Argentina) L. Capra	6	6
23	(Spain) A. Sans / (Spain) T. Zapata	3	2
18	(Argentina) Agustín G. / (Spain) A. Cepero	6	6
A	(Chile) Valdés / (Spain) Joseda	2	4
WC	(Austria) Alten / (Austria) Krenn	2	0
22	(Spain) Jorge R. / (Spain) T. Bueno	6	6
24	(Spain) I. Vilariño / (Spain) S. Oria	5	6
2	(Argentina) Stupaczuk / (Argentina) Di Nenno	7	7

Round of 16
1	(Argentina) Tapia / (Spain) Coello	6	6
(Brazil) Bergamini / (Spain) Víctor R.	4	3
10	(Spain) J.G. Diestro / (Spain) P. Fernandez	4	2
8	(Spain) Garrido / (Brazil) Campagnolo	6	6
6	(Argentina) Belasteguín / (Spain) Yanguas	6	6	6
25	(Spain) M. Quílez / (Argentina) V. Libaak	2	7	1
9	(Spain) Coki / (Spain) Sanz	6	5	6
3	(Spain) Momo / (Argentina) Sanyo	1	7	4
4	(Argentina) Chingotto / (Spain) Paquito	6	6
17	(Spain) J.G. Mora / (Spain) J.G. Barahona	3	2
20	(Argentina) L. Augsburger / (Spain) J. Rico	3	6
5	(Spain) A. Ruiz / (Argentina) J. Tello	6	7
7	(Argentina) Maxi / (Argentina) L. Capra	6	7
18	(Argentina) Agustín G. / (Spain) A. Cepero	1	6
22	(Spain) Jorge R. / (Spain) T. Bueno	3	3
2	(Argentina) Stupaczuk / (Argentina) Di Nenno	6	6

Quarter-Final
1	(Spain) Coello / (Argentina) Tapia	6	7
8	(Spain) Garrido / (Brazil) Campagnolo	3	6
6	(Argentina) Belasteguín / (Spain) Yanguas	3	6	4
9	(Spain) Coki / (Spain) Sanz	6	3	6
4	(Argentina) Chingotto / (Spain) Paquito	7	5	6
5	(Spain) A. Ruiz / (Argentina) J. Tello	5	7	0
7	(Argentina) Maxi / (Argentina) L. Capra	1	2
2	(Argentina) Stupaczuk / (Argentina) Di Nenno	6	6

Semi-Finals
1	(Spain) Coello / (Argentina) Tapia	4	6	6
9	(Spain) Coki / (Spain) Sanz	6	0	2
4	(Argentina) Chingotto / (Spain) Paquito	6	0	1
2	(Argentina) Stupa / (Argentina) Di Nenno	4	6	6

Finals
1	(Spain) Coello / (Argentina) Tapia	6	6
2	(Argentina) Stupa / (Argentina) Di Nenno	3	3

=== Women's Bracket ===
Round of 32
1	(Spain) Ariana / (Spain) Paula
Bye
9	(Spain) Caldera / (Spain) Virseda	6	6
A	(Spain) Águeda / (Spain) Sara R.	2	1
22	(Spain) Arantxa / (Spain) Bellver	7	1	2
17	(Spain) Martínez / (Spain) Barrera	5	6	6
19	(Portugal) A.C. Nogueira / (Spain) M. Merino	6	3	7
8	(Spain) Castelló / (Argentina) Jensen	4	6	6
7	(Spain) Majo / (Spain) Mapi	7	6
10	(Italy) C. Orsi / (Spain) Patty	6	4
16	(Sweden) C. Navarro / (Spain) Guinart	6	6	6
18	(Spain) E. Amatriaín / (Spain) S. Saiz	1	7	4
23	(France) Godallier / (Spain) Pujals	4	2
13	(Spain) Claudia F. / (Argentina) Bidahorria	6	6
Bye
3	(Spain) M. Ortega / (Portugal) S. Araújo
4	(Spain) Bea / (Argentina) Delfi
Bye
B	(Spain) Arruabarrena / (Spain) Blanco	0	5
14	(Spain) Goenaga / (Spain) Caparrós	6	7
20	(Spain) Marina M. / (Spain) Teresa N.	3	6	4
D	(Italy) E. Stellato / (Italy) G. Sussarello	6	2	6
15	(Spain) Núria R. / (Spain) Villalba	6	2	0
5	(Argentina) A. Osoro / (Spain) L. Sainz	1	6	6
6	(Spain) Tamara / (Argentina) Virgínia R.	6	6
WC	(Austria) Fernández / (United Kingdom) Foxhall	0	0
C	(Russia) Ksenia S. / (Spain) Velasco	4	2
11	(Spain) L. Rufo / (Spain) Talaván	6	6
12	(Spain) C. Mesa / (Spain) E. Carnicero	6	2
21	(Spain) Araceli M. / (Spain) N. Cánovas	7	6
Bye
2	(Spain) Salazar / (Spain) Triay

Round of 16
1	(Spain) Ariana / (Spain) Paula	6	6
9	(Spain) Virseda / (Spain) Caldera	0	4
17	(Spain) Martínez / (Spain) Barrera	7	4	6
19	(Portugal) A.C. Nogueira / (Spain) M. Merino	6	6	1
7	(Spain) Majo / (Spain) Mapi	6	6
16	(Sweden) C. Navarro / (Spain) Guinart	4	4
13	(Spain) Claudia F. / (Argentina) Bidahorria	2	3
3	(Spain) M. Ortega / (Portugal) S. Araújo	6	6
4	(Spain) Bea / (Argentina) Delfi	6	6
14	(Spain) Caparrós / (Spain) Goenaga	1	3
D	(Italy) E. Stellato / (Italy) G. Sussarello	0	5
5	(Argentina) A. Osoro / (Spain) L. Sainz	6	7
6	(Spain) Tamara / (Argentina) Virgínia R.	7	6
11	(Spain) L. Rufo / (Spain) Talaván	5	3
21	(Spain) Araceli M. / (Spain) N. Cánovas	3	1
2	(Spain) Salazar / (Spain) Triay	6	6

Quarter-Final
1	(Spain) Ariana / (Spain) Paula	6	6
17	(Spain) Barrera / (Spain) Martínez	1	3
7	(Spain) Majo / (Spain) Mapi	2	3
3	(Spain) M. Ortega / (Portugal) S. Araújo	6	6
4	(Spain) Bea / (Argentina) Delfi	6	6
5	(Argentina) A. Osoro / (Spain) L. Sainz	2	2
6	(Spain) Tamara / (Argentina) Virgínia R.	5	1
2	(Spain) Triay / (Spain) Salazar	7	6

Semi-Finals
1	(Spain) Ariana / (Spain) Paula	6	0
3	(Spain) M. Ortega / (Portugal) S. Araújo	3	0
4	(Spain) Bea / (Argentina) Delfi	7	6
2	(Spain) Salazar / (Spain) Triay	6	2

Finals
1	(Spain) Ariana / (Spain) Paula	6	6
4	(Spain) Bea / (Argentina) Delfi	3	1

=== Final qualifying round ===
Men's

Data	Qualified	WPT Ranking Point	Opponents	Result
A	(Chile) Javier Valdés (Spain) Joseda Sánchez	1.156 vs 2.165	(Spain) Javier Martínez (Spain) Rafael Méndez	7–6 / 7–5
B	(Spain) Arnau Ayats (Spain) Francisco Guerrero	1.678 vs 1.708	(Argentina) Cristian G. Gutiérrez (Spain) Martín Sanchez Piñeiro	7–5 / 6–1
C	(Spain) Enrique Goenaga (Spain) Jairo Bautista	1.874 vs 282	(Spain) Pol Hernández (Argentina) Ramiro Valenzuela	6–2 / 6–3
D	(Argentina) Aris Patiniotis (Spain) Emilio Sanchez Chamero	518 vs 2.073	(Spain) Jesús Moya (Spain) José Solano	7–6 / 4–6 / 6–3

Women's

Data	Qualified	WPT Ranking Point	Opponents	Result
A	(Spain) Águeda Pérez (Spain) Sara Ruiz	2.431 vs 1.500	(Italy) Carlotta Casali (Spain) Marta Borrero	6–4 / 6–4
B	(Spain) Alicia Blanco (Spain) Lara Arruabarrena	1.715 vs 875	(Spain) Ariadna Cañellas (Spain) Noemí Aguilar	4–6 / 6–0 / 7–6
C	(Russia) Ksenia Sharifova (Spain) Jimena Velasco	2.098 vs 1.699	(Spain) Martina Fassio (Spain) Sandra Hernández	2–6 / 6–2 / 7–6
D	(Italy) Emily Stellato (Italy) Giulia Sussarello	2.209 vs 1.540	(Spain) Lorena Vano (Spain) Lorena Alonso	6–3 / 6–1

=== Round of 32 ===
Men's

Date	Team A	Score	Team B	Refs.
23/5/2023	(Spain) Coki Nieto (Spain) Jon Sanz	6–3 / 6–2	(Argentina) Aris Patiniotis (Spain) Emilio S. Chamero	
23/5/2023	(Argentina) Agustín Gutiérrez (Spain) Álvaro Cepero	6–2 / 6–4	(Chile) Javier Valdés (Spain) Joseda Sánchez	
23/5/2023	(Argentina) Maxi Sánchez (Argentina) Lucho Capra	6–3 / 6–2	(Spain) Antón Sans (Spain) Teodoro Zapata	
23/5/2023	(Spain) Javier Leal (Argentina) Juan Cruz Belluati	6–7 / 7–6 / 3–6	(Spain) Alex Ruiz (Argentina) Juan Tello	
23/5/2023	(Argentina) Fernando Belasteguín (Spain) Miguel Yanguas	6–3 / 6–3	(Argentina) Agustín Gomez Silingo (Spain) Juan Martín Díaz	
23/5/2023	(Spain) Alejandro Arroyo (Spain) Gonzalo Rubio	3–6 / 2–6	(Brazil) Lucas Bergamini (Spain) Víctor Ruiz	
23.5.23	(Austria) Christoph Krenn (Austria) David Alten	2–6 / 0–6	(Spain) Josete Rico (Spain) Toni Bueno	
23/5/2023	(Argentina) Agustín Tapia (Spain) Arturo Coello	6–1 / 6–4	(Spain) Francisco Gil (Argentina) Ramiro Moyano	
24/5/2023	(Spain) Javier García Mora (Spain) Javier González Barahona	4–6 / 6–4 / 7–6	(Spain) Jaime Muñoz (Argentina) Miguel Lamperti	
24/5/2023	(Spain) Mario del Castillo (Spain) Miguel Benítez	3–6 / 4–6	(Spain) Momo González (Argentina) Sanyo	
24/5/2023	(Spain) [Ignacio Vilariño (Spain) Salvador Oria	5–7 / 6–7	(Argentina) Franco Stupaczuk (Argentina) Martín Di Nenno	
24/5/2023	(Spain) Enrique Goenaga (Spain) Jairo Bautista	1–6 / 7–5 / 4–6	(Brazil) Lucas Campagnolo (Spain) Javi Garrido	
24/5/2023	(Spain) Eduardo Alonso (Spain) Juanlu Esbri	3–6 / 4–6	(Spain) José García Diestro (Spain) Pincho Fernández	
24/5/2023	(Spain) Javi Rico (Argentina) Leo Augsburger	6–1 / 6–3	(Austria) Kristopher Sotiriu (Austria) Rainhard Boisits	
24/5/2023	(Spain) Marc Quílez (Argentina) Valentino Libaak	6–3 / 6–7 / 6–3	(Spain) Arnau Ayats (Spain) Francisco Guerrero	
24/5/2023	(Argentina) Federico Chingotto (Spain) Paquito Navarro	6–3 / 6–1	(Spain) Iván Ramírez (Spain) Pablo Cardona	

Women's

Date	Team A	Score	Team B	Refs.
24/5/2023	(Spain) Majo Sánchez Alayeto (Spain) Mapi Sánchez Alayeto	7–6 / 6–4	(Italy) Carolina Orsi (Spain) Patty Llaguno	
24/5/2023	(Spain) Arantxa Soriano (Spain) Sandra Bellver	7–5 / 1–6 / 2–6	(Spain) Lucía Martínez (Spain) Marta Barrera	
24/5/2023	(Portugal) Ana Catarina Nogueira (Spain) Melania Merino	6–4 / 3–6 / 7–6	(Argentina) Claudia Jensen (Spain) Jessica Castelló	
24/5/2023	(Spain) Nuria Rodríguez (Spain) Mª Carmen Villalba	6–1 / 2–6 / 0–6	(Argentina) Aranza Osoro (Spain) Lucía Sainz	
24/5/2023	(Sweden) Carolina Navarro (Spain) Marina Guinart	6–1 / 6–7 / 6–4	(Spain) Eli Amatriaín (Spain) Sofía Saiz	
24/5/2023	(Spain) Beatriz Caldera (Spain) Verónica Virseda	6–2 / 6–1	(Spain) Águeda Pérez (Spain) Sara Ruiz	
24/5/2023	(Spain) Alicia Blanco (Spain) Lara Arruabarrena	0–6 / 5–7	(Spain) Carmen Goenaga (Spain) Marta Caparrós	
24/5/2023	(France) Léa Godallier (Spain) Sara Pujals	4–6 / 2–6	(Spain) Claudia Fernández (Argentina) Julieta Bidahorria	
24/5/2023	(Spain) Marina Martínez (Spain) Teresa Navarro	3–6 / 6–2 / 4–6	(Italy) Emily Stellato (Italy) Giulia Sussarello	
24/5/2023	(Spain) Tamara Icardo (Argentina) Virginia Riera	6–0 / 6–0	(United Kingdom) Dawn Foxhall (Austria) Rebeca Fernández	
24/5/2023	(Russia) Ksenia Sharifova (Spain) Jimena Velasco	4–6 / 2–6	(Spain) Lorena Rufo (Spain) Marta Talaván	
24/5/2023	(Spain) Carla Mesa (Spain) Esther Carnicero	6–7 / 2–6	(Spain) Araceli Martínez (Spain) Noa Cánovas	

=== Round of 16 ===
Men's

Date	Team A	Score	Team B	Refs.
25/5/2023	(Argentina) Lucho Capra (Argentina) Maxi Sánchez	6–1 / 7–6	(Argentina) Agustín Gutiérrez (Spain) Álvaro Cepero	
25/5/2023	(Spain) José García Diestro (Spain) Pincho Fernández	4–6 / 2–6	(Spain) Javi Garrido (Brazil) Lucas Campagnolo	
25/5/2023	(Spain) Coki Nieto (Spain) Jon Sanz	6–1 / 5–7 / 6–4	(Spain) Momo González (Argentina) Sanyo	
25/5/2023	(Argentina) Fernando Belasteguín (Spain) Miguel Yanguas	6–2 / 6–7 / 6–1	(Spain) Marc Quílez (Argentina) Valentino Libaak	
25/5/2023	(Argentina) Agustín Tapia (Spain) Arturo Coello	6–4 / 6–3	(Brazil) Lucas Bergamini (Spain) Víctor Ruiz	
25/5/2023	(Argentina) Federico Chingotto (Spain) Paquito Navarro	6–3 / 6–2	(Spain) Javier G. Mora (Spain) Javier G. Barahona	
25/5/2023	(Spain) Josete Rico (Spain) Toni Bueno	3–6 / 3–6	(Argentina) Franco Stupaczuk (Argentina) Martín Di Nenno	
25/5/2023	(Argentina) Leo Augsburger (Spain) Javi Rico	3–6 / 6–7	(Spain) Alex Ruiz (Argentina) Juan Tello	

Women's

Date	Team A	Score	Team B	Refs.
25/5/2023	(Spain) Ariana Sánchez (Spain) Paula Josemaría	6–0 / 6–4	(Spain) Beatriz Caldera (Spain) Verónica Virseda	
25/5/2023	(Spain) Bea González (Argentina) Delfina Brea	6–1 / 6–3	(Spain) Carmen Goenaga (Spain) Marta Caparrós	
25/5/2023	(Spain) Lucía Martínez (Spain) Marta Barrera	7–6 / 4–6 / 6–1	(Portugal) Ana Catarina Nogueira (Spain) Melania Merino	
25/5/2023	(Spain) Claudia Fernández (Argentina) Julieta Bidahorria	2–6 / 3–6	(Spain) Marta Ortega (Portugal) Sofia Araújo	
25/5/2023	(Spain) Majo Sánchez Alayeto (Spain) Mapi Sánchez Alayeto	6–4 / 6–4	(Sweden) Carolina Navarro (Spain) Marina Guinart	
25/5/2023	(Spain) Araceli Martínez (Spain) Noa Cánovas	3–6 / 1–6	(Spain) Alejandra Salazar (Spain) Gemma Triay	
25/5/2023	(Italy) Emily Stellato (Italy) Giulia Sussarello	0–6 / 5–7	(Argentina) Aranza Osoro (Spain) Lucía Sainz	
25/5/2023	(Spain) Tamara Icardo (Argentina) Virginia Riera	7–5 / 6–3	(Spain) Lorena Rufo (Spain) Marta Talaván	

=== Quarter-Finals ===
Men's

Date	Team A	Score	Team B	Refs.
26/5/2023	(Argentina) Fernando Belasteguín (Spain) Miguel Yanguas	3–6 / 6–3 / 4–6	(Spain) Coki Nieto (Spain) Jon Sanz	
26/5/2023	(Argentina) Agustín Tapia (Spain) Arturo Coello	6–3 / 7–6	(Brazil) Lucas Campagnolo (Spain) Javi Garrido	
26/5/2023	(Argentina) Federico Chingotto (Spain) Paquito Navarro	7–5 / 5–7 / 6–0	(Argentina) Juan Tello (Spain) Alex Ruiz	
26/5/2023	(Argentina) Lucho Capra (Argentina) Maxi Sánchez	1–6 / 2–6	(Argentina) Franco Stupaczuk (Argentina) Martín Di Nenno	

Women's

Date	Team A	Score	Team B	Refs.
26/5/2023	(Spain) Ariana Sánchez (Spain) Paula Josemaría	6–1 / 6–3	(Spain) Lucía Martínez (Spain) Marta Barrera	
26/5/2023	(Spain) Majo Sánchez Alayeto (Spain) Mapi Sánchez Alayeto	2–6 / 3–6	(Spain) Marta Ortega (Portugal) Sofia Araújo	
26/5/2023	(Spain) Tamara Icardo (Argentina) Virginia Riera	5–7 / 1–6	(Spain) Alejandra Salazar (Spain) Gemma Triay	
26/5/2023	(Spain) Bea González (Argentina) Delfina Brea	6–2 / 6–2	(Argentina) Aranza Osoro (Spain) Lucía Sainz	

=== Semi-Finals ===
Men's

Date	Team A	Score	Team B	Refs.
27/5/2023	(Argentina) Agustín Tapia (Spain) Arturo Coello	4–6 / 6–0 / 6–2	(Spain) Coki Nieto (Spain) Jon Sanz	
27/5/2023	(Argentina) Federico Chingotto (Spain) Paquito Navarro	6–4 / 0–6 / 1–6	(Argentina) Franco Stupaczuk (Argentina) Martín Di Nenno	

Women's

Date	Team A	Score	Team B	Refs.
27/5/2023	(Spain) Ariana Sánchez (Spain) Paula Josemaría	6–3 / 0–0 (*inj.)	(Spain) Marta Ortega (Portugal) Sofia Araújo*	
27/5/2023	(Spain) Bea González (Argentina) Delfina Brea	7–6 / 6–2	(Spain) Alejandra Salazar (Spain) Gemma Triay	

=== Finals ===
Men's

Date	Team A	Score	Team B	Refs.
28/5/2023	(Argentina) Agustín Tapia (Spain) Arturo Coello	6–3 / 6–3	(Argentina) Franco Stupaczuk (Argentina) Martín Di Nenno	

Women's

Date	Team A	Score	Team B	Refs.
28/5/2023	(Spain) Ariana Sánchez (Spain) Paula Josemaría	6–3 / 6–1	(Spain) Bea González (Argentina) Delfina Brea	
