= 2023 WPT French Open =

Padel championships

- Date: 13 June – 18 June
- Edition: 2nd
- Category: Open 1000
- Location: Toulouse, France
- Venue: Palais de sports Andre Brouat

Champions
- Men's doubles: (Argentina) Franco Stupaczuk (Argentina) Martín Di Nenno
- Women's doubles: (Spain) Ariana Sánchez (Spain) Paula Josemaría

Chronology

The WPT French Open 2023 (officially WPT Human French Padel Open 1000 2023) was the eleventh tournament of the eleventh edition of the World Padel Tour. The final phase was played between June 13 and 18, 2023 at the Palais de Sports Andre Brouat, Toulouse, France, while the preliminary phase was played between June 10 and 13.

In the women's category, Ariana Sánchez and Paula Josemaría defeated "Las Superpibas" Bea González and Delfina Brea in the final in a close match that was decided in favor of the number 1 seeds in the third-set tie-break, 6–1, 4–6, 7–6. Ariana and Paula once again had a near-perfect tournament, losing only one set throughout the entire competition.

In the men's category, the "Superpibes" Franco Stupaczuk and Martín Di Nenno secured their second WPT title of the year, defeating Federico Chingotto and Paquito Navarro 6–2, 6–4 in the final. The Argentinians played an impeccable tournament, not dropping a single set.

== Registered teams ==
Male

Rnk.	Team	WPT Ranking Points
1	(Argentina) Franco Stupaczuk (Argentina) Martín Di Nenno	22.565
2	(Spain) Alejandro Galán (Spain) Jon Sanz	18.660
3	(Spain) Momo González (Argentina) Sanyo Gutiérrez	17.260
4	(Argentina) Federico Chingotto (Spain) Paquito Navarro	15.250
5	(Spain) Alex Ruiz (Argentina) Juan Tello	12.045
6	(Argentina) Lucho Capra (Argentina) Maxi Sánchez	8.273
7	(Brazil) Lucas Campagnolo (Spain) Javi Garrido	8.056
8	(Spain) Iván Ramírez (Brazil) Pablo Lima	7.945
9	(Spain) José García Diestro (Spain) Pincho Fernández	7.046
10	(Spain) Alejandro Arroyo (Spain) Gonzalo Rubio	6.638
11	(Spain) Coki Nieto (Spain) Pablo Cardona	5.576
12	(Spain) Francisco Gil (Argentina) Ramiro Moyano	4.992
13	(Argentina) Agustín Gutiérrez (Spain) Josete Rico	4.750
14	(Spain) Eduardo Alonso (Spain) Juanlu Esbri	4.605
15	(Brazil) Lucas Bergamini (Spain) Víctor Ruiz	4.221
16	(Spain) Javier Leal (Argentina) Juan Cruz Belluati	4.105
17	(Spain) Javi Rico (Argentina) Leo Augsburger	4.005
18	(Spain) Javier García Mora (Spain) Javier González Barahona	3.973
19	(Spain) Jaime Muñoz (Argentina) Miguel Lamperti	3.725
20	(Spain) Marc Quílez (Argentina) Valentino Libaak	3.161
21	(Argentina) Agustín Gomez Silingo (Spain) Álvaro Cepero	2.933
22	(Spain) Mario del Castillo (Spain) Miguel Benítez	2.919
23	(Spain) Antón Sans (Spain) Teodoro Zapata	2.813
24	(Spain) Ignacio Vilariño (Spain) Salvador Oria	2.811
25	(Spain) Toni Bueno (Spain) Rafael Méndez	2.763
26	(Spain) Jairo Bautista (Spain) Juan Martín Díaz	2.448
WC	(France) Benjamin Tison (Spain) Víctor Manuel Mena	946
WC	(France) Bastien Blanque (France) Thomas Leygue	103
Qualified from the preliminary rounds
A	(Spain) Javier Martínez (Spain) Jorge Ruiz	2.447
B	(Spain) Álvaro Cepero (Spain) Mario Huete	939
C	(Spain) Enrique Goenaga (Spain) Luis Hernández	1.517
D	(Spain) Carlos Martí (Spain) Mario Ortega	549

Female

Rnk.	Team	WPT Ranking Points
1	(Spain) Ariana Sánchez (Spain) Paula Josemaría	42.880
2	(Spain) Gemma Triay (Spain) Marta Ortega	28.565
3	(Spain) Bea González (Argentina) Delfina Brea	16.335
4	(Spain) Tamara Icardo (Argentina) Virginia Riera	13.534
5	(Argentina) Aranza Osoro (Spain) Lucía Sainz	10.983
6	(Spain) Majo Sánchez Alayeto (Spain) Mapi Sánchez Alayeto	10.379
7	(Spain) Jessica Castelló (Portugal) Sofia Araújo	10.098
8	(Argentina) Claudia Jensen (Spain) Verónica Virseda	8.836
9	(Italy) Carolina Orsi (Spain) Patty Llaguno	6.975
10	(France) Alix Collombon (Spain) Victoria Iglesias	6.889
11	(Spain) Lorena Rufo (Spain) Marta Talaván	5.168
12	(Spain) Claudia Fernández (Argentina) Julieta Bidahorria	4.280
13	(Sweden) Carolina Navarro (Spain) Marina Guinart	4.126
14	(Spain) Lucía Martínez (Spain) Nuria Rodríguez	4.061
15	(Spain) Carmen Goenaga (Spain) Marta Caparrós	3.965
16	(Spain) Beatriz Caldera (Spain) Marta Barrera	3.783
17	(Spain) Esther Carnicero (Spain) Mª Carmen Villalba	3.293
18	(Spain) Ariadna Cañellas (Spain) Carla Mesa	3.118
19	(Spain) Araceli Martínez (France) Léa Godallier	3.108
20	(Spain) Eli Amatriaín (Spain) Sofía Saiz	3.056
21	(Spain) Marina Martínez (Spain) Teresa Navarro	3.047
22	(Portugal) Ana Catarina Nogueira (Spain) Melania Merino	3.012
23	(Spain) Águeda Pérez (Spain) Sara Ruiz	2.623
WC	(France) Lucile Pothier (France) Jessica Ginier	18
Qualified from the preliminary rounds
A	(Spain) Arantxa Soriano (Spain) Sandra Bellver	2.615
B	(Spain) Ana Fernandez De Ossó (Spain) Laia Rodríguez	1.916
C	(Spain) Alejandra Alonso (Spain) Andrea Ustero	1.634
D	(Italy) Emily Stellato (Italy) Giulia Sussarello	2.588

Men's teams missing

Rnk.	Team	Ref.	
	(Spain) Gonzalo Rubio (Spain) Javier Ruiz		(Note: Javi Ruiz was injured three tournaments ago. Gonzalo played with his former teammate Alex Arroyo until Javi recovered.)
	(Spain) Alejandro Galán (Spain) Juan Lebrón		(Note: Lebrón aggravated his arm injury three tournaments ago, at the Danish Open, forcing him to withdraw before his round of 16 match. Jon Sanz became Galán's temporary partner until Lebrón recovered.)
	(Argentina) Agustín Tapia (Spain) Arturo Coello		(Note: Agustín Tapia rested in this tournament due to discomfort in his arm that he had been suffering from for weeks.)
	(Argentina) Fernando Belasteguín (Spain) Miguel Yanguas		(Note: Belasteguin was sanctioned for his incident with the bench microphone at the Vigo Open; a financial fine and a ban from competing in this tournament.)

Women's teams missing

Rnk.	Team	Ref.	
	(Spain) Gemma Triay (Spain) Alejandra Salazar		(Note: Alejandra Salazar would undergo surgery for her elbow injury, which kept her out of competition until the end of August, according to forecasts. Gemma Triay would play with Martita Ortega until Alejandra recovered.)

== Schedule ==
The matches begin on Saturday with the qualifying rounds:

- Saturday 10th: Men's qualifying rounds 1 and 2.
- Sunday 11: 3rd round of men's qualifying.
- Monday 12: last round of men's qualifying and 1st and 2nd rounds of women's qualifying.

The final draw was played immediately afterward:

- Tuesday, the 13th: Men's Round of 32 and final round of women's qualifying.
- Wednesday 14th: Round of 32.
- Thursday 15th: Round of 16.
- Friday 16th: Quarterfinals.
- Saturday 17th: Semifinals.
- Sunday 18th: Finals.

== Results ==
=== Men's Bracket ===
Round of 32
1	(Argentina) F. Stupaczuk / (Argentina) Di Nenno	6	6
20	(Spain) M. Quílez / (Argentina) V. Libaak	0	3
22	(Spain) M. del Castillo / (Spain) M. Benítez	6	6
WC	(France) B. Blanque / (France) T. Leygue	3	4
16	(Spain) J. Leal / (Argentina) J.C. Belluati	3	6	6
WC	(France) B. Tison / (Spain) Víctor M. Mena	6	3	2
24	(Spain) I. Vilariño / (Spain) S. Oria	6	7
8	(Spain) I. Ramírez / (Brazil) Lima	4	6
7	(Brazil) L. Campagnolo / (Spain) J. Garrido	6	6
23	(Spain) A. Sans / (Spain) T. Zapata	1	2
19	(Spain) J. Muñoz / (Argentina) M. Lamperti	3	3
12	(Spain) F. Gil / (Argentina) R. Moyano	6	6
25	(Spain) R. Méndez / (Spain) T. Bueno	2	5
14	(Spain) E. Alonso / (Spain) J. Esbri	6	7
13	(Argentina) A. Gutiérrez / (Spain) J. Rico	7	3	1
3	(Spain) Momo / (Argentina) Sanyo	6	6	6
4	(Argentina) Chingotto / (Spain) Paquito	6	6
9	(Spain) J.G. Diestro / (Spain) P. Fernández	1	4
26	(Spain) J. Bautista / (Spain) J.M. Díaz	2	6	6
10	(Spain) A. Arroyo / (Spain) G. Rubio	6	4	7
18	(Spain) J.G. Mora / (Spain) J.G. Barahona	6	6
B	(Spain) A. Cepero / (Spain) M. Huete	4	4
11	(Spain) Coki / (Spain) P. Cardona	6	3
6	(Argentina) L. Capra / (Argentina) Maxi	7	6
5	(Spain) A. Ruiz / (Argentina) J. Tello	7	6
C	(Spain) E. Goenaga / (Spain) L. Hernández	5	3
D	(Spain) C. Martí / (Spain) M. Ortega	3	7	6
21	(Argentina) A. Silingo / (Spain) A. Cepero	6	6	2
A	(Spain) J. Martínez / (Spain) J. Ruiz	4	6
17	(Argentina) L. Augsburger / (Spain) J. Rico	6	7
15	(Brazil) L. Bergamini / (Spain) V. Ruiz	4	6
2	(Spain) Galán / (Spain) J. Sanz	6	7

Round of 16
1	(Argentina) F. Stupaczuk / (Argentina) Di Nenno	6	6
22	(Spain) M. del Castillo / (Spain) M. Benítez	3	3
16	(Spain) J. Leal / (Argentina) J.C. Belluati	6	2	6
24	(Spain) I. Vilariño / (Spain) S. Oria	4	6	3
7	(Brazil) L. Campagnolo / (Spain) J. Garrido	6	3
12	(Spain) F. Gil / (Argentina) R. Moyano	7	6
14	(Spain) E. Alonso / (Spain) J. Esbri	3	5
3	(Spain) Momo / (Argentina) Sanyo	6	7
4	(Argentina) Chingotto / (Spain) Paquito	6	6
10	(Spain) A. Arroyo / (Spain) G. Rubio	2	4
18	(Spain) J.G. Mora / (Spain) J.G. Barahona	6	6
6	(Argentina) L. Capra / (Argentina) Maxi	3	3
5	(Spain) A. Ruiz / (Argentina) J. Tello	5	6	6
D	(Spain) C. Martí / (Spain) M. Ortega	7	0	4
17	(Argentina) L. Augsburger / (Spain) J. Rico	1	5
2	(Spain) Galán / (Spain) J. Sanz	6	7

Quarter-Final
1	(Argentina) F. Stupaczuk / (Argentina) Di Nenno	6	6
16	(Spain) J. Leal / (Argentina) J.C. Belluati	3	3
12	(Spain) F. Gil / (Argentina) R. Moyano	6	6
3	(Spain) Momo / (Argentina) Sanyo	1	4
4	(Argentina) Chingotto / (Spain) Paquito	6	6
18	(Spain) J.G. Mora / (Spain) J.G. Barahona	2	2
5	(Spain) A. Ruiz / (Argentina) J. Tello	6	5	6
2	(Spain) Galán / (Spain) J. Sanz	4	7	7

Semi-Finals
1	(Argentina) F. Stupaczuk / (Argentina) Di Nenno	6	6
12	(Spain) F. Gil / (Argentina) R. Moyano	2	1
4	(Argentina) Chingotto / (Spain) Paquito	6	4	6
2	(Spain) Galán / (Spain) J. Sanz	3	6	2

Finals
1	(Argentina) F. Stupaczuk / (Argentina) Di Nenno	6	6
4	(Argentina) Chingotto / (Spain) Paquito	2	4

=== Women's Bracket ===
Round of 32
1	(Spain) Ariana / (Spain) Paula
Bye
A	(Spain) A. Soriano / (Spain) S. Bellver	7	6
C	(Spain) A. Alonso / (Spain) A. Ustero	6	3
12	(Spain) C. Fernández / (Argentina) J. Bidahorria	2	7	6
18	(Spain) A. Cañellas / (Spain) C. Mesa	6	5	2
13	(Sweden) C. Navarro / (Spain) M. Guinart	2	4
8	(Argentina) C. Jensen / (Spain) V. Virseda	6	6
7	(Spain) J. Castelló / (Portugal) S. Araújo	5	7	5
B	(Spain) A. De Ossó / (Spain) L. Rodríguez	7	6	7
WC	(France) L. Pothier / (France) J. Ginier	3	2
11	(Spain) L. Rufo / (Spain) M. Talaván	6	6
16	(Spain) B. Caldera / (Spain) M. Barrera	6	6	6
9	(Italy) C. Orsi / (Spain) P. Llaguno	3	7	7
Bye
4	(Spain) T. Icardo / (Argentina) V. Riera
3	(Spain) B. González / (Argentina) D. Brea
Bye
20	(Spain) E. Amatriaín / (Spain) S. Saiz	6	4	6
D	(Italy) E. Stellato / (Italy) G. Sussarello	4	6	7
10	(Spain) V. Iglesias / (France) A. Collombon	7	6
20	(Spain) A. Pérez / (Spain) S. Ruiz	5	2
21	(Spain) M. Martínez / (Spain) T. Navarro	3	3
6	(Spain) Majo / (Spain) Mapi	6	6
5	(Argentina) A. Osoro / (Spain) L. Sainz	6	1	4
22	(Portugal) A. Nogueira / (Spain) M. Merino	2	6	6
C	(Spain) C. Goenaga / (Spain) M. Caparrós	6	6
17	(Spain) E. Carnicero / (Spain) M. Villalba	4	0
14	(Spain) L. Martínez / (Spain) N. Rodríguez	6	6
19	(Spain) A. Martínez / (France) L. Godallier	4	1
Bye
2	(Spain) G. Triay / (Spain) M. Ortega

Round of 16
1	(Spain) A. Sánchez / (Spain) P. Josemaría	6	6
C	(Spain) A. Alonso / (Spain) A. Ustero	3	1
12	(Spain) C. Fernández / (Argentina) J. Bidahorria	3	2
8	(Argentina) C. Jensen / (Spain) V. Virseda	6	6
B	(Spain) A. De Ossó / (Spain) L. Rodríguez	1	1
11	(Spain) L. Rufo / (Spain) M. Talaván	6	6
9	(Italy) C. Orsi / (Spain) P. Llaguno	3	1
4	(Spain) T. Icardo / (Argentina) V. Riera	6	6
3	(Spain) B. González / (Argentina) D. Brea	6	6
D	(Italy) E. Stellato / (Italy) G. Sussarello	3	0
10	(France) A. Collombon / (Spain) V. Iglesias	5	0
6	(Spain) Majo / (Spain) Mapi	7	6
22	(Portugal) A. Nogueira / (Spain) M. Merino	7	6
C	(Spain) C. Goenaga / (Spain) M. Caparrós	5	3
14	(Spain) L. Martínez / (Spain) N. Rodríguez	4	2
2	(Spain) G. Triay / (Spain) M. Ortega	6	6

Quarter-Final
1	(Spain) A. Sánchez / (Spain) P. Josemaría	6	6
6	(Argentina) C. Jensen / (Spain) V. Virseda	3	0
11	(Spain) L. Rufo / (Spain) M. Talaván	6	3	2
4	(Spain) T. Icardo / (Argentina) V. Riera	3	6	6
3	(Spain) B. González / (Argentina) D. Brea	6	3
6	(Spain) Majo / (Spain) Mapi	1	0
22	(Portugal) A. Nogueira / (Spain) M. Merino	4	0
2	(Spain) G. Triay / (Spain) M. Ortega	6	6

Semi-Finals
1	(Spain) A. Sánchez / (Spain) P. Josemaría	6	6
4	(Spain) T. Icardo / (Argentina) V. Riera	1	0
3	(Spain) B. González / (Argentina) D. Brea	6	6
2	(Spain) G. Triay / (Spain) M. Ortega	3	0

Finals
1	(Spain) A. Sánchez / (Spain) P. Josemaría	6	4	7
3	(Spain) B. González / (Argentina) D. Brea	1	6	6

=== Final qualifying round ===
Men's

Data	Qualified	WPT Ranking Point	Opponents	Result
A	(Spain) Javier Martínez (Spain) Jorge Ruiz	2.447 vs 1.576	(Spain) Jaime Fermosell (Spain) Pablo García	6–1 / 6–4
B	(Spain) Mario Huete (Spain) Álvaro Cepero	939 vs 1.585	(Italy) Facundo Domínguez (Italy) Denis T. Perino	6–4 / 6–4
C	(Spain) Enrique Goenaga (Spain) Luis Hernández	1.517 vs 1.250	(Chile) Javier Valdés (Spain) Joseda Sánchez	6–4 / 7–6
D	(Spain) Carlos Martí (Spain) Mario Ortega	549 vs 934	(Spain) Pablo Castillo (Spain) Alonso Rodríguez	4–6 / 6–3 / 6–3

Women's

Data	Qualified	WPT Ranking Point	Opponents	Result
A	(Spain) Arantxa Soriano (Spain) Sandra Bellver	2.615 vs 1.626	(Italy) Carlotta Casali (Spain) Marta Borrero	6–2 / 6–3
B	(Spain) Ana Fernandez De Ossó (Spain) Laia Rodríguez	1.916 vs 2.581	(Spain) Jimena Velasco (Spain) Noa Cánovas	6–2 / 6–1
C	(Spain) Alejandra Alonso (Spain) Andrea Ustero	1.634 vs 1.989	(Spain) Martina Fassio (Spain) Sandra Hernández	7–6 / 6–4
D	(Italy) Emily Stellato (Italy) Giulia Sussarello	2.588 vs 1.848	(Spain) Lara Arruabarrena (Spain) Sara Pujals	5–7 / 6–3 / 6–2

=== Round of 32 ===
Men's

Date	Team A	Score	Team B	Refs.
13/6/2023	(Spain) Ignacio Vilariño (Spain) Salvador Oria	6–4 / 7–6	(Spain) Iván Ramírez (Brazil) Pablo Lima	
13/6/2023	(Spain) Carlos Martí (Spain) Mario Ortega	3–6 / 7–6 / 6–2	(Argentina) Agustín Gomez Silingo (Spain) Álvaro Cepero	
13/6/2023	(Spain) Coki Nieto (Spain) Pablo Cardona	6–7 / 3–6	(Argentina) Lucho Capra (Argentina) Maxi Sánchez	
13/6/2023	(Spain) Jairo Bautista (Spain) Juan Martín Díaz	2–6 / 6–4 / 6–7	(Spain) Alejandro Arroyo (Spain) Gonzalo Rubio	
13/6/2023	(Brazil) Lucas Campagnolo (Spain) Javi Garrido	6–1 / 6–2	(Spain) Antón Sans (Spain) Teodoro Zapata	
13/6/2023	(Spain) Javier García Mora (Spain) Javier González Barahona	6–4 / 6–4	(Spain) Álvaro Cepero (Spain) Mario Huete	
13/6/2023	(Spain) Jaime Muñoz (Argentina) Miguel Lamperti	3–6 / 3–6	(Spain) Francisco Gil (Argentina) Ramiro Moyano	
13/6/2023	(Spain) Javier Martínez (Spain) Jorge Ruiz	4–6 / 6–7	(Argentina) Leo Augsburger (Spain) Javi Rico	
14/6/2023	(Brazil) Lucas Bergamini (Spain) Víctor Ruiz	4–6 / 6–7	(Spain) Alejandro Galán (Spain) Jon Sanz	
14/6/2023	(Argentina) Franco Stupaczuk (Argentina) Martín Di Nenno	6–0 / 6–3	(Spain) Marc Quílez (Argentina) Valentino Libaak	
14/6/2023	(Argentina) Federico Chingotto (Spain) Paquito Navarro	6–1 / 6–4	(Spain) José García Diestro (Spain) Pincho Fernández	
14/6/2023	(Spain) Javier Leal (Argentina) Juan Cruz Belluati	3–6 / 6–3 / 6–2	(France) Benjamin Tison (Spain) Víctor Manuel Mena	
14/6/2023	(Spain) Rafael Méndez (Spain) Toni Bueno	2–6 / 5–7	(Spain) Eduardo Alonso (Spain) Juanlu Esbri	
14/6/2023	(Spain) Mario del Castillo (Spain) Miguel Benítez	6–3 / 6–4	(France) Bastien Blanque (France) Thomas Leygue	
14/6/2023	(Spain) Alex Ruiz (Argentina) Juan Tello	7–5 / 6–3	(Spain) Enrique Goenaga (Spain) Luis Hernández	
14/6/2023	(Argentina) Agustín Gutiérrez (Spain) Josete Rico	7–6 / 3–6 / 1–6	(Spain) Momo González (Argentina) Sanyo Gutiérrez	

Women's

Date	Team A	Score	Team B	Refs.
14/6/2023	(France) Lucile Pothier (France) Jessica Ginier	3–6 / 2–6	(Spain) Lorena Rufo (Spain) Marta Talaván	
14/6/2023	(Spain) Claudia Fernández (Argentina) Julieta Bidahorria	2–6 / 7–5 / 6–2	(Spain) Ariadna Cañellas (Spain) Carla Mesa	
14/6/2023	(Sweden) Carolina Navarro (Spain) Marina Guinart	2–6 / 4–6	(Argentina) Claudia Jensen (Spain) Verónica Virseda	
14/6/2023	(Spain) Victoria Iglesias (France) Alix Collombon	7–5 / 6–2	(Spain) Águeda Pérez (Spain) Sara Ruiz	
14/6/2023	(Spain) Jessica Castelló (Portugal) Sofia Araújo	5–7 / 7–6 / 5–7	(Spain) Ana Fernandez De Ossó (Spain) Laia Rodríguez	
14/6/2023	(Spain) Arantxa Soriano (Spain) Sandra Bellver	6–7 / 3–6	(Spain) Alejandra Alonso (Spain) Andrea Ustero	
14/6/2023	(Spain) Beatriz Caldera (Spain) Marta Barrera	6–3 / 6–7 / 6–7	(Italy) Carolina Orsi (Spain) Patty Llaguno	
14/6/2023	(Spain) Eli Amatriaín (Spain) Sofía Saiz	6–4 / 4–6 / 6–7	(Italy) Emily Stellato (Italy) Giulia Sussarello	
14/6/2023	(Spain) Lucía Martínez (Spain) Nuria Rodríguez	6–4 / 6–1	(Spain) Araceli Martínez (France) Léa Godallier	
14/6/2023	(Argentina) Aranza Osoro (Spain) Lucía Sainz	6–2 / 1–6 / 4–6	(Portugal) Ana Catarina Nogueira (Spain) Melania Merino	
14/6/2023	(Spain) Marina Martínez (Spain) Teresa Navarro	3–6 / 3–6	(Spain) Majo Sánchez Alayeto (Spain) Mapi Sánchez Alayeto	
14/6/2023	(Spain) Carmen Goenaga (Spain) Marta Caparrós	6–4 / 6–0	(Spain) Esther Carnicero (Spain) Mª Carmen Villalba	

=== Round of 16 ===
Men's

Date	Team A	Score	Team B	Refs.
15/6/2023	(Argentina) Leo Augsburger (Spain) Javi Rico	1–6 / 5–7	(Spain) Alejandro Galán (Spain) Jon Sanz	
15/6/2023	(Spain) Javier García Mora (Spain) Javier González Barahona	6–3 / 6–3	(Argentina) Lucho Capra (Argentina) Maxi Sánchez	
15/6/2023	(Argentina) Federico Chingotto (Spain) Paquito Navarro	6–2 / 6–4	(Spain) Alejandro Arroyo (Spain) Gonzalo Rubio	
15/6/2023	(Spain) Alex Ruiz (Argentina) Juan Tello	5–7 / 6–0 / 6–4	(Spain) Mario Ortega (Spain) Carlos Martí	
15/6/2023	(Argentina) Franco Stupaczuk (Argentina) Martín Di Nenno	6–3 / 6–3	(Spain) Mario del Castillo (Spain) Miguel Benítez	
15/6/2023	(Brazil) Lucas Campagnolo (Spain) Javi Garrido	6–7 / 3–6	(Spain) Francisco Gil (Argentina) Ramiro Moyano	
15/6/2023	(Spain) Javier Leal (Argentina) Juan Cruz Belluati	6–4 / 2–6 / 6–3	(Spain) Ignacio Vilariño (Spain) Salvador Oria	
15/6/2023	(Spain) Eduardo Alonso (Spain) Juanlu Esbri	3–6 / 5–7	(Spain) Momo González (Argentina) Sanyo Gutiérrez	

Women's

Date	Team A	Score	Team B	Refs.
15/6/2023	(Spain) Ariana Sánchez (Spain) Paula Josemaría	6–3 / 6–1	(Spain) Alejandra Alonso (Spain) Andrea Ustero	
15/6/2023	(Spain) Claudia Fernández (Argentina) Julieta Bidahorria	3–6 / 2–6	(Argentina) Claudia Jensen (Spain) Verónica Virseda	
15/6/2023	(Spain) Ana Fernandez De Ossó (Spain) Laia Rodríguez	1–6 / 1–6	(Spain) Lorena Rufo (Spain) Marta Talaván	
15/6/2023	(Spain) Lucía Martínez (Spain) Nuria Rodríguez	4–6 / 2–6	(Spain) Gemma Triay (Spain) Marta Ortega	
15/6/2023	(Italy) Carolina Orsi (Spain) Patty Llaguno	3–6 / 1–6	(Spain) Tamara Icardo (Argentina) Virginia Riera	
15/6/2023	(Spain) Bea González (Argentina) Delfina Brea	6–3 / 6–0	(Italy) Emily Stellato (Italy) Giulia Sussarello	
15/6/2023	(Portugal) Ana Catarina Nogueira (Spain) Melania Merino	7–5 / 6–3	(Spain) Carmen Goenaga (Spain) Marta Caparrós	
15/6/2023	(Spain) Victoria Iglesias (France) Alix Collombon	5–7 / 0–6	(Spain) Majo Sánchez Alayeto (Spain) Mapi Sánchez Alayeto	

=== Quarter-Finals ===
Men's

Date	Team A	Score	Team B	Refs.
16/6/2023	(Argentina) Federico Chingotto (Spain) Paquito Navarro	6–2 / 6–2	(Spain) Javier García Mora (Spain) Javier González Barahona	
16/6/2023	(Spain) Alex Ruiz (Argentina) Juan Tello	6–4 / 5–7 / 6–7	(Spain) Alejandro Galán (Spain) Jon Sanz	
16/6/2023	(Argentina) Franco Stupaczuk (Argentina) Martín Di Nenno	6–3 / 6–3	(Spain) Javier Leal (Argentina) Juan Cruz Belluati	
16/6/2023	(Spain) Francisco Gil (Argentina) Ramiro Moyano	6–1 / 6–4	(Spain) Momo González (Argentina) Sanyo Gutiérrez	

Women's

Date	Team A	Score	Team B	Refs.
16/6/2023	(Spain) Ariana Sánchez (Spain) Paula Josemaría	6–3 / 6–0	(Argentina) Claudia Jensen (Spain) Verónica Virseda	
16/6/2023	(Spain) Lorena Rufo (Spain) Marta Talaván	6–3 / 3–6 / 2–6	(Spain) Tamara Icardo (Argentina) Virginia Riera	
16/6/2023	(Portugal) Ana Catarina Nogueira (Spain) Melania Merino	4–6 / 0–6	(Spain) Gemma Triay (Spain) Marta Ortega	
16/6/2023	(Spain) Bea González (Argentina) Delfina Brea	6–1 / 3–0 (*inj.)	(Spain) Majo Sánchez Alayeto (Spain) Mapi Sánchez Alayeto	

=== Semi-Finals ===
Men's

Date	Team A	Score	Team B	Refs.
17/6/2023	(Argentina) Franco Stupaczuk (Argentina) Martín Di Nenno	6–2 / 6–1	(Spain) Francisco Gil (Argentina) Ramiro Moyano	
17/6/2023	(Argentina) Federico Chingotto (Spain) Paquito Navarro	6–3 / 4–6 / 6–2	(Spain) Alejandro Galán (Spain) Jon Sanz	

Women's

Date	Team A	Score	Team B	Refs.
17/6/2023	(Spain) Ariana Sánchez (Spain) Paula Josemaría	6–1 / 6–0	(Spain) Tamara Icardo (Argentina) Virginia Riera	
17/6/2023	(Spain) Bea González (Argentina) Delfina Brea	6–3 / 6–0	(Spain) Gemma Triay (Spain) Marta Ortega	

=== Finals ===
Men's

Date	Team A	Score	Team B	Refs.
18/6/2023	(Argentina) Franco Stupaczuk (Argentina) Martín Di Nenno	6–2 / 6–4	(Argentina) Federico Chingotto (Spain) Paquito Navarro	

Women's

Date	Team A	Score	Team B	Refs.
18/6/2023	(Spain) Ariana Sánchez (Spain) Paula Josemaría	6–1 / 4–6 / 7–6	(Spain) Bea González (Argentina) Delfina Brea	
