= 2003 Internazionali Femminili di Palermo – Singles =

Singles
- 2003 Internazionali Femminili di Palermo

Final
- Champion: (Russia) Dinara Safina
- Runner-up: (Slovenia) Katarina Srebotnik
- Score: 6–3, 6–4

Details
- Draw: 32 (3WC/4Q/1LL/1PR)
- Seeds: 8

Events
Singles	Doubles
← 2002 ·	Internazionali Femminili di Palermo	· 2004 →

Mariana Díaz Oliva was the defending champion, but did not compete this year.

Dinara Safina won the title by defeating Katarina Srebotnik 6–3, 6–4 in the final.

== Seeds ==
1. (Spain) Magüi Serna (second round)
2. (Czech Republic) Denisa Chládková (second round)
3. (Italy) Francesca Schiavone (quarterfinals)
4. (Slovenia) Katarina Srebotnik (final)
5. (Spain) ~~María Sánchez Lorenzo~~ (withdrew)
6. (Slovenia) Tina Pisnik (first round)
7. (France) Émilie Loit (second round)
8. (France) Virginie Razzano (quarterfinals)
9. (Russia) Dinara Safina (champion)

== Draw ==
=== Key ===
- Q = Qualifier
- WC = Wild card
- LL = Lucky loser
- Alt = Alternate
- SE = Special exempt
- PR = Protected ranking
- ITF = ITF entry
- JE = Junior exempt
- w/o = Walkover
- r = Retired
- d = Defaulted
- SR = Special ranking

=== Finals ===
Semifinals
(Slovakia) Ľudmila Cervanová	4	0
9	(Russia) Dinara Safina	6	6
4	(Slovenia) Katarina Srebotnik	6	6
PR	(Spain) Anabel Medina Garrigues	3	2

Final
9	(Russia) Dinara Safina	6	6
4	(Slovenia) Katarina Srebotnik	3	4

=== Top half ===
First round
1	(Spain) M Serna	6	3	6
(Spain) C Martínez Granados	3	6	1
(Slovakia) Ľ Cervanová	6	6
(Paraguay) R de los Ríos	4	3
(Slovakia) H Nagyová	4	7	6
(Spain) G León García	6	5	1
(Spain) C Torrens Valero	6	2	4
7	(France) É Loit	3	6	6
3/WC	(Italy) F Schiavone	0	6	6
Q	(China) Z Yan	6	4	3
LL	(Germany) J Schruff	0	4
WC	(Italy) Ad Serra Zanetti	6	6
Q	(Luxembourg) C Schaul	6	6^{8}	6
(Austria) P Wartusch	4	7^{10}	4
(Germany) An Barna	2	2
9	(Russia) D Safina	6	6

Second round
1	(Spain) M Serna	3	1
(Slovakia) Ľ Cervanová	6	6
(Slovakia) H Nagyová	6	6
7	(France) É Loit	3	2
3/WC	(Italy) F Schiavone	6	6
WC	(Italy) Ad Serra Zanetti	2	1
Q	(Luxembourg) C Schaul	5	4
9	(Russia) D Safina	7	6

Quarterfinals
(Slovakia) Ľ Cervanová	6	3	7
(Slovakia) H Nagyová	1	6	5
3/WC	(Italy) F Schiavone	3	2
9	(Russia) D Safina	6	6

Semifinals
(Slovakia) Ľ Cervanová	4	0
9	(Russia) D Safina	6	6

=== Bottom half ===
First round
6	(Slovenia) T Pisnik	4	3
Q	(Czech Republic) R Voráčová	6	6
Q	(Ukraine) Y Fedak	6	6
(France) S Cohen-Aloro	2	1
(Czech Republic) I Benešová	6^{6}	0
WC	(Italy) R Vinci	7^{8}	6
(Italy) T Garbin	2	5
4	(Slovenia) K Srebotnik	6	7
8	(France) V Razzano	6	6
(Russia) E Kulikovskaya	1	4
(Spain) M Marrero	2	3
(Czech Republic) K Koukalová	6	6
PR	(Spain) A Medina Garrigues	7	1	6
(Italy) ME Camerin	5	6	1
(Spain) A Parra Santonja	1	1
2	(Czech Republic) D Chládková	6	6

Second round
Q	(Czech Republic) R Voráčová	3	6^{4}
Q	(Ukraine) Y Fedak	6	7^{7}
WC	(Italy) R Vinci	7	0	1
4	(Slovenia) K Srebotnik	5	6	6
8	(France) V Razzano	6	6
(Czech Republic) K Koukalová	2	1
PR	(Spain) A Medina Garrigues	6	6^{4}	6
2	(Czech Republic) D Chládková	1	7^{7}	3

Quarterfinals
Q	(Ukraine) Y Fedak	5	6	1
4	(Slovenia) K Srebotnik	7	2	6
8	(France) V Razzano	6	1	6^{3}
PR	(Spain) A Medina Garrigues	2	6	7^{7}

Semifinals
4	(Slovenia) K Srebotnik	6	6
PR	(Spain) A Medina Garrigues	3	2
