= 2003 Internazionali Femminili di Palermo – Doubles =

Doubles
- 2003 Internazionali Femminili di Palermo

Final
- Champions: (Italy) Adriana Serra Zanetti (Italy) Emily Stellato
- Runners-up: (Spain) María José Martínez Sánchez (Spain) Arantxa Parra Santonja
- Score: 6–4, 6–2

Details
- Draw: 16 (1WC/1Q)
- Seeds: 4

Events
Singles	Doubles
← 2002 ·	Internazionali Femminili di Palermo	· 2004 →

Evgenia Kulikovskaya and Ekaterina Sysoeva were the defending champions, but Sysoeva did not compete this year. Kulikovskaya teamed up with Dinara Safina and lost in the quarterfinals to Li Ting and Sun Tiantian.

Wildcards Adriana Serra Zanetti and Emily Stellato won the title by defeating María José Martínez Sánchez and Arantxa Parra Santonja 6–4, 6–2 in the final.

== Seeds ==
1. (France) Caroline Dhenin / (Paraguay) Rossana de los Ríos (first round)
2. (Australia) Trudi Musgrave / (Czech Republic) Renata Voráčová (quarterfinals)
3. (Estonia) Maret Ani / (Slovakia) Henrieta Nagyová (semifinals)
4. (China) Li Ting / (China) Sun Tiantian (semifinals)

== Draw ==
=== Key ===
- Q = Qualifier
- WC = Wild card
- LL = Lucky loser
- Alt = Alternate
- SE = Special exempt
- PR = Protected ranking
- ITF = ITF entry
- JE = Junior exempt
- w/o = Walkover
- r = Retired
- d = Defaulted
- SR = Special ranking

=== Draw ===
First round
1	(France) C Dhenin (Paraguay) R de los Ríos	4	1
(Spain) MJ Martínez Sánchez (Spain) A Parra Santonja	6	6
(Spain) M Marrero (Spain) C Martínez Granados	3	4
Q	(Italy) ME Camerin (Italy) M Santangelo	6	6
4	(China) T Li (China) T Sun	7^{8}	6^{5}	6
(Italy) T Garbin (Italy) F Schiavone	6^{6}	7^{7}	3
(Ukraine) A Bondarenko (Ukraine) V Bondarenko	1	2
(Russia) E Kulikovskaya (Russia) D Safina	6	6
(Czech Republic) I Benešová (Slovakia) Ľ Cervanová	3	4
(China) Z Yan (China) J Zheng	6	6
(Croatia) I Abramović (Ukraine) Y Fedak	3	2
3	(Estonia) M Ani (Slovakia) H Nagyová	6	6
(Italy) S Disderi (Germany) J Schruff	6	3	0
WC	(Italy) Ad Serra Zanetti (Italy) E Stellato	1	6	6
(Germany) C Schneider (Italy) R Vinci	2	6^{2}
2	(Australia) T Musgrave (Czech Republic) R Voráčová	6	7^{7}

Quarterfinals
(Spain) MJ Martínez Sánchez (Spain) A Parra Santonja	7	6
Q	(Italy) ME Camerin (Italy) M Santangelo	5	1
4	(China) T Li (China) T Sun	6	6
(Russia) E Kulikovskaya (Russia) D Safina	4	2
(China) Z Yan (China) J Zheng	6^{2}	3
3	(Estonia) M Ani (Slovakia) H Nagyová	7^{7}	6
WC	(Italy) Ad Serra Zanetti (Italy) E Stellato	1	6	6
2	(Australia) T Musgrave (Czech Republic) R Voráčová	6	3	0

Semifinals
(Spain) MJ Martínez Sánchez (Spain) A Parra Santonja	6	6
4	(China) T Li (China) T Sun	4	2
3	(Estonia) M Ani (Slovakia) H Nagyová	6	4	2
WC	(Italy) Ad Serra Zanetti (Italy) E Stellato	3	6	6

Final
(Spain) MJ Martínez Sánchez (Spain) A Parra Santonja	4	2
WC	(Italy) Ad Serra Zanetti (Italy) E Stellato	6	6
