= 2004 Internazionali Femminili di Palermo – Doubles =

Doubles
- 2004 Internazionali Femminili di Palermo

Final
- Champion: (Spain) Anabel Medina Garrigues (Spain) Arantxa Sánchez Vicario
- Runner-up: (Slovakia) Ľubomíra Kurhajcová (Slovakia) Henrieta Nagyová
- Score: 6–3, 7–6^{(7–4)}

Details
- Draw: 16
- Seeds: 4

Events
Singles	Doubles
- Internazionali Femminili di Palermo

Adriana Serra Zanetti and Emily Stellato were the defending champions, but lost in the first round to eventual champions Anabel Medina Garrigues and Arantxa Sánchez Vicario.

== Seeds ==
1. (Estonia) Maret Ani / (Switzerland) Emmanuelle Gagliardi (quarterfinals)
2. (Italy) Rita Grande / (Italy) Flavia Pennetta (semifinals)
3. (Slovakia) Ľubomíra Kurhajcová / (Slovakia) Henrieta Nagyová (finals)
4. (Bosnia and Herzegovina) Mervana Jugić-Salkić / (Germany) Angelika Rösch (first round)

== Results ==
Key

- Q = Qualifier
- WC = Wild card
- LL = Lucky loser
- Alt = Alternate
- ITF = ITF entry
- PR = Protected ranking
- SR = Special ranking
- SE = Special exempt
- JE = Junior exempt
- JR = Junior Accelerator Programme entrant
- CO = College Accelerator Programme entrant
- NG = Next Gen Accelerator Program entrant
- w/o = Walkover
- r = Retired
- d = Defaulted

=== Draw ===
First round
1	(Estonia) M Ani (Switzerland) E Gagliardi	6	6
(Sweden) S Arvidsson (Germany) C Schneider	1	1
(Spain) A Medina Garrigues (Spain) A Sánchez Vicario	5	6	7
(Italy) Ad Serra Zanetti (Italy) E Stellato	7	0	5
4	(Bosnia and Herzegovina) M Jugić-Salkić (Germany) A Rösch	6^{4}	6^{6}
(Germany) J Schruff (Italy) An Serra Zanetti	7	7
LL	(Germany) A-L Grönefeld (Germany) B Rittner	6	4	7
(Ukraine) Y Fedak (Romania) A Vanc	4	6	6^{5}
Q	(Spain) L Domínguez Lino (Spain) L Pous Tió	1	6	6
(Ukraine) Y Beygelzimer (Ukraine) J Vakulenko	6	1	4
(Germany) V Henke (Germany) M Müller	6	4	1
3	(Slovakia) Ľ Kurhajcová (Slovakia) H Nagyová	3	6	6
WC	(Slovakia) Ľ Cervanová (Czech Republic) K Koukalová	6	6
(Italy) G Casoni (Croatia) D Jurak	4	3
(Spain) RM Andrés Rodríguez (Spain) C Martínez Granados	2	2
2	(Italy) R Grande (Italy) F Pennetta	6	6

Quarterfinals
1	(Estonia) M Ani (Switzerland) E Gagliardi	6	5	0
(Spain) A Medina Garrigues (Spain) A Sánchez Vicario	3	7	6
(Germany) J Schruff (Italy) An Serra Zanetti	1	0
LL	(Germany) A-L Grönefeld (Germany) B Rittner	6	6
Q	(Spain) L Domínguez Lino (Spain) L Pous Tió	3	5
3	(Slovakia) Ľ Kurhajcová (Slovakia) H Nagyová	6	7
WC	(Slovakia) Ľ Cervanová (Czech Republic) K Koukalová	2	3
2	(Italy) R Grande (Italy) F Pennetta	6	6

Semifinals
(Spain) A Medina Garrigues (Spain) A Sánchez Vicario	6	3	6
LL	(Germany) A-L Grönefeld (Germany) B Rittner	0	6	1
3	(Slovakia) Ľ Kurhajcová (Slovakia) H Nagyová	7	6
2	(Italy) R Grande (Italy) F Pennetta	5	3

Final
(Spain) A Medina Garrigues (Spain) A Sánchez Vicario	6	7
3	(Slovakia) Ľ Kurhajcová (Slovakia) H Nagyová	3	6^{4}
