= 2004 Internazionali Femminili di Palermo – Singles =

Singles
- 2004 Internazionali Femminili di Palermo

Final
- Champion: (Spain) Anabel Medina Garrigues
- Runner-up: (Italy) Flavia Pennetta
- Score: 6–4, 6–4

Details
- Draw: 32
- Seeds: 8

Events
Singles	Doubles
- Internazionali Femminili di Palermo

The defending champion, Dinara Safina, did not participate in 2004.

Anabel Medina Garrigues won her second WTA title here in 2004.

== Seeds ==
1. (Czech Republic) Klára Koukalová (quarterfinals)
2. (Spain) Anabel Medina Garrigues (champion)
3. (Czech Republic) Denisa Chládková (semifinals)
4. (Slovenia) Katarina Srebotnik (semifinals)
5. (Italy) Flavia Pennetta (final)
6. (Slovakia) Ľubomíra Kurhajcová (first round)
7. (Hungary) Melinda Czink (first round)
8. (Slovakia) Ľudmila Cervanová (quarterfinals)

== Draw ==
=== Finals ===
Semifinals
5	(Italy) Flavia Pennetta	6	7
4	(Slovenia) Katarina Srebotnik	2	6^{1}
3	(Czech Republic) Denisa Chládková	1	1
2	(Spain) Anabel Medina Garrigues	6	6

Final
5	(Italy) Flavia Pennetta	4	4
2	(Spain) Anabel Medina Garrigues	6	6

=== Top half ===
First round
1	(Czech Republic) K Koukalová	7	2	6
Q	(Croatia) D Jurak	5	6	4
(France) S Cohen-Aloro	3	1	r
(Slovakia) H Nagyová	6	2
(Ukraine) Y Fedak	6	6
(France) S Beltrame	1	1
(Bosnia and Herzegovina) M Jugić-Salkić	6^{1}	5
5	(Italy) F Pennetta	7	7
4	(Slovenia) K Srebotnik	6	6
(Sweden) S Arvidsson	3	4
Q	(Romania) D Sescioreanu	6	6
(Italy) R Grande	3	3
Q	(Belarus) A Yakimova	1	4
Q	(Poland) M Domachowska	6	6
WC	(France) S Testud	4	6^{2}
8	(Slovakia) Ľ Cervanová	6	7

Second round
1	(Czech Republic) K Koukalová	6	6
(Slovakia) H Nagyová	3	0
(Ukraine) Y Fedak	2	7	2
5	(Italy) F Pennetta	6	6^{4}	6
4	(Slovenia) K Srebotnik	6	3	6
Q	(Romania) D Sescioreanu	1	6	3
Q	(Poland) M Domachowska	4	4
8	(Slovakia) Ľ Cervanová	6	6

Quarterfinals
1	(Czech Republic) K Koukalová	4	2
5	(Italy) F Pennetta	6	6
4	(Slovenia) K Srebotnik	6	6
8	(Slovakia) Ľ Cervanová	3	4

Semifinals
5	(Italy) F Pennetta	6	7
4	(Slovenia) K Srebotnik	2	6^{1}

=== Bottom half ===
First round
6	(Slovakia) Ľ Kurhajcová	5	6	2
(Italy) An Serra Zanetti	7	3	6
WC	(Italy) G Casoni	3	0
(Spain) C Martínez Granados	6	6
(Ukraine) Y Beygelzimer	4	6	6
(Italy) Ad Serra Zanetti	6	2	0
(Germany) B Rittner	6	5	4
3	(Czech Republic) D Chládková	4	7	6
7	(Hungary) M Czink	4	6	3
(Germany) A-L Grönefeld	6	3	6
(Spain) N Llagostera Vives	4	6	3
(Switzerland) E Gagliardi	6	4	6
(Germany) J Schruff	3	3
(Italy) R Vinci	6	6
(Ukraine) J Vakulenko	5	3
2	(Spain) A Medina Garrigues	7	6

Second round
(Italy) An Serra Zanetti	6	6
(Spain) C Martínez Granados	4	0
(Ukraine) Y Beygelzimer	3	1
3	(Czech Republic) D Chládková	6	6
(Germany) A-L Grönefeld	6	6
(Switzerland) E Gagliardi	0	3
(Italy) R Vinci	6^{3}	2
2	(Spain) A Medina Garrigues	7	6

Quarterfinals
(Italy) An Serra Zanetti	4	1
3	(Czech Republic) D Chládková	6	6
(Germany) A-L Grönefeld	4	3
2	(Spain) A Medina Garrigues	6	6

Semifinals
3	(Czech Republic) D Chládková	1	1
2	(Spain) A Medina Garrigues	6	6
