= Lucía Martínez =

Puerto Rican windsurfer

Personal information
- Birth name: Lucía Martínez Colón
- Nickname: Rosarito
- Nationality: Puerto Rican
- Born: 10 October 1961 (age 63)

Sport
- Sport: Windsurfing

Lucía Martínez Colón (Note: In this Spanish name, the first or paternal surname is Martínez and the second or maternal family name is Colón.) (born 10 October 1961) is a Puerto Rican windsurfer. She competed in the 1992 Summer Olympics and the 1996 Summer Olympics.
