= 2004 Internazionali Femminili di Palermo =

- Date: 19–25 July
- Edition: 17th
- Category: Tier V
- Draw: 32S / 16D
- Prize money: $110,000
- Surface: Clay / outdoor
- Location: Palermo, Italy

Champions

Singles
- (Spain) Anabel Medina Garrigues

Doubles
- (Spain) Anabel Medina Garrigues (Spain) Arantxa Sánchez Vicario
- Internazionali Femminili di Palermo

The 2004 Internazionali Femminili di Palermo was a women's tennis tournament played on outdoor clay courts in Palermo, Italy that was part of the Tier V category of the 2004 WTA Tour. It was the 17th edition of the Internazionali Femminili di Palermo and took place from 19 July until 25 July 2004. Second-seeded Anabel Medina Garrigues won the singles title and earned $16,000 first-prize money.

== Finals ==
=== Singles ===
(Spain) Anabel Medina Garrigues defeated (Italy) Flavia Pennetta, 6–4, 6–4

- It was Medina Garrigues' 1st singles title of the year and the 2nd of her career.

=== Doubles ===
(Spain) Anabel Medina Garrigues / (Spain) Arantxa Sánchez Vicario defeated (Slovakia) Ľubomíra Kurhajcová / (Slovakia) Henrieta Nagyová, 6–3, 7–6^{(7–4)}
