= 2023 Danish Open =

Padel championships

- Date: 13 May – 21 May
- Category: Open 1000
- Location: Hillerød, Denmark
- Venue: Royal Stage

Champions
- Men's doubles: (Argentina) Franco Stupaczuk (Argentina) Martín Di Nenno
- Women's doubles: (Spain) Beatriz González (Argentina) Delfina Brea

Chronology

The WPT Danish Open 2023 (officially WPT Cupra Danish Padel Open 1000 2023) was the eight tournament of the eleventh edition of World Padel Tour. The final phase was held between May 16 and 21, 2023 at the "Royal Stage" facilities, while the preliminary phase was played between March 13 and 16.

In the women's category, the "Superpibas" Bea González and Delfina Brea broke the hegemony of the top two ranked pairs, after many months in which only they had won tournaments. The Spanish-Argentine duo defeated the number 1 seeds Ariana Sánchez and Paula Josemaría in the semifinals 7–5, 7–6 after an incredible comeback, and in the final they beat the number 2 seeds Alejandra Salazar and Gemma Triay for the first time this year, 6–2, 3–6, 6–4. By winning the tournament, Delfi Brea and Bea González showed that they were an alternative to the established powerhouses on a women's circuit dominated in recent times by Arianna, Paula, Gemma, and Alejandra. The latter two continue to extend their record for consecutive finals played and reduced the gap to the number 1 seeds.

In the men's category, the "Superpibes" Franco Stupaczuk and Martín Di Nenno seized their opportunity, with the top two ranked pairs withdrawing, and won their second tournament this year (their first World Padel Tour title) by defeating Momo González and Sanyo Gutiérrez 6–3, 6–2 in the final, having won all five of their matches in straight sets. Just like Delfi and Bea on the women's circuit, Stupaczuk and Di Nenno positioned themselves as the alternative to the established powerhouses Alejandro Galán, Juan Lebrón, Agustín Tapia, and Arturo Coello. After the finals win the "Superpibes" became the number 2 pair in the "race" and establishing themselves as candidates to fight for number 1 this year.

== Relevant data ==
=== Without the two best male pairs ===
Just before the tournament started, the brand new number 1 Arturo Coello and Agustín Tapia announced that they would not be able to participate, due to an overload of Arturo. On the other hand, Alejandro Galán and Juan Lebrón also had to withdraw from the tournament before starting their round of 16 match, due to a relapse of Lebrón, who had not yet fully recovered from his arm injury. Without the two top seeds, the "Superpibes" (ranked number 3 pair) seized their opportunity and won the tournament.

In this way, since Tapia was defending many points this week, he and Coello were going to lose the number 1 ranking at the end of the week, regardless of what Galán and Lebrón did in the tournament.

=== Pair changes in the lower-middle part of the bracket ===
New pairings were formed for this tournament, some permanent and others circumstantial. The separation of the Catalans Marc Quílez and Toni Bueno and the Argentinians Miguel Lamperti and Valentino Libaak also provoked the separation of Jaime Muñoz and Ignacio Vilariño, therefore, the following exchange took place: Quílez with Libaak, Lamperti with Muñoz and Toni Bueno with Vilariño.

=== First Italian in the quarterfinals ===
Victoria Iglesias injury led her partner, Patty Llaguno, to look for a replacement for the tournament, and she chose the Italian Carolina Orsi. This allowed Patty to return to playing on the backhand side, her natural position. In her debut, they defeated the twins Mapi and Majo Sánchez Alayeto in three sets. Then, in the round of 16, they beat the C-ranked qualified team, reaching the quarterfinals and making Carolina Orsi the first Italian player to reach this stage of a World Padel Tour tournament. However, they lost to the number 1 seeds.

== Registered teams ==
Male

Rnk.	Team	WPT Ranking Points
1	(Spain) Alejandro Galán (Spain) Juan Lebrón	32.830
2	(Argentina) Agustín Tapia (Spain) Arturo Coello	30.295
3	(Argentina) Franco Stupaczuk (Argentina) Martín Di Nenno	18.315
4	(Spain) Momo González (Argentina) Sanyo Gutiérrez	15.580
5	(Argentina) Federico Chingotto (Spain) Paquito Navarro	13.770
6	(Spain) Alex Ruiz (Argentina) Juan Tello	12.815
7	(Argentina) Fernando Belasteguín (Spain) Miguel Yanguas	12.049
8	(Brazil) Lucas Campagnolo (Argentina) Maxi Sánchez	7.338
9	(Spain) Alejandro Arroyo (Argentina) Lucho Capra	6.954
10	(Spain) Javi Garrido (Spain) Jon Sanz	6.656
11	(Spain) José García Diestro (Spain) Pincho Fernández	6.646
12	(Spain) Francisco Gil (Argentina) Ramiro Moyano	4.722
13	(Spain) Eduardo Alonso (Spain) Juanlu Esbri	4.593
14	(Spain) Javier Leal (Argentina) Juan Cruz Belluati	3.945
15	(Brazil) Lucas Bergamini (Spain) Víctor Ruiz	3.941
16	(Spain) Jaime Muñoz (Argentina) Miguel Lamperti	3.824
17	(Argentina) Agustín Gutiérrez (Spain) Álvaro Cepero	3.595
18	(Spain) Javier García Mora (Spain) Javier González Barahona	3.422
19	(Spain) Iván Ramírez (Spain) Pablo Cardona	3.230
20	(Argentina) Leo Augsburger (Spain) Javi Rico	3.025
21	(Argentina) Agustín Gomez Silingo (Argentina) Juan Martín Díaz	2.866
22	(Spain) Ignacio Vilariño (Spain) Toni Bueno	2.826
23	(Spain) Antón Sans (Spain) Teodoro Zapata	2.739
24	(Spain) Marc Quílez (Argentina) Valentino Libaak	2.721
25	(Spain) Josete Rico (Spain) Salvador Oria	2.695
26	(Spain) Javier Martínez (Spain) Rafael Méndez	2.095
WC	(Denmark) Esben Hess-Olesen (Denmark) Nils Skajaa	50
WC	(Denmark) Emil Domela Hansen (Denmark) Marc Andreas Moller	20
Qualified from the preliminary rounds
A	(Spain) Borja Yribarren (Spain) Cristóbal García	1.211
B	(Argentina) Aris Patiniotis (Spain) Emilio S. Chamero	492
C	(Spain) Cándido Jorge Alfaro (Italy) Enzo Jensen	781
D	(Spain) Arnau Ayats (Spain) Francisco Guerrero	1.636

Female

Rnk.	Team	WPT Ranking Points
1	(Spain) Ariana Sánchez (Spain) Paula Josemaría	37.900
2	(Spain) Alejandra Salazar (Spain) Gemma Triay	35.260
3	(Spain) Marta Ortega (Portugal) Sofia Araújo	13.808
4	(Spain) Bea González (Argentina) Delfina Brea	13.405
5	(Argentina) Aranza Osoro (Spain) Lucía Sainz	11.662
6	(Spain) Tamara Icardo (Argentina) Virginia Riera	10.864
7	(Spain) Majo Sánchez Alayeto (Spain) Mapi Sánchez Alayeto	8.789
8	(Argentina) Claudia Jensen (Spain) Jessica Castelló	8.769
9	(Italy) Carolina Orsi (Spain) Patty Laguno	6.572
10	(Spain) Lorena Rufo (Spain) Marta Talaván	5.008
11	(Spain) Carla Mesa (Spain) Esther Carnicero	4.098
12	(Spain) Claudia Fernández (Argentina) Julieta Bidahorria	3.786
13	(Spain) Carmen Goenaga (Spain) Marta Caparrós	3.547
14	(Spain) Mª Carmen Villalba (Spain) Nuria Rodríguez	3.534
15	(Sweden) Carolina Navarro (Spain) Marina Guinart	3.531
16	(Spain) Alejandra Alonso (France) Alix Collombon	3.506
17	(Spain) Lucía Martínez (Spain) Marta Barrera	3.102
18	(Portugal) Ana Catarina Nogueira (Spain) Melania Merino	2.910
19	(Spain) Eli Amatriaín (Spain) Sofía Saiz	2.871
20	(Spain) Araceli Martínez (Spain) Noa Cánovas	2.828
21	(Spain) Marina Martínez (Spain) Teresa Navarro	2.732
22	(Spain) Arantxa Soriano (Spain) Sandra Bellver	2.607
23	(Italy) Giulia Sussarello (France) Léa Godallier	2.532
WC	(Denmark) Gitte Haxen (Denmark) Maria Rasmussen	76
Qualified from the preliminary rounds
A	(Spain) Águeda Pérez (Spain) Sara Ruiz	2.361
B	(Spain) Ariadna Cañellas (Spain) Noemí Aguilar	791
C	(Spain) Ana Fernandez De Ossó (Spain) Laia Rodríguez	1.687
D	(Italy) Carlotta Casali (Spain) Marta Borrero	1.430

Men's teams missing

Rnk.	Team	WPT Ranking Points
	(Argentina) Agustín Gutiérrez (Spain) Josete Rico	(Note: Josete Rico was injured at the Alicante Open 500 last week. Agustín would play with Álvaro Cepero in this tournament and the next, the Vienna Open.)
	(Spain) Coki (Brazil) Pablo Lima	(Note: Pablo Lima was also be unable to compete in this tournament due to an ongoing injury. Following this, the pair announced their separation.)
	(Spain) Gonzalo Rubio (Spain) Javier Ruiz	(Note: Javi Ruiz was injured in the previous tournament.)
	(Spain) Mario del Castillo (Spain) Miguel Benítez	

Women's teams missing

Rnk.	Team	Ref.
	(Spain) Patty Llaguno (Spain) Victoria Iglesias	(Note: Victoria Iglesias was injured at the Alicante Open 500. Patty would play with Carolina Orsi.)
	(Spain) Beatriz Caldera (Spain) Verónica Virseda	(Note: Verónica Virseda had been suffering from plantar fasciitis for two months, so she missed the tournament to recover.)

== Schedule ==
The matches begin on Saturday with the qualifying rounds:

- Saturday 13th: Men's qualifying rounds 1 and 2.
- Sunday 14th: Men's qualifying round 3.
- Monday 15th: Men's qualifying round 2 and women's qualifying rounds 1 and 2.

The main draw was played immediately afterward:

- Tuesday 16th: Round of 32 and women's qualifying round 2.
- Wednesday 17th: Round of 32.
- Thursday 18th: Round of 16.
- Friday 19th: Quarterfinals.
- Saturday 20th: Semifinals.
- Sunday 21st: Finals.

== Results ==
=== Men's Bracket ===
Round of 32
1	(Spain) Galán / (Spain) Lebrón	6	6
(Denmark) E. Hansen / (Denmark) M. Moller (WC)	0	0
9	(Spain) Arroyo / (Argentina) Capra	7	6
(Spain) B. Yribarren / (Spain) C. García (A)	6	2
(Spain) C. Alfaro / (Italy) Enzo Jensen (C)	0	0
18	(Spain) J.G. Mora / (Spain) J.G. Barahona	6	6
14	(Spain) Javier Leal / (Argentina) Juan Cruz Belluati	3	6	1
8	(Brazil) Campagnolo / (Argentina) Sánchez	6	4	6
6	(Spain) A. Ruiz / (Argentina) J. Tello	6	6
13	(Spain) E. Alonso / (Spain) J. Esbri	1	4
(Denmark) Hess-Olesen / (Denmark) N. Skajaa (WC)	3	0
23	(Spain) A. Sans / (Spain) T. Zapata	6	6
12	(Spain) F. Gil / (Argentina) R. Moyano	7	7
25	(Spain) J. Rico / (Spain) S. Oria	5	6
17	(Argentina) A. Gutiérrez / (Spain) A. Cepero	1	6
3	(Argentina) Stupaczuk / (Argentina) Di Nenno	6	7
4	(Spain) Momo González / (Argentina) Sanyo Gutiérrez	6	6
(Argentina) A. Patiniotis / (Spain) E. Chamero (B)	3	1
(Spain) A. Ayats / (Spain) F. Guerrero (D)	6	6
22	(Spain) I. Vilariño / (Spain) T. Bueno	1	3
26	(Spain) J. Martínez / (Spain) R. Méndez	4	6
11	(Spain) J.G. Diestro / (Spain) P. Fernández	6	7
20	(Argentina) Augsburger / (Spain) J. Rico	0	3
5	(Argentina) Chingotto / (Spain) Paquito	6	6
7	(Argentina) Belasteguín / (Spain) Yanguas	7	7
19	(Spain) I. Ramírez / (Spain) P. Cardona	5	5
15	(Brazil) Bergamini / (Spain) V. Ruiz	6	7
21	(Argentina) Silingo / (Spain) J.M. Díaz	3	5
16	(Spain) J. Muñoz / (Argentina) Lamperti	3	6	3
24	(Spain) M. Quílez / (Argentina) Libaak	6	4	6
10	(Spain) J. Garrido / (Spain) J. Sanz
2	(Argentina) Tapia / (Spain) Coello	*

Round of 16
1	(Spain) Galán / (Spain) Lebrón	*
9	(Spain) Arroyo / (Argentina) Capra
18	(Spain) J.G. Mora / (Spain) J.G. Barahona	3	2
8	(Brazil) Campagnolo / (Argentina) Sánchez	6	6
6	(Spain) A. Ruiz / (Argentina) Tello	6	4	6
23	(Spain) A. Sans / (Spain) T. Zapata	2	6	0
12	(Spain) F. Gil / (Argentina) R. Moyano	3	5
3	(Argentina) Stupaczuk / (Argentina) Di Nenno	6	7
4	(Spain) Momo / (Argentina) Sanyo	6	6
(Spain) A. Ayats / (Spain) F. Guerrero (D)	4	1
11	(Spain) J.G. Diestro / (Spain) P. Fernández	1	1
5	(Argentina) Chingotto / (Spain) Paquito	6	6
7	(Argentina) Belasteguín / (Spain) Yanguas	2	6	6
15	(Brazil) Bergamini / (Spain) V. Ruiz	6	1	4
16	(Spain) M. Quílez / (Argentina) Libaak	3	2
10	(Spain) Garrido / (Spain) Sanz	6	6

Quarter-Final
9	(Spain) Arroyo / (Argentina) Capra	4	3
8	(Brazil) Campagnolo / (Argentina) Sánchez	6	6
6	(Spain) A. Ruiz / (Argentina) Tello	1	5
3	(Argentina) Stupaczuk / (Argentina) Di Nenno	6	7
4	(Spain) Momo / (Argentina) Sanyo	7	3	6
5	(Argentina) Chingotto / (Spain) Paquito	5	6	4
7	(Argentina) Belasteguín / (Spain) Yanguas	3	6	7
10	(Spain) Garrido / (Spain) Sanz	6	4	5

Semi-Finals
8	(Brazil) Campagnolo / (Argentina) Maxi	5	2
3	(Argentina) Stupaczuk / (Argentina) Di Nenno	7	6
4	(Spain) Momo / (Argentina) Sanyo	6	4	6
7	(Argentina) Belasteguín / (Spain) Yanguas	4	6	3

Finals
3	(Argentina) Stupaczuk / (Argentina) Di Nenno	6	6
4	(Spain) Momo / (Argentina) Sanyo	3	2

=== Women's Bracket ===
Round of 32
1	(Spain) A. Sánchez / (Spain) P. Josemaria
Bye
A	(Spain) A. Pérez / (Spain) S. Ruiz	2	6	1
14	(Spain) M. Villalba / (Spain) N. Rodríguez	6	2	6
C	(Spain) A.F. De Ossó / (Spain) L. Rodríguez	6	6
16	(Spain) A. Alonso / (France) A. Collombon	4	2
9	(Italy) C. Orsi / (Spain) P. Llaguno	7	6	6
7	(Spain) Majo / (Spain) Mapi	5	7	3
8	(Argentina) C. Jensen / (Spain) J. Castelló	6	6
21	(Spain) M. Martínez / (Spain) T. Navarro	1	4
20	(Spain) A. Martínez / (Spain) N. Cánovas	4	5
13	(Spain) C. Goenaga / (Spain) M. Caparrós	6	7
D	(Italy) C. Casali / (Spain) M. Borrero	4	2
15	(Sweden) C. Navarro / (Spain) M. Guinart	6	6
Bye
4	(Spain) B. González / (Argentina) D. Brea
3	(Spain) M. Ortega / (Portugal) S.Araújo
Bye
17	(Spain) L. Martínez / (Spain) M. Barrera	6	6
22	(Spain) A. Soriano / (Spain) S. Bellver	4	4
10	(Spain) L. Rufo / (Spain) M. Talaván	6	6
B	(Spain) A. Cañellas / (Spain) N. Aguilar	2	4
11	(Spain) C. Mesa / (Spain) E. Carnicero	3	5
6	(Spain) T. Icardo / (Argentina) V. Riera	6	7
5	(Argentina) A. Osoro / (Spain) L. Sainz	6	6
WC	(Denmark) G. Haxen / (Denmark) M. Rasmussen	0	2
12	(Spain) C. Fernández / (Argentina) J. Bidahorria	6	7
18	(Portugal) A.C. Nogueira / (Spain) M. Merino	3	6
23	(Italy) G. Sussarello / (France) L. Godallier	7	6
19	(Spain) E. Amatriaín / (Spain) S. Saiz	6	1
Bye
2	(Spain) A. Sánchez / (Spain) P. Josemaría

Round of 16
1	(Spain) A. Sánchez / (Spain) P. Josemaría	6	6
14	(Spain) M. Villalba / (Spain) N. Rodríguez	1	1
C	(Spain) A.F. De Ossó / (Spain) L. Rodríguez	4	3
9	(Italy) C. Orsi / (Spain) P. Llaguno	6	6
8	(Argentina) C. Jensen / (Spain) J. Castelló	6	6
13	(Spain) C. Goenaga / (Spain) M. Caparrós	2	1
15	(Sweden) C. Navarro / (Spain) M. Guinart	6	6
4	(Spain) B. González / (Argentina) D. Brea	0	3
4	(Spain) M. Ortega / (Portugal) S. Araújo	*
17	(Spain) L. Martínez / (Spain) M. Barrera
10	(Spain) L. Rufo / (Spain) M. Talaván	2	2
6	(Spain) T. Icardo / (Argentina) V. Riera	6	6
5	(Argentina) A. Osoro / (Spain) L. Sainz	1	2
12	(Spain) C. Fernández / (Argentina) J. Bidahorria	6	6
23	(Italy) G. Sussarello / (France) L. Godallier	2	4
2	(Spain) A. Salazar / (Spain) G. Triay	6	6

Quarter-Final
1	(Spain) A. Sánchez / (Spain) P. Josemaría	6	6
9	(Italy) C. Orsi / (Spain) P. Llaguno	2	4
8	(Argentina) C. Jensen / (Spain) J. Castelló	5	1
4	(Spain) B. González / (Argentina) D. Brea	7	6
4	(Spain) M. Ortega / (Portugal) S. Araújo	2	7	5
6	(Spain) T. Icardo / (Argentina) V. Riera	6	6	7
12	(Spain) C. Fernández / (Argentina) J. Bidahorria	5	2
2	(Spain) A. Salazar / (Spain) G. Triay	7	6

Semi-Finals
1	(Spain) A. Sánchez / (Spain) P. Josemaría	5	6
4	(Spain) B. González / (Argentina) D. Brea	7	7
6	(Spain) T. Icardo / (Argentina) V. Riera	6	6	2
2	(Spain) A. Salazar / (Spain) G. Triay	3	7	6

Finals
4	(Spain) B. González / (Argentina) D. Brea	6	3	6
2	(Spain) A. Salazar / (Spain) G. Triay	2	6	4

=== Final qualifying round ===
Men's

Data	Qualified	WPT Ranking Point	Opponents	Result
A	(Spain) Borja Yribarren (Spain) Cristóbal García	1.211 vs 432	(Spain) Javier Rodríguez (Spain) Roberto Belmont	6–0 / 6–3
B	(Argentina) Aris Patiniotis (Spain) Emilio Sanchéz Chamero	492 vs 819	(Spain) Alonso Rodríguez (Spain) Pablo Castillo	6–2 / 6–3
C	(Spain) Cándido Jorge Alfaro (Italy) Enzo Jensen	781 vs 881	(Spain) Mario Huete (Spain) Víctor Manuel Mena	7–5 / 7–5
D	(Spain) Arnau Ayats (Spain) Francisco Guerrero	1.636 vs 293	(Spain) Francisco Jurado (Spain) Guillermo Collado	6–3 / 6–2

Women's

Data	Qualified	WPT Ranking Point	Opponents	Result
A	(Spain) Águeda Pérez (Spain) Sara Ruiz	2.361 vs 1.480	(Spain) Raquel Segura (Spain) Lourdes Pascual	6–4 / 7–6
B	(Spain) Ariadna Cañellas (Spain) Noemí Aguilar	791 vs 937	(Spain) Julia Polo (Spain) Marta Arellano	6–2 / 6–7 / 7–5
C	(Spain) Ana Fernandez De Ossó (Spain) Laia Rodríguez	1.687 vs 1.629	(Spain) Martina Fassio (Spain) Sandra Hernández	7–6 / 3–6 / 6–3
D	(Italy) Carlotta Casali (Spain) Marta Borrero	1.430 vs 2.142	(Spain) Jimena Velasco (Spain) Sara Pujals	7–5 / 4–6 / 7–6

=== Round of 32 ===
Men's

Date	Team A	Score	Team B	Refs.
16/5/2023	(Argentina) Miguel Lamperti (Spain) Jaime Muñoz	3–6 / 6–4 / 3–6	(Spain) Marc Quílez (Argentina) Valentino Libaak	
16/5/2023	(Spain) Cándido Jorge Alfaro (Italy) Enzo Jensen	0–6 / 0–6	(Spain) Javier García Mora (Spain) Javier González Barahona	
16/5/2023	(Brazil) Lucas Bergamini (Spain) Víctor Ruiz	6–3 / 7–5	(Argentina) Agustín Gomez Silingo (Argentina) Juan Martín Díaz	
16/5/2023	(Spain) Arnau Ayats (Spain) Francisco Guerrero	6–1 / 6–3	(Spain) Ignacio Vilariño (Spain) Toni Bueno	
16/5/2023	(Spain) Alejandro Arroyo (Argentina) Lucho Capra	7–6 / 6–2	(Spain) Borja Yribarren (Spain) Cristóbal García	
16/5/2023	(Spain) Francisco Gil (Argentina) Ramiro Moyano	7–5 / 7–6	(Spain) Josete Rico (Spain) Salvador Oria	
17/5/2023	(Spain) Javier Martínez (Spain) Rafael Méndez	4–6 / 6–7	(Spain) José García Diestro (Spain) Pincho Fernández	
17/5/2023	(Spain) Momo González (Argentina) Sanyo Gutiérrez	6–3 / 6–1	(Argentina) Aris Patiniotis (Spain) Emilio S. Chamero	
17/5/2023	(Spain) Javi Garrido (Spain) Jon Sanz	WO (*inj.)	(Argentina) Agustín Tapia (Spain) Arturo Coello*	
17/5/2023	(Argentina) Leo Augsburger (Spain) Javi Rico	0–6 / 3–6	(Argentina) Federico Chingotto (Spain) Paquito Navarro	
17/5/2023	(Denmark) Esben Hess-Olesen (Denmark) Nils Skajaa	3–6 / 0–6	(Spain) Antón Sans (Spain) Teodoro Zapata	
17/5/2023	(Argentina) Agustín Gutiérrez (Spain) Álvaro Cepero	1–6 / 6–7	(Argentina) Franco Stupaczuk (Argentina) Martín Di Nenno	
17/5/2023	(Spain) Alex Ruiz (Argentina) Juan Tello	6–1 / 6–4	(Spain) Eduardo Alonso (Spain) Juanlu Esbri	
17/5/2023	(Argentina) Fernando Belasteguín (Spain) Miguel Yanguas	7–5 / 7–5	(Spain) Iván Ramírez (Spain) Pablo Cardona	
17/5/2023	(Spain) Alejandro Galán (Spain) Juan Lebrón	6–0 / 6–0	(Denmark) Emil Domela Hansen (Denmark) Marc Andreas Moller	
17/5/2023	(Spain) Javier Leal (Argentina) Juan Cruz Belluati	3–6 / 6–4 / 1–6	(Brazil) Lucas Campagnolo (Argentina) Maxi Sánchez	

Women's

Date	Team A	Score	Team B	Refs.
17/5/2023	(Italy) Carolina Orsi (Spain) Patty Llaguno	7–5 / 6–7 / 6–3	(Spain) Majo Sánchez Alayeto (Spain) Mapi Sánchez Alayeto	
17/5/2023	(Argentina) Claudia Jensen (Spain) Jessica Castelló	6–1 / 6–4	(Spain) Marina Martínez (Spain) Teresa Navarro	
17/5/2023	(Italy) Giulia Sussarello (France) Léa Godallier	7–6 / 6–1	(Spain) Eli Amatriaín (Spain) Sofía Saiz	
17/5/2023	(Spain) Águeda Pérez (Spain) Sara Ruiz	2–6 / 6–2 / 1–6	(Spain) Mª Carmen Villalba (Spain) Nuria Rodríguez	
17/5/2023	(Spain) Carla Mesa (Spain) Esther Carnicero	3–6 / 5–7	(Spain) Tamara Icardo (Argentina) Virginia Riera	
17/5/2023	(Spain) Ana Fernandez De Ossó (Spain) Laia Rodríguez	6–4 / 6–2	(Spain) Alejandra Alonso (France) Alix Collombon	
17/5/2023	(Italy) Carlotta Casali (Spain) Marta Borrero	4–6 / 2–6	(Sweden) Carolina Navarro (Spain) Marina Guinart	
17/5/2023	(Spain) Araceli Martínez (Spain) Noa Cánovas	4–6 / 5–7	(Spain) Carmen Goenaga (Spain) Marta Caparrós	
17/5/2023	(Argentina) Aranza Osoro (Spain) Lucía Sainz	6–0 / 6–2	(Denmark) Gitte Haxen (Denmark) Maria Rasmussen	
17/5/2023	(Spain) Claudia Fernández (Argentina) Julieta Bidahorria	6–3 / 7–6	(Portugal) Ana Catarina Nogueira (Spain) Melania Merino	
17/5/2023	(Spain) Lucía Martínez (Spain) Marta Barrera	6–4 / 6–4	(Spain) Arantxa Soriano (Spain) Sandra Bellver	
17/5/2023	(Spain) Lorena Rufo (Spain) Marta Talaván	6–2 / 6–4	(Spain) Ariadna Cañellas (Spain) Noemí Aguilar	

=== Round of 16 ===
Men's

Date	Team A	Score	Team B	Refs.
18/5/2023	(Spain) Marc Quílez (Argentina) Valentino Libaak	3–6 / 2–6	(Spain) Javi Garrido (Spain) Jon Sanz	
18/5/2023	(Spain) José García Diestro (Spain) Pincho Fernández	1–6 / 1–6	(Argentina) Federico Chingotto (Spain) Paquito Navarro	
18/5/2023	(Spain) Momo González (Argentina) Sanyo Gutiérrez	6–4 / 6–1	(Spain) Arnau Ayats (Spain) Francisco Guerrero	
18/5/2023	(Argentina) Fernando Belasteguín (Spain) Miguel Yanguas	2–6 / 6–1 / 6–4	(Brazil) Lucas Bergamini (Spain) Víctor Ruiz	
18/5/2023	(Spain) Francisco Gil (Argentina) Ramiro Moyano	3–6 / 5–7	(Argentina) Franco Stupaczuk (Argentina) Martín Di Nenno	
18/5/2023	(Spain) Alex Ruiz (Argentina) Juan Tello	6–2 / 4–6 / 6–0	(Spain) Antón Sans (Spain) Teodoro Zapata	
18/5/2023	(Spain) Javier García Mora (Spain) Javier González Barahona	3–6 / 2–6	(Brazil) Lucas Campagnolo (Argentina) Maxi Sánchez	
18/5/2023	(Spain) Alejandro Galán (Spain) Juan Lebrón*	W.O. (*inj.)	(Spain) Alejandro Arroyo (Argentina) Lucho Capra	

Women's

Date	Team A	Score	Team B	Refs.
18/5/2023	(Spain) Ariana Sánchez (Spain) Paula Josemaría	6–1 / 6–1	(Spain) Mª Carmen Villalba (Spain) Nuria Rodríguez	
18/5/2023	(Sweden) Carolina Navarro (Spain) Marina Guinart	0–6 / 3–6	(Spain) Bea González (Argentina) Delfina Brea	
18/5/2023	(Spain) Laia Rodríguez (Spain) Ana Fdez. De Ossó	4–6 / 3–6	(Italy) Carolina Orsi (Spain) Patty Llaguno	
18/5/2023	(Italy) Giulia Sussarello (France) Léa Godallier	2–6 / 4–6	(Spain) Alejandra Salazar (Spain) Gemma Triay	
18/5/2023	(Spain) Marta Ortega (Portugal) Sofia Araújo	W.O. (*inj.)	(Spain) Lucía Martínez (Spain) Marta Barrera	
18/5/2023	(Argentina) Claudia Jensen (Spain) Jessica Castelló	6–2 / 6–1	(Spain) Carmen Goenaga (Spain) Marta Caparrós	
18/5/2023	(Argentina) Aranza Osoro (Spain) Lucía Sainz	1–6 / 2–6	(Spain) Claudia Fernández (Argentina) Julieta Bidahorria	
18/5/2023	(Spain) Lorena Rufo (Spain) Marta Talaván	2–6 / 2–6	(Spain) Tamara Icardo (Argentina) Virginia Riera	

=== Quarter-Finals ===
Men's

Date	Team A	Score	Team B	Refs.
19/5/2023	(Spain) Momo González (Argentina) Sanyo Gutiérrez	7–5 / 3–6 / 6–4	(Argentina) Federico Chingotto (Spain) Paquito Navarro	
19/5/2023	(Argentina) Fernando Belasteguín (Spain) Miguel Yanguas	3–6 / 6–4 / 7–5	(Spain) Javi Garrido (Spain) Jon Sanz	
19/5/2023	(Spain) Alex Ruiz (Argentina) Juan Tello	1–6 / 5–7	(Argentina) Franco Stupaczuk (Argentina) Martín Di Nenno	
19/5/2023	(Spain) Alejandro Arroyo (Argentina) Lucho Capra	4–6 / 3–6	(Brazil) Lucas Campagnolo (Argentina) Maxi Sánchez	

Women's

Date	Team A	Score	Team B	Refs.
19/5/2023	(Spain) Ariana Sánchez (Spain) Paula Josemaría	6–2 / 6–4	(Italy) Carolina Orsi (Spain) Patty Llaguno	
19/5/2023	(Argentina) Claudia Jensen (Spain) Jessica Castelló	5–7 / 1–6	(Spain) Bea González (Argentina) Delfina Brea	
19/5/2023	(Spain) Claudia Fernández (Argentina) Julieta Bidahorria	5–7 / 2–6	(Spain) Alejandra Salazar (Spain) Gemma Triay	
19/5/2023	(Spain) Marta Ortega (Portugal) Sofia Araújo	2–6 / 7–6 / 5–7	(Spain) Tamara Icardo (Argentina) Virginia Riera	

=== Semi-Finals ===
Men's

Date	Team A	Score	Team B	Refs.
20/5/2023	(Spain) Momo González (Argentina) Sanyo Gutiérrez	6–4 / 4–6 / 6–3	(Argentina) Fernando Belasteguín (Spain) Miguel Yanguas	
20/5/2023	(Brazil) Lucas Campagnolo (Argentina) Maxi Sánchez	5–7 / 2–6	(Argentina) Franco Stupaczuk (Argentina) Martín Di Nenno	

Women's

Date	Team A	Score	Team B	Refs.
20/5/2023	(Spain) Ariana Sánchez (Spain) Paula Josemaría	5–7 / 6–7	(Spain) Bea González (Argentina) Delfina Brea	
20/5/2023	(Spain) Tamara Icardo (Argentina) Virginia Riera	6–3 / 6–7 / 2–6	(Spain) Alejandra Salazar (Spain) Gemma Triay	

=== Finals ===
Men's

Date	Team A	Score	Team B	Refs.
21/5/2023	(Argentina) Franco Stupaczuk (Argentina) Martín Di Nenno	6–3 / 6–2	(Spain) Momo González (Argentina) Sanyo Gutiérrez	

Women's

Date	Team A	Score	Team B	Refs.
21/5/2023	(Spain) Bea González (Argentina) Delfina Brea	6–2 / 3–6 / 6–4	(Spain) Alejandra Salazar (Spain) Gemma Triay	
