= Emily Stellato =

Italian tennis player

- Country (sports): Italy
- Born: 31 May 1982 (age 43); Latina, Italy
- Plays: Right-handed
- Prize money: $39,418

Singles
- Career record: 98–101
- Career titles: 2 ITF
- Highest ranking: No. 364 (8 November 2004)

Doubles
- Career record: 71–49
- Career titles: 1 WTA / 7 ITF
- Highest ranking: No. 162 (5 July 2004)

Emily Stellato (born 31 May 1982) is an Italian former professional tennis player and professional padel player.

A right-handed player from Latina, Stellato reached a best singles ranking of 364 on the professional tour and won two ITF titles.

Stellato was ranked as high as 162 in doubles and won a WTA Tour title at Palermo in 2003, partnering Adriana Serra Zanetti. She won a further seven ITF doubles tournaments, all in partnership with Alice Canepa.

== WTA Tour finals ==
=== Doubles (1-0) ===
Result	Date	Tournament	Tier	Surface	Partner	Opponents	Score
Win	Jul 2003	Palermo, Italy	Tier V	Clay	(Italy) Adriana Serra Zanetti	(Spain) María José Martínez Sánchez (Spain) Arantxa Parra Santonja	6–4, 6–2

== ITF finals ==
$50,000 tournaments
$25,000 tournaments
$10,000 tournaments

=== Singles: 5 (2–3) ===
Result	No.	Date	Tournament	Surface	Opponent	Score
Loss	1.	2 September 2002	Chieti, Italy	Clay	(Croatia) Sanda Mamić	3–6, 0–6
Win	1.	11 May 2003	Lecce, Italy	Clay	(Romania) Oana Elena Golimbioschi	4–6, 6–1, 6–3
Loss	2.	28 September 2004	Benevento, Italy	Hard	(Italy) Giulia Meruzzi	3–6, 4–6
Win	2.	31 October 2004	Quartu Sant'Elena, Italy	Clay	(Italy) Anna Floris	2–6, 6–3, 6–4
Loss	3.	19 September 2005	Ciampino, Italy	Clay	(Slovakia) Jana Juricová	2–6, 2–6

=== Doubles: 12 (7–5) ===
Result	No.	Date	Tournament	Surface	Partner	Opponents	Score
Win	1.	1 September 2002	Spoleto, Italy	Clay	(Italy) Alice Canepa	(Austria) Stefanie Haidner (Italy) Silvia Disderi	6–2, 6–2
Win	2.	30 September 2002	Ciampino, Italy	Clay	(Italy) Alice Canepa	(Romania) Oana Elena Golimbioschi (Hungary) Eszter Molnár	6–1, 4–6, 6–2
Loss	1.	20 October 2002	Benevento, Italy	Hard	(Italy) Stefania Chieppa	(Poland) Alicja Rosolska (Italy) Alexia Virgili	4–6, 4–6
Win	3.	29 March 2003	Parioli, Italy	Clay	(Italy) Alice Canepa	(Italy) Giulia Meruzzi (Italy) Silvia Disderi	6–3, 6–1
Loss	2.	25 August 2003	Rimini, Italy	Clay	(Italy) Alice Canepa	(Bosnia and Herzegovina) Mervana Jugić-Salkić (Croatia) Darija Jurak	6–7^{(3–7)}, 7–6^{(9–7)}, 5–7
Win	4.	8 March 2004	Rome 1, Italy	Clay	(Italy) Alice Canepa	(Austria) Daniela Klemenschits (Austria) Sandra Klemenschits	6–3, 2–6, 6–4
Win	5.	15 March 2004	Rome 2, Italy	Clay	(Italy) Alice Canepa	(Czech Republic) Zuzana Hejdová (Slovakia) Lenka Tvarošková	4–6, 6–1, 7–5
Win	6.	28 March 2004	Parioli, Italy	Clay	(Italy) Alice Canepa	(Italy) Giulia Meruzzi (Italy) Elisa Balsamo	7–6^{(0)}, 6–3
Win	7.	4 April 2005	Rome, Italy	Clay	(Italy) Alice Canepa	(Germany) Adriana Barna (Romania) Andreea Ehritt-Vanc	6–4, 6–0
Loss	3.	11 September 2005	Mestre, Italy	Clay	(Italy) Elisa Balsamo	(Hungary) Rita Kuti-Kis (Hungary) Kira Nagy	5–7, 4–6
Loss	4.	18 September 2006	Ciampino, Italy	Clay	(Italy) Denise Mascherini	(Germany) Elisa Peth (Italy) Astrid Besser	4–6, 2–6
Loss	5.	5 April 2009	Latina, Italy	Clay	(Russia) Marina Shamayko	(Italy) Alberta Brianti (Germany) Julia Schruff	1–6, 4–6
