= 1995 WTA Tour =

Women's tennis circuit

Details
- Duration: 2 January – 13 November 1995
- Edition: 25th
- Tournaments: 51
- Categories: Grand Slam (4); WTA Championships; WTA Tier I (8); WTA Tier II (17); WTA Tier III (11); WTA Tier IV (10)

Achievements (singles)
- Most titles: (Germany) Steffi Graf (9)
- Most finals: (Germany) Steffi Graf (9)
- Prize money leader: (Germany) Steffi Graf ($2,538,620)
- Points leader: (Germany) Steffi Graf (393.25)

Awards
- Player of the year: (Germany) Steffi Graf
- Doubles team of the year: (United States) Gigi Fernández; (Belarus) Natasha Zvereva
- Most improved player of the year: (United States) Chanda Rubin
- Newcomer of the year: (Switzerland) Martina Hingis
- Comeback player of the year: (United States) Monica Seles

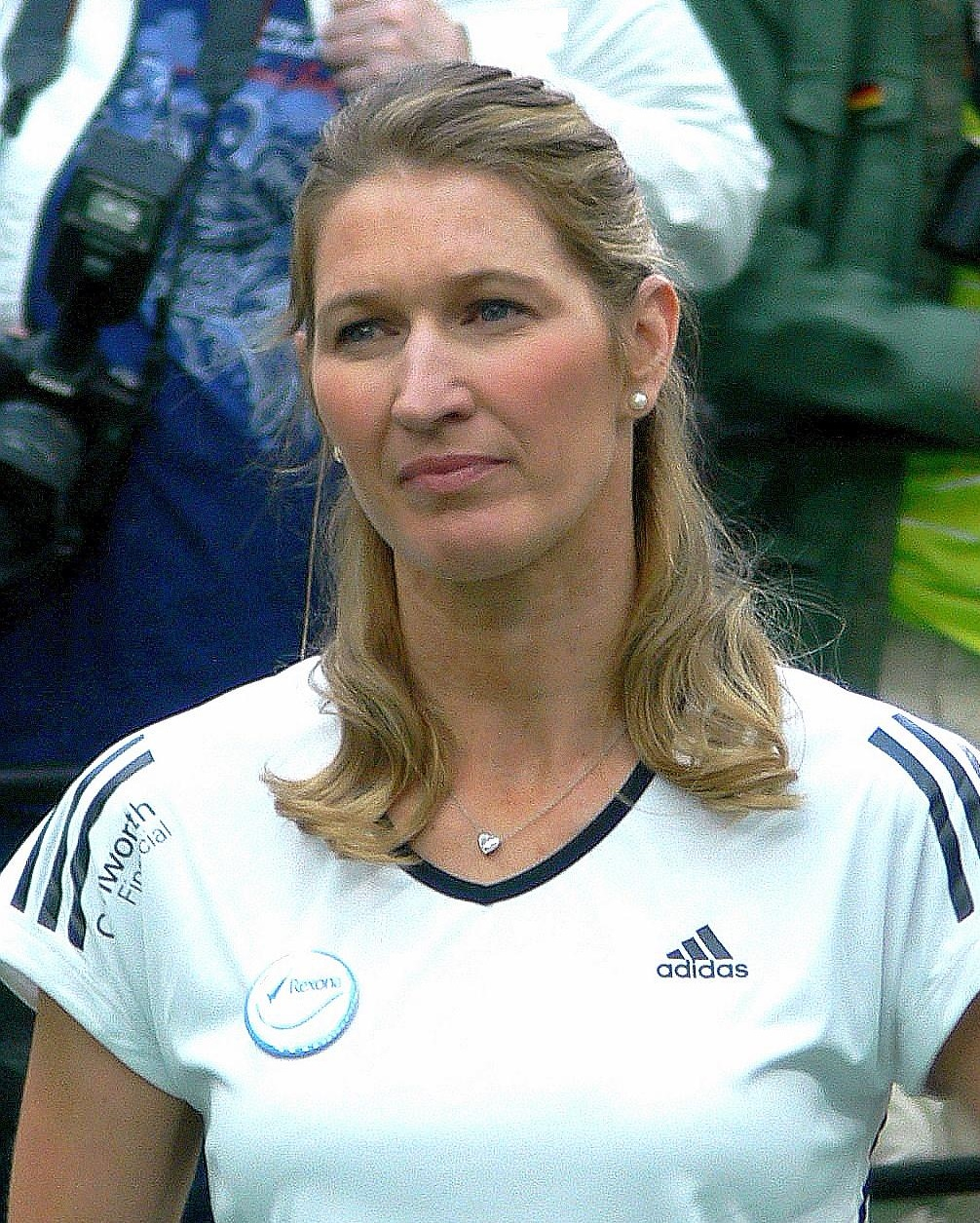
Steffi Graf finished the year as world No. 1 for the record-equaling seventh time in her career, tying Martina Navratilova's achievement. She won nine tournaments during the season, including three majors at the French Open, the Wimbledon Championships, and the US Open, as well as the WTA Tour Championships. She also won two Tier I events.

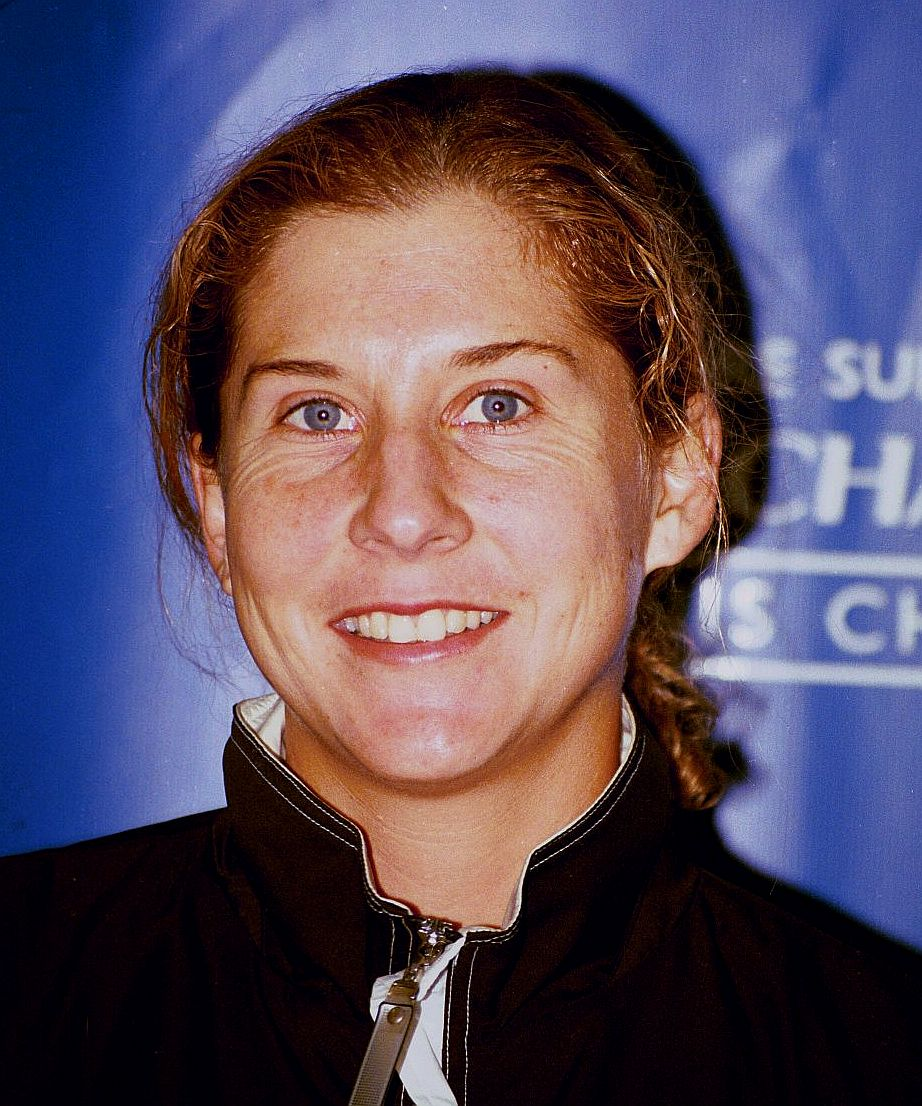
Monica Seles also finished the year as world No. 1 for the third time in her career, being granted the ranking on a protected status as part of her return from her 1993 stabbing. She won one tournament during the season, a Tier I event, and finished runner-up at a major at the US Open.

The WTA Tour is the elite tour for professional women's tennis organised by the Women's Tennis Association (WTA). The WTA Tour includes the four Grand Slam tournaments, the WTA Tour Championships and the WTA Tier I, Tier II, Tier III and Tier IV events. ITF tournaments are not part of the WTA Tour, although they award points for the WTA World Ranking.

== Schedule ==
The table below shows the 1995 WTA Tour schedule.

Key

Grand Slam events
Year-end championships
Tier I
Tier II
Tier III
Tier IV
Team events

=== January ===
Week	Tournament	Champions	Runners-up	Semifinalists	Quarterfinalists
2 Jan	Hyundai Hopman Cup; Perth, Australia; ITF Mixed Teams Championships; Hard (i) – A$1,000,000 – 12 teams	Germany; 3–0	Ukraine	Czech Republic; France	Australia; United States; Spain; Austria
2 Jan	Danamon Indonesia Open; Jakarta, Indonesia; Tier III; Hard – $161,250 – 56S/28D; Singles – Doubles	(Germany) Sabine Hack; 2–6, 7–6^{(8–6)}, 6–4	(Romania) Irina Spîrlea	(Sweden) Maria Strandlund (Indonesia) Yayuk Basuki	(Canada) Jana Nejedly (Chinese Taipei) Wang Shi-ting (Slovenia) Tina Križan (Japan) Nana Miyagi
2 Jan	Danamon Indonesia Open; Jakarta, Indonesia; Tier III; Hard – $161,250 – 56S/28D; Singles – Doubles	(Germany) Claudia Porwik (Romania) Irina Spîrlea; 6–2, 6–3	(Belgium) Laurence Courtois (Belgium) Nancy Feber	(Sweden) Maria Strandlund (Indonesia) Yayuk Basuki	(Canada) Jana Nejedly (Chinese Taipei) Wang Shi-ting (Slovenia) Tina Križan (Japan) Nana Miyagi
9 Jan	Schweppes Tasmanian International; Hobart, Australia; Tier IV; Hard – $107,500 – 32S/16D; Singles – Doubles	(Georgia (country)) Leila Meskhi; 6–2, 6–3	(China) Fang Li	(Austria) Judith Wiesner (Japan) Yone Kamio	(United States) Jolene Watanabe (Germany) Meike Babel (United States) Tami Whitlinger Jones (Kazakhstan) Elena Likhovtseva
9 Jan	Schweppes Tasmanian International; Hobart, Australia; Tier IV; Hard – $107,500 – 32S/16D; Singles – Doubles	(Japan) Kyōko Nagatsuka (Japan) Ai Sugiyama; 2–6, 6–4, 6–2	(Netherlands) Manon Bollegraf (Latvia) Larisa Savchenko	(Austria) Judith Wiesner (Japan) Yone Kamio	(United States) Jolene Watanabe (Germany) Meike Babel (United States) Tami Whitlinger Jones (Kazakhstan) Elena Likhovtseva
9 Jan	Peters International; Sydney, Australia; Tier II; Hard – $322,500 – 28S/16D; Singles – Doubles	(Argentina) Gabriela Sabatini; 6–3, 6–4	(United States) Lindsay Davenport	(Japan) Kimiko Date (United States) Mary Joe Fernández	(Czech Republic) Ludmila Richterová (Netherlands) Miriam Oremans (Australia) Nicole Bradtke (United States) Patty Fendick
9 Jan	Peters International; Sydney, Australia; Tier II; Hard – $322,500 – 28S/16D; Singles – Doubles	(United States) Lindsay Davenport (Czech Republic) Jana Novotná; 7–5, 2–6, 6–4	(United States) Patty Fendick (United States) Mary Joe Fernández	(Japan) Kimiko Date (United States) Mary Joe Fernández	(Czech Republic) Ludmila Richterová (Netherlands) Miriam Oremans (Australia) Nicole Bradtke (United States) Patty Fendick
16 Jan; 23 Jan	Australian Open; Melbourne, Australia; Grand Slam; Hard – $2,338,825 – 128S/64Q/64D/32X; Singles – Doubles – Mixed doubles	(France) Mary Pierce; 6–3, 6–2	(Spain) Arantxa Sánchez Vicario	(United States) Marianne Werdel-Witmeyer (Spain) Conchita Martínez	(Japan) Naoko Sawamatsu (Mexico) Angélica Gavaldón (Belarus) Natalia Zvereva (United States) Lindsay Davenport
16 Jan; 23 Jan	Australian Open; Melbourne, Australia; Grand Slam; Hard – $2,338,825 – 128S/64Q/64D/32X; Singles – Doubles – Mixed doubles	(Czech Republic) Jana Novotná (Spain) Arantxa Sánchez Vicario; 6–3, 6–7^{(3–7)}, 6–4	(United States) Gigi Fernández (Belarus) Natalia Zvereva	(United States) Marianne Werdel-Witmeyer (Spain) Conchita Martínez	(Japan) Naoko Sawamatsu (Mexico) Angélica Gavaldón (Belarus) Natalia Zvereva (United States) Lindsay Davenport
16 Jan; 23 Jan	Australian Open; Melbourne, Australia; Grand Slam; Hard – $2,338,825 – 128S/64Q/64D/32X; Singles – Doubles – Mixed doubles	(Belarus) Natasha Zvereva (United States) Rick Leach; 7–6^{(7–4)}, 6–7^{(3–7)}, 6–4	(United States) Gigi Fernández (Czech Republic) Cyril Suk	(United States) Marianne Werdel-Witmeyer (Spain) Conchita Martínez	(Japan) Naoko Sawamatsu (Mexico) Angélica Gavaldón (Belarus) Natalia Zvereva (United States) Lindsay Davenport
30 Jan	Amway Classic; Auckland, New Zealand; Tier IV; Hard – $107,500 – 32S/16D; Singles – Doubles	(Australia) Nicole Bradtke; 3–6, 6–2, 6–1	(United States) Ginger Helgeson-Nielsen	(Italy) Silvia Farina (Ukraine) Natalia Medvedeva	(France) Julie Halard (Netherlands) Kim de Weille (Australia) Rachel McQuillan (China) Fang Li
30 Jan	Amway Classic; Auckland, New Zealand; Tier IV; Hard – $107,500 – 32S/16D; Singles – Doubles	(Canada) Jill Hetherington (South Africa) Elna Reinach; 7–6^{(7–5)}, 6–2	(Italy) Laura Golarsa (Netherlands) Caroline Vis	(Italy) Silvia Farina (Ukraine) Natalia Medvedeva	(France) Julie Halard (Netherlands) Kim de Weille (Australia) Rachel McQuillan (China) Fang Li
30 Jan	Toray Pan Pacific Open; Tokyo, Japan; Tier I Carpet (i) – $806,250 – 28S/16D; Singles – Doubles	(Japan) Kimiko Date; 6–1, 6–2	(United States) Lindsay Davenport	(Croatia) Iva Majoli (Bulgaria) Magdalena Maleeva	(Spain) Conchita Martínez (Japan) Naoko Sawamatsu (Germany) Anke Huber (France) Mary Pierce
30 Jan	Toray Pan Pacific Open; Tokyo, Japan; Tier I Carpet (i) – $806,250 – 28S/16D; Singles – Doubles	(United States) Gigi Fernández (Belarus) Natalia Zvereva; 6–0, 6–3	(United States) Lindsay Davenport (Australia) Rennae Stubbs	(Croatia) Iva Majoli (Bulgaria) Magdalena Maleeva	(Spain) Conchita Martínez (Japan) Naoko Sawamatsu (Germany) Anke Huber (France) Mary Pierce

=== February ===
Week	Tournament	Champions	Runners-up	Semifinalists	Quarterfinalists
6 Feb	Ameritech Cup; Chicago, United States; Tier II; Carpet (i) – $430,000 – 28S/16D; Singles – Doubles	(Bulgaria) Magdalena Maleeva; 7–5, 7–6	(United States) Lisa Raymond	(United States) Zina Garrison-Jackson (Argentina) Gabriela Sabatini	(United States) Amy Frazier (Netherlands) Brenda Schultz (Belgium) Laurence Courtois (United States) Chanda Rubin
6 Feb	Ameritech Cup; Chicago, United States; Tier II; Carpet (i) – $430,000 – 28S/16D; Singles – Doubles	(Argentina) Gabriela Sabatini (Netherlands) Brenda Schultz; 5–7, 7–6, 6–4	(United States) Tami Whitlinger Jones (United States) Marianne Werdel	(United States) Zina Garrison-Jackson (Argentina) Gabriela Sabatini	(United States) Amy Frazier (Netherlands) Brenda Schultz (Belgium) Laurence Courtois (United States) Chanda Rubin
13 Feb	IGA Classic; Oklahoma City, United States; Tier III; Hard (i) – $161,250 – 32S/16D; Singles – Doubles	(Netherlands) Brenda Schultz; 6–1, 6–2	(Kazakhstan) Elena Likhovtseva	(United States) Patty Fendick (United States) Amy Frazier	(United States) Audra Keller (United States) Laxmi Poruri (United States) Lisa Raymond (United States) Tami Whitlinger Jones
13 Feb	IGA Classic; Oklahoma City, United States; Tier III; Hard (i) – $161,250 – 32S/16D; Singles – Doubles	(United States) Nicole Arendt (Italy) Laura Golarsa; 6–4, 6–3	(United States) Katrina Adams (Netherlands) Brenda Schultz	(United States) Patty Fendick (United States) Amy Frazier	(United States) Audra Keller (United States) Laxmi Poruri (United States) Lisa Raymond (United States) Tami Whitlinger Jones
13 Feb	Open Gaz de France; Paris, France; Tier II; Hard (i) – $430,000 – 28S/16D; Singles – Doubles	(Germany) Steffi Graf; 6–2, 6–2	(France) Mary Pierce	(Czech Republic) Jana Novotná (Croatia) Iva Majoli	(Switzerland) Martina Hingis (Slovakia) Karina Habšudová (Belgium) Sabine Appelmans (Austria) Judith Wiesner
13 Feb	Open Gaz de France; Paris, France; Tier II; Hard (i) – $430,000 – 28S/16D; Singles – Doubles	(United States) Meredith McGrath (Latvia) Larisa Savchenko; 6–4, 6–1	(Netherlands) Manon Bollegraf (Australia) Rennae Stubbs	(Czech Republic) Jana Novotná (Croatia) Iva Majoli	(Switzerland) Martina Hingis (Slovakia) Karina Habšudová (Belgium) Sabine Appelmans (Austria) Judith Wiesner
20 Feb	EA-Generali Ladies Linz; Linz, Austria; Tier III; Carpet (i) – $161,250 – 32S/16D; Singles – Doubles	(Czech Republic) Jana Novotná; 6–7, 6–3, 6–4	(Germany) Barbara Rittner	(Germany) Meike Babel (Austria) Beate Reinstadler	(Austria) Petra Schwarz (Italy) Anna-Maria Cecchini (Belgium) Sabine Appelmans (Finland) Nanne Dahlman
20 Feb	EA-Generali Ladies Linz; Linz, Austria; Tier III; Carpet (i) – $161,250 – 32S/16D; Singles – Doubles	(United States) Meredith McGrath (France) Nathalie Tauziat; 6–1, 6–2	(Croatia) Iva Majoli (Austria) Petra Schwarz	(Germany) Meike Babel (Austria) Beate Reinstadler	(Austria) Petra Schwarz (Italy) Anna-Maria Cecchini (Belgium) Sabine Appelmans (Finland) Nanne Dahlman
27 Feb	State Farm Evert Cup; Indian Wells, United States; Tier II; Hard – $430,000 – 28S/16D; Singles – Doubles	(United States) Mary Joe Fernández; 6–4, 6–3	(Belarus) Natasha Zvereva	(Spain) Arantxa Sánchez Vicario (Japan) Naoko Sawamatsu	(United States) Chanda Rubin (Kazakhstan) Elena Likhovtseva (United States) Lindsay Davenport (Spain) Conchita Martínez
27 Feb	State Farm Evert Cup; Indian Wells, United States; Tier II; Hard – $430,000 – 28S/16D; Singles – Doubles	(United States) Lindsay Davenport (United States) Lisa Raymond; 2–6, 6–4, 6–3	(Latvia) Larisa Savchenko (Spain) Arantxa Sánchez Vicario	(Spain) Arantxa Sánchez Vicario (Japan) Naoko Sawamatsu	(United States) Chanda Rubin (Kazakhstan) Elena Likhovtseva (United States) Lindsay Davenport (Spain) Conchita Martínez
27 Feb	Puerto Rico Open; San Juan, Puerto Rico; Tier III; Hard – $161,250 – 32S/16D; Singles – Doubles	(South Africa) Joannette Kruger; 7–6, 6–3	(Japan) Kyōko Nagatsuka	(United States) Gigi Fernández (Argentina) Florencia Labat	(Belgium) Nancy Feber (Italy) Silvia Farina (France) Alexia Dechaume-Balleret (France) Sandrine Testud
27 Feb	Puerto Rico Open; San Juan, Puerto Rico; Tier III; Hard – $161,250 – 32S/16D; Singles – Doubles	(Germany) Karin Kschwendt (Canada) Rene Simpson; 6–2, 0–6, 6–4	(Italy) Laura Golarsa (United States) Linda Harvey-Wild	(United States) Gigi Fernández (Argentina) Florencia Labat	(Belgium) Nancy Feber (Italy) Silvia Farina (France) Alexia Dechaume-Balleret (France) Sandrine Testud

=== March ===
Week	Tournament	Champions	Runners-up	Semifinalists	Quarterfinalists
6 Mar	Delray Beach Winter Championships; Delray Beach, United States; Tier II; Hard – $430,000 – 56S/28D; Singles – Doubles	(Germany) Steffi Graf; 6–2, 6–4	(Spain) Conchita Martínez	(Germany) Anke Huber (Netherlands) Brenda Schultz	(Germany) Barbara Rittner (Kazakhstan) Elena Likhovtseva (Argentina) Florencia Labat (Netherlands) Kristie Boogert
6 Mar	Delray Beach Winter Championships; Delray Beach, United States; Tier II; Hard – $430,000 – 56S/28D; Singles – Doubles	(United States) Mary Joe Fernández (Czech Republic) Jana Novotná; 6–4, 6–0	(United States) Lori McNeil (Latvia) Larisa Savchenko	(Germany) Anke Huber (Netherlands) Brenda Schultz	(Germany) Barbara Rittner (Kazakhstan) Elena Likhovtseva (Argentina) Florencia Labat (Netherlands) Kristie Boogert
13 Mar; 20 Mar	Lipton Championships; Key Biscayne, United States; Tier I Hard – $1,550,000 – 96S/48D; Singles – Doubles	(Germany) Steffi Graf; 6–1, 6–4	(Japan) Kimiko Date	(Argentina) Gabriela Sabatini (Czech Republic) Jana Novotná	(United States) Marianne Werdel-Witmeyer (Australia) Rachel McQuillan (Germany) Anke Huber (Belarus) Natalia Zvereva
13 Mar; 20 Mar	Lipton Championships; Key Biscayne, United States; Tier I Hard – $1,550,000 – 96S/48D; Singles – Doubles	(Czech Republic) Jana Novotná (Spain) Arantxa Sánchez Vicario; 7–5, 2–6, 6–3	(United States) Gigi Fernández (Belarus) Natalia Zvereva	(Argentina) Gabriela Sabatini (Czech Republic) Jana Novotná	(United States) Marianne Werdel-Witmeyer (Australia) Rachel McQuillan (Germany) Anke Huber (Belarus) Natalia Zvereva
27 Mar	Family Circle Cup; Hilton Head Island, United States; Tier I Clay – $806,250 – 56S/28D; Singles – Doubles	(Spain) Conchita Martínez; 6–1, 6–1	(Bulgaria) Magdalena Maleeva	(Italy) Silvia Farina (Belarus) Natalia Zvereva	(Spain) Arantxa Sánchez Vicario (France) Lea Ghirardi (Latvia) Larisa Savchenko (Croatia) Iva Majoli
27 Mar	Family Circle Cup; Hilton Head Island, United States; Tier I Clay – $806,250 – 56S/28D; Singles – Doubles	(United States) Nicole Arendt (Netherlands) Manon Bollegraf; 0–6, 6–3, 6–4	(United States) Gigi Fernández (Belarus) Natalia Zvereva	(Italy) Silvia Farina (Belarus) Natalia Zvereva	(Spain) Arantxa Sánchez Vicario (France) Lea Ghirardi (Latvia) Larisa Savchenko (Croatia) Iva Majoli

=== April ===
Week	Tournament	Champions	Runners-up	Semifinalists	Quarterfinalists
3 Apr	Bausch & Lomb Championships; Amelia Island, United States; Tier II; Clay – $430,000 – 56S/32Q/28D; Singles – Doubles	(Spain) Conchita Martínez; 6–1, 6–4	(Argentina) Gabriela Sabatini	(Bulgaria) Magdalena Maleeva (Germany) Sabine Hack	(South Africa) Amanda Coetzer (Belgium) Laurence Courtois (Poland) Katarzyna Nowak (Argentina) Inés Gorrochategui
3 Apr	Bausch & Lomb Championships; Amelia Island, United States; Tier II; Clay – $430,000 – 56S/32Q/28D; Singles – Doubles	(South Africa) Amanda Coetzer (Argentina) Inés Gorrochategui; 6–2, 3–6, 6–2	(United States) Nicole Arendt (Netherlands) Manon Bollegraf	(Bulgaria) Magdalena Maleeva (Germany) Sabine Hack	(South Africa) Amanda Coetzer (Belgium) Laurence Courtois (Poland) Katarzyna Nowak (Argentina) Inés Gorrochategui
10 Apr	Gallery Furniture Championships; Houston, United States; Tier II; Clay – $430,000 – 28S/16D; Singles – Doubles	(Germany) Steffi Graf; 6–1, 6–1	(Sweden) Åsa Carlsson	(Germany) Sabine Hack (Germany) Wiltrud Probst	(United States) Tami Whitlinger Jones (Georgia (country)) Nino Louarsabishvili (South Africa) Joannette Kruger (Italy) Anna-Maria Cecchini
10 Apr	Gallery Furniture Championships; Houston, United States; Tier II; Clay – $430,000 – 28S/16D; Singles – Doubles	(United States) Nicole Arendt (Netherlands) Manon Bollegraf; 6–4, 6–2	(Germany) Wiltrud Probst (Canada) Rene Simpson	(Germany) Sabine Hack (Germany) Wiltrud Probst	(United States) Tami Whitlinger Jones (Georgia (country)) Nino Louarsabishvili (South Africa) Joannette Kruger (Italy) Anna-Maria Cecchini
10 Apr	Japan Open Tennis Championships; Tokyo, Japan; Tier III; Hard – $161,250 – 32S/16D; Singles – Doubles	(United States) Amy Frazier; 7–6, 7–5	(Japan) Kimiko Date	(Japan) Nana Miyagi (Hong Kong) Tang Min	(Japan) Kyōko Nagatsuka (Italy) Rita Grande (Japan) Yone Kamio (United States) Patty Fendick
10 Apr	Japan Open Tennis Championships; Tokyo, Japan; Tier III; Hard – $161,250 – 32S/16D; Singles – Doubles	(Japan) Miho Saeki (Japan) Yuka Yoshida; 6–7, 6–4, 7–6	(Japan) Kyōko Nagatsuka (Japan) Ai Sugiyama	(Japan) Nana Miyagi (Hong Kong) Tang Min	(Japan) Kyōko Nagatsuka (Italy) Rita Grande (Japan) Yone Kamio (United States) Patty Fendick
17 Apr	Fed Cup first round Sofia, Bulgaria, Carpet (i); Freiburg, Germany, Clay; Metz, France, Clay; Aventura, Florida, U.S., Hard	First round winners Spain 3-2; Germany 4-1; France 3–2; United States 5-0	First round losers Bulgaria; Japan; South Africa; Austria		
24 April	Croatian Ladies Open; Zagreb, Croatia; Tier III; Clay – $161,250 – 32S/16D; Singles – Doubles	(Belgium) Sabine Appelmans; 6–4, 6–3	(Germany) Silke Meier	(Slovakia) Denisa Szabová (Romania) Irina Spîrlea	(Italy) Laura Golarsa (Germany) Marketa Kochta (Germany) Barbara Rittner (Japan) Ai Sugiyama
24 April	Croatian Ladies Open; Zagreb, Croatia; Tier III; Clay – $161,250 – 32S/16D; Singles – Doubles	(Argentina) Mercedes Paz (Canada) Rene Simpson; 7–5, 6–2	(Italy) Laura Golarsa (Romania) Irina Spîrlea	(Slovakia) Denisa Szabová (Romania) Irina Spîrlea	(Italy) Laura Golarsa (Germany) Marketa Kochta (Germany) Barbara Rittner (Japan) Ai Sugiyama
24 April	Spanish Open; Barcelona, Spain; Tier II; Clay – $430,000 – 28S/16D; Singles – Doubles	(Spain) Arantxa Sánchez Vicario; 5–7, 6–0, 6–2	(Croatia) Iva Majoli	(South Africa) Amanda Coetzer (Poland) Katarzyna Nowak	(United States) Ann Grossman (France) Nathalie Tauziat (Romania) Ruxandra Dragomir (Argentina) Inés Gorrochategui
24 April	Spanish Open; Barcelona, Spain; Tier II; Clay – $430,000 – 28S/16D; Singles – Doubles	(Latvia) Larisa Savchenko (Spain) Arantxa Sánchez Vicario; 7–5, 4–6, 7–5	(South Africa) Mariaan de Swardt (Croatia) Iva Majoli	(South Africa) Amanda Coetzer (Poland) Katarzyna Nowak	(United States) Ann Grossman (France) Nathalie Tauziat (Romania) Ruxandra Dragomir (Argentina) Inés Gorrochategui

=== May ===
Week	Tournament	Champions	Runners-up	Semifinalists	Quarterfinalists
1 May	Citizen Cup; Hamburg, Germany; Tier II; Clay – $430,000 – 28S/32Q/16D; Singles – Doubles	(Spain) Conchita Martínez; 6–1, 6–0	(Switzerland) Martina Hingis	(Germany) Anke Huber (Bulgaria) Magdalena Maleeva	(Germany) Petra Begerow (Austria) Judith Wiesner (Germany) Barbara Rittner (Germany) Jana Kandarr
1 May	Citizen Cup; Hamburg, Germany; Tier II; Clay – $430,000 – 28S/32Q/16D; Singles – Doubles	(United States) Gigi Fernández (Switzerland) Martina Hingis; 6–2, 6–3	(Spain) Conchita Martínez (Argentina) Patricia Tarabini	(Germany) Anke Huber (Bulgaria) Magdalena Maleeva	(Germany) Petra Begerow (Austria) Judith Wiesner (Germany) Barbara Rittner (Germany) Jana Kandarr
8 May	Prague Open; Prague, Czech Republic; Tier IV; Clay – $107,500 – 32S/16D; Singles – Doubles	(France) Julie Halard; 6–4, 6–4	(Czech Republic) Ludmila Richterová	(Slovakia) Katarína Studeníková (Netherlands) Stephanie Rottier	(Sweden) Åsa Carlsson (Czech Republic) Sandra Kleinová (Hungary) Andrea Temesvári (Austria) Barbara Schett
8 May	Prague Open; Prague, Czech Republic; Tier IV; Clay – $107,500 – 32S/16D; Singles – Doubles	(United States) Linda Harvey-Wild (United States) Chanda Rubin; 6–7, 6–3, 6–2	(Sweden) Maria Lindström (Sweden) Maria Strandlund	(Slovakia) Katarína Studeníková (Netherlands) Stephanie Rottier	(Sweden) Åsa Carlsson (Czech Republic) Sandra Kleinová (Hungary) Andrea Temesvári (Austria) Barbara Schett
8 May	Italian Open; Rome, Italy; Tier I Clay – $806,250 – 56S/32Q/28D; Singles – Doubles	(Spain) Conchita Martínez; 6–3, 6–1	(Spain) Arantxa Sánchez Vicario	(Czech Republic) Helena Suková (France) Mary Pierce	(United States) Shaun Stafford (South Africa) Joannette Kruger (United States) Mary Joe Fernández (Croatia) Iva Majoli
8 May	Italian Open; Rome, Italy; Tier I Clay – $806,250 – 56S/32Q/28D; Singles – Doubles	(United States) Gigi Fernández (Belarus) Natalia Zvereva; 3–6, 7–6, 6–4	(Spain) Conchita Martínez (Argentina) Patricia Tarabini	(Czech Republic) Helena Suková (France) Mary Pierce	(United States) Shaun Stafford (South Africa) Joannette Kruger (United States) Mary Joe Fernández (Croatia) Iva Majoli
15 May	WTA German Open; Berlin, Germany; Tier I Clay – $806,250 – 56S/28D; Singles – Doubles	(Spain) Arantxa Sánchez Vicario; 6–4, 6–1	(Bulgaria) Magdalena Maleeva	(Romania) Irina Spîrlea (Belarus) Natalia Zvereva	(Japan) Kimiko Date (Germany) Petra Begerow (Australia) Nicole Bradtke (France) Mary Pierce
15 May	WTA German Open; Berlin, Germany; Tier I Clay – $806,250 – 56S/28D; Singles – Doubles	(South Africa) Amanda Coetzer (Argentina) Inés Gorrochategui; 4–6, 7–6, 6–2	(Latvia) Larisa Savchenko (Argentina) Gabriela Sabatini	(Romania) Irina Spîrlea (Belarus) Natalia Zvereva	(Japan) Kimiko Date (Germany) Petra Begerow (Australia) Nicole Bradtke (France) Mary Pierce
15 May	Rover British Clay Court Championships; Bournemouth, Great Britain; Tier IV; Clay – $107,500 – 32S/16D; Singles – Doubles	(Czech Republic) Ludmila Richterová; 6–7, 6–4, 6–3	(Canada) Patricia Hy-Boulais	(United States) Lindsay Lee (Sweden) Åsa Carlsson	(Czech Republic) Petra Langrová (Czech Republic) Radka Bobková (Belgium) Els Callens (United States) Chanda Rubin
15 May	Rover British Clay Court Championships; Bournemouth, Great Britain; Tier IV; Clay – $107,500 – 32S/16D; Singles – Doubles	(South Africa) Mariaan de Swardt (Romania) Ruxandra Dragomir; 6–3, 7–5	(Australia) Kerry-Anne Guse (Canada) Patricia Hy-Boulais	(United States) Lindsay Lee (Sweden) Åsa Carlsson	(Czech Republic) Petra Langrová (Czech Republic) Radka Bobková (Belgium) Els Callens (United States) Chanda Rubin
22 May	Internationaux de Strasbourg; Strasbourg, France; Tier III; Clay – $161,250 – 32S/16D; Singles – Doubles	(United States) Lindsay Davenport; 3–6, 6–1, 6–2	(Japan) Kimiko Date	(France) Sandrine Testud (Japan) Yone Kamio	(Austria) Judith Wiesner (Netherlands) Stephanie Rottier (Belgium) Sabine Appelmans (Netherlands) Miriam Oremans
22 May	Internationaux de Strasbourg; Strasbourg, France; Tier III; Clay – $161,250 – 32S/16D; Singles – Doubles	(United States) Lindsay Davenport (United States) Mary Joe Fernández; 6–2, 6–3	(Belgium) Sabine Appelmans (Netherlands) Miriam Oremans	(France) Sandrine Testud (Japan) Yone Kamio	(Austria) Judith Wiesner (Netherlands) Stephanie Rottier (Belgium) Sabine Appelmans (Netherlands) Miriam Oremans
22 May	World Doubles Cup; Edinburgh, Great Britain; Clay – $188,125 – 8D; Doubles	(United States) Meredith McGrath (Latvia) Larisa Neiland; 6–2, 7–6	(Netherlands) Manon Bollegraf (Australia) Rennae Stubbs	(United States) Adams / Garrison (United States) Fendick / (Canada) Hetherington	(Sweden) Lindström / (Sweden) Strandlund (United States) Graham / (United States) McGrath (United States) Arendt / (Italy) Golarsa (United Kingdom) Pullin / (United Kingdom) Woodroffe
29 May; 5 June	French Open; Paris, France; Grand Slam; Clay – $3,820,604 – 128S/64Q/64D/48X; Singles – Doubles – Mixed doubles	(Germany) Steffi Graf; 7–5, 4–6, 6–0	(Spain) Arantxa Sánchez Vicario	(Japan) Kimiko Date (Spain) Conchita Martínez	(United States) Chanda Rubin (Croatia) Iva Majoli (Spain) Virginia Ruano Pascual (Argentina) Gabriela Sabatini
29 May; 5 June	French Open; Paris, France; Grand Slam; Clay – $3,820,604 – 128S/64Q/64D/48X; Singles – Doubles – Mixed doubles	(United States) Gigi Fernández (Belarus) Natalia Zvereva; 6–7^{(6–8)}, 6–4, 7–5	(Czech Republic) Jana Novotná (Spain) Arantxa Sánchez Vicario	(Japan) Kimiko Date (Spain) Conchita Martínez	(United States) Chanda Rubin (Croatia) Iva Majoli (Spain) Virginia Ruano Pascual (Argentina) Gabriela Sabatini
29 May; 5 June	French Open; Paris, France; Grand Slam; Clay – $3,820,604 – 128S/64Q/64D/48X; Singles – Doubles – Mixed doubles	(Latvia) Larisa Savchenko-Neiland (Australia) Todd Woodbridge; 7–6(8), 7–6^{(7–4)}	(Canada) Jill Hetherington (South Africa) John-Laffnie de Jager	(Japan) Kimiko Date (Spain) Conchita Martínez	(United States) Chanda Rubin (Croatia) Iva Majoli (Spain) Virginia Ruano Pascual (Argentina) Gabriela Sabatini

=== June ===
Week	Tournament	Champions	Runners-up	Semifinalists	Quarterfinalists
12 June	DFS Classic; Birmingham, Great Britain; Tier III; Grass – $161,250 – 56S/28D; Singles – Doubles	(United States) Zina Garrison-Jackson; 6–3, 6–3	(United States) Lori McNeil	(South Africa) Elna Reinach (Belgium) Els Callens	(Belgium) Laurence Courtois (United States) Nicole Arendt (Germany) Christina Singer (Australia) Kristine Radford
12 June	DFS Classic; Birmingham, Great Britain; Tier III; Grass – $161,250 – 56S/28D; Singles – Doubles	(Netherlands) Manon Bollegraf (Australia) Rennae Stubbs; 3–6, 6–4, 6–4	(Australia) Nicole Bradtke (Australia) Kristine Radford	(South Africa) Elna Reinach (Belgium) Els Callens	(Belgium) Laurence Courtois (United States) Nicole Arendt (Germany) Christina Singer (Australia) Kristine Radford
19 June	Direct Line International Championships; Eastbourne, Great Britain; Tier II; Grass – $430,000 – 56S/28D; Singles – Doubles	(France) Nathalie Tauziat; 3–6, 6–0, 7–5	(United States) Chanda Rubin	(Germany) Christina Singer (Belarus) Natalia Zvereva	(Japan) Kimiko Date (Indonesia) Yayuk Basuki (United States) Lori McNeil (Argentina) Inés Gorrochategui
19 June	Direct Line International Championships; Eastbourne, Great Britain; Tier II; Grass – $430,000 – 56S/28D; Singles – Doubles	(Czech Republic) Jana Novotná (Spain) Arantxa Sánchez Vicario; 0–6, 6–3, 6–4	(United States) Gigi Fernández (Belarus) Natalia Zvereva	(Germany) Christina Singer (Belarus) Natalia Zvereva	(Japan) Kimiko Date (Indonesia) Yayuk Basuki (United States) Lori McNeil (Argentina) Inés Gorrochategui
26 June; 3 July	Wimbledon; London, Great Britain; Grand Slam; Grass – $3,044,890 – 128S/64Q/64D/64X; Singles – Doubles – Mixed doubles	(Germany) Steffi Graf; 4–6, 6–1, 7–5	(Spain) Arantxa Sánchez Vicario	(Czech Republic) Jana Novotná (Spain) Conchita Martínez	(United States) Mary Joe Fernández (Japan) Kimiko Date (Argentina) Gabriela Sabatini (Netherlands) Brenda Schultz-McCarthy
26 June; 3 July	Wimbledon; London, Great Britain; Grand Slam; Grass – $3,044,890 – 128S/64Q/64D/64X; Singles – Doubles – Mixed doubles	(Czech Republic) Jana Novotná (Spain) Arantxa Sánchez Vicario; 5–7, 7–5, 6–4	(United States) Gigi Fernández (Belarus) Natalia Zvereva	(Czech Republic) Jana Novotná (Spain) Conchita Martínez	(United States) Mary Joe Fernández (Japan) Kimiko Date (Argentina) Gabriela Sabatini (Netherlands) Brenda Schultz-McCarthy
26 June; 3 July	Wimbledon; London, Great Britain; Grand Slam; Grass – $3,044,890 – 128S/64Q/64D/64X; Singles – Doubles – Mixed doubles	(United States) Martina Navratilova (United States) Jonathan Stark; 6–4, 6–4	(United States) Gigi Fernández (Czech Republic) Cyril Suk	(Czech Republic) Jana Novotná (Spain) Conchita Martínez	(United States) Mary Joe Fernández (Japan) Kimiko Date (Argentina) Gabriela Sabatini (Netherlands) Brenda Schultz-McCarthy

=== July ===
Week	Tournament	Champions	Runners-up	Semifinalists	Quarterfinalists
10 Jul	Internazionali Femminili di Palermo; Palermo, Italy; Tier IV; Clay – $107,500 – 32S/16D; Singles – Doubles	(Romania) Irina Spîrlea; 7–6^{(7–1)}, 6–2	(Germany) Sabine Hack	(Ukraine) Natalia Medvedeva (Austria) Barbara Schett	(Slovakia) Karina Habšudová (Italy) Flora Perfetti (Germany) Veronika Martinek (Italy) Silvia Farina
10 Jul	Internazionali Femminili di Palermo; Palermo, Italy; Tier IV; Clay – $107,500 – 32S/16D; Singles – Doubles	(Czech Republic) Radka Bobková (Czech Republic) Petra Langrová; 6–4, 6–1	(Austria) Petra Schwarz (Slovakia) Katarína Studeníková	(Ukraine) Natalia Medvedeva (Austria) Barbara Schett	(Slovakia) Karina Habšudová (Italy) Flora Perfetti (Germany) Veronika Martinek (Italy) Silvia Farina
17 Jul	Fed Cup Semifinals; Santander, Spain, Clay; Wilmington, United States; Carpet (i)	Semifinals winners Spain 3–2; United States 3-2	Semifinals losers Germany; France		
24 Jul	Styrian Open; Styria, Austria; Tier IV; Clay – $107,500 – 32S/16D; Singles – Doubles	(Austria) Judith Wiesner; 7–6, 6–3	(Romania) Ruxandra Dragomir	(Federal Republic of Yugoslavia) Tatjana Ječmenica (Austria) Barbara Paulus	(Spain) Ángeles Montolio (Italy) Silvia Farina (Italy) Anna-Maria Cecchini (Spain) Silvia Ramón-Cortés
24 Jul	Styrian Open; Styria, Austria; Tier IV; Clay – $107,500 – 32S/16D; Singles – Doubles	(Italy) Silvia Farina (Hungary) Andrea Temesvári; 6–2, 6–2	(France) Alexandra Fusai (Germany) Wiltrud Probst	(Federal Republic of Yugoslavia) Tatjana Ječmenica (Austria) Barbara Paulus	(Spain) Ángeles Montolio (Italy) Silvia Farina (Italy) Anna-Maria Cecchini (Spain) Silvia Ramón-Cortés
31 Jul	Toshiba Classic; San Diego, United States; Tier II; Hard – $430,000 – 48S/28D; Singles – Doubles	(Spain) Conchita Martínez; 6–2, 6–0	(United States) Lisa Raymond	(France) Sandrine Testud (France) Mary Pierce	(United States) Marianne Werdel-Witmeyer (United States) Gigi Fernández (Australia) Rachel McQuillan (Sweden) Åsa Carlsson
31 Jul	Toshiba Classic; San Diego, United States; Tier II; Hard – $430,000 – 48S/28D; Singles – Doubles	(United States) Gigi Fernández (Belarus) Natalia Zvereva; 6–2, 6–1	(France) Alexia Dechaume-Balleret (France) Sandrine Testud	(France) Sandrine Testud (France) Mary Pierce	(United States) Marianne Werdel-Witmeyer (United States) Gigi Fernández (Australia) Rachel McQuillan (Sweden) Åsa Carlsson

=== August ===
Week	Tournament	Champions	Runners-up	Semifinalists	Quarterfinalists
7 Aug	Acura Classic; Manhattan Beach, United States; Tier II; Hard – $430,000 – 48S/28D; Singles – Doubles	(Spain) Conchita Martínez; 4–6, 6–1, 6–3	(United States) Chanda Rubin	(Spain) Arantxa Sánchez Vicario (Indonesia) Yayuk Basuki	(Belarus) Natalia Zvereva (Argentina) Gabriela Sabatini (United States) Lindsay Davenport (Germany) Anke Huber
7 Aug	Acura Classic; Manhattan Beach, United States; Tier II; Hard – $430,000 – 48S/28D; Singles – Doubles	(United States) Gigi Fernández (Belarus) Natalia Zvereva; 7–5, 6–7, 7–5	(Latvia) Larisa Savchenko (Argentina) Gabriela Sabatini	(Spain) Arantxa Sánchez Vicario (Indonesia) Yayuk Basuki	(Belarus) Natalia Zvereva (Argentina) Gabriela Sabatini (United States) Lindsay Davenport (Germany) Anke Huber
14 Aug	Canadian Open; Toronto, Canada; Tier I Hard – $806,250 – 56S/32Q/28D; Singles – Doubles	(United States) Monica Seles; 6–0, 6–1	(South Africa) Amanda Coetzer	(Czech Republic) Jana Novotná (Argentina) Gabriela Sabatini	(France) Mary Pierce (Croatia) Iva Majoli (Czech Republic) Helena Suková (Germany) Anke Huber
14 Aug	Canadian Open; Toronto, Canada; Tier I Hard – $806,250 – 56S/32Q/28D; Singles – Doubles	(Argentina) Gabriela Sabatini (Netherlands) Brenda Schultz-McCarthy; 4–6, 6–0, 6–3	(Switzerland) Martina Hingis (Croatia) Iva Majoli	(Czech Republic) Jana Novotná (Argentina) Gabriela Sabatini	(France) Mary Pierce (Croatia) Iva Majoli (Czech Republic) Helena Suková (Germany) Anke Huber
28 Aug; 4 Sep	US Open; New York City, United States; Grand Slam; Hard – $4,271,000 – 128S/64Q/64D/32X; Singles – Doubles – Mixed doubles	(Germany) Steffi Graf; 7–6, 0–6, 6–3	(United States) Monica Seles	(Argentina) Gabriela Sabatini (Spain) Conchita Martínez	(United States) Amy Frazier (United States) Mary Joe Fernández (Netherlands) Brenda Schultz-McCarthy (Czech Republic) Jana Novotná
28 Aug; 4 Sep	US Open; New York City, United States; Grand Slam; Hard – $4,271,000 – 128S/64Q/64D/32X; Singles – Doubles – Mixed doubles	(United States) Gigi Fernández (Belarus) Natalia Zvereva; 7–5, 6–3	(Netherlands) Brenda Schultz-McCarthy (Australia) Rennae Stubbs	(Argentina) Gabriela Sabatini (Spain) Conchita Martínez	(United States) Amy Frazier (United States) Mary Joe Fernández (Netherlands) Brenda Schultz-McCarthy (Czech Republic) Jana Novotná
28 Aug; 4 Sep	US Open; New York City, United States; Grand Slam; Hard – $4,271,000 – 128S/64Q/64D/32X; Singles – Doubles – Mixed doubles	(United States) Meredith McGrath (United States) Matt Lucena; 6–4, 6–4	(United States) Gigi Fernández (Czech Republic) Cyril Suk	(Argentina) Gabriela Sabatini (Spain) Conchita Martínez	(United States) Amy Frazier (United States) Mary Joe Fernández (Netherlands) Brenda Schultz-McCarthy (Czech Republic) Jana Novotná

=== September ===
Week	Tournament	Champions	Runners-up	Semifinalists	Quarterfinalists
11 Sep	Warsaw Cup by Heros; Warsaw, Poland; Tier III; Clay – $161,250 – 32S/16D; Singles – Doubles	(Austria) Barbara Paulus; 7–6^{(7–4)}, 4–6, 6–1	(France) Alexandra Fusai	(Poland) Magdalena Grzybowska (Germany) Karin Kschwendt	(Germany) Jana Kandarr (Czech Republic) Kateřina Kroupová (Czech Republic) Ludmila Richterová (Belarus) Tatiana Ignatieva
11 Sep	Warsaw Cup by Heros; Warsaw, Poland; Tier III; Clay – $161,250 – 32S/16D; Singles – Doubles	(Italy) Anna-Maria Cecchini (Italy) Laura Garrone; 5–7, 6–2, 6–3	(Slovakia) Henrieta Nagyová (Slovakia) Denisa Szabová	(Poland) Magdalena Grzybowska (Germany) Karin Kschwendt	(Germany) Jana Kandarr (Czech Republic) Kateřina Kroupová (Czech Republic) Ludmila Richterová (Belarus) Tatiana Ignatieva
11 Sep	TVA Cup; Nagoya, Japan; Tier IV; Carpet (i) – $107,500 – 32S/16D; Singles – Doubles	(United States) Linda Wild; 6–4, 6–2	(Czech Republic) Sandra Kleinová	(Japan) Yone Kamio (Australia) Kristin Godridge	(Japan) Rika Hiraki (South Korea) Sung-Hee Park (United States) Laxmi Poruri (Australia) Kerry-Anne Guse
11 Sep	TVA Cup; Nagoya, Japan; Tier IV; Carpet (i) – $107,500 – 32S/16D; Singles – Doubles	(Australia) Kerry-Anne Guse (Australia) Kristine Radford; 6–4, 6–4	(Japan) Rika Hiraki (South Korea) Sung-Hee Park	(Japan) Yone Kamio (Australia) Kristin Godridge	(Japan) Rika Hiraki (South Korea) Sung-Hee Park (United States) Laxmi Poruri (Australia) Kerry-Anne Guse
18 Sep	Moscow Ladies Open; Moscow, Russia; Tier III; Carpet (i) – $161,250 – 32S/16D; Singles – Doubles	(Bulgaria) Magdalena Maleeva; 6–4, 6–2	(Russia) Elena Makarova	(United States) Meredith McGrath (Italy) Adriana Serra Zanetti	(Sweden) Åsa Carlsson (Russia) Elena Likhovtseva (Belgium) Sabine Appelmans (Finland) Nanne Dahlman
18 Sep	Moscow Ladies Open; Moscow, Russia; Tier III; Carpet (i) – $161,250 – 32S/16D; Singles – Doubles	(United States) Meredith McGrath (Latvia) Larisa Savchenko; 6–1, 6–0	(Russia) Anna Kournikova (Poland) Aleksandra Olsza	(United States) Meredith McGrath (Italy) Adriana Serra Zanetti	(Sweden) Åsa Carlsson (Russia) Elena Likhovtseva (Belgium) Sabine Appelmans (Finland) Nanne Dahlman
18 Sep	Nichirei International Championships; Tokyo, Japan; Tier II; Hard – $430,000 – 28S/16D; Singles – Doubles	(France) Mary Pierce; 6–3, 6–3	(Spain) Arantxa Sánchez Vicario	(Argentina) Gabriela Sabatini (South Africa) Amanda Coetzer	(Japan) Naoko Sawamatsu (United States) Lindsay Davenport (South Korea) Sung-Hee Park (United States) Amy Frazier
18 Sep	Nichirei International Championships; Tokyo, Japan; Tier II; Hard – $430,000 – 28S/16D; Singles – Doubles	(United States) Lindsay Davenport (United States) Mary Joe Fernández; 6–3, 6–2	(South Africa) Amanda Coetzer (United States) Linda Wild	(Argentina) Gabriela Sabatini (South Africa) Amanda Coetzer	(Japan) Naoko Sawamatsu (United States) Lindsay Davenport (South Korea) Sung-Hee Park (United States) Amy Frazier
25 Sep	Sparkassen Cup; Leipzig, Germany; Tier II; Carpet (i) – $430,000 – 28S/16D; Singles – Doubles	(Germany) Anke Huber; Walkover	(Bulgaria) Magdalena Maleeva	(Austria) Judith Wiesner (United States) Marianne Werdel-Witmeyer	(Czech Republic) Jana Novotná (Russia) Elena Likhovtseva (South Africa) Joannette Kruger (United States) Lindsay Lee
25 Sep	Sparkassen Cup; Leipzig, Germany; Tier II; Carpet (i) – $430,000 – 28S/16D; Singles – Doubles	(Latvia) Larisa Savchenko (United States) Meredith McGrath; 6–4, 6–4	(Netherlands) Brenda Schultz-McCarthy (Netherlands) Caroline Vis	(Austria) Judith Wiesner (United States) Marianne Werdel-Witmeyer	(Czech Republic) Jana Novotná (Russia) Elena Likhovtseva (South Africa) Joannette Kruger (United States) Lindsay Lee
25 Sep	Nokia Open; Beijing, China; Tier IV; Hard – $107,500 – 32S/16D; Singles – Doubles	(United States) Linda Wild; 7–5, 6–2	(Chinese Taipei) Wang Shi-ting	(Australia) Kristin Godridge (United States) Shaun Stafford	(South Korea) Mi-Ra Jeon (United States) Ann Grossman (Netherlands) Petra Kamstra (Ukraine) Elena Tatarkova
25 Sep	Nokia Open; Beijing, China; Tier IV; Hard – $107,500 – 32S/16D; Singles – Doubles	(Germany) Claudia Porwik (United States) Linda Wild; 6–1, 6–0	(Netherlands) Stephanie Rottier (Chinese Taipei) Wang Shi-ting	(Australia) Kristin Godridge (United States) Shaun Stafford	(South Korea) Mi-Ra Jeon (United States) Ann Grossman (Netherlands) Petra Kamstra (Ukraine) Elena Tatarkova

=== October ===
Week	Tournament	Champions	Runners-up	Semifinalists	Quarterfinalists
2 Oct	Wismilak Open; Surabaya, Indonesia; Tier IV; Hard – $107,500 – 32S/14Q/16D; Singles – Doubles	(Chinese Taipei) Wang Shi-ting; 6–1, 6–1	(China) Jing-Qian Yi	(Slovenia) Tina Križan (Australia) Annabel Ellwood	(Ukraine) Elena Brioukhovets (China) Fang Li (China) Chen Li-Ling (France) Sarah Pitkowski
2 Oct	Wismilak Open; Surabaya, Indonesia; Tier IV; Hard – $107,500 – 32S/14Q/16D; Singles – Doubles	(Netherlands) Petra Kamstra (Slovenia) Tina Križan; 2–6, 6–4, 6–1	(Japan) Nana Miyagi (United States) Stephanie Reece	(Slovenia) Tina Križan (Australia) Annabel Ellwood	(Ukraine) Elena Brioukhovets (China) Fang Li (China) Chen Li-Ling (France) Sarah Pitkowski
2 Oct	European Indoors; Zürich, Switzerland; Tier I Hard (i) – $806,250 – 28S/16D; Singles – Doubles	(Croatia) Iva Majoli; 6–4, 6–4	(France) Mary Pierce	(United States) Chanda Rubin (South Africa) Mariaan de Swardt	(Czech Republic) Jana Novotná (Bulgaria) Magdalena Maleeva (South Africa) Joannette Kruger (Netherlands) Brenda Schultz-McCarthy
2 Oct	European Indoors; Zürich, Switzerland; Tier I Hard (i) – $806,250 – 28S/16D; Singles – Doubles	(United States) Nicole Arendt (Netherlands) Manon Bollegraf; 6–4, 6–7^{(4–7)}, 6–4	(United States) Chanda Rubin (Netherlands) Caroline Vis	(United States) Chanda Rubin (South Africa) Mariaan de Swardt	(Czech Republic) Jana Novotná (Bulgaria) Magdalena Maleeva (South Africa) Joannette Kruger (Netherlands) Brenda Schultz-McCarthy
9 Oct	Porsche Tennis Grand Prix; Filderstadt, Germany; Tier II; Hard (i) – $430,000 – 28S/16D; Singles – Doubles	(Croatia) Iva Majoli; 6–4, 7–6^{(7–4)}	(Argentina) Gabriela Sabatini	(Germany) Anke Huber (United States) Chanda Rubin	(Germany) Petra Begerow (Netherlands) Brenda Schultz-McCarthy (Belarus) Natalia Zvereva (France) Mary Pierce
9 Oct	Porsche Tennis Grand Prix; Filderstadt, Germany; Tier II; Hard (i) – $430,000 – 28S/16D; Singles – Doubles	(United States) Gigi Fernández (Belarus) Natalia Zvereva; 5–7, 6–1, 6–4	(United States) Meredith McGrath (Latvia) Larisa Savchenko	(Germany) Anke Huber (United States) Chanda Rubin	(Germany) Petra Begerow (Netherlands) Brenda Schultz-McCarthy (Belarus) Natalia Zvereva (France) Mary Pierce
17 Oct	Brighton International; Brighton, Great Britain; Tier II; Carpet (i) – $430,000 – 28S/16D; Singles – Doubles	(United States) Mary Joe Fernández; 6–4, 7–5	(South Africa) Amanda Coetzer	(Netherlands) Kristie Boogert (Bulgaria) Magdalena Maleeva	(South Africa) Mariaan de Swardt (Austria) Barbara Paulus (Czech Republic) Helena Suková (Netherlands) Miriam Oremans
17 Oct	Brighton International; Brighton, Great Britain; Tier II; Carpet (i) – $430,000 – 28S/16D; Singles – Doubles	(United States) Meredith McGrath (Latvia) Larisa Savchenko; 7–5, 6–1	(United States) Lori McNeil (Czech Republic) Helena Suková	(Netherlands) Kristie Boogert (Bulgaria) Magdalena Maleeva	(South Africa) Mariaan de Swardt (Austria) Barbara Paulus (Czech Republic) Helena Suková (Netherlands) Miriam Oremans
30 Oct	Challenge Bell; Quebec City, Canada; Tier III; Carpet (i) – $161,250 – 32S/32Q/16D; Singles – Doubles	(Netherlands) Brenda Schultz-McCarthy; 7–6, 6–2	(Belgium) Dominique Monami	(United States) Lindsay Lee (Australia) Rennae Stubbs	(France) Sandrine Testud (France) Julie Halard-Decugis (Belgium) Laurence Courtois (South Africa) Amanda Coetzer
30 Oct	Challenge Bell; Quebec City, Canada; Tier III; Carpet (i) – $161,250 – 32S/32Q/16D; Singles – Doubles	(United States) Nicole Arendt (Netherlands) Manon Bollegraf; 7–6, 4–6, 6–2	(United States) Lisa Raymond (Australia) Rennae Stubbs	(United States) Lindsay Lee (Australia) Rennae Stubbs	(France) Sandrine Testud (France) Julie Halard-Decugis (Belgium) Laurence Courtois (South Africa) Amanda Coetzer
30 Oct	Bank of the West Classic; Oakland, United States; Tier II; Carpet (i) – $430,000 – 28S/14D; Singles – Doubles	(Bulgaria) Magdalena Maleeva; 6–3, 6–4	(Japan) Ai Sugiyama	(United States) Lindsay Davenport (United States) Mary Joe Fernández	(United States) Zina Garrison-Jackson (Czech Republic) Helena Suková (United States) Linda Wild (United States) Venus Williams
30 Oct	Bank of the West Classic; Oakland, United States; Tier II; Carpet (i) – $430,000 – 28S/14D; Singles – Doubles	(United States) Lori McNeil (Czech Republic) Helena Suková; 3–6, 6–4, 6–3	(United States) Katrina Adams (United States) Zina Garrison-Jackson	(United States) Lindsay Davenport (United States) Mary Joe Fernández	(United States) Zina Garrison-Jackson (Czech Republic) Helena Suková (United States) Linda Wild (United States) Venus Williams

=== November ===
Week	Tournament	Champions	Runners-up	Semifinalists	Quarterfinalists
6 Nov	Advanta Championships of Philadelphia; Philadelphia, United States; Tier I Carpet (i) – $806,250 – 28S/32Q/16D; Singles – Doubles	(Germany) Steffi Graf; 6–1, 4–6, 6–3	(United States) Lori McNeil	(United States) Zina Garrison-Jackson (Germany) Anke Huber	(United States) Meredith McGrath (Romania) Irina Spîrlea (Argentina) Gabriela Sabatini (Spain) Conchita Martínez
6 Nov	Advanta Championships of Philadelphia; Philadelphia, United States; Tier I Carpet (i) – $806,250 – 28S/32Q/16D; Singles – Doubles	(United States) Lori McNeil (Czech Republic) Helena Suková; 4–6, 6–3, 6–4	(United States) Meredith McGrath (Latvia) Larisa Savchenko	(United States) Zina Garrison-Jackson (Germany) Anke Huber	(United States) Meredith McGrath (Romania) Irina Spîrlea (Argentina) Gabriela Sabatini (Spain) Conchita Martínez
13 Nov	WTA Tour Championships; New York City, United States; WTA Tour Championships; Carpet (i) – $2,000,000 – 16S/9D; Singles – Doubles	(Germany) Steffi Graf; 6–1, 2–6, 6–1, 4–6, 6–3	(Germany) Anke Huber	(Belarus) Natalia Zvereva (Netherlands) Brenda Schultz-McCarthy	(United States) Mary Joe Fernández (Argentina) Gabriela Sabatini (Japan) Kimiko Date (Spain) Conchita Martínez
13 Nov	WTA Tour Championships; New York City, United States; WTA Tour Championships; Carpet (i) – $2,000,000 – 16S/9D; Singles – Doubles	(Czech Republic) Jana Novotná (Spain) Arantxa Sánchez Vicario; 6–2, 6–1	(United States) Gigi Fernández (Belarus) Natalia Zvereva	(Belarus) Natalia Zvereva (Netherlands) Brenda Schultz-McCarthy	(United States) Mary Joe Fernández (Argentina) Gabriela Sabatini (Japan) Kimiko Date (Spain) Conchita Martínez
13 Nov	Volvo Women's Open; Pattaya City, Thailand; Tier IV; Hard – $107,500 – 32S/32Q/16D; Singles – Doubles	(Austria) Barbara Paulus; 6–4, 6–3	(China) Jing-Qian Yi	(Italy) Rita Grande (Japan) Naoko Kijimuta	(Poland) Aleksandra Olsza (Venezuela) Maria-Alejandra Vento (Hong Kong) Tang Min (Chinese Taipei) Wang Shi-ting
13 Nov	Volvo Women's Open; Pattaya City, Thailand; Tier IV; Hard – $107,500 – 32S/32Q/16D; Singles – Doubles	(Canada) Jill Hetherington (Australia) Kristine Radford; 2–6, 6–4, 6–3	(Australia) Kristin Godridge (Japan) Nana Miyagi	(Italy) Rita Grande (Japan) Naoko Kijimuta	(Poland) Aleksandra Olsza (Venezuela) Maria-Alejandra Vento (Hong Kong) Tang Min (Chinese Taipei) Wang Shi-ting
20 Nov	Fed Cup Final; Valencia, Spain, Clay	Spain; 3–2	United States		

== Statistical Information ==
List of players and titles won, last name alphabetically:

- Steffi Graf – Paris, Delray Beach, Miami, Houston, French Open, Wimbledon, US Open, Philadelphia, WTA Tour Championships (9)
- Conchita Martínez – Hilton Head, Amelia Island, Hamburg, Rome, San Diego, Manhattan Beach (6)
- Magdalena Maleeva – Chicago, Moscow, Oakland (3)
- Mary Joe Fernández – Indian Wells, Brighton (2)
- Iva Majoli – Zurich, Filderstadt (2)
- Barbara Paulus – Warsaw, Pattaya City (2)
- Mary Pierce – Australian Open, Tokyo (Tier II) (2)
- Arantxa Sánchez Vicario – Barcelona, Berlin (2)
- Brenda Schultz-McCarthy – Oklahoma City, Quebec City (2)
- Linda Wild – Nagoya, Beijing (2)
- Sabine Appelmans – Zagreb (1)
- Nicole Bradtke – Auckland (1)
- Kimiko Date – Tokyo (Tier I) (1)
- Lindsay Davenport – Strasbourg (1)
- Amy Frazier – Tokyo (Tier III) (1)
- Zina Garrison-Jackson – Birmingham (1)
- Sabine Hack – Jakarta (1)
- Julie Halard – Prague (1)
- Anke Huber – Leipzig (1)
- Joannette Kruger – San Juan (1)
- Leila Meskhi – Hobart (1)
- Jana Novotná – Linz (1)
- Ludmila Richterová – Bournemouth (1)
- Gabriela Sabatini – Sydney (1)
- Monica Seles – Toronto (1)
- Irina Spîrlea – Palermo (1)
- Nathalie Tauziat – Eastbourne (1)
- Wang Shi-ting – Surabaya (1)
- Judith Wiesner – Styria (1)

The following players won their first title:

- (South Africa) Joannette Kruger – San Juan
- (Czech Republic) Ludmila Richterová – Bournemouth
- (Croatia) Iva Majoli – Zurich

== Rankings ==
Below are the 1995 WTA year-end rankings in both singles and doubles competition:

Singles Year-end Ranking
No	Player Name	Points	1994	Change
1	Steffi Graf (GER)	393.2500	1	=
1*	Monica Seles (USA)	-	NR	NR
2	Conchita Martínez (ESP)	255.6026	3	+1
3	Arantxa Sánchez Vicario (ESP)	228.7721	2	-1
4	Kimiko Date (JPN)	165.1314	9	+5
5	Mary Pierce (FRA)	159.8320	5	=
6	Magdalena Maleeva (BUL)	149.0357	11	+5
7	Gabriela Sabatini (ARG)	147.5239	7	=
8	Mary Joe Fernández (USA)	136.6660	14	+6
9	Iva Majoli (CRO)	135.3165	13	+4
10	Anke Huber (GER)	129.6438	12	+2
11	Jana Novotná (CZE)	125.5905	4	-7
12	Lindsay Davenport (USA)	112.0667	6	-6
13	Brenda Schultz-McCarthy (NED)	99.9412	15	+2
14	Natalia Zvereva (BLR)	93.7059	10	-4
15	Chanda Rubin (USA)	91.6389	23	+8
16	Martina Hingis (SUI)	70.5417	87	+71
17	Naoko Sawamatsu (JPN)	69.2154	26	+9
18	Amy Frazier (USA)	66.1750	16	-2
19	Amanda Coetzer (RSA)	62.2826	18	-1
20	Lisa Raymond (USA)	59.8188	44	+24

- Co-ranked #1 for her first six tournaments.

Doubles Year-end Ranking
No	Player Name	Points	1994	Change
1	Arantxa Sánchez Vicario (ESP)	469.6250	3	+2
2	Jana Novotná (CZE)	445.3214	4	+2
3	Gigi Fernández (USA)	438.3460	2	-1
4	Natasha Zvereva (BLR)	396.1111	1	-3
5	Larisa Neiland (LAT)	254.1731	11	+6
6	Lindsay Davenport (USA)	248.8333	8	+2
7	Meredith McGrath (USA)	235.5250	6	-1
8	Manon Bollegraf (NED)	215.3261	9	+1
9	Helena Suková (CZE)	207.7500	23	+14
10	Mary Joe Fernández (USA)	203.9643	26	+16
11	Nicole Arendt (USA)	193.4217	24	+13
12	Brenda Schultz-McCarthy (NED)	192.7676	31	+19
13	Gabriela Sabatini (ARG)	182.0714	14	+1
14	Rennae Stubbs (AUS)	181.9412	17	+3
15	Lori McNeil (USA)	176.9737	15	=
16	Lisa Raymond (USA)	157.9231	10	-6
17	Conchita Martínez (ESP)	141.6071	41	-24
18	Pam Shriver (USA)	136.5000	12	-6
19	Patty Fendick (USA)	122.4231	7	-12
20	Nathalie Tauziat (FRA)	119.9096	22	+2

== See also ==
- 1995 ATP Tour
