= 1995 TVA Cup – Singles =

Singles
- 1995 TVA Cup

Final
- Champion: (United States) Linda Wild
- Runner-up: (Czech Republic) Sandra Kleinová
- Score: 6–4, 6–2

Details
- Draw: 32
- Seeds: 8

Events
Singles	Doubles
TVA Cup

Linda Wild won in the final 6–4, 6–2 against Sandra Kleinová.

== Seeds ==
A champion seed is indicated in bold text while text in italics indicates the round in which that seed was eliminated.

1. (Japan) Yone Kamio (semifinals)
2. (Japan) Kyoko Nagatsuka (first round)
3. (Japan) Mana Endo (second round)
4. (Japan) Ai Sugiyama (second round)
5. (United States) Shaun Stafford (first round)
6. (Canada) Jana Nejedly (second round)
7. (South Korea) Sung-Hee Park (quarterfinals)
8. (United States) Jolene Watanabe (second round)

== Draw ==
=== Key ===
- Q = Qualifier
- WC = Wild card
- LL = Lucky loser
- Alt = Alternate
- SE = Special exempt
- PR = Protected ranking
- ITF = ITF entry
- JE = Junior exempt
- w/o = Walkover
- r = Retired
- d = Defaulted
- SR = Special ranking

=== Main draw ===
First round
1	(Japan) **Y Kamio**	**6**	**6**
(Japan) M Saeki	3	1
Q	(Switzerland) E Gagliardi	**7**	3	4
(Germany) **C Porwik**	6	**6**	**6**
Q	(Australia) **L Pleming**	**6**	3	**7**
(Jamaica) I McCalla	4	**6**	6
(Japan) **R Hiraki**	**6**	**6**
5	(United States) S Stafford	1	2
3	(Japan) **M Endo**	**7**	**6**
(Australia) K Radford	6	1
Q	(Japan) Y Hosoki	3	3
(Czech Republic) **S Kleinová**	**6**	**6**
(Japan) **M Miyauchi**	**6**	3	**6**
(Slovakia) P Marková	3	**6**	2
WC	(Japan) H Mochizuki	1	3
7	(South Korea) **S-H Park**	**6**	**6**
8	(United States) **J Watanabe**	**6**	**7**
(Japan) Y Yoshida	4	5
(United States) **L Wild**	**6**	**6**
WC	(Japan) K Shibata	1	4
(United States) **L Poruri**	1	**7**	**7**
(Japan) N Kijimuta	**6**	6	6
LL	(Japan) K Ishida	2	0
4	(Japan) **A Sugiyama**	**6**	**6**
6	(Canada) **J Nejedly**	5	**6**	**6**
LL	(Japan) K Takuma	**7**	0	3
(Australia) **K-A Guse**	**6**	4	**6**
Q	(United States) A Lettiere	1	**6**	4
LL	(Japan) A Fukuda	0	0
(United States) **E Rossides**	**6**	**6**
(Australia) **K Godridge**	**6**	6	**6**
2	(Japan) K Nagatsuka	4	**7**	4

Second round
1	(Japan) **Y Kamio**	**6**	3	**7**
(Germany) C Porwik	4	**6**	6
Q	(Australia) L Pleming	4	1
(Japan) **R Hiraki**	**6**	**6**
3	(Japan) M Endo	**6**	3	1
(Czech Republic) **S Kleinová**	2	**6**	**6**
(Japan) M Miyauchi	2	3
7	(South Korea) **S-H Park**	**6**	**6**
8	(United States) J Watanabe	3	**6**	3
(United States) **L Wild**	**6**	3	**6**
(United States) **L Poruri**	**6**	1	**6**
4	(Japan) A Sugiyama	1	**6**	4
6	(Canada) J Nejedly	4	**6**	3
(Australia) **K-A Guse**	**6**	4	**6**
(United States) E Rossides	**6**	6	4
(Australia) **K Godridge**	2	**7**	**6**

Quarterfinals
1	(Japan) **Y Kamio**	**6**	**6**
(Japan) R Hiraki	2	4
(Czech Republic) **S Kleinová**	**6**	3	**6**
7	(South Korea) S-H Park	0	**6**	3
(United States) **L Wild**	**6**	**6**
(United States) L Poruri	2	4
(Australia) K-A Guse	2	3
(Australia) **K Godridge**	**6**	**6**

Semifinals
1	(Japan) Y Kamio	1	5
(Czech Republic) **S Kleinová**	**6**	**7**
(United States) **L Wild**	**6**	**6**
(Australia) K Godridge	0	0

Final
(Czech Republic) Sandra Kleinová	4	2
(United States) **Linda Wild**	**6**	**6**
