= 1995 TVA Cup =

- Date: 12–17 September
- Edition: 1st
- Category: Tier IV
- Draw: 32S / 16D
- Prize money: $107,500
- Surface: Carpet / indoor
- Location: Nagoya, Japan
- Venue: Aichi Prefectural Gymnasium

Champions

Singles
- (United States) Linda Wild

Doubles
- (Australia) Kerry-Anne Guse / (Australia) Kristine Radford
TVA Cup

The 1995 TVA Cup was a women's tennis tournament played on indoor carpet courts at the Aichi Prefectural Gymnasium in Nagoya, Japan that was part of Tier IV of the 1995 WTA Tour. It was the only edition of the tournament and was held from 12 September through 17 September 1995. Unseeded Linda Wild won the singles title.

== Finals ==
=== Singles ===
(United States) Linda Wild defeated (Czech Republic) Sandra Kleinová 6–4, 6–2

- It was Wild's 2nd title of the year and the 6th of her career.

=== Doubles ===
(Australia) Kerry-Anne Guse / (Australia) Kristine Radford defeated (Japan) Rika Hiraki / (South Korea) Sung-Hee Park 6–4, 6–4

- It was Guse's 1st title of the year and the 2nd of her career. It was Radford's 1st title of the year and the 3rd of her career.
