= 1995 French Open – Women's singles qualifying =

Women's singles qualifying
- 1995 French Open

Events
Singles	men	women		boys	girls
Doubles	men	women	mixed	boys	girls
WC Singles	men	women	quad
WC Doubles	men	women	quad
Legends	−45	45+	women

Qualification
Singles	men	women
- French Open

Players who neither had high enough rankings nor received wild cards to enter the main draw of the annual French Open Tennis Championships participated in a qualifying tournament held in the week before the event.

== Seeds ==
1. (Germany) Veronika Martinek (qualifying competition, lucky loser)
2. (Italy) Flora Perfetti (second round)
3. (Czech Republic) Petra Langrová (qualifying competition)
4. (Slovakia) Janette Husárová (first round)
5. (Belgium) Els Callens (qualified)
6. (Finland) Nanne Dahlman (second round)
7. (Austria) Barbara Schett (qualified)
8. (Spain) Cristina Torrens Valero (first round)
9. (Russia) Tatiana Panova (first round)
10. (Italy) Rita Grande (first round)
11. (Spain) Silvia Ramón-Cortés (first round)
12. (Spain) María Sánchez Lorenzo (first round)
13. (Netherlands) Kim de Weille (second round)
14. (Argentina) Bettina Fulco (first round)
15. (United States) Meilen Tu (second round)
16. (United States) Laxmi Poruri (first round)

== Qualifiers ==
1. (Argentina) Paola Suárez
2. (Argentina) María José Gaidano
3. (Finland) Petra Thorén
4. (Austria) Barbara Schett
5. (United States) Erika deLone
6. (France) Amélie Mauresmo
7. (Belgium) Els Callens
8. (Romania) Cătălina Cristea

== Lucky losers ==
1. (Germany) Veronika Martinek

== Qualifying draw ==
Key

- Q = Qualifier
- WC = Wild card
- LL = Lucky loser
- Alt = Alternate
- ITF = ITF entry
- PR = Protected ranking
- SR = Special ranking
- SE = Special exempt
- JE = Junior exempt
- JR = Junior Accelerator Programme entrant
- CO = College Accelerator Programme entrant
- NG = Next Gen Accelerator Program entrant
- w/o = Walkover
- r = Retired
- d = Defaulted

=== First qualifier ===
First round
1	(Germany) Veronika Martinek	6	6
(Netherlands) Caroline Vis	2	0
WC	(France) Amélie Oudéa-Castéra	2	6	6
Alt	(Austria) Marion Maruska	6	4	1
(Brazil) Andrea Vieira	6	6
(Japan) Hiromi Nagano	2	1
(Argentina) Paola Suárez	6	6
12	(Spain) María Sánchez Lorenzo	1	3

Second round
1	(Germany) Veronika Martinek	6	6
WC	(France) Amélie Oudéa-Castéra	1	4
(Brazil) Andrea Vieira	6^{4}	6	3
(Argentina) Paola Suárez	7^{7}	2	6

Qualifying competition
1	(Germany) Veronika Martinek	6	6^{3}	3
(Argentina) Paola Suárez	2	7^{7}	6

=== Second qualifier ===
First round
13	(Netherlands) Kim de Weille	6	6
(Italy) Federica Bonsignori	4	4
(Netherlands) Nicole Muns-Jagerman	6	6
(Thailand) Tamarine Tanasugarn	4	4
(Canada) Sonya Jeyaseelan	5	3
(Argentina) María José Gaidano	7	6
(Australia) Siobhan Drake-Brockman	6	4	3
6	(Finland) Nanne Dahlman	3	6	6

Second round
13	(Netherlands) Kim de Weille	6^{4}	3
(Netherlands) Nicole Muns-Jagerman	7^{7}	6
(Argentina) María José Gaidano	6	6
6	(Finland) Nanne Dahlman	3	2

Qualifying competition
(Netherlands) Nicole Muns-Jagerman	2	1
(Argentina) María José Gaidano	6	6

=== Third qualifier ===
First round
3	(Czech Republic) Petra Langrová	7	6
(Netherlands) Petra Kamstra	5	0
WC	(France) Carole Lucarelli	4	4
WC	(France) Karolina Jagieniak	6	6
(Czech Republic) Kateřina Kroupová-Šišková	3	6	1
(Finland) Petra Thorén	6	4	6
(Canada) Maureen Drake	1	7	3
15	(United States) Meilen Tu	6	5	6

Second round
3	(Czech Republic) Petra Langrová	6	6
WC	(France) Karolina Jagieniak	1	1
(Finland) Petra Thorén	6	1	6
15	(United States) Meilen Tu	4	6	4

Qualifying competition
3	(Czech Republic) Petra Langrová	0	3
(Finland) Petra Thorén	6	6

=== Fourth qualifier ===
First round
9	(Russia) Tatiana Panova	4	3
(Russia) Eugenia Maniokova	6	6
(Madagascar) Dally Randriantefy	6	6
(Spain) Ángeles Montolio	1	4
(United Kingdom) Clare Wood	6	4	4
(Slovenia) Barbara Mulej	3	6	6
(Croatia) Maja Palaveršić	2	1
7	(Austria) Barbara Schett	6	6

Second round
(Russia) Eugenia Maniokova	2	6	3
(Madagascar) Dally Randriantefy	6	4	6
(Slovenia) Barbara Mulej	0	6^{4}
7	(Austria) Barbara Schett	6	7^{7}

Qualifying competition
(Madagascar) Dally Randriantefy	1	6^{8}
7	(Austria) Barbara Schett	6	7^{10}

=== Fifth qualifier ===
First round
8	(Spain) Cristina Torrens Valero	7	2	3
(United States) Erika deLone	5	6	6
WC	(France) Magalie Lamarre	6	6
(Brazil) Luciana Tella	2	1
(Paraguay) Larissa Schaerer	6	4	4
(Netherlands) Maaike Koutstaal	4	6	6
WC	(France) Karine Quentrec	5	7	6
10	(Italy) Rita Grande	7	5	2

Second round
(United States) Erika deLone	7^{7}	6
WC	(France) Magalie Lamarre	6^{3}	1
(Netherlands) Maaike Koutstaal	3	6	4
WC	(France) Karine Quentrec	6	1	6

Qualifying competition
(United States) Erika deLone	7	6
WC	(France) Karine Quentrec	5	3

=== Sixth qualifier ===
First round
14	(Argentina) Bettina Fulco	6	3	7
WC	(France) Amélie Mauresmo	4	6	9
(Australia) Kristin Godridge	6	6
(Netherlands) Yvette Basting	3	0
(United States) Lindsay Lee-Waters	6	6
(Japan) Naoko Kijimuta	1	0
(Italy) Laura Garrone	6	7^{7}
4	(Slovakia) Janette Husárová	4	6^{3}

Second round
WC	(France) Amélie Mauresmo	6	6
(Australia) Kristin Godridge	1	2
(United States) Lindsay Lee-Waters	6	7
(Italy) Laura Garrone	1	5

Qualifying competition
WC	(France) Amélie Mauresmo	6	6
(United States) Lindsay Lee-Waters	4	3

=== Seventh qualifier ===
First round
5	(Belgium) Els Callens	6	6
(Australia) Kirrily Sharpe	3	1
(Italy) Marzia Grossi	4	7	1
(Austria) Melanie Schnell	6	5	6
WC	(France) Virginie Massart	2	6	6
(Australia) Annabel Ellwood	6	2	4
(Italy) Federica Fortuni	1	6	6
11	(Spain) Silvia Ramón-Cortés	6	3	3

Second round
5	(Belgium) Els Callens	7^{8}	2	6
(Austria) Melanie Schnell	6^{6}	6	1
WC	(France) Virginie Massart	6	6
(Italy) Federica Fortuni	2	2

Qualifying competition
5	(Belgium) Els Callens	6	7^{7}
WC	(France) Virginie Massart	3	6^{3}

=== Eighth qualifier ===
First round
16	(United States) Laxmi Poruri	4	5
WC	(France) Sophie Georges	6	7
(Spain) Mariam Ramón Climent	6	6
(Australia) Kerry-Anne Guse	3	1
(Romania) Cătălina Cristea	7	6
(Georgia (country)) Nino Louarsabishvili	5	2
(Russia) Svetlana Komleva	1	7^{7}	4
2	(Italy) Flora Perfetti	6	6^{5}	6

Second round
WC	(France) Sophie Georges	6	0	3
(Spain) Mariam Ramón Climent	0	6	6
(Romania) Cătălina Cristea	6	6
2	(Italy) Flora Perfetti	3	1

Qualifying competition
(Spain) Mariam Ramón Climent	6	4	4
(Romania) Cătălina Cristea	2	6	6
