= 1995 TVA Cup – Doubles =

Doubles
- 1995 TVA Cup

Final
- Champions: (Australia) Kerry-Anne Guse (Australia) Kristine Radford
- Runners-up: (Japan) Rika Hiraki (South Korea) Sung-Hee Park
- Score: 6–4, 6–4

Events
Singles	Doubles
TVA Cup

Kerry-Anne Guse and Kristine Radford won in the final 6–4, 6–4 against Rika Hiraki and Sung-Hee Park.

== Seeds ==
Champion seeds are indicated in bold text while text in italics indicates the round in which those seeds were eliminated.

1. (Germany) Claudia Porwik / (United States) Linda Wild (quarterfinals)
2. (Australia) **Kerry-Anne Guse** / (Australia) **Kristine Radford (champions)**
3. (United States) Laxmi Poruri / (United States) Shaun Stafford (quarterfinals)
4. (Japan) Miho Saeki / (Japan) Yuka Yoshida (first round)

== Draw ==
=== Key ===
- Q = Qualifier
- WC = Wild card
- LL = Lucky loser
- Alt = Alternate
- SE = Special exempt
- PR = Protected ranking
- ITF = ITF entry
- JE = Junior exempt
- w/o = Walkover
- r = Retired
- d = Defaulted
- SR = Special ranking

=== Main draw ===
First round
1	(Germany) **C Porwik** (United States) **L Wild**	**6**	**6**
(Japan) H Mochizuki (Japan) Y Tanaka	1	2
(Japan) **R Hiraki** (South Korea) **S-H Park**	**6**	**6**
(United Kingdom) E Bond (Czech Republic) S Kleinová	4	1
3	(United States) **L Poruri** (United States) **S Stafford**	**6**	**7**
(Japan) M Endo (Japan) N Kijimuta	1	6
(South Africa) L Horn (Slovakia) P Marková	3	5
WC	(Japan) **M Miyauchi** (Japan) **K Shibata**	**6**	**7**
(Australia) **K Godridge** (Australia) **L Pleming**	**6**	**6**
(United States) K Kurth (Jamaica) I McCalla	3	2
(United States) **A Lettiere** (United States) **J Watanabe**	**7**	5	**6**
4	(Japan) M Saeki (Japan) Y Yoshida	6	**7**	1
(Germany) **K Freye** (United States) **E Rossides**	4	**7**	**6**
Q	(Japan) F Kubota (Chinese Taipei) T-T Weng	**6**	5	2
(Japan) S Obata (Japan) N Urabe	1	1
2	(Australia) **K-A Guse** (Australia) **K Radford**	**6**	**6**

Quarterfinals
1	(Germany) C Porwik (United States) L Wild	**6**	3	2
(Japan) **R Hiraki** (South Korea) **S-H Park**	2	**6**	**6**
3	(United States) L Poruri (United States) S Stafford	6	1
WC	(Japan) **M Miyauchi** (Japan) **K Shibata**	**7**	**6**
(Australia) K Godridge (Australia) L Pleming	4	5
(United States) **A Lettiere** (United States) **J Watanabe**	**6**	**7**
(Germany) K Freye (United States) E Rossides	4	3
2	(Australia) **K-A Guse** (Australia) **K Radford**	**6**	**6**

Semifinals
(Japan) **R Hiraki** (South Korea) **S-H Park**	**6**	**7**
WC	(Japan) M Miyauchi (Japan) K Shibata	2	5
(United States) A Lettiere (United States) J Watanabe	3	1
2	(Australia) **K-A Guse** (Australia) **K Radford**	**6**	**6**

Final
(Japan) Rika Hiraki (South Korea) Sung-Hee Park	4	4
2	(Australia) **Kerry-Anne Guse** (Australia) **Kristine Radford**	**6**	**6**
