= 1995 Delray Beach Winter Championships – Doubles =

Doubles
- 1995 Delray Beach Winter Championships
- 1994 Champions: (Czech Republic) Jana Novotná (Spain) Arantxa Sánchez Vicario

Final
- Champions: (United States) Mary Joe Fernández (Czech Republic) Jana Novotná
- Runners-up: (United States) Lori McNeil (Latvia) Larisa Neiland
- Score: 6–4, 6–0

Details
- Draw: 28
- Seeds: 8

Events
Singles	Doubles
← 1994 ·	Delray Beach Winter Championships

Jana Novotná and Arantxa Sánchez Vicario were the defending champions but only Novotná competed that year with Mary Joe Fernández.

Fernández and Novotná won in the final 6–4, 6–0 against Lori McNeil and Larisa Neiland.

== Seeds ==
Champion seeds are indicated in bold text while text in italics indicates the round in which those seeds were eliminated. The top four seeded teams received byes into the second round.

1. (Netherlands) Manon Bollegraf / (United States) Gigi Fernández (semifinals)
2. (United States) Lori McNeil / (Latvia) Larisa Neiland (final)
3. (United States) **Mary Joe Fernández** / (Czech Republic) **Jana Novotná (champions)**
4. (Netherlands) Brenda Schultz / (France) Nathalie Tauziat (quarterfinals)
5. (Indonesia) Yayuk Basuki / (Japan) Nana Miyagi (second round)
6. (Australia) Nicole Bradtke / (Australia) Kristine Radford (second round)
7. (Spain) Conchita Martínez / (Argentina) Patricia Tarabini (quarterfinals)
8. (South Africa) Elna Reinach / (Romania) Irina Spîrlea (quarterfinals)

== Draw ==
=== Key ===
- Q = Qualifier
- WC = Wild card
- LL = Lucky loser
- Alt = Alternate
- SE = Special exempt
- PR = Protected ranking
- ITF = ITF entry
- JE = Junior exempt
- w/o = Walkover
- r = Retired
- d = Defaulted
- SR = Special ranking

=== Final ===
Final
3	(United States) **Mary Joe Fernández** (Czech Republic) **Jana Novotná**	**6**	**6**
2	(United States) Lori McNeil (Latvia) Larisa Savchenko	4	0

=== Top half ===
First round
(Japan) **K Nagatsuka** (Japan) **A Sugiyama**	**6**	**6**
(Belgium) N Feber (South Africa) J Kruger	2	1
(Croatia) **M Murić** (United Kingdom) **C Wood**	**6**	**7**
Q	(Netherlands) C Bakkum (Netherlands) Y Basting	1	6
(France) A Dechaume-Balleret (Argentina) F Labat	3	2
7	(Spain) **C Martínez** (Argentina) **P Tarabini**	**6**	**6**
(Romania) R Dragomir (Italy) L Garrone	3	1
(Czech Republic) **R Bobková** (Slovakia) **R Zrubáková**	**6**	**6**
(Netherlands) **K Boogert** (Netherlands) **N Muns-Jagerman**	**7**	**6**
(Japan) R Hiraki (France) K Quentrec-Eagle	5	3
(Germany) K Kschwendt (Canada) R Simpson	4	2
6	(Australia) **N Bradtke** (Australia) **K Radford**	**6**	**6**

Second round
1	(Netherlands) **M Bollegraf** (United States) **G Fernández**	**7**	**6**
(Japan) K Nagatsuka (Japan) A Sugiyama	6	3
(Croatia) M Murić (United Kingdom) C Wood	4	**6**	3
7	(Spain) **C Martínez** (Argentina) **P Tarabini**	**6**	3	**6**
3	(United States) **M J Fernández** (Czech Republic) **J Novotná**	**6**	**6**
(Czech Republic) R Bobková (Slovakia) R Zrubáková	4	2
(Netherlands) **K Boogert** (Netherlands) **N Muns-Jagerman**	**6**	**6**
6	(Australia) N Bradtke (Australia) K Radford	3	1

Quarterfinals
1	(Netherlands) **M Bollegraf** (United States) **G Fernández**	**1**
7	(Spain) C Martínez (Argentina) P Tarabini	0	r
3	(United States) **M J Fernández** (Czech Republic) **J Novotná**	4	**7**	**7**
(Netherlands) K Boogert (Netherlands) N Muns-Jagerman	**6**	5	5

Semifinals
1	(Netherlands) M Bollegraf (United States) G Fernández	6	3
3	(United States) **M J Fernández** (Czech Republic) **J Novotná**	**7**	**6**

=== Bottom half ===
First round
5	(Indonesia) **Y Basuki** (Japan) **N Miyagi**	**6**	**6**
(Germany) A Huber (Germany) B Rittner	4	2
WC	(United States) **L Poruri** (United States) **M Tu**	**6**	**6**
LL	(Austria) D Leupold (Austria) B Schett	2	3
(France) I Demongeot (United States) S McCarthy	3	**6**	2
(Italy) **R Grande** (Slovakia) **K Studeníková**	**6**	1	**6**
8	(South Africa) **E Reinach** (Romania) **I Spîrlea**	**6**	**6**
(France) S Amiach (United States) E Hakami	0	2
(Canada) M Bernard (Canada) C Delisle	**6**	2	1
(Australia) **R McQuillan** (United States) **M Werdel**	1	**6**	**6**
(United States) N Arendt (Germany) C Singer	6	3
(Italy) **S Farina** (Netherlands) **C Vis**	**7**	**6**

Second round
5	(Indonesia) Y Basuki (Japan) N Miyagi
WC	(United States) **L Poruri** (United States) **M Tu**	**w/o**
(Italy) R Grande (Slovakia) K Studeníková	3	**6**	3
4	(Netherlands) **B Schultz** (France) **N Tauziat**	**6**	3	**6**
8	(South Africa) **E Reinach** (Romania) **I Spîrlea**	**6**	**6**
(Australia) R McQuillan (United States) M Werdel	4	3
(Italy) S Farina (Netherlands) C Vis	1	6
2	(United States) **L McNeil** (Latvia) **L Neiland**	**6**	**7**

Quarterfinals
WC	(United States) **L Poruri** (United States) **M Tu**	**w/o**
4	(Netherlands) B Schultz (France) N Tauziat
8	(South Africa) E Reinach (Romania) I Spîrlea	**7**	1	4
2	(United States) **L McNeil** (Latvia) **L Neiland**	6	**6**	**6**

Semifinals
WC	(United States) L Poruri (United States) M Tu	0	2
2	(United States) **L McNeil** (Latvia) **L Neiland**	**6**	**6**
