= Federica Fortuni =

Italian tennis player

- Country (sports): Italy
- Born: 30 September 1974 (age 50); Rome, Italy
- Prize money: $64,426

Singles
- Highest ranking: No. 155 (10 July 1995)

Grand Slam singles results
- Australian Open: Q1 (1996)
- French Open: Q2 (1995)
- Wimbledon: Q1 (1994)
- US Open: Q1 (1994, 1995)

Doubles
- Highest ranking: No. 287 (22 September 1997)

Federica Fortuni (born 30 September 1974) is an Italian former professional tennis player.

== Biography ==
Born in Rome, Fortuni played on the professional tour in the 1990s, reaching a best singles ranking of 155 in the world. She featured in the qualifying draws for all four Grand Slam tournaments during her career.

Fortuni, who had a win over top 50 player Miriam Oremans at the 1994 Italian Open, had her most successful run in a WTA Tour tournament at the 1995 Delray Beach Winter Championships, where she made the round of 16 as a lucky loser. A last minute replacement in the draw for sixth seed Mary Joe Fernandez, she benefited from a first round bye, then beat Christina Singer, before being eliminated by Barbara Rittner.

== ITF finals ==
$75,000 tournaments
$50,000 tournaments
$25,000 tournaments
$10,000 tournaments

=== Singles: 4 (1–3) ===
Outcome	No.	Date	Tournament	Surface	Opponent	Score
Runner-up	1.	7 March 1994	Prostějov, Czech Republic	Hard	(Netherlands) Kim de Weille	2–6, 6–7^{(4)}
Runner-up	2.	12 June 1995	Hebron, Spain	Clay	(Spain) Ángeles Montolio	6–7^{(5)}, 7–6^{(3)}, 4–6
Runner-up	3.	9 June 1997	Camucia, Italy	Hard	(Sweden) Sofia Finér	3–6, 1–6
Winner	1.	21 July 1997	Lido di Camaiore, Italy	Clay	(Czech Republic) Jana Lubasová	6–3, 4–6, 6–3

=== Doubles: 4 (4–0) ===
Outcome	No.	Date	Tournament	Surface	Partner	Opponents	Score
Winner	1.	30 March 1997	Dinard, France	Clay	(Italy) Germana Di Natale	(France) Magalie Lamarre (Sweden) Anna-Karin Svensson	6–4, 7–5
Winner	2.	21 July 1997	Lido di Camaiore, Italy	Clay	(Italy) Giulia Casoni	(Australia) Cindy Dock (Australia) Jenny-Anne Fetch	6–4, 6–1
Winner	3.	3 August 1997	Muri Antichi, Italy	Clay	(Italy) Giulia Casoni	(Ukraine) Natalia Bondarenko (Bulgaria) Biljana Pawlowa-Dimitrova	7–6, 6–2
Winner	4.	8 September 1997	Fano, Italy	Clay	(Romania) Andreea Ehritt-Vanc	(Australia) Jenny-Anne Fetch (Australia) Trudi Musgrave	6–1, 6–4
