= 1995 Brighton International =

- Date: 17–22 October
- Edition: 18th
- Category: Tier II
- Draw: 28S / 16D
- Prize money: $430,000
- Surface: Carpet (Supreme) / indoor
- Location: Brighton, England
- Venue: Brighton Centre

Champions

Singles
- (United States) Mary Joe Fernández

Doubles
- (United States) Meredith McGrath (Latvia) Larisa Savchenko
- Brighton International

The 1995 Brighton International was a women's tennis tournament played on indoor carpet courts at the Brighton Centre in Brighton, England that was part of the Tier II of the 1995 WTA Tour. It was the 18th, and last, edition of the tournament and was held from 17 October until 22 October 1995. Fourth-seeded Mary Joe Fernández, who entered on a wildcard, won the singles title at the event and earned $79,000 first-prize money.

== Finals ==
=== Singles ===
(United States) Mary Joe Fernández defeated (South Africa) Amanda Coetzer 6–4, 7–5

- It was Fernández' 2nd singles title of the year and the 6th of her career.

=== Doubles ===
(United States) Meredith McGrath / (Latvia) Larisa Savchenko defeated (United States) Lori McNeil / (Czech Republic) Helena Suková 7–5, 6–1

== Prize money ==
Event	W	F	SF	QF	Round of 16	Round of 32
Singles	$79,000	$35,000	$17,700	$9,325	$4,900	$2,570
