= 1995 Toshiba Classic =

- Date: July 31 – August 6
- Edition: 17th
- Category: Tier II
- Draw: 48S / 28D
- Prize money: $430,000
- Surface: Hard / outdoor
- Location: San Diego, California, U.S.
- Venue: La Costa Resort and Spa

Champions

Singles
- (Spain) Conchita Martínez

Doubles
- (United States) Gigi Fernández / (Belarus) Natasha Zvereva
- Southern California Open

The 1995 Toshiba Classic was a women's tennis tournament played on outdoor hard courts at the La Costa Resort and Spa in San Diego, California, United States that was part of Tier II of the 1995 WTA Tour. It was the 17th edition of the tournament and was held from July 31 through August 6, 1995. Second-seeded Conchita Martínez won the singles title and earned $79,5000 first-prize money.

== Finals ==
=== Singles ===
(Spain) Conchita Martínez defeated (United States) Lisa Raymond 6–2, 6–0

- It was Martínez's 5th singles title of the year and the 25th of her career.

=== Doubles ===
(United States) Gigi Fernández / (Belarus) Natasha Zvereva defeated (France) Alexia Dechaume-Balleret / (France) Sandrine Testud 6–2, 6–1

- It was Fernández's 5th title of the year and the 60th of her career. It was Zvereva's 4th title of the year and the 59th of her career.
