= 1995 Delray Beach Winter Championships – Singles =

Singles
- 1995 Delray Beach Winter Championships

Final
- Champion: (Germany) Steffi Graf
- Runner-up: (Spain) Conchita Martínez
- Score: 6–2, 6–4

Details
- Draw: 56
- Seeds: 16

Events
Singles	Doubles
← 1994 ·	Delray Beach Winter Championships

Steffi Graf was the defending champion and won in the final 6–2, 6–4 against Conchita Martínez.

== Seeds ==
A champion seed is indicated in bold text while text in italics indicates the round in which that seed was eliminated. The top nine seeds received a bye to the second round.

1. (Germany) **Steffi Graf (champion)**
2. (Spain) Conchita Martínez (final)
3. (Germany) Anke Huber (semifinals)
4. (Netherlands) Brenda Schultz (semifinals)
5. (Germany) Sabine Hack (second round)
6. n/a
7. (Romania) Irina Spîrlea (second round)
8. n/a
9. (France) Nathalie Tauziat (third round)
10. (United States) Marianne Werdel (second round)
11. (United States) Gigi Fernández (second round)
12. (Germany) Barbara Rittner (quarterfinals)
13. (Mexico) Angélica Gavaldón (third round)
14. n/a
15. (Chinese Taipei) Shi-Ting Wang (first round)
16. (Argentina) Florencia Labat (quarterfinals)

== Draw ==
=== Key ===
- Q = Qualifier
- WC = Wild card
- LL = Lucky loser
- Alt = Alternate
- SE = Special exempt
- PR = Protected ranking
- ITF = ITF entry
- JE = Junior exempt
- w/o = Walkover
- r = Retired
- d = Defaulted
- SR = Special ranking

=== Finals ===
Semifinals
1	(Germany) **Steffi Graf**	**6**	**6**
3	(Germany) Anke Huber	4	4
4	(Netherlands) Brenda Schultz	0^{r}
2	(Spain) **Conchita Martínez**	1

Final
1	(Germany) **Steffi Graf**	**6**	**6**
2	(Spain) Conchita Martínez	2	4

=== Top half ===
==== Section 1 ====
First round
(Canada) P Hy-Boulais	**6**	5	1
Q	(Spain) **M Sánchez Lorenzo**	1	**7**	**6**
(Australia) **K Radford**	5	**6**	**6**
(Netherlands) C Vis	**7**	4	1
(Australia) **N Bradtke**	**7**	**6**
15	(Chinese Taipei) S-T Wang	6	2
12	(Germany) **B Rittner**	**6**	**6**
Q	(Italy) E Savoldi	0	1
LL	(United Kingdom) C Wood	4	3
(United States) **N Arendt**	**6**	**6**
Q	(Georgia (country)) N Louarsabishvili	**7**	4	3
(Germany) **C Singer**	5	**6**	**6**

Second round
1	(Germany) **S Graf**	**6**	**6**
Q	(Spain) M Sánchez Lorenzo	1	4
(Australia) K Radford	4	0
(Australia) **N Bradtke**	**6**	**6**
12	(Germany) **B Rittner**	**6**	**6**
(United States) N Arendt	3	2
(Germany) C Singer	5	3
LL	(Italy) **F Fortuni**	**7**	**6**

Third round
1	(Germany) **S Graf**	**6**	**6**
(Australia) N Bradtke	4	1
12	(Germany) **B Rittner**	**6**	**6**
LL	(Italy) F Fortuni	3	4

Quarterfinals
1	(Germany) **S Graf**	**w/o**
12	(Germany) B Rittner

==== Section 2 ====
First round
(Slovakia) R Zrubáková	3	3
(Czech Republic) **R Bobková**	**6**	**6**
(Austria) B Schett	6	3
WC	(Chinese Taipei) **J Lee**	**7**	**6**
(Belarus) T Ignatieva	4	2
13	(Mexico) **A Gavaldón**	**6**	**6**
10	(United States) **M Werdel**	4	**6**	**6**
(Ukraine) N Medvedeva	**6**	4	1
(South Africa) E Reinach	4	5
(Russia) **E Likhovtseva**	**6**	**7**
(Italy) N Baudone	2	0
Q	(Venezuela) **M Vento**	**6**	**6**

Second round
3	(Germany) **A Huber**	**6**	**6**
(Czech Republic) R Bobková	4	3
WC	(Chinese Taipei) J Lee	2	5
13	(Mexico) **A Gavaldón**	**6**	**7**
10	(United States) M Werdel	3	4
(Russia) **E Likhovtseva**	**6**	**6**
Q	(Venezuela) **M Vento**	**7**	1	**6**
LL	(Thailand) T Tanasugarn	6	**6**	0

Third round
3	(Germany) **A Huber**	**6**	**7**
13	(Mexico) A Gavaldón	2	5
(Russia) **E Likhovtseva**	0	**6**	**6**
Q	(Venezuela) M Vento	**6**	3	2

Quarterfinals
3	(Germany) **A Huber**	**7**	**6**
(Russia) E Likhovtseva	6	4

=== Bottom half ===
==== Section 3 ====
First round
(Romania) **R Dragomir**	**6**	3	**7**
(Netherlands) M Bollegraf	1	**6**	6
WC	(United States) M Tu	5	1
(Australia) **R McQuillan**	**7**	**6**
LL	(Russia) T Panova	1	0
16	(Argentina) **F Labat**	**6**	**6**
11	(United States) **G Fernández**	**6**	**6**
(Italy) A Serra Zanetti	2	4
(Netherlands) **S Rottier**	**7**	**6**
(Slovakia) K Studeníková	6	3
(Japan) N Miyagi	**6**	2	0
(Japan) **A Sugiyama**	3	**6**	**6**

Second round
7	(Romania) I Spîrlea	1	2
(Romania) **R Dragomir**	**6**	**6**
(Australia) R McQuillan	3	**6**	3
16	(Argentina) **F Labat**	**6**	1	**6**
11	(United States) G Fernández	0	1
(Netherlands) **S Rottier**	**6**	**6**
(Japan) A Sugiyama	4	5
4	(Netherlands) **B Schultz**	**6**	**7**

Third round
(Romania) R Dragomir	4	3
16	(Argentina) **F Labat**	**6**	**6**
(Netherlands) S Rottier	**6**	6	4
4	(Netherlands) **B Schultz**	1	**7**	**6**

Quarterfinals
16	(Argentina) F Labat	**6**	3	6
4	(Netherlands) **B Schultz**	3	**6**	**7**

==== Section 4 ====
First round
(Japan) K Nagatsuka	**7**	4	2
(Netherlands) **K Boogert**	5	**6**	**6**
(United States) J Watanabe	3	4
(Germany) **K Kschwendt**	**6**	**6**
Q	(Italy) R Grande	6	2
9	(France) **N Tauziat**	**7**	**6**
LL	(Italy) **L Garrone**	**6**	3	**6**
(United States) L Harvey-Wild	3	**6**	3
Q	(Canada) **J Nejedly**	**6**	**6**
(France) S Testud	1	4
Q	(Spain) C Torrens Valero	**6**	1	6
Q	(Romania) **C Cristea**	4	**6**	**7**

Second round
5	(Germany) S Hack	0	5
(Netherlands) **K Boogert**	**6**	**7**
(Germany) K Kschwendt	2	3
9	(France) **N Tauziat**	**6**	**6**
LL	(Italy) L Garrone	2	0
Q	(Canada) **J Nejedly**	**6**	**6**
Q	(Romania) C Cristea	0	2
2	(Spain) **C Martínez**	**6**	**6**

Third round
(Netherlands) **K Boogert**	**6**	**7**
9	(France) N Tauziat	0	5
Q	(Canada) J Nejedly	0	2
2	(Spain) **C Martínez**	**6**	**6**

Quarterfinals
(Netherlands) K Boogert	4	6
2	(Spain) **C Martínez**	**6**	**7**
