= 1995 Prague Open =

- Date: 8–14 May
- Edition: 4th
- Category: Tier IV
- Draw: 32S / 32Q / 16D
- Prize money: $107,500
- Surface: Clay / outdoor
- Location: Prague, Czech Republic
- Venue: I. Czech Lawn Tennis Club

Champions

Singles
- (France) Julie Halard

Doubles
- (United States) Linda Harvey-Wild / (United States) Chanda Rubin
- WTA Prague Open

The 1995 Prague Open was a women's tennis tournament played on outdoor clay courts at the I. Czech Lawn Tennis Club in Prague in the Czech Republic that was part of Tier IV of the 1995 WTA Tour. The tournament was held from 8 May through 14 May 1995. First-seeded Julie Halard won the singles title.

== Finals ==
=== Singles ===
(France) Julie Halard defeated (Czech Republic) Ludmila Richterová 6–4, 6–4

- It was Halard's only singles title of the year and the 4th of her career.

=== Doubles ===
(United States) Linda Harvey-Wild / (United States) Chanda Rubin defeated (Sweden) Maria Lindström / (Sweden) Maria Strandlund 6–7, 6–3, 6–2

- It was Harvey-Wild's 1st title of the year and the 5th of her career. It was Rubin's only title of the year and the 3rd of her career.
