= 1995 Toshiba Classic – Doubles =

Doubles
- 1995 Toshiba Classic

Final
- Champions: (United States) Gigi Fernández (Belarus) Natasha Zvereva
- Runners-up: (France) Alexia Dechaume-Balleret (France) Sandrine Testud
- Score: 6–2, 6–1

Details
- Draw: 28
- Seeds: 8

Events
Singles	Doubles
- Toshiba Classic

Jana Novotná and Arantxa Sánchez Vicario were the defending champions but did not compete that year. Gigi Fernández and Natasha Zvereva won in the final 6–2, 6–1 against Alexia Dechaume-Balleret and Sandrine Testud.

== Seeds ==
Champion seeds are indicated in bold text while text in italics indicates the round in which those seeds were eliminated. The top four seeded teams received byes into the second round.

1. (United States) **Gigi Fernández** / (Belarus) **Natasha Zvereva (champions)**
2. (United States) Lindsay Davenport / (United States) Lisa Raymond (second round)
3. (Spain) Conchita Martínez / (Argentina) Patricia Tarabini (second round)
4. (France) Julie Halard / (France) Nathalie Tauziat (semifinals)
5. (Russia) Elena Makarova / (Russia) Eugenia Maniokova (second round)
6. (United States) Patty Fendick / (Canada) Jill Hetherington (quarterfinals)
7. (Ukraine) Natalia Medvedeva / (Latvia) Larisa Neiland (quarterfinals)
8. (Netherlands) Kristie Boogert / (United States) Chanda Rubin (second round)

== Draw ==
Key

- Q = Qualifier
- WC = Wild card
- LL = Lucky loser
- Alt = Alternate
- ITF = ITF entry
- PR = Protected ranking
- SR = Special ranking
- SE = Special exempt
- JE = Junior exempt
- JR = Junior Accelerator Programme entrant
- CO = College Accelerator Programme entrant
- NG = Next Gen Accelerator Program entrant
- w/o = Walkover
- r = Retired
- d = Defaulted

=== Final ===
Final

1
- (United States) **Gigi Fernández**
- (Belarus) **Natasha Zvereva**
**6**
**6**

- (France) Alexia Dechaume-Balleret
- (France) Sandrine Testud
2
1

=== Top half ===
First round

Second round

Quarterfinals

Semifinals

1
- (United States) **G Fernández**
- (Belarus) **N Zvereva**
**6**
**6**

- (Sweden) **Å Carlsson**
- (Japan) **A Sugiyama**
4
**6**
**6**

- (Sweden) Å Carlsson
- (Japan) A Sugiyama
2
2

- (United States) M Werdel-Witmeyer
- (United States) T Whitlinger-Jones
**6**
3
4

1
- (United States) **G Fernández**
- (Belarus) **N Zvereva**
**6**
**6**

- (United States) **E deLone**
- (United States) **A Keller**
**6**
**6**

- (United States) E deLone
- (United States) A Keller
2
1

- (United States) L Poruri
- (United States) M Tu
4
3

- (United States) **E deLone**
- (United States) **A Keller**
**7**
**7**

- (United States) A Bleszynski
- (United States) K Phebus
3
1

5
- (Russia) E Makarova
- (Russia) E Maniokova
6
5

5
- (Russia) **E Makarova**
- (Russia) **E Maniokova**
**6**
**6**

1
- (United States) **G Fernández**
- (Belarus) **N Zvereva**
**7**
**6**

- (Canada) P Hy-Boulais
- (South Africa) R Nideffer
6
2

3
- (Spain) C Martínez
- (Argentina) P Tarabini
4
2

- (Italy) R Grande
- (South Africa) J Kruger
**6**
2
5

- (Russia) **E Likhovtseva**
- (Germany) **C Singer**
**6**
**6**

- (Russia) **E Likhovtseva**
- (Germany) **C Singer**
4
**6**
**7**

- (Russia) E Likhovtseva
- (Germany) C Singer
**6**
6
4

- (United States) I Kurta
- (United States) A Lettiere
4
3

- (Canada) **P Hy-Boulais**
- (South Africa) **R Nideffer**
4
**7**
**6**

- (United States) **S Cacic**
- (United States) **J Watanabe**
**6**
**6**

- (United States) S Cacic
- (United States) J Watanabe
6
**6**
0

- (Canada) **P Hy-Boulais**
- (South Africa) **R Nideffer**
**7**
**6**

- (Canada) **P Hy-Boulais**
- (South Africa) **R Nideffer**
**7**
1
**6**

8
- (Netherlands) K Boogert
- (United States) C Rubin
5
4

=== Bottom half ===
First round

Second round

Quarterfinals

Semifinals

6
- (United States) **P Fendick**
- (Canada) **J Hetherington**
**6**
**6**

- (Australia) R McQuillan
- (Australia) K Radford
2
0

6
- (United States) **P Fendick**
- (Canada) **J Hetherington**
**6**
2
**6**

- (Germany) A Kerek
- (Slovakia) D Szabova
5
3

- (Finland) N Dahlman
- (United Kingdom) C Wood
3
**6**
4

- (Finland) **N Dahlman**
- (United Kingdom) **C Wood**
**7**
**6**

6
- (United States) P Fendick
- (Canada) J Hetherington
2
**6**
5

- (Mexico) A Gavaldón
- (United States) L Lee
0
5

4
- (France) **J Halard**
- (France) **N Tauziat**
**6**
4
**7**

- (United States) **S Stafford**
- (Netherlands) **C Vis**
**6**
**7**

- (United States) S Stafford
- (Netherlands) C Vis
3
1

4
- (France) **J Halard**
- (France) **N Tauziat**
**6**
**6**

4
- (France) J Halard
- (France) N Tauziat
3
3

7
- (Ukraine) **N Medvedeva**
- (Latvia) **L Neiland**
**6**
**6**

- (France) **A Dechaume-Balleret**
- (France) **S Testud**
**6**
**6**

- (Argentina) M-J Gaidano
- (Argentina) P Suárez
1
1

7
- (Ukraine) **N Medvedeva**
- (Latvia) **L Neiland**
**6**
4
**6**

- (Ukraine) E Brioukhovets
- (Georgia (country)) N Louarsabishvili
4
1

- (Romania) C Cristea
- (United States) D Scott
2
**6**
3

- (Romania) **C Cristea**
- (United States) **D Scott**
**6**
**6**

7
- (Ukraine) N Medvedeva
- (Latvia) L Neiland
2
3

- (France) **A Dechaume-Balleret**
- (France) **S Testud**
**7**
**6**

- (France) **A Dechaume-Balleret**
- (France) **S Testud**
**6**
**6**

- (Germany) A Barna
- (Luxembourg) A Kremer
5
1

- (France) **A Dechaume-Balleret**
- (France) **S Testud**
**6**
**6**

2
- (United States) L Davenport
- (United States) L Raymond
0
3
