= 1995 Brighton International – Singles =

Singles
- 1995 Brighton International

Final
- Champion: (United States) Mary Joe Fernández
- Runner-up: (South Africa) Amanda Coetzer
- Score: 6–4, 7–5

Details
- Draw: 28
- Seeds: 8

Events
Singles	Doubles
← 1994 ·	Brighton International

Jana Novotná was the defending champion, but lost in second round to Miriam Oremans.

Mary Joe Fernández won the title by defeating Amanda Coetzer 6–4, 7–5 in the final.

== Seeds ==
The first four seeds received a bye into the second round.

1. (Germany) Steffi Graf (second round)
2. (Czech Republic) Jana Novotná (second round)
3. (Bulgaria) Magdalena Maleeva (semifinals)
4. (United States) Mary Joe Fernández (champion)
5. (France) Nathalie Tauziat (first round)
6. (Czech Republic) Helena Suková (quarterfinals)
7. (South Africa) Amanda Coetzer (final)
8. (Romania) Irina Spîrlea (second round)

== Draw ==
=== Key ===
- Q = Qualifier
- WC = Wild card
- LL = Lucky loser
- Alt = Alternate
- SE = Special exempt
- PR = Protected ranking
- ITF = ITF entry
- JE = Junior exempt
- w/o = Walkover
- r = Retired
- d = Defaulted
- SR = Special ranking

=== Finals ===
Semifinals
(Netherlands) Kristie Boogert	6	1	3
4/WC	(United States) Mary Joe Fernández	3	6	6
3	(Bulgaria) Magdalena Maleeva	3	3
7	(South Africa) Amanda Coetzer	6	6

Final
4/WC	(United States) Mary Joe Fernández	6	7
7	(South Africa) Amanda Coetzer	4	5

=== Top half ===
First round
Q	(United States) K Adams	4	4
Q	(South Africa) M de Swardt	6	6
(France) J Halard-Decugis	5	7^{7}	3
(Netherlands) K Boogert	7	6^{5}	6
(Belgium) S Appelmans	6	6
5	(France) N Tauziat	0	1
(Germany) J Kandarr	2	4
Q	(Poland) K Nowak	6	6
(Austria) B Paulus	6	7^{10}
(South Africa) J Kruger	0	6^{8}
(Russia) E Likhovtseva	1	3
8	(Romania) I Spîrlea	6	6

Second round
1	(Germany) S Graf	2	6	1
Q	(South Africa) M de Swardt	6	4	6
(Netherlands) K Boogert	6	6
(Belgium) S Appelmans	3	4
4/WC	(United States) MJ Fernández	6	6
Q	(Poland) K Nowak	1	1
(Austria) B Paulus	7^{7}	6
8	(Romania) I Spîrlea	6^{5}	4

Quarterfinals
Q	(South Africa) M de Swardt	1	6	4
(Netherlands) K Boogert	6	1	6
4/WC	(United States) MJ Fernández	3	7	6
(Austria) B Paulus	6	5	3

Semifinals
(Netherlands) K Boogert	6	1	3
4/WC	(United States) MJ Fernández	3	6	6

=== Bottom half ===
First round
6	(Czech Republic) H Suková	6	6^{4}	7^{7}
(United States) L McNeil	3	7^{7}	6^{3}
(Slovakia) K Habšudová	2	7^{7}	0
WC	(United Kingdom) C Wood	6	6^{5}	6
(Germany) B Rittner	6	7
(Romania) R Dragomir	3	5
7	(South Africa) A Coetzer	6^{6}	6	6
LL	(United States) N Arendt	7^{8}	3	0
Q	(United Kingdom) S Smith	6	6^{6}	2
(Sweden) Å Carlsson	3	7^{8}	6
(Bulgaria) K Maleeva	5	1
(Netherlands) M Oremans	7	6

Second round
6	(Czech Republic) H Suková	6	7^{7}
WC	(United Kingdom) C Wood	2	6^{4}
(Germany) B Rittner	6	4	1
3	(Bulgaria) M Maleeva	1	6	6
7	(South Africa) A Coetzer	6	6
(Sweden) Å Carlsson	2	3
(Netherlands) M Oremans	6	6
2	(Czech Republic) J Novotná	4	0

Quarterfinals
6	(Czech Republic) H Suková	6	1	3
3	(Bulgaria) M Maleeva	1	6	6
7	(South Africa) A Coetzer	4	6	7
(Netherlands) M Oremans	6	4	5

Semifinals
3	(Bulgaria) M Maleeva	3	3
7	(South Africa) A Coetzer	6	6
