= 1995 Prague Open – Singles =

Singles
- 1995 Prague Open

Final
- Champion: (France) Julie Halard
- Runner-up: (Czech Republic) Ludmila Richterová
- Score: 6–4, 6–4

Details
- Draw: 32
- Seeds: 8

Events
Singles	Doubles
- Prague Open

Amanda Coetzer was the defending champion but did not compete that year.

Julie Halard won in the final 6–4, 6–4 against Ludmila Richterová.

== Seeds ==
A champion seed is indicated in bold text while text in italics indicates the round in which that seed was eliminated.

1. (France) **Julie Halard (champion)**
2. (Bulgaria) Katerina Maleeva (first round)
3. (United States) Chanda Rubin (first round)
4. (United States) Linda Harvey-Wild (first round)
5. (Sweden) Åsa Carlsson (quarterfinals)
6. (Germany) Silke Meier (second round)
7. (France) Lea Ghirardi (first round)
8. (Netherlands) Stephanie Rottier (semifinals)

== Draw ==
Key

- Q = Qualifier
- WC = Wild card
- LL = Lucky loser
- Alt = Alternate
- ITF = ITF entry
- PR = Protected ranking
- SR = Special ranking
- SE = Special exempt
- JE = Junior exempt
- JR = Junior Accelerator Programme entrant
- CO = College Accelerator Programme entrant
- NG = Next Gen Accelerator Program entrant
- w/o = Walkover
- r = Retired
- d = Defaulted

First round
1	(France) **J Halard**	**6**	**6**
LL	(Czech Republic) E Martincová	1	0
(Sweden) **M Strandlund**	**6**	**6**
(Germany) M Kochta	2	4
(Czech Republic) L Němečková	4	4
WC	(Czech Republic) **D Chládková**	**6**	**6**
(Australia) K Godridge	6	4
5	(Sweden) **Å Carlsson**	**7**	**6**
4	(United States) L Harvey-Wild	6	3
Q	(Czech Republic) **R Pelikánová**	**7**	**6**
(France) S Pitkowski	4	3
WC	(Czech Republic) **S Kleinová**	**6**	**6**
Q	(Czech Republic) J Lubasova	2	1
(Argentina) **P Suárez**	**6**	**6**
(Slovakia) **K Studeníková**	4	**6**	**6**
7	(France) L Ghirardi	**6**	3	3
6	(Germany) **S Meier**	4	**6**	**6**
Q	(Finland) P Thorén	**6**	4	1
(France) N van Lottum	3	0
(Hungary) **A Temesvári**	**6**	**6**
(Czech Republic) **P Langrová**	**6**	**6**
(France) A Fusai	1	2
(Czech Republic) **L Richterová**	3	**6**	**7**
3	(United States) C Rubin	**6**	4	6
8	(Netherlands) **S Rottier**	**6**	**6**
Q	(Chinese Taipei) J Lee	0	2
(Finland) N Dahlman	1	2
(Spain) **N Ávila Bonastre**	**6**	**6**
(Austria) **B Schett**	**7**	**6**
(United States) K Po	5	0
(Germany) **V Martinek**	**6**	0	**6**
2	(Bulgaria) K Maleeva	4	**6**	2

Second round
1	(France) **J Halard**	**7**	**6**
(Sweden) M Strandlund	5	1
WC	(Czech Republic) D Chládková	2	0
5	(Sweden) **Å Carlsson**	**6**	**6**
Q	(Czech Republic) R Pelikánová	3	**6**	2
WC	(Czech Republic) **S Kleinová**	**6**	2	**6**
(Argentina) P Suárez	4	4
(Slovakia) **K Studeníková**	**6**	**6**
6	(Germany) S Meier	3	**6**	2
(Hungary) **A Temesvári**	**6**	3	**6**
(Czech Republic) P Langrová	**6**	6	6
(Czech Republic) **L Richterová**	3	**7**	**7**
8	(Netherlands) **S Rottier**	**6**	**7**
(Spain) N Ávila Bonastre	3	6
(Austria) **B Schett**	**6**	**6**
(Germany) V Martinek	2	1

Quarterfinals
1	(France) **J Halard**	5	**6**	**6**
5	(Sweden) Å Carlsson	**7**	2	3
WC	(Czech Republic) S Kleinová	4	**7**	3
(Slovakia) **K Studeníková**	**6**	5	**6**
(Hungary) A Temesvári	3	6
(Czech Republic) **L Richterová**	**6**	**7**
8	(Netherlands) **S Rottier**	**6**	4	**6**
(Austria) B Schett	3	**6**	3

Semifinals
1	(France) **J Halard**	**6**	**6**
(Slovakia) K Studeníková	4	1
(Czech Republic) **L Richterová**	**6**	**6**
8	(Netherlands) S Rottier	4	0

Final
1	(France) **Julie Halard**	**6**	**6**
(Czech Republic) Ludmila Richterová	4	4
