= 1995 Toshiba Classic – Singles =

Singles
- 1995 Toshiba Classic
- 1994 Champion: (Germany) Steffi Graf

Final
- Champion: (Spain) Conchita Martínez
- Runner-up: (United States) Lisa Raymond
- Score: 6–2, 6–0

Details
- Draw: 48
- Seeds: 16

Events
Singles	Doubles
- Toshiba Classic

Conchita Martínez defeated Lisa Raymond in the final 6–2, 6–0, to win the women's singles tennis event at the 1995 Toshiba Classic.

Steffi Graf was the defending champion but did not compete that year.

== Seeds ==
A champion seed is indicated in bold text while text in italics indicates the round in which that seed was eliminated. All eighteen seeds received a bye to the second round.

1. (Spain) Arantxa Sánchez Vicario (third round)
2. (Spain) **Conchita Martínez (champion)**
3. (France) Mary Pierce (semifinals)
4. n/a
5. n/a
6. (Belarus) Natasha Zvereva (second round)
7. (France) Nathalie Tauziat (second round)
8. (United States) Chanda Rubin (second round)
9. (United States) Lisa Raymond (final)
10. (South Africa) Amanda Coetzer (second round)
11. (United States) Marianne Werdel-Witmeyer (quarterfinals)
12. n/a
13. (Russia) Elena Likhovtseva (second round)
14. (Mexico) Angélica Gavaldón (second round)
15. (South Africa) Joannette Kruger (third round)
16. (United States) Gigi Fernández (quarterfinals)
17. (United States) Tami Whitlinger-Jones (second round)
18. (Germany) Christina Singer (third round)

== Draw ==
Key

- Q = Qualifier
- WC = Wild card
- LL = Lucky loser
- Alt = Alternate
- ITF = ITF entry
- PR = Protected ranking
- SR = Special ranking
- SE = Special exempt
- JE = Junior exempt
- JR = Junior Accelerator Programme entrant
- CO = College Accelerator Programme entrant
- NG = Next Gen Accelerator Program entrant
- w/o = Walkover
- r = Retired
- d = Defaulted

=== Finals ===
Semifinals
(France) Sandrine Testud	4	3
9	(United States) **Lisa Raymond**	**6**	**6**
3	(France) Mary Pierce	1	3
2	(Spain) **Conchita Martínez**	**6**	**6**

Final
9	(United States) Lisa Raymond	2	0
2	(Spain) **Conchita Martínez**	**6**	**6**

=== Top half ===
==== Section 1 ====
First round
(United States) A Grossman	4	5
(Canada) **P Hy-Boulais**	**6**	**7**
Q	(Finland) N Dahlman	2	1
(United States) **J Watanabe**	**6**	**6**
Q	(United States) M Tu	2	**6**	2
Q	(Italy) **R Grande**	**6**	3	**6**
(France) **S Testud**	**6**	**6**
Q	(Netherlands) C Vis	3	2

Second round
1	(Spain) **A Sánchez Vicario**	**6**	2	**6**
(Canada) P Hy-Boulais	2	**6**	2
(United States) J Watanabe	**6**	4	4
11	(United States) **M Werdel-Witmeyer**	3	**6**	**6**
13	(Russia) E Likhovtseva	**7**	3	1
Q	(Italy) **R Grande**	5	**6**	**6**
(France) **S Testud**	**6**	**6**
6	(Belarus) N Zvereva	3	4

Third round
1	(Spain) A Sánchez Vicario	3	**6**	2
11	(United States) **M Werdel-Witmeyer**	**6**	2	**6**
Q	(Italy) R Grande	2	4
(France) **S Testud**	**6**	**6**

Quarterfinals
11	(United States) M Werdel-Witmeyer	2	2
(France) **S Testud**	**6**	**6**

==== Section 2 ====
First round
(France) A Dechaume-Balleret	5	2
(Italy) **N Baudone**	**7**	**6**
(United States) P Fendick	2	5
(Canada) **J Nejedly**	**6**	**7**
Q	(United States) K Phebus	6	5
(United States) **S Stafford**	**7**	**7**
(Japan) K Shibata	5	5
Q	(United States) **L Lee**	**7**	**7**

Second round
18	(Germany) **C Singer**	**6**	3	**6**
(Italy) N Baudone	4	**6**	3
(Canada) J Nejedly	3	1
16	(United States) **G Fernández**	**6**	**6**
9	(United States) **L Raymond**	**6**	**6**
(United States) S Stafford	1	2
Q	(United States) **L Lee**	2	**7**	**6**
8	(United States) C Rubin	**6**	5	3

Third round
18	(Germany) C Singer	6	4
16	(United States) **G Fernández**	**7**	**6**
9	(United States) **L Raymond**	**6**	**6**
Q	(United States) L Lee	4	2

Quarterfinals
16	(United States) G Fernández	3	**6**	3
9	(United States) **L Raymond**	**6**	4	**6**

=== Bottom half ===
==== Section 3 ====
First round
(United States) P Shriver	3	5
(Australia) **R McQuillan**	**6**	**7**
(United States) **S Cacic**	**6**	5	**6**
WC	(Australia) R Stubbs	2	**7**	4
(Ukraine) **N Medvedeva**	**6**	**6**
WC	(South Africa) R Nideffer	3	3
(Italy) A Serra Zanetti	3	2
LL	(United States) **E deLone**	**6**	**6**

Second round
7	(France) N Tauziat	2	4
(Australia) **R McQuillan**	**6**	**6**
(United States) **S Cacic**	**6**	**6**
14	(Mexico) A Gavaldón	3	3
15	(South Africa) **J Kruger**	**6**	**6**
(Ukraine) N Medvedeva	3	3
LL	(United States) E deLone	0	3
3	(France) **M Pierce**	**6**	**6**

Third round
(Australia) **R McQuillan**	**6**	**7**
(United States) S Cacic	4	6
15	(South Africa) J Kruger	2	0
3	(France) **M Pierce**	**6**	**6**

Quarterfinals
(Australia) R McQuillan	2	4
3	(France) **M Pierce**	**6**	**6**

==== Section 4 ====
First round
LL	(United States) A Keller	1	1
(Netherlands) **K Boogert**	**6**	**6**
Q	(Italy) F Lubiani	5	5
(Sweden) **Å Carlsson**	**7**	**7**
(Japan) **A Sugiyama**	**6**	**7**
Q	(Canada) S Jeyaseelan	0	6
(Romania) C Cristea	4	5
(Austria) **B Reinstadler**	**6**	**7**

Second round
LL	(Argentina) M-J Gaidano	4	**6**	2
(Netherlands) **K Boogert**	**6**	2	**6**
(Sweden) **Å Carlsson**	**7**	2	**7**
17	(United States) T Whitlinger-Jones	6	**6**	6
10	(South Africa) A Coetzer	5	0
(Japan) **A Sugiyama**	**7**	**6**
(Austria) B Reinstadler	**6**	2	3
2	(Spain) **C Martínez**	4	**6**	**6**

Third round
(Netherlands) K Boogert	2	4
(Sweden) **Å Carlsson**	**6**	**6**
(Japan) A Sugiyama	**6**	2	3
2	(Spain) **C Martínez**	4	**6**	**6**

Quarterfinals
(Sweden) Å Carlsson	0	1
2	(Spain) **C Martínez**	**6**	**6**
