= 1995 Brighton International – Doubles =

Doubles
- 1995 Brighton International

Final
- Champions: (United States) Meredith McGrath (Latvia) Larisa Neiland
- Runners-up: (United States) Lori McNeil (Czech Republic) Helena Suková
- Score: 7–5, 6–1

Details
- Draw: 16
- Seeds: 4

Events
| Singles | Doubles |
| ← 1994 · | Brighton International |

Manon Bollegraf and Larisa Neiland were the defending champions, but competed this year with different partners.

Bollegraf teamed up with Nicole Arendt and lost in quarterfinals to Maria Lindström and Maria Strandlund.

Neiland teamed up with Meredith McGrath and successfully defended her title, by defeating Lori McNeil and Helena Suková 7–5, 6–1 in the final.

== Seeds ==
1. (United States) Meredith McGrath / (Latvia) Larisa Neiland (champions)
2. (United States) Nicole Arendt / (Netherlands) Manon Bollegraf (quarterfinals)
3. (United States) Lori McNeil / (Czech Republic) Helena Suková (final)
4. (Netherlands) Kristie Boogert / (United States) Mary Joe Fernández (semifinals)

== Draw ==
=== Key ===
- Q = Qualifier
- WC = Wild card
- LL = Lucky loser
- Alt = Alternate
- SE = Special exempt
- PR = Protected ranking
- ITF = ITF entry
- JE = Junior exempt
- w/o = Walkover
- r = Retired
- d = Defaulted
- SR = Special ranking

=== Draw ===
First round
1 | (United States) M McGrath (Latvia) L Neiland | 6 | 6
(Belgium) S Appelmans (Netherlands) M Oremans | 3 | 0
(Romania) R Dragomir (Germany) W Probst | 7 | 6
WC | (United Kingdom) J Durie (United Kingdom) C Wood | 6 | 1
4 | (Netherlands) K Boogert (United States) MJ Fernández | 2 | 7 | 6
(Sweden) Å Carlsson (Finland) N Dahlman | 6 | 6 | 1
(Slovakia) K Habšudová (Bulgaria) K Maleeva | 0 | 5
(United States) K Adams (Romania) I Spîrlea | 6 | 7
(France) J Halard (France) N Tauziat | 2 | 6 | 6
(Belgium) L Courtois (Belgium) N Feber | 6 | 3 | 3
(Russia) E Likhovtseva (Germany) C Schneider | 2 | 6
3 | (United States) L McNeil (Czech Republic) H Suková | 6 | 7
(Sweden) M Lindström (Sweden) M Strandlund | 6 | 6
(Czech Republic) R Bobková (Czech Republic) H Vildová | 4 | 4
Q | (South Africa) J Kruger (Germany) B Rittner | 6 | 0
2 | (United States) N Arendt (Netherlands) M Bollegraf | 7 | 6

Quarterfinals
1 | (United States) M McGrath (Latvia) L Neiland | 6 | 6
(Romania) R Dragomir (Germany) W Probst | 0 | 1
4 | (Netherlands) K Boogert (United States) MJ Fernández | 7 | 7
(United States) K Adams (Romania) I Spîrlea | 5 | 6
(France) J Halard (France) N Tauziat | 1 | 2
3 | (United States) L McNeil (Czech Republic) H Suková | 6 | 6
(Sweden) M Lindström (Sweden) M Strandlund | 2 | 6 | 6
2 | (United States) N Arendt (Netherlands) M Bollegraf | 6 | 4 | 3

Semifinals
1 | (United States) M McGrath (Latvia) L Neiland | 6 | 4 | 6
4 | (Netherlands) K Boogert (United States) MJ Fernández | 1 | 6 | 4
3 | (United States) L McNeil (Czech Republic) H Suková | 7 | 6
(Sweden) M Lindström (Sweden) M Strandlund | 5 | 3

Final
1 | (United States) M McGrath (Latvia) L Neiland | 7 | 6
3 | (United States) L McNeil (Czech Republic) H Suková | 5 | 1
