= 1995 Prague Open – Doubles =

Doubles
- 1995 Prague Open

Final
- Champions: (United States) Linda Harvey-Wild (United States) Chanda Rubin
- Runners-up: (Sweden) Maria Lindström (Sweden) Maria Strandlund
- Score: 6–7, 6–3, 6–2

Details
- Draw: 16
- Seeds: 4

Events
Singles	Doubles
- Prague Open

Amanda Coetzer and Linda Harvey-Wild were the defending champions but only Harvey-Wild competed that year with Chanda Rubin.

Harvey-Wild and Rubin won in the final 6–7, 6–3, 6–2 against Maria Lindström and Maria Strandlund.

== Seeds ==
Champion seeds are indicated in bold text while text in italics indicates the round in which those seeds were eliminated.

1. (United States) **Linda Harvey-Wild** / (United States) **Chanda Rubin (champions)**
2. (Sweden) Maria Lindström / (Sweden) Maria Strandlund (final)
3. (Sweden) Åsa Carlsson / (France) Alexandra Fusai (first round)
4. (Australia) Catherine Barclay / (Australia) Kristin Godridge (semifinals)

== Draw ==
Key

- Q = Qualifier
- WC = Wild card
- LL = Lucky loser
- Alt = Alternate
- ITF = ITF entry
- PR = Protected ranking
- SR = Special ranking
- SE = Special exempt
- JE = Junior exempt
- JR = Junior Accelerator Programme entrant
- CO = College Accelerator Programme entrant
- NG = Next Gen Accelerator Program entrant
- w/o = Walkover
- r = Retired
- d = Defaulted

First round
1	(United States) **L Harvey-Wild** (United States) **C Rubin**	**6**	**6**
(Czech Republic) P Kučová (Czech Republic) L Němečková	4	3
(South Africa) **L Horn** (United States) **J Steven**	**6**	**7**
Q	(Argentina) M-F Landa (Argentina) P Suárez	4	5
3	(Sweden) Å Carlsson (France) A Fusai	**6**	4	2
(Poland) **M Mroz** (Czech Republic) **H Vildová**	2	**6**	**6**
(Slovakia) **K Studeníková** (Hungary) **A Temesvári**	3	**6**	**6**
(Czech Republic) L Richterová (Ukraine) E Tatarkova	**6**	1	0
(Finland) N Dahlman (Finland) P Thorén	2	3
(Czech Republic) **E Martincová** (Czech Republic) **J Pospíšilová**	**6**	**6**
(France) L Ghirardi (France) S Pitkowski	3	1
4	(Australia) **C Barclay** (Australia) **K Godridge**	**6**	**6**
WC	(Czech Republic) D Chládková (Czech Republic) S Kleinová	3	**6**	3
(Czech Republic) **P Langrová** (France) **N van Lottum**	**6**	4	**6**
(United States) K Po (France) K Quentrec-Eagle	4	**6**	6
2	(Sweden) **M Lindström** (Sweden) **M Strandlund**	**6**	3	**7**

Quarterfinals
1	(United States) **L Harvey-Wild** (United States) **C Rubin**	**6**	**6**
(South Africa) L Horn (United States) J Steven	4	0
(Poland) **M Mroz** (Czech Republic) **H Vildová**	0	**7**	**6**
(Slovakia) K Studeníková (Hungary) A Temesvári	**6**	6	2
(Czech Republic) E Martincová (Czech Republic) J Pospíšilová	3	1
4	(Australia) **C Barclay** (Australia) **K Godridge**	**6**	**6**
(Czech Republic) P Langrová (France) N van Lottum	3	6
2	(Sweden) **M Lindström** (Sweden) **M Strandlund**	**6**	**7**

Semifinals
1	(United States) **L Harvey-Wild** (United States) **C Rubin**	**w/o**
(Poland) M Mroz (Czech Republic) H Vildová
4	(Australia) C Barclay (Australia) K Godridge	5	3
2	(Sweden) **M Lindström** (Sweden) **M Strandlund**	**7**	**6**

Final
1	(United States) **Linda Harvey-Wild** (United States) **Chanda Rubin**	6	**6**	**6**
2	(Sweden) Maria Lindström (Sweden) Maria Strandlund	**7**	3	2
