= 1995 Delray Beach Winter Championships =

- Date: March 6–12
- Edition: 17th
- Category: Tier II
- Draw: 56S / 28D
- Prize money: $430,000
- Surface: Hard / outdoor
- Location: Delray Beach, Florida, U.S.
- Venue: Delray Beach Tennis Center

Champions

Singles
- (Germany) Steffi Graf

Doubles
- (United States) Mary Joe Fernández / (Czech Republic) Jana Novotná
← 1994 ·	Virginia Slims of Florida

The 1995 Delray Beach Winter Championships was a women's tennis tournament played on outdoor hard courts at the Delray Beach Tennis Center in Delray Beach, Florida in the United States that was part of Tier II of the 1995 WTA Tour. It was the 17th edition of the tournament and was held from March 6 through March 12, 1995. First-seeded Steffi Graf won the singles title.

== Finals ==
=== Singles ===
(Germany) Steffi Graf defeated (Spain) Conchita Martínez 6–2, 6–4

- It was Graf's 2nd singles title of the year and the 88th of her career.

=== Doubles ===
(United States) Mary Joe Fernández / (Czech Republic) Jana Novotná defeated (United States) Lori McNeil / (Latvia) Larisa Savchenko 6–4, 6–0

- It was Fernández's 2nd title of the year and the 15th of her career. It was Novotná's 4th title of the year and the 67th of her career.
