= TVA Cup =

Defunct tennis tournament
- Event name: TVA Cup
- Tour: WTA Tour
- Founded: 1995
- Abolished: 1995
- Editions: 1
- Location: Nagoya, Japan
- Venue: Aichi Prefectural Gymnasium
- Surface: Carpet / indoor

The TVA Cup is a defunct WTA Tour affiliated tennis tournament played in 1995. It was held at the Aichi Prefectural Gymnasium in Nagoya in Japan and was played on indoor carpet courts.

== Results ==
=== Singles ===
Year	Champions	Runners-up	Score
1995	(United States) Linda Wild	(Czech Republic) Sandra Kleinová	6–4, 6–2

=== Doubles ===
Year	Champions	Runners-up	Score
1995	(Australia) Kerry-Anne Guse (Australia) Kristine Radford	(Japan) Rika Hiraki (South Korea) Sung-Hee Park	6–4, 6–4
