= Laxmi Poruri =

American tennis player

- Full name: Laxmi Poruri-Madan
- Country (sports): United States
- Born: November 9, 1972 (age 53) Guntur, India
- Prize money: US$ 163,239

Singles
- Career record: 102–91
- Highest ranking: No. 110 (February 5, 1996)

Grand Slam singles results
- Australian Open: 2R (1996)
- US Open: 2R (1988, 1989)

Doubles
- Career record: 34–33
- Highest ranking: No. 85 (April 24, 1995)

Grand Slam doubles results
- Australian Open: 1R (1996)
- French Open: 1R (1995, 1996)
- Wimbledon: 1R (1995)
- US Open: 1R (1995, 1996)

Laxmi Poruri-Madan (born November 9, 1972) is a retired American professional tennis player and the first Indian-American female to play professional tennis on the WTA Tour in the modern era.

== Early life and education ==
Poruri was born in Guntur, India and raised in Central California where, from a very young age, she was known as a tennis prodigy. In 1986, she won the Orange Bowl, beating Monica Seles in the final. At age 15, she played her first US Open where she lost to Katerina Maleeva in the 2nd round. She attended Stanford University from 1990 to 1994 on a full athletic scholarship, where she was a four-time All-American athlete, the 1994 Player of the Year, and the top-ranked women's collegiate tennis player in the country.

== Career ==
After graduating from Stanford, Poruri played professional tennis for several years. Upon retiring from professional tennis, Poruri taught English for a year in Boston, MA. Poruri then attended McGill University in Canada, where she received her MBA. Poruri worked on Wall Street for two years before returning to California in 2004.

== Personal life ==
As of 2015, she resides in Austin, TX with her husband, Ajay Madan, a corporate and securities lawyer, and daughter.
