= 2007 Internazionali Femminili di Palermo =

- Date: 16–22 July
- Edition: 20th
- Category: WTA Tier IV
- Draw: 32S / 16D
- Prize money: $145,000
- Surface: Clay / outdoor
- Location: Palermo, Italy

Champions

Singles
- (Hungary) Ágnes Szávay

Doubles
- (Ukraine) Mariya Koryttseva / (Belarus) Darya Kustova
← 2006 ·	Internazionali Femminili di Palermo	· 2008 →

The 2007 Internazionali Femminili di Palermo was a women's tennis tournament played on outdoor clay courts. It was the 20th edition of the Internazionali Femminili di Palermo, and was part of the WTA Tier IV tournaments of the 2007 WTA Tour. It was held in Palermo, Italy, from 16 July until 22 July 2007. Eighth-seeded Ágnes Szávay won the title.

== Points and prize money ==
=== Point distribution ===
Event	W	F	SF	QF	Round of 16	Round of 32	Q	Q3	Q2	Q1
Singles	115	80	50	30	15	1	7	3	2	1
Doubles	115	80	50	30	1	—	—	—	—	—

=== Prize money ===
Event	W	F	SF	QF	Round of 16	Round of 32	Q3	Q2	Q1
Singles	$21,140	$11,395	$6,140	$3,310	$1,775	$955	$515	$280	$165
Doubles *	$6,240	$3,360	$1,810	$970	$525	—	—	—	—

_{* per team}

== Singles main draw entrants ==
=== Seeds ===
Country	Player	Rank	Seed
NED	Michaëlla Krajicek	32	1
GER	Martina Müller	33	2
POL	Agnieszka Radwańska	36	3
FRA	Émilie Loit	37	4
ITA	Roberta Vinci	44	5
FRA	Aravane Rezaï	50	6
EST	Kaia Kanepi	51	7
HUN	Ágnes Szávay	53	8

=== Other entrants ===
The following players received wildcards into the singles main draw:

- (Italy) Silvia Disderi
- (Italy) Sara Errani
- (Italy) Antonella Serra Zanetti

The following players received entry from the qualifying draw:

- (Romania) Sorana Cîrstea
- (Slovenia) Andreja Klepač
- (Romania) Raluca Olaru
- (Czech Republic) Klára Zakopalová

The following players received entries as lucky losers:

- (Spain) Conchita Martínez Granados
- (Russia) Ekaterina Ivanova
- (Spain) María José Martínez Sánchez

== Doubles main draw entrants ==
=== Seeds ===
Country	Player	Country	Player	Rank	Seed
ITA	Maria Elena Camerin	FRA	Émilie Loit	98	1
ESP	Lourdes Domínguez Lino	ITA	Flavia Pennetta	107	2
CZE	Eva Birnerová	NED	Michaëlla Krajicek	130	3
POL	Klaudia Jans	POL	Alicja Rosolska	151	4

=== Other entrants ===
The following pairs received wildcards into the doubles main draw:

- (Italy) Alice Canepa / (Italy) Karin Knapp

== Finals ==
=== Singles ===
(Hungary) Ágnes Szávay defeated (Germany) Martina Müller, 6–0, 6–1

=== Doubles ===
(Ukraine) Mariya Koryttseva / (Belarus) Darya Kustova defeated (Italy) Alice Canepa / (Italy) Karin Knapp, 6–4, 6–1
