= 2009 Internazionali Femminili di Palermo – Doubles =

Doubles
- 2009 Internazionali Femminili di Palermo

Final
- Champions: (Spain) Nuria Llagostera Vives (Spain) María José Martínez Sánchez
- Runners-up: (Ukraine) Mariya Koryttseva (Belarus) Darya Kustova
- Score: 6–1, 6–2

Details
- Draw: 16
- Seeds: 4

Events
Singles	Doubles
← 2008 ·	Internazionali Femminili di Palermo	· 2010 →

Sara Errani and Nuria Llagostera Vives were the defending champions. Both were present that year, but chose to compete with different partners.
Errani partnered with Lourdes Domínguez Lino, but lost in the quarterfinals to Nuria Llagostera Vives and María José Martínez Sánchez.
Llagostera Vives, partnered with Martínez Sánchez, defeated Mariya Koryttseva and Darya Kustova in the final, 6–1, 6–2.

== Seeds ==
1. (Germany) Anna-Lena Grönefeld / (Switzerland) Patty Schnyder (first round)
2. (Spain) Nuria Llagostera Vives / (Spain) María José Martínez Sánchez (champions)
3. (Russia) Ekaterina Makarova / (Kazakhstan) Galina Voskoboeva (first round)
4. (Turkey) İpek Şenoğlu / (Kazakhstan) Yaroslava Shvedova (first round)

== Draw ==
=== Key ===
- Q = Qualifier
- WC = Wild card
- LL = Lucky loser
- Alt = Alternate
- SE = Special exempt
- PR = Protected ranking
- ITF = ITF entry
- JE = Junior exempt
- w/o = Walkover
- r = Retired
- d = Defaulted
- SR = Special ranking

=== Draw ===
First round
1	(Germany) A-L Grönefeld (Switzerland) P Schnyder	4	6	[9]
(Romania) I-C Begu (Spain) M Marrero	6	4	[11]
(Ukraine) M Koryttseva (Belarus) D Kustova	6	6
(Russia) A Jidkova (Belarus) T Poutchek	1	2
4	(Turkey) İ Şenoğlu (Kazakhstan) Y Shvedova	3	6	[7]
(Spain) A Parra Santonja (Czech Republic) V Uhlířová	6	4	[10]
(Italy) F Pennetta (Italy) R Vinci	6	6
(Georgia (country)) M Chakhnashvili (Canada) S Fichman	1	1
(France) A Cornet (Ukraine) O Savchuk	7	6
(United States) J Craybas (South Africa) N Grandin	6^{4}	1
(Poland) K Jans (Poland) A Rosolska	1	6	[10]
3	(Russia) E Makarova (Kazakhstan) G Voskoboeva	6	3	[3]
(Spain) L Domínguez Lino (Italy) S Errani	2
WC	(South Africa) K Anderson (Italy) C Dentoni	1	r
(Italy) A Brianti (Italy) ME Camerin	2	3
2	(Spain) N Llagostera Vives (Spain) MJ Martínez Sánchez	6	6

Quarterfinals
(Romania) I-C Begu (Spain) M Marrero	3	2
(Ukraine) M Koryttseva (Belarus) D Kustova	6	6
(Spain) A Parra Santonja (Czech Republic) V Uhlířová	3	1
(Italy) F Pennetta (Italy) R Vinci	6	6
(France) A Cornet (Ukraine) O Savchuk	4	5
(Poland) K Jans (Poland) A Rosolska	6	7
(Spain) L Domínguez Lino (Italy) S Errani	4	6^{5}
2	(Spain) N Llagostera Vives (Spain) MJ Martínez Sánchez	6	7

Semifinals
(Ukraine) M Koryttseva (Belarus) D Kustova	6	6
(Italy) F Pennetta (Italy) R Vinci	3	4
(Poland) K Jans (Poland) A Rosolska	1	2
2	(Spain) N Llagostera Vives (Spain) MJ Martínez Sánchez	6	6

Final
(Ukraine) M Koryttseva (Belarus) D Kustova	1	2
2	(Spain) N Llagostera Vives (Spain) MJ Martínez Sánchez	6	6
