= 2010 Internazionali Femminili di Palermo =

- Date: 12–18 July
- Edition: 23rd
- Category: WTA International
- Draw: 32S / 16D
- Prize money: $220,000
- Surface: Clay
- Location: Palermo, Italy

Champions

Singles
- (Estonia) Kaia Kanepi

Doubles
- (Italy) Alberta Brianti / (Italy) Sara Errani
← 2009 ·	Internazionali Femminili di Palermo	· 2011 →

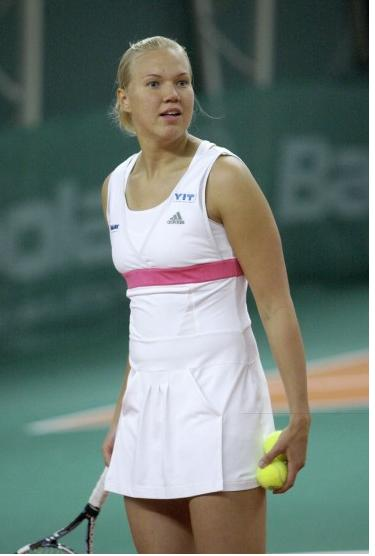
Kaia Kanepi, winner of the singles title

The 2010 Internazionali Femminili di Palermo was a women's tennis tournament played on outdoor clay courts. It was the 23rd edition of the Internazionali Femminili di Palermo, part of the WTA International tournaments of the 2010 WTA Tour. It took place in Palermo, Italy, from 12 July until 18 July 2010. Fifth-seeded Kaia Kanepi won the singles title.

== Finals ==
=== Singles ===
(Estonia) Kaia Kanepi defeated (Italy) Flavia Pennetta, 6–4, 6–3

- It was Kanepi's only singles title of the year and the first of her career.

=== Doubles ===
(Italy) Alberta Brianti / (Italy) Sara Errani defeated (United States) Jill Craybas / (Germany) Julia Görges 6–4, 6–1

== WTA entrants ==
=== Seeds ===
Player	Nationality	Ranking*	Seeding
Flavia Pennetta	Italy	12	1
Aravane Rezaï	France	21	2
Sara Errani	Italy	34	3
Tsvetana Pironkova	Bulgaria	35	4
Kaia Kanepi	Estonia	38	5
Peng Shuai	(China)	44	6
Arantxa Parra Santonja	Spain	52	7
Julia Görges	Germany	74	8

* Seedings are based on the rankings of July 5, 2010.

=== Other entrants ===
The following players received wildcards into the singles main draw

- (Italy) Anna Floris
- (Italy) Romina Oprandi
- (Italy) Flavia Pennetta

The following players received entry from the qualifying draw:

- (Italy) Martina Caregaro
- (Italy) Corinna Dentoni
- (Spain) Nuria Llagostera Vives
- (Croatia) Mirjana Lučić
- (Russia) Anastasia Pivovarova (as a Lucky loser)
