= 2005 Internazionali Femminili di Palermo – Singles =

Singles
- 2005 Internazionali Femminili di Palermo

Final
- Champion: (Spain) Anabel Medina Garrigues
- Runner-up: (Czech Republic) Klára Koukalová
- Score: 6–4, 6–0

Details
- Draw: 32
- Seeds: 8

Events
Singles	Doubles
← 2004 ·	Internazionali Femminili di Palermo	· 2006 →

Anabel Medina Garrigues was the defending champion and successfully defender her title, by defeating Klára Koukalová 6–4, 6–0 in the final.

== Seeds ==
1. (Italy) Silvia Farina Elia (first round, retired)
2. (Italy) Flavia Pennetta (semifinals)
3. (Spain) Anabel Medina Garrigues (champion)
4. (Spain) Nuria Llagostera Vives (second round)
5. (Czech Republic) Klára Koukalová (final)
6. (Poland) Marta Domachowska (second round)
7. (Italy) Roberta Vinci (quarterfinals)
8. (Slovenia) Katarina Srebotnik (first round)

== Draw ==
=== Finals ===
Semifinals
(Bulgaria) Tsvetana Pironkova	4	2
3	(Spain) Anabel Medina Garrigues	6	6
5	(Czech Republic) Klára Koukalová	6	6
2	(Italy) Flavia Pennetta	4	0

Final
3	(Spain) Anabel Medina Garrigues	6	6
5	(Czech Republic) Klára Koukalová	4	0

=== Top half ===
First round
1	(Italy) S Farina Elia	6^{3}	0^{r}
(Bulgaria) T Pironkova	7^{7}	2
(Spain) A Parra Santonja	3	2
(Israel) A Smashnova	6	6
(Tunisia) S Sfar	4	2
WC	(Italy) N Viérin	6	6
(Czech Republic) M Paštiková	3	2
6	(Poland) M Domachowska	6	6
3	(Spain) A Medina Garrigues	6	6
(Czech Republic) D Chládková	3	4
(Spain) C Martínez Granados	6	2	6
(Spain) M Sánchez Lorenzo	2	6	3
(Colombia) C Castaño	6	6
Q	(Italy) R Oprandi	4	4
(Argentina) M Díaz Oliva	6	6
8	(Slovenia) K Srebotnik	3	3

Second round
(Bulgaria) T Pironkova	7^{7}	6
(Israel) A Smashnova	6^{0}	4
WC	(Italy) N Viérin	6	6
6	(Poland) M Domachowska	2	3
3	(Spain) A Medina Garrigues	7	6
(Spain) C Martínez Granados	5	2
(Colombia) C Castaño	1	6^{6}
(Argentina) M Díaz Oliva	6	7^{8}

Quarterfinals
(Bulgaria) T Pironkova	4	7	6
WC	(Italy) N Viérin	6	5	2
3	(Spain) A Medina Garrigues	7	6
(Argentina) M Díaz Oliva	5	1

Semifinals
(Bulgaria) T Pironkova	4	2
3	(Spain) A Medina Garrigues	6	6

=== Bottom half ===
First round
5	(Czech Republic) K Koukalová	6	7^{7}
Q	(Belarus) A Yakimova	2	6^{5}
Q	(Estonia) M Ani	7^{7}	6
Q	(Russia) E Vesnina	6^{5}	3
LL	(Germany) M Müller	3	6	6
(Czech Republic) L Šafářová	6	1	1
(Ukraine) A Bondarenko	2	0
4	(Spain) N Llagostera Vives	6	6
7	(Italy) R Vinci	5	6	6
(Slovakia) M Suchá	7	4	4
(Croatia) J Kostanić	2	6	6
(Spain) L Domnínguez Lino	6	2	2
(Switzerland) E Gagliardi	6	2	6
LL	(Belgium) K Flipkens	2	6	1
(Italy) An Serra Zanetti	2	5
2	(Italy) F Pennetta	6	7

Second round
5	(Czech Republic) K Koukalová	6	1	6
Q	(Estonia) M Ani	2	6	3
LL	(Germany) M Müller	4	6	6
4	(Spain) N Llagostera Vives	6	1	2
7	(Italy) R Vinci	7	6
(Croatia) J Kostanić	5	3
(Switzerland) E Gagliardi	6	3	3
2	(Italy) F Pennetta	1	6	6

Quarterfinals
5	(Czech Republic) K Koukalová	7^{7}	5	6
LL	(Germany) M Müller	6^{3}	7	2
7	(Italy) R Vinci	1	6	6^{3}
2	(Italy) F Pennetta	6	4	7^{7}

Semifinals
5	(Czech Republic) K Koukalová	6	6
2	(Italy) F Pennetta	4	0
