= 2007 Internazionali Femminili di Palermo – Singles =

Singles
- 2007 Internazionali Femminili di Palermo

Final
- Champion: (Hungary) Ágnes Szávay
- Runner-up: (Germany) Martina Müller
- Score: 6–0, 6–1

Details
- Draw: 32
- Seeds: 8

Events
Singles	Doubles
← 2006 ·	Internazionali Femminili di Palermo	· 2008 →

The singles Tournament at the 2007 Internazionali Femminili di Palermo took place between 16 and 22 July on outdoor clay courts in Palermo, Italy. Ágnes Szávay won the title, defeating Martina Müller in the final.

== Seeds ==
1. (Netherlands) Michaëlla Krajicek (first round)
2. (Germany) Martina Müller (final)
3. (Poland) Agnieszka Radwańska (quarterfinals)
4. (France) Émilie Loit (quarterfinals)
5. (Italy) Roberta Vinci (first round)
6. (France) Aravane Rezaï (first round)
7. (Estonia) Kaia Kanepi (first round)
8. (Hungary) Ágnes Szávay (champion)

== Draw ==
=== Key ===
- Q = Qualifier
- WC = Wild card
- LL = Lucky loser
- Alt = Alternate
- SE = Special exempt
- PR = Protected ranking
- ITF = ITF entry
- JE = Junior exempt
- w/o = Walkover
- r = Retired
- d = Defaulted
- SR = Special ranking

=== Finals ===
Semifinals
WC	(Italy) Sara Errani	6^{0}	1
8	(Hungary) Ágnes Szávay	7	6
(Italy) Karin Knapp	4	6	1
2	(Germany) Martina Müller	6	4	6

Finals
8	(Hungary) Ágnes Szávay	6	6
2	(Germany) Martina Müller	0	1

=== Top half ===
First round
1	(Netherlands) M Krajicek	4	2
(Czech Republic) E Birnerová	6	6
(France) V Razzano	2	0
WC	(Italy) S Errani	6	6
(Spain) L Domínguez Lino	6	6
WC	(Italy) A Serra Zanetti	3	3
Q	(Romania) S Cîrstea	6	6
7	(Estonia) K Kanepi	2	4
3	(Poland) A Radwańska	6	6
(Ukraine) M Koryttseva	1	4
Q	(Czech Republic) K Zakopalová	6	6
WC	(Italy) S Disderi	2	3
(Russia) E Bychkova	6	6
LL	(Russia) E Ivanova	3	1
Q	(Romania) R Olaru	2	1
5	(Hungary) A Szávay	6	6

Second round
(Czech Republic) E Birnerová	2	0
WC	(Italy) S Errani	6	6
(Spain) L Domínguez Lino	7	6
Q	(Romania) S Cîrstea	6^{5}	0
3	(Poland) A Radwańska	6	6
Q	(Czech Republic) K Zakopalová	3	4
(Russia) E Bychkova	4	6	2
5	(Hungary) A Szávay	6	4	6

Quarterfinals
WC	(Italy) S Errani	6	6
(Spain) L Domínguez Lino	2	0
3	(Poland) A Radwańska	0	3
8	(Hungary) A Szávay	6	6

Semifinals
WC	(Italy) S Errani	6^{0}	1
8	(Hungary) A Szávay	7	6

=== Bottom half ===
First round
5	(Italy) R Vinci	6	2	3
(Italy) K Knapp	2	6	6
(Bulgaria) T Pironkova	2	3
(Germany) S Klösel	6	6
(Germany) Tatjana Malek	2	5
(Hungary) K Nagy	6	7
LL	(Spain) MJ Martínez Sánchez	4	3
4	(France) E Loit	6	6
6	(France) A Rezaï	3	5
(Italy) F Pennetta	6	7
(Romania) E Gallovits	6	6
(Italy) ME Camerin	0	1
(Denmark) C Wozniacki	3	3
LL	(Spain) C Martínez Granados	6	6
Q	(Slovenia) A Klepač	2	1
2	(Germany) M Müller	6	6

Second round
(Italy) K Knapp	6	7
(Germany) S Klösel	1	6^{2}
(Hungary) K Nagy	1	1
4	(France) E Loit	6	6
(Italy) F Pennetta	6	6
(Romania) E Gallovits	3	1
LL	(Spain) C Martínez Granados	2	1
2	(Germany) M Müller	6	6

Quarterfinals
(Italy) K Knapp	6	7
4	(France) E Loit	3	6^{6}
(Italy) F Pennetta	3	6	4
2	(Germany) M Müller	6	3	6

Semifinals
(Italy) K Knapp	4	6	1
2	(Germany) M Müller	6	4	6
