= 2008 Internazionali Femminili di Palermo – Doubles =

Doubles
- 2008 Internazionali Femminili di Palermo

Final
- Champions: (Italy) Sara Errani (Spain) Nuria Llagostera Vives
- Runners-up: (Russia) Alla Kudryavtseva (Russia) Anastasia Pavlyuchenkova
- Score: 2–6, 7–6^{(7–1)}, 10–4

Details
- Draw: 16
- Seeds: 4

Events
Singles	Doubles
← 2007 ·	Internazionali Femminili di Palermo	· 2009 →

Mariya Koryttseva and Darya Kustova were the defending champions, but Kustova chose not to participate, and only Koryttseva competed that year.
Koryttseva partnered with Galina Voskoboeva, but lost in the semifinals to Sara Errani and Nuria Llagostera Vives

Sara Errani and Nuria Llagostera Vives won in the final 2–6, 7–6^{(7–1)}, 10–4, against Alla Kudryavtseva and Anastasia Pavlyuchenkova.

== Seeds ==
1. (Ukraine) Mariya Koryttseva / (Russia) Galina Voskoboeva (semifinals)
2. (Czech Republic) Renata Voráčová / (Czech Republic) Barbora Záhlavová-Strýcová (semifinals)
3. (Italy) Sara Errani / (Spain) Nuria Llagostera Vives (champions)
4. (Russia) Alla Kudryavtseva / (Russia) Anastasia Pavlyuchenkova (final)

== Draw ==
=== Key ===
- Q = Qualifier
- WC = Wild card
- LL = Lucky loser
- Alt = Alternate
- SE = Special exempt
- PR = Protected ranking
- ITF = ITF entry
- JE = Junior exempt
- w/o = Walkover
- r = Retired
- d = Defaulted
- SR = Special ranking

=== Draw ===
First round
1	(Ukraine) M Koryttseva (Russia) G Voskoboeva	4	6	[10]
(Italy) M Santangelo (Italy) R Vinci	6	4	[7]
(Georgia (country)) M Chakhnashvili (United Kingdom) K O'Brien	1	1
(China) X Han (China) Y Xu	6	6
3	(Italy) S Errani (Spain) N Llagostera Vives	7	3	[13]
(South Africa) K Anderson (Slovakia) J Gajdošová	6^{5}	6	[11]
(France) A Rezaï (Russia) M Shamayko	0	3
(Chinese Taipei) S-w Hsieh (Belgium) Y Wickmayer	6	6
(Italy) A Brianti (Italy) C Dentoni	3	7	[10]
(Spain) L Domínguez Lino (Spain) A Parra Santonja	6	5	[4]
(Ukraine) Y Fedak (Bosnia and Herzegovina) M Jugić-Salkić	4	5
4	(Russia) A Kudryavtseva (Russia) A Pavlyuchenkova	6	7
(Germany) A Kerber (Germany) S Klosel	1	3
WC	(Switzerland) E Gagliardi (Croatia) M Lučić	6	6
(Argentina) J Cravero (Paraguay) R de los Ríos	1	1
2	(Czech Republic) R Voráčová (Czech Republic) B Záhlavová-Strýcová	6	6

Quarterfinals
1	(Ukraine) M Koryttseva (Russia) G Voskoboeva	6	3	[13]
(China) X Han (China) Y Xu	3	6	[11]
3	(Italy) S Errani (Spain) N Llagostera Vives	2	6	[10]
(Chinese Taipei) S-w Hsieh (Belgium) Y Wickmayer	6	2	[8]
(Italy) A Brianti (Italy) C Dentoni	1	4
4	(Russia) A Kudryavtseva (Russia) A Pavlyuchenkova	6	6
WC	(Switzerland) E Gagliardi (Croatia) M Lučić	2	1
2	(Czech Republic) R Voráčová (Czech Republic) B Záhlavová-Strýcová	6	6

Semifinals
1	(Ukraine) M Koryttseva (Russia) G Voskoboeva	4	3
3	(Italy) S Errani (Spain) N Llagostera Vives	6	6
4	(Russia) A Kudryavtseva (Russia) A Pavlyuchenkova	7	6
2	(Czech Republic) R Voráčová (Czech Republic) B Záhlavová-Strýcová	6^{4}	3

Final
3	(Italy) S Errani (Spain) N Llagostera Vives	2	7	[10]
4	(Russia) A Kudryavtseva (Russia) A Pavlyuchenkova	6	6^{1}	[4]
