= 2007 Internazionali Femminili di Palermo – Doubles =

Doubles
- 2007 Internazionali Femminili di Palermo

Final
- Champions: (Ukraine) Mariya Koryttseva (Belarus) Darya Kustova
- Runners-up: (Italy) Alice Canepa (Italy) Karin Knapp
- Score: 6–4, 6–1

Details
- Draw: 16
- Seeds: 4

Events
Singles	Doubles
← 2006 ·	Internazionali Femminili di Palermo	· 2008 →

The women's doubles Tournament at the 2007 Internazionali Femminili di Palermo took place between 16 and 22 July on outdoor clay courts in Palermo, Italy. Mariya Koryttseva and Darya Kustova won the title, defeating Alice Canepa and Karin Knapp in the final.

== Seeds ==
1. (Italy) Maria Elena Camerin / (France) Émilie Loit (first round)
2. (Spain) Lourdes Domínguez Lino / (Italy) Flavia Pennetta (first round)
3. (Czech Republic) Eva Birnerová / (Netherlands) Michaëlla Krajicek (first round)
4. (Poland) Klaudia Jans / (Poland) Alicja Rosolska (semifinals)

== Draw ==
=== Key ===
- Q = Qualifier
- WC = Wild card
- LL = Lucky loser
- Alt = Alternate
- SE = Special exempt
- PR = Protected ranking
- ITF = ITF entry
- JE = Junior exempt
- w/o = Walkover
- r = Retired
- d = Defaulted
- SR = Special ranking

First round
1	(Italy) ME Camerin (France) É Loit	7	2	[6]
WC	(Italy) A Canepa (Italy) K Knapp	6^{9}	6	[10]
(Romania) E Gallovits (Russia) E Ivanova	3	1
(Italy) S Disderi (Uzbekistan) I Tulyaganova	6	6
4	(Poland) K Jans (Poland) A Rosolska	6	6
(Germany) AP Schaefer (Czech Republic) K Zakopalová	2	2
(Germany) M Müller (Poland) A Radwańska	6	6^{3}	[10]
(Russia) E Bychkova (Slovenia) A Klepač	4	7	[7]
(Italy) S Errani (Spain) C Martínez Granados	7	2	[10]
(Spain) M Marrero (Spain) L Pous Tió	5	6	[8]
(Ukraine) M Koryttseva (Belarus) D Kustova	6	7
3	(Czech Republic) E Birnerová (Netherlands) M Krajicek	3	5
(Germany) T Malek (Germany) A Matic	4	7	[15]
(France) S Lefèvre (Romania) Á Szatmári	6	6^{7}	[17]
(Hungary) A Szávay (Denmark) C Wozniacki	6	6
2	(Spain) L Domínguez Lino (Italy) F Pennetta	3	2

Quarterfinals
WC	(Italy) A Canepa (Italy) K Knapp	6	6
(Italy) S Disderi (Uzbekistan) I Tulyaganova	0	1
4	(Poland) K Jans (Poland) A Rosolska	7	2	[10]
(Germany) M Müller (Poland) A Radwańska	6^{3}	6	[4]
(Italy) S Errani (Spain) C Martínez Granados	5	6	[2]
(Ukraine) M Koryttseva (Belarus) D Kustova	7	2	[10]
(France) S Lefèvre (Romania) Á Szatmári	6	0	[10]
(Hungary) A Szávay (Denmark) C Wozniacki	4	6	[7]

Semifinals
WC	(Italy) A Canepa (Italy) K Knapp	6	3	[12]
4	(Poland) K Jans (Poland) A Rosolska	3	6	[10]
(Ukraine) M Koryttseva (Belarus) D Kustova	6^{4}	6	[10]
(France) S Lefèvre (Romania) Á Szatmári	7	2	[6]

Final
WC	(Italy) A Canepa (Italy) K Knapp	4	1
(Ukraine) M Koryttseva (Belarus) D Kustova	6	6
