= 2006 Internazionali Femminili di Palermo – Singles =

Singles
- 2006 Internazionali Femminili di Palermo

Final
- Champion: (Spain) Anabel Medina Garrigues
- Runner-up: (Italy) Tathiana Garbin
- Score: 6–4, 6–4

Details
- Draw: 32 (3WC/4Q/1LL)
- Seeds: 8

Events
Singles	Doubles
← 2005 ·	Internazionali Femminili di Palermo	· 2007 →

Anabel Medina Garrigues was the 2-time defending champion and successfully defended her title, by defeating Tathiana Garbin 6–4, 6–4 in the final.

== Seeds ==
1. (Italy) Flavia Pennetta (first round)
2. (Spain) Anabel Medina Garrigues (champion)
3. (Netherlands) Michaëlla Krajicek (second round)
4. (Czech Republic) Lucie Šafářová (semifinals)
5. (Israel) Anna Smashnova (second round)
6. (Czech Republic) Klára Koukalová (second round)
7. (Czech Republic) Iveta Benešová (second round)
8. (Spain) Lourdes Domínguez Lino (second round)

== Draw ==
=== Key ===
- Q = Qualifier
- WC = Wild card
- LL = Lucky loser
- Alt = Alternate
- SE = Special exempt
- PR = Protected ranking
- ITF = ITF entry
- JE = Junior exempt
- w/o = Walkover
- r = Retired
- d = Defaulted
- SR = Special ranking

=== Finals ===
Semifinals
WC	(Italy) Tathiana Garbin	6	6
(Italy) Roberta Vinci	2	2
4	(Czech Republic) Lucie Šafářová	4	4
2	(Spain) Anabel Medina Garrigues	6	6

Final
WC	(Italy) Tathiana Garbin	4	4
2	(Spain) Anabel Medina Garrigues	6	6

=== Top half ===
First round
1	(Italy) F Pennetta	1	5
(Germany) J Schruff	6	7
(Slovakia) M Suchá	2	7	5
(Italy) R Oprandi	6	5	7
(Italy) A Canepa	2	1
WC	(Italy) T Garbin	6	6
(Ukraine) Y Fedak	3	2
5	(Israel) A Smashnova	6	6
3	(Netherlands) M Krajicek	6	6^{3}	7
WC	(Switzerland) E Gagliardi	1	7^{7}	5
Q	(France) A Rezaï	6	6
(Russia) E Bychkova	4	2
(Estonia) K Kanepi	5	4
(Italy) R Vinci	7	6
(France) S Foretz	4	2
6	(Czech Republic) K Koukalová	6	6

Second round
(Germany) J Schruff	w/o
(Italy) R Oprandi
WC	(Italy) T Garbin	7	6
5	(Israel) A Smashnova	5	3
3	(Netherlands) M Krajicek	4	3
Q	(France) A Rezaï	6	6
(Italy) R Vinci	6	7^{8}
6	(Czech Republic) K Koukalová	2	6^{6}

Quarterfinals
(Germany) J Schruff	1	4
WC	(Italy) T Garbin	6	6
Q	(France) A Rezaï	3	7	1
(Italy) R Vinci	6	5	6

Semifinals
WC	(Italy) T Garbin	6	6
(Italy) R Vinci	2	2

=== Bottom half ===
First round
8	(Spain) L Domínguez Lino	6	1
(Spain) M Sánchez Lorenzo	3	0^{r}
LL	(Spain) MJ Martínez Sánchez	6	6
(Germany) M Müller	4	4
(Greece) E Daniilidou	0	6	6
(Estonia) M Ani	6	4	4
Q	(Croatia) I Abramović	3	0^{r}
4	(Czech Republic) L Šafářová	6	0
7	(Czech Republic) I Benešová	6	7
(Italy) An Serra Zanetti	2	5
Q	(Italy) K Knapp	7^{7}	6^{4}	6
WC	(Italy) N Viérin	6^{2}	7^{7}	1
(Switzerland) T Bacsinszky	1	3
(Belarus) A Yakimova	6	6
Q	(Spain) L Pous Tió	3	1
2	(Spain) A Medina Garrigues	6	6

Second round
8	(Spain) L Domínguez Lino	7^{7}	1	2
LL	(Spain) MJ Martínez Sánchez	6^{0}	6	6
(Greece) E Daniilidou	5	6	5
4	(Czech Republic) L Šafářová	7	4	7
7	(Czech Republic) I Benešová	4	4
Q	(Italy) K Knapp	6	6
(Belarus) A Yakimova	1	6	0
2	(Spain) A Medina Garrigues	6	2	6

Quarterfinals
LL	(Spain) MJ Martínez Sánchez	4	4
4	(Czech Republic) L Šafářová	6	6
Q	(Italy) K Knapp	5	6^{2}
2	(Spain) A Medina Garrigues	7	7^{7}

Semifinals
4	(Czech Republic) L Šafářová	4	4
2	(Spain) A Medina Garrigues	6	6
