= 2008 Internazionali Femminili di Palermo – Singles =

Singles
- 2008 Internazionali Femminili di Palermo

Final
- Champion: (Italy) Sara Errani
- Runner-up: (Ukraine) Mariya Koryttseva
- Score: 6–2, 6–3

Details
- Draw: 32
- Seeds: 8

Events
| Singles | Doubles |
| ← 2007 · | Internazionali Femminili di Palermo | · 2009 → |

Ágnes Szávay was the defending champion, but chose not to participate that year.

Sara Errani won in the final 6–2, 6–3, against Mariya Koryttseva.

== Seeds ==
1. (Italy) Flavia Pennetta (semifinals)
2. (Spain) Anabel Medina Garrigues (semifinals)
3. (France) Aravane Rezaï (first round)
4. (Spain) Carla Suárez Navarro (quarterfinals)
5. (Italy) Sara Errani (champion)
6. (Belgium) Yanina Wickmayer (first round)
7. (Ukraine) Mariya Koryttseva (final)
8. (Italy) Tathiana Garbin (quarterfinals)

== Draw ==
=== Key ===
- Q = Qualifier
- WC = Wild card
- LL = Lucky loser
- Alt = Alternate
- SE = Special exempt
- PR = Protected ranking
- ITF = ITF entry
- JE = Junior exempt
- w/o = Walkover
- r = Retired
- d = Defaulted
- SR = Special ranking

=== Finals ===
Semifinals
1 | (Italy) Flavia Pennetta | 5 | 3
5 | (Italy) Sara Errani | 7 | 6
7 | (Ukraine) Mariya Koryttseva | 6 | 6
2 | (Spain) Anabel Medina Garrigues | 2 | 2

Final
5 | (Italy) Sara Errani | 6 | 6
7 | (Ukraine) Mariya Koryttseva | 2 | 3

=== Top half ===
First round
1 | (Italy) F Pennetta | 6 | 6
(Germany) S Kloesel | 2 | 2
(Spain) L Domínguez Lino | 5 | 6 | 6
(United Kingdom) K O'Brien | 7 | 3 | 0
WC | (Italy) C Dentoni | 4 | 7 | 7
Q | (Italy) A Brianti | 6 | 6^{3} | 5
Q | (Georgia (country)) M Chakhnashvili | 4 | 7 | 6
6 | (Belgium) Y Wickmayer | 6 | 6^{4} | 4
4 | (Spain) C Suárez Navarro | 7 | 7
(Czech Republic) B Záhlavová-Strýcová | 5 | 6^{2}
(France) É Loit | 4 | 6 | 1^{r}
(Russia) G Voskoboeva | 6 | 3 | 0
(Ukraine) J Vakulenko | 6 | 1 | 6
(Italy) M Santangelo | 4 | 6 | 1
(Chinese Taipei) S-w Hsieh | 1 | 0
5 | (Italy) S Errani | 6 | 6

Second round
1 | (Italy) F Pennetta | 6 | 6
(Spain) L Domínguez Lino | 2 | 3
WC | (Italy) C Dentoni | 6 | 1 | 1
Q | (Georgia (country)) M Chakhnashvili | 2 | 6 | 6
4 | (Spain) C Suárez Navarro | 1 | 6 | 6
(Russia) G Voskoboeva | 6 | 3 | 1
(Ukraine) J Vakulenko | 6 | 4 | 1
5 | (Italy) S Errani | 3 | 6 | 6

Quarterfinals
1 | (Italy) F Pennetta | 6 | 6
Q | (Georgia (country)) M Chakhnashvili | 1 | 1
4 | (Spain) C Suárez Navarro | 1 | r
5 | (Italy) S Errani | 4

Semifinals
1 | (Italy) F Pennetta | 5 | 3
5 | (Italy) S Errani | 7 | 6

=== Bottom half ===
First round
7 | (Ukraine) M Koryttseva | 6 | 3 | 6
(Czech Republic) R Voráčová | 4 | 6 | 3
Q | (China) X Han | 6 | 6
(Germany) A Kerber | 4 | 0
LL | (Russia) A Pavlyuchenkova | 7 | 6
WC | (Italy) R Vinci | 5 | 3
(Paraguay) R de los Ríos | 6 | 6
3 | (France) A Rezaï | 4 | 1
8/WC | (Italy) T Garbin | 6 | 7
(Ukraine) Y Fedak | 2 | 5
(France) O Sanchez | 7 | 4
(Russia) E Bychkova | 6^{1} | 0 | r
Q | (Slovakia) J Gajdošová | 0 | 3
(Spain) N Llagostera Vives | 6 | 6
(Russia) A Kudryavtseva | 0 | 4
2 | (Spain) A Medina Garrigues | 6 | 6

Second round
7 | (Ukraine) M Koryttseva | 6 | 3 | 6
Q | (China) X Han | 4 | 6 | 3
LL | (Russia) A Pavlyuchenkova | 6 | 6
(Paraguay) R de los Ríos | 1 | 2
8/WC | (Italy) T Garbin | 7 | 6
(France) O Sanchez | 5 | 4
(Spain) N Llagostera Vives | 0 | 4
2 | (Spain) A Medina Garrigues | 6 | 6

Quarterfinals
7 | (Ukraine) M Koryttseva | 7 | 6
LL | (Russia) A Pavlyuchenkova | 6^{4} | 3
8/WC | (Italy) T Garbin | 0 | 6 | 0
2 | (Spain) A Medina Garrigues | 6 | 3 | 6

Semifinals
7 | (Ukraine) M Koryttseva | 6 | 6
2 | (Spain) A Medina Garrigues | 2 | 2
