= 2010 Internazionali Femminili di Palermo – Singles =

Singles
- 2010 Internazionali Femminili di Palermo

Final
- Champion: (Estonia) Kaia Kanepi
- Runner-up: (Italy) Flavia Pennetta
- Score: 6–4, 6–3

Details
- Draw: 32
- Seeds: 8

Events
| Singles | Doubles |
| ← 2009 · | Internazionali Femminili di Palermo | · 2011 → |

Flavia Pennetta was the defending champion but lost to Kaia Kanepi in the final 6–4, 6–3.

== Seeds ==
1. (Italy) Flavia Pennetta (final)
2. (France) Aravane Rezaï (quarterfinals)
3. (Italy) Sara Errani (quarterfinals)
4. (Bulgaria) Tsvetana Pironkova (second round)
5. (Estonia) Kaia Kanepi (champion)
6. (China) Peng Shuai (withdrew due to left ankle injury)
7. (Spain) Arantxa Parra Santonja (first round)
8. (Germany) Julia Görges (semifinals)
9. (Italy) Alberta Brianti (second round)

== Draw ==
=== Key ===
- Q = Qualifier
- WC = Wild card
- LL = Lucky loser
- Alt = Alternate
- SE = Special exempt
- PR = Protected ranking
- ITF = ITF entry
- JE = Junior exempt
- w/o = Walkover
- r = Retired
- d = Defaulted
- SR = Special ranking

=== Finals ===
Semifinals
1/WC | (Italy) Flavia Pennetta | 6 | 6
8 | (Germany) Julia Görges | 0 | 4
5 | (Estonia) Kaia Kanepi | 6 | 6
WC | (Italy) Romina Oprandi | 3 | 2

Final
1/WC | (Italy) Flavia Pennetta | 4 | 3
5 | (Estonia) Kaia Kanepi | 6 | 6

=== Top half ===
First round
1/WC | (Italy) F Pennetta | 6 | 6
(Germany) K Wörle | 3 | 1
(Croatia) J Kostanić Tošić | 0 | 3
(Czech Republic) R Voráčová | 6 | 6
Q | (Spain) N Llagostera Vives | 6 | 3 | 6
(Germany) A-L Grönefeld | 4 | 6 | 1
(Netherlands) A Rus | 6^{0} | 2
9 | (Italy) A Brianti | 7 | 6
4 | (Bulgaria) T Pironkova | 6 | 7
WC | (Italy) A Floris | 4 | 6^{4}
(United States) J Craybas | 7 | 7
(Uzbekistan) A Amanmuradova | 6^{10} | 5
(Italy) ME Camerin | 2 | 3
Q | (Italy) C Dentoni | 6 | 6
Q | (Italy) M Caregaro | 3 | 2
8 | (Germany) J Görges | 6 | 6

Second round
1/WC | (Italy) F Pennetta | 6 | 6
(Czech Republic) R Voráčová | 0 | 3
Q | (Spain) N Llagostera Vives | 7 | 6
9 | (Italy) A Brianti | 6^{2} | 2
4 | (Bulgaria) T Pironkova | 6 | 2 | 2
(United States) J Craybas | 2 | 6 | 6
Q | (Italy) C Dentoni | 4 | 3
8 | (Germany) J Görges | 6 | 6

Quarterfinals
1/WC | (Italy) F Pennetta | 6 | 6
Q | (Spain) N Llagostera Vives | 4 | 2
(United States) J Craybas | 2 | 4
8 | (Germany) J Görges | 6 | 6

Semifinals
1/WC | (Italy) F Pennetta | 6 | 6
8 | (Germany) J Görges | 0 | 4

=== Bottom half ===
First round
5 | (Estonia) K Kanepi | 7 | 6
(Paraguay) R de los Ríos | 5 | 4
(Romania) IR Olaru | 6 | 6
LL | (Russia) A Pivovarova | 4 | 3
Q | (Croatia) M Lučić | 7 | 0 | 7
(France) P Parmentier | 5 | 6 | 6^{7}
(Ukraine) M Koryttseva | 2 | 3
3 | (Italy) S Errani | 6 | 6
7 | (Spain) A Parra Santonja | 5 | 3
(Slovenia) M Zec Peškirič | 7 | 6
WC | (Italy) R Oprandi | 5
(Croatia) K Šprem | 1 | r
(Slovakia) Z Kučová | 4 | 0
(Colombia) M Duque Mariño | 6 | 6
(Romania) S Halep | 5 | 6 | 2
2 | (France) A Rezaï | 7 | 4 | 6

Second round
5 | (Estonia) K Kanepi | 6 | 6
(Romania) IR Olaru | 1 | 2
Q | (Croatia) M Lučić | 0 | 6^{4}
3 | (Italy) S Errani | 6 | 7
(Slovenia) M Zec Peškirič | 4 | 5
WC | (Italy) R Oprandi | 6 | 7
(Colombia) M Duque Mariño | 6^{3} | 3
2 | (France) A Rezaï | 7 | 6

Quarterfinals
5 | (Estonia) K Kanepi | 6 | 6
3 | (Italy) S Errani | 2 | 2
WC | (Italy) R Oprandi | 7 | 6
2 | (France) A Rezaï | 5 | 0

Semifinals
5 | (Estonia) K Kanepi | 6 | 6
WC | (Italy) R Oprandi | 3 | 2
