= 2005 Internazionali Femminili di Palermo =

- Date: 18–24 July
- Edition: 18th
- Category: Tier IV
- Draw: 32S / 16D
- Prize money: $140,000
- Surface: Clay / outdoor
- Location: Palermo, Italy

Champions

Singles
- (Spain) Anabel Medina Garrigues

Doubles
- (Italy) Giulia Casoni / (Ukraine) Mariya Koryttseva
- Internazionali Femminili di Palermo

The 2005 Internazionali Femminili di Palermo was a professional women's tennis tournament played on outdoor clay courts. It was the 18th edition of the tournament which was part of the WTA Tier IV category of the 2005 WTA Tour. It took place in Palermo, Italy between 18 and 24 July 2005. Third-seeded Anabel Medina Garrigues won her second consecutive singles title at the event, and third in total, and earned $22,000 first-prize money.

== Finals ==
=== Singles ===
- (Spain) Anabel Medina Garrigues defeated (Czech Republic) Klára Koukalová, 6–4, 6–0

It was the 2nd singles title of the year for Medina Garrigues and the 4th title of her career.

=== Doubles ===
- (Italy) Giulia Casoni / (Ukraine) Mariya Koryttseva defeated (Poland) Klaudia Jans / (Poland) Alicja Rosolska, 4–6, 6–3, 7–5

It was the 3rd title for Casoni and the 1st title for Koryttseva in their respective doubles careers.
