= 2005 Internazionali Femminili di Palermo – Doubles =

Doubles
- 2005 Internazionali Femminili di Palermo

Final
- Champions: (Italy) Giulia Casoni (Ukraine) Mariya Koryttseva
- Runners-up: (Poland) Klaudia Jans (Poland) Alicja Rosolska
- Score: 4–6, 6–3, 7–5

Details
- Draw: 16
- Seeds: 4

Events
Singles	Doubles
← 2004 ·	Internazionali Femminili di Palermo	· 2006 →

Anabel Medina Garrigues and Arantxa Sánchez Vicario were the defending champions, but none competed this year.

Giulia Casoni and Mariya Koryttseva won the title by defeating Klaudia Jans and Alicja Rosolska 4–6, 6–3, 7–5 in the final.

== Seeds ==
1. (Czech Republic) Gabriela Navrátilová / (Czech Republic) Michaela Paštiková (first round)
2. (Poland) Marta Domachowska / (Croatia) Jelena Kostanić (semifinals)
3. (Spain) Lourdes Domínguez Lino / (Spain) Nuria Llagostera Vives (first round)
4. (Poland) Klaudia Jans / (Poland) Alicja Rosolska (final)

== Draw ==
=== Key ===
- Q = Qualifier
- WC = Wild card
- LL = Lucky loser
- Alt = Alternate
- SE = Special exempt
- PR = Protected ranking
- ITF = ITF entry
- JE = Junior exempt
- w/o = Walkover
- r = Retired
- d = Defaulted
- SR = Special ranking

=== Draw ===
First round
1	(Czech Republic) G Navrátilová (Czech Republic) M Paštiková	3	5
(Finland) E Laine (Australia) C Watson	6	7
(Germany) M Müller (Czech Republic) V Uhlířová	6	7^{7}
(Austria) D Klemenschits (Austria) S Klemenschits	4	6^{4}
3	(Spain) L Domínguez Lino (Spain) N Llagostera Vives	4	2
(Italy) G Casoni (Ukraine) M Koryttseva	6	6
(Slovakia) K Kachlíková (Slovakia) Ľ Kurhajcová	2	2
(Ukraine) A Bondarenko (Russia) E Vesnina	6	6
(Spain) A Parra Santonja (Romania) A Vanc	7^{7}	6
(Australia) T Musgrave (Germany) J Wöhr	6^{4}	2
Q	(Belarus) T Poutchek (Belarus) A Yakimova	4	1
4	(Poland) K Jans (Poland) A Rosolska	6	6
(Estonia) M Ani (Switzerland) E Gagliardi	6	6
(Spain) RM Andrés Rodríguez (Spain) C Martínez Granados	1	2
WC	(France) S Testud (Italy) R Vinci	1	4
2	(Poland) M Domachowska (Croatia) J Kostanić	6	6

Quarterfinals
(Finland) E Laine (Australia) C Watson	2	1
(Germany) M Müller (Czech Republic) V Uhlířová	6	6
(Italy) G Casoni (Ukraine) M Koryttseva	3	6	6
(Ukraine) A Bondarenko (Russia) E Vesnina	6	4	1
(Spain) A Parra Santonja (Romania) A Vanc	2	2
4	(Poland) K Jans (Poland) A Rosolska	6	6
(Estonia) M Ani (Switzerland) E Gagliardi	3	6^{7}
2	(Poland) M Domachowska (Croatia) J Kostanić	6	7^{9}

Semifinals
(Germany) M Müller (Czech Republic) V Uhlířová	7	2	0
(Italy) G Casoni (Ukraine) M Koryttseva	5	6	6
4	(Poland) K Jans (Poland) A Rosolska	2	7^{7}	6
2	(Poland) M Domachowska (Croatia) J Kostanić	6	6^{4}	2

Final
(Italy) G Casoni (Ukraine) M Koryttseva	4	6	7
4	(Poland) K Jans (Poland) A Rosolska	6	3	5
