= 2006 Internazionali Femminili di Palermo – Doubles =

Doubles
- 2006 Internazionali Femminili di Palermo

Final
- Champions: (Slovakia) Janette Husárová (Netherlands) Michaëlla Krajicek
- Runners-up: (Italy) Alice Canepa (Italy) Giulia Gabba
- Score: 6–0, 6–0

Details
- Draw: 16 (1WC/1Q/1LL)
- Seeds: 4

Events
Singles	Doubles
← 2005 ·	Internazionali Femminili di Palermo	· 2007 →

Giulia Casoni and Mariya Koryttseva were the defending champions, but none competed this year. Casoni retired from professional tennis during this season, after struggling with a knee injury.

Janette Husárová and Michaëlla Krajicek won the title by defeating qualifiers Alice Canepa and Giulia Gabba 6–0, 6–0 in the final.

This tournament saw an unusual event, as all seeded pairs were eliminated in the first round.

== Seeds ==
1. (Greece) Eleni Daniilidou / (Germany) Jasmin Wöhr (first round)
2. (Ukraine) Yuliana Fedak / (Belarus) Anastasiya Yakimova (first round)
3. (Estonia) Maret Ani / (Italy) Roberta Vinci (first round)
4. (Spain) Lourdes Domínguez Lino / (France) Stéphanie Foretz (first round)

== Draw ==
=== Key ===
- Q = Qualifier
- WC = Wild card
- LL = Lucky loser
- Alt = Alternate
- SE = Special exempt
- PR = Protected ranking
- ITF = ITF entry
- JE = Junior exempt
- w/o = Walkover
- r = Retired
- d = Defaulted
- SR = Special ranking

=== Draw ===
First round
1	(Greece) E Daniilidou (Germany) J Wöhr	2	1
LL	(Spain) E Cabeza Candela (Spain) L Pous Tió	6	6
(Hungary) Z Gubacsi (Italy) V Sassi	3	6	0
(Spain) MJ Martínez Sánchez (Spain) A Parra Santonja	6	4	6
3	(Estonia) M Ani (Italy) R Vinci	5	6^{3}
(Slovakia) J Husárová (Netherlands) M Krajicek	7	7^{7}
(Germany) M Müller (Germany) J Schruff	6^{4}	3
(Italy) Ad Serra Zanetti (Italy) An Serra Zanetti	7^{7}	6
(Russia) E Bychkova (Czech Republic) G Navrátilová	7	6
(Italy) S Errani (Italy) K Knapp	5	2
Q	(Italy) A Canepa (Italy) G Gabba	3	6	6
4	(Spain) L Domínguez Lino (France) S Foretz	6	1	1
(Poland) K Jans (Poland) A Rosolska	7	3	6
WC	(Georgia (country)) M Chakhnashvili (Italy) S Disderi	5	6	0
(Italy) T Garbin (Italy) R Oprandi	6	6
2	(Ukraine) Y Fedak (Belarus) A Yakimova	2	4

Quarterfinals
LL	(Spain) E Cabeza Candela (Spain) L Pous Tió	6	3	5
(Spain) MJ Martínez Sánchez (Spain) A Parra Santonja	4	6	7
(Slovakia) J Husárová (Netherlands) M Krajicek	3
(Italy) Ad Serra Zanetti (Italy) An Serra Zanetti	0^{r}
(Russia) E Bychkova (Czech Republic) G Navrátilová	6^{0}	3
Q	(Italy) A Canepa (Italy) G Gabba	7^{7}	6
(Poland) K Jans (Poland) A Rosolska	6	6
(Italy) T Garbin (Italy) R Oprandi	2	0

Semifinals
(Spain) MJ Martínez Sánchez (Spain) A Parra Santonja	3	5
(Slovakia) J Husárová (Netherlands) M Krajicek	6	7
Q	(Italy) A Canepa (Italy) G Gabba	7	2	6
(Poland) K Jans (Poland) A Rosolska	5	6	2

Final
(Slovakia) J Husárová (Netherlands) M Krajicek	6	6
Q	(Italy) A Canepa (Italy) G Gabba	0	0
