= 2009 Internazionali Femminili di Palermo – Singles =

Singles
- 2009 Internazionali Femminili di Palermo

Final
- Champion: (Italy) Flavia Pennetta
- Runner-up: (Italy) Sara Errani
- Score: 6–1, 6–2

Details
- Draw: 32
- Seeds: 8

Events
Singles	Doubles
← 2008 ·	Internazionali Femminili di Palermo	· 2010 →

Sara Errani was the defending champion, but Flavia Pennetta defeated her in the final 6–1, 6–2.

== Seeds ==
1. (Italy) Flavia Pennetta (champion)
2. (Switzerland) Patty Schnyder (quarterfinals)
3. (France) Alizé Cornet (first round)
4. (Russia) Anastasia Pavlyuchenkova (first round)
5. (Italy) Sara Errani (final)
6. (Russia) Ekaterina Makarova (second round)
7. (France) Aravane Rezaï (quarterfinals)
8. (Argentina) Gisela Dulko (first round)

== Draw ==
=== Key ===
- Q = Qualifier
- WC = Wild card
- LL = Lucky loser
- Alt = Alternate
- SE = Special exempt
- PR = Protected ranking
- ITF = ITF entry
- JE = Junior exempt
- w/o = Walkover
- r = Retired
- d = Defaulted
- SR = Special ranking

=== Finals ===
Semifinals
1	(Italy) Flavia Pennetta	6	6
(Italy) Tathiana Garbin	1	1
5	(Italy) Sara Errani	6	4	6
(Germany) Anna-Lena Grönefeld	3	6	1

Final
1	(Italy) Flavia Pennetta	6	6
5	(Italy) Sara Errani	1	2

=== Top half ===
First round
1	(Italy) F Pennetta	6	6
Q	(Spain) A Parra Santonja	2	3
(Italy) R Vinci	4	6	7
(Spain) L Domínguez Lino	6	4	6^{3}
(United States) V Lepchenko	6	6
WC	(Italy) C Dentoni	3	2
(Kazakhstan) G Voskoboeva	2	4
7	(France) A Rezaï	6	6
3	(France) A Cornet	2	2
(Spain) MJ Martínez Sánchez	6	6
(Romania) E Gallovits	4	5
(Italy) T Garbin	6	7
(Belarus) O Govortsova	6	6
(Italy) ME Camerin	3	1
(United States) J Craybas	3	1
6	(Russia) E Makarova	6	6

Second round
1	(Italy) F Pennetta	7	6
(Italy) R Vinci	5	1
(United States) V Lepchenko	7	4	2
7	(France) A Rezaï	6^{2}	6	6
(Spain) MJ Martínez Sánchez	2	3
(Italy) T Garbin	6	6
(Belarus) O Govortsova	6	6
6	(Russia) E Makarova	2	2

Quarterfinals
1	(Italy) F Pennetta	6	6
7	(France) A Rezaï	4	4
(Italy) T Garbin	6	6
(Belarus) O Govortsova	2	1

Semifinals
1	(Italy) F Pennetta	6	6
(Italy) T Garbin	1	1

=== Bottom half ===
First round
5	(Italy) S Errani	6	6
(Ukraine) M Koryttseva	4	4
Q	(Ukraine) O Savchuk	4	4
(Austria) P Mayr	6	6
WC	(Italy) N Vierin	3	2
(Kazakhstan) Y Shvedova	6	6
(Italy) A Brianti	6	4
4	(Russia) A Pavlyuchenkova	3	0	r
8	(Argentina) G Dulko	4	1
(Germany) A-L Grönefeld	6	6
WC	(Italy) A Floris	6^{3}	4
Q	(Netherlands) A Rus	7	6
(Spain) N Llagostera Vives	3	6	6
(Slovenia) M Zec Peškirič	6	4	2
Q	(Russia) A Pivovarova	4	0
2	(Switzerland) P Schnyder	6	6

Second round
5	(Italy) S Errani	7	6
(Austria) P Mayr	6^{6}	1
(Kazakhstan) Y Shvedova	6	6
(Italy) A Brianti	3	2
(Germany) A-L Grönefeld	7	6
Q	(Netherlands) A Rus	6^{5}	3
(Spain) N Llagostera Vives	2	2
2	(Switzerland) P Schnyder	6	6

Quarterfinals
5	(Italy) S Errani	6	7
(Kazakhstan) Y Shvedova	2	5
(Germany) A-L Grönefeld	4
2	(Switzerland) P Schnyder	3	r

Semifinals
5	(Italy) S Errani	6	4	6
(Germany) A-L Grönefeld	3	6	1
