= 2009 Internazionali Femminili di Palermo =

- Date: 13–19 July
- Edition: 22nd
- Category: WTA International
- Surface: Clay / outdoor
- Location: Palermo, Italy

Champions

Singles
- (Italy) Flavia Pennetta

Doubles
- (Spain) Nuria Llagostera Vives / (Spain) María José Martínez Sánchez
- Internazionali Femminili di Palermo

The 2009 Internazionali Femminili di Palermo was a women's tennis tournament played on outdoor clay courts. It is the 22nd edition of the Internazionali Femminili di Palermo, and is part of the WTA International tournaments of the 2009 WTA Tour. It took place in Palermo, Italy, from 13 July until 19 July 2009. First-seeded Flavia Pennetta won the singles title.

== Finals ==
=== Singles ===
(Italy) Flavia Pennetta defeated (Italy) Sara Errani 6–1, 6–2

- It was Pennetta's first singles title of the year and 7th of her career.

=== Doubles ===
(Spain) Nuria Llagostera Vives / (Spain) María José Martínez Sánchez defeated (Ukraine) Mariya Koryttseva / (Belarus) Darya Kustova, 6–1, 6–2

== WTA entrants ==
=== Seeds ===
Player	Nationality	Ranking*	Seeding
Flavia Pennetta	Italy	15	1
Patty Schnyder	Switzerland	21	2
Alizé Cornet	France	23	3
Anastasia Pavlyuchenkova	Russia	33	4
Sara Errani	Italy	38	5
Ekaterina Makarova	Russia	41	6
Aravane Rezaï	France	42	7
Gisela Dulko	Argentina	45	8

- Seedings are based on the rankings of July 6, 2009.

=== Other entrants ===
The following players received wildcards into the singles main draw

- (Italy) Corinna Dentoni
- (Italy) Nathalie Viérin
- (Italy) Anna Floris

The following players received entry from the qualifying draw:

- (Spain) Arantxa Parra Santonja
- (Ukraine) Olga Savchuk
- (Russia) Anastasia Pivovarova
- (Netherlands) Arantxa Rus
