= 2006 Internazionali Femminili di Palermo =

- Date: 17–23 July
- Edition: 19th
- Category: Tier IV
- Draw: 32S / 16D
- Prize money: $145,000
- Surface: Clay / outdoor
- Location: Palermo, Italy

Champions

Singles
- (Spain) Anabel Medina Garrigues

Doubles
- (Slovakia) Janette Husárová (Netherlands) Michaëlla Krajicek
- Internazionali Femminili di Palermo

The 2006 Internazionali Femminili di Palermo was a women's tennis tournament played on outdoor clay courts in Palermo, Italy that was part of the Tier IV category of the 2006 WTA Tour. It was the 19th edition of the Internazionali Femminili di Palermo and took place from 17 July until 23 July 2006. Second-seeded Anabel Medina Garrigues won the singles title, her third consecutive at the event and fourth in total, and earned $22,900 first-prize money.

== Finals ==
=== Singles ===
(Spain) Anabel Medina Garrigues defeated (Italy) Tathiana Garbin, 6–4, 6–4

- It was Medina Garrigues' 2nd singles title of the year and the 6th of her career.

=== Doubles ===
(Slovakia) Janette Husárová / (Netherlands) Michaëlla Krajicek defeated (Italy) Alice Canepa / (Italy) Giulia Gabba, 6–0, 6–0
