= 2010 Internazionali Femminili di Palermo – Doubles =

Doubles
- 2010 Internazionali Femminili di Palermo

Final
- Champions: (Italy) Alberta Brianti (Italy) Sara Errani
- Runners-up: (United States) Jill Craybas (Germany) Julia Görges
- Score: 6–4, 6–1

Details
- Draw: 16
- Seeds: 4

Events
Singles	Doubles
- Internazionali Femminili di Palermo

Nuria Llagostera Vives and María José Martínez Sánchez were the defending champions, but both chose not to participate.

Alberta Brianti and Sara Errani won the final against Jill Craybas and Julia Görges 6–4, 6–1.

== Seeds ==
1. (South Africa) Natalie Grandin / (Czech Republic) Vladimíra Uhlířová (first round)
2. (Uzbekistan) Akgul Amanmuradova / (Romania) Ioana Raluca Olaru (first round)
3. (Spain) Arantxa Parra Santonja / (Czech Republic) Renata Voráčová (quarterfinals)
4. (Ukraine) Mariya Koryttseva / (Belarus) Darya Kustova (quarterfinals)

== Draw ==
Key

- Q = Qualifier
- WC = Wild card
- LL = Lucky loser
- Alt = Alternate
- ITF = ITF entry
- PR = Protected ranking
- SR = Special ranking
- SE = Special exempt
- JE = Junior exempt
- JR = Junior Accelerator Programme entrant
- CO = College Accelerator Programme entrant
- NG = Next Gen Accelerator Program entrant
- w/o = Walkover
- r = Retired
- d = Defaulted

=== Draw ===
First round
1	(South Africa) N Grandin (Czech Republic) V Uhlířová	2	4
(United States) J Craybas (Germany) J Görges	6	6
WC	(Italy) C Dentoni (Italy) A Floris	6	6
(Brazil) M Fernanda Alves (Croatia) J Kostanić Tošić	3	2
3	(Spain) A Parra Santonja (Czech Republic) R Voráčová	6	6
(Ukraine) Y Fedak (Ukraine) A Vasylyeva	3	3
(Argentina) M Irigoyen (Slovenia) M Zec Peškirič	4	4
(Russia) A Pivovarova (Netherlands) A Rus	6	6
(Tunisia) S Sfar (France) A Védy	0	3
(Russia) M Kondratieva (France) S Lefèvre	6	6
(Italy) ME Camerin (Germany) A-L Grönefeld	4	2
4	(Ukraine) M Koryttseva (Belarus) D Kustova	6	6
(Argentina) J Cravero (Germany) K Wörle	1	4
(Italy) A Brianti (Italy) S Errani	6	6
WC	(Italy) C Giovine (Italy) R Oprandi	2	7	[10]
2	(Uzbekistan) A Amanmuradova (Romania) IR Olaru	6	6^{7}	[3]

Quarterfinals
(United States) J Craybas (Germany) J Görges	6	3	[10]
WC	(Italy) C Dentoni (Italy) A Floris	1	6	[3]
3	(Spain) A Parra Santonja (Czech Republic) R Voráčová	4	6	[7]
(Russia) A Pivovarova (Netherlands) A Rus	6	2	[10]
(Russia) M Kondratieva (France) S Lefèvre	2	6	[10]
4	(Ukraine) M Koryttseva (Belarus) D Kustova	6	1	[6]
(Italy) A Brianti (Italy) S Errani	1	7	[10]
WC	(Italy) C Giovine (Italy) R Oprandi	6	5	[8]

Semifinals
(United States) J Craybas (Germany) J Görges	6	6
(Russia) A Pivovarova (Netherlands) A Rus	4	3
(Russia) M Kondratieva (France) S Lefèvre	6^{4}	1
(Italy) A Brianti (Italy) S Errani	7	6

Final
(United States) J Craybas (Germany) J Görges	4	1
(Italy) A Brianti (Italy) S Errani	6	6
