= 2008 Internazionali Femminili di Palermo =

- Date: 7–13 July
- Edition: 21st
- Surface: Clay / outdoor
- Location: Palermo, Italy

Champions

Singles
- (Italy) Sara Errani

Doubles
- (Italy) Sara Errani / (Spain) Nuria Llagostera Vives
- Internazionali Femminili di Palermo

The 2008 Internazionali Femminili di Palermo was a women's tennis tournament played on outdoor clay courts. It was the 21st edition of the Internazionali Femminili di Palermo, and was part of the Tier IV Series of the 2008 WTA Tour. It took place in Palermo, Italy, from 7 July until 13 July 2008.

== Finals ==
=== Singles ===
(Italy) Sara Errani defeated (Ukraine) Mariya Koryttseva, 6–2, 6–3

- It was Sara Errani's 1st career title.

=== Doubles ===
(Italy) Sara Errani / (Spain) Nuria Llagostera Vives defeated (Russia) Alla Kudryavtseva / (Russia) Anastasia Pavlyuchenkova, 2–6, 7–6^{(7–1)}, 10–4
